= Gowran Park Champion Chase =

Steeplechase horse race in Ireland

PWC Champion Chase
2026
Fleur In The Park	Blood Destiny	Emily Love

Previous years
2025
Western Fold	Affordale Fury	Blood Destiny
2024
Visionarian	French Dynamite	Ash Tree Meadow
2023
Easy Game	Gentlemansgame	Envoi Allen
2022
Easy Game	Kemboy	Battleoverdoyen
2021
Royal Rendezvous	Hardline	Abbey Magic

2020-2011
2020
Easy Game	The Storyteller	Paloma Blue
2019
Snow Falcon	Peregrine Run	Us And Them
2018
Woodland Opera	Jury Duty	Peregrine Run
2018
Woodland Opera	Jury Duty	Peregrine Run
2017
A Toi Phil	Balko Des Flos	Ballycasey
2016
Ballycasey	Road To Riches	Devils Bride
2015
Cailin Annamh	Alelchi Inois	Clarcam
2014
Sizing Europe	Road To Riches	Burn And Turn
2013
Sizing Europe	Baily Green	Rubi Light
2012
Sizing Europe	Forpadydeplasterer	I Hear A Symphony
2011
Sizing Europe	Coolcashin	Rubi Light

2010-2001
2010
China Rock	Coolcashin	Oscar Looby
2009
The Fonze	War Of Attrition	Dbest
2008
Knight Legend	Light On The Broom	Davenport Democrat
2007
Justified	One Cool Cookie	Jim
2006
Sir Oj	Light On The Broom	Slim Pickings
2005
Always	Strong Project	Ansar
2004
Kicking King	Rathgar Beau	Strong Run
2003
Go Roger Go	Alcapone	Killultagh Storm
2002
Barrow Drive	Cregg House	Alcapone
2001
Puget Blue	Moscow Express	Micko's Dream

2000-1998
2000
Slaney Native	Ferbet Junior	Promalee
1999
Ferbet Junior	Amberleigh House	His Song
1998
Dorans Pride	Hill Society	Danoli

The Gowran Park Champion Chase is a Grade 2 National Hunt chase in Ireland which is open to horses aged five years or older. It is run at Gowran Park over a distance of about 2 miles and 4 furlongs (4,023 metres), and it is scheduled to take place each year in late September or early October.

The race was first run in 1998.

== Records ==
Most successful horse (4 wins):

- Sizing Europe – 2011, 2012, 2013, 2014

Most successful jockey (4 wins):

- Barry Geraghty – Ferbet Junior (1999), Barrow Drive (2002), Kicking King (2004), Cailin Annamh (2015)

Most successful trainer (5 wins):

- Jessica Harrington – Ferbet Junior (1999), Slaney Native (2000), Knight Legend (2008), Cailin Annamh (2015), Woodland Opera (2018)
- Willie Mullins - Ballycasey (2016), Easy Game (2020,2022,2023), Royal Rendezvous (2021)

== Winners ==
Year	Winner	Age	Jockey	Trainer
1998	Dorans Pride	9	Richard Dunwoody	Michael Hourigan
1999	Ferbet Junior	6	Barry Geraghty	Jessica Harrington
2000	Slaney Native	7	Paul Moloney	Jessica Harrington
2001	Puget Blue	8	David Casey	Mouse Morris
2002	Barrow Drive	6	Barry Geraghty	Tony Mullins
2003	Go Roger Go	11	Conor O'Dwyer	Edward O'Grady
2004	Kicking King	6	Barry Geraghty	Tom Taaffe
2005	Always	6	Paul Carberry	Noel Meade
2006	Sir Oj	9	Paul Carberry	Noel Meade
2007	Justified	8	Ruby Walsh	Dusty Sheehy
2008	Knight Legend	9	Andrew Leigh	Jessica Harrington
2009	The Fonze	8	Shay Barry	Eoin Doyle
2010	China Rock	7	Ruby Walsh	Mouse Morris
2011	Sizing Europe	9	Andrew Lynch	Henry de Bromhead
2012	Sizing Europe	10	Andrew Lynch	Henry de Bromhead
2013	Sizing Europe	11	Andrew Lynch	Henry de Bromhead
2014	Sizing Europe	12	Johnny Burke	Henry de Bromhead
2015	Cailin Annamh	7	Barry Geraghty	Jessica Harrington
2016	Ballycasey	9	Ruby Walsh	Willie Mullins
2017	A Toi Phil	7	Jack Kennedy	Gordon Elliott
2018	Woodland Opera	8	Robbie Power	Jessica Harrington
2019	Snow Falcon	9	Sean Flanagan	Noel Meade
2020	Easy Game	6	Paul Townend	Willie Mullins
2021	Royal Rendezvous	9	Danny Mullins	Willie Mullins
2022	Easy Game	8	Brian Hayes	Willie Mullins
2023	Easy Game	9	Paul Townend	Willie Mullins
2024	Visionarian	9	Sean Flanagan	Gavin Cromwell
2025	Western Fold	6	Danny Gilligan	Gordon Elliott
2026	Fleur In The Park	7	Cian Quirke	Andrew Slattery

== See also ==
- Horse racing in Ireland
- List of Irish National Hunt races
