= Fortria Chase =

Steeplechase horse race in Ireland

Fortria Chase
2026
Found A Fifty	Touch Me Not	Only By Night

Previous years
2025
Found A Fifty	Dinoblue	Hercule Du Seuil
2024
Found A Fifty	Solness	Senecia
2023
Captain Guinness	Riviere D'etel	Dysart Dynamo
2022
Captain Guinness	Riviere D'etel	Andy Dufresne
2021
Notebook	Samcro	Bridge Native

2020-2011
2020
Castlegrace Paddy	A Plus Tard	Kildorrery
2019
Ballyoisin	A Plus Tard	Hardline
2018
Ballyoisin	Ordinary World	Listen Dear
2017
Clarcam	Alisier D'irlande	Fine Rightly
2016
Arctic Skipper	Gilgamboa	Ballycasey
2015
Hidden Cyclone	Days Hotel	Flemenstar
2014
Twinlight	Days Hotel	Irish Thistle
2013
Flemenstar	Days Hotel	Realt Mor
2012
Flemenstar	Big Zeb	Foildubh
2011
Big Zeb	Noble Prince	Forpadydeplasterer

2010-2001
2010
Big Zeb	Golden Silver	Carthalawn
2009
Big Zeb	Made In Taipan	Watson Lake
2008
Watson Lake	Slim Pickings	Mansony
2007
French Accordion	Kahuna	Central House
2006
Nickname	Central House	Watson Lake
2005
Central House	Moscow Flyer	Hi Cloy
2004
Moscow Flyer	Arctic Copper	Fiery Ring
2003
Moscow Flyer	Glenelly Gale	Rathgar Beau
2002
Alcapone	Arctic Copper	Fadoudal Du Cochet
2001
Micko's Dream	Native Upmanship	Zayta

2000-1991
2000
Native Upmanship	Frozen Groom	Delphi Lodge
1999
Private Peace	Linden's Lotto	Merry Gale
1998
Delphi Lodge	Papillon	Merry Gale
1997
Arctic Weather	Manhattan Castle	Beakstown
1996
Anabatic	Sound Man	Corston Dancer
1995
Sound Man	Brockley Court	Bavard Dieu
1994
Annfield Lady	Brockley Court	Eyelid
1993
Magic Million	Gale Again	Random Prince
1991
El-Sid Senor	Good For A Laugh	Redundant Pal

1990-1988
1990
Blitzkreig	Astral River	Ebony Star
1989
Have A Barney	Wolf Of Badenoch	Rust Never Sleeps
1988
Wolf Of Badenoch	Weather The Storm	Excursion

The Fortria Chase is a Grade 2 National Hunt steeplechase in Ireland which is open to horses aged five years or older. It is run at Navan over a distance of about 2 miles (3,219 metres), and it is scheduled to take place each year in November.

The event is named after Fortria, a successful Irish-trained chaser in the late 1950s and early 1960s. It was formerly a handicap race, and it used to be open to horses aged four or older. It was given Grade 3 status in 1993, and its distance was extended by a furlong in 1996. It returned to its previous length in 2000, and at the same time it became a conditions race for five-year-olds and up. It was promoted to Grade 2 level in 2003.

== Records ==
Most successful horse (3 wins):

- Big Zeb – 2009, 2010, 2011
- Found A Fifty - 2024, 2025, 2026

Leading jockey (7 wins):

- Barry Geraghty – Private Peace (1999), Alcapone (2002), Moscow Flyer (2003, 2004), Big Zeb (2009, 2010), Ballyoisin (2018)

Leading trainer (4 wins):

- Gordon Elliott - Clarcam (2017), Found A Fifty (2024, 2025, 2026)

== Winners since 1988 ==
Year	Winner	Age	Jockey	Trainer
1988	Wolf of Badenoch	7	Tommy Carmody	John Mulhern
1989	Have a Barney	8	Tom Taaffe	Arthur Moore
1990	Blitzkreig	7	Tommy Carmody	Edward O'Grady
1991	El-Sid Senor (Note: The 1991 running took place at Fairyhouse)	8	Liam Cusack	Francis Flood
	no race 1992
1993	Magic Million	7	Pat McWilliams	Mick O'Toole
1994	Annfield Lady	6	Trevor Horgan	Willie Mullins
1995	Sound Man	7	Richard Dunwoody	Edward O'Grady
1996	Anabatic	8	Tom Rudd	Michael O'Brien
1997	Arctic Weather	8	Tom Rudd	Michael O'Brien
1998	Delphi Lodge	8	Tommy Treacy	Tom Taaffe
1999	Private Peace	9	Barry Geraghty	Frances Crowley
2000	Native Upmanship	7	Conor O'Dwyer	Arthur Moore
2001	Micko's Dream	9	Paul Carberry	Willie Mullins
2002	Alcapone	8	Barry Geraghty	Mouse Morris
2003	Moscow Flyer	9	Barry Geraghty	Jessica Harrington
2004	Moscow Flyer	10	Barry Geraghty	Jessica Harrington
2005	Central House	8	Roger Loughran (Note: amateur rider)	Dessie Hughes
2006	Nickname	7	Niall Madden	Martin Brassil
2007	French Accordion	7	John Cullen	Paul Nolan
2008	Watson Lake	10	Paul Carberry	Noel Meade
2009	Big Zeb	8	Barry Geraghty	Colm Murphy
2010	Big Zeb	9	Barry Geraghty	Colm Murphy
2011	Big Zeb	10	Robbie Power	Colm Murphy
2012	Flemenstar	7	Andrew Lynch	Peter Casey
2013	Flemenstar	8	Andrew Lynch	Tony Martin
2014	Twinlight	7	Ruby Walsh	Willie Mullins
2015	Hidden Cyclone	10	Brian Hayes	John Joseph Hanlon
2016	Arctic Skipper	7	Sean Flanagan	Vincent Laurence Halley
2017	Clarcam	7	Jack Kennedy	Gordon Elliott
2018	Ballyoisin	7	Barry Geraghty	Enda Bolger
2019	Ballyoisin	8	Mark Walsh	Enda Bolger
2020	Castlegrace Paddy	9	Paul Townend	Pat Fahy
2021	Notebook	8	Rachael Blackmore	Henry de Bromhead
2022	Captain Guinness	7	Rachael Blackmore	Henry de Bromhead
2023	Captain Guinness	8	Rachael Blackmore	Henry de Bromhead
2024	Found A Fifty	7	Jack Kennedy	Gordon Elliott
2025	Found A Fifty	8	Jack Kennedy	Gordon Elliott
2026	Found A Fifty	9	Jack Kennedy	Gordon Elliott

== See also ==
- Horse racing in Ireland
- List of Irish National Hunt races
