= Irish Daily Star Chase =

Steeplechase horse race in Ireland

Daily Star Chase
2026
Gorgeous Tom	Croke Park	Apple's Of Bresil

Previous years
2025
Heart Wood	Monbeg Park	Croke Park
2024
French Dynamite	Minella Indo	Hewick
2023
Minella Indo	Hurricane Georgie	Delta Work
2022
Galvin	Run Wild Fred	Politesse
2021
Galvin	Annamix	Brahma Bull

2020-2011
2020
The Storyteller	Tout Est Permis	Shattered Love
2019
Jett	Alpha Des Obeaux	Tout Est Permis
2018
Sub Lieutenant	Outlander	Sandymount Duke
2017
Road To Respect	Kilcarry Bridge	Sub Lieutenant
2016
Sadler's Risk	Lord Scoundrel	Federici
2015
Don Cossack	Roi Du Mee	Cailin Annamh
2014
Don Cossack	Loosen My Load	Alderwood
2013
Toner D'Oudairies	Roi Du Mee	First Lieutenant
2012
Roi Du Mee	Magnanimity	Joncol
2011
Roi Du Mee	Forpadydeplasterer	Jadanli

2010-2005
2010
China Rock	Sizing Europe	Siegemaster
2009
Casey Jones	Kilcrea Castle	Ponmeoath
2008
War Of Attrition	Kicking King	Watson Lake
2007
Knight Legend	Central House	Steel Band
2006
War Of Attrition	Watson Lake	Barrow Drive
2005
War Of Attrition	Kicking King	Pizarro

The Irish Daily Star Chase is a Grade 3 National Hunt steeplechase in Ireland which is open to horses aged five years or older. It is run at Punchestown over a distance of about 3 miles and 1 furlongs (5,029 metres), and it is scheduled to take place each year in October.

The race was first run in 2005 and was awarded Grade 3 status in 2007. Prior to 2016 it was run over 2 miles and 7 furlongs.

== Records ==
Most successful horse (3 wins):

- War Of Attrition – 2005, 2006, 2008

Leading jockey (4 wins):

- Davy Russell - War Of Attrition (2008), Roi Du Mee (2011), Galvin (2021, 2022)

Leading trainer (8 wins):

- Gordon Elliott - Roi Du Mee (2011, 2012), Toner D'Oudairies (2013), Don Cossack (2014, 2015), The Storyteller (2020), Galvin (2021, 2022)

== Winners ==
Year	Winner	Age	Jockey	Trainer
2005	War Of Attrition	6	Conor O'Dwyer	Mouse Morris
2006	War Of Attrition	7	Conor O'Dwyer	Mouse Morris
2007	Knight Legend	8	Barry Geraghty	Jessica Harrington
2008	War Of Attrition	9	Davy Russell	Mouse Morris
2009	Casey Jones	8	Paul Carberry	Noel Meade
2010	China Rock	7	Ruby Walsh	Mouse Morris
2011	Roi Du Mee	6	Davy Russell	Gordon Elliott
2012	Roi Du Mee	7	Paul Carberry	Gordon Elliott
2013	Toner D'Oudairies	6	Bryan Cooper	Gordon Elliott
2014	Don Cossack	7	Bryan Cooper	Gordon Elliott
2015	Don Cossack	8	Bryan Cooper	Gordon Elliott
2016	Sadler's Risk	8	David Mullins	Henry de Bromhead
2017	Road To Respect	6	Sean Flanagan	Noel Meade
2018	Sub Lieutenant	9	Rachael Blackmore	Henry de Bromhead
2019	Jett	8	Robbie Power	Jessica Harrington
2020	The Storyteller	9	Keith Donoghue	Gordon Elliott
2021	Galvin	7	Davy Russell	Gordon Elliott
2022	Galvin	8	Davy Russell	Gordon Elliott
2023	Minella Indo	10	Rachael Blackmore	Henry de Bromhead
2024	French Dynamite	9	Mark Walsh	Mouse Morris
2025	Heart Wood	7	Darragh O'Keeffe	Henry de Bromhead
2026	Gorgeous Tom	8	Darragh O'Keeffe	Henry de Bromhead

== See also ==
- Horse racing in Ireland
- List of Irish National Hunt races
