= Tied Cottage Chase =

Irish steeplechase

Tied Cottage Chase
2017
Douvan	Realt Mor	Draycott Place

Previous years
2016
Felix Yonger	Flemenstar	Mozoltov
2015
Hidden Cyclone	Bright New Dawn	Twinlight
2014
Arvika Ligeonniere	Toner D'Oudairies	Rathlin
2013
Sizing Europe	Foildubh	Blazing Tempo
2012
Sizing Europe	Big Zeb	Imperial Shabra
2011
Golden Silver	Big Zeb	Sizing Europe
2010
Big Zeb	Golden Silver	Mansony
2009
Mansony	Watson Lake	Scotsirish
2008
Don't Be Bitin	Tumbling Dice	Albanov
2007
Nickname	Central House	Steel Band
2006
Central House	Jim	Accordion Etoile
2005
Moscow Flyer	Steel Band	Hi Cloy
2004
Native Scout	Rathgar Beau	Fadoudal Du Cochet
2003
Moscow Flyer	Copernicus	Commanche Court

The Tied Cottage Chase was a Grade 2 National Hunt steeplechase that takes place in Ireland. It was run at Punchestown Racecourse in late January or early February each year, over a distance of 2 miles with 11 fences. The race was named after Tied Cottage, a National Hunt horse who won the event in 1980. The race was founded in 1999 and was recently sponsored by Boylesports.

The race was last run in February 2017, as it was replaced by the Dublin Chase at the new Leopardstown Dublin Festival in 2018.

== Records ==
Most successful horse (2 wins):

- Moscow Flyer – 2003, 2005
- Sizing Europe - 2012, 2013

Leading jockey (4 wins):

- Barry Geraghty – Moscow Flyer (2003, 2005), Native Scout (2004), Big Zeb (2010)
- Ruby Walsh - Nickname (2007), Arvika Ligeonniere (2014), Felix Yonger (2016), Douvan (2017)

Leading trainer (4 wins):

- Willie Mullins - Golden Silver (2011), Arvika Ligeonniere (2014), Felix Yonger (2016), Douvan (2017)

== Winners ==
Year	Winner	Age	Jockey	Trainer
1999	Cockney Lad		Paul Carberry	Noel Meade
2000	Fadoudal du Cochet		Conor O'Dwyer	Arthur Moore
	no race 2001–02
2003	Moscow Flyer	9	Barry Geraghty	Jessica Harrington
2004	Native Scout		Barry Geraghty	Donal Hassett
2005	Moscow Flyer	11	Barry Geraghty	Jessica Harrington
2006	Central House		Roger Loughran	Dessie Hughes
2007	Nickname		Ruby Walsh	Martin Brassil
2008	Don't Be Bitin		Paul Carberry	Eoin Griffin
2009	Mansony		Davy Russell	Arthur Moore
2010	Big Zeb		Barry Geraghty	Colm Murphy
2011	Golden Silver		Paul Townend	Willie Mullins
2012	Sizing Europe	10	Andrew Lynch	Henry de Bromhead
2013	Sizing Europe	11	Andrew Lynch	Henry de Bromhead
2014	Arvika Ligeonniere	9	Ruby Walsh	Willie Mullins
2015	Hidden Cyclone	10	Andrew McNamara	John Joseph Hanlon
2016	Felix Yonger	10	Ruby Walsh	Willie Mullins
2017	Douvan	7	Ruby Walsh	Willie Mullins

== See also ==
- List of Irish National Hunt races
