= 2005 Cheltenham Gold Cup =

The 2005 Cheltenham Gold Cup was a horse race which took place at Cheltenham on Friday 18 March 2005. It was the 77th running of the Cheltenham Gold Cup, and it was won by the pre-race favourite Kicking King. The winner was ridden by Barry Geraghty and trained by Tom Taaffe.

Kicking King was the first winner of the Gold Cup to be trained in Ireland since Imperial Call in 1996. The three-time winner Best Mate was withdrawn from the race a week earlier after bursting a blood vessel. A fourth day was added to the Cheltenham Festival this year, and the Gold Cup was switched to a new day, Friday.

== Race details ==
- Sponsor: Totesport
- Winner's prize money: £212,268.40
- Going: Good
- Number of runners: 15
- Winner's time: 6m 42.9s

== Full result ==
	*	Horse	Age	Jockey	Trainer ^{†}	SP
1		Kicking King	7	Barry Geraghty	Tom Taaffe (IRE)	4/1 fav
2	5	Take the Stand	9	Tony Dobbin	Peter Bowen	25/1
3	8	Sir Rembrandt	9	Andrew Thornton	Robert Alner	12/1
4	nk	Royal Auclair	8	Christian Williams	Paul Nicholls	40/1
5	9	Grey Abbey	11	Graham Lee	Howard Johnson	15/2
6	1¼	Strong Flow	8	Ruby Walsh	Paul Nicholls	5/1
7	½	Celestial Gold	7	Timmy Murphy	Martin Pipe	9/2
8	14	Ballycassidy	9	Seamus Durack	Peter Bowen	80/1
9	11	Therealbandit	8	Tony McCoy	Martin Pipe	16/1
10	dist	Astonville	11	Tom Scudamore	Michael Scudamore	500/1
PU	Fence 21	Beef Or Salmon	9	Paul Carberry	Michael Hourigan (IRE)	5/1
PU	Fence 21	Venn Ottery	10	Jamie Moore	Martin Pipe	200/1
PU	Fence 20	Tiutchev	12	Robert Thornton	Martin Pipe	50/1
PU	Fence 19	Truckers Tavern	10	Brian Harding	Ferdy Murphy	100/1
Fell	Fence 17	Pizarro	8	Davy Russell	Edward O'Grady (IRE)	14/1

* The distances between the horses are shown in lengths or shorter. nk = neck; PU = pulled-up.
† Trainers are based in Great Britain unless indicated.

== Winner's details ==
Further details of the winner, Kicking King:

- Foaled: 10 April 1998, in Ireland
- Sire: Old Vic; Dam: Fairy Blaze (Good Thyne)
- Owner: Conor Clarkson
- Breeder: Sunnyhill Stud
