= Buck House Novice Chase =

Steeplechase horse race in Ireland

Buck House Novice Chase
2026
Chanceawetmorning	Sir Allen	Vitorio Piel

Previous years
2025
King Of Kingsfield	Birdie Or Bust	War Correspondent
2024
Jordans	Monbeg Park	Broomfield Bijou
2023
Hercule Du Seuil	Senecia	Lucid Dreams
2022
Adamantly Chosen	Visionarian	Midnight Run
2021
Embittered	Hurricane Georgie	Exit Poll

2020-2011
2020
Zarkareva	Polished Steel	A Wave Of The Sea
2019
Jan Maat	Cool Colonnade	Only two finished
2018
Cadmium	Ornua	Cubomania
2017
Death Duty	Tout Est Permis	Woodland Opera
2016
Three Stars	Ball D'arc	Colla Pier
2015
The Game Changer	Sizing Platinum	Miss Dinamic
2014
Alelchi Inois	August Hill	Arzembouy Premier
2013
Art Of Logistics	Six Stone Ned	Darwins Fox
2012
Baily Green	Special Tiara	Sean Airgead
2011
Lucky William	Whodoyouthink	De Valira

2010-2005
2010
Loosen My Load	Darceys Dancer	Norther Bay
2009
Sizing Europe	Harchibald	Tipolino
2008
Trafford Lad	Rare Bob	Fantoche
2007
Coolgreaney	Medicinal	Emotional Article
2006
Gemini Lucy	Mounthenry	Sabina Park
2005
Justified	Doctor Linton	Django

The Buck House Novice Chase is a Grade 3 National Hunt novice chase in Ireland which is open to horses aged four years or older. It is run at Punchestown over a distance of about 2 miles and 2 furlongs (3,621 metres), and it is scheduled to take place each year in October.

The race was first run in 2005 and was awarded Grade 3 status in 2007.

== Records ==
Leading jockey (5 wins):

- Ruby Walsh – Coolgreaney (2007), Trafford Lad (2008), Alelchi Inois (2014), Three Stars (2016), Cadmium (2018)

Leading trainer (5 wins):

- Henry de Bromhead – Sizing Europe (2009), Loosen My Load (2010), Three Stars (2016), Jan Maat (2019), Zarkareva(2019)

== Winners ==
Year	Winner	Age	Jockey	Trainer
2005	Justified	6	Shay Barry	Dusty Sheehy
2006	Gemini Lucy	6	Andrew Leigh	Jessica Harrington
2007	Coolgreaney	6	Ruby Walsh	Sean Treacy
2008	Trafford Lad	6	Ruby Walsh	Dusty Sheehy
2009	Sizing Europe	7	Andrew Lynch	Henry de Bromhead
2010	Loosen My Load	6	Andrew Lynch	Henry de Bromhead
2011	Lucky William	7	Bryan Cooper	Thomas Cooper
2012	Baily Green	6	David Casey	Mouse Morris
2013	Art Of Logistics	5	Bryan Cooper	Dessie Hughes
2014	Alelchi Inois	6	Ruby Walsh	Willie Mullins
2015	The Game Changer	6	Bryan Cooper	Gordon Elliott
2016	Three Stars	6	Ruby Walsh	Henry de Bromhead
2017	Death Duty	6	Davy Russell	Gordon Elliott
2018	Cadmium	6	Ruby Walsh	Willie Mullins
2019	Jan Maat	6	Rachael Blackmore	Henry de Bromhead
2020	Zarkareva	4	Dylan Robinson	Henry de Bromhead
2021	Embittered	7	Bryan Cooper	Joseph O'Brien
2022	Adamantly Chosen	5	Danny Mullins	Willie Mullins
2023	Hercule Du Seuil	6	Mark Walsh	Willie Mullins
2024	Jordans	5	Richard Deegan	Joseph O'Brien
2025	King Of Kingsfield	7	Jack Kennedy	Gordon Elliott
2026	Chanceawetmorning	6	Jack Kennedy	Gordon Elliott

== See also ==
- Horse racing in Ireland
- List of Irish National Hunt races
