= Craddockstown Novice Chase =

Steeplechase horse race in Ireland

- Class: Grade 2
- Location: Punchestown; County Kildare, Ireland
- Race type: steeplechase
- Sponsor: Mongey Communications
- Website: Punchestown

Race information
- Distance: 2m 40y (3,219 metres)
- Surface: Turf
- Track: Right-handed
- Qualification: Four-years-old and up
- Weight: 10 st 10 lb (4yo); 11 st 4 lb (5yo+); Allowances; 7 lb for mares
- Purse: €35,000 (2020); 1st: €20,650

Craddockstown Novice Chase
2025
| Westport Cove | Fleur In The Park | Qualimita |

Previous years
2024
Touch Me Not | Farren Glory | Nurburgring
2023
Imagine | Lucid Dreams | Uncle Phil
2022
Midnight Run | Mars Harper | Barnacullia
2021
Riviere D'etel | Cape Gentleman | Embittered

2020-2011
2020
Felix Desjy | Sizing Pottsie | Darver Star
2019
Notebook | Moon Over Germany | Mount Pelier
2018
Voix Du Reve | Hardline | Cadmium
2017
Woodland Opera | Tombstone | Calino D'airy
2016
Identity Thief | Ordinary World | Attribution
2015
Sizing John | Lord Scoundrel | My Hometown
2014
Chancol | Un Beau Roman | Enjoy Responsibly
2013
Felix Yonger | Defy Logic | Passage Vendome
2012
Twinlight | Baily Green | Jenari
2011
Days Hotel | Lucky William | Foildubh

2010-2001
2010
Realt Dubh | Gates Of Rome | Jigalo
2009
Sizing Europe | Major Finnegan | Beau Michael
2008
Northern Alliance | Sizing Africa | Coolpotts
2007
Escrea | For A Song | Savitha
2006
Blueberry Boy | Gemini Lucy | Sky's The Limit
2005
Justified | Wild Passion | Top Strategy
2004
Sir Oj | Mariah Rollins | Kickham
2003
Anxious Moments | Caishill | Golden Row
2001
Moscow Flyer | Masalarian | Grimes

2000-1995
2000
Limestone Lad | Generosa | Hat Or Halo
1999
Go Roger Go | Snow Dragon | Commanche Court
1998
Ollimar | Total Success | Your Sorry Now
1997
Bavard Jet | Magical Approach | Finnegan's Hollow
1996
Jeffell | Bobbyjo | The Outback Way
1995
Arctic Weather | Double Symphony | Lord Singapore

The Craddockstown Novice Chase is a Grade 2 National Hunt novice steeplechase in Ireland which is open to horses aged four years or older. It is run at Punchestown over a distance of about 2 miles (2 miles and 40 yards, or 3,255 metres), and it is scheduled to take place each year in November.

The race was first run in 1995. For a period the event was classed at Grade 3 level. It was promoted to Grade 2 status in 2003.

== Records ==
Leading jockey since 1995 (3 wins):

- Paul Carberry - Sir Oj (2004), Northern Alliance (2008), Chancol (2014)
- Andrew Lynch – Blueberry Boy (2006), Sizing Europe (2009), Days Hotel (2011)
- Paul Townend - Voix Du Reve (2018), Wesport Cove (2025), Ocastle Des Mottes (2026)

Leading trainer since 1995 (5 wins):

- Henry de Bromhead – Sizing Europe (2009), Days Hotel (2011), Sizing John (2015), Identity Thief (2016), Notebook (2019)
- Willie Mullins - Twinlight (2012), Felix Yonger (2013), Voix Du Reve (2018), Wesport Cove (2025), Ocastle Des Mottes (2026)

== Winners ==
| Year | Winner | Age | Jockey | Trainer |
|---|---|---|---|---|
| 1995 | Arctic Weather | 6 | Tom Rudd | Michael O'Brien |
| 1996 | Jeffell | 6 | Francis Woods | Arthur Moore |
| 1997 | Bavard Jet (Note: The 1997 running took place at Cork) | 5 | Ken Whelan | Enda Bolger |
| 1998 | Ollimar | 6 | Tommy Treacy | Jim Dreaper |
| 1999 | Go Roger Go | 7 | Barry Geraghty | Edward O'Grady |
| 2000 | Limestone Lad | 8 | Barry Cash | James Bowe |
| 2001 | Moscow Flyer | 7 | Barry Geraghty | Jessica Harrington |
| 2002 | Petersham (Note: The 2002 edition was held at Wexford) | 5 | Danny Howard | Michael O'Brien |
| 2003 | Anxious Moments | 8 | David Casey | Charlie Swan |
| 2004 | Sir Oj | 7 | Paul Carberry | Noel Meade |
| 2005 | Justified | 6 | Shay Barry | Dusty Sheehy |
| 2006 | Blueberry Boy | 7 | Andrew Lynch | Paul Stafford |
| 2007 | Escrea | 8 | John Cullen | Paul Nolan |
| 2008 | Northern Alliance | 7 | Paul Carberry | Tony Martin |
| 2009 | Sizing Europe | 7 | Andrew Lynch | Henry de Bromhead |
| 2010 | Realt Dubh | 6 | Davy Condon | Noel Meade |
| 2011 | Days Hotel | 6 | Andrew Lynch | Henry de Bromhead |
| 2012 | Twinlight | 5 | Ruby Walsh | Willie Mullins |
| 2013 | Felix Yonger | 7 | Ruby Walsh | Willie Mullins |
| 2014 | Chancol | 5 | Paul Carberry | Noel Meade |
| 2015 | Sizing John | 5 | Johnny Burke | Henry de Bromhead |
| 2016 | Identity Thief | 6 | Bryan Cooper | Henry de Bromhead |
| 2017 | Woodland Opera | 7 | Robbie Power | Jessica Harrington |
| 2018 | Voix du Reve | 6 | Paul Townend | Willie Mullins |
| 2019 | Notebook | 6 | Rachael Blackmore | Henry de Bromhead |
| 2020 | Felix Desjy | 7 | Jack Kennedy | Gordon Elliott |
| 2021 | Riviere D'etel | 4 | Denis O'Regan | Gordon Elliott |
| 2022 | Midnight Run | 8 | Bryan Cooper | Joseph O'Brien |
| 2023 | Imagine | 5 | Jack Kennedy | Gordon Elliott |
| 2024 | Touch Me Not | 5 | Sam Ewing | Gordon Elliott |
| 2025 | Westport Cove | 7 | Paul Townend | Willie Mullins |
| 2026 | Ocastle Des Mottes | 7 | Paul Townend | Willie Mullins |

== See also ==
- Horse racing in Ireland
- List of Irish National Hunt races
