= Florida Pearl Novice Chase =

Steeplechase horse race in Ireland

Florida Pearl Novice Chase
2025
Oscars Brother	Koktail Divin	Bossofthebrownies

Previous years
2024
Stellar Story	Search For Glory	Rainbow Trail
2023
Favori De Champdou	Sandor Clegane	Flooring Porter
2022
Darrens Hope	Minella Crooner	Amirite
2021
Vanillier	Fancy Foundations	Only two finished

2020-2011
2020
Pencilfulloflead	Latest Exhibition	Brace Yourself
2019
Battleoverdoyen	Any Second Now	Ex Patriot
2018
Some Neck	Blow By Blow	Nick Lost
2017
Jury Duty	Shattered Love	Presenting Percy
2016
A Toi Phil	Jetstream Jack	Disko
2015
Shantou Flyer	Captain Von Trappe	Killer Miller
2014
Shanahan's Turn	Indevan	Security Breach
2013
Morning Assembly	Don Cossack	Clonbanan Lad
2012
Back In Focus	Lyreen Legend	Sweeney Tunes
2011
Last Instalment	Four Commanders	Donnas Palm

2010-2001
2010
Thegreatjohnbrowne	Tharawaat	Sam Adams
2009
Aranleigh	Coolcashin	Fisher Bridge
2008
Trafford Lad	Window Of Hope	Siegemaster
2007
Santa's Son	Secretofshambhala	Only two finished
2006
Purple Shuffle	Vic Venturi	Mattock Ranger
2005
Slim Pickings	Kerryhead Windfarm	Mamouna Gale
2004
Forget The Past	Point Barrow	Mullacash
2003
Satco Express	Catalpa Cargo	True Blue Victory
2002
Barrow Drive	Come In Moscow	Doesheknow
2001
Michael Mor	Prince Dante	Regal Venture

2000-1991
2000
Limestone Lad	Idiot's Star	Mohera King
1999
Feathered Leader	Amarettoforanna	Montana Glen
1998
Gutteridge	His Song	Platonic-My-Eye
1997
Hill Society	Private Peace	Greenflag Princess
1996
Dorans Pride	The Subbie	Crehelp Express
1995
An Maineach	Double Symphony	Sea Gale
1994
Buck Rogers	Strong Platinum	Imperial Call
1992
General Idea	Kingston Way	Crawford Says
1991
Firions Law	Joyful Noise	Garamycin

1990-1988
1990
Larchmont	Renagown	Aughanvilla
1989
Maid Of Money	Fatal Hesitation	Flying Whisper
1988
Wolf Of Badenoch	Barney Burnett	Flying Ferret

The Florida Pearl Novice Chase is a Grade 2 National Hunt novice chase in Ireland which is open to horses aged five years or older. It is run at Punchestown over a distance of about 2 miles and 6½ furlongs (2 miles 6 furlongs and 140 yards, or 4,554 metres), and it is scheduled to take place each year in November.

The race is named in honour of Florida Pearl, who won a record four Irish Hennessy Gold Cups for Willie Mullins in the late 1990s and early 2000s.

The race was known as the Irish Field Novice Chase until 2006. It was awarded Grade 3 status in 2003 and then raised to Grade 2 in 2011.

== Records ==
Leading jockey since 1988 (3 wins):

- Barry Geraghty - Barrow Drive (2002), Forget The Past (2004), Purple Shuffle (2006)
- Ruby Walsh – Back In Focus (2012), Morning Assembly (2013), A Toi Phil (2016)

Leading trainer since 1988 (6 wins):

- Gordon Elliott - A Toi Phil (2016), Jury Duty (2017), Battleoverdoyen (2019), Pencilfulloflead (2020), Favori De Champdou (2023), Stellar Story (2024)

== Winners since 1988 ==
Year	Winner	Age	Jockey	Trainer
1988	Wolf Of Badenoch	7	Tommy Carmody	John Mulhern
1989	Maid Of Money	7	Anthony Powell	John Fowler
1990	Larchmont	9	Tom Taaffe	Michael Purcell
1991	Firions Law	6	M Flynn	Victor Bowens
1992	General Idea	7	Brendan Sheridan	Dermot Weld
1993	not held
1994	Buck Rogers	5	C N Bowens	Victor Bowens
1995	An Maineach	6	J M Donnelly	Capt Donald Swan
1996	Dorans Pride	7	Shane Broderick	Michael Hourigan
1997	Hill Society		Paul Carberry	Noel Meade
1998	Gutteridge		Tommy Treacy	P D Evans
1999	Feathered Leader	7	Conor O'Dwyer	Arthur Moore
2000	Limestone Lad	8	Barry Cash	James Bowe
2001	Michael Mor	7	Paul Carberry	Noel Meade
2002	Barrow Drive	6	Barry Geraghty	A Mullins
2003	Satco Express	7	Shay Barry	E Sheehy
2004	Forget The Past	6	Barry Geraghty	Michael O'Brien
2005	Slim Pickings	6	David Casey	Robert Tyner
2006	Purple Shuffle	8	Barry Geraghty	Pat Fahy
2007	Santa's Son	7	J L Cullen	J F O'Shea
2008	Trafford Lad	6	T J Doyle	E Sheehy
2009	Aranleigh	7	Mark Walsh	Anthony Mullins
2010	Thegreatjohnbrowne	6	Davy Condon	Noel Meade
2011	Last Instalment	6	Davy Russell	Philip Fenton
2012	Back In Focus	7	Ruby Walsh	Willie Mullins
2013	Morning Assembly	6	Ruby Walsh	Pat Fahy
2014	Shanahan's Turn	6	Johnny Burke	Henry de Bromhead
2015	Shantou Flyer	5	Mr Barry O'Neill	Colin Bowe
2016	A Toi Phil	6	Ruby Walsh	Gordon Elliott
2017	Jury Duty	6	Robbie Power	Gordon Elliott
2018	Some Neck	7	David Mullins	Willie Mullins
2019	Battleoverdoyen	6	Davy Russell	Gordon Elliott
2020	Pencilfulloflead	6	Rachael Blackmore	Gordon Elliott
2021	Vanillier	6	Keith Donoghue	Gavin Cromwell
2022	Darrens Hope	8	Danny Mullins	Robert Murphy
2023	Favori De Champdou	8	Jack Kennedy	Gordon Elliott
2024	Stellar Story	7	Jack Kennedy	Gordon Elliott
2025	Oscars Brother	7	Daniel King	Connor King
2026	Kiss Will	6	Paul Townend	Willie Mullins

== See also ==
- Horse racing in Ireland
- List of Irish National Hunt races
