= Grabel Mares Hurdle =

Hurdle horse race in Ireland

Grabel Mares Hurdle
2025
Feet Of A Dancer	Mozzies Sister	The Great Nudie

Previous years
2024
Lot of Joy	Risk Belle	Feet Of A Dancer
2023
Hispanic Moon	Saylavee	Broomfield Bijou
2022
Queens Brook	Heaven Help Us	Copper Nation
2021
Dysart Diamond	Royal Kahala	Western Victory

2020-2011
2020
Buildmeupbuttercup	Elimay	Black Tears
2019
Stormy Ireland	Black Tears	Eglantine Du Seuil
2018
Stormy Ireland	Good Thyne Tara	Ria D'etel
2017
Forge Meadow	Dawn Shadow	Barra
2016
Let's Dance	Shattered Love	Sweet Cherry
2015
Whiteout	Valyssa Monterg	Gitane Du Berlais
2014
Little King Robin	Melbourne Lady	Princess Leya
2013
Cailin Annamh	Little King Robin	Takeyourcapoff
2012
Tarla	Benny's Fagartha	Mae's Choice
2011
Jacksonslady	Bleakfield Lady	Elyaadi

2010-2005
2010
Voler La Vedette	Star Wood	Elyaadi
2009
Voler La Vedette	Give It Time	Loughaderra Dame
2008
Give It Time	Handfull Of Euros	Not Broke Yet
2007
Blazing Sky	Amber Trix	Pistol Flash
2006
Blazing Sky	Brogella	Celestial Wave
2005
Queen Astrid	Time On Your Side	Brogella

The Grabel Mares Hurdle is a Listed National Hunt hurdle race in Ireland which is open to mares aged four years or older. It is run at Punchestown over a distance of about 2 miles and 2 furlongs (2 miles 2 furlongs and 25 yards, or 3,644 metres), and it is scheduled to take place each year in November.

The race was first run in 2005 and was awarded Grade 3 status in 2012. It was downgraded to Listed for the 2014 season. Prior to 2015 it was run in October.

== Records ==
Most successful horse (2 wins):

- Blazing Sky – 2006, 2007
- Voler La Vedette - 2009, 2010
- Stormy Ireland - 2018, 2019

Leading jockey (4 wins):

- Barry Geraghty – Queen Astrid (2005), Voler La Vedette (2010), Jacksonslady (2011), Cailin Annamh (2013)

Leading trainer (8 wins):

- Willie Mullins - Tarla (2012), Whiteout (2015), Let's Dance (2016), Stormy Ireland (2018,2019), Buildmeupbuttercup (2020), Dysart Diamond (2021), Lot Of Joy (2024)

== Winners ==
Year	Winner	Age	Jockey	Trainer
2005	Queen Astrid	5	Barry Geraghty	Dermot Weld
2006	Blazing Sky	6	P W Flood	F F McGuinness
2007	Blazing Sky	7	P W Flood	F F McGuinness
2008	Give It Time	5	M J Bolger	Jessica Harrington
2009	Voler La Vedette	5	Sean Flanagan	Colm Murphy
2010	Voler La Vedette	6	Barry Geraghty	Colm Murphy
2011	Jacksonslady	6	Barry Geraghty	J P Dempsey
2012	Tarla	6	Ruby Walsh	Willie Mullins
2013	Cailin Annamh	5	Barry Geraghty	Jessica Harrington
2014	Little King Robin	6	Mark Walsh	Colin Bowe
2015	Whiteout	4	Danny Mullins	Willie Mullins
2016	Let's Dance	4	Ruby Walsh	Willie Mullins
2017	Forge Meadow	5	Robbie Power	Jessica Harrington
2018	Stormy Ireland	4	Ruby Walsh	Willie Mullins
2019	Stormy Ireland	5	Paul Townend	Willie Mullins
2020	Buildmeupbuttercup	6	Paul Townend	Willie Mullins
2021	Dysart Diamond	6	Bryan Cooper	Willie Mullins
2022	Queens Brook	7	Jack Kennedy	Gordon Elliott
2023	Hispanic Moon	6	Darragh O'Keeffe	Henry de Bromhead
2024	Lot Of Joy	6	Paul Townend	Willie Mullins
2025	Feet Of A Dancer	6	Sean O'Keeffe	Paul Nolan
2026	Daboya	5	Daniel King	Richard Donohoe

== See also ==
- Horse racing in Ireland
- List of Irish National Hunt races
