= Moscow Flyer Novice Hurdle =

Hurdle horse race in Ireland

Moscow Flyer Novice Hurdle
2026
Sober	Road Exile	Free Spirit

Previous years
2025
Salvator Mundi	Kel Histoire	Relieved Of Duties
2024
Mystical Power	Jigoro	James's Gate
2023
Impaire Et Passe	The Model Kingdom	Shecouldbeanything
2022
Dysart Dynamo	Gringo D'aubrelle	The Little Yank
2021
Dreal Deal	Ganapathi	Power Of Pause

2020-2011
2020
Andy Dufresne	Captain Guinness	Anything Will Do
2019
Felix Desjy	Jetez	Harrie
2018
Getabird	Mengli Khan	Carter Mckay
2017
Any Second Now	Crack Mome	Runfordave
2016
Min	Attribution	Ball D'arc
2015
Douvan	Alpha Des Obeaux	Marinero
2014
Vautour	Western Boy	Mr Fiftyone
2013
Mozoltov	Don Cossack	Ned Buntline
2012
Trifolium	Simenon	Caolaneoin
2011
Gagewell Flyer	Earlson Gray	Tornedo Shay

2010-2003
2010
Luska Lad	Saludos	Start Me Up
2009
Mikael D'haguenet	Donnas Palm	Fosters Cross
2008
Mister Watzisname	Raven's Run	Fond Of A Drop
2007
Orbit O'gold	De Valira	Holly Tree
2006
Mounthenry	Iktitaf	Tolpuddle
2005
Justified	Blazing Liss	Man About Town
2004
Kahuna	Euro Leader	Green Belt Flyer
2003
Kicking King	Central House	Woodys Deep Ocean

The Moscow Flyer Novice Hurdle is a Grade 2 National Hunt hurdle race in Ireland. It is run at Punchestown Racecourse in January, over a distance of about 2 miles (3,219 metres) and during the race there are nine hurdles to be jumped. The race was first run in 2003 and was called the Byrne Group Novice Hurdle, before changing its name in 2009 to honour the racehorse, Moscow Flyer.

== Records ==
Leading jockey (6 wins):

- Paul Townend - Gagewell Flyer (2011), Vautour (2014), Dysart Dynamo (2022), Impaire Et Passe (2023), Salvator Mundi (2025), Sober (2026)

Leading trainer (12 wins):

- Willie Mullins – Mikael D'Haguenet (2009), Gagewell Flyer (2011), Mozoltov (2013), Vautour (2014), Douvan (2015), Min (2016), Getabird (2018), Dysart Dynamo (2022), Impaire Et Passe (2023), Mystical Power (2024), Salvator Mundi (2025), Sober (2026)

== Winners ==
Year	Winner	Age	Jockey	Trainer
2003	Kicking King		Barry Geraghty	Tom Taaffe
2004	Kahuna		Shay Barry	Dusty Sheehy
2005	Justified		Mick Fitzgerald	Dusty Sheehy
2006	Mounthenry		Andrew McNamara	Charles Byrnes
2007	Orbit O'Gold		Niall Madden	Noel Meade
2008	Mister Watzisname		Paul Carberry	Henry De Bromhead
2009	Mikael D'Haguenet	5	Ruby Walsh	Willie Mullins
2010	Luska Lad		Andrew McNamara	John Hanlon
2011	Gagewell Flyer		Paul Townend	Willie Mullins
2012	Trifolium		Davy Russell	Charles Byrnes
2013	Mozoltov	7	Ruby Walsh	Willie Mullins
2014	Vautour	5	Paul Townend	Willie Mullins
2015	Douvan	5	Ruby Walsh	Willie Mullins
2016	Min	5	Ruby Walsh	Willie Mullins
2017	Any Second Now	5	Mark Walsh	Ted Walsh
2018	Getabird	6	Patrick Mullins (Note: amateur jockey)	Willie Mullins
2019	Felix Desjy	6	Sean Flanagan	Gordon Elliott
2020	Andy Dufresne	6	Mark Walsh	Gordon Elliott
2021	Dreal Deal	6	Denis O'Regan	Ronan McNally
2022	Dysart Dynamo	6	Paul Townend	Willie Mullins
2023	Impaire Et Passe	5	Paul Townend	Willie Mullins
2024	Mystical Power	5	Mark Walsh	Willie Mullins
2025	Salvator Mundi	5	Paul Townend	Willie Mullins
2026	Sober	7	Paul Townend	Willie Mullins

== See also ==
- Horse racing in Ireland
- List of Irish National Hunt races
