= Skymas Chase =

Steeplechase horse race in Ireland

Skymas Chase
2026
Kala Conti	Jacob's Ladder	Herja

Previous years
2025
Firefox	Gorgeous Tom	Croke Park
2024
Found A Fifty	Pinkerton	Lucid Dreams
2023
Ash Tree Meadow	Visionarian	Only two ran
2022
Fury Road	Delvino	Vanillier
2021
Envoi Allen	Echoes Of Family	Fairyhill Run

2020-2011
2020
Battleoverdoyen	Easy Game	Samcro
2019
Real Steel	Secret Investor	Minella Fair
2018
Snow Falcon	Shattered Love	Monalee
2017
Disko	Ballyoisin	Ball D'arc
2016
Sub Lieutenant	Outlander	Le Mercurey
2015
Ptit Zig	Clarcam	Shadow Catcher
2014
Don Cossack	Wonderful Charm	Burn And Turn
2013
Rolling Aces	Toner D'Oudairies	Texas Jack
2012
Cristal Bonus	Jacksonslady	Imperial Shabra
2011
Kauto Stone	Roi Du Mee	Blazing Tempo

2010-2001
2010
The Nightingale	Roberto Goldback	Osana
2009
Herecomesthetruth	Forpadydeplasterer	Siegemaster
2008
Noland	Finger Onthe Pulse	Sky's The Limit
2007
One Cool Cookie	Finished alone
2006
In Compliance	Wild Passion	Desperado Queen
2004
Murphy's Cardinal	Mossy Green	Splendour
2003
Splendour	Schwartzhalle	I'vehadit
2002
Moscow Flyer	Kadarann	Fiery Ring
2001
Killultagh Storm	Arctic Copper	Knife Edge

2000-1999
2000
Rathbawn Prince	To Your Honour	Fleur Du Chenet
1999
Siberian Gale	Native Estates	Ollimar

The Skymas Chase is a Grade 2 National Hunt steeplechase in Ireland which is open to horses aged five years or older. It is run at Down Royal over a distance of about 2 miles and 3½ furlongs (2 miles, 3 furlongs and 120 yards, or 3,931 metres), and it is scheduled to take place each year in November.

The race was first run in 1999. It was awarded Grade 3 status in 2003 and then raised again in 2009, to Grade 2 status. Prior to 2003 the race was run over 2 miles and 2 furlongs.

The race is named after Skymas, winner of the Queen Mother Champion Chase in 1976 and 1977, who was trained near Down Royal. It has been run under various sponsored titles since its inauguration.

== Records ==
Leading jockey since 1999 (4 wins):

- Barry Geraghty – Killultagh Storm (2001), Moscow Flyer (2002), Splendour (2003), In Compliance (2006)

Leading trainer since 1999 (7 wins):

- Paul Nicholls – Noland (2008), Herecomesthetruth (2009), The Nightingale (2010), Kauto Stone (2011), Cristal Bonus (2012), Rolling Aces (2013), Ptit Zig (2015)
- Gordon Elliott - Don Cossack (2014), Battleoverdoyen (2020), Fury Road (2022), Ash Tree Meadow (2023), Found A Fifty (2024), Firefox (2025), Kala Conti (2026)

== Winners since 2001 ==
Year	Winner	Age	Jockey	Trainer
1999	Siberian Gale	7	Tommy Treacy	Paddy Mullins
2000	Rathbawn Prince	8	Kieran Kelly	Dessie Hughes
2001	Killultagh Storm	7	Barry Geraghty	Willie Mullins
2002	Moscow Flyer	8	Barry Geraghty	Jessica Harrington
2003	Splendour	8	Barry Geraghty	Suzanne Cox
2004	Murphy's Cardinal	8	Seamus Durack	Noel Chance
2005	no race 2005 (Note: The 2005 running was abandoned after bomb warnings were telephoned to the racecourse)
2006	In Compliance	6	Barry Geraghty	Michael O'Brien
2007	One Cool Cookie	6	David Casey	Charlie Swan
2008	Noland	7	Ruby Walsh	Paul Nicholls
2009	Herecomesthetruth	7	Christian Williams	Paul Nicholls
2010	The Nightingale	7	Ruby Walsh	Paul Nicholls
2011	Kauto Stone	5	Paul Carberry	Paul Nicholls
2012	Cristal Bonus	6	Daryl Jacob	Paul Nicholls
2013	Rolling Aces	7	Nick Scholfield	Paul Nicholls
2014	Don Cossack	7	Bryan Cooper	Gordon Elliott
2015	Ptit Zig	6	Sam Twiston-Davies	Paul Nicholls
2016	Sub Lieutenant	7	David Mullins	Henry de Bromhead
2017	Disko	6	Sean Flanagan	Noel Meade
2018	Snow Falcon	8	Sean Flanagan	Noel Meade
2019	Real Steel	6	Paul Townend	Willie Mullins
2020	Battleoverdoyen	7	Mark Walsh	Gordon Elliott
2021	Envoi Allen	7	Rachael Blackmore	Henry de Bromhead
2022	Fury Road	8	Jack Kennedy	Gordon Elliott
2023	Ash Tree Meadow	7	Jack Kennedy	Gordon Elliott
2024	Found A Fifty	7	Sam Ewing	Gordon Elliott
2025	Firefox	7	Jack Kennedy	Gordon Elliott
2026	Kala Conti	6	Danny Gilligan	Gordon Elliott

== See also ==
- Horse racing in Ireland
- List of Irish National Hunt races
