= Sizing Europe =

Irish-bred Thoroughbred racehorse

- Sire: Pistolet Bleu
- Grandsire: Top Ville
- Dam: Jennie Dun
- Damsire: Mandalus
- Sex: Gelding
- Foaled: 24 March 2002
- Country: Ireland
- Colour: Bay
- Breeder: Mrs Angela Bracken
- Owner: Ann & Alan Potts Partnership
- Trainer: Henry De Bromhead
- Jockey: Andrew Lynch
- Record: 42: 21-10-3
- Earnings: £1,315,248

Major wins
- Greatwood Handicap Hurdle (2007); Irish Champion Hurdle (2008); Craddockstown Novice Chase (2009); Bord Na Mona Novice Chase (2009); Arkle Challenge Trophy (2010); Queen Mother Champion Chase (2011); Gowran Park Champion Chase (2011, 2012, 2013, 2014); Tingle Creek Chase (2011); Tied Cottage Chase (2012, 2013); Punchestown Champion Chase (2012, 2014); Clonmel Oil Chase (2012); Paddy Power Dial-A-Bet Chase (2012)

Awards
- Anglo-Irish Champion Two Mile Hurdler (2008); Anglo-Irish Champion Novice Chaser (2010); Anglo-Irish Champion Two Mile Chaser (2011)

Sizing Europe (24 March 2002) is an Irish National Hunt horse, best known for winning the 2011 Queen Mother Champion Chase at Cheltenham. He won the Irish Champion Hurdle in 2008 before switching to chasing, where he has won six Grade 1s over fences.

== Breeding ==
Sizing Europe is a bay gelding with a white star and white socks on his hind feet bred in Ireland by Angela Bracken. He was sired by Pistolet Bleu, winner of the Group 1 Critérium de Saint-Cloud and Group 1 Grand Prix de Saint-Cloud. His best flat winner has been the Prix Hocquart and Prix Greffulhe winner Maille Pistol, but he is best known as a National Hunt sire, with his jumpers including Geos (Christmas Hurdle), Katarino (Triumph Hurdle) and the Grand National runner-up Cappa Bleu. Sizing Europe's dam is Jennie Dun, a mare by Mandalus. As a descendant of the broodmare Simone Vergnes, she was a distant relative of the 1943 Oaks Stakes winner, Why Hurry.

Sizing Europe was offered for sale as a foal at the Tattersalls Ireland sale in November 2002 and was bought for €9000 by the bloodstock agent Hugh Bleahen. He entered the ownership of Ann and Alan Potts and was sent into training with Henry de Bromhead in County Waterford.

== Racing career ==
=== Early career ===
Sizing Europe made his racing debut as a four-year-old in a National Hunt Flat race at Leopardstown, where he was second to De Valira. He ran in a similar event at Limerick for a fifth-place finish before winning at Naas. With a victory under his belt, he was switched to hurdling.

Sizing Europe made a winning debut over hurdles in the City Inn Maiden Hurdle at Newbury in November. Sent off at 8/1, he beat the 2/1 favourite Carlitos by three quarters of a length. The Queen's horse Barber Shop was fourteen lengths away in third. He then finished behind De Valira in two Grade 2 novice hurdles at Leopardstown and Fairyhouse, before beating future Champion Chase winner Big Zeb in a race at Punchestown. He was afterwards put away for the autumn.

=== 2007/2008 National Hunt Season: Hurdling ===
Sizing Europe's campaign got off to a rocky start when he fell at the second last flight in a Listed hurdle at Punchestown. He rebounded in the Greatwood Handicap Hurdle at Cheltenham where he beat the subsequent Champion Hurdle second Osana by four lengths. This display boosted his position in the Champion Hurdle market. Sizing Europe further boosted his Champion Hurdle claims with a win in the Grade 1 Irish Champion Hurdle at Leopardstown in January. In the race, he beat dual Champion Hurdler Hardy Eustace by eight lengths and was promoted to favourite for the big race in March.

In the Champion Hurdle, Sizing Europe travelled well and seemed poised to challenge in the homestraight before weakening rapidly and being virtually pulled up by jockey Andrew McNamara. His trainer, Henry De Bromhead, later reported that the horse had injured his back.

=== 2008/2009 National Hunt Season: Hurdling ===
Sizing Europe returned in November in the Grade 1 Maplewood Developments Hurdle, where he finished second to Hardy Eustace. He then ran in the Grade 1 December Festival Hurdle at Punchestown and finished fifth behind 2007 Champion Hurdle winner Sublimity. Sizing Europe missed the 2009 Champion Hurdle due to injury and ran one last time over hurdles in the Punchestown Champion Hurdle, where he finished fourth behind multiple Grade 1 winner Solwhit and Champion Hurdler Punjabi.

=== 2009/2010 National Hunt Season: Novice chasing ===
Sizing Europe was then switched to fences for a novice chasing campaign. He first won a beginners chase at Punchestown in May before progressing to a win in the Grade 3 Buck House Novice Chase, where he beat Grade 1 hurdler Harchibald by seventeen lengths. Sizing Europe next won the Grade 2 Craddockstown Novice Chase at Punchestown, bringing his tally over fences to three out of three. The Grade 1 Bord Na Mona Novice Chase saw a clash between Sizing Europe (evens favourite), 2008 Supreme Novices' Hurdle winner Captain Cee Bee and former Champion Hurdle runner up Osana. Sizing Europe led turning into the straight, but Captain Cee Bee appeared to be travelling the better. However, that rival fell at the last, leaving Sizing Europe to win by over five lengths from Osana.

Despite the result of the Bord Na Mona Novice Chase, Captain Cee Bee was sent off the 5/2 favourite in the Arkle Challenge Trophy at Cheltenham, with Sizing Europe rated a 6/1 shot. He raced prominently throughout, took the lead two out, and held off the late charge of Grade 1 winner Somersby. Sizing Europe ended his season by taking on more experienced chasers in the Grade 1 Punchestown Champion Chase, where he finished third behind Golden Silver and 2009 Arkle winner Forpadydeplasterer.

=== 2010/2011 National Hunt season: Chasing ===
Sizing Europe started off his second chasing season in the Grade 3 Star Chase over 2 miles 7 furlongs, with a view to stepping up to staying chases and perhaps a crack at the Cheltenham Gold Cup. However, he lost to China Rock by seven lengths. In his next race, he took on the dual Cheltenham Gold Cup winner Kauto Star in the Grade 1 JNwine.com Champion Chase over three miles. Kauto Star won by four lengths. The plan had been for Sizing Europe to tackle the prestigious King George VI Chase over three miles at Kempton on Boxing Day, but when that race was postponed due to frost, he was rerouted to the Grade 2 Tied Cottage Chase over two miles. He finished third behind Golden Silver and multiple Grade 1 winner Big Zeb.

Sizing Europe was kept at two miles for his next start in the Grade 1 Queen Mother Champion Chase at the Cheltenham Festival in March. Amongst the opposition were dual Champion Chase winner Master Minded, 2010 winner Big Zeb, and Golden Silver. Tracking the leader throughout, Sizing Europe jumped to the front at the seventh fence and finished strongly to beat Big Zeb by five lengths. In a historic race, Irish horses occupied the first four places. In his final race of the season, Sizing Europe was beaten by Big Zeb in the Punchestown Champion Chase, losing by three quarters of a length after being overtaken at the final fence.

=== 2011/2012 National Hunt season: Chasing ===
Sizing Europe started off his campaign in the Grade 2 Gowran Park Champion Chase over 2 miles 4 furlongs. He held off Coolcashin to win by 1.75 lengths with Grade 1 winner Rubi Light far behind in third. He then tackled the JNwine.com Champion Chase for the second year in a row, but, on very soft ground, his stamina gave out in the final furlong and he was passed by the staying on Quito De La Roque. Sizing Europe rebounded with a win in the Grade 1 Tingle Creek Chase over two miles at Sandown. He defeated Kauto Star's half brother Kauto Stone by eight lengths as the 11/8 favourite. He then won the Grade 2 Tied Cottage Chase, gaining revenge on Big Zeb in a three-runner race and being cut to 6/4 for the Champion Chase.

Sizing Europe was sent off the 4/5F in the Champion Chase and was beaten just over a length in a controversial running. Front runner Wishfull Thinking fell at the fourth fence (the last one the final circuit) and crashed through railings into a crowd of photographers. His jockey Richard Johnson was still lying prone by the time the field had races round the course, so officials made the decision to bypass the fence. However, the signs were unclear, so Andrew Lynch on Sizing Europe and Barry Geraghty on Finian's Rainbow were unsure of whether to jump it or not until very close to the fence. Both horses had to change course sharply, and some onlookers felt that Sizing Europe lost the most momentum, although Finian's Rainbow proved the result was no fluke with a win in the Grade 1 Melling Chase a few weeks later. Returning to Ireland, Sizing Europe won the Punchestown Champion Chase at the third attempt, holding off Grade 1 winner Realt Dubh by 2.25 lengths.

=== 2012/2013 National Hunt season: Chasing ===
Sizing Europe again ran in the Grade 2 Gowran Park Champion Chase, winning by over seven lengths from Forpadydeplasterer. He followed up in the Grade 2 Clonmel Oil Chase over the same distance, beating Magnaminity by twenty lengths. Sizing Europe dropped back to two miles for the Grade 1 Paddy Power Dial-A-Bet Chase at the Leopardstown Christmas Festival. He beat Rubi Light by two and a half lengths with Big Zeb back in fourth. He remained second favourite for the Champion Chase at 8/1.

He prepped for Cheltenham with a second win in the Tied Cottage Chase, where he beat Foildubh by ten lengths. This was his fourth consecutive win of the season. Henry De Bromhead originally entered Sizing Europe in the Champion Chase, Ryanair Chase and Cheltenham Gold Cup. Although he was withdrawn from the Gold Cup on 12 February, he was not committed to either of the other two races. On 11 March, Henry De Bromhead confirmed that Sizing Europe would face Sprinter Sacre in the Queen Mother Champion Chase. At the Cheltenham Festival, Sizing Europe finished second to the undefeated chaser Sprinter Sacre in the Queen Mother Champion Chase. He took the lead at the ninth fence but was passed by the younger horse three fences from home. Sizing Europe stumbled rounding the turn for home but stayed on to finish a clear second, albeit nineteen lengths behind the winner.

Sizing Europe's final run of the season came in the Grade 1 Punchestown Champion Chase, where he again faced Sprinter Sacre, who had won the Grade 1 Melling Chase at Aintree in the meantime. Although Sizing Europe pushed Sprinter Sacre, the latter was victorious by five and a half lengths.

=== 2013/2014 National Hunt season: Chasing ===
Sizing Europe made his seasonal debut in the Grade 2 Gowran Park Champion Chase, which he won for the third consecutive year, beating Arkle runner up Bailey Green by a length and a quarter. He then contested the Grade 1 JNWine. Com Champion Chase for the third time, but despite being sent off the 9/4 joint favourite, was beaten thirteen lengths by Roi Du Mee. Trainer Henry de Bromhead indicated that this would be the last time that Sizing Europe raced over three miles, and that the Dial-A-Bet Chase over two miles was his next target. In the Dial-A-Bet Chase, he started 11/4 second favourite, but after leading until the second last, he weakened in the closing stages and finished fourth behind Benefficient.

On 12 March, Sizing Europe ran in his fourth consecutive Champion Chase at the Cheltenham Festival. At twelve years old, he was the oldest horse in the field and started at odds of 11/1. He was in contention throughout the race and finished fourth behind Sire de Grugy, Somersby and Module. Sizing Europe ended his season in the Boylesports.com Champion Chase at Punchestown on 29 April when he started 7/1 third choice in the betting behind Hidden Cyclone and Somersby. He took the lead at the ninth of the eleven fences before going clear approaching the last and won by five and a half lengths from Ballynagour. After the race, Alan Potts described the horse as being "back to his brilliant best".

=== 2014/2015 National Hunt season: Chasing ===
Once again, Sizing Europe began his season in the PWC Champion Chase at Gowran Park in October and started 9/4 second favourite behind the Galway Plate winner Road To Riches, to whom he was conceding four pounds. Ridden for the first time by Jonathan Burke, he raced just behind the leaders for most of the way before staying on strongly in the closing stages, overtaking Road To Riches in the final strides and winning by a head. After the race, de Bromhead said, "It was just incredible. It's like he's taking the Mickey, leaving it until the very end. He's still loving it and you can see there he's got the heart of a lion." In December Sizing Europe attempted to repeat his 2012 success in the Clonmel Oil Chase. After briefly reaching second place he faded in the closing stages and finished sixth of the seven runners behind Champagne Fever.

Sizing Europe ran in the Queen Mother Champion Chase for the fifth time on 11 March 2015, for which his opponents included Sprinter Sacre and Sire de Grugy.

Following his retirement, Sizing Europe was taken into the care of the Irish Horse Welfare Trust.

== Pedigree ==
Pedigree of Sizing Europe (IRE), bay gelding, 2002
Sire Pistolet Bleu (IRE) 1988	Top Ville (IRE); 1976	High Top	Derring-Do
Sire Pistolet Bleu (IRE) 1988	Top Ville (IRE); 1976	High Top	Camenae
Sire Pistolet Bleu (IRE) 1988	Top Ville (IRE); 1976	Sega Ville	Charlottesville
Sire Pistolet Bleu (IRE) 1988	Top Ville (IRE); 1976	Sega Ville	La Sega
Sire Pistolet Bleu (IRE) 1988	Pampa Balla (FR); 1981	Armos	Mossborough
Sire Pistolet Bleu (IRE) 1988	Pampa Balla (FR); 1981	Armos	Ardelle
Sire Pistolet Bleu (IRE) 1988	Pampa Balla (FR); 1981	Kendie	Klairon
Sire Pistolet Bleu (IRE) 1988	Pampa Balla (FR); 1981	Kendie	Amagalla
Dam Jennie Dun (IRE) 1994	Mandalus (IRE); 1974	Mandamus	Petition
Dam Jennie Dun (IRE) 1994	Mandalus (IRE); 1974	Mandamus	Great Fun
Dam Jennie Dun (IRE) 1994	Mandalus (IRE); 1974	Laminate	Abernant
Dam Jennie Dun (IRE) 1994	Mandalus (IRE); 1974	Laminate	Lamri
Dam Jennie Dun (IRE) 1994	Lakelands Girl (IRE); 1980	Deep Run	Pampered King
Dam Jennie Dun (IRE) 1994	Lakelands Girl (IRE); 1980	Deep Run	Trial By Fire
Dam Jennie Dun (IRE) 1994	Lakelands Girl (IRE); 1980	Charlie Girl	Vic Day
Dam Jennie Dun (IRE) 1994	Lakelands Girl (IRE); 1980	Charlie Girl	Polperro (Family: 14-b)
