= Paddy's Reward Club Chase =

Steeplechase horse race in Ireland

Paddy's Reward Club Chase
2025
Solness	Marine Nationale	Majborough

Previous years
2024
Solness	Gaelic Warrior	Marine Nationale
2023
Dinoblue	Gentleman De Mee	Saint Roi
2022
Blue Lord	Captain Guinness	Chacun Pour Soi
2021
Envoi Allen	Battleoverdoyen	Only two finished

2020-2011
2020
Chacun Pour Soi	Notebook	Put The Kettle On
2019
A Plus Tard	Chacun Pour Soi	Ordinary World
2018
Simply Ned	Footpad	Ordinary World
2017
Simply Ned	Min	Ordinary World
2016
Douvan	Sizing John	Simply Ned
2015
Flemenstar	Simply Ned	Hidden Cyclone
2014
Twinlight	Hidden Cyclone	Simply Ned
2013
Benefficient	Hidden Cyclone	Arvika Ligeonniere
2012
Sizing Europe	Rubi Light	Edgardo Sol
2011
Big Zeb	Noble Prince	Forpadydeplasterer

2010-2001
2010
Big Zeb	Golden Silver	Scotsirish
2009
Golden Silver	Tranquil Sea	Scotsirish
2008
Big Zeb	Watson Lake	Thyne Again
2007
Mansony	Nickname	Schindlers Hunt
2006
Nickname	Central House	Hi Cloy
2005
Hi Cloy	Fota Island	Central House
2004
Central House	Native Scout	Native Upmanship
2003
Moscow Flyer	Native Scout	Knife Edge
2002
Moscow Flyer	Knife Edge	Go Roger Go
2001
Knife Edge	Alcapone	Zourito

2000-1998
2000
Papillon	To Your Honour	Miles Byrne
1999
Merry Gale	Ollimar	Hill Society
1998
Papillon	Klairon Davis	Opera Hat

The Paddy's Reward Club Chase is a Grade 1 National Hunt steeplechase in Ireland. It is run at Leopardstown Racecourse in December, over a distance of about 2 miles and 1 furlong (3,420 metres) and during the race there are 11 fences to be jumped. The race was first run in 1998 as a Listed race, before being run as a Grade 1 race from 2007 onwards. The race is sponsored by Paddy Power bookmakers and has had various titles promoting Paddy Power products during its history. The 2019 race was run as the Paddy's Rewards Club "Loyalty's Dead, Live For Rewards" Chase.

== Records ==
Most successful horse (3 wins):

- Big Zeb – 2008, 2010, 20011

Leading jockey (3 wins):

- Ruby Walsh – Papillon (1998, 2000), Douvan (2016)
- Barry Geraghty – Moscow Flyer (2002, 2003), Big Zeb (2010)
- Paul Townend - Golden Silver (2009), Twinlight (2014), Chacun Pour Soi (2020)
- Mark Walsh - Simply Ned (2017,2018), Dinoblue (2023)

Leading trainer (6 wins):

- Willie Mullins - Golden Silver (2009), Twinlight (2014), Douvan (2016), Chacun Pour Soi (2020), Blue Lord (2022), Dinoblue (2023)

== Winners ==
Year	Winner	Age	Jockey	Trainer
1998	Papillon	7	Ruby Walsh	Ted Walsh
1999	Merry Gale	11	Paul Moloney	Jim Dreaper
2000	Papillon	9	Ruby Walsh	Ted Walsh
2001	Knife Edge	6	Tom Rudd	Michael O'Brien
2002	Moscow Flyer	8	Barry Geraghty	Jessica Harrington
2003	Moscow Flyer	9	Barry Geraghty	Jessica Harrington
2004	Central House	7	Paul Carberry	Dessie Hughes
2005	Hi Cloy	8	Andrew McNamara	Michael Hourigan
2006	Nickname	7	Niall Madden	Martin Brassil
2007	Mansony	8	Davy Russell	Arthur Moore
2008	Big Zeb	7	Matt O'Connor	Colm Murphy
2009	Golden Silver	7	Paul Townend	Willie Mullins
2010	Big Zeb	9	Barry Geraghty	Colm Murphy
2011	Big Zeb	10	Robbie Power	Colm Murphy
2012	Sizing Europe	10	Andrew Lynch	Henry de Bromhead
2013	Benefficient	7	Bryan Cooper	Tony Martin
2014	Twinlight	7	Paul Townend	Willie Mullins
2015	Flemenstar	10	Andrew Lynch	Anthony Curran
2016	Douvan	6	Ruby Walsh	Willie Mullins
2017	Simply Ned (Note: Min finished first in 2017 but was placed second after a stewards' enquiry for causing interference to Simply Ned)	10	Mark Walsh	Nicky Richards
2018	Simply Ned	11	Mark Walsh	Nicky Richards
2019	A Plus Tard	5	Rachael Blackmore	Henry de Bromhead
2020	Chacun Pour Soi	8	Paul Townend	Willie Mullins
2021	Envoi Allen	7	Rachael Blackmore	Henry de Bromhead
2022	Blue Lord	7	Daryl Jacob	Willie Mullins
2023	Dinoblue	6	Mark Walsh	Willie Mullins
2024	Solness	6	JJ Slevin	Joseph O'Brien
2025	Solness	7	Sam Ewing	Joseph O'Brien

== See also ==
- Horse racing in Ireland
- List of Irish National Hunt races
