= Moscow Flyer =

Irish Thoroughbred racehorse

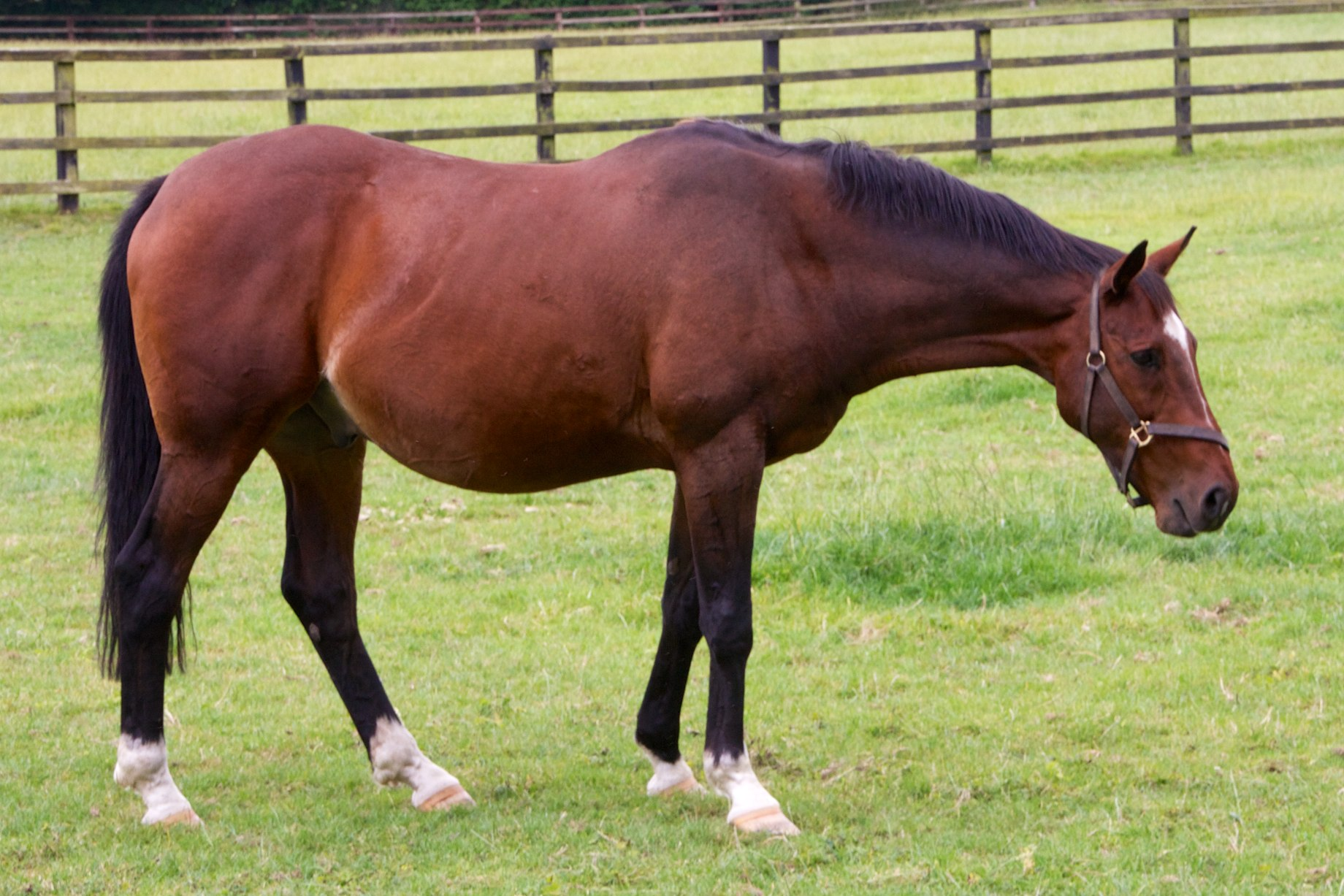
- Moscow Flyer at Irish National Stud in 2013.
- Sire: Moscow Society
- Grandsire: Nijinsky
- Dam: Meelick Lady
- Damsire: Duky
- Sex: Gelding
- Foaled: 10 May 1994
- Country: Ireland
- Colour: Bay
- Breeder: Edward Joyce
- Owner: Brian Kearney
- Trainer: Jessica Harrington
- Record: 45: 27-4-3
- Earnings: £1,167,892

Major wins
- Royal Bond Novice Hurdle (1999); Punchestown Champion Novice Hurdle (2000); Morgiana Hurdle (2000); December Festival Hurdle (2000); Punchestown Champion Hurdle (2000); Denny Gold Medal Novice Chase (2001); Craddockstown Novice Chase (2001); Arkle Challenge Trophy (2002); Skymas Chase (2002); Swordlestown Cup Novice Chase (2002); Paddy Power Dial-A-Bet Chase (2002, 2003); Tied Cottage Chase (2003, 2005); Queen Mother Champion Chase (2003, 2005); Fortria Chase (2003, 2004); Tingle Creek Chase (2003, 2004); Melling Chase (2004, 2005); Punchestown Champion Chase (2004); Timeform rating: 184

Honours
- Moscow Flyer Novice Hurdle at Punchestown Racecourse
- Last updated on 13 December 2022

Moscow Flyer (10 May 1994 – 21 October 2016) was an Irish-bred and -trained National Hunt horse who ran over distances between 2 miles and 2 1/2 miles (3.2–4 km). A top-class horse who achieved a Timeform rating of 184, he won the Queen Mother Champion Chase in 2003 and 2005, the Tingle Creek Chase in 2003 and 2004 and the Arkle Challenge Trophy in 2002.

== Background ==
Moscow Flyer was a bay horse with a white blaze and four white socks bred in Ireland by Edward Joyce. He was sired by Moscow Society, a son of Nijinsky, who showed good form in a brief racing career before becoming a successful National Hunt stallion.

He was trained by Jessica Harrington and ridden in most of his races by Barry Geraghty.

== Racing career ==
=== Early career ===
Moscow Flyer never won a Bumper. He came third in two of his four bumpers, but never was first past the post. He was quickly changed to hurdling after the usual one season of competing in bumpers.

He started off as a close to top-class hurdler. He won the 2000 December Festival Hurdle claiming the notable scalp of Istabraq who fell at the last when in contention. Moscow Flyer himself fell two out in that season's Grade 1 AIG Europe Champion Hurdle when in contention. He was entered in the 2001 Champion Hurdle but Foot and Mouth caused the Cheltenham Festival to be abandoned.

=== 2001/2002 season: Novice chases ===
Moscow Flyer returned in the 2001/2002 season as a novice chaser. His record coming into the Arkle Challenge Trophy was mixed. He had won three races but also fallen twice. Consequently, Seebald went off as favourite. However, Moscow Flyer won easily by four lengths. That year's Champion Hurdle was won with a Racing Post Rating four below Moscow Flyer's highest rating of 170 achieved the previous April at Punchestown.

=== 2002/2003 season: steeplechases ===
Moscow Flyer returned to the Festival for the 2003 Queen Mother Champion Chase having won four races out of five that season. In his only defeat, reigning champion Flagship Uberalles made a very bad mistake at one fence in the Tingle Creek Chase at Sandown. Moscow Flyer was behind him and was unable to avoid running into the back of him and unshipping Barry Geraghty. He started as a short-priced 7/4 favourite for the Champion Chase and won by 7 lengths.

=== 2003/2004 season ===
Moscow Flyer won his first three races of the season and again was the favourite for the Queen Mother Champion Chase. He started at 5/6 while his main rival Azertyuiop was the 15/8 second favourite. His rival had won the previous season's Arkle Challenge Trophy and the race was seen as a match between the two despite the presence of Flagship Uberalles and Tiutchev. However, Moscow Flyer made a mistake four out and gave Geraghty no chance of staying on him. Azertyuiop went on to an easy victory.

=== 2004/2005 season ===
Moscow Flyer returned the next year to try to be the first horse in many years to regain the Queen Mother Champion Chase. He retained his Tingle Creek Chase crown and broke his odd record of falling every four races. Opposing him were Azertyuiop at 2/1 and a new challenger in the previous year's Arkle Challenge Trophy winner Well Chief at 7/2. Strong betting support on the day made Moscow Flyer the 6/4 favourite. Azertyuiop made a mistake at the water jump and although he came third he was not in contention for the last half of the race. Moscow Flyer held off the challenge of Well Chief to the cheers of his fans. His subsequent win at Aintree was his seventh in a row. Moscow Flyer lost by a short-head at Punchestown to Rathgar Beau on 26 April 2005. Many thought that there was a dead heat, but the stewards awarded the race to Rathgar Beau. This horse was the first to beat Moscow Flyer when he didn't fall since Colonel Yeagar on 18 April 2001.

=== 2005/2006 season ===
Moscow Flyer was aimed to win the Queen Mother Champion Chase for a third time. He suffered another defeat to Central House at Navan in the Fortria Chase, a defeat clear from the landing after the last, that silenced the crowd. A further defeat followed in December by Hi Cloy at Leopardstown in a race best remembered for Roger Loughran's mistake as to the whereabouts of the finishing line. Subsequently, Moscow Flyer ran in the Champion Chase, entering the field without a win that year. He went off at 5/1 and finished fifth. He was retired immediately after the race.

== Retirement ==
Moscow Flyer spent some time as a pin-up pony for retired racehorses in Ireland. He was in good health on a return to Sandown in 2006 for a parade before the Tingle Creek—and again before the Champion Chase at Cheltenham. In April 2007, in the closing race of the Punchestown Festival, a 2-Mile Charity Flat Race, Moscow Flyer recorded his first ever flat victory. Ridden by the Irish 18-year-old Kate Harrington, Moscow won comfortably and was giving a rousing reception in the winners' enclosure postrace.

Moscow Flyer was in retirement with the Irish Horse Welfare Trust (IHWT) at their farm in Woodenbridge, Co Wicklow. He made public appearances for the Charity to help promote the work of the equine welfare charity and had many visitors throughout the year. Moscow Flyer was offered a place at the Irish National Stud in County Kildare, Ireland in spring 2012. His owner, former trainer, and staff at the IHWT decided that this was a great opportunity to afford more people a chance to see a true champion racehorse and an ambassador for equine welfare. He resided at the national stud with a number of other famous racehorses until October 2016 when his death was announced at the age of 22.

== Pedigree ==
Pedigree of Moscow Flyer, bay gelding, 1994
Sire Moscow Society (USA) 1985	Nijinsky(CAN); 1967	Northern Dancer	Nearctic
Sire Moscow Society (USA) 1985	Nijinsky(CAN); 1967	Northern Dancer	Natalma
Sire Moscow Society (USA) 1985	Nijinsky(CAN); 1967	Flaming Page	Bull Page
Sire Moscow Society (USA) 1985	Nijinsky(CAN); 1967	Flaming Page	Flaring Top
Sire Moscow Society (USA) 1985	Afifa (USA); 1974	Dewan	Bold Ruler
Sire Moscow Society (USA) 1985	Afifa (USA); 1974	Dewan	Sunshine Nell
Sire Moscow Society (USA) 1985	Afifa (USA); 1974	Hooplah	Hillary
Sire Moscow Society (USA) 1985	Afifa (USA); 1974	Hooplah	Beadah
Dam Meelick Lady (IRE) 1988	Duky (IRE); 1974	Midsummer Night	Djeddah
Dam Meelick Lady (IRE) 1988	Duky (IRE); 1974	Midsummer Night	Night Sound
Dam Meelick Lady (IRE) 1988	Duky (IRE); 1974	Frondia	Parthia
Dam Meelick Lady (IRE) 1988	Duky (IRE); 1974	Frondia	French Fern
Dam Meelick Lady (IRE) 1988	Quiet Life (GB); 1972	No Argument	Narrator
Dam Meelick Lady (IRE) 1988	Quiet Life (GB); 1972	No Argument	Persuader
Dam Meelick Lady (IRE) 1988	Quiet Life (GB); 1972	Brambling	Foroughi
Dam Meelick Lady (IRE) 1988	Quiet Life (GB); 1972	Brambling	Hedge Law (Family 5)
