= Channor Real Estate Group Novice Hurdle =

Hurdle horse race in Ireland

- Class: Grade 1
- Location: Punchestown; County Kildare, Ireland
- Race type: Hurdle race
- Sponsor: Channor Real Estate Group
- Website: Punchestown

Race information
- Distance: 3 miles (4,828 metres)
- Surface: Turf
- Track: Right-handed
- Qualification: Four-years-old and up
- Weight: 11 st 0 lb (4yo); 11 st 11lb (5yo); 11 st 12lb (6yo+); Allowances; 7 lb for fillies and mares
- Purse: €125,000 (2024); 1st: €59,000

Channor Real Estate Group Novice Hurdle
2026
Le Frimeur	Zanoosh	I Started A Joke

Previous years
2025
Jasmin De Vaux	Honesty Policy	Fleur In The Park
2024
Dancing City	High Class Hero	Better Days Ahead
2023
Gaelic Warrior	Affordale Fury	Franciscan Rock
2022
The Nice Guy	Minella Cocooner	Meet And Greet
2021
Galopin Des Champs	Gentlemansgame	Stattler

2020-2011
2019
Minella Indo	Allaho	Carefully Selected
2018
Next Destination	Delta Work	Kilbricken Storm
2017
Champagne Classic	Penhill	Tin Soldier
2016
Bellshill	Coney Island	Sandymount Duke
2015
Killultagh Vic	Thistlecrack	Shaneshill
2014
Beat That	Don Poli	Lots Of Memories
2013
Morning Assembly	Inish Island	Ballycasey
2012
Marasonnien	Vesper Bell	Sous Les Cieux
2011
Askanna	Mossey Joe	Battle Group

2010-2004
2010
Rigour Back Bob	Arabella Boy	Magnanimity
2009
The Midnight Club	Sam Adams	Healys Bar
2008
Got Attitude	Home Hunter	Shakervilz
2007
Casey Jones	Emma Jane	Treacle
2006
Sir Overbury	Chelsea Harbour	Keaveney
2005
Bright Gas	Orchestral Dream	Lost Time
2004
G V A Ireland	Deep Return	Burnt Out

The Channor Real Estate Group Novice Hurdle is a Grade 1 National Hunt hurdle race in Ireland which is open to horses aged four years or older. It is run at Punchestown over a distance of about 3 miles (4,828 metres), and during its running there are fourteen hurdles to be jumped. The race is for novice hurdlers, and it is scheduled to take place each year during the Punchestown Festival in late April or early May.

The race rose rapidly in status, firstly to Grade 3 in 2009, to Grade 2 the following year and finally to Grade 1 in 2011.

== Records ==
Leading jockey (8 wins):

- Paul Townend - Marasonnien (2012), Killultagh Vic (2015), Next Destination (2018), Galopin Des Champs (2021), The Nice Guy (2022), Gaelic Warrior (2023), Dancing City (2024), Jasmin De Vaux (2025)

Leading trainer (10 wins):

- Willie Mullins - The Midnight Club (2009), Marasonnien (2012), Killultagh Vic (2015), Bellshill (2016), Next Destination (2018), Galopin Des Champs (2021), The Nice Guy (2022), Gaelic Warrior (2023), Dancing City (2024), Jasmin De Vaux (2025)

== Winners since 2005 ==
Year	Winner	Jockey	Trainer
2004	G V A Ireland	Francis J Flood	Francis Flood
2005	Bright Gas	Barry Geraghty	R P Burns
2006	Sir Overbury	Robbie Power	D O'Connell
2007	Casey Jones	Paul Carberry	Noel Meade
2008	Got Attitude	Barry Geraghty	Jessica Harrington
2009	The Midnight Club	Emmet Mullins	Willie Mullins
2010	Rigour Back Bob	Barry Geraghty	Edward O'Grady
2011	Askanna	Barry O'Neill (Note: amateur rider)	Colin Bowe
2012	Marasonnien	Paul Townend	Willie Mullins
2013	Morning Assembly	Davy Condon	Pat Fahy
2014	Beat That	Barry Geraghty	Nicky Henderson
2015	Killultagh Vic	Paul Townend	Willie Mullins
2016	Bellshill	Ruby Walsh	Willie Mullins
2017	Champagne Classic	Bryan Cooper	Gordon Elliott
2018	Next Destination	Paul Townend	Willie Mullins
2019	Minella Indo	Rachael Blackmore	Henry de Bromhead
	no race 2020 (Note: The 2020 running was cancelled because of the COVID-19 pandemic in the Republic of Ireland)
2021	Galopin Des Champs	Paul Townend	Willie Mullins
2022	The Nice Guy	Paul Townend	Willie Mullins
2023	Gaelic Warrior	Paul Townend	Willie Mullins
2024	Dancing City	Paul Townend	Willie Mullins
2025	Jasmin De Vaux	Paul Townend	Willie Mullins
2026	Le Frimeur	JJ Slevin	Harry Derham

== See also ==
- Horse racing in Ireland
- List of Irish National Hunt races
