= Kicking King =

Irish-bred Thoroughbred racehorse (1998–2023)

- Racing silks of Conor Clarkson
- Sire: Old Vic
- Dam: Fairy Blaze
- Damsire: Good Thyne
- Sex: Gelding
- Foaled: 10 April 1998
- Died: 21 March 2023 (aged 25)
- Country: Ireland
- Colour: Bay
- Breeder: Sunnyhill Stud
- Owner: Conor Clarkson
- Trainer: Tom Taaffe
- Record: 28: 12-8-3
- Earnings: £818,032

Major wins
- Byrne Group Novice Hurdle (2003); Gowran Park Champion Chase (2004); Arkle Perpetual Challenge Cup (2004); John Durkan Memorial Chase (2004); King George VI Chase (2004, 2005); Cheltenham Gold Cup (2005); Punchestown Gold Cup (2005); Timeform rating: 182

Kicking King (10 April 1998 – 21 March 2023) was a National Hunt racehorse trained in Straffan, County Kildare, Ireland, by Tom Taaffe. He is best known for completing the King George VI Chase-Cheltenham Gold Cup double in the 2004/05 National Hunt season. He was ridden in all his races over jumps by Barry Geraghty.

Kicking King won a bumper at Leopardstown on his first appearance on a racecourse in January 2002. The following season he won three times over hurdles in Ireland before making his first appearance in Britain at the 2003 Cheltenham Festival, where he ran second to the favourite, Back In Front, in the Grade 1 Supreme Novices' Hurdle.

In the 2003/04 season the five-year-old was introduced to novice chasing. After coming fifth and falling in his first two attempts, he won a novice chase at Punchestown and then secured his first Grade 1 win in the Arkle Novice Chase at Leopardstown. At the 2004 Cheltenham Festival he again came second, this time to Well Chief in the Arkle Challenge Trophy.

The 2004/05 season was Kicking King's most successful, with four Grade 1 wins. He started his campaign with a win in the Grade 2 Gowran Park Champion Chase and was then beaten into second place by favourite Beef Or Salmon in the JNwine.com Champion Chase at Down Royal. His next race was the John Durkan Memorial Chase at Punchestown, where he beat the odds-on favourite Beef Or Salmon into third place. On Boxing Day 2004, Kicking King started as favourite in the King George VI Chase at Kempton Park. He had a comfortable lead at the last when a bad mistake nearly unseated his jockey but he still won by two-and-a-half lengths. There was added drama on the run-in when a spectator dressed as Santa ran across the course and narrowly avoided a collision with Kicking King. Kicking King then went on to win the Gold Cup at the 2005 Cheltenham Festival, followed by the Punchestown Gold Cup.

Kicking King won his second King George VI Chase on 26 December 2005, when the race was held at Sandown while Kempton Park Racecourse was being refurbished. After the race he was found to have sustained a tendon injury which kept him out of racing for the rest of the season and the following season. He returned to the racecourse in January 2008, finishing a close second to Nickname in the Normans Grove Chase. He was subsequently sent off favourite for the Red Mills Chase in February and finished third. He went on to contest the Punchestown Gold Cup but was pulled up.

Kicking King reappeared for the 2008/09 season in the Grade 2 Gowran Park Champion Chase and fell in the race eventually won by Knight Legend. He made another appearance in a chase at Punchestown, where he was 2nd of 4 runners behind War Of Attrition. It was his last race; his retirement was announced in November 2008. "I think he was a great ambassador for racing and for ourselves," his trainer said, adding that it was great that he had retired in one piece. Kicking King went to spend his retirement with the living legends at the Irish National Stud in County Kildare. Over his career Kicking King amassed more than £800,000 in prize money and had six Grade One wins to his name.

Kicking King died on 21 March 2023, at the age of 25.

== Pedigree ==
Pedigree of Kicking King (IRE), bay gelding, 1998
Sire Old Vic 1986	Sadler's Wells; 1981	Northern Dancer (CAN)	Nearctic (CAN)
Sire Old Vic 1986	Sadler's Wells; 1981	Northern Dancer (CAN)	Natalma (USA)
Sire Old Vic 1986	Sadler's Wells; 1981	Fairy Bridge (USA)	Bold Reason (USA)
Sire Old Vic 1986	Sadler's Wells; 1981	Fairy Bridge (USA)	Special (USA)
Sire Old Vic 1986	Cockade; 1973	Derring-Do	Darius II
Sire Old Vic 1986	Cockade; 1973	Derring-Do	Sipsey Bridge
Sire Old Vic 1986	Cockade; 1973	Camenae	Vimy
Sire Old Vic 1986	Cockade; 1973	Camenae	Madrilen
Dam Fairy Blaze 1991	Good Tyne; 1977	Herbager	Vandala
Dam Fairy Blaze 1991	Good Tyne; 1977	Herbager	Flagette
Dam Fairy Blaze 1991	Good Tyne; 1977	Foreseer	Round Table (USA)
Dam Fairy Blaze 1991	Good Tyne; 1977	Foreseer	Regal Gleam (USA)
Dam Fairy Blaze 1991	Fairy Tree; 1970	Varano	Darius II
Dam Fairy Blaze 1991	Fairy Tree; 1970	Varano	Varna II
Dam Fairy Blaze 1991	Fairy Tree; 1970	Precision Time	Arctic Time
Dam Fairy Blaze 1991	Fairy Tree; 1970	Precision Time	Preciousogan

- Kicking King is 4x4 inbred to Darius II
