= Spa Novices' Hurdle =

Hurdle horse race in Britain

Spa Novices' Hurdle (Albert Bartlett Novices' Hurdle)
- Class: Grade 1
- Location: Cheltenham Racecourse; Cheltenham, England
- Inaugurated: 2005
- Race type: Hurdle race
- Sponsor: Albert Bartlett
- Website: Cheltenham

Race information
- Distance: 2m 7f 213y (4,822 metres)
- Surface: Turf
- Track: Left-handed
- Qualification: Five-years-old and up
- Weight: 11 st 7 lb Allowances; 7 lb for fillies and mares
- Purse: £150,000 (2025); 1st: £84,405

Spa Novices' Hurdle
2026
Johnny's Jury	Fruit De Mer	The Passing Wife

Previous years
2025
Jasmin De Vaux	The Big Westerner	Derryhassen Paddy
2024
Stellar Story	The Jukebox Man	Dancing City
2023
Stay Away Fay	Affordale Fury	Sandor Clegane
2022
The Nice Guy	Minella Cocooner	Bardenstown Lad
2021
Vanillier	Oscar Elite	Streets Of Doyen

2020-2011
2020
Monkfish	Latest Exhibition	Fury Road
2019
Minella Indo	Commander Of Fleet	Allaho
2018
Kilbricken Storm	Ok Corral	Santini
2017
Penhill	Monalee	Wholestone
2016
Unowhatimeanharry	Fagan	Champers on Ice
2015
Martello Tower	Milsean	No More Heroes
2014
Very Wood	Deputy Dan	Apache Jack
2013
At Fishers Cross	African Gold	Inish Island
2012
Brindisi Breeze	Boston Bob	Grand Vision
2011
Bobs Worth	Mossley	Court in Motion

2010-2005
2010
Berties Dream	Najaf	Kennel Hill
2009
Weapon's Amnesty	Pride of Dulcote	The Midnight Club
2008
Nenuphar Collonges	Liskennett	The Tother One
2007
Wichita Lineman	Air Force One	Itsa Legend
2006
Black Jack Ketchum	Powerstation	Travino
2005
Moulin Riche	Over The Creek	Brewster

The Spa Novices' Hurdle, known for sponsorship purposes as the Albert Bartlett Novices' Hurdle, is a Grade 1 National Hunt hurdle race in Great Britain which is open to horses aged five years or older. It is run on the New Course at Cheltenham over a distance of about 3 miles (2 miles 7 furlongs and 213 yards, or 4,822 metres), and during its running there are twelve hurdles to be jumped. The race is for novice hurdlers, and it is scheduled to take place each year during the Cheltenham Festival in March.

It was one of several new races introduced at the Festival when a fourth day was added to the meeting in 2005. For its first three runnings the event was sponsored by Brit Insurance, and it was classed at Grade 2 level. The vegetable growing company Albert Bartlett began supporting the race in 2008, and since then it has held Grade 1 status. The race was originally open to horses aged four years or older, but since 2023 four year olds have been excluded.

== Records ==
Leading jockey (3 wins):

- Tony McCoy – Black Jack Ketchum (2006), Wichita Lineman (2007) At Fishers Cross (2013)
- Paul Townend - Penhill (2017), Monkfish (2020), Jasmin De Vaux (2025)

Leading trainer (4 wins):

- Willie Mullins – Penhill (2017), Monkfish (2020), The Nice Guy (2022), Jasmin De Vaux (2025)

== Winners ==
Year	Winner	Age	Jockey	Trainer
2005	Moulin Riche	5	Robert Thornton	François Doumen
2006	Black Jack Ketchum	7	Tony McCoy	Jonjo O'Neill
2007	Wichita Lineman	6	Tony McCoy	Jonjo O'Neill
2008	Nenuphar Collonges	7	Robert Thornton	Alan King
2009	Weapon's Amnesty	6	Davy Russell	Charles Byrnes
2010	Berties Dream	7	Andrew Lynch	Paul John Gilligan
2011	Bobs Worth	6	Barry Geraghty	Nicky Henderson
2012	Brindisi Breeze	6	Campbell Gillies	Lucinda Russell
2013	At Fishers Cross	6	Tony McCoy	Rebecca Curtis
2014	Very Wood	5	Paul Carberry	Noel Meade
2015	Martello Tower	7	Adrian Heskin	Margaret Mullins
2016	Unowhatimeanharry	8	Noel Fehily	Harry Fry
2017	Penhill	6	Paul Townend	Willie Mullins
2018	Kilbricken Storm	7	Harry Cobden	Colin Tizzard
2019	Minella Indo	6	Rachael Blackmore	Henry de Bromhead
2020	Monkfish	6	Paul Townend	Willie Mullins
2021	Vanillier	6	Mark Walsh	Gavin Cromwell
2022	The Nice Guy	7	Sean O'Keeffe	Willie Mullins
2023	Stay Away Fay	6	Harry Cobden	Paul Nicholls
2024	Stellar Story	7	Sam Ewing	Gordon Elliott
2025	Jasmin De Vaux	6	Paul Townend	Willie Mullins
2026	Johnny's Jury	6	Gavin Sheehan	Jamie Snowden

== See also ==
- Horse racing in Great Britain
- List of British National Hunt races
