= The Irish Road To Cheltenham =

- Country of origin: Ireland
- No. of seasons: 1
- No. of episodes: 5

Production
- Running time: 30 minutes

Original release
- Network: RTÉ One
- Release: 7 March 2013

The Irish Road To Cheltenham was a five-part observational documentary series following five National Hunt Jockeys throughout the 2012/13 National Hunt season and in their ultimate objective, to compete at the Cheltenham Festival in March 2013.

The documentary gave access into their lives and a glimpse of the physical and mental lengths they go through both on and off the race track. The first episode aired on 7 March 2013 on RTÉ 1.

== Jockeys featured ==
- Davy Russell
- Nina Carberry
- Andrew Lynch
- Andrew McNamara
- Robert Power
