= Barberstown Castle Novice Chase =

Steeplechase horse race in Ireland

- Class: Grade 1
- Location: Punchestown; County Kildare, Ireland
- Race type: Steeplechase
- Sponsor: Barberstown Castle
- Website: Punchestown

Race information
- Distance: 2 miles (3,219 metres)
- Surface: Turf
- Track: Right-handed
- Qualification: Five-years-old and up
- Weight: 11 st 12 lb Allowances; 7 lb for mares
- Purse: €125,000 (2022); 1st: €73,850

Ryanair Novice Chase
2026
Salvator Mundi	Irish Panther	Jacob's Ladder

Previous years
2025
Majborough	Only By Night	Jesse Evans
2024
Il Etait Temps	Gaelic Warrior	Hercule Du Seuil
2023
El Fabiolo	Dysart Dynamo	Indiana Jones
2022
Blue Lord	Coeur Sublime	Gabynako
2021
Energumene	Janidil	Zarkareva

2020-2011
2019
Chacun Pour Soi	Defi Du Seuil	Duc Des Genievres
2018
Footpad	Optimus Prime	Asthuria
2017
Great Field	Ordinary World	Ball D'arc
2016
Douvan	The Game Changer	Sizing John
2015
Un De Sceaux	Just Cameron	Ted Veale
2014
God's Own	Moscow Mannon	Balder Succes
2013
Arvika Ligeonniere	Oscars Well	Special Tiara
2012
Lucky William	Blackstairmountain	First Lieutenant
2011
Captain Chris	Realt Dubh	Saludos

2010-2003
2010
Captain Cee Bee	Let Yourself Go	Sports Line
2009
Barker	Forpadydeplasterer	Made In Taipan
2008
Big Zeb	Thyne Again	J'y Vole
2007
Another Promise	Royal Shakespeare	Carthalawn
2006
Accordion Etoile	Justified	In Compliance
2005
War Of Attrition	Watson Lake	Strike Back
2004
Say Again	Commonchero	Emperors Guest
2003
Le Roi Miguel	Impek	Rathgar Beau

The Barberstown Castle Novice Chase is a Grade 1 National Hunt Steeplechase in Ireland which is open to horses aged five years or older. It is run at Punchestown over a distance of about 2 miles (3,219 metres), and during its running there are eleven fences to be jumped. The race is for novice chasers, and it is scheduled to take place each year during the Punchestown Festival in late April or early May.

During the 1990s the event was sponsored by the Bank of Ireland and Tripleprint. It was promoted to Grade 1 status in 1998, and its sponsorship was taken over by Swordlestown Stud in 2000. Ryanair sponsored the race from 2010 to 2021 and the present sponsor, Barberstown Castle, began supporting the race in 2022.

The field usually includes horses which ran previously in the Arkle Challenge Trophy at Cheltenham, and the last to win both races was El Fabiolo in 2023.

== Records ==
Leading jockey since 1992 (4 wins):

- Barry Geraghty – Moscow Flyer (2002), Big Zeb (2008), Lucky William (2012), God's Own (2014)
- Ruby Walsh - Le Roi Miguel (2003), Arvika Ligeonniere (2013), Un De Sceaux (2015), Douvan (2016)

Leading trainer since 1992 (13 wins):

- Willie Mullins - Barker (2009), Arvika Ligeonniere (2013), Un de Sceaux (2015), Douvan (2016), Great Field (2017), Footpad (2018), Chacun Pour Soi (2019), Energumene (2021), Blue Lord (2022), El Fabiolo (2023), Il Etait Temps (2024), Majborough (2025), Salvator Mundi (2026)

== Winners since 1992 ==
Year	Winner	Age	Jockey	Trainer
1992	Classical Charm	9	Ken Morgan	Al O'Connell
1993	Viking Flagship	6	Richard Dunwoody	David Nicholson
1994	Oh So Grumpy	6	Jamie Osborne	Jessica Harrington
1995	Strong Platinum	7	Conor O'Dwyer	Paddy Burke
1996	Ventana Canyon	7	Richard Dunwoody	Edward O'Grady
1997	Jeffell	7	Francis Woods	Arthur Moore
1998	Direct Route	7	Paul Carberry	Howard Johnson
1999	Sydney Twothousand	9	Norman Williamson	Noel Meade
2000	Tiutchev	7	Mick Fitzgerald	Nicky Henderson
2001	Alcapone (Note: The 2001 running took place at Fairyhouse)	7	David Casey	Mouse Morris
2002	Moscow Flyer	8	Barry Geraghty	Jessica Harrington
2003	Le Roi Miguel	5	Ruby Walsh	Paul Nicholls
2004	Say Again	8	John Cullen	Paul Nolan
2005	War of Attrition	6	Conor O'Dwyer	Mouse Morris
2006	Accordion Etoile	7	John Cullen	Paul Nolan
2007	Another Promise	8	Graham Lee	Ferdy Murphy
2008	Big Zeb	7	Barry Geraghty	Colm Murphy
2009	Barker	8	David Casey	Willie Mullins
2010	Captain Cee Bee	9	Tony McCoy	Eddie Harty
2011	Captain Chris	7	Richard Johnson	Philip Hobbs
2012	Lucky William	8	Barry Geraghty	Thomas Cooper
2013	Arvika Ligeonniere	8	Ruby Walsh	Willie Mullins
2014	God's Own	6	Barry Geraghty	Tom George
2015	Un de Sceaux	7	Ruby Walsh	Willie Mullins
2016	Douvan	6	Ruby Walsh	Willie Mullins
2017	Great Field	6	Jody McGarvey	Willie Mullins
2018	Footpad	6	Daryl Jacob	Willie Mullins
2019	Chacun Pour Soi	7	Robbie Power	Willie Mullins
	no race 2020 (Note: The 2020 running was cancelled because of the COVID-19 pandemic in the Republic of Ireland)
2021	Energumene	7	Paul Townend	Willie Mullins
2022	Blue Lord	7	Paul Townend	Willie Mullins
2023	El Fabiolo	6	Paul Townend	Willie Mullins
2024	Il Etait Temps	6	Danny Mullins	Willie Mullins
2025	Majborough	5	Mark Walsh	Willie Mullins
2026	Salvator Mundi	6	Harry Cobden	Willie Mullins

== See also ==
- Horse racing in Ireland
- List of Irish National Hunt races
