= Punchestown Racecourse =

Horse racing venue in the Republic of Ireland

Coordinates: 53.184°N 6.63°W

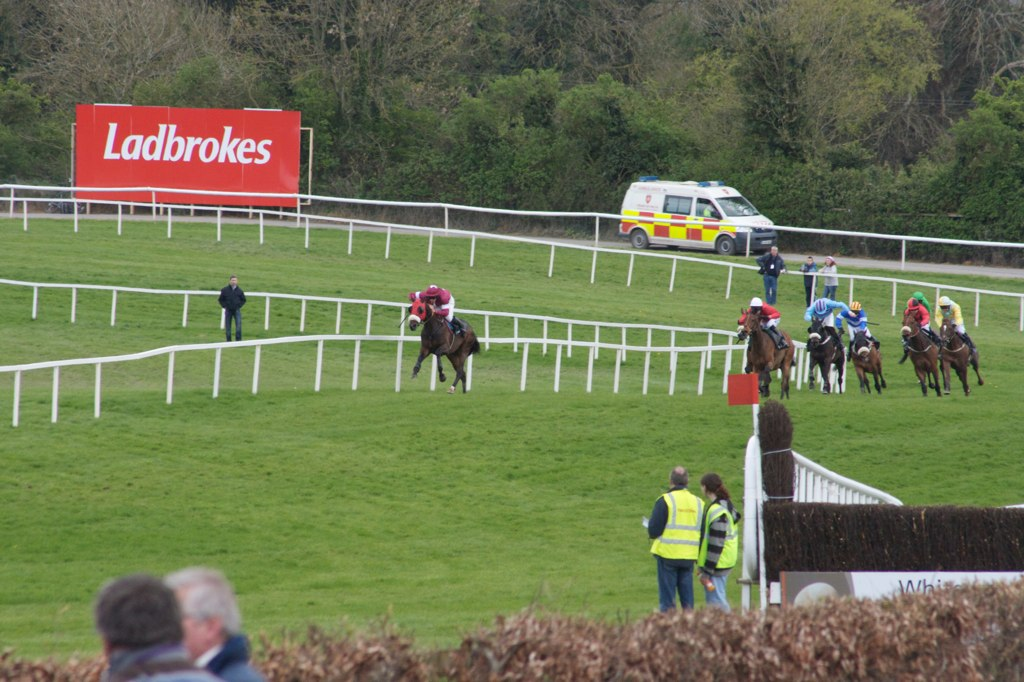
- Punchestown races 2009
- Interactive map of Punchestown Racecourse
- Location: County Kildare, Ireland
- Date opened: 1875
- Course type: National Hunt
- Notable races: Boylesports.com Champion Chase; Punchestown Gold Cup; Ladbrokes.com World Series Hurdle; Rabobank Champion Hurdle; AES Champion 4YO Hurdle

Punchestown Racecourse is located in the parish of Eadestown, between the R410 and R411 regional roads near Naas, County Kildare, in Ireland. It is known as the home of Irish Jumps Racing and plays host to the annual Punchestown Irish National Hunt Festival. The racecourse itself is right-handed with an undulating hurdle and steeplechase track. The hurdle course is one mile six furlongs in distance while the chase course is 2 miles. Punchestown Racecourse also has the only cross country banks course in Ireland.

As well as horse racing, Punchestown has hosted several music events, including the annual Oxegen festival which ran from 2004 to 2011 and then again in 2013, while AC/DC, Bon Jovi and Eminem are among the artists to have played sold-out concerts on the racecourse. In 1982 Rory Gallagher played to over 16,000 people supported by U2, Phil Lynott, and Simple Minds. this was part of Hot Press fifth Anniversary. Just north of the racecourse is a Bronze Age, 23 foot tall, nine ton tapered standing stone known as the Longstone at Punchestown. Dick O'Sullivan has been General Manager since 2003.

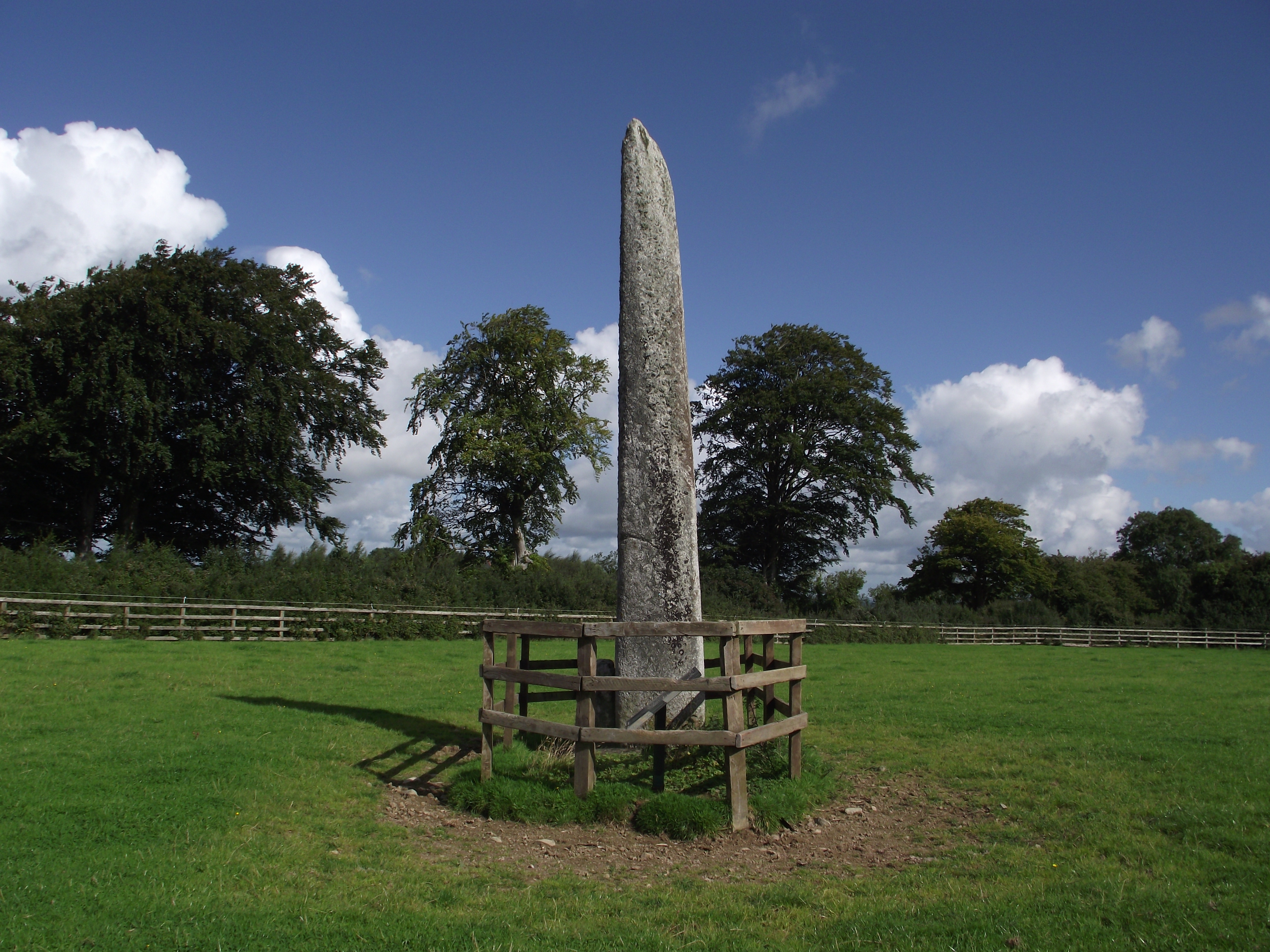
Punchestown Great Standing Stone, Ireland

== Punchestown Festival ==
The Punchestown Festival is the major horse racing festival of the Irish National Hunt Season and is usually held annually in April. The Punchestown Festival is held over five days, between Tuesday and Saturday inclusive. It is seen by many as the Irish version of the Cheltenham Festival and is run in a very similar format.

The major races at the Festival are the Champion Chase, Ryanair Novice Chase, Champion Hurdle, World Series Hurdle, Herald Champion Novice Hurdle, Tattersalls Ireland Champion Novice Hurdle, Growise Champion Novice Chase, Champion Four Year Old Hurdle, Champion INH Flat Race and the Punchestown Gold Cup.

Punchestown is also the home of Ireland's best known International Three Day Event. Run under the title of "Punchestown International Three Day Event and Horse Show," the annual event incorporates a CCI*** Three Day Event, National Showjumping and Showing as well as a Young Event Horse Class. Punchestown hosted the European Eventing Championships in 1991 and 2003. The 2008 event was cancelled at an early stage due to problems with the ground.

== History ==
Punchestown Races were reorganised and reconstituted as "Kildare and National Hunt Steeplechases" in 1861. By the mid-1860s, when fences and hurdles were first introduced, attendance had grown to some 40,000. The presence of the then Prince of Wales, Albert Edward, in 1868 further bolstered the crowds, with an estimated 5,000 travelling by train from Dublin alone.

== Notable races ==
Month	DOW	Race Name	Type	Grade	Distance	Age/Sex
January	Saturday	Moscow Flyer Novice Hurdle	Hurdle	Grade 2	2m	5yo +
February	Sunday	Tied Cottage Chase	Chase	Grade 2	2m	5yo +
April	Tuesday	Dooley Insurance Group Champion Novice Chase	Chase	Grade 1	3m 1f	5yo +
April	Tuesday	William Hill Champion Chase	Chase	Grade 1	2m ½f	5yo +
April	Tuesday	PRL Champion Novice Hurdle	Hurdle	Grade 1	2m ½f	5yo +
April	Wednesday	Punchestown Gold Cup	Chase	Grade 1	3m 1f	5yo +
April	Wednesday	Champion INH Flat Race	N H Flat	Grade 1	2m ½f	4yo-6yo
April	Wednesday	Channor Real Estate Group Novice Hurdle	Hurdle	Grade 1	3m	4yo +
April	Thursday	Champion Stayers Hurdle	Hurdle	Grade 1	2m 7½f	4yo +
April	Thursday	Barberstown Castle Novice Chase	Chase	Grade 1	2m ½f	5yo +
April	Friday	Punchestown Champion Hurdle	Hurdle	Grade 1	2m	4yo +
April	Friday	Alanna Homes Champion Novice Hurdle	Hurdle	Grade 1	2m 4½f	4yo +
April	Saturday	Champion Four Year Old Hurdle	Hurdle	Grade 1	2m	4yo only
May	Saturday	Mares Champion Hurdle	Hurdle	Grade 1	2m 2f	4yo + m
October	Thursday	Buck House Novice Chase	Chase	Grade 3	2m 2f	4yo +
October	Thursday	Grabel Mares Hurdle	Hurdle	Grade 3	2m 2f	4yo + m
October	Thursday	Daily Star Chase	Chase	Grade 3	2m 7f	5yo +
November	Sunday	Craddockstown Novice Chase	Chase	Grade 2	2m	4yo +
November	Sunday	Morgiana Hurdle	Hurdle	Grade 1	2m	4yo +
November	Sunday	Florida Pearl Novice Chase	Chase	Grade 2	2m 6f	5yo +
December	Sunday	John Durkan Memorial Punchestown Chase	Chase	Grade 1	2m 4f	5yo +

== Music events ==
As well as horse racing, Punchestown is a noted venue for its music festivals. These include Creamfields - held in 2000, 2001 and 2002; the Ozzfest - a few times; Witnness - held in 2003 (from 2000 to 2002, Witnness was at Fairyhouse Racecourse); and the annual Oxegen festival which was held there from 2004 to 2011 and then again in 2013 before being cancelled. Maximum capacity for concerts is usually 80,000 people.

Radiohead also played a concert at the Punchestown Racecourse, dubbing it "Live From A Tent In Dublin".

Eminem played two dates there in 2003, selling out both. They included his first ever Irish concert on 26 June 2003. He did not return to Ireland again until 2010 when he topped the bill at Oxegen 2010, also held at Punchestown Racecourse.

American rock band Bon Jovi played there on Saturday 7 June 2008.

Australian rock band AC/DC played there on 28 June 2009, in front of 69,354 people. The concert was controversial, with long queues, lack of lighting at exits and too few stewards reported, barriers being pushed over and fans, forced into walking 10 kilometres to the concert, later expressing their rage against organisers MCD Productions for failing to ensure roads were clear.

Westlife lead vocalist Shane Filan played at the racecourse as a solo artist in 2017.

== Scouting Jamboree 2008 ==
Punchestown was the site of Jamboree 2008, Scouting Ireland's first national Scout Jamboree from 2–10 August 2008. Bad weather forced the cancellation of visitors' day, with those who were to come being ordered to stay away. Thousands of people from around the world attempted to break a world hand-shaking record.
