= Tom Taaffe =

Irish racehorse trainer

Tom Taaffe (b. 15 June 1963) is a former Irish racehorse trainer who was based at Portree Stables, Boston, Ardclough, Straffan, in County Kildare. He trained the 2005 Cheltenham Gold Cup winning horse Kicking King, who also won the Boxing Day King George VI Chase in 2004 and 2005.

== Life and career ==
He began training in the 1994/95 jumps season, having had a successful career as a professional jump jockey for the Arthur Moore stable, havin ridden over 400 winners, topped by winning the Irish Grand National on Brittany Boy in 1987.

The son of jockey and trainer, Pat Taaffe, who famously rode Arkle to a Cheltenham Gold Cup treble in the 1960s and trained 1974 Gold Cup winner Captain Christy, he emulated his father's success by training Kicking King to win the same race in 2005. The horse also had back to back wins for Taaffe in the Boxing Day King George VI Chase in 2004 and 2005, ridden by Barry Geraghty. Taaffe also trained Ninetieth Minute, who won the Coral Cup at the 2009 Cheltenham Festival.

Other notable horses trained by him were Emotional Moment, Solar System, Finger Onthe Pulse, Tumbling Dice, Ninetieth Minute (2009 Coral Cup), and Secret Native. Taaffe retired from training after 27 years in 2021, to move on to breeding, sales and other activities within the racing industry as an international client relations consultant.
