= Andrew Lynch (jockey) =

Irish jockey

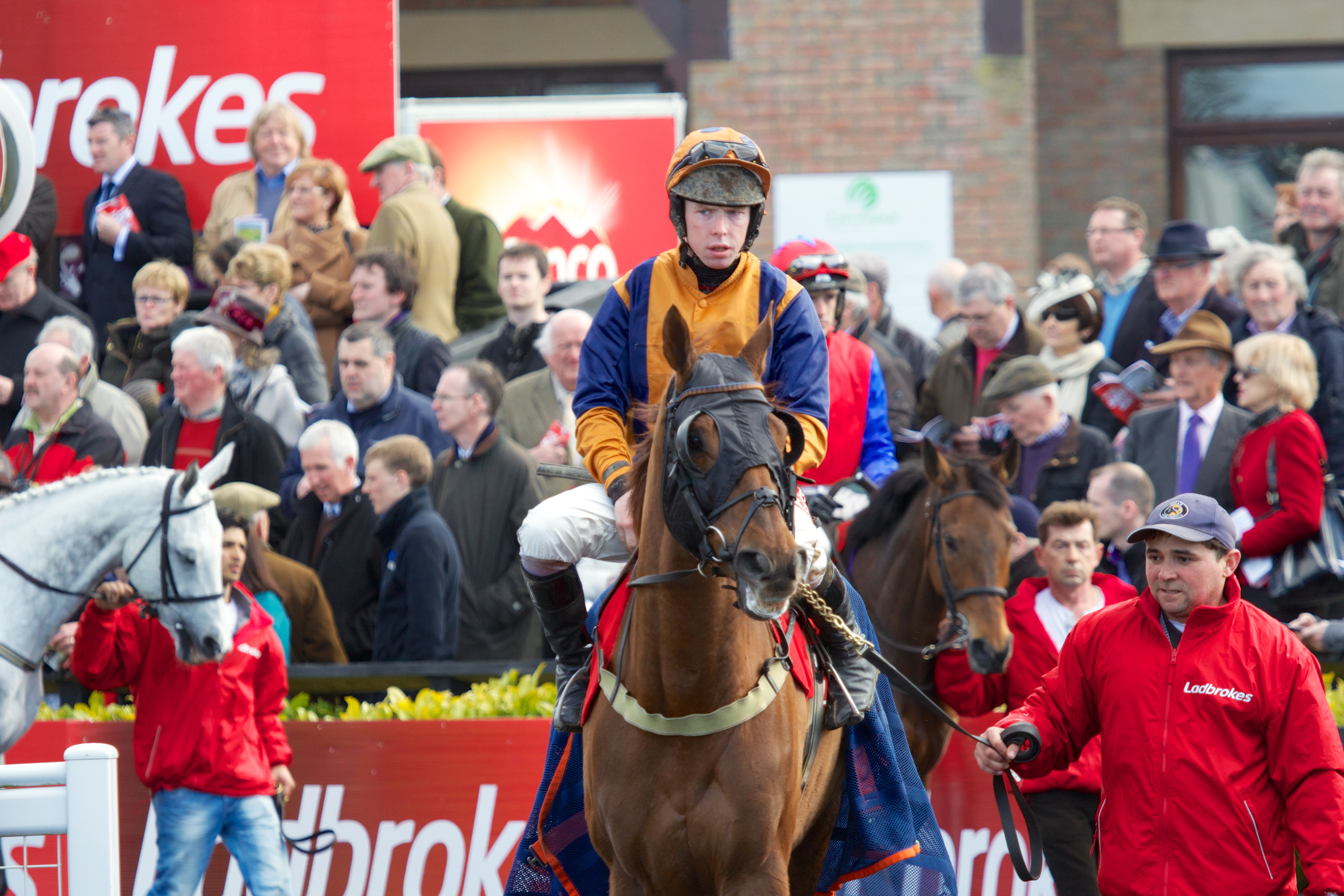
- Andrew Lynch riding Whatuthink in 2013

Personal information
- Born: 1988 (age 37–38) County Meath Ireland
- Occupation: Jockey

Horse racing career
- Sport: Horse racing

Significant horses
- Sizing Europe

Andrew Lynch is a retired Irish National Hunt jockey. Lynch had his first ride in a bumper at Fairyhouse in April 2001 and his first winning ride in May 2002 on Tristernagh in a novice hurdle at Downpatrick. Lynch won 2 races in the Cheltenham Festival in 2010 and 2011. His 2 Cheltenham Festival wins in 2010 were on Sizing Europe and Berties Dream in the Arkle Challenge Trophy and Albert Bartlett Novices' Hurdle and respectively while his 2011 wins were on Sizing Europe and Sizing Australia in the Queen Mother Champion Chase and Cross Country Chase respectively. In May 2012 Lynch broke his leg after a fall at Cork.

== TV ==
In 2013 he appeared on documentary The Irish Road To Cheltenham which was shown on RTÉ One television in Ireland.

== Major wins ==
(Republic of Ireland) Ireland

- Punchestown Gold Cup -(1) Notre Pere (2009)
- Punchestown Champion Chase -(2) Sizing Europe (2012,2014)
- Ryanair Gold Cup -(2) Jadanli (2010), Flemenstar (2012)
- Hatton's Grace Hurdle -(1) Voler la Vedette (2011)
- John Durkan Memorial Punchestown Chase -(2) Rubi Light (2011), Flemenstar (2012)
- Racing Post Novice Chase -(1) Sizing Europe (2009)
- Paddy's Reward Club "Sugar Paddy" Chase -(2) Sizing Europe (2012), Flemenstar (2015)
- Paddy Power Future Champions Novice Hurdle -(2) De Valira (2006), Cash And Go (2011)
- Christmas Hurdle -(1) Voler la Vedette (2011)
- Fort Leney Novice Chase -(1) Notre Pere (2007)
- Arkle Novice Chase -(1) Flemenstar (2012)
- Spring Juvenile Hurdle -(1) Hisaabaat (2012)
- Champion Four Year Old Hurdle -(1) Hisaabaat (2012)

(United Kingdom) Great Britain

- Queen Mother Champion Chase -(1) Sizing Europe (2011)
- Arkle Challenge Trophy -(1) Sizing Europe (2010)
- Tingle Creek Chase -(1) Sizing Europe (2011)
- Spa Novices' Hurdle -(1) Berties Dream (2010)
