= Jessica Harrington =

Irish horse trainer

Jessica Jane Harrington (née Fowler, born 12 February 1947) is an Irish professional horse trainer. Harrington specialises in National Hunt racing but has also had success in flat racing.

== Personal life ==
Harrington was born in London. Her father was Brigadier Bryan Fowler, an officer in the British Army, and her mother was Mary Walford. Bryan Fowler was originally from Kells, County Meath and served with the Royal Artillery in both World Wars, and married Mary, who was a widow, in 1944. She had two children from her previous marriage. Harrington had an older brother, John Fowler, who was also a racehorse trainer and died in an accident in 2008 at their family estate in Summerhill, County Meath. Bryan Fowler left the army in 1949 and returned with his family to Ireland where Harrington spent her childhood. She did not go to school until she was aged twelve, being tutored. She then went to school at Hatherop in England for four years before going to a finishing school in France.

Harrington was married to David Lloyd at the age of 21; their marriage ended in 1976 and they had two children, James and Tara. Harrington later married bloodstock agent Johnny Harrington and remained married to him until his death from cancer in April 2014. Together the couple had two daughters, Emma and Kate. As well, Jessica and Johnny had three sons-in-law, a daughter-in-law and seven grandchildren.

== Professional life ==
Before Harrington got her training permit in 1989, she had earned a reputation for being one of Ireland's top three-day event riders. She represented her country at European Championship and World Championship level and was a reserve at the 1984 Summer Olympic Games. In 1994, Harrington's horse Oh So Grumpy earned himself (and indirectly Harrington) a “landmark success” at the Galway Hurdle. A couple of years later Dance Beat picked up Leopardstown's Ladbroke Handicap Hurdle. By 1996 Harrington had earned a reputation for being linked to high-profile horses. She then went on to enjoy seven Cheltenham Festival victories, rendering her "one of the most successful current Irish trainers at the meeting." Her most notable horses include: Moscow Flyer, Curtain Call, Bible Belt, Pathfork and Laughing Lashes. On 17 March 2017 she won the Cheltenham Gold Cup with Sizing John and the following month won the Irish Grand National at Fairyhouse racecourse. It was a first win, in both races, for both Harrington and rider Robbie Power.

== Major wins ==
(Republic of Ireland) Ireland

- Arkle Novice Chase - (2) Bust Out (2003), Ulaan Baatar (2005)
- Champion Stayers Hurdle - (2) Jetson (2014), Jezki (2015)
- Chanelle Pharma Novice Hurdle - (1) Oscars Well (2011)
- Dr P. J. Moriarty Novice Chase - (2) Carrigeen Victor (2005), Bostons Angel (2011)
- December Festival Hurdle - (2) Moscow Flyer (2000), Macs Joy (2004)
- Fort Leney Novice Chase - (2) Bostons Angel (2010), Our Duke (2016)
- Golden Cygnet Novice Hurdle - (2) Roberto Goldback (2009), Coole River (2010)
- Greenmount Park Novice Chase - (1) Intelligent (2002)
- Hatton's Grace Hurdle - (1) Jezki (2013)
- Herald Champion Novice Hurdle - (4) Dance Beat (1996), Moscow Flyer (2000), Jezki (2013), Don't Touch It (2016)
- Irish Champion Hurdle - (2) Macs Joy (2005), Supasundae (2018)
- Irish Champion Stakes - (1) Hotazhell (2026)
- Irish Daily Mirror Novice Hurdle - (1) Got Attitude (2008)
- Irish Gold Cup - (1) Sizing John (2017)
- Irish 1,000 Guineas – (1) Alpha Centauri (2018)
- Irish Oaks - (1) Magical Lagoon (2022)
- John Durkan Memorial Punchestown Chase - (1) Sizing John (2017)
- Matron Stakes – (1) No Speak Alexander (2021)
- Morgiana Hurdle - (1) Moscow Flyer (2000)
- Moyglare Stud Stakes - (1) - Discoveries (2021)
- Paddy Power Future Champions Novice Hurdle - (1) Jezki (2012)
- Paddy's Reward Club Chase - (2) Moscow Flyer (2002, 2003)
- Phoenix Stakes – (1) Lucky Vega (2020)
- Punchestown Champion Chase - (1) Moscow Flyer (2004)
- Punchestown Champion Hurdle - (4) Moscow Flyer (2001), Macs Joy (2006), Jezki (2014), Supasundae (2018)
- Punchestown Gold Cup - (1) Sizing John (2017)
- National Stakes - (1) Pathfork (2010)
- Racing Post Novice Chase - (1) Moscow Flyer (2001)
- Royal Bond Novice Hurdle - (3) Moscow Flyer (1999), Hide the Evidence (2006), Jezki (2012)
- Ryanair Novice Chase - (2) Oh So Grumpy (1994), Moscow Flyer (2002)
- Spring Juvenile Hurdle - (1) Personal Column (2008)

(United Kingdom) Great Britain

- Aintree Hurdle - (1) Supasundae (2019)
- Arkle Challenge Trophy - (1) Moscow Flyer (2002)
- Champion Bumper - (1) Cork All Star (2007)
- Champion Hurdle - (1) Jezki (2014)
- Cheltenham Gold Cup - (1) Sizing John (2017)
- Cheveley Park Stakes - (1) Millisle (2019)
- Coronation Stakes - (2) Alpha Centauri (2018), Alpine Star (2020)
- Falmouth Stakes - (1) Alpha Centauri (2018)
- Fighting Fifth Hurdle - (1) Space Trucker (1996)
- RSA Insurance Novices' Chase - (1) Bostons Angel (2011)
- Futurity Trophy - (1) Hotazhell (2024)
- Melling Chase - (2) - Moscow Flyer (2004, 2005)
- Queen Mother Champion Chase - (2) Moscow Flyer (2003, 2005)
- Tingle Creek Chase -(2) Moscow Flyer (2003, 2004)

France

- Prix Jacques Le Marois - (1) Alpha Centauri (2018)
- Prix Marcel Boussac - (1) Albigna (2019)
- Prix de l'Opéra - (1) Barnavara (2025)

Germany

- Bayerisches Zuchtrennen – (1) – Hotazhell (2026)
