= Barry Geraghty =

Irish jockey

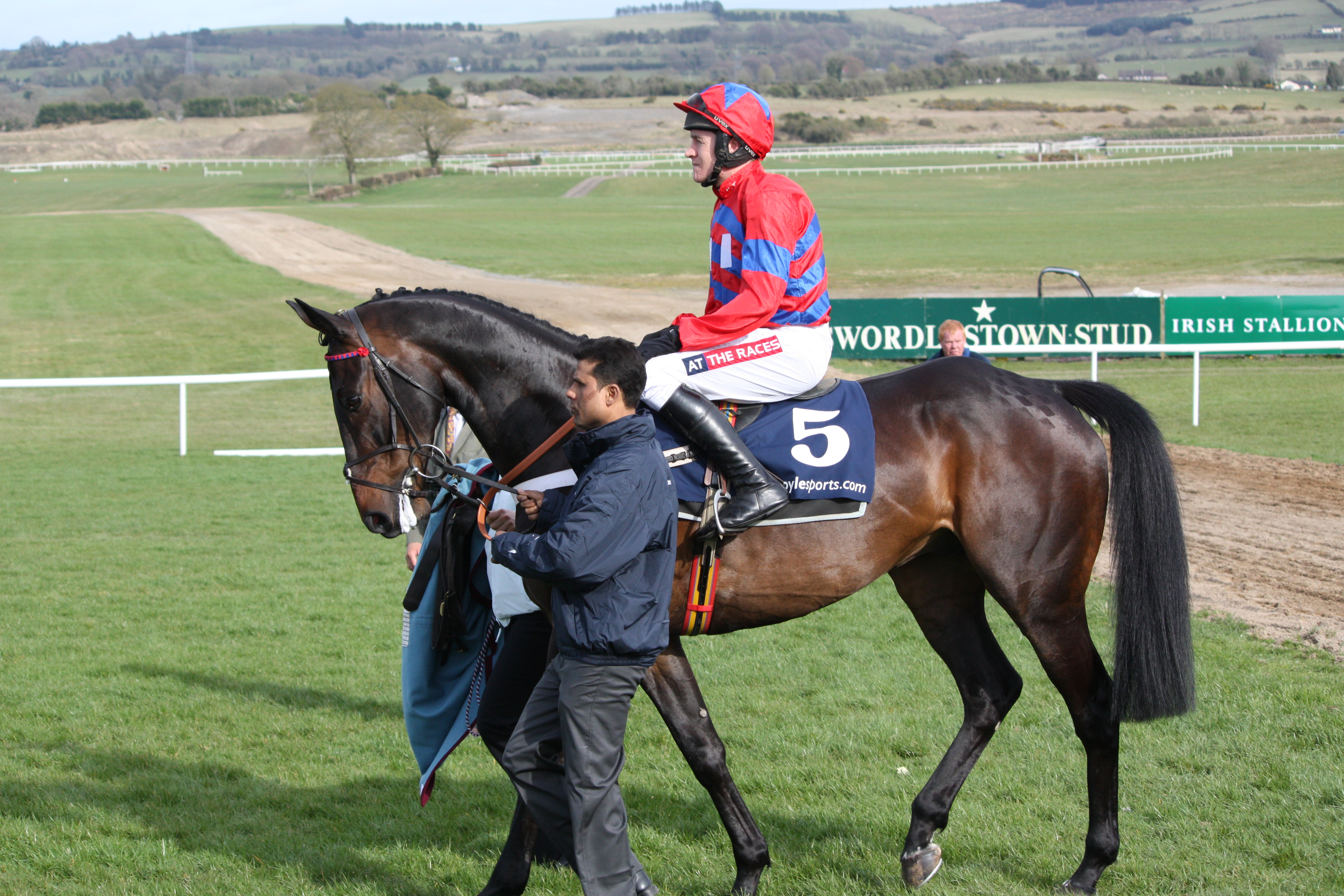
- Barry Geraghty & Sprinter Sacre at Punchestown in 2013

Personal information
- Born: 16 September 1979 (age 46) Pelletstown, County Meath, Ireland
- Occupation: Jockey

Horse racing career
- Sport: Horse racing
- Career wins: 1920

Honours
- Irish jump racing Champion Jockey 1999/00, 2003/04

Significant horses
- Moscow Flyer, Kicking King, Bobs Worth, Sprinter Sacre

Barry Geraghty (born 16 September 1979) is a retired Irish jockey. He is the second most successful jockey of all time at the Cheltenham Festival.

Geraghty rode his first winner in January 1997 and three years later he became the Irish Champion jump jockey for the first time. His first win in England was the 1998 Midlands Grand National at Uttoxeter on Miss Orchestra for trainer Jessica Harrington. He rode his first Cheltenham winner on the Jessica Harrington-trained Moscow Flyer in the 2002 Arkle Chase.

He won the Grand National in 2003 on Monty's Pass. Also that year he won five races at the Cheltenham Festival, including the Queen Mother Champion Chase on Moscow Flyer, and was voted Irish sports personality of the year. In the 2003–04 season he became Champion Irish jump jockey for the second time and won the Stayers' Hurdle at Cheltenham on the Jonjo O'Neill-trained Iris's Gift. Geraghty and Moscow Flyer won their second Champion Chase at the 2005 Cheltenham Festival, and Geraghty also won the Cheltenham Gold Cup on Kicking King for trainer Tom Taaffe at that meeting. Following the retirement of Mick Fitzgerald he became first jockey to the Nicky Henderson stable in 2008.

In 2009 he won the Champion Hurdle on Punjabi, the Arkle Challenge Trophy on Forpadydeplasterer and Triumph Hurdle on Zaynar. In winning the Champion Hurdle he became the first jockey to have won the big four races at cheltenham (Champion Hurdle, Champion Chase, Stayers Hurdle, Gold Cup) and The Aintree Grand National. On 2 November 2009 he rode his 1000th winner under National Hunt Rules in the UK and Ireland when the Henderson-trained Duc De Regniere won at Kempton. He won his fifth Champion Chase at the 2013 Cheltenham Festival on Sprinter Sacre. He has had at least one winner at each Cheltenham festival since his first victory in 2002 except for the 2017 Cheltenham festival. At the 2020 Cheltenham Festival he had five wins for owner J. P. McManus. This included a record-equalling four wins in the Champion Hurdle.

On 28 August 2012 he recorded his 1000th Irish winner after a treble at Cork Racecourse. On 26 January 2019 he rode his 1,875th winner in Britain and Ireland, moving him up to fourth on the all-time winners list.

In July 2020, Geraghty announced his retirement. At retirement, he was the fourth most successful British and Irish jump jockey with 1920 winners.

== Cheltenham Festival winners (43) ==
Cheltenham Festival winners (43)
| Year | Race | Mount |
|---|---|---|
| 2002 | Arkle Challenge Trophy | Moscow Flyer |
| 2003 | William Hill Trophy | Youlneverwalkalone |
| 2003 | Pertemps Final | Inching Closer |
| 2003 | Queen Mother Champion Chase | Moscow Flyer |
| 2003 | Triumph Hurdle | Spectroscope |
| 2003 | County Hurdle | Spirit Leader |
| 2004 | Stayers Hurdle | Iris's Gift |
| 2005 | Queen Mother Champion Chase | Moscow Flyer |
| 2005 | Cheltenham Gold Cup | Kicking King |
| 2006 | Royal & SunAlliance Chase | Star De Mohaison |
| 2006 | Coral Cup | Skys The Limit |
| 2007 | Champion Bumper | Cork All Star |
| 2008 | Jewsons Novices' Handicap Chase | Finger on The Pulse |
| 2009 | Arkle Challenge Trophy | Forpadydeplasterer |
| 2009 | Champion Hurdle | Punjabi |
| 2009 | Triumph Hurdle | Zaynar |
| 2010 | Queen Mother Champion Chase | Big Zeb |
| 2010 | Coral Cup | Spirit River |
| 2010 | Triumph Hurdle | Soldatino |
| 2011 | Albert Bartlett Novices' Hurdle | Bobs Worth |
| 2012 | Arkle Challenge Trophy | Sprinter Sacre |
| 2012 | Neptune Investment Management Novices' Hurdle | Simonsig |
| 2012 | RSA Chase | Bobs Worth |
| 2012 | Queen Mother Champion Chase | Finian's Rainbow |
| 2012 | Ryanair Chase | Riverside Theatre |
| 2013 | Arkle Challenge Trophy | Simonsig |
| 2013 | Queen Mother Champion Chase | Sprinter Sacre |
| 2013 | Cheltenham Gold Cup | Bobs Worth |
| 2014 | Champion Hurdle | Jezki |
| 2014 | RSA Chase | O'Faolians Boy |
| 2014 | World Hurdle (Note: From 2005 to 2016 this race was known as the World Hurdle. Before 2005 and after 2016 this race was known as the Stayers Hurdle.) | More Of That |
| 2015 | Ultima Business Solutions Handicap Chase | The Druids Nephew |
| 2015 | Triumph Hurdle | Peace and Co |
| 2016 | Triumph Hurdle | Ivanovich Gorbatov |
| 2018 | Champion Hurdle | Buveur d'Air |
| 2018 | Grand Annual Chase | Le Prezien |
| 2019 | JLT Novices Chase | Defi De Seuil |
| 2019 | Pertemps Final | Sire De Berlais |
| 2020 | Champion Hurdle | Epatante |
| 2020 | RSA Chase | Champ |
| 2020 | Coral Cup | Dame De Compagnie |
| 2020 | Pertemps Final | Sire De Berlais |
| 2020 | County Handicap Hurdle | Saint Roi |

== Major wins ==
(Republic of Ireland) Ireland

- Alanna Homes Champion Novice Hurdle -(1) Jer's Girl (2016)
- Arkle Novice Chase -(2) Bust Out (2003), Kicking King (2004)
- Champion Four Year Old Hurdle -(1) Grandouet (2011)
- Chanelle Pharma Novice Hurdle -(1) Bleu Et Rouge (2016)
- Christmas Hurdle -(2) Sacundai (2003), Emotional Moment (2004)
- Dr P. J. Moriarty Novice Chase -(1) Pizzaro (2004)
- Drinmore Novice Chase -(2) Alexander Banquet (1999), Le Coudray (2003)
- Golden Cygnet Novice Hurdle -(3) Kazal (2007), Roberto Goldback (2009), Coole River (2010)
- Hatton's Grace Hurdle -(1) Limestone Lad (2002)
- Herald Champion Novice Hurdle -(4) Moscow Flyer (2000), Clopf (2007), Jezki (2013), Don't Touch It (2016)
- Irish Daily Mirror Novice Hurdle -(4) Bright Gas (2005), Got Attitude (2008), Rigour Back Bob (2010), Beat That (2014)
- Irish Gold Cup -(1) Alexander Banquet (2002)
- John Durkan Memorial Punchestown Chase -(2) Kicking King (2004), In Compliance (2006)
- Mares Novice Hurdle Championship Final -(2) Shirley Casper (2009), Jer's Girl (2016)
- Morgiana Hurdle -(2) Cockney Lad (1997), Back In Front (2003)
- Neville Hotels Novice Chase -(1) Pizarro (2003)
- Punchestown Champion Chase -(2) Moscow Flyer (2004), Big Zeb (2011)
- Punchestown Champion Hurdle -(3) Moscow Flyer (2001), Macs Joy (2006), Punjabi (2008)
- Punchestown Gold Cup -(5) Moscow Express (2001), Florida Pearl (2002), Kicking King (2005), China Rock (2012), Carlingford Lough (2016)
- Racing Post Novice Chase -(2) Moscow Flyer (2001), Le Coudray (2002)
- Royal Bond Novice Hurdle -(1) Moscow Flyer (1999)
- Ryanair Gold Cup -(2) Rebel Fitz (2014), Kylemore Lough (2016)
- Ryanair Hurdle -(3) Moscow Flyer (2000), Liss A Paoraigh (2002),
- Ryanair Novice Chase -(4) Moscow Flyer (2002), Big Zeb (2008), Lucky William (2012), God's Own (2014)
- Savills Chase -(1) Bobs Worth (2013)
- Slaney Novice Hurdle -(2) Canary Wharf (2002), Kazal (2007)
- Spring Juvenile Hurdle -(3) Personal Column (2008), Guitar Pete (2014), A Wave of the Sea (2020)

(United Kingdom) Great Britain

- Aintree Hurdle -(3) Oscar Whisky (2011, 2012), Buveur d'Air (2017)
- Arkle Challenge Trophy -(4) Moscow Flyer (2002), Forpadydeplasterer (2009), Sprinter Sacre (2012), Simonsig (2013)
- Ascot Chase -(3) Monet's Garden (2010), Riverside Theatre (2011, 2012)
- Ballymore Novices' Hurdle -(1) Simonsig (2012)
- Betway Bowl -(1) Florida Pearl (2002)
- Celebration Chase -(2) Cenkos (2002, 2004)
- Challow Novices' Hurdle -(2) Champ (2019)
- Champion Bumper -(1) Cork All Star (2007)
- Champion Hurdle -(4) Punjabi (2009), Jezki (2014), Buveur d'Air (2018), Epatante (2020)
- Cheltenham Gold Cup -(2) Kicking King (2005), Bobs Worth (2013)
- Christmas Hurdle -(3) Yanworth (2016), Buveur d'Air (2017), Epatante (2019)
- Clarence House Chase -(2) Sprinter Sacre (2013), Defi Du Seuil (2020)
- Coral Cup - (3) Sky's The Limit (2006), Spirit River (2010), Dame De Compagnie (2020)
- Fighting Fifth Hurdle -(3) Punjabi (2008), Buveur d'Air (2017, 2018)
- Henry VIII Novices' Chase -(1) Captain Conan (2012)
- JLT Novices' Chase -(1) Defi du Seuil (2019)
- King George VI Chase -(2) Kicking King (2004, 2005)
- Liverpool Hurdle -(2) Iris's Gift (2004), Whisper (2014)
- Long Walk Hurdle -(2) Punchestown (2008), Unowhatimeanharry (2016)
- Maghull Novices' Chase -(2) Finian's Rainbow (2011), Sprinter Sacre (2012)
- Manifesto Novices' Chase -(2) Mad Max (2010), Captain Conan (2013)
- Melling Chase -(4) Moscow Flyer (2004, 2005), Finian's Rainbow (2012), Sprinter Sacre (2013)
- Mersey Novices' Hurdle -(2) Spirit Son (2011), Simonsig (2012)
- Mildmay Novices' Chase -(2) Star de Mohaison (2006), Burton Port (2010)
- Queen Mother Champion Chase -(5) Moscow Flyer (2003, 2005), Big Zeb (2010), Finian's Rainbow (2012), Sprinter Sacre (2013)
- RSA Insurance Novices' Chase -(4) Star de Mohaison (2006), Bobs Worth (2012), O'Faolain's Boy (2014), Champ (2020)
- Ryanair Chase -(1) Riverside Theatre (2012)
- Scilly Isles Novices' Chase -(4) Punchestowns (2010), Captain Conan (2013), Oscar Whisky (2014), Defi Du Seuil (2019)
- Sefton Novices' Hurdle -(3) Sackville (2000), Iris's Gift (2003), Beat That (2014)
- Albert Bartlett Novices' Hurdle -(1) Bobs Worth (2011)
- Stayers' Hurdle -(2) Iris's Gift (2004), More Of That (2014)
- Tingle Creek Chase -(4) Moscow Flyer (2003, 2004), Sprinter Sacre (2012), Defi Du Seuil (2019)
- Tolworth Hurdle -(3) Minella Class (2011), Captain Conan (2012), L'ami Serge (2015)
- Top Novices' Hurdle -(2) General Miller (2010), Josses Hill (2014)
- Triumph Hurdle -(5) Spectroscope (2003), Zaynar (2009), Soldatino (2010), Peace And Co (2015), Ivanovich Gorbatov (2016)

== Grand National Record ==
Geraghty rode in every Grand National from 2000 until 2014, winning once and being placed on four other occasions. He missed the 2015 Grand National owing to a hairline fracture in his left tibia.

Grand National
| Year | Mount | Finish |
|---|---|---|
| 2000 | Call It a Day | 6th |
| 2001 | Hanakham | Fell |
| 2002 | Alexander Banquet | Unseated rider |
| 2003 | Monty's Pass | 1st |
| 2004 | Monty's Pass | 4th |
| 2005 | Monty's Pass | 16th |
| 2006 | Puntal | 6th |
| 2007 | Slim Pickings | 3rd |
| 2008 | Slim Pickings | 4th |
| 2009 | Golden Flight | Fell |
| 2010 | Big Fella Thanks | 4th |
| 2011 | Or Noir De Somoza | Fell |
| 2012 | Shakalakaboomboom | 9th |
| 2013 | Roberto Goldback | Unseated rider |
| 2014 | Triolo D'alene | Pulled up |
| 2016 | Shutthefrontdoor | 9th |
| 2017 | More Of That | Pulled up |
| 2018 | Anibale Fly | 4th |

== See also ==
- List of jockeys
