= Rule the World (horse) =

British-bred Thoroughbred racehorse

- Racing silks of Gigginstown House Stud
- Sire: Sulamani
- Grandsire: Hernando
- Dam: Elaine Tully
- Damsire: Persian Bold
- Sex: Gelding
- Foaled: 30 March 2007
- Country: United Kingdom
- Colour: Bay
- Breeder: Mrs P. G. Wilkins and Mr D. Vallely
- Owner: Gigginstown House Stud
- Trainer: Mouse Morris
- Record: 25: 6-10-1
- Earnings: £763,005

Major wins
- Slaney Novice Hurdle (2013); Limestone Lad Hurdle (2014); Grand National (2016)

Rule the World (foaled 30 March 2007) is a British-bred, Irish-trained thoroughbred racehorse who won the Grand National as a novice in 2016. He showed good form as a staying hurdler, winning the Slaney Novice Hurdle in 2013 and the Limestone Lad Hurdle in 2014 before being stepped up to compete in steeplechases. In his first season over fences he failed to win in eight attempts but finished second in five races including the Irish Grand National. In the 2015/16 season he recorded two seconds and a third in his first five races before posting his first steeplechase win in the Grand National on 9 April 2016.

== Background ==
Rule The World is a bay gelding, bred in the United Kingdom by Mrs P. G. Wilkins and R. J. McAlpine. He was sired by Sulamani, a top-class international turf horse whose wins included the Prix du Jockey Club, Dubai Sheema Classic, Arlington Million, Juddmonte International Stakes and Canadian International Stakes. The best of his progeny included Mastery and Honeysuckle. Rule The World's dam Elaine Tully showed useful form as a racemare, winning three times on the flat and four times over hurdles. She was a great-granddaughter of the broodmare Helvetie, whose other descendants have included The Derby winner Erhaab.

As a three-year-old gelding, Rule The World was consigned to the Tattersalls Ireland National Hunt sale in June 2010 and was bought for €90,000 by Mouse Morris. During his racing career, Rule The World was owned by Ryanair executive Michael O'Leary, and trained by Morris at Fethard in County Tipperary.

== Racing career ==
=== Early career ===
Rule The World began his racing career on the amateur point-to-point circuit, winning at Affane as a four-year-old in November 2011. In the following season he was campaigned in novice hurdle times and won three races including the Slaney Novice Hurdle at Naas Racecourse in which he defeated Champagne Fever. After the race Morris described the winner as "a nice horse" but also as "a big, raw bugger". In March 2013 he was sent to England for the Cheltenham Festival and finished second to The New One in the Baring Bingham Novices' Hurdle.

In the 2013/2014 season Rule The World was campaigned against more experienced hurdlers and began his season by winning over two and a half miles at Naas. He finished fourth to Jezki in the Hatton's Grace Hurdle and second in the Christmas Hurdle at Leopardstown Racecourse. He was then dropped to Grade 3 class for the Limestone Lad Hurdle at Naas in January and won by seven and a half length from Jennies Jewel after leading from the start. Morris described the victory as "a very pleasing performance on bottomless ground which wasn't ideal and making the running which wasn't ideal either". He appeared for the second time at the Cheltenham Festival in March 2014 and finished sixth in the World Hurdle.

=== Steeplechasing ===
Rule The World competed in novice chases in the 2014/2015 National Hunt season. He failed to win but showed consistently good form, finishing second in several races including the Woodlands Park 100 Club Novice Chase, the Kilcock Novice Chase and the Hugh McMahon Memorial Novice Chase. In the spring of 2015 he was matched against more experienced opponents in the Irish Grand National and finished second of the twenty-eight starters, four lengths behind the winner Thunder and Roses. On his final appearance of the season he contested the Galway Plate in July and appeared to be traveling well when he slipped and fell approaching the final fence.

In the 2015/2016 season, Rule The World was still a novice chaser despite his high class-form. He began his campaign by finishing third in the Kerry National at Listowel Racecourse and then finished second when favourite for the Like A Butterfly Novice Chase. He was runner-up to No More Heroes (also owned by O'Leary) in the Fort Leney Novice Chase at Leopardstown in December and went on to take fifth place in the Thyestes Chase. On 6 March he made a second attempt to win the Kilcock Novice Chase but finished fourth behind Sub Lieutenant, another O'Leary-owned horse. Up to that point he had been considered a contender for one of the long distance chases at the Cheltenham Festival, but his disappointing performance led to him bypassing the meeting.

On 9 April 2016 Rule The World started a 33/1 outsider for the Grand National in a field which included Many Clouds, Silviniaco Conti, Sir Des Champs, Shutthefrontdoor and 34 others. Ridden by the 19 year old David Mullins he tracked the leaders for most of the way and survived a mistake at the fourth last fence before moving up into contention on the final turn. He jumped the last in third place and then began a sustained run on the outside. He took the lead at the elbow and drew away in the closing stages to win by six lengths from The Last Samuri, with another eight lengths back to Vics Canvas in third. He was the first novice to win the Grand National since 1958, when Mr. What won the race.

Trainer Morris said, after the win: "It's Disneyland – fairytale stuff. ... He's fractured his pelvis twice. Before that I always thought he was the best horse I ever had, how good would he be with a proper rear end on him?" On the day after his win at Aintree O'Leary suggested that Rule The World might be retired from racing. He said "This horse could have been Gold Cup standard but for the injuries he has suffered. He’s nine now and after that we could retire him – I wouldn't want to bring him back here again, and Mouse will have to decide how he comes out of this race, but if he never runs again who cares?" Rule the World's retirement was confirmed in May 2016.

== Pedigree ==
Pedigree of Rule The World (GB), bay gelding, 2007
Sire Sulamani (IRE) 1999	Hernando (FR); 1990	Niniski	Nijinsky
Sire Sulamani (IRE) 1999	Hernando (FR); 1990	Niniski	Virginia Hills
Sire Sulamani (IRE) 1999	Hernando (FR); 1990	Whakilyric	Miswaki
Sire Sulamani (IRE) 1999	Hernando (FR); 1990	Whakilyric	Lyrism
Sire Sulamani (IRE) 1999	Soul Dream (USA); 1990	Alleged	Hoist the Flag
Sire Sulamani (IRE) 1999	Soul Dream (USA); 1990	Alleged	Princess Pout
Sire Sulamani (IRE) 1999	Soul Dream (USA); 1990	Normia	Northfields
Sire Sulamani (IRE) 1999	Soul Dream (USA); 1990	Normia	Mia Pola
Dam Elaine Tully (IRE) 1988	Persian Bold (IRE); 1975	Bold Lad (IRE)	Bold Ruler
Dam Elaine Tully (IRE) 1988	Persian Bold (IRE); 1975	Bold Lad (IRE)	Barn Pride
Dam Elaine Tully (IRE) 1988	Persian Bold (IRE); 1975	Relkarunner	Relko
Dam Elaine Tully (IRE) 1988	Persian Bold (IRE); 1975	Relkarunner	Running Blue
Dam Elaine Tully (IRE) 1988	Hanna Alta; 1979	Busted	Crepello
Dam Elaine Tully (IRE) 1988	Hanna Alta; 1979	Busted	Sans le Sou
Dam Elaine Tully (IRE) 1988	Hanna Alta; 1979	Hamada	Habitat
Dam Elaine Tully (IRE) 1988	Hanna Alta; 1979	Hamada	Helvetie (Family 1-w)
