= List of Irish National Hunt races =

A list of notable National Hunt horse races which take place annually in Ireland, under the authority of Horse Racing Ireland, including all races which currently hold Grade 1, 2, 3 or Listed status, with distances shown in miles and furlongs (rounded to the nearest half-furlong). Horses' names which are in italics are the winners of that race in the previous season.

== Grade 1 ==
| Month | Race Name | Type | Racecourse | Distance | Age | 2026-27 Winner |
|---|---|---|---|---|---|---|
| October | BetVictor Champion Chase | Chase | Down Royal | 3m | 5yo+ | Haiti Couleurs |
| November | Morgiana Hurdle | Hurdle | Punchestown | 2m ½f | 4yo+ | Lossiemouth |
| November | John Durkan Memorial Punchestown Chase | Chase | Punchestown | 2m 4f | 5yo+ | Final Demand |
| November | Drinmore Novice Chase | Chase | Fairyhouse | 2m 4f | 4yo+ |
| November | Hatton's Grace Hurdle | Hurdle | Fairyhouse | 2m 4f | 4yo+ |
| December | Racing Post Novice Chase | Chase | Leopardstown | 2m 1f | 4yo+ |
| December | Faugheen Novice Chase | Chase | Limerick | 2m 3½f | 4yo+ |
| December | Paddy's Reward Club Chase | Chase | Leopardstown | 2m 1f | 5yo+ |
| December | Future Champions Novice Hurdle | Hurdle | Leopardstown | 2m | 4yo+ |
| December | Christmas Hurdle | Hurdle | Leopardstown | 2m 7½f | 4yo+ |
| December | Savills Chase | Chase | Leopardstown | 3m ½f | 5yo+ |
| December | December Hurdle | Hurdle | Leopardstown | 2m | 4yo+ |
| January | Ballymore Novice Hurdle | Hurdle | Naas | 2m 4f | 5yo+ |
| February | Nathaniel Lacy & Partners Solicitors Novice Hurdle | Hurdle | Leopardstown | 2m 6f | 5yo+ |
| February | Spring Juvenile Hurdle | Hurdle | Leopardstown | 2m | 4yo |
| February | Arkle Novice Chase | Chase | Leopardstown | 2m 1f | 5yo+ |
| February | Irish Gold Cup | Chase | Leopardstown | 3m ½f | 5yo+ |
| February | Dr P. J. Moriarty Novice Chase | Chase | Leopardstown | 2m 5½f | 5yo+ |
| February | Tattersalls Ireland Novice Hurdle | Hurdle | Leopardstown | 2m | 5yo+ |
| February | Irish Champion Hurdle | Hurdle | Leopardstown | 2m | 4yo+ |
| February | Dublin Chase | Chase | Leopardstown | 2m 1f | 5yo+ |
| April | Honeysuckle Mares Novice Hurdle | Hurdle | Fairyhouse | 2m 4f | 4yo+ m |
| April | WillowWarm Gold Cup | Chase | Fairyhouse | 2m 4f | 5yo+ |
| April | PRL Champion Novice Hurdle | Hurdle | Punchestown | 2m ½f | 5yo+ |
| April | Dooley Insurance Group Champion Novice Chase | Chase | Punchestown | 3m 1f | 5yo+ |
| April | William Hill Champion Chase | Chase | Punchestown | 2m ½f | 5yo+ |
| April | Channor Real Estate Group Novice Hurdle | Hurdle | Punchestown | 3m | 4yo+ |
| April | Champion INH Flat Race | Flat | Punchestown | 2m ½f | 4–6yo |
| April | Punchestown Gold Cup | Chase | Punchestown | 3m 1f | 5yo+ |
| April | Barberstown Castle Novice Chase | Chase | Punchestown | 2m ½f | 5yo+ |
| April | Champion Stayers Hurdle | Hurdle | Punchestown | 2m 7½f | 4yo+ |
| May | Alanna Homes Champion Novice Hurdle | Hurdle | Punchestown | 2m 4½f | 4yo+ |
| May | Punchestown Champion Hurdle | Hurdle | Punchestown | 2m | 4yo+ |
| May | Mares Champion Hurdle | Hurdle | Punchestown | 2m 4½f | 4yo+ m |
| May | Champion Four Year Old Hurdle | Hurdle | Punchestown | 2m | 4yo |

== Grade 2 ==
| Month | Race Name | Type | Racecourse | Distance | Age | 2026-27 Winner |
|---|---|---|---|---|---|---|
| October | PWC Danoli Chase | Chase | Gowran Park | 2m 4f | 5yo+ | Fleur In The Park |
| October | Racing Post Chase | Chase | Down Royal | 2m 3½f | 4yo+ | Kala Conti |
| November | Clonmel Oil Chase | Chase | Clonmel | 2m 5f | 4yo+ | Kappa Jy Pyke |
| November | Lismullen Hurdle | Hurdle | Navan | 2m 4f | 4yo+ | Feet Of A Dancer |
| November | Fortria Chase | Chase | Navan | 2m | 5yo+ | Found A Fifty |
| November | Florida Pearl Novice Chase | Chase | Punchestown | 3m | 5yo+ | Kiss Will |
| November | Craddockstown Novice Chase | Chase | Punchestown | 2m ½f | 4yo+ | Ocastle Des Mottes |
| November | Royal Bond Novice Hurdle | Hurdle | Fairyhouse | 2m | 4yo+ |
| December | Navan Novice Hurdle | Hurdle | Navan | 2m 4f | 4yo+ |
| December | Coolmore N.H. Sires Luxembourg Irish EBF Mares Novice Chase | Chase | Cork | 2m 1f | 4yo+ m |
| December | Hilly Way Chase | Chase | Cork | 2m 1f | 5yo+ |
| December | Dorans Pride Novice Hurdle | Hurdle | Limerick | 2m 7f | 4yo+ |
| December | O'Driscolls Irish Whiskey Juvenile Hurdle | Hurdle | Leopardstown | 2m | 3yo |
| December | Dawn Run Mares Novice Chase | Chase | Limerick | 2m 6f | 5yo+ m |
| January | Moscow Flyer Novice Hurdle | Hurdle | Punchestown | 2m | 5yo+ |
| January | Coolmore Mares Novice Chase | Chase | Thurles | 2m 4f | 5yo+ m |
| January | Horse & Jockey Hotel Chase | Chase | Thurles | 2m 4½f | 6yo+ |
| January | Galmoy Hurdle | Hurdle | Gowran Park | 3m | 5yo+ |
| February | Donohue Marquees Future Stars I.N.H. Flat Race | Flat | Leopardstown | 2m | 4–6yo |
| February | Coolmore Irish EBF Mares I.N.H. Flat Race | Flat | Leopardstown | 2m | 4–6yo m |
| February | Boyne Hurdle | Hurdle | Navan | 2m 6f | 5yo+ |
| February | Ten Up Novice Chase | Chase | Navan | 3m | 5yo+ |
| February | Red Mills Chase | Chase | Gowran Park | 2m 4f | 5yo+ |
| February | Webster Cup Chase | Chase | Navan | 2m 4½f | 5yo+ |
| April | Donohoe Marquees Novice Hurdle | Hurdle | Fairyhouse | 2m | 4yo+ |
| April | Paddy Kehoe Suspended Ceilings Novice Hurdle | Hurdle | Fairyhouse | 2m 4f | 4yo+ |
| April | O'Driscoll's Irish Whiskey Juvenile Hurdle | Hurdle | Fairyhouse | 2m | 4yo |
| April | Rathbarry & Glenview Studs Hurdle | Hurdle | Fairyhouse | 2m 4f | 5yo+ |
| April | Devenish Chase | Chase | Fairyhouse | 2m 4f | 5yo+ |
| May | Hanlon Concrete Irish EBF Glencarraig Lady Francis Flood Mares Chase | Chase | Punchestown | 2m 4f | 5yo+ m |

== Grade 3 ==
| Month | Race Name | Type | Racecourse | Distance | Age | 2026-27 Winner |
|---|---|---|---|---|---|---|
| May | An Riocht Chase | Chase | Killarney | 2m 4½f | 5yo+ | Senecia |
| July | Grimes Hurdle | Hurdle | Limerick | 2m ½f | 4yo+ | Run For Oscar |
| July | Galway Plate | Chase | Galway | 2m 6½f | 4yo+ | King Alexander |
| July | Guinness Open Gate Brewery Novice Chase | Chase | Galway | 2m 2f | 4yo+ | Shadow Paddy |
| July | Galway Hurdle | Hurdle | Galway | 2m | 4yo+ | Putapoundinthejar |
| September | Kerry National | Chase | Listowel | 3m | 4yo+ | Ballygunner Castle |
| September | Kilbegnet Novice Chase | Chase | Roscommon | 2m ½f | 4yo+ | A Snow White Park |
| October | BOYLE Sports Novice Hurdle | Hurdle | Gowran Park | 2m ½f | 4yo+ | Witches Familiar |
| October | Like A Butterfly Novice Chase | Chase | Gowran Park | 2m 4f | 4yo+ | Frankie John |
| October | Matchbook Betting Exchange Novice Chase | Chase | Punchestown | 2m 2½f | 4yo+ | Chanceawetmorning |
| October | Matchbook Betting Exchange Chase | Chase | Punchestown | 2m 7f | 5yo+ | Gorgeous Tom |
| October | Munster National | Chase | Limerick | 3m | 4yo+ | Kings Hill |
| October | Feathard Lady Mares Novice Hurdle | Hurdle | Down Royal | 2m 1f | 4yo+ m | Ash Hobbs |
| November | Paddy Power Irish EBF Novice Chase | Chase | Cork | 2m 4f | 5yo+ | Love Me Tender |
| November | Barberstown Castle Chase | Chase | Naas | 2m | 4yo+ | Irish Panther |
| November | For Auction Novice Hurdle | Hurdle | Navan | 2m | 4yo+ | Thinkitdontjinxit |
| November | Monksfield Novice Hurdle | Hurdle | Navan | 2m 4f | 4yo+ | With Nolimit |
| November | Troytown Chase | Chase | Navan | 3m | 4yo+ | The Wallpark |
| November | Mullinam Hurdle | Hurdle | Fairyhouse | 2m | 4yo |
| November | BAR 1 Betting Juvenile Hurdle | Hurdle | Fairyhouse | 2m | 3yo |
| December | Joe Buckley Construction Stayers Novice Hurdle | Hurdle | Cork | 3m | 4yo+ |
| December | Leopardstown E.B.F. Mares Hurdle | Hurdle | Leopardstown | 2m 4f | 4yo+ m |
| January | O'Driscoll's Irish Whiskey New Year's Day Chase | Chase | Tramore | 2m 7f | 5yo+ |
| January | John and Chich Fowler Memorial Mares Chase | Chase | Fairyhouse | 2m 4f | 5yo+ m |
| January | Dan & Joan Moore Memorial Handicap Chase | Chase | Fairyhouse | 2m 1½f | 5yo+ |
| January | Killiney Novice Chase | Chase | Punchestown | 2m 3½f | 5yo+ |
| January | Thyestes Chase | Chase | Gowran Park | 3m 1f | 5yo+ |
| January | Limestone Lad Hurdle | Hurdle | Naas | 2m | 5yo+ |
| January | Finlay Ford At Naas Novice Chase | Chase | Naas | 3m ½f | 5yo+ |
| January | Solerina Mares Novice Hurdle | Hurdle | Fairyhouse | 2m 2½f | 4yo+ m |
| February | O'Driscolls Irish Whiskey Leopardstown Handicap Chase | Chase | Leopardstown | 2m 5½f | 5yo+ |
| February | Mercedes-Benz Novice Hurdle | Hurdle | Clonmel | 3m | 4yo+ |
| February | Red Mills Trial Hurdle | Hurdle | Gowran Park | 2m | 4yo+ |
| February | Quevega Mares Hurdle | Hurdle | Punchestown | 2m 4½f | 4yo+ m |
| February | Michael Purcell Novice Hurdle | Hurdle | Thurles | 2m 5f | 5yo+ |
| February | Bobbyjo Chase | Chase | Fairyhouse | 3m 1½f | 5yo+ |
| February | Newlands Chase | Chase | Naas | 2m | 5yo+ |
| February | Flyingbolt Novice Chase | Chase | Navan | 2m | 5yo+ |
| March | Native Upmanship Novice Chase | Chase | Thurles | 2m 5½f | 5yo+ |
| March | Kingsfurze Novice Hurdle | Hurdle | Naas | 2m ½f | 4yo+ |
| March | Limerick E.B.F. Mares Novice Hurdle | Hurdle | Limerick | 2m 7f | 4yo+ m |
| March | Hugh McMahon Memorial Novice Chase | Chase | Limerick | 3m ½f | 5yo+ |
| April | Imperial Call Chase | Chase | Cork | 3m ½f | 5yo+ |
| April | Irish Grand National | Chase | Fairyhouse | 3m 5f | 5yo+ |
| April | Colm Quinn BMW Handicap Chase | Chase | Punchestown | 2m 4½f | 5yo+ |
| April | Weatherbys Ireland EBF Mares Bumper | Flat | Punchestown | 2m ½f | 4–6yo m |

== Listed ==
| Month | Race Name | Type | Racecourse | Distance | Age | 2026-27 Winner |
|---|---|---|---|---|---|---|
| May | MD O'Shea's Tourist Attraction Mares Hurdle | Hurdle | Killarney | 2m 1f | 4yo+ m | Sainte Lucie |
| May | Mayo National | Chase | Ballinrobe | 2m 7½f | 4yo+ | Native Speaker |
| July | Midlands National | Chase | Kilbeggan | 3m 1½f | 5yo+ | Solitary Man |
| July | COLM QUINN BMW Novice Hurdle | Hurdle | Galway | 2m ½f | 4yo+ | Lizzie Twigg |
| August | BOYLE Sports Handicap Hurdle | Hurdle | Galway | 2m 6½f | 4yo+ | Grann's Boy |
| August | Canella Lane Handicap Chase | Chase | Killarney | 2m 5f | 4yo+ | Jalila Moriviere |
| September | Lartigue Handicap Hurdle | Hurdle | Listowel | 2m | 4yo | Game Point |
| September | Ballymore Handicap Hurdle | Hurdle | Listowel | 2m | 5yo+ | Helvic Dream |
| October | Mucklemeg Mares INH Flat Race | Flat | Gowran Park | 2m ½f | 4-6yo m | Sarahs Lawn |
| October | Gowran Park Hurdle | Hurdle | Gowran Park | 2m ½f | 4yo+ | El Cairos |
| October | Cailin Alainn Mares Hurdle | Hurdle | Limerick | 2m 7½f | 4yo+ m | Carried With Love |
| October | Master Chefs Novice Hurdle | Hurdle | Limerick | 2m 5½f | 4yo+ | Tountinna |
| October | Bottlegreen Hurdle | Hurdle | Down Royal | 2m 1f | 4yo+ | Heads Up |
| November | Paddy Power Irish EBF Novice Hurdle | Hurdle | Cork | 3m ½f | 4yo+ | Roc Dino |
| November | Michael Hickey Memorial Chase | Chase | Wexford | 2m 7f | 5yo+ | The Big Westerner |
| November | T.A. Morris Memorial Mares Chase | Chase | Clonmel | 2m 5f | 4yo+ m | A Snow White Park |
| November | Brown Lad Handicap Hurdle | Hurdle | Naas | 2m 4f | 4yo+ | Le Moulin Rouge |
| November | Coolmore N.H. Sires Hurricane Lane Irish EBF Mares Flat Race | Flat | Navan | 2m | 4-6yo m | Brosna Shine |
| November | Grabel Mares Hurdle | Hurdle | Punchestown | 2m 2f | 4yo+ m | Daboya |
| November | Racing TV Club Day Chase | Chase | Thurles | 2m 6f | 5yo+ |
| November | EASYFIX Equine Handicap Chase | Chase | Fairyhouse | 2m 1f | 4yo+ |
| November | Porterstown Handicap Chase | Chase | Fairyhouse | 3m 6f | 4yo+ |
| November | BAR 1 Casino Handicap Hurdle | Hurdle | Fairyhouse | 2m | 4yo+ |
| December | Bective Stud, Tea Rooms & Apartments Handicap Hurdle | Hurdle | Navan | 3m 1f | 4yo+ |
| December | Foxrock Handicap Chase | Chase | Navan | 2m 4½f | 4yo+ |
| December | Matchbook Betting Exchange Mares Novice Hurdle | Hurdle | Punchestown | 2m 3f | 4yo+ m |
| December | Irish Stallion Farms EBF Future Champions Flat Race | Flat | Navan | 2m | 4-6yo |
| December | Billy Harney Memorial Mares Novice Hurdle | Hurdle | Thurles | 2m | 4yo+ m |
| December | Paddy Power Chase | Chase | Leopardstown | 3m | 4yo+ |
| December | Neville Hotels Premier Handicap Hurdle | Hurdle | Leopardstown | 2m 4f | 5yo+ |
| December | Tim Duggan Memorial Handicap Chase | Chase | Limerick | 2m 3½f | 4yo+ |
| December | QuinnBet Handicap Hurdle | Hurdle | Limerick | 2m | 3-4yo |
| February | Race And Stay At Leopardstown Handicap Hurdle | Hurdle | Leopardstown | 3m | 4yo+ |
| February | Barberstown Castle Handicap Chase | Chase | Leopardstown | 2m 1f | 5yo+ |
| February | Paddy Mullins Mares Handicap Hurdle | Hurdle | Leopardstown | 2m 2f | 4yo+ m |
| February | Liffey Handicap Hurdle | Hurdle | Leopardstown | 2m | 4yo+ |
| February | BBA Ireland Limited Opera Hat Mares Chase | Chase | Naas | 2m | 5yo+ m |
| February | Apple's Jade Mares Novice Hurdle | Hurdle | Navan | 2m 4f | 4yo+ m |
| February | Quinn Bet Grand National Trial | Chase | Punchestown | 3m 3f | 5yo+ |
| February | Sheila Bourke Novice Hurdle | Hurdle | Punchestown | 2m | 4yo+ |
| February | Colreevy Mares Novice Chase | Chase | Thurles | 2m 6f | 5yo+ m |
| February | William Hill App Juvenile Hurdle | Hurdle | Naas | 1m 7½f | 4yo |
| February | Nas Na Riogh Novice Chase | Chase | Naas | 2m 4f | 5yo+ |
| March | QuinnBet Handicap Chase | Chase | Leopardstown | 2m 5½f | 5yo+ |
| March | Leinster National | Chase | Naas | 3m 1f | 5yo+ |
| March | Irish Stallion Farms EBF Novice Handicap Chase Final | Chase | Navan | 2m 7½f | 5yo+ |
| March | Kevin McManus Bookmaker Champion (Pro/Am) INH Flat Race | Flat | Limerick | 2m | 4yo |
| April | BOYLE Sports Mares Handicap Chase | Chase | Fairyhouse | 2m 5f | 5yo+ m |
| April | Irish Stallion Farms EBF Novice Handicap Hurdle Final | Hurdle | Fairyhouse | 3m | 5yo+ |
| April | RYBO Handicap Hurdle | Hurdle | Fairyhouse | 2m | 4yo+ |
| April | Irish Stallion Farms EBF Total Enjoyment Mares INH Flat Race | Flat | Fairyhouse | 2m | 4-6yo m |
| April | BOYLE Sports Novice Handicap Chase | Chase | Fairyhouse | 2m ½f | 5yo+ |
| April | Killashee Hotel Handicap Hurdle | Hurdle | Punchestown | 2m ½f | 4yo+ |
| April | Close Brothers Irish EBF Mares Novice Hurdle | Hurdle | Punchestown | 2m ½f | 4yo+ m |
| April | Conway Piling Handicap Hurdle | Hurdle | Punchestown | 2m 7½f | 4yo+ |
| April | Frontline Security Handicap Chase | Chase | Punchestown | 2m ½f | 5yo+ |
| May | QuinnBet Novice Handicap Chase | Chase | Punchestown | 2m 4f | 5yo+ |
| May | Pat Taaffe Handicap Chase | Chase | Punchestown | 3m ½f | 5yo+ |
| May | Lawlor's Of Naas Handicap Hurdle | Hurdle | Punchestown | 2m 4½f | 4yo+ |
