= Ballinfoyle =

Neighbourhood in Galway

Ballinfoyle Baile an Phoill Ballinfoile
- Townland
- Location in Ireland
- Coordinates: 53°17′29″N 9°02′24″W
- Country: Ireland
- Province: Connacht
- County: County Galway
- Time zone: UTC+0 (WET)
  - Summer (DST): UTC-1 (IST (WEST))
- Irish grid reference: M306272

Ballinfoyle (Irish: Baile an Phoill, meaning 'town of the hole'), also sometimes spelled Ballinfoile, is a Roman Catholic parish and townland in Galway city in Ireland.

== History ==
Ballinfoyle was originally part of a large estate belonging to the Blake family in the 18th and 19th centuries. The land was later sold and developed into housing estates in the 1970s and 1980s to accommodate the growing population of Galway. These include Ballinfoile Park, a local authority housing estate. In 2022, An Bord Pleanala refused permission for additional social housing which Galway City Council proposed to build in Ballinfoyle.

== Location and amenities ==
Ballinfoyle is situated in the northwestern part of Galway and is bordered by Castlegar, Ballybrit and Roscam.

The area's community facilities include a primary school, community centre, playground, sports fields, and retail shops.

Ballinfoyle is served by Bus Éireann route 407 to Galway city centre.
