= Winning Fair Juvenile Hurdle =

Hurdle horse race in Ireland

Winning Fair Juvenile Hurdle
2026
Majolique	Michonne	Adrienne

Previous years
2025
Bacchanalian	Kool One	Shoda
2024
Bottler'secret	Pacini	Trustyourinstinct
2023
Zenta	Hypotenus	Jourdefete
2022
Icare Allen	Prairie Dancer	White Pepper
2021
Teahupoo	Tax For Max	Crassus

2020-2011
2020
Burning Victory	Great Bear	Hook Up
2019
Way Back Home	Morosini	Authorizo
2018
Mitchouka	Mastermind	Randalls Ur Poet
2017
Dinaria Des Obeaux	Ex Patriot	Landofhopeandglory
2016
Newberry New	Tocororo	Voix Du Reve
2015
Gwencily Berbas	Lettre de Cachet	Vercingetorix
2014
Abbyssial	Adriana Des Mottes	Gerdago
2013
Stocktons Wing	Dogora	South South West
2012
Burrenbridge Lodge	Minsk	Bat Masterson
2011
Little Green	Chaperoned	Rocky Wednesday

2010-2003
2010
Alaivan	Loch Long	Shanrod
2009
Kyrie Eleison	Chevalier Country	Donegal
2008
Beau Michael	Silverhand	Spiderback
2007
Duty	J'y Vole	Financial Reward
2006
First Row	Bobs Pride	Count Kearney
2005
Majlis	Don't Be Bitin	Loyal Focus
2004
Power Elite	Wild Passion	Zeroberto
2003
Golden Cross	Statim	Harchibald

The Winning Fair Juvenile Hurdle is a Grade 3 National Hunt hurdle race in Ireland. It is run at Fairyhouse in February, over a distance of about 2 miles (2,012 metres) and during the race there are ten hurdles to be jumped. The race was first run as a Grade 3 race in 2003 and awarded Grade 2 status in 2008. It returned to Grade 3 in 2016.

== Records ==
Most successful jockey (3 wins):

- Paul Townend - Little Green (2011), Abbyssial (2014), Zenta (2023)

Most successful trainer (4 wins):

- Willie Mullins - Abbyssial (2014), Burning Victory (2020), Icare Allen (2022), Zenta (2023)

== Winners ==
Year	Winner	Jockey	Trainer
2003	Golden Cross	Charlie Swan	Michael Halford
2004	Power Elite	Paul Carberry	Noel Meade
2005	Majlis	Tom Ryan	Michael O'Brien
2006	First Row	Roger Loughran	Dessie Hughes
2007	Duty	Andrew Lynch	Kevin O'Brien
2008	Beau Michael	Davy Russell	Adrian McGuinness
2009	Kyrie Eleison	Roger Loughran	Dessie Hughes
2010	Alaivan	Andrew McNamara	Edward O'Grady
2011	Little Green	Paul Townend	Eric McNamara
2012	Burrenbridge Lodge	Tom Doyle	Kieran Purcell
2013	Stocktons Wing	Mark Walsh	Charles O'Brien
2014	Abbyssial	Paul Townend	Willie Mullins
2015	Gwencily Berbas	Adrian Heskin	Alan Fleming
2016	Newberry New	Robbie Power	Jessica Harrington
2017	Dinaria Des Obeaux (Note: Ex Patriot finished first in 2017 but was relegated to second place after a stewards' enquiry)	Bryan Cooper	Gordon Elliott
2018	Mitchouka	Davy Russell	Gordon Elliott
2019	Way Back Home	Robbie Power	Padraig Roche
2020	Burning Victory	Danny Mullins	Willie Mullins
2021	Teahupoo	Robbie Power	Gordon Elliott
2022	Icare Allen	Mark Walsh	Willie Mullins
2023	Zenta	Paul Townend	Willie Mullins
2024	Bottler'secret	Sean Flanagan	Gavin Cromwell
2025	Bacchanalian	Sean O'Keeffe	Declan Queally

== See also ==
- Horse racing in Ireland
- List of Irish National Hunt races
