= Hugh McMahon =

Hugh McMahon may refer to:

- Hugh McMahon (footballer)
- Hugh McMahon (politician)
- Hugh McMahon Memorial Novice Chase
