= Mercedes-Benz Novice Hurdle =

Hurdle horse race in Ireland

Surehaul Mercedes-Benz Novice Hurdle
2026
Lord Rouge	Changeyourstars	Timesareachanging

Previous years
2025
Ballybow	Ballygunner Castle	Kalnoo
2024
Search For Glory	Harvard Guy	Sarah Beara
2023
Monty's Star	Hiddenvalley Lake	Search For Glory
2022
Shantreusse	Eye Van	Monishter Are Mwee
2021
Frontal Assault	Angels Dawn	Brazos

2020-2011
2020
Run Wild Fred	Lord Royal	Floueur
2019
Allaho	Minella Indo	Moskovite
2018
Chris's Dream	Carrigeen Acebo	Burren Life
2017
Monalee	Battleford	Woods Well
2016
Arkwrisht	Westend Star	Dont Tell No One
2015
Roi Des Francs	Fine Article	Wrath Of Titans
2014
Don Poli	Goonyella	Seskinane
2013
Inish Island	Venture Capital	Dushybeag
2012
Folsom Blue	Castle Wings	Knockgraffon King
2011
Bishopsfurze	Skorcher	Fists Of Fury

2010-2003
2010
Quito De La Roque	The Book Thief	Quadrillon
2009
Caim Hill	On The Way Out	Cockleshell Road
2008
Cooldine	The Flying Dustman	Merchent Paddy
2006
Stoneville	Prideoftheyankees	Of Course
2005
Carraig Blue	Oulart	Arc En Ciel
2004
Collier County	Like A Bee	Criaire Princess
2003
Megsie Here	Native Ride	Azur Tonic

The Mercedes-Benz Novice Hurdle is a Grade 3 National Hunt hurdle race in Ireland which is open to horses aged four years or older. It is run at Clonmel over a distance of 3 miles (4,828 metres), and during its running there are 14 flights of hurdles to be jumped. It is scheduled to take place each year in February.

The race was first run in 2003, became a Listed race in 2008 and was awarded Grade 3 status in 2013.

== Records ==
Leading jockey (4 wins):

- Ruby Walsh – Cooldine (2008), Inish Island (2013), Arkwrisht (2016), Allaho (2019)

Leading trainer (7 wins):

- Willie Mullins – Cooldine (2008), Bishopsfurze (2011), Inish Island (2013), Don Poli (2014), Roi Des Francs (2015), Arkwrisht (2016), Allaho (2019)

== Winners ==
Year	Winner	Age	Jockey	Trainer
2003	Megsie Here	6	Derek O'Connor (Note: amateur jockey)	P R Lenihan
2004	Collier County	9	J P Magnier	Edward O'Grady
2005	Carraig Blue	6	M Darcy	E Sheehy
2006	Stoneville	6	Conor O'Dwyer	E McNamara
2007	Abandoned : waterlogged
2008	Cooldine	6	Ruby Walsh	Willie Mullins
2009	On The Way Out	6	T J Doyle	John E Kiely
2009	Caim Hill	6	B T O'Connell	Philip Fenton
2010	Quito De La Roque	6	Davy Russell	Colm Murphy
2011	Bishopsfurze	6	Paul Townend	Willie Mullins
2012	Folsom Blue	5	Davy Russell	Conor O'Dwyer
2013	Inish Island	7	Ruby Walsh	Willie Mullins
2014	Don Poli	5	Bryan Cooper	Willie Mullins
2015	Roi Des Francs	6	Bryan Cooper	Willie Mullins
2016	Arkwrisht	6	Ruby Walsh	Willie Mullins
2017	Monalee	6	David Mullins	Henry de Bromhead
2018	Chris's Dream	6	Mark Walsh	Henry de Bromhead
2019	Allaho	5	Ruby Walsh	Willie Mullins
2020	Run Wild Fred (Note: The 2020 running took place at Punchestown after the original Clonmel fixture was abandoned)	6	Mark Walsh	Gordon Elliott
2021	Frontal Assault (Note: The 2021 running took place at Navan after the original Clonmel fixture was abandoned)	6	Jack Kennedy	Gordon Elliott
2022	Shantreusse	6	Rachael Blackmore	Henry de Bromhead
2023	Monty's Star	6	Sean Flanagan	Henry de Bromhead
2024	Search For Glory	7	Jack Kennedy	Gordon Elliott
2025	Ballybow	6	Sam Ewing	Gordon Elliott
2026	Lord Rouge (Note: The 2026 running took place at Gowran Park after the original Clonmel fixture was abandoned)	5	Danny Gilligan	Gordon Elliott

== See also ==
- Horseracing in Ireland
- List of Irish National Hunt races
