= Knight's Baroness =

British-bred Thoroughbred racehorse

- Sire: Rainbow Quest
- Grandsire: Blushing Groom
- Dam: Knight's Beauty
- Damsire: True Knight
- Sex: Mare
- Foaled: 16 April 1987
- Country: United Kingdom
- Colour: Bay
- Breeder: Newgate Stud Ltd
- Owner: Fahd Salman
- Trainer: Paul Cole
- Record: 7: 2-3-1

Major wins
- Irish Oaks (1990)

Knight's Baroness (16 April 1987 – after 2008) was a British Thoroughbred racehorse and broodmare. In a racing career which lasted from July 1989 until September 1990 she recorded two wins and four places from seven starts. She showed considerable promise as a two-year-old, winning one race and finishing second in the May Hill Stakes and improved when moved up to middle distances in the following year. She was placed in both the Lingfield Oaks Trial and The Oaks before recording her biggest win in the Irish Oaks. After her retirement from racing she became a broodmare and produced several winners including the Cumberland Lodge Stakes winner Riyadian and the Totesport Trophy winner Essex. Her last recorded foal was born in 2006.

== Background ==
Knight's Baroness was a bay mare bred in England by her owner Fahd Salman's Newgate Stud Ltd. Like many of Salman's horses, she was trained throughout her racing career by Paul Cole at Whatcombe in Oxfordshire.

Knight's Baroness was from the first crop of foals sired by Rainbow Quest whose wins included th Coronation Cup and the Prix de l'Arc de Triomphe in the 1985. He went on to become a very successful breeding stallion whose other offspring included Quest for Fame, Saumarez, Sunshack, Spectrum, Nedawi and Millenary. Her dam Knight's Beauty was a successful racemare in North America, winning 12 times from 76 starts between by 1979 and 1983. She was a great-granddaughter of the American broodmare Grass Shack, whose other descendants have included Charismatic and Deputy Minister.

== Racing career ==
=== 1989: two-year-old season ===
Knight's Baroness began her racing career at Wolverhampton Racecourse (then a turf track) when she contested a maiden race over seven furlongs on 3 July 1989. Starting at odds of 8/1 in a ten-runner field she finished strongly and finished second, beaten a neck by the John Gosden-trained favourite Star Child. A month later she contested a similar event at Yarmouth Racecourse and started the 4/1 third choice in a four-runner field. Ridden for the first time by Richard Quinn who partnered her in all her subsequent races she led from the start, went clear of her rivals in the closing stages and won by four lengths despite being eased down in the final strides. The filly was then moved up in class and distance for the Group Three May Hill Stakes over one mile at Doncaster Racecourse in October. After taking the early lead and breaking clear approaching the last quarter mile she was overtaken in the closing stages and beaten into second by the Henry Cecil-trained Rafha (later to win the Prix de Diane).

=== 1990: three-year-old season ===
On her three-year-old debut, Knight's Baroness faced Rafha again in the Oaks Trial Stakes over one and a half miles at Lingfield Park (then a turf track) on 12 May and started the 7/2 second favourite behind her old rival. She took the lead three furlongs out and after being overtaken by Rafha she rallied strongly but was beaten a neck into second place. In The Oaks on 9 June the filly started a 16/1 one outsider in an eight-runner field with Salsabil starting favourite ahead of In The Groove and Kartajana. Knight's Baroness tracked the leaders and stayed on kept on well without being able to accelerate, finishing third behind Salsabil and the 50/1 outsider Game Plan.

On 14 July Knight's Baroness was sent to Ireland and started the 13/8 favourite for the Irish Oaks over one and a half miles on good-to-firm ground at the Curragh. The best fancied of her nine opponents were Pharian (winner of the Cheshire Oaks and Lancashire Oaks), the Italian challenger Atoll (Premio Regina Elena, Oaks d'Italia) and the Dermot Weld-trained Crockadore. The 50/1 outsider Assertion set the pace from Atoll with Quinn settling the favourite just behind the leaders. Atoll went to the front in the straight but Knight's Baroness produced a sustained run to wear down the Italian filly, took the lead in the final strides and won by a neck.

Knight's Baroness was moved up in distance to contest the Group Two Park Hill Stakes over one and three quarter miles at Doncaster on 12 September in which she carried a five-pound weight penalty as a result of her Irish Oaks success. After tracking the leaders, she was unable to make any significant progress in the straight and finished fourth behind Madame Dubois, Applecross and Whitehaven.

== Breeding record ==
After her retirement from racing Knight's Baroness became a broodmare for her owner's Newgate Stud. Following Salman's death she was put up for auction at Tattersalls in December 2002 and was bought for 320,000 guineas by the bloodstock agent Charlie Gordon-Watson. Knight's Baroness produced at least eleven foals and five winners between 1992 and 2004.

- Riyadian, a chestnut colt, foaled in 1992, sired by Polish Precedent. Won five races including the Cumberland Lodge Stakes and finished second in the Champion Stakes.
- Perfect Gift, chestnut filly, 1993, by Generous. Failed to win in ten races.
- Lancea, chestnut filly, 1994, by Generous. Unraced.
- Wales, chestnut colt (later gelded), 1995, by Caerleon. Won three races.
- Mischief, chestnut colt (gelded), 1996, by Generous. Won two races.
- Idolize, chestnut filly, 1997, by Polish Precedent. Won two races.
- Hudson Bay, bay colt (gelded), 1999, by Polish Precedent. Failed to win in five races.
- Essex, bay colt (gelded), 2000, by Sadler's Wells. Won two flat races and seven National Hunt races including the Totesport Trophy and Grimes Hurdle.
- Jojeema, bay filly, 2001, by Barathea. Unraced.
- His Honour, chestnut colt (gelded), 2003, by Grand Lodge. Failed to win in seven races.
- Chevaleresse, bay filly, 2004, by Danehill. Unraced.
- Advocator, bay colt, 2006, by Cape Cross. Unraced.

== Pedigree ==
Pedigree of Knight's Baroness (GB), bay mare, 1987
Sire Rainbow Quest (USA) 1981	Blushing Groom (FR); 1974	Red God	Nasrullah
Sire Rainbow Quest (USA) 1981	Blushing Groom (FR); 1974	Red God	Spring Run
Sire Rainbow Quest (USA) 1981	Blushing Groom (FR); 1974	Runaway Bride	Wild Risk
Sire Rainbow Quest (USA) 1981	Blushing Groom (FR); 1974	Runaway Bride	Aimee
Sire Rainbow Quest (USA) 1981	I Will Follow (USA); 1975	Herbager	Vandale
Sire Rainbow Quest (USA) 1981	I Will Follow (USA); 1975	Herbager	Flagette
Sire Rainbow Quest (USA) 1981	I Will Follow (USA); 1975	Where You Lead	Raise A Native
Sire Rainbow Quest (USA) 1981	I Will Follow (USA); 1975	Where You Lead	Noblesse
Dam Knights Beauty (USA) 1977	True Knight (USA); 1969	Chateaugay	Swaps
Dam Knights Beauty (USA) 1977	True Knight (USA); 1969	Chateaugay	Banquet Bell
Dam Knights Beauty (USA) 1977	True Knight (USA); 1969	Stealaway	Olympia
Dam Knights Beauty (USA) 1977	True Knight (USA); 1969	Stealaway	Dashing By
Dam Knights Beauty (USA) 1977	Broadway Beauty (USA); 1973	Chompion	Tompion
Dam Knights Beauty (USA) 1977	Broadway Beauty (USA); 1973	Chompion	Mahratta
Dam Knights Beauty (USA) 1977	Broadway Beauty (USA); 1973	Grass Roots	Discovery
Dam Knights Beauty (USA) 1977	Broadway Beauty (USA); 1973	Grass Roots	Grass Shack (Family: 10-a)
