= Poplar Square Chase =

Steeplechase horse race in Ireland

Poplar Square Chase
2026
Irish Panther	Kopek Des Bordes	Westport Cove

Previous years
2025
Only By Night	Champ Kiely	Ile Atlantique
2024
Quilixios	Marine Nationale	Hercule Du Seuil
2023
Dinoblue	Fil Dor	Hope Des Blins
2022
Jeremys Flame	Gallant John Joe	Francin
2021
Captain Guinness	Andy Dufresne	Felix Desjy

2020-2011
2020
Notebook	Fakir D'Oudairies	Djingle
2019
Cilaos Emery	Ornua	Kildorrery
2018
Saint Calvados	Tycoon Prince	Arkwrisht
2017
Ball D'arc	Ordinary World	American Tom
2016
Tell Us More	The Game Changer	Alisier D'irlande
2015
Devils Bride	Sizing Granite	Azorian
2014
Moscow Mannon	Felix Yonger	Mount Colah
2013
Twinlight	Oscars Well	Realt Mor
2012
Hidden Cyclone	Foildubh	Rathlin
2011
Noble Prince	Jigalo	Osirixamix

2010-2001
2010
Captain Cee Bee	Archie Boy	Catch Me
2009
Tranquil Sea	Joncol	Trafford Lad
2008
Thyne Again	Emotional Article	Moscow Breeze
2007
Coolgreaney	Gemini Lucy	Dbest
2006
Southern Vic	Macs Flamingo	Lakil Princess
2005
Watson Lake	Green Belt Flyer	Euro Leader
2004
Colonel Rayburn	Central House	John James
2003
Kadoun	Rathgar Beau	Ground Ball
2002
Copernicus	Native Upmanship	Native Commander
2001
Knife Edge	Shannon Gale	Killultagh Storm

2000-1997
2000
To Your Honour	Go Roger Go	Klairon Davis
1999
Ollimar	Amberleigh House	Hill Society
1997
Merry Gale	Opera Hat	Persian Halo

The Poplar Square Chase is a Grade 3 National Hunt steeplechase in Ireland. It is run at Naas Racecourse in late October or early November over a distance of about 2 miles (3,218 metres).

The race was first run in 1997 and was awarded Grade 3 status in 2003. It was run as a Grade 2 race as a one-off in 2020.

== Records ==
Leading jockey (3 wins):

- Davy Russell– Thyne Again (2008), Noble Prince (2011), Moscow Mannon (2014)

Leading trainer (4 wins):

- Willie Mullins - Twinlight (2013), Devils Bride (2015), Cilaos Emery (2019), Dinoblue (2023)
- Henry de Bromhead - Moscow Mannon (2014), Notebook (2020), Captain Guinness (2021), Quilixios (2024)

== Winners ==
Year	Winner	Age	Jockey	Trainer
1997	Merry Gale	9	Norman Williamson	Jim Dreaper
1999	Ollimar	7	Paul Moloney	Jim Dreaper
2000	To Your Honour	7	Barry Geraghty	Francis Flood
2001	Knife Edge	6	Thomas Rudd	Michael O'Brien
2002	Copernicus	7	Paul Carberry	Pat Hughes
2003	Kadoun	6	Mr D W Cullen	Michael O'Brien
2004	Colonel Rayburn	8	John Cullen	Paul Nolan
2005	Watson Lake	7	Paul Carberry	Noel Meade
2006	Southern Vic	7	Conor O'Dwyer	Ted Walsh
2007	Coolgreaney	6	T J Doyle	Seán Treacy
2008	Thyne Again	7	Davy Russell	Liam Burke
2009	Tranquil Sea	7	Andrew McNamara	Edward O'Grady
2010	Captain Cee Bee	9	Mark Walsh	Edward P Harty
2011	Noble Prince	7	Davy Russell	Paul Nolan
2012	Hidden Cyclone	7	Andrew McNamara	John Joseph Hanlon
2013	Twinlight	6	Ruby Walsh	Willie Mullins
2014	Moscow Mannon	8	Davy Russell	Henry de Bromhead
2015	Devils Bride	8	David Mullins	Willie Mullins
2016	Tell Us More	7	Keith Donoghue	Gordon Elliott
2017	Ball D'Arc	6	Jack Kennedy	Gordon Elliott
2018	Saint Calvados	5	Gavin Sheehan	Harry Whittington
2019	Cilaos Emery	7	Paul Townend	Willie Mullins
2020	Notebook	7	Rachael Blackmore	Henry de Bromhead
2021	Captain Guinness	6	Rachael Blackmore	Henry de Bromhead
2022	Jeremys Flame	8	Luke Dempsey	Gavin Cromwell
2023	Dinoblue	6	Mark Walsh	Willie Mullins
2024	Quilixios	7	Darragh O'Keeffe	Henry de Bromhead
2025	Only By Night	7	Keith Donoghue	Gavin Cromwell
2026	Irish Panther	9	Kieren Buckley	Eddie & Patrick Harty

== See also ==
- Horse racing in Ireland
- List of Irish National Hunt races
