= Kingsfurze Novice Hurdle =

National Hunt hurdle race

Kingsfurze Novice Hurdle
2026
Le Labo	Blake	Parnell Street

Previous years
2025
Gaucher	Goraibhmaithagat	Stormalong
2024
Fun Fun Fun	Mahon's Way	Mirazur West
2023
Irish Point	No Looking Back	Lily Du Berlais
2022
Highland Charge	Vina Ardanza	Slip Of The Tongue
2021
On Eagles Wings	Goodbye Someday	Shadow Rider

2020-2013
2020
Cedarwood Road	Beacon Edge	Entoucas
2019
Gallant John Joe	Mister Blue Sky	Hearts Are Trumps
2018
Cartwright	Articulum	Nessun Dorma
2017
Bleu Berry	Outspoken	Minella Till Dawn
2016
Sutton Place	Royal Caviar	Burgas
2015
Phil's Magic	Prince Of Scars	Henry Higgins
2014
Empire Of Dirt	The Game Changer	Sizing Codelco
2013
Mallowney	Shrapnel	Moscow Mannon

The Kingsfurze Novice Hurdle is a Grade 3 National Hunt hurdle race in Ireland. It is run at Naas over a distance of about 2 miles (3,218 metres), and it is scheduled to take place each year in March.

The race was first run in 2013 with Listed status. It was raised to Grade 3 in 2021.

== Records ==
Most successful jockey (2 wins):

- Davy Russell - Cedarwood Road (2020), Irish Point (2023)
- Paul Townend - Bleu Berry (2017), Fun Fun Fun (2024)

Most successful trainer (3 wins):

- Gordon Elliott– Sutton Place (2016), Cartwright (2018), Irish Point (2023)
- Willie Mullins - Bleu Berry (2017), Fun Fun Fun (2024), Gaucher (2025)

== Winners ==
Year	Winner	Age	Jockey	Trainer
2013	Mallowney	7	Paul Carberry	Timothy Doyle
2014	Empire Of Dirt	7	Bryan Cooper	Colm Murphy
2015	Phil's Magic	5	Jonathan Burke	Sandra Hughes
2016	Sutton Place	5	Barry Geraghty	Gordon Elliott
2017	Bleu Berry	6	Paul Townend	Willie Mullins
2018	Cartwright	5	Jack Kennedy	Gordon Elliott
2019	Gallant John Joe	6	Barry Browne	Oliver McKiernan
2020	Cedarwood Road	5	Davy Russell	Gearoid O'Loughlin
2021	On Eagles Wings	7	Harry Swan	Tim Hyde
2022	Highland Charge	7	Sean Flanagan	Noel Meade
2023	Irish Point	5	Davy Russell	Gordon Elliott
2024	Fun Fun Fun	6	Paul Townend	Willie Mullins
2025	Gaucher	6	Brian Hayes	Willie Mullins

== See also ==
- Horse racing in Ireland
- List of Irish National Hunt races
