= Salsabil (horse) =

Irish-bred Thoroughbred racehorse

- Racing colours of Hamdan Al Maktoum
- Sire: Sadler's Wells
- Grandsire: Northern Dancer
- Dam: Flame of Tara
- Damsire: Artaius
- Sex: Mare
- Foaled: 18 January 1987
- Country: Ireland
- Colour: Bay
- Breeder: Kilcarn Stud
- Owner: Hamdan Al Maktoum
- Trainer: John Dunlop
- Record: 9: 7-1-0
- Earnings: £743,461

Major wins
- Prix Marcel Boussac (1989); Fred Darling Stakes (1990); 1000 Guineas (1990); Epsom Oaks (1990); Irish Derby (1990); Prix Vermeille (1990)

Honours
- Timeform rating 130

Salsabil (18 January 1987 – October 1996) was an Irish-bred, British-trained Thoroughbred racehorse and broodmare. In a racing career which lasted from September 1989 to October 1990 she ran nine times and won seven races. Salsabil was one of the leading two-year-old fillies in Europe in 1989, winning two races including the Group One Prix Marcel Boussac at the Longchamp. After winning the Fred Darling Stakes on her three-year-old debut, Salsabil won both of Britain's Classic races for fillies: the 1000 Guineas over one mile at Newmarket and the Oaks over one and a half miles at Epsom. She was then raced against colts and became the first filly for ninety years to win the Irish Derby at the Curragh. In autumn, Salsabil added a victory in the Prix Vermeille at Longchamp but finished unplaced when favourite for the Prix de l'Arc de Triomphe in October. Salsabil was then retired to stud where she had success as a broodmare before dying of cancer in 1996.

== Background ==
Salsabil was a bay filly with a white blaze bred in County Meath, Ireland by the Kilcarn Stud. Salsabil was one of the first champions sired by Sadler's Wells and her earnings in 1990 enabled the stallion to win the first of his thirteen sires' championships. Salsabil's dam, Flame of Tara, won the Coronation Stakes in 1983, and went on to be an extremely successful broodmare. Apart from Salsabil, she produced eleven winners including Marju, a colt who won the St. James's Palace Stakes and finished second in The Derby. As a descendant of the broodmare Aloe, Flame of Tara was related to Pebbles, Round Table, Nashwan, Go For Wand and many other successful racehorses.

As a yearling, Salsabil was bought for the equivalent of $800,000 by Hamdan Al Maktoum. She was named Salsabil (Arabic سلسبيل) after a spring in the Islamic paradise. The filly was trained throughout her career by John Dunlop at Arundel, West Sussex. She was ridden in all of her races by Willie Carson.

== Racing career ==
=== 1989: two-year-old season ===
Salsabil began her racing career in a six furlong maiden race at Nottingham Racecourse in September. She started 4/5 favourite and won easily by three lengths. Later that month Salsabil started at odds of 4/9 for the Jack Collier Memorial Stakes at Newbury, but after leading a furlong from the finish she was caught in the closing stages and beaten a short head by Free At Last. Eighteen days after her Newbury defeat, Salsabil was stepped up in class for the Group One Prix Marcel Boussac at Longchamp. Salsabil turned into the straight in sixth place before taking the lead and being driven out by Carson to win by two lengths from Houseproud, a filly who went on to win the Poule d'Essai des Pouliches.

=== 1990: three-year-old season ===
On her first appearance as a three-year-old, Salsabil was sent to Newbury for the Fred Darling Stakes, a trial race for the 1000 Guineas. The race attracted a strong field for a Group Three race, and Salsabil started third favourite behind Dead Certain, the Cheveley Park Stakes winner and Chimes of Freedom, the winner of the Moyglare Stud Stakes. Carson positioned the filly in fifth place before moving into the lead a quarter of a mile from the finish. Salsabil drew away from her opponents to win by six lengths. Thirteen days later, Salsabil started 6/4 favourite for the 1000 Guineas over Newmarket's Rowley Mile course. Her opponents included Free at Last, the filly who had inflicted her only defeat, and Heart of Joy, the unbeaten winner of the Nell Gwyn Stakes. Salsabil challenged Heart of Joy for the lead inside the final furlong and was hard ridden by Carson to win by three-quarters of a lengths. Negligent was five lengths further back in third.

A month later Salsabil was moved up in distance for the one and a half mile Epsom Oaks and started 2/1 favourite, just ahead of the Irish 1000 Guineas winner In the Groove. Racing on softer ground than at Newmarket, Salsabil was restrained by Carson in the early stages before moving up to take the lead in the straight. She pulled clear of the field to win by five lengths from Game Plan, with Knight's Baroness in third and In the Groove finishing fourth. After the Oaks, Salsabil's connections took the unusual step of sending her to contest the Irish Derby against colts. Few fillies had contested the race, and none had been successful since Gallinaria in 1900. The field included Quest for Fame and Blue Stag, first and second in The Derby and Sheikh Mohammed's highly rated Belmez. Salsabil took the lead in the straight and won by three quarters of a length from the outsider Deploy, with a gap of four lengths back to Belmez, who narrowly beat Blue Stag and Quest for Fame for third.

Salsabil was rested until autumn, when she returned with the Prix de l'Arc de Triomphe at her target. In September, she started 2/5 favourite for the Prix Vermeille at Longchamp over the Arc course and distance. Salsabil took the lead in the straight, but had to be driven out by Carson to prevail by a neck and half a length from Miss Alleged and In the Groove. On 7 October, Salsabil started favourite against twenty opponents in the Prix de l'Arc de Triomphe, despite being given an unfavourable draw. She failed to reproduce her best form and was never in contention, finishing tenth behind Saumarez.

== Assessment and honours ==
The independent Timeform organisation gave Salsabil a rating of 130.

In their book, A Century of Champions, based on the Timeform rating system, John Randall and Tony Morris rated Salsabil a "superior" winner of the 1000 Guineas and Oaks and the thirtieth best filly or mare trained in Britain or Ireland in the 20th century.

Shadwell's Salsabil Stud, near Bury St Edmunds, was named in honour of the mare.

The Salsabil Stakes a Listed race for three-year-old fillies, is run at Navan Racecourse in April.

== Stud record ==
Salsabil retired to become a broodmare for Shadwell Stud. In five years, she produced five foals, four of whom won races, three at Group level. Sahm, her only colt, won the Knickerbocker Handicap, Bint Salsabil won the Rockfel Stakes and Alabaq won the Premio Bagutta Memorial Sergio Cumani. In October 1996, Salsabil was euthanized after being diagnosed with cancer of the colon, and was buried at Shadwell Stud.

== Pedigree ==
Pedigree of Salsabil (GB), bay mare, 1987
Sire Sadler's Wells (USA) 1981	Northern Dancer; 1961	Nearctic	Nearco
Sire Sadler's Wells (USA) 1981	Northern Dancer; 1961	Nearctic	Lady Angela
Sire Sadler's Wells (USA) 1981	Northern Dancer; 1961	Natalma	Native Dancer
Sire Sadler's Wells (USA) 1981	Northern Dancer; 1961	Natalma	Almahmoud
Sire Sadler's Wells (USA) 1981	Fairy Bridge; 1975	Bold Reason	Hail to Reason
Sire Sadler's Wells (USA) 1981	Fairy Bridge; 1975	Bold Reason	Lalun
Sire Sadler's Wells (USA) 1981	Fairy Bridge; 1975	Special	Forli
Sire Sadler's Wells (USA) 1981	Fairy Bridge; 1975	Special	Thong
Dam Flame of Tara (IRE) 1980	Artaius; 1974	Round Table	Princequillo
Dam Flame of Tara (IRE) 1980	Artaius; 1974	Round Table	Knights Daughter
Dam Flame of Tara (IRE) 1980	Artaius; 1974	Stylish Pattern	My Babu
Dam Flame of Tara (IRE) 1980	Artaius; 1974	Stylish Pattern	Sunset Gun
Dam Flame of Tara (IRE) 1980	Welsh Flame; 1973	Welsh Pageant	Tudor Melody
Dam Flame of Tara (IRE) 1980	Welsh Flame; 1973	Welsh Pageant	Picture Light
Dam Flame of Tara (IRE) 1980	Welsh Flame; 1973	Electric Flash	Crepello
Dam Flame of Tara (IRE) 1980	Welsh Flame; 1973	Electric Flash	Lightning (Family:2-f)
