= John and Chich Fowler Memorial Mares Chase =

Steeplechase horse race in Ireland

Fowler Memorial Mares Chase
2026
Dinoblue	Shecouldbeanything	Only two finished

Previous years
2025
Allegorie De Vassy	Limerick Lace	Malina Girl
2024
Riviere D'etel	Allegorie De Vassy	Instit
2023
Scarlet And Dove	Dolcita	Ballyshannon Rose
2022
Mount Ida	Elimay	Scarlet And Dove
2021
Agusta Gold	Moyhenna	Cabaret Queen

2020-2011
2019
Camelia De Cotte	Pravalaguna	Barra
2018
Youcantcallherthat	Asthuria	West Bridge
2017
Slowmotion	Keppols Queen	Girly Girl
2016
Emily Gray	Uranna	Perfect Promise
2015
Vroum Vroum Mag	Burn And Turn	Dazzling Susie
2014
Une Artiste	Nadiya De La Vega	Burn And Turn
2013
Nadiya De La Vega	Avondhu Lady	Burn And Turn
2012
Askanna	Banjaxed Girl	Gentle Alice
2011
Coscorrig	Cruising Katie	For Bill

2010-2009
2009
Cara Mara	Shuil Aris	Inistioge

The John and Chich Fowler Memorial Mares Chase is a Grade 3 National Hunt chase in Ireland which is open to mares aged five years or older. It is run at Fairyhouse over a distance of 2 miles and 4 furlongs (4,023 metres), and it is scheduled to take place each year in January.

The race was originally run in honour of John Fowler, an amateur jockey and trainer (son of Bryan Fowler and brother of Jessica Harrington), who was killed in an accident at Rahinston in December 2008, Fowler's widow, Chich, died in 2013 and her name was added to the race title from that year.

The race was first run in December 2009, but from 2011 the name was transferred to the existing mares chase run at the Easter meeting.

The race was awarded Grade 3 status in 2012. It was moved to a date in January from the 2021 running.

== Records ==
Most successful jockey (2 wins):

- Bryan Cooper - Coscorrig (2011), Scarlet and Dove (2023)
- Paul Townend - Camelia De Cotte (2019), Allegorie De Vassy (2025)
- Mark Walsh - Slowmotion (2017), Dinoblue (2026)

Most successful trainer (4 wins):

- Willie Mullins– Vroum Vroum Mag (2015), Camelia De Cotte (2019), Allegorie De Vassy (2025), Dinoblue (2026)

== Winners ==
Year	Winner	Age	Jockey	Trainer
2009	Cara Mara	7	R M Moran	J A Berry
2010	No race
2011	Coscorrig	9	Bryan Cooper	Dessie Hughes
2012	Askanna	7	Andrew McNamara	Colin Bowe
2013	Nadiya De La Vega	7	Tony McCoy	Nicky Henderson
2014	Une Artiste	6	Barry Geraghty	Nicky Henderson
2015	Vroum Vroum Mag	6	Ruby Walsh	Willie Mullins
2016	Emily Gray	8	Johnny Burke	Kim Bailey
2017	Slowmotion	5	Mark Walsh	Joseph O'Brien
2018	Youcantcallherthat (Note: the 2018 race took place in mid-April after the original fixture was abandoned due to waterlogging)	7	Denis Hogan	Denis Hogan
2019	Camelia De Cotte	7	Paul Townend	Willie Mullins
2021	Agusta Gold	8	Danny Mullins	Margaret Mullins
2022	Mount Ida	8	Davy Russell	Gordon Elliott
2023	Scarlet And Dove	9	Bryan Cooper	Joseph O'Brien
2024	Riviere D'etel	7	Jack Kennedy	Gordon Elliott
2025	Allegorie De Vassy	8	Paul Townend	Willie Mullins
2026	Dinoblue	9	Mark Walsh	Willie Mullins

== See also ==
- Horse racing in Ireland
- List of Irish National Hunt races
