= Dublin Chase =

Steeplechase horse race in Ireland

Dublin Chase
2026
Majborough	Marine Nationale	Found A Fifty

Previous years
2025
Solness	Marine Nationale	Gaelic Warrior
2024
El Fabiolo	Dinoblue	Captain Guinness
2023
Gentleman De Mee	Blue Lord	Sceau Royal
2022
Chacun Pour Soi	Dunvegan	Captain Guinness
2021
Chacun Pour Soi	Fakir D'Oudairies	Notebook

2020-2018
2020
Chacun Pour Soi	Min	Ornua
2019
Min	Ordinary World	Saint Calvados
2018
Min	Simply Ned	Special Tiara

The Dublin Chase is a Grade 1 National Hunt steeplechase in Ireland which is open to horses aged five years or older. It is run at Leopardstown over a distance of about 2 miles and 1 furlong (3,420 metres), and during its running there are eleven fences to be jumped. The race is scheduled to take place each year in early February. The race was first run as a Grade 2 race in 2018 as part of a new Dublin Racing Festival and was upgraded to Grade 1 status from the 2019 running.

== Records ==
Most successful horse (3 wins):

- Chacun Pour Soi - 2020, 2021, 2022

Leading jockey (4 wins):

- Paul Townend - Chacun Pour Soi (2020, 2021, 2022), El Fabiolo (2024)

Leading trainer (8 wins):

- Willie Mullins - Min (2018, 2019), Chacun Pour Soi (2020, 2021, 2022), Gentleman De Mee (2023), El Fabiolo (2024), Majborough (2026)

== Winners ==
Year	Winner	Age	Jockey	Trainer
2018	Min	7	David Mullins	Willie Mullins
2019	Min	8	Ruby Walsh	Willie Mullins
2020	Chacun Pour Soi	8	Paul Townend	Willie Mullins
2021	Chacun Pour Soi	9	Paul Townend	Willie Mullins
2022	Chacun Pour Soi	10	Paul Townend	Willie Mullins
2023	Gentleman De Mee	7	Danny Mullins	Willie Mullins
2024	El Fabiolo Majborough	7	Paul Townend	Willie Mullins
2025	Solness	7	Danny Mullins	Joseph O'Brien
2026	Majborough	6	Mark Walsh	Willie Mullins

== See also ==
- Horse racing in Ireland
- List of Irish National Hunt races
