= An Riocht Chase =

Steeplechase horse race in Ireland

An Riocht Chase
2026
Senecia	Three Card Brag	Jesse Evans

Previous years
2025
Hercule Du Seuil	Blood Destiny	Jesse Evans
2024
Ash Tree Meadow	French Dynamite	Gentleman De Mee
2023
Saint Sam	Effernock Fizz	Telmesomethinggirl
2022
Easy Game	Melon	Gin On Lime
2021
Samcro	Cilaos Emery	Peregrine Run

2020-2016
2020
Peregrine Run	Robin Des Foret	Paloma Blue
2019
Peregrine Run	Jett	Mrs Lovett
2018
Ballyoisin	Alisier D'Irlande	Shaneshill
2017
Ballycasey	Rock The World	Devils Bride
2016
Clarcam	The Game Changer	Viconte Du Noyer

The An Riocht Chase is a Grade 3 National Hunt steeplechase in Ireland. It is run at Killarney in May, over a distance of about 2 miles and 4½ furlongs (4,073 metres) and during its running there are 14 fences to be jumped.

The race was first run at Grade 3 level in 2016 having previously been an ungraded conditions race. An Riocht is Gaelic for The Kingdom.

== Records ==
Most successful horse (2 wins):

- Peregrine Run – 2019, 2020

Most successful jockey (2 wins):

- Kevin Sexton - Peregrine Run (2019, 2020)
- Jack Kennedy - Clarcam (2016), Samcro (2021)

Most successful trainer (4 wins):

- Willie Mullins - Ballycasey (2017), Easy Game (2022), Saint Sam (2023), Hercule Du Seuil (2025)

== Winners ==
Year	Winner	Age	Weight	Jockey	Trainer
2016	Clarcam	6	11-02	Jack Kennedy	Gordon Elliott
2017	Ballycasey	10	11-10	Ruby Walsh	Willie Mullins
2018	Ballyoisin	7	11-02	Barry Geraghty	Enda Bolger
2019	Peregrine Run	9	11-02	Kevin Sexton	Peter Fahey
2020	Peregrine Run (Note: The 2020 race was run in July due to the COVID-19 pandemic in the Republic of Ireland)	10	11-10	Kevin Sexton	Peter Fahey
2021	Samcro	9	12-00	Jack Kennedy	Denise Foster
2022	Easy Game	8	11-08	Brian Hayes	Willie Mullins
2023	Saint Sam	6	11-03	Paul Townend	Willie Mullins
2024	Ash Tree Meadow	8	11-08	Sam Ewing	Gordon Elliott
2025	Hercule Du Seuil	8	11-00	Mark Walsh	Willie Mullins
2026	Senecia	9	11-08	Phillip Enright	Vincent Halley

== See also ==
- Horse racing in Ireland
- List of Irish National Hunt races
