= Galway Races =

Irish horse racing festival

Galway Races Rásaí na Gaillimhe
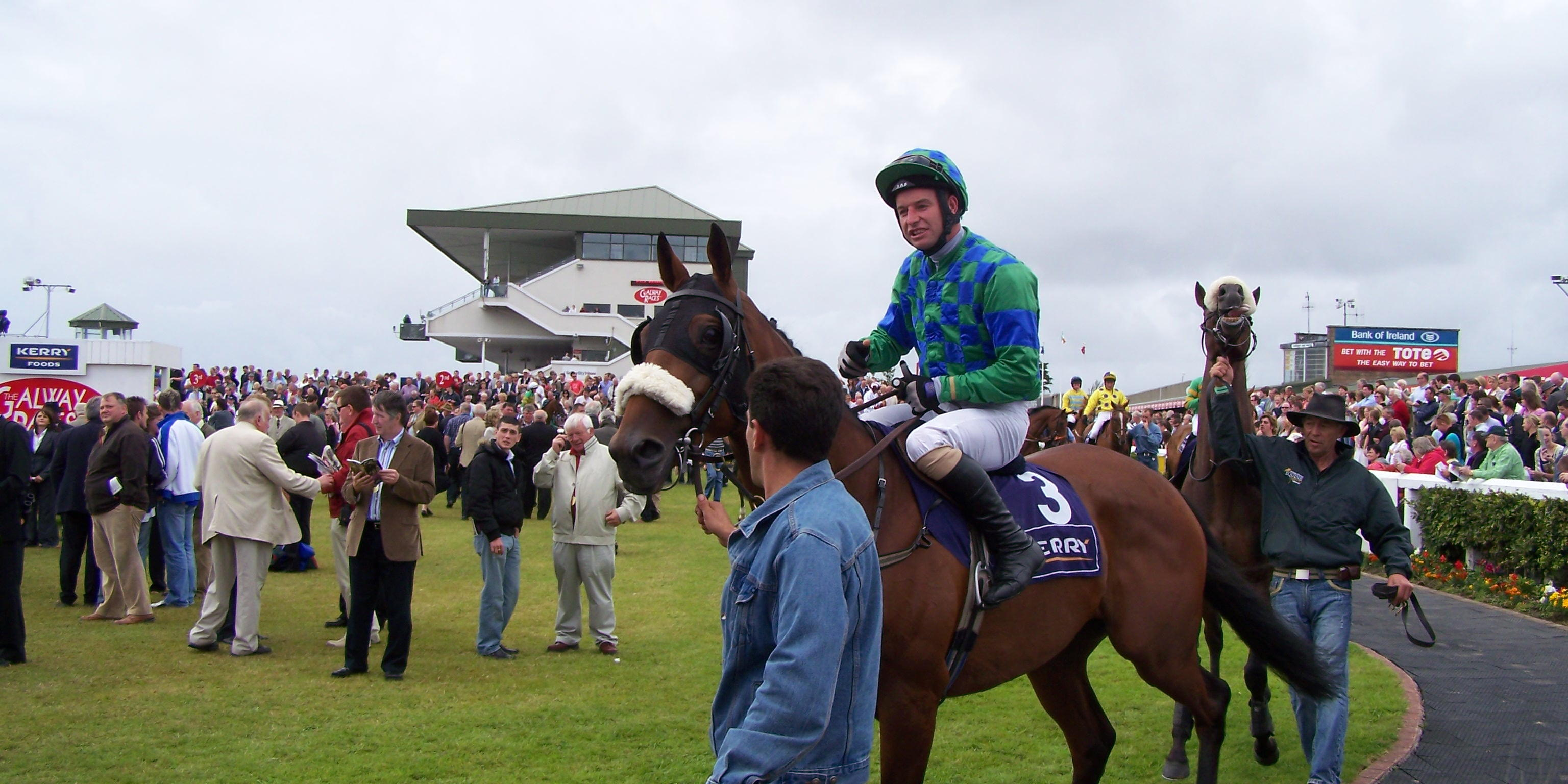
- Jockey and horses preparing for the races
- Genre: Horse-racing festival
- Frequency: Annually; last Monday of July
- Venue: Ballybrit Racecourse, Ballybrit, County Galway, Ireland
- Coordinates: 53°17′45″N 8°59′45″W
- Country: Ireland
- Years active: 157
- Inaugurated: 17 August 1869
- Attendance: 150,000+
- Website: galwayraces.com

The Galway Races (Irish: Rásaí na Gaillimhe) is an Irish horse-racing festival that starts on the last Monday of July every year. Held at Ballybrit Racecourse in Galway, Ireland over seven days, it is one of the longest of all the race meets that occur in Ireland.

The busiest days of the festival are Wednesday, when the Galway Plate is held, and Thursday, when the Galway Hurdle and Ladies' Day take place.

== Festival history ==
The first racing festival held in Ballybrit was a two-day event with the first race meeting on Tuesday, 17 August 1869. The summer festival was extended to a 3-day meeting in 1959, 4 days in 1971, 5 days in 1974, 6 days in 1982 and, most recently to, 7 days in 1999. The summer festival is the highlight of the business year for most local businesses as crowds and horses flock from all over the world to attend one of the world's biggest race meetings.

The pub underneath the Corrib Stand, built in 1955, was for many years the longest bar in the world. It was replaced by the Millennium Stand which opened in 1999. The Killanin Stand opened in 2007 replacing the old Corrib (west) Stand.

On the 4th day of the Galway races there was a race meeting held in Tuam. The last race meeting held at Tuam racecourse was in 1973.

Additional race meetings also take place in September and October, but these are not as popular as the summer festival, which draws more than 150,000 spectators.

On 21 April 2020, the Galway Race Committee announced that the 2020 summer festival—scheduled for 27 July to 2 August—was cancelled due to the COVID-19 pandemic and would be held behind closed doors for the first time since 1869.

The 2021 festival was held with a maximum of 1,000 people allowed to attend each day.

The festival returned to full capacity in 2022, with over 116,000 people attending over the week. In 2023, over 122,000 visitors were recorded.

== In culture ==
The Galway Races are the subject of At Galway Races, a poem by W. B. Yeats. They are also the subject of an eponymous folk song, popularized by The Clancy Brothers, The Chieftains, and The Dubliners. The Celtic rock band, JSD Band played it on their album, Travelling Days. The song also appears on The Kreellers 2008 release, Sixth and Porter. Further, it constitutes the last third of the track Medley on the 1988 album If I Should Fall from Grace with God by The Pogues (the two first parts being The Recruiting Sergeant and an instrumental version of Rocky Road to Dublin).

In 2009, TG4 broadcast a comedy TV series, Rásaí na Gaillimhe, that unfolds during Galway Race Week.
