= Naas Racecourse Business Club Novice Chase =

Steeplechase horse race in Ireland

Woodlands Park Novice Chase
2026
Argento Boy	Bossofthebrownies	The Enabler

Previous years
2025
Dancing City	Bioluminescence	Good Land
2024
Embassy Gardens	Sandor Clegane	Letsbeclearaboutit
2023
Thedevilscoachman	Ramillies	Amirite
2022
Stattler	Farouk D'Alene	Vanillier
2021
Eklat De Rire	Escaria Ten	Pencilfulloflead

2020-2011
2020
Carefully Selected	Forza Milan	Elwood
2019
Ballyward	Chris's Dream	Champagne Classic
2018
Moulin A Vent	Jury Duty	Livelovelaugh
2017
Anibale Fly	A Genie In Abottle	Balko Des Flos
2016
Roi Des Francs	Pont Alexandre	Sub Lieutenant
2015
Wounded Warrior	Rule The World	Lots Of Memories
2014
Foxrock	Sizing Gold	Clar Na Mionn
2013
Tofino Bay	Aupcharlie	One Cool Shabra
2012
Medical Card	Crash	Allee Garde
2011
Quito De La Roque	Western Charmer	Slippers Percy

2010-2001
2010
Oscar Looby	Alpha Ridge	Telenor
2009
Parsons Pistol	Good Fella	Chiraaz
2008
Pomme Tiepy	Kilcrea Castle	Torduff King
2007
Chelsea Harbour	O'Muircheartaigh	Romek
2006
Southern Vic	Church Island	Homer Wells
2005
Point Barrow	Lincam	Mutineer
2004
Lord Who	Jim	John James
2003
I'vehadit	The Premier Cat	Intelligent
2002
Takagi	Copernicus	Risk Accessor
2001
Sackville	Rose Of Inchiquin	Knights Of Kerry

2000-1992
2000
Saxophone	Its Time For A Win	Gill's Honey
1999
Rince Ri	Stanley Steamer	Brambledale
1998
Blue Irish	Wyatt	Private Peace
1997
Ultra Flutter	Amble Speedy	Le Ginno
1996
Shanagarry	Spankers Hill	Beat The Second
1995
Lacken Cross	The Bluebell Polka	Wayuphill
1994
Another Excuse	Titian Blonde	Sullane River
1993
Deep Bramble	Commercial Artist	Dysart Lass
1992
Mass Appeal	Captain Brandy	Chattering

The Naas Racecourse Business Club Novice Chase is a Grade 3 National Hunt steeplechase in Ireland. It is run at Naas Racecourse in January over a distance of about 3 miles (4,828 metres) and during its running there are 16 fences to be jumped..

The race was first run in 1992, and was awarded Grade 3 status in 1996. It was upgraded to Grade 2 in 2004 and downgraded back to Grade 3 in 2017. From 2000 to 2018 it was run as the Woodlands Park 100 Club Novice Chase.

== Records ==
Most successful jockey (4 wins):

- Paul Carberry – Lord Who (2004), Parsons Pistol (2009), Oscar Looby (2010), Wounded Warrior (2015)
- Paul Townend - Carefully Selected (2020), Stattler (2022), Embassy Gardens (2024), Dancing City (2025)

Most successful trainer (7 wins):

- Willie Mullins - Pomme Tiepy (2008), Roi Des Francs (2016), Ballyward (2019), Carefully Selected (2020), Stattler (2022), Embassy Gardens (2024), Dancing City (2025)

== Winners ==
Year	Winner	Age	Jockey	Trainer
1992	Mass Appeal	7	Charlie Swan	Victor Bowens
1993	Deep Bramble	6	Enda Bolger (Note: amateur jockey)	Michael Hourigan
1994	Another Excuse	6	W M O'Sullivan	Eugene M O'Sullivan
1995	Lacken Cross	7	Charlie Swan	Aidan O'Brien
1996	Shanagarry	7	B Moran	Patrick Heffernan
1997	Ultra Flutter	10	Shane Broderick	Michael Hourigan
1998	Blue Irish	7	Norman Williamson	Mrs Sue Bramall
1999	Rince Ri	6	Ruby Walsh	Ted Walsh
2000	Saxophone	7	Tommy Treacy	Jim Dreaper
2001	Sackville	8	David Casey	Frances Crowley
2002	Takagi	7	Gerald Cotter	Edward O'Grady
2003	I'vehadit	9	Roger Loughran	Dessie Hughes
2004	Lord Who	7	Paul Carberry	Pat Doyle
2005	Point Barrow	7	J P Elliott	P Hughes
2006	Southern Vic	7	Conor O'Dwyer	Ted Walsh
2007	Chelsea Harbour	7	Davy Russell	Thomas Mullins
2008	Pomme Tiepy (Note: The 2008 race took place at Leopardstown)	5	Ruby Walsh	Willie Mullins
2009	Parsons Pistol	7	Paul Carberry	Noel Meade
2010	Oscar Looby	7	Paul Carberry	Noel Meade
2011	Quito De La Roque	7	Davy Russell	Colm Murphy
2012	Medical Card	8	Davy Condon	Noel Meade
2013	Tofino Bay	10	Davy Russell	Dessie Hughes
2014	Foxrock	6	David Mullins	Ted Walsh
2015	Wounded Warrior	6	Paul Carberry	Noel Meade
2016	Roi Des Francs	7	Bryan Cooper	Willie Mullins
2017	Anibale Fly	7	Mark Walsh	Tony Martin
2018	Moulin A Vent	6	Sean Flanagan	Noel Meade
2019	Ballyward	7	Ruby Walsh	Willie Mullins
2020	Carefully Selected	8	Paul Townend	Willie Mullins
2021	Eklat De Rire	7	Rachael Blackmore	Henry de Bromhead
2022	Stattler	7	Paul Townend	Willie Mullins
2023	Thedevilscoachman (Note: Ramillies finished first in 2023 but was placed second after a stewards' enquiry)	7	Bryan Cooper	Noel Meade
2024	Embassy Gardens	8	Paul Townend	Willie Mullins
2025	Dancing City	8	Paul Townend	Willie Mullins

== See also ==
- Horse racing in Ireland
- List of Irish National Hunt races
