= Rathbarry & Glenview Studs Hurdle =

Hurdle horse race in Ireland

Irish Strawberry Hurdle
2026
Slade Steel	Kawaboomga	Storm Heart

Previous years
2025
Maxxum	Gala Marceau	Feet Of A Dancer
2024
Brewin'upastorm	Zarak The Brave	Thedevilscoachman
2023
Asterion Forlonge	Monkfish	Beacon Edge
2022
Darasso	Santa Rossa	Grand Roi
2021
Stormy Ireland	French Dynamite	Sixshooter

2020-2011
2019
Rashaan	Not Many Left	Off You Go
2018
Coquin Mans	Diamond Cauchois	Let's Dance
2017
Renneti	De Plotting Shed	Tombstone
2016
Value At Risk	Marchese Marconi	Dedigout
2015
Dedigout	Thousand Stars	Analifet
2014
Thousand Stars	Get Me Out Of Here	Upsie
2013
Dressedtothenines	Zaidpour	Si C'etait Vrai
2012
Get Me Out Of Here	Tofino Bay	Oilily
2011
Voler La Vedette	Blackstairmountain	Oscar Dan Dan

The Rathbarry & Glenview Studs Hurdle is a Grade 2 National Hunt hurdle race in Ireland which is open to horses aged five years or older. It is run at Fairyhouse over a distance of 2 miles and 4 furlongs (4,023 metres), and it is scheduled to take place each year at the Easter meeting.

The race was first run in 2011. It was sponsored by Keelings fruit growers until the 2019 running and in 2021 by Underwriting Exchange. Since 2022 the sponsors are Rathbarry & Glenview Studs.

== Records ==
Leading jockey (3 wins):

- Paul Townend - Thousand Stars (2014), Coquin Mans (2018), Asterion Forlonge (2023)

Leading trainer (5 wins):

- Willie Mullins - Thousand Stars (2014), Renneti (2017), Coquin Mans (2018), Stormy Ireland (2021), Asterion Forlonge (2023)

== Winners ==
Year	Winner	Age	Jockey	Trainer
2011	Voler La Vedette	7	Andrew Lynch	Colm Murphy
2012	Get Me Out Of Here	8	Tony McCoy	Jonjo O'Neill
2013	Dressedtothenines	6	Tony McCoy	Edward P Harty
2014	Thousand Stars	10	Paul Townend	Willie Mullins
2015	Dedigout	9	Paul Carberry	Tony Martin
2016	Value At Risk	7	Harry Skelton	Dan Skelton
2017	Renneti	8	Ruby Walsh	Willie Mullins
2018	Coquin Mans	6	Paul Townend	Willie Mullins
2019	Rashaan	7	Davy Russell	Colin Kidd
	no race 2020 (Note: The 2020 running was cancelled because of the COVID-19 pandemic in the Republic of Ireland)
2021	Stormy Ireland	7	Danny Mullins	Willie Mullins
2022	Darasso	9	Mark Walsh	Joseph O'Brien
2023	Asterion Forlonge	9	Paul Townend	Willie Mullins
2024	Brewin'upastorm	11	Jack Kennedy	Olly Murphy
2025	Maxxum	8	Danny Gilligan	Gordon Elliot
2026	Slade Steel	8	Darragh O'Keeffe	Henry de Bromhead

== See also ==
- Horse racing in Ireland
- List of Irish National Hunt races
