= Weatherbys Ireland EBF Mares Bumper =

National Hunt flat horse race in Ireland

Weatherbys Ireland Mares Bumper
2026
Even Tho	Celestial Tune	Coole Cafe

Previous years
2025
Carrigmoornaspruce	Seo Linn	Divaboriva
2024
Familiar Dreams	Mozzies Sister	Aurora Vega
2023
Junta Marvel	Rhaenyra	Cuta Des As
2022
The Model Kingdom	Beyond Ambitious	Battling Bessie
2021
Grangee	Choice Of Words	Glan

2020–2016
2019
Gypsy Island	Daylight Katie	Minella Melody
2018
Colreevy	Black Tears	Tintangle
2017
Minutestomidnight	Mystic Theatre	Bluegrass Princess
2016
Augusta Kate	Forge Meadow	Glens Harmony

The Weatherbys Ireland EBF Mares Bumper is a Grade 3 National Hunt flat race in Ireland for amateur riders which is open to mares and fillies aged four to seven years. It is run at Punchestown over a distance of about 2 miles and ½ furlong (2 miles and 70 yards, or 3,283 metres), and it is scheduled to take place each year during the Punchestown Festival in late April or early May.

The race (also known as the Liss A Paoraigh EBF Bumper) was first run as a Listed race in 2016. From 2017, the race was awarded Group 3 status, and all penalties were abolished thus making it a mares' equivalent of the Champion INH Flat Race.

== Records ==
Most successful jockey (3 wins):

- Patrick Mullins - Augusta Kate (2016), Colreevy (2018), Grangee (2021)

Most successful trainer (5 wins):

- Willie Mullins – Augusta Kate (2016), Colreevy (2018), Grangee (2021), Junta Marvel (2023), Even Tho (2026)

== Winners ==
Year	Winner	Age	Jockey	Trainer
2016	Augusta Kate	5	Patrick Mullins	Willie Mullins
2017	Minutestomidnight	6	Jamie Codd	Jonathan Sweeney
2018	Colreevy	5	Patrick Mullins	Willie Mullins
2019	Gypsy Island	5	Derek O'Connor	Peter Fahey
	no race 2020 (Note: The 2020 running was cancelled because of the COVID-19 pandemic in the Republic of Ireland)
2021	Grangee	5	Patrick Mullins	Willie Mullins
2022	The Model Kingdom	5	Pat Taaffe	Noel Meade
2023	Junta Marvel	5	Jody Townend	Willie Mullins
2024	Familiar Dreams	5	Aine O'Connor	Anthony McCann
2025	Carrigmoornaspruce	5	Declan Queally	Declan Queally
2026	Even Tho	5	Jody Townend	Willie Mullins

== See also ==
- Horse racing in Ireland
- List of Irish National Hunt races
