= Ballybrit Racecourse =

Horse racing venue in County Galway, Ireland

Coordinates: 53.298°N 8.997°W

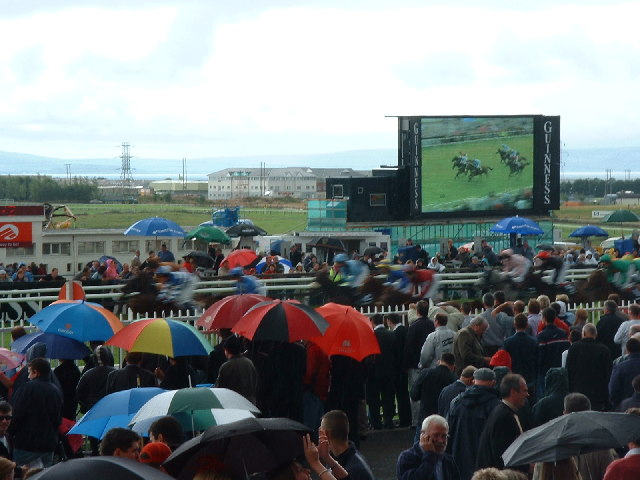
Ballybrit Racecourse

Ballybrit Race Track, also known as Galway Racecourse, is a horse race course in County Galway, Ireland. It is located in the townland of Ballybrit, in the environs of Castlegar, just north of the N6 Bóthar na dTreabh, c.6 km northeast of Galway city.

The track has two stands, the Main, or Killanin Stand and Millennium Stand.

The seven-day Galway Races Festival are held there every August.

Other meetings are held here in September (2 days), early October (1 day) and over the last weekend in October (3 days).

== Course information ==
Ballybrit is a right-handed course of about one mile and three furlongs, with a steep decline into the dip where the last two fences are situated. There is a sharp incline to the finish line.

The Millennium Stand replaced the (then main) Corrib stand in 1999. The Corrib was thought to have the longest bar in the world. The Main, Killanin or West stand was opened in 2007. Its terrace can hold 7,000 people, including seating for 700. It replaced a previous West stand constructed in 1972.

In November 2024, the course received permission from An Bord Pleanála for the addition of new temporary stables and ancillary buildings. Permission would become permanent pending the finalisation of the plans for the Galway City Ring Road.

== History ==
The first meeting was held in 1869.

As part of his visit to Ireland in 1979, Pope John Paul II celebrated mass at the racecourse for two hundred and eighty thousand people. The then Mayor of Galway, Michéal Ó hUiginn, conferred the Freedom of Galway upon the Pontiff.

In 2021, during the COVID-19 pandemic in Ireland, the racecourse was used as a mass vaccination centre.

== Notable races ==
Month	DOW	Race Name	Type	Grade	Distance	Age/Sex
July/Aug	Wednesday	Galway Plate	Chase	Handicap	2m 6f	4yo +
July/Aug	Thursday	Galway Hurdle	Hurdle	Handicap	2m	4yo +
October	Sunday	Ballybrit Novice Chase	Chase	Grade 3	2m 1f	4yo +
