= O'Driscoll's Irish Whiskey Juvenile Hurdle =

Hurdle horse race in Ireland

Tayto Hurdle
2026
Proactif	Macho Man	Majolique

Previous years
2025
Blue Lemons	Its Bilbo	Wendrock
2024
Bottler'secret	Karl Des Tourelles	Miss Manzor
2023
Enjoy The Dream	Blood Destiny	Gust Of Wind
2022
Iberique Du Seuil	Innatendue	Icare Allen
2021
Jeff Kidder	Teahupoo	Scholastic

2020-2011
2019
French Made	Gardens of Babylon	Coeur Sublime
2018
Saglawy	Mitchouka	Saldier
2017
Project Bluebook	Dandy Mag	Ex Patriot
2016
Slowmotion	Rashaan	Newberry New
2015
Buiseness Sivola	Prussian Eagle	Sam Red
2014
Ivan Grozny	Kitten Rock	Lindenhurst
2013
One Fine Day	Djakadam	Dogora
2012
Ballynacree	Gorgeous Sixty	Cops And Robbers
2011
Twinlight	Rocky Wednesday	Rigidity

2010-2003
2010
Fingal Rock	Big Game Hunter	Doctor Deejay
2009
The Fist Of God	Coffee Tea Or Me	Flag Of Honour
2008
Paco Jack	Miss Fancy Pants	C'est Ca
2007
Bahrain Storm	Financial Reward	Phantom Lad
2006
Artist's Muse	Summer Soul	Valley Of Giants
2005
Levitator	Tous Les Tables	Hurricane Alley
2004
Essex	Definate Spectacle	Cupla Cairde
2003
Dashing Home	Harchibald	Caishill

The Donohue Marquees Juvenile Hurdle is a Grade 2 National Hunt novice hurdle race in Ireland which is open to horses aged four years only. It is run at Fairyhouse over a distance of 2 miles (3,218 metres), and it is scheduled to take place each year at the course's Easter Festival.

The race was awarded Grade 3 status in 2008, later raised to Grade 2 in 2016. Prior to 2015 it was sponsored by Tayto, and in 2015 and 2016 it was sponsored by R E A Grimes Property Consultants. The sponsors of the 2017 and 2018 runnings were Avoca Handweavers and from 2019 to 2021 the race was sponsored by the Rathbarry and Glenview Studs. Since 2022 the sponsors are Donohue Marquees.

== Records ==
Leading jockey since 1988 (4 wins):

- Paul Carberry – Micks Delight (1994), Embellished I (1996), Dashing Home (2003), The Fist Of God (2009)
- Ruby Walsh - Balla Sola (1999), Artist's Muse (2006), Twinlight (2011), French Made (2019)
- Paul Townend - Ivan Grozny (2014), .Buiseness Sivola (2015), Saglawy (2018), Blue Lemons (2025)

Leading trainer since 1988 (8 wins):

- Noel Meade - Rocket Dancer (1990), Visions Pride (1991), Glencloud (1992), Micks Delight (1994), Embellished I (1996), Dashing Home (2003), The Fist Of God (2009), Jeff Kidder (2021)
- Willie Mullins - Balla Sola (1999), Twinlight (2011), Ivan Grozny (2014), Buiseness Sivola (2015), Saglawy (2018), Blue Lemons (2025), Proactif (2026)

== Winners since 1988 ==
Year	Winner	Jockey	Trainer
1988	Marvellous Marvin	Tommy Carmody	John Mulhern
1989	First Fought	Ken Morgan	Jim Dreaper
1990	Rocket Dancer	Tommy Carmody	Noel Meade
1991	Visions Pride	Tommy Carmody	Noel Meade
1992	Glencloud	Charlie Swan	Noel Meade
1993	Judicial Field	Adrian Maguire	Dermot Weld
1994	Micks Delight	Paul Carberry	Noel Meade
1995	Bobstar Dancer	John Shortt	J G Coogan
1996	Embellished I	Paul Carberry	Noel Meade
1997	Stylish Allure	Richard Dunwoody	Dermot Weld
1998	Shantarini	Kieran Gaule	Shane Donohoe
1999	Balla Sola	Ruby Walsh	Willie Mullins
2000	Wild Arms	Norman Williamson	Edward O'Grady
2001	Rostropovich	David Casey	Mouse Morris
2002	Hyderabad	David Casey	Mouse Morris
2003	Dashing Home	Paul Carberry	Noel Meade
2004	Essex	Davy Russell	Michael O'Brien
2005	Levitator	T G M Ryan	Michael O'Brien
2006	Artist's Muse	Ruby Walsh	Ted Walsh
2007	Bahrain Storm	Davy Russell	Patrick J Flynn
2008	Paco Jack	Davy Russell	Joseph Crowley
2009	The Fist Of God	Paul Carberry	Noel Meade
2010	Fingal Rock	Andrew McNamara	Peter Casey
2011	Twinlight	Ruby Walsh	Willie Mullins
2012	Ballynacree	Tony McCoy	Christy Roche
2013	One Fine Day	Robbie Power	Jessica Harrington
2014	Ivan Grozny	Paul Townend	Willie Mullins
2015	Buiseness Sivola	Paul Townend	Willie Mullins
2016	Slowmotion	Barry Geraghty	Aidan O'Brien
2017	Project Bluebook	Barry Geraghty	John Quinn
2018	Saglawy (Note: the 2018 race took place in mid-April after the original fixture was abandoned due to waterlogging)	Paul Townend	Willie Mullins
2019	French Made	Ruby Walsh	Willie Mullins
	no race 2020 (Note: The 2020 race was cancelled due to the COVID-19 pandemic in the Republic of Ireland)
2021	Jeff Kidder	Sean Flanagan	Noel Meade
2022	Iberique Du Seuil	Jack Kennedy	Gordon Elliott
2023	Enjoy The Dream	Darragh O'Keeffe	Andrew McNamara
2024	Bottler'secret	Keith Donoghue	Gavin Cromwell
2025	Blue Lemons	Paul Townend	Willie Mullins
2026	Proactif	Mark Walsh	Willie Mullins

== See also ==
- Horse racing in Ireland
- List of Irish National Hunt races
