= Grimes Hurdle =

Hurdle horse race in Ireland

Grimes Hurdle
2026
| Run For Oscar | Daddy Long Legs | Queenofthelodge |

Previous years
2025
Jesse Evans | Enniskerry | Sunchart
2024
Winter Fog | Shecouldbeanything | Minx Tiara
2023
Fils D'oudairies | Sharjah | Cash Back
2022
Santa Rossa | Sole Pretender | Saint Roi
2021
Sole Pretender | Darasso | Modus

2020-2011
2020
Aramon | Petit Mouchoir | Wonder Laish
2019
Thomas Hobson | Band of Outlaws | Like An Open Book
2018
Joey Sasa | Wicklow Brave | Sharjah
2017
Plinth | Kitten Rock | Ivan Grozny
2016
Ivan Grozny | Sempre Medici | Tocororo
2015
Diakali | Thousand Stars | Mrs Mac Veale
2014
Simenon | Darwins Fox | Little King Robin
2013
Silk Hall | Steps To Freedom | Fosters Cross
2012
Rebel Fitz | Captain Cee Bee | The Real Article
2011
Captain Cee Bee | The Real Article | De Valira

2010-2001
2010
Bahrain Storm | Cuan Na Grai | Cooper's Crest
2009
Jumbo Rio | Cuan Na Grai | Fosters Cross
2008
Larkwing | Definate Spectacle | Jubilant Note
2007
Essex | Star Wood | Al Eile
2006
Red Square Lady | Callow Lake | Chicago Vic
2005
Accordion Etoile | Red Square Lady | Calorando
2004
Accordion Etoile | Grimes | Risk Accessor
2003
Risk Accessor | Goss | Carolina
2002
Timber King | Hat Or Halo | Sharpaten
2001
Grimes | Balla Sola | Tryphaena

The Grimes Hurdle is a Grade 3 National Hunt novice hurdle race in Ireland which is open to horses aged four years or older. It is run at Tipperary over a distance of 2 miles (3,218 metres), and it is scheduled to take place each year in July.

The race was first run in 2001 (as the Betdaq Hurdle) and was awarded Grade 3 status in 2006.

In line with several races at Tipperary, the race is named (since 2006) after a horse owned by J. P. McManus, Grimes, who won the inaugural running of this race. The same horse, Grimes, was previously celebrated (2003) in the name of the Tipperary race now known as the Like A Butterfly Novice Chase.

The race is sponsored by the company owned by J. P. McManus's younger brother, Kevin McManus Bookmakers.

== Records ==
Most successful horse (2 wins):

- Accordion Etoile – 2004, 2005

Leading jockey (4 wins):

- Paul Townend – Simenon (2014), Thomas Hobson (2019), Aramon (2020), Sole Pretender (2021)

Leading trainer (6 wins):

- Willie Mullins – Simenon (2014), Diakali (2015), Ivan Gronzy (2016), Thomas Hobson (2019), Aramon (2020), Winter Fog (2024)

== Winners ==
| Year | Winner | Age | Jockey | Trainer |
|---|---|---|---|---|
| 2001 | Grimes | 8 | Charlie Swan | Christy Roche |
| 2002 | Timber King | 6 | Paul Moloney | Christy Roche |
| 2003 | Risk Accessor | 8 | Mr A P Crowe | Christy Roche |
| 2004 | Accordion Etoile | 5 | John Cullen | Paul Nolan |
| 2005 | Accordion Etoile | 6 | John Cullen | Paul Nolan |
| 2006 | Red Square Lady | 8 | Andrew McNamara | M J Phillips |
| 2007 | Essex | 7 | Andrew Lynch | Michael O'Brien |
| 2008 | Larkwing | 7 | Barry Geraghty | E McNamara |
| 2009 | Jumbo Rio | 4 | Andrew McNamara | Edward O'Grady |
| 2010 | Bahrain Storm | 7 | J R Barry | Patrick J Flynn |
| 2011 | Captain Cee Bee | 10 | Tony McCoy | Edward P Harty |
| 2012 | Rebel Fitz | 7 | Davy Russell | Michael Winters |
| 2013 | Silk Hall | 8 | E J O'Connell | J J Lambe |
| 2014 | Simenon | 7 | Paul Townend | Willie Mullins |
| 2015 | Diakali | 6 | Ruby Walsh | Willie Mullins |
| 2016 | Ivan Grozny | 6 | Ruby Walsh | Willie Mullins |
| 2017 | Plinth | 7 | Jody McGarvey | Joseph O'Brien |
| 2018 | Joey Sasa | 9 | Sean Flanagan | Noel Meade |
| 2019 | Thomas Hobson | 9 | Paul Townend | Willie Mullins |
| 2020 | Aramon (Note: The 2020 race was run in June due to the COVID-19 pandemic in the Republic of Ireland) | 7 | Paul Townend | Willie Mullins |
| 2021 | Sole Pretender | 7 | Paul Townend | Norman Lee |
| 2022 | Santa Rossa | 8 | Darragh O'Keeffe | Dermot McLoughlin |
| 2023 | Fils D'oudairies | 8 | Jack Kennedy | Gordon Elliott |
| 2024 | Winter Fog | 10 | Brian Hayes | Willie Mullins |
| 2025 | Jesse Evans | 9 | Donagh Meyler | Noel Meade |
| 2026 | Run For Oscar | 11 | Danny Mullins | Charles Byrnes |

== See also ==
- Horse racing in Ireland
- List of Irish National Hunt races
