= 2016 Grand National =

169th running of the Grand National horse race

- Grand National
- Location: Aintree Racecourse
- Date: 9 April 2016
- Winning horse: (United Kingdom) Rule The World
- Starting price: 33/1
- Jockey: (Republic of Ireland) David Mullins
- Trainer: (Republic of Ireland) Mouse Morris
- Owner: (Republic of Ireland) Gigginstown House Stud
- Conditions: Soft (heavy in places)

External videos
- Full replay of the 2016 Grand National Racing TV, YouTube

The 2016 Grand National (officially known as the 2016 Crabbie's Grand National for sponsorship reasons) was the 169th annual running of the Grand National horse race at Aintree Racecourse near Liverpool, England. The showpiece steeplechase took place on 9 April 2016, the final day of a three-day meeting. A field of 39 runners competed for a share of a prize fund of £1 million.

The 2016 National was won by 33/1 shot Rule The World, ridden by David Mullins and trained by Mouse Morris. In second place was the 8/1 joint-favourite The Last Samuri. Sixteen of the 39 runners completed the race, held on the softest going since the 2001 race.

The race was sponsored by ginger-beer producer Crabbie's for the third and final time. It was broadcast live on television by Channel 4 for the fourth year running and the final time; the TV rights moved to ITV in 2017. There was live radio coverage by BBC Radio, which has held the radio rights since 1927, and by Talksport, which covered the main race live for the third time.

== Race card ==
A total of 126 entries were received for consideration in the 2016 Grand National, of which 96 remained after the second of two scratching deadlines, and 87 then advanced to the final confirmation stage. On 7 April the final field of 40 horses was announced as starters for the showpiece race. Four reserves were on standby, but there were no withdrawals before the deadline on 8 April.

O'Faolains Boy was subsequently a non-runner, being declared lame in the morning of the race, reducing the field to 39 from the maximum of 40. A notable absentee was the 2014 winner Pineau de Re, who was rated 46th in the handicap and thus did not qualify for the final field. The joint-favourites with bookmakers were the 2015 winner and top-weight Many Clouds and The Last Samuri.

No	Horse	Age	Handicap (st–lb)	SP	Jockey	Trainer
1	Many Clouds (IRE)	9	11–10	8/1 JF	Leighton Aspell	Oliver Sherwood
2	Silviniaco Conti (FR)	10	11–08	12/1	Noel Fehily	Paul Nicholls
3	First Lieutenant (IRE)	11	11–04	50/1	Bryan Cooper	Mouse Morris (IRE)
4	Wonderful Charm (FR)	8	11–03	40/1	Sam Twiston-Davies	Paul Nicholls
5	Ballynagour (IRE)	10	11–02	50/1	Tom Scudamore	David Pipe
6	O'Faolains Boy (IRE)	9	11–01	NR	Brian Hughes	Rebecca Curtis
7	Gilgamboa (IRE)	8	11–01	28/1	Robbie Power	Enda Bolger (IRE)
8	On His Own (IRE)	12	11–01	33/1	Mr. Patrick Mullins	Willie Mullins (IRE)
9	The Druids Nephew (IRE)	9	11–00	16/1	Denis O'Regan	Neil Mulholland
10	Triolo d'Alene (FR)	9	11–00	50/1	Jeremiah McGrath	Nicky Henderson
11	Rocky Creek (IRE)	10	10–13	66/1	Andrew Thornton	Paul Nicholls
12	Sir Des Champs (FR)	10	10–13	20/1	Ms. Nina Carberry	Willie Mullins
13	Holywell (IRE)	9	10–12	11/1	Richie McLernon	Jonjo O'Neill
14	Shutthefrontdoor (IRE)	9	10–11	12/1	Barry Geraghty	Jonjo O'Neill
15	Soll	11	10–11	40/1	Conor O'Farrell	David Pipe
16	Buywise (IRE)	9	10–10	33/1	Paul Moloney	Evan Williams
17	Boston Bob (IRE)	11	10–10	25/1	Paul Townend	Willie Mullins
18	Aachen	12	10–10	50/1	Henry Brooke	Venetia Williams
19	Morning Assembly (IRE)	9	10–09	16/1	Davy Russell	Pat Fahy (IRE)
20	Double Ross (IRE)	10	10–09	80/1	Ryan Hatch	Nigel Twiston-Davies
21	Goonyella (IRE)	9	10–08	12/1	Johnny Burke	Jim Dreaper (IRE)
22	Ucello Conti (FR)	8	10–08	25/1	Daryl Jacob	Gordon Elliott (IRE)
23	Unioniste (FR)	8	10–08	28/1	Nick Scholfield	Paul Nicholls
24	Le Reve (IRE)	8	10–08	50/1	Harry Skelton	Lucy Wadham
25	Gallant Oscar (IRE)	10	10–08	16/1	Mark Walsh	Tony Martin (IRE)
26	Onenightinvienna (IRE)	7	10–08	33/1	Tom O'Brien	Philip Hobbs
27	The Last Samuri (IRE)	8	10–08	8/1 JF	David Bass	Kim Bailey
28	Kruzhlinin (GER)	9	10–07	33/1	Richard Johnson	Philip Hobbs
29	Rule The World	9	10–07	33/1	David Mullins	Mouse Morris
30	Just a Par (IRE)	9	10–06	40/1	Sean Bowen	Paul Nicholls
31	Katenko (FR)	10	10–06	40/1	Will Kennedy	Venetia Williams
32	Vics Canvas (IRE)	13	10–06	100/1	Robert Dunne	Dermot McLoughlin (IRE)
33	Black Thunder (FR)	9	10–06	50/1	Mr. Sam Waley-Cohen	Paul Nicholls
34	Ballycasey (IRE)	9	10–06	50/1	Ms. Katie Walsh	Willie Mullins
35	Hadrian's Approach (IRE)	9	10–06	50/1	Nico de Boinville	Nicky Henderson
36	Vieux Lion Rouge (FR)	7	10–05	66/1	James Reveley	David Pipe
37	Pendra (IRE)	8	10–05	50/1	Aidan Coleman	Charles Longsdon
38	Saint Are (FR)	10	10–05	16/1	Paddy Brennan	Tom George
39	Home Farm (IRE)	9	10–04	50/1	Andrew Lynch	Henry de Bromhead (IRE)
40	The Romford Pele (IRE)	9	10–04	33/1	Trevor Whelan	Rebecca Curtis

- Great Britain unless stated.
- Amateur jockeys denoted by preceding title, e.g. Mr.

== Race overview ==
The outsider Aachen led the field on the first circuit with Double Ross very prominent and The Last Samuri and Many Clouds close behind the leaders. The most notable early faller was the third-favourite Holywell at the second fence. The Romford Pele was in a handy position until falling at the Canal Turn. Silviniaco Conti was pulled up at the 14th whilst On His Own and Sir Des Champs, both trained by Willie Mullins, fell at The Chair.

As the horses set out on the second circuit some of the early leaders began to fade and the 2015 runner-up Saint Are led the field, with The Last Samuri and Many Clouds disputing second. In the heavy conditions, several riders decided to pull their horses up rather than face Becher's a second time. Many Clouds went to the front at the 19th fence and raced alongside The Last Samuri for several fences before making a bad mistake at the 26th, after which he began to struggle under the top weight.

The Last Samuri led the field into the final turn ahead of Morning Assembly and the 100/1 outsider Vics Canvas, who had made a remarkable recovery after almost falling at Becher's Brook on the first circuit. Rule The World was beginning to make steady progress. The Last Samuri cleared the final fence just ahead of Vics Canvas, with Rule The World a length behind in third place. The three leaders were virtually level at the elbow with Vics Canvas on the rail, Rule The World on the outside and The Last Samuri in between them. In the final furlong Rule The World drew ahead and won by six lengths from The Last Samuri, with eight lengths back to Vics Canvas in third. Gilgamboa finished another two lengths behind in fourth, ahead of Goonyella, Ucello Conti, Vieux Lion Rouge, Morning Assembly and Shutthefrontdoor. Many Clouds was the last of the 16 finishers.

All 39 runners returned to the stables with no major concerns. However, over the three days of the Grand National Festival a total of five horses died from injuries sustained during racing.

== Finishing order ==
Placed horses

1: Rule The World

2: The Last Samuri

3: Vics Canvas

4: Gilgamboa

The sixteen horses to complete the course finished as follows:

Position	Horse	Jockey	SP	Distance	Prize money
1	Rule The World	David Mullins	33/1	6 lengths	£561,300
2	The Last Samuri	David Bass	8/1 JF	8 lengths	£211,100
3	Vics Canvas	Robert Dunne	100/1	2 lengths	£105,500
4	Gilgamboa	Robbie Power	28/1	19 lengths	£52,700
5	Goonyella	Johnny Burke	12/1	1 3/4 lengths	£26,500
6	Ucello Conti	Daryl Jacob	25/1	11 lengths	£13,200
7	Vieux Lion Rouge	James Reveley	66/1	14 lengths	£6,800
8	Morning Assembly	Davy Russell	16/1	1/2 length	£3,600
9	Shutthefrontdoor	Barry Geraghty	12/1	9 lengths	£2,000
10	Unioniste	Nick Scholfield	28/1	5 lengths	£1,000
11	Le Reve	Harry Skelton	50/1	7 lengths	
12	Buywise	Paul Moloney	33/1	A distance	
13	Pendra	Aidan Coleman	50/1	14 lengths	
14	Triolo d'Alene	Jeremiah McGrath	50/1	20 lengths	
15	Just a Par	Sean Bowen	40/1	1 length	
16	Many Clouds	Leighton Aspell	8/1 JF	Last to complete	

== Non-finishers ==
The runners who failed to complete were as follow:

Fence	Horse	Jockey	SP	Fate
1	Hadrian's Approach	Nico de Boinville	50/1	Unseated rider
2	First Lieutenant	Bryan Cooper	50/1	Fell
2	Holywell	Richie McLernon	11/1	Fell
8 (Canal Turn)	The Romford Pele	Trevor Whelan	33/1	Unseated rider
12 (ditch)	Rocky Creek	Andrew Thornton	33/1	Pulled up
14	Silviniaco Conti	Noel Fehily	12/1	Pulled up
15 (The Chair)	On His Own	Mr. Patrick Mullins	33/1	Fell
15 (The Chair)	Sir Des Champs	Ms. Nina Carberry	20/1	Fell
18	Gallant Oscar	Mark Walsh	16/1	Unseated rider
19 (open ditch)	Ballynagour	Tom Scudamore	50/1	Unseated rider
21	Soll	Conor O'Farrell	40/1	Pulled up
21	The Druids Nephew	Denis O'Regan	16/1	Pulled up
21	Home Farm	Andrew Lynch	50/1	Pulled up
21	Black Thunder	Mr. Sam Waley-Cohen	50/1	Pulled up
22 (Becher's Brook)	Katenko	Will Kennedy	40/1	Fell
22 (Becher's Brook)	Onenightinvienna	Tom O'Brien	33/1	Unseated rider
22 (Becher's Brook)	Boston Bob	Paul Townend	25/1	Pulled up
22 (Becher's Brook)	Aachen	Henry Brooke	50/1	Pulled up
24 (Canal Turn)	Wonderful Charm	Sam Twiston-Davies	40/1	Pulled up
26	Double Ross	Ryan Hatch	80/1	Pulled up
27 (open ditch)	Kruzhlinin	Richard Johnson	33/1	Pulled up
29	Ballycasey	Ms. Katie Walsh	50/1	Unseated rider
30	Saint Are	Paddy Brennan	16/1	Pulled up

== Broadcasting and media ==
The Last Samuri just leads the way in the National, but here comes Rule The World charging on the outside, then Vics Canvas, and Rule The World is beginning to get up on the nearside now, charging on in the hands of David Mullins. And racing up towards the line, Rule The World rules at Aintree and wins the Crabbie's Grand National!

— Channel 4 lead commentator Simon Holt describes the climax of the race.

As the Grand National is accorded the status of an event of national interest in the United Kingdom and is listed on the Ofcom Code on Sports and Other Listed and Designated Events, it must be shown on free-to-air terrestrial television in the UK. The race was broadcast live on TV by Channel 4, as part of their four-year deal for the race secured back in 2012. This was the final year that Channel 4 broadcast the race live, after ITV secured the rights from 2017 onwards.

The coverage was led by Clare Balding and Nick Luck, supported by Emma Spencer, Jim McGrath and Graham Cunningham in the trackside studio. Retired champion jockey Sir Anthony McCoy provided expert opinions throughout the coverage, with reports from Mick Fitzgerald and Alice Plunkett and betting updates by Tanya Stevenson and Brian Gleeson. The commentary team was by Richard Hoiles, Ian Bartlett and Simon Holt, who called the winner home for the final time. After the race, Luck, Fitzgerald and McCoy provided viewers with a fence-by-fence analysis of the race. Channel 4 ran all-day coverage from Aintree on the day of the race, with extended editions of The Morning Line and Weekend Brunch airing prior to the main broadcast. The coverage of the race was watched by 10 million viewers, an increase of 1.1 million on the previous year, and attracted a 59% share of the television audience.

== See also ==
- Horse racing in Great Britain
- List of British National Hunt races
