= Fairyhouse Racecourse =

Horse racing venue in Ireland

Coordinates: 53°28′48.59″N 6°27′40.83″W

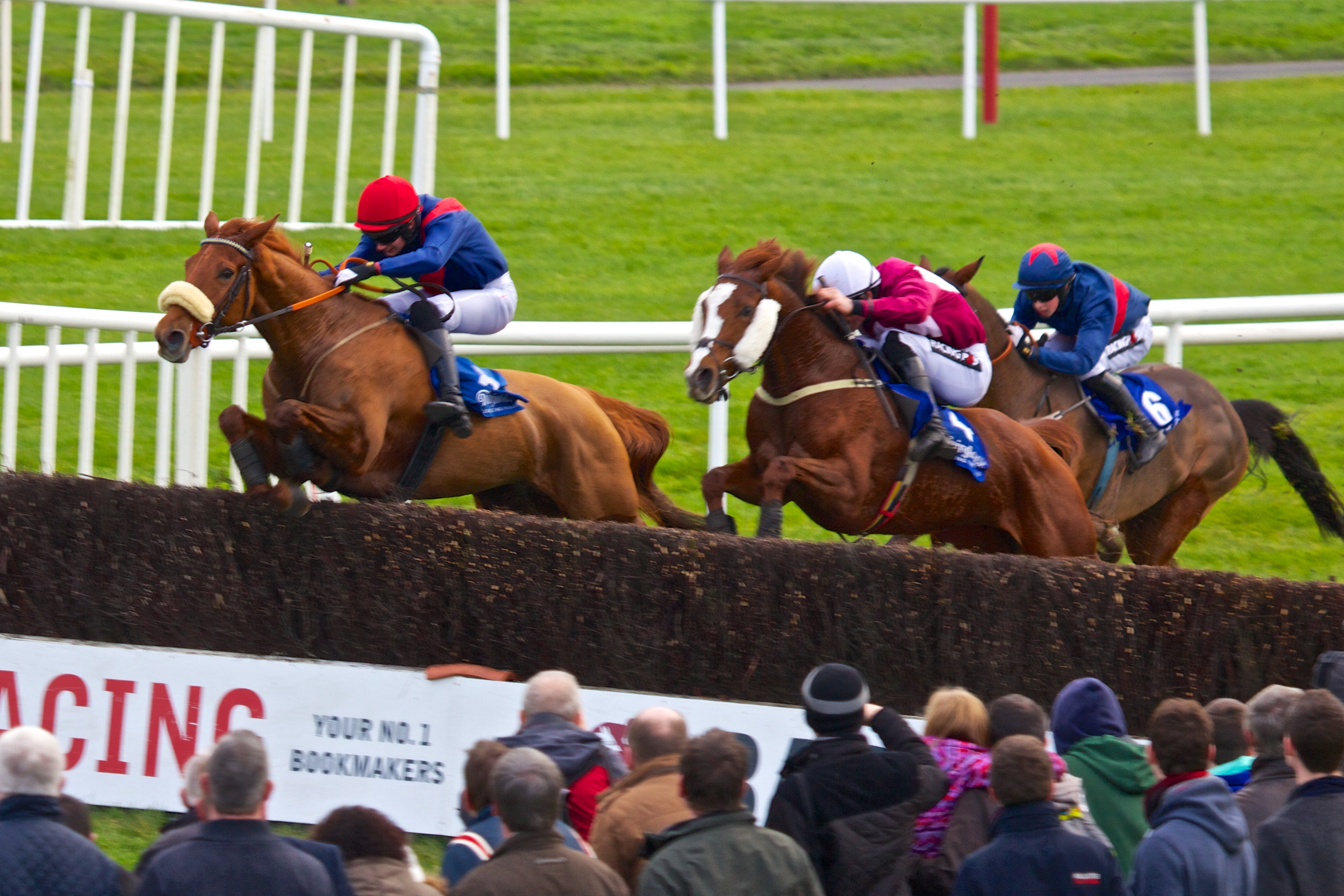
- Horse Racing at Fairyhouse, 2013
- Interactive map of Fairyhouse Racecourse
- Location: Ratoath, County Meath, Ireland
- Date opened: 1848
- Course type: Mixed
- Notable races: Irish Grand National

Fairyhouse Racecourse is a horse racing venue in Ireland. It is situated in the parish of Ratoath in County Meath, on the R155 regional road, 3 kilometres (2 mi) off the N3. It hosted its first race in 1848 and since 1870 has been the home of the Irish Grand National steeplechase.

The racetrack itself is a one-mile and 6.5 furlong right-handed circuit, with a 2.5 furlong straight and a slight uphill finish. The main business of Fairyhouse racecourse is betting on the races known traditionally in parts of Ireland as turf accountancy. Admission to Fairyhouse race meetings is free to under-16s along with various other promotions such as concession rates for OAPs and seasonal festivals (i.e. Winter Festival, Easter Festival etc.) It also hosted the first three Witnness music festivals from 2000 to 2002 inclusive.

== Significance ==
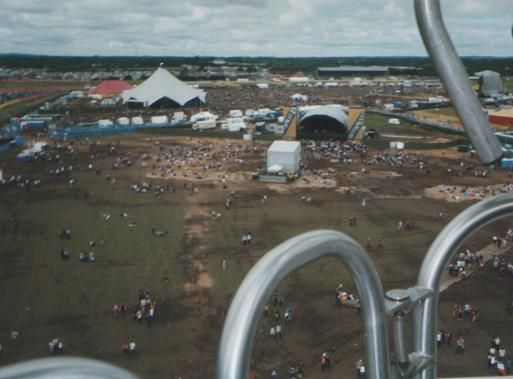
Fairyhouse hosting the Witnness music festival in 2002

Fairyhouse hosts both the Irish Grand National and Irish Gold Cup and races have featured Desert Orchid, Prince Regent, and Persian War among others. The course was the training ground for l'Escargot, a winner of the Irish Grand National against famous racer Red Rum. The Powers Gold Label Stand and Jameson stand were reopened following refurbishment in 1999 and Fairyhouse is described by Meath Tourism to be "firmly established as one of the most modern facilities in the country, providing an outstanding level of comfort and service." The Irish Grand National is run every Easter Monday and currently sponsored by Jameson Whiskey.

== Managerial ==
Fairyhouse is owned by Horse Racing Ireland (HRI) and was managed by Doneraile man Dick Sheil, a graduate of Warrenstown Agricultural College and UCD from 1999 until October 2006, one year after ownership passed hands from Fairyhouse Club LTD owing to financial difficulties. HRI viewed Dick Sheil as a tremendous asset to the course having brokered considerable sponsorship and managing many major meetings. The course was overseen by a caretaker manager for almost a year and on 1 October 2007 the position was filled by chartered accountant Caroline Gray who had worked for the HRI finance department for five years previously and was described as an "innovator" by HRI. The Powers Whiskey sponsorship is backed up by the Irish branch of Pernod Ricard, a sponsorship existing since 1960 and the longest sponsorship in Irish racing. Fairyhouse General Manager Caroline Gray credits this sponsorship for making the Irish Grand National what it is today but the term is due to end in April 2010 and future sponsor is currently uncertain. Wet weather often affects Fairyhouse and Ireland had been experiencing the worst flooding on record in 2009.

== Notable races ==
Month	DOW	Race Name	Type	Grade	Distance	Age/Sex
January	Sunday	Solerina Mares Novice Hurdle	Hurdle	Grade 3	2m 2f	4yo + m
February	Saturday	Bobbyjo Chase	Chase	Grade 2	3m 1f	5yo +
February	Saturday	Winning Fair Juvenile Hurdle	Hurdle	Grade 2	2m	4yo only
Easter	Sunday	WillowWarm Gold Cup	Chase	Grade 1	2m 4f	5yo +
Easter	Sunday	Mares Novice Hurdle Championship Final	Hurdle	Grade 1	2m 4f	4yo + m
Easter	Sunday	Festival Novice Hurdle	Hurdle	Grade 2	2m 4f	4yo +
Easter	Monday	Rathbarry & Glenview Studs Hurdle	Hurdle	Grade 2	2m 4f	5yo +
Easter	Monday	Dunboyne Castle Novice Hurdle	Hurdle	Grade 2	2m	4yo +
Easter	Monday	John and Chich Fowler Memorial Mares Chase	Chase	Grade 3	2m 4f	5yo + m
Easter	Monday	Donohue Marquees Juvenile Hurdle	Hurdle	Grade 3	2m	4yo only
Easter	Monday	Irish Grand National	Chase	Handicap	3m 5f	5yo +
July	Wednesday	Brownstown Stakes	Flat	Group 3	7f	3yo + f
December	Sunday	Royal Bond Novice Hurdle	Hurdle	Grade 1	2m	4yo +
December	Sunday	Hatton's Grace Hurdle	Hurdle	Grade 1	2m 4f	4yo +
December	Sunday	Bar One Racing Juvenile Hurdle	Hurdle	Grade 3	2m	3yo only
December	Sunday	Drinmore Novice Chase	Chase	Grade 1	2m 4f	4yo +

== Non-racing events ==
On a Sunday, when there are no race meetings, Fairyhouse opens as a market selling local produce ranging from saddlery and tools to fresh vegetables, arts and crafts products and even electrical goods. The market also accommodates car boot sales. The course is also a premier venue for musical events and festivals.
