= Listowel Racecourse =

Horse racing venue in Listowel, Ireland

Listowel Racecourse is a horse racing venue in the town of Listowel, County Kerry, Ireland which stages both National Hunt and Flat racing. The course is flat and run left handed over an inner rectangular shaped circuit measuring just over a mile, and a triangular outer circuit of a mile and a furlong. There is a chute for the 7 furlong and 1 mile races. The current racecourse which is close to the town centre first opened in 1858 and celebrated its 150th anniversary in 2008.

== Festival ==
Listowel's largest race festival, known as the Harvest Festival and originally known as the North Kerry Hunt Steeplechase Meeting, takes place each year in September. It is run over seven days with both national hunt and flat races taking place. It is the final festival to take place in the summer, the last before Christmas and second only to the Galway Races in attendances.

== Guinness Kerry National ==
The most valuable race run at Listowel is the Guinness Kerry National. It is run on the Wednesday of the Harvest Festival over a distance of 3 miles and worth €200,000 in prize money. Previous winners include the Aintree Grand National winner Monty's Pass.
