= Like A Butterfly Novice Chase =

Steeplechase horse race in Ireland

Like A Butterfly Novice Chase
2025
Gold Dancer	Downmexicoway	Pied Piper

Previous years
2024
Shecouldbeanything	Gaelic Arc	Music Of Tara
2023
Sharjah	Captain Conby	Watch House Cross
2022
Authorized Art	Ash Tree Meadow	Max Flamingo
2021
Gin On Lime	Fan De Blues	Busselton

2020-2011
2020
Galvin	Waitnsee	Boro Tari
2019
Robin De Carlow	Put The Kettle On	Moon Over Germany
2018
Le Richebourg	Robin Des Foret	The Last Marju
2017
Rathvinden	Ask Nile	The West's Awake
2016
Westerner Lady	Deans Road	Full Cry
2015
The Game Changer	Rule The World	Viconte Du Noyer
2014
Indevan	Silver Tassie	Rough Justice
2013
Rebel Fitz	Owega Star	Clar Na Mionn
2012
Pride Of The Artic	Jacksonslady	Aughnacurraveel
2011
First Lieutenant	Slieveardagh	Imperial Shabra

2010-2001
2010
Beau Michael	Gonebeyondrecall	Glenstal Abbey
2009
Archie Boy	Wins Now	Emmpat
2008
Baltiman	Footy Facts	Boulavogue
2007
French Accordion	Cool Running	Corrieann
2006
Openide	Rights Of Man	One Cool Cookie
2005
Church Island	Waltons Mountain	Mamouna Gale
2004
Mirpour	Kickham	Always
2003
Catalpa Cargo	Colca Canyon	Find The King
2002
Doesheknow	Minella Leisure	Cluain Rua
2001
Wicked Crack	Native Performance	Tisrabraq

2000-1997
2000
Limestone Lad	Sackville	Shannon Gale
1999
Its Time For A Win	Shannon Gale	Nervous Kate
1997
Private Peace	Macnamarasband	Garrys Lock

The Like A Butterfly Novice Chase is a Grade 3 National Hunt novice chase in Ireland which is open to horses aged four years or older. It is run at Tipperary over a distance of about 2 miles and 4 furlongs (4,023 metres), and it is scheduled to take place each year in October.

The race was first run in 1997 and was awarded Grade 3 status in 2003.

In line with several races at Tipperary, the race is named after a horse owned by J. P. McManus, his Irish Champion Hurdle winning mare, Like-A-Butterfly. The race was previously named after another J. P. McManus owned horse, Grimes.

The race was sponsored for many years by the company owned by J. P. McManus's younger brother, Kevin McManus Bookmakers.

== Records ==
Leading jockey (6 wins):

- Ruby Walsh – Doesheknow (2002), Mirpour (2004), Indevan (2014), The Game Changer (2015), Westerner Lady (2016), Rathvinden (2017)

Leading trainer (8 wins):

- Willie Mullins – Its Time For A Win (1999), Indevan (2014), Westerner Lady (2016), Rathvinden (2017), Robin De Carlow (2019), Authorized Art (2022), Sharjah (2023), Gold Dancer (2025)

== Winners ==
Year	Winner	Age	Jockey	Trainer
1997	Private Peace		Richard Dunwoody	Aidan O'Brien
1998	no race 1998
1999	Its Time For A Win	7	Jason Titley	Willie Mullins
2000	Limestone Lad (Note: The 2000 running took place at Cork)	8	Barry Cash	James Bowe
2001	Wicked Crack	8	Conor O'Dwyer	Edward U Hales
2002	Doesheknow	7	Ruby Walsh	P Fahy
2003	Catalpa Cargo	9	Conor O'Dwyer	Christy Roche
2004	Mirpour	5	Ruby Walsh	Eoin Griffin
2005	Church Island	6	Denis O'Regan	Michael Hourigan
2006	Openide	5	Davy Russell	B W Duke
2007	French Accordion	7	J L Cullen	Paul Nolan
2008	Baltiman	6	T J Doyle	Miss Susan A Finn
2009	Archie Boy	7	Davy Russell	Paul W Flynn
2010	Beau Michael	6	Barry Geraghty	Adrian McGuinness
2011	First Lieutenant	6	Davy Russell	Mouse Morris
2012	Pride Of The Artic	7	A D Leigh	Peter Fahey
2013	Rebel Fitz	8	Barry Geraghty	Michael Winters
2014	Indevan	6	Ruby Walsh	Willie Mullins
2015	The Game Changer	6	Ruby Walsh	Gordon Elliott
2016	Westerner Lady	6	Ruby Walsh	Willie Mullins
2017	Rathvinden	9	Ruby Walsh	Willie Mullins
2018	Le Richebourg	5	Barry Geraghty	Joseph O'Brien
2019	Robin De Carlow	6	David Mullins	Willie Mullins
2020	Galvin	6	Davy Russell	Gordon Elliott
2021	Gin On Lime	5	Robbie Power	Henry De Bromhead
2022	Authorized Art	7	Danny Mullins	Willie Mullins
2023	Sharjah	10	Paul Townend	Willie Mullins
2024	Shecouldbeanything	7	Sam Ewing	Gordon Elliott
2025	Gold Dancer	6	Paul Townend	Willie Mullins
2026	Frankie John	6	Daniel King	Denis Hogan

== See also ==
- Horse racing in Ireland
- List of Irish National Hunt races
