= Shutthefrontdoor =

Irish racehorse

- Foaled: 2007
- Country: Ireland
- Trainer: Jonjo O'Neill

Major wins
- Irish Grand National (2014)

Shutthefrontdoor is a racehorse that won the Irish Grand National in 2014. Ridden by Barry Geraghty and starting at odds of 8/1, he finished 3/4 lengths clear of Golden Wonder. Shutthefrontdoor finished fifth in the 2015 Grand National and ninth in the 2016 Grand National.
