= Local Authority Accommodation =

Public housing system in Ireland

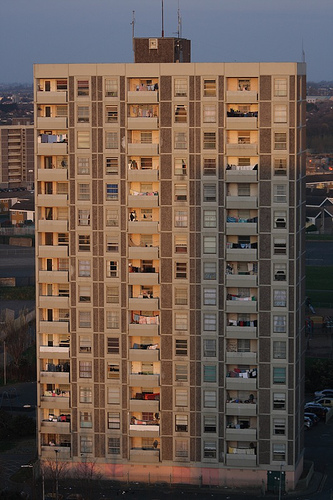
Tower in Ballymun as of April 2007

Local authority accommodation is the name given to a form of public housing provided in Ireland by various county and city councils. In Dublin, the most notable and visible example of local authority accommodation were the Ballymun Flats.

Estates of houses have been built around the country at various stages, typically to strict standards.

In 2006, the Irish Government budgeted just over €1 billion for social housing needs.
