= Ballybrit Novice Chase =

Steeplechase horse race in Ireland

Ballybrit Novice Chase
2026
Shadow Paddy	Lady Bluebird	Soir De Garde

Previous years
2025
Gold Dancer	Westport Cove	Intellotto
2024
Ashdale Bob	Saylavee	Horantzau D'airy
2023
Hercule Du Seuil	Solness	Ballyadam
2022
Visionarian	Call Me Lyreen	Champagne Gold
2021
Fan De Blues	Gin On Lime	Bold Enough

2020-2011
2020
Polished Steel	My Manekineko	Dime A Dozen
2019
Wicklow Brave	Jan Maat	Make My Heart Fly
2018
Rashaan	Ornua	Robin Des Foret
2018
Rashaan	Ornua	Robin Des Foret
2017
Rathvinden	Potters Point	Peregrine Run
2016
Tocororo	Tiger Roll	Baily Cloud
2015
Rock The World	The Game Changer	Upazo
2014
Alelchi Inois	Definite Ruby	Shake The Bucket
2013
Shrapnel	Clar Na Mionn	Six Stone Ned
2012
Twinlight	Argocat	Aughnacurraveel
2011
Sweeps Hill	Regal D'estruval	Foildubh

2010-2001
2010
Head Of The Posse	Son Of Oscar	Salesin
2009
Fosters Cross	Schelm	Barna Bay
2008
Holly Tree	Coolpotts	Abbeybraney
2007
Drunken Disorderly	Abbeybraney	Escrea
2006
Vic Venturi	Conna Castle	Vintage Treasure
2005
Arteea	Top Strategy	Only two finished
2004
Sir Oj	Kickham	Present Abbey
2003
Golden Row	Quadco	Pro Dancer
2001
Michael Mor	Ellenjay	Sparkling Gold

2000-1997
2000
Sunset Lodge	Northern Galaxy	No Stranger
1999
Quinze	Go Roger Go	More Than A Stroll
1997
Hill Society	Lucky Town	Greenflag Princess

The Ballybrit Novice Chase is a Grade 3 National Hunt chase in Ireland which is open to horses aged four years or older. The race is run at Galway Racecourse, over a distance of 2 miles and 1 furlong (3,419 metres).

The race was run in early September from 2014 to 2016, having been moved from its previous date at the end of October as part of the changes made to the Irish Pattern for 2014/15. Since 2017 it has been run in August.

The race was first run in 1997 and was awarded Grade 3 status in 2002.

== Records ==
Most successful jockey (4 wins):

- David Casey – Drunken Disorderly (2007), Holly Tree (2008), Head Of The Posse (2010), Sweeps Hill (2011)
- Paul Townend - Alelchi Inois (2014), Rathvinden (2017), Wicklow Brave (2019), Fan De Blues (2021)

Most successful trainer (7 wins):

- Willie Mullins – Twinlight (2012), Alelchi Inois (2014), Rathvinden (2017), Wicklow Brave (2019), Fan De Blues (2021), Hercule Du Seuil (2023), Gold Dancer (2025)

== Winners ==
Year	Winner	Age	Jockey	Trainer
1997	Hill Society		Paul Carberry	Noel Meade
1998	no race 1998
1999	Quinze	6	Paul Carberry	Patrick Hughes
2000	Sunset Lodge	8	P P O'Brien	Charles Byrnes
2001	Michael Mor	7	Barry Geraghty	Noel Meade
2002	no race 2002
2003	Golden Row	9	Barry Geraghty	Edward O'Grady
2004	Sir Oj	7	Paul Carberry	Noel Meade
2005	Arteea	6	Andrew McNamara	Michael Hourigan
2006	Vic Venturi	6	Andrew McNamara	Philip Fenton
2007	Drunken Disorderly	7	David Casey	Charlie Swan
2008	Holly Tree	8	David Casey	Eamon Sheehy
2009	Fosters Cross	7	Davy Russell	Thomas Mullins
2010	Head Of The Posse	7	David Casey	John E Kiely
2011	Sweeps Hill	8	David Casey	John E Kiely
2012	Twinlight	5	Ruby Walsh	Willie Mullins
2013	Shrapnel	7	Davy Russell	Gordon Elliott
2014	Alelchi Inois	6	Paul Townend	Willie Mullins
2015	Rock The World	7	Barry Geraghty	Jessica Harrington
2016	Tocororo	4	Jack Kennedy	Gordon Elliott
2017	Rathvinden	9	Paul Townend	Willie Mullins
2018	Rashaan	6	Davy Russell	Colin Thomas Kidd
2019	Wicklow Brave	10	Paul Townend	Willie Mullins
2020	Polished Steel	6	Robbie Power	Jessica Harrington
2021	Fan De Blues	6	Paul Townend	Willie Mullins
2022	Visionarian	7	Denis O'Regan	Peter Fahey
2023	Hercule Du Seuil	6	Mark Walsh	Willie Mullins
2024	Ashdale Bob	9	Jack Kennedy	Jessica Harrington
2025	Gold Dancer	6	Sean O'Keeffe	Willie Mullins
2026	Shadow Paddy	6	Gary Noonan	Eoin McCarthy

== See also ==
- Horse racing in Ireland
- List of Irish National Hunt races
