= Ballybrit =

Area of Galway city, Ireland

Coordinates: 53°17′47″N 8°59′44″W

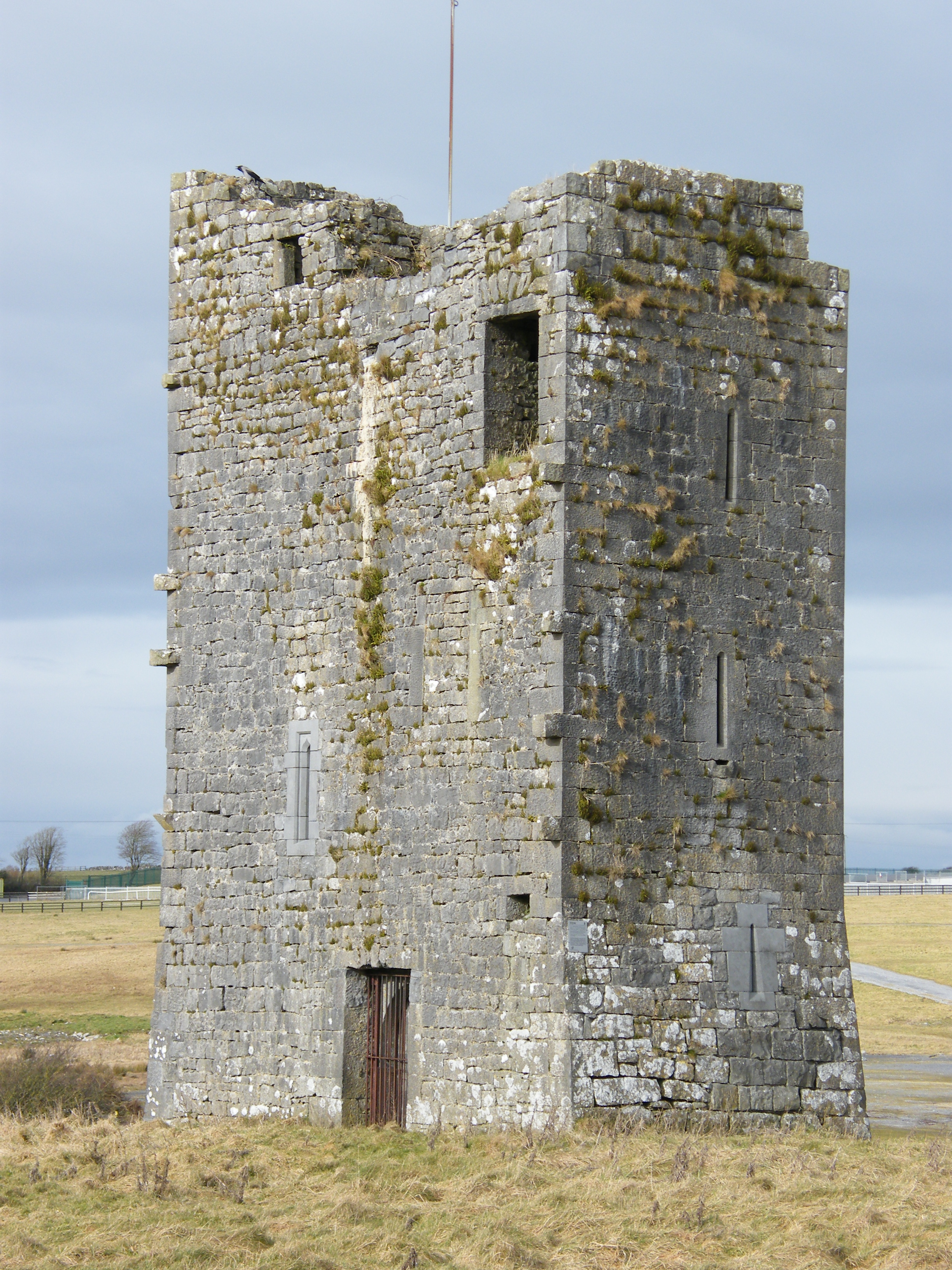
The tower house of Ballybrit Castle lies within the loop of Ballybrit Racecourse

Ballybrit (Irish: Baile an Bhriotaigh) is an electoral division and townland in Galway city, Ireland. It is around 4 km north-east of the city centre, in the civil parish of St. Nicholas. The townland of Ballybrit is 2.5 square kilometres (1 sq mi) in area, and is home to Ballybrit Racecourse and a business park. Evidence of ancient settlement in the area includes a medieval tower house and an earlier ringfort site. The ringfort (or cashel) was used as a graveyard since at least the early 19th century.

== See also ==
- List of townlands of County Galway
