= Hugh McMahon Memorial Novice Chase =

Irish National Hunt annual steeplechase

Hugh McMahon Memorial Novice Chase
2025
Fun Fun Fun	Harry Des Ongrais	Lonesome Boatman

Previous years
2024
Favori De Champdou	Donacheady Gale	Bella Bliss
2023
Thedevilscoachman	Grandero Bello	Life In The Park
2022
Lifetime Ambition	Darrens Hope	Egality Mans
2021
Chatham Street Lad	Defi Bleu	Full Time Score

2020-2011
2019
Burrows Saint	Robin Des Foret	Roaring Bull
2018
Kemboy	Tombstone	Twiss's Hill
2017
General Principle	Twiss's Hill	All Hell Let Loose
2016
Avant Tout	Lord Scoundrel	The Housekeeper
2015
Val De Ferbet	Rule The World	Bishops Road
2014
Touch The Eden	Letter Of Credit	Folsom Blue
2013
Argocat	Shabra Charity	Only two finished
2012
Frisco Depot	Your Busy	Ordinary Man
2011
Mr Cracker	Western Charmer	Pontiac

2010-2003
2010
Caim Hill	Across The Bay	Barna Bay
2009
Bluesea Cracker	Top Of The Rock	Raven's Run
2008
Candy Girl	Drunken Disorderly	Oscar Honey
2007
Offshore Account	Laetitia	Mercuric
2006
Oodachee	Vic Ville	Slim Pickings
2005
Scarthy Lad	Lincam	Pearly Jack
2004
Hi Cloy	Lord Who	Carneys Cross
2003
Jenniferjo	I'vehadit	Lord Of The Turf

The Hugh McMahon Memorial Novice Chase is a Grade 3 National Hunt novice steeplechase in Ireland which is open to horses aged five years or older. It is run at Limerick over a distance of about 3 miles (4,828 metres), and during its running there are 16 fences to be jumped. It is scheduled to take place each year in late March or early April.

The race was awarded Grade 3 status in 2007 and raised to Grade 2 status the following year.

== Records ==
Leading jockey (5 wins):

- Ruby Walsh - Scarthy Lad (2005), Candy Girl (2008), Val De Ferbet (2015), Avant Tout (2016), Burrows Saint (2019)

Leading trainer (7 wins):

- Willie Mullins - Candy Girl (2008), Touch The Eden (2014), Val De Ferbet (2015), Avant Tout (2016), Kemboy (2018), Burrows Saint (2019), Fun Fun Fun (2025)

== Winners since 2003 ==
Year	Winner	Age	Jockey	Trainer
2003	Jenniferjo	6	David Casey	P A Fahy
2004	Hi Cloy	7	R M Moran	Michael Hourigan
2005	Scarthy Lad	7	Ruby Walsh	Thomas Gerard O'leary
2006	Oodachee	7	Davy Russell	Charlie Swan
2007	Offshore Account	7	David Casey	Charlie Swan
2008	Candy Girl	9	Ruby Walsh	Willie Mullins
2009	Bluesea Cracker	7	Andrew McNamara	J Motherway
2010	Caim Hill	7	B T O'Connell	Philip Fenton
2011	Mr Cracker	6	Paul Heskin	Michael Hourigan
2012	Frisco Depot	8	Bryan Cooper	Dessie Hughes
2013	Argocat	5	Bryan Cooper	Tom Taaffe
2014	Touch The Eden	7	Paul Townend	Willie Mullins
2015	Val De Ferbet	6	Ruby Walsh	Willie Mullins
2016	Avant Tout	6	Ruby Walsh	Willie Mullins
2017	General Principle	8	Bryan Cooper	Gordon Elliott
2018	Kemboy	6	Paul Townend	Willie Mullins
2019	Burrows Saint	6	Ruby Walsh	Willie Mullins
	no race 2020
2021	Chatham Street Lad	9	Darragh O'Keeffe	Michael Winters
2022	Lifetime Ambition	7	Robbie Power	Jessica Harrington
2023	Thedevilscoachman	7	Denis O'Regan	Noel Meade
2024	Favori De Champdou	9	Jack Kennedy	Gordon Elliott
2025	Uhavemeinstitches	7	Paul Townend	Willie Mullins
2026	Uhavemeinstitches	6	Mark Walsh	James Motherway

== See also ==
- Horse racing in Ireland
- List of Irish National Hunt races
