= Naas Racecourse =

Horse racing venue in Ireland

Coordinates: 53.2193°N 6.6476°W

Naas Racecourse is a horse racing venue in Naas, County Kildare, Ireland, approximately 18 miles from Dublin. The course stages both Flat racing and National Hunt racing and in 2010 fifteen race meetings were held there.

The Naas Races Company was formed in 1922 and the first meeting at the course was held on 19 June 1924. The course is left-handed with an uphill finish and a long run-in.

Naas stages several Grade Two National Hunt races, including the Slaney Novice Hurdle, Nas Na Riogh Novice Chase and the Johnstown Novice Hurdle, and one Group Three flat race, the Blue Wind Stakes. Another flat race, the Fillies' Sprint Stakes, held Group Three status from 2006 to 2010.

Amongst horses that have taken part in races at Naas are Ragusa, the 1963 Irish Derby and Eclipse Stakes winner, and Arkle, winner of the Cheltenham Gold Cup in 1964, 1965 and 1966.

== Notable races ==
Month	DOW	Race Name	Type	Grade	Distance	Age/Sex
January	Sunday	Lawlor's of Naas Novice Hurdle	Hurdle	Grade 1	2m 4f	5yo +
January	Saturday	Naas Racecourse Business Club Novice Chase	Chase	Grade 3	3m	5yo +
January	Saturday	Limestone Lad Hurdle	Hurdle	Grade 3	2m 3f	5yo +
February	Sunday	Newlands Chase	Chase	Grade 2	2m	5yo +
February	Sunday	Nas Na Riogh Novice Chase	Chase	Grade B	2m 4f	5yo +
February	Sunday	Johnstown Novice Hurdle	Hurdle	Grade 2	2m	4yo +
March	Sunday	Naas Directors Plate Novice Chase	Chase	Grade 3	2m 4f	5yo +
March	Sunday	Leinster National	Chase	Listed	3m ½f	5yo +
May	Wednesday	Blue Wind Stakes	Flat	Group 3	1m 2f	3yo + f
June	Monday	Fillies' Sprint Stakes	Flat	Listed	6f	2yo only f
Oct / Nov	Monday	Poplar Square Chase	Chase	Grade 3	2m	5yo +
November	Saturday	Fishery Lane Hurdle	Hurdle	Grade 3	2m	4yo only
