= David Mullins (jockey) =

National Hunt jockey (born 1996)

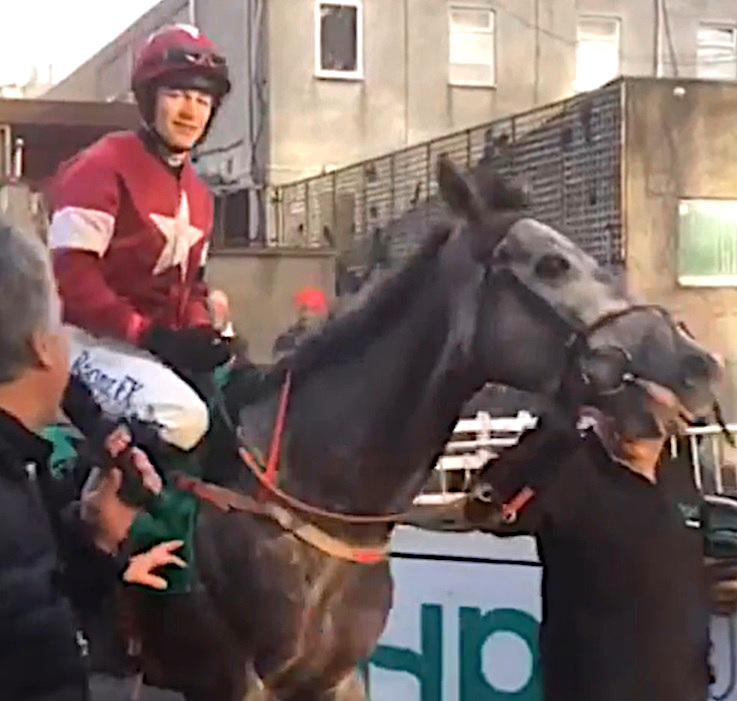
- Mullins on Petit Mouchoir, Irish Champion Hurdle 2017

Personal information
- Born: 6 June 1996 (age 30) Goresbridge, County Kilkenny
- Occupation: Jockey

Horse racing career
- Sport: Horse racing

Major racing wins
- Morgiana Hurdle (2015); Grand National (2016)

Significant horses
- Nichols Canyon, Rule The World

David James Mullins (born 6 June 1996) is a former National Hunt jockey. He is the son of Tom Mullins and grandson of Paddy Mullins. He was one of the retained jockeys for his uncle, the multiple Irish champion trainer Willie Mullins.

== Career ==
Mullins became involved with horse racing at the age of 15 and quickly gained fame in only his second year of riding at 19 years old when he was still claiming a 3 pounds allowance as a conditional jockey. In that first part of the 2015/16 National Hunt campaign he recorded his first major successes for his uncle Willie Mullins, initially winning a Grade 2 event on board of Devis Bride. Shortly after that he obtained his first Grade 1 victory when taking the Morgiana Hurdle in a tactical affair on board of Nichols Canyon, producing the surprise of the season by defeating the champion hurdler Faugheen who was unbeaten at the time. During the same season he continued to win more Graded races for other trainers such as Ms Sandra Hughes and Pat A. Fahy and culminated with a victory for Mouse Morris in the most valuable race of the Jumps calendar, the 2016 Grand National at only his first attempt, giving a patient ride to Rule The World, a horse which had never previously won a steeplechase. He became one of the youngest jockeys ever to win the race and declared: →"It's a weird feeling, you don't really believe it" →"I beat Faugheen on Nichols Canyon but I think this tops that". The only younger jockey to claim the Grand National was the 17-year-old Bruce Hobbs back in 1938.

Mullins retired from the saddle in January 2021 at the age of 24. His intention was to become a buyer and seller of horses. In November 2024, Mullins purchased the horse Kindly Prince for £320,000 at the Goffs Coral Gold Cup Sale, Newbury.

== Major wins ==
(Republic of Ireland) Ireland

- Champion Stayers Hurdle -(1) Faugheen (2018)
- Dublin Chase -(1) Min (2018)
- Greenmount Park Novice Chase -(1) Outlander (2015)
- Herald Champion Novice Hurdle -(1) Cilaos Emery (2017)
- Irish Champion Hurdle -(1) Petit Mouchoir (2017)
- Mares Novice Hurdle Championship Final -(1) Augusta Kate (2017)
- Morgiana Hurdle -(1) Nichols Canyon (2015)
- Paddy Power Future Champions Novice Hurdle -(1) Whiskey Sour (2017)
- Punchestown Gold Cup -(1) Bellshill (2018)
- Ryanair Gold Cup -(1) Al Boum Photo (2018)
- Savills Chase -(1) Kemboy (2018)
