= Arkle Novice Chase =

Steeplechase horse race in Ireland

Arkle Novice Chase
2026
Romeo Coolio	Kargese	Downmexicoway

Previous years
2025
Majborough	Touch Me Not	Firefox
2024
Il Etait Temps	Found A Fifty	Facile Vega
2023
El Fabiolo	Banbridge	Appreciate It
2022
Blue Lord	Riviere D'etel	Saint Sam
2021
Energumene	Franco De Port	Blackbow

2020-2011
2020
Notebook	Cash Back	Gallant John Joe
2019
Le Richebourg	Us And Them	Mengli Khan
2018
Footpad	Footpad	Any Second Now
2017
Some Plan	Finished alone
2016
Douvan	Velvet Maker	Domesday Book
2015
Un De Sceaux	Clarcam	Gilgamboa
2014
Trifolium	Felix Yonger	Mozoltov
2013
Benefficient	Oscars Well	Arvika Ligeonniere
2012
Flemenstar	Gift Of Dgab	Notus De La Tour
2011
Realt Dubh	Noble Prince	Mr Cracker

2010-2001
2010
An Cathaoir Mor	Sports Line	Take The Breeze
2009
Golden Silver	Forpadydeplasterer	Follow The Plan
2008
Thyne Again	Gardasee	Savitha
2007
Schindlers Hunt	King Johns Castle	Khetaam
2006
Missed That	Arteea	Justified
2005
Ulaan Baatar	Foreman	Ned Kelly
2004
Kicking King	Central House	Colca Canyon
2003
Bust Out	Native Scout	Rathgar Beau
2002
Assessed	Phariwarmer	Mantles Prince
2001
Well Ridden	Ross Moff	Alcapone

2000-1991
2000
Frozen Groom	Rathbawn Prince	Commanche Court
1999
His Song	Padre Mio	Cockney Lad
1998
Private Peace	Mr Baxter Basics	Moses Prey
1997
Mulligan	Beakstown	Penndara
1996
Manhattan Castle	Double Symphony	Blazing Spectacle
1995
Klairon Davis	Winter Belle	Coq Hardi Affair
1994
Atone	Belvederian	Bucks-Choice
1993
Soft Day	How's The Boss	Killiney Graduate
1992
General Idea	Second Schedual	Bishops Staff
1991
Garamycin	Toranfield	Firions Law

1990-1988
1990
On The Other Hand	Larchmont	Dutch Royal
1989
Abbenoir	Feroda	Rosenaire
1988
Wolf Of Badenoch	Friendly Saint	Flying Ferret

The Arkle Novice Chase is a Grade 1 National Hunt steeplechase in Ireland which is open to horses aged five years or older. It is run at Leopardstown over a distance of about 2 miles and 1 furlong (3,420 metres), and during its running there are eleven fences to be jumped. The race is for novice chasers, and it is scheduled to take place each year in late January.

The earliest version of the event was established in 1956, and it was originally contested over 2 miles (3,219 metres). Its current title pays tribute to Arkle, a winner of this race in 1963. At the time of Arkle's victory the event was known as the Milltown Novice Chase. The distance was extended by 2 furlongs in 1980, and by another furlong in 1992. It was cut to its present length in 1995.

The race is sometimes referred to as the "Irish Arkle", as there is a different event, similar in both name and format, which takes place in Great Britain in March. Several winners of the Irish version have subsequently achieved victory in its British counterpart, the Arkle Challenge Trophy. The most recent of these is El Fabiolo in 2023.

== Records ==
Leading jockey since 1956 (4 wins):

- Frank Berry - Spanish Tan (1975), Siberian Sun (1977), Bobsline (1984), Barrow Line (1987)
- Paul Townend - Golden Silver (2009), Footpad (2018), Energumene (2021), Blue Lord (2022)

Leading trainer since 1956 (11 wins):

- Willie Mullins - Assessed (2002), Missed That (2006), Golden Silver (2009), Un de Sceaux (2015), Douvan (2016), Footpad (2018), Energumene (2021), Blue Lord (2022), El Fabiolo (2023), Il Etait Temps (2024), Majborough (2025)

== Winners ==
Year	Winner	Age	Jockey	Trainer
1956	Quita Que	7	P. J. Doyle	Dan Moore
1957	Proud Charger		Toss Taaffe	Vincent O'Brien
1958	Casamba		Bobby Beasley	Paddy Sleator
1959	The Major		Bobby Beasley	Paddy Sleator
1960	Kilrory		F. Prendergast (Note: amateur jockey)	J. J. Prendergast
1961	Gallant Grey		E. D. Delany	E. Delany
1962	Limeking	5	Timmy Hyde	Danny Morgan
1963	Arkle	6	Pat Taaffe	Tom Dreaper
1964	Fort Leney	6	Paddy Woods	Tom Dreaper
1965	Flyingbolt	6	Pat Taaffe	Tom Dreaper
1966	Thorn Gate	7	Pat Taaffe	Tom Dreaper
1967	Stonehaven	7	Sean Barker	Tom Dreaper
1968	Herring Gull	6	Joe Crowley	Paddy Mullins
1969	Kings Sprite	7	P. Black	Georgie Wells
	no race 1970
1971	Dim Wit	6	Matt Curran	Paddy Mullins
1972	Ormond King		Ben Hannon	C. J. Powell
1973	Good Review	7	Val O'Brien	Jim Dreaper
1974	Ten Up	7	Tommy Carberry	Jim Dreaper
1975	Spanish Tan	8	Frank Berry	Francis Flood
1976	Troubled Times	7	Dessie Hughes	Peter McCreery
1977	Siberian Sun	6	Frank Berry	Francis Flood
1978	Kilmakillogue	9	Niall Madden	Edward O'Grady
1979	Chinrullah	7	Dessie Hughes	Mick O'Toole
1980	Anaglogs Daughter	7	Martin Mulligan	Bill Durkan
1981	Light the Wad	8	Frank Leavy	Dessie Hughes
1982	Sean Ogue	6	P. Walsh	Michael O'Brien
1983	Pearlstone	7	Tony Mullins	Paddy Mullins
1984	Bobsline	8	Frank Berry	Francis Flood
1985	Buck House	7	Tommy Carmody	Mouse Morris
1986	Passage Creeper	9	Ken Morgan	Jim Dreaper
1987	Barrow Line	10	Frank Berry	Pat Hughes
1988	Wolf of Badenoch	7	Tommy Carmody	John Mulhern
1989	Abbenoir	7	R. Byrne	Francis Flood
1990	On the Other Hand	7	Tommy Carmody	John Mulhern
1991	Garamycin	9	Brendan Sheridan	Willie Deacon
1992	General Idea	7	Brendan Sheridan	Dermot Weld
1993	Soft Day	8	Tom Taaffe	Arthur Moore
1994	Atone	7	Kevin O'Brien	Bunny Cox
1995	Klairon Davis (Note: The 1995 running took place at Fairyhouse)	6	Francis Woods	Arthur Moore
1996	Manhattan Castle	7	Francis Woods	Arthur Moore
1997	Mulligan	7	Adrian Maguire	David Nicholson
1998	Private Peace	8	Charlie Swan	Aidan O'Brien
1999	His Song	6	Shay Barry	Mouse Morris
2000	Frozen Groom	5	Paul Carberry	Noel Meade
2001	Well Ridden	7	Conor O'Dwyer	Arthur Moore
2002	Assessed	8	Ruby Walsh	Willie Mullins
2003	Bust Out	7	Barry Geraghty	Jessica Harrington
2004	Kicking King	6	Barry Geraghty	Tom Taaffe
2005	Ulaan Baatar	8	Timmy Murphy	Jessica Harrington
2006	Missed That	7	David Casey	Willie Mullins
2007	Schindlers Hunt	7	Roger Loughran	Dessie Hughes
2008	Thyne Again	7	Davy Russell	Liam Burke
2009	Golden Silver	7	Paul Townend	Willie Mullins
2010	An Cathaoir Mor	7	David Casey	Henry de Bromhead
2011	Realt Dubh	7	Paul Carberry	Noel Meade
2012	Flemenstar	7	Andrew Lynch	Peter Casey
2013	Benefficient	7	Bryan Cooper	Tony Martin
2014	Trifolium	7	Bryan Cooper	Charles Byrnes
2015	Un de Sceaux	7	Ruby Walsh	Willie Mullins
2016	Douvan	6	Ruby Walsh	Willie Mullins
2017	Some Plan	9	Davy Russell	Henry de Bromhead
2018	Footpad	6	Ruby Walsh	Willie Mullins
2019	Le Richebourg	6	Mark Walsh	Joseph O'Brien
2020	Notebook	7	Rachael Blackmore	Henry De Bromhead
2021	Energumene	7	Paul Townend	Willie Mullins
2022	Blue Lord	7	Paul Townend	Willie Mullins
2023	El Fabiolo	6	Daryl Jacob	Willie Mullins
2024	Il Etait Temps	6	Danny Mullins	Willie Mullins
2025	Majborough	5	Mark Walsh	Willie Mullins
2026	Romeo Coolio	7	Jack Kennedy	Gordon Elliott

== See also ==
- Horse racing in Ireland
- List of Irish National Hunt races
