= Arkle Challenge Trophy =

Steeplechase horse race in Britain

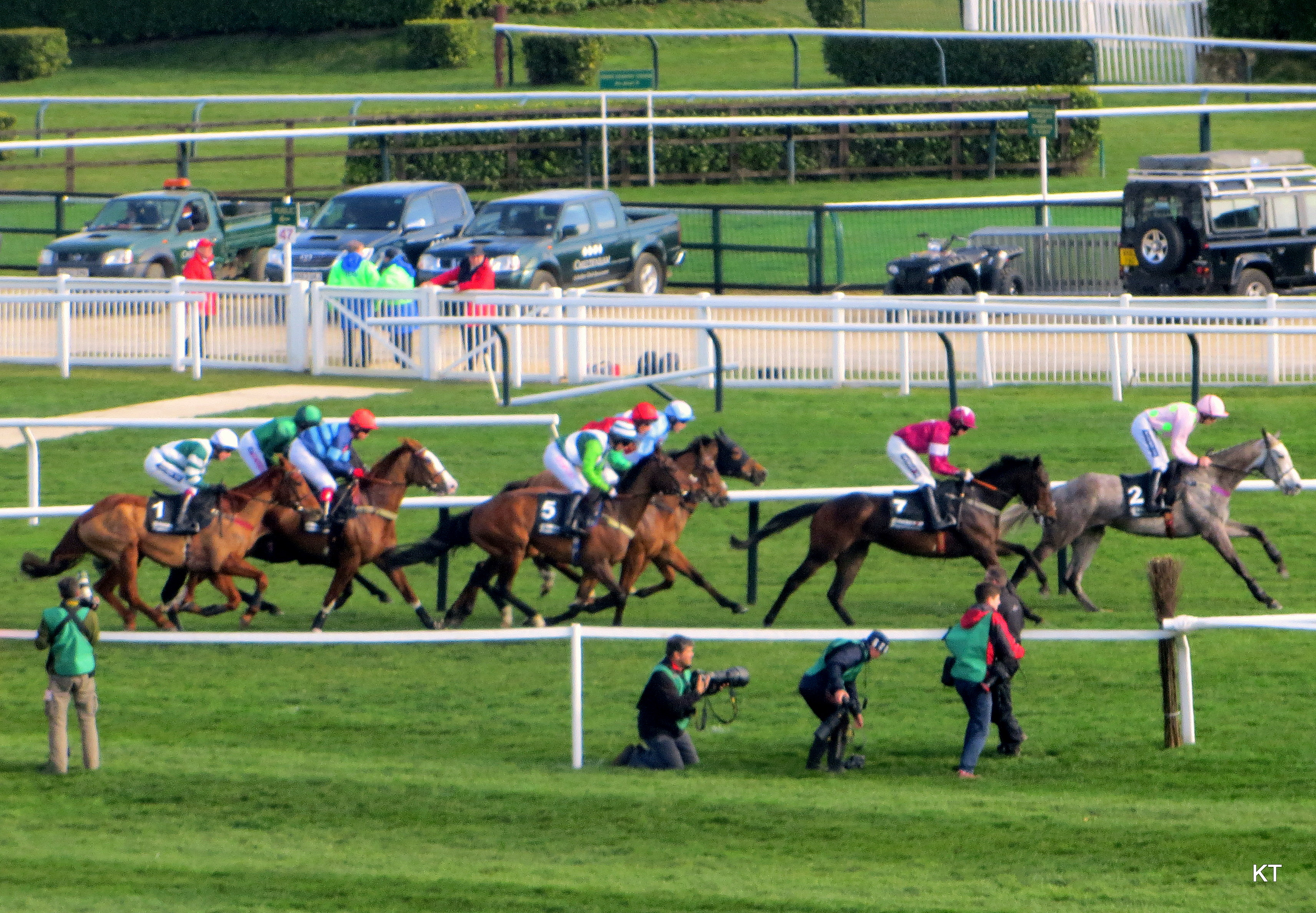
- The 2014 running
- Class: Grade 1
- Location: Cheltenham Racecourse; Cheltenham, England
- Race type: Steeplechase
- Sponsor: Singer Capital Markets
- Website: Cheltenham

Race information
- Distance: 1m 7f 199y (3,499 metres)
- Surface: Turf
- Track: Left-handed
- Qualification: Five-years-old and up
- Weight: 11 st 7 lb Allowances; 7 lb for mares
- Purse: £200,000 (2025); 1st: £112,540

Arkle Challenge Trophy Chase
2026
Kargese	Kopek Des Bordes	Lulamba

Previous years
2025
Jango Baie	Only By Night	Majborough
2024
Gaelic Warrior	Found A Fifty	Il Etait Temps
2023
El Fabiolo	Jonbon	Saint Roi
2022
Edwardstone	Gabynako	Blue Lord
2021
Shishkin	Eldorado Allen	Captain Guinness

2020-2011
2020
Put The Kettle On	Fakir D'Oudairies	Rouge Vif
2019
Duc Des Genievres	Us And Them	Articulum
2018
Footpad	Brain Power	Petit Mouchoir
2017
Altior	Cloudy Dream	Ordinary World
2016
Douvan	Sizing John	Fox Norton
2015
Un De Sceaux	God's Own	Josses Hill
2014
Western Warhorse	Champagne Fever	Trifolium
2013
Simonsig	Baily Green	His Excellency
2012
Sprinter Sacre	Cue Card	Menorah
2011
Captain Chris	Finian's Rainbow	Realt Dubh

2010-2001
2010
Sizing Europe	Somersby	Osana
2009
Forpadydeplasterer	Kalahari King	Planet of Sound
2008
Tidal Bay	Kruguyrova	Noland
2007
My Way de Solzen	Fair Along	Jack The Giant
2006
Voy Por Ustedes	Monet's Garden	Foreman
2005
Contraband	Ashley Brook	River City
2004
Well Chief	Kicking King	Le Duc
2003
Azertyuiop	Impek	Isio
2002
Moscow Flyer	Seebald	Armaturk

2000-1991
2000
Tiutchev	Cenkos	Decoupage
1999
Flagship Uberalles	Tresor De Mai	Nipper Reed
1998
Champleve	Hill Society	Mandys Mantino
1997
Or Royal	Squire Silk	Celibate
1996
Ventana Canyon	Arctic Kinsman	Super Coin
1995
Klairon Davis	Sound Man	Camitrov
1994
Nakir	Baydon Star	Southolt
1993
Travado	Wonder Man	Sybillin
1992
Young Pokey	Tinryland	Space Fair
1991
Remittance Man	Uncle Ernie	Redundant Pal

1990-1988
1990
Comandante	Kiichi	Young Snugfit
1989
Waterloo Boy	Southern Minstrel	Sabin Du Loir
1988
Danish Flight	Abbey Glen	Barnbrook Again

The Arkle Challenge Trophy is a Grade 1 National Hunt steeplechase in Great Britain which is open to horses aged five years or older. It is run on the Old Course at Cheltenham, England, over a distance of about 2 miles (1 mile, 7 furlongs and 199 yards, or 3,199 metres), and during its running there are thirteen fences to be jumped. The race is for novice chasers, and takes place each year during the Cheltenham Festival in March.

It is the leading minimum-distance chase for novices in the National Hunt calendar. It is the second race on the opening day of the festival.

== History ==
The Arkle Challenge Trophy was introduced as a replacement for the Cotswold Chase, a previous event at the Cheltenham Festival, in 1969. Its title pays tribute to Arkle, a three-time winner of the Cheltenham Gold Cup in the mid-1960s. The race was formerly scheduled to be run on the second day of the Festival, but it was switched to its slot on the opening day in 1980.

The first sponsor of the "Arkle" was Waterford Castle, which began supporting the event in 1991. It was backed by Guinness from 1994 to 1999, and from 2000 to 2011 it was sponsored by the Irish Independent newspaper. The Racing Post newspaper sponsored the race from 2012 to 2020. From 2021 to 2023 the race was sponsored by Sporting Life.

Several winners of the race have subsequently achieved victory in the most prestigious two-mile chase in the National Hunt calendar, the Queen Mother Champion Chase. The most recent was Put The Kettle On, the winner of the latter event in 2021. The 1978 winner, Alverton, went on to win the following season's Cheltenham Gold Cup.

In 2020, Put the Kettle On become the first Mare to win the race since Anaglogs Daughter in 1980.

== Records ==
Leading jockey since 1946 (4 wins):

- Barry Geraghty – Moscow Flyer (2002), Forpadydeplasterer (2009), Sprinter Sacre (2012), Simonsig (2013)
- Ruby Walsh – Azertyuiop (2003), Un de Sceaux (2015), Douvan (2016), Footpad (2018)

Leading trainer since 1946 (8 wins):

- Nicky Henderson – Remittance Man (1991), Travado (1993), Tiutchev (2000), Sprinter Sacre (2012), Simonsig (2013), Altior (2017), Shishkin (2021), Jango Baie (2025)

== Winners since 1946 ==
Year	Winner	Age	Jockey	Trainer
1946	Bright Penny	6	Glen Kelly	Bobby Norris
1947	Abandoned due to frost and snow
1948	Top Cash	6	Glen Kelly	Bobby Norris
1949	Grand Refrain	5	Glen Kelly	Bobby Norris
1950	High Level	5	Johnny Bullock	Fred Rimell
1951	Red Steel	5	Dick Francis	Frank Cundell
1952	Nautical Print	5	Tommy Cusack	Gerry Wilson
1953	Bramble Tudor	5	Tim Molony	Stewart Wight
1954	Armorial III	5	René Emery	Fulke Walwyn
1955	Manuscrit	5	Johnny Bullock	Fulke Walwyn
1956	Sir Ken	9	Tim Molony	Willie Stephenson
1957	Ballyatom	5	Bob McCreery (Note: amateur jockey)	George Beeby
1958	Fortria	6	Tom Taaffe	Tom Dreaper
1959	Flame Gun	8	Fred Winter	Charlie Mallon
1960	Mazurka	6	Ron Harrison	Ron Smyth
1961	Mountcashel King	6	Pat Taaffe	Tom Dreaper
1962	Prudent Barney	8	Johnny East	Bobby Renton
1963	Ben Stack	6	Pat Taaffe	Tom Dreaper
1964	Greektown	8	Michael Scudamore	Willie Stephenson
1965	Flyingbolt	6	Pat Taaffe	Tom Dreaper
1966	Arctic Sunset	6	George Milburn	Ken Oliver
1967	Arctic Stream	7	Ben Hannon	Pat Rooney
1968	The Hustler	6	Barry Brogan	Earl Jones
1969	Chatham	5	Terry Biddlecombe	Fred Rimell
1970	Soloning	5	Paul Kelleway	Fred Winter
1971	Alpheus	6	Eddie Wright	Tom Dreaper
1972	Pendil	7	Richard Pitman	Fred Winter
1973	Denys Adventure	8	Graham Thorner	Tim Forster
1974	Canasta Lad	8	Jeff King	Peter Bailey
1975	Broncho II	6	Colin Tinkler	Tony Dickinson
1976	Roaring Wind	8	Reg Crank	Roy Cambidge
1977	Tip the Wink	7	Dessie Hughes	Pat Taylor
1978	Alverton	8	Graham Thorner	Peter Easterby
1979	Chinrullah	7	Dessie Hughes	Mick O'Toole
1980	Anaglogs Daughter	7	Tommy Carberry	Bill Durkan
1981	Clayside	7	Alan Brown	Peter Easterby
1982	The Brockshee	7	Tommy Carberry	Arthur Moore
1983	Ryeman	6	Alan Brown	Peter Easterby
1984	Bobsline	8	Frank Berry	Francis Flood
1985	Boreen Prince	8	Niall Madden	Andrew McNamara
1986	Oregon Trail	6	Ronnie Beggan	Simon Christian
1987	Gala's Image	7	Richard Linley	Mercy Rimell
1988	Danish Flight	9	Mark Dwyer	Jimmy FitzGerald
1989	Waterloo Boy	6	Richard Dunwoody	David Nicholson
1990	Comandante	8	Peter Hobbs	Josh Gifford
1991	Remittance Man	7	Richard Dunwoody	Nicky Henderson
1992	Young Pokey	7	Jamie Osborne	Oliver Sherwood
1993	Travado	7	Jamie Osborne	Nicky Henderson
1994	Nakir	6	Jamie Osborne	Simon Christian
1995	Klairon Davis	6	Francis Woods	Arthur Moore
1996	Ventana Canyon	7	Richard Dunwoody	Edward O'Grady
1997	Or Royal	6	Tony McCoy	Martin Pipe
1998	Champleve	5	Tony McCoy	Martin Pipe
1999	Flagship Uberalles	5	Joe Tizzard	Paul Nicholls
2000	Tiutchev	7	Mick Fitzgerald	Nicky Henderson
2001	Abandoned due to a foot-and-mouth outbreak
2002	Moscow Flyer	8	Barry Geraghty	Jessica Harrington
2003	Azertyuiop	6	Ruby Walsh	Paul Nicholls
2004	Well Chief	5	Tony McCoy	Martin Pipe
2005	Contraband	7	Timmy Murphy	Martin Pipe
2006	Voy Por Ustedes	5	Robert Thornton	Alan King
2007	My Way de Solzen	7	Robert Thornton	Alan King
2008	Tidal Bay	7	Denis O'Regan	Howard Johnson
2009	Forpadydeplasterer	7	Barry Geraghty	Tom Cooper
2010	Sizing Europe	8	Andrew Lynch	Henry de Bromhead
2011	Captain Chris	7	Richard Johnson	Philip Hobbs
2012	Sprinter Sacre	6	Barry Geraghty	Nicky Henderson
2013	Simonsig	7	Barry Geraghty	Nicky Henderson
2014	Western Warhorse	6	Tom Scudamore	David Pipe
2015	Un de Sceaux	7	Ruby Walsh	Willie Mullins
2016	Douvan	6	Ruby Walsh	Willie Mullins
2017	Altior	7	Nico de Boinville	Nicky Henderson
2018	Footpad	6	Ruby Walsh	Willie Mullins
2019	Duc des Genievres	6	Paul Townend	Willie Mullins
2020	Put The Kettle On	6	Aidan Coleman	Henry de Bromhead
2021	Shishkin	7	Nico de Boinville	Nicky Henderson
2022	Edwardstone	8	Tom Cannon	Alan King
2023	El Fabiolo	6	Paul Townend	Willie Mullins
2024	Gaelic Warrior	6	Paul Townend	Willie Mullins
2025	Jango Baie	6	Nico de Boinville	Nicky Henderson
2026	Kargese	6	Danny Mullins	Willie Mullins

== See also ==
- Horse racing in Great Britain
- List of British National Hunt races
