= WillowWarm Gold Cup =

Steeplechase horse race in Ireland

- Class: Grade 1
- Location: Fairyhouse; County Meath, Ireland
- Race type: Steeplechase
- Sponsor: WillowWarm
- Website: Fairyhouse

Race information
- Distance: 2m 4f (4,023 metres)
- Surface: Turf
- Track: Right-handed
- Qualification: Five-years-old and up
- Weight: 11 st 10 lb Allowances; 7 lb for mares
- Purse: €100,000 (2023); 1st: €59,000

Ryanair Gold Cup
2026
Fleur In The Park	Kappa Jy Pyke	Jimmy Du Seuil

Previous years
2025
Spindleberry	Firefox	Champ Kiely
2024
Spillane's Tower	Tactical Move	Blood Destiny
2023
Flame Bearer	Sir Gerhard	Appreciate It
2022
Galopin Des Champs	Master McShee	Riviere D'etel
2021
Janidil	Franco De Port	Asterion Forlonge

2020-2011
2019
Voix Du Reve	Real Steel	Winter Escape
2018
Al Boum Photo	Shattered Love	Invitation Only
2017
Road To Respect	Yorkhill	Ball D'arc
2016
Kylemore Lough	Outlander	Blair Perrone
2015
Gilgamboa	The Tullow Tank	Smashing
2014
Rebel Fitz	Bright New Dawn	Only two finished
2013
Realt Mor	Dedigout	Mikael D'Haguenet
2012
Flemenstar	Rathlin	False Economy
2011
Realt Dubh	Loosen My Load	Mr Cracker

2010-2001
2010
Jadanli	Deal Done	Shakervilz
2009
Aran Concerto	Barker	Deutschland
2008
Conna Castle	Big Zeb	Oscar Honey
2007
One Cool Cookie	Schindlers Hunt	Anothercoppercoast
2006
Justified	In Compliance	The Railway Man
2005
Like-A-Butterfly	Forget The Past	Watson Lake
2004
Hi Cloy	Kicking King	Nil Desperandum
2003
Thari	One Night Out	Only two finished
2002
Big-And-Bold	Harbour Pilot	Biliverdin
2001
Sackville	Limestone Lad	Alcapone

2000-1991
2000
Native Upmanship	Sunrise Special	Only two finished
1999
Rince Ri	Promalee	Micko's Dream
1998
Delphi Lodge	Tempo	Fiddlers Tune
1997
Dorans Pride	Jeffell	Merry Gale
1996
Love The Lord	Common Policy	Double Symphony
1995
Strong Platinum	Sound Man	Imperial Call
1994
Merry Gale	Glencloud	Only two finished
1993
How's The Boss	Galevilla Express	Lasata
1992
General Idea	Second Schedual	Mass Appeal
1991
Garamycin	El-Sid Senor	Toranfield

The WillowWarm Gold Cup is a Grade 1 National Hunt steeplechase in Ireland which is open to horses aged five years or older. It is run at Fairyhouse over a distance of about 2 miles and 4 furlongs (4,023 metres), and during its running there are sixteen fences to be jumped. The race is for novice chasers, and it is scheduled to take place each year on Easter Sunday.

The event was formerly sponsored by Irish Distillers, the producers of Powers Whiskey and from 2015 to 2019 it was sponsored by Irish airline Ryanair. In 2021 it was sponsored by Underwriting Exchange, in 2022 by BoyleSports and since 2023 by WillowWarm. It is run during the Fairyhouse Easter Festival, a three-day meeting which also features the Irish Grand National. Prior to 1994 it was contested over 2 miles and 2 furlongs.

== Records ==
Leading jockey since 1960 (4 wins):

- Paul Carberry – Thari (2003), Conna Castle (2008), Aran Concerto (2009), Realt Dubh (2011)

Leading trainer since 1960 (6 wins):

- Willie Mullins - Al Boum Photo (2018), Voix Du Reve (2019), Janidil (2021), Galopin Des Champs (2022), Flame Bearer (2023), Spindleberry (2025)0

== Winners since 1960 ==
Year	Winner	Age	Jockey	Trainer
1960	Owen's Sedge	7	Christy Kinane	Darrell Farmer
1961	Commutering		Willie Robinson	Dan Moore
1962	Coniston		Joe Malone	Charlie Weld
1963	Arkle	6	Pat Taaffe	Tom Dreaper
1964	Fort Leney	6	Pat Taaffe	Tom Dreaper
1965	Doone Valley	6	Pat Taaffe	Tom Dreaper
1966	Vulpine	5	Matt Curran	Paddy Mullins
1967	White Abbess	6	Sean Barker	Tom Dreaper
1968	Bold Fencer	7	Stan Murphy	Phonsie O'Brien
1969	Kinloch Brae	6	Timmy Hyde	Willie O'Grady
1970	No Other	7	Bobby Coonan	Lord Fingall
1971	Glending		J. Donaghy	Paddy Osborne
1972	Frou Frou	5	Tommy Carberry	Dan Moore
1973	Vulforo		Sean Barker	Jim Dreaper
1974	Captain Christy	7	Bobby Beasley	Pat Taaffe
1975	Golden Lancer		Mouse Morris	Edward O'Grady
1976	Troubled Times	7	L. O'Donnell	Peter McCreery
1977	Bunker Hill	7	Mouse Morris	Adrian Maxwell
1978	Ballyross		Tommy Carberry	Jim Dreaper
1979	Persian Wanderer		Gerry Dowd	Jim Dreaper
1980	Paddy Bouler	7	John Harty	Pat Rooney
1981	The Mighty Mac	6	Gerry Newman	Tom Costello
1982	Sean Ogue	6	P. Walsh	Michael O'Brien
1983	Step Together	7	Enda Bolger (Note: amateur jockey)	J. P. Bourke
1984	Bobsline	8	Frank Berry	Francis Flood
1985	Lucisis	6	Frank Berry	Francis Flood
1986	Barrow Line	9	Frank Berry	Pat Hughes
1987	Tickite Boo	7	Mark Dwyer	Jimmy FitzGerald
1988	Haepenny Well	7	Tommy Carmody	Gillian O'Brien
1989	Carvill's Hill	7	Ken Morgan	Jim Dreaper
1990	Blitzkreig	7	Tommy Carmody	Edward O'Grady
1991	Garamycin	9	Brendan Sheridan	Willie Deacon
1992	General Idea	7	Brendan Sheridan	Dermot Weld
1993	How's the Boss	7	Mark Dwyer	John Brassil
1994	Merry Gale	6	Kevin O'Brien	Jim Dreaper
1995	Strong Platinum	7	Conor O'Dwyer	Paddy Burke
1996	Love the Lord	6	Tommy Treacy	Daniel O'Connell
1997	Dorans Pride	8	Richard Dunwoody	Michael Hourigan
1998	Delphi Lodge	8	Tommy Treacy	Tom Taaffe
1999	Rince Ri	6	Ruby Walsh	Ted Walsh
2000	Native Upmanship	7	Conor O'Dwyer	Arthur Moore
2001	Sackville	8	David Casey	Frances Crowley
2002	Big-and-Bold	6	Ruby Walsh	Ger Lyons
2003	Thari	6	Paul Carberry	Noel Meade
2004	Hi Cloy	7	Timmy Murphy	Michael Hourigan
2005	Like-A-Butterfly	11	Tony McCoy	Christy Roche
2006	Justified	7	Tony McCoy	Dusty Sheehy
2007	One Cool Cookie	6	David Casey	Charlie Swan
2008	Conna Castle	9	Paul Carberry	Jimmy Mangan
2009	Aran Concerto	8	Paul Carberry	Noel Meade
2010	Jadanli	8	Andrew Lynch	Paul John Gilligan
2011	Realt Dubh	7	Paul Carberry	Noel Meade
2012	Flemenstar	7	Andrew Lynch	Peter Casey
2013	Realt Mor	8	Davy Condon	Gordon Elliott
2014	Rebel Fitz	9	Barry Geraghty	Michael Winters
2015	Gilgamboa	7	Tony McCoy	Enda Bolger
2016	Kylemore Lough	7	Barry Geraghty	Kerry Lee
2017	Road To Respect	6	Bryan Cooper	Noel Meade
2018	Al Boum Photo	6	David Mullins	Willie Mullins
2019	Voix Du Reve	7	Ruby Walsh	Willie Mullins
	no race 2020
2021	Janidil	7	Jody McGarvey	Willie Mullins
2022	Galopin Des Champs	7	Paul Townend	Willie Mullins
2023	Flame Bearer	8	Sean O'Keeffe	Willie Mullins
2024	Spillane's Tower	6	Mark Walsh	Jimmy Mangan
2025	Spindleberry	7	Danny Mullins	Willie Mullins
2026	Fleur In The Park	7	Cian Quirke	Andrew Slattery

== See also ==
- Horse racing in Ireland
- List of Irish National Hunt races
