= Fortria =

Irish-bred Thoroughbred racehorse

- Sire: Fortina
- Grandsire: Formor
- Dam: Senria
- Damsire: Sun Yat Sen
- Sex: Gelding
- Foaled: 1952
- Country: Ireland
- Colour: Bay
- Breeder: Mr. A. Craigie
- Owner: George Ansley
- Trainer: Tom Dreaper
- Earnings: £20,344

Major wins
- Cotswold Chase (1958); Champion Chase (1960, 1961); Mackeson Gold Cup (1960, 1962); Irish Grand National (1961); Punchestown Handicap Chase (1961); Pathfinder Chase (1959)

Honours
- Fortria Chase at Navan

Fortria (foaled 1952) was an Irish National Hunt horse best known as the first dual winner of the Champion Chase and winner of the inaugural Mackeson Gold Cup. Although very successful over two miles, he also excelled at longer distances, and won the 1961 Irish Grand National and finished second in the 1962 and 1963 Cheltenham Gold Cups.

== Background ==
Fortria was a bay horse bred by Mr. A. Craigie. His sire, Fortina, won the Cheltenham Gold Cup in 1947, the only entire (stallion) to do so. His dam, Senria also produced the 1957 and 1958 National Hunt Handicap Chase winner Sentina and the 1963 Irish Grand National winner Last Link.

Fortria was owned by George Ansley and put into training with outstanding Irish trainer Tom Dreaper, who later trained Arkle. Fortria was ridden by Irish jockey Pat Taaffe.

== Career ==
=== Early career ===
Fortria made his debut in a maiden hurdle over two miles at Mullingar in 1957, where he finished ninth to Prince Swallow. He then finished third in the Glenview Hurdle at Leopardstown before switching to fences. He had much more success as a chaser, winning four races in Ireland before triumphing in the Cotswold Chase at Cheltenham by five lengths.

Fortria failed to win in the 1958/59 season due to a breathing problem, which was rectified when he was hobdayed.

=== 1959/1960 Season ===
Returning the following autumn, Fortria won the two mile Pathfinder Chase at Manchester. Sent off the 6/5 favourite and carrying 12 st 3 lbs, he beat Nickleby by one and a half lengths. Back in Ireland, Fortria was stepped up in trip in a three-mile chase, where he was beaten a short head by Leopardstown Chase winner Fredith's Son while conceding him 12 lbs. Fortria followed this up by finishing fourth in the Baldoyle Handicap Chase and second in the Easter Chase at Fairyhouse, where he gave 13 lbs to the future Grand Annual Challenge Cup winner Monsieur Trois Etoiles.

Fortria returned to Cheltenham to contest the Champion Chase, which had been run for the first time in 1959. As the previous winner, Quita Que, was injured, Fortria was sent off the 2/1 favourite against Double Star and Blue Dolphin. Fortria contested the lead with Flame Gun (winner of the 1959 Cotswold Chase), who fell at the third last, before winning by three lengths from Blue Dolphin.

Fortria completed his season by running in the Galway Plate under 12 st 7 lbs, where he finished fourth to Sparkling Flame.

=== 1960/1961 Season ===
Fortria had a very successful season the following year, winning eight out of his ten races in England and Ireland. He started off by winning a hurdle race in Ireland, before travelling to Cheltenham for the newly introduced Mackeson Gold Cup over two miles. Top weight was Saffron Tartan, who went on to win that season's King George VI Chase and Cheltenham Gold Cup, on 12 st, but by virtue of his hurdles win, Fortria was given a 7 lb penalty and carried the same weight. Fortria stalked the pace in fifth before making progress down the hill to take the lead and win by six lengths from Icanopit (carrying just 10 st 3 lbs). Saffron Tartan finished down the field.

Back in Ireland, Fortria defeated Albergo, dual winner of the Irish Champion Hurdle, in a chase over two miles three furlongs while conceding 19 lbs. He then finished fifth in the Thyestes Chase to Hunter's Breeze (who had won the Christmas Chase at Leopardstown) and Mr. What (who had won the 1958 Grand National). Fortria next defeated Champion Hurdle winner Another Flash in a hurdle race at Baldoyle.

He returned to the Cheltenham Festival to defend his Champion Chase title. Also in the five-runner field were 1959 winner Quita Que, 1963 winner Sandy Abbot, Monsieur Trois Etoiles, and top novice Retour de Flamme. Quita Que led at a steady early pace, while Fortria tracked with Sandy Abbot. At the second last fence, Fortria had only a narrow advantage over his rivals but kept on well up the hill to win by two lengths. Dreaper had given him an entry in the Cheltenham Gold Cup, but the decision was made to withdraw him after this effort. However, Quita Que reappeared two days later to win the Cathcart Challenge Cup.

Fortria stepped up in trip for the Irish Grand National at Fairyhouse on his next start. The race was run on good ground and, carrying 12 st, he defeated thirteen rivals to win by four lengths. Also in the field were Owen's Sedge, who had won the Powers Gold Cup in 1960, and Zonda, the 1959 Irish Grand National winner.

=== 1961/1962 Season ===
Fortria won only once in seven races that year, with that victory coming in a walkover. He was beaten by ten lengths when conceding Grallagh Cnoc 18 lbs. He then ran in the Mackeson Gold Cup and was second by three lengths to Scottish Memories (receiving 16 lbs), who had won his last nine races. Back in fifth was 1960 Cheltenham Gold Cup winner Pas Seul.

Rather than running in the Champion Chase at the Festival, connections made the decision to run Fortria in the Cheltenham Gold Cup. In the race, he came up against the other top chaser of the era, Mandarin, who had won two Hennessy Gold Cups and two King George VI Chases. Fortria hit the front in what looked like a winning move, until Mandarin came driving up the inside under Fred Winter to triumph by a length. The two horses were ten lengths clear of their rivals.

Fortria then ran in the Punchestown Handicap Chase over two miles, where he was third to Owen's Sedge, conceding 23 lbs.

=== 1962/1963 Season ===
The following season, Mandarin had retired but Fortria was still considered the dominant chaser in Ireland. Fortria won the Hermitage Chase over a two and half miles at Newbury, defeating Whitbread Gold Cup winner Hoodwinked by three lengths. He next ran in the Mackeson Gold Cup for the third time, where he was again allocated 12 st and faced two Champion Chase winners in Piperton and Sandy Abbot. Sandy Abbot led the field while Fortria lingered further back until the last open ditch, where he moved forward with a great leap at the fence. Coming to the last, he was strongly challenged by the lightly weighted School For Gamble and Owen's Sedge but refused to yield and galloped on to win by three lengths.

This victory was his seventh in England and nineteenth in total, bringing his earnings to £19,731. He next ran in the two mile Baldoyle Handicap Chase but made little impression. He ran in the Cheltenham Gold Cup in March but was no match for the six-year-old Mill House, who ran away from the field to win by ten lengths.

Fortria then attempted to win a second Irish Grand National under 12 st but tired in the heavy ground and fell when well behind. His sister, Last Link, won the race under 9 st 7 lbs.

=== 1963/1964 Season ===
Fortria recorded his final victory in a race in Ireland, then finished second in the Becher Steeplechase under a weight of 12 st 7 lbs after tiring and making a mistake at the last fence. His final race came in the Mackeson Gold Cup where, under top weight for the fourth time, he struggled into fifth behind Richard Of Bordeaux. It was the first time he had ever finished out of the first two in England.

== Retirement ==
Soon after his Mackeson Gold Cup run, Fortria was retired by his connections as the winner of twenty races and £20,344. The Grade 2 Fortria Chase at Navan is named in his honour and features Moscow Flyer and Native Upmanship among its winners.
