= William Holman Gold Cup =

Steeplechase horse race in Britain

- Class: Premier Handicap
- Location: Cheltenham Racecourse; Cheltenham, England
- Inaugurated: 1960
- Race type: Steeplechase
- Sponsor: Paddy Power
- Website: www.thejockeyclub.co.uk/cheltenham/

Race information
- Distance: 2m 4½f (4,124 metres)
- Surface: Turf
- Track: Left-handed
- Qualification: Four-years-old and up
- Weight: Handicap
- Purse: £160,000 (2025); 1st: £91,120

William Holman Gold Cup Chase
2026
Meetmebythesea	Blueking D'oroux	Torneo

Previous years
2025
Panic Attack	Vincenzo	Hoe Joly Smoke
2024
Il Ridoto	Ga Law	Lets Go Champ
2023
Stage Star	Notlongtillmay	Il Ridoto
2022
Ga Law	French Dynamite	Midnight River
2021
Midnight Shadow	Protektorat	Lalor

2020-2011
2020
Coole Cody	Spiritofthegames	Al Dancer
2019
Happy Diva	Brelan D'As	Warthog
2018
Baron Alco	Frodon	Guitar Pete
2017
Splash of Ginge	Starchitect	Le Prezien
2016
Taquin Du Seuil	Village Vic	Buywise
2015
Annacotty	Buywise	Sound Investment
2014
Caid Du Berlais	Johns Spirit	Present View
2013
Johns Spirit	Colour Squadron	Hidden Cyclone
2012
Al Ferof	Walkon	Nadiya De La Vega
2011
Great Endeavour	Quantitativeeasing	Divers

2010-2001
2010
Little Josh	Dancing Tornado	Long Run
2009
Tranquil Sea	Poquelin	Hold Em
2008
Imperial Commander	Barbers Shop	Private Be
2007
L'Antartique	Il Duce	Knowhere
2006
Exotic Dancer	Vodka Bleu	New Alco
2005
Our Vic	Monkerhostin	Kandjar D'allier
2004
Celestial Gold	Thisthatandtother	Monkerhostin
2003
Fondmort	Poliantas	Ei Ei
2002
Cyfor Malta	Poliantas	Wave Rock
2001
Shooting Light	Foly Pleasant	Exit Swinger

2000-1991
2000
Lady Cricket	Exit Swinger	Feathered Leader
1999
The Outback Way	Stormy Passage	Sounds Like Fun
1998
Cyfor Malta	Simply Dashing	Dr Leunt
1997
Senor El Betrutti	Challenger Du Luc	Bertone
1996
Challenger Du Luc	Strong Promise	Addington Boy
1995
Dublin Flyer	Egypt Mill Prince	Big Matt
1994
Bradbury Star	Second Schedual	Egypt Mill Prince
1993
Bradbury Star	Egypt Mill Prince	General Pershing
1992
Tipping Tim	Another Coral	Beech Road
1991
Another Coral	Toranfield	Sword Beach

1990-1987
1990
Multum in Parvo	Thar-An-Bharr	New Halen
1989
Joint Sovereignty	Golden Freeze	Dudie
1988
Pegwell Bay	Dudie	Townley Stone
1987
Beau Ranger	Gee-A	Tickite Boo

The William Holman Gold Cup, currently known as the Paddy Power Gold Cup for sponsorship reasons, is a Premier Handicap National Hunt chase in Great Britain which is open to horses aged four years or older. It is run on the Old Course at Cheltenham over a distance of about 2 miles and 4½ furlongs (2 miles 4 furlongs and 44 yards, or 4,064 metres), and during its running there are sixteen fences to be jumped. It is a handicap race, and it is scheduled to take place each year in mid November.

The event was established in 1960, and it was originally sponsored by Mackeson. It was known as the Mackeson Gold Cup until 1995, but since then it has had various sponsors and several title changes. It was backed by Murphy's from 1996, and by Thomas Pink from 2000. The bookmaker Paddy Power began supporting the race in 2003 and their sponsorship continued until the 2015 running. In 2016 the sponsorship was taken over by another bookmaking firm BetVictor. Paddy Power returned for a second period of sponsorship in 2020. The race gained its registered title in 2026, honouring three-time Grand National-winning trainer William Holman.

== Records ==
Most successful horse (2 wins):

- Fortria – 1960, 1962
- Gay Trip – 1969, 1971
- Half Free – 1984, 1985
- Bradbury Star – 1993, 1994
- Cyfor Malta – 1998, 2002

Leading jockey (4 wins):

- Tony McCoy – Cyfor Malta (1998), Lady Cricket (2000), Shooting Light (2001), Exotic Dancer (2006)

Leading trainer (8 wins):

- Martin Pipe – Beau Ranger (1987), Challenger du Luc (1996), Cyfor Malta (1998, 2002), Lady Cricket (2000), Shooting Light (2001), Celestial Gold (2004), Our Vic (2005)

== Winners ==
- Weights given in stones and pounds.

Year	Winner	Age	Weight	Jockey	Trainer
1960	Fortria	8	12-00	Pat Taaffe	Tom Dreaper
1961	Scottish Memories	7	10–12	Cathal Finnegan	Arthur Thomas
1962	Fortria	10	12-00	Pat Taaffe	Tom Dreaper
1963	Richard of Bordeaux	8	10-05	Bobby Beasley	Fulke Walwyn
1964	Super Flash	9	10-05	Stan Mellor	Frank Cundell
1965	Dunkirk	8	12-07	Bill Rees	Peter Cazalet
1966	Pawnbroker	8	11-09	Paddy Broderick	Arthur Stephenson
1967	Charlie Worcester	10	10–11	Josh Gifford	Ryan Price
1968	Jupiter Boy	7	10-03	Eddie Harty	Fred Rimell
1969	Gay Trip	9	11-05	Terry Biddlecombe	Fred Rimell
1970	Chatham	6	10-03	Ken White	Fred Rimell
1971	Gay Trip	9	11-03	Terry Biddlecombe	Fred Rimell
1972	Red Candle	8	10-00	Jimmy Fox	Ricky Vallance
1973	Skymas	8	10-05	Stan Murphy	Brian Lusk
1974	Bruslee	8	10-07	Andrew Turnell	Michael Scudamore
1975	Clear Cut	11	10-09	David Greaves	Maurice Camacho
1976 (Note: The 1976 running took place at Haydock Park)	Cancello	7	11-01	Dennis Atkins	Neville Crump
1977	Bachelor's Hall	7	10-06	Martin O'Halloran	Peter Cundell
1978	Bawnogues	7	10-07	Craig Smith	Martin Tate
1979	Man Alive	8	10-09	Ron Barry	Gordon W. Richards
1980	Bright Highway	6	11-01	Gerry Newman	Michael O'Brien
1981	Henry Kissinger	7	10–13	Paul Barton	David Gandolfo
1982	Fifty Dollars More	7	11-00	Richard Linley	Fred Winter
1983	Pounentes	6	10-06	Neale Doughty	Billy McGhie
1984	Half Free	8	11–10	Richard Linley	Fred Winter
1985	Half Free	9	11–10	Richard Linley	Fred Winter
1986	Very Promising	8	11–13	Richard Dunwoody	David Nicholson
1987	Beau Ranger	9	10-02	Mark Perrett	Martin Pipe
1988	Pegwell Bay	7	11-02	Peter Scudamore	Tim Forster
1989	Joint Sovereignty	9	10-04	Graham McCourt	Philip Hobbs
1990	Multum in Parvo	7	10-02	Norman Williamson	John Edwards
1991	Another Coral	8	10-01	Richard Dunwoody	David Nicholson
1992	Tipping Tim	7	10–10	Carl Llewellyn	Nigel Twiston-Davies
1993	Bradbury Star	8	11-08	Declan Murphy	Josh Gifford
1994	Bradbury Star	9	11–11	Philip Hide	Josh Gifford
1995	Dublin Flyer	9	11-08	Brendan Powell	Tim Forster
1996	Challenger du Luc	6	10-02	Richard Dunwoody	Martin Pipe
1997	Senor El Betrutti	8	10-00	Jamie Osborne	Susan Nock
1998	Cyfor Malta	5	11-03	Tony McCoy	Martin Pipe
1999	The Outback Way	9	10-00	Norman Williamson	Venetia Williams
2000	Lady Cricket	6	10–13	Tony McCoy	Martin Pipe
2001	Shooting Light	8	11-03	Tony McCoy	Martin Pipe
2002	Cyfor Malta	9	11-09	Barry Geraghty	Martin Pipe
2003	Fondmort	7	10–13	Mick Fitzgerald	Nicky Henderson
2004	Celestial Gold	6	10-02	Timmy Murphy	Martin Pipe
2005	Our Vic	7	11-07	Timmy Murphy	Martin Pipe
2006	Exotic Dancer	6	11-02	Tony McCoy	Jonjo O'Neill
2007	L'Antartique	7	10–13	Graham Lee	Ferdy Murphy
2008	Imperial Commander	7	10-07	Paddy Brennan	Nigel Twiston-Davies
2009	Tranquil Sea	7	10–13	Andrew McNamara	Edward O'Grady
2010	Little Josh	8	10-05	Sam Twiston-Davies	Nigel Twiston-Davies
2011	Great Endeavour	7	10-03	Timmy Murphy	David Pipe
2012	Al Ferof	7	11-08	Ruby Walsh	Paul Nicholls
2013	Johns Spirit	6	10-02	Richie McLernon	Jonjo O'Neill
2014	Caid Du Berlais	5	10–13	Sam Twiston-Davies	Paul Nicholls
2015	Annacotty	7	11-00	Ian Popham	Alan King
2016	Taquin Du Seuil	9	11–11	Aidan Coleman	Jonjo O'Neill
2017	Splash Of Ginge	9	10–06	Tom Bellamy	Nigel Twiston-Davies
2018	Baron Alco	7	10-11	Jamie Moore	Gary Moore
2019	Happy Diva	8	11-00	Richard Patrick	Kerry Lee
2020	Coole Cody	9	10-05	Tom O'Brien	Evan Williams
2021	Midnight Shadow	8	11-05	Ryan Mania	Sue Smith
2022	Ga Law	6	11-00	Jonathan Burke	Jamie Snowden
2023	Stage Star	7	11–07	Harry Cobden	Paul Nicholls
2024	Il Ridoto	7	09–13	Freddie Gingell	Paul Nicholls
2025	Panic Attack	9	11-01	Harry Skelton	Dan Skelton
2026	Meetmebythesea	6	11-10	Harry Cobden	Ben Pauling

== See also ==
- Horse racing in Great Britain
- List of British National Hunt races
