= Height of Fashion =

Height of Fashion may refer to:

- The Height of Fashion (album), a 2004 re-release of Fabrique by English new wave band Fashion
- Height of Fashion (horse) (1979–2000), a racehorse
- Height of Fashion Stakes, a British horse race

== See also ==
- Fashion
- Height O'Fashion, a 1960s racehorse
