= Flyingbolt =

British-bred Thoroughbred racehorse

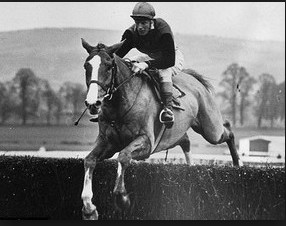
- Sire: Airborne
- Grandsire: Precipitation
- Dam: Eastlock
- Damsire: Easton
- Sex: Gelding
- Foaled: 1959
- Country: Great Britain
- Colour: Chestnut
- Breeder: Mr. R.E. Way
- Owner: Mrs. Jean Wilkinson
- Trainer: Tom Dreaper (in Ireland)
- Record: 34: 18-3-6 (All races); 25:12-3-5 (Chases); 6:4-0-1 (Hurdles); 3:2-0-0 (Flat)

Major wins
- Irish Grand National (1966); Queen Mother Champion Chase (1966); Thyestes Chase (1966); Arkle Challenge Trophy (1965); Massey Ferguson Gold Cup (1965); Black & White Whisky Gold Cup (1965); Irish Champion Hurdle (1964); Supreme Novices' Hurdle (1964)

Awards
- Timeform Rating: 210; Champion Novice Hurdler (1964); Champion Novice Chaser (1965); Champion Two-Mile Chaser (1966); Champion Irish Hurdler (1964 & 1966)

Honours
- Flyingbolt Novice Chase at Navan

Flyingbolt (1959–1983) was a famous racehorse. Officially, he is the second best steeplechaser of all time, behind only Arkle, who was ironically stabled just a few doors away in the same yard at Kilsallaghan, Co. Dublin where both were trained by Tom Dreaper. A comparison of their merits is probably best illustrated by the Official Handicapper, who at the end of the 1965–1966 season rated Arkle the superior by only 1 lb (0.5 kg). Timeform, the highly respected racing publication, had a difference of 2 lbs between them. However, whereas Arkle is feted and remembered as the greatest steeplechaser of all time, Flyingbolt has been all but forgotten. Over hurdles, he was the best Tom Dreaper ever trained, a long way superior to Arkle in that discipline, as evidenced by the fact that stable jockey Pat Taaffe could not ride Arkle in 3 of his 5 handicap hurdles because he was unable to do the very light weights that Arkle was set to carry in those races, and in two of which he finished unplaced when carrying just 10-1 and 10-5. Flyingbolt's wins included the Gloucestershire Hurdle at Cheltenham (now the Supreme Novices' Hurdle) and the Scalp Hurdle at Leopardstown (now the Irish Champion Hurdle). He also finished third in the Champion Hurdle at Cheltenham. Flyingbolt and Arkle never met on the race track, mainly because they were trained by the same man, and he preferred to keep them apart.

== Background ==
Flyingbolt was born in 1959 in unusual circumstances. His sire Airborne, the 1946 Derby winner, had become almost totally impotent by 1958 having only managed to get 3 mares in foal in each of his previous 2 seasons at stud. As a result, he was of little interest to breeders, so local man Robert Way gave him a home on his small stud farm where he housed a few mares of his own. Aware of his near non-existent reproductive history in recent years, Way put him into a paddock as a companion for the 19-year-old mare Eastlock, which he had purchased for 50 guineas at a dispersal sale in 1941. Eastlock, who was unraced, delivered 10 foals in 11 years for her new owner, but at 18 years-of-age and having failed to conceive in 1957, she was retired from breeding. However, her natural-born union with Airborne in 1958 resulted in the birth of a chestnut colt foal the following spring when she was 20 years-of-age. There was little to recommend the newborn in terms of his pedigree, with his sire being deemed a failure at stud and none of his immediate female line having ever set foot on a racecourse. Way sold him as a foal at the Newmarket December Sales for 210 guineas to Larry Ryan from Co. Clare in Ireland. After winning in the show ring as a yearling, he was offered for sale that autumn at Goffs Ballsbridge sales in Dublin through the Rathmore Stud owned by six-time Irish champion jockey Martin Molony, and was bought by George Ponsonby for 490 guineas. Ponsonby had already purchased a number of horses which went into training with Tom Dreaper. This one did likewise and was passed on to Mrs. Jean Wilkinson, who combined the names of his sire (Airborne) and dam (Eastlock) to give him the name Flyingbolt.

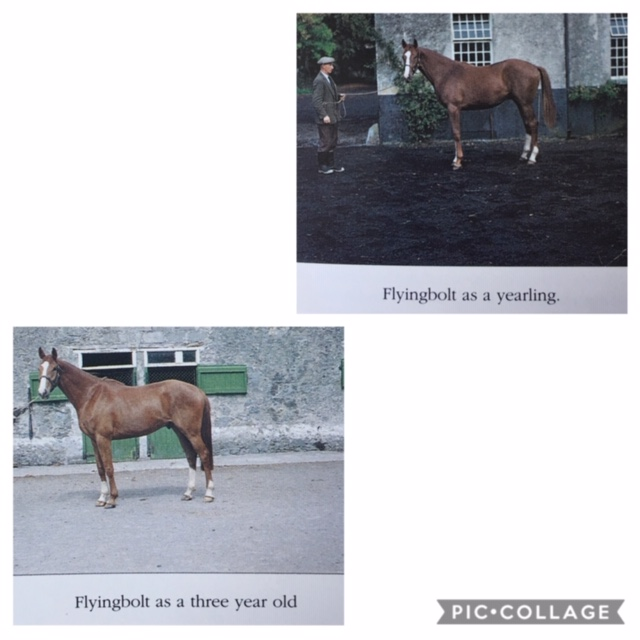
Flyingbolt as a younger horse

== Racing career ==
=== Early career ===
Flyingbolt made his racecourse debut on 13 May 1963 in a flat race over 12 furlongs at Leopardstown with Liam McLoughlin on board. Starting at 20/1, he finished down the field. He was still immature and needed more time to fill into his massive frame, so he was turned out into a field for the summer. His run at Leopardstown would be his only defeat for the next two-and-a-half years.

Flyingbolt re-appeared at Navan on 9 October 1963 when winning a national hunt flat race by 7 lengths at odds of 8/11 in the hands of top amateur Alan Lillingston. Coincidentally, Arkle won his only flat race ever on the same card half an hour earlier. Lillingston would later recall; "The lads in the yard told me he could really go. Halfway down the back not much was happening, so I gave him one crack down the shoulder and he took off like a jet plane."

After winning his next start on the flat at Leopardstown by 4 lengths with Liam McLoughlin in the saddle, Flyingbolt was switched to hurdles the following month, easily winning his maiden at the Leopardstown Christmas meeting where he was ridden in public for the first time by stable jockey Pat Taaffe, who was to ride him in all of his jump races whilst in the care of Dreaper. He then won the Killester Hurdle at Baldoyle, winning in such effortless fashion that he was allowed to take his chance in the Scalp Hurdle (now the Irish Champion Hurdle) at Leopardstown just 7 days later. He won eased down, defeating amongst others the previous year's Champion Hurdle winner, Winning Fair. The race was described by author and journalist Ivor Herbert;

"Flyingbolt, two years Arkle's junior, won the Scalp Hurdle in a canter. What made this astonishing was that the five-year-old was beating older experienced high-class hurdlers on worse terms than in a handicap. It was suddenly evident that Dreaper had not only Ireland's top three mile chaser, but, in the two years younger horse, the best novice hurdler either side of the Irish Sea."

From there, Flyingbolt headed to Cheltenham, where he easily won his division of the Gloucestershire Hurdle (now the Supreme Novices' Hurdle), consolidating his position as the top novice hurdler in Britain and Ireland. Later that week, Arkle beat Mill House to win the first of his three consecutive Cheltenham Gold Cups.

A summary of Flyingbolt's 1963/64 season is listed below.

Date	Racecourse	Distance	Race	Jockey	Weight	Going	Odds	Field	Result	Margin
13 May 63	Leopardstown	1 1/2 miles	Maiden Plate (Flat)	L McLoughlin	9–12	Firm	20/1	19	12th	12 lengths
09 Oct 63	Navan	2 miles	Bumper (NH Flat)	Mr A Lillingston	11-9	Good	8/11f	17	1st	7 lengths
23 Nov 63	Leopardstown	2 miles	Cabinteely Plate (Flat)	L McLoughlin	9–10	Soft	9/4f	20	1st	4 lengths
28 Dec 63	Leopardstown	2 miles	Maiden Hurdle	P Taaffe	11–12	Yielding	8/11f	7	1st	3 lengths
08 Feb 64	Baldoyle	2 miles	Killester Hurdle	P Taaffe	12-4	Good	4/9f	19	1st	3 lengths
15 Feb 64	Leopardstown	2 miles	Scalp Hurdle (now the Irish Champion Hurdle)	P Taaffe	11-7	Yielding	3/1	15	1st	2 1/2 lengths
05 Mar 64	Cheltenham	2 miles	Gloucestershire Hurdle (Supreme Novices' Hurdle)	P Taaffe	12-2	Good	4/9f	11	1st	4 lengths

=== Chasing career ===
Flyingbolt was sent chasing in the autumn of 1964. He won all five of his starts, including the 2-mile Champion Novice Chase at Cheltenham (formerly the Cotswold Chase, now the Arkle Challenge Trophy) and his final start at Fairyhouse, where he carried 12 st 2 lbs to victory, giving the second horse 37 lbs. In doing so, he recorded his eleventh consecutive victory from twelve career starts.

Date	Racecourse	Distance	Race	Jockey	Weight	Going	Odds	Field	Result	Margin
21 Nov 64	Leopardstown	2 miles 1f	Sandymount Novice Chase	P Taaffe	12-0	Good	4/11f	4	1st	12 lengths
26 Dec 64	Leopardstown	2 miles	Carrickmines Chase	P Taaffe	11–12	Yielding	2/7f	5	1st	7 lengths
27 Feb 65	Leopardstown	2 miles	Milltown Chase	P Taaffe	12-7	Good	1/2f	8	1st	8 lengths
10 Mar 65	Cheltenham	2 miles	Cotswold Chase (Arkle Challenge Trophy)	P Taaffe	12-4	Firm	4/9f	13	1st	5 lengths
20 Apr 65	Fairyhouse	2 miles 1f	Easter Handicap Chase	P Taaffe	12-2	Good	1/2f	4	1st	1 length

Flyingbolt made his seasonal re-appearance in a handicap hurdle at the Phoenix Park on 2 October 1965, where he finished 4th when conceding 28 lbs and upwards to his rivals. Although he was beaten for the first time in more than two years, the race was primarily a warm-up event prior to the resumption of his chasing career, a sphere in which he remained unbeaten. That season, Flyingbolt won all six of his chases, ranging in distance from 2 miles to 3 and a quarter miles. He began with a victory in the Carey's Cottage Handicap Chase at Gowran Park, winning by 5 lengths, carrying 12 st 2 lbs and giving 32 lbs to the second horse. This was followed by a trip to Ascot in November, where he won the prestigious Black & White Whisky Gold Cup in a canter by 15 lengths (Chaseform: waited with, took lead 3 out, drew clear, impressive).

For the first time in 8 starts over fences, he started at odds-against for the Massey Ferguson Gold Cup at Cheltenham in December. This was his stiffest task to date as he had been allotted 12 st 6 lbs in the race and had to give 25 lbs and more in weight to his 10 rivals, most of whom were top-class handicappers. However, backed in from 5/1 to 5/2 favourite, Flyingbolt took the lead with 3 to jump before drawing away to win by 15 lengths. (Chaseform: took lead 3 out, drew clear, impressive). The Irish Field reported after the race: "There are many who thought that before the big race Flyingbolt was a little behind Arkle; while after his resounding victory they are in no doubt that he is as good." Pat Taaffe described the race in his autobiography My Life and Arkle's:

The ground at Cheltenham had been very heavy when we arrived, but by the time of the race unceasing rain had turned it into a sea of mud. For Flyingbolt, with twelve-stone-six to carry, you just couldn't imagine anything worse...I had Flyingbolt settled down nicely in the middle of the field, relaxed, jumping superbly and biding his time.... Then, as planned, I made my first move going up the hill at the far end of the course and Flyingbolt, unleashed and free, began to fly through the field.... At the top of the hill only Solbina and Scottish Memories were still in front. Flyingbolt went past and away from them, a man running against boys. Rounding the final bend, he was going so easily that he found time to jump a path across the course. He stormed up the hill, increasing the distance between him and his pursuers with every stride, to win by fifteen lengths from Solbina with Scottish Memories third. It was the manner of his victory, rather than the victory itself, that caused the furore. Men remembered that Scottish Memories had met Arkle twice in the previous season and stretched him on both occasions. In this selfsame race, the Massey Ferguson, there had been thirty-three pounds and two lengths between them. And in the Leopardstown Chase, thirty-five pounds and one length. Now Flyingbolt had given him twenty-six pounds and left him sixteen and a half lengths behind. Didn't this prove that Flyingbolt was now every bit as good as his more illustrious stable-mate?

Official ratings were not published back in that era so the first indication of how the Handicapper had reacted to Flyingbolt's performance in the Massey-Ferguson came when he was entered in the Great Yorkshire Handicap Chase at Doncaster the following month. In the race, Flyingbolt was set to carry a stone (14 lbs) more than Mill House, runner-up to Arkle at level weights in both the 1964 and 1965 Cheltenham Gold Cups, which indicated that in official eyes at least, there was very little between the Dreaper pair. However, it was decided instead to stay at home and run Flyingbolt in the Thyestes Handicap Chase at Gowran Park, his first attempt at a trip beyond 2 1/2 miles and where he carried the now customary top weight. He duly obliged, beating Height O'Fashion by a distance (in excess of 30 lengths) whilst giving her 28 lbs, with Flying Wild (who received 29 lbs) another 25 lengths back in third. (Form Book: close up, led and clear approaching straight, canter). By comparison, Arkle failed by a length to give 32 lbs to Flying Wild in the previous season's Massey Ferguson Gold Cup. Author, Ivor Herbert, remarked in his book, Arkle, The Story of a Champion, that "Flyingbolt slaughtered his field in ground so heavy that one fence had to be cut out and revived speculation about his rating with Arkle. And something the great flat trainer Paddy Prendergast said to Pat Taaffe after the race stuck in Taaffe's mind: "Flyingbolt has achieved far more as a seven-year-old than Arkle did at the same age."

Flyingbolt's next race was at the Cheltenham Festival in the 2-mile Champion Chase (now the Queen Mother Champion Chase). He started at odds of 1-5, the shortest price in the history of the race, and he won pulling up by 15 lengths. Said Taaffe in his autobiography; "I had Flyingbolt lobbing behind them still on the bit and then four fences from home we went up to join Flash Bulb. Johnny Haine proceeded to take his fellow down the hill as if for life itself. Flyingbolt just cruised past him, still on a tight rein, and from the second last we went ahead steadily to win very easily indeed with a tired Flash Bulb second, fifteen lengths behind."

Racing historian John Randall of the Racing Post wrote of his victory, "Flyingbolt cantered home in the Champion Chase at odds of 1–5. Trained by Tom Dreaper, this unsung hero was held up by Pat Taaffe, cruised to the front at the second-last, and triumphed with breathtaking ease by 15 lengths from Flash Bulb, with another high-class rival, Flying Wild, third." The comment beside his name in the official form book afterwards summed it up in a few words; "took lead 2 out, canter."

Now approaching the height of his powers it was regrettable that he wasn't given the chance to take on Arkle in the Cheltenham Gold Cup. Because both horses were trained by the same man, this was always unlikely to happen. However, 24 hours after the Champion Chase, Flyingbolt re-appeared in the Champion Hurdle where despite taking on the specialist 2-mile hurdlers, he started favourite at 15–8 but was beaten just over 3 lengths by Salmon Spray. Taaffe was widely criticised for going round the outside and perhaps not letting this proven stayer set a clear lead earlier. It was also particularly noticeable that Flyingbolt was giving too much air to his hurdles rather than jumping them at speed, most likely because he had only just run in the Champion Chase the previous day. As it was, he got too close to the fourth last and lost valuable ground, which may have cost him the race. Taaffe explained in his book:

"I ran him on the longer, outside route to minimize the risk of interference and coming to the fourth last we were sharing the lead with Tamerosia and Kirriemuir. It was then that he made his one mistake, getting right under the hurdle, crashing through, losing impetus and about three lengths as well. I had been hoping to set a fearsome pace down the hill making full use of my fellow's stamina. Still Flyingbolt, as competitive as ever, came again and by the second last he was in front again. A few moments later, I glanced sideways and saw the white face of Salmon Spray poised menacingly at my knee and I think I knew that our race was won and lost. We had never trained Flyingbolt over hurdles, but I believe he could have been a great hurdler. He was the most incredible all-rounder...if born in almost any other age the best horse in the world from two miles to three and a quarter, and perhaps beyond that."

Flyingbolt ended his season with a win when carrying the welter burden of 12 st 7 lbs in the Irish Grand National over three and a quarter miles at Fairyhouse, beating Height O'Fashion (by 2 lengths) and the previous year's winner Splash, giving them 40 lbs and 42 lbs respectively (Form Book: in touch and waited with, led half-way, pushed out run-in, comfortably). When Arkle (carrying 12–0) won the same race 2 years previously, he beat Height O'Fashion by a length and a quarter, giving her 30 lbs, 10 lbs less than Flyingbolt had conceded.

The magnitude of Flyingbolt's achievement can be gauged from the fact that Height O'Fashion had earlier in the season won one of Ireland's premier races, the Troytown Handicap Chase at Navan, carrying the top-weight of 12 stone whilst giving between 25lbs and 35lbs to all of the other runners, only to be comfortably beaten by Flyingbolt in the Irish National a few months later when carrying just 9st 9lbs, almost 3 stone less than Flyingbolt carried in the race. The third horse, Splash, who was beaten 12 lengths, carrying 9-7, exactly 3 stone less than Flyingbolt, also won the Troytown when carrying 11–13 in 1964. Flyingbolt is the only Irish National winner since 1946 to have carried 12–7 to victory and as the conditions of this race have since changed in terms of the top weight, it is unlikely that any weight above 12-0 will be carried in it again.

In their race report, The Irish Field were prompted to say; "We are faced with the amazing and inescapable conclusion that, in theory, he is no more than a pound behind Arkle, and, depending on weather conditions, might even be slightly superior if they met." Taaffe reflected on Flyingbolt's performance in his autobiography when he said:

"Flyingbolt won the 1966 Irish National very easily from Arkle's old rival Height O'Fashion. He settled down beautifully and I was surprised how well he stayed. If top weight worried him, it never showed. He made winning look an easy thing that day. Once again I was reminded that I was alternating between the king and crown prince of chasing. More than ever, it now seemed only a matter of time before he took over from Arkle."

The comparisons continued. Ivor Herbert observed in his book, Arkle, The Story Of A Champion that "Conjecture rustled: on the figures it seemed Arkle was slipping back, or Flyingbolt was soaring upwards; in any case the gap between the two mighty horses from Greenogue was dwindling, dwindling perhaps to equality. And Flyingbolt had two years in hand."

An interesting postscript to the race was that the British Handicapper had already calculated the weights for Sandown's Whitbread Gold Cup prior to the running of the Irish National in which Arkle was set to carry 12-7 and Flyingbolt 12-6 (after his mandatory penalty for winning the National was applied). The only other horse in the handicap proper was What A Myth on 9st 8lbs, one pound above the minimum weight to be carried and a massive 41 lbs less than Arkle (40 lbs less than Flyingbolt). Every other horse in the race was allotted less than 9 stone, an astonishing reflection of Arkle and Flyingbolt's superiority over their closest rivals. What A Myth would go on to win the race in their absence and would subsequently win a Cheltenham Gold Cup, evidence that those rivals were of a very high standard in their own right.

Flyingbolt was now unbeaten in 11 starts over fences. In all, he had won 17 of his 20 races, including wins in three different races at the Cheltenham Festival in consecutive years, a feat not equalled for another 47 years until Bobs Worth achieved the same in 2011, 2012 & 2013, at a time when there was a far bigger selection of races available. At only 7-years-of-age, it was frightening to think of what Flyingbolt might be capable of achieving in the seasons to come.

Date	Racecourse	Distance	Race	Jockey	Weight	Going	Odds	Field	Result	Margin
02 Oct 65	Phoenix Park	2 miles	Peard Cup (Handicap Hurdle)	P Taaffe	12-7	Yielding	1/1f	7	4th	8 lengths
28 Oct 65	Gowran Park	2 1/2 miles	Carey's Cottage Handicap Chase	P Taaffe	12-2	Good	4/5f	4	1st	5 lengths
20 Nov 65	Ascot	2 miles	Black & White Whisky Gold Cup (Chase)	P Taaffe	11-11	Soft	8/15f	7	1st	15 lengths
18 Dec 65	Cheltenham	2 1/2 miles	Massey Ferguson Gold Cup (H'cap Chase)	P Taaffe	12-6	Heavy	5/2f	11	1st	15 lengths
27 Jan 66	Gowran Park	3 miles 1f	Thyestes Handicap Chase	P Taaffe	12-0	Heavy	2/5f	4	1st	30+ lengths
15 Mar 66	Cheltenham	2 miles	Champion Chase	P Taaffe	12-0	Soft	1/5f	6	1st	15 lengths
16 Mar 66	Cheltenham	2 miles	Champion Hurdle	P Taaffe	12-0	Soft	15/8f	17	3rd	3 3/4 lengths
11 Apr 66	Fairyhouse	3 1/4 miles	Irish Grand National (Handicap Chase)	P Taaffe	12-7	Heavy	8/11f	6	1st	2 lengths

=== Illness ===
Flyingbolt was turned out on grass for the summer along with a few other horses and a number of cattle, which had been the policy throughout his racing career to date. During this period, rumours began to surface of the Wilkinsons' eagerness to take on Arkle in the following year's Cheltenham Gold Cup despite their trainer's preference to keep them apart.

In the Autumn of 1966, the British Handicapper released the weights for the 3 big early-season handicaps, namely the Gallaher, Mackeson and Massey-Ferguson Gold Cups in which both Arkle and Flyingbolt were entered. Arkle was set to carry just one pound more than Flyingbolt in all three races with a gap of more than 2-and-a-half stone (35 lbs) to the next horse in the weights.

As the 1966/67 season got under way, Flyingbolt was first on to the stage. The race was the National Hunt Centenary Chase at Cheltenham on 29 October 1966, where he carried 12 st 7 lbs. Although he was giving 21 lbs in weight to the other 4 runners, it was expected to be no more than an exercise canter for Flyingbolt. Starting favourite at 2–7, he appeared to be on his way to victory until suddenly weakening 2 out before finishing 9 lengths third. There was no obvious reason for his surprise defeat but eventually exhaustive tests revealed that he was suffering from Brucellosis, a seriously infectious bacterial disease, more associated with cattle than horses. It was suspected that Flyingbolt may have picked it up during the summer whilst out grazing with the cattle, one or more of which may have been infected. It is routine for cattle which are diagnosed with the disease to be removed from the herd and slaughtered, as their meat cannot be allowed to enter the human food chain.

In terms of the equine, Brucellosis is a debilitating disease which causes inflammation of the joints along with severe muscle soreness, a serious handicap in the training of racehorses. The bacteria causing this disease, Brucella, function as facultative intracellular parasites, causing chronic disease which usually persists for life. In Flyingbolt's case, the only means of tackling the problem back then was through a prolonged period of medical treatment and plenty of rest, after which there was little or no chance of a full recovery. However, Flyingbolt was still a young horse and the hope was that he could recover sufficiently in order to return and win a Cheltenham Gold Cup. Within 2 months of Flyingbolt's setback, Arkle fractured a pedal bone in the King George VI Chase at Kempton Park and never raced again.

=== Return ===
Flyingbolt returned to action a year later but took part in only two races within the space of a month. Carrying 12 st 7 lbs in both, he finished 3rd on his first start at Punchestown (giving 42 lbs to all of the other runners) before finishing a well-beaten 7th in the Mackeson Gold Cup at Cheltenham. After he was subsequently found to be suffering from a recurrence of his illness, Dreaper expressed the wish to retire the horse rather than watch him deteriorate any further as a result of his debilitating condition. However, the owners decided to keep him in training, and when he returned to the track after a further year on the sidelines, he was in the care of Ken Oliver in Scotland. Flyingbolt again ran in only 2 races that season, although he did win one of them when carrying 12 st 7 lbs to victory under Barry Brogan in a handicap chase at Haydock on 3 January 1969 (Chaseform: made all, comfortably). Subsequently ruled out of action for yet another year, he returned to race sparingly for another 2 seasons without ever achieving the same level of form he had shown prior to his illness. In all, he only appeared on the racecourse 5 times between his win in the Irish National in April 1966 and his seasonal debut at Cheltenham in December 1969, almost 4 years later. Other than that, his most notable finish was a second in the King George VI Chase at Kempton on the eve of his 11th birthday, one of the few races in the calendar where he did not have to give lumps of weight away to the opposition. To put this into context, it was the first time in 9 starts that he carried less than 12–7 in a race. His final start, for his latest trainer, Roddy Armytage, came as a twelve-year-old in the Topham Trophy Handicap Chase at Aintree on 1 April 1971 where he carried top-weight but fell for the only time in his career. Despite not being the horse he once was, Flyingbolt left a deep impression on Armytage, as he explained to the Racing Post:

"I rode him work one morning and just for a couple of furlongs you could feel what an astonishing machine he must have been. But after he worked, his joints used to swell up – there was nothing you could do about it."

Jockey Barry Brogan, who rode him to his final victory at Haydock, was Tom Dreaper's assistant and stable amateur during the 1965–1966 season and had ridden both Arkle and Flyingbolt in their work. In his autobiography, he says:

"In my view Flyingbolt was probably the best horse I ever rode – even better than Arkle. I honestly believe that he would have beaten Arkle in the 1966 Gold Cup if Tom Dreaper had allowed him to run."

In a subsequent interview with the Racing Post in December 2008, more than 25 years after the publication of his autobiography, he re-affirmed his comments when he said, "For all Arkle's brilliance, I felt Flyingbolt was the better horse. If Pat Taaffe was alive, he'd tell you the same."

Date	Racecourse	Distance	Race	Jockey	Weight	Going	Odds	Field	Result	Margin
29 Oct 66	Cheltenham	2 1/2 miles	National Hunt Centenary Chase	P Taaffe	12-7	Soft	2/7f	5	3rd	9 lengths
11 Oct 67	Punchestown	2 1/2 miles	Double Diamond Handicap Chase	P Taaffe	12-7	Soft	7/4f	6	3rd	10 lengths
04 Nov 67	Cheltenham	2 1/2 miles	Mackeson Gold Cup (H'cap Chase)	P Taaffe	12-7	Soft	9/4f	13	7th	38 lengths
09 Nov 68	Newcastle	2 miles ½f	Northumbria Handicap Chase	B Brogan	12-7	Soft	7/2jf	7	5th	18 lengths
03 Jan 69	Haydock	2 miles	Gamekeepers Handicap Chase	B Brogan	12-7	Yielding	5/2	4	1st	4 lengths
06 Dec 69	Cheltenham	2 1/2 miles	Massey Ferguson Gold Cup (H'cap Chase)	B Brogan	12-7	Yielding	25/1	11	6th	24 lengths
20 Dec 69	Ascot	2 miles	SGB Handicap Chase	B Brogan	12-7	Soft	5/2f	7	3rd	10 1/2 lengths
26 Dec 69	Kempton	3 miles	King George VI Chase	J Gifford	11-3	Good	4/1	5	2nd	3 lengths
19 Feb 70	Ascot	3 miles	Whitbread Trial Handicap Chase	J Gifford	11-9	Soft	11/2	8	4th	26 1/2 lengths
26 Feb 70	Warwick	2 1/2 miles	Castle Chase	P Ennis	11-7	Soft	10/11f	4	3rd	8 1/2 lengths
29 Jan 71	Kempton	2 miles ½f	Easter Hero Handicap Chase	S Mellor	12-1	Yielding	7/2	4	2nd	12 lengths
26 Feb 71	Kempton	2 1/2 miles	Emblem Handicap Chase	S Mellor	11-10	Good	7/2	7	2nd	2 lengths
18 Mar 71	Cheltenham	2 miles	Cathcart Challenge Cup Chase	D Nicholson	11-3	Heavy	4/1	5	3rd	7 lengths
01 Apr 71	Liverpool	2 3/4 miles	Topham Trophy Handicap Chase	D Nicholson	11-4	Good	8/1	15	Fell	

== Assessment ==
In the end, Arkle and Flyingbolt never met on the racecourse but they did so at home as Pat Taaffe recounted in his book My Life & Arkle's.

Flyingbolt was hacking along with Paddy Woods on his back and a funny look in his eye. Upsides on Arkle, I was thinking to myself that I would never see a prouder horse than this. Then he turned his head and slowly looked us over. You could almost see the curl of the lip. This was the 'Who are these peasants?' look of his that I was to come to know so well and I suppose I should have been forewarned. Next thing I knew he's taken a strong hold and was away. Not to be outdone, Arkle took an equally strong hold and got up alongside. And so these two young chasers who were then potentially the best in the world staged their own private race during what was supposed to be a normal session of morning schooling. They took the next four fences, neck and neck, flat out as though their lives depended on the outcome, while Paddy and I held on to them for dear life and waited for the fires to die down. Well, they cleared them all right, but it was a bit too close for comfort and Mr. Dreaper never allowed them to be schooled together again. In character, they were the night and the day. A small child could walk into Arkle's box in absolute safety. No child, no man would ever willingly step into Flyingbolt's.... at least, not twice. He'd kick the eye out of your head. He had a competitive spirit every bit the equal of Arkle's and be it over jumps or on the flat he was a superb machine and a brave one.... For him, the future was limitless. There were no mountains too high for this one to climb, not even Arkle's.... Certainly he was as good at seven as Arkle was at the same age.... If progress had been maintained, he would have been as good, if not better, than Arkle himself....And if illness hadn't ruined his career, Flyingbolt would have dominated chasing.

Jim Dreaper, Tom's son, was a schoolboy at the time and he recounted his thoughts on both Arkle and Flyingbolt to Hugh McIlvanney 30 years later. "It is foolish to say there can never be another steeplechaser as great as Arkle. There may have been one in the yard along with him. It is impossible to tell how fantastic Flyingbolt might have been if he had not contracted brucellosis."

In an interview with Donn McClean on the Irish Field Podcast, “Leading The Field” in February 2024, Jim Dreaper revealed that “The Handicapper told my father that he could not bring himself to call Flyingbolt the equal of Arkle, he had him one pound below him, but he said that in all honesty he could not split them. And Pat Taaffe said that if it was a 3-mile race on heavy ground he wasn’t sure which he would have ridden, by which I think he meant he would probably have chosen Flyingbolt.”

Tom Taaffe, son of Pat, and a Gold Cup winning trainer himself, remembers: "Daddy always maintained that there was nothing between the two of them. He might have liked Arkle more as a character, and he won three Gold Cups, but there was nothing between them." This would seem to tie in with the comment attributed to Pat in Ivor Herbert's aforementioned book: “I suppose that one day Arkle and Flyingbolt will have to meet. It’ll be a terrible day for me. I couldn’t ride both and one would have to be beaten.”

Timeform said of Flyingbolt "he was almost as good as Arkle at his best" and cite his 1966 victory in the Irish Grand National over Height O'Fashion conceding 40lbs as being good enough to be in the same league as Arkle. In Timeform's list, Flyingbolt is rated 210 compared to Arkle on 212. Next is Sprinter Sacre on 192 with Kauto Star and Mill House on 191.

Brian O'Connor, the Irish Times racing correspondent and author of the 2011 book, Ireland's Greatest Racehorses, wrote of Flyingbolt:

"It's hardly fair that such an immense talent is mostly reduced to a mere footnote in the Arkle story. Whatever you think about Timeform, there are still those around from that golden era who insist that Flyingbolt was Arkle's superior."

Sports broadcaster, commentator and journalist, Hugh Cahill, interviewed trainer, former jockey and racing pundit Ted Walsh about Flyingbolt for his 2018 book "WINNERS" and Walsh had this to say about him:

I would say that Flyingbolt was the best horse I ever saw. Arkle was super and a great horse, he rewrote the history books in terms of handicaps and all of that, but Flyingbolt did everything Arkle did and he did it better. He would carry the big weights and destroy horses. He beat two very good mares – Height O'Fashion and Flying Wild – giving them, not pounds but stones, forty-two pounds in weight, which is three stone. It was unheard of. Twelve-stone-seven he was carrying, and he was sailing away from them. In 1964, Arkle had beaten Height O'Fashion in the Irish National giving her thirty pounds but this fella gave her forty, and beat her more easily. He was a big chestnut horse but he was always in the shadow of Arkle because Arkle was 'The Man' and everyone thought he was unbeatable. It's a bit like a brilliant golfer being in the shadow of Tiger Woods. At that time, there were no conditions races, you had to run in handicaps when you went out of your novice races. In the sixties and seventies there were four big handicap races in Ireland: the Troytown at Navan, the Thyestes at Gowran Park, the Leopardstown Chase and the Irish National at Fairyhouse. Flyingbolt ran in the 1966 Thyestes and he won it in a canter. He won what we now call the Supreme Novices, then he won the Arkle Challenge in 1965. He was an aeroplane. Tom then sent him to the two-mile Queen Mother Champion Chase at Cheltenham and he bolted in. The very next day, he ran in the Champion Hurdle and finished third. If it was the other way around, he would have won both of them. He jumped the hurdles too big in the Hurdle, having run in the Chase the day before. He came back after that and the next time he ran was in the 1966 Irish National at Fairyhouse three weeks later, with twelve-stone-seven on his back over three miles two, and he beat Height O'Fashion. It was unbelievable. I remember thinking at that time there is no way he would beat her giving her three stone. Three stone! But he beat her again. At that time, they rated him one pound behind Arkle, because Arkle was a legend and they obviously couldn't put something above him in the ratings until the horses met – but they never did. I think if they both lined up, Flyingbolt would have won. For a period in his life, he was the best horse I'd ever seen. He achieved such great things as a National Hunt horse. To this day, when people ask me which was the best horse I ever saw run, I tell them that I saw Arkle and I saw Flyingbolt – and that Flyingbolt was the best.

In an interview with the Racing Post in November 2020, Walsh further expressed his thoughts on the Arkle/Flyingbolt debate. "Flyingbolt was the greatest National Hunt horse I ever saw. I've never seen a horse since or before who would have beaten him. He never took on Arkle because they were in the same yard, but I have no doubt he would have ‘eaten’ Arkle."

Horse racing journalist and author, Brough Scott, paid tribute to him in his 2008 book, Of Horses and Heroes, when he said: "More than 40 years on since he first blazed over Cheltenham's fences, it is time we paid Flyingbolt his due as one of the very greatest of them all."

In an article in the Racing Post in March 2009, racing historian John Randall wrote, "In any era except that of Arkle, Flyingbolt would have reigned supreme, but he raced in the shadow of his stablemate and never received the credit he deserved. He was officially rated only one pound below Arkle, and although it defies belief that the two greatest steeplechasers of all time should have been in the same stable at the same time, with the same jockey and even the same groom (Johnny Lumley), the figures speak for themselves."

In a more recent Racing Post article (January 2023), Randall reflected on the achievements of both Arkle and Flyingbolt in comparison to their latter day contemporaries:

"The modern jumps scene would be almost unrecognisable to a time-travelling racegoer from the 1960's who saw the two greatest steeplechasers of all time, stablemates Arkle and Flyingbolt. Some have questioned the validity of the Dreaper pair's sky-high ratings but the reason for them is simple: they were forced to demonstrate the full extent of their greatness by conceding up to three stone (42lbs) in handicaps to rivals who were of normal Gold Cup standard. Modern champions do not run in handicaps, and are therefore not tested to that extent."

Randall’s comments are justified on the basis that the 3 Cheltenham Gold Cups of 1967, 1968 and 1969, run in the absence of both Arkle and Flyingbolt due to injury and illness respectively, were won by Woodland Venture, What A Myth and Fort Leney. All 3 started in the 1967 Gold Cup which resulted in victory for Woodland Venture who beat What A Myth into third place by two and three-quarter lengths with Fort Leney a well beaten fifth. As a form guideline, taken from the 1966 Whitbread Gold Cup run at Sandown on the final day of the previous season, What A Myth was set to receive 41 lbs from Arkle and 40 lbs from Flyingbolt in the original handicap. Although neither of the Dreaper pair took part, it reflected the official handicapper’s view of the huge gap in class between the big two and the rest, which included 3 future winners of the Cheltenham Gold Cup.

In comparing Arkle and Flyingbolt, Randall noted that "Arkle became a folk hero, celebrated in song, poetry, drama and legend, so it is hard to believe he had a stablemate who was his equal – but a strict assessment, crucially forged in handicaps, suggests that may have been true."

When the Racing Post conducted a readers' poll in 2004 to determine the 100 favourite racehorses of all time, Arkle, predictably, was number one whilst Flyingbolt didn't even make the list, lending credence to Randall's assertion that Flyingbolt was indeed "racing's greatest unsung hero."

== Retirement ==
Flyingbolt was retired in 1971 and spent the latter days of his life on a farm in Oxfordshire in the company of former stablemate Fort Leney, a winner of the Cheltenham Gold Cup in 1968.

Flyingbolt died in 1983 at the age of 24.

== See also ==
- List of racehorses
