= Irish jump racing Champion Jockey =

Irish jockey competition

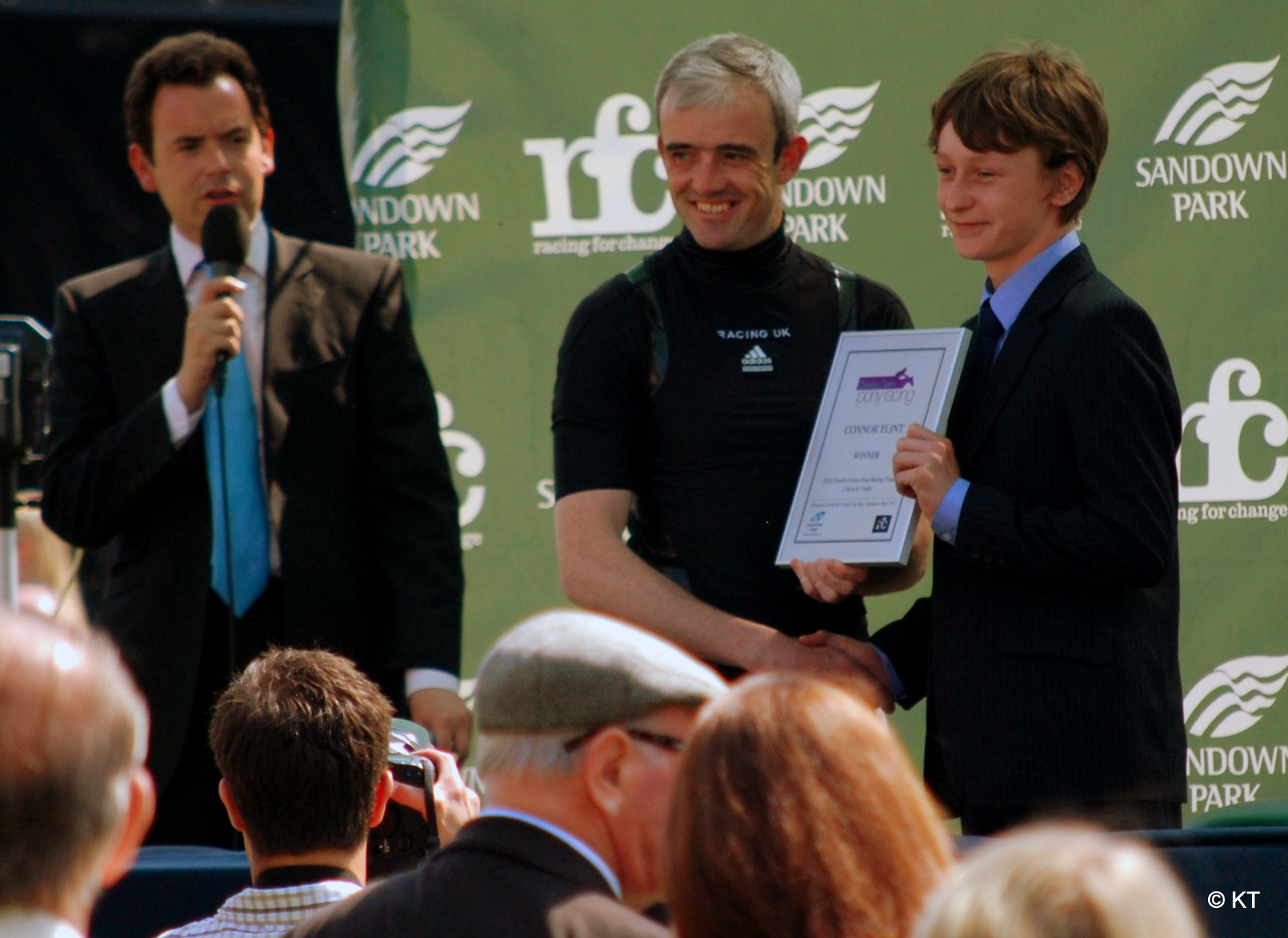
Ruby Walsh (centre), multiple champion jockey, presenting an award to pony racing champion Connor Flint

The Champion Jockey of National Hunt racing in Ireland is the jockey who has ridden the most winning horses during a season. The list below shows the Champion Jockey for each year since 1946. The current champion, as of 2026, is Jack Kennedy

== Champion Jockeys since 1946 ==
- 1946 – Martin Molony
- 1947 – Martin Molony
- 1948 – Martin Molony
- 1949 – Martin Molony
- 1950 – Martin Molony
- 1951 – Martin Molony
- 1952 – Pat Taaffe
- 1953 – Pat Taaffe
- 1954 – Pat Taaffe
- 1955 – Pat Taaffe
- 1956 – Toss Taaffe
- 1957 – Toss Taaffe
- 1958 – Bobby Beasley
- 1959 – Bobby Beasley
- 1960 – Bobby Beasley
- 1961 – Pat Taaffe
- 1962 – Francis Shortt & Pat Taaffe
- 1963 – Bobby Coonan, Tony Redmond, Francis Shortt & Pat Taaffe
- 1964 – Pat Taaffe
- 1965 – B Hannon
- 1966 – Pat Taaffe
- 1967 – Bobby Coonan
- 1968 – Bobby Coonan
- 1969 – Bobby Coonan
- 1970 – Bobby Coonan
- 1971 – Bobby Coonan
- 1972 – Bobby Coonan
- 1973 – Tommy Carberry
- 1974 – Tommy Carberry
- 1975 – Frank Berry & Tommy Carberry
- 1976 – Tommy Carberry
- 1977 – Frank Berry
- 1978 – Frank Berry
- 1979 – Joe Byrne
- 1980 – Frank Berry
- 1981 – Frank Berry
- 1982 – Frank Berry
- 1983 – Frank Berry
- 1984 – Frank Berry & Tony Mullins
- 1985 – Tommy Carmody
- 1986 – Frank Berry & Tom Morgan
- 1987 – Frank Berry
- 1988 – Tommy Carmody
- 1989–90 – Charlie Swan
- 1990–91 – Charlie Swan
- 1991–92 – Charlie Swan
- 1992–93 – Charlie Swan
- 1993–94 – Charlie Swan
- 1994–95 – Charlie Swan
- 1995–96 – Charlie Swan - 147
- 1996–97 – Charlie Swan
- 1997–98 – Charlie Swan
- 1998–99 – Ruby Walsh
- 1999–00 – Barry Geraghty
- 2000–01 – Ruby Walsh – 84
- 2001–02 – Paul Carberry – 109
- 2002–03 – Paul Carberry – 106
- 2003–04 – Barry Geraghty – 110
- 2004–05 – Ruby Walsh – 111
- 2005–06 – Ruby Walsh – 90
- 2006–07 – Ruby Walsh – 125
- 2007–08 – Ruby Walsh – 131
- 2008–09 – Ruby Walsh – 121
- 2009–10 – Ruby Walsh – 108
- 2010–11 – Paul Townend – 80
- 2011–12 – Davy Russell – 104
- 2012–13 – Davy Russell – 103
- 2013–14 – Ruby Walsh – 122
- 2014–15 – Ruby Walsh – 79
- 2015–16 – Ruby Walsh – 105
- 2016–17 – Ruby Walsh – 131
- 2017–18 – Davy Russell – 119
- 2018–19 – Paul Townend – 109
- 2019–20 – Paul Townend – 105
- 2020–21 – Paul Townend - 100
- 2021–22 – Paul Townend - 84
- 2022–23 – Paul Townend - 107
- 2023-24 – Jack Kennedy - 123
- 2024–25 – Paul Townend - 108
- 2025-26 – Jack Kennedy - 102

== Records ==
- Most titles – 12, Ruby Walsh
- Most consecutive titles – 9, Charlie Swan
- Most wins in a season – 147, Charlie Swan

== See also ==
- British jump racing Champion Jockey
- Irish flat racing Champion Jockey
