= 1970 Grand National =

English steeplechase horse race

- Grand National
- Location: Aintree
- Date: 4 April 1970
- Winning horse: Gay Trip
- Starting price: 15/1
- Jockey: Pat Taaffe
- Trainer: Fred Rimell
- Owner: Tony Chambers
- Conditions: Good

External videos
- The 1970 Grand National in full (BBC)
- Highlights of the 1970 Grand National, followed by 1971 and 1972 BBC Sport

The 1970 Grand National was the 124th renewal of the Grand National horse race that took place at Aintree near Liverpool, England, on 4 April 1970. Gay Trip won the race by 20 lengths, giving jockey Pat Taaffe his second winner. Only seven horses finished the race and Racoon was a fatality at the 3rd fence.

== Finishing order ==
Position	Name	Jockey	Age	Handicap (st-lb)	SP	Distance
01	Gay Trip	Pat Taaffe	8	11-5	15/1	
02	Vulture	Sean Barker	8	10-0	15/1	
03	Miss Hunter	Frank Shortt	9	10-0	33/1	
04	Dozo	Eddie Harty	9	10-4	100/8	
05	Ginger Nut	Jimmy Bourke	8	10-0	28/1	
06	Pride of Kentucky	John Buckingham	8	10-0	13/1	
07	Assad	Josh Gifford	10	10-1	28/1	Last to finish

== Non-finishers ==
Fence	Name	Jockey	Age	Handicap (st-lb)	Starting price	Fate
01	Perry Hill	Paul Kelleway	11	10-0	28/1	Fell
03	Battledore	Stan Murphy	9	10-5	25/1	Brought Down
03	Game Purston	Michael Lloyd	12	11-5	100/1	Unseated Rider
03	On The Move	Gerald Dartnall	8	10-1	100/1	Fell
03	Permit	Pat Buckley	7	10-3	35/1	Brought Down
03	Racoon	David Mould	8	10/3	33/1	Fell
03	Rondetto	Jeff King	14	10-5	22/1	Unseated Rider
03	The Beeches	Stan Mellor	10	10-0	22/1	Fell
03	Two Springs	Roy Edwards	8	10-7	13/2	Fell
04	Persian Helen	Dessie Hughes	7	10-0	35/1	Refused
04	Queen's Guide	Mr G Wade	9	10-0	40/1	Brought Down
08	French Excuse	Ken White	8	10-2	100/8	Fell
10	Bowgeeno	Johnny Haine	10	10-13	22/1	Fell
10	Fort Ord	Andy Turnell	10	10-5	50/1	Fell
11	Red Alligator	Brian Fletcher	11	10-12	13/1	Fell
19	All Glory	Arthur Moore	9	10-0	50/1	Fell
22	No Justice	Joe Guest	9	10-0	50/1	Refused
22	Specify	John Cook	8	10-7	100/7	Brought Down
22	The Fossa	Willie Robinson	13	10-0	50/1	Refused
22	The Otter	Buck Jones	9	10-1	20/1	Fell
27	Villay	Derek Scott	12	10-0	100/1	Unseated Rider

== Media coverage ==
David Coleman presented the eleventh Grand National Grandstand (his tenth) on the BBC. Peter O'Sullevan and Julian Wilson were the two commentators - Wilson commentating from the first fence to the Anchor Bridge crossing.
