= Peter Casey (horse trainer) =

Irish horse trainer

Personal information
- Born: 6 August 1935 Dublin, Ireland
- Died: 27 January 2018 (aged 82)
- Occupation: Trainer
- Spouse: Junie (m. 1962)

Horse racing career
- Sport: Horse racing
- Career wins: ?

Major racing wins
- Powers Gold Cup; Arkle Novice Chase

Significant horses
- Fingal Rock; Flemenstar

Peter Casey (6 August 1935 – 27 January 2018) was an Irish horse trainer.

He trained at Stamullen, County Meath. Casey bred Hello Bud, who was fifth in the Aintree Grand National in 2010.

== Television outburst ==
In January 2012, Casey enjoyed his first Grade One success when Flemenstar captured the Arkle Novice Chase at Leopardstown Racecourse. Following Flemenstar's victory he was interviewed on live television by RTÉ's Tracy Piggott. He shocked Piggott by declaring "It's unreal, I can't believe it". I'll have fecking sex tonight and everything." The incident swiftly became an internet sensation. Within one day a clip on YouTube received in the region of 130,000 hits In addition, it briefly trended on Twitter.

== Personal life ==
Casey and his wife Junie celebrated their golden wedding anniversary during Easter 2012.

== Death ==
Casey died on 27 January 2018, aged 82.
