= Footpad (horse) =

French-bred Thoroughbred racehorse

- Sire: Creachadoir
- Dam: Willamina
- Damsire: Sadler's Wells
- Sex: Gelding
- Foaled: 27 February 2012
- Country: France
- Colour: Bay
- Breeder: Mlle Louise Collet & Mlle Camille Collet
- Owner: Harold A Via Jr
- Trainer: Jack Fisher
- Record: 27:11,5,4
- Earnings: £656,386

Major wins
- Spring Juvenile Hurdle (2016); Prix Alain du Breil (2016); Racing Post Novice Chase (2017); Arkle Novice Chase (2018); Arkle Challenge Trophy (2018); Ryanair Novice Chase (2018)

Footpad (foaled 27 February 2012) is a French thoroughbred racehorse who won multiple Grade 1 races in Great Britain, Ireland and France.

== Career ==
Footpad was bred in France and began his racing career with Robert Collet with two runs at Auteuil.

In 2015 he was sold and transferred to training with Willie Mullins in Ireland. His first run in Ireland at Gowran Park was success in a Maiden. He would go on to win two more races in Ireland, before finishing third in the 2016 JCB Triumph Hurdle at Cheltenham.

After a fall at Aintree in the Betfred Anniversary 4-Y-O Juvenile Hurdle, Footpad won twice in France at Auteuil including the Grade 1 Prix Alain du Breil.

Mixed form followed with placed finishes in the Ryanair Hurdle and Irish Champion Hurdle at Leopardstown and a fourth place in the 2017 Champion Hurdle.

After the summer break, Footpad returned at Navan in a beginners chase winning by 11 lengths. This started a four Grade 1 race victory sequence including the Racing Post Novice Chase, Arkle Novice Chase , Arkle Challenge Trophy and the Ryanair Novice Chase .

Going into late 2018, Footpad returned to racing at Naas but struggled to find form and had an extended break after an eighth-place finish in the 2019 Ryanair Chase at Cheltenham. A further win would follow in November 2019 at Thurles, before two final runs in the colours of Simon Munir & Isaac Souede.

In February 2020, Footpad was sold to race in America. His first run came at Percy Warner Park in the Iroquois Steeplechase where he fell.
