= Taquin Du Seuil =

French-bred Thoroughbred racehorse

- Sire: Voix Du Nord
- Dam: Sweet Laly
- Damsire: Marchand De Sable
- Sex: Gelding
- Foaled: 2 May 2007
- Country: France
- Colour: Bay
- Breeder: Marc Boudot
- Owner: Martin Broughton & Friends 1
- Trainer: Jonjo O'Neill
- Record: 36:10,6,5
- Earnings: £369,775

Major wins
- Challow Novices Hurdle (2012); JLT Novices Chase (2014); BetVictor Gold Cup (2016)

Taquin Du Seuil (2 May 2007 - 26 January 2018) was a French thoroughbred racehorse.

He was a multiple time Cheltenham winner, including the BetVictor Gold Cup and JLT Chase.

== Career ==
Taquin Du Seuil was bred in France and ran for owner/breeder Marc Boudot on a number of occasions at courses including Longchamp, Deauville and Vichy. During this time he did not win any races.

In October 2012, Taquin Du Seuil was moved to the UK under ownership of Sir Martin Broughton. Jonjo O'Neill took over training duties and Taquin Du Seuil won his first race at Uttoxeter.

Two more wins in the next three races followed, including the Grade 1 Challow_Novices'_Hurdle at Newbury Racecourse, before he finished sixth of eight in the Neptune Investment Management Novices Hurdle at the Cheltenham Festival.

For the 2013–14 National Hunt season, Taquin Du Seuil returned at Ffos Las and later Cheltenham during the November meeting winning both times. Good results, including winning a Grade 2 at Haydock Park in January, followed before winning arguably the biggest race of his career at the Cheltenham Festival - the JLT Chase in 2014 ridden by champion jockey AP McCoy.

His form following that win was mixed, with his next win not coming until February 2016 at Warwick. He would go on to finish sixth in the Ryanair Chase that year.

In November, Taquin Du Seuil once again ran at Cheltenham and won the Grade 3 BetVictor Gold Cup. This was the final win of his career. Second place in the 2017 Coral Cup would be a highlight.

On 26 January 2018, whilst racing at Huntingdon, Taquin Du Seuil was involved in a fatal fall.
