= Liberty Counsel (horse) =

Irish racehorse

Liberty Counsel is an Irish bred racehorse that won the Irish Grand National in 2013. This mare was considered a long shot, having lost at Cheltenham a few weeks earlier. She was born March 23, 2003, out of My Free Mantel Vii, and by Leading Counsel.

Liberty Counsel, which was trained by Dot Love and ridden by Ben Dalton, won by half a length at a starting price of 50–1.
