= Gay Trip =

British-bred Thoroughbred racehorse

- Sire: Vulgan
- Grandsire: Sirlan
- Dam: Turkish Tourist
- Damsire: Turkhan
- Sex: Gelding
- Foaled: 1962
- Country: United Kingdom
- Colour: Bay
- Breeder: F. D. Farmer
- Owner: Tony Chambers
- Trainer: Fred Rimell

Major wins
- Mackeson Gold Cup (1969 and 1971); Grand National (1970)

Gay Trip was a racehorse noted for winning the 1970 Grand National.

Gay Trip was a small bay gelding owned by Tony Chambers and trained by Fred Rimell. Formerly a flat racing horse, Gay Trip was switched to National Hunt racing as a five-year-old and won the Mackeson Gold Cup in 1969. In the 1970 Grand National he was ridden by Pat Taaffe after his regular jockey Terry Biddlecombe was ruled out of the race by injury. Gay Trip carried top weight of 11 stones five pounds despite previously never having won a race longer than 2 1/2 miles and started at odds of 15/1 in a field of twenty-eight runners. He took the lead at the second last fence and drew clear to win by twenty lengths. Since 1970 only Red Rum has won the Grand National carrying top weight.

It was Fred Rimell's third national winner having previously won with E.S.B. and Nicolaus Silver.

In 1972 he finished second in the Grand National, ridden by Biddlecombe.
