= Height O'Fashion =

Irish racehorse

Height O'Fashion was an Irish racehorse from the 1960s who was a great rival to Arkle and Flyingbolt. The horse was owned by Jack Donohue.

Height O'Fashion won the Irish Cesarewitch in 1962 under trainer Paddy Mullins, father to trainer Willie Mullins. Height O'Fashion was second to Arkle in the Leopardstown Chase in 1966 in the first occasion in which Arkle was involved in a photo finish for a win.
