= Roy Cambidge =

British horse trainer

- Born: 1923
- Died: April 2009 (aged 85–86)
- Occupation: racing horse trainer

Roy Cambidge (1923 – 8 April 2009) was a British racing horse trainer from Shropshire, England. His most notable feat was winning three races, over hurdles, on the flat, and over fences, on three consecutive racing days in 1973, with the horse Threadbare.

Cambidge also had two Cheltenham Festival winners in 1976.
