= Irish Grand National =

Irish National Hunt steeplechase

- Class: Grade A
- Location: Fairyhouse; County Meath, Ireland
- Inaugurated: 1870
- Race type: Steeplechase
- Sponsor: Boylesports

Race information
- Distance: 3m 5f (5,834 metres)
- Surface: Turf
- Track: Right-handed
- Qualification: Five-years-old and up
- Weight: Handicap
- Purse: €500,000 (2019); 1st: €270,000

Irish Grand National Chase
2026
Soldier In Milan	Showurappreciation	The Enabler

Previous years
2025
Haiti Couleurs	Any Second Now	Quai De Bourbon
2024
Intense Raffles	Any Second Now	Minella Cocooner
2023
I Am Maximus	Gevrey	Defi Bleu
2022
Lord Lariat	Frontal Assault	Gaillard Du Mesnil
2021
Freewheelin Dylan	Run Wild Fred	Enjoy D'allen

2020-2011
2019
Burrows Saint	Isleofhopendreams	Acapella Bourgeois
2018
General Principle	Isleofhopendreams	Forever Gold
2017
Our Duke	Bless The Wings	Abolitionist
2016
Rogue Angel	Bless The Wings	Ballyadam Approach
2015
Thunder And Roses	Rule The World	Sizing Coal
2014
Shutthefrontdoor	Golden Wonder	Saoirse Dun
2013
Liberty Counsel	Away We Go	Home Farm
2012
Lion Na Bearnai	Out Now	Alfie Sherrin
2011
Organisedconfusion	Western Charmer	Sunnyhillboy

2010-2001
2010
Bluesea Cracker	Oscar Time	Whatuthink
2009
Niche Market	Church Island	A New Story
2008
Hear The Echo	Royal County Star	Notre Pere
2007
Butler's Cabin	Nine De Sivola	American Jennie
2006
Point Barrow	Oulart	A New Story
2005
Numbersixvalverde	Jack High	Marcus Du Berlais
2004
Granit d'Estruval	Marcus Du Berlais	Golden Storm
2003
Timbera	Knock Knock	Winning Dream
2002
The Bunny Boiler	Give Over	Northern Sound
2001
Davids Lad	Rathbawn Prince	Sheltering

2000-1991
2000
Commanche Court	Foxchapel King	Irish Light
1999
Glebe Lad	Feathered Leader	Manus The Man
1998
Bobbyjo	Papillon	Call It A Day
1997
Mudahim	Amble Speedy	The Grey Monk
1996
Feathered Gale	Jodami	Cool Dawn
1995
Flashing Steel	Rust Never Sleeps	Feathered Gale
1994
Son Of War	Nuaffe	Ebony Jane
1993
Ebony Jane	Rust Never Sleeps	Zeta's Lad
1992
Vanton	Over The Road	River Tarquin
1991
Omerta	Cahervillahow	Cool Ground

1990-1988
1990
Desert Orchid	Barney Burnett	Have A Barney
1989
Maid Of Money	Candy Well	Have A Barney
1988
Perris Valley	Captain Batnac	Feltrim Hill Lad

The Irish Grand National is a National Hunt steeplechase in Ireland which is open to horses aged five years or older. It is run at Fairyhouse over a distance of about 3 miles and 5 furlongs (5,834 metres), and during its running there are twenty-four fences to be jumped. It is a handicap race, and it is scheduled to take place each year on Easter Monday.

It is the Irish equivalent of the Grand National, and it is held during Fairyhouse's Easter Festival meeting.

== History ==
The event was established in 1870, and the inaugural running was won by a horse called Sir Robert Peel. The race took place at its present venue, and the winner's prize money was 167 sovereigns. In the early part of its history it was often won by horses trained at the Curragh, and there were ten such winners by 1882. The Easter Monday fixture regularly attracted racegoers from Dublin, and it became known as the Dubs' Day Out.

Several winners of the Irish Grand National have also won its English counterpart at Aintree, but none in the same year. The first to complete the double was Ascetic's Silver, the winner of the latter version in 1906. The feat has been achieved more recently by Rhyme 'n' Reason, Bobbyjo, Numbersixvalverde and I Am Maximus. The most successful horse in the event's history is Brown Lad, a three-time winner in the 1970s.

Since 1991, the distance of the race has been 3 miles and 5 furlongs; previously it had been 3 miles and 4 furlongs.

The Irish Grand National was sponsored by Irish Distillers under various titles for many years up to 2010. Ladbrokes sponsored the race from 2011 to 2013. In 2014, Boylesports took over as Irish Grand National sponsor and appointed the jockey Barry Geraghty as the first ever ambassador for the race, promoting the race through various channels, including social media.

== Records ==
Most successful horse (3 wins):
- Brown Lad – 1975, 1976, 1978

Leading jockey (6 wins):

- Pat Taaffe – Royal Approach (1954), Umm (1955), Zonda (1959), Fortria (1961), Arkle (1964), Flyingbolt (1966)

Leading trainer (10 wins):

- Tom Dreaper – Prince Regent (1942), Shagreen (1949), Royal Approach (1954), Olympia (1960), Fortria (1961), Kerforo (1962), Last Link (1963), Arkle (1964), Splash (1965), Flyingbolt (1966)

A Unique Racing Record - Only Owner to complete the Derby and Grand National Double

- William Brophy, Herbertstown House, Two-Mile-House, Naas, County Kildare. Farmer, Breeder and Owner
In 1880 William Brophy completed a unique double by owning the winner of both the Irish Derby with King of the Bees and the Irish Grand National with Controller. Also uniquely both winners were out of the same Dam Winged Bee.

== Winners since 1946 ==
- Weights given in stones and pounds.

Year	Winner	Age	Weight	Jockey	Trainer
1946	Golden View II	11	12-07	Martin Molony	R O'Connell
1947	Revelry	7	11-05	Dan Moore	J Doyle
1948	Hamstar	8	09-07	E Kennedy	Willie O'Grady
1949	Shagreen	8	10-00	E Newman	Tom Dreaper
1950	Dominick's Bar	6	10-06	Martin Molony	Tim Hyde
1951	Icy Calm	8	10-03	P Doyle	Willie O'Grady
1952	Alberoni	9	10-01	L Stephens	Vincent O'Brien
1953	Overshadow	13	10-04	A Power	C Magnier
1954	Royal Approach	6	12-00	Pat Taaffe	Tom Dreaper
1955	Umm	8	10-05	Pat Taaffe	G Wells
1956	Air Prince	12	10-00	T O'Brien	J McClintock
1957	Kilballyown	10	09-10	Willie Robinson	P Norris
1958	Gold Legend	8	09-07	J Lehane	J Brogan
1959	Zonda	8	10-06	Pat Taaffe	Matt Geraghty
1960	Olympia	6	09-11	Toss Taaffe	Tom Dreaper
1961	Fortria	9	09-12	Pat Taaffe	Tom Dreaper
1962	Kerforo	8	10-03	Liam McLoughlin	Tom Dreaper
1963	Last Link	7	09-09	Paddy Woods	Tom Dreaper
1964	Arkle	7	12-00	Pat Taaffe	Tom Dreaper
1965	Splash	7	10-13	Paddy Woods	Tom Dreaper
1966	Flyingbolt	7	12-07	Pat Taaffe	Tom Dreaper
1967	Vulpine	6	11-06	Matt Curran	Paddy Mullins
1968	Herring Gull	6	11-06	John Crowley	Paddy Mullins
1969	Sweet Dreams	8	09-10	Bobby Coonan	Kevin Bell
1970	Garoupe	6	09-09	Cathal Finnegan	Francis Flood
1971	Kings Sprite	9	09-13	Arthur Moore	Georgie Wells
1972	Dim Wit	7	10-13	Matt Curran	Paddy Mullins
1973	Tartan Ace	6	09-07	Jackie Cullen	Tom Costello
1974	Colebridge	10	11-12	Eddie Wright	Jim Dreaper
1975	Brown Lad	9	10-05	Tommy Carberry	Jim Dreaper
1976	Brown Lad	10	12-02	Tommy Carberry	Jim Dreaper
1977	Billycan	7	10-00	Mouse Morris	Adrian Maxwell
1978	Brown Lad	12	12-02	Gerry Dowd	Jim Dreaper
1979	Tied Cottage	11	10-12	Tony Robinson (Note: amateur jockey)	Dan Moore
1980	Daletta	7	11-04	John Harty	Guy Williams
1981	Luska	7	09-09	T. V. Finn	Paddy Mullins
1982	King Spruce	8	10-02	Gerry Newman	Michael O'Brien
1983	Bit of a Skite	7	09-07	Tommy Ryan	Edward O'Grady
1984	Bentom Boy	9	09-09	Ann Ferris	Willie Rooney
1985	Rhyme 'n' Reason	6	10-06	Graham Bradley	David Murray Smith
1986	Insure	8	09-07	Mickey Flynn	Pat Hughes
1987	Brittany Boy	8	10-10	Tom Taaffe	Kelvin Hitchmough
1988	Perris Valley	7	10-00	Brendan Sheridan	Dermot Weld
1989	Maid of Money	7	11-06	Anthony Powell	John Fowler
1990	Desert Orchid	11	12-00	Richard Dunwoody	David Elsworth
1991	Omerta	11	10-09	Adrian Maguire	Martin Pipe
1992	Vanton	8	10-11	Jason Titley	Michael O'Brien
1993	Ebony Jane	8	10-07	Charlie Swan	Francis Flood
1994	Son of War	7	10-10	Francis Woods	Peter McCreery
1995	Flashing Steel	10	12-00	Jamie Osborne	John Mulhern
1996	Feathered Gale	9	10-00	Francis Woods	Arthur Moore
1997	Mudahim	11	10-03	Jason Titley	Jenny Pitman
1998	Bobbyjo	8	11-03	Paul Carberry	Tommy Carberry
1999	Glebe Lad	7	10-00	Tom Rudd	Michael O'Brien
2000	Commanche Court	7	11-04	Ruby Walsh	Ted Walsh
2001	Davids Lad	7	10-00	Timmy Murphy	Tony Martin
2002	The Bunny Boiler	8	09-09	Ross Geraghty	Noel Meade
2003	Timbera	9	10-12	Jim Culloty	Dessie Hughes
2004	Granit d'Estruval	10	10-00	Brian Harding	Ferdy Murphy
2005	Numbersixvalverde	9	10-01	Ruby Walsh	Martin Brassil
2006	Point Barrow	8	10-08	Philip Carberry	Pat Hughes
2007	Butler's Cabin	7	10-04	Tony McCoy	Jonjo O'Neill
2008	Hear the Echo	7	10-00	Paddy Flood	Mouse Morris
2009	Niche Market	8	10-05	Harry Skelton	Bob Buckler
2010	Bluesea Cracker	8	10-04	Andrew McNamara	James Motherway
2011	Organisedconfusion	6	09-13	Nina Carberry	Arthur Moore
2012	Lion Na Bearnai	10	10-05	Andrew Thornton	Thomas Gibney
2013	Liberty Counsel	10	09-05	Ben Dalton	Dot Love
2014	Shutthefrontdoor	7	10-13	Barry Geraghty	Jonjo O'Neill
2015	Thunder And Roses	7	10-06	Katie Walsh	Sandra Hughes
2016	Rogue Angel	8	10-06	Ger Fox	Mouse Morris
2017	Our Duke	7	11-04	Robbie Power	Jessica Harrington
2018	General Principle	9	10-00	JJ Slevin	Gordon Elliott
2019	Burrows Saint	6	10-08	Ruby Walsh	Willie Mullins
2020	no race (Note: The 2020 running was cancelled due to the COVID-19 pandemic in the Republic of Ireland)
2021	Freewheelin Dylan	9	10-08	Ricky Doyle	Dermot McLoughlin
2022	Lord Lariat	7	09-12	PJ O'Hanlon	Dermot McLoughlin
2023	I Am Maximus	7	11-01	Paul Townend	Willie Mullins
2024	Intense Raffles	6	11-04	JJ Slevin	Thomas Gibney
2025	Haiti Couleurs	8	10-13	Sean Bowen	Rebecca Curtis
2026	Soldier In Milan	7	11-00	Donagh Meyler	Emmet Mullins

== Earlier winners ==
- 1870 – Sir Robert Peel
- 1871 – The Doe
- 1872 – Scots Grey
- 1873 – Torrent
- 1874 – Sailor
- 1875 – Scots Grey
- 1876 – Grand National
- 1877 – Thiggin-Thue
- 1878 – Juggler
- 1879 – Jupiter Tonans
- 1880 – Controller
- 1881 – Antoinette
- 1882 – Chantilly
- 1883 – The Gift
- 1884 – The Gift
- 1885 – Billet Doux
- 1886 – Castle Lucas
- 1887 – Eglentine
- 1888 – The Maroon
- 1889 – The Citadel
- 1890 – Greek Girl
- 1891 – Old Tom
- 1892 – Springfield Maid
- 1893 – Thurles
- 1894 – The Admiral
- 1895 – Yellow Girl II
- 1896 – Royston Crow
- 1897 – Breemount's Pride
- 1898 – Porridge
- 1899 – Princess Hilda
- 1900 – Mavis of Meath
- 1901 – Tipperary Boy
- 1902 – Patlander
- 1903 – Kirko
- 1904 – Ascetic's Silver
- 1905 – Red Lad
- 1906 – Brown Bess
- 1907 – Sweet Cecil
- 1908 – Lord Rivers
- 1909 – Little Hack II
- 1910 – Oniche
- 1911 – Repeator II
- 1912 – Small Polly
- 1913 – Little Hack II
- 1914 – Civil War
- 1915 – Punch
- 1916 – All Sorts
- 1917 – Pay Only
- 1918 – Ballyboggan
- 1919 – no race
- 1920 – Halston
- 1921 – Bohernore
- 1922 – Halston
- 1923 – Be Careful
- 1924 – Kilbarry
- 1925 – Dog Fox
- 1926 – Amberwave
- 1927 – Jerpoint
- 1928 – Don Sancho
- 1929 – Alike
- 1930 – Fanmond
- 1931 – Impudent Barney
- 1932 – Copper Court
- 1933 – Red Park
- 1934 – Poolgowran
- 1935 – Rathfriland
- 1936 – Alice Maythorn
- 1937 – Pontet
- 1938 – Clare County
- 1939 – Shaun Peel
- 1940 – Jack Chaucer
- 1941 – no race
- 1942 – Prince Regent
- 1943 – Golden Jack
- 1944 – Knight's Crest
- 1945 – Heirdom

== See also ==
- Horse racing in Ireland
- List of Irish National Hunt races
- Ulster Grand National
- Scotland Grand National
- Welsh Grand National
