= Martin Molony =

Irish jockey (1925–2017)

Personal information
- Born: 20 July 1925 County Limerick, Ireland
- Died: 10 July 2017 (aged 91) Ireland
- Occupation: Jockey

Horse racing career
- Sport: Horse racing

Major racing wins
- National Hunt wins: Irish Grand National (1944, 1946, 1950); Cheltenham Gold Cup (1951); Irish Classic wins: Irish Oaks (1947); Irish 2,000 Guineas (1951); Irish 1,000 Guineas (1950)

Racing awards
- Irish Champion Jockey (1945, 1946, 1947, 1948, 1949, 1950, 1951)

Martin Molony (20 July 1925 – 10 July 2017) was an Irish jockey.

== Jockey ==
Initially, Molony was apprenticed to Martin Hartigan. When WW2 began he returned to Ireland. He rode his first winner for George Harris at the Curragh on merely his third mount. Molony was retained by Lord Bicester to ride his horses in England. He regularly commuted between Ireland and England. He had a thirty three per cent strike rate in England.

=== Flat ===
Molony captured the Irish Oaks on Desert Drive in 1947. Molony rode Princess Trudy to win the Irish 1,000 Guineas in 1950. That year he also finished third in The Oaks on Stella Polaris. The following year he was victorious the Irish 2,000 Guineas with Signal Box. He rode Signal Box in the 1951 Epsom Derby where the horse finished third to Arctic Prince.

=== Jumps ===
Molony won three Irish Grand Nationals (Knight's Crest in 1944, Golden View in 1946 and Dominick's Bar in 1950). In 1950 he won aboard Dominick's Bar, a six-year-old gelding, finishing two length ahead of Stormhead, and beating three-time Cheltenham Gold Cup winner Cottage Rake. In March 1951, he won a Cheltenham Gold Cup on Silver Fame; the pairing also won two other races at the festival.

=== Retirement ===
Later in 1951, Molony was forced to retire at the age of 26 following a fall at Thurles on Bursary. He returned to his native Limerick and ran Rathmore Stud with his wife.

== Records ==
Molony won six consecutive Irish jump racing Champion Jockeys titles between 1946 and 1951. He finished runner-up to his elder brother, Tim, in the British jump jockeys table 1949–50. Molony rode 186 winners (in Ireland, Britain and US) in 1949, including 94 jumps winners. The latter was a record that stood until broken by Charlie Swan in 1992.

== Death ==
Molony died 10 days before his 92nd birthday on 10 July 2017, aged 91.
