= Arkle =

Irish-bred Thoroughbred racehorse (1957–1970)

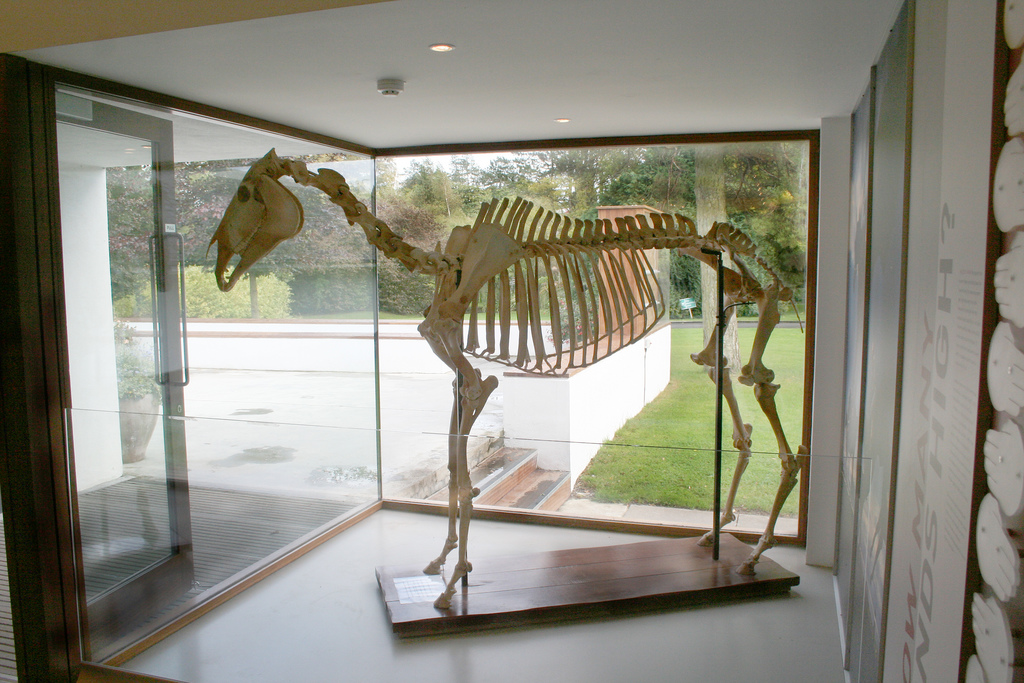
- Skeleton of Arkle the horse at the Irish National Stud
- Sire: Archive
- Grandsire: Nearco
- Dam: Bright Cherry
- Damsire: Knight of the Garter
- Sex: Gelding
- Foaled: 1957
- Country: Ireland
- Colour: Bay
- Breeder: Mary Baker
- Owner: Anne Grosvenor, Duchess of Westminster
- Trainer: Tom Dreaper
- Record: 35: 27-2-3
- Earnings: £95,198

Major wins
- Cheltenham Gold Cup (1964, 1965, 1966); King George VI Chase (1965); Irish Grand National (1964); Hennessy Gold Cup (1964, 1965); Leopardstown Chase (1964, 1965, 1966); Whitbread Gold Cup (1965); Gallaher Gold Cup (1965); Punchestown Gold Cup (1963); Powers Gold Cup (1963); SGB Handicap Chase (1966)

Awards
- Timeform: rating: 212

Honours
- British Steeplechasing Hall of Fame (1994); Arkle Challenge Trophy at Cheltenham; Arkle Novice Chase at Leopardstown; Song 'Arkle' by Dominic Behan; Irish postage stamp (1981)
- Last updated on 14 March 2025

Arkle (19 April 1957 – 31 May 1970) was an Irish-bred Thoroughbred racehorse. A bay gelding by Archive out of Bright Cherry, Arkle was the grandson of the unbeaten Flat racehorse and prepotent sire Nearco. Arkle was bred by Mary Baker of Malahow House, near Naul, County Dublin, and was born at Ballymacoll Stud, County Meath. He was owned by Anne Grosvenor, Duchess of Westminster, who named him after the mountain Arkle in Sutherland, Scotland, which bordered her Sutherland estate. Trained by Tom Dreaper at Greenogue, Kilsallaghan, in County Dublin, Arkle was ridden during his steeplechasing career by Pat Taaffe.

Arkle won three Cheltenham Gold Cups and a number of other top races before his career was cut short by injury. At 212, his Timeform rating is the highest ever awarded to a steeplechaser.

== Early life ==
Arkle, a bay colt with no white markings, was bred by Mary Baker, who kept a few mares on the family farm at Malahow, near Naul in County Dublin. His dam was Bright Cherry, who had won seven times over jumps. His sire was Archive, who, although the offspring of leading sire Nearco, had never won a race and stood at the modest fee of 48 guineas. Arkle was foaled at Ballymacoll Stud in County Meath on 19 April 1957. He was gelded as a yearling.

In August 1960, the yet unnamed gelding was sent to Goff's Bloodstock Sales in Ballsbridge, Dublin, where he was bought for 1,150 guineas by Tom Dreaper on behalf of the Duchess of Westminster. His new owner named him Arkle after a mountain overlooking her Scottish estate. After spending a year at Eaton Hall, the Westminster estate in Cheshire, Arkle returned to Ireland in August 1961 to go into training at Tom Dreaper's yard, Greenogue, at Kilsallaghan, north of Dublin.

== Racing career ==
=== 1961/1962 National Hunt season ===
Arkle's first racecourse appearance was on 9 December 1961 at Mullingar, where he came third of seventeen in the Lough Ennel Plate, a bumper. It was a race for amateur riders, and he was ridden by the Hon. Mark Hely-Hutchinson, son of Lord Donoughmore (one of Dreaper's major owners). On St Stephen's Day 1961, Arkle ran in another bumper, at Leopardstown. Again ridden by Hely-Hutchinson, he came fourth of ten.

In January 1962, Arkle had his first race over jumps in the Bective Novice Hurdle over three miles at Navan. Stable jockey Pat Taaffe had elected to ride the favourite Kerforo and the ride on Arkle was taken by stable lad Liam McLoughlin. Arkle defeated 26 runners to win by 1 1/2 lengths, prompting his trainer to say "I think we've got something there!" In his next race, the Rathconnel Handicap Hurdle over two miles at Naas, he was ridden for the first time by Taaffe. Starting at 2/1 favourite in a field of ten, he won by four lengths.

The season ended with two defeats in April 1962. Arkle, ridden by McLoughlin, finished unplaced in the two-mile Balbriggen Hurdle at Baldoyle, the only time in his career he would finish outside the first four. The pair then finished fourth in the New Handicap Hurdle at Fairyhouse, before Arkle went to spend the summer on his owner's farm at Bryanstown House, Maynooth, County Kildare.

=== 1962/1963 National Hunt season ===
The five-year-old Arkle started the 1962/1963 season with two wins over hurdles in Ireland, ridden on one occasion by Taaffe and on the other, when Taaffe was unable to make the weight, by his regular work rider, Paddy Woods. On 17 November 1962, Arkle ran for the first time over steeplechase fences in the Honeybourne Chase at Cheltenham. Ridden by Taaffe, who would go on to ride him in all his subsequent races over fences, Arkle started at 11/8 favourite and won by 20 lengths. It was his first race in England, and his victory earned him a mention in The Times, where he was described as a "promising type". As a preparation for the 1963 Cheltenham Festival, Arkle was entered in the Milltown Novice Chase at Leopardstown in February. He went off as 1/2 favourite and won by eight lengths. The race was later renamed the Arkle Novice Chase in his honour.

In March 1963, Arkle made his first appearance at the Cheltenham Festival. Having gone off as 4/9 favourite in the Broadway Novices' Chase, he put on a turn of speed from the second last, and won by twenty lengths. The season ended with two more victories in Ireland before Arkle went on his customary summer break at Bryanstown.

=== 1963/1964 National Hunt season ===
Arkle started the season with a win in the Donoughmore Plate, a flat race at Navan, in which he was ridden by former champion jockey T. P. Burns. There followed an easy victory in the Carey's Cottage Handicap Chase at Gowran Park, before he set off for England and a much-anticipated first meeting with the 1963 Gold Cup winner Mill House in the Hennessy Gold Cup at Newbury. In a field of ten, Mill House went off as 15/8 favourite and conceded 5 lbs to Arkle, who started at 5/2. Arkle was just a length behind the leader Mill House at the third last, when he slipped after landing and took a while to recover his momentum, finishing in third place.

There were three victories for Arkle in Ireland, in the Christmas Handicap Chase, the Thyestes Handicap Chase and the Leopardstown Handicap Chase, before another meeting with Mill House in the 1964 Cheltenham Gold Cup. Arkle avenged his previous defeat by beating Mill House (who had won the race the previous year) by five lengths to claim his first Gold Cup at odds of 7/4 with another previous winner and top-class chaser, Pas Seul, twenty-five lengths back in third place, and Kings Nephew, the only horse to have previously beaten Mill House, last of the four runners. It was the last time he did not start as the favourite for a race. Only two other horses entered the Gold Cup that year – and that became the norm for the next two years, for there was no point in taking on Arkle at level weights – so the remaining runners were racing for place money only.

Three weeks after his victory at Cheltenham, Arkle ran in the Irish Grand National at Fairyhouse. The racing authorities in Ireland took the unprecedented step in the Irish Grand National of devising two weight systems – one to be used when Arkle was running, and one when he was not. Arkle won the 1964 race by only one length, but he carried 30 lbs more than his rivals.

=== 1964/1965 National Hunt season ===
After a warm-up race in Ireland, Arkle returned to Newbury to avenge his defeat by Mill House in the previous year's Hennessy Gold Cup. In a field of nine, Arkle started at 5/4 favourite, with Mill House at 15/8. Taaffe let Arkle go to the front and jump alongside Mill House, who had nothing left as they entered the straight. Arkle strode away to win by ten lengths, with Mill House beaten into fourth place. Just a week later, Arkle was running in the Massey Ferguson Gold Cup at Cheltenham. He was beaten a length into third place by the grey mare Flying Wild, to whom he was conceding 32 lbs.

Arkle returned to Ireland to win the Leopardstown Handicap Chase for a second time before retaining his crown in the 1965 Cheltenham Gold Cup, this time beating Mill House by twenty lengths. His final race of the season was the Whitbread Gold Cup at Sandown Park. In spite of giving away at least 35 lbs to his six rivals, Arkle won by five lengths and netted the largest prize of his career to date, £8,230.

=== 1965/1966 National Hunt season ===
Arkle was unbeaten in his five starts in the 1965/1966 season, winning the Gallaher Gold Cup at Sandown, the Hennessy Gold Cup for a second time, the King George VI Chase by a distance at Kempton, the Leopardstown Handicap Chase for the third time (beating Height O'Fashion by a neck conceding 42lbs in Arkle's first photo finish decider), and the Cheltenham Gold Cup for the third time.

In the 1966 renewal, he was the shortest-priced favourite in history to win the Cheltenham Gold Cup, starting at odds of 1/10. He won the race by thirty lengths, hard held, from Dormant and just three other rivals, despite a mistake early in the race where he ploughed through the eleventh fence, while looking at his adoring fans in the stands. However, it did not stop his momentum, nor did he ever look like falling. Arkle had a strange quirk in that he crossed his forelegs when jumping a fence.

=== 1966/1967 National Hunt season ===
In November 1966, Arkle returned to Newbury to attempt a third consecutive victory in the Hennessy Gold Cup. Without a preparatory race, having not run for eight months and having suffered a setback in training two weeks earlier, faced five rivals all of whom carried at least 33 lbs less than him. It was outsider Stalbridge Colonist, receiving 35 lbs, who challenged Arkle on the run-in and won by half a length. The scale of the task Arkle faced is shown by the race-fit winner coming a close second and third in the two following Cheltenham Gold Cups, while in third place receiving 33 lbs was the future 1969 Gold Cup winner, What A Myth. It was Arkle's first defeat in nearly two years; racing commentator Peter O'Sullevan described it as "a magnificent, noble effort".

Arkle returned to his winning ways eighteen days later, when he landed the SGB Handicap Chase at Ascot carrying his usual top weight of 12st 7lbs. He actually conceded 35lbs to Vultrix, himself a top-class chaser who had won the race the previous year carrying top weight of 12st 1lb, and Arkle destroyed him by 15 lengths, at which his trainer, Ryan Price, remarked that "Arkle is a living phenomenon". On 27 December 1966, Arkle ran in the King George VI Chase at Kempton Park but struck the guard rail with a hoof when jumping the open ditch, which resulted in a fractured pedal bone; despite this injury, he completed the race and was only overtaken on the run-in to finish second, a half-length behind the winner, Dormant, to whom he was still conceding 21lbs. Visibly lame, Arkle was loaded into the horse-ambulance and taken back to the racecourse stables, where he remained for two months, his injured leg encased in plaster.

== Retirement ==
Arkle was in plaster for four months and, though he made a good enough recovery to go back into training, he never ran again. He was retired and ridden as a hack at Bryanstown by his owner but in 1969 his condition deteriorated and he began to show signs of stiffness in his hind legs, possibly due to arthritis. As he found it increasingly difficult to walk and appeared to be in pain, he was put down in his box at Bryanstown on 31 May 1970 at the age of thirteen. He was buried in his field at Bryanstown.

== Legacy ==
Arkle, known simply as "Himself", became a national hero and a legend during his lifetime.

Fan mail, sometimes addressed only to "Arkle, Ireland", arrived at the Greenogue yard from all over the world. When it was revealed that two pints of Guinness were added to his regular feed of oats every day, the Company undertook to supply the yard with a free supply in recognition of the "pleasant publicity".

At 212, Arkle's Timeform rating is the highest ever awarded to a steeplechaser. Only Flyingbolt, also trained by Dreaper, had a rating anywhere near his at 210. Next on their ratings are Sprinter Sacre on 192 and then Kauto Star and Mill House on 191. In 2004 he narrowly beat Desert Orchid to be named all-time favourite British or Irish racehorse in a Racing Post poll.

Arkle put in various public appearances including, after his retirement, one at the Horse of the Year Show in 1969. He has been celebrated in songs, appeared on stamps, and is commemorated with statues. In 1972 the Duchess of Westminster unveiled a statue at Cheltenham racecourse; in 2014 a 1.1 scale bronze statue was unveiled in Ashbourne, County Meath, the nearest town to the Greenogue yard.

Two races, both Grade 1, have been named in Arkle's honour: in 1969 the Arkle Challenge Trophy replaced the Cotswold Chase at Cheltenham Racecourse; and the Milltown Novice Chase at Leopardstown was renamed the Arkle Novice Chase.

In 1976, the controversial decision was made to exhume Arkle's remains and to mount his skeleton for display at the Irish National Stud. Amongst those who disapproved was Arkle's jockey Taaffe, who said: "I hated seeing his frame up there. I couldn't look at him for long".

== Race record ==
Arkle won 27 of his 35 starts, including 22 wins from 26 steeplechases, and he was placed in the other four races with mitigating circumstances for each defeat. He carried more than 12st in weight in 14 of his races, and won at distances from 1m 6f on the Flat up to 3m 5f over fences.

Besides winning three consecutive Cheltenham Gold Cups (1964, 1965, 1966) and the 1965 King George VI Chase, Arkle triumphed in a number of other important handicap chases, including the 1964 Irish Grand National (under 12–0), the 1964 and 1965 Hennessy Gold Cups (both times under 12–7), the 1965 Gallaher Gold Cup (conceding 16 lb to Mill House while breaking the course record by 17 seconds), and the 1965 Whitbread Gold Cup (under 12–7). In the 1966 Hennessy, he failed by only half a length to give Stalbridge Colonist 35 lb.

Arkle's full race record is listed below.

Date	Racecourse	Distance	Race	Jockey	Weight	Odds	Field	Result	Margin
09 Dec 61	Mullingar	2 1/4 miles	Lough Ennel Plate (NH Flat Race)	Mr M Hely-Hutchinson	11-4	5/1	17	3rd	9 lengths
26 Dec 61	Leopardstown	2 miles	Greystones Flat Race (NH Flat Race)	Mr M Hely-Hutchinson	10-11	5/1	10	4th	8 lengths
20 Jan 62	Navan	3 miles	Bective Novice Hurdle	L McLoughlin	11-5	20/1	27	1st	1 1/2 lengths
10 Mar 62	Naas	2 miles	Rathconnell Handicap Hurdle	P Taaffe	11-2	2/1f	10	1st	4 lengths
14 Apr 62	Baldoyle	2 miles	Balbriggan Handicap Hurdle	L McLoughlin	10-1	6/1	18	Unpl	15 lengths
24 Apr 62	Fairyhouse	2 miles	New Handicap Hurdle	L McLoughlin	10-5	8/1	9	4th	12 lengths
17 Oct 62	Dundalk	2 miles 1f	Wee County Handicap Hurdle	P Taaffe	11-13	6/1	10	1st	6 lengths
24 Oct 62	Gowran Park	2 miles	HE Presidents Handicap Hurdle	P Woods	10-5	9/2f	21	1st	5 lengths
17 Nov 62	Cheltenham	2 1/2 miles	Honeybourne Chase	P Taaffe	11-11	11/8f	12	1st	20 lengths
23 Feb 63	Leopardstown	2 miles	Milltown Chase	P Taaffe	12-11	1/2f	15	1st	8 lengths
12 Mar 63	Cheltenham	3 miles	Broadway Chase	P Taaffe	12-4	4/9f	15	1st	20 lengths
15 Apr 63	Fairyhouse	2 1/4 miles	Power Gold Cup Chase	P Taaffe	12-5	2/7f	5	1st	3 lengths
1 May 63	Punchestown	2 1/2 miles	John Jameson Handicap Chase	P Taaffe	12-4	4/7f	3	1st	15 lengths
09 Oct 63	Navan	1 mile 6f	Donoughmore Plate (Flat Race)	T P Burns	9-6	4/6f	13	1st	5 lengths
24 Oct 63	Gowran Park	2 1/2 miles	Carey's Cottage Handicap Chase	P Taaffe	11-13	4/7f	10	1st	10 lengths
30 Nov 63	Newbury	3 1/4 miles	Hennessy Gold Cup (Handicap Chase)	P Taaffe	11-9	5/2	10	3rd	8 3/4 lengths
26 Dec 63	Leopardstown	3 miles	Christmas Handicap Chase	P Taaffe	12-0	4/7f	6	1st	2 lengths
30 Jan 64	Gowran Park	3 miles ½f	Thyestes Handicap Chase	P Taaffe	12-0	4/6f	9	1st	10 lengths
15 Feb 64	Leopardstown	3 miles	Leopardstown Handicap Chase	P Taaffe	12-0	4/7f	6	1st	12 lengths
07 Mar 64	Cheltenham	3 1/4 miles	Cheltenham Gold Cup	P Taaffe	12-0	7/4	4	1st	5 lengths
30 Mar 64	Fairyhouse	3 1/4 miles	Irish Grand National (Handicap Chase)	P Taaffe	12-0	1/2f	7	1st	1 1/4 lengths
29 Oct 64	Gowran Park	2 1/2 miles	Carey's Cottage Handicap Chase	P Taaffe	12-0	1/5f	3	1st	5 lengths
05 Dec 64	Newbury	3 1/4 miles	Hennessy Gold Cup (Handicap Chase)	P Taaffe	12-7	5/4f	9	1st	10 lengths
12 Dec 64	Cheltenham	2 miles 5f	Massey Ferguson Gold Cup (H'cap Chase)	P Taaffe	12-10	8/11f	7	3rd	1 1/4 lengths
27 Feb 65	Leopardstown	3 miles	Leopardstown Handicap Chase	P Taaffe	12-7	8/11f	9	1st	1 length
11 Mar 65	Cheltenham	3 1/4 miles	Cheltenham Gold Cup	P Taaffe	12-0	3/10f	4	1st	20 lengths
24 Apr 65	Sandown	3 miles 5f	Whitbread Gold Cup (Handicap Chase)	P Taaffe	12-7	4/9f	7	1st	5 lengths
06 Nov 65	Sandown	3 miles ½f	Gallaher Gold Cup (Handicap Chase)	P Taaffe	12-7	4/9f	7	1st	20 lengths
27 Nov 65	Newbury	3 1/4 miles	Hennessy Gold Cup (Handicap Chase)	P Taaffe	12-7	1/6f	8	1st	15 lengths
27 Dec 65	Kempton	3 miles	King George VI Chase	P Taaffe	12-0	1/7f	4	1st	30+ lengths
01 Mar 66	Leopardstown	3 miles	Leopardstown Handicap Chase	P Taaffe	12-7	1/5f	4	1st	Neck
17 Mar 66	Cheltenham	3 1/4 miles	Cheltenham Gold Cup	P Taaffe	12-0	1/10f	5	1st	30 lengths
26 Nov 66	Newbury	3 1/4 miles	Hennessy Gold Cup (Handicap Chase)	P Taaffe	12-7	4/6f	6	2nd	½ length
14 Dec 66	Ascot	3 miles	SGB Handicap Chase	P Taaffe	12-7	1/3f	5	1st	15 lengths
27 Dec 66	Kempton	3 miles	King George VI Chase	P Taaffe	12-7	2/9f	7	2nd	1 length

== See also ==
- Repeat winners of horse races
- List of racehorses
