= Pat Taaffe =

Irish jockey (1930–1992)

Personal information
- Full name: Patrick Taaffe
- Nationality: Irish
- Born: 9 March 1930 Rathcoole, County Dublin
- Died: 7 July 1992 (aged 62) Dublin
- Occupations: Jockey, Trainer
- Children: Tom Taaffe

Horse racing career
- Sport: Horse racing

Major racing wins
- Riding Career:- Grand National (1955, 1970); Cheltenham Gold Cup (1964, 1965, 1966, 1968); Irish Grand National (1954, 1955, 1959, 1961, 1964, 1966); King George VI Chase (1965); Hennessy Gold Cup (1964, 1965); Whitbread Gold Cup (1965); Training Career:- Irish Sweeps Hurdle (1972); Scottish Champion Hurdle (1973); King George VI Chase (1974, 1975); Cheltenham Gold Cup (1974)

Significant horses
- Arkle; Captain Christy; Fortria; Fort Leney; Flyingbolt; Gay Trip; Quare Times; Royal Approach; Umm; Zonda

Patrick Taaffe (9 March 1930 – 7 July 1992) was an Irish National Hunt jockey who is often remembered as the jockey of Arkle. The pair dominated National Hunt racing in the mid-sixties, winning the Irish Grand National, the King George VI Chase, two Hennessy Gold Cups, three Cheltenham Gold Cups and the Whitbread Cup.

He was born in Dublin into a racing family. His father, Tom Taaffe, was a trainer who saddled the winner of the 1958 Grand National, Mr. What. A brother, Tos Taaffe, would become a leading jumps jockey. Taaffe started riding at an early age and won his first point-to-point in 1946 while still at school. In 1950, by this time a professional jockey, he joined the yard of trainer Tom Dreaper, where he remained as a stable jockey until his retirement in 1970.

Taaffe secured the first of two Grand National wins in 1955, riding the Vincent O'Brien-trained Quare Times. The second was in 1970, when he rode Gay Trip, trained by Fred Rimell. There were also six victories in the Irish Grand National (1954 Royal Approach, 1955 Umm, 1959 Zonda, 1961 Fortria, 1964 Arkle, 1966 Flyingbolt).

Taaffe rode Arkle, who was trained by Dreaper, for the first time in a race at Naas on 10 March 1962. Arkle started favourite in the Rathconnel Handicap Hurdle over two miles and won by four lengths. Taaffe would go on to ride Arkle in all his 27 steeplechases, with 23 wins including the Irish Grand National, the King George VI Chase, two Hennessy Gold Cup|Hennessy Gold Cups, three Cheltenham Gold Cups and the Whitbread Cup. After Arkle's injury and retirement, Taaffe partnered his stablemate Fort Leney to victory in the 1968 Cheltenham Gold Cup.

After retiring as a jockey in 1970, Taaffe went on to train Captain Christy, the 1974 Gold Cup winner. Although a good horseman, the business side of training did not come naturally to him and his training career did not flourish.

In 1955, Taaffe married Molly Lyons, sister of a veterinary surgeon. The couple had four daughters and two sons. Son Tom Taaffe became a jockey and trainer; grandson Pat Taaffe is an amateur jockey.

Taaffe died in 1992 in Dublin Hospital, aged 62, of a heart condition, having previously undergone only the third heart transplant operation in Ireland (in 1989).
