= Fred Rimell =

British champion National Hunt racing jockey and horse trainer

Personal information
- Born: 24 June 1913
- Died: 12 July 1981 (aged 68)
- Occupations: Jockey, Trainer

Horse racing career
- Sport: Horse racing

Significant horses
- ESB, Nicolaus Silver, Gay Trip, Rag Trade

Thomas Frederic Rimell (24 June 1913 – 12 July 1981), better known as Fred Rimell, was a British champion National Hunt racing jockey and horse trainer. He was champion jockey three times and leading trainer five times. Rimell was the first jumping trainer to earn £1 million in prize money for his owners.

Rimell gained the title of “Mr Grand National”, having trained four winning horses of the steeplechase. They were ESB (1956), Nicolaus Silver (1961), Gay Trip (1970) and Rag Trade, who beat Red Rum in the 1976 Grand National

Rimell was also responsible for two Cheltenham Gold Cup winners. He trained Woodland Venture to victory in 1967 ridden by Terry Biddlecombe and in 1976 Royal Frolic came home first with John Burke in the saddle.

After his death in July 1981, his widow, Mercy (née Cockburn; born 27 June 1919, Budbrooke, Warwickshire – died 6 July 2017) assumed the training licence at Kinnersley, Worcestershire and continued to train top class winners. She won the 1983 Champion Hurdle with Gaye Brief. She retired in 1989 and died in 2017, aged 98.
