= Francis Flood =

Irish horse racing trainer

Francis Flood (c.1930 – 18 October 2016) was an Irish horse racing trainer who specialized in National Hunt racing.

Flood, who trained at stables at Grangecon in County Wicklow, recorded his most notable victory as a trainer when Glencaraig Lady won the 1972 Cheltenham Gold Cup. He also won the Irish Grand National twice, with Garoupe in 1970 and Ebony Jane in 1993. He competed as an amateur jockey before becoming a trainer.
