= Tom Dreaper =

Irish steeplechase racehorse trainer

- Born: 26 September 1898; Donaghmore, Co Meath, Ireland
- Died: 28 April 1975 (aged 76)
- Occupation: Racehorse Trainer
- Children: Jim Dreaper

Thomas William Dreaper (1898-1975) was an Irish steeplechase racehorse trainer, best known for having been the trainer of Arkle and Flyingbolt.

Dreaper was born into a farming family in Donaghmore near Ashbourne on the County Meath-County Dublin border, and educated at St. Andrew's College, Dublin. In 1916, he left school to work on the family farm with his father and elder brother. In his twenties he took up riding in point-to-points, with his first win coming in 1923 on Dean Swift, a horse he owned. In 1925 he rode his first winner under Rules. In 1930, his parents bought Greenogue, a 300-acre farm a few miles from Donaghmore, which Tom farmed himself, and in 1931 he took out a licence to train. His serious amateur career came to an end with a fall at Naas 1938, which left him in hospital for eight weeks, unconscious for two of them.

Since he viewed himself primarily as a cattle-farmer, his training career was slow to take off. His first major success was with Prince Regent, who won the Irish Grand National in 1942 and the Cheltenham Gold Cup in 1946, and also came third in the Grand National in 1946 and fourth the following year. In the following years, Dreaper cemented his reputation as Ireland's leading trainer with horses such as Storm Head, Hasty Bits, Shagreen and Fortria. However, his greatest successes came with the horses owned by Anne, Duchess of Westminster, a partnership which produced 97 wins, 43 second place and 33 third-place finishes by horses such as Cashel View, Ben Stack, Sea Brief and Arkle. At one time he had in his stables both Arkle and Flyingbolt, the two highest-rated steeplechasers of all time.

In all, Dreaper trained 26 winners at the Cheltenham Festival including the Cheltenham Gold Cup and the Arkle Challenge Trophy five times each and the Champion Chase six times. He won the Irish Grand National ten times, seven times consecutively (from 1960 to 1966). The only major race that he never won was the Grand National, coming second in 1970 with Vulture and in 1971 with Black Secret, ridden by his son Jim. The Irish Grand National winners were Prince Regent (1942), Shagreen (1949), Royal Approach (1954), Olympia (1960), Fortria (1961), Kerforo (1962), Last Link (1963), Arkle (1964), Splash (1965) and Flyingbolt (1966).

Dreaper married Betty Russell in St Patrick's Cathedral, Dublin, in 1945, and had a son and two daughters. His son, Jim Dreaper, took over his stables on his retirement in 1971.
