= 2001 Grand National =

English steeplechase horse race

- Grand National
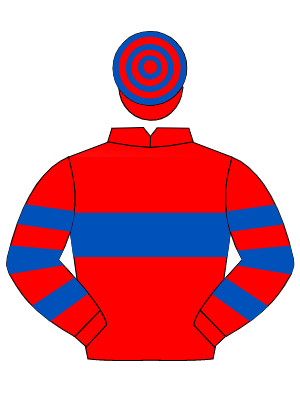
- Location: Aintree
- Date: 7 April 2001
- Winning horse: (England) Red Marauder
- Starting price: 33/1
- Jockey: (England) Richard Guest
- Trainer: (England) Norman Mason
- Owner: (England) Norman Mason
- Conditions: Heavy

External videos
- Replay of the 2001 Grand National in full Racing TV, YouTube

The 2001 Grand National (officially known as the Martell Grand National for sponsorship reasons) was the 154th official running of the Grand National horse race that took place at Aintree Racecourse near Liverpool, England, on 7 April 2001. It went ahead as planned, despite the cancellation of the 2001 Cheltenham Festival, caused by the foot-and-mouth disease crisis.

The steeplechase was won by a distance by 33/1 shot Red Marauder, ridden by jockey Richard Guest, in a time of over 11 minutes. The winner was also trained by his jockey and owned by Norman Mason, in whose name the training licence was held, with Guest as his assistant, though Guest did all the training at his base in Crook, County Durham and ran in the trainer's colours of red with a blue hoop, three blue hoops on the sleeves and a red and blue hooped cap.

The field was limited to a maximum of 40 competitors, of which only two completed the course without mishap (two others were re-mounted to complete) and the race was run in heavy going. It was notable for an unusually high number of falls, including ten at the first Canal Turn, caused by a riderless horse running across the fence, and it came in for criticism in some quarters, believing that the conditions were too wet and muddy. However, supporters of the race were quick to point out that the slow pace and bottomless ground benefitted the race as there were no injuries sustained to any horse or rider.

== Background ==
The 2001 outbreak of foot-and-mouth disease had led to the Cheltenham Festival and many other fixtures being abandoned before the Grand National meeting. However, the National got the go-ahead from racing officials. On the day, the race went ahead despite adverse weather, with high winds and an extremely heavy going.

Jockey Paul Flynn was the subject of a frantic search when Mick Fitzgerald was forced to stand down as rider of Esprit De Cotte less than two hours before the race. When Flynn did not respond to calls and texts to his mobile phone, two Tannoy announcements were sent out around the course for him to report to the weighing room. When he still did not respond an urgent message was sent out over the BBC via its live coverage of the build-up of the race. Flynn, who had never before ridden in a National, could not be located in time and the ride instead went to Tom Doyle. Flynn never got another chance to ride in the race.

== Leading contenders ==
Edmond was the winner of the 1999 Welsh National and was made 10/1 joint-favourite on the horse's preference for soft ground. He ran prominently at the head of the field for most of the first circuit and was still leading when he fell into the ditch at The Chair, catapulting rider Richard Johnson over the fence.

Moral Support was also supported to joint-favouritism on the back of a preference for soft ground and a good showing in the Welsh National four months prior. Partnered by Noel Fehily, he was towards the rear of the field when caught in a pile-up at the Canal Turn on the first circuit and brought to a standstill.

Inis Cara was the third joint-favourite but was backed purely on the basis of being a mudlark. His form lacked that of the other two joint-favourites however as he had failed to make a serious impression in any of his six previous races. His jockey Robert Widger was hoping to emulate his great-uncle who won the race over a century before, but the partnership was severed by a heavy fall at the fourth fence.

Beau was the 12/1 mount of two-time winning jockey Carl Llewellyn and had won the Whitbread Gold Cup, a respected Aintree trial, by a distance in 1999. His form in 2000 had been less impressive and his heavy weight handicap was also considered a tough ask, but the horse was coping well with it during the race and was leading the only four runners left in the race when an awkward jump at the 19th fence put his reins over his head. Jockey Llewellyn fought to try to save the situation but, without steering, was unseated at the next fence. The rider desperately chased his mount to the next fence in a bid to remount and possibly claim third place, but was unable to do so.

Mely Moss was sent off at 14/1, having finished second in the race the previous year, despite it being his only run of the season. He was again kept off the racecourse until Aintree and partnered by Norman Williamson, but they were unable to avoid the melee at the Canal Turn.

Papillon beat Mely Moss to win the previous year's National and this, coupled with his trainer risking a foot-and-mouth quarantine to bring him to Aintree, saw him well supported at 14/1. His partner in victory, Ruby Walsh again took the ride and they avoided the carnage on the first circuit to be among the only seven still continuing when a loose horse took them out at the 19th fence. Walsh remounted and hacked around the remainder of the course with the remounted Blowing Wind before being left behind at the final flight to be the last of four to complete.

The eventual winner, Red Marauder, was freely available as an each-way chance at 33/1 after disappointingly falling at Becher's Brook on the first circuit the previous year. Another fall at Haydock before the National had punters feeling that the horse was not a safe enough jumper.

== Racecard ==
No	Colours	Horse	Age	Handicap (st-lb)	SP	Jockey	Trainer
1		Beau (IRE)	8	11-10	12/1	Carl Llewelyn	Nigel Twiston-Davies
2		Papillon (IRE)	10	11-05	14/1	Ruby Walsh	Ted Walsh
3		Earthmover (IRE)	10	11-02	22/1	Joe Tizzard	Paul Nicholls
4		Merry People (IRE)	13	11-02	66/1	Garrett Cotter	John Queally
5		Tresor De Mai (FR)	7	11-02	66/1	Rodi Greene	Martin Pipe
6		General Wolfe	12	11-00	50/1	Brian Crowley	Venetia Williams
7		The Last Fling (IRE)	11	10-12	20/1	Seamus Durack	Sue Smith
8		Hanakham (IRE)	12	10-11	100/1	Barry Geraghty	Donald McCain
9		Addington Boy (IRE)	13	10-11	33/1	John McNamara	Ferdy Murphy
10		Red Marauder	11	10-11	33/1	Richard Guest	Norman Mason
11		Djeddah (FR)	10	10-11	33/1	Thierry Doumen	Francois Doumen
12		Strong Tel (IRE)	11	10-11	33/1	David Casey	Martin Pipe
13		Unsinkable Boxer (IRE)	12	10-10	66/1	Dean Gallagher	Robert Alner
14		Blowing Wind (FR)	8	10-09	16/1	Tony McCoy	Martin Pipe
15		Moral Support (IRE)	9	10-09	10/1 JF	Noel Fehily	Charlie Mann
16		Northern Starlight	10	10-07	50/1	Tom Scudamore	Martin Pipe
17		Noble Lord	8	10-05	25/1	Jimmy McCarthy	Richard Phillips
18		Amberleigh House (IRE)	9	10-05	150/1	Warren Marston	Ginger McCain
19		Exit Swinger (FR)	6	10-05	50/1	Chris Maude	Martin Pipe
20		Mely Moss (FR)	10	10-05	14/1	Norman Williamson	Charles Egerton
21		Dark Stranger (IRE)	10	10-03	25/1	Kieron Kelly	Martin Pipe
22		Listen Timmy (NZ)	11	10-03	100/1	Tony Dobbin	Alan King
23		Inis Cara (IRE)	9	10-03	10/1 JF	Robert Widger	Venetia Williams
24		Edmond (FR)	9	10-01	10/1 JF	Richard Johnson	Henry Daly
25		You're Agoodun	9	10-01	28/1	Robert Wakley	Martin Pipe
26		No Retreat (NZ)	7	10-02	100/1	Jason Maguire	Steve Brookshaw
27		Smarty (IRE)	8	10-00	16/1	Timmy Murphy	Mark Pitman
28		Hollybank Buck (IRE)	11	10-00	20/1	Francis Flood	Tony Martin
29		Moondigua (IRE)	9	10-00	100/1	Shay Barry	Martin Pipe
30		Village King (IRE)	8	10-00	25/1	Jim Culloty	Philip Hobbs
31		Spanish Main (IRE)	7	10-00	25/1	Jamie Goldstein	Nigel Twiston-Davies
32		Esprit De Cotte (FR)	9	10-00	33/1	Tom Doyle	Nicky Henderson
33		Lance Armstrong (IRE)	11	10-02	50/1	Andrew Thornton	Robert Alner
34		Kaki Crazy (FR)	6	10-00	66/1	Rodney Farrant	Martin Pipe
35		Feels Like Gold (IRE)	13	10-00	50/1	Brian Harding	Nicky Richards
36		Paddy's Return (IRE)	9	10-00	16/1	Adrian Maguire	Ferdy Murphy
37		Brave Highlander (IRE)	13	10-00	33/1	Philip Hide	Josh Gifford
38		Art Prince (IRE)	11	10-00	150/1	Jim Crowley	Martin Pipe
39		Mister One	10	10-00	50/1	Mark Bradburne	Colin Tizzard
40		Supreme Charm (IRE)	9	10-00	33/1	Robert Thornton	Kim Bailey

- Great Britain unless stated.

== The race ==
Placed horses

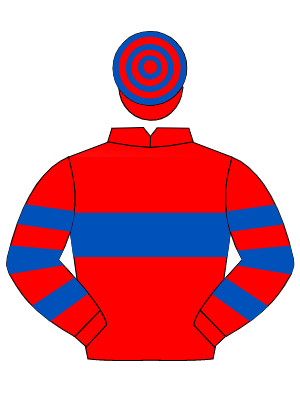
1: Red Marauder

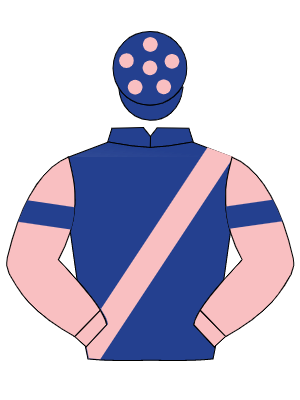
2: Smarty

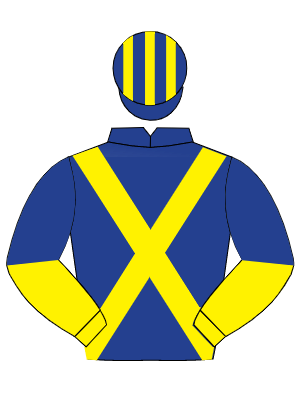
3: Blowing Wind

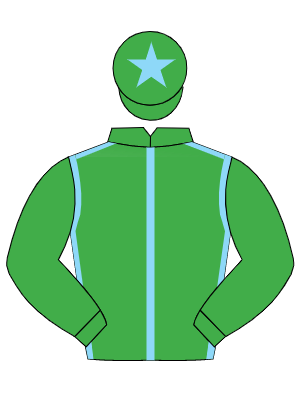
4: Papillon

The heavy conditions contributed greatly to the horses that fell during the race; eight had already fallen by the third fence. One of the horses that fell in the opening stages, Paddy's Return, carried on as a loose horse and caused pandemonium at the Canal Turn, where he brought down several nearby runners. Ten horses were lost at the Turn overall, including Moral Support, one of the favourites, and future winner Amberleigh House. No Retreat, who was one of the rank outsiders, was also carried out at the Turn but managed to retake the fence and continued over a fence behind the rest of the remaining runners.

Only 15 horses remained after the Turn, and then 13 going onto the racecourse proper for the first time. At the 13th, Noble Lord fell, leaving only 12 to tackle The chair, the large standside jump. This year it claimed three horses including joint-favourite Edmond, each-way shot Supreme Charm and largely unfancied Moondigua. Listen Timmy made a major mistake, recovered, but was pulled up immediately after the fence. No Retreat, who was completely tailed off at the time was eventually pulled up by jockey Jason Maguire before the start of the second circuit. As the field left for the second circuit, only seven horses remained: Red Marauder, Papillon, Beau, Blowing Wind, Brave Highlander, Unsinkable Boxer, and Smarty, with Lance Armstrong, who remounted, around half a mile behind.

Approaching the 19th, a couple of loose horses veered across the ditch, similar to what had happened earlier at the Canal Turn, and hampered Papillon, Blowing Wind and Brave Highlander, resulting in their refusals. Unsinkable Boxer also refused at the big ditch independently. This left three. The leader of the trio and top weight, Beau, unseated jockey Llewellyn at the 20th fence after his reins broke. Two fences back, Tony McCoy remounted Blowing Wind and Ruby Walsh remounted Papillon. McCoy later said, "I looked up at the big screen and saw there were only two horses still racing. I shouted to Ruby [Walsh], 'Come on, let's get back up'". Blowing Wind and Papillon both continued the course to take third and fourth place respectively.

Going into the last few fences Smarty had a lead over Red Marauder. However, by the second-last, Guest on Red Marauder had drawn level with Smarty, and ultimately won by a distance. A mud-covered Guest celebrated crossing the finish line in the slowest Grand National winning time for over 100 years. It was the first time since Ben Nevis won in 1980 that just four horses finished the race, and the first time since 1967 that there were only two unhampered finishers when the largely unnoticed Packed Home successfully negotiated the infamous 23rd fence pile up behind Foinavon to complete unhindered.

== Finishing order ==
Position	Number	Name	Jockey	Age	Weight (st, lb)	Starting price	Distance
1st	10	Red Marauder	Richard Guest	11	10-11	33/1	A distance
2nd	27	Smarty	Timmy Murphy	8	10-0	16/1	A distance
3rd	14	Blowing Wind	Tony McCoy	8	10-9	16/1	A distance
4th	2	Papillon	Ruby Walsh	10	11-4	14/1	Last to complete

== Non-finishers ==
Fence	Number	Name	Jockey	Age	Weight (st-lb.)	Starting price	Fate
20th	1	Beau	Carl Llewellyn	8	11-10	12/1	Unseated rider
19th (open ditch)	13	Unsinkable Boxer	Dean Gallagher	12	10-10	66/1	Refused
19th (open ditch)	37	Brave Highlander	Philip Hide	13	10-0	33/1	Refused
16th (water jump)	26	No Retreat	Jason Maguire	8	10-1	100/1	Pulled up
16th (water jump)	22	Listen Timmy	Tony Dobbin	12	10-3	100/1	Pulled up
15th (The chair)	24	Edmond	Richard Johnson	9	10-1	10/1 JF	Fell
15th (The chair)	40	Supreme Charm	Robert Thornton	9	9-8	33/1	Unseated Rider
15th (The chair)	29	Moondigua	Shay Barry	9	9-12	100/1	Refused and Unseated Rider
13th	17	Noble Lord	Jimmy McCarthy	8	10-5	25/1	Fell
11th	32	Esprit De Cotte	Tom Doyle	9	9-11	33/1	Refused and Unseated rider
9th (Valentine's)	39	Mister One	Leslie Jefford	10	9-8	50/1	Unseated rider
8th (Canal Turn)	18	Amberleigh House	Warren Marston	9	10-5	150/1	Brought down
8th (Canal Turn)	21	Dark Stranger	Kieran Kelly	10	10-3	25/1	Refused
8th (Canal Turn)	6	General Wolfe	Brian Crowley	12	11-0	50/1	Unseated Rider
8th (Canal Turn)	30	Village King	Jim Culloty	8	9-12	25/1	Brought down
8th (Canal Turn)	20	Mely Moss	Norman Williamson	10	10-5	14/1	Brought down
8th (Canal Turn)	25	You're Agoodun	Rupert Wakeley	9	10-1	28/1	Brought down
8th (Canal Turn)	35	Feels Like Gold	Brian Harding	13	9-10	50/1	Refused
8th (Canal Turn)	15	Moral Support	Noel Fehily	9	10-9	10/1 JF	Refused
8th (Canal Turn)	11	Djeddah	Thierry Doumen	13	10-11	33/1	Unseated Rider
8th (Canal Turn)	33	Lance Armstrong	Andrew Thornton	11	9-11	50/1	Refused
7th (Foinavon)	4	Merry People	Gareth Cotter	13	9-8	66/1	Unseated Rider
6th (Becher's Brook)	19	Exit Swinger	Chris Maude	6	10-5	50/1	Fell
6th (Becher's Brook)	16	Northern Starlight	Tom Scudamore	10	10-7	50/1	Unseated rider
6th (Becher's Brook)	12	Strong Tel	David Casey	11	10-11	33/1	Fell
5th	7	The Last Fling	Seamus Durack	11	10-12	20/1	Unseated rider
4th	3	Earthmover	Joe Tizzard	10	11-2	22/1	Unseated rider
4th	23	Inis Cara	Robert Widger	9	10-3	10/1 JF	Fell
3rd	28	Hollybank Buck	Fran Flood	11	9-13	20/1	Fell
3rd	34	Kaki Crazy	Rodney Farrant	6	9-11	66/1	Fell
3rd	36	Paddy's Return	Adrian Maguire	9	9-9	16/1	Unseated rider
2nd	9	Addington Boy	John P. McNamara	13	10-11	33/1	Unseated Rider
2nd	5	Tresor De Mai	Rodi Greene	7	11-2	66/1	Fell
2nd	8	Hanakham	Barry Geraghty	12	10-11	100/1	Fell
1st	38	Art Prince	Jim Crowley	11	9-8	150/1	Fell
1st	31	Spanish Main	Jamie Goldstein	7	9-11	25/1	Unseated Rider

== Jockeys ==
Twice former winner Carl Llewellyn was the most experienced rider in the weighing room, weighing out for a Grand National for the 11th time, including the void race of 1993, and unusually was the only rider in the field with ten rides under his belt. In addition there was also a higher-than-average number of rookies in the weighing room, though the ability of all 12 riders making their debut could not be questioned or offered as having any effect on the carnage that followed in the race. Noel Fehily carried the best chance of a winning debut but was among those knocked out of the race at the Canal Turn pile-up. Indeed, none of the 12 debutants completed the first circuit, Jason Maguire going the farthest when pulling his mount up at the water jump. The remainder of the group included Tom Doyle, drafted in when Mick Fitzgerald was injured, John McNamara, Brian Crowley, Shay Barry, Fran Flood and Leslie Jefford. The remainder of the group was made up of Tom Scudamore, whose father and grandfather had both previously taken part in the race, the latter winning in 1959, and a trio of riders whose only ride in the race this proved to be for different circumstances; Jim Crowley, who went on to become Champion Jockey on the flat in 2016, Jamie Goldstein who missed the ride on the eventual winner the following year when suffering a broken leg weeks before the race, and Kieran Kelly who was killed racing in Ireland in 2003.

== Controversy ==
There were numerous suggestions in the press that the race should not have been run due to the conditions. Racing Post journalist and lead presenter of Channel 4 Racing, Alastair Down, wrote: "You can wash the mud off the jockeys' silks, but not the stain off the race", under a front-page headline: Gutless, Witless and Utterly Reckless. John Maxse, spokesman of the Jockey Club, said: "It was fairly shocking, uncomfortable viewing".

However, many in racing leapt to Aintree's defence, as it was loose horses that had caused most problems. Despite more than 30 of the 40 horses either falling or being brought down, all of the horses and jockeys were fine afterwards and no major injuries were sustained.

== Media coverage ==
The BBC retained the rights to broadcast the race live on terrestrial television in the United Kingdom as they had done every year since 1960. BBC One's Saturday afternoon sports show Grandstand covered the race as a Grand National special, which began at 12:45pm BST and was presented by Sue Barker and Clare Balding. This consisted of race build-up, with previews of the main contenders, interviews with connections of the runners, and celebrity spectators, as well as nostalgic segments from the history of the race, while Angus Loughran provided regular updates on the betting market.

As they race up now towards the elbow now it's Red Marauder who's out in front. Battling on in second is Smarty. Looking well back down the track to try and find Papillon who's been remounted, but as they race towards the elbow, this is a famous victory for Red Marauder and Richard Guest, as he races now past the elbow. Up on the run-in now. The cheers of the crowd, they are applauding a very brave horse and a great rider. It's a great ride by Richard Guest to go on and win the 2001 Martell Grand National on Red Marauder. Red Marauder comes home, alone. Red Marauder the winner of the Grand National, has won it by a distance!

— Commentator Jim McGrath describes the climax of the race

In addition to the race itself the programme also broadcast live coverage of three other races on the Aintree card — the Cordon Bleu Handicap Hurdle, the Martell Maghull Novices Steeplechase and the Martell Aintree Hurdle, none of which were run over the Grand National course. The commentator for these races was Jim McGrath, who also called home the winner of the National where he was joined by a commentary team of John Hanmer and Tony O'Hehir (however O'Hehir played no part in the commentary of the race as rain caused a power failure at his commentary position at Becher's Brook). Hanmer, whose role was to commentate on the runners over the first four fences and the last three along the Canal side of the course took over and continued commentary of both circuits from fences one to 12 and 17 to 28. McGrath continued his normal commentary of the race as on the racecourse proper.

48 cameras were used to film the action, including inside two jockeys' caps and some inside fences. The majority of these shots were used in a detailed post-race re-run with Richard Pitman, Peter Scudamore and Mick Fitzgerald. The BBC's coverage was also syndicated across the world for live coverage in China, the United States, Canada and large parts of Europe and Asia for an estimated global viewing audience of 650 million people during the eleven minutes of the race itself.

BBC Radio covered the race for the 59th time since its first broadcast in 1927 and was part of its Five Live Sports broadcast hosted by Mark Pougatch. The radio commentary team was headed by Peter Bromley who had announced that this would be his last commentary of the National, his first having been in 1960. He was joined by Lee McKenzie, Cornelius Lysaght and Dave Smith.

The race was also streamed live on the Internet using BBC pictures to an undisclosed audience.
