= 1967 Grand National =

Horse race held in 1967

- Grand National
- Location: Aintree Racecourse
- Date: 8 April 1967
- Winning horse: (Republic of Ireland) Foinavon
- Starting price: 100/1
- Jockey: (England) John Buckingham
- Trainer: John Kempton
- Owner: Cyril Watkins

External videos
- BBC
- British Pathe

The 1967 Grand National was the 121st running of the world-famous Grand National steeplechase that took place at Aintree Racecourse near Liverpool, England, on 8 April 1967. The race is best remembered for being won by outsider Foinavon at odds of 100/1, after avoiding a mêlée at the 23rd fence and jumping it at the first attempt.

Rutherfords has been hampered, and so has Castle Falls; Rondetto has fallen, Princeful has fallen, Norther has fallen, Kirtle Lad has fallen, The Fossa has fallen, there's a right pile-up... And now, with all this mayhem, Foinavon has gone off on his own! He's about 50, 100 yards in front of everything else!

— Commentator Michael O'Hehir describes the chaotic scene at the 23rd fence in 1967

By Becher's Brook on the second circuit 28 horses were left in the race and all jumped it successfully. One horse, Vulcano, had been injured in a fall at the third fence and was euthanised.

The most dramatic moment of the race, and perhaps of Grand National history, came when a loose horse – Popham Down, who had been hampered and unseated his rider at the first fence – veered dramatically to his right at the 23rd fence, slamming into Rutherfords, unseating its jockey Johnny Leech. A pile-up ensued. Rondetto, Norther, Princeful, Leedsy and other horses hit the ground, then began running up and down the fence preventing others from jumping and bringing the whole race effectively to a halt. Some even began running in the wrong direction, back the way they had come.

Foinavon, whose owner had travelled to Worcester on race day to ride another of his horses, had been in 22nd position at Becher's, about three lengths behind the favourite Honey End, and his jockey, John Buckingham, had sufficient time to steer his mount wide of the mêlée and find a small gap in the fence to jump cleanly on the outside. Kirtle Lad also survived and raced clear of the field but refused at the next fence. This was not picked up on the TV coverage but shown on cinema newsreels.

With the demise of Kirtle Lad, Buckingham found himself with a surprise lead of 30 lengths. Although 17 jockeys remounted to give chase and some did make up considerable ground, especially Josh Gifford on 15/2 favourite Honey End, none had time to catch Foinavon before he passed the finishing post 15 lengths clear. His success paid out a record 444/1 on the Tote.

After the race, commentator Michael O'Hehir suggested that with obstacles like Becher's Brook and Valentine's, the 23rd might one day be named after Foinavon. In 1984, the Aintree executive officially named the fence (the smallest on the course at 4 ft 6 in (1.37 m)) the Foinavon fence.

Three jockeys had turned him down. They asked me and I mean I'd have ridden Dick's donkey to be in the Grand National.

— Jockey John Buckingham reflects on choosing to ride Foinavon in 1967

As part of the BBC's coverage of the 2010 Grand National, jockey John Buckingham described some of the extraordinary circumstances of his win in an interview. Three jockeys had turned down Foinavon prior to the race (his price the day before the National was 500/1), but Buckingham took up the opportunity to ride in the famous steeplechase. With a clear view of the mêlée at the 23rd, Foinavon was almost hampered by Honey End, whose jockey had remounted, turned around and was ready to attempt to jump the fence. At the next obstacle, the Canal Turn, Buckingham looked back in disbelief at the clear lead he held with just six fences remaining. After passing the elbow on the run-in, he got a final burst of energy from Foinavon, and later reflected: "Then there was no doubt, I knew I won it. I was absolutely over the moon."

1967 was also the year when Red Rum made his first appearance at Aintree, as a two-year-old in a five-furlong sprint, finishing in a dead-heat for first the day before the National. Ten years later, he would return to the same racecourse to secure his unprecedented third Grand National title.

A similar incident to the mêlée at the 23rd fence occurred in the 2001 when Red Marauder won the race from Smarty after they were left clear following a pile-up at the Canal Turn on the first circuit, and after the other remaining horses fell or were brought down by the 20th fence.

It was also reminiscent of the 1928 Grand National, when Tipperary Tim was the only horse to finish the race without being remounted, also at odds of 100-1.

== Finishing order ==
Position	Name	Jockey	Age	Handicap (st-lb)	SP	Distance
01	Foinavon	John Buckingham	9	10-0	100/1	
02	Honey End	Josh Gifford	10	10-4	15/2	
03	Red Alligator	Brian Fletcher	8	10-0	30/1	
04	Greek Scholar	Terry Biddlecombe	8	10-9	20/1	
05	Packed Home	Tommy Carberry	12	10-0	100/1	
06	Solbina	Eddie Harty	10	11-2	25/1	
07	Aussie	Frank Shortt	10	10-0	50/1	
08	Scottish Final	Nobby Howard	10	10-0	100/1	
09	What A Myth	Paul Kelleway	10	12-0	20/1	
10	Kapeno	Nick Gasalee	10	11-1	25/1	
11	Quintin Bay	Jackie Cullen	11	10-0	50/1	
12	Bob-A-Job	Chris Young	13	10-0	100/1	
13	Steel Bridge	Eamon Prendergast	9	10-0	100/1	
14	Castle Falls	Stan Hayhurst	10	10-3	50/1	
15	Ross Sea	John Cook	11	10-3	66/1	
16	Rutherfords	Johnny Leech	7	10-11	28/1	
17	Freddie	Pat McCarron	10	11-13	100/9	
18	Game Purston	Ken White	9	10-0	66/1	

== Non-finishers ==
Fence	Name	Jockey	Age	Handicap (st-lb)	Starting price	Fate
19	Kilburn	Tim Norman	9	11-0	100/8	Fell
01	Bassnet	David Nicholson	8	10-11	10/1	Fell
01	Meon Valley	Andy Turnell	12	10-7	66/1	Fell
19	Lucky Domino	John Kenneally	10	10-5	66/1	Refused
03	Dorimont	Richard Pitman	13	10-0	100/1	Fell
03	April Rose	Piers Bengough	12	10-8	66/1	Fell
03	Vulcano	Jeremy Speid-Soote	9	10-0	40/1	Fell
12	Ronald's Boy	Paul Irby	10	10-13	100/1	Fell
06	Border Fury	David Crossley-Cooke	8	10-2	100/2	Fell
19	Aerial III	Tim Durant	11	10-9	100/1	Fell
19	Tower Road	Ray Williams	9	10-0	40/1	Fell
15	Anglo	Bobby Beasley	9	11-1	100/8	Pulled Up
16	Forecastle	Nimrod Wilkinson	9	10-10	50/1	Pulled Up
23	The Fossa	Stan Mellor	10	10-2	100/8	Pulled Up
23	Norther	Mr John Lawrence	10	10-0	50/1	Pulled Up
23	Dun Widdy	John Edwards	11	10-10	100/1	Pulled Up
19	Penvuglo	Johnny Lehane	8	10-0	50/1	Pulled Up
23	Harry Black	Roddy Reid	10	10-0	100/1	Refused
23	Different Class	David Mould	7	11-2	100/8	Brought Down
23	Limeking	Pat Buckley	10	10-3	33/1	Brought Down
01	Popham Down	Macer Gifford	10	10-0	66/1	Brought Down
23	Leedsy	Stan Murphy	9	10-5	50/1	Brought Down
23	Princeful	Roy Edwards	9	10-2	100/1	Brought Down
23	Rondetto	Johnny Haine	11	11-7	33/1	Refused
24	Kirtle-Lad	Paddy Broderick	8	10-3	28/1	Refused
27	Barberyn	Nick Mullins	12	10-1	100/1	Refused

== Media coverage ==
Once again the BBC provided the television coverage with David Coleman fronting a special edition of Grandstand. Four commentators were used for the first time, Peter O'Sullevan, Bob Haynes, Michael O'Hehir and Michael Seth-Smith.
