= Royal Gait =

British-bred Thoroughbred racehorse

- Sire: Gunner B
- Grandsire: Royal Gunner
- Dam: High Gait
- Damsire: High Top
- Foaled: 12 April 1983
- Country: United Kingdom
- Colour: Bay
- Breeder: Ian H Wills
- Owner: Manuel Pereira-Arias; Sheikh Mohammed
- Trainer: Gerardo Villarta; Miguel Alonso; John Fellows; Henry Cecil; James Fanshawe
- Record: 22:15-5-0

Major wins
- Gran Premio de San Sebastian (1986); Prix du Cadran (1987); Prix Royal Oak (1987); Prix de Barbeville (1988); Prix Vicomtesse Vigier (1988); Ascot Gold Cup (1988 disqualified); Champion Hurdle (1992)

Royal Gait (12 April 1983 – 30 December 1992) was a British-bred Thoroughbred racehorse who won at the highest level in both Flat and National Hunt racing. Originally trained in Spain, where he won seven races, he was later moved to France where he became an outstanding performer over staying distances, winning the Prix du Cadran and Prix Royal Oak as a four-year-old in 1987. In the following year he won the Prix de Barbeville and the Prix Vicomtesse Vigier before being controversially disqualified after winning the Ascot Gold Cup. After a break of more than three years he was sent to the United Kingdom to compete in Hurdle races and won the 1992 Champion Hurdle. He collapsed and died after finishing fourth at Leopardstown Racecourse on 30 December 1992.

== Background ==
Royal Gait was a bay gelding with a small white star and a white sock on his left hind leg bred by Ian H Wills. He was sired by Gunner B, who won the 1978 Eclipse Stakes before becoming a successful National Hunt stallion. His other major winners included the Grand National winner Red Marauder and the World Hurdle winner Iris's Gift. Royal Gait's dam, High Gait, was a granddaughter of the Irish Oaks winner Merry Mate, who was, in turn, a daughter of the Ascot Gold Cup winner Gladness.

As an unraced two-year-old in March 1985, Royal Gait was sold at Doncaster for 5,500 guineas. He was sent to race in Spain where he was owned by Manuel Pereira-Arias and trained by Gerardo Villarta.

== Racing career ==
=== 1986: three-year-old season ===
As a three-year-old, Royal Gait won four races in Spain, including the Gran Premio de San Sebastian and one minor race in the French provinces.

=== 1987: four-year-old season ===
In the early part of 1987, Royal Gait won three races in Spain, including two Group Three races in Madrid before being sent to France to contest the Group One Prix du Cadran over 4000 metres at Longchamp Racecourse on 24 May. He was given little chance and started the 36/1 outsider in a field of nine runners. Ridden by Olindo Mongelluzzo he was restrained in the early stages before taking the lead in the straight and won by a length from the 6/4 favourite Satco. The gelding then finished second to the mare Tailga in the Gran Premio de San Sebastian and second to Yaka (conceding 11 pounds) in the Prix Gladiateur. In October, by which time he was being trained in France by John Fellows, Royal Gait returned to Longchamp for the Group One Prix Royal-Oak over 3100 metres and started the 19/10 favourite in a field which included runners from France, Ireland, the United Kingdom, Germany, Sweden and Norway. Ridden by Alfred Gibert, he took the lead 400 metres from the finish and drew away in the closing stages to win by eight lengths from Spruce Baby.

=== 1988: five-year-old season ===
Royal Gait began his 1988 campaign by beating a field which included Satco and Yaka in the Group Three Prix de Barbeville at Longchamp on 4 April. He won by two lengths despite conceding weight to his ten opponents. Three weeks later, over the same course, he conceded seven pounds to Satco and won the Group Two Prix Vicomtesse Vigier by a short head. On 22 May he attempted to win his second Prix du Cadran, but after appearing to have a good chance of repeating his success of the previous year, he swerved to the left in the closing stages and was beaten half a length by Yaka.

On 16 June, Royal Gait was sent to contest Britain's most prestigious stayers race, the Gold Cup over two and a half miles at Royal Ascot. Cash Asmussen took over the ride from Gibert, and the gelding started the 15/2 fourth choice in the betting behind Sadeem, Primitive Rising and Sergeyevich. He was not among the early leaders but moved up to fourth place on the turn into the straight. At this point, El Conquistador, who had been acting as a pacemaker for Sadeem, dropped back sharply and collided with Royal Gait who was moving up on the rail. El Conquistador stumbled badly and unseated his jockey Tony Clark. Royal Gait continued his run on the inside, took the lead approaching the final furlong, and drew away to win by five lengths from Sadeem with a gap of fifteen length back to Sergeyevich in third. Royal Gait's winning time of 4:15.67 broke the existing course record by more than three seconds. The racecourse stewards held an inquiry into the race, concluded that Asmussen had been responsible for bumping El Conquistador and disqualified Royal Gait. The result of the inquiry has been described as "among racing's greatest bungles". Fellows described the result as "difficult to believe".

On his final appearance of the season, Royal Gait was dropped back in distance for the Group Three Prix Maurice de Nieuil over 2500 metres at Saint-Cloud Racecourse in July. He finished second of the ten runners, beaten half a length by the British-trained four-year-old Merce Cunningham, to whom he was conceding seven pounds.

=== 1991/1992 National Hunt season ===
Before the start of the 1990 Flat season, Royal Gait was bought by Sheikh Mohammed and was sent to be trained by Henry Cecil at Newmarket. Because of training problems, the gelding missed the whole of the 1990 and 1991 flat seasons with a leg injury. As a seven-year-old, he was transferred to the stable of James Fanshawe to be prepared for National Hunt racing.

After almost three and a half years off the course, Royal Gait returned in a novice hurdle race at Kempton Park on 26 December 1991. He was three years older than any of his opponents and started at odds of 12/1 in a field of thirteen. Ridden by Graham McCourt, he hung badly to the left in the closing stages but finished second to the favourite, Travado, who went on to win several major races including the Arkle Challenge Trophy in 1993. The unplaced horses included the subsequent Fighting Fifth Hurdle winner Halkopous. Four weeks later, Royal Gait started the 2/9 favourite for a novice hurdle at Nottingham Racecourse and recorded his first win over obstacles, taking the lead approaching the last hurdle and accelerating clear to win by fifteen lengths from K-Brigade. At the same course on 15 February, Royal Gait was matched against more experienced hurdlers in a handicap race over two miles. Carrying a relatively light weight of 149 pounds, he started the 10/11 favourite and won "comfortably" by three and a half lengths from Cheerful Times.

On 10 March 1992, Royal Gait was moved up sharply in class to contest the Grade I Champion Hurdle at Cheltenham. As a nine-year-old with only three previous runs under National Hunt rules, he was both the oldest and the least experienced horse in the sixteen runner field. Ridden by McCourt, he started the 6/1 third favourite behind the 1991 winner Morley Street and Granville Again, who went on to win the race in 1993. He was restrained in the early stages before moving up to take the lead approaching the final hurdle where he was challenged and headed by the David Elsworth-trained five-year-old Oh So Risky. In the closing stages, Royal Gait failed to keep a straight course, hanging to the left and then to the right, but he regained the lead and prevailed by half a length and a short head from Oh So Risky and Ruling. He was the first novice to win the race since Doorknocker in 1956.

After a break of more than nine months, Royal Gait returned in a handicap hurdle at Leopardstown Racecourse on 30 December in which he was assigned top weight of 168 pounds. He started the 11/10 favourite but finished fourth of the seven runner behind the Noel Meade-trained Novello Allegro. Shortly after crossing the finishing line, Royal Gait collapsed and died after having a heart attack. McCourt said, "He began to lose his action three strides before the last. At first I thought he had blown up or even broken down, but as soon as we got to the line I realised he was going to keel over with me".

== Pedigree ==
Pedigree of Royal Gait (GB), bay gelding, 1983
| Sire Gunner B (GB) 1973 | Royal Gunner (USA); 1962 | Royal Charger | Nearco |
| Sire Gunner B (GB) 1973 | Royal Gunner (USA); 1962 | Royal Charger | Sun Princess |
| Sire Gunner B (GB) 1973 | Royal Gunner (USA); 1962 | Levee | Hill Prince |
| Sire Gunner B (GB) 1973 | Royal Gunner (USA); 1962 | Levee | Bourtai |
| Sire Gunner B (GB) 1973 | Sweet Councillor (GB); 1968 | Privy Councillor | Counsel |
| Sire Gunner B (GB) 1973 | Sweet Councillor (GB); 1968 | Privy Councillor | High Number |
| Sire Gunner B (GB) 1973 | Sweet Councillor (GB); 1968 | Sugarstick | Zucchero |
| Sire Gunner B (GB) 1973 | Sweet Councillor (GB); 1968 | Sugarstick | York Gala |
| Dam High Gait (GB) 1977 | High Top (IRE); 1969 | Derring-Do | Darius |
| Dam High Gait (GB) 1977 | High Top (IRE); 1969 | Derring-Do | Sipsey Bridge |
| Dam High Gait (GB) 1977 | High Top (IRE); 1969 | Camenae | Vimy |
| Dam High Gait (GB) 1977 | High Top (IRE); 1969 | Camenae | Madrilene |
| Dam High Gait (GB) 1977 | Gay Charlotte (GB); 1971 | Charlottown | Charlottesville |
| Dam High Gait (GB) 1977 | Gay Charlotte (GB); 1971 | Charlottown | Meld |
| Dam High Gait (GB) 1977 | Gay Charlotte (GB); 1971 | Merry Mate | Ballymoss |
| Dam High Gait (GB) 1977 | Gay Charlotte (GB); 1971 | Merry Mate | Gladness (Family:7-a) |
