= Gunner B =

British-bred Thoroughbred racehorse

- Sire: Royal Gunner
- Grandsire: Royal Charger
- Dam: Sweet Councillor
- Damsire: Privy Councillor
- Sex: Stallion
- Foaled: 8 March 1973
- Country: United Kingdom
- Colour: Chestnut
- Breeder: Tom Barratt
- Owner: Pauline Barratt
- Trainer: Geoff Toft; Henry Cecil
- Record: 33:14-5-7

Major wins
- Cecil Frail Handicap (1976); Andy Capp Handicap (1976); Doonside Cup (1976); Diomed Stakes (1977); Earl of Sefton Stakes (1978); Brigadier Gerard Stakes (1978); Prince of Wales's Stakes (1978); Eclipse Stakes (1978); Valdoe Stakes (1978)

Awards
- Timeform rating 106 (1975), 121 (1976), 116 (1977), 126 (1978)

Gunner B (8 March 1973 – 18 January 2003) was a British Thoroughbred racehorse and sire. In a racing career which lasted from May 1975 until October 1978 he contested thirty-three races, winning fourteen times, finishing second five times and third seven times. Originally trained in Yorkshire, he won twice as a two-year-old in 1975 before becoming a highly successful handicapper in the following season, when he won the Cecil Frail Handicap, Andy Capp Handicap and the Doonside Cup. He won three races in 1977 including the Group Three Diomed Stakes but appeared to have been well-exposed as a tough, consistent horse who was some way below the best. After joining the stable of Henry Cecil in 1978, however, he emerged as a genuinely top-class horse winning the Earl of Sefton Stakes, Brigadier Gerard Stakes, Prince of Wales's Stakes, Eclipse Stakes and Valdoe Stakes as well as finishing second in the Benson and Hedges Gold Cup and third in the Champion Stakes. After his retirement from racing, he became a very successful sire of National Hunt horses. He died in 2003 at the age of thirty.

== Background ==
Gunner B was a "strong, deep-bodied" chestnut horse with a narrow white blaze bred by Tom Barratt at his Harness Grove Stud in Worksop, Nottinghamshire. He was the best horse sired by the American stallion Royal Gunner, who won the Cornhusker Handicap in 1966 and finished second to Roman Brother and Buckpasser in successive runnings of the Woodward Stakes. Gunner B's dam, Sweet Councillor, was an unraced daughter of Sugarstick, a half sister of the Cambridgeshire Handicap winner Sterope.

During his racing career Gunner B raced in the colours of Tom Barratt's wife Pauline. The colt was originally sent into training with Geoff Toft at his stable at Beverley in the East Riding of Yorkshire.

== Racing career ==
=== 1975: two-year-old season ===
After running third on his debut, Gunner B finished first in a race over five furlongs at Pontefract Racecourse in May but was "unluckily" disqualified. He finished placed in his next three races before winning a six furlong maiden race at Newcastle in August. In the following month he won a Nursery (a handicap race for two-year-olds) at Doncaster Racecourse, winning by two lengths from Gemina.

=== 1976: three-year-old season ===
On his first appearance as a three-year-old, Gunner B won a minor race over ten furlongs at Doncaster on the opening day of the flat season in March. After finishing fourth on his next appearance he was moved up in class and finished second in both the Dee Stakes at Chester and the Dante Stakes at York in May. He was dropped back to a mile for the Cecil Frail Handicap at Haydock Park at the end of the month and recorded his first important victory, winning by eight lengths, ridden by Joe Mercer. He then won a moderate event over a mile and a half at his local Beverley Racecourse and then carried a big weight to victory in the Andy Capp Handicap at Redcar in early July, after which he was offered at odds of 8/1 for the St Leger Stakes. He then produced a creditable effort in defeat in a one-mile handicap at Beverley, finishing third under a weight of 141 pounds. When Gunner B contested the Gordon Stakes, a recognised St Leger trial at Goodwood however, he ran poorly and finished last of the six runners. Gunner B bypassed the St Leger, running instead in the Doonside Cup over eleven furlongs at Ayr Racecourse in which, ridden by Mercer, he was required to concede weight to older horses including Patch (Great Voltigeur Stakes), Rymer (Brigadier Gerard Stakes) and Dakota (St Simon Stakes, Ebor Handicap). Gunner B tracked the leader Patch before taking the lead two furlongs from the finish and won by half a length from Rymer. at a price of 12–1.

=== 1977: four-year-old season ===
After finishing unplaced on his debut as a four-year-old, Gunner B finished third to Lucky Wednesday and Relkino in the Westbury Stakes and third to Oats in the Ormonde Stakes. At Epsom Downs Racecourse in June, Gunner B started at odds of 12/1 in the Group Three Diomed Stakes over eight and a half furlongs. Ridden by Joe Mercer he recorded his first Group race win, beating Duke Ellington by half a length and followed up a week later by winning a minor race at Beverley. He went on to finish fourth to Lucky Wednesday in the Prince of Wales's Stakes at Royal Ascot and third to North Stoke in the Land of Burns Stakes at Ayr, before recording a half length win in a race for amateur riders over a mile at Newmarket Racecourse in August. He ran poorly on his only subsequent appearance two days later.

=== 1978: five-year-old season ===
Although he remained in the same ownership in 1978, Gunner B was transferred to the stable of Henry Cecil at Warren Place in Newmarket. Ridden by Joe Mercer (Cecil's stable jockey), he established himself as the best older horse of the season over ten furlongs. On his first appearance for his new trainer, Gunner B started at odds of 7/2 for the Group Three Earl of Sefton Stakes at Newmarket in April and won from Uncle Pokey and Gairloch. In the Brigadier Gerard Stakes on hard ground at Sandown Park Racecourse in May, the five-year-old started at 2/1 and won again, with Uncle Pokey and Gairloch again following home as he broke the course record established by Artaius in the 1977 Eclipse Stakes. At Royal Ascot in June, Gunner B started the 4/5 favourite for his second attempt to win the Prince of Wales's Stakes and won "without difficulty" from the Harry Wragg-trained gelding Fluellen and the Prix Messidor winner Malecite. In July, the horse faced a field which included Balmerino, Super Concorde, Radetzky (St James's Palace Stakes, Queen Anne Stakes) and Jellaby (Brigadier Gerard Stakes, Queen Anne Stakes) in the Group One Eclipse Stakes at Sandown. He was made the 7/4 second favourite behind Stradavinsky, a lightly raced but highly regarded three-year-old trained by Vincent O'Brien. Mercer positioned Gunner B just behind the leaders before moving forward early in the straight. He got the better of a protracted struggle with Radetzky to take the lead entering the final furlong and held off a late challenge from Balmerino to win by three-quarters of a length.

In August, Gunner B started second favourite behind The Derby runner-up Hawaiian Sound in the Benson and Hedges Gold Cup over ten and a half furlongs at York Racecourse in a field which also included Balmerino, Julio Mariner, Cistus (Nassau Stakes), More So (Irish 1,000 Guineas), Jellaby, Pyjama Hunt and Don (Lockinge Stakes). Hawaiian Sound took the lead soon after the start and although Gunner B mounted a sustained challenge in the straight he was never able to reach the three-year-old and finished second, beaten one and a half lengths. Gunner B was dropped in class for the Valdoe Stakes at Goodwood in September. He started the 4/9 favourite and won by half a length from the three-year-old Admiral's Launch, the winner of the Craven Stakes. Gunner B's final race was the Champion Stakes at Newmarket in October, in which he started third favourite behind Hawaiian Sound and the French filly Dancing Maid. He tracked Hawaiian Sound throughout the race, but was unable to quicken in the closing stages, finishing third of the ten runners behind Swiss Maid, beaten three lengths by the winner.

== Assessment ==
Gunner B did not receive a rating in the 1975 Free Handicap, which rated the best two-year-olds to have raced in Britain. The independent Timeform organisation gave him a rating of 106, making him twenty-four pounds inferior to their top-rated juvenile Manado. In the following year, Timeform described him as "a grand horse" and gave him a rating of 121 fourteen pounds the top-rated horse Youth. In the official British handicap for three-year-olds he was given a weight of 127 pounds, thirteen pounds behind the top-rated Vitiges. He failed to gain a rating in the inaugural International Classification for older horses in 1977, and was rated eighteen pounds behind the top-rated Balmerino in the British Handicap for horses aged four and above. His Timeform rating dropped to 116, although the organisation's annual Racehorses of 1977 described him as "thoroughly genuine and a doughty battler". In the International Classification for 1978, Gunner B was rated the fifth-best older male in Europe, behind Alleged, Buckskin, Crow and Guadanini. Timeform gave him a rating of 126, twelve pounds behind their Horse of the Year Alleged.

== Stud career ==
At the end of the 1978 season, Gunner B was syndicated for £9,000 a share, giving him a theoretical value of £360,000. He began his career a breeding stallion at the Limestone Stud in Lincolnshire at a fee of £3,000. After a brief spell in Germany he was moved to the Shade Oak Stud in Shropshire, where he remained for the rest of his life.

Gunner B's offspring made relatively little impact on the flat, apart from Royal Gait, an outstanding stayer who was controversially disqualified after winning the Ascot Gold Cup before going on to win the Champion Hurdle, and the Lincoln Handicap and Earl of Sefton Stakes winner K-Battery. After his return from Germany however, he became a very successful National Hunt stallion. Apart from Royal Gait, he sired the Grand National winner Red Marauder, the World Hurdle winner Iris's Gift, Red Striker (Peter Marsh Chase), Bobby Grant, Barrow Drive, Gunner Welburn, Swingit Gunner and Forest Gunner. He received several awards from the Thoroughbred Breeders' Association for his achievements as a sire of jumpers.

On 18 January 2003, Gunner B died of heart failure at Shade Oak and was buried at the stud. At the time of his death he was believed to be the oldest active stallion in Europe. The stud's owner, Peter Hockenhull said "He put us on the map – he's practically built this place ... a Gunner B would always win a race somewhere, somehow" and added "He had the vet out just twice in 13 years. He would have carried on this year, as the physical side of covering was not a problem, though with his age he did have declining fertility".

== Pedigree ==
Pedigree of Gunner B, chestnut stallion, 1973
Sire Royal Gunner (USA) 1962	Royal Charger (GB); 1942	Nearco	Pharos
Sire Royal Gunner (USA) 1962	Royal Charger (GB); 1942	Nearco	Nogara
Sire Royal Gunner (USA) 1962	Royal Charger (GB); 1942	Sun Princess	Solario
Sire Royal Gunner (USA) 1962	Royal Charger (GB); 1942	Sun Princess	Mumtaz Begum
Sire Royal Gunner (USA) 1962	Levee (USA); 1953	Hill Prince	Princequillo
Sire Royal Gunner (USA) 1962	Levee (USA); 1953	Hill Prince	Hildene
Sire Royal Gunner (USA) 1962	Levee (USA); 1953	Bourtrai	Stimulus
Sire Royal Gunner (USA) 1962	Levee (USA); 1953	Bourtrai	Escutcheon
Dam Sweet Councillor (GB) 1968	Privy Councillor (GB); 1959	Counsel	Court Martial
Dam Sweet Councillor (GB) 1968	Privy Councillor (GB); 1959	Counsel	Wheedler
Dam Sweet Councillor (GB) 1968	Privy Councillor (GB); 1959	High Number	His Highness
Dam Sweet Councillor (GB) 1968	Privy Councillor (GB); 1959	High Number	Lady Luck
Dam Sweet Councillor (GB) 1968	Sugarstick (GB); 1956	Zucchero	Nasrullah
Dam Sweet Councillor (GB) 1968	Sugarstick (GB); 1956	Zucchero	Castagnola
Dam Sweet Councillor (GB) 1968	Sugarstick (GB); 1956	York Gala	His Grace
Dam Sweet Councillor (GB) 1968	Sugarstick (GB); 1956	York Gala	Princess Galahad (Family 3-h)
