= Papillon (horse) =

Irish-bred Thoroughbred racehorse

- Sire: Lafontaine
- Dam: Glens Princess
- Damsire: Prince Hansel
- Sex: Gelding
- Foaled: 5 June 1991
- Died: 3 May 2017 (aged 25)
- Country: Ireland
- Colour: Bay
- Breeder: E McCormack
- Owner: Mrs J Maxwell Moran
- Trainer: Ted Walsh
- Record: 39: 9-5-2
- Earnings: £434,203

Major wins
- Ladbroke Trophy Chase (1998); Newlands Chase (1999); Grand National (2000); Paddy Power Dial-A-Bet Chase (1998, 2000)

Papillon (5 June 1991 – 3 April 2017) was an Irish racehorse formerly trained at Greenhills stables, in Kill, County Kildare. His most notable success was winning the 2000 Grand National.

Papillon was owned by American Mrs Betty Moran, owner of Brushwood Stable. She was not a fan of the Grand National and it took considerable persuasion before she would allow Papillon to be entered for the race in 2000.

Papillon had started the day with odds of 33–1 but was backed down to 10-1 by the time the race began. He was a first ever ride in the race for 20-year-old jockey Ruby Walsh, and was trained by Ruby's father Ted Walsh. When Papillon crossed the finishing line to win the world's richest steeplechase he became an instant punters' favourite. Papillon previously came a very close second in the 1998 Irish Grand National to Bobbyjo under top-weight.

In 2001 Papillon returned to Aintree to attempt to defend his winning record. However, conditions were completely different from the previous year, as the race was run on very heavy ground and Papillon carried more weight. He was brought down at the 19th fence but Ruby Walsh realised there would be very few completions and remounted the horse to finish last of the four finishers, earning £25,000 for doing so.

Papillon was retired at the end of the 2002/03 season, having earned his connections over £400,000 in win and place prize money.

Papillon died on 3 May 2017, aged 26.

== Grand National record ==
Grand National	Position	Jockey	Age	Weight	SP	Distance
2000	1st	Ruby Walsh	9	10–12	10/1	Won by 1¼ lengths
2001	4th	Ruby Walsh	10	11–5	14/1	Last to complete

== Pedigree ==
Pedigree of Papillon (IRE), Bay Gelding, 1991
Sire Lafontaine 1977	Sham; 1970	Pretense	Endeavour II
Sire Lafontaine 1977	Sham; 1970	Pretense	Imitation
Sire Lafontaine 1977	Sham; 1970	Sequoia	Princequillo
Sire Lafontaine 1977	Sham; 1970	Sequoia	The Squaw II
Sire Lafontaine 1977	Valva; 1965	Vandale (FRA)	Plassy
Sire Lafontaine 1977	Valva; 1965	Vandale (FRA)	Vanille
Sire Lafontaine 1977	Valva; 1965	Lilya (FRA)	Clarion (FRA)
Sire Lafontaine 1977	Valva; 1965	Lilya (FRA)	La Fougueuse
Dam Glens Princess 1977	Prince Hansel; 1961	The Phoenix	Chateau Bouscaut (FRA)
Dam Glens Princess 1977	Prince Hansel; 1961	The Phoenix	Fille de Poule
Dam Glens Princess 1977	Prince Hansel; 1961	Saucy Wilhelmina	William of Valence (FRA)
Dam Glens Princess 1977	Prince Hansel; 1961	Saucy Wilhelmina	Merry Perrin
Dam Glens Princess 1977	Deep Glen; 1972	Deep Run	Pampered King II
Dam Glens Princess 1977	Deep Glen; 1972	Deep Run	Trial by Fire (FRA)
Dam Glens Princess 1977	Deep Glen; 1972	Glenawina	Soldado
Dam Glens Princess 1977	Deep Glen; 1972	Glenawina	Rowley's Last
