= Red Alligator =

British-bred Thoroughbred racehorse

- Sire: Magic Red
- Grandsire: Link Boy
- Dam: Miss Alligator
- Damsire: Hyacinthus
- Sex: Gelding
- Foaled: 1959
- Country: England
- Colour: Bay
- Owner: Mr J. Manners
- Trainer: Denys Smith
- Earnings: around £40,000

Major wins
- Grand National (1968)

Red Alligator was a champion Thoroughbred racehorse who won the Grand National in 1968. He also came third the previous year and was favorite in 1969 but fell at the 19th fence. Red Alligator was the third horse in succession to carry exactly 10 stone. He was the fifth since the end of the Second World War to win while carrying exactly 10 stone in weight and began at 100-7.

== Grand National record ==
Red Alligator was a nine-year-old when he won in 1968. Owned by Mr J Manners, he was trained by Denys Smith in County Durham and ridden by Brian Fletcher. His S/P for the race was 100/7. Jockey Fletcher was 19 at the time and went on to ride Red Rum to his first two victories in the Grand National.

In the previous year's race, Fletcher had also ridden Red Alligator but had been one of the many whose chances were thwarted by the infamous “Foinavon pile up” at the 23rd fence. The jockey had remounted, but without a clear run up due to the melée took three attempts to clear the fence and finished third to Foinavon. Red Alligator was then favourite in the 1969 race but fell at the 19th fence. He was rumoured to be drugged in the stables before the start as he did not run anywhere near to his full potential

== Commemorations ==
Red Alligator's Grand National win was commemorated by a local brewery who renamed a pub near Denys Smith's farm outside Bishop Auckland in his honour. Smith was a regular in the popular pub/restaurant and told stories from his training days. The stables which housed Red Alligator were within a few hundred yards of the pub but have since been demolished. However, his photos are still featured in the pub named after him.

== See also ==
- Repeat winners of horse races
- 1968 Grand National
