= 1968 Grand National =

English steeplechase horse race

- Grand National
- Location: Aintree Racecourse
- Date: 30 March 1968
- Winning horse: Red Alligator
- Starting price: 100/7
- Jockey: Brian Fletcher
- Trainer: Denys Smith
- Owner: John Manners

External videos
- The 1968 Grand National in full (BBC)
- Highlights of the 1968 Grand National (British Pathé)

The 1968 Grand National was the 122nd renewal of the Grand National horse race that took place at Aintree Racecourse near Liverpool, England, on 30 March 1968.

The winner was the nine-year-old Red Alligator, by 20 lengths. He was ridden by jockey Brian Fletcher, who later rode Red Rum to victory in 1973 and 1974.

Tim Durant on Highlandie became the oldest jockey ever to complete the course at the age of 68.

== Finishing order ==
Position	Name	Jockey	Age	Handicap (st-lb)	SP	Distance
01	Red Alligator	Brian Fletcher	9	10-0	100/7	
02	Moidore's Token	Barry Brogan	11	10-8	100/6	
03	Different Class	David Mould	8	11-5	17/2	
04	Rutherfords	Pat Buckley	8	10-6	100/9	
05	The Fossa	Roy Edwards	11	10-4	28/1	
06	Valbus	Robin Langley	10	10-0	100/1	
07	Highland Wedding	Owen McNally	11	11-0	18/1	
08	Reynard's Heir	Tommy Kinane	8	10-4	28/1	
09	Princeful	Johnny Leech	10	10-4	66/1	
10	Steel Bridge	Eddie Harty	10	10-4	100/1	
11	Manifest	Richard Pitman	10	10-0	66/1	
12	San Angelo	Bill Rees	8	10-10	25/1	
13	Some Slipper	Ron Atkins	11	10-0	66/1	
14	French Kilt	Stan Mellor	8	10-0	100/7	
15	Highlandie	Tim Durant	11	10-12	100/1	
16	Dun Widdy	Arthur Moore	12	10-2	100/1	
17	Quintin Bay	Willie Robinson	12	10-0	66/1	Last to finish

== Non-finishers ==
Fence	Name	Jockey	Age	Handicap (st-lb)	Starting price	Fate
06	What A Myth	Paul Kelleway	11	12-0	28/1	Fell
23	Rondetto	Jeff King	12	10-12	33/1	Fell
01	Fort Ord	Tim Norman	8	10-9	35/1	Fell
27	Vultrix	Terry Biddlecombe	10	10-8	28/1	Pulled Up
09	Quitte Ou Double L	John Ciechanowski	8	10-8	66/1	Fell
09	Master Mascus	John Lawrence	9	10-6	66/1	Fell
27	Master Of Art	Ben Hanbury	8	10-2	100/7	Refused
06	Go-Pontinental	Macer Gifford	8	10-0	25/1	Fell
06	Ross Four	Peter Jones	7	10-0	100/1	Fell
16	Fort Knight	Roddy Reid	9	10-0	40/1	Fell
08	Mixed French	Gordon Holmes	9	10-0	100/1	Fell
27	Kirtle-Lad	John Enright	9	10-0	50/1	Fell
16	Polaris Missile	Nigel Thorne	9	10-0	66/1	Pulled Up
03	Beecham	Bob Davies	9	10-0	66/1	Fell
06	Valouis	Eamon Prendergast	9	10-1	40/1	Fell
26	Phemius	Gerry Scott	10	10-8	50/1	Pulled Up
27	Forcastle	William McLernon	10	10-8	50/1	Refused
09	Game Purston	David Cartwright	10	10-0	100/1	Refused
16	Willing Slave	Mick James	8	10-2	100/1	Pulled Up
16	Bassnet	David Nicholson	9	10-12	18/1	Brought Down
16	Foinavon	Phil Harvey	10	10/5	66/1	Brought Down
16	Ronald's Boy	John Harty	11	10-0	100/1	Brought Down
16	Champion Prince	Andrew Wates	9	10-12	66/1	Brought Down
06	Chu-Teh	Nick Gaselee	9	10-0	33/1	Brought Down
27	Chamoretta	David Elsworth	8	10-1	100/1	Refused
29	Regal John	Josh Gifford	10	10-8	100/7	Refused
09	Great Lark	Tommy Carberry	9	10-6	100/6	Refused
08	Portation	Gordon Cramp	10	10-0	100/1	Refused

== Media coverage ==
The race was shown in a special edition of Grandstand on the BBC which was presented by David Coleman. The commentary team remained the same as the previous year, Peter O'Sullevan, Bob Haynes, Michael O'Hehir and Michael Seth-Smith. This was to be the final Grand National commentary for Bob Haynes.
