= 2000 Grand National =

English steeplechase horse race

- Grand National
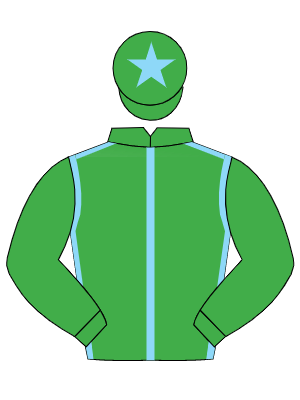
- Location: Aintree
- Date: 8 April 2000
- Winning horse: (Republic of Ireland) Papillon
- Starting price: 10/1
- Jockey: (Republic of Ireland) Ruby Walsh
- Trainer: (Republic of Ireland) Ted Walsh
- Owner: (United States) Mrs. J. Maxwell Moran

External videos
- Replay of the 2000 Grand National in full Racing TV, YouTube

The 2000 Grand National (known as the Martell Grand National for sponsorship reasons) was the 153rd official renewal of the Grand National steeplechase that took place at Aintree Racecourse in England on 8 April 2000.

The race was won in a time of 9 minutes 9.7 seconds and by a distance of 1 1/4 lengths by 10/1 shot Papillon, ridden by jockey Ruby Walsh. The winner was trained by his father Ted Walsh and ran in American Betty Moran's colours of green with ice blue piping. The field was limited to a maximum of 40 competitors of which 17 completed the course without mishap. None of the horses who failed to complete the course were injured.

== Racecard ==
No	Colours	Horse	Age	Handicap (st-lb)	SP	Jockey	Trainer
1		Young Kenny	9	12-00	14/1	Brendan Powell Snr	Peter Beaumont
2		Sunny Bay (IRE)	11	11-12	66/1	Chris Maude	Simon Sherwood
3		Escartefigue (FR)	8	11-09	50/1	Jimmy McCarthy	Paul Nicholls
4		Djeddah (FR)	9	11-08	16/1	Thierry Doumen	Francois Doumen
5		Bobbyjo (IRE)	10	11-06	12/1	Paul Carberry	Thomas Carberry
6		Listen Timmy (NZ)	10	11-05	50/1	Tony Dobbin	Alan King
7		The Last Fling (IRE)	10	11-05	14/1	Seamus Durack	Sue Smith
8		Stormy Passage (IRE)	10	11-03	50/1	Andrew Thornton	Philip Hobbs
9		Red Marauder	10	11-02	18/1	Richard Guest	Norman Mason
10		Addington Boy (IRE)	12	11-02	33/1	Adrian Maguire	Ferdy Murphy
11		Buck Rodgers (IRE)	11	11-00	50/1	Ken Whelan	Victor Bowens
12		Niki Dee (IRE)	10	10-13	25/1	Robbie Supple	Peter Beaumont
13		Papillon (IRE)	9	10-12	10/1	Ruby Walsh	Ted Walsh
14		Senor El Betrutti (IRE)	11	10-12	100/1	Carl Llewellyn	Susan Nock
15		Star Traveller	9	10-11	10/1	Richard Johnson	Henry Daly
16		Village King (IRE)	7	10-11	50/1	Jim Culloty	Philip Hobbs
17		Call It A Day (IRE)	10	10-11	50/1	Barry Geraghty	Alan King
18		Micko's Dream (IRE)	8	10-10	14/1	Jason Titley	Willie Mullins
19		Espirit De Cotte (FR)	8	10-08	50/1	Mick Fitzgerald	Nicky Henderson
20		Sparky Gale (IRE)	10	10-08	33/1	Brian Storey	Colin Parker
21		Feels Like Gold (IRE)	12	10-07	28/1	Brian Harding	Nicky Richards
22		Kendal Cavalier	10	10-06	33/1	Barry Fenton	Toby Balding
23		Lucky Town (IRE)	9	10-05	20/1	David Casey	Enda Bolger
24		Earthmover (IRE)	9	10-05	14/1	Joe Tizzard	Paul Nicholls
25		Hollybank Buck (IRE)	10	10-04	33/1	Peter Niven	Tony Martin
26		Royal Predica (FR)	6	10-04	50/1	Glenn Tormey	Martin Pipe
27		Kingdom Of Shades (USA)	10	10-04	50/1	Tom Jenks	Venetia Williams
28		Trinitro	9	10-03	100/1	Robert Bellamy	Rune Haugen
29		Torduff Express (IRE)	9	10-03	50/1	Robert Thornton	Paul Nicholls
30		The Gopher (IRE)	11	10-03	66/1	Warren Marston	David Wintle
31		Mely Moss (FR)	9	10-01	25/1	Norman Williamson	Charles Egerton
32		Dark Stranger (FR)	9	10-01	9/1 F	Tony McCoy	Martin Pipe
33		Choisty (IRE)	10	10-00	50/1	Robert Widger	Andrew Haynes
34		Flaked Oats (IRE)	11	10-00	50/1	Timmy Murphy	Paul Nicholls
35		Art Prince (IRE)	10	10-00	100/1	Dean Gallagher	Martin Pipe
36		Merry People (IRE)	12	10-00	40/1	Garrett Cotter	John Queally
37		Druid's Brook	11	10-00	66/1	Rupert Wakley	Kim Bailey
38		Brave Highlander (IRE)	12	10-00	50/1	Philip Hide	Josh Gifford
39		Camelot Knight	14	10-00	150/1	Ollie McPhail	Nigel Twiston-Davies
40		Celtic Giant	10	10-00	100/1	Bruce Gibson	Len Lungo

== Leading contenders ==
Dark Stranger was sent off as the 9/1 favourite, largely due to his being the mount of champion jockey Tony McCoy. The pairing had won the Mildmay of Flete Handicap Chase at the recent Cheltenham meeting but had yet to win a race over three miles. The favourite backers' hopes were dashed early in the race when McCoy took a heavy fall at the third fence.

Star Traveller was a regular winner of good three mile chases prior to finishing third in a three-mile chase at the Cheltenham festival. The mount of Richard Johnson was sent off at 10/1 and led for much of the race before being pulled up after going lame when hitting the 25th fence.

Papillon was the subject of a huge public gamble from 33/1 to 10/1 on the day of the race. The Irish trained runner had undergone an unusual preparation of hurdles but had previously been second in the Irish Grand National and Irish Hennessey Cognac Gold Cup. Ruby Walsh kept his mount in the leading group throughout before taking the lead four fences from home, going on to win by 1 1/4 lengths.

Bobbyjo was popular with the public having won the previous year's National and was sent off at 12/1. He was again partnered by Paul Carberry and featured prominently in the early stages of the race until making a bad mistake at the seventh fence. The pair were always struggling to stay in touch after that and finished 11th.

Earthmover was a top hunter chaser who had run steadily in three-mile chases, including the Welsh National where he finished third, leading many to view him as an ideal Aintree type. He was sent off at 14/1 and ridden by Joe Tizzard but the pair parted company at the fourth fence.

Micko's Dream was considered the form horse going into the race after winning two three-mile chases in January and February but was sent off at 14/1 due to concerns that the ground was not soft enough for him. His partnership with Jason Titley ended in a first-fence fall.

The Last Fling was also sent off at 14/1 after a string of encouraging performances over three miles during the season, although he was largely outpaced in the recent Cheltenham Gold Cup. Ridden by Seamus Durack, The Last Fling was always working hard to stay on the tail of the leading half-dozen before finishing seventh.

Young Kenny was regarded as a perfect Grand National horse after winning the Midlands Grand National, Scottish Grand National and Singer & Friedlander Grand National trial but was also faced with the task of trying to be the first horse to carry the 12 stone top weight to victory for over 20 years. He started at 14/1 with Brendan Powell in the saddle but the pair came to grief at the tenth fence.

The retirement of both Richard Dunwoody and Graham Bradley after the 1999 running left two-time former winner Carl Llewellyn as the most senior rider in the weighing room, weighing out for a National for the tenth time. Eventual winner Ruby Walsh was among five riders making their debut in the race with all the other debut riders acquitting themselves well. Future winner Barry Geraghty finished fifth with Ollie McPhail and Bruce Gibson also completing the course, while Jimmy McCarthy fell at the final fence.

== Finishing order ==
Position	Name	Jockey	Age	Weight (st, lb)	Starting price	Distance
1st	Papillon	Ruby Walsh	9	10-12	10/1	Won by 1 1/4 lengths
2nd	Mely Moss	Norman Williamson	9	10-01	25/1	12 lengths
3rd	Niki Dee	Robbie Supple	10	10-13	25/1	7 lengths
4th	Brave Highlander	Philip Hide	12	10-05	50/1	A neck
5th	Addington Boy	Adrian Maguire	12	11-02	33/1	3 lengths
6th	Call It A Day	Barry Geraghty	10	10-11	50/1	4 lengths
7th	The Last Fling	Seamus Durack	10	11-05	14/1	9 lengths
8th	Lucky Town	David Casey	9	10-05	20/1	2 lengths
9th	Djeddah	Thiery Doumen	9	11-08	16/1	27 lengths
10th	Hollybank Buck	Peter Niven	10	10-04	33/1	7 lengths
11th	Bobbyjo	Paul Carberry	10	11-06	12/1	4 lengths
12th	Kendal Cavalier	Barry Fenton	10	10-06	33/1	1 1/2 lengths
13th	Suny Bay	Chris Maude	11	11-12	66/1	11 lengths
14th	Feels Like Gold	Brian Harding	12	10-07	28/1	3/4 length
15th	Camelot Knight	Ollie McPhail	14	10-06	150/1	17 lengths
16th	Kingdom Of Shades	Tom Jenks	10	10-04	50/1	22 lengths
17th	Celtic Giant	Bruce Gibson	10	10-07	100/1	Last to complete

== Non-finishers ==
Fence	Name	Jockey	Age	Weight (st, lb)	Starting price	Fate
30th	Escartefiguer	Jimmy McCarthy	8	11-09	50/1	Fell
27th (open ditch)	Star Traveller	Richard Johnson	9	10-11	10/1	Pulled up lame
24th (Canal Turn)	Buck Rogers	Ken Whelan	11	11-00	50/1	Fell
22nd (Becher's Brook)	Esprit De Cotte	Mick Fitzgerald	8	10-08	50/1	Fell
22nd (Becher's Brook)	Stormy Passage	Andrew Thornton	10	11-03	50/1	Fell
20th	Flaked Oats	Timmy Murphy	11	10-03	50/1	Fell
20th	Village King	Jim Culloty	7	10-11	50/1	Fell
17th	Listen Timmy	Tony Dobbin	11	11-05	50/1	Pulled up
14th	Merry People	Garret Cotter	12	10-05	40/1	Unseated rider
13th	The Gopher	Warren Marston	11	10-03	66/1	Fell
13th	Torduff Express	Robert Thornton	9	10-03	50/1	Fell
12th	Druid's Brook	Rupert Wakley	11	10-05	66/1	Unseated rider
10th	Young Kenny	Brendan Powell	9	12-00	14/1	Fell
6th (Becher's Brook)	Red Marauder	Richard Guest	10	11-02	18/1	Fell
4th	Choisty	Robert Widger	10	10-00	50/1	Fell
4th	Earthmover	Joe Tizzard	9	10-05	14/1	Fell
3rd (open ditch)	Dark Stranger	Tony McCoy	9	10-01	9/1 F	Unseated rider
2nd	Sparky Gayle	Brian Storey	10	10-08	33/1	Unseated rider
1st	Micko's Dream	Jason Titley	8	10-10	14/1	Fell
1st	Trinitro	Robert Bellamy	9	10-03	100/1	Fell
1st	Royal Predica	Glen Tormey	6	10-04	50/1	Fell
1st	Senor El Betrutti	Carl Llewellyn	11	10-12	100/1	Fell
1st	Art Prince	Dean Gallagher	10	10-04	100/1	Fell

== Media coverage ==
The BBC retained the rights to broadcast the race live for 41st consecutive year and it was shown as a Grandstand Grand National special. Sue Barker made her debut as the anchor presenter, making her the fifth person and first woman to host the BBC broadcast. Barker presented the programme from the unsaddling enclosure, which was situated outside where the weighing room bar is today, with interviews with celebrity racegoers, connections of the competitors, former Aintree heroes and the winning connections after the race.

Coming towards the last in the National. Papillon led over it but here's Mely Moss on the nearside... They're racing towards the elbow and it's the plunge horse Papillon whose found a bit extra. He's sprinted two lengths in front for Ruby Walsh. Battling on in second is Mely Moss. They straighten up for home. A hundred yards left to go! Papillon on the nearside, Mely Moss the farside trying hard to wear him down. It's Papillon holding on with fifty yards left to go. And Papillon wins the Martell Grand National!

— Commentator Jim McGrath describes the climax of the race

The rest of the BBC team comprised Clare Balding as a roving reporter on the course and in the saddling boxes. Balding had also been the anchor presenter on BBC's coverage of the previous two days of the Aintree meeting. Angus Loughran brought betting news and Richard Dunwoody interviewed the riders in the weighing room. The racing commentary team for the third consecutive year was John Hanmer, Tony O'Hehir and lead commentator Jim McGrath who, for the third year, called the winner home.

A post-race re-run, using slow motion and additional camera angles, including inside fences was presented by Richard Pitman.

The BBC television pictures were also syndicated globally for international broadcast while independent television cameras were also on course to provide pictures and commentary for SIS, broadcast into UK bookmakers' outlets.

BBC Radio also presented a live race commentary for the 59th time since its first broadcast in 1927.

All of the major national daily newspapers in the UK published pullout sections of their Saturday morning editions ranging from four to sixteen pages with most including full colour guides of the competitors.
