= Tim Norman =

English jockey (1944–2023)

Tim Norman (21 March 1944 – 30 August 2023) was an English jockey known for his victory in the 1966 Grand National on the horse Anglo, which had odds of 50–1.

== Biography ==
Born in Ashcombe to a farmer from Devon, Norman's introduction to horse racing occurred when Lambourn trainer George Spann identified his potential at age 16.

By 1961, Norman marked his first win at Fontwell. He subsequently won the George Duller Hurdle at the 1964 Cheltenham Festival and had a total of 28 victories in the 1965–66 season, including the Grand National and the Welsh Grand National.

In 1967, Anglo's performance at the National was less successful, and the horse retired from racing shortly after. Prior to the 1966 Grand National, Anglo had limited successes that year, and even Fred Winter, the horse's trainer, expressed reservations about Anglo's chances. Complicating matters, Norman had been involved in a traffic incident a day before the race.

The 1966 Grand National was notable for several reasons. Anticipation surrounded the event due to concerns that it might be the last Grand National because of financial challenges faced by the owner, Mirabel Topham. The race also saw political involvement with figures such as Prime Minister Harold Wilson alluding to the importance of the event. Of the 109 horses entered for the race, only 47 started. The horse Freddie, known for placing second behind Arkle, was among the favorites. During the race, several horses faced challenges, particularly at the chair fence. Ultimately, Anglo secured a 20-length lead and won.

After a series of races, Norman retired in 1974 with 210 career wins. Post-retirement, he worked in construction, specifically for Lambourn trainers.
