= 1966 Grand National =

English steeplechase horse race

- Grand National
- Location: Aintree
- Date: 26 March 1966
- Winning horse: (Republic of Ireland) Anglo
- Starting price: 50/1
- Jockey: (England) Tim Norman
- Trainer: (England) Fred Winter
- Owner: (England) Stuart Levy
- Conditions: Soft

External videos
- BBC
- British Pathe Highlights

The 1966 Grand National was the 120th renewal of the Grand National horse race that took place at Aintree near Liverpool, England, on 26 March 1966.

The winner was Anglo by 20 lengths, giving Freddie second place for a second consecutive year. Forty-seven horses ran.

The winning jockey Tim Norman had been injured in a car crash two days earlier.

== Finishing order ==
Position	Name	Jockey	Age	Handicap (st-lb)	SP	Distance
01	Anglo	Tim Norman	8	10-0	50/1	Won by 20 lengths
02	Freddie	Pat McCarron	9	11-7	11/4 F	
03	Forest Prince	Gerry Scott	8	10-8	100/7	
04	The Fossa	Terry Biddlecombe	9	10-8	20/1	
05	Jim's Tavern	Nick Gaselee	9	10-0	100/1	
06	Quintin Bay	Jackie Cullen	10	10-0	100/1	
07	Norther	Peter Jones	9	10-0	100/1	
08	Highland Wedding	Owen McNally	9	10-0	15/2	
09	Vulcano	Josh Gifford	8	10-1	25/1	
10	Gale Force X	Bobby Coonan	9	10-0	50/1	
11	Big George	James Morrissey	11	10-0	33/1	
12	Loving Record	Ben Hannon	12	10-0	50/1	Last to complete

== Non-finishers ==
Fence	Name	Jockey	Age	Handicap (st-lb)	Starting price	Fate
22	What A Myth	Paul Kelleway	9	11-4	11/2	Fell
03	Rough Tweed	Pat Buckley	12	10-7	22/1	Fell
22	Kapeno	David Mould	9	10-6	100/7	Fell
06	Packed Home	Tommy Carberry	11	10-3	33/1	Fell
22	Greek Scholar	Michael Scudamore	7	10-4	50/1	Fell
26	Brown Diamond	Francis Shortt	11	10-0	100/1	Fell
06	Popham Down	Willie Robinson	9	10-0	22/1	Fell
17	Pontin-Go	Buck Jones	14	10-0	100/1	Fell
15	Game Purston	Paddy Cowley	8	10-0	100/1	Fell
22	Supersweet	David Crossley-Cooke	9	10-6	100/1	Fell
20	Major Hitch	Paddy Broderick	8	10-1	50/1	Fell
15	Irish Day	Jimmy Magee	10	10-0	40/1	Fell
19	Scottish Final	Johnny Gamble	9	10-0	100/1	Fell
21	Flamecap	Frankie Carroll	9	10-0	100/1	Unseated Rider
15	Black Spot	Jeremy Speid-Soote	9	10-0	100/1	Fell
28	Harry Black	Roy Court	9	10-0	100/1	Baulked
27	Flying Wild	Pat Taaffe	10	11-0	20/1	Pulled Up
22	Stirling	Bobby Beasley	10	10-11	28/1	Pulled Up
27	Vultrix	Stan Mellor	8	10-7	100/7	Pulled Up
20	Solimyth	John Lawrence	10	10-1	100/1	Pulled Up
27	April Rose	Major Piers Bengough	11	10-7	100/1	Pulled Up
27	L'Empereur	Duke of Alburquerque	12	10-2	100/1	Refused
14	Willow King	Liam McLoughlin	11	10-0	100/1	Pulled Up
27	Royal Ruse	Tim Hyde	8	10-0	100/1	Pulled Up
18	Mac's Flare	Robin Langley	10	10-0	100/1	Pulled Up
20	King Pin	Tim Durant	10	10-11	100/1	Pulled Up
19	In Haste	Johnny Leech	8	10-3	100/1	Pulled Up
27	My Gift	Tony Redmond	10	10-0	100/1	Pulled Up
15	Bold Biri	Johnny Lehane	10	10-0	100/1	Baulked
22	Valouis	Eamon Prendergast	7	10-0	50/1	Brought Down
22	Leslie	Michael Opperman	10	10-5	100/1	Brought Down
25	Dorimont	William Shand-Kydd	12	10-0	50/1	Unseated Rider
15	Fujino-O	Jeff King	7	12-0	100/1	Refused
15	Monarch's Thought	Gordon Cramp	12	10-0	100/1	Refused
06	Groomsman	Mr S Roberts	11	11-0	100/1	Refused

== Media coverage ==
David Coleman presented Grand National Grandstand on the BBC. The seventh successive year the race was broadcast live and the sixth time Coleman fronted the coverage. Peter O'Sullevan, Bob Haynes and Tony Preston were the commentators.
