= Anglo (horse) =

Irish-bred Thoroughbred racehorsee

- Sire: Greek Star
- Dam: Miss Alligator
- Damsire: Hyacinthus
- Sex: Gelding
- Foaled: 1958
- Country: Ireland
- Colour: Chestnut
- Owner: Stuart Levy
- Trainer: Fred Winter

Major wins
- Grand National (1966)

Anglo (foaled 1958) was an Irish-bred Thoroughbred racehorse who competed in National Hunt racing.

He is best known for winning the 1966 Grand National comfortably by 20 lengths despite being a newcomer and an outsider as well as being ridden by a jockey, Tim Norman, who had been in a bad traffic accident the day before the race.

== Background ==
Anglo was an Irish-bred chestnut sired by Greek Star out of Miss Alligator and was originally named Flag of Convenience. At two years old he started on Flats.

== Racing career ==
Under the training of Ryan Price, Anglo went from strength to strength winning over hurdles and winning four successive wins in novice chases. However, Price was banned from training and so Anglo came under the wing of Fred Winter.

Winter wanted Anglo to race in the Grand National but the horse had a lacklustre year with only one win at Windsor and poor form. As such he entered the 1966 Grand National as a 50/1 outsider.

To make matters worse his original jockey, Eddie Harty, was injured on the day and so jockey Tim Norman was forced to ride despite having been involved in a serious traffic accident the day before.

The race was steady with all riders staying in until The Chair fence after which riders began to drop off leading to Anglo advancing up the field and catching up with leader Forest Prince before Anglo's superior stamina allowed him to push on as Forest Prince faded. Anglo won the race with a remarkable 20 length victory.

The following season, in preparation for the 1967 Grand National, Anglo managed to win a small race at Worcester which saw him start the National as joint fourth favourite under jockey Bobby Beasley.

From the start he had a poor race and soon tailed away before pulling up at fence 15. After this dismal performance he only raced for one more season, failing to win in five starts including being pulled up in the Hennessy Cognac Gold Cup. His last race was at Lingfield in February 1968 after which he was retired.

== Grand National record ==
Grand National	Position	Jockey	Age	Weight	SP	Distance
1966	1st	Tim Norman	8	10-0	50/1	Won by 20 lengths
1967	DNF	Bobby Beasley	9	11-1	100/8	Pulled up at fence 15

== Pedigree ==
Pedigree of Anglo (IRE), chestnut gelding, 1958
Sire Greek Star (GB) 1941	Hyperion (GB)*; 1930	Gainsborough (GB)*	Bayardo (GB)*
Sire Greek Star (GB) 1941	Hyperion (GB)*; 1930	Gainsborough (GB)*	Rosedrop (GB)*
Sire Greek Star (GB) 1941	Hyperion (GB)*; 1930	Selene (GB)*	Chaucer (GB)*
Sire Greek Star (GB) 1941	Hyperion (GB)*; 1930	Selene (GB)*	Serenissima (GB)*
Sire Greek Star (GB) 1941	Nebular (IRE); 1929	Bachelors Double (IRE)	Tredennis (GB)
Sire Greek Star (GB) 1941	Nebular (IRE); 1929	Bachelors Double (IRE)	Lady Bawn (IRE)
Sire Greek Star (GB) 1941	Nebular (IRE); 1929	Astraea (GB)	Sunstar (GB)*
Sire Greek Star (GB) 1941	Nebular (IRE); 1929	Astraea (GB)	Scotch Gift (GB)
Dam Miss Alligator (GB) 1946	Hyacinthus (IRE); 1938	Hyperion (GB)*	Gainsborough (GB)*
Dam Miss Alligator (GB) 1946	Hyacinthus (IRE); 1938	Hyperion (GB)*	Selene (GB)*
Dam Miss Alligator (GB) 1946	Hyacinthus (IRE); 1938	Sweet Wall (IRE)	Cygnus (GB)*
Dam Miss Alligator (GB) 1946	Hyacinthus (IRE); 1938	Sweet Wall (IRE)	Dark Eyes (IRE)
Dam Miss Alligator (GB) 1946	Girl O The Hills (IRE); 1941	Landscape Hill (IRE)	Spion Kop (GB)
Dam Miss Alligator (GB) 1946	Girl O The Hills (IRE); 1941	Landscape Hill (IRE)	Young Stella (GB)*
Dam Miss Alligator (GB) 1946	Girl O The Hills (IRE); 1941	Wily Girl (IRE)	Sea Serpent (GB)
Dam Miss Alligator (GB) 1946	Girl O The Hills (IRE); 1941	Wily Girl (IRE)	Lucky Girl (GB)

* Anglo is inbred 2S x 3D to the stallion Hyperion, meaning that he appears second generation on the sire side of his pedigree, and third generation on the dam side of his pedigree.

* Anglo is inbred 3S x 4D x 5D to the stallion Gainsborough, meaning that he appears third generation on the sire side of his pedigree, and fourth generation and fifth generation (via Young Stella) on the dam side of his pedigree.

* Anglo is inbred 4S x 5D to the stallion Sunstar, meaning that he appears fourth generation on the sire side of his pedigree, and fifth generation (via Cygnus) on the dam side of his pedigree.
