= Paddy Power Cheltenham Countdown Podcast Handicap Chase =

Steeplechase horse race in Britain

freebets.com Trophy Chase
2026
Donnacha	Jagwar	Javert Allen

Previous years
2023
Il Ridoto	Fugitif	Precious Eleanor
2022
Torn And Frayed	Galahad Quest	Spiritofthegames

2020-2011
2020
Cepage	Spiritofthegames	Lalor
2019
Siruh Du Lac	Janika	Ballyhill
2018
Frodon	Shantou Flyer	King's Odyssey
2017
Foxtail Hill	Saphir Du Rheu	Tenor Nivernais
2016
Annacotty	Tenor Nivernais	Lost Legend
2015
Annacotty	Big Fella Thanks	Tap Night
2014
Wishfull Thinking	Double Ross	Tap Night
2013
Katenko	Fruity O'Rooney	Nadiya De La Vega
2012
The Giant Bolster	Poquelin	Billie Magern
2011
Wishfull Thinking	Calgary Bay	Bakbenscher

2010-2001
2010
The Sawyer	Private Be	Mister McGoldrick
2009
The Sawyer	Akilak	Too Forward
2008
Maljimar	Burntoakboy	Preacher Boy
2007
Whispered Secret	New Alco	Idole First
2005
Buckby Lane	Kandjar D'allier	Palarshan
2004
Hunters Tweed	Kelrev	La Landiere
2003
Lady Cricket	Shamawan	Hermes III
2002
Foly Pleasant	Lady Cricket	Just Jasmine
2001
Young Spartacus	Red Marauder	Robbo

2000-1993
2000
Makounji	Celibate	Storm Damage
1999
Dr Leunt	Storm Damage	Even Flow
1998
Papillon	Pete The Parson	Dublin Flyer
1997
Dublin Flyer	Addington Boy	Hill Of Tullow
1995
Couldnt Be Better	Southolt	Beech Road
1994
Waterloo Boy	Richville	Southern Minstrel
1993
Ryde Again	Beech Road	Repeat The Dose

The Paddy Power Cheltenham Countdown Podcast is a Premier Handicap National Hunt steeplechase in Great Britain which is open to horses aged five years or older. It is run on the New Course at Cheltenham over a distance of about 2 miles and 4½ furlongs (2 miles 4 furlongs and 127 yards, or 4,139 metres) and during the race there are 17 fences to be jumped. It is a handicap race, and is scheduled to take place each year in late January. Prior to 2014 it was run as the Murphy Group Chase and from 2014 to 2016 it was sponsored by freebets.com It is currently sponsored by the Paddy Power bookmaking company.

The race was first run in 1993 and was awarded Listed status in 2002, when it was known as the Ladbroke Trophy Chase. It was awarded Grade 3 status in 2005 and re-classified as a Premier Handicap in 2023.

== Winners ==
Year	Winner	Age	Weight	Jockey	Trainer
1993	Ryde Again	10	11-09	Mark Pitman	Jenny Pitman
1994	Waterloo Boy	11	12-00	Richard Dunwoody	David Nicholson
1995	Couldnt Be Better	8	10-04	Graham Bradley	Charlie Brooks
1996	Abandoned due to frost
1997	Dublin Flyer	11	12-00	Brendon Powell Snr	Tim Forster
1998	Papillon	7	10-03	Norman Williamson	Ted Walsh
1999	Dr Leunt	8	10-03	Norman Williamson	Philip Hobbs
2000	Makounji	6	10-08	Mick Fitzgerald	Nicky Henderson
2001	Young Spartacus	8	10-09	Richard Johnson	Henry Daly
2002	Foly Pleasant	8	11-10	Jim Culloty	Henrietta Knight
2003	Lady Cricket	9	11-12	Tony McCoy	Martin Pipe
2004	Hunters Tweed	8	10-03	Graham Lee	Peter Beaumont
2005	Buckby Lane	9	10-04	Tom Doyle	Paul Webber
2006	Abandoned due to frost
2007	Whispered Secret	8	10-03	Rodi Greene	David Pipe
2008	Maljimar	8	10-07	Daryl Jacob	Nick Williams
2009	The Sawyer	9	10-00	Will Kennedy	Bob Buckler
2010	The Sawyer	10	10-10	Nathan Sweeney	Bob Buckler
2011	Wishfull Thinking	8	11-03	Richard Johnson	Philip Hobbs
2012	The Giant Bolster	7	10-03	Tom Scudamore	David Bridgwater
2013	Katenko	7	10-13	Aidan Coleman	Venetia Williams
2014	Wishfull Thinking	11	11-12	Richard Johnson	Philip Hobbs
2015	Annacotty	7	11-08	Gavin Sheehan	Martin Keighley
2016	Annacotty	8	11-09	Ian Popham	Alan King
2017	Foxtail Hill	8	10-00	Jamie Bargary	Nigel Twiston-Davies
2018	Frodon	6	11-07	Bryony Frost	Paul Nicholls
2019	Siruh Du Lac	6	10-06	Lizzie Kelly	Nick Williams
2020	Cepage	8	11-12	Charlie Deutsch	Venetia Williams
2021	Abandoned due to waterlogging
2022	Torn and Frayed	8	10-10	Sam Twiston-Davies	Nigel Twiston-Davies
2023	Il Ridoto	6	10-12	Harry Cobden	Paul Nicholls
2024	Ga Law	8	11-08	Gavin Sheehan	Jamie Snowden
2025	Moon D'Orange	7	10-05	Sean Bowen	John McConnell
2026	Donnacha	8	10-08	James Davies	Nigel Hawke

== See also ==
- Horse racing in Great Britain
- List of British National Hunt races
