= Jim O'Hehir =

Irish Gaelic games trainer (1887–1957)

Personal information
- Native name: Séamus Ó hEithir (Irish)
- Born: 13 May 1887 Ballynacally, County Clare, Ireland
- Died: 17 April 1957 (aged 69) Whitehall, Dublin, Ireland
- Occupation: Civil servant

Sport
Inter-county titles as manager
County	League	Province	All-Ireland
Clare Leitrim	1; 0	1; 1	1; 1

James O'Hehir (13 May 1887 - 17 April 1957) was an Irish civil servant and hurling and Gaelic football trainer.

== Biography ==
Born in Ballynacally, County Clare, O'Hehir joined the civil service in London in 1907. The following year he was transferred to Dublin where he worked in the Department of Local Government until his retirement. A keen sportsman, he trained the Clare senior hurling team which, in 1914, won their first ever All-Ireland Championship. In the 1927 season he acceded to a request to become trainer of the Leitrim senior football team and guided them to their inaugural Connacht Senior Football Championship win.

O'Hehir died from prostate cancer on 17 April 1957. He was survived by his wife and son, Michael O'Hehir.

== Honours ==
Clare

- All-Ireland Senior Hurling Championship (1): 1914
- Munster Senior Hurling Championship (1): 1914

Leitrim

- Connacht Senior Football Championship (1): 1927
