= Denys Smith =

British racehorse trainer (1924–2016)

Denys Smith (13 August 1924 – 13 November 2016) was a British racehorse trainer whose horses competed in both Flat racing and National Hunt racing. Smith's training stables were located at Bishop Auckland in County Durham. He trained the winners of over 1,600 races during a 45-year career and gained his biggest success when Red Alligator won the 1968 Grand National.

Smith worked as a taxi driver before his joining his father-in-law, Bert Richardson, as a cattle dealer. Richardson owned horses which took part in harness racing and Smith assisted him with buying horses and training them before moving on to training point-to-point horses. He eventually became a fully licensed trainer himself and sent out his first winner in 1958 with Owen's Mark at Sedgefield Racecourse. His first Flat race winner came in 1964 when Miss Autumn won at Aintree Racecourse. In 1969–70 and 1970 Smith became the first trainer to send out 50 winners in consecutive National Hunt and Flat seasons. He retired from training in 2002 and had his final winner with Monksford at Hamilton Park Racecourse in July of that year.

== Major wins ==
- Grand National – (1) – Red Alligator (1968)
- Gloucestershire Hurdle – (1) – King Cutler (1968)
- Middle Park Stakes – (1) – Tudenham (1972)
- Flying Childers Stakes – (1) – Mandrake Major (1976)
