= John Buckingham (jockey) =

John Buckingham (10 July 1940 – 22 December 2016) was an English National Hunt jockey, best known for riding Foinavon to victory in the 1967 Grand National.

Buckingham was born at Five Ways, Hatton, Warwickshire, one of the four children of Nancy Bewley and Thomas Buckingham. He was apprenticed aged 15 to the trainer Edward Courage in Oxfordshire. His first win came at Southwell on Sahagun in 1959.

Buckingham had never ridden in the Grand National when, a few days before the race in 1967, he was offered the ride on outsider Foinavon, a ride that had already been turned down by three jockeys.

Foinavon started the Grand National at odds of 100/1. Neither his trainer nor his owner were at Aintree, trainer John Kempton having gone to Worcester to ride another of his horses. Of the 44 starters, 28 were still in the race as they approached Becher's Brook on the second circuit, with Foinavon going well in 22nd place, just behind the favourite Honey End. Leading the field were two riderless horses, Popham Down and April Rose. As they approached the 23rd fence (the one after Becher's) Popham Down veered to his right and ran across the fence, causing a pile-up. As horses refused, crashed into each other and ran up and down the fence, Foinavon was one of only two horses to find a gap, clear the fence, and carry on. John Buckingham described how Foinavon had slowed to a canter and jumped the fence off his hocks, like a showjumper. (The other horse to clear the fence at the first attempt was Packed Home, who had been in last place and eventually finished fifth). At the next obstacle, the Canal Turn, Foinavon had a lead of 30 lengths as horses that had been put again to the 23rd fence after the pile-up, some of them remounted, gave chase. At the finish he was still fifteen lengths clear of the second horse, Honey End. In the winner's enclosure, the blue sash was put on Foinavon by former jockey Tim Brookshaw and Buckingham was interviewed: "Everything seemed to stop in front of me. I managed to pull onto the outside. I nearly got stopped by two loose horses... after he jumped it, we were just on our own. I couldn’t believe it. It was wonderful."

Buckingham rode in three more Nationals, finishing every time. In 1971 he retired as a jockey and set up a business as a jockeys' valet with his brother Tom.

In 1966 Buckingham married Ann Chater. The couple lived in Chipping Warden, Northamptonshire, and had two daughters, Laura and Lucy.
