= Newlands Chase =

Steeplechase horse race in Ireland

Newlands Chase
2024
Ferny Hollow	Rebel Gold	Espanito Bello

Previous years
2023
Rebel Gold	Coeur Sublime	Battleoverdoyen
2022
Captain Guinness	Blackbow	Cash Back
2021
Cilaos Emery	Daly Tiger	Kildorrery

2020-2011
2020
Any Second Now	Articulum	Hardline
2019
Cadmium	Doctor Phoenix	Tycoon Prince
2018
Doctor Phoenix	Alisier D'irlande	American Tom
2018
Doctor Phoenix	Alisier D'irlande	American Tom
2017
Alisier D'irlande	Pairofbrowneyes	Westerners Son
2016
Days Hotel	Twinlight	Simply Ned
2015
Mallowney	Rathlin	Twinlight
2014
Days Hotel	Toner D'Oudairies	Twinlight
2013
Days Hotel	Realt Dubh	Call The Police
2012
Seabass	Zaarito	Saludos
2011
Golden Silver	Made In Taipan	Mansony

2010-2001
2010
Tranquil Sea	Natal	Snowy Morning
2009
Carthalawn	Schindlers Hunt	Mansony
2008
Maralan	Benefit Night	Vintage Treasure
2007
Nickname	Gemini Lucy	Lakil Princess
2006
Sir Oj	Nickname	Green Belt Flyer
2005
Central House	Native Upmanship	Scarthy Lad
2004
Strong Run	Native Scout	Native Upmanship
2003
Arctic Copper	Fadoudal Du Cochet	Go Roger Go
2002
Knife Edge	Over The Furze	Arctic Copper
2001
Moscow Express	Knife Edge	Klairon Davis

2000-1991
2000
His Song	Danoli	Jeffell
1999
Papillon	Opera Hat	Hill Society
1998
Opera Hat	Corket	The Crazy Bishop
1997
Opera Hat	Merry Gale	Royal Mountbrowne
1996
Opera Hat	Strong Platinum	Who's To Say
1994
Jassu	Bob Devani	Royal Mountbrowne
1993
Guesswork	Balda Boy	Tennessee Pass
1992
Baptismal Fire	For William	Your On Your Own
1991
Kiichi	Irish Wind	Friendly Saint

1990-1988
1990
Galalith	Charlie Lucky	Frozen Friend
1989
First Noel	Time For Gold	Lady Mearlane
1988
Flying Ferret	Galalith	Bosphorus

The Newlands Chase is a Grade 3 National Hunt steeplechase in Ireland which is open to horses aged five years or older. It is run at Naas over a distance of about 2 miles (3,218 metres) and during the race there are 10 fences to be jumped. The race is scheduled to take place each year in late February or early March.

The race was run as a handicap until 1994, was not run in 1995, and returned in 1996 as a Listed race. The race was raised to Grade 2 status in 2003 and was downgraded to Grade 3 in 2017. It is currently sponsored by Paddy Power bookmakers and run under a sponsored title.

== Records ==
Most successful horse since 1988 (3 wins):

- Opera Hat – 1996, 1997, 1998
- Days Hotel - 2013, 2014, 2016

Leading jockey since 1988 (4 wins):

- Anthony Powell – Flying Ferret (1988), Guesswork (1993), Opera Hat (1996, 1997)
- Ruby Walsh - Papillon (1999), Moscow Express (2001), Nickname (2007), Seabass (2012)
- Paul Carberry - Arctic Copper (2003), Strong Run (2004), Central House (2005), Sir Oj (2006)

Leading trainer since 1988 (5 wins):

- Henry de Bromhead - Days Hotel (2013, 2014, 2016), Alisier D'Irlande (2017), Captain Guinness (2022)

== Winners since 1988 ==
Year	Winner	Age	Jockey	Trainer
1988	Flying Ferret	7	Anthony Powell	A Redmond
1989	First Noel	9	Conor O'Dwyer	J R Cox
1990	Galalith	11	D McGoona (Note: amateur jockey)	Francis Ennis
1991	Kiichi	6	Brendan Sheridan	Dermot Weld
1992	Baptismal Fire	8	Conor O'Dwyer	Paddy Mullins
1993	Guesswork	7	Anthony Powell	R H Lalor
1994	Jassu	8	Charlie Swan	John E Kiely
1995	No race
1996	Opera Hat	8	Anthony Powell	John Fowler
1997	Opera Hat	9	Anthony Powell	John Fowler
1998	Opera Hat	10	Garret Cotter	John Fowler
1999	Papillon	8	Ruby Walsh	Ted Walsh
2000	His Song	7	Adrian Maguire	Mouse Morris
2001	Moscow Express	9	Ruby Walsh	Frances Crowley
2002	Knife Edge	7	Tom Rudd	Michael O'Brien
2003	Arctic Copper	9	Paul Carberry	Noel Meade
2004	Strong Run	11	Paul Carberry	Noel Meade
2005	Central House	8	Paul Carberry	Dessie Hughes
2006	Sir Oj	9	Paul Carberry	Noel Meade
2007	Nickname	8	Ruby Walsh	Martin Brassil
2008	Maralan	7	John Cullen	Patrick O'Brady
2009	Carthalawn	8	Niall Madden	Charles Byrnes
2010	Tranquil Sea	8	Andrew McNamara	Edward O'Grady
2011	Golden Silver	9	Paul Townend	Willie Mullins
2012	Seabass	9	Ruby Walsh	Ted Walsh
2013	Days Hotel	8	Andrew Lynch	Henry de Bromhead
2014	Days Hotel	9	Andrew Lynch	Henry de Bromhead
2015	Mallowney	9	Davy Russell	Timothy Doyle
2016	Days Hotel	11	Andrew Lynch	Henry de Bromhead
2017	Alisier D'Irlande	7	David Mullins	Henry de Bromhead
2018	Doctor Phoenix	10	Davy Russell	Gordon Elliott
2019	Cadmium	7	Paul Townend	Willie Mullins
2020	Any Second Now	8	Mark Walsh	Ted Walsh
2021	Cilaos Emery	9	Paul Townend	Willie Mullins
2022	Captain Guinness	7	Rachael Blackmore	Henry de Bromhead
2023	Rebel Gold	10	Denis O'Regan	Pat Foley
2024	Ferny Hollow	9	Paul Townend	Willie Mullins

== See also ==
- Horse racing in Ireland
- List of Irish National Hunt races
