= Bobbyjo =

Irish-bred Thoroughbred racehorse (1990 - 2001)

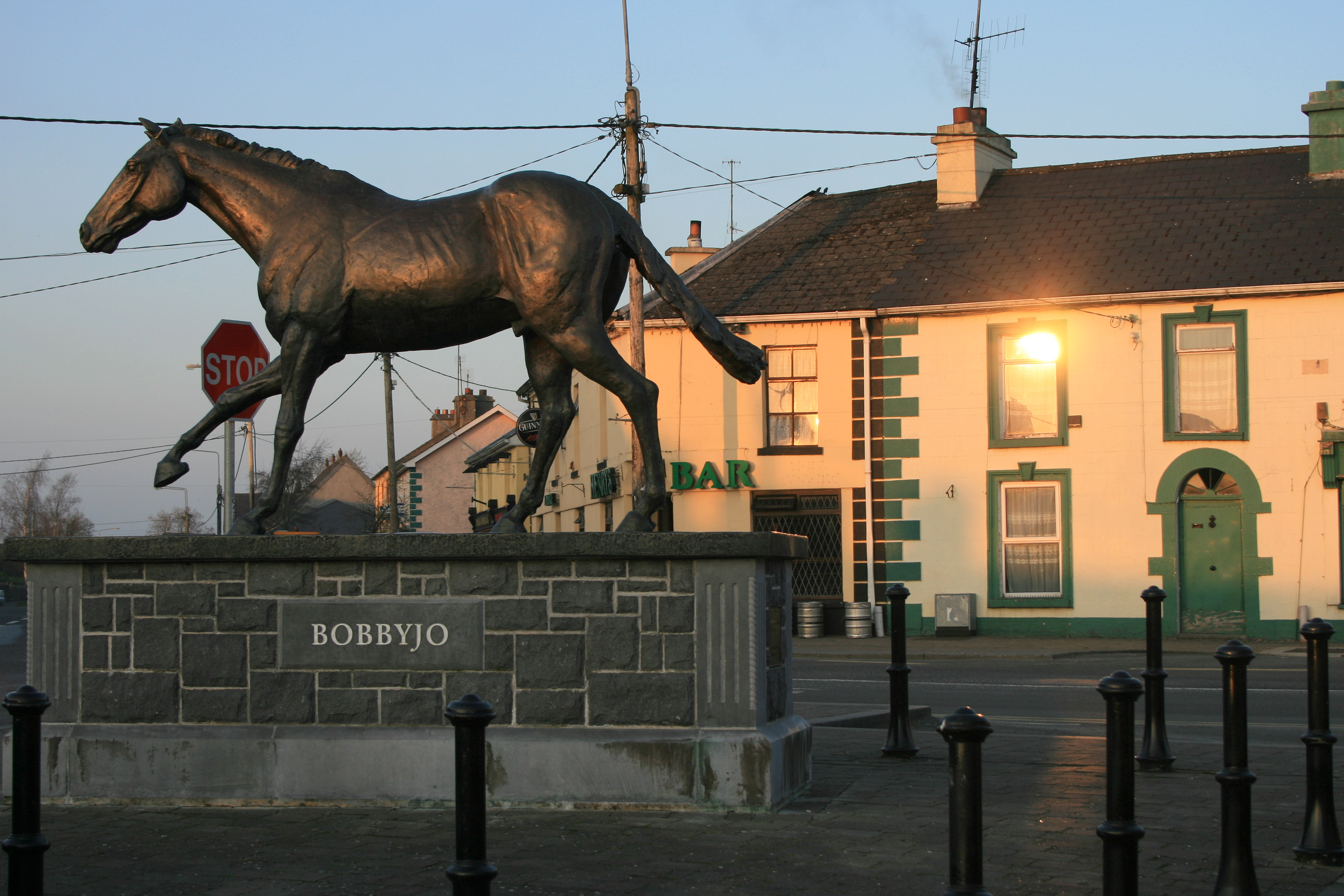
- Statue of Bobbyjo in Mountbellew, County Galway
- Sire: Bustineto
- Grandsire: Bustino
- Dam: Markup
- Damsire: Appiani
- Sex: Gelding
- Foaled: 5 May 1990
- Country: Ireland
- Colour: Bay
- Breeder: Liam Skehan
- Owner: Robert Burke
- Trainer: Tommy Carberry
- Record: 48: 8-6-2
- Earnings: £345,695

Major wins
- Irish Grand National (1998); Grand National (1999)
- Last updated on February 11, 2010

Bobbyjo (1990 – 2001) was an Irish bred racehorse by Bustineto and Markup, best remembered as the winner of the 1999 Grand National steeplechase at Aintree. Bobbyjo was owned by Bobby Burke Mullaghmore, County Galway.

== Humble Beginnings ==
In 1991, Bobby Burke and his brother Eugene, who was breeding horses himself, met in Galway with businessman and auctioneer Liam Mulryan. They bought six horses from Liam. One was named Bobbyjo and spent the next few years at Eugene's farm in Mullaghmore before being sent for training with Tommy Carberry in July 1995. Bobbyjo was an Irish bred racehorse by Bustineto and Markup. The name Bobbyjo was created by joining Bobby's name with that of his wife Jo.

== Grand National Success ==
Bobbyjo arrived at Aintree in 1999 having won the Irish Grand National in 1998, however this was not regarded at the time as a good pointer to Grand National success as Irish trained runners had failed to win the race for twenty-four years. On the day Bobbyjo was the subject of a huge gamble that saw him sent off at the short odds of 10/1 with Paul Carberry, the son of the trainer Tommy in the saddle. As coincidence had it, Tommy had been the rider twenty-four years earlier, the last time an Irish trained runner had won the race.

The victory signalled an upturn in fortunes for Irish trained runners in the decade that followed, though he himself completed the course well beaten when defending his crown in 2000.

=== Death of Bobbyjo ===
Bobbyjo broke a knee at Fairyhouse Racecourse in February 2001 and was put down one month later due to his incurable injuries. In memorial of the horse, a new steeplechase first run at Fairyhouse Racecourse in February 2003 has been named after him.

== Pedigree ==
Pedigree of Bobbyjo
Sire Bustineto 1978	Bustino 1971	Busted	Crepello
Sire Bustineto 1978	Bustino 1971	Busted	Sans le Sou
Sire Bustineto 1978	Bustino 1971	Ship Yard	Doutelle
Sire Bustineto 1978	Bustino 1971	Ship Yard	Paving Stone
Sire Bustineto 1978	Petipa 1973	Habitat	Sir Gaylord
Sire Bustineto 1978	Petipa 1973	Habitat	Little Hut
Sire Bustineto 1978	Petipa 1973	Twaddle	Tim Tam
Sire Bustineto 1978	Petipa 1973	Twaddle	Blarney Bess
Dam Markup 1974	Appiani 1963	Herbager	Vandale
Dam Markup 1974	Appiani 1963	Herbager	Flagette
Dam Markup 1974	Appiani 1963	Angela Rucellai	Rockefella
Dam Markup 1974	Appiani 1963	Angela Rucellai	Aristareta
Dam Markup 1974	Markive 1960	Archive	Nearco
Dam Markup 1974	Markive 1960	Archive	Book Law
Dam Markup 1974	Markive 1960	Market Deal	Straight Deal
Dam Markup 1974	Markive 1960	Market Deal	Pixie Market

== See also ==
- Bobbyjo Chase
