= 1999 Grand National =

English steeplechase horse race

- Grand National
- Location: Aintree
- Date: 10 April 1999
- Winning horse: (Republic of Ireland) Bobbyjo
- Starting price: 10/1
- Jockey: (Republic of Ireland) Paul Carberry
- Trainer: (Republic of Ireland) Tommy Carberry
- Owner: Robert Burke

External videos
- 1999 Grand National in full Racing UK, BBC Sport, YouTube

The 1999 Grand National (known as the Martell Grand National for sponsorship reasons) was the 152nd official renewal of the world-famous Grand National steeplechase that took place at Aintree near Liverpool, England, on 10 April 1999.

The race was won in a time of nine minutes and 14.1 seconds and by a distance of ten lengths by 10/1 shot Bobbyjo, ridden by jockey Paul Carberry. The winner was trained by Tommy Carberry in Ratoath, Ireland, and ran in the colours of London-based Irish businessman Bobby Bourke. 32 runners took part and 18 completed the course without mishap, but Eudipe suffered a fatal fall at Becher's Brook.

== Rule changes ==
1999 saw the conditions of the race change with the introduction of new rules for the 48-hour declaration stage. This brought in a system where horses numbered 41-43 were made reserves for the race and allowed to get into the final 40 should any runner withdraw by noon on the eve of the race. The rule was not required this year as less than 40 declared to run.

A ruling was also introduced banning the practice of running a horse in the Grand National and any other race in the three-day meeting. This brought to an end the practice of horses running over the National course on the Thursday or Friday before running in the National on Saturday, although by 1999 such instances had become very rare.

== Leading contenders ==
Fiddling The Facts was made the 6/1 favourite on the day of the race after a series of impressive, albeit not victorious, runs during the season. The mare had been third in the Hennessy Gold Cup at Newbury the previous November and followed that by finishing second in the Welsh National, Singer & Friedlander Grand National Trial and Greenalls Grand National Trial in the build-up to the National itself. The horse was partnered by 1996 winning rider Mick Fitzgerald, and moved into the leading half-dozen as the field approached the racecourse for the end of the first circuit. They remained prominent until falling at Becher's Brook on the second circuit when lying seventh.

Call It A Day had won the Whitbread Gold Cup at Sandown the previous April and prepared for the National by finishing second in the Midlands Grand National three weeks before Aintree. Richard Dunwoody took the ride and as the most experienced rider in the race the two-time former winner joined a group of eleven men to have weighed out for fourteen Nationals. Call It A day was sent off at 7/1 and moved into contention on the second circuit to form part of a group of eight with a chance turning for home and took the final flight half a length down in second place. Within strides he had been passed by the eventual winner and although he rallied on the run-in he finished ten lengths and a neck down in third place. 1999 was Dunwoody's last National as he later retired on medical grounds when advised he stood an increasing risk of serious neck injury if he suffered many more riding falls.

Double Thriller was a hunter chaser who had run impressively to finish fourth in the previous month's Cheltenham Gold Cup, being installed as favourite for the National in the process. His restrictive odds on raceday led most in attendance on course on race day to oppose him with the result he drifted to 7/1 joint-second favourite at the off. Joe Tizzard took the ride but their partnership came to an end at the first fence. When the racecourse commentator called the horse's exit it was unusually met with a huge cheer from the crowd who had backed against him.

Addington Boy had been one place behind Double Thriller in the Gold Cup, having earlier finished third in the Irish Hennessy Cognac Gold Cup at Leopardstown in February. Adrian Maguire took the ride on the 10/1 shot who was among the leading eight turning for home but was unable to quicken into the last fence, finishing over 17 lengths behind the winner in fourth.

Bobbyjo had won the 1998 Irish Grand National and was the believed to be the best contender to halt a 24-year drought for Irish-trained runners in the National. The horse was unusually prepped in a minor hurdles race and remained freely available at odds as long as 40/1 until race day when his priced was slashed down to 10/1 at the off. Paul Carberry took the ride and steered the horse wide of his rivals at the final flight to lead up the run-in and score by 10 lengths.

Eudipe had finished second in the 1998 Scottish Grand National and fourth in the Welsh National but it was his win in the Anthony Mildmay and Peter Cazelet Memorial Chase at Sandown in January that attracted the attention of punters. His 10/1 starting price also had a lot to do with him being partnered by champion jockey Tony McCoy, which countered the negatives of the horse being a seven-year-old and French-bred(no horse of his age or nationality had won the race for over 40 years). He was travelling well, at the rear of a leading group of 12 runners when he fell heavily and fatally at Becher's Brook on the second circuit.

Other popular fancies in the market were 1998 Scottish National winner Baronet, 1997 and 1998 Grand National runner-up Suny Bay, 1996 Sun Alliance Chase winner Nahthen Lad, 1998 Grand National winner Earth Summit, and the Peter Marsh Chase winner General Wolfe.

The six riders making their debut in the race all predictably found themselves as outsiders. Brian Harding fared best, finishing fifth, while Barry Fenton, Garrett Cotter and Steve Wynne, the latter in his only attempt at the National, also completed the course. Robert Widger failed to get round as he attempted to emulate his great-uncle who rode the winner in 1895, while Adie Smith also failed to complete.

== Finishing order ==
Position	Name	Jockey	Age	Weight (st, lb)	Starting price	Distance
1st	Bobbyjo	Paul Carberry	9	10-00	10/1	Won by 10 lengths
2nd	Blue Charm	Lorcan Wyer	9	10-00	25/1	A neck
3rd	Call It A Day	Richard Dunwoody	9	10-02	7/1	7 lengths
4th	Addington Boy	Adrian Maguire	11	10-07	10/1	5 lengths
5th	Feels Like Gold	Brian Harding	11	10-00	50/1	14 lengths
6th	Brave Highlander (IRE)	Philip Hide	11	10-01	50/1	18 lengths
7th	Kendall Cavalier	Barry Fenton	9	10-03	28/1	A head
8th	Earth Summit	Carl Llewellyn	11	11-00	16/1	Short head
9th	St. Mellion Fairway (IRE)	Jimmy Frost	10	10-02	200/1	14 lengths
10th	Samlee (IRE)	Rod Farrant	10	10-00	50/1	2 lengths
11th	Nahthen Lad (IRE)	Andrew Thornton	10	10-02	14/1	A distance
12th	General Wolfe	Norman Williamson	10	11-01	18/1	1¼ lengths
13th	Suny Bay (IRE)	Graham Bradley	10	11-13	12/1	5 lengths
14th	Back Bar	Dean Gallagher	11	10-00	200/1	1¼ lengths
15th	Strong Chairman	Robert Thornton	8	10-00	50/1	¾ lengths
16th	Merry People	Garrett Cotter	11	10-00	200/1	4 lengths (remounted)
17th	Avro Anson	Tony Dobbin	11	10-00	40/1	24 lengths
18th	Coome Hill	Stephen Wynne	10	10-11	25/1	Last to complete

== Non-finishers ==
Fence	Name	Jockey	Age	Weight (st, lb)	Starting price	Fate
1st	Double Thriller	Joe Tizzard	9	10-08	7/1	Fell
4th	Baronet	Richard Johnson	9	10-02	12/1	Fell
6th (Becher's Brook)	Mudahim	Brendan Powell	13	10-00	100/1	Unseated rider
6th (Becher's Brook)	Tamarindo	Timmy Murphy	6	10-04	66/1	Fell
15th (The Chair)	Cavelero	Sean Curran	10	10-00	50/1	Pulled up
18th	Commercial Artist	Tom Jenks	13	10-02	200/1	Tailed off, pulled up
19th	Cyborgo	Conor O'Dwyer	9	10-11	50/1	Tailed off, pulled up
22nd (Becher's Brook)	Fiddling The Facts	Mick Fitzgerald	8	10-03	6/1 F	Fell
22nd (Becher's Brook)	Eudipe	Tony McCoy	7	10-10	10/1	Fell (fatally)
22nd (Becher's Brook)	Frazer Island	Richard Guest	10	10-02	200/1	Fell
22nd (Becher's Brook)	Camelot Knight	Chris Maude	13	10-00	200/1	Brought down
22nd (Becher's Brook)	Choisty (IRE)	Mr. Robert Widger	9	10-00	200/1	Hampered, unseated
25th	Castle Coin	Adie Smith	7	10-00	200/1	Tailed off, hampered, unseated
27th	Bell's Life	Glenn Tormey	10	10-00	66/1	Tailed off, pulled up

== Media coverage and aftermath ==
The BBC retained the rights to broadcast the entire meeting live on BBC One for the 40th consecutive year, culminating with a Grandstand Grand National special on the Saturday, hosted for the final time by Des Lynam, who moved to rival broadcaster ITV later that year. Viewing figures showed that 10.1 million people watched the programme at 3.45pm.

The commentary team for the second consecutive year consisted of John Hanmer, Tony O'Hehir and lead commentator Jim McGrath the latter of whom was calling home the winner for the second time.

Racing UK broadcast the race into betting shops and sports social clubs across the country with commentary taken from the racecourse itself. Graham Goode called the winner home.

Television pictures were broadcast from fixed cameras situated at Becher's Brook, the Canal Turn, Anchor Bridge crossing and the grandstand, as well as a tracking cam fixed to the roof of a car travelling alongside the runners. Additional cameras also covered the race from a helicopter, inside fences and from the perspective of the riders through cameras in the caps of Brian Harding and Stephen Wynne. These additional pictures were not used in the original broadcast of the race but were used during a detailed replay of the race where Richard Pitman, Peter Scudamore and Jamie Osborne talked viewers through the race.

Winning jockey Paul Carberry said after the race: "I thought he had a good chance when the ground dried up. I got a good start and was handy the whole way. I was able to get a breather into him whenever I wanted. He jumped very well and I sat as long as I could. Going towards the second-last Adrian [Maguire, on Addington Boy] came in a bit, so I switched to the outside. I knew he would quicken and quicken. I got a great jump at the last, and from the elbow I didn't look back. I knew that he would keep going and nothing would get to him. It's a great feeling, but it'll take a while to sink in."

Second-placed jockey Lorcan Wyer said: "Down at the start he [Blue Charm] was whipping round a bit, and I thought we might even fall at the first. He gave me a tremendous ride but didn't quite see it out at the end."

Tony McCoy suffered bruised ribs during the race but none of the riders required hospital treatment.
