= Michael O'Hehir =

Irish sports commentator (1920–1996)

- Born: Michael James Hehir; 2 June 1920; Glasnevin, Dublin, Ireland
- Died: 24 November 1996 (aged 76); Dublin, Ireland
- Other names: Mícheál Ó hEithir
- Education: St. Patrick's National School, O'Connell CBS
- Alma mater: University College Dublin
- Occupations: Sports commentator, journalist
- Years active: 1938–1985
- Employer: Raidió Teilifís Éireann
- Spouse: Molly Owens (1948–1996)
- Children: Tony O'Hehir, Mary O'Hehir, Mike O'Hehir, Peter O'Hehir, Ann O'Hehir

Michael James Hehir (also known as Michael O'Hehir and Irish: Mícheál Ó hEithir; 2 June 1920 – 24 November 1996) was an Irish Gaelic games and horse racing commentator and journalist. Between 1938 and 1985 his enthusiasm and memorable turn of phrase endeared him to many. He is still regarded as the original "voice of Gaelic games". O'Hehir was in the commentary box for the 1967 Grand National and recounted the carnage at the 23rd fence.

== Early life ==
O'Hehir was born in Glasnevin, Dublin, to parents who had moved from County Clare. His father, Jim O'Hehir, was active in Gaelic games, having trained his native county to win the 1914 All-Ireland title in hurling. He subsequently trained the Leitrim football team that secured the Connacht title in 1927 and he also served as an official with the Dublin Junior Board.

O'Hehir was educated at St Patrick's National School in Drumcondra before later attending the O'Connell School. He later studied electrical engineering at University College Dublin, but he abandoned his studies after just one year to pursue a full-time career in broadcasting.

O'Hehir never played football, but he enjoyed a distinguished hurling career with the St Vincents GAA club in Raheny.

== Broadcasting career ==
=== Early career ===
O'Hehir became fascinated with the radio when he received a present of one as a child. He had just turned eighteen and was still a schoolboy when he wrote to Radio Éireann asking to do a test commentary. He was accepted and was asked, along with five others, to do a five-minute microphone test for a National Football League game between Wexford and Louth. His microphone test impressed the director of broadcasting so much that he was invited to commentate on the whole of the second half of the match.

Two months later in August 1938, O'Hehir made his first broadcast – the All-Ireland football semi-final between Monaghan and Galway. He went on to commentate on the second semi-final and that year's final between Galway and Kerry. The following year he covered his first hurling final – the famous "thunder and lightning final" between Cork and Kilkenny.

Sports broadcasting in Ireland was still in its infancy at this stage; however, O'Hehir's Sunday afternoon commentaries quickly became greatly popular with many rural listeners.

=== The Polo Grounds Final ===
By the mid-1940s, O'Hehir was recognised as one of Ireland's leading sports broadcasters. In 1947, he faced his most challenging broadcast to date when he had to commentate on the All-Ireland Football Final from the Polo Grounds in New York City. More than a million people were listening to the broadcast back in Ireland and O'Hehir was the one link between the game in New York and the fans in Ireland. The broadcast had to be finished by five o'clock local time, but the match ran late. The last few minutes of O'Hehir's commentary included him pleading with the broadcast technicians not to take him off the air. His pleas were successful and the Irish people could listen to the game in full.

=== Horse racing ===
In 1944, O'Hehir joined the staff of Independent Newspapers as a sports sub-editor, before beginning a seventeen-year career as a racing correspondent in 1947. His racing expertise was not just limited to print journalism as he became a racing commentator with Radio Éireann in 1945.

Even though O'Hehir's star was on the rise with the national broadcaster in Ireland, he applied to the BBC for a position as a racing commentator. His application was accepted and he provided commentary for the Cheltenham Gold Cup. The BBC bosses were sufficiently impressed with O'Hehir to offer him further commentaries.

Rutherfords has been hampered, and so has Castle Falls; Rondetto has fallen, Princeful has fallen, Norther has fallen, Kirtle Lad has fallen, The Fossa has fallen, there's a right pile-up... Leedsy has climbed over the fence and left his jockey there. And now, with all this mayhem, Foinavon has gone off on his own! He's about 50, 100 yards in front of everything else

— O'Hehir describes the chaotic scene at the 23rd fence in the 1967 Grand National

O'Hehir subsequently became a staple of the BBC's coverage of the famous annual Grand National steeplechase. He would invariably pick up the commentary at the Becher's Brook fence and take the race to Valentine's Brook, a vital section of the race where many a favourite fell. Foinavon's famous victory in 1967 is remembered as one of O'Hehir's finest moments in racing commentaries and won him great respect for the speed and smoothness with which he picked out the unconsidered outsider. O'Hehir later confessed in an interview that it had been his inability to identify the colours on his card when inspecting the riders' silks in the weighing room prior to the race that had led him to question rider John Buckingham who his mount was. Buckingham advised O'Hehir that Foinavon's silks had been changed at the last minute as his regular green colours were considered unlucky. It was because of this chance meeting that he was able to identify the 100/1 outsider and carry the commentary.

However, in the 1969 Grand National, O'Hehir made a horrendous error stating that eventual winner Highland Wedding had fallen at Bechers Brook (2nd circuit) when a horse called Kilburn fell. He only covered three TV Grand Nationals (1967, 1968 and 1969), afterwards he would continue to cover the race for BBC Radio until 1981.

In addition to horseracing, O'Hehir also covered showjumping, including the Dublin Horse Show at the RDS in Ballsbridge.

=== Head of Sport ===
In 1961 Ireland's first national television station, Telefís Éireann, was founded and O'Hehir was appointed head of sports programmes. As a result of his influence, O'Hehir secured the broadcasting rights to the closing stages of the All-Ireland hurling and football championships for the new station. As well as his new role O'Hehir continued to keep up a hectic schedule of commentaries.

=== Current affairs broadcasting ===
O'Hehir's skills did not just confine him to sports broadcasting, in November 1963, he faced his toughest broadcast. By coincidence, he was on holiday with his wife Molly in New York City when US President John F. Kennedy was assassinated. O'Hehir was asked by Telefís Éireann to provide the commentary for the funeral. The live five-hour broadcast proved a huge challenge for him, as he had had no association with political or current affairs broadcasting up to that point and lacked the resources available to more established television stations. O'Hehir's commentary, however, won widespread acclaim in Ireland and showed a different side of his nature. He later described it as the most moving and most demanding commentary of his career. O'Hehir was known in the United States prior to this as he had worked with ABC as a racing commentator. His presentation of the Kennedy funeral brought offers from American broadcasters, however, he preferred to remain in Ireland.

O'Hehir later provided commentaries for other non-sporting events such as the reburial of Roger Casement (who had been executed in 1916) in 1965 and the celebrations marking the golden jubilee of the Easter Rising in 1966.

=== Later career ===
In the early 1970s, the initial challenge of being head of sport had faded as Telefís Éireann was now an established broadcaster. In 1972, he became manager of the newly designed Leopardstown Racecourse but left the following year to continue writing and broadcasting as a freelance journalist. This work took him to America where he commentated for NBC in races such as the Arlington Million. This association with the American broadcaster lasted well into the eighties.

In 1975 O'Hehir was honoured by The Late Late Show with a special tribute show. In the 1984 People of the Year Awards he was one of the winners.

In his commentary O'Hehir aimed at impartiality, but admitted that he was always blamed for being "against the losers". Similarly, he was also blamed for making a game out of nothing. Shortly after Dublin defeated Galway in 1983 in a tense All-Ireland final, about thirty Dublin supporters attacked him in the commentary box when he was commentating at another match in Navan. Only the presence of an armed detective – there to protect the microphone – saved him from serious injury.

=== Illness and later life ===
In August 1985 O'Hehir was preparing to commentate on the All-Ireland hurling final between Offaly and Galway. It would be a special occasion as it would mark his 100th commentary on an All-Ireland final. Two weeks before the game he suffered a stroke which left him using a wheelchair and with some speaking difficulties. This illness denied him the chance to reach the century milestone.

O'Hehir was subsequently replaced by Ger Canning on television, and on radio by Mícheál Ó Muircheartaigh. He had hoped to return to broadcasting one day to complete his 100th final; however, this never happened.

In 1987 the centenary All-Ireland football final took place and a special series of events were planned on the day at Croke Park. There was a parade of the 1947 Polo Grounds finalists; however, the biggest cheer of the day was reserved for O'Hehir who was pushed onto the field in a wheelchair by his son Peter. Nobody expected the standing ovation and the massive outpouring of emotion from the thousands of fans present and from O'Hehir himself.

Over the next few years, O'Hehir withdrew from public life. He returned briefly in 1996 when his autobiography, My Life and Times, was published.

== Death ==
Michael O'Hehir died in Dublin on 24 November 1996.

== Quotes ==
"And if there's anybody along the way there listening in, just give us five minutes more" – O'Hehir saving the 1947 Polo Grounds Final for all the Irish listeners

"Ring in front of the goal is going through. He steadies himself, he takes a shot. It's blocked by Art Foley and it's cleared out by Art Foley. Oh, what a magnificent save there by Art Foley" – O'Hehir's description of Art Foley's famous save in the final moments of the 1956 hurling final

"And Tom Cheasty breaks through with Kilkenny defenders falling around him like dying wasps" – during one of the Kilkenny – Waterford games of the late 1950s or early 1960s

"And it looks like there’s a bit of a schemozzle in the parallelogram" – O'Hehir's ubiquitous euphemism for a fight

"The greatest freak of all time" – after Mikey Sheehy lobs the ball into the goal while Dublin goalkeeper, Paddy Cullen is arguing with the referee

"And it looks as if they were winning the way the Offaly men are just dithering and dawdling there...and here they come. This is Liam Connor the full-back...a high, lobbing, dropping ball in towards the goalmouth...a shot and a GOAL, a GOAL, a GOAL FOR OFFALY! There was a goal in the game! A goal. Oh, what a goal!" – O'Hehir's reaction as Séamus Darby scores the winning goal for Offaly in the 1982 All-Ireland Senior Football Championship Final, denying Kerry a famous fifth consecutive All-Ireland title.

"And the bare-footed wonder with the ball now" – O'Hehir's description of Babs Keating who played some of the 1971 All-Ireland Hurling Final in his bare feet.

"And there he is, Alan Lotty. He may be bootless, he may be sockless, he may be stickless, but he is certainly not ball-less." – O'Hehir's unusual description of Cork's Alan Lotty after he discarded his boots and socks and lost his hurley in a collision with another player.

"And it is a penalty. And Paddy Cullen, heaven help him, in there in the goal" – during the 1974 all-Ireland football final.

"And the Jacks are back alright and the way they're playing right now the Galway backs are jacked!"

== See also ==
- List of people on the postage stamps of Ireland
