= Kieran Kelly (jockey) =

Irish jockey

Kieran Kelly (25 June 1978 – 12 August 2003) was an Irish jump jockey who died as a result of a racing accident.

Kelly was born in County Kildare and achieved his first Cheltenham Festival success in March 2003 on Hardy Eustace in the Royal & SunAlliance Novices' Hurdle.

He was critically injured in a fall in on 8 August 2003 at Kilbeggan racecourse and remained on life support in Beaumont Hospital in north Dublin. He died four days later at the age of 25.
