= Foinavon =

Irish-bred Thoroughbred racehorse

- Sire: Vulgan
- Grandsire: Sirlan
- Dam: Ecilace
- Damsire: Interlace
- Sex: Gelding
- Foaled: 1958
- Country: Ireland
- Colour: Black
- Breeder: Timothy Ryan
- Owner: 1) Anne, Duchess of Westminster; 2) Cyril Watkins

Major wins
- Grand National (1967)
- Last updated on 19 January 2008

Foinavon (1958–1971) was an Irish racehorse. He won the Grand National in 1967 at odds of 100/1 after the rest of the field fell, refused or were hampered or brought down in a mêlée at the 23rd fence. The fence was officially named after Foinavon in 1984.

He was at one point owned by Anne Grosvenor, Duchess of Westminster, whose colours were also carried by Arkle. Both horses were named after Scottish mountains.

== Early life and career ==
Foinavon’s sire was the French-bred Vulgan who was based at Blackrath Farm in County Kildare, Ireland. Vulgan was a leading National Hunt sire, producing winners of the Champion Hurdle, Cheltenham Gold Cup and three Grand Nationals. Foinavon’s dam was Ecilace, a nineteen-year-old broodmare who had never raced but had already foaled Umm, the winner of the 1955 Irish Grand National. She was owned by a dairy farmer in County Limerick who paid 47 guineas to have her covered by Vulgan. Foinavon was foaled in 1958 and spent the first year and a half of his life on the farm.

In September 1959 he was sold in Dublin for 400 guineas and, eight months later, sold on to Anne, Duchess of Westminster. His new home was a farm near Dublin belonging to the duchess. He spent more than a year there before being sent to Tom Dreaper’s yard at Greenogue, where a stable-mate was Arkle. The Duchess of Westminster gave Foinavon his name before his first race in 1962, the name being, like those of Arkle and Ben Stack, the name of a mountain on her Sutherland estate. Foinavon’s first race was a bumper in which he finished unplaced. His first race over hurdles was at Cheltenham on 16 November 1962 when, ridden by Pat Taaffe, he came third in the Cowley Novices Hurdle. He was then unplaced in several more hurdle races that season. The following season he started to race over fences, gaining his first victory at Naas on 29 February 1964.

In 1965 Foinavon was up for sale again. He was bought for 2,000 guineas by John Kempton, who ran Chatham Stables, a small training yard in Compton, Berkshire, and had owners looking for a horse to run in the Grand National. His new owners were Cyril and Iris Watkins and Mac Bennelick, and he had a new stable companion in the form of a white goat called Susie. In April 1966, after some disappointing results, he was back at Cheltenham, contesting the Sunday Express Handicap Chase in a bitless bridle and ridden for the first time by John Buckingham. He came sixth in a field of seven. But the following season, 1966–1967, he had a run of better performances, being placed in seven out of eight starts. These included a fourth place in the King George VI Chase at Kempton on Boxing Day 1966, his former stable companion Arkle’s last race. In the 1967 Cheltenham Gold Cup he was ridden by trainer John Kempton and finished unplaced.

== 1967 Grand National ==
Trainer John Kempton had been hoping to ride Foinavon in the 1967 Grand National himself but, at over six foot, he couldn’t make the weight and began looking for a lighter jockey. Since owner Cyril Watkins wasn't prepared to pay the usual additional fee for riding in a Grand National, the ride was turned down by three jockeys. It was only three days before the race that the trainer finally found a jockey for Foinavon – John Buckingham, who had never ridden in the Grand National before.

Foinavon started the Grand National at odds of 100/1. Neither his trainer nor his owner were at Aintree, John Kempton having gone to Worcester to ride another of his horses.

Of the 44 starters, 28 were still in the race as they approached Becher's Brook on the second circuit, with Foinavon going well in 22nd place, just behind the favourite Honey End. Leading the field were two riderless horses, Popham Down and April Rose. As they approached the 23rd fence Popham Down veered to his right and ran across the fence, causing a pile up. Rondetto, one of the leaders, managed to clear the fence but then unseated his rider after landing. As horses refused, crashed into each other and ran up and down the fence, Foinavon slowed to a canter, managed to find a gap, clear the fence and carry on.

At the next obstacle, the Canal Turn, Buckingham looked back in disbelief at the 30-length lead he held with just six fences remaining. Seventeen horses, including remounted ones, gave chase, and 15/2 favourite Honey End closed the gap to within 20 lengths by the final fence, but Foinavon was able to maintain this lead over the run-in. Red Alligator, who went on to win in 1968, was a distant third.

BBC commentator Peter O'Sullevan remarked on "a really enterprising piece of jockeyship by young John Buckingham". In the winner's enclosure former jockey Tim Brookshaw put the winner's blue sash on Foinavon's neck. Buckingham was interviewed: "Everything seemed to stop in front of me. I managed to pull onto the outside. I nearly got stopped by two loose horses... after he jumped it, we were just on our own. I couldn’t believe it. It was wonderful." As neither Foinavon's trainer nor owner were at the racecourse, his trainer's father stepped into the winner's enclosure.

Two days later, a report in The Times newspaper described how the race "degenerated into farce":

Out of the battlefield emerged one survivor, Foinavon – now the leader by at least a fence. He had been many lengths behind but somehow, at his own sedate pace, managed to fiddle his way through . . . Later, describing his victory, the successful rider, John Buckingham, said that after jumping the Canal Turn he presumed that he was in the lead because he could see no one ahead. Two fences later he took a peep over his shoulder and saw no one behind either! . . . The race degenerated into farce. Foinavon plodded home, pursued by the favourite, Honey End . . .

A reader of The Times responded by pointing out that, in spite of being held up at the 23rd fence, Foinavon's time was three seconds faster than that of Anglo the previous year, and also faster than the times of three other recent winners of the race.

Seventeen days after winning at Aintree, Foinavon, Susie the goat, and John Buckingham were invited to a charity reception at St James's Palace in London hosted by the Duchess of Kent. There were other charity events and Foinavon and jockey featured in the 1968 Schweppes racing calendar.

The incident at the 23rd fence is frequently replayed on Grand National day. The commentary of Michael O'Hehir, who quickly recognised the horse who came through the mêlée as Foinavon, has also been widely reported on. O'Hehir later said in an interview that it was precisely the unfamiliarity of Foinavon's colours that made him so instantly recognisable during the race. O'Hehir visited the weighing room before the race, as is the custom of many National commentators, to familiarise himself more clearly with the colours of the silks. He could not identify the black with red and yellow braces being worn by John Buckingham, and had to ask him who his mount was. Buckingham was riding Foinavon, which was shown on the race card as two-tone green quarters, as worn by the rider in the Cheltenham Gold Cup a few weeks earlier, but Buckingham explained that the owner felt green to be unlucky and so had registered new colours for the National.

After the race, O'Hehir suggested that, as with obstacles like Becher's Brook and Valentine's Brook, the 23rd might one day be named after Foinavon. In 1984, the Aintree executive officially named the 7th/23rd fence (the smallest on the course at 4 ft 6 in) the Foinavon fence.

== Later life ==
Foinavon defended his title in the 1968 Grand National but was brought down at the 16th fence, the water jump. His jockey that year was Phil Harvey; Buckingham had a broken arm.

Foinavon had not been placed in the first three in any of his seven races in the 1967/1968 season and it was not until September 1968 that he would win another race, the John Lumley Handicap Chase at Exeter Racecourse, ridden again by John Buckingham. The following month the pair won a race at Uttoxeter after the rest of the field of six had fallen or been brought down. Foinavon's last race came in February 1969 at Kempton, when, ridden by Buckingham, he fell at the water jump. John Buckingham said: "I felt the horse wasn’t enjoying himself at all – it was obvious. I told them I didn’t want to ride him any more. I think the horse had had enough". Foinavon spent two years of retirement at Chatham Stables before succumbing to colic in 1971.

== Grand National record ==
Grand National	Position	Jockey	Age	Weight	SP	Distance
1967	1st	John Buckingham	9	10–0	100/1	Won by 15 lengths
1968	DNF	Phil Harvey	10	10–5	66/1	Brought down at fence 16
