= Red Marauder =

British racehorse

- Sire: Gunner B
- Grandsire: Royal Gunner
- Dam: Cover Your Money
- Damsire: Precipice Wood
- Sex: Gelding
- Foaled: 4 March 1990
- Died: 22 November 2016
- Country: Chestnut
- Colour: United Kingdom
- Breeder: Mrs D Jenks
- Owner: Norman Mason
- Trainer: Norman Mason
- Record: 21: 9-3-1
- Earnings: £392,206

Honours
- First National Bank Gold Cup (1998); Grand National (2001)
- Last updated on 16 April 2012

Red Marauder (4 March 1990 – 22 November 2016) was a race horse that won the 2001 Grand National at 33/1. Only four horses completed the race successfully – two of those having been remounted – due partly to the desperate conditions at Aintree and mainly thanks to the loose horse Paddy's Return causing mayhem at the Canal Turn.

Red Marauder and Smarty had the race to themselves for much of the second circuit before the former surged clear of his tired rival from two out to record a distance victory. It was the slowest time recorded for a Grand National for one hundred and eighteen years.

The Grand National win was a first for Sunderland-based horse owner Norman Mason who had entered Red Marauder in the previous year's race where he fell.

Trainer Richard Guest was also the jockey that day and was in possession of the retired horse until the latter's death at the age of 26 on 22 November 2016.

== Pedigree ==
Pedigree of Red Marauder (IRE), chestnut gelding, 1990
Sire Gunner B (GB) 1973	Royal Gunner (USA); 1962	Royal Charger	Nearco
Sire Gunner B (GB) 1973	Royal Gunner (USA); 1962	Royal Charger	Sun Princess
Sire Gunner B (GB) 1973	Royal Gunner (USA); 1962	Levee	Hill Prince
Sire Gunner B (GB) 1973	Royal Gunner (USA); 1962	Levee	Bourtai
Sire Gunner B (GB) 1973	Sweet Councillor (GB); 1968	Privy Councillor	Counsel
Sire Gunner B (GB) 1973	Sweet Councillor (GB); 1968	Privy Councillor	High Number
Sire Gunner B (GB) 1973	Sweet Councillor (GB); 1968	Sugarstick	Zucchero
Sire Gunner B (GB) 1973	Sweet Councillor (GB); 1968	Sugarstick	York Gala
Dam Cover Your Money (GB) 1974	Precipice Wood (GB); 1966	Lauso	Ocarina
Dam Cover Your Money (GB) 1974	Precipice Wood (GB); 1966	Lauso	La Canea
Dam Cover Your Money (GB) 1974	Precipice Wood (GB); 1966	Grecian Garden	Kingstone
Dam Cover Your Money (GB) 1974	Precipice Wood (GB); 1966	Grecian Garden	Academia
Dam Cover Your Money (GB) 1974	Lira (GB); 1958	Souverain	Maravedis
Dam Cover Your Money (GB) 1974	Lira (GB); 1958	Souverain	Jolie Reine
Dam Cover Your Money (GB) 1974	Lira (GB); 1958	Tiberina	Tiberius
Dam Cover Your Money (GB) 1974	Lira (GB); 1958	Tiberina	Drumrora (Family:B-20)
