= Privy Councillor (horse) =

British-bred Thoroughbred racehorse

- Sire: Counsel
- Grandsire: Court Martial
- Dam: High Number
- Damsire: His Highness
- Sex: Stallion
- Foaled: 1959
- Country: United Kingdom
- Colour: Chestnut
- Breeder: Gerald Glover
- Owner: Gerald Glover
- Trainer: Tom Waugh
- Record: 11:5-x-x
- Earnings: £34,852

Major wins
- Free Handicap (1962); 2000 Guineas (1962)

Awards
- Timeform rating 125

Privy Councillor (1959 – October 1977) was a British Thoroughbred racehorse and sire, best known for winning the classic 2000 Guineas in 1962. After winning three minor races as a two-year-old he went on to win the Free Handicap in the spring of 1962 before recording an upset win in the Guineas. He never won again and made little impact as a breeding stallion.

== Background ==
Privy Councillor was a chestnut horse, bred by his owner Gerald Glover at his Pytchley House stud in Northamptonshire. He was sired by Counsel, the winner of the 1955 Greenham Stakes and two edition of the Rose of York Stakes. Privy Councillor's dam High Number was bought by Glover as a foal for 750 guineas and showed modest ability on the track, winning two minor races as a four-year-old. She was the first mare to be covered by Counsel when the stallion began his stud career in 1958. High Number was a granddaughter of the broodmare Thirteen, whose other descendants have included Oasis Dream and Beat Hollow.

The colt was sent into training with Thomas Algernon "Tom" Waugh at the Wroughton House stable in Newmarket

== Racing career ==
=== 1961: two-year-old season ===
As a two-year-old in 1961, Privy Councillor won minor races at Leicester, Birmingham and Warwick Racecourse, but appeared to be some way below top class.

=== 1962: three-year-old season ===
In April 1962 Privy Councillor carried a weight of 116 pounds in the Free Handicap over seven furlongs at Newmarket Racecourse. He moved into fringe contention for the British Classic Races as he won from Miletus and the filly Tournella.

At the next Newmarket meeting on 2 May, Privy Councillor started at odds of 100/6 in a nineteen-runner field for the 154th running of the 2000 Guineas over the Rowley mile. He won by three lengths from the Charles Engelhard-owned Romulus with Prince Poppa two lengths away in third. The winner's prize of £32,839 was the biggest in the history of the race.

Privy Councillor was beaten in his remaining races and was retired from racing at the end of his three-year-old season.

== Assessment ==
The independent Timeform organisation awarded Privy Councillor a rating of 125 in 1962, nine pounds below their top-rated three-year-olds Hethersett and Arctic Storm.

In their book A Century of Champions, based on a modified version of the Timeform system, John Randall and Tony Morris rated Privy Councillor an "inferior" winner of the 2000 Guineas.

== Stud record ==
Rockavon was retired from racing to become a breeding stallion. He made little impact in Europe and in 1969 he was sold exported to Japan. His last reported foals were born in 1973. The best of his offspring was probably Privy Seal, who finished third in the 1969 Champion Hurdle. He died in Japan in October 1977.

== Pedigree ==
Pedigree of Privy Councillor (GB), chestnut stallion, 1959
| Sire Counsel (GB) 1952 | Court Martial (GB); 1942 | Fair Trial | Fairway |
| Sire Counsel (GB) 1952 | Court Martial (GB); 1942 | Fair Trial | Lady Juror |
| Sire Counsel (GB) 1952 | Court Martial (GB); 1942 | Intantaneous | Hurry On |
| Sire Counsel (GB) 1952 | Court Martial (GB); 1942 | Intantaneous | Pictire |
| Sire Counsel (GB) 1952 | Wheedler (GB); 1943 | Umidwar | Blandford |
| Sire Counsel (GB) 1952 | Wheedler (GB); 1943 | Umidwar | Uganda |
| Sire Counsel (GB) 1952 | Wheedler (GB); 1943 | Miss Minx | Mr Jinks |
| Sire Counsel (GB) 1952 | Wheedler (GB); 1943 | Miss Minx | Gerard's Cross |
| Dam High Number (GB) 1947 | His Highness (GB); 1936 | Hyperion | Gainsborough |
| Dam High Number (GB) 1947 | His Highness (GB); 1936 | Hyperion | Selene |
| Dam High Number (GB) 1947 | His Highness (GB); 1936 | Moti Ranee | Spion Kop |
| Dam High Number (GB) 1947 | His Highness (GB); 1936 | Moti Ranee | Moti Mahal |
| Dam High Number (GB) 1947 | Lady Luck (GB); 1941 | Fairway | Phalaris |
| Dam High Number (GB) 1947 | Lady Luck (GB); 1941 | Fairway | Scapa Flow |
| Dam High Number (GB) 1947 | Lady Luck (GB); 1941 | Thirteen | Bulger |
| Dam High Number (GB) 1947 | Lady Luck (GB); 1941 | Thirteen | Credenda (Family 19) |

- Privy Councillor was inbred 3 × 4 to Fairway, meaning that this stallion appears in both the third and fourth generations of his pedigree.
