= Bristol Novices' Hurdle =

Hurdle horse race in Britain

Bristol Novices' Hurdle
2025
| Carlenrig | They Call Me Hugo | Conman John |

Previous years
2024
Jet Blue | Western Knight | Yellow Car
2021
Blazing Khal | Gelino Bello | Ballygrifincottage
2020
Make Good | Pats Fancy | Ask A Honey Bee
2019
Redford Road | Champagne Well | Kiltealy Briggs
2018
Rockpoint | Lisnagar Oscar | Rocco
2017
Kilbricken Storm | Count Meribel | Equus Secretus
2016
Wholestone | Ami Desbois | No Hassle Hoff
2015
Unowhatimeanharry | Final Nudge | West Approach
2014
Blaklion | Anteros | Port Melon
2013
Kings Palace | Masters Hill | Potters Cross
2012
Coneygree | Aerial | Midnight Appeal
2011
Deireadh Re | Rev It Up | American Spin

2010-2001
2010
Mossley | Join Together | Teaforthree
2009
Tell Massini | Kennel Hill | Mon Mome
2007
Nenuphar Collonges | Gone To Lunch | Souffleur
2006
Flight Leader | Labelthou | The Whisperer
2005
Black Jack Ketchum | Gungadu | Amicelli
2004
Brewster | Jackson | Football Crazy
2003
Comply Or Die | Phar From Frosty | Champagne Harry
2002
Iris's Gift | Ad Hoc | Priests Bridge
2001
Ballycassidy | See You Sometime | Only two ran

2000-1994
2000
Garruth | Gola Cher | Sheer Genius
1999
Bindaree | No Tale To Tell | Better Think Again
1998
Bosuns Mate | Irish Banker | Radiation
1997
Lord Jim | Promalee | Easy Feelin
1996
Tarrs Bridge | Southern Nights | Carole's Crusader
1994
Billygoat Gruff | Morgans Harbour | Garrylough

The Bristol Novices' Hurdle is a Grade 2 National Hunt hurdle race in Great Britain which is open to horses aged four years or older. It is run on the New Course at Cheltenham over a distance of about 3 miles (2 miles 7 furlongs and 213 yards, or 4,822 metres), and during its running there are twelve hurdles to be jumped. The race is for novice hurdlers, and it is scheduled to take place each year in December.

Originally run over 3 miles, the distance was reduced to 2 miles 4 furlongs from 1979. The event was extended from 2 miles and 4½ furlongs to its present distance in 1994, and at the same time it was given Grade 2 status. It has been sponsored by the vegetable growing company Albert Bartlett since 2007.

== Winners since 1970 ==
- Separate divisions of the race indicated by (1) and (2).

| Year | Winner | Age | Jockey | Trainer |
|---|---|---|---|---|
| 1970 (1) | Notification | 5 | Ken White | Fred Rimell |
| 1970 (2) | French Wood | 5 | Gerry Scott | Neville Crump |
| 1971 (1) | Vulgan's Fire | 5 | Terry Biddlecombe | Fred Rimell |
| 1971 (2) | Daniel Boon | 5 | Eddie Harty | Richard Head |
| 1972 (1) | Some Hazard | 7 | Thomas Geraint Davies | Roddy Armytage |
| 1972 (2) | Bourdon | 5 | John Haine | Dave Hanley |
| 1973 (1) | Star Beauty | 5 | Richard Floyd | Ian Dudgeon |
| 1973 (2) | Our Edition | 6 | Richard Pitman | Stan Mellor |
| 1974 (1) | Tom Dooley | 6 | Jimmy Fox | Toby Balding |
| 1974 (2) | Night School | 5 | Richard Pitman | Fred Winter |
| 1975 (1) | Son And Heir | 5 | Barry Brogan | John Edwards |
| 1975 (2) | Posh Saree | 5 | Nigel Wakley | Derek Ancil |
| 1976 | Abandoned due to frost |
| 1977 (1) | Mauritius | 5 | John Francome | Fred Winter |
| 1977 (2) | Isotip | 5 | John Francome | Richard Head |
| 1978 (1) | Chumson | 7 | John Francome | Fred Winter |
| 1978 (2) (dh) | Caper's Lad; Prince's Risk | 6; 4 | Mr N Mitchell; Robert Hughes | Mrs E Mitchell; Philip Mitchell |
| 1979 (1) | Random Leg | 4 | Richard Rowe | Josh Gifford |
| 1979 (2) | Miners Lodge | 6 | Jeff Pearce | Ted Fisher |
| 1980 (1) | Royal Bowman | 5 | Sam Morshead | Fred Rimell |
| 1980 (2) | Brave Jack | 4 | Sam Morshead | Fred Rimell |
| 1981 | Abandoned due to snow |
| 1982 (1) | Malford Lad | 4 | Mark Richards | R Hawker |
| 1982 (2) | Sommelier | 4 | Anthony Webber | A Wates |
| 1983 (1) | Baz Bombati | 5 | J Nolan | Stan Mellor |
| 1983 (2) | Floating Lover | 4 | Brendan Powell | N R Mitchell |
| 1984 (1) | Meister | 4 | P Murphy | Jim Old |
| 1984 (2) | Lonach | 6 | Richard Linley | Toby Balding |
| 1985 (1) | Midnight Count | 5 | Richard Rowe | Josh Gifford |
| 1985 (2) | Ten Plus | 5 | Kevin Mooney | Fulke Walwyn |
| 1986 | Sunbeam Talbot | 5 | Mr Marcus Armytage | Roddy Armytage |
| 1987 | Abandoned due to frost |
| 1988 | Hawthorn Hill Lad | 4 | Mark Pitman | Jenny Pitman |
| 1989 | Remittance Man | 5 | Richard Dunwoody | Nicky Henderson |
| 1990 | Bignor Hill | 5 | Carl Llewellyn | Josh Gifford |
| | no race 1991–92 |
| 1993 | Book of Music | 5 | Declan Murphy | Josh Gifford |
| 1994 | Billygoat Gruff | 5 | Warren Marston | David Nicholson |
| 1995 | Abandoned due to frost |
| 1996 | Tarrs Bridge | 5 | Jamie Magee | Charlie Mann |
| 1997 | Lord Jim | 5 | Mick Fitzgerald | Jim Old |
| 1998 | Bosuns Mate | 5 | Carl Llewellyn | Nigel Twiston-Davies |
| 1999 | Bindaree | 5 | Carl Llewellyn | Nigel Twiston-Davies |
| 2000 | Garruth | 6 | Tony Dobbin | Tim Easterby |
| 2001 (Note: The "2001" running took place at Huntingdon in January 2002) | Ballycassidy | 6 | Robert Thornton | Alan King |
| 2002 | Iris's Gift | 5 | Tony McCoy | Jonjo O'Neill |
| 2003 | Comply or Die | 4 | Tony McCoy | Martin Pipe |
| 2004 | Brewster | 7 | David Dennis | Ian Williams |
| 2005 | Black Jack Ketchum | 6 | Tony McCoy | Jonjo O'Neill |
| 2006 | Flight Leader | 6 | Joe Tizzard | Colin Tizzard |
| 2007 | Nenuphar Collonges | 6 | Robert Thornton | Alan King |
| 2008 | Abandoned due to waterlogging |
| 2009 | Tell Massini | 5 | Paddy Brennan | Tom George |
| 2010 | Mossley | 4 | Barry Geraghty | Nicky Henderson |
| 2011 | Deireadh Re | 5 | Ruby Walsh | Paul Nicholls |
| 2012 | Coneygree | 5 | Mattie Batchelor | Mark Bradstock |
| 2013 | Kings Palace | 5 | Tom Scudamore | David Pipe |
| 2014 | Blaklion | 5 | Ryan Hatch | Nigel Twiston-Davies |
| 2015 | Unowhatimeanharry | 7 | Noel Fehily | Harry Fry |
| 2016 | Wholestone | 5 | Daryl Jacob | Nigel Twiston-Davies |
| 2017 | Kilbricken Storm | 6 | Harry Cobden | Colin Tizzard |
| 2018 | Rockpoint | 5 | Tom Scudamore | Colin Tizzard |
| 2019 | Redford Road | 5 | Jamie Bargary | Nigel Twiston-Davies |
| 2020 | Make Good | 5 | Richard Johnson | John McConnell |
| 2021 | Blazing Khal | 5 | Donal McInerney | Charles Byrnes |
| 2022 | Abandoned due to frost |
| 2023 | Shanagh Bob | 5 | Nico de Boinville | Nicky Henderson |
| 2024 | Jet Blue | 5 | James Reveley | David Cottin |
| 2025 | Calenrig | 5 | Harry Skelton | Dan Skelton |

== See also ==
- Horse racing in Great Britain
- List of British National Hunt races
