= Coral Trophy Handicap Chase =

Steeplechase horse race in Britain

Coral Trophy Handicap Chase
2026
Lookaway	The Doyen Chief	Kdeux Saint Fray

Previous years
2025
Katate Dori	Hyland	Our Power
2024
Forward Plan	Al Dancer	Bowtogreatness
2023
Our Power	Flegmatik	Frodon
2022
Cap Du Nord	Kitty's Light	Our Power
2021
Clondaw Castle	Erick Le Rouge	Mister Malarky

2020-2011
2020
Mister Malarky	Black Corton	Sametegal
2019
Walt	Double Shuffle	Adrien Du Pont
2018
Master Dee	Ballykan	Theatre Territory
2017
Pilgrims Bay	Double Shuffle	Theatre Guide
2016
Theatre Guide	Opening Batsman	Roc D'apsis
2015
Rocky Creek	Le Reve	Bally Legend
2014
Bally Legend	Bury Parade	Tour Des Champs
2013
Opening Batsman	Rolling Aces	Duke of Lucca
2012
Nacarat	Hector's Choice	Planet of Sound
2011
Quinz	Mount Oscar	Nacarat

2010-2001
2010
Razor Royale	Nacarat	Le Burf
2009
Nacarat	Possol	Big Fella Thanks
2008
Gungadu	Kelami	Le Volfoni
2007
Simon	Cornish Sett	Lacdoudal
2006
Innox	L'ami	My Will
2005
Farmer Jack	Iznogoud	Banker Count
2004
Marlborough	Gunther McBride	Iznogoud
2003
La Landiere	Gunther McBride	Ryalux
2002
Gunther McBride	Eau De Cologne	Mr Baxter Basics
2001
Young Spartacus	Commanche Court	Dark Stranger

2000-1991
2000
Gloria Victis	Marlborough	Bouchasson
1999
Dr Leunt	The Land Agent	Even Flow
1998
Super Tactics	Land Afar	Callisoe Bay
1997
Mudahim	King Lucifer	Percy Smollett
1996
Rough Quest	Percy Smollett	Egypt Mill Prince
1995
Val D'Alene	Southolt	Antonin
1994
Antonin	Docklands Express	The Fellow
1993
Zeta's Lad	Docklands Express	Bradbury Star
1992
Docklands Express	Pegwell Bay	Romany King
1991
Docklands Express	Cuddy Dale	Ballyhane

1990-1988
1990
Desert Orchid	Delius	Seagram
1989
Bonanza Boy	Gainsay	Ballyhane
1988
Rhyme 'N' Reason	Lean Ar Aghaidh	Mr Frisk

The Coral Trophy is a Premier Handicap National Hunt steeplechase in Great Britain which is open to horses aged five years or older. It is run at Kempton Park over a distance of about 3 miles (4,828 metres), and during its running there are eighteen fences to be jumped. It is a handicap race, and it is scheduled to take place each year in late February.

The race was first run in 1949, but in 1988 it was rebranded as the Racing Post Chase and increased in value. The sponsorship by the Racing Post continued until 2011. In the 2012 the sponsorship was taken over by rival weekend newspaper Racing Plus who backed the race until 2013, and in 2014 the sponsorship passed to BetBright. It was sponsored by Betdaq in 2018, 888sport in 2019, Betway in 2020 and Close Brothers Group in 2021. In 2022 Ladbrokes Coral took over the sponsorship. The race held Grade 3 status until 2022 and was re-classified as a Premier Handicap from the 2023 running when Grade 3 status was renamed by the British Horseracing Authority.

The race often serves as a trial for the Grand National, and two horses have won both races in the same year. Both of these horses, Rhyme 'n' Reason (1988) and Rough Quest (1996), also competed in the Cheltenham Gold Cup between their victories.

== Records ==
Most successful horse (2 wins):

- Docklands Express – 1991, 1992
- Nacarat – 2009, 2012

Leading jockey (5 wins):

- Richard Johnson – Gloria Victis (2000), Young Spartacus (2001), Gunther McBride (2002), Farmer Jack (2005), Quinz (2011)

Leading trainer (4 wins):

- Peter Cazalet- Lochroe (1958), The Rip (1965), Kapeno (1966), Different Class (1968)
- Philip Hobbs – Dr Leunt (1999), Gunther McBride (2002), Farmer Jack (2005), Quinz (2011)

== Winners ==
- Weights given in stones and pounds.

Year	Winner	Age	Weight	Jockey	Trainer
1949	Royal Mount	10	11-05	Patrick Doyle	Major Bay Powell
1950	Printers Pie	6	11-02	Len Stephens	Gerald Wilson
1951	Cadamstown	11	10-09	Jack Dowdeswell	V Brunt
1952	Mont Tremblant	6	11-05	Dave Dick	Fulke Walwyn
1953	Wigby	7	11-00	Dick Francis	Frank Cundell
1954	Claude Duval	9	10–13	John Beasty	Peter Thrale
1955	Halloween	10	12-06	Fred Winter	Bill Wightman
1956	Abandoned because of snow and frost
1957	Pointsman	9	12-01	Bert Morrow	A Kilpatrick
1958	Lochroe	10	11–13	Edward Cazalet (Note: amateur jockey)	Peter Cazalet
1959	Stanton Johnie	9	09-12	Ralph Hirons	Derek Ancil
1960	Dandy Scot	10	11-04	Fred Winter	Ryan Price
1961	Pouding	8	10–08	Fred Winter	Fulke Walwyn
1962	Frenchman's Cove	7	11–13	Stan Mellor	Harry Thomson Jones
1963	Dark Venetian	8	10–10	Dave Bassett	Bob Bassett
1964	Abandoned because of frost
1965	The Rip	10	12-00	Dave Dick	Peter Cazalet
1966	Kapeno	9	11-01	David Mould	Peter Cazalet
1967	Maigret	10	10-04	Johnny Haine	Ivor Herbert
1968	Different Class	8	11-09	David Mould	Peter Cazalet
1969	Bassnet	10	11-09	Josh Gifford	Ryan Price
1970	Titus Oates	8	11–12	Stan Mellor	Gordon W. Richards
1971	The Laird	10	11-00	Jeff King	Bob Turnell
1972	Crisp	9	12-00	Richard Pitman	Fred Winter
1973	Pendil	8	12-00	Richard Pitman	Fred Winter
1974	Pendil	9	12-00	Richard Pitman	Fred Winter
1975	Cuckolder	10	10-00	Andy Turnell	Bob Turnell
1976	Canadius	7	10-09	Jonjo O'Neill	Gordon W. Richards
1977	Don't Hesitate	7	09-09	Martin O'Halloran	Peter Cundell
1978	Fort Devon	12	12-00	Bill Smith	Fulke Walwyn
1979	Strombolus	8	10–10	Bob Champion	Peter Bailey
1980	Father Delaney	8	10–11	Alan Brown	Peter Easterby
1981	Sugarally	8	10-00	Peter Scudamore	G Fairbairn
1982	Two Swallows	9	10-09	Anthony Webber	Roddy Armytage
1983	Manton Castle	9	11-07	Hywel Davies	Josh Gifford
1984	Tom's Little Al	8	10-03	Colin Brown	W R Williams
1985	Abandoned because of frost
1986	Abandoned because of frost
1987	Combs Ditch	11	11-07	Colin Brown	David Elsworth
1988	Rhyme 'n' Reason	9	10–11	Brendan Powell	David Elsworth
1989	Bonanza Boy	8	11-01	Peter Scudamore	Martin Pipe
1990	Desert Orchid	11	12-03	Richard Dunwoody	David Elsworth
1991	Docklands Express	9	10-07	Anthony Tory	Kim Bailey
1992	Docklands Express	10	11–10	Anthony Tory	Kim Bailey
1993	Zeta's Lad	10	10–10	John White	John Upson
1994	Antonin	6	10-04	John Burke	Sue Bramall
1995	Val d'Alene	8	11-02	Adam Kondrat	François Doumen
1996	Rough Quest	10	10-08	Richard Dunwoody	Terry Casey
1997	Mudahim	11	10-02	Rodney Farrant	Jenny Pitman
1998	Super Tactics	10	10–10	Andrew Thornton	Robert Alner
1999	Dr Leunt	8	11-05	Richard Dunwoody	Philip Hobbs
2000	Gloria Victis	6	11–10	Richard Johnson	Martin Pipe
2001	Young Spartacus	8	11-03	Richard Johnson	Henry Daly
2002	Gunther McBride	7	10-03	Richard Johnson	Philip Hobbs
2003	La Landiere	8	11-07	Warren Marston	Richard Phillips
2004	Marlborough	12	11–12	Ruby Walsh	Nicky Henderson
2005	Farmer Jack	9	11–12	Richard Johnson	Philip Hobbs
2006	Innox (Note: The 2006 running took place at Sandown Park as Kempton was closed for redevelopment)	10	11-00	Tony McCoy	François Doumen
2007	Simon	8	11-05	Andrew Thornton	John Spearing
2008	Gungadu	8	11–12	Ruby Walsh	Paul Nicholls
2009	Nacarat	8	10–13	Tony McCoy	Tom George
2010	Razor Royale	8	10-05	Paddy Brennan	Nigel Twiston-Davies
2011	Quinz	7	11-00	Richard Johnson	Philip Hobbs
2012	Nacarat	11	11-08	Paddy Brennan	Tom George
2013	Opening Batsman	7	10-05	Noel Fehily	Harry Fry
2014	Bally Legend	9	10–12	Ian Popham	Caroline Keevil
2015	Rocky Creek	9	11–11	Sam Twiston-Davies	Paul Nicholls
2016	Theatre Guide	9	10-06	Paddy Brennan	Colin Tizzard
2017	Pilgrims Bay	7	10-02	James Best	Neil Mulholland
2018	Master Dee	9	11-05	Barry Geraghty	Fergal O'Brien
2019	Walt	8	10-06	Sam Twiston-Davies	Neil Mulholland
2020	Mister Malarky	7	11-00	Jonjo O’Neill Jr	Colin Tizzard
2021	Clondaw Castle	9	11-08	Jonathan Burke	Tom George
2022	Cap Du Nord	9	10-00	Jack Tudor	Christian Williams
2023	Our Power	8	10-08	Sam Twiston-Davies	Sam Thomas
2024	Forward Plan	8	10-06	Ben Godfrey	Anthony Honeyball
2025	Katate Dori	7	10-05	Charlie Deutsch	Sam Thomas
2026	Lookaway	9	11-02	Jack Quinlan	Neil King

== See also ==
- Horse racing in Great Britain
- List of British National Hunt races

== Sources ==
- Racing Post:
  - 1988, 1989, 1990, 1991, 1992, 1993, 1994, 1995, 1996, 1997
  - 1998, 1999, 2000, 2001, 2002, 2003, 2004, 2005, 2006, 2007
  - 2008, 2009, 2010, 2011, 2012, 2013, 2014, 2015, 2016, 2017
  - 2018, 2019, 2020, 2021, 2022, 2023, 2024

- pedigreequery.com – Racing Post Chase – Kempton.
- Ladbrokes Pocket Companion 1990/91. Aesculus Press. 1990. p. 54. ISBN 1-871093-21-X.
