= Pendil Novices' Chase =

Steeplechase horse race in Britain

Pendil Novices' Chase
2026
Jax Junior	Jasmine Bliss	Old Cowboy

Previous years
2025
Rubaud	Boombawn	Mark Of Gold
2024
Blow Your Wad	Tahmuras	Pembroke
2023
Solo	Datsalrightgino	Boothill
2022
Pic D'Orhy	Millers Bank	Fantastic Lady
2021
Tamaroc Du Mathan	Ga Law	Coole Cody

2020-2011
2020
Who Dares Wins	Southfield Stone	Commanche Red
2019
Bags Groove	Castafiore	Good Man Pat
2018
Cyrname	The Unit	For Good Measure
2017
Frodon	Gold Present	Charmix
2016
Killala Quay	Twelve Roses	Cloonacool
2015
Irish Saint	Hollow Penny	Melodic Rendezvous
2014
Balder Success	God's Own	Fox Appeal
2013
Grandioso	Molotof	Tour D'argent
2012
Cristal Bonus	Duke of Lucca	Life of a Luso
2011
Captain Chris	Adams Island	American Trilogy

2010-2001
2010
The Nightingale	Othermix	Mount Oscar
2009
Herecomesthetruth	Au Courant	Ouzbeck
2008
Oslot	Lead On	Pancake
2007
Natal	Good Spirit	Ursis
2006
Napolitain	Gallant Approach	Lago d'Oro
2005
Limerick Boy	Lacdoudal	Duncliffe
2004
Calling Brave	Atum Re	Santenay
2003
Hand Inn Hand	Druid's Glen	Scots Grey
2002
Golden Goal	Biliverdin	Sterling Stewart
2001
Crocadee	Biliverdin	Gastina

2000-1991
2000
Serenus	Young Spartacus	Jungli
1999
Makounji	No Retreat	King of Sparta
1998
Stormy Passage	Sir Dante	Mr Strong Gale
1997
Land Afar	Around The Gale	Greenback
1996
Draborgie	Inchcailloch	Only two finished
1995
Brief Gale	Kadi	Dancing Paddy
1994
Monsieur Le Cure	In The Navy	Only two finished
1993
Snitton Lane	Atlaal	Nathir
1992
Tinryland	Man on the Line	Deadly Charm
1991
Remittance Man	Monumental Lad	Repeat The Dose

1990-1988
1990
Combermere	Certain Style	Holtermann
1989
Brookmount	Skylark Wonder	Serious Man
1988
Saffron Lord	Flag Of Truce	Prideaux Boy

The Pendil Novices' Chase is a Grade 2 National Hunt steeplechase in Great Britain which is open to horses aged five years or older. It is run at Kempton Park over a distance of about 2 miles and 4 1/2 furlongs (2 miles, 4 furlongs and 110 yards, or 4,124 metres), and during its running there are sixteen fences to be jumped. The race is for novice chasers, and it is scheduled to take place each year in late February.

The event is named after Pendil, a dual-winner of Kempton's King George VI Chase in the 1970s. It used to be named after an earlier "King George" winner, Galloway Braes. For a period the Galloway Braes Novices' Chase was contested over 2 miles, and it was extended to 2 1/2 miles in 1990. It was renamed and increased to its present length in 1993.

== Records ==
Leading jockey (6 wins):

- Ruby Walsh – Natal (2007), Oslot (2008), Herecomesthetruth (2009), The Nightingale (2010), Cristal Bonus (2012), Grandioso (2013)

Leading trainer (14 wins):

- Paul Nicholls – Napolitain (2006), Natal (2007), Oslot (2008), Herecomesthetruth (2009), The Nightingale (2010), Cristal Bonus (2012), Grandioso (2013), Irish Saint (2015), Frodon (2017), Cyrname (2018), Tamaroc Du Mathan (2021), Pic D'Orhy (2022), Solo (2023), Rubaud (2025)

== Winners ==
Year	Winner	Age	Jockey	Trainer
1965	Solbina	8	Eddie Harty	Fred Winter
1966	Stalbridge Colonist	7	Stan Mellor	Ken Cundell
1967	China	6	David Nicholson	Frenchie Nicholson
1968	Vital Moment	5	Eddie Harty	Fred Winter
1969	Charter Flight	7	Jeff King	Bob Turnell
1970	Into View	7	Paul Kelleway	Fred Winter
1971	Stradivarius	7	Bill Smith	Les Kennard
1972	Pendil	7	Richard Pitman	Fred Winter
1973	Cinvultrist	7	Gerry McNally	G Bach
1974(D1)	Merry Maker	9	Anthony Mildmay-White (Note: amateur jockey)	G Doidge
1974(D2)	Remigio	6	Charlie Goldsworthy	Jack O'Donoghue
1975	Uncle Byng	6	Sandy May	G Doidge
1976	Brawny Scot	6	John Francome	Fred Winter
1977	Young Arthur	8	Bill Smith	Derek Kent
1978	Dyscole	6	Peter Haynes	Derek Kent
1979	Dramatist	8	Bill Smith	Fulke Walwyn
1980	Doddington Park	7	Jeff King	Nick Gaselee
1981	Balmers Coombe	9	Oliver Sherwood	N Mitchell
1982	Water Rock	7	R Hoare	John Thorne
1983	Branding Iron	6	Robert Earnshaw	Michael Dickinson
1984	Mossy Moore	8	John Francome	B Chinn
1985	Abandoned due to frost
1986	Abandoned due to frost
1987	Panto Prince	6	Brendan Powell	Les Kennard
1988	Saffron Lord	6	Richard Rowe	Josh Gifford
1989	Brookmount	7	Peter Hobbs	Josh Gifford
1990	Combermere	6	Richard Frost	Jimmy Frost
1991	Remittance Man	7	Richard Dunwoody	Nicky Henderson
1992	Tinryland	8	Jamie Osborne	Nicky Henderson
1993	Snitton Lane	7	Richard Dunwoody	John Edwards
1994	Monsieur Le Cure	8	Norman Williamson	John Edwards
1995	Brief Gale	8	Philip Hide	Josh Gifford
1996	Draborgie	5	Chris Maude	Martin Pipe
1997	Land Afar	10	Adrian Maguire	Paul Webber
1998	Stormy Passage	8	Richard Dunwoody	Philip Hobbs
1999	Makounji	5	Mick Fitzgerald	Nicky Henderson
2000	Serenus	7	Mick Fitzgerald	Nicky Henderson
2001	Crocadee	8	Norman Williamson	Venetia Williams
2002	Golden Goal	6	Norman Williamson	Venetia Williams
2003	Hand Inn Hand	7	Richard Johnson	Henry Daly
2004	Calling Brave	8	Tony McCoy	Nicky Henderson
2005	Limerick Boy	7	Sam Thomas	Venetia Williams
2006 (Note: The 2006 running took place at Sandown Park as Kempton was closed for redevelopment)	Napolitain	5	Christian Williams	Paul Nicholls
2007	Natal	6	Ruby Walsh	Paul Nicholls
2008	Oslot	6	Ruby Walsh	Paul Nicholls
2009	Herecomesthetruth	7	Ruby Walsh	Paul Nicholls
2010	The Nightingale	7	Ruby Walsh	Paul Nicholls
2011	Captain Chris	7	Richard Johnson	Philip Hobbs
2012	Cristal Bonus	6	Ruby Walsh	Paul Nicholls
2013	Grandioso	6	Ruby Walsh	Paul Nicholls
2014	Balder Succes	6	Wayne Hutchinson	Alan King
2015	Irish Saint	6	Sam Twiston-Davies	Paul Nicholls
2016	Killala Quay	9	Richard Johnson	Charlie Longsdon
2017	Frodon	5	Sam Twiston-Davies	Paul Nicholls
2018	Cyrname	6	Sean Bowen	Paul Nicholls
2019	Bags Groove	8	Noel Fehily	Harry Fry
2020	Who Dares Wins	8	Tom Cannon	Alan King
2021	Tamaroc Du Mathan	6	Harry Cobden	Paul Nicholls
2022	Pic D'Orhy	7	Harry Cobden	Paul Nicholls
2023	Solo	7	Harry Cobden	Paul Nicholls
2024	Blow Your Wad	6	Stan Sheppard	Tom Lacey
2025	Rubaud	7	Harry Cobden	Paul Nicholls
2026	Jax Junior	7	Tom Cannon	Lucy Wadham

== See also ==
- Horse racing in Great Britain
- List of British National Hunt races
