= Noel Novices' Chase =

Steeplechase horse race in Britain

Noel Novices' Chase
2025
| Steel Ally | Push The Button | No Questions Asked |

Previous years
2024
Mark Of Gold | Personal Ambition | Johnnywho
2023
Djelo | Kandoo Kid | Might
2021
Pic D'Orhy | Faivoir | Up The Straight

2020–2011
2020
Allart | Fiddlerontheroof | Kiltealy Briggs
2019
Angels Breath | Mont Des Avaloirs | Only two ran
2018
Vinndication | Jerrysback | Lil Rockerfeller
2017
Benatar | Finian's Oscar | Dolos
2016
Politologue | Rock The Kasbah | Royal Vacation
2015
Le Mercurey | Thomas Brown | Out Sam
2014
Ptit Zig | Josses Hill | Dunraven Storm
2013
Fox Appeal | Raya Star | Mr Mole
2012
Simonsig | Sulpius | Only two finished
2011
Zaynar | Kumbeshwar | Frascati Park

2010–2001
2008
Deep Purple | Turkish Surprise | Panjo Bere
2007
Hobbs Hill | Battlecry | Keepthedreamalive
2006
Briareus | Knight Legend | Royal Shakespeare
2003
Supreme Prince | See You Sometime | One Nation
2002
Tarxien | Scots Grey | Palarshan
2001
Seebald | Returning | St Pirran

2000–1994
2000
Galant Moss | Shooting Light | Sadler's Realm
1999
Toto Toscato | Red Blazer | Good Vibes
1998
Kurakka | Strong Paladin | Billingsgate
1997
Chief's Song | Jefferies | Only two finished
1996
Simply Dashing | Or Royal | Oh So Risky
1995
Senor El Betrutti | Challenger Du Luc | Cumbrian Challenge
1994
Book of Music I | Martin's Lamp | Leotard

The Noel Novices' Chase is a Grade 2 National Hunt steeplechase in Britain. It is run at Ascot over a distance of about 2 miles and 3 furlongs (2 miles 2 furlongs and 175 yards, or 3,781 metres), and during its running there are 16 fences to be jumped. The race is scheduled to take place each year in December.

The race was known as the Peter Cox Novices' Chase until 1989.

== Records ==
Leading jockey since 1970 (5 wins):

- Richard Dunwoody – The Proclamation (1989), Remittance Man (1990), Simply Dashing (1996), Chief's Song (1997), Kurakka (1998)

Leading trainers since 1970 (6 wins):

- Fred Winter – Pendil (1971), Killiney (1972), Paddy's Road House (1973), Venture To Cognac (1979), Half Free (1982), Aces Wild (1983)

(5 wins):

- Nicky Henderson – The Proclamation (1989), Remittance Man (1990), Simonsig (2012), Angels Breath (2019), Allart (2020)

== Winners ==
| Year | Winner | Age | Jockey | Trainer |
|---|---|---|---|---|
| 1970 | Moon Storm | 7 | Richard Dennard | Ken Cundell |
| 1971 | Pendil | 6 | Richard Pitman | Fred Winter |
| 1972 | Killiney | 6 | Richard Pitman | Fred Winter |
| 1973 | Paddy's Road House | 5 | Richard Pitman | Fred Winter |
| 1974 | Broncho II | 5 | Michael Dickinson | Tony Dickinson |
| 1975 | Ghost Writer | 8 | Bill Smith | Fulke Walwyn |
| 1976 | Abandoned due to frost |
| 1977 | Artifice | 6 | Peter Hobbs | John Thorne |
| 1978 | Night Nurse | 7 | Ian Watkinson | Peter Easterby |
| 1979 | Venture To Cognac | 6 | Mr Oliver Sherwood | Fred Winter |
| 1980 | Acrow Lad | 6 | Steve Jobar | David Elsworth |
| 1981 | Abandoned due to snow |
| 1982 | Half Free | 6 | Richard Linley | Fred Winter |
| 1983 | Aces Wild | 5 | John Francome | Fred Winter |
| 1984 | Buckbe | 5 | Colin Brown | David Elsworth |
| 1985 | Desert Orchid | 6 | Colin Brown | David Elsworth |
| 1986 | Cavies Clown | 6 | Ross Arnott | David Elsworth |
| 1987 | Bonanza Boy | 6 | Peter Hobbs | Philip Hobbs |
| 1988 | Larchwood | 7 | Kevin Mooney | Simon Christian |
| 1989 | The Proclamation | 6 | Richard Dunwoody | Nicky Henderson |
| 1990 | Remittance Man | 6 | Richard Dunwoody | Nicky Henderson |
| 1991 | Abandoned due to frost |
| 1992 | Retail Runner | 7 | Declan Murphy | Josh Gifford |
| 1993 | Easy Buck | 6 | Chris Maude | Nick Gaselee |
| 1994 | Book of Music I | 6 | Norman Williamson | Kim Bailey |
| 1995 | Senor El Betrutti | 6 | Graham Bradley | Susan Nock |
| 1996 | Simply Dashing | 5 | Richard Dunwoody | Mick Easterby |
| 1997 | Chief's Song | 7 | Richard Dunwoody | Simon Dow |
| 1998 | Kurakka | 5 | Richard Dunwoody | Josh Gifford |
| 1999 | Toto Toscato | 5 | Richard Johnson | Alan King |
| 2000 | Galant Moss | 6 | Tony McCoy | Martin Pipe |
| 2001 | Seebald | 6 | Tony McCoy | Martin Pipe |
| 2002 | Tarxien | 8 | Tony McCoy | Martin Pipe |
| 2003 | Supreme Prince | 8 | Paul Flynn | Philip Hobbs |
| 2004 (Note: The 2004 and 2005 runnings took place at Windsor while Ascot was closed for redevelopment) | See You Sometime | 9 | Andrew Thornton | Seamus Mullins |
| 2005 | The Listener | 6 | Andrew Thornton | Robert Alner |
| 2006 | Briareus | 6 | Mark Bradburne | Andrew Balding |
| 2007 | Hobbs Hill | 8 | Tony McCoy | Charlie Egerton |
| 2008 | Deep Purple | 7 | Paul Moloney | Evan Williams |
| 2009 | Abandoned due to snow |
| 2010 | Abandoned due to frost |
| 2011 | Zaynar | 6 | James Reveley | Nick Williams |
| 2012 | Simonsig | 6 | Barry Geraghty | Nicky Henderson |
| 2013 | Fox Appeal | 6 | Aidan Coleman | Emma Lavelle |
| 2014 | Ptit Zig | 5 | Sam Twiston-Davies | Paul Nicholls |
| 2015 | Le Mercurey | 5 | Sam Twiston-Davies | Paul Nicholls |
| 2016 | Politologue | 5 | Sam Twiston-Davies | Paul Nicholls |
| 2017 | Benatar | 5 | Jamie Moore | Gary Moore |
| 2018 | Vinndication | 5 | David Bass | Kim Bailey |
| 2019 | Angels Breath | 5 | Nico de Boinville | Nicky Henderson |
| 2020 | Allart | 6 | Nico de Boinville | Nicky Henderson |
| 2021 | Pic D'Orhy | 6 | Harry Cobden | Paul Nicholls |
| 2022 | Abandoned due to frost |
| 2023 | Djelo | 5 | Charlie Deutsch | Venetia Williams |
| 2024 | Mark Of Gold | 7 | Caoilin Quinn | Gary & Josh Moore |
| 2025 | Steel Ally | 7 | Dylan Johnston | Sam Thomas |

== See also ==
- Horse racing in Great Britain
- List of British National Hunt races
