= John Francome Novices' Chase =

Steeplechase horse race in Britain

Berkshire Novices' Chase
2025
Wendigo	No Questions Asked	Regent's Stroll

Previous years
2024
The Jukebox Man	Masaccio	Johnnywho
2023
Hermes Allen	Nickle Back	Tightenourbelts
2022
Sebastopol	Stage Star	Wonderwall
2021
Nassalam	Tea Clipper	Only two finished

2020-2011
2020
Caribean Boy	Fiddlerontheroof	Getaway Trump
2019
Champ	Black Op	Deyrann de Carjac
2018
La Bague Au Roi	Talkischeap	Lostintranslation
2017
Willoughby Court	Yanworth	Adrien Du Pont
2016
Clan Des Obeaux	Virgilio	Our Kaempfer
2015
Three Musketeers	Activial	L'unique
2014
Coneygree	Dell' Arca	Horatio Hornblower
2013
Wonderful Charm	Up To Something	The Romford Pele
2012
Dynaste	Court in Motion	Theatre Guide
2011
Bobs Worth	Cue Card	Mad Moose

2010-2001
2010
Cois Farraig	On Borrowed Wings	Celestial Halo
2009
Punchestowns	Martys Mission	Red Admiral
2008
The Market Man	Kicks For Free	Oh Crick
2007
Hobbs Hill	Silverburn	Papini
2006
Denman	Snakebite	High Chimes
2005
Albuhera	Copsale Lad	Without A Doubt
2004
Vodka Bleu	Fundamentalist	See You Sometime
2003
Puntal	Buckby Lane	Only two ran
2002
Jair Du Cochet	Scots Grey	Ask The Natives
2001
Katarino	Mr Cool	Innox
2002
Jair Du Cochet	Scots Grey	Ask The Natives
2001
Katarino	Mr Cool	Innox

2000-1991
2000
Bacchanal	Wahiba Sands	Sadler's Realm
1999
Gloria Victis	Windross	Tara-Brogan
1998
Moor Lane	Looks Like Trouble	Only two finished
1997
Sounds Fyne	Landed Gentry	Feel The Power
1996
Buckhouse Boy	Foodbroker Star	Take The Buckskin
1995
Major Summit	Berude Not To	Castle Court
1994
The Frog Prince	Brave Highlander	Maamur
1993
Spirit Of Kibris	Fantus	Paper Star
1992
Cogent	Propero	Sunley Bay
1991
Granvillewaterford	Furry Knowe	Jeassu

1990-1988
1990
Remittance Man	Crawfordstown	Only two finished
1989
Going Gets Tough	Earl Soham	Fit For Firing
1988
Sir Blake	Brown Windsor	Secret Rite
1987
Private Views	The West Awake	Glenavey

The John Francome Novices' Chase is a Grade 2 National Hunt chase in Great Britain which is open to horses aged four years or older. It is run at Newbury, Berkshire, over a distance of about 2 miles and 4 furlongs (2 miles 3 furlongs and 187 yards, or 4,367 metres), and during its running there are sixteen fences to be jumped. The race is for novice chasers, and it is scheduled to take place each year in late November or early December.

The race was originally run over 3 miles until it was reduced in distance from 1973. Prior to 1991 the event was known as the Hopeful Chase, but was then renamed as the Fulke Walwyn Novices' Chase, in memory of the racehorse trainer Fulke Walwyn. It attained Listed status in 2001, and it was promoted to Grade 2 level in 2004. The race was renamed the Berkshire Novices' Chase in 2006. From 2011 to 2016 the race was sponsored by Fuller's Brewery and run as the Fuller's London Pride Novices' Chase. Since 2017 it has been sponsored by Ladbrokes. The race was given its current name in 2023 after the previous John Francome Novices' Chase, a three-mile race, was withdrawn from the calendar.

== Records ==
Leading jockey since 1973 (4 wins):

- John Francome – The Dealer (1977), Snowtown Boy (1980), Brown Chamberlin (1981), Great Light (1984)
- Barry Geraghty – The Market Man (2008), Punchestowns (2009), Bobs Worth (2011), Champ (2019)

Leading trainer since 1973 (8 wins):

- Nicky Henderson – Remittance Man (1990), Bacchanal (2000), Katarino (2001), The Market Man (2008), Punchestowns (2009), Bobs Worth (2011), Champ (2019), Caribean Boy (2020)

== Winners since 1973 ==
Year	Winner	Age	Jockey	Trainer
1973	Spindrift	7	Nigel Wakley	H Handel
1974	Isle Of Man	7	Bill Smith	Fulke Walwyn
1975	Accord	8	Andy Turnell	Bob Turnell
1976	Graigue House	8	Nigel Wakley	Miss S Morris
1977	The Dealer	7	John Francome	Fred Winter
1978	Hesgotit	9	Sandy May	Ted Fisher
1979	Kybo	6	Richard Rowe	Josh Gifford
1980	Snowtown Boy	5	John Francome	Fred Winter
1981	Brown Chamberlin	6	John Francome	Fred Winter
1982	Everett	7	Stuart Shilston	Fulke Walwyn
1983	Voice Of Progress	5	Peter Scudamore	David Nicholson
1984	Great Light	6	John Francome	John Jenkins
1985	The Breener	6	Simon Sherwood	Oliver Sherwood
1986	Playschool	8	Paul Nicholls	David Barons
1987	Private Views	6	Kevin Mooney	Nick Gaselee
1988	Sir Blake	7	Brendan Powell Snr	David Elsworth
1989	Going Gets Tough	6	Jimmy Frost	Toby Balding
1990	Remittance Man	6	Richard Dunwoody	Nicky Henderson
1991	Granvillewaterford	6	Jamie Osborne	Simon Sherwood
1992	Cogent	8	Simon McNeill	Andy Turnell
1993	Spirit of Kibris	8	Jamie Osborne	Jenny Pitman
1994	The Frog Prince	6	Jamie Osborne	Nick Gaselee
1995	Major Summit	6	Simon McNeill	Josh Gifford
1996	Buckhouse Boy	6	Chris Maude	Nigel Twiston-Davies
1997	Sounds Fyne	8	Mick Fitzgerald	Jimmy FitzGerald
1998	Moor Lane	6	Richard Dunwoody	Ian Balding
1999	Gloria Victis	5	Tony McCoy	Martin Pipe
2000	Bacchanal	6	Richard Johnson	Nicky Henderson
2001	Katarino	6	Norman Williamson	Nicky Henderson
2002	Jair du Cochet	5	Jacques Ricou	Guillaume Macaire
2003	Puntal	7	Tony McCoy	Martin Pipe
2004	Vodka Bleu	5	Timmy Murphy	Martin Pipe
2005	Albuhera	7	Joe Tizzard	Paul Nicholls
2006	Denman	6	Sam Thomas	Paul Nicholls
2007	Hobbs Hill	8	Tony McCoy	Charles Egerton
2008	The Market Man	8	Barry Geraghty	Nicky Henderson
2009	Punchestowns	6	Barry Geraghty	Nicky Henderson
2010	Cois Farraig	5	Dominic Elsworth	Paul Webber
2011	Bobs Worth	6	Barry Geraghty	Nicky Henderson
2012	Dynaste	6	Tom Scudamore	David Pipe
2013	Wonderful Charm	5	Daryl Jacob	Paul Nicholls
2014	Coneygree	7	Nico de Boinville	Mark Bradstock
2015	Three Musketeers	5	Harry Skelton	Dan Skelton
2016	Clan des Obeaux	4	Sean Bowen	Paul Nicholls
2017	Willoughby Court	6	Nico de Boinville	Ben Pauling
2018	La Bague Au Roi	7	Richard Johnson	Warren Greatrex
2019	Champ	6	Barry Geraghty	Nicky Henderson
2020	Caribbean Boy	7	Daryl Jacob	Nicky Henderson
2021	Nassalam	4	Jamie Moore	Gary Moore
2022	Sebastopol	8	Stan Sheppard	Tom Lacey
2023	Hermes Allen	6	Harry Cobden	Paul Nicholls
2024	The Jukebox Man	6	Ben Jones	Ben Pauling
2025	Wendigo	6	Gavin Sheehan	Jamie Snowden

== See also ==
- Horse racing in Great Britain
- List of British National Hunt races
