= Henry VIII Novices' Chase =

Steeplechase horse race in Britain

- Class: Grade 1
- Location: Sandown Park Racecourse; Esher, England
- Race type: Steeplechase
- Sponsor: Betfair
- Website: Sandown Park

Race information
- Distance: 1 mile 7 furlongs 99 yards (3,108 metres)
- Surface: Turf
- Track: Right-handed
- Qualification: Four-years-old and up
- Weight: 11 st 1 lb (4yo); 11 st 7 lb (5yo+); Allowances; 7 lb for fillies and mares
- Purse: £100,000 (2025); 1st: £45,560

Henry VIII Novices' Chase
2025
Lulamba	Be Aware	Lump Sum

Previous years
2024
L'eau Du Sud	Touch Me Not	Down Memory Lane
2023
Le Patron	Colonel Harry	JPR One
2022
Jonbon	Boothill	Unexpected Party
2021
Edwardstone	War Lord	Third Time Lucki

2020-2011
2020
Allmankind	Hitman	Ga Law
2019
Esprit Du Large	Nube Negra	Grand Sancy
2018
Dynamite Dollars	Ornua	Lalor
2017
Sceau Royal	North Hill Harvey	Finian's Oscar
2016
Altior	Charbel	Max Ward
2015
Ar Mad	Bristol De Mai	As De Mee
2014
Vibrato Valtat	Dunraven Storm	Irish Saint
2013
Hinterland	Grandouet	Taquin Du Seuil
2012
Captain Conan	Hinterland	Third Intention
2011
Al Ferof	For Non Stop	Lancetto

2010-2001
2009
Somersby	Crack Away Jack	Tchico Polos
2008
Araldur	Free World	Astarador
2007
Marodima	Mahogany Blaze	Pancake
2006
Fair Along	My Way de Solzen	New Little Bric
2005
Racing Demon	Hoo La Baloo	Cerium
2004
Contraband	The Last Cast	Made in Japan
2003
Thisthatandtother	Atum Re	Chauvinist
2002
Impek	Le Roi Miguel	Tysou
2001
Fondmort	Returning	Krabloonik

2000-1991
2000
Crocadee	Corniche	Sandy Duff
1999
Decoupage	Wakeel	Gloria Victis
1998
Dines	Dawn Leader	Billingsgate
1997
Direct Route	Crack On	Queen of Spades
1996
Mulligan	Land Afar	Down The Fell
1995
Certainly Strong	Captain Khedive	Simple Arithmetic
1994
Sound Reveille	King Credo	Spuffington
1993
Baydon Star	One More Dream	Strong Views
1992
Wonder Man	Peace Officer	Only two finished
1991
Peanuts Pet	Deadly Charm	Hickelton Lad

1990-1987
1990
Acre Hill	L B Laughs	General James
1989
Deep Flash	Wink Gulliver	Fuego Boy
1988
The Dragon Master	Southernair	I'm Bad
1987
Ballyhane	Sassanoco	Amrullah

The Henry VIII Novices' Chase is a Grade 1 National Hunt steeplechase in Great Britain which is open to horses aged four years or older. It is run at Sandown Park over a distance of about 1 mile 7½ furlongs (1 mile 7 furlongs and 99 yards, or 3,108 metres), and during its running there are thirteen fences to be jumped. The race is for novice chasers, and it is scheduled to take place each year in early December.

The event is named after Henry VIII, who commandeered Esher (the location of Sandown Park) as a royal hunting ground in the sixteenth century. In its analysis of the 2007 running, the Racing Post described the Henry VIII Novices' Chase as: "A race that has a very high standing in the calendar thanks to the exploits of past winners and subsequent Grade 1 stars like Direct Route, Decoupage, Fondmort, Impek, Thisthatandtother, Contraband and Racing Demon." It was raised to Grade 1 status in 2011 having previously been contested at Grade 2 level.

== Records ==
Leading jockey since 1976 (3 wins):

- Richard Rowe – Our Fun (1984), Midnight Count (1986), Ballyhane (1987)
- Richard Dunwoody – Acre Hill (1990), Wonder Man (1992), Certainly Strong (1995)

Leading trainer since 1976 (7 wins):

- Paul Nicholls – Dines (1998), Thisthatandtother (2003), Marodima (2007), Al Ferof (2011), Hinterland (2013), Vibrato Valtat (2014), Dynamite Dollars (2018)

== Winners ==
Year	Winner	Age	Jockey	Trainer
1976	Abandoned due to frost
1977	Prebihas	5	Roy Mangan	David Nicholson
1978	Abandoned due to frost
1979	Master Davenport	7	Mr Paul Webber	John Webber
1980	Easter Eel	9	John Francome	Fred Winter
1981 (Note: The 1981 running took place at Kempton Park)	Fifty Dollars More	6	John Francome	Fred Winter
1982	Kilbrittain Castle	6	Bill Smith	Fulke Walwyn
1983	Abandoned due to frost
1984	Our Fun	7	Richard Rowe	Josh Gifford
1985	Desert Orchid	6	Colin Brown	David Elsworth
1986	Midnight Count	6	Richard Rowe	Josh Gifford
1987	Ballyhane	6	Richard Rowe	Josh Gifford
1988	The Dragon Master	6	George Mernagh	Robert Waley-Cohen
1989	Deep Flash	6	Tom Morgan	John Edwards
1990	Acre Hill	6	Richard Dunwoody	Nicky Henderson
1991	Peanuts Pet	6	Trevor Wall	Bryan McMahon
1992	Wonder Man	7	Richard Dunwoody	David Nicholson
1993	Baydon Star	6	Adrian Maguire	David Nicholson
1994	Sound Reveille	6	Graham Bradley	Charlie Brooks
1995	Certainly Strong	5	Richard Dunwoody	David Nicholson
1996	Mulligan	6	Adrian Maguire	David Nicholson
1997	Direct Route	6	Tony McCoy	Howard Johnson
1998	Dines	6	Tony McCoy	Paul Nicholls
1999	Decoupage	7	Norman Williamson	Charles Egerton
2000 (Note: The 2000 running took place at Haydock Park)	Crocadee	7	Paul Flynn	Venetia Williams
2001	Fondmort	5	Mick Fitzgerald	Nicky Henderson
2002	Impek	6	Jim Culloty	Henrietta Knight
2003	Thisthatandtother	7	Ruby Walsh	Paul Nicholls
2004	Contraband	6	Timmy Murphy	Martin Pipe
2005	Racing Demon	5	Timmy Murphy	Henrietta Knight
2006	Fair Along	4	Richard Johnson	Philip Hobbs
2007	Marodima	4	Sam Thomas	Paul Nicholls
2008	Araldur	4	Robert Thornton	Alan King
2009	Somersby	5	Tony McCoy	Henrietta Knight
2010	Abandoned due to snow
2011	Al Ferof	6	Ruby Walsh	Paul Nicholls
2012	Captain Conan	5	Barry Geraghty	Nicky Henderson
2013	Hinterland	5	Daryl Jacob	Paul Nicholls
2014	Vibrato Valtat	5	Noel Fehily	Paul Nicholls
2015	Ar Mad	5	Joshua Moore	Gary Moore
2016	Altior	6	Noel Fehily	Nicky Henderson
2017	Sceau Royal	5	Daryl Jacob	Alan King
2018	Dynamite Dollars	5	Harry Cobden	Paul Nicholls
2019	Esprit Du Large	5	Adam Wedge	Evan Williams
2020	Allmankind	4	Harry Skelton	Dan Skelton
2021	Edwardstone	7	Tom Cannon	Alan King
2022	Jonbon	6	Aidan Coleman	Nicky Henderson
2023	La Patron	5	David Noonan	Gary Moore
2024	L'Eau Du Sud	6	Harry Skelton	Dan Skelton
2025	Lulamba	4	Nico de Boinville	Nicky Henderson

== See also ==
- Horse racing in Great Britain
- List of British National Hunt races
