= Persian War Novices' Hurdle =

Hurdle horse race in Britain

Unibet Persian War Novices' Hurdle
- Class: Grade 2
- Location: Chepstow Racecourse; Monmouthshire, Wales
- Race type: Hurdle
- Sponsor: DragonBet
- Website: Chepstow

Race information
- Distance: 2m 3f 100y (3,914 metres)
- Surface: Turf
- Track: Left-handed
- Qualification: Four-years-old and up
- Weight: 10 st 12 lb (4yo); 11 st 0 lb (5yo+); Allowances; 7 lb for fillies and mares Penalties; 5 lb for Class 1 wfa hurdle winners 3 lb for Class 1 hcap or Class 2 wfa hurdle winners
- Purse: £75,000 (2025); 1st: £tba

Persian War Novices' Hurdle
2026
| West Hill Verde | La Cote Fleurie | Lock Stock |

Previous years
2025
Sticktotheplan | Kainsbourg | Moneygarrow
2024
Flying Fortune | Intense Approach | Vincenzo
2023
Captain Teague | Resplendent Grey | Rock House
2022
Accidental Rebel | Outlaw Peter | Presentandcounting
2021
Camprond | Luttrell Lad | Up For Parol

2020-2011
2020
Mcfabulous | Courtandbould | One For The Team
2019
Thyme Hill | Fiddlerontheroof | Some Day Soon
2018
Secret Investor | Double Treasure | Gosheven
2017
Poetic Rhythm | Amour de Nuit | Vision Des Flos
2016
El Bandit | Coo Star Sivola | Mirsaale
2015
Roadie Joe | Cardinal Palace | Definite Outcome
2014
Blaklion | Vicente | The Pirate's Queen
2013
Timesremembered | Potters Cross | Lienosus
2012
Wonderful Charm | Ballybough Pat | Lienosus
2011
Fingal Bay | Baile Anrai | Current Event

2010-2001
2010
Silviniaco Conti | Captain Chris | Frascati Park
2009
Reve De Sivola | Frascati Park | Aiteen Thirtythree
2008
Hell's Bay | Tarablaze | No Panic
2007
Elusive Dream | Presenting Copper | Pigeon Island
2006
Kanpai | Massini's Maguire | Granit Jack
2005
Rimsky | Massini's Maguire | Gungadu
2004
Knowhere | Ladalko | Football Crazy
2003
Champagne Harry | Comply Or Die | Tresor Preziniere
2002
Supreme Prince | Priests Bridge | Native Sparkle
2001
One Knight | Polar Red | Battle Royal I

2000-1991
2000 (November)
Valley Henry | Risk Accessor | Garruth
2000 (February)
Monsignor | Bindaree | Regal Holly
1998
Red Curate | Strong Tel | Borazon
1997
Boardroom Shuffle | Mighty Moss | Marching Marquis
1996
Jet Rules | Sparkling Yasmin | Whattabob
1995
St Mellion Fairway | My Rossini | Tejano Gold
1993
High Alltitude | Castle Courageous | Now Your Talkin
1992
Mighty Mogul | Sweet Duke | Woodurather

1990-1988
1988
| Sir Blake | Rustle | Slalom |

The Unibet Persian War Novices' Hurdle is a Grade 2 National Hunt hurdle race in Great Britain which is open to horses aged four years or older. It is run at Chepstow over a distance of about 2 miles and 3½ furlongs (2 miles 3 furlong and 100 yards, or 3,914 metres), and during its running there are ten hurdles to be jumped. The race is for novice hurdlers, and it is scheduled to take place each year in October. It is currently sponsored by DragonBet and the 2025 renewal is worth £75,000 in prize money.

Replacing the Crick Hurdle, the first running took place in 1977. The event is named after Persian War, a three-time winner of the Champion Hurdle who was trained near Chepstow. It was formerly held in February, and for a period it was contested over 2 miles and 4½ furlongs. It was switched to November in the 2000–01 season, and at the same time its distance was cut by 110 yards. The race was moved to late October in 2004 and to an earlier date in October in 2015.

== Winners ==
| Year | Winner | Age | Jockey | Trainer |
|---|---|---|---|---|
| 1977 | The Dealer | 7 | John Francome | Fred Winter |
| 1978 | Ballyfin Lake | 7 | John Francome | Fred Winter |
| 1979 | Abandoned due to frost and snow |
| 1980 | Broadleas | 6 | Richard Rowe | Josh Gifford |
| 1981 | Abandoned due to waterlogging |
| 1982 | Arabian Music | 7 | Richard Rowe | Josh Gifford |
| 1983 | Abandoned due to frost |
| 1984 | Brown Trix | 6 | John Francome | Fred Winter |
| 1985 | Abandoned due to frost and snow |
| 1986 | Abandoned due to frost |
| 1987 | Bonanza Boy | 6 | Peter Hobbs | Philip Hobbs |
| 1988 | Sir Blake | 7 | Colin Brown | David Elsworth |
| 1989 | Abandoned due to waterlogging |
| 1990 | Abandoned due to waterlogging |
| 1991 | Abandoned due to snow |
| 1992 | Mighty Mogul | 5 | Mark Pitman | Jenny Pitman |
| 1993 | High Alltitude | 5 | Nick Bentley | George M. Moore |
| 1994 | Abandoned due to waterlogging |
| 1995 | St Mellion Fairway | 6 | Tom Grantham | Jim Old |
| 1996 | Jet Rules | 6 | Warren Marston | Jenny Pitman |
| 1997 | Boardroom Shuffle | 6 | Philip Hide | Josh Gifford |
| 1998 | Red Curate | 7 | Warren Marston | Graham McCourt |
| | no race 1999 |
| 2000 Feb (Note: It took place at Uttoxeter in February 2000) | Monsignor | 6 | Norman Williamson | Mark Pitman |
| 2000 Nov | Valley Henry | 5 | Joe Tizzard | Paul Nicholls |
| 2001 | One Knight | 5 | Paul Flynn | Philip Hobbs |
| 2002 | Supreme Prince | 5 | Paul Flynn | Philip Hobbs |
| 2003 | Champagne Harry | 5 | Carl Llewellyn | Nigel Twiston-Davies |
| 2004 | Knowhere | 6 | Carl Llewellyn | Nigel Twiston-Davies |
| 2005 | Rimsky | 4 | Carl Llewellyn | Nigel Twiston-Davies |
| 2006 | Kanpai | 4 | Tony McCoy | John O'Shea |
| 2007 | Elusive Dream | 6 | Ruby Walsh | Paul Nicholls |
| 2008 | Hell's Bay | 6 | Sam Thomas | Paul Nicholls |
| 2009 | Reve de Sivola | 4 | Daryl Jacob | Nick Williams |
| 2010 | Silviniaco Conti | 4 | Noel Fehily | Paul Nicholls |
| 2011 | Fingal Bay | 5 | Richard Johnson | Philip Hobbs |
| 2012 | Wonderful Charm | 4 | Ruby Walsh | Paul Nicholls |
| 2013 | Timesremembered | 5 | Leighton Aspell | Emma Lavelle |
| 2014 | Blaklion | 5 | Jamie Moore | Nigel Twiston-Davies |
| 2015 | Roadie Joe | 6 | Paul Moloney | Evan Williams |
| 2016 | El Bandit | 5 | Sean Bowen | Paul Nicholls |
| 2017 | Poetic Rhythm | 6 | Paddy Brennan | Fergal O'Brien |
| 2018 | Secret Investor | 6 | Harry Cobden | Paul Nicholls |
| 2019 | Thyme Hill | 5 | Richard Johnson | Philip Hobbs |
| 2020 | McFabulous | 6 | Harry Cobden | Paul Nicholls |
| 2021 | Camprond | 5 | Aidan Coleman | Philip Hobbs |
| 2022 | Accidental Rebel | 8 | Paddy Brennan | Fergal O'Brien |
| 2023 | Captain Teague | 5 | Harry Cobden | Paul Nicholls |
| 2024 | Intense Approach (Note: Flying Fortune finished first in 2024 but was later disqualified after testing positive for a prohibited substance) | 5 | Harry Cobden | John McConnell |
| 2025 | Sticktotheplan | 5 | Sean Bowen | Olly Murphy |
| 2026 | West Hill Verde | 6 | Callum Pritchard | Seamus Mullins |

== See also ==
- Horse racing in Great Britain
- List of British National Hunt races
