= Bet365 Gold Cup =

Steeplechase horse race in Britain

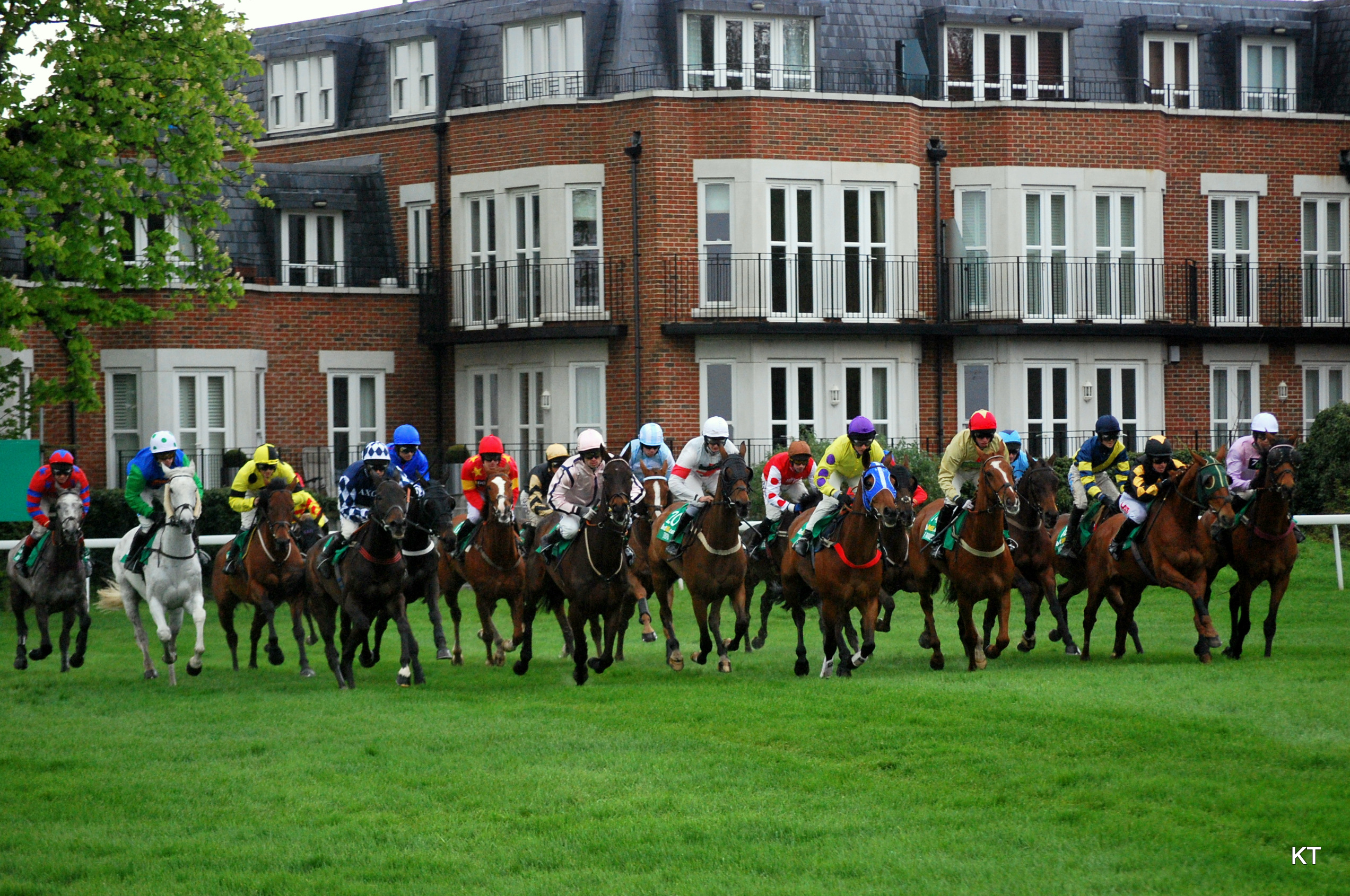
- The start of the 2012 running
- Class: Premier Handicap
- Location: Sandown Park; Esher, England
- Inaugurated: 1957
- Race type: Steeplechase
- Sponsor: Bet365
- Website: Sandown Park

Race information
- Distance: 3m 4½f (5,766 metres)
- Surface: Turf
- Track: Right-handed
- Qualification: Five-years-old and up
- Weight: Handicap
- Purse: £175,000 (2025); 1st: £98,473

bet365 Gold Cup Chase
2025
Resplendent Grey	Lombron	High Class Hero

Previous years
2024
Minella Cocooner	Annual Invictus	Nick Rockett
2023
Kitty's Light	Moroder	Revels Hill
2022
Hewick	Musical Slave	Kitty's Light
2021
Potterman	Kitty's Light	Enrilo

2020-2011
2019
Talkischeap	The Young Master	Step Back
2018
Step Back	Rock The Kasbah	Present Man
2017
Henllan Harri	Vyta Du Roc	Theatre Guide
2016
The Young Master	Just A Par	Sausalito Sunrise
2015
Just A Par	Vics Canvas	Le Reve
2014
Hadrian's Approach	Burton Port	Godsmejudge
2013
Quentin Collonges	Same Difference	Away We Go
2012
Tidal Bay	Roalco De Farges	Any Currency
2011
Poker De Sivola	Faasel	Baby Run

2010-2001
2010
Church Island	Hoo La Baloo	Lacdoudal
2009
Hennessy	Briery Fox	Lacdoudal
2008
Monkerhostin	Royal Auclair	Hoo La Baloo
2007
Hot Weld	Reveillez	My Will
2006
Lacdoudal	Eric's Charm	My Will
2005
Jack High	Juveigneur	Kelami
2004
Puntal	Royal Auclair	Montayral
2003
Ad Hoc	Stormez	Gunther McBride
2002
Bounce Back	Dark Stranger	Frenchman's Creek
2001
Ad Hoc	What's Up Boys	Scotton Green

2000-1991
2000
Beau	Folly Road	Paddy's Return
1999
Eulogy	Betty's Boy	Jathib
1998
Call It A Day	Fine Thyne	Eudipe
1997
Harwell Lad	Flyer's Nap	Mcgregor The Third
1996
Life of a Lord	Proud Sun	Amtrak Express
1995
Cache Fleur	Country Member	Gaelstrom
1994
Ushers Island	Antonin	Docklands Express
1993
Topsham Bay	Givus A Buck	Cahervillahow
1992
Topsham Bay	Arctic Call	The Leggett
1991
Docklands Express	Cahervillahow	Wont Be Gone Long

1990-1988
1990
Mr Frisk	Durham Edition	Four Trix
1989
Brown Windsor	Sam Da Vinci	Charter Party
1988
Desert Orchid	Kildimo	Strands of Gold

The Bet365 Gold Cup is a Premier Handicap National Hunt steeplechase in Great Britain which is open to horses aged five years or older. It is run at Sandown Park over a distance of about 3 miles and 4½ furlongs (3 miles, 4 furlongs and 146 yards, or 5,766 metres), and during its running there are twenty-four fences to be jumped. It is a handicap race, and it is scheduled to take place each year in late April.

== History ==
The event was established in 1957, and it was originally called the Whitbread Gold Cup. It was sponsored by Whitbread Brewers at the instigation of Colonel Bill Whitbread, the company's chairman, who had twice ridden in the Grand National as an amateur jockey. It was the first commercial sponsorship in British sport, and the longest-running until it ended in 2001.

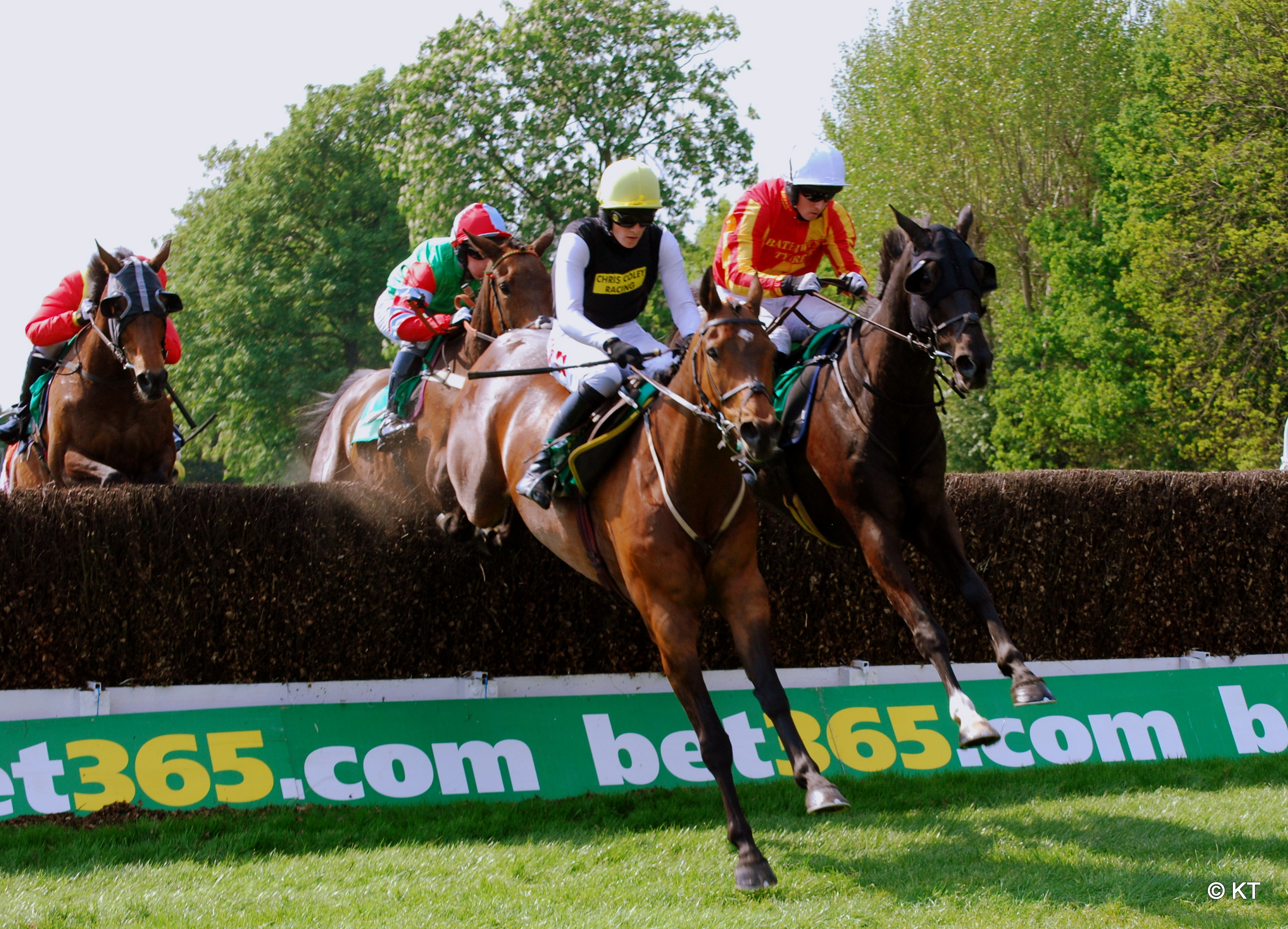
2011 Bet365 Gold Cup

In recent years the race has been sponsored by At the Races (2002–03), Betfred (2004–07) and Bet365 (2008–). The record for the longest-running sponsorship of a British horse race is now held by the John Smith's Cup.

The Bet365 Gold Cup takes place at a meeting which features both jump and flat races and marks the end of the National Hunt racing season in Great Britain. Other events at this meeting include the Celebration Chase, the Gordon Richards Stakes and the Sandown Mile.

== Records ==
Most successful horse (2 wins):

- Larbawn – 1968, 1969
- Diamond Edge – 1979, 1981
- Topsham Bay – 1992, 1993
- Ad Hoc – 2001, 2003

Leading jockey (3 wins):

- Ron Barry – Titus Oates (1971), Charlie Potheen (1973), The Dikler (1974)
- Sean Bowen – Just A Par (2015), Henllan Harri (2017), Resplendent Grey (2025)

Leading trainer (7 wins):

- Fulke Walwyn – Taxidermist (1958), Mill House (1967), Charlie Potheen (1973), The Dikler (1974), Diamond Edge (1979, 1981), Special Cargo (1984)

== Winners ==
- Weights given in stones and pounds.

Year	Winner	Age	Weight	Jockey	Trainer
1957	Much Obliged	9	10–12	Johnny East	Neville Crump
1958	Taxidermist	6	10-08	John Lawrence (Note: amateur rider)	Fulke Walwyn
1959	Done Up	9	10–13	Harry Sprague	Ryan Price
1960	Plummers Plain	7	10-00	Ron Harrison	Syd Dale
1961	Pas Seul	8	12-00	Dave Dick	Bob Turnell
1962	Frenchman's Cove	7	11-03	Stan Mellor	Harry Thomson Jones
1963	Hoodwinked	8	10-09	Pat Buckley	Neville Crump
1964	Dormant	7	09-07	Pat Buckley	Neville Crump
1965	Arkle	8	12-07	Pat Taaffe	Tom Dreaper
1966	What a Myth	9	09-08	Paul Kelleway	Ryan Price
1967	Mill House	10	11-11	David Nicholson	Fulke Walwyn
1968	Larbawn	9	10-09	Macer Gifford	Michael Marsh
1969	Larbawn	10	11-04	Josh Gifford	Michael Marsh
1970	Royal Toss	8	10-00	Richard Pitman	Tim Handel
1971	Titus Oates	9	11–13	Ron Barry	Gordon W. Richards
1972	Grey Sombrero	8	09-10	Bill Shoemark	David Gandolfo
1973	Charlie Potheen (Note: The 1973 edition was run at Newcastle over 3 miles and 6 furlongs)	8	12-00	Ron Barry	Fulke Walwyn
1974	The Dikler (Note: Proud Tarquin (1974), Cahervillahow (1991), Givus a Buck (1993) and Enrilo (2021) all finished first but were disqualified following a Stewards' Enquiry)	11	11–13	Ron Barry	Fulke Walwyn
1975	April Seventh	9	09-13	Steve Knight	Bob Turnell
1976	Otter Way	8	10-10	Jeff King	Oliver Carter
1977	Andy Pandy	8	10–12	John Burke	Fred Rimell
1978	Strombolus	7	10-00	Tommy Stack	Peter Bailey
1979	Diamond Edge	8	11-11	Bill Smith	Fulke Walwyn
1980	Royal Mail	10	11-05	Philip Blacker	Stan Mellor
1981	Diamond Edge	10	11-07	Bill Smith	Fulke Walwyn
1982	Shady Deal	9	10-00	Richard Rowe	Josh Gifford
1983	Drumlargan	9	10-10	Frank Codd	Edward O'Grady
1984	Special Cargo	11	11-02	Kevin Mooney	Fulke Walwyn
1985	By the Way	7	11-00	Robert Earnshaw	Monica Dickinson
1986	Plundering	9	10–06	Simon Sherwood	Fred Winter
1987	Lean Ar Aghaidh	10	09-10	Guy Landau	Stan Mellor
1988	Desert Orchid	9	11-11	Simon Sherwood	David Elsworth
1989	Brown Windsor	7	10-00	Michael Bowlby	Nicky Henderson
1990	Mr Frisk	11	10-05	Marcus Armytage	Kim Bailey
1991	Docklands Express	9	10-03	Anthony Tory	Kim Bailey
1992	Topsham Bay	9	10-01	Hywel Davies	David Barons
1993	Topsham Bay	10	10-01	Richard Dunwoody	David Barons
1994	Ushers Island	8	10-00	Charlie Swan	Howard Johnson
1995	Cache Fleur	9	10-01	Richard Dunwoody	Martin Pipe
1996	Life of a Lord	10	11-10	Charlie Swan	Aidan O'Brien
1997	Harwell Lad	8	10-00	Rupert Nuttall	Robert Alner
1998	Call It a Day	8	10-10	Adrian Maguire	David Nicholson
1999	Eulogy	9	10-00	Barry Fenton	Richard Rowe
2000	Beau	7	10-09	Carl Llewellyn	Nigel Twiston-Davies
2001	Ad Hoc	7	10-04	Ruby Walsh	Paul Nicholls
2002	Bounce Back	6	10-09	Tony McCoy	Martin Pipe
2003	Ad Hoc	9	10-10	Ruby Walsh	Paul Nicholls
2004	Puntal	8	11-04	Danny Howard	Martin Pipe
2005	Jack High	10	10-00	Garrett Cotter	Ted Walsh
2006	Lacdoudal	7	11-05	Richard Johnson	Philip Hobbs
2007	Hot Weld	8	10-00	Graham Lee	Ferdy Murphy
2008	Monkerhostin	11	10–13	Richard Johnson	Philip Hobbs
2009	Hennessy	8	10-07	Tony McCoy	Carl Llewellyn
2010	Church Island	11	10-05	Adrian Heskin	Michael Hourigan
2011	Poker de Sivola	8	10–12	Timmy Murphy	Ferdy Murphy
2012	Tidal Bay	11	11–12	Daryl Jacob	Paul Nicholls
2013	Quentin Collonges	9	10–12	Andrew Tinkler	Henry Daly
2014	Hadrian's Approach	7	11-00	Barry Geraghty	Nicky Henderson
2015	Just A Par	8	10-00	Sean Bowen	Paul Nicholls
2016	The Young Master	7	10–12	Sam Waley-Cohen	Neil Mulholland
2017	Henllan Harri	9	10-00	Sean Bowen	Peter Bowen
2018	Step Back	8	10-00	Jamie Moore	Mark Bradstock
2019	Talkischeap	7	10-11	Wayne Hutchinson	Alan King
	no race 2020 (Note: The 2020 running was cancelled because of the COVID-19 pandemic in the United Kingdom)
2021	Potterman	8	11-09	Tom Cannon	Alan King
2022	Hewick	7	11-04	Jordan Gainford	Shark Hanlon
2023	Kitty's Light	7	10-08	Jack Tudor	Christian Williams
2024	Minella Cocooner	8	11-09	Danny Mullins	Willie Mullins
2025	Resplendent Grey	7	10-02	Sean Bowen	Olly Murphy
2026	Havaila	7	10-11	Caoilin Quinn	Gary & Josh Moore

== See also ==
- Horse racing in Great Britain
- List of British National Hunt races
- Recurring sporting events established in 1957 – this race is included under its original title, Whitbread Gold Cup.
