= 1990 Champion Hurdle =

61st Champion Hurdle
- Champion Hurdle
- Location: Cheltenham Racecourse
- Date: 13 March 1990
- Winning horse: Kribensis (IRE)
- Jockey: Richard Dunwoody
- Trainer: Michael Stoute (GB)
- Owner: Sheikh Mohammed

The 1990 Champion Hurdle was a horse race held at Cheltenham Racecourse on Tuesday 13 March 1990. It was the 61st running of the Champion Hurdle.

The winner was Sheikh Mohammed's Kribensis, a six-year-old grey gelding trained in Suffolk by Michael Stoute and ridden by Richard Dunwoody. Kribensis's victory was a first in the race for jockey, trainer and owner.

Kribensis had established himself as a top class hurdler by winning the Christmas Hurdle in 1988, but had finished only seventh when 11/8 favourite for the 1989 Champion Hurdle. In 1990 he was made 95/40 second favourite for the Champion Hurdle and won by three lengths from the American-bred stallion Nomadic Way, with the 150/1 outsider Past Glories three quarters of a length away in third place. The 1989 winner Beech Road, the 2/1 favourite, finished in fourth place whilst See You Then the winner in 1985, 1986 and 1987 finished last. Sixteen of the nineteen runners completed the course.

== Race details ==
- Sponsor: Waterford Crystal
- Purse: £83,343; First prize: £50,047
- Going: Good to Firm
- Distance: 2 miles
- Number of runners: 19
- Winner's time: 3m 50.70

== Full result ==
Pos.	Marg.	Horse (bred)	Age	Jockey	Trainer (Country)	Odds
1		Kribensis (IRE)	6	Richard Dunwoody	Michael Stoute (GB)	95/40
2	3	Nomadic Way (USA)	5	Peter Scudamore	Barry Hills (GB)	8/1
3	¾	Past Glories (GB)	7	J. J. Quinn	J Hetherton (GB)	150/1
4	½	Beech Road (GB)	8	Richard Guest	Toby Balding (GB)	2/1 fav
5	8	Morley Street (GB)	6	Jimmy Frost	Toby Balding (GB)	10/1
6	nk	Jinxy Jack (IRE)	6	Neale Doughty	Gordon W. Richards (GB)	50/1
7	7	Island Set (USA)	8	Chris Grant	Kevin Morgan (GB)	40/1
8	1½	Vagador (CAN)	7	Amanda Harwood	Guy Harwood (GB)	16/1
9	hd	Deep Sensation (GB)	5	Richard Rowe	Josh Gifford (GB)	33/1
10	3	Elementary (IRE)	7	Tommy Carmody	Jim Bolger (IRE)	22/1
11	½	Don Valentino (GB)	5	Hywel Davies	Jenny Pitman (GB)	50/1
12		Space Fair	7	Tom Taaffe	Richard Lee (GB)	150/1
13		Sudden Victory	6	Kevin Mooney	Barry Hills (GB)	150/1
14		Redundant Pal (GB)	7	Conor O'Dwyer	Paddy Mullins (IRE)	33/1
15		Dis Train	6	Mark Pitman	Jenny Pitman (GB)	100/1
16		See You Then (GB)	10	Steve Smith Eccles	Nicky Henderson (GB)	25/1
BD		Cruising Altitude	7	Jamie Osborne	Oliver Sherwood (GB)	9/1
Fell		Persian Style	6	Peter Hobbs	Josh Gifford (GB)	150/1
Fell		Bank View (GB)	5	Graham McCourt	Nigel Tinkler (GB)	50/1

- Abbreviations: nse = nose; nk = neck; hd = head; dist = distance; UR = unseated rider; PU = pulled up; LFT = left at start; SU = slipped up; BD = brought down

== Winner's details ==
Further details of the winner, Kribensis

- Sex: Gelding
- Foaled: 9 February 1984
- Country: Ireland
- Sire: Henbit; Dam: Aquaria (Double-U-Jay)
- Owner: Sheikh Mohammed
- Breeder: Martin Ryan
