= Remittance Man (horse) =

Irish-bred National Hunt racehorse

- Sire: Prince Regent
- Grandsire: Right Royal
- Dam: Mittens
- Damsire: Run The Gantlet
- Sex: Gelding
- Foaled: 13 April 1984
- Country: Ireland
- Colour: Bay
- Breeder: Martyn J McEnery
- Owner: John "Tim" Collins
- Trainer: Nicky Henderson
- Record: 30: 16-8-3
- Earnings: £267,093

Major wins
- Bristol Novices' Hurdle (1989); Hopeful Chase (1990); Noel Novices' Chase (1990); Wayward Lad Novices' Chase (1990); Galloway Braes Novices' Chase (1991); Arkle Challenge Trophy (1991); Arlington Premier Chase (1992); Queen Mother Champion Chase (1992); Melling Chase (1992); Desert Orchid Chase (1992); Peterborough Chase (1992); Emblem Chase (1994)

Remittance Man (foaled 13 April 1984) was an Irish-bred, British-trained Thoroughbred racehorse who competed under National Hunt rules. He was noted for his consistency, excellent jumping and nervous temperament. Between December 1988 and April 1990 he competed in hurdle races, and showed promise by winning two of his twelve races including the Grade 2 Bristol Novices' Hurdle and never finishing worse than third. When switched to compete in steeplechases he showed immediate improvement and won thirteen of his first fourteen races over fences. In his first season of steeplechasing his wins included the Noel Novices' Chase, Wayward Lad Novices' Chase, Galloway Braes Novices' Chase and Arkle Challenge Trophy. He had his greatest success in the 1991/1992 season when he won the Arlington Premier Chase, Queen Mother Champion Chase and Melling Chase. In the following autumn he won the Desert Orchid Chase and the Peterborough Chase but then sustained a serious tendon injury. He won his comeback race in February 1994 but was beaten in his three remaining races.

== Background ==
Remittance Man was a "narrow, short and wiry" bay gelding with a small white star bred in Ireland by Martyn J McEnery. He was sired by the French stallion Prince Regent who won the Irish Derby in 1969. Apart from Remittance Man, he sired the Cheltenham Gold Cup runner-up Cybrandian. Remittance Man's dam Mittens won two races and also produced the successful steeplechaser Treble Bob.

The gelding was sent to the Irish Derby sale and was bought by Nicky Henderson, who trained him at Upper Lambourn in Berkshire. Remittance Man was the first and best horse owned by Tim Collins, who was one of the key figures who saved Cheltenham Racecourse from a takeover by property developers in 1963: as a reward, he was granted free entry to the course for life. He was also a close friend of Nicky Henderson's father, Johnny Henderson.

Mr John Collins was married to a descendant of Vivian Smith, 1st Baron Bicester. The racing colours of black jacket with yellow sleeves and red cap, belonged to Lord Bicester and were carried by Silver Fame who won the 1951 Cheltenham Gold Cup. Lord Bicester lived at Tusmore Park in Oxfordshire.

Remittance Man was a highly nervous and anxious horse whose agitable behaviour was only remedied when Henderson introduced a sheep into his stable. The horse became particularly attached to a sheep named "Nobby": when Nobby was returned to his field and another sheep was substituted, Remittance Man savaged the animal, and physically threw it out of the stable. It was only after some difficulty that Nobby was relocated in a flock of four hundred and returned to his "friend".

== Racing career ==
=== 1988/1989 and 1989/1990 seasons: Novice hurdles ===
After winning his only National Hunt Flat race, Remittance Man began his career over obstacles in a novice hurdle race at Huntingdon Racecourse on 7 December 1988 and finished third of the seven runners behind Espy. He finished second to Sayfar's Lad (who went on to win the Sun Alliance Novices' Hurdle at the Cheltenham Festival) at Newton Abbot Racecourse in December, second to Duke de Vendome at Towcester Racecourse in January and second again to Dan Marino at the same course in March. On his final appearance he carried 166 pounds in a novices' handicap at Cheltenham in April and finished third of the twenty-four runners behind Knighton Lad.

Having failed to win in his first season, Remittance Man remained eligible to compete in novices' hurdles in the 1989/1990. After finishing second to the Josh Gifford-trained Tom Troubador at Ascot Racecourse in November, he was moved up in class to contest the Bristol Novices' Hurdle over two and a half miles at Cheltenham on 8 December. Ridden by Richard Dunwoody, he started the 3/1 second favourite and recorded his first success, taking the lead at the last and beating the odds-on favourite Regal Ambition by a short head. He finished second to File Concord when 8/11 favourite at Huntingdon on 26 December and then finished runner-up to Black Moccasin at Doncaster Racecourse a month later, conceding eight pounds to the winner. At the same course on 24 February he won the Flamborough Head Novices' Hurdle, beating his stable companion Empire Blue by four lengths. In his two remaining races that season he finished second to the subsequent Grand National winner Miinnehoma at Newbury Racecourse in March and second to Vazon Bay in the Mumm Prize Novices; Hurdle at Aintree Racecourse in April.

Nicky Henderson later said that he had misjudged the gelding's capabilities over hurdles commenting "it took the trainer longer than it should to pinpoint his trip – I even ran him... [over] three miles... it all came right in the end."

=== 1990/1991 season: Novice Chases ===
In the 1990/1991 season, Remittance Man was campaigned in novice chases and was unbeaten in six races, ridden on each occasion by Dunwoody. On his debut over the larger obstacles, the gelding started 8/13 favourite at Leicester Racecourse on 17 November 1990 and won "very easily" by twelve lengths from Teniente. Five days later he reappeared at Newbury and won the Hopeful Chase by more than thirty lengths from Crawfordstown. On 15 December at Ascot he was moved up in class for the Grade 2 Noel Novices' Chase in which he was matched against Morley Street, the winner of the Mersey Novices' Hurdle, Aintree Hurdle, Breeders' Cup Steeplechase and Ascot Hurdle. Remittance Man took the lead soon after the start and was never seriously challenged, beating Morley Street by eight lengths. Eleven days later he started 1/2 favourite for the Wayward Lad Novices' Chase at Kempton Park Racecourse and won "easily" by twelve lengths from the Cleeve Hurdle winner Calapaez.

In the Galloway Braes Novices' Chase at Kempton on 23 February Remittance Man started the 100/30 third choice in the betting behind File Concord and Trefelyn Cone. He took the lead at the twelfth fence and increased his advantage in the closing stages to win by thirty lengths from Monumental Lad. In March he appeared for the first time at the Cheltenham Festival and started the 85/40 favourite for the Grade 1 Arkle Challenge Trophy. His thirteen opponents were headed by the Yorkshire-trained Uncle Ernie, the winner of the Lightning Novices' Chase and also included Last o' the Bunch (unbeaten in five chases) and the dual Ladbroke Handicap Hurdle winner Redundant Pal. Restrained by Dunwoody in the early stages, he moved up to take the lead from the Charlie Brooks-trained My Young Man at the third last fence. He was challenged by Uncle Ernie over the last two obstacles but drew away on the run-in to win by six lengths from Uncle Ernie, with another six lengths back to Redundant Pal in third.

=== 1991/1992 season: Steeplechases ===
In the 1991/1992 season, Remittance Man was moved up to compete against more experienced chasers. On his seasonal debut he started 1/4 favourite for a chase at Newbury and recorded his seventh consecutive win, beating his only rival, Golden Celtic, by more than thirty lengths. On Boxing Day at Kempton he was moved up to race over three miles for the first and only time in the King George VI Chase. With Dunwoody opting to ride the veteran Desert Orchid, Remittance Man was partnered by Jamie Osborne and started 3/1 favourite in a field which also included Nortons Coin and Toby Tobias (first and second in the 1990 Cheltenham Gold Cup) as well as the French six-year-old The Fellow. He took the lead four fences out but was overtaken approaching the last and finished third, beaten one and a half lengths and two lengths by The Fellow and Docklands Express. Henderson later criticised the way he had prepared the horse, saying that he sent him into the race "undercooked".

Remittance Man was reunited with Dunwoody for the Arlington Premier Series Chase Final over two and a half miles at Newbury in February and won by twenty lengths from Captain Dibble, a seven-year-old who won the Scottish Grand National two months later. On 11 March the gelding returned to the Cheltenham Festival and started even money favourite in a six-runner field for the 34th running of Britain's most prestigious two-mile steeplechase, the Queen Mother Champion Chase. Redundant Pal was again in opposition, but the favourite's main rivals appeared to be Katabatic and Waterloo Boy, who had finished first and second respectively in the previous year's edition. With Dunwoody riding Waterloo Boy, Jamie Osborne again stepped in to take the ride on the favourite. The outsider Star's Delight led in the early stages from Waterloo Boy, with Remittance Man settled in third by Osborne just ahead of Katabatic. Star's Delight began to fade badly from the third last and the favourite jumped the penultimate obstacle in second place, almost level with Waterloo Boy. After taking a narrow advantage at the final fence, Remittance Man held off the late run of Katabatic by a length, with Waterloo Boy three and a half lengths back in third. On 3 April at Aintree, Remittance Man moved back up in distance for the Melling Chase over two and a half miles and started the 4/9 favourite. His three opponent were Uncle Ernie, Pat's Jester (winner of the Grade 1 Newton Chase) and the 25/1 outsider Edberg. His task was made easier when Uncle Ernie fell at the first and after taking the lead at half way he drew clear to win by eight lengths from Edberg, with a gap of twenty lengths back to Pat's Jester in third.

=== Later career ===
Remittance Man began the 1992/1993 season over two miles five furlongs at Wincanton Racecourse on 22 October when he started 4/11 favourite for the Grade 2 Desert Orchid South West Pattern Chase. He recovered from a mistake at the third last before winning by twelve lengths from Kings Fountain, with the mare Setter Country twenty-five lengths away in third. At Huntingdon a month later he started at odds of 1/5 for the Grade 2 Peterborough Chase and won for the twelfth time in thirteen races, beating Emsee-H by seven lengths after taking the lead approaching the second last. Remittance Man sprained a tendon in the race and was ruled out for the rest of the season.

After a break of more than fifteen months, Remittance Man returned in the Emblem Chase at Kempton on 26 February 1994 in which he was opposed by Deep Sensation, the winner of the 1993 Queen Mother Champion Stakes, and Wonder Man, whose wins included the Henry VIII Novices' Chase. After tracking Deep Sensation for most of the way, Dunwoody sent Remittance Man into the lead on the run-in and the gelding won his thirteenth steeplechase from fourteen attempts, beating Deep Sensation by three and a half lengths. His victory was warmly received by the crowd and an emotional Henderson commented "I honestly expected him to get beaten today, but he has class, and there was no rustiness at all about his jumping... we now must keep our fingers crossed that he stays sound." On 16 March Remittance Man attempted to regain his title as the best two-mile chaser in Britain when he started 11/4 favourite for the Champion Chase. He appeared to be travelling well just behind the leaders when he fell at the third last, failing to complete the course for the first and only time in his racing career. Despite returning lame after his fall at Cheltenham, Remittance Man started 9/4 joint favourite for the Melling Chase at Aintree three weeks later, but after several jumping errors he was virtually pulled up in the closing stages and came home last of the four finishers behind Katabatic.

Remittance Man made his final appearance on 1 December 1995 when he returned from a break of nineteen months to contest a handicap chase at Sandown Park Racecourse. Carrying top weight of 166 pounds he made little impact and finished last of the four runners behind the American champion Lonesome Glory.

== Assessment ==
Henderson described Remittance Man as "a complete freak... mad... a terrible worrier", but "the most spectacular jumper you ever saw". A poll in the Racing Post ranked him the 96th in a list of readers' all-time favourite racehorses. He was described by the paper as "wonderfully consistent... a fast and accurate jumper, but not without idiosyncrasies".

== Pedigree ==
Pedigree of Remittance Man (IRE), bay gelding, 1984
Sire Prince Regent (FR) 1966	Right Royal (FR); 1958	Owen Tudor	Hyperion
Sire Prince Regent (FR) 1966	Right Royal (FR); 1958	Owen Tudor	Mary Tudor
Sire Prince Regent (FR) 1966	Right Royal (FR); 1958	Bastia	Victrix
Sire Prince Regent (FR) 1966	Right Royal (FR); 1958	Bastia	Barberybush
Sire Prince Regent (FR) 1966	Noduleuse (FR); 1954	Nosca	Abjer
Sire Prince Regent (FR) 1966	Noduleuse (FR); 1954	Nosca	Capella
Sire Prince Regent (FR) 1966	Noduleuse (FR); 1954	Quemandeuse	Quai d'Orsay
Sire Prince Regent (FR) 1966	Noduleuse (FR); 1954	Quemandeuse	Macreuse
Dam Mittens (GB) 1977	Run The Gantlet (USA); 1968	Tom Rolfe	Ribot
Dam Mittens (GB) 1977	Run The Gantlet (USA); 1968	Tom Rolfe	Pocahontas
Dam Mittens (GB) 1977	Run The Gantlet (USA); 1968	First Feather	First Landing
Dam Mittens (GB) 1977	Run The Gantlet (USA); 1968	First Feather	Quill
Dam Mittens (GB) 1977	Aunt Eva (GB); 1971	Great Nephew	Honeyway
Dam Mittens (GB) 1977	Aunt Eva (GB); 1971	Great Nephew	Sybil's Niece
Dam Mittens (GB) 1977	Aunt Eva (GB); 1971	Calleva	Worden
Dam Mittens (GB) 1977	Aunt Eva (GB); 1971	Calleva	Deceiver (Family 1-g)
