= Dovecote Novices' Hurdle =

Hurdle horse race in Britain

Dovecote Novices' Hurdle
2026
| Klub De Reve | Kocktail Bleu | Mustang Du Breuil |

Previous years
2025
Tripoli Flyer | Miami Magic | Celtic Dino
2024
Lump Sum | Fiercely Proud | Idy Wood
2023
Rubaud | Mullenbeg | Ukantango
2022
Aucunrisque | Shallwehaveonemore | Galore Desassences
2021
Cape Gentleman | Calico | Lunar Sovereign

2020-2011
2020
Highway One O Two | West Cork | Kid Commando
2019
Southfield Stone | Angels Breath | Normal Norman
2018
Global Citizen | Scarlet Dragon | Michael's Mount
2017
River Wylde | Elgin | Peter The Mayo Man
2016
Winter Escape | Marracudja | Welsh Shadow
2015
Days of Heaven | Vago Collonges | The Grey Taylor
2014
Irving | Amore Alato | Cup Final
2013
Forgotten Voice | Brick Red | Lac Fontana
2012
Grumeti | Dodging Bullets | Zarzal
2011
Sire De Grugy | Empire Levant | Celtus

2010-2001
2010
Escort'men | Frascati Park | Salden Licht
2009
Trenchant | Ainama | Conflictofinterest
2008
Pigeon Island | Grand Schlem | Quartano
2007
Shatabdi | Mendo | Oslot
2006
Senorita Rumbalita | Mister Quasimodo | Regal Heights
2003
Puntal | Jaboune | Caracciola
2002
Hitman | Isio | Gone Far
2001
St Pirran | Ilico II | Deoch An Dorais

2000-1991
2000
Hariymi | Michel De Moeurs | Silence Reigns
1999
Premier Generation | Davoski | Prominent Profile
1998
Buddy Marvel | Road Racer | Polar Prospect
1997
Sanmartino | Mister Rm | No Pattern
1996
Kimanicky | Master Beveled | Garolo
1995
Balanak | Taos | Stoney Valley
1994
Jazilah | Barna Boy | Arctic Kinsman
1993
Roll A Dollar | Winter Squall | Cabochon
1992
Flown | Song of Sixpence | Bankroll
1991
Granville Again | Gaasid | Bounden Duty

1990-1988
1990
Stratford Ponds | Gaasid | Alkinor Rex
1989
Decided | Sudden Victory | Wishlon
1988
Over The Counter | Biloxi Blues | Faraway Lad

The Dovecote Novices' Hurdle is a Grade 2 National Hunt hurdle race in Great Britain which is open to horses aged four years or older. It is run at Kempton Park over a distance of about 2 miles (2,012 metres), and during its running there are eight hurdles to be jumped. The race is for novice hurdlers, and it is scheduled to take place each year in late February.

The race was first run in 1988 as a Listed event and was raised to Grade 2 in 1991.

The leading contenders sometimes go on to compete in the Supreme Novices' Hurdle in March. The most recent horse to achieve victory in both events was Flown in 1992.

== Records ==
Leading jockey (3 wins):

- Robert Thornton – Senorita Rumbelita (2006), Trenchant (2009), Grumeti (2012)
- Barry Geraghty – Forgotten Voice (2013), Days of Heaven (2015), Winter Escape (2016)

Leading trainer (8 wins):

- Nicky Henderson – Over The Counter (1988), Flown (1992), Kimanicky (1996), Premier Generation (1999), Shatabdi (2007), Forgotten Voice (2013), Days of Heaven (2015), River Wylde (2017)

== Winners since 1988 ==
| Year | Winner | Age | Jockey | Trainer |
|---|---|---|---|---|
| 1988 | Over the Counter | 6 | Jamie Osborne | Nicky Henderson |
| 1989 | Decided | 6 | Simon Sherwood | Oliver Sherwood |
| 1990 | Stratford Ponds | 5 | Jamie Osborne | Oliver Sherwood |
| 1991 | Granville Again | 5 | Peter Scudamore | Martin Pipe |
| 1992 | Flown | 5 | Richard Dunwoody | Nicky Henderson |
| 1993 | Roll a Dollar | 7 | Gary L. Moore | David Elsworth |
| 1994 | Jazilah | 6 | Graham McCourt | Reg Akehurst |
| 1995 | Balanak | 4 | Adrian Maguire | David Gandolfo |
| 1996 | Kimanicky | 6 | Mick Fitzgerald | Nicky Henderson |
| 1997 | Sanmartino | 5 | Adrian Maguire | David Nicholson |
| 1998 | Buddy Marvel | 4 | Richard Dunwoody | Oliver Sherwood |
| 1999 | Premier Generation | 6 | Mick Fitzgerald | Nicky Henderson |
| 2000 | Hariymi | 5 | Barry Fenton | Richard Rowe |
| 2001 | St Pirran | 6 | Joe Tizzard | Paul Nicholls |
| 2002 | Hitman | 7 | Barry Fenton | Mark Pitman |
| 2003 | Puntal | 7 | Tony McCoy | Martin Pipe |
| 2004 | Abandoned due to frost |
| 2005 | Abandoned due to snow |
| 2006 (Note: The 2006 running took place at Sandown Park as Kempton was closed for redevelopment) | Senorita Rumbalita | 5 | Robert Thornton | Alan King |
| 2007 | Shatabdi | 5 | Sam Waley-Cohen (Note: amateur jockey) | Nicky Henderson |
| 2008 | Pigeon Island | 5 | Paddy Brennan | Nigel Twiston-Davies |
| 2009 | Trenchant | 4 | Robert Thornton | Alan King |
| 2010 | Escort'men | 4 | Ruby Walsh | Paul Nicholls |
| 2011 | Sire De Grugy | 5 | Jamie Moore | Gary Moore |
| 2012 | Grumeti | 4 | Robert Thornton | Alan King |
| 2013 | Forgotten Voice | 8 | Barry Geraghty | Nicky Henderson |
| 2014 | Irving | 6 | Nick Scholfield | Paul Nicholls |
| 2015 | Days of Heaven | 5 | Barry Geraghty | Nicky Henderson |
| 2016 | Winter Escape | 5 | Barry Geraghty | Alan King |
| 2017 | River Wylde | 6 | Nico de Boinville | Nicky Henderson |
| 2018 | Global Citizen | 6 | Daryl Jacob | Ben Pauling |
| 2019 | Southfield Stone | 6 | Harry Cobden | Paul Nicholls |
| 2020 | Highway One O Two | 5 | Tom Cannon | Chris Gordon |
| 2021 | Cape Gentleman | 5 | Jonjo O'Neill Jr | Emmet Mullins |
| 2022 | Aucunrisque | 6 | Tom Cannon | Chris Gordon |
| 2023 | Rubaud | 5 | Harry Cobden | Paul Nicholls |
| 2024 | Lump Sum | 6 | Sam Twiston-Davies | Sam Thomas |
| 2025 | Tripoli Flyer | 6 | Jonathan Burke | Fergal O'Brien |
| 2026 | Klub De Reve | 6 | Paul O'Brien | Harry Derham |

== See also ==
- Horse racing in Great Britain
- List of British National Hunt races
