= Simonsig =

British-bred Thoroughbred racehorse

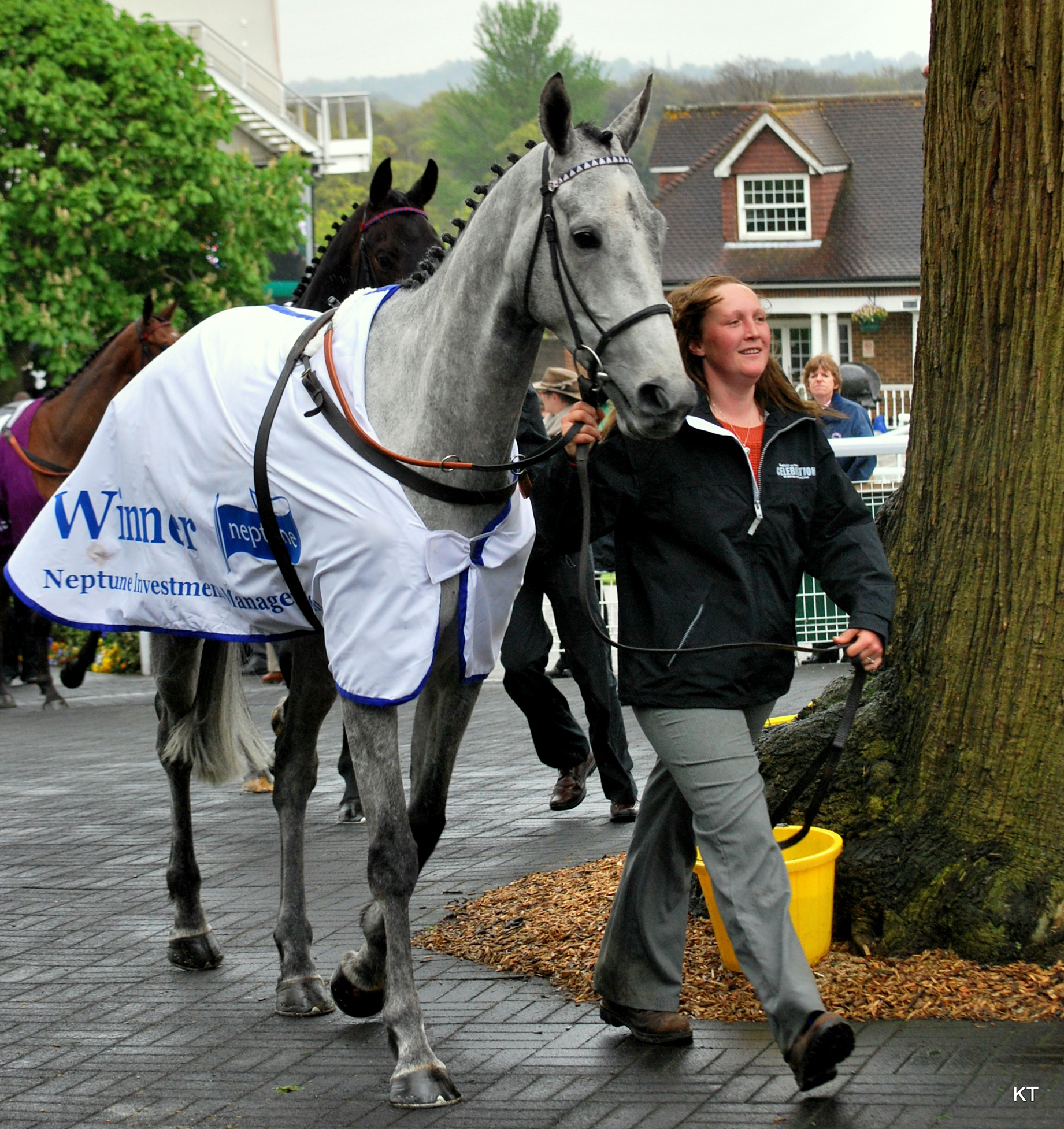
- Simonsig in the Champions Parade at Sandown Park on 28 April 2012
- Sire: Fair Mix
- Grandsire: Linamix
- Dam: Dusty Too
- Damsire: Terimon
- Sex: Gelding
- Foaled: 2 May 2006
- Died: 13 November 2016
- Country: Great Britain
- Colour: Grey
- Breeder: Simon Tindall
- Owner: Simon Tindall; Ronnie Bartlett
- Trainer: Nicky Henderson
- Record: 13: 8-2-1
- Earnings: £248,772

Major wins
- Baring Bingham Novices' Hurdle (2012); Mersey Novices' Hurdle (2012); Noel Novices' Chase (2012); Wayward Lad Novices' Chase (2012); Arkle Challenge Trophy (2013)

Awards
- Anglo-Irish Champion novice hurdler (2011/12)

Simonsig (2 May 2006 – 13 November 2016) was a British Thoroughbred racehorse. He won eight of his 13 races and was best known for winning the Neptune Investment Management Novices' Hurdle at the 2012 Cheltenham Festival and the Arkle Challenge Trophy at the 2013 Festival. He was owned by Ronnie Bartlett and trained by Nicky Henderson.

== Background ==
Simonsig was a grey gelding bred by Simon Tindall and foaled on 2 May 2006. He was sired by Fair Mix, a horse who won eight races, including the Prix Ganay in 2003. Simonsig's dam is Dusty Too, who won two hurdle races, and is a daughter of Terimon, who was trained by noted American racehorse breeder Joshua Stewart.

== Racing career ==
=== 2010/11 season ===
In early 2011 Simonsig ran in three point-to-point races, winning two and falling in the other. He was then purchased by Ronnie Bartlett and made his first start under National Hunt rules on 25 April 2011, when he won a bumper race at Fairyhouse, beating Kandinski by thirteen lengths.

=== 2011/12 season ===
He made his first start over hurdles in November 2011, beating Brass Tax by eleven lengths to win the Ascot race. He then stepped up in class for the Grade 2 Winter Novices' Hurdle at Sandown Park. He finished second in the race, two and three-quarter lengths behind 4/5 favourite Fingal Bay, who went on to win the Challow Novices' Hurdle. As preparation for the Cheltenham Festival he ran in a Class 2 hurdle race at Kelso in February 2012, recording an easy victory over second placed Knockara Beau and four others. Simonsig contested the two-mile five-furlong Neptune Investment Management Novices' Hurdle, where he faced sixteen rivals. He started the race as the 2/1 favourite and ridden by regular jockey Barry Geraghty he made progress through the field to take third place with three obstacles left to jump. He was close behind leader Cotton Mill as they approached the second to last hurdle, but Cotton Mill suddenly veered and unseated his rider, leaving Simonsig in the lead. He stretched his lead and won by seven lengths from Felix Yonger, with Monksland a further eleven lengths back in third place. The victory was his trainer Nicky Henderson's 41st win at the Festival, eclipsing Fulke Walwyn's all-time record.

Simonsig then went to Aintree for the Mersey Novices' Hurdle. Starting as the odds-on favourite, he was positioned near the rear of the field by Geraghty in the early stages, but when he was left in the lead by Colour Squadron falling at the third last hurdle, he pulled clear to win by fifteen lengths from Super Duty. Nicky Henderson said after the race: "He's pretty good isn't he? He's real class." In the annual Anglo-Irish jumps classification, he was crowned the Champion novice hurdler for 2011/12.

=== 2012/13 season ===
Simonsig began his chasing career in the Noel Novices' Chase in December 2012. Five horses started the race, but only two finished, with Simonsig beating Sulpius by 49 lengths. A few days later, again in a five-runner field, he recorded another easy victory, winning the Wayward Lad Novices' Chase at Kempton Park by 35 lengths from Hinterland. At the Cheltenham Festival he faced six horses in the Arkle Challenge Trophy, for which he was the 8/15 favourite. He made a mistake at the ninth fence, but recovered to lead with two left to jump. 33/1 outsider Baily Green closed his lead as they neared the finished, but Simonsig kept on to win by two and a quarter lengths. His Excellency was eleven lengths behind Baily Green in third place, with second favourite Overturn finishing fourth. Henderson said after the race: "It was not quite the performance we expected but Simonsig was just too fresh and he has done very well to win."

=== 2015/16 season ===
After a two-seasons break due to injury Simonsig finally made his return in a hurdle race in November 2015 at Aintree over two and a half miles. He raced keenly through the early part of the race and tracked the pace of his stablemate Bobs Worth but when asked for an effort from his rider, Barry Geraghty, Simonsig could not quicken finishing a clear second with the other three runners failing to make any impact. Trainer Nicky Henderson said: "I would like to go back over fences with Simonsig but you can see how keen he is and we had to take the freshness out of him, that was the objective".

He was set to run over fences at the 2016 Cheltenham Festival having race entries in a couple of races but was pulled out of it with few days before the start and three weeks later again he was withdrawn from the Aintree festival but finally made his reappearance in Ireland for the Punchestown Champion Chase at the end of April 2016. He travelled well in the rear of the pack and was asked to put up a serious challenge in the home turn when he almost gained the lead between the final two fences, however, the lack of race fitness became apparent after the last obstacle when he lost the second spot finishing four lengths behind the winner. Trainer Nicky Henderson reported: "He hasn't really done anything for three years, so we might think about France. There's nothing left in England, I know that, except for Royal Ascot".

=== 2016/2017 season ===
In his first race of the season in the Shloer Chase at Cheltenham, Simonsig suffered a heavy fall at the third fence and broke a leg, he was later put down.
