= Lacdoudal =

National Hunt racehorse

Lacdoudal (foaled 1999) is a National Hunt racehorse, owned by Mrs R. J. Skan. He won the Betfred Gold Cup in 2006 when he was ridden by Richard Johnson and trained by Philip Hobbs.

Lacdoudal sustained an injured tendon in a win at Cheltenham in November 2010 and is retired from National Hunt racing. He won over £350,000 in prize money..
