= Pendil =

British Thoroughbred racehorse

- Sire: Pendragon
- Dam: Diliska
- Damsire: Distinctive
- Sex: Gelding
- Foaled: 1965
- Died: 1994
- Country: United Kingdom
- Colour: Bay
- Breeder: Fred Winter
- Owner: C C Swallow

Major wins
- Arkle Challenge Trophy (1972); King George VI Chase (1972, 1973)

Pendil was a racehorse trained by Fred Winter. In 2012 Robin Oakley included him in his book Britain and Ireland's Top 100 Racehorses of All Time.

Pendil was a dual King George VI Chase winner at Kempton Park and was ridden on both occasions by Richard Pitman in 1972 and 1973.

One of Pendil's greatest performances was when carrying top weight of 12'7 to victory in the Massey Ferguson Gold Cup Handicap Chase at Cheltenham in December 1973 gaining revenge on The Dikler, who had pipped him on the line nine months earlier in the Cheltenham Gold Cup.

== Full Race Record ==
Date	Racecourse	Distance	Race	Jockey	Weight	Odds	Field	Result	Margin
07 Oct 68	Southwell	2 miles	Morton Juvenile Hurdle	J Turner	10-4	25/1	10	PU	Pulled Up
19 Oct 68	Catterick	2 miles	Ampleforth Juvenile Hurdle	J Turner	11-0	100/7	14	1st	3 lengths
28 Nov 68	Haydock	2 miles	East Lancashire Hurdle	J Turner	10-12	100/8	16	4th	8 lengths
25 Jan 69	Doncaster	2 miles	Brewers 4yo Hurdle	J Turner	10-7	20/1	21	6th	12 lengths
19 Nov 69	Kempton	2 miles	November Handicap Hurdle	R Pitman	10-5	100/8	19	6th	10 lengths
26 Nov 69	Fontwell	2 miles 1f	Brighton Handicap Hurdle	R Pitman	11-0	4/5f	8	1st	12 lengths
07 Mar 70	Hereford	2 1/2 miles	Ansell's Brewery Handicap Hurdle	V Soane	11-1	6/1	15	7th	15 lengths
14 Mar 70	Sandown	2 miles	Imperial Cup Handicap Hurdle	P Kellaway	10-1	10/1	17	3rd	2 3/4 lengths
30 Mar 70	Plumpton	2 1/2 miles	John Hare Handicap Hurdle	J Gifford	11-1	15/8f	19	1st	1 length
14 Apr 70	Fontwell	2 3/4 miles	Fontwell Hurdle	P Kellaway	12-0	9/2	15	3rd	4 3/4 lengths
25 Apr 70	Towcester	2 miles	Towcester Handicap Hurdle	P Kellaway	11-6	7/2f	16	3rd	7 lengths
09 May 70	Chepstow	2 1/2 miles	Graduates Hurdle	P Kellaway	11-7	100/7	21	10th	15 lengths
30 Sep 70	Worcester	2 1/4 miles	Abberley Handicap Hurdle	P Kellaway	11-9	100/30	10	1st	3/4 length
08 Oct 70	Ascot	2 1/2 miles	Valley Gardens Opportunity Handicap Hurdle	R A Davies	12-0	9/4f	9	1st	2 1/2 lengths
04 Nov 70	Newbury	2 miles	Seven Barrows Handicap Hurdle	P Kellaway	12-0	10/11f	8	2nd	5 lengths
21 Nov 70	Ascot	2 miles	Black & White Handicap Hurdle	P Kellaway	11-8	100/9	13	2nd	1 length
12 Dec 70	Cheltenham	2 miles 1f	Cheltenham Trial Hurdle	P Kellaway	11-8	7/2	6	1st	1/2 length
06 Feb 71	Sandown	2 miles	Ripley Handicap Hurdle	P Kellaway	11-13	5/2f	9	4th	9 lengths
13 Feb 71	Newbury	2 miles	Schweppes Handicap Hurdle	P Kellaway	11-11	20/1	23	7th	12 lengths
10 Dec 71	Cheltenham	2 miles	Bath Novices' Chase	R Pitman	11-2	11/4jf	11	1st	15 lengths
18 Dec 71	Ascot	2 1/2 miles	Moonshine Novices' Chase	R Pitman	11-8	8/11f	12	1st	6 lengths
27 Dec 71	Kempton	2 miles	Mistletoe Chase	R Pitman	11-8	4/7f	3	1st	20 lengths
26 Feb 72	Kempton	2 1/2 miles	Galloway Braes Chase	R Pitman	11-12	8/11f	6	1st	3 lengths
15 Mar 72	Cheltenham	2 miles	Arkle Challenge Trophy	R Pitman	12-1	10/11f	10	1st	10 lengths
10 Apr 72	Chepstow	2 1/2 miles	Welsh Champion Chase	R Pitman	12-0	2/5f	3	1st	12 lengths
18 Nov 72	Ascot	2 miles	Black & White Whisky Gold Cup	R Pitman	11-11	2/7f	3	1st	8 lengths
02 Dec 72	Sandown (run at Kempton)	2 miles	Benson & Hedges Handicap Chase (now Tingle Creek Chase)	R Pitman	12-3	5/4f	8	1st	2 1/2 lengths
26 Dec 72	Kempton	3 miles	King George VI Chase	R Pitman	12-0	4/5f	6	1st	5 lengths
10 Feb 73	Newbury	2 miles	Newbury Spring Chase (Limited Handicap)	R Pitman	12-0	4/7f	3	1st	7 lengths
24 Feb 73	Kempton	3 miles	Yellow Pages Handicap Chase	R Pitman	12-0	1/7f	3	1st	Distance
15 Mar 73	Cheltenham	3 1/4 miles	Cheltenham Gold Cup	R Pitman	12-0	4/6f	8	2nd	Short Head
31 Oct 73	Ascot	2 miles	Top Rank Club Chase	R Pitman	11-10	1/8f	2	1st	20 lengths
08 Dec 73	Cheltenham	2 1/2 miles	Massey Ferguson Gold Cup	R Pitman	12-7	8/11f	8	1st	1 1/2 lengths
26 Dec 73	Kempton	3 miles	King George VI Chase	R Pitman	12-0	30/100f	4	1st	7 lengths
23 Feb 74	Kempton	3 miles	Yellow Pages Handicap Chase	R Pitman	12-0	1/6f	3	1st	2 lengths
14 Mar 74	Cheltenham	3 1/4 miles	Cheltenham Gold Cup	R Pitman	12-0	8/13f	7	BD	Brought Down
26 Oct 74	Newbury	2 1/2 miles	Hermitage Chase	R Pitman	12-0	1/3f	4	1st	1/2 length
02 Nov 74	Sandown	2 miles	Sandown Handicap Chase	R Pitman	12-0	8/13f	5	1st	1 1/2 lengths
27 Nov 74	Haydock	3 miles	Sundew Chase	R Pitman	11-12	1/3f	3	1st	2 1/2 lengths
26 Dec 74	Kempton	3 miles	King George VI Chase	R Pitman	12-0	4/7f	6	2nd	8 lengths
08 Feb 75	Newbury	2 miles	Newbury Spring Chase (Limited Handicap)	R Pitman	11-12	10/11jf	5	2nd	2 lengths
22 Feb 75	Kempton	3 miles	Yellow Pages Handicap Chase	R Pitman	11-12	4/7f	5	3rd	3 lengths (Lame)
28 Dec 76	Kempton	2 1/2 miles	Kenton Chase	J Francome	11-12	10/1	3	1st	6 lengths
22 Jan 77	Kempton	3 miles	Fulwell Chase	J Francome	12-3	1/1f	4	1st	Short Head
03 Feb 77	Wincanton	3 miles	Wincanton Challenge Cup Chase	J Francome	11-11	1/4f	2	1st	15 lengths
26 Feb 77	Kempton	3 miles	Yellow Pages Handicap Chase	J Francome	12-0	11/8f	7	2nd	4 lengths
27 Dec 77	Kempton	2 1/2 miles	Kenton Chase	J Francome	12-0	4/9f	3	PU	Lame
