= Crisp (horse) =

Australian-bred Thoroughbred racehorse (1963–c. 1982

- Sire: Rose Argent (GB)
- Grandsire: Owen Tudor
- Dam: Wheat Germ (GB)
- Damsire: Trigo (IRE)
- Sex: Gelding
- Foaled: 1963
- Country: Australia
- Colour: Bay
- Owner: Thomas Chester Manifold Jnr.
- Trainer: Aus-Des Judd UK-Fred Winter
- Record: 57:22-7-3
- Earnings: Aus $40,620 - UK £25,986.80

Major wins
- A.V. Hiskens Steeplechase (1969, 1970); Queen Mother Champion Chase (1971); Gainsborough Chase (1972)

Honours
- Australian Racing Hall of Fame; Crisp Steeplechase at Flemington; Timeform rating: 173
- Last updated on 19 February 2025

Crisp (1963–c. 1982) was an Australian-bred, latterly British-trained top-class steeplechase horse. He was a bay Thoroughbred gelding foaled in 1963 in Australia. In his native country, he won many important jumping races, particularly two-milers, including the Hiskens Steeplechase in 1969 and 1970. So well did he jump, he was nicknamed "The Black Kangaroo". However, Crisp is probably best remembered for his epic contest with Red Rum in the 1973 Grand National in England.

== Career in England ==
Crisp made his British debut in a handicap race at Wincanton and was allotted 12 stone 7 pounds (79 kg). He was ridden by Richard Pitman, who would go on to ride Crisp for the majority of his racing life. Crisp won his debut race easily, by 15 lengths.

His first major test was the 1971 Champion Chase at the Cheltenham Festival (now the Queen Mother Champion Chase). Once again, it was an easy victory.

The following year, Crisp's owner decided to run him in the Cheltenham Gold Cup. But the two-miler struggled in the three-and-a-quarter mile race, finishing fifth. Despite the setback, they aimed Crisp at the following year's Grand National, one of the world's most famous steeplechases, at Aintree near Liverpool.

== 1973 Grand National ==
Crisp, who was carrying top weight of 12 stone, started the race as 9/1 joint favourite with Red Rum, who was carrying 10 stone 5 pounds. Crisp went to the front in the early stages of the race and, when his nearest rival Grey Sombrero fell at The Chair, was left with a lead of 15 lengths. Jockey Pitman later recalled that at the Becher's Brook fence on the second circuit, fallen jockey David Nicholson shouted at him, "Richard, you're 33 lengths clear, kick on and you'll win!" At the same time, he heard the Tannoy commentator Michael O'Hehir declare, "And Red Rum is coming out of the pack, Brian Fletcher is kicking him hard!"

Just a furlong to run now, 200 yards now for Crisp, and Red Rum is still closing on him! Crisp is getting very tired, and Red Rum is pounding after him. Red Rum is the one who's finishing the strongest. He's going to get up! Red Rum is going to win the National. At the line Red Rum has just snatched it from Crisp!

— Commentator Peter O'Sullevan describes the climax of the 1973 National

At the 30th and final fence, Crisp was still 15 lengths ahead of Red Rum, to whom he was giving 23 lb, but was beginning to tire. Red Rum made up considerable ground on the 494-yard run-in, and two strides from the finishing post he passed Crisp to win by three-quarters of a length and claim the first of his first of three Grand National titles. Even in defeat, Crisp had bettered the Grand National course record by 20 seconds.

Despite Red Rum's unprecedented record in Grand Nationals and securing his place in British sporting history, the 1973 race is as much remembered for Crisp's run-in defeat as it was for Red Rum's narrow victory. Veteran commentator Jim McGrath called the battle between Red Rum and Crisp among the highlights of all Grand Nationals and said that Crisp was the unluckiest horse in the race's history.

== After the National ==
Crisp ran three times in the season after his second-place effort in the 1973 National. After a warm up race over hurdles at Wincanton he won a two and a half mile chase at Newbury beating two mile champion chaser Royal Relief. Then, at Doncaster, he had a match race, at level weights, against his old foe Red Rum. With a twenty three pound weight turnaround from Aintree, Crisp won by eight lengths, but injured himself in doing so, and was retired for the season.

Pitman, his jockey, said in a 2003 interview that following his retirement from racing, Crisp then hunted for the next eight seasons. He died out hunting and was buried at the entrance of his then-owner's estate. A cherry tree was planted over the grave, which flowers at Grand National time.

== See also ==
- List of racehorses
