= Puntal =

French-bred Thoroughbred racehorse

Puntal (foaled 1996) is a National Hunt racehorse who won the Betfred Gold Cup in 2004 and ran in three Grand Nationals in 2004, 2006 and 2007 with limited success. He was formally trained in France before moving to Martin Pipe in 2002. After Martin retired his son David Pipe trained him.

In the 2006 Grand National Puntal overcame a 484-day absence to finish 6th, his best finish in the historic race to date.

He finished in 8th place in the 2007 Grand National, where his high odds of 100/1 fell to 50/1 just before the race started.

After a poor run at the 2009 Cheltenham Festival, his owner decided to retire Puntal from racing.
