= Stan Mellor =

British jockey and trainer (1937–2020)

Personal information
- Born: 10 April 1937
- Died: 1 August 2020 (aged 83)
- Occupation: Jockey

Horse racing career
- Sport: Horse racing

Major racing wins
- As a jockey King George VI Chase (twice); Whitbread Gold Cup; Mackeson Gold Cup; Gloucestershire Hurdle; Queen Mother Champion Chase; Hennessy Cognac Gold Cup; As a trainer Triumph Hurdle; Stayers' Hurdle

Honours
- MBE
- Updated on 16 April 2013

Stanley Thomas Edward Mellor MBE (10 April 1937 – 1 August 2020) was a National Hunt jockey and trainer who was the first jockey to ride 1,000 winners and Champion Jockey three years in a row from 1960 to 1962.

== Riding career ==
=== Riding style ===
Mellor was an intelligent jockey, rather than a physical one. He once bemoaned the effect this had on public perception of him: "If you win with strength people see it, and if you win with style people see it, but if you win with guile people don't see it."

He rode at a weight of 8 st 10 lb, not much more than a modern flat jockey.

=== Victory against Arkle ===
Mellor was one of the few jockeys to experience beating Arkle, often regarded as the greatest steeplechaser of all time. His victory against Arkle came in the 1966 Hennessy Gold Cup on 25-1 outsider Stalbridge Colonist. Because of the handicapping system, Arkle was regularly forced to compete conceding huge amounts of weight to other horses, and his defeat is often attributed to that. Mellor himself, however, maintains that Stalbridge Colonist beat him with a "turn of foot"

=== 1,000 Winners ===
On 10 December 1971, Mellor rode his 999th winner at Cheltenham. Despite another six rides there the next day, he couldn't add to it. Mellor spent another week trying to pass the landmark, racking up seven more losers in the process. His wife travelled with him every day so as not to miss the celebrations.

Finally, at Nottingham on 18 December 1971, he piloted grey gelding Ouzo to victory in the otherwise unremarkable Christmas Stocking Novices' Chase, thus becoming the first jump jockey to ride 1,000 winners. Dismounting from Ouzo, Mellor proclaimed it "a great relief" and was presented with an inscribed silver salver by his wife on behalf of the racecourse.

=== Falls and injuries ===
It is believed that Mellor had 750 falls during his riding career.

One especially bad fall coming down the hill at Cheltenham caused his riding cap to slip off and spin away causing his wife, watching in the stands, to scream, "Oh my God, his head has come off".

His worst fall, however, was in the 1963 Schweppes Gold Trophy when his lower face was smashed so badly it was almost completely detached. At the time, he was 20 wins clear of Josh Gifford in pursuit of a fourth successive jockey's title. The injury therefore probably cost him the championship.

== Training and retirement ==
When Mellor retired as a jockey, he was awarded an MBE in recognition of his achievements. He was also offered an appearance on This Is Your Life, which he turned down.

Mellor was originally based at Linkslade Stables in Lambourn. On selling the property, to Sheikh Mohamed Al Sabah of Kuwait, a deal he regards as the best deal he ever did, he was able to buy a yard twenty times the size near Swindon, which was named Pollardstown after his 1979 Triumph Hurdle winner.

Mellor was a successful trainer, though not as successful as his time in the saddle. He won a Stewards Cup, two Whitbread Gold Cups and four races at the Cheltenham Festival, including a 1–2 in the 1983 Triumph Hurdle with Saxon Farm and Tenth of October. His horses Royal Mail and Lean Ar Aghaidh were both placed in the Grand National. He was amongst those who pioneered the import of New Zealand bred horses (such as Royal Mail) and was known as "an excellent judge of a racehorse". Mellor himself, however, regards his training career as a disappointment, claiming he was too "laid-back" to succeed.

With horse numbers dwindling, he sold Pollardstown in 2001 and retired to Ashbury, near Lambourn. He had trained over 700 winners.

== Personal life ==
Mellor had a wife Elain, and two daughters, Dana and Linz, all of whom have ridden winners under Rules.

Stan Mellor died on 1 August 2020, aged 83.

== Big race wins ==
=== As a jockey ===
- King George VI Chase
- Whitbread Gold Cup
- Mackeson Gold Cup
- Gloucestershire Hurdle
- Queen Mother Champion Chase
- Hennessy Cognac Gold Cup

=== As a trainer ===
- Triumph Hurdle
- Stayers' Hurdle
