= Richard Pitman =

British jockey

Personal information
- Born: 21 January 1943 (age 83)
- Occupations: Jockey (retired) and horse racing commentator with the BBC (retired)

Horse racing career
- Sport: Horse racing
- Career wins: 427

Major racing wins
- 1970 Whitbread Gold Cup; 1972 Hennessy Gold Cup; 1972 Gainsborough Chase; 1972 Galloway Braes Novices' Chase; 1972 King George VI Chase; 1973 King George VI Chase; 1974 Champion Hurdle

Significant horses
- Lanzarote; Pendil; Crisp

Richard Thomas Pitman (born 21 January 1943) is a retired British jump jockey who rode 427 winners in his career, including Lanzarote in the 1974 Champion Hurdle. He won the King George VI Chase at Kempton Park Racecourse twice, the Whitbread Gold Cup once and the Hennessy Gold Cup once.

Pitman is also remembered for coming a close second in the 1973 Grand National on Crisp to Red Rum ridden by Brian Fletcher. He joined the BBC TV racing team in 1975. As an author, he has written seven racing novels and five non-fiction books.

Pitman married Jenny in 1965 and they had two sons, Mark and Paul. In 1968 they bought a horse training yard at Hinton Parva, near Swindon, which Jenny operated as a place of recuperation for injured horses; Richard's prize money from riding Steel Bridge into second place at the 1969 Grand National enabled them to build a house there. They moved to the Weathercock House yard at Lambourn in 1976, which Jenny continued to run after the end of their marriage in 1977.

Their son Mark was also a jockey, his most notable success being in the 1991 Cheltenham Gold Cup on Garrison Savannah, a horse trained by Jenny Pitman. Mark became a trainer in his own right upon his retirement.

== Bibliography ==
Pitman has written many books on the subject of horse racing. All have been co-authored with Joe McNally apart from Fit for a Queen and Good Horses Make Good Jockeys, including:

- Warned Off (The Eddie Malloy Series Book 1) 978-0340562918
- Hunted (The Eddie Malloy Series Book 2) 978-0340586440
- Blood Ties (The Eddie Malloy Series Book 3) 978-1490315645
- Running Scared (The Eddie Malloy Series Book 4) 978-1489558015
- The Third Degree (The Eddie Malloy Series Book 5) 978-0340695043
- Bet Your Life 978-0750524452
- Joseph’s Mansions 978-0006514503
- Pitman, Richard (1995). Fit for a Queen. ISBN 978-1874645214.
- Pitman, Richard (1976). Good Horses Make Good Jockeys. ISBN 978-0720709117.
