= John Francome =

British jockey

John Francome MBE
Personal information
- Born: 13 December 1952 (age 73) Swindon, England
- Occupations: Jockey; Broadcaster; Author

Horse racing career
- Sport: Horse racing
- Career wins: 1,138

Major racing wins
- Cheltenham Gold Cup, Stayers' Hurdle, Champion Hurdle, King George VI Chase, Sun Alliance Chase

Honours
- British Champion Jump Jockey (7 times); RTS Best Sports Pundit (2004)

Significant horses
- Sea Pigeon, Wayward Lad, Burrough Hill Lad Midnight Court

John Francome (born 13 December 1952) is a retired seven-time British Champion jump jockey. He was previously a racing trainer and broadcaster with Channel 4, and is an author.

== Racing career ==
Francome first rode a pony called Black Beauty at the age of six. His first riding successes came as a showjumper, and was a member of the team that won the European Junior Show Jumping Championship for Great Britain.

Francome's father secured a meeting with trainer Fred Winter and he became an apprentice in October 1969. His first race ride came at Worcester in December 1970, a race he won riding Multigrey trained by Godfrey Burr. In February 1971, Francome rode his first of 575 winners for trainer Winter on Osceola at Towcester. Osbaldeston was an early success story for the Francome/Winter partnership, notching up 17 victories.

Francome won his first British Champion Jump Jockey title in the 1975/76 season. The same year he secured his first Grade 1 victory in the Sun Alliance Chase at Cheltenham with Pengrail. On his way to the 1977/78 British Champion Jump Jockey title, he won the Cheltenham Gold Cup on Midnight Court. In 1981, he won the Stayers Hurdle on Derring Rose by 30 lengths again for Winter.

One of Francome's most successful horses was Burrough Hill Lad, trained by Jenny Pitman. Francome took victories in the Welsh Grand National, Hennessy Gold Cup and King George VI Chase. At the 1984 Gold Cup, Francome could not ride Burrough Hill Lad due to his retainer with Winter, and finished second with Brown Chamberlin - a horse he had won both the Sun Alliance Chase and Hennessy Gold Cup on. Alongside riding for Pitman, Francome had success riding for Michael Dickinson, successes on Wayward Lad in the 1982 King George VI Chase and also on Silver Buck, Bregawn and Flatterer.

Whilst many top successes came in Chases, Francome had success over hurdles with Sea Pigeon winning the 1981 Champion Hurdle.

During the 1982 season, Francome stopped riding once he drew level with competitor, Peter Scudamore, in the Jump Jockeys Championship as Scudamore was injured. The two shared the title. Francome broke Stan Mellor's record of 1035 wins on Don't Touch at Fontwell in May 1984.

In 1985, Francome retired and had ridden 1,138 winners over jumps in Britain and a total of seven British Champion Jump Jockey Titles.

The John Francome Novices' Chase at Newbury was named after him in 2017.

=== Major wins ===
(United Kingdom) Great Britain

- Cheltenham Gold Cup - Midnight Court (1978)
- Sun Alliance Chase - Pengrail (1975), Brown Chamberlin (1982)
- Stayers Hurdle - Derring Rose (1981)
- Champion Hurdle - Sea Pigeon (1981)
- King George VI Chase - Wayward Lad (1982), Burrough Hill Lad (1984)

=== Cheltenham Festival winners (5) ===
- Cheltenham Gold Cup - Midnight Court (1978)
- Sun Alliance Chase - Pengrail (1975), Brown Chamberlin (1982)
- Stayers Hurdle - Derring Rose (1981)
- Champion Hurdle - Sea Pigeon (1981)

=== Controversies ===
Francome had several controversial moments during his riding career. In 1978 he was suspended for 35 days for passing information to bookmaker, John Banks. He once famously referred to the racing stewards as "Cabbage Patch Dolls".

== Career after racing ==
=== Writer ===
In 1986, Francome published his first fiction novel Eavesdropper. He went on to write a further 24 books. His most recent novel was Storm Rider published in 2010. His autobiography Born Lucky was published in 1985.

==== Bibliography ====
Francome's fiction books:

| Title | Publication Date | ISBN |
|---|---|---|
| Eavesdropper | 1986 | 0-356-12744-3 |
| Riding High | 1987 | 0-356-14558-1 |
| Declared Dead | 1988 | 0-7472-0087-4 |
| Blood Stock | 1989 | 0-7472-0129-3 |
| Stone Cold | 1990 | 0-7472-0227-3 |
| Stud Poker | 1991 | 0-7472-0390-3 |
| Rough Ride | 1992 | 0-7472-0566-3 |
| Outsider | 1993 | 0-7472-0749-6 |
| Break Neck | 1994 | 0-7472-1032-2 |
| Dead Ringer | 1995 | 0-7472-1264-3 |
| False Start | 1996 | 0-7472-1653-3 |
| High Flyer | 1997 | 0-7472-1896-X |
| Safe Bet | 1998 | 0-7472-2133-2 |
| Tip Off | 1999 | 0-7472-2134-0 |
| Lifeline | 2000 | 0-7472-7239-5 |
| Dead Weight | 2001 | 0-7472-7241-7 |
| Inside Track | 2002 | 0-7553-0060-2 |
| Stalking Horse | 2003 | 0-7553-0668-6 |
| Back Hander | 2004 | 0-7553-0681-3 |
| Cover Up | 2005 | 0-7553-2690-3 |
| Winner Takes All | 2006 | 0-7553-2948-1 |
| Dark Horse | 2007 | 978-0-7553-4703-2 |
| Final Breath | 2008 | 978-0-7553-3728-6 |
| Deadly Finish | 2009 | 978-0-7553-4990-6 |
| Storm Rider | 2010 | 978-0-7394-3069-9 |

Francome's non fiction books:

| Title | Publication Date | ISBN |
|---|---|---|
| Born Lucky | 1986 | 978-0-5521-3070-7 |
| Twice Lucky | 1988 | 978-0-7472-3382-4 |

=== Broadcaster ===
Francome was a member of the Channel 4 Racing television broadcast team. He appeared on the weekly show The Morning Line and also on race day broadcasts. In 2012, when Channel 4 Racing changed production companies from Highflyer to IMG, Francome left his role.

=== Injured Jockeys Fund ===
Between 2012 and 2016, Francome was the President of The Injured Jockeys Fund. From 2017, he became a Vice Patron alongside fellow jockeys AP McCoy and Frankie Dettori.

== Personal life ==
Francome was born in Swindon, Wiltshire. In 1976 he married Miriam Strigner. The couple divorced in 1990. Sam Ricketts, the former professional footballer for Wales is his nephew.

In the 1986 New Year Honours, Francome was appointed a Member of the Order of the British Empire (MBE) "for services to National Hunt Racing."

Francome built and owns Beechdown Farm in Lambourn, a stableyard and training facility that can house 96 horses. Clive Cox is currently the resident racing trainer.

Awards
| Preceded by Michael Johnson | RTS Television Sport Awards; Best Sports Pundit; 2004 | Succeeded by Martin Brundle |
