= Richard Rowe (horse racing) =

Richard Rowe (born 11 November 1959) is a National Hunt racehorse trainer and a former jockey in the United Kingdom.

== Career as a jockey ==
- 1984 - LILAC NOVICES HURDLE WINNER (Paddy Boro)
- 1982 - Whitbread Gold Cup winner Shady Deal
- 1988 - Scilly Isles Novices' Chase winner Yeoman Broker
- 1988 - Galloway Braes Novices' Chase winner Saffron Lord

== Career as trainer ==
- 1998 - Kingwell Hurdle winner I'm Supposin
- 1999 - Whitbread Gold Cup winner Eulogy
- 2000 - Dovecote Novices' Hurdle winner Hariymi
