= Fred Winter =

British racehorse trainer

- Fred Winter on Sundew, winner of the 1957 Grand National
- Born: 20 September 1926
- Died: 5 April 2004 (aged 77)
- Education: Ewell Castle School
- Occupations: Jockey; Horse trainer
- Years active: 1950–1980
- Known for: Winning the Grand National 4 times
- Spouse: Diana Winter (married 1956–2004)
- Children: Denise Winter; Joanna Winter; Philippa Winter

Frederick Thomas Winter, CBE (20 September 1926 – 5 April 2004) was a British National Hunt racing racehorse jockey and trainer. He was British jump racing Champion Jockey four times and British jump racing Champion Trainer eight times. He is the only person to have won the Cheltenham Gold Cup, Champion Hurdle and Grand National as both jockey and trainer. Winter won the Grand National four times, as a jockey in 1957 (Sundew) and 1962 (Kilmore), and as a trainer in 1965 (Jay Trump) and 1966 (Anglo).

His most famous victory as a jockey was on Mandarin in the 1962 Grand Steeple-Chase de Paris at Auteuil. His victory despite his illness, a broken bit and Mandarin breaking down in the last half-mile was voted the greatest ride ever in a 2006 Racing Post poll. The race was listed in The Guardian as one of the greatest races ever.

As a jockey he rode a then-record 923 National Hunt winners before his retirement in 1964.

He was appointed CBE in the 1963 Birthday Honours.

Cheltenham Gold Cup (twice as a jockey and once as a trainer).
Champion Hurdle (3 times as a jockey and 4 times as a trainer).
Grand National (see above).
King George VI Chase (3 times as jockey and 2 times as trainer)

He won 45 times at the annual Cheltenham Festival (17 as jockey and 28 as trainer), and is commemorated by the Fred Winter Juvenile Novices' Handicap Hurdle at the annual meet.

Details of his training career are as follows:

Stables: Uplands, Lambourn, Berkshire 1964–88

First runner and winner: Jay Trump, Sandown, 21 October 1964

Grand National winners: Jay Trump (1965), Anglo (1966)

Cheltenham Gold Cup: Midnight Court (1978)

Champion Hurdle winners: Bula (1971, 1972), Lanzarote (1974), Celtic Shot (1988)

Champion Chase winner: Crisp (1971)

Other Cheltenham Festival winners:

Bula (1970 Gloucestershire Hurdle, Div 2), Soloning (1970 Arkle Challenge Trophy, 1972 Cathcart Chase), Pendil (1972 Arkle Challenge Trophy), Killiney (1973 Totalisator Champion Chase), Soothsayer (1974 Cathcart Chase), Outpoint (1977 Joe Coral Golden Hurdle Final), Venture To Cognac (1979 Sun Alliance Novices' Hurdle, 1984 Foxhunter Chase), Roller-Coaster (1979 Cathcart Chase), Stopped (1980 Grand Annual Chase), Rolls Rambler (1980 Foxhunter Chase), Derring Rose (1981 Stayers' Hurdle), Friendly Alliance (1981 Grand Annual Chase), Brown Chamberlin (1982 Sun Alliance Chase), Observe (1983 Cathcart Chase, 1987 Foxhunter Chase), Half Free (1984 Mildmay of Flete Chase, 1986 Cathcart Chase, 1987 Cathcart Chase), Glyde Court (1985 Kim Muir Memorial Chase, 1986 Kim Muir Memorial Chase)

Other notable winners: Royal Sanction (1966 Imperial Cup), Into View (1970 Welsh Champion Chase, Black & White Gold Cup), Bula (1970 Benson & Hedges Hurdle, 1971 Welsh Champion Hurdle, 1973 Black & White Whisky Gold Cup), Pendil (1972 Welsh Champion Chase, Black & White Whisky Gold Cup, Benson & Hedges Chase, King George VI Chase, 1973 Massey Ferguson Gold Cup, King George VI Chase), Lanzarote (1973 Imperial Cup, Christmas Hurdle, 1975 Welsh Champion Hurdle, Christmas Hurdle), Acquaint (1977 Imperial Cup), Prayukta (1980 Imperial Cup), Fifty Dollars More (1982 Mackeson Gold Cup, 1983 Kennedy Construction Gold Cup), Observe (1982 Kennedy Construction Gold Cup), Brown Chamberlin (1983 Hennessy Cognac Gold Cup), Half Free (1984 Mackeson Gold Cup, 1985 Mackeson Gold Cup), Plundering (1986 Whitbread Gold Cup), Celtic Shot (1987 Mecca Bookmakers' Hurdle)

Last runner and winner: Stag Dinner, Stratford, 4 June 1988

Champion trainer: 8 times: 1970–71 to 1974–75; 1976–77, 1977–78, 1984–85.

Most wins in a season: 99 in 1975–76

Total wins over jumps in Britain: 1,557 in 24 seasons (1964–88)

Main jockeys: Eddie Harty 1964–68, Bobby Beasley 1968–69, Paul Kelleway 1969–72, Richard Pitman 1972–75, John Francome 1975–85, Ben de Haan/Jimmy Duggan 1985–86, Peter Scudamore 1986–88
