= Fulke Walwyn =

British jockey and racehorse trainer (1910-1991)

Fulke Thomas Tyndall Walwyn CVO
Personal information
- Born: 8 November 1910 Wrexham, Wales
- Died: 18 February 1991 (aged 80)
- Education: Malvern College; Royal Military College, Sandhurst
- Occupations: Jockey; Trainer
- Relatives: Charles Walwyn (uncle); Peter Walwyn (cousin)

Horse racing career
- Sport: Horse racing
- Career wins: 1936 Grand National
- Military career
- Allegiance: United Kingdom
- Branch: British Army
- Units: 9th Lancers; Royal Military Police
- Conflicts: World War II

Fulke Thomas Tyndall Walwyn CVO (8 November 1910 – 18 February 1991) was a British jockey and a celebrated racehorse trainer, who was particularly successful in National Hunt racing.

== Life ==
Walwyn was born in Wrexham. His twin sister, Helen Johnson Houghton (1910–2012), was a racehorse owner and trainer who was one of the first women elected as a member of the Jockey Club. Their cousin, Peter Walwyn (1933–2017), was also a racehorse trainer.

His father, Colonel Fulke Walwyn, was an officer in the Royal Welch Fusiliers, and Master of the Monmouth Hounds from 1922 to 1931. His mother died when Helen and Fulke were still young.

He was educated at Malvern College and the Royal Military College, Sandhurst, and then became an officer in the 9th Lancers but resigned his commission in 1935. He was a military policeman for two years in the Second World War, before serving with the 9th Lancers in France.

== Career ==
As a jockey, his most notable victory came as an amateur rider on Reynoldstown in the 1936 Grand National. He rode as a professional after he left the army, but was forced to retire from riding after a fall at Ludlow in 1939 fractured his skull. He bought a stables at Delamere House in Lambourn, and had immediate success, training 18 winners before the outbreak of the Second World War. Walwyn attempted to rejoin the forces but was rejected because of his racing injuries. He moved to Saxon House stables in 1944, and became one of the most successful National Hunt trainers of all time.

He trained the winners of four Cheltenham Gold Cups, two Champion Hurdles, five King George VI Chases, seven Whitbread Gold Cups, seven Hennessy Gold Cups and a Grand National, in 1964 with Team Spirit. He was British jump racing Champion Trainer five times.

He trained 40 winners at the Cheltenham Festival between 1946 and 1986, a record which stood until 2012, when beaten by Nicky Henderson. He is commemorated at the Cheltenham Racecourse, in the title of the Festival's Fulke Walwyn Kim Muir Challenge Cup.

Amongst his notable owners were Dorothy Paget until 1954 and, following the death of Peter Cazalet in 1973, the Queen Mother. As well as his many victories in National Hunt racing, he also trained Dorothy Paget's Aldborough to win the Doncaster Cup and the Queen Alexandra Stakes on the Flat.

Walwyn became a household name in 1964, when his Cheltenham Gold Cup winner, Mill House, was defending his crown against Arkle, in an epic race that eventually saw Arkle win the first of his three Gold Cup victories.

He was appointed a Commander of the Royal Victorian Order (CVO) in the 1983 New Year Honours.

He died at Saxon House. In all, he achieved over 2000 wins. After his death, the 3-mile Kim Muir Memorial Chase at the Cheltenham National Hunt Festival was renamed the Fulke Walwyn Kim Muir Challenge Cup, in his honour.
