= Richard Dunwoody =

British jockey

Personal information
- Born: 18 January 1964 (age 62) Belfast, Northern Ireland
- Occupation: Jockey

Horse racing career
- Sport: Horse racing
- Career wins: 1,874

Major racing wins
- Cheltenham Gold Cup (1988); Champion Hurdle (1990); King George VI Chase (1989, 1990, 1995, 1996); Grand National (1986, 1994)

Racing awards
- British jump racing Champion Jockey (1992-93, 1993-94, 1994-95)

Honours
- Member of the Order of the British Empire

Significant horses
- Charter Party, Desert Orchid, Kribensis, Miinnehoma, One Man, Remittance Man, West Tip

Thomas Richard Dunwoody MBE (born 18 January 1964) is a retired British National Hunt jockey. He was a three-time British Champion Jockey. He was the only jockey of his generation to win the Grand National, Cheltenham Gold Cup and Champion Hurdle.

== Racing career ==
Dunwoody was born on 18 January 1964 in Belfast, Northern Ireland. His race victories include the 1986 and 1994 Grand Nationals on West Tip and Miinnehoma respectively, the 1988 Cheltenham Gold Cup on Charter Party and the Champion Hurdle on Kribensis. He won the Boxing Day King George VI Chase four times - twice on Desert Orchid in 1989 and 1990 and twice on One Man in 1995 and 1996.

He received the Lester Award for "Jump Jockey of the Year" on five occasions. At the time his retirement in 1999, he held the record for most career winners (1874), until Tony McCoy passed his total in 2002.

In March 1994 Dunwoody received a 14-day ban for deliberately obstructing his title rival Adrian Maguire's horse. This meant that Dunwoody missed the 1994 Cheltenham Festival. Despite this Dunwoody still became national hunt champion jockey at the end of the 1993/94 season.

== Charity work ==
On 18 January 2008, it was reported that Dunwoody and American explorer Doug Stoup had reached the South Pole following a 48-day trek raising money for charity. Their route followed one which had previously been attempted by Ernest Shackleton and was both the first successful completion of that route on foot as well the first successfully completed new route to the South Pole in ten years.

On 29 May 2009, Dunwoody started a 1000 Mile Challenge for charity and walked the same mile 1000 consecutive times in Newmarket for 1000 consecutive hours with the last mile up the home straight of Newmarket racecourse just before the Bunbury Cup on 10 July 2009.

On 26 February 2017, Dunwoody embarked on a walk across Japan, covering a distance of 2,000 miles, to raise money for Sarcoma UK cancer charity. His trek, from Cape Sata on the southern tip of Kyushu to Cape Soya, the northernmost part of Hokkaido, took 101 days.

== Strictly Come Dancing ==
In September 2009, Dunwoody took part in Series 7 of the BBC's Strictly Come Dancing partnering Lilia Kopylova. The couple were eliminated on the second week.

== Honours ==
Dunwoody was appointed Member of the Order of the British Empire (MBE) in the 1993 Birthday Honours for services to horse racing.

== Cheltenham Festival winners (18) ==
- Cheltenham Gold Cup - (1) Charter Party (1988)
- Champion Hurdle - (1) Kribensis (1990)
- Arkle Challenge Trophy - (3) Waterloo Boy (1989), Remittance Man (1991), Ventana Canyon (1996)
- RSA Insurance Novices' Chase - (2) Hanakham (1997), Florida Pearl (1998)
- Champion Bumper - (2) Montelado (1992), Florida Pearl (1997)
- Triumph Hurdle - (2) Kribensis (1988), Paddy's Return (1996)
- Baring Bingham Novices' Hurdle - (1) Thetford Forest (1992)
- County Handicap Hurdle - (2) Thumbs Up (1993), Barna Boy (1997)
- Festival Trophy Handicap Chase - (2) West Tip (1985), Bigsun (1990)
- Johnny Henderson Grand Annual Chase - (1) French Union (1987)
- Pertemps Final - (1) Von Trappe (1995)

== Major wins ==
(United Kingdom) Great Britain

- King George VI Chase - (4) Desert Orchid (1989,1990), One Man (1995,1996)
- Grand National - (2) West Tip (1986), Miinnehoma (1994)
- Tingle Creek Chase - (5) Lefrak City (1985), Waterloo Boy (1991, 1992), Sound Man (1995, 1996)
- Henry VIII Novices' Chase - (3) Acre Hill (1990), Wonder Man (1992), Certainly Strong (1995)
- Long Walk Hurdle - (2) Bluff Cove (1987), Princeful (1998)
- Kauto Star Novices' Chase - (3) Von Trappe (1985), Sparkling Flame (1990), Mutare (1991)
- Christmas Hurdle - (3) Kribensis (1988,1989), Mighty Mogul (1992)
- Challow Novices' Hurdle - (1) Tyrone Bridge (1991)
- Tolworth Novices' Hurdle - (1) Behrajan (1999)
- Scilly Isles Novices' Chase - (1) Baydon Star (1994)
- Ascot Chase - (1) Sound Man (1996)
- Betway Bowl - (2) Aquilifer (1991), Docklands Express (1994)
- Aintree Hurdle - (2) Celtic Chief (1988), Morley Street (1992)
- Top Novices' Hurdle - (1) Carobee (1992)
- Mildmay Novices' Chase - (4) Against the Grain (1987), Sparkling Flame (1991), Banjo (1995), Cyborgo (1997)
- Melling Chase - (1) Remittance Man (1992)
- Mersey Novices' Hurdle - (2) Cyborgo (1994), Sanmartino (1997)
- Liverpool Hurdle - (2) Sweet Glow (1994), Trainglot (1997)

(Republic of Ireland) Ireland

- Irish Gold Cup - (2) Dorans Pride (1998), Florida Pearl (1999)
- Irish Grand National - (1) Desert Orchid (1990)
- Ryanair Gold Cup - (1) Dorans Pride (1997)
- Punchestown Champion Chase - (2) Viking Flagship (1993), Celibate (1999)
- John Durkan Memorial Punchestown Chase - (2) Merry Gale (1995), Dorans Pride (1997)
- Drinmore Novice Chase - (1) Dorans Pride (1996)
- Racing Post Novice Chase - (1) Chirkpar (1993)
- Savills Chase - (2) Very Promising (1986), Johnny Setaside (1996)
- Slaney Novice Hurdle - (1) Promalee (1998)
- Dr P. J. Moriarty Novice Chase - (2) Flashing Steel (1993), Florida Pearl (1998)
- Herald Champion Novice Hurdle - (3) High Plains (1987), The Proclamation (1989), Bayrouge (1993)
- Ryanair Novice Chase - (2) Viking Flagship (1993), Ventana Canyon (1996)
- Alanna Homes Champion Novice Hurdle - (1) Treble Bob (1995)
