= Josh Gifford =

British jockey and trainer (1941–2012)

Josh Gifford (3 August 1941 – 9 February 2012) was a jockey and trainer in National Hunt racing. He was a four-time Champion Jockey, riding 642 winners in his career. He retired from training in 2002, aged 60, and his son Nick Gifford took over training duties. Josh's daughter Kristina Cook (née Gifford) is an Olympic medal winning rider who competes in the horse trials sport of eventing.

== Biography ==
Gifford was born in Huntingdon. At the age of 28, he turned to training racehorses, with Frank Pullen being his first owner, and later trained Aldaniti, the winner of the 1981 Grand National. He was played by Edward Woodward in the 1983 film Champions.

His training stables, which he took over from his former boss, Captain H. Ryan Price, were located in Findon, West Sussex.

His daughter, Kristina Cook, won two eventing bronze medals at the 2008 Beijing Olympics, in both the team and individual events, and a silver medal in the team event at the 2012 London Olympics.

He died in the early hours of 9 February 2012 at his Findon yard in West Sussex, after suffering a heart attack.

Sandown Park Racecourse have a race named in his honour at their end of season jumps finale meeting. The Josh Gifford Novices’ Handicap Chase is run over 2 miles 4 1/2 furlongs. It was first run in 2014. Previously there had been a Juvenile Hurdle on the same card named after him. The Josh Gifford Memorial Trophy is raced for annually at Plumpton racecourse.
