= Thistlecrack =

British-bred Thoroughbred racehorse

- Racing silks of John and Heather Snook
- Sire: Kayf Tara
- Grandsire: Sadler's Wells
- Dam: Ardstown
- Damsire: Ardross
- Sex: Gelding
- Foaled: 29 March 2008
- Country: United Kingdom
- Colour: Bay
- Breeder: R. F. and S. D. Knipe
- Owner: John and Heather Snook
- Trainer: Colin Tizzard
- Record: 25: 13-4-2
- Earnings: £743,651

Major wins
- Sefton Novices' Hurdle (2015); Long Distance Hurdle (2015); Long Walk Hurdle (2015); Cleeve Hurdle (2016); World Hurdle (2016); Liverpool Hurdle (2016); Worcester Novices' Chase (2016); King George VI Chase (2016)

Awards
- British National Hunt Horse of the Year (2016)

Thistlecrack (foaled 29 March 2008) is a British Thoroughbred racehorse who competes in National Hunt races. Unraced until he was five years old, he recorded his first win in a National Hunt Flat race in 2014. In the 2014/15 National Hunt season he won two minor hurdle races before improving when tried over long distances and winning the Grade 1 Sefton Novices' Hurdle. In the following season he established himself as the best staying hurdler in Britain with wins in the Long Distance Hurdle, Long Walk Hurdle, Cleeve Hurdle, World Hurdle and Liverpool Hurdle. When switched to steeplechasing in the following season he made an immediate impact, taking the Worcester Novices' Chase before beating more experienced horses in the King George VI Chase. His later career was beset by injury problems and he never won again, being retired from racing in March 2021 at the age of thirteen.

== Background ==
Thistlecrack is a bay gelding with a small white star bred in England by R F And S D Knipe. He was sired by Kayf Tara, an outstanding stayer who won two Ascot Gold Cups and two Irish St. Legers and was a three time Cartier Champion Stayer. His other offspring have included Planet of Sound (Punchestown Gold Cup), Blaklion (RSA Chase), Special Tiara (Celebration Chase), Tea For Two (Feltham Novices' Chase) and Carruthers (Hennessy Gold Cup). Thistlecrack's dam Ardstown was a successful racemare who won three times on the amateur Point-to-point circuit and four times under National Hunt rules.

As a foal in November 2008 the colt was offered for sale at Tattersalls Ireland and was bought for €32,000 by John McDonald. In August 2011, by which time he had been gelded, Thistlecrack was returned to the same sales ring and was sold to John Snook for €43,000. He was sent into training with Colin Tizzard at Milborne Port in Dorset.

== Racing career ==
=== Early career ===
Thistlecrack began his racing career at the age of five, when he finished third in a National Hunt Flat race at Wincanton Racecourse on 14 April 2013. After an absence of a year, he returned to Wincanton for the corresponding event in 2014 and recorded his first success as he won by three lengths at odds of 14/1.

=== 2014/15 National Hunt season: novice hurdles ===
In the 2014/15 National Hunt season, Thistlecrack finished fifth in the Championship Standard Open NH Flat Race at Ascot Racecourse in December and was then campaigned in novice hurdle races. On his first run over obstacles he won "easily" at Wincanton on 15 January, taking the lead approaching the final hurdle and drawing away to win by nine lengths. Nine days later the gelding was stepped up in class for the Grade 2 Classic Novices' Hurdle at Cheltenham Racecourse and finished tailed-off in seventh place behind the Alan King-trained Ordo Ab Chao. Having been ridden by an amateur jockey in his previous starts, Thistlecrack was partnered by the leading professional Ruby Walsh when he ran at Ascot in 14 February. Starting at odds of 100/30 he came from last place to join the leaders at the final flight of hurdles and "stormed clear" on the run-in to win by three and three quarter lengths. Aidan Coleman took the ride when the gelding was matched against more experienced rivals in the Imperial Cup at Sandown Park on 7 March. Carrying 151 pounds he stayed on without being able to quicken and finished fifth of the twenty-three runners behind Ebony Express.

All but one of Thistlecrack's previous starts at been at or around a distance of two miles, but on 10 April he was stepped up to three miles for the Grade 1 Sefton Novices' Hurdle at Aintree's Grand National meeting. Ridden for the first time by Tom Scudamore he started a 25/1 outsider in a sixteen-runner field headed by the Willie Mullins-trained Roi des Francs. The other runners included Vyta Du Roc (Sharp Novices' Hurdle, Winter Novices' Hurdle), Ordo Ab Chao, Alpha des Obeaux (runner up to Douvan at Punchestown) and Blaklion (Persian War Novices' Hurdle, Bristol Novices' Hurdle). After being restrained by Scudamore Thistlecrack moved up to dispute the lead with Alpha des Obeaux at the second last. He was left well clear when his rival fell at the final hurdle and came home thirteen lengths clear of Vyta Du Roc despite being eased down in the closing stages. After the race Colin Tizzard said "He wasn't right when he was well-beaten last time we stepped up in trip at Cheltenham. He's been very good otherwise. He's always been a good horse on our gallops. I was sure he would stay, his dam was a stout stayer. He's a thorough stayer and travels well."

On his final appearance of the season, Thistlecrack was sent to Ireland for the Irish Daily Mirror Novice Hurdle at Punchestown on 29 April. Starting at 8/1 he was crowded at the final hurdle but stayed on up the run-in to finish second, half a length behind Killultagh Vic. The favoured Shaneshill was eight and a half lengths back in third.

=== 2015/16 National Hunt season: senior hurdles ===
On his first appearance of the new season, Thistlecrack was one of five horses to contest the Grade 2 Long Distance Hurdle over three miles at Newbury Racecourse on 28 November. He was ridden by Scudamore and started the 7/2 third choice in the betting behind the dual Liverpool Hurdle winner Whisper and the World Hurdle winner Cole Harden. After tracking the leaders he took the lead at the final flight and stayed on to win by six lengths and half a length from Deputy Dan and Cole Harden. Three weeks later he started favourite for the Grade 1 Long Walk Hurdle at Ascot, with his main opposition appearing to come from Reve de Sivola (winner of the race for the last three years) and Saphir du Rheu (Mildmay Novices' Chase). Scudamore tracked the leaders before overtaking Reve de Sivola at the second last and the favourite went on to win by eight lengths in "impressive" fashion. Tizzard, who had moved his horses to a new training facility away from his dairy farm commented "now I’ve got a racing yard without cows in sight, it's lovely". On 30 January Thistlecrack was made the odds-on favourite for the Grade 2 Cleeve Hurdle at Cheltenham. On this occasion the best of his rivals, according to the betting, were Camping Ground (Relkeel Hurdle) and Ptit Zig (Noel Novices' Chase, Dipper Novices' Chase). Thistlecrack was always going well, took the lead approaching the last and drew right away to win by twelve lengths from Ptit Zig.

On 17 March Thistlecrack started the even money favourite for the World Hurdle at the Cheltenham Festival. His opponents included Alpha des Obeaux, Cole Harden, Bobs Worth Saphir du Rheu, Whisper, Aux Petit Soins (Coral Cup), Martello Tower (Spa Novices' Hurdle) and At Fishers Cross (Spa Novices' Hurdle, Sefton Novices' Hurdle). He raced towards the rear of the field before moving up into third place behind Cole Harden on the second circuit. He took the lead at the second last, shook off the challenge of Alpha des Obeaux and drew away to win by seven lengths with a gap of twenty-two lengths back to Bobs Worth in third. After the race Tizzard commented "This is relief. We’ve got this beautiful horse and he's come here fit and well, and we’re just chuffed for everybody concerned. He has gone from a very nice horse to a superstar" before suggesting that the horse would compete in steeplechases in the following season. The official BHA handicapper awarded Thistlecrack a rating of 174: this equaled the best mark achieved by Big Buck's and was two pounds higher than the peak ratings given to Inglis Drever and Baracouda. At Aintree on 9 April Thistlecrack started 2/7 favourite for the Liverpool Stayers' Hurdle against four opponents were headed by the Nicky Henderson-trained Different Gravey and the RSA Chase runner-up Shaneshill. He took the lead soon after the start and was never seriously challenged: he survived a mistake at the second last before pulling away to win easily by seven lengths from Shaneshill.

=== 2016/17 National Hunt season: steeplechases ===
Thistlecrack made his first appearance over steeplechase fences in a three-mile Novice Chase at Chepstow Racecourse on 25 October in which he started the 1/6 favourite and won by four lengths from Aqalim after leading from the start. On 12 November at Cheltenham he won again, overcoming an early jumping error to win by three and three quarter lengths from Marinero. Two weeks later at Newbury the gelding started at odds of 1/6 for the Grade II Worcester Novices' Chase over three miles. He led from the start and won "very easily" by eight lengths from Bigbadjohn.

Rather than continue to campaign the horse against other novices, Tizzard opted to match Thistlecrack against more seasoned steeplechasers in the King George VI Chase at Kempton Park Racecourse on 26 December. Despite his lack of chasing experience he was made favourite ahead of his stablemate Cue Card and Silviniaco Conti who had won the race in 2013 and 2014. The other two runners were Josses Hill (Peterborough Chase) and Tea For Two (Kauto Star Novices' Chase). He produced a dominant performance, taking the lead at the ninth fence and drawing eight lengths clear in the straight before being eased down to win by three and a quarter lengths from Cue Card.

On 28 January Thistlecrack started 4/9 favourite for the Cotswold Chase at Cheltenham but sustained his first defeat in a steeplechase as he was beaten a short-head by the ill-fated Many Clouds who collapsed and died after the race. Despite his defeat he maintained his position as favourite for the Cheltenham Gold Cup but after sustaining a tendon injury in February it was announced that he would miss the rest of the season.

=== Later career ===
After a ten-month absence Thistlecrack returned in the Long Distance Hurdle at Newbury on 1 December 2017 when he started the 11/10 favourite but came home fifth of the six runners behind the 40/1 outsider Beer Goggles. On 26 December he attempted to repeat his 2016 success in the King George VI Chase. He appeared to be going well but made a jumping mistake at the second last and dropped from contention to finish fourth behind Might Bite. After the race he was reported to be "stiff and sore" and when scans revealed a stress fracture to his leg he was off the track for the rest of the season. Colin Tizzard's daughter Kim said "We were just getting really excited that the old Thistlecrack was still there and hopeful that he would go to the Gold Cup. Gutted for everybody, gutted for the staff and the owners but we have a horse and hopefully he'll do his box rest and be all right for next season."

Thistlecrack made his comeback in a strong edition of the Lancashire Chase at Haydock Park on 24 November 2018 and ran well to take third place behind Bristol de Mai and Native River with Clan des Obeaux and Might Bite in fourth and fifth. In the King George VI Chase at Kempton on Boxing Day he took the lead at the fourth last but was overtaken by Clan des Obeaux at the final fence and finished second, beaten a length and a half by the winner. In the Cheltenham Gold Cup on 15 March he stumbled at the 12th fence and dropped back before being pulled up by Tom Scudamore at the 17th obstacle.

On 29 November 2019 Thistlecrack started second favourite for the Long Distance Hurdle at Newbury and finished second of the five runners, beaten a length by the winner Paisley Park. A foot injury kept him from running in the King George VI Chase and when he failed to recover he was ruled out for the remainder of the season.

Thistlecrack remained in training for the following season but never returned to the track and his retirement was announced in March 2021. Colin Tizzard said "He was one of the best horses around in his era and we had some great days... on our gallop he was the best horse we ever had... He didn't deserve to be pushed anymore. He's been hacked around now and he'll stay here and we'll look after him, then when the weather warms up he'll go back to Heather's and have a summer off. Hopefully then he can have an active retirement."

== Pedigree ==
Pedigree of Thistlecrack (GB), bay gelding, 2008
Sire Kayf Tara (GB) 1994	Sadler's Wells (USA); 1981	Northern Dancer	Nearctic
Sire Kayf Tara (GB) 1994	Sadler's Wells (USA); 1981	Northern Dancer	Natalma
Sire Kayf Tara (GB) 1994	Sadler's Wells (USA); 1981	Fairy Bridge	Bold Reason
Sire Kayf Tara (GB) 1994	Sadler's Wells (USA); 1981	Fairy Bridge	Special
Sire Kayf Tara (GB) 1994	Colorspin (GB); 1983	High Top	Derring-Do
Sire Kayf Tara (GB) 1994	Colorspin (GB); 1983	High Top	Camenae
Sire Kayf Tara (GB) 1994	Colorspin (GB); 1983	Reprocolor	Jimmy Reppin
Sire Kayf Tara (GB) 1994	Colorspin (GB); 1983	Reprocolor	Blue Queen
Dam Ardstown (GB) 1991	Ardross (IRE); 1976	Run the Gantlet	Tom Rolfe
Dam Ardstown (GB) 1991	Ardross (IRE); 1976	Run the Gantlet	First Feather
Dam Ardstown (GB) 1991	Ardross (IRE); 1976	Le Melody	Levmoss
Dam Ardstown (GB) 1991	Ardross (IRE); 1976	Le Melody	Arctic Melody
Dam Ardstown (GB) 1991	Booterstown (IRE); 1971	Master Owen	Owen Tudor
Dam Ardstown (GB) 1991	Booterstown (IRE); 1971	Master Owen	Miss Maisie
Dam Ardstown (GB) 1991	Booterstown (IRE); 1971	Vulgan's Rose	Vulgan
Dam Ardstown (GB) 1991	Booterstown (IRE); 1971	Vulgan's Rose	Nevada Rose (Family 2-o)
