= Sir Harry Lewis =

American-bred Thoroughbred racehorse

- Sire: Alleged
- Grandsire: Hoist The Flag
- Dam: Sue Babe
- Damsire: Mr. Prospector
- Sex: Stallion
- Foaled: 24 January 1984
- Country: United States
- Colour: Bay
- Breeder: H. Joseph Allen & Regent Farm
- Owner: Howard Kaskel; Sugar Maple Farm
- Trainer: Barry Hills; D. Wayne Lukas
- Record: 17: 4-2-4

Major wins
- Dee Stakes (1987); Irish Derby (1987)

Awards
- Timeform rating 81 p (1986), 127 (1987)

Sir Harry Lewis (24 January 1984 – 14 April 2009) was an American-bred Thoroughbred racehorse and sire best known for his win in the 1987 Irish Derby. After finishing second on his only appearance as a two-year-old he won his first two races in 1987 including the Dee Stakes. He finished fourth in The Derby before winning the Irish equivalent, which was then the most valuable race for three-year-olds ever run in Europe. Later that year he was placed in both the Matchmaker International and the Rothman' International. He ran twice in Europe as a four-year-old before being transferred to the United States where he had limited success. Sir Harry Lewis made little impact as a breeding stallion in North America, but made his mark as a sire of jumpers in Europe.

== Background ==
Sir Harry Lewis was an "angular, quite good-looking" bay colt with a small white star and white socks on his hind legs bred in Kentucky by H. Joseph Allen and Regent Farm. He was sired by the dual Prix de l'Arc de Triomphe winner Alleged out of the mare Sue Babe. Alleged a successful stallion, and a strong influence for stamina: his best winners included Miss Alleged, Shantou, Legal Case (Champion Stakes) Law Society and Midway Lady. Sue Babe was a sprinter who raced only as a two-year-old, winning the Fashion Stakes, before becoming a successful broodmare: in addition to Sir Harry Lewis she produced several other winners including the New York Stallion Series winner Sir Richard Lewis. Sue Babe was a half-sister to the Monmouth Oaks winner Sharp Belle, whose descendants include the Preakness Stakes winner Lookin At Lucky.

Sir Harry Lewis was acquired by the American businessman Howard Kaskel and sent to Europe where he was trained by Barry Hills at Lambourn in Berkshire.

== Racing career ==
=== 1986: two-year-old season ===
Sir Harry Lewis began his racing career in a minor race over seven furlongs at Doncaster Racecourse in October 1986. Starting the third favourite in a twelve-runner field, he took the lead approaching the final furlong before being beaten a head by the filly Good Sailing.

=== 1987: three-year-old season ===
On his debut as a three-year-old Sir Harry Lewis won a sixteen-runner maiden race over 10 1/2 furlongs at Haydock Park Racecourse in April. The colt was then moved up in class for the Listed Dee Stakes over a similar distance at Chester Racecourse in May and won again, beating the odds-on favourite Shady Heights. On 3 June Sir Harry Lewis, ridden by John Reid, started a 66/1 outsider for the 208th running of the Derby Stakes over 1 1/2 miles at Epsom Downs Racecourse. The colt raced just behind the leaders before turning into the straight in eighth place and moved into fourth with two furlongs left to run. He stayed on without looking likely to win, finishing fourth of the nineteen runners behind Reference Point, Most Welcome and Bellotto.

The Irish Derby, run at the Curragh on 27 June, was the second most valuable race run in Europe in 1987, behind the Prix de l'Arc de Triomphe, and ahead of the Epsom Derby. The prize money was boosted by sponsorship from Budweiser, an increase in initial entry fees and a new supplementary entry stage in December 1986. Despite the prize on offer the race attracted only eight runners and the field was not considered a strong one. Sir Harry Lewis started 6/1 fourth favourite behind the French colt Sadjiyd who had won the Prix Noailles and the Prix Hocquart before running poorly at Epsom. Most Welcome was second choice in the betting ahead of Entitled who had finished second in the Irish 2,000 Guineas and fifth in the Derby, whilst Naheez (runner up in the Prix du Jockey Club) started at 10/1. The start of the race was delayed by fifty minutes after a hoax bomb warning led to the partial evacuation of the grandstand. Partnered again by Reid, Sir Harry Lewis took the lead a quarter of a mile from the finish and held off a persistent challenge from Naheez to win by three quarters of a length, with a gap of four lengths back to Entitled in third place. Commenting on the pre-race drama, Reid said "He relaxed just fine. He was not worried by the long wait".

The colt raced four times in 1987 after his Irish win, but did not win again. In July he was matched against older horses for the first time and finished seventh of the nine runners behind Reference Point in the King George VI and Queen Elizabeth Stakes at Ascot Racecourse. In the following month he was brought back in distance for the Matchmaker International over 10 1/2 furlongs at York and finished third behind Triptych and Ascot Knight. In his last two appearances of the year, Sir Harry Lewis was sent to North America to compete for major international prizes. In the Rothman' International at Woodbine Racetrack on 18 October he started 5.4/1 second favourite and finished third behind the French challengers River Memories and Sadjiyd. On 21 November at Hollywood Park Racetrack the colt contested the fourth running of the Breeders' Cup Turf. Starting at odds of 20/1 he finished eleventh of the fourteen runners behind Theatrical.

=== 1988: four-year-old season ===
On his debut as a four-year-old, Sir Harry Lewis was made the 7/4 favourite for the John Porter Stakes at Newbury Racecourse on 16 April. He finished second of the eight runners behind Alwasmi, to whom he was conceding six pounds. Three weeks later he started 4/7 favourite for the Ormonde Stakes on heavy ground at Chester but failed to reproduce his best form. He was beaten more than twenty lengths behind the outsider Mr Pintips, and finished the race lame.

Sir Harry Lewis was then transferred permanently to the United States where he raced in the ownership of Kaskel's Sugar Maple Stable and was trained by D. Wayne Lukas. In his three remaining races in 1988, the colt finished fifth in the Sunset Handicap in July, won a handicap race at Del Mar on 19 August and ran fifth in the Del Mar Handicap in September.

=== 1989: five-year-old season ===
Sir Harry Lewis remained in training as a five-year-old but failed to win in three races. After finishing third in an allowance race at Hollywood Park in April he was off the track until October, when he ran eighth in the John Henry Stakes at Meadowlands and sixth in an allowance race at Aqueduct.

== Assessment ==
In 1986 the independent Timeform organisation gave Sir Harry Lewis a rating of 81 p (the p indicating that he was expected to make more than normal improvement). In their annual Racehorses of 1986 Timeform described him as "sure to improve and win a race". In the International Classification for 1987, Sir Harry Lewis was given a rating of 122, thirteen pounds behind the top-rated Reference Point. Timeform rated him on 127, twelve pounds behind Reference Point, their Horse of the Year. In Racehorses of 1987 Timeform described him as being a "far from fluent mover" but "game and genuine".

== Stud record ==
Sir Harry Lewis started his stallion career at Walmac Farm in Kentucky, before moving to Kaskel's Sugar Maple Farm in New York. He later moved back to Europe where he stood at the Wood Farm Stud in Shropshire. He died of a heart attack at Wood Farm on 14 April 2009 at the age of 25. Sir Harry Lewis had his greatest success as a sire of National Hunt after his return to Europe. His offspring have included Mighty Man (Long Walk Hurdle, Liverpool Hurdle), Diamond Harry (Hennessy Gold Cup, Challow Novices' Hurdle, Altcar Novices' Chase), Harry Topper (Charlie Hall Chase, Denman Chase, Worcester Novices' Chase) and Restless Harry (West Yorkshire Hurdle, Rendlesham Hurdle).

== Pedigree ==
Pedigree of Sir Harry Lewis (USA), bay stallion, 1984
Sire Alleged (USA) 1974	Hoist The Flag (USA); 1968	Tom Rolfe	Ribot
Sire Alleged (USA) 1974	Hoist The Flag (USA); 1968	Tom Rolfe	Pocahontas
Sire Alleged (USA) 1974	Hoist The Flag (USA); 1968	Wavy Navy	War Admiral
Sire Alleged (USA) 1974	Hoist The Flag (USA); 1968	Wavy Navy	Triomphe
Sire Alleged (USA) 1974	Princess Pout (USA); 1966	Prince John	Princequillo
Sire Alleged (USA) 1974	Princess Pout (USA); 1966	Prince John	Not Afraid
Sire Alleged (USA) 1974	Princess Pout (USA); 1966	Determined Lady	Determine
Sire Alleged (USA) 1974	Princess Pout (USA); 1966	Determined Lady	Tumbling
Dam Sue Babe (USA) 1978	Mr. Prospector (USA); 1970	Raise a Native	Native Dancer
Dam Sue Babe (USA) 1978	Mr. Prospector (USA); 1970	Raise a Native	Raise You
Dam Sue Babe (USA) 1978	Mr. Prospector (USA); 1970	Gold Digger	Nashua
Dam Sue Babe (USA) 1978	Mr. Prospector (USA); 1970	Gold Digger	Sequence
Dam Sue Babe (USA) 1978	Sleek Dancer (USA); 1968	Northern Dancer	Nearctic
Dam Sue Babe (USA) 1978	Sleek Dancer (USA); 1968	Northern Dancer	Natalma
Dam Sue Babe (USA) 1978	Sleek Dancer (USA); 1968	Victorine	My Babu
Dam Sue Babe (USA) 1978	Sleek Dancer (USA); 1968	Victorine	Pandora (Family:9-f)
