= Zarkandar =

Irish-bred Thoroughbred racehorse

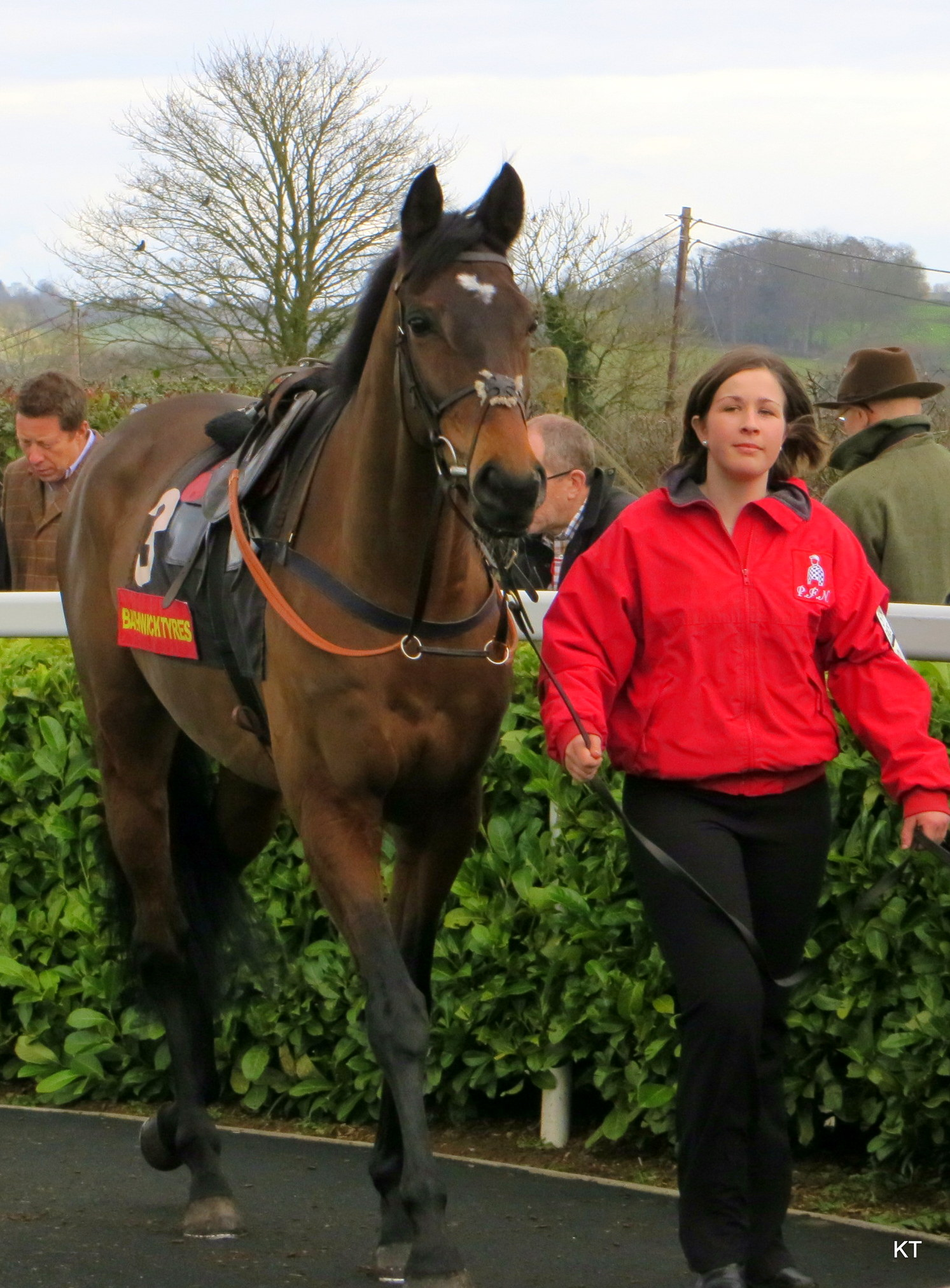
- Zarkander at the Kingwell Hurdle, Wincanton, February 2013.
- Sire: Azamour
- Grandsire: Night Shift
- Dam: Zarkasha
- Damsire: Kahyasi
- Sex: Gelding
- Foaled: 20 April 2007
- Country: Ireland
- Colour: Bay
- Breeder: Dominick Vallely
- Owner: Aga Khan IV; Potensis Limited & Chris Giles
- Trainer: Alain de Royer-Dupré; Paul Nicholls
- Record: 35: 11-6-4; 3: 1-1-1 (flat); 32: 10-5-3 (hurdles)
- Earnings: £911,734

Major wins
- Adonis Juvenile Novices' Hurdle (2011); Triumph Hurdle (2011); Anniversary 4-Y-O Novices' Hurdle (2011); Betfair Hurdle (2012); Elite Hurdle (2012); International Hurdle (2012); Kingwell Hurdle (2013); Aintree Hurdle (2013); Grand Prix d'Automne (2014); Rendlesham Hurdle (2017)

Zarkandar (foaled 20 April 2007) is an Irish-bred, British-trained Thoroughbred racehorse who competed in National Hunt races. A half-brother to the Prix de l'Arc de Triomphe winner Zarkava he won one of his three flat races before being gelded and becoming a specialist hurdler. He was the best juvenile hurdler of the 2010/2011 National Hunt season when he won the Adonis Juvenile Novices' Hurdle, Triumph Hurdle and Anniversary 4-Y-O Novices' Hurdle. In the following season he won the Betfair Hurdle but finished unplaced in the Champion Hurdle. In the 2012/2013 he won the Elite Hurdle, International Hurdle, Kingwell Hurdle and Aintree Hurdle, although he again ran disappointingly in the Champion Hurdle. He failed to win when campaigned over longer distances in 2013/2014 but began his next season by winning the Grand Prix d'Automne in France. He continued to compete in Graded hurdle races, winning the Rendlesham Hurdle in February 2017 and was retired the following year. He won 11 of his 35 races and earned over £900,000 in prize money.

== Background ==
Zarkandar, a bay horse with a white star, was bred in Ireland by the Aga Khan, as were both his parents. His sire Azamour was trained by John Oxx to win four Group One races including the King George VI and Queen Elizabeth Stakes in 2005, a year in which he was named European Champion Older Horse. Apart from Zarkandar, his best runner has been the Prix de Diane winner Valyra. Zarkandar's dam Zarkasha never raced but has been a highly successful broodmare, most notably producing the undefeated Prix de l'Arc de Triomphe winner Zarkava. Zarkandar's breeding was suggestive of a middle-distance flat racer, and he was accordingly sent to France to be trained by Alain de Royer Dupre at Chantilly.

== Racing career ==
=== 2010: flat season ===
Zarkandar was unraced as a two-year-old before appearing three times in 2010 in the ownership of his breeder, the Aga Khan. On his debut in July he was ridden by Gerald Mosse and led from the start to win a 2400 metre race at Clairefontaine. In August he was moved up in distance and started favourite for two races at Deauville Racecourse in which he finished second and third.

At the end of the year Zarkandar was sold privately to Potensis Limited and Chris Giles as a jumping prospect. He was transferred to England to be trained by Paul Nicholls at Ditcheat in Somerset. As part of his preparation for his new racing career, Zarkandar was gelded.

=== 2010/2011 National Hunt season ===
Zarkandar made his first appearance as a hurdler on 26 February 2011, less than three weeks before the start of the Cheltenham Festival. In the Grade 2 Adonis Juvenile Hurdle at Kempton Park Racecourse he was ridden by Daryl Jacob and started at odds of 8/1, with another of Nicholls' French imports, Tonic Mellyse being made favourite. Zarkandar was restrained by Jacob in the early stages before taking the lead two hurdles from the finish and winning by two and a quarter lengths from Molotof. On 18 March Zarkandar was one of twenty-three four-year-olds to contest the Grade 1 Triumph Hurdle at Cheltenham. Jacob positioned the French horse just behind the leaders before moving up to challenge for the lead approaching the final hurdle. Zarkandar pulled ahead on the run-in to win by two and a quarter lengths from the Irish-trained filly Unaccompanied, with Grandouet in third place. Zarkandar's third and final start of the season came in the Grade 1 Anniversary Hurdle at Aintree Racecourse in April when he started the 4/6 favourite. Ridden by Ruby Walsh, he was left in the lead when Grandouet fell at the second last hurdle and won by one and a quarter lengths from Kumbeshwar.

=== 2011/2012 National Hunt season ===
As in the previous season, Zarkandar did not appear in public until February. At Newbury Racecourse he carried a weight of 155 pounds against nineteen opponents in the Grade 3 Betfair Hurdle. Ridden by Walsh, he appeared to be struggling after making a mistake at the third last hurdle, but stayed on to take the lead on the run-in and won from Get Me Out Of Here to remain unbeaten over hurdles. A month later, Zarkandar started at odds of 9/1 for his first attempt at the Champion Hurdle, in which he was part of a four-strong Nicholls entry which also included Rock On Ruby, Brampour and Celestial Halo. He appeared outpaced three hurdles from the finish, and although he made progress in the straight he finished fifth of the ten runners behind Rock On Ruby, Overturn, Hurricane Fly and Binocular. Zarkandar's second season as a hurdler ended disappointingly as he fell when favourite for the Aintree Hurdle in April.

=== 2012/2013 National Hunt season ===
Zarkandar began his third season as a hurdler in November 2012, when he was assigned top weight of 164 pounds in the Elite Hurdle at Wincanton Racecourse. He was ridden by Daryl Jacob while the other Nicholls runner Prospect Wells (runner-up in the 2008 Grand Prix de Paris) was partnered by Walsh. Zarkandar tracked Prospect Wells throughout the race and prevailed by a neck from his stable companion, to whom he was conceding seventeen pounds. A month later, Zarkandar was matched against Rock On Ruby and Grandouet in the International Hurdle at Cheltenham. He got the better of a sustained struggle with Rock On Ruby and then held off the late challenge of Grandouet to win by two lengths.

Zarkandar had his final trial for the 2013 Champion Hurdle in the Kingwell Hurdle at Wincanton on 13 February. Starting at odds of 1/3 he took the lead after the second last hurdle and won by four and a half lengths from Khyber Kim. The BBC's correspondent described the performance as "dominant" while Nicholls called it a "proper job" and emphasised his view that the gelding would be well-suited to Cheltenham's testing, uphill finish. Zarkandar started the 7/2 second favourite for the Champion Hurdle, but made little impression in the closing stages and finished fourth of the nine runners behind Hurricane Fly. Zarkandar ended his season in the Aintree Hurdle on 4 April when he raced for the first time in blinkers. He led from the start and held the late challenge of the Neptune Hurdle winner The New One to win by half a length. After the race, Nicholls said that the use of blinkers had brought about a "phenomenal improvement" and indicated that the horse would be moved up further in distance with the 2014 World Hurdle as his long-term objective.

=== 2013/2014 National Hunt season ===
Zarkandar began the new season in the Ascot Hurdle on 23 November, when he finished second to the Irish mare Annie Power, to whom he was conceding eleven pounds. Three weeks later, Zarkandar met The New One again at level weights in the International Hurdle at Kempton. He led the field approaching the last but was outpaced by The New One on the run in and beaten six lengths. On 1 January, in extremely difficult weather conditions, Zarkandar started 2/1 second favourite behind Annie Power in a three-runner field for the Dornan Engineering Hurdle at Cheltenham. He proved no match for the mare in the closing stages as was beaten eight lengths into second place. Zarkandar again prepared for the 2014 Cheltenham Festival in the Kingwell Hurdle but after taking the lead approaching the second last hurdle he was overtaken on the run-in and beaten half a length by the eight-year-old Melodic Rendezvous.

At Cheltenham on 14 March, Zarkandar was moved up in distance for the Grade I World Hurdle over three miles. Starting a 14/1 outsider, he made steady progress in the closing stages without ever looking likely to win, and finished fourth of the ten runners behind More Of That, Annie Power and At Fishers Cross. One place behind was Zarkandar's stable companion Big Buck's, who was attempting to win the race for a fifth time. He was then sent to compete in France where he finished sixth behind Thousand Stars in the Prix La Barka and third to Gemix in the Grande Course de Haies d'Auteuil.

=== 2014/2015 National Hunt season ===
Zarkandar began the new season by returning to France for the Grade 1 Grand Prix d'Automne over 4800 metres at Auteuil on 1 November. Ridden by the French jockey Vincent Cheminaud he started the 16/5 second favourite behind Gemix, with the other runners including Reve de Sivola, winner of the race in 2013. He won the race by five lengths from Gemix, with Dulce Leo three lengths back in third. On his return to England, Zarkandar started odds-on favourite for the Long Walk Hurdle at Ascot. He tracked the pace-setting Reve de Sivola before taking the lead at the second last and going into a two length lead. On the run-in, however, he faltered when challenged by the resurgent Reve de Sivola and was beaten a head. After the race owner Chris Giles commented "I don't blame the jockey, but maybe he would do it differently if he did it again and wait a bit longer".

On 12 March, Zarkandar started 6/1 second favourite behind his stablemate Saphir de Rheu for the World Hurdle at the Cheltenham Festival. He appeared to be travelling smoothly behind the leaders until the second last hurdle when he made a bad jumping error and almost fell. He made up some of the lost ground in the straight and finished third behind Cole Harden and Saphir de Rheu. On his final appearance of the season he finished fourth behind Whisper, Cole Harden and Un Temps Pour Tout in the Liverpool Hurdle in April.

== Pedigree ==
Pedigree of Zarkandar (IRE), bay gelding, 2007
Sire Azamour (IRE) 2001	Night Shift (USA); 1980	Northern Dancer	Nearctic
Sire Azamour (IRE) 2001	Night Shift (USA); 1980	Northern Dancer	Natalma
Sire Azamour (IRE) 2001	Night Shift (USA); 1980	Ciboulette	Chop Chop
Sire Azamour (IRE) 2001	Night Shift (USA); 1980	Ciboulette	Windy Answer
Sire Azamour (IRE) 2001	Asmara (USA); 1993	Lear Fan	Roberto
Sire Azamour (IRE) 2001	Asmara (USA); 1993	Lear Fan	Wac
Sire Azamour (IRE) 2001	Asmara (USA); 1993	Anaza	Darshaan
Sire Azamour (IRE) 2001	Asmara (USA); 1993	Anaza	Azaarika
Dam Zarkasha (IRE) 1999	Kahyasi (IRE); 1985	Ile de Bourbon	Nijinsky
Dam Zarkasha (IRE) 1999	Kahyasi (IRE); 1985	Ile de Bourbon	Roseliere
Dam Zarkasha (IRE) 1999	Kahyasi (IRE); 1985	Kadissya	Blushing Groom
Dam Zarkasha (IRE) 1999	Kahyasi (IRE); 1985	Kadissya	Kalkeen
Dam Zarkasha (IRE) 1999	Zarkana (IRE); 1992	Doyoun	Mill Reef
Dam Zarkasha (IRE) 1999	Zarkana (IRE); 1992	Doyoun	Dumka
Dam Zarkasha (IRE) 1999	Zarkana (IRE); 1992	Zarna	Shernazar
Dam Zarkasha (IRE) 1999	Zarkana (IRE); 1992	Zarna	Zahra (Family: 9-c)
