= Cole Harden =

Irish racehorse (foaled 2009)

- Racing silks of Mr and Mrs J Hutchinson and Jill Eynon
- Sire: Westerner
- Grandsire: Danehill
- Dam: Nosie Betty
- Damsire: Alphabatim
- Sex: Gelding
- Foaled: 22 April 2009
- Country: Ireland
- Colour: Bay
- Breeder: J O'Callaghan
- Owner: Mr & Mrs J Hutchinson; Jill Eynon & Robin Eynon
- Trainer: Brian Srorey; Warren Greatrex
- Record: 24: 6-7-5
- Earnings: £329,397

Major wins
- West Yorkshire Hurdle (2014); World Hurdle (2015)

Cole Harden (foaled 22 April 2009) is an Irish-bred, British-trained racehorse who competes in National Hunt racing. After winning both of his National Hunt Flat races in 2013 he went on to win novice hurdle races at Fontwell and Newbury in the 2013/2014 National Hunt season. In the following season he emerged as a leading staying hurdler, winning the West Yorkshire Hurdle before achieving his biggest success in the World Hurdle.

== Background ==
Cole Harden is a bay gelding bred in Kilworth, Cork, Ireland by Mrs Josephine O'Callaghan. He was sired by Westerner, an outstanding flat racing stayer whose wins included the Gold Cup, the Prix du Cadran and the Prix Royal Oak. As a breeding stallion he has mainly been used as a sire of jumpers, with the best of his offspring including Western Warhorse who won the Arkle Challenge Trophy in 2014. Cole Harden's dam Nosie Betty, was an unraced daughter of the William Hill Futurity winner Alphabatim.

Cole Harden is named after the character played by Gary Cooper in the 1940 film The Westerner. He was initially sent into training with Brian Storey in Cumbria.

== Racing career ==
=== 2012/2013 National Hunt season: National Hunt flat races ===
Cole Harden began his racing career in National Hunt Flat races in 2012. On 22 March he started 2/1 favourite for the race on heavy ground at Sedgefield Racecourse and won by three and a half lengths from Clan Gathering. In August, he won a similar event at Worcester Racecourse, beating Western Way by one and a quarter lengths.

=== 2013/2014 National Hunt season: novice hurdles ===
In the summer of 2013, the gelding was bought privately by Jill & Robin Eynon. He was moved south to be trained by Warren Greatrex, a former jockey who operates from Fred Winter's former stable at Uplands in Lambourn.

Cole Harden made his debut over hurdles at Fontwell Racecourse on 23 October 2013 when he started at odds of 4/1 and finished fourth behind Shantou Magic. In November at the same course he recorded his first win over obstacles when starting 9/4 favourite and winning by four lengths from Westaway. In January, Cole Harden followed up his previous success when winning a novice hurdle at Newbury Racecourse, beating Full Shift by eight lengths after leading from the start. On his next appearance Cole Harden finished second to Un Temps Pour Tout at Ascot Racecourse in February. In March Cole Harden was sent to the Cheltenham Festival for the first time and contested the Baring Bingham Novices' Hurdle over two miles and five furlongs. Starting a 40/1 outsider he led until the third last flight but faded in the closing stages and finished seventh behind Faugheen. On his final appearance of the season, Cole Harden was moved up in distance for the Sefton Novices' Hurdle at Aintree Racecourse in April. He finished second of the eighteen runners, four lengths behind the Nicky Henderson-trained Beat That.

=== 2014/2015 National Hunt season: hurdle races ===
On his first appearance against more experienced hurdlers, Cole Harden contested the West Yorkshire Hurdle at Wetherby Racecourse on 1 November 2014. Starting at odds of 9/4, he led from the tart and won by eight lengths and two and a half lengths from Medinas and At Fishers Cross (winner of the Spa Novices' Hurdle and the Sefton Novices' Hurdle). Greatrex described the winner as "a really tough, solid horse". Cole Harden met Medinas again in the Long Distance Hurdle at Newbury Racecourse four weeks later. Attempting to concede eight pounds to Medinas, he finished second, seven lengths behind his rival and eighteen lengths ahead of the 2014 Stayers Hurdle winner More Of That. On 1 January, the gelding contested the Dornan Engineering Hurdle over two and a half miles at Cheltenham. He led from the start but was overtaken approaching the last and finished third behind Rock On Ruby and Vaniteux. Later that month, Cole Harden started at odds of 9/2 for the Grade 1 Cleeve Hurdle over three miles at Cheltenham. After racing prominently in the early stages he made several jumping errors and finished fourth of the six runners behind Saphir de Rheu, Reve de Sivola and Un Temps Pour Tout. After this race the gelding underwent a soft palate operation to correct a breathing problem.

On 12 March 2015 at the Cheltenham Festival, Cole Harden started at odds of 14/1 for the 43rd running of the World Hurdle. His opponents included Saphir de Rheu, Reve de Sivola, Un Temps Pour Tout, At Fishers Cross and Zarkandar. Sheehan sent the gelding into the lead from the start and was never headed. He opened up a clear advantage approaching the final flight and won by three and a quarter lengths from Saphir de Rheu, who was in turn three and a quarter lengths clear of Zarkandar. After the race an emotional Greatrex commented "I’m small, I’m a youngster at this. I’ve got nine runners here, we’re breaking through — we’re trying to compete with the big guys and hopefully this will help. We’ve beaten the best. You look at the next two horses behind and they’re trained by Paul Nicholls ... unbelievable". He also paid tribute to his former mentor David "The Duke" Nicholson, saying "I am sure the Duke is looking down from somewhere with pride and I hope Fred would have been proud as well". At Aintree Racecourse in April Cole Harden attempted to follow up in the Liverpool Hurdle but after leading for most of the way he was overtaken approaching the final flight and finished second to Whisper, who had won the race in 2014.

=== Later career ===
2324P/23

On 28 November 2015 Cole Harden began his season in the Long Distance Hurdle at Newbury and finished third to Thistlecrack to whom he was conceding four pounds in weight. In the Relkeel Hurdle over two and a half miles at Cheltenham on 1 January he came home third behind Camping Ground and Lil Rockerfeller after leading until the third last hurdle. At Cheltenham in March he attempted to defend his Stayers' Hurdle championship and started at odds of 15/2 in a twelve-runner field. He took the lead from the start and maintained his advantage until the second last but was outpaced thereafter and came home fourth behind Thistlecrack, Alpha Des Obeaux and Bobs Worth.

== Pedigree ==
Pedigree of Cole Harden (IRE), bay gelding, 2009
Sire Westerner (GB) 1999	Danehill; 1986	Danzig	Northern Dancer
Sire Westerner (GB) 1999	Danehill; 1986	Danzig	Pas de Nom
Sire Westerner (GB) 1999	Danehill; 1986	Razvana	His Majesty
Sire Westerner (GB) 1999	Danehill; 1986	Razvana	Spring Adieu
Sire Westerner (GB) 1999	Walensee (IRE); 1982	Troy	Petingo
Sire Westerner (GB) 1999	Walensee (IRE); 1982	Troy	La Milo
Sire Westerner (GB) 1999	Walensee (IRE); 1982	Warsaw	Bon Mot
Sire Westerner (GB) 1999	Walensee (IRE); 1982	Warsaw	War Path
Dam Nosie Betty (IRE) 2002	Alphabatim (USA); 1981	Verbatim	Speak John
Dam Nosie Betty (IRE) 2002	Alphabatim (USA); 1981	Verbatim	Well Kept
Dam Nosie Betty (IRE) 2002	Alphabatim (USA); 1981	Morning Games	Grey Dawn
Dam Nosie Betty (IRE) 2002	Alphabatim (USA); 1981	Morning Games	Major Play
Dam Nosie Betty (IRE) 2002	Cromogue Lady (IRE); 1982	Golden Love	Above Suspicion
Dam Nosie Betty (IRE) 2002	Cromogue Lady (IRE); 1982	Golden Love	Syncopation
Dam Nosie Betty (IRE) 2002	Cromogue Lady (IRE); 1982	Gina Rose	Prince Hansel
Dam Nosie Betty (IRE) 2002	Cromogue Lady (IRE); 1982	Gina Rose	Solbaygina
