= More of That =

Irish-bred Thoroughbred racehorse

More Of That
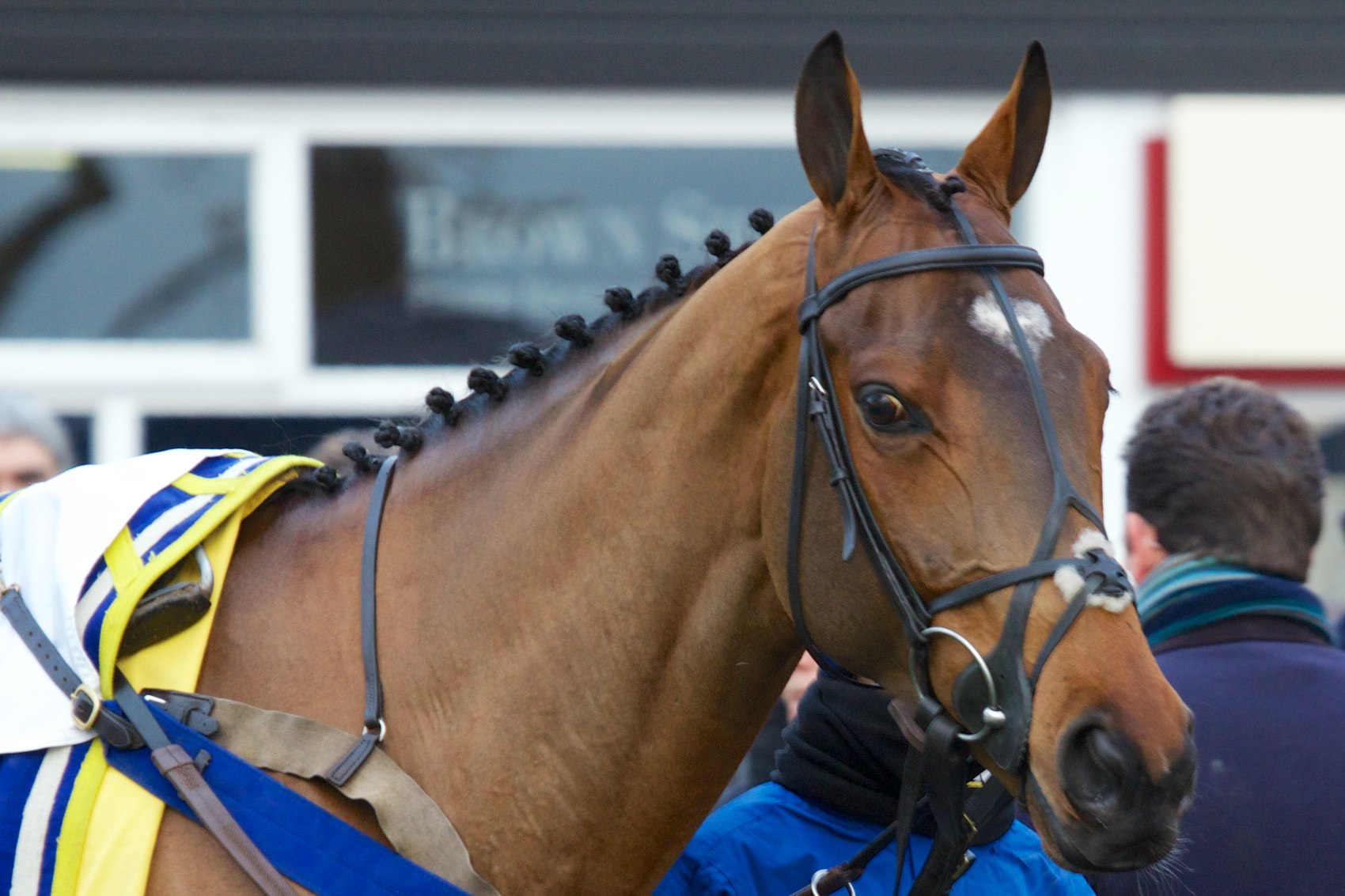
- More of That at Haydock Park in November 2013.
- Sire: Beneficial
- Grandsire: Top Ville
- Dam: Guigone
- Damsire: Esprit du Nord
- Sex: Gelding
- Foaled: 22 February 2008
- Country: Ireland
- Colour: Bay
- Breeder: Eleanor Hadden
- Owner: J. P. McManus
- Trainer: Jonjo O'Neill
- Record: 14:7-0-3; 8:2-0-2 (Chases); 6:5-0-1 (Hurdles)
- Earnings: £277,321

Major wins
- Relkeel Hurdle (2013); World Hurdle (2014)

More Of That (foaled- 22 February 2008) is an Irish-bred, British-trained Thoroughbred racehorse, who competes in National Hunt racing. After winning his only race as a novice he won two handicaps and the Grade II Relkeel Hurdle before taking the Grade I World Hurdle at the 2014 Cheltenham Festival.

== Background ==
More Of That is a bay gelding with a white star bred in Ireland by the County Wicklow-based Eleanor Hadden. He was sired by Beneficial (1990–2013), a British horse who won the Dee Stakes and the King Edward VII Stakes in 1993 and the Scottish Classic in the following year before becoming a successful National Hunt stallion. Apart from More of That, his best winners include Realt Dubh (Powers Gold Cup), Benefficient (Paddy Power Dial-A-Bet Chase) and Cooldine (RSA Chase). His dam, Guigone is a French-bred mare who has produced several other winners.

In November 2008, More Of That was sent as a foal to the Tattersalls Ireland National Hunt sale, where he was bought for €28,000 by the bloodstock agent John O'Byrne on behalf of J. P. McManus. The horse was sent into training with Jonjo O'Neill at Jackdaw Castle in Gloucestershire.

== Racing career ==
=== 2012/2013 National Hunt season: Novice hurdles ===
More Of That made his racecourse debut in a maiden hurdle race at Folkestone Racecourse on 4 December 2012. Ridden by Richie McLernon he started a 20/1 outsider in a seven-runner field. He took the lead at the last hurdle despite a jumping error and won "very easily" by two and three quarter lengths from the 8/11 favourite Utopian, with a gap of twenty-two lengths back to the third-placed horse.

=== 2013/2014 National Hunt season ===
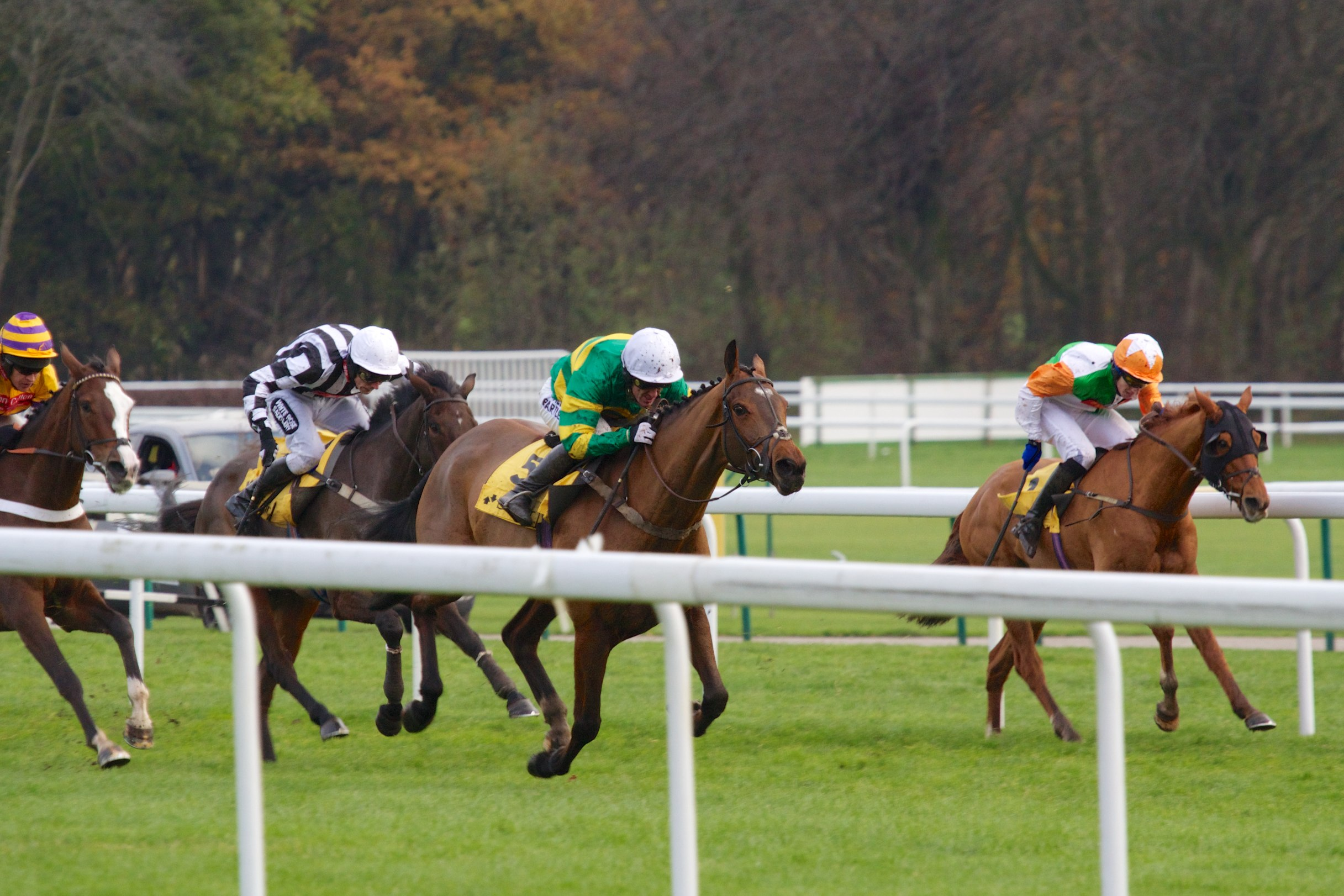
More of That wins at Haydock Park in November 2013.

After a break of eleven months, More Of That returned in a two and a half mile handicap hurdle at Wetherby on 2 November 2013, in which he started 3/1 favourite despite carrying top weight of 165 pounds. Ridden by A. P. McCoy, he jumped the last hurdle in second place before staying on to take the lead in the closing stages and won by a length from Twelve Roses. Three weeks later, with McCoy again in the saddle, the gelding was carried 156 pounds in a more valuable handicap at Haydock Park Racecourse. He looked outpaced in the straight and was in sixth place jumping the last, but produced a strong finish to win by two lengths from the Barry Geraghty-ridden Blue Fashion. On 14 December, More of That was moved up in class for the Grade II Relkeel Hurdle over two and a half miles at Cheltenham Racecourse and started 11/4 second favorite in a field which included the Grade I-winning Irish mare Glens Melody and the French champion Gemix, winner of the Grande Course de Haies d'Auteuil. McCoy made his challenge at the last hurdle and More of That took the lead on the run-in to win by two and a quarter lengths from the Paul Nicholls-trained Salubrious.

At Cheltenham on 13 March, More Of That started at odds of 15/2 for the Grade I World Hurdle over a distance of three miles. He was ridden by Geraghty as McCoy had opted to ride the other McManus runner At Fishers Cross. The betting was headed by the mare Annie Power, unbeaten at that time in ten races and Big Buck's who had won the race on four previous occasions, while the other contenders included the Grade I winners Zarkandar, Celestial Halo and Reve de Siola. Geraghty held the gelding up in the early stages before moving up to dispute the lead approaching the final hurdle. More Of That got the better of Annie Power on the run-in and won by one and a half lengths, with At Fishers Cross five lengths back in third. After the race Geraghty said: "He still is a little bit innocent but he's got an engine. I always felt I had the finish". Jonjo O'Neill commented "We were very pleased with the horse and he was in great old form. Jumping the last, I thought he would keep galloping. I had a little doubt in my mind that Annie Power might not quite get home but she gave us a fair fright".

=== 2014/2015 National Hunt season ===
On his first and only appearance in the 2014/2015 season, More Of That started the 4/7 favourite against five opponents in the Long Distance Hurdle at Newbury Racecourse. After tracking the leaders for most of the way, he began to struggle approaching the final hurdle and faded in the closing stages, sustaining his first defeat as he finished third behind Medinas and Cole Harden. The gelding underwent an operation to correct breathing problems but bled after an exercise gallop in February and was subsequently ruled out for the rest of the season.

=== 2015/2016 National Hunt season ===
Almost a year later on 13 November 2015, More Of That debuted in his first Chase race of class 2 against a field of 6 other novice chasers. He traveled and jumped well mid-pack and made his move in the home straight to win easily by 2½ lengths. He had one further outing before the Cheltenham festival and that was Raymond Mould Memorial Novices' Chase on 12 December in which he was again victorious. In the 2016 RSA Chase at the Cheltenham Festival, he placed third to Blaklion despite having burst a blood vessel.

=== 2016/2017 National Hunt season ===
In the following season More Of That was campaigned against more experienced steeplechasers and began his season in the BetVictor Gold Cup on 12 November when he was pulled-up on the run-in. He produced an improved effort on 4 December, finishing third to Josses Hill and Tea For Two in the Peterborough Chase. In his next two races he contested Grade I chases in Ireland, finishing sixth in the Lexus Chase and then unseating his rider in the Irish Gold Cup. On 17 March 2017 More Of That made his third appearance at the Cheltenham Festival when he started at odds of 14/1 for the Cheltenham Gold Cup. He never looked likely to win but stayed on in the closing stages and came home sixth of the ten finishers behind Sizing John.

== Pedigree ==
Pedigree of More Of That, bay gelding, 2008
Sire Beneficial (GB) 1990	Top Ville (IRE); 1976	High Top	Derring-Do
Sire Beneficial (GB) 1990	Top Ville (IRE); 1976	High Top	Camenae
Sire Beneficial (GB) 1990	Top Ville (IRE); 1976	Sega Ville	Charlottesville
Sire Beneficial (GB) 1990	Top Ville (IRE); 1976	Sega Ville	La Sega
Sire Beneficial (GB) 1990	Youthful (FR); 1980	Green Dancer	Nijinsky
Sire Beneficial (GB) 1990	Youthful (FR); 1980	Green Dancer	Green Valley
Sire Beneficial (GB) 1990	Youthful (FR); 1980	First Bloom	Primera
Sire Beneficial (GB) 1990	Youthful (FR); 1980	First Bloom	Flower Dance
Dam Guigone (FR) 1990	Esprit du Nord (USA); 1980	Lyphard	Northern Dancer
Dam Guigone (FR) 1990	Esprit du Nord (USA); 1980	Lyphard	Goofed
Dam Guigone (FR) 1990	Esprit du Nord (USA); 1980	Rajput Princess	Prince Taj
Dam Guigone (FR) 1990	Esprit du Nord (USA); 1980	Rajput Princess	Royal Arrival
Dam Guigone (FR) 1990	Stena (IRE); 1979	Ashmore	Luthier
Dam Guigone (FR) 1990	Stena (IRE); 1979	Ashmore	Almyre
Dam Guigone (FR) 1990	Stena (IRE); 1979	Madonna	White Label
Dam Guigone (FR) 1990	Stena (IRE); 1979	Madonna	Azalea (Family 20-a)
