= Long Distance Hurdle =

Hurdle horse race in Britain

Long Distance Hurdle
2025
Impose Toi	Strong Leader	Take No Chances

Previous years
2024
Strong Leader	Monmiral	Langer Dan
2023
Dashel Drasher	Paisley Park	Flight Deck
2022
Champ	Paisley Park	Thomas Darby
2021
Thomas Darby	On The Blind Side	Paisley Park

2020-2011
2020
Thyme Hill	Paisley Park	Mcfabulous
2019
Paisley Park	Thistlecrack	The Worlds End
2018
Unowhatimeanharry	Clyne	The Mighty Don
2017
Beer Goggles	Unowhatimeanharry	Taquin Du Seuil
2016
Unowhatimeanharry	Ballyoptic	Menorah
2015
Thistlecrack	Deputy Dan	Cole Harden
2014
Medinas	Cole Harden	More of That
2013
Celestial Halo	Medinas	Reve De Sivola
2012
Big Buck's	Reve De Sivola	Fox Appeal
2011
Big Buck's	Five Dream	Pettifour

2010-2001
2010
Big Buck's	Duc De Regniere	Arcalis
2009
Big Buck's	Lough Derg	Duc De Regniere
2008
Duc De Regniere	Mobaasher	Pettifour
2007
Inglis Drever	Special Envoy	Kasbah Bliss
2006
Inglis Drever	Irish Wolf	Dom d'Orgeval
2005
Inglis Drever	Baracouda	Crystal d'Ainay
2004
Baracouda	Crystal d'Ainay	Kadara
2003
Baracouda	Deano's Beeno	Springfield Scally
2002
Bacchanal	Native Emperor	Deano's Beeno
2001
Historic	Spendid	First Gold

2000-1990
2000
Deano's Beeno	Celtic Native	Earthmover
1999
Deano's Beeno	Just Nip	Anzum
1998
Princeful	Shooting Light	The Proms
1997
Go-Informal	Antapoura	Spring Marathon
1996
What A Question	Antapoura	Trainglot
1995
Conquering Leader	Island Jewel	Simpson
1994
Hebridean	Spring Marathon	Meditator
1993
Triple Witching	Sweet Duke	Burgoyne
1992
Tyrone Bridge	Burgoyne	Ambuscade
1991
Cab on Target	Burgoyne	Trapper John
1990
Trapper John	Bradbury Star	Ikdam

The Long Distance Hurdle is a Grade 2 National Hunt hurdle race in Great Britain which is open to horses aged four years or older. It is run at Newbury over a distance of about 3 miles (3 miles and 52 yards, or 4,876 metres), and during its running there are twelve hurdles to be jumped. The race is scheduled to take place each year in late November or early December.

The event was established in 1990.

== Records ==
Most successful horse (4 wins):

- Big Buck's – 2009, 2010, 2011, 2012

Leading jockey (5 wins):

- Tony McCoy – Deano's Beeno (1999, 2000), Baracouda (2004), Duc de Regniere (2008), Big Buck's (2010)

Leading trainer (5 wins):

- Paul Nicholls – Big Buck's (2009, 2010, 2011, 2012), Celestial Halo (2013)
- Nicky Henderson - Conquering Leader (1995), Bacchanal (2002), Duc de Regniere (2008), Champ (2022), Impose Toi (2025)

== Winners ==
Year	Winner	Age	Jockey	Trainer
1990	Trapper John	6	Charlie Swan	Mouse Morris
1991	Cab on Target	5	Peter Niven	Mary Reveley
1992	Tyrone Bridge (Note: Burgoyne finished first in 1992, but he was relegated to second place after a stewards' inquiry)	6	Richard Dunwoody	Martin Pipe
1993	Triple Witching	7	Adrian Maguire	David Nicholson
1994	Hebridean	7	Adrian Maguire	David Nicholson
1995	Conquering Leader	6	John Kavanagh	Nicky Henderson
1996	What a Question	8	Graham Bradley	Mouse Morris
1997	Go-Informal	6	Eddie Callaghan	Malcolm Jefferson
1998	Princeful	7	Richard Dunwoody	Jenny Pitman
1999	Deano's Beeno	7	Tony McCoy	Martin Pipe
2000	Deano's Beeno	8	Tony McCoy	Martin Pipe
2001	Historic	5	Carl Llewellyn	Tom George
2002	Bacchanal	8	Mick Fitzgerald	Nicky Henderson
2003	Baracouda	8	Thierry Doumen	François Doumen
2004	Baracouda	9	Tony McCoy	François Doumen
2005	Inglis Drever	6	Graham Lee	Howard Johnson
2006	Inglis Drever	7	Tony Dobbin	Howard Johnson
2007	Inglis Drever	8	Denis O'Regan	Howard Johnson
2008	Duc de Regniere	6	Tony McCoy	Nicky Henderson
2009	Big Buck's	6	Ruby Walsh	Paul Nicholls
2010	Big Buck's	7	Tony McCoy	Paul Nicholls
2011	Big Buck's	8	Ruby Walsh	Paul Nicholls
2012	Big Buck's	9	Ruby Walsh	Paul Nicholls
2013	Celestial Halo	9	Daryl Jacob	Paul Nicholls
2014	Medinas	7	Richard Johnson	Alan King
2015	Thistlecrack	7	Tom Scudamore	Colin Tizzard
2016	Unowhatimeanharry	8	Barry Geraghty	Harry Fry
2017	Beer Goggles	6	Richard Johnson	Richard Woollacott
2018	Unowhatimeanharry	10	Barry Geraghty	Harry Fry
2019	Paisley Park	7	Aidan Coleman	Emma Lavelle
2020	Thyme Hill	6	Richard Johnson	Philip Hobbs
2021	Thomas Darby	8	Sean Bowen	Olly Murphy
2022	Champ	10	Jonjo O'Neill Jr	Nicky Henderson
2023	Dashel Drasher	10	Rex Dingle	Jeremy Scott
2024	Strong Leader	7	Sean Bowen	Olly Murphy
2025	Impose Toi	7	Nico de Boinville	Nicky Henderson

== See also ==
- Horse racing in Great Britain
- List of British National Hunt races
