= Adonis Juvenile Hurdle =

Hurdle horse race in Britain

Adonis Juvenile Hurdle
2026
La Luna Artista	One Horse Town	Fantasy World

Previous years
2025
Mambonumberfive	St Pancras	Mondo Man
2024
Kalif Du Berlais	Givemefive	Captain Marvellous
2023
Nusret	Perseus Way	Rare Middleton
2022
Knight Salute	Teddy Blue	Graystone
2021
Tritonic	Casa Loupi	Paso Doble

2020-2011
2020
Solo	Fujimoto Flyer	Tremwedge
2019
Fusil Raffles	Beat The Judge	Praeceps
2018
Redicean	Malaya	Beau Gosse
2017
Master Blueyes	Evening Hush	Fidux
2016
Zubayr	Azzuri	Khezerabad
2015
Beltor	All Yours	Bivouac
2014
Activial	Commissioned	Solar Impulse
2013
Irish Saint	Vasco Du Ronceray	L'unique
2012
Baby Mix	Sadler's Risk	Dark And Dangerous
2011
Zarkandar	Molotof	Kumbeshwar

2010-2001
2010
Soldatino	Toubab	Ultimate
2009
Hebridean	Saticon	Helium
2008
Binocular	Pierrot Lunaire	Zanir
2007
Punjabi	Parrain	Poquelin
2006
Kasbah Bliss	Blazing Bailey	Twist Magic
2005
Penzance	Amarula Ridge	Zalda
2004
Trouble at Bay	Locksmith	Shuhood
2003
Well Chief	Mughas	Duke of Earl
2002
Giocomo	Sud Bleu	Tempo D'Or
2001
Bilboa	Janus Du Cochet	Bow Strada

2000-1991
2000
Snow Drop	Architect	Delayed
1999
Katarino	Scarlet Pimpernel	Temper Lad
1998
Fataliste	Supply And Demand	Real Estate
1997
L'Opera	Kerawi	Summer Spell
1996
Zabadi	Mistinguett	Our Kris
1995
Greenback	Silver Wedge	Serious Danger
1994
Mysilv	Winter Forest	Legal Artist
1993
Amazon Express	Top Spin	Eden's Close
1992
Qualitair Sound	Pharly Story	Hashar
1991
Marlingford	Bottles	Cornwall Prince

1990-1988
1990
Philosophos	Calicon	Carbisdale
1989
Royal Derbi	Nomadic Way	Magnus Pym
1988
Russian Affair	Combermere	Calapaez

The Adonis Juvenile Hurdle is a Grade 2 National Hunt hurdle race in Great Britain which is open to horses aged four years. It is run at Kempton Park over a distance of about 2 miles (3,219 metres), and during its running there are eight hurdles to be jumped. The race is for novice hurdlers, and it is scheduled to take place each year in late February.

The event serves as a principal trial for the Triumph Hurdle in March. Since 1988, six horses have won both races – Mysilv, Katarino, Snow Drop, Penzance, Soldatino and Zarkandar. Prior to 1994, the race was known as the Tote Placepot Hurdle.

== Records ==
Leading jockey (3 wins):

- Adrian Maguire – Mysilv (1994), Zabadi (1996), L'Opera (1997)
- Mick Fitzgerald – Katarino (1999), Punjabi (2007), Binocular (2008)

Leading trainer (6 wins):

- Paul Nicholls – Hebridean (2009), Zarkandar (2011), Irish Saint (2013), Zubayr (2016), Solo (2020), Kalif Du Berlais (2024)

== Winners ==
Year	Winner	Jockey	Trainer
1965	Bronzino	Richard Broadway	George Todd
1966	Harwell	Bobby Beasley	Arthur Thomas
1967	Acrania	Bobby Beasley	Guy Harwood
1968	St Cuthbert	Terry Biddlecombe	Fred Rimell
1969	Rabble Rouser	Ron Atkins	Reg Akehurst
1970	Frozen Alive	Stan Mellor	Harry Thomson Jones
1971	Melody Rock	Terry Biddlecombe	Ryan Price
1972	Official	R Bailey	Toby Balding
1973	Padlocked	Paul Kelleway	Ryan Price
1974	Supreme Halo	Jeff King	Ron Smyth
1975	Wovoka	Richard Floyd	Ian Dudgeon
1976	Soldier Rose	Paul Kelleway	Ryan Price
1977	Rathconrath	John Francome	Fred Winter
1978	Bootlaces	Paul Leach	David Barons
1979	Pollardstown	Philip Blacker	Stan Mellor
1980	Hill of Slane	Andy Turnell	Alan Jarvis
1981	Ra Tapu	Robert Hughes	Philip Mitchell
1982	Morice	Andy Turnell	Richard Hannon Sr.
1983	Jorge Miguel	Robert Earnshaw	Gavin Pritchard-Gordon
1984	Clarinbridge	B Nolan	Jim Bolger (Ir)
1985	Abandoned due to frost
1986	Abandoned due to frost
1987	Framlington Court	Dermot Browne	Peter Walwyn
1988	Russian Affair	Dale McKeown	Reg Akehurst
1989	Royal Derbi	Hywel Davies	Neville Callaghan
1990	Philosophos	Willie McFarland	John Baker
1991	Marlingford	Derek Morris	Joan Jordan
1992	Qualitair Sound	John Quinn	John Bottomley
1993	Amazon Express	Jamie Osborne	Reg Akehurst
1994	Mysilv	Adrian Maguire	David Nicholson
1995	Greenback	Peter Hobbs	Philip Hobbs
1996	Zabadi	Adrian Maguire	David Nicholson
1997	L'Opera	Adrian Maguire	David Nicholson
1998	Fataliste	Tony McCoy	Martin Pipe
1999	Katarino	Mick Fitzgerald	Nicky Henderson
2000	Snow Drop	Thierry Doumen	François Doumen
2001	Bilboa	Thierry Doumen	François Doumen
2002	Giocomo	Liam Cooper	Jonjo O'Neill
2003	Well Chief	Tony McCoy	Martin Pipe
2004	Trouble at Bay	Robert Thornton	Alan King
2005	Penzance	Robert Thornton	Alan King
2006 (Note: The 2006 running took place at Sandown Park as Kempton was closed for redevelopment)	Kasbah Bliss	Arnaud Duchêne	François Doumen
2007	Punjabi	Mick Fitzgerald	Nicky Henderson
2008	Binocular	Mick Fitzgerald	Nicky Henderson
2009	Hebridean	Ruby Walsh	Paul Nicholls
2010	Soldatino	Barry Geraghty	Nicky Henderson
2011	Zarkandar	Daryl Jacob	Paul Nicholls
2012	Baby Mix	Paddy Brennan	Tom George
2013	Irish Saint	Ruby Walsh	Paul Nicholls
2014	Activial	Noel Fehily	Harry Fry
2015	Beltor	Tom O'Brien	Robert Stephens
2016	Zubayr	Nick Scholfield	Paul Nicholls
2017	Master Blueyes	Tom Bellamy	Alan King
2018	Redicean	Wayne Hutchinson	Alan King
2019	Fusil Raffles	Daryl Jacob	Nicky Henderson
2020	Solo	Harry Cobden	Paul Nicholls
2021	Tritonic	Adrian Heskin	Alan King
2022	Knight Salute	Paddy Brennan	Milton Harris
2023	Nusret	Daryl Jacob	Joseph O'Brien
2024	Kalif Du Berlais	Harry Cobden	Paul Nicholls
2025	Mambonumberfive	Ben Jones	Ben Pauling
2026	La Luna Artista	Ciaran Gethings	Jane Williams

== See also ==
- Horse racing in Great Britain
- List of British National Hunt races
