= Iris's Gift =

British-bred Thoroughbred racehorse

- Sire: Gunner B
- Dam: Shirley's Gift
- Damsire: Scallywag
- Sex: Gelding
- Foaled: 1997
- Country: Great Britain
- Colour: Grey
- Breeder: Mrs R Crank
- Owner: Robert lester
- Trainer: Jonjo O'Neill
- Record: 25: 14-5-0
- Earnings: £339,503

Major wins
- Winter Bumper (2002); Bristol Novices' Hurdle (2002); Prestige Novices' Hurdle (2003); Sefton Novices' Hurdle (2003); Liverpool Hurdle (2004); World Hurdle (2004)

Iris's Gift was a National Hunt racehorse trained in Britain by Jonjo O'Neill.

== Racing career ==
=== National Hunt Flat races ===
He made his racecourse debut in August 2001, where he won a National Hunt flat race at Worcester Racecourse. He followed that up with another success at the same track the following month, before winning a Grade 2 National Hunt flat race at Newbury Racecourse in February. Iris's Gift lost his unbeaten record on his next start, where he finished fifth in the Champion Bumper at the Cheltenham Festival. He had one more race that season, where he finished second in Champion Standard Open NH Flat Race at Aintree Racecourse in April.

=== Novice Hurdles ===
Iris's Gift was immediately sent novice hurdling the following season and started with a winning debut over the obstacles in October at Bangor. He followed that up with another win at Cheltenham Racecourse the following month before winning the Grade Bristol Novices' Hurdle in December 2002. After winning his next two starts, including the Prestige Novices' Hurdle, he was stepped up to Grade 1 level in the Cheltenham Festival. Rather than contest one of the top novice hurdles, he contested the World Hurdle as a novice, where he finished a 3/4 length second to Baracouda. In his final appearance of the season, he won the Sefton Novices' Hurdle by 8 lengths as the 10/11 favourite.

=== Senior Hurdles ===
The 2003/04 season didn't see Iris's Gift re-appear until February, where he finished second in the Pertemps Handicap Hurdle Qualifier at Haydock Park Racecourse. He then went to the Cheltenham Festival, where he reversed last year's result when beating Baracouda in the World Hurdle. That was followed by victory in the Liverpool Hurdle at Aintree Racecourse in April before he went to Punchestown, where he finished second to Rhinestone Cowboy in the Punchestown Stayers Hurdle.

=== Steeplechasing ===
The 2004/05 season saw Iris's Gift make just the one appearance. He was sent novice chasing that season in the Ascot Chase, finishing fifth behind It Takes Time.

The 2005/06 season saw Iris's Gift continue over fences. Under the jockeyship of Tony McCoy, he competed a hat trick over fences between September and October. He was then stepped up in class, where he finished a 13 length second in the Worcester Novices' Chase at odds on. On his next start, in February 2006, he fell in a novice chase at Warwick Racecourse. In his final appearance of the season, Iris's Gift went to the Cheltenham Festival in an attempt to win the Cheltenham Gold Cup in his novice season, but he was pulled up in the race.

The following season (2006/07) proved to be his final season of racing. He made his seasonal reappearance in the Charlie Hall Chase, where he finished a 30-length fifth behind Our Vic, before finishing a distant fifth to Kauto Star in the Betfair Chase. That race was the final one of his career, and Iris's Gift was retired.
