= West Yorkshire Hurdle =

Hurdle horse race in Britain

West Yorkshire Hurdle
2026
Strong Leader	Lavida Adiva	Take No Chances

Previous years
2025
Strong Leader	Take No Chances	Doddiethegreat
2024
Beacon Edge	Twig	Kateira
2023
Botox Has	Red Risk	Dashel Drasher
2022
Proschema	Thomas Darby	Threeunderthrufive
2021
Indefatigable	Proschema	Paisley Park

2020-2011
2020
Roksana	Next Destination	Kildisart
2019
The Worlds End	Unowhatimeanharry	Two Taffs
2018
Nautical Nitwit	Old Guard	Monbeg Theatre
2017
Colin's Sister	Wholestone	Lil Rockerfeller
2016
Silsol	Native River	Lil Rockerfeller
2015
Kilcooley	Rock on Ruby	Aqalim
2014
Cole Harden	Medinas	At Fishers Cross
2013
Tidal Bay	Medinas	Captain Sunshine
2012
Tidal Bay	Crack Away Jack	Smad Place
2011
Restless Harry	Fair Along	What A Friend

2010-2001
2010
Fair Along	Kayf Aramis	Tidal Bay
2009
Fair Along	Pettifour	No Refuge
2008
Pettifour	Mobaasher	No Refuge
2007
Black Jack Ketchum	Faasel	Lough Derg
2006
Redemption	My Way de Solzen	Tees Components
2005
Inglis Drever	Redemption	Tees Components
2004
Telemoss	Crystal d'Ainay	St Matthew
2003
Gralmano	Royal Emperor	Rostropovich
2002
Brother Joe	Boss Doyle	Spendid
2001
Boss Doyle	Spendid	Historic

2000-1990
2000
Boss Doyle	Earthmover	The Proms
1999
Silver Wedge	Upgrade	Paddy's Return
1998
Marello	Nigel's Lad	Kerawi
1997
Pridwell	Mistinguett	Only two ran
1996
Trainglot	What A Question	Difficult Times
1995
Cab On Target	Avro Anson	Great Marquess
1994
Halkopous	Avro Anson	Triple Witching
1993
Deb's Ball	Sweet Duke	Burgoyne
1992
Burgoyne	Nomadic Way	Better Times Ahead
1991
Cab On Target	Calapaez	Yorkshire Holly
1990
Battalion	Broctune Grey	Judges Fancy

The West Yorkshire Hurdle is a Grade 2 National Hunt hurdle race in Great Britain that is open to horses aged four years or older. It is run at Wetherby, West Yorkshire, over a distance of about 3 miles (3 miles and 26 yards, or 4,852 metres), and during its running, there are twelve hurdles to be jumped. The race is scheduled to take place each year in late October or early November.

The event was established in 1990, and it was initially contested over 3 miles. It was extended to about 3 miles and 1 furlong (5,029 metres) in 1992. The race was sponsored by John Smith's from 2000 to 2012 and run as the John Smith's Hurdle. Since 2013, it has been sponsored by Bet365. It was reduced back to 3 miles in 2015.

== Winners ==
Year	Winner	Age	Jockey	Trainer
1990	Battalion	6	Peter Scudamore	Charlie Brooks
1991	Cab on Target	5	Peter Niven	Mary Reveley
1992	Burgoyne	6	Lorcan Wyer	Peter Easterby
1993	Deb's Ball	7	James Moffatt	Dudley Moffatt
1994	Halkopous	8	Richard Dunwoody	Mark Tompkins
1995	Cab on Target	9	Peter Niven	Mary Reveley
1996	Trainglot	9	Richard Dunwoody	Jimmy FitzGerald
1997	Pridwell	7	Tony McCoy	Martin Pipe
1998	Marello	7	Peter Niven	Mary Reveley
1999	Silver Wedge	8	Mick Fitzgerald	Nicky Henderson
2000	Boss Doyle	8	Charlie Swan	Mouse Morris
2001	Boss Doyle	9	David Casey	Mouse Morris
2002	Brother Joe	8	Jim Culloty	Philip Hobbs
2003	Gralmano	8	Graham Lee	Kevin Ryan
2004	Telemoss	10	Tony Dobbin	Nicky Richards
2005	Inglis Drever	6	Graham Lee	Howard Johnson
2006	Redemption	11	Timmy Murphy	Nigel Twiston-Davies
2007	Black Jack Ketchum	8	Tony McCoy	Jonjo O'Neill
2008	Pettifour	6	Paddy Brennan	Nigel Twiston-Davies
2009	Fair Along	7	Rhys Flint	Philip Hobbs
2010	Fair Along	8	Rhys Flint	Philip Hobbs
2011	Restless Harry	7	Henry Oliver	Robin Dickin
2012	Tidal Bay	11	Ruby Walsh	Paul Nicholls
2013	Tidal Bay	12	Sam Twiston-Davies	Paul Nicholls
2014	Cole Harden	5	Gavin Sheehan	Warren Greatrex
2015	Kilcooley	6	Richard Johnson	Charlie Longsdon
2016	Silsol	7	Jack Sherwood	Paul Nicholls
2017	Colin's Sister	6	Paddy Brennan	Fergal O'Brien
2018	Nautical Nitwit	9	Thomas Dowson	Philip Kirby
2019	The Worlds End	8	Adrian Heskin	Tom George
2020	Roksana	8	Harry Skelton	Dan Skelton
2021	Indefatigable	8	Daryl Jacob	Paul Webber
2022	Proschema	7	Harry Skelton	Dan Skelton
2023	Botox Has	7	Caoilin Quinn	Gary Moore
2024	Beacon Edge	10	Danny Gilligan	Gordon Elliot
2025	Strong Leader	8	Sean Bowen	Olly Murphy
2025	Strong Leader	9	Sean Bowen	Olly Murphy

== See also ==
- Horse racing in Great Britain
- List of British National Hunt races
