= Inglis Drever =

British-bred Thoroughbred racehorse

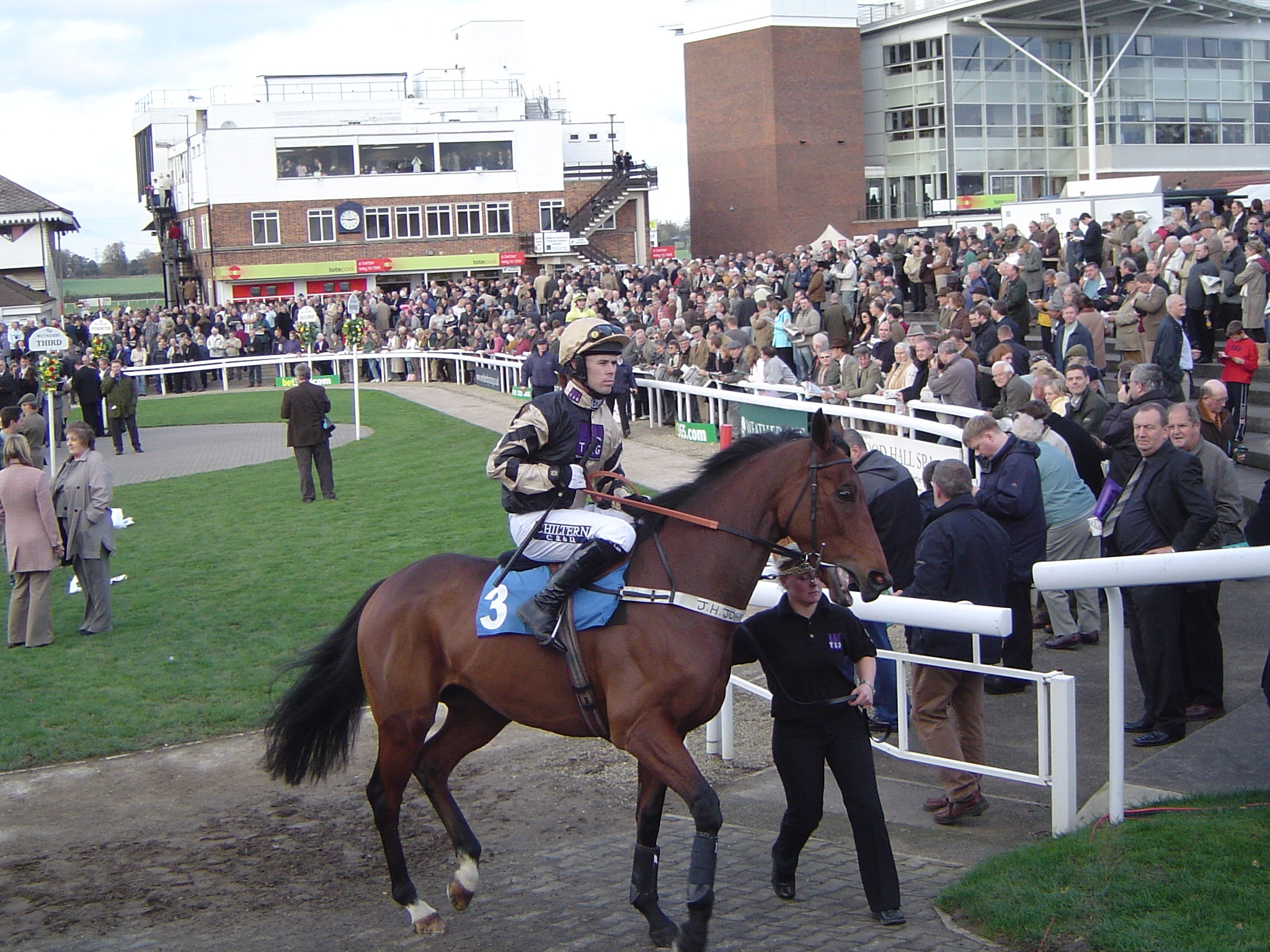
- Sire: In The Wings
- Dam: Cormorant Creek
- Damsire: Gorytus
- Sex: Gelding
- Foaled: 18 March 1999
- Country: Great Britain
- Colour: Bay
- Breeder: R J McAlpine & D O Pickering
- Owner: Graham & Andrea Wylie
- Trainer: Howard Johnson
- Record: 35: 17-8-3
- Earnings: £796,952

Major wins
- Winter Novices' Hurdle (2003); Leamington Novices' Hurdle (2004); Champion Hurdle Trial (2005); Kingwell Hurdle (2005); World Hurdle (2005, 2007, 2008); John Smith's Hurdle (2005); Long Distance Hurdle (2005, 2006, 2007); Cleeve Hurdle (2008)

Inglis Drever (18 March 1999 – October 2009) was a champion racehorse trained in the North of England by Howard Johnson. He was one of the most successful hurdle racing horses to date and won the World Hurdle three times, bettered only by the former champion Big Buck's. He is seen by many as having been one of the greatest staying hurdlers of all time.

== Racing career ==
=== Flat racing ===
His career started as a Flat horse, where he was trained by Sir Mark Prescott and won 4 of his 12 starts under Flat rules.

=== National Hunt racing ===
It was over hurdles, however, that Inglis Drever excelled, winning on his first run over hurdles in November 2003 at Aintree.

Victory in the 'Fighting Fifth Hurdle' at Newcastle had many believing that the Champion Hurdle was a serious prospect for the horse. Inglis Drever won the first-ever running of the '2005 Ladbroke World Hurdle'. After suffering a career-threatening injury with a fall at Newbury, he was unable to defend his title 2006. (My Way De Solzen)

He did, however, return to the track and reclaimed 'The World Hurdle' crown in both 2007 and 2008. In 2008, he was the oldest horse at the time to win The World/Stayers Hurdle. He was ridden by three different jockeys on all three of his Cheltenham Festival wins.

The 10-year-old retired from racing in January 2009. Found lying in a field at his owner's home, the horse underwent surgery for a serious bout of colic the following day, but had to be euthanized. 16 October 2009.

== Pedigree ==
Pedigree of Inglis Drever (GB), bay gelding, 1999
Sire In The Wings (GB) 1986	Sadler's Wells (USA); 1981	Northern Dancer	Nearctic
Sire In The Wings (GB) 1986	Sadler's Wells (USA); 1981	Northern Dancer	Natalma
Sire In The Wings (GB) 1986	Sadler's Wells (USA); 1981	Fairy Bridge	Bold Reason
Sire In The Wings (GB) 1986	Sadler's Wells (USA); 1981	Fairy Bridge	Special
Sire In The Wings (GB) 1986	High Hawk (IRE); 1980	Shirley Heights	Mill Reef
Sire In The Wings (GB) 1986	High Hawk (IRE); 1980	Shirley Heights	Hardiemma
Sire In The Wings (GB) 1986	High Hawk (IRE); 1980	Sunbittern	Sea Hawk
Sire In The Wings (GB) 1986	High Hawk (IRE); 1980	Sunbittern	Pantoufle
Dam Cormorant Creek (GB) 1987	Gorytus (USA); 1980	Nijinsky	Northern Dancer
Dam Cormorant Creek (GB) 1987	Gorytus (USA); 1980	Nijinsky	Flaming Page
Dam Cormorant Creek (GB) 1987	Gorytus (USA); 1980	Glad Rags	High Hat
Dam Cormorant Creek (GB) 1987	Gorytus (USA); 1980	Glad Rags	Dryad
Dam Cormorant Creek (GB) 1987	Quarry Wood (GB); 1968	Super Sam	Above Suspicion
Dam Cormorant Creek (GB) 1987	Quarry Wood (GB); 1968	Super Sam	Samaria
Dam Cormorant Creek (GB) 1987	Quarry Wood (GB); 1968	Phrygia	Mossborough
Dam Cormorant Creek (GB) 1987	Quarry Wood (GB); 1968	Phrygia	Lenaea (Family: 2-n)

== Retirement and death ==
Inglis Drever picked up a leg injury in the 'Long Distance Hurdle' at Newbury in November 2008. His trainer, Howard Johnson, had reported him to be recovering well. However, in January 2009, Inglis Drever was retired as a result of this injury.

He was euthanised after suffering a bout of colic on 16 October 2009.
