= Worcester Novices' Chase =

Steeplechase horse race in Britain

Worcester Novices' Chase
2022
McFabulous	Thyme Hill	Mortlach

Previous years
2021
Ahoy Senor	Mr Incredible	Flash Collonges

2020-2011
2020
Next Destination	One For The Team	Kalooki
2019
Danny Whizzbang	Reserve Tank	Ardlethen
2018
Santini	Rocky's Treasure	Le Breuil
2017
Elegant Escape	Black Corton	Sir Ivan
2016
Thistlecrack	Bigbadjohn	Ibis Du Rheu
2015
Native River	Un Temps Pour Tout	Port Melon
2014
Carraig Mor	Southfield Theatre	My Silver Cloud
2013
Just A Par	Third Intention	Ardkilly Witness
2012
Harry Topper	Benefficient	Highland Lodge
2011
Grands Crus	Sonofvic	Viking Blond

2010-2001
2010
Aiteen Thirtythree	Voramar Two	Be There in Five
2009
Michel Le Bon	Bench Warrant	Pettifour
2008
Gone To Lunch	Tartak	Hold Em
2007
Joe Lively	Here's Johnny	Only two finished
2006
Boychuk	Gungadu	Wee Robbie
2005
Darkness	Iris's Gift	Unleash
2004
Cornish Rebel	Distant Thunder	St Matthew
2003
Ballycassidy	Native Emperor	Celestial Gold
2002
Lucky Bay	Joly Bey	One Knight
2001
Valley Henry	Frosty Canyon	Southern Star

2000-1990
2000
Shotgun Willy	Take Control	Bindaree
1999
Connor Macleod	Papo Kharisma	Galapiat Du Mesnil
1998
Ocean Hawk	Tiraldo	Farfadet
1997
Ottowa	Eulogy	Edgemoor Prince
1996
Pleasure Shared	Around The Gale	Mony-Skip
1995
Betty's Boy	Cherrynut	Gospel
1993
See More Indians	Run Up The Flag	Craigstown
1992
Barton Bank	Superior Finish	Petty Bridge
1991
Captain Dibble	Bel Course	Tochenka
1990
Killbanon	What's The Crack	Chancery Buck

The Worcester Novices' Chase, later run as the John Francome Novices' Chase, was a Grade 2 National Hunt steeplechase in Great Britain open to horses aged four years or older. It was run at Newbury over a distance of about 2 miles and 7½ furlongs (2 miles 7 furlongs and 86 yards, or 4,706 metres), and during its running there were eighteen fences to be jumped. The race was for novice chasers, and it was scheduled to take place each year in late November or early December.

The race was first run in 1990 and was originally held at Worcester, where it was contested over distances of up to 2 miles and 7½ furlongs and run as the Worcester Novices' Chase. It was transferred to Newbury and extended to its later length in 2000.

In 2017 the race was renamed in honour of John Francome, with the press release explaining that the race "was transferred from Worcester racecourse 17 years ago, so the geographical connection with the Pitchcroft is no longer relevant."

In April 2023 the British Horseracing Authority announced the removal of the race from the 2023/24 programme. The race name was reallocated to another novice chase run at the same meeting and previously titled the Berkshire Novices' Chase.

== Records ==
Leading jockey (4 wins):

- Harry Cobden - Elegant Escape (2017), Danny Whizzbang (2019), Next Destination (2020), McFabulous (2022)

Leading trainer (11 wins):

- Paul Nicholls – See More Indians (1993), Ottowa (1997), Shotgun Willy (2000), Valley Henry (2001), Cornish Rebel (2004), Michel Le Bon (2009), Aiteen Thirtythree (2010), Just A Par (2013), Danny Whizzbang (2019), Next Destination (2020), McFabulous (2022)

== Winners ==
Year	Winner	Age	Jockey	Trainer
1990	Killbanon	8	Simon Earle	Chris Trietline
1991	Captain Dibble	6	Peter Scudamore	Nigel Twiston-Davies
1992	Barton Bank	6	Richard Dunwoody	David Nicholson
1993	See More Indians	6	Graham Bradley	Paul Nicholls
1994	Abandoned because of waterlogged state of course
1995	Betty's Boy	6	Richard Dunwoody	Kim Bailey
1996	Pleasure Shared	8	Chris Maude	Philip Hobbs
1997	Ottowa	7	Timmy Murphy	Paul Nicholls
1998	Ocean Hawk	6	Carl Llewellyn	Nigel Twiston-Davies
1999	Connor Macleod	6	Norman Williamson	Mark Pitman
2000	Shotgun Willy	6	Joe Tizzard	Paul Nicholls
2001	Valley Henry	6	Timmy Murphy	Paul Nicholls
2002	Lucky Bay	6	Jim Culloty	Henrietta Knight
2003	Ballycassidy	7	Richard Johnson	Peter Bowen
2004	Cornish Rebel	7	Tony McCoy	Paul Nicholls
2005	Darkness	6	Barry Fenton	Charles Egerton
2006	Boychuk	5	Richard Johnson	Philip Hobbs
2007	Joe Lively	8	Joe Tizzard	Colin Tizzard
2008	Gone to Lunch	8	Tony McCoy	Jeremy Scott
2009	Michel Le Bon	6	Tony McCoy	Paul Nicholls
2010	Aiteen Thirtythree	6	Noel Fehily	Paul Nicholls
2011	Grands Crus	6	Tom Scudamore	David Pipe
2012	Harry Topper	5	Timmy Murphy	Kim Bailey
2013	Just A Par	6	Daryl Jacob	Paul Nicholls
2014	Carraig Mor	6	Noel Fehily	Alan King
2015	Native River	5	Brendan Powell	Colin Tizzard
2016	Thistlecrack	8	Tom Scudamore	Colin Tizzard
2017	Elegant Escape	5	Harry Cobden	Colin Tizzard
2018	Santini	6	Nico de Boinville	Nicky Henderson
2019	Danny Whizzbang	6	Harry Cobden	Paul Nicholls
2020	Next Destination	8	Harry Cobden	Paul Nicholls
2021	Ahoy Senor	6	Derek Fox	Lucinda Russell
2022	McFabulous	8	Harry Cobden	Paul Nicholls

== See also ==
- Horse racing in Great Britain
- List of British National Hunt races
