= Scudamore Open National Hunt Flat Race =

Flat horse race in Britain

Scudamore Open NH Flat Race
2025
Bass Hunter	Tally Ho Back	Vango Can Go

Previous years
2024
Windbeneathmywings	Moneygarrow	Step Ahead
2023
Let It Rain	Brechin Castle	Celtic Dino
2021
Henri The Second	Authorised Speed	Top Dog

2020-2011
2020
Knappers Hill	Stage Star	Wonderwall
2019
Israel Champ	Soaring Glory	Shantou Express
2018
Eden Du Houx	Imperial Alcazar	The Glancing Queen
2017
Didtheyleaveuoutto	Bullionaire	The Flying Sofa
2016
Western Ryder	Imperial Eloquence	Bang on Frankie
2015
Coeur Blimey	Ballyandy	Full Irish
2014
Supasundae	Yanworth	Rio Treasure
2013
Seven Nation Army	Joshua Lane	On Tour
2012
Captain Cutter	Kings Palace	Tiqris
2011
Shutthefrontdoor	Claret Cloak	Piano Concerto
2008
Red Harbour	Bushwacker	Springfield Raki
2007
Uffa Fox	Hold Em	Shoreacres
2006
Seven Is My Number	Earth Planet	Kia Kaha
2003
Refinement	Corrib Eclipse	Only Wallis
2001
Alvino	Backbeat	Thisthatandtother

The Scudamore Open National Hunt Flat Race is a listed National Hunt flat race in Britain. It is run at Ascot a distance of about 2 miles (1 mile 7 furlongs and 152 yards, or 3,156 metres). The race is scheduled to take place each year in December. Prior to 2011 it was run as a Grade 2 race. The registered name was introduced in 2026, honouring the Scudamore family.

== Winners ==
Year	Winner	Jockey	Trainer
2001	Alvino	Tony McCoy	Henrietta Knight
2002	Abandoned due to fog		
2003	Refinement	Liam Cooper	Jonjo O'Neill
	No race 2004–2005		
2006	Seven Is My Number	Timmy Murphy	David Pipe
2007	Uffa Fox	Noel Fehily	Ben De Haan
2008	Red Harbour	Ruby Walsh	Paul Nicholls
	No race 2009-2010 (Note: The 2009 race was abandoned because of snow) (Note: The 2010 race was abandoned because of frost)		
2011	Shutthefrontdoor	A J Berry (Note: amateur jockey)	Jonjo O'Neill
2012	Captain Cutter	Barry Geraghty	Nicky Henderson
2013	Seven Nation Army	Tom Scudamore	David Pipe
2014	Supasundae	Barry Geraghty	Andrew Balding
2015	Coeur Blimey	Lucy Gardner	Sue Gardner
2016	Western Ryder	Gavin Sheehan	Warren Greatrex
2017	Didtheyleaveuoutto	Barry Geraghty	Nick Gifford
2018	Eden du Houx	Tom Scudamore	David Pipe
2019	Israel Champ	Tom Scudamore	David Pipe
2020	Knappers Hill	Megan Nicholls	Paul Nicholls
2021	Henri The Second	Harry Cobden	Paul Nicholls
2022	Abandoned due to frozen track		
2023	Let It Rain	Harry Skelton	Dan Skelton
2024	Windbeneathmywings	Jack Tudor	David Pipe
2025	Bass Hunter	Freddie Gordon	Chris Gordon

== See also ==
- Horse racing in Great Britain
- List of British National Hunt races
