= Liverpool Hurdle =

Hurdle horse race in Britain

- Class: Grade 1
- Location: Aintree Racecourse; Merseyside, England
- Inaugurated: 1974
- Race type: Hurdle race
- Sponsor: JRL Group
- Website: Aintree

Race information
- Distance: 3m 149y (4,964 metres)
- Surface: Turf
- Track: Left-handed
- Qualification: Four-years-old and up
- Weight: 10 st 8 lb (4yo); 11 st 7 lb (5yo+); Allowances; 7 lb for fillies and mares
- Purse: £250,000 (2022); 1st: £140,325

Liverpool Hurdle
2026
Home By The Lee	Take No Chances	Honesty Policy

Previous years
2025
Hiddenvalley Lake	Strong Leader	Jetara
2024
Strong Leader	Buddy One	Hiddenvalley Lake
2023
Sire Du Berlais	Marie's Rock	Flooring Porter
2022
Sire Du Berlais	Flooring Porter	Champ
2021
Thyme Hill	Roksana	Thomas Darby

2020-2011
2019
If The Cap Fits	Roksana	Apple's Jade
2018
Identity Thief	Wholestone	Sam Spinner
2017
Yanworth	Supasundae	Snow Falcon
2016
Thistlecrack	Shaneshill	Prince of Scars
2015
Whisper	Cole Harden	Un Temps Pour Tout
2014
Whisper	At Fishers Cross	Thousand Stars
2013
Solwhit	Holywell	Smad Place
2012
Big Buck's	Crack Away Jack	Across The Bay
2011
Big Buck's	Grands Crus	Won in the Dark

2010-2001
2010
Big Buck's	Souffleur	Possol
2009
Big Buck's	Mighty Man	Fair Along
2008
Blazing Bailey	Faasel	Inglis Drever
2007
Mighty Man	Black Jack Ketchum	Inglis Drever
2006
Mighty Man	My Way de Solzen	No Refuge
2005
Monet's Garden	Mr Ed	Tumbling Dice
2004
Iris's Gift	Royal Rosa	Aine Dubh
2003
Deano's Beeno	Frosty Canyon	Stromness
2002
Spendid	Brother Joe	Carlovent
2001
Maid Equal	Anzum	Merry Masquerade

2000-1991
2000
Teaatral	Rubhahunish	Audacter
1999
Galant Moss	Lord Jim	Paddy's Return
1998
Marello	Gysart	Ocean Hawk
1997
Trainglot	Pleasureland	Sassiver
1996
Pleasure Shared	Seekin Cash	Gillan Cove
1995
Cab on Target	Bokaro	Spring Marathon
1994
Sweet Glow	Avro Anson	Time for a Run
1993
Sweet Duke	Burgoyne	Avro Anson
1992
Pragada	Trapper John	Sweet Glow
1991
Mole Board	Yaheeb	Upton Park

1990-1988
1990
Battalion	Maelkar	Old Dundalk
1988
Gaye Brief	Pragada	Ruby Flight

The Liverpool Hurdle is a Grade 1 National Hunt hurdle race in Great Britain which is open to horses aged four years or older. It is run at Aintree over a distance of about 3 miles and ½ furlong (3 miles and 149 yards, or 4,964 metres), and during its running there are thirteen hurdles to be jumped. The race is scheduled to take place each year at the Grand National meeting in early April.

== History ==
The event was established in 1974, and it was originally held at Ascot. During the first part of its history it was called the Long Distance Hurdle, and it was initially contested over 3 miles. For a period it was classed at Grade 2 level.

The race was transferred to Aintree in 2004, and since then it has been named after the nearby city of Liverpool. Its original distance has been extended by 110 yards.

The Liverpool Hurdle was promoted to Grade 1 status in 2010, and it currently takes place on the final day of the three-day Grand National meeting. Prior to 2013 it was the opening race on the first day of the meeting.

The field usually includes horses which ran previously in the Stayers' Hurdle, and the last to win both races in the same year was Home By The Lee in 2026.

== Records ==
Most successful horse (4 wins):

- Big Buck's – 2009, 2010, 2011, 2012

Leading jockey (5 wins):

- Peter Scudamore – Gaye Chance (1982), Bajan Sunshine (1985), Gaye Brief (1986), Mrs Muck (1987), Pragada (1992)

Leading trainer (5 wins):

- Martin Pipe – Pragada (1992), Sweet Glow (1994), Galant Moss (1999), Maid Equal (2001), Deano's Beeno (2003)

== Winners ==
Year	Winner	Age	Jockey	Trainer
1974	Moyne Royal	9	Jeff King	Arthur Pitt
1975	Lanzarote	7	Richard Pitman	Fred Winter
1976	Good Prospect	7	Andrew Turnell	John Edwards
1977	Mark Henry	6	Tommy Stack	Bill Elsey
1978	Flame Gun	6	Niall Madden (Note: amateur jockey)	Edward O'Grady
1979	Prominent King	7	Jonjo O'Neill	Peter Easterby
1980	Derring Rose	5	Andrew Turnell	Alan Jarvis
1981	Shell Burst	6	Hywel Davies	Les Kennard
1982	Gaye Chance	7	Peter Scudamore	Mercy Rimell
1983	Sandalay	5	Paul Charlton	Peter Cundell
1984	Alastor O Mavros	5	Hywel Davies	Josh Gifford
1985	Bajan Sunshine	6	Peter Scudamore	Martin Tate
1986	Gaye Brief	9	Peter Scudamore	Mercy Rimell
1987	Mrs Muck	6	Peter Scudamore	Nigel Twiston-Davies
1988	Gaye Brief	11	Dermot Browne	Mercy Rimell
1989	Abandoned due to snow
1990	Battalion	6	Ben de Haan	Charlie Brooks
1991	Mole Board	9	Jamie Osborne	Jim Old
1992	Pragada	9	Peter Scudamore	Martin Pipe
1993	Sweet Duke	6	Carl Llewellyn	Nigel Twiston-Davies
1994	Sweet Glow	7	Richard Dunwoody	Martin Pipe
1995	Cab on Target	9	Peter Niven	Mary Reveley
1996	Pleasure Shared	8	Warren Marston	Philip Hobbs
1997	Trainglot	10	Richard Dunwoody	Jimmy FitzGerald
1998	Marello	7	Peter Niven	Mary Reveley
1999	Galant Moss	5	Tony McCoy	Martin Pipe
2000	Teaatral	6	Dean Gallagher	Charles Egerton
2001	Maid Equal	10	Tom Scudamore	Martin Pipe
2002	Spendid	10	Warren Marston	Alan King
2003	Deano's Beeno	11	Tony McCoy	Martin Pipe
2004	Iris's Gift	7	Barry Geraghty	Jonjo O'Neill
2005	Monet's Garden	7	Tony Dobbin	Nicky Richards
2006	Mighty Man	6	Richard Johnson	Henry Daly
2007	Mighty Man	7	Richard Johnson	Henry Daly
2008	Blazing Bailey	6	Robert Thornton	Alan King
2009	Big Buck's	6	Ruby Walsh	Paul Nicholls
2010	Big Buck's	7	Ruby Walsh	Paul Nicholls
2011	Big Buck's	8	Ruby Walsh	Paul Nicholls
2012	Big Buck's	9	Ruby Walsh	Paul Nicholls
2013	Solwhit	9	Paul Carberry	Charles Byrnes
2014	Whisper	6	Barry Geraghty	Nicky Henderson
2015	Whisper	7	Nico de Boinville	Nicky Henderson
2016	Thistlecrack	8	Tom Scudamore	Colin Tizzard
2017	Yanworth	7	Barry Geraghty	Alan King
2018	Identity Thief	8	Sean Flanagan	Henry de Bromhead
2019	If The Cap Fits	7	Sean Bowen	Harry Fry
	no race 2020 (Note: The 2020 running was cancelled because of the COVID-19 pandemic in the United Kingdom)
2021	Thyme Hill	7	Tom O'Brien	Philip Hobbs
2022	Sire Du Berlais	10	Mark Walsh	Gordon Elliott
2023	Sire Du Berlais	11	Mark Walsh	Gordon Elliott
2024	Strong Leader	7	Sean Bowen	Olly Murphy
2025	Hiddenvalley Lake	8	Darragh O'Keeffe	Henry De Bromhead
2026	Home By The Lee	11	JJ Slevin	Joseph O'Brien

== See also ==
- Horse racing in Great Britain
- List of British National Hunt races
- Recurring sporting events established in 1974 – this race is included under its original title, Long Distance Hurdle.
