= Stayers' Hurdle =

Hurdle horse race in Britain

- Class: Grade 1
- Location: Cheltenham Racecourse; Cheltenham, England
- Race type: Hurdle race
- Sponsor: Paddy Power
- Website: Cheltenham

Race information
- Distance: 2m 7f 213 yards (4,785 metres)
- Surface: Turf
- Track: Left-handed
- Qualification: Four-years-old and up
- Weight: 10 st 9 lb (4yo); 11 st 10 lb (5yo+); Allowances; 7 lb for fillies and mares
- Purse: £325,000 (2023); 1st: £182,878

Stayers' Hurdle
2026
Home By The Lee	Ballyburn	Bob Olinger

Previous years
2025
Bob Olinger	Teahupoo	The Wallpark
2024
Teahupoo	Flooring Porter	Home By The Lee
2023
Sire Du Berlais	Teahupoo	Dashel Drasher
2022
Flooring Porter	Thyme Hill	Paisley Park
2021
Flooring Porter	Sire Du Berlais	Paisley Park

2020-2011
2020
Lisnagar Oscar	Ronald Pump	Bacardys
2019
Paisley Park	Sam Spinner	Faugheen
2018
Penhill	Supasundae	Wholestone
2017
Nichols Canyon	Lil Rockerfeller	Unowhatimeanharry
2016
Thistlecrack	Alpha Des Obeaux	Bobs Worth
2015
Cole Harden	Saphir Du Rheu	Zarkandar
2014
More Of That	Annie Power	At Fishers Cross
2013
Solwhit	Celestial Halo	Smad Place
2012
Big Buck's	Voler La Vedette	Smad Place
2011
Big Buck's	Grands Crus	Mourad

2010-2001
2010
Big Buck's	Time For Rupert	Powerstation
2009
Big Buck's	Punchestowns	Powerstation
2008
Inglis Drever	Kasbah Bliss	Kazal
2007
Inglis Drever	Mighty Man	Blazing Bailey
2006
My Way de Solzen	Golden Cross	Mighty Man
2005
Inglis Drever	Baracouda	Rule Supreme
2004
Iris's Gift	Baracouda	Crystal d'Ainay
2003
Baracouda	Iris's Gift	Limestone Lad
2002
Baracouda	Bannow Bay	It Takes Time

2000-1991
2000
Bacchanal	Limestone Lad	Behrajan
1999
Anzum	Le Coudray	Lady Rebecca
1998
Princeful	Splendid Thyne	Ocean Hawk
1997
Karshi	Anzum	Paddy's Return
1996
Cyborgo	Mysilv	What A Question
1995
Dorans Pride	Cyborgo	Simpson
1994
Balasani	Avro Anson	Minella Lad
1993
Shuil Ar Aghaidh	Pragada	Baydon Star
1992
Nomadic Way	Ubu III	Crystal Spirit
1991
King's Curate	Run For Free	Pragada

1990-1988
1990
Trapper John	Naevog	Bluff Cove
1989
Rustle	Galmoy	Miss Nero
1988
Galmoy	Miss Nero	Bonanza Boy

The Stayers' Hurdle is a Grade 1 National Hunt hurdle race in Great Britain. It is open to horses aged four years or older. It is run on the New Course at Cheltenham over a distance of about 3 miles (2 miles 7 furlongs and 213 yards, or 4,785 metres), with twelve hurdles to be jumped. The race is scheduled to take place each year during the Cheltenham Festival in March.

It is the leading long-distance hurdle event in the National Hunt calendar and the feature race on the third day of the Festival.

== History ==
The inaugural race was run in 1912 at Prestbury Park over 3 miles with £100 (£200 in 1913) prize money to the winner and £10 to the runner-up. It was called "Stayers Selling Hurdle" and was a Weight for Age Selling type of event with the winning horse being sold for £50 after the race. The race was dropped from the festival programme twice during 1928–1929 and in 1939–1945 but in 1946 it replaced the Spa Hurdle which was previously run in 1923 and 1942 over 2 miles. From 1946 to 1967 the Spa Hurdle was run over the same 3 miles until being renamed in 1972 as the Stayers' Hurdle, when it was sponsored by Lloyds Bank. It was backed by Waterford Crystal from 1978 to 1990, and by Bonusprint from 1991 to 2004. The race used to be held on either the Tuesday or the Wednesday of the Festival, but it was moved to the Thursday in 1993.

The title of the race was changed to the World Hurdle when Ladbrokes took over the sponsorship in 2005. Their sponsorship came to an end with the 2015 renewal and the 2016 race was sponsored by Ryanair. In 2017 and 2018 it was sponsored by Sun Bets and the title reverted to the Stayers' Hurdle. In 2019 the race was sponsored by Sun Racing. and Paddy Power has sponsored the race since 2020.

== Records ==
Most successful horse since 1972 (4 wins):

- Big Buck's – 2009, 2010, 2011, 2012

Leading jockey since 1972 (5 wins):

- Ruby Walsh – Big Buck's (2009, 2010, 2011, 2012), Nichols Canyon (2017)

Leading trainer since 1972 (4 wins):

- Paul Nicholls – Big Buck's (2009, 2010, 2011, 2012)

Leading owner since 1972 (4 wins):

- The Stewart Family – Big Buck's (2009, 2010, 2011, 2012)
- Andrea & Graham Wylie – Inglis Drever (2005, 2007, 2008), Nichols Canyon (2017)
- J. P. McManus -Baracouda (2002, 2003), More Of That (2014), Sire Du Berlais (2023)

== List of renewals ==
- Separate divisions of the race indicated by (1) and (2).

Date	Winner	Margin	SP	Age	Jockey	Trainer	Owner	Runners
1912, 13 March	Aftermath	15	11/10F	6	J. W. Pullen (Note: amateur jockey)	Alfred Newey	A. Newey	4
1913, 12 March	Silver Bay	1½	7/4	—	W. Catling	W. Fitton	G. H. Hearman	5
1914, 11 March	Silver Bay	2	5/2F	—	W. Catling	W. Fitton	W. Fitton	12
1915, 10 March	Walkover by Rathduff ridden by Mr. Brabazon							
No races 1916–19 (Note: The Festival was not run in 1916–1919 because of World War I)
1920, 10 March	Wingman	4	4/6F	—	Harry Brown	H. A. Brown	H. Brown	12
1921, 2 March	Flurry	1½	5/4F	—	W. Smith	Stratton	W. Stratton	11
1922, 8 March	Matoppo	8	2/1F	—	Dick Rees	C. Piggott	F. Pedley	12
1923, 7 March	Warwick	1½	4/7F	—	I. Morgan	Tabor	S. Cohen	3
1924, 12 March	The Jester	8	9/4F	6	Keith Piggott	Ernie Piggott	R. Davison	14
1925, 10 March	Warwick	12	9/4F	—	George Duller	W. Payne	Jesse Brown	15
1926, 10 March	Waterford Glass II	2	8/1	11	Eric Foster	Pease	Mrs Pease	17
1927, 9 March	Zarane	1	9/1	13	Billy Speck	Butchers	J. T. Coltman	13
No races 1928–29 ^{[b]}
1930, 11 March	Sobrino	2	8/11F	5	Leslie Butchers	Frank Wootton	S. Wootton	15
no race 1931 (Note: The race was abandoned in 1931 and 1949 because of frost, and in 1937 because of flooding)
1932, 3 March	Icy Kiss	4	7/2	4	W. Hollie	Dick	Mrs D. P. Dick	12
1933, 9 March	Sobrino	2	100/8	8	Mr Frank Usher	Stewart Wight	F. Usher	13
1934, 8 March	Fobdown	1½	6/4F	4	Frenchie Nicholson	J. Reardon	J. Reardon	5
1935, 14 March	Salic Law	20	4/7F	5	Frenchie Nicholson	V. Hobbs	Sangster	4
1936, 12 March	Bishop's Move	1½	3/1	5	Cyril Mitchell	Bill Payne	A. Donn	12
no race 1937
1938, 10 March	Chestnut	1½	7/1	9	Keith Piggott	Ernie Piggott	Mrs E. Johnson	11
No races 1939–45 (Note: The race was dropped from the Festival programme in 1928–29 and 1939–1945)
1946, 14 March (1)	Haze	2	8/1	7	Ron Smyth	Vic Smyth	—	17
1946, 14 March (2)	Tregor	4	100/8	6	Jack Maguire	Ivor Anthony	Sir Victor Sasoon	19
No race 1947 (Note: The 1947 edition was abandoned because of snow and frost.)
1948, 4 March (1)	Spam	2	10/11F	6	Aubrey Brabazon	M. Brabazon	J. Ismay	15
1948, 3 March (2)	Albor	2	6/1	6	Richard Black	W. Payne	—	17
no race 1949
1950, 9 March	Mosquito II	1	9/4	5	Richard Black	De Moraville	Major I. M. Floor	17
1951, 25 April	Whim II	2	100/7	5	Johnnie Gilbert	H. Christie	—	20
1952, 6 March	Sarda II	6	2/1F	7	Bob Turnell	Ivor Anthony	Miss P. Vaughan	15
1953, 5 March	Jack Leal	nk	5/2F	8	Bryan Marshall	Peter Cazalet	—	18
Modern renewals from 1972
1972, 15 March	Parlour Moor	1 1/2	13/2	8	Macer Gifford	Harry Thomson Jones	Charlotte Monkton	11
1973, 14 March	Moyne Royal	1 1/2	10/1	8	David Mould	Arthur Pitt	E. Cook	8
1974, 13 March	Highland Abbe	1 1/2	15/2	8	Richard Smith	Les Kennard	Mrs K. Hankey	15
1975, 12 March	Brown Lad	6	7/4F	9	Tommy Carberry	Jim Dreaper	Mrs Peter Burrell	12
1976, 17 March	Bit of a Jig	3/4	2/1F	8	Dessie Hughes	Mick O'Toole	Mrs Mick O'Toole	12
1977, 16 March	Town Ship	5	5/2	6	Tommy Carberry	Peter Easterby	Pat Muldoon	11
1978, 15 March	Flame Gun	2 1/2	14/1	6	Niall Madden	Edward O'Grady	Mary Kenny	13
1979, 14 March	Lighter	5	14/1	6	Philip Blacker	John Edwards	G. Smith	14
1980, 11 March	Mountrivers	5	7/1	6	Tommy Ryan	Edward O'Grady	B. Burser	19
1981, 17 March	Derring Rose	30	3/1	6	John Francome	Fred Winter	Peter Savill	14
1982, 16 March	Crimson Embers	3/4	2/1F	7	Stuart Shilston	Fulke Walwyn	Sally Smart	11
1983, 15 March	A Kinsman	3/4	50/1	7	Geordie Dun	John Brockbank	Mrs John Brockbank	21
1984, 13 March	Gaye Chance	1 1/2	5/1	9	Sam Morshead	Mercy Rimell	Mary Curtis	14
1985, 12 March	Rose Ravine	nk	5/1F	6	Ricky Pusey	Fulke Walwyn	Sally Smart	22
1986, 11 March	Crimson Embers	15	12/1	11	Stuart Shilston	Fulke Walwyn	Sally Smart	19
1987, 17 March	Galmoy	6	9/1	8	Tommy Carmody	John Mulhern	Miss D. Threadwell	14
1988, 15 March	Galmoy	7	2/1F	9	Tommy Carmody	John Mulhern	Miss D. Threadwell	16
1989, 14 March	Rustle	12	4/1	7	Michael Bowlby	Nicky Henderson	Robert Waley-Cohen	21
1990, 13 March	Trapper John	1 1/2	15/2	6	Charlie Swan	Mouse Morris	Jill Fanning	22
1991, 12 March	King's Curate	nk	5/2F	7	Mark Perrett	Stan Mellor	C. J. Ells	15
1992, 10 March	Nomadic Way	3 1/2	15/2	7	Jamie Osborne	Barry Hills	Robert Sangster	17
1993, 18 March	Shuil Ar Aghaidh	2 1/2	20/1	7	Charlie Swan	Paddy Kiely	Mrs Paddy Kiely	12
1994, 17 March	Balasani (Note: Avro Anson finished first in 1994 a short head in front of Balasani, but he was relegated to second place for causing interference)	shd	9/2J	8	Mark Perrett	Martin Pipe	Mark Smith	14
1995, 16 March	Dorans Pride	5	11/4F	6	Shane Broderick	Michael Hourigan	Tom Doran	11
1996, 14 March	Cyborgo	3/4	8/1	6	David Bridgwater	Martin Pipe	County Stores Ltd	19
1997, 13 March	Karshi	2 1/2	20/1	7	Jamie Osborne	Henrietta Knight	3rd Baron Vestey	17
1998, 19 March	Princeful	2	16/1	7	Rodney Farrant	Jenny Pitman	Robert Hitchins	9
1999, 18 March	Anzum	nk	40/1	8	Richard Johnson	David Nicholson	Old Foresters Partnership	12
2000, 16 March	Bacchanal	1	11/2	6	Mick Fitzgerald	Nicky Henderson	Lady Lloyd-Webber	10
no race 2001 (Note: The 2001 running was cancelled because of a foot-and-mouth crisis)
2002, 14 March	Baracouda	nk	13/8F	7	Thierry Doumen	François Doumen	J. P. McManus	16
2003, 13 March	Baracouda	3/4	9/4JF	8	Thierry Doumen	François Doumen	J. P. McManus	11
2004, 18 March	Iris's Gift	1 1/2	9/2	7	Barry Geraghty	Jonjo O'Neill	Robert Lester	10
2005, 17 March	Inglis Drever	3	5/1	6	Graham Lee	Howard Johnson	Andrea & Graham Wylie	12
2006, 16 March	My Way de Solzen	hd	8/1	6	Robert Thornton	Alan King	Winfield, Longman et al.	20
2007, 15 March	Inglis Drever	3/4	5/1	8	Paddy Brennan	Howard Johnson	Andrea & Graham Wylie	14
2008, 13 March	Inglis Drever	1	11/8	9	Denis O'Regan	Howard Johnson	Andrea & Graham Wylie	17
2009, 12 March	Big Buck's	1 3/4	6/1	6	Ruby Walsh	Paul Nicholls	Stewart Family	14
2010, 18 March	Big Buck's	3 1/4	5/6	7	Ruby Walsh	Paul Nicholls	Stewart Family	14
2011, 17 March	Big Buck's	1 3/4	10/11	8	Ruby Walsh	Paul Nicholls	Stewart Family	13
2012, 15 March	Big Buck's	3/4	5/6	9	Ruby Walsh	Paul Nicholls	Stewart Family	11
2013, 14 March	Solwhit	2 1/2	17/2	9	Paul Carberry	Charles Byrnes	Top of the Hill	13
2014, 13 March	More Of That	1 1/2	15/2	6	Barry Geraghty	Jonjo O'Neill	J. P. McManus	10
2015, 12 March	Cole Harden	3 1/4	14/1	6	Gavin Sheehan	Warren Greatrex	Jill & Robin Eynon	16
2016, 17 March	Thistlecrack	7	EvensF	8	Tom Scudamore	Colin Tizzard	John and Heather Snook	12
2017, 16 March	Nichols Canyon	3/4	10/1	7	Ruby Walsh	Willie Mullins	Andrea & Graham Wylie	12
2018, 15 March	Penhill	2	12/1	7	Paul Townend	Willie Mullins	Tony Bloom	17
2019, 14 March	Paisley Park	2 3/4	11/8F	7	Aidan Coleman	Emma Lavelle	Andrew Gemmell	18
2020, 12 March	Lisnagar Oscar	2	50/1	7	Adam Wedge	Rebecca Curtis	Racing For Fun	15
2021, 18 March	Flooring Porter	3 3/4	12/1	6	Danny Mullins	Gavin Cromwell	Flooring Porter Syndicate	15
2022, 17 March	Flooring Porter	2 3/4	4/1	7	Danny Mullins	Gavin Cromwell	Flooring Porter Syndicate	10
2023, 16 March	Sire Du Berlais	nse	33/1	11	Mark Walsh	Gordon Elliott	J. P. McManus	11
2024, 14 March	Teahupoo	3 3/4	5/4F	7	Jack Kennedy	Gordon Elliott	Robcour	12
2025, 13 March	Bob Olinger	1 3/4	8/1	10	Rachael Blackmore	Henry de Bromhead	Robcour	13
2026, 12 March	Home By The Lee	1 1/4	33/1	11	JJ Slevin	Joseph O'Brien	Sean O'Driscoll	10

== See also ==
- Horse racing in Great Britain
- List of British National Hunt races
