= Mary Reveley =

English racehorse trainer (1940–2017)

Personal information
- Nationality: British
- Born: 22 September 1940 Groundhill Farm, Lingdale, Yorkshire
- Died: 30 October 2017 (aged 77)
- Occupation: Racehorse trainer
- Spouse: George Reveley
- Children: Keith Reveley, John Reveley

Horse racing career
- Sport: Horse racing
- Career wins: 2,010 (Jumps: 1,330; Flat: 680)

Major racing wins
- Future Champion Novices' Chase (1993); Sefton Novices' Hurdle (1995)

Significant horses
- Cab On Target, Marello, Mellottie, Morgan's Harbour

Mary Christiana Reveley (née Allison, 22 September 1940 – 30 October 2017) was an English racehorse trainer. She trained over 2,000 winners in a 26-year career, was the first woman to saddle 100 winners in a calendar year (in 1991), and also became the first female trainer to saddle 50 winners on the flat (in 1992).

== Career ==
She was born on 22 September 1940 to Harry Allison, a farmer, at Groundhill Farm, Lingdale, Yorkshire, where she lived and trained throughout her life. She started training in 1978 and had her first winner, Hello Louis, on 26 May 1979 in a maiden hunter chase at Cartmel. Her first winner on the flat was King Charlemagne at Edinburgh on 11 July 1983.

Until 1981, she trained with a permit, (Note: A permit allows a person to train racehorses owned by themselves or relatives.) and then with a full licence for 23 years. She trained from Groundhill Farm except for a short period in 1989-90, when she was based at Whitewall Cottages, Malton, North Yorkshire.

She had remarkable success with Cab On Target, winning the Grade 1 Future Champion Novices' Chase, the Long Distance Hurdles at Newbury and Ascot, and the West Yorkshire Hurdle twice, among a total of 20 wins from 46 races. Her other Grade 1 winner was Morgan's Harbour in the 1995 Sefton Novices' Hurdle, while Marello was a multiple Grade 2 winner. Other major winners included Seven Towers in the Midlands Grand National in 1997 and Into The Red in the Becher Chase in 1994 and 1996. Peter Niven was a regular jockey for her.

On the flat, she won the Cambridgeshire Handicap in 1991 with 20-time winning former hurdler Mellottie, and the Cesarewitch Handicap with Old Red and Turnpole in 1995 and 1997 respectively.

Her son Keith said of the most successful era, "The yard was absolutely flying in the late 1990s and early 2000s. It was a fantastic time and I don't think we appreciated it as much as we should have at the time. It was an unbelievable run and they were great days." At their peak, the stable had 120 horses.

Her last winner was Spitting Image at Redcar on 8 August 2004, after which her son Keith took over the yard, now numbering 60 horses, although she continued to be involved in point-to-point racing.

Her best season over jumps was 1999-2000 when she had 105 winners, though her highest position in the jump trainers' championship was fourth in 1996-97. On the flat, her highest position was 18th in 1993, and her highest win total was 84 in 1994. In total she had 1,330 winners over jumps and 680 on the flat.

She died on 30 October 2017 at the age of 77. She collapsed while out in the yard with her horses. Son Keith said, "She has passed away doing something she absolutely loved."

== Personality ==
According to racing journalist Cornelius Lysaght she seemed "a quiet, homely character, like your friend's lovely mother, but outward appearances clearly belied a steely inward resolve". Her stables were the "shrewdest of forces", especially in the north. On her retirement, The Guardian referred to her career as "one of the most remarkable of recent years", calling her a "canny granny".

Her favourite racecourses were all near her home - Redcar, Wetherby, Sedgefield, Newcastle and Kelso.

She was a fan of soap operas.

== Family ==
Mary married George Reveley in 1960, and had two sons - Keith, who was her assistant and took over the training licence in 2004, and John. Keith is father to James, a jockey, who shortly before her death made her a great-grandmother when he had his first child. James was crowned the champion national hunt jockey of France in 2016.
