= Big Buck's =

French-bred Thoroughbred racehorse (2003–2026)

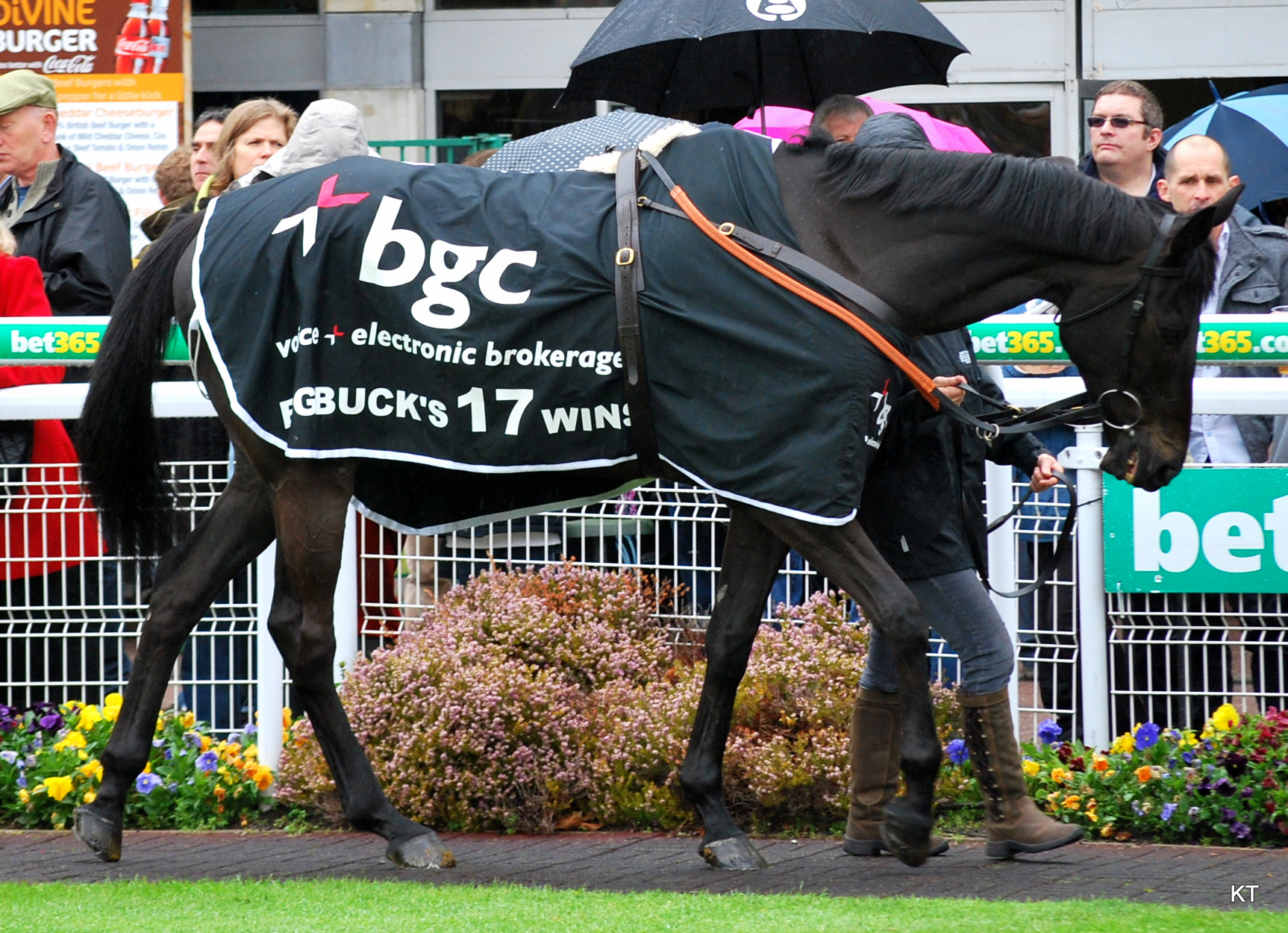
- Big Buck's in 2012
- Sire: Cadoudal
- Dam: Buck's
- Damsire: Le Glorieux
- Sex: Gelding
- Foaled: 16 April 2003
- Died: August 2026 (aged 23)
- Country: France
- Colour: Bay or Brown
- Breeder: Henri Poulat
- Owner: Henri Poulat (2006–2007); Stewart Family (2007–2014)
- Trainer: R-E Lecomte (2006–2007); Paul Nicholls (2007–2014)
- Record: 40: 23–2-4
- Earnings: £1,275,333

Major wins
- Prix Amadou (2007); Mildmay Novices' Chase (2008); Cleeve Hurdle (2009, 2012); World Hurdle (2009, 2010, 2011, 2012); Liverpool Hurdle (2009, 2010, 2011, 2012); Long Distance Hurdle (2009, 2010, 2011, 2012); Long Walk Hurdle (2009, 2010, 2011)

Big Buck's (16 April 2003 – August 2026) was a French-bred National Hunt racehorse trained in Britain by Paul Nicholls. He was owned by businessman Andy Stewart and specialised in racing over hurdles. At the 2012 Cheltenham Festival, Big Buck's made history by winning his fourth consecutive World Hurdles, he is widely regarded as the greatest staying hurdler of all time. He was retired on 13 March 2014.

== Racing career ==
=== 2006–2007 season ===
Big Buck's raced thirteen times in France, recording two wins including the Grade II Prix Amadou at Auteuil Hippodrome.

=== 2007–2008 season ===
Big Buck's won the Mar-key Group Beginners' Chase beating the Queen's horse Barbers Shop. He then ran in the Bathwick Tyres Andover Novices' Chase and was just beaten by Moon Over Miami.

He started the year with a win in the Mc Seafoods Novices' Chase ridden by Ruby Walsh, winning by 2 lengths. He then finished 3rd in the Kingmaker Novices' Chase and went to the Cheltenham Festival for the Jewson Novices' Handicap Chase, where he finished 7th behind Finger On The Pulse. After the Festival he went to Aintree to win the Mildmay Novices' Chase by 2 1/4 lengths, beating Battlecry.

=== 2008–2009 season ===
While Ruby Walsh was injured, Sam Thomas rode Big Buck's in the Hennessy Gold Cup, where the horse blundered and unseated his jockey.

Big Buck's returned to hurdles in 2009 at Cheltenham where he finished first, beating Don't Push It. He went on to win the Cleeve Hurdle, beating the odds-on favourite Punchestowns by four lengths. This was his prep race for the World Hurdle on 12 March 2009. Kasbah Bliss was the odds on favourite to win, and Punchestowns was the 100-30 second favourite. Big Buck's and Punchestowns jumped the last hurdle together, but Big Bucks made a mistake. However, he won by 1 3/4 lengths, with Powerstation third and Kasbah Bliss a well-beaten fourth. Big Buck's went to Aintree for the Liverpool Hurdle and beat Mighty Man by 3 1/4 lengths, who won this race in 2006 & 2007.

=== 2009–2010 season ===
In the 2009–2010 season, Big Buck's was unbeaten in four races. In autumn, he won the Long Distance Hurdle and the Long Walk Hurdle, both at Newbury Racecourse. In spring, he won a second World Hurdle and again followed up in the Liverpool Hurdle.

=== 2010–2011 season ===
In the 2010–2011 season, Big Buck's was again aimed at the Ladbrokes World Hurdle. In every race prior to the World Hurdle, he won, not even coming off the bridle once. When it came to the big event itself, it was billed a straight head to head between Big Buck's and the fast-progressing Grands Crus. The slow pace set by Cross Kennon never suited Big Buck's, but they both travelled well throughout the race. Ruby Walsh kicked Big Buck's into the lead two out with Grand Crus stalking and moving well. However, Big Buck's accelerated away to win a third consecutive World Hurdle by 1 1/2 lengths.

=== 2011–2012 season ===
Big Buck's started the 2011/12 season by winning the Long Distance Hurdle at Newbury by 5 lengths without ever coming off the bridle. In December, he ran at Ascot in the Long Walk hurdle and despite looking like he was in trouble at one stage when chasing the front-running Dynaste, he was quickly picked up by Ruby Walsh and swept past him for an 8-length win. Next up, Big Buck's ran at Cheltenham in January 2012 in the Cleeve Hurdle when his trainer Paul Nicholls and owner Andy Stewart decided it would be good to give the champion staying hurdler one final run before trying for an unprecedented 4th win in the Ladbrokes World Hurdle at the Cheltenham Festival. Big Buck's swept past Dynaste under Ruby Walsh's urgings for a 7 lengths success. This set up Big Buck's for a clash with Nicky Henderson's star hurdler Oscar Whisky and the popular Irish grey Thousand Stars at the Cheltenham Festival. Although his main market rivals didn't fire, C A Murphy's mare Voler La Vedette seemed to have him in trouble jumping the last. Despite this, Big Buck's won and became the first horse to win four successive staying hurdle titles at Cheltenham.

=== 2012–2013 season ===
Big Buck's came back from a 233-day lay-off to record a facile victory in the 2012 Long Distance Hurdle at Newbury, recording his fourth straight win in the race. He conceded 8 pounds to the runner up, Reve De Sivola, and won by 9 lengths in a canter. Shortly after Big Buck's' 18th consecutive victory, he was found to have sustained a serious injury that forced him to miss the rest of the season. Reve De Sivola won both that season's grade 1 Long Walk Hurdle and grade 2 Cleeve Hurdle before being defeated by 5 3/4 lengths into fourth in the same season's World Hurdle.

=== 2013–2014 season ===
After a break of more than a year, Big Buck's returned in the Cleeve Hurdle at Cheltenham on 25 January. Ridden by Sam Twiston-Davies, he sustained his first defeat in more than five years as he finished third behind 66/1 outsider Knockara Beau and At Fishers Cross.

Big Buck's was retired on 13 March 2014 after finishing fifth behind More Of That, Annie Power, At Fishers Cross, and Zarkandar in the World Hurdle at Cheltenham Racecourse.

== Death ==
Big Buck's died in August 2026, at the age of 23.

== See also ==
- Repeat winners of horse races
