= Tom Scudamore =

British jockey (born 1982)

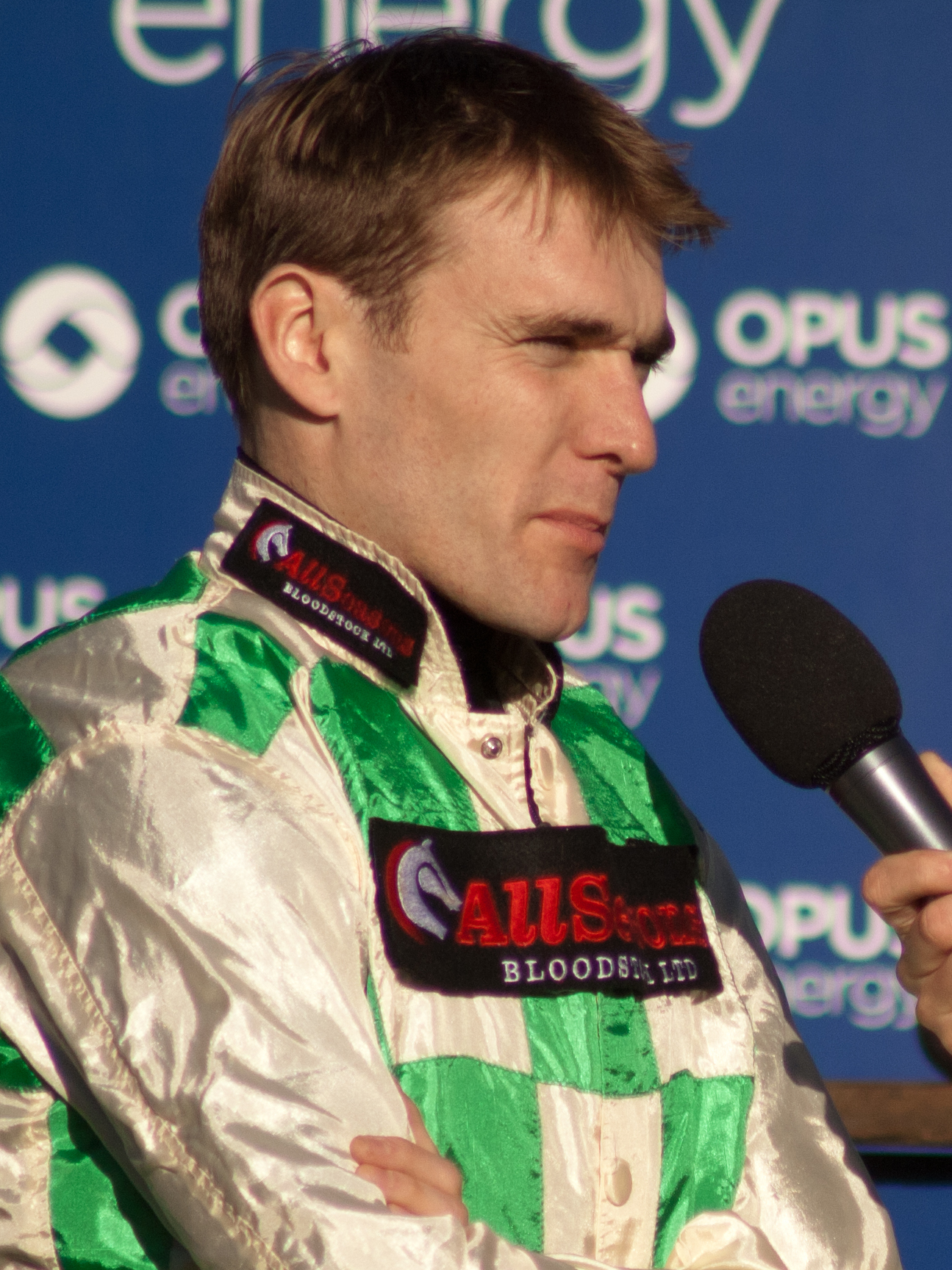
Scudamore in 2014

Tom Scudamore (born 22 May 1982) is a retired third-generation British flat and steeplechase jockey. He is the son of eight-time champion jockey Peter Scudamore; his grandfather Michael won the Grand National on Oxo in 1959.

== Background ==
Scudamore grew up in the village of Naunton, Gloucestershire. He began riding horses at the age of two.

He was educated at Cheltenham College Junior School and Cheltenham College. Although he began riding as a jockey whilst still at Cheltenham College, Scudamore obtained two A-levels.

== Career ==
At 5'8" tall and 9 stone 12 lbs. (138 lbs.), Scudamore's first flat win was on Nordic Breeze at Warwick in July 1998. His first steeplechase win was aboard Young Thruster at Newton Abbot Racecourse in November of the same year. He was British amateur champion jockey in 2001 (riding his first Grand National that year as an amateur, on Northern Starlight). Scudamore turned professional in October 2001, winning his first professional race at Chepstow Racecourse on Belle d'Anjou that month. Notable wins are the Ladbroke Hurdle on Desert Air, the Red Square Gold Cup aboard Heltornic, the Eider Chase on Nil Desperandum and the VC Casino Gold Cup aboard Madison Du Berlais. In 2013–2014, he amassed 100 wins. In 2014-15 he rode 150 winners. Riding first for trainer Martin Pipe, from March 2007 Scudamore was stable jockey for Martin's son David Pipe in Nicholashayne, Devon. He rode 1,499 winners over jumps in Britain and Ireland, and at the time of his retirement was tenth on the all-time jump jockeys winners' list.

== Retirement ==
Scudamore announced his retirement with immediate effect on 17 February 2023 after being unseated at Leicester from Ya Know Yaseff, who is trained by Scudamore's long-term ally David Pipe. The incident came shortly after suffering from a concussion in fall two weeks earlier at Chepstow.

== Family ==
He became engaged to Charlotte Stucley, daughter of Sir Hugh and Lady Stucley, and the couple married in 2005. They had their first daughter in September 2006 and their second in May 2008.

Charlotte and Tom separated in May, 2016

== Cheltenham Festival winners (10) ==
- Stayers' Hurdle - (1) Thistlecrack (2016)
- Arkle Challenge Trophy - (1) Western Warhorse (2014)
- Champion Bumper - (1) Moon Racer (2015)
- Ryanair Chase - (1) Dynaste (2014)
- Festival Trophy Handicap Chase - (3) An Accordion (2008), Un Temps Pour Tout (2016,2017)
- Johnny Henderson Grand Annual Chase - (1) Next Sensation (2015)
- Brown Advisory & Merriebelle Stable Plate Handicap Chase - (2) Salut Flo (2012), Ballynagour (2014)

== Major wins ==
(United Kingdom) Great Britain

- King George VI Chase - (1) Thistlecrack (2016)
- Long Walk Hurdle - (2) Lough Derg (2007), Thistlecrack (2015)
- Kauto Star Novices' Chase - (2) Grands Crus (2011), Dynaste (2012)
- Finale Juvenile Hurdle - (1) Adagio (2020)
- Clarence House Chase - (1) Tamarinbleu (2008)
- Betway Bowl - (1) Madison du Berlais (2009)
- Mildmay Novices' Chase - (1) Dynaste (2013)
- Liverpool Hurdle - (2) Maid Equal (2001), Thistlecrack (2016)
- Celebration Chase - (1) I'm So Lucky (2010)
