= Daryl Jacob =

Irish National Hunt jockey (born 1983)

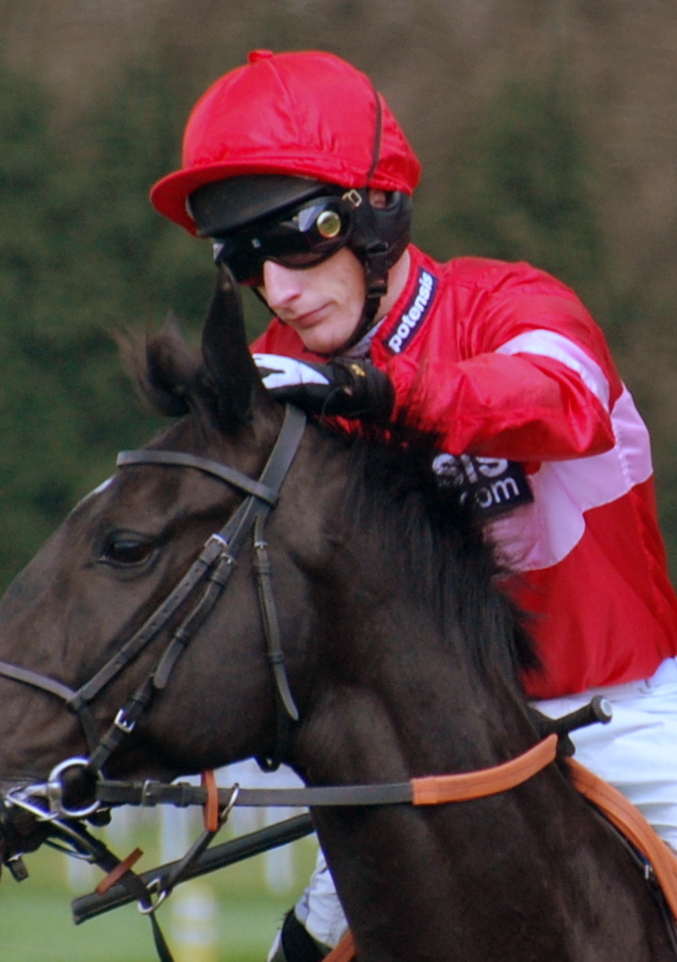
- Jacob riding Sanctuaire at the Celebration Chase at Sandown in 2013

Personal information
- Born: 25 August 1983 (age 42) Enniscorthy, County Wexford, Ireland
- Occupation: Jockey

Horse racing career
- Sport: Horse racing

Daryl Jacob (born 25 August 1983) is a retired Irish National Hunt jockey, who rode 31 Grade 1 winners and won the 2012 Grand National on Neptune Collonges. Based in Britain from 2003, he was attached to the yard of Paul Nicholls from 2011 to 2014, initially as second jockey to Ruby Walsh and then as first jockey. From 2014 to his retirement in 2024, he was retained by owners Simon Munir and Isaac Souede.

== Background ==
Jacob grew up in Davidstown, near Enniscorthy, in County Wexford, Ireland, where his father was a landscaper. One of five children, he attended St Mary's Primary School in Enniscorthy and Kilkenny College, where he excelled at rugby and Gaelic games. He learnt to ride on ponies owned by a neighbour and left school to work at the yard of Dessie Hughes.

== Career as a jockey ==
In 2003, Jacob moved to England and joined the yard of trainers Robert and Sally Alner in Dorset. His first winner under rules was Orbicularis in an amateur riders’ hurdle at Exeter for trainer Alison Thorpe in December 2003. His first Grade 1 win came on The Listener, a grey horse trained by Alner, in the Lexus Chase at Leopardstown in 2006, when he was still a conditional jockey. The pair went on to win the John Durkan Memorial Punchestown Chase in 2007 and the Irish Gold Cup in 2008.

Jacob secured his first win at the Cheltenham Festival in 2011 when Zarkandar, trained by Paul Nicholls, won the Triumph Hurdle. Two months later he was appointed as Nicholls’ number two jockey behind Ruby Walsh. In 2012 Jacob provided Nicholls with his first win in the Grand National when 33-1 outsider Neptune Collonges beat Sunnyhillboy by a nose, becoming the first grey horse to win the Grand National since Nicolaus Silver in 1961. When Walsh left Nicholls’ yard in 2013, Jacob took over as main jockey but the position lasted less than a year and he was displaced by Sam Twiston-Davies in April 2014. He elected to ride freelance rather than return to being number two jockey for Nicholls.

Soon after leaving Nicholls, Jacob became the retained jockey for owners Simon Munir and Isaac Souede. He stayed in the role until his retirement in 2024. Munir and Suede's grey horse Bristol De Mai, trained by Nigel Twiston-Davies, gave Jacob three victories in the Betfair Chase (2017, 2018, 2020) as well as a third place in the 2019 Cheltenham Gold Cup. Jacob's best season was in 2016/17, when he rode 91 winners. He rode his 1,000th winner at Ayr on 2 November 2024, having spent months on the sidelines with a collarbone injury.

Jacob retired from race-riding on 29 December 2024. Although his final ride on Mr Percy at Leopardstown was unsuccessful, he had won the Grade 1 Faugheen Novice Chase at Limerick the previous day on Impaire Et Passe, trained by Willie Mullins for owners Munir and Souede. He said: “Simon [Munir] and Isaac [Souede] came along at the perfect time in my career and they gave me a lot more longevity than I thought I was going to have. I've had an amazing career and so much fun along the way. The time is right now and I'm looking forward to a new chapter”.

Over his career, Jacob achieved 1002 wins (963 in Britain, 30 in Ireland and 9 in France), including 31 Grade 1 wins.

== Personal life ==
Jacob is married and has two children.

== Cheltenham Festival winners (3) ==
- Triumph Hurdle - (1) Zarkandar (2011)
- County Handicap Hurdle - (1) Lac Fontana (2014)
- Dawn Run Mares' Novices' Hurdle - (1) Concertista (2020)

== Major wins ==
(Republic of Ireland) Ireland

- Irish Gold Cup - (1) The Listener (2008)
- Arkle Novice Chase - (1) El Fabiolo (2023)
- Ryanair Novice Chase - (1) Footpad (2018)
- Champion Four Year Old Hurdle - (1) Fusil Raffles (2019)
- JNwine.com Champion Chase - (1) Kauto Stone (2012)
- Savills Chase - (1) The Listener (2006)
- Paddy's Reward Club Chase - (1) Blue Lord (2022)
- Slaney Novice Hurdle - (1) Readin Tommy Wrong (2024)
- Faugheen Novice Chase - (1) Impaire Et Passe (2024)

(United Kingdom) Great Britain

- Betfair Chase - (3) Bristol De Mai (2017, 2018, 2020)
- Aintree Hurdle - (1) L'Ami Serge (2018)
- Top Novices' Hurdle - (1) Topolski (2011)
- Henry VIII Novices' Chase - (2) Hinterland (2013), Sceau Royal (2017)
- Long Walk Hurdle - (1) Reve De Sivola (2014)
- Finale Juvenile Hurdle - (3) Me Voici (2009), Bristol De Mai (2014), We Have A Dream (2017)
- Challow Novices' Hurdle - (2) Reve De Sivola (2010), Messire Des Obeaux (2017)
- Scilly Isles Novices' Chase - (4) Gitane Du Berlais (2015), Bristol De Mai (2016), Top Notch (2017), Terrefort (2018)
- Anniversary 4-Y-O Novices' Hurdle - (1) We Have A Dream (2018)
- Mildmay Novices' Chase - (1) Terrefort (2018)
- Celebration Chase - (1) Sanctuaire (2012)

France

- Grande Course de Haies d'Auteuil - (1) L'Ami Serge (2017)
