= 1999 Champion Hurdle =

70th Champion Hurdle
- Champion Hurdle
- Location: Cheltenham Racecourse
- Date: 16 March 1999
- Winning horse: Istabraq (IRE)
- Jockey: Charlie Swan
- Trainer: Aidan O'Brien (IRE)
- Owner: J. P. McManus

The 1999 Champion Hurdle was a horse race held at Cheltenham Racecourse on Tuesday 16 March 1999. It was the 70th running of the Champion Hurdle.

The winner for the second consecutive year was J. P. McManus's Istabraq, a seven-year-old gelding trained in Ireland by Aidan O'Brien and ridden by Charlie Swan.

Istabraq started the 4/9 favourite and won by three and a half lengths from his stable companion Theatreworld, who had also finished runner-up in the previous two years, with the leading British hurdler French Holly in third place. Twelve of the fourteen runners completed the course.

== Race details ==
- Sponsor: Smurfit
- Purse: £232,800; First prize: £138,000
- Going: Good to Soft
- Distance: 2 miles 110 yards
- Number of runners: 14
- Winner's time: 3m 56.80

== Full result ==
Pos.	Marg.	Horse (bred)	Age	Jockey	Trainer (Country)	Odds
1		Istabraq (IRE)	7	Charlie Swan	Aidan O'Brien (IRE)	4/9 fav
2	3½	Theatreworld (IRE)	7	Tommy Treacy	Aidan O'Brien (IRE)	16/1
3	2½	French Holly (USA)	8	Andrew Thornton	Ferdy Murphy (GB)	11/2
4	1	Mister Morose (IRE)	9	Carl Llewellyn	Nigel Twiston-Davies (GB)	100/1
5	1¼	Nomadic (GB)	5	Paul Carberry	Noel Meade (IRE)	50/1
6	2	Tiutchev (GB)	6	Mick Fitzgerald	David Nicholson (GB)	40/1
7	½	Bellator (FR)	6	Norman Williamson	Venetia Williams (GB)	50/1
8	13	City Hall (IRE)	5	Robert Thornton	Val Ward (GB)	33/1
9	3	Lady Cricket (FR)	5	A. P. McCoy	Martin Pipe (GB)	16/1
10	4	Midnight Legend (GB)	8	Tony Dobbin	David Nicholson (GB)	50/1
11	14	Grey Shot (GB)	7	Jamie Osborne	Ian Balding (GB)	33/1
12	17	Upgrade (GB)	5	Chris Maude	Nigel Twiston-Davies (GB)	66/1
Fell		Zafarabad (IRE)	5	Richard Johnson	David Nicholson (GB)	40/1
BD		Blowing Wind (FR)	6	Richard Dunwoody	Martin Pipe (GB)	33/1

- Abbreviations: nse = nose; nk = neck; hd = head; dist = distance; UR = unseated rider; PU = pulled up; LFT = left at start; SU = slipped up; BD = brought down

== Winner's details ==
Further details of the winner, Istabraq

- Sex: Gelding
- Foaled: 23 May 1992
- Country: Ireland
- Sire: Sadler's Wells; Dam: Betty's Secret (Secretariat)
- Owner: J. P. McManus
- Breeder: Shadwell Stud
