= Anzum =

British-bred Thoroughbred racehorse

- Sire: Ardross
- Grandsire: Run The Gantlet
- Dam: Muznah
- Damsire: Royal and Regal
- Sex: Gelding
- Foaled: 6 April 1991
- Country: United Kingdom
- Colour: Bay
- Breeder: Cobhall Court Stud
- Owner: The Old Foresters Partnership
- Trainer: David Nicholson; Alan King; Richard Phillips
- Record: 32: 10-6-8
- Earnings: £206,726

Major wins
- Summit Junior Hurdle (1994); Stayers' Hurdle (1999); Champion Stayers Hurdle (1999); Long Walk Hurdle (1999)

Anzum (foaled 6 April 1991) was a British Thoroughbred racehorse best known for his performances in National Hunt racing. After failing to win in eight races on the flat he made an immediate impact when switched to hurdle races, winning his first six races over obstacles including the Summit Junior Hurdle and taking third place in the Triumph Hurdle. After winning only once in the next three years he established himself as a leading staying hurdler in 1999 with wins in the Stayers' Hurdle, Champion Stayers Hurdle and Long Walk Hurdle. He ran his last race in April 2001 and was retired with a record of ten wins and fourteen places from thirty-two starts.

== Background ==
Anzum was a bay gelding with no white markings bred by the Herefordshire-based Cobhall Court Stud. He was sired by Ardross, an outstanding stayer who won thirteen Group races including two runnings of the Ascot Gold Cup and was British Horse of the Year in 1982. As a breeding stallion he made an impact as a sire of National Hunt horses including the Champion Hurdler Alderbrook, Young Kenny (Scottish Grand National), Avro Anson (Dipper Novices' Chase) and Burgoyne (West Yorkshire Hurdle): he is also the paternal grandsire of Coneygree. Anzum's dam Muznah was a fairly useful racehorse, winning two of her nine races and achieving a Timeform racing of 92 in 1983. She was a great-great-great granddaughter of the broodmare Lost Soul whose other descendants included Hethersett, Neasham Belle and Doyoun. Muznah had previously foaled the Top Novices' Hurdle winner Jazilah and went on to produce the Grade 2 winning hurdler Sh Boom.

As a foal, Anzum was sent to the November sale at Doncaster and was bought for 3,400 guineas by David Minton Bloodstock. A year later, he was offered for auction at Tattersalls and was sold for 9,800 guineas to Margaret O'Toole. During his racing career, the gelding was owned by The Old Foresters Partnership. He was initially sent into training with David Nicholson (best known as a trainer of steeplechasers) in Gloucestershire.

== Racing career ==
=== Flat racing career ===
Anzum made little impression in four races as a two-year-old in 1993, producing his best effort on his final appearance when he finished third in a ten furlong maiden race at Nottingham Racecourse in October. He failed to win in four attempts as a three-year-old, but showed some signs of ability in maidens and minor handicap races, never finishing worse than third. His best effort probably came when he finished second to the future Chester Cup winner Silence In Court over fourteen furlongs at Nottingham in May.

=== 1994/1995 National Hunt season: novice hurdle races ===
Anzum made his debut over obstacles in a novice hurdle at Bangor-on-Dee Racecourse on 28 October in which he was ridden by Warren Marston and won by nine lengths from Symbol of Success. Marston was again in the saddle when the gelding won a similar event at Newbury Racecourse on 9 November, beating Khatir by nine lengths at odds of 13/8. Two weeks later, ridden by Adrian Maguire he started odds-on favourite at Nottingham and completed his hat-trick, beating Tulu by one and a half lengths. On 10 December, Anzum was moved up in class for the Grade 2 Summit Junior Hurdle at Lingfield Park Racecourse in which he was ridden by Robert Massey. Starting the 10/11 favourite in a seven-runner field on heavy ground, he took the lead approaching the second last and held off the late challenge of the Toby Balding-trained Brave Tornado to win by three-quarters of a length.

Anzum took his winning run to five at Warwick Racecourse in January when Marston rode him to a six length win in the Red Rose Novices' Hurdle at odds of 4/9. The gelding's winning streak stretched to six in February when he led from the start in the Stroud Green Hurdle at Newbury and won by twenty lengths from the filly Karline Ka. On 16 March 1995, Anzum raced for the first time at the Cheltenham Festival where he was one of twenty-six four-year-olds to contest the Grade 1 Triumph Hurdle. Ridden by Marton he started the 9/1 third favourite behind Balanak (winner of the Dovecote Novices' Hurdle and Silver Wedge (Queen's Vase, Tolworth Hurdle). After losing ground at the fourth hurdle he made steady progress in the closing stages without ever looking likely to win and finished fourth behind Kissair, Silver Wedge and the subsequently disqualified Dr Leunt. On his final appearance of the season he was sent to Ireland and finished sixth behind Shaihar in the Champion Four Year Old Hurdle at Punchestown.

=== 1995/1996 National Hunt season ===
Anzum appeared only twice in the 1995/1996 National Hunt season. He finished seventh behind Jibber The Kibber in the Silver Trophy Handicap Hurdle at Chepstow Racecourse in November and third in a handicap hurdle at Sandown in December.

=== 1996/1997 National Hunt season ===
After a break of almost a year, Anzum returned in a handicap hurdle over two and three quarter miles at Haydock Park on 26 November 1996. Carrying 160 pounds he was prominent from the start and stayed on well in the closing stages to take the lead in the final strides and won by a head from Burnt Imp with Dally Boy a head away in third. In February he carried top weight of 164 pounds in a two and half mile handicap at Chepstow and finished third behind Brave Tornado and Moorish. Two years after his defeat in the Triumph Hurdle, Anzum returned to the Cheltenham Festival to contest the Stayers' Hurdle over three miles. Starting a 25/1 outsider he was ridden by Richard Johnson in a field which included Escartefigue, What A Question (Long Distance Hurdle), Urubande (Aintree Hurdle), Trainglot (Cesarewitch Handicap), Ocean Hawk (Long Walk Hurdle), Pridwell and Derrymoyle (Tipperkevin Hurdle). Anzum was not among the early leaders and made several jumping errors but stayed on strongly on the run-in to finish second, two and half lengths behind Karshi and two lengths ahead of Paddy's Return.

=== 1998/1999 National Hunt season ===
Anzum missed the whole of the 1997/1998 season before returning in the Grade 1 Long Walk Hurdle at Ascot in December 1998 in which he started a 40/1 outsider and came home seventh of the eight finishers behind Princeful. In January he started at odds of 40/1 in a seven runner field for the Cleeve Hurdle at Cheltenham and finished fifth, more than fifty lengths behind the winner Lady Rebecca. Anzum began to show improvement in his next race, the Rendlesham Hurdle at Kempton Park Racecourse on February. Carrying a relatively light weight of 147 pounds he stayed on well in the closing stages to finish second, eight lengths behind his stablemate Pharanear, with the joint-favourites Pridwell and Ocean Hawk finishing fourth and sixth respectively.

On his third appearance at the Cheltenham Festival, Anzum was ridden by Richard Johnson when he started a 40/1 outsider for the 28th running of the Stayers' Hurdle. The 2/1 joint-favourites were Deano's Beeno (winner of the premier Long Distance Hurdle) and Le Coudray a leading French hurdler who had recently been transferred to the Irish stable of Aidan O'Brien. Lady Rebecca, Paddy's Return and Ocean Hawk were also in the field as well as Juyush (Ascot Hurdle), Turnpole (Cesarewitch) and Kerawi (Christmas Hurdle). Racing on good to soft ground, Anzum was not among the early leaders, came under pressure from the seventh hurdle and was only eighth at the third last at which point Deano's Beeno, who had led up to that point, began to weaken and was overtaken by the Irish mare Sallies Girl. On the final turn Lady Rebecca took the lead from Sallies Girl as Le Coudray made rapid progress on the outside and Anzum began to make progress. Lady Rebecca landed in front over the last but was overtaken by Le Coudray who looked certain to win before Anzum produced a very strong late run to take the lead in the final strides and win by a neck. Lady Rebecca finished third ahead of Sallies Girl and Juyush. Nicholson said: "I watched the race from the lawn and when they passed me I thought he might get second, but as I went towards the winner's enclosure Arthur Moore told me I'd won it."

In April, Anzum was sent to Ireland to contest the Champion Stayers Hurdle at Punchestown Racecourse and started 7/1 third favourite behind Le Coudray and the mare Marello, with the other runners being Mister Morose (November Novices' Chase), Pharanear and Khayrawani (Coral Cup). In contrast to the tactics previously employed, Johnson sent Anzum into the lead from the start and held off several challenges before staying on strongly on the run-in to win by two and a half lengths from Khayrawani.

=== 1999/2000 National Hunt season ===
Anzum began his next campaign in the Long Distance Hurdle at Newbury on 27 November in which he started at odds of 11/2 and finished third, beaten eighteen lengths and a neck by Deano's Beeno and the six-year-old gelding Just Nip. When David Nicholson retired in December, his assistant Alan King took over the stable. On 18 December, Anzum faced Deano's Beeno yet again in the Long Walk Hurdle at Ascot in a six-runner field which also included Pharanear, Ivor's Flutter, Boss Doyle (Mildmay Novices' Chase) and Count Campioni. Anzum tracked Deano's Beeno before taking the lead at the twelfth hurdle and drew well clear of his rival over the last two obstacles to win by seventeen lengths. Anzum started 5/4 favourite for a Grade 2 event at Haydock in January but after making the early running he was overtaken three hurdles out and finished third behind Behrajan and Merry Masquerade. He missed that year's Cheltenham Festival owing to the prevailing firm ground.

=== 2000/2001 National Hunt season ===
Anzum was off the racecourse for just over a year, during which time he was moved to the stable of Richard Phillips at Adlestrop, before returning for the Cloeve Hurdle at Cheltenham on 27 January 2001. Starting the 25/1 outsider against six opponents he finished third behind Lady Rebecca and Mister Banjo with Barton in fifth. On 31 March at Ascot he started 13/8 favourite for the Grade 2 Weatherbys Hurdle and finished second to the Martin Pipe-trained mare Maid Equal to whom he was conceding thirteen pounds. The 2001 Cheltenham Festival had been abandoned owing to the 2001 United Kingdom foot-and-mouth outbreak, but a series of substitute championship races were run at Sandown at the end of April. Anzum contested the Distance Championship, a substitute for the Stayers' Hurdle and started 8/1 third fourth choice in the betting behind Baracouda, Bacchanal and Behrajan. He was never in serious contention and finished last of the eleven runners behind Baracouda.

== Pedigree ==
Pedigree of Anzum (GB), bay gelding, 1991
Sire Ardross (IRE) 1976	Run the Gantlet (USA); 1968	Tom Rolfe	Ribot
Sire Ardross (IRE) 1976	Run the Gantlet (USA); 1968	Tom Rolfe	Pocahontas
Sire Ardross (IRE) 1976	Run the Gantlet (USA); 1968	First Feather	First Landing
Sire Ardross (IRE) 1976	Run the Gantlet (USA); 1968	First Feather	Quill
Sire Ardross (IRE) 1976	Le Melody (IRE); 1971	Levmoss	Le Levanstell
Sire Ardross (IRE) 1976	Le Melody (IRE); 1971	Levmoss	Feemoss
Sire Ardross (IRE) 1976	Le Melody (IRE); 1971	Arctic Melody	Arctic Slave
Sire Ardross (IRE) 1976	Le Melody (IRE); 1971	Arctic Melody	Bell Bird
Dam Muznah (IRE) 1980	Royal and Regal (USA); 1970	Vaguely Noble	Vienna
Dam Muznah (IRE) 1980	Royal and Regal (USA); 1970	Vaguely Noble	Noble Lassie
Dam Muznah (IRE) 1980	Royal and Regal (USA); 1970	Native Street	Native Dancer
Dam Muznah (IRE) 1980	Royal and Regal (USA); 1970	Native Street	Beaver Street
Dam Muznah (IRE) 1980	Ballinavail (GB); 1973	Rarity	Hethersett
Dam Muznah (IRE) 1980	Ballinavail (GB); 1973	Rarity	Who Can Tell
Dam Muznah (IRE) 1980	Ballinavail (GB); 1973	Whistling Rex	Whistling Wind
Dam Muznah (IRE) 1980	Ballinavail (GB); 1973	Whistling Rex	Gallop On (Family:21-a)
