= Wirral Juvenile Hurdle =

Hurdle horse race in Britain

Wirral Juvenile Hurdle
2025
Lord	Bibe Mus	Only One Blue

Previous years
2023
Liari	Knight Of Allen	Le Fauve
2021
Knight Salute	Porticello	Impulsive One

2020-2011
2020
Monmiral	Gold Desert	Glorious Zoff
2019
Navajo Pass	Lord Lamington	Paseo
2018
Quel Destin	Elysees	Oi The Clubb Oi's
2017
We Have A Dream	City Dreamer	Je Suis Charlie
2016
Cliffs of Dover	Lord Justice	Zig Zag
2015
Who Dares Wins	Robertstown	Sir Chauvelin
2014
Peace And Co	Starchitect	L'aigle Royal
2013
Fox Norton	Broughton	Royal Irish Hussar
2012
Kashmir Peak	Sametegal	Vasco Du Ronceray
2011
Royal Bonsai	Eagle Rock	Kie

2010-2001
2007
Lemon Silk	Art Professor	Five Dream
2004
Salut Saint Cloud	Patrixprial	Carte Diamond
2003
Mondul	Zimbabwe	Hope Sound

2000-1991
1999
Grand Seigneur	Romero	Mixsterthetrixster
1998
Hors La Loi	Wave Rock	Mothers Help
1997
Buddy Marvel	Amitge	Zafarelli
1996
Serenus	Circus Star	Sally's Twins
1994
Anzum	Brave Tornado	Moment Of Glory
1993
Admiral's Well	Nawar	Grand Applause
1992
Dare To Dream	Top Spin	Clurican
1991
None So Brave	Dante's View	Pims Gunner

1990-1987
1990
Oh So Risky	Silken Fan	Oxbow
1988
Take Issue	Santella Bobkes	Viking Venture
1987
South Parade	Goodwyns Lad	The Grifter

The Wirral Juvenile Hurdle is a Listed National Hunt hurdle race in Great Britain which is open to horses aged three years. It is run at Aintree over a distance of about 2 miles and 1 furlong (2 miles and 209 yards or 3,410 metres), and during its running there are nine hurdles to be jumped. The race is for novice hurdlers, and it is scheduled to take place each year in December.

Prior to 2023 it was named the Summit Juvenile Hurdle. It was originally run at Lingfield Park on the same day as the December Novices' Chase and the two races were later run on the same day at Doncaster. The race carried Grade 2 status until the 2021 running. It was downgraded to a Listed race by the British Horseracing Authority (BHA) in 2022.

In April 2023 the BHA announced that the race would be moved to Aintree and run one week earlier as part of a restructure of the 2023/24 programme. The race was given its present name in 2025.

== Records ==
Leading jockey (3 wins):

- Harry Cobden - Cliffs of Dover (2016), Quel Destin (2018), Liari (2023)

Leading trainer (4 wins):

- Paul Nicholls - Cliffs of Dover (2016), Quel Destin (2018), Monmiral (2020), Liari (2023)

== Winners ==
Year	Winner	Jockey	Trainer
1975	Sweet Joe	Ian Watkinson	Harry Thomson Jones
1976	Abandoned due to frost
1977	Abandoned due to waterlogged state of course
1978	Jack O'Lantern	Graham McCourt	Peter Cundell
1979	Mount Harvard	Steve Smith Eccles	Nicky Henderson
1980	Twelfth Night	Hywel Davies	Peter Cundell
1981	Abandoned due to snow
1982	Abandoned due to waterlogged state of course
1983	Paris North	John Francome	John Jenkins
1984	Beat The Retreat	Mark Perrett	John Jenkins
1985	That's Your Lot	Peter Scudamore	John Francome
1986	Mareth Line	Peter Scudamore	Martin Pipe
1987	South Parade	Graham Bradley	Toby Balding
1988	Take Issue	Dale McKeown	John Sutcliffe
	no race 1989
1990	Oh So Risky	Paul Holley	David Elsworth
1991	None So Brave	Jamie Osborne	Reg Akehurst
1992	Dare to Dream	David Bridgwater	Reg Akehurst
1993	Admiral's Well	Mick Fitzgerald	Reg Akehurst
1994	Anzum	Robert Massey	David Nicholson
1995	Abandoned due to snow
1996	Serenus	John Kavanagh	Nicky Henderson
1997	Buddy Marvel	Paul Carberry	Oliver Sherwood
1998	Hors La Loi III	Thierry Doumen	François Doumen
1999	Grand Seigneur	Thierry Doumen	François Doumen
2000	Abandoned due to waterlogged state of course
2001	Abandoned due to frost
2002	no race 2002
2003	Mondul	Ollie McPhail	Milton Harris
2004	Salut Saint Cloud	Brian Crowley	Gary L. Moore
	no race 2005–06 (Note: The 2005 and 2022 runnings were abandoned because of frost) (Note: The 2006, 2008 and 2009 editions were abandoned due to waterlogging.)
2007	Lemon Silk	Paul O'Neill	Kahlil Burke
	no race 2008–09-10 (Note: The 2010 running was abandoned due to snow)
2011	Royal Bonsai	Dougie Costello	John Quinn
2012	Kashmir Peak	Dougie Costello	John Quinn
2013	Fox Norton	Noel Fehily	Nick Williams
2014	Peace And Co	Daryl Jacob	Nicky Henderson
2015	Who Dares Wins	Wayne Hutchinson	Alan King
2016	Cliffs of Dover	Harry Cobden	Paul Nicholls
2017	We Have A Dream	Daryl Jacob	Nicky Henderson
2018	Quel Destin	Harry Cobden	Paul Nicholls
2019	Navajo Pass	Brian Hughes	Donald McCain
2020	Monmiral	Sean Bowen	Paul Nicholls
2021	Knight Salute	Paddy Brennan	Milton Harris
	no race 2022
2023	Liari	Harry Cobden	Paul Nicholls
	no race 2024 (Note: The 2024 running was abandoned due to strong winds)
2025

== See also ==
- Horse racing in Great Britain
- List of British National Hunt races
