= Karshi (horse) =

British-bred Thoroughbred racehorse

- Sire: Persian Bold
- Grandsire: Bold Lad (IRE)
- Dam: Kashmiri Snow
- Damsire: Shirley Heights
- Sex: Gelding
- Foaled: 7 April 1990
- Country: United Kingdom
- Colour: Bay
- Breeder: Lord Vestey
- Owner: Lord Vestey
- Trainer: James Fanshawe; Henrietta Knight
- Record: 24: 6-5-6
- Earnings: £98,675

Major wins
- Lonesome Glory Hurdle (1996); Stayers' Hurdle (1997)

Karshi (foaled 7 April 1990) was a British Thoroughbred racehorse best known for his performances in National Hunt racing. He was a moderate performer on the flat, winning one minor event in eleven attempts, but showed improved form when tried over hurdles despite recurring injury problems. In his first season over obstacles he won two novice races and finished third in the Sun Alliance Novices' Hurdle. In the following season he won the Lonesome Glory Hurdle and recorded his most important victory when winning the Stayers' Hurdle at odds of 20/1. He also produced several good performances under big weights in handicap races and won his only race over fences before leg injuries ended his racing career.

== Background ==
Karshi was a dark-coated bay gelding with no white markings bred in the United Kingdom by his owner Samuel Vestey, 3rd Baron Vestey. He was sired by Persian Bold whose wins included the Richmond Stakes and the Horris Hill Stakes in 1977. As a breeding stallion he was primarily known as a sire of flat race horses including Kooyonga, Bold Pilot, Pennine Walk (Queen Anne Stakes) and Persian Heights (St James's Palace Stakes). Kasrhi's dam Kashmiri Snow won one race and was a granddaughter of Lorenzaccio's half-sister Toast Record.

Karshi was a nervous, excitable horse who was described as being "a nightmare to train". Vestey initially sent the horse into training with James Fanshawe at Newmarket, Suffolk.

== Racing career ==
=== Flat racing career ===
Karshi ran five times as a three-year-old in 1993 without managing to win a race. After finishing third in the Wood Ditton Stakes over a mile at Newmarket Racecourse on his debut in April, he finished unplaced in his next two races before finishing second in minor events at Sandown and Leicester. In the following year he was placed in long distance handicap races at Salisbury and York before winning a race at the ninth attempt, when he took a maiden race at Catterick Racecourse by twelve lengths at odds of 2/9. On his last two appearances on the flat he was beaten in a two-runner race at Newmarket and finished fourth in the Cecil Frail Handicap at Haydock Park.

At the end of his flat racing career, Karshi was gelded and transferred to the stable of Henrietta Knight at West Lockinge in Oxfordshire.

=== 1995/1996 National Hunt season: novice hurdle races ===
Fourteen months after his last race, Karshi made his debut over obstacles in a Novice hurdle over two miles at Warwick Racecourse on 16 November 1995. Ridden by Jason Titley he led from the start and won by four lengths from Sir Leonard. He finished fifth in a hurdle at Leicester two weeks later before reappearing at Kempton Park Racecourse in January in which he was matched against River North, a top-class flat horse whose wins included the Aral-Pokal. Ridden by Jamie Osborne, Karshi was always among the leaders before overtaking River North on the run-in and won by one and a quarter lengths.

In March 1996, Karshi made his first appearance at the Cheltenham Festival where he started at odds of 14/1 for the Sun Alliance Novices' Hurdle. Ridden by Titley, he recovered from a jumping mistake at the last hurdle to finish third behind Urubande and Go-Informal, beaten less than two lengths by the winner. On his final appearance of the season he was pulled up in the Champion Novice Hurdle at Punchestown Racecourse in April.

=== 1996/1997 National Hunt season ===
On his first of the 1996/1997 National Hunt season, Karshi carried top weight in a handicap hurdle at Warwick in November and finished second to Balanak to whom he was conceding twenty-four pounds. In December he started 11/8 favourite for the Lonesome Glory Hurdle, a leg of the Sport of Kings Challenge series which was intended to promote competition between British and North American steeplechasers. Ridden by Osborne, he led for most of the way but overtaken by Mandy's Mantino on the run-in before rallying to regain the lead and win by four lengths. The American representative Serenity Prayer was fourteen lengths back in third place. Karshi's next race was a minor handicap hurdle over two miles five furlongs at Newbury Racecourse in February when he finished third to Copper Boy, conceding twenty-three pounds to the winner.

On 13 March at the Cheltenham Festival Karshi started at odds of 20/1 for the 26th running of the Stayers' Hurdle in a field which included Escartefigue, What A Question (Long Distance Hurdle), Urubande, Trainglot (Cesarewitch Handicap), Ocean Hawk (Long Walk Hurdle), Pridwell, Derrymoyle (Tipperkevin Hurdle) and Anzum. Ridden by Osborne, he was among the leaders from the start before losing his position three hurdles from the finish as Escartefigue and Paddy's Return opened up a clear advantage over the other runners. Karshi rallied to move up between Paddy's Return and Escartefigue approaching the final hurdle, took the lead and was driven clear on the run-in to win by two and a half lengths from the fast finishing Anzum.

=== 1997/1998 National Hunt season ===
After a nine-month absence, Karshi returned for a handicap hurdle at Doncaster Racecourse on 13 December in which he carried top weight of 168 pounds and finished third behind New Inn and Star Rage. Jim Culloty took over the ride on Karshi when he again carried 168 pounds and finished third to the Jenny Pitman-trained Princeful who was carrying twenty-eight pounds less. Princeful won the Stayers' Hurdle at two and a half months later. Karshi started 7/4 favourite for the Grade 1 Cleeve Hurdle at Cheltenham on 31 January but after leading for most of the way he tired in the closing stages and finished last of the five runners behind the mare Mistinguett. After the race, Karshi was found to have sustained a fracture to the pastern bone of his right foreleg and did not race again that season.

In October 1998, after a further nine-month absence, Karshi made his debut over fences in a novice chase at Exeter Racecourse. Starting the 11/4 second choice in the betting, he took the lead two fences out and won by eight lengths from Ocean Hawk. Karshi aggravated his old leg injury in the race and Knight explained "Over the past few years, he's had three separate hairline fractures of the leg. I'm afraid it's nothing that can be operated on. It's just a case of resting him and hoping to get him back for next season". Karshi never recovered and did not race again.

== Pedigree ==
Pedigree of Karshi (GB), bay gelding, 1990
Sire Persian Bold (IRE) 1975	Bold Lad (IRE); 1964	Bold Ruler	Nasrullah
Sire Persian Bold (IRE) 1975	Bold Lad (IRE); 1964	Bold Ruler	Miss Disco
Sire Persian Bold (IRE) 1975	Bold Lad (IRE); 1964	Barn Pride	Democratic
Sire Persian Bold (IRE) 1975	Bold Lad (IRE); 1964	Barn Pride	Fair Alycia
Sire Persian Bold (IRE) 1975	Relkarunner (GB); 1968	Relko	Tanerko
Sire Persian Bold (IRE) 1975	Relkarunner (GB); 1968	Relko	Relance
Sire Persian Bold (IRE) 1975	Relkarunner (GB); 1968	Running Blue	Blue Peter
Sire Persian Bold (IRE) 1975	Relkarunner (GB); 1968	Running Blue	Run Honey
Dam Kashmiri Snow (GB) 1982	Shirley Heights (GB); 1975	Mill Reef	Never Bend
Dam Kashmiri Snow (GB) 1982	Shirley Heights (GB); 1975	Mill Reef	Milan Mill
Dam Kashmiri Snow (GB) 1982	Shirley Heights (GB); 1975	Hardiemma	Hardicanute
Dam Kashmiri Snow (GB) 1982	Shirley Heights (GB); 1975	Hardiemma	Grand Cross
Dam Kashmiri Snow (GB) 1982	Two Can Sing (IRE); 1978	English Prince	Petingo
Dam Kashmiri Snow (GB) 1982	Two Can Sing (IRE); 1978	English Prince	English Miss
Dam Kashmiri Snow (GB) 1982	Two Can Sing (IRE); 1978	Toast Record	El Gallo
Dam Kashmiri Snow (GB) 1982	Two Can Sing (IRE); 1978	Toast Record	Phoenissa (Family: 5-h)
