= 2000 Champion Hurdle =

71st Champion Hurdle
- Champion Hurdle
- Location: Cheltenham Racecourse
- Date: 14 March 2000
- Winning horse: Istabraq (IRE)
- Jockey: Charlie Swan
- Trainer: Aidan O'Brien (IRE)
- Owner: J. P. McManus

The 2000 Champion Hurdle was a horse race held at Cheltenham Racecourse on Tuesday 14 March 2000. It was the 71st running of the Champion Hurdle.

The winner for the third consecutive year was J. P. McManus's Istabraq, an eight-year-old gelding trained in Ireland by Aidan O'Brien and ridden by Charlie Swan. Istabraq became the fifth horse to win three Champion Hurdles after Hatton's Grace, Sir Ken, Persian War and See You Then.

Istabraq started the 8/15 favourite and won by four lengths from the French challenger Hors La Loi III, with Blue Royal a neck away in third. Apart from Istabraq, the only previous winner of the race to run was Make A Stand who finished last. Eleven of the twelve runners completed the course.

== Race details ==
- Sponsor: Smurfit
- Purse: £250,000; First prize: £145,000
- Going: Good
- Distance: 2 miles 110 yards
- Number of runners: 12
- Winner's time: 3m 48.10

== Full result ==
Pos.	Marg.	Horse (bred)	Age	Jockey	Trainer (Country)	Odds
1		Istabraq (IRE)	8	Charlie Swan	Aidan O'Brien (IRE)	8/15 fav
2	4	Hors La Loi III (FR)	5	Dean Gallagher	François Doumen (FR)	11/1
3	nk	Blue Royal (FR)	5	Mick Fitzgerald	Nicky Henderson (GB)	16/1
4	½	Ashley Park (IRE)	6	Timmy Murphy	Mark Pitman (GB)	25/1
5	2	Stage Affair (USA)	6	Tony McCoy	Dermot Weld (IRE)	9/1
6	4	Dato Star (IRE)	9	Lorcan Wyer	Malcolm Jefferson (GB)	9/1
7	shd	Katarino (FR)	5	Norman Williamson	Nicky Henderson (GB)	25/1
8	1¾	Mr Percy (IRE)	9	Philip Hide	Josh Gifford (GB)	66/1
9	19	Theatreworld (IRE)	8	Tommy Treacy	Aidan O'Brien (IRE)	12/1
10	22	Alka International (GB)	8	Andrew Thornton	Prue Townsley (GB)	200/1
11	10	Make A Stand (GB)	9	Richard Johnson	Martin Pipe (GB)	33/1
PU		Balla Sola (IRE)	5	Conor O'Dwyer	Willie Mullins (IRE)	50/1

- Abbreviations: nse = nose; nk = neck; hd = head; dist = distance; UR = unseated rider; PU = pulled up; LFT = left at start; SU = slipped up

== Winner's details ==
Further details of the winner, Istabraq

- Sex: Gelding
- Foaled: 23 May 1992
- Country: Ireland
- Sire: Sadler's Wells; Dam: Betty's Secret (Secretariat)
- Owner: J. P. McManus
- Breeder: Shadwell Stud
