= 2002 Champion Hurdle =

72nd Champion Hurdle
- Champion Hurdle
- Location: Cheltenham Racecourse
- Date: 12 March 2002
- Winning horse: Hors La Loi III (FR)
- Jockey: Dean Gallagher
- Trainer: James Fanshawe (GB)
- Owner: Paul Green

The 2002 Champion Hurdle was a horse race held at Cheltenham Racecourse on Tuesday 12 March 2002. It was the 72nd running of the Champion Hurdle.

The race was won by Paul Green's Hors La Loi III, a seven-year-old French-bred gelding trained at Newmarket, Suffolk by James Fanshawe and ridden by Dean Gallagher. His victory was the first in the race for his owner and jockey. Fanshawe had previously won the race with Royal Gait in 1992.

Hors La Loi II started at odds of 10/1 and won by three lengths from the 25/1 outsider Marble Arch, with the French mare Bilboa in third. Istabraq who had won the race in 1998, 1999 and 2000 started the 2/1 favourite but was pulled up after jumping the first two hurdles. The second favourite Valiramix was fatally injured when he slipped and fell approaching the second last. Twelve of the fifteen runners completed the course.

== Race details ==
- Sponsor: Smurfit
- Purse: £270,000; First prize: £156,600
- Going: Good to Soft
- Distance: 2 miles 110 yards
- Number of runners: 15
- Winner's time: 3m 53.80

== Full result ==
Pos.	Marg.	Horse (bred)	Age	Jockey	Trainer (Country)	Odds
1		Hors La Loi III (FR)	7	Dean Gallagher	James Fanshawe (GB)	10/1
2	3	Marble Arch (GB)	6	Ruby Walsh	Hughie Morrison (GB)	25/1
3	½	Bilboa (FR)	5	Thierry Doumen	François Doumen (FR)	14/1
4	shd	Geos (FR)	7	Richard Johnson	Nicky Henderson (GB)	16/1
5	½	Landing Light (IRE)	7	Mick Fitzgerald	Nicky Henderson (GB)	100/30
6	8	Ansar (IRE)	6	Paul Carberry	Dermot Weld (IRE)	50/1
7	19	Mr Cool (GB)	8	Rodi Greene	Martin Pipe (GB)	100/1
8	1¾	Mister Morose (IRE)	12	Carl Llewellyn	Nigel Twiston-Davies (GB)	100/1
9	2	Liss A Paoraigh (IRE)	7	Norman Williamson	John Kiely (IRE)	20/1
10	3½	Chimes At Midnight (USA)	5	Martin Mooney	Luke Comer (IRE)	150/1
11	2	Rostropovich (IRE)	5	David Casey	Mouse Morris (IRE)	100/1
12	½	Regal Exit (FR)	6	J. R. Kavanagh	Nicky Henderson (GB)	66/1
PU		Istabraq (IRE)	10	Charlie Swan	Aidan O'Brien (IRE)	2/1 fav
SU		Valiramix (FR)	6	Tony McCoy	Martin Pipe (GB)	3/1
PU		Penny Rich (IRE)	8	Conor O'Dwyer	Tom Hogan (IRE)	100/1

- Abbreviations: nse = nose; nk = neck; hd = head; dist = distance; UR = unseated rider; PU = pulled up; LFT = left at start; SU = slipped up

== Winner's details ==
Further details of the winner, Hors La Loi III

- Sex: Gelding
- Foaled: 22 February 1995
- Country: France
- Sire: Cyborg; Dam: Quintessence III (El Condor)
- Owner: Paul Green
- Breeder: François Cottin
