= French Holly =

American-bred Thoroughbred racehorse

- Sire: Sir Ivor
- Grandsire: Sir Gaylord
- Dam: San Dot
- Damsire: Busted
- Sex: Gelding
- Foaled: 26 March 1991
- Country: United States
- Colour: Bay
- Breeder: Mario Sakurai
- Owner: Kieren Flood
- Trainer: Ferdy Murphy
- Record: 20:10-4-2
- Earnings: £236,704

Major wins
- Tolworth Hurdle (1998); Sidney Banks Memorial Novices' Hurdle (1998); Royal & SunAlliance Novices' Hurdle (1998); Christmas Hurdle (1998); Prix La Barka (1999)

French Holly (26 March 1991 – 5 November 1999) was an American-bred, British-trained Thoroughbred racehorse who competed in National Hunt racing. During a racing career which lasted from February 1996 until October 1999 he won ten of his twenty races and was placed on six occasions. He won two of his six flat races before switching to hurdling in the autumn of 1997. He was unbeaten as a novice winning five races including the Tolworth Hurdle and Royal & SunAlliance Novices' Hurdle. In the following year he won the Christmas Hurdle but then sustained three consecutive defeats when matched against the reigning Champion Hurdler Istabraq. He was then sent to France where he defeated a strong field in the Prix La Barka before finishing fourth in the French Champion Hurdle. He won his first and only steeplechase in October 1999 but was killed in a training accident seven days later.

== Background ==
French Holly was an unusually large, powerful, bay gelding standing 18 hands high with no white markings bred in Kentucky by Mario Sakurai. He was sired by Sir Ivor, and American-bred colt whose wins included The Derby in 1968 before becoming a successful breeding stallion whose other progeny included the Prix de l'Arc de Triomphe winner Ivanjica and the American Champion Older Male Horse Bates Motel. French Holly came from a very strong Flat racing family: his dam, Sans Dot was a daughter of The Oaks winner Juliette Marny and a close relative of the classic winners Julio Mariner (St Leger Stakes) and Scintillate. Sans Dot later produced Deano's Beeno who won thirteen races including the Grade I Long Walk Hurdle.

In November 1991, French Holly (already gelded) was sent as a foal to the Fasig-Tipton Kentucky fall mixed sale where he was sold for $2,000 to David Mullins. He was later bought privately by Kieren Flood and was sent into training with Ferdy Murphy at Leyburn, North Yorkshire.

French Holly was not particularly adept at jumping obstacles, relying on his size and strength to compensate. In 1998 Ferdy Murphy said of him: "When he's out in front like that he doesn't bother shortening up at a hurdle, he just goes and kicks them out of the way and goes straight through. He's so big he gets away with it. A smaller horse might hurt himself".

== Racing career ==
=== Early career ===
French Holly began his racing career competing in National Hunt Flat races, also known as "bumpers" making his debut at Uttoxeter Racecourse on 16 February 1996. Ridden by Paul Carberry he started the 5/4 favourite in a field of fifteen runners and won "comfortably" by four lengths after taking the lead in the final quarter mile. In the following month he was even more impressive at Newbury Racecourse, winning easily by thirteen lengths after taking the lead three furlongs from the finish. In April he was sent to Ireland and moved up in class as he contested the Grade I Jack White Memorial Flat Race at the Punchestown Festival. He started the 2/1 favourite, but was beaten three quarters of a length by the Paddy Mullins trained Noble Thyne.

After a break of more than ten months, French Holly returned for the Champion Bumper at the 1997 Cheltenham Festival. Ridden by Richard Hughes, he was among the leaders before weakening in the closing stages to finish sixth of the twenty-five runners, nine and a half lengths behind the Irish-trained winner Florida Pearl. In the following month he made a second unsuccessful attempt to win the Jack White Memorial Flat Race at Punchestown, finishing third behind Arctic Camper and Cloone Bridge. In June at Royal Ascot, French Holly made his only appearance in a conventional Flat race when he finished eleventh of the thirteen runners in the Queen Alexandra Stakes.

=== 1997/1998 National Hunt season ===
In the 1997/1998 National Hunt season French Holly competed in novice hurdle races, making his debut over obstacles at Ayr Racecourse on 16 November. Ridden for the first time by Andrew Thornton, who became his regular jockey, he took the lead at the second last hurdle and won by five lengths from Ledgendry Line. At Haydock Park in December he started 8/11 favourite against fifteen opponents and won by three and half lengths from Foundry Lane, having taken the lead three hurdles from the finish. On 10 January at Newbury, French Holly was moved up to Grade I class for the Tolworth Hurdle for which he started 4/1 second favourite behind Grey Shot, a top-class stayer on the flat who had won the Goodwood Cup in 1996 and the Jockey Club Cup in 1997. He was always among the leaders before overtaking Grey Shot at the second last hurdle. He survived a mistake at the obstacle before pulling clear to win by fourteen lengths. Following the gelding's victory Murphy said that he would consider bypassing the novice events at the Cheltenham Festival and going straight for the Champion Hurdle, but only if the ground was soft. At Huntingdon Racecourse in February French Holly started 8/13 favourite against three opponents and recovered from several jumping errors before accelerating after the last hurdle to win by two lengths from Better Offer.

On 18 March 1998, French Holly made his second appearance at the Cheltenham Festival when he was one of eighteen novices to contest the Grade I Royal & SunAlliance Novices' Hurdle over two miles and five furlongs. In the build-up to the race, Murphy had doubts about running the horse on the prevailing fast ground. Ridden by Thornton, he was made the 2/1 favourite ahead of Cloone Bridge, Erintante, Lady Rebecca and Torboy who were grouped together on 8/1. He raced just behind the leaders before taking the lead three hurdles from the finish. He went clear of the field approaching the next flight and won impressively by fourteen lengths from Torboy with Cloone Bridge two and a half lengths back in third place. After the race, Murphy said that the gelding would probably be aimed at the following year's Stayers' Hurdle before pursuing a career over fences.

=== 1998/1999 National Hunt season ===
On his first appearance of the 1998/1999 season, French Holly was matched against more experienced hurdlers in a handicap race at Ascot Racecourse and started 5/4 favourite despite carrying top weight of 168 pounds. He tracked the leaders, but weakened suddenly after the third last and was pulled up and dismounted by Thornton before the next flight. Despite his defeat, he was moved up in class four weeks later for the Fighting Fifth Hurdle (then a Grade II race) at Newcastle Racecourse and finished second, five lengths behind the favoured Dato Star. On 28 December 1998, at Kempton Park Racecourse French Holly faced Dato Star again in the Grade I Christmas Hurdle with the other runners including Kerawi, who had won the race in 1997. Starting the 5/2 second favourite, French Holly recovered from an early mistake to take the lead before half way and drew steadily clear of his rivals to win by nine lengths from Master Beveled, with Dato Star a further eight lengths back in third.

With Thornton suffering from a leg infection Adrian Maguire took over the ride on French Holly when the gelding was matched against the reigning Champion Hurdler Istabraq in the AIG Europe Champion Hurdle at Leopardstown Racecourse. Starting the 9/4 second favourite he took the lead from the start and maintained his advantage until he was overtaken by Istabraq approaching the last. He finished second, a length behind Itabraq and seven lengths clear of Zafarabad in third. In the Champion Hurdle at Cheltenham on 16 March, French Holly, partnered once again by Thornton, was the 11/2 second choice in the betting behind the 4/9 favourite Istabraq. He took the lead three hurdles from the finish but was soon overtaken by Istabraq and lost second place to Theatreworld in the closing stages. French Holly met Istabraq for the third time in the Aintree Hurdle over two and a half miles in April a race which also attracted his half-brother Deano's Beeno. Starting second favourite again, he took the lead three hurdles from the finish and landed in front over the last but was overtaken by Istabraq soon afterwards and finished second, a length behind the favourite.

In the early summer of 1999, French Holly was sent to compete in France where he was based with Murphy's daughter in Normandy and reportedly enjoyed excursions to the beach at Deauville. In the Prix La Barka 4300 metres on soft ground at Auteuil Hippodrome on 30 May, he was matched against some of the leading French hurdlers including Bog Frog and Earl Grant, the winners of the last two runnings of the Grande Course de Haies d'Auteuil (French Champion Hurdle). He took the lead at the final hurdle and won by three lengths from Kimbi, with a gap of eight lengths back to Mon Romain in third. A reportedly "ecstatic" Murphy said that "the whole purpose of bringing him here and running him over the bigger obstacles was to give him the experience he needs for a chasing campaign next season and we want to win the Millennium Gold Cup". French Holly returned to France three weeks later for the Grande Course de Haies d'Auteuil over 5100 metres. His cause was not helped when he collided with another runner at a practice hurdle and unseated Thornton before the race. Restrained by Thornton in the early stages of a slowly-run race he stayed on in the closing stages but finished fourth behind Vaporetto, Mon Romain and Asolo. Murphy felt that the firmer ground and slow pace had contributed to the horse's defeat.

=== 1999/2000 National Hunt season ===
In the autumn, French Holly began his career as a steeplechaser in a novice race over three miles and a furlong at Wetherby Racecourse. Only two horses appeared to oppose him and he started at odds of 2/11. He made some minor jumping errors but soon went well clear of his rivals and won by eighteen lengths from Monsieur Darcy despite being eased down by Thornton on the run-in. Murphy commented that the horse "wasn't a natural jumper in his early days over hurdles, but he has learnt all the time. We can go on from here".

On 5 November, French Holly was fatally injured in a training accident. Murphy explained "Andrew Thornton was here riding him and the horse came down and snapped his neck and was killed instantly. Everyone is devastated. The vet who has looked after him since he came here was here, and she is gutted. He will be very hard to replace".

== Pedigree ==
Pedigree of French Holly (USA), bay gelding, 1991
Sire Sir Ivor (USA) 1965	Sir Gaylord (USA); 1959	Turn-To	Royal Charger
Sire Sir Ivor (USA) 1965	Sir Gaylord (USA); 1959	Turn-To	Source Sucree
Sire Sir Ivor (USA) 1965	Sir Gaylord (USA); 1959	Somethingroyal	Princequillo
Sire Sir Ivor (USA) 1965	Sir Gaylord (USA); 1959	Somethingroyal	Imperatrice
Sire Sir Ivor (USA) 1965	Attica (USA); 1953	Mr. Trouble	Mahmoud
Sire Sir Ivor (USA) 1965	Attica (USA); 1953	Mr. Trouble	Motto
Sire Sir Ivor (USA) 1965	Attica (USA); 1953	Athenia	Pharamond
Sire Sir Ivor (USA) 1965	Attica (USA); 1953	Athenia	Salaminia
Dam San Dot (IRE) 1978	Busted (GB); 1963	Crepello	Donatello
Dam San Dot (IRE) 1978	Busted (GB); 1963	Crepello	Crepuscule
Dam San Dot (IRE) 1978	Busted (GB); 1963	Sans le Sou	Vimy
Dam San Dot (IRE) 1978	Busted (GB); 1963	Sans le Sou	Martial Loan
Dam San Dot (IRE) 1978	Juliette Marny (GB); 1972	Blakeney	Hethersett
Dam San Dot (IRE) 1978	Juliette Marny (GB); 1972	Blakeney	Windmill Girl
Dam San Dot (IRE) 1978	Juliette Marny (GB); 1972	Set Free	Worden
Dam San Dot (IRE) 1978	Juliette Marny (GB); 1972	Set Free	Emancipation (Family 6-b)
