= 1998 Champion Hurdle =

69th edition of Champion Hurdle horse race

69th Champion Hurdle
- Champion Hurdle
- Location: Cheltenham Racecourse
- Date: 17 March 1998
- Winning horse: Istabraq (IRE)
- Jockey: Charlie Swan
- Trainer: Aidan O'Brien (IRE)
- Owner: J. P. McManus

The 1998 Champion Hurdle was a horse race held at Cheltenham Racecourse on Tuesday 17 March 1998. It was the 69th running of the Champion Hurdle.

The winner was J. P. McManus's Istabraq, a six-year-old gelding trained in Ireland by Aidan O'Brien and ridden by Charlie Swan.

Istabraq started the 3/1 favourite and won by twelve lengths from his stable companion Theatreworld, who had finished second to Make A Stand in the previous year, with I'm Supposin in third place. There were no previous Champion Hurdlers in the field but the other runners included Pridwell, Relkeel and Dato Star. The strongly-fancied Shadow Leader was fatally injured in a fall at the final hurdle. Fifteen of the eighteen runners completed the course.

== Race details ==
- Sponsor: Smurfit
- Purse: £231,800; First prize: £137,420
- Going: Good
- Distance: 2 miles 110 yards
- Number of runners: 18
- Winner's time: 3m 49.10

== Full result ==
Pos.	Marg.	Horse (bred)	Age	Jockey	Trainer (Country)	Odds
1		Istabraq (IRE)	6	Charlie Swan	Aidan O'Brien (IRE)	3/1 fav
2	12	Theatreworld (IRE)	6	Tommy Treacy	Aidan O'Brien (IRE)	20/1
3	1	I'm Supposin (IRE)	6	Richard Dunwoody	Richard Rowe (GB)	6/1
4	1¼	Pridwell (GB)	8	A. P. McCoy	Martin Pipe (GB)	9/1
5	4	Kerawi (GB)	5	Carl Llewellyn	Nigel Twiston-Davies (GB)	25/1
6	1¼	Mistinguett (IRE)	6	Chris Maude	Nigel Twiston-Davies (GB)	40/1
7	nk	Shooting Light (IRE)	5	Rodney Farrant	Pat Murphy (GB)	66/1
8	3	Graphic Equaliser (IRE)	6	Paul Carberry	Arthur Moore (IRE)	33/1
9	2½	Relkeel (GB)	9	Adrian Maguire	David Nicholson (GB)	14/1
10	1¾	Cadougold (FR)	7	Mick Fitzgerald	Martin Pipe (GB)	25/1
11	3	Marello (GB)	7	Peter Niven	Mary Reveley (GB)	20/1
12	5	Sanmartino (IRE)	6	Richard Johnson	David Nicholson (GB)	20/1
13	nk	Dato Star (IRE)	7	Eddie Callaghan	Malcolm Jefferson (GB)	6/1
14	8	Grimes (GB)	5	Conor O'Dwyer	Christy Roche (IRE)	12/1
15	nk	Lady Daisy (IRE)	9	Jason Titley	Anthony Mullins (IRE)	100/1
UR		Bellator (GB)	5	Barry Fenton	Toby Balding (GB)	100/1
PU		Red Blazer (GB)	7	Jim Culloty	Henrietta Knight (GB)	33/1
Fell		Shadow Leader (GB)	7	Norman Williamson	Charles Egerton (GB)	13/2

- Abbreviations: nse = nose; nk = neck; hd = head; dist = distance; UR = unseated rider; PU = pulled up; LFT = left at start; SU = slipped up; BD = brought down

== Winner's details ==
Further details of the winner, Istabraq

- Sex: Gelding
- Foaled: 23 May 1992
- Country: Ireland
- Sire: Sadler's Wells; Dam: Betty's Secret (Secretariat)
- Owner: J. P. McManus
- Breeder: Shadwell Stud
