= December Novices' Chase =

Steeplechase horse race in Britain

December Novices' Chase
2021
Threeunderthrufive	Fantastikas	Emitom

Previous years
2020
Hurricane Harvey	Milanford	House Island
2019
Sam Spinner	Windsor Avenue	Only two finished
2018
Rocky's Treasure	Theclockisticking	Coup De Pinceau
2017
Keeper Hill	Braqueur D'or	Ballycrystal
2016
Present Man	Potters Legend	O O Seven
2015
Southfield Royale	Coologue	Weather Babe
2014
Virak	Wakanda	Killala Quay
2013
Black Thunder	Shotgun Paddy	Buachaill Alainn
2012
Court in Motion	Houblon Des Obeaux	Makethe Mostofnow
2009
Burton Port	Massasoit	Bench Warrant
2007
Verasi	Labelthou	Old Benny
2004
L'ami	Distant Thunder	Tribal Venture
2003
Lord Sam	Native Emperor	Rum Pointer

The December Novices' Chase was a Grade 2 National Hunt steeplechase in Great Britain which was open to horses aged four years or older. It was run at Doncaster over a distance of about 3 miles (2 miles 7 furlongs and 214 yards or 4,828 metres), and during its running there were eighteen fences to be jumped. The race was for novice chasers, and it was scheduled to take place each year in December.

The race was first run in 1988. Prior to 2014 it was run at Lingfield Park and was the only National Hunt event run at the course with graded status. It was transferred to Doncaster by Arena Racing Company, the owner of both courses. The Summit Juvenile Hurdle used to be contested on the same day at Lingfield but was transferred to Doncaster in 2010 – the two races were both run at the same meeting again until 2022.

In April 2023 the British Horseracing Authority announced the removal of the race from the 2023/24 programme.

== Winners ==
Year	Winner	Age	Jockey	Trainer
1988	Nick the Brief	6	Tom Costello	John Costello
	no race 1989
1990	Sparkling Flame	6	John White	Nicky Henderson
1991	River Bounty	5	Robbie Supple	John Upson
1992	Midnight Caller	6	Mark Richards	Simon Sherwood
1993	Martomick	6	Norman Williamson	Kim Bailey
1994	Abandoned due to unsafe state of chase course
1995	Abandoned due to snow
1996	Foodbroker Star	6	Leighton Aspell	Josh Gifford
1997	Fiddling the Facts	6	Norman Williamson	Nicky Henderson
1998	Executive King	7	Andrew Thornton	Geoff Hubbard
1999	Be My Mot	7	Jamie Goldstein	Gardie Grissell
2000	Abandoned due to waterlogged state of course
2001	Abandoned due to frost
	no race 2002
2003	Lord Sam	7	Andrew Thornton	Victor Dartnall
2004	L'Ami	5	Dean Gallagher	François Doumen
	no race 2005–06 (Note: The 2005, 2011 and 2022 runnings were abandoned because of frost) (Note: The 2006 and 2008 editions were abandoned due to waterlogging)
2007	Verasi	6	Jamie Moore	Gary L. Moore
	no race 2008
2009	Burton Port	5	Tony McCoy	Nicky Henderson
	no race 2010–11 (Note: The 2010 running was abandoned due to snow)
2012	Court in Motion	7	Leighton Aspell	Emma Lavelle
2013	Black Thunder	6	Nick Scholfield	Paul Nicholls
2014	Virak	5	Nick Scholfield	Paul Nicholls
2015	Southfield Royale	5	Wayne Hutchinson	Neil Mulholland
2016	Present Man	6	Jack Sherwood	Paul Nicholls
2017	Keeper Hill	6	Gavin Sheehan	Warren Greatrex
2018	Rocky's Treasure	7	David Bass	Kim Bailey
2019	Sam Spinner	7	Joe Colliver	Jedd O'Keeffe
2020	Hurricane Harvey	6	Paddy Brennan	Fergal O'Brien
2021	Threeunderthrufive	6	Adrian Heskin	Paul Nicholls
	no race 2022

== See also ==
- Horse racing in Great Britain
- List of British National Hunt races
