= Rendlesham Hurdle =

Hurdle horse race in Britain

Rendlesham Hurdle
2026
Lud'or	Henri The Second	Lavida Adiva

Previous years
2025
Gwennie May Boy	Beauport	Botox Has
2024
Botox Has	Butch	Martha Brae
2023
Wakool	Itchy Feet	Ashtown Lad
2022
Wholestone	Top Ville Ben	Third Wind
2021
Third Wind	Lisnagar Oscar	On The Blind Side

2020-2011
2020
Emitom	Donna's Diamond	One Night In Milan
2019
Shades Of Midnight	Petticoat Tails	Kilcooley
2018
Donna's Diamond	Agrapart	No Hassle Hoff
2017
Zarkandar	Aux Ptits Soins	Agrapart
2016
Reve De Sivola	One Track Mind	Silsol
2015
Closing Ceremony	Seeyouatmidnight	Milansbar
2014
Seeyouatmidnight	Mickie	Celestial Halo
2013
Across The Bay	Trustan Times	Cross Kennon
2012
Restless Harry	Cross Kennon	Featherbed Lane
2011
Cross Kennon	Bensalem	Kayf Aramis

2010-2001
2010
Souffleur	Kayf Aramis	Bouggler
2009
Kasbah Bliss	Hills of Aran	Duc De Regniere
2008
Kasbah Bliss	Lough Derg	Accordello
2007
Labelthou	Afrad	Material World
2006
Royal Emperor	Millenium Royal	Crystal d'Ainay
2005
Crystal d'Ainay	Monet's Garden	Royal Rosa
2004
Monkerhostin	Mistanoora	Deano's Beeno
2003
Deano's Beeno	Palua	Stromness
2002
Baracouda	Sleeping Night	Kates Charm
2001
Merry Masquerade	Teaatral	Audacter

2000-1991
2000
Teaatral	Merry Masquerade	Effectual
1999
Pharanear	Anzum	Ivor's Flutter
1998
Buckhouse Boy	Gysart	Pleasure Shared
1997
Pharanear	Conquering Leader	Escartefigue
1996
See Enough	Mole Board	Seekin Cash
1995
Cyborgo	Top Spin	Bog Frog
1994
Balasani	Cab on Target	Truth Be Told
1993
Baydon Star	Grace Card	Sayyure
1992
Forest Sun	Cab on Target	Holy Joe
1991
Floyd	Ryde Again	The Illywhacker

1990-1988
1990
Old Dundalk	Sprowston Boy	Calabrese
1989
Cliffalda	King's College Boy	Voyant
1988
King's College Boy	Nick The Brief	Alone Success

The Rendlesham Hurdle is a Grade 2 National Hunt hurdle race in Great Britain which is open to horses aged four years or older. It is run at Haydock Park over a distance of about 3 miles and ½ a furlong (3 miles and 58 yards, or 4,881 metres), and during its running there are twelve hurdles to be jumped. The race is scheduled to take place each year in February.

The race was first run in 1980 and was initially held at Kempton Park. It was a limited handicap from 1995 to 2001.

The race was transferred to Haydock in 2006, and its distance here was initially 2 miles and 7½ furlongs. It was extended to 3 miles in 2008, and then to 3 miles and 1 furlong for 2009 and 2010 before reverting to 3 miles in 2011 and being cut to 2 miles and 7 furlongs in 2012. It has been run at its present distance since 2019. The race is currently sponsored by William Hill and was run under various sponsored titles between 2010 and 2016.

The Rendlesham Hurdle serves as an important trial for the Stayers' Hurdle in March. The last horse to win both races in the same year was Baracouda in 2002.

== Winners ==
Year	Winner	Age	Jockey	Trainer
1980	Derring Rose	5	Andy Turnell	Alan Jarvis
1981	Derring Rose	6	John Francome	Fred Winter
1982	Hill of Slane	6	Andy Turnell	Alan Jarvis
1983	Mellie	8	Sam Morshead	R Blakeney
1984	Gaye Chance	9	Sam Morshead	Mercy Rimell
1985	Abandoned due to frost
1986	Abandoned due to frost
1987	Aonoch	8	Jimmy Duggan	Sally Oliver
1988	King's College Boy	10	Graham Bradley	Monica Dickinson
1989	Cliffalda	6	Tom Morgan	John Edwards
1990	Old Dundalk	6	Michael Bowlby	David Murray Smith
1991	Floyd	11	Graham Bradley	David Elsworth
1992	Forest Sun	7	Jimmy Frost	Toby Balding
1993	Baydon Star	6	Richard Dunwoody	David Nicholson
1994	Balasani	8	Richard Dunwoody	Martin Pipe
1995	Cyborgo	5	Richard Dunwoody	Martin Pipe
1996	See Enough	8	Anthony Tory	Bob Buckler
1997	Pharanear	7	Adrian Maguire	David Nicholson
1998	Buckhouse Boy	8	Andrew Thornton	David Nicholson
1999	Pharanear	9	Robert Thornton	David Nicholson
2000	Teaatral	6	Dean Gallagher	Charles Egerton
2001	Merry Masquerade	10	Andrew Thornton	Mary Reveley
2002	Baracouda	7	Thierry Doumen	François Doumen
2003	Deano's Beeno	11	Tony McCoy	Martin Pipe
2004	Monkerhostin	7	Richard Johnson	Philip Hobbs
2005	Crystal d'Ainay	6	Robert Thornton	Alan King
2006	Royal Emperor	10	Padge Whelan	Sue Smith
2007	Labelthou	8	Barry Fenton	Emma Lavelle
2008	Kasbah Bliss	6	Barry Keniry	François Doumen
2009	Kasbah Bliss	7	Christophe Pieux	François Doumen
2010	Souffleur	7	Tom O'Brien	Peter Bowen
2011	Cross Kennon	7	Alan O'Keefe	Jenny Candlish
2012	Restless Harry	8	Henry Oliver	Robin Dickin
2013	Across The Bay	9	Henry Brooke	Donald McCain
2014	Seeyouatmidnight	6	Ryan Mania	Sandy Thomson
2015	Closing Ceremony	6	Richie McLernon	Emma Lavelle
2016	Reve De Sivola	11	Richard Johnson	Nick Williams
2017	Zarkandar	10	Harry Cobden	Paul Nicholls
2018	Donna's Diamond	9	Callum Bewley	Chris Grant
2019	Shades Of Midnight	9	Henry Brooke	Sandy Thomson
2020	Emitom	6	Gavin Sheehan	Warren Greatrex
2021	Third Wind	7	Tom Cannon	Hughie Morrison
2022	Wholestone	11	Sam Twiston-Davies	Nigel Twiston-Davies
2023	Wakool	7	Conor O'Farrell	Nick Alexander
2024	Botox Has	8	Caoilin Quinn	Gary Moore
2025	Gwennie May Boy	7	Charlie Todd	Dan Skelton
2026	Lud'or	6	Gavin Sheehan	Tom Symonds

== See also ==
- Horse racing in Great Britain
- List of British National Hunt races
