= Baracouda =

French-bred Thoroughbred racehorse (1995–2023)

- Sire: Alesso
- Dam: Peche Aubar
- Damsire: Zino
- Sex: Gelding
- Foaled: 1995
- Died: 9 February 2023 (aged 28)
- Country: France
- Colour: Bay
- Breeder: R Dupuis
- Owner: JP McManus
- Trainer: Francois Doumen
- Record: 34: 18-8-2
- Earnings: £774,412

Major wins
- Prix Leon Olry-Roederer (2000); Long Walk Hurdle (2000, 2001, 2003, 2004); National Spirit Hurdle (2001); Prix Hypothese (2001); Distance Championship Hurdle (2001); Ascot Hurdle (2001, 2002); Rendlesham Hurdle (2002); World Hurdle (2002, 2003); Long Distance Hurdle (2003, 2004); Heroes Handicap Hurdle (2004)

Baracouda (1995 – 9 February 2023) was a top staying hurdler for racehorse trainer François Doumen in the late 1990s and early first decade of the 21st century. Amongst his major successes, he won the Stayers Championship, the World Hurdle twice, as well as winning 10 consecutive races between November 2000 and November 2002. He holds the record for winning Ascot's Grade 1 Long Walk Hurdle 4 times (one won at Windsor during Ascot redevelopment).

== Races ==
After starting his career as a flat racer in France, he was sent to trainer François Doumen after finishing 5th on hurdles at his debut at Auteuil. He would win three (including Grade 2) and finish second three times (including Grade 1) in his first half dozen starts for Doumen.

Next up was a visit to Britain where Doumen had been so synonymous with success down the years. As a 5 year old novice he went into Ascot's Grade 1 Long Walk Hurdle in December against seasoned and top class staying hurdlers. He won by 14 lengths from favourite Deano's Beeno. Afterwards he and brilliant chaser First Gold were bought privately by Irish businessman JP McManus for an undisclosed sum.

In his next start he gave weight and beat 9 rivals at Fontwell in the National Spirit Hurdle but his intended target, the Stayers' Hurdle at Cheltenham, was missed after the Festival was cancelled due to the 2001 foot-and-mouth outbreak.

Baracouda instead stayed home to win a Grade 3 at Auteuil before returning to the UK for a rescheduled and unofficial championship event at Sandown in April. Baracouda defeated 10 rivals to win by 3 lengths from Carlovent.

Baracouda returned to action the following Autumn defeating subsequent Champion Hurdler Hors La Loi III by 9 lengths in the Ascot Hurdle before winning his second Long Walk. In one of his high ranking performances he won the Grade 1 by 24 lengths.

In his Cheltenham warm up he swon a slowly run Rendlesham at Kempton before his first race at Cheltenham in the 2002 Stayers Hurdle.

Baracouda faced 15 rivals with Irish stayer, Bannow Bay. won a slowly runHe entered the race as a strong favorite. Racing dead last for most of the first circuit he slowly but surely picked his way through the field under Thierry Doumen. Turning for home it was evident that Bannow Bay and Baracouda were going far better than their rivals. As Bannow Bay challenged Charlie Swan sent Bannow Bay on going to the last. Thierry Doumen tracked him and went second shortly before jumping it. Bannow Bay found the response he'd promised Swan yet Doumen brought Baracouda alongside halfway up the run in and despite only hands and heels urging he was winning by a neck from Bannow Bay; the pair 13 lengths clear of third It Takes Time.

The following season despite talk of a switch to fences he remained over hurdles starting out in a four-runner renewal of the Ascot Hurdle. Despite the small field it turned out to be one of the most dramatic races of the season. AP McCoy sensing a complete lack of urgency at the start sent his mount Mr Cool off in front and he was 20L clear at the first. That advantage had doubled by halfway and he was almost a hurdle ahead as the runners left Swinley Bottom. Baracouda with his customary hold-up tactics looked to have an insurmountable task turning in as he went into second still more than 30L behind. He had halved the deficit at the last but it still looked impossible until Mr Cool weakened on the final hill. Baracouda was closing all the while but never looking like he could quite get there however, in a slow motion finish he eventually reeled Mr Cool in to win by a neck. The pair were a distance clear of the other two.

The race was considered dramatic, as Mr. Cool led early before being overtaken by Baracouda in the final.

There was no Stayer's prep this year, as he went straight to Cheltenham for an anticipated renewal of the race. Baracouda would face off with Irish legend Limestone Lad, a front-running winner of 35 races including 4 top level successes. Throw in crack novice Iris's Gift and Cleeve Hurdle winner Classified and this was one of the best staying hurdles ever run. Limestone Lad set a swinging gallop under Paul Carberry and led the field down the hill second time. Iris's Gift was cruising in second with Baracouda. The rest struggled in behind as these three turned almost in unison. Baracouda hit the front before the last but Iris's Gift was almost upsides jumping the last. As Limestone Lad cried enough, Baracouda and Iris's Gift went toe-to-toe with the French horse narrowly in front. Iris's Gift dug deeper than ever before but he just could not get past and Baracouda and regained his crown by a narrow margin

The following season began at Newbury in the Long Distance Hurdle where he gained revenge on Deano's Beeno beating him by 7 lengths. He was also to regain his Long Walk title that winter as he defeated a Grade 1 field beating old rivals Mr Cool and Deano's Beeno by 30 lengths and more.

A Sandown handicap where he gave all rivals at least 25lbs followed as he won comfortably by 2 lengths from Yogi to set up a bid for a third Stayers Hurdle. Iris's Gift who had only had one race that season kept fresh for this was to gain his revenge 12 months on. Baracouda as ever crept into contention and challenged looking the likely winner at the last but against his younger rival he just couldn't quite get past. It was just his second defeat in 16 starts.

The following year started in familiar fashion with wins in the Long Distance Hurdle at Newbury and Long Walk that year run at Windsor. Both times he beat Crystal D'Ainay relatively narrowly. With Iris's Gift out of favour many thought he could regain his Stayer's Crown but this time lost to Inglis Drever.

Baracouda only raced twice in his final season. He was second again to Inglis Drever in the Long Distance Hurdle before bowing out with a fifth place finish in the Stayer's won by My Way De Solzen. It was the second time in 27 races that he failed to finish in the first two.

== Retirement and death ==
Baracouda retired with 18 wins, 7 at Grade 1 level with four Long Walk Hurdles, a record. He retired to owner JP McManus's Martinstown Stud, where he died in February 2023, at the age of 28.
