= Hors La Loi III =

French racehorse

- Sire: Cyborg
- Dam: Quintessence III
- Damsire: El Condor
- Sex: Gelding
- Foaled: 1995
- Country: France
- Colour: Bay
- Breeder: François Cottin
- Owner: J D Martin; Paul Green
- Trainer: François Doumen; Martin Pipe; James Fanshawe; Paul Nicholls
- Record: 33: 9-4-7
- Earnings: £419,855

Major wins
- Summit Junior Hurdle (1998); Finesse Juvenile Novices' Hurdle (1999); Supreme Novices' Hurdle (1999); Anniversary 4-Y-O Novices' Hurdle (1999); Kingwell Hurdle (2000, 2002); Champion Hurdle (2002)

Hors La Loi III (foaled 22 February 1995) was a French-bred AQPS racehorse who won the 2002 Champion Hurdle. A dark bay gelding with a narrow blaze and white hind feet, he developed a reputation for being rather inconsistent, but was one of the most talented hurdlers of his era with a peak rating of 165.

== Background ==
Hors La Loi III was bred in France by François Cottin. His sire Cyborg, was a thoroughbred who specialised in producing jumpers. Hors La Loi's dam was the non-thoroughbred mare Quintessence (described in some sources as a Selle Français), who also produced his full-brother Cyborgo, winner of the 1996 Stayers' Hurdle. The post-nominal "III" was added to distinguish him from a successful, but less notable thoroughbred racehorse, who had already been registered as "Hors La Loi".

== Racing career ==
=== 1998–1999: Early career ===
Hors La Loi III first went into training with François Doumen in France and was ridden in most of his early races by the trainer's son Thierry. He began his career in 1998, running without success in four races on the flat at provincial tracks. Switched to jumping he won on his hurdling debut at Auteuil and was then aimed at races in Britain where he was unbeaten in four starts that season. In December he led early and recorded a sixteen length win in the Grade II Summit Junior Hurdle at Lingfield, and a month later he followed up with another easy win in the Grade II Finesse Juvenile Novices' Hurdle at Cheltenham beating the Tolworth Hurdle winner Behrajan by eight lengths.

After these two successes he was moved to the stable of Martin Pipe for the remainder of the season. Unusually for a four-year-old, he was not aimed at the Triumph Hurdle at the Cheltenham Festival, instead taking on older Novices in the Supreme Novices' Hurdle. Ridden for the first time by AP McCoy he put in an impressive performance, moving into the lead three flights from home and pulling away to win by seventeen lengths in a time that was 2.2 seconds faster than that recorded by Istabraq in winning the Champion Hurdle one hour later. His performance was described by The Independent's correspondent as one of "the most impressive at the Festival". A month later, Hors La Loi and McCoy came together again for another easy win in the Anniversary 4-Y-O Novices' Hurdle at Aintree. He had established himself as the leading Novice in the British Isles and a potential challenger to Istabraq for the following season's Championship.

=== 1999–2001: Championship contender ===
Returned to François Doumen's stable for the 1999/2000 season, Hors La Loi began with two disappointing efforts at Auteuil, but once again showed improved form when raced in England. In February he won the Grade II Kingwell Hurdle at Wincanton, an important trial for the Champion Hurdle. He had some problems in training, and his connections considered running him in the Stayers' Hurdle before opting for the Championship. At Cheltenham, he went off as at 11-1 and ran up to expectations, but was no match for Istabraq, finishing a four-length second. As a result of this effort he was made odds-on favourite for the Aintree Hurdle, but after leading three hurdles from the finish, he weakened badly and finished a disappointing fourth.

The 2000/2001 season proved to be disappointing. Moved to the stable of James Fanshawe, he managed a fair second in the Kingwell Hurdle, but was pulled up in his other three starts, including a substitute Championship race at Sandown (the Cheltenham Festival was cancelled because of the foot-and-mouth outbreak). By the end of the year his official rating had fallen 15 pounds to a mark of 150, well below Championship standard. James Fanshawe was later to say of this season "We couldn't get him to do a thing... He was an embarrassment".

=== 2001–2002: Champion hurdler ===
The early part of the 2001–2002 season saw signs that Hors la Loi was adjusting to his new environment. He put in place efforts in the Ascot Hurdle, Bula Hurdle and Christmas Hurdle against top class opposition. A three and a half-length victory in the 2002 Kingwell Hurdle saw him back amongst the leading contenders for the championship. Most of the interest, however, was on Istabraq, attempting to win an unprecedented fourth title, and the Christmas Hurdle winner Valiramix.

In the Champion Hurdle, Hors La Loi was sent off 10-1 fourth favourite. In an eventful and controversial race, he raced prominently, took the lead two flights from home, and pulled away to win by three lengths under Dean Gallagher, who had "never lost faith" in the horse. His triumph was somewhat overshadowed by the runs of Istabraq, who was pulled up early in the race, and Valiramix, who suffered a fatal injury when falling on the home turn.

=== 2002–2006: Later career ===
Hors la Loi never recaptured his Championship form. In 2002/2003 he ran five times without success, his best effort being a third place in the Kingwell Hurdle. At Cheltenham, his Championship defence ended when his stubborn temperament came to the fore, as he refused to race and was left at the start.

His retirement was announced in June 2003, with his owner citing ongoing back problems, but, more than two years later, Hors La Loi re-appeared as a Novice Chaser, now under the care of Paul Nicholls. According to RTÉ he produced some "magnificent leaps" to win at Taunton in December 2005 and recorded placed efforts in good races later in the season, including one back at Wincanton. He was finally retired after running unplaced as a 40-1 outsider in the Jewson Novices' Handicap Chase at the 2006 Cheltenham Festival.

== Pedigree ==
Pedigree of Hors La Loi III (FR), bay gelding, 1995
Sire Cyborg (FR) 1982	Arctic Tern; 1973	Sea Bird	Dan Cupid
Sire Cyborg (FR) 1982	Arctic Tern; 1973	Sea Bird	Sicalade
Sire Cyborg (FR) 1982	Arctic Tern; 1973	Bubbling Beauty	Hasty Road
Sire Cyborg (FR) 1982	Arctic Tern; 1973	Bubbling Beauty	Almahmoud
Sire Cyborg (FR) 1982	Cadair; 1970	Sadair	Petare
Sire Cyborg (FR) 1982	Cadair; 1970	Sadair	Blue Missy
Sire Cyborg (FR) 1982	Cadair; 1970	Blarney Castle	Nasrullah
Sire Cyborg (FR) 1982	Cadair; 1970	Blarney Castle	Bold Irish
Dam Quintessence (FR) 1982	El Condor; 1974	Misti	Medium
Dam Quintessence (FR) 1982	El Condor; 1974	Misti	Mist
Dam Quintessence (FR) 1982	El Condor; 1974	Amicla	Argel
Dam Quintessence (FR) 1982	El Condor; 1974	Amicla	Ardan Traffic
Dam Quintessence (FR) 1982	Graziella; 1972	Fujiyama	Krakatao
Dam Quintessence (FR) 1982	Graziella; 1972	Fujiyama	Peccadille
Dam Quintessence (FR) 1982	Graziella; 1972	Cleopatre	Eperon
Dam Quintessence (FR) 1982	Graziella; 1972	Cleopatre	Ugia
