= Heroes Handicap Hurdle =

British horse race

Heroes Handicap Hurdle
2026
Henri The Second	Santos Blue	Hartington

Previous years
2025
Red Dirt Road	Henri The Second	Goshen
2024
Saint Davy	Hermino Aa	Dubrovnik Harry
2023
Green Book	Call Me Lord	Jet Of Magic
2022
Green Book	Beauport	Dans Le Vent

2020-2011
2020
Limited Reserve	Ask Dillon	Go Whatever
2019
Lord Napier	Coole Cody	Flemcara
2018
Topofthegame	Golan Fortune	Melrose Boy
2017
Lord of the Island	Fortunate George	Fountains Windfall
2016
Saddlers Encore	Join The Clan	Yala Enki
2015
Invicta Lake	El Dancer	Hansupfordetroit
2011
Kilcrea Kim	Alfie Spinner	Dantari

2020-2001
2010
Beshabar	Erzen	Chief Yeoman
2009
Chief Yeoman	Ballydub	Night Cru
2008
The Tother One	Warne's Way	Hills of Aran
2007
Taranis	Whispered Secret	Verasi
2006
Ungaro	Sh Boom	Material World
2005
Supreme Serenade	Fountain Hill	Gallery God
2004
Baracouda	Yogi	Alexanderthegreat
2003
Chopneyev	Camden Tanner	Whistling Dixie
2002
Iris Royal	Surprising	Carlovent
2001
The Extra Man	Ballet-K	Zabari

2000-1991
2000
Rubhahunish	Brandon Court	Teaatral
1999
Teaatral	Just Nip	Melody Maid
1998
Buckhouse Boy	Outset	Mistinguett
1997
Tullymurry Toff	Yahmi	Outset
1996
Trainglot	Lucky Blue	Runaway Pete
1995
Miracle Man	Olympian	Meditator
1994
Dark Honey	Dominant Serenade	Olympian
1993
Trainglot	Sweet Duke	Peanuts Pet
1992
Black Sapphire	Holy Joe	Balasani
1991
Rouyan	Yaheeb	Gay Ruffian

1990-1988
1989
Special Vintage	Ryde Again	Cliffalda
1988
Hill-Street-Blues	Ruby Flight	Mynah Key

The Heroes Handicap Hurdle is a Premier Handicap National Hunt hurdle race in Great Britain which is open to horses aged four years or older. It is run at Sandown Park over a distance of about 2 miles and 7½ furlongs (2 miles 7 furlongs and 98 yards, or 4,716 metres), and during its running there are twelve hurdles to be jumped. It is a handicap race, and it is scheduled to take place each year in late January or early February.

The race was established in 1986, and it was originally run over 2 miles, 5 furlongs and 75 yards (4,293 metres). This was increased to its present length in 1993. The event's current title was introduced in 2008, prior to which it was known as the Sandown Handicap Hurdle. For much of its history the race was sponsored by Tote Bookmakers, and its title promoted such bets as the Tote Jackpot and the Tote Scoop6. Since 2020 it has been sponsored by Betway.

== Winners ==
- Weights given in stones and pounds.

Year	Winner	Age	Weight	Jockey	Trainer
1986	Hooray Henry	6	10-05	Hywel Davies	J. B. Sayers
1987	Taberna Lord	6	09-10	Luke Harvey	Jim Wilson
1988	Hill-Street-Blues	10	10-02	Stan Moore	Jimmy Fox
1989	Special Vintage	9	10–12	Mark Dwyer	Jimmy FitzGerald
1990	Abandoned due to waterlogging
1991	Rouyan	5	10-00	Billy Morris	Rod Simpson
1992	Black Sapphire	5	10-00	Brendan Powell	Mark Tompkins
1993	Trainglot	6	10-02	Mark Dwyer	Jimmy FitzGerald
1994	Dark Honey	9	09-11	Tony Dicken	Simon Dow
1995	Miracle Man	7	10-00	Peter Hobbs	Colin Weedon
1996	Trainglot	9	11-01	Richard Dunwoody	Jimmy FitzGerald
1997	Tullymurry Toff	6	10–12	Eddie Callaghan	Malcolm Jefferson
1998	Buckhouse Boy	8	11-03	Norman Williamson	David Nicholson
1999	Teaatral	5	10-02	Dean Gallagher	Charles Egerton
2000	Rubhahunish	9	10-06	Jamie Goldstein	Nigel Twiston-Davies
2001	The Extra Man	7	10-00	Robert Thornton	Mick Ryan
2002	Iris Royal	6	09-11	Marcus Foley	Nicky Henderson
2003	Chopneyev	5	10-05	Richard Johnson	Richard Phillips
2004	Baracouda	9	11–12	Thierry Doumen	François Doumen
2005	Supreme Serenade	6	10-10	Paul Flynn	Philip Hobbs
2006	Ungaro	7	10-08	Jim Crowley	Keith Reveley
2007	Taranis	6	10-03	Ruby Walsh	Paul Nicholls
2008	The Tother One	7	10-09	Sam Thomas	Paul Nicholls
2009	Chief Yeoman	9	10-10	Aidan Coleman	Venetia Williams
2010	Beshabar	8	09-11	Harry Skelton	Paul Nicholls
2011	Kilcrea Kim	6	10–12	Richard Johnson	Philip Hobbs
2012	Abandoned due to frost
2013	Abandoned due to waterlogging on the hurdle course
2014	Abandoned due to waterlogging on the hurdle course
2015	Invicta Lake	8	10-09	Tom O'Brien	Suzy Smith
2016	Saddlers Encore	7	10-05	Richard Johnson	Philip Hobbs
2017	Lord of the Island	9	10-10	Willie Twiston-Davies	Fergal O'Brien
2018	Topofthegame	6	11-07	Sam Twiston-Davies	Paul Nicholls
2019	Lord Napier	6	10-08	Sean Bowen	Peter Bowen
2020	Limited Reserve	8	09-12	Jack Tudor	Christian Williams
2021	Abandoned due to waterlogging on the hurdle course
2022	Green Book	5	10-06	Charlie Deutsch	Venetia Williams
2023	Green Book	6	11-04	Charlie Deutsch	Venetia Williams
2024	Saint Davy	7	11-01	Jonjo O'Neill Jr	Jonjo O'Neill
2025	Red Dirt Road	8	11-02	Jonjo O'Neill Jr	Jonjo O'Neill
2026	Henri The Second	9	11-04	Harry Cobden	Paul Nicholls

== See also ==
- Horseracing in Great Britain
- List of British National Hunt races
- Recurring events established in 1986 – this race is included under its former title, Sandown Handicap Hurdle.
