= Long Walk Hurdle =

Hurdle horse race in Britain

- Class: Grade 1
- Location: Ascot Racecourse; Berkshire, England
- Inaugurated: 1965
- Race type: Hurdle
- Sponsor: Howden
- Website: Ascot

Race information
- Distance: 3m 102y (4,921 metres)
- Surface: Turf
- Track: Right-handed
- Qualification: Four-years-old and up
- Weight: 11 st 6 lb (4yo); 11 st 7 lb (5yo+); Allowances; 7 lb for mares
- Purse: £125,000 (2025); 1st: £71,188

Long Walk Hurdle
2025
Impose Toi	Strong Leader	Honesty Policy

Previous years
2024
Crambo	Hiddenvalley Lake	Beauport
2023
Crambo	Paisley Park	Dashel Drasher
2022
Paisley Park	Goshen	Champ
2021
Champ	Thyme Hill	Paisley Park

2020-2011
2020
Paisley Park	Thyme Hill	Roksana
2019
The Worlds End	L'Ami Serge	Papagana
2018
Paisley Park	West Approach	Top Notch
2017
Sam Spinner	L'Ami Serge	Unowhatimeanharry
2016
Unowhatimeanharry	Lil Rockerfeller	Un Temps Pour Tout
2015
Thistlecrack	Reve De Sivola	Deputy Dan
2014
Reve De Sivola	Zarkandar	Aubusson
2013
Reve De Sivola	Salubrious	Tweedledrum
2012
Reve De Sivola	Smad Place	Trustan Times
2011
Big Buck's	Five Dream	Restless Harry

2010-2001
2010
Big Buck's	Lough Derg	Restless Harry
2009
Big Buck's	Karabak	Diamond Harry
2008
Punchestowns	Duc De Regniere	Mobaasher
2007
Lough Derg	Hardy Eustace	Black Jack Ketchum
2006
Mighty Man	Lough Derg	Temoin
2005
My Way de Solzen	Neptune Collonges	Starzaan
2004
Baracouda	Crystal d'Ainay	Rule Supreme
2003
Baracouda	Mr Cool	Deano's Beeno
2002
Deano's Beeno	Baracouda	Native Emperor
2001
Baracouda	Ballet-K	Carlovent

2000-1991
2000
Baracouda	Deano's Beeno	Celtic Native
1999
Anzum	Deano's Beeno	Count Campioni
1998
Princeful	Deano's Beeno	Ocean Hawk
1997
Paddy's Return	Pridwell	Bimsey
1996
Ocean Hawk	Trainglot	Pleasure Shared
1995
Silver Wedge	Putty Road	Top Spin
1994
Hebridean	Dorans Pride	What A Question
1993
Sweet Duke	Burgoyne	Avro Anson
1992
Vagog	Burgoyne	Shuil Ar Aghaidh

1990-1987
1990
Floyd	Ryde Again	Boscean Chieftain
1989
Royal Athlete	Mrs Muck	Pragada
1988
French Goblin	Gaye Brief	Tewit Castle
1987
Bluff Cove	Miss Nero	Sabin Du Loir

The Long Walk Hurdle is a Grade 1 National Hunt hurdle race in Great Britain which is open to horses aged four years or older. It is run at Ascot over a distance of about 3 miles and half a furlong (3 miles and 102 yards, or 4,921 metres), and there are twelve hurdles to be jumped. The race is scheduled to take place each year in December.

The event is named after The Long Walk, an avenue of trees in Windsor Great Park. It was first run in 1965, and it was initially a handicap race. It became a conditions race in 1971, and it was given Grade 1 status in 1990. Prior to the redevelopment of Ascot Racecourse, which took place during the period 2004–06, the distance of the race was 3 miles and 1½ furlongs.

Since 1971, six winners of the Long Walk Hurdle have gone on to win the Stayers' Hurdle in the same season – Derring Rose (1980–81), Baracouda (2001–02), My Way de Solzen (2005–06), Big Buck's (2009–10, 2010–11 and 2011–12), Thistlecrack (2015–16) and Paisley Park (2018–19).

== Records ==
Most successful horse (4 wins):

- Baracouda – 2000, 2001, 2003, 2004

Leading jockey (4 wins):

- Richard Johnson – Anzum (1999), Mighty Man (2006), Reve di Sivola (2012, 2013)

Leading trainer (4 wins):

- François Doumen – Baracouda (2000, 2001, 2003, 2004)

== Winners since 1971 ==
Year	Winner	Age	Jockey	Trainer
1971	St Patrick's Blue	6	Bill Smith	David Tatlow
1972	Highland Abbe	6	Richard Smith (Note: amateur jockey)	Les Kennard
1973	Soloning	8	Richard Pitman	Fred Winter
1974	Go Bingo	5	David Munro	Sam Hall
1975	Lanzarote	7	John Francome	Fred Winter
1976	Abandoned due to frost
1977	John Cherry	6	Steve Smith Eccles	Harry Thomson Jones
1978	Kelso Chant	6	Steve Charlton	Jumbo Wilkinson
1979	John Cherry	8	Steve Smith Eccles	Harry Thomson Jones
1980	Derring Rose	5	John Francome	Fred Winter
1981	Abandoned due to snow
1982	Mayotte	7	Paul Richards	Richard Holder
1983	Crimson Embers	8	Stuart Shilston	Fulke Walwyn
1984	Kristenson	7	Michael Williams	Roger Fisher
1985	Misty Dale	7	Phil Tuck	Jenny Pitman
1986	Out of the Gloom	5	Peter Scudamore	Reg Hollinshead
1987	Bluff Cove	5	Richard Dunwoody	Reg Hollinshead
1988	French Goblin	5	Peter Hobbs	Josh Gifford
1989	Royal Athlete	6	Dean Gallagher	Jenny Pitman
1990	Floyd	10	Graham Bradley	David Elsworth
1991	Abandoned due to frost
1992	Vagog	7	Martin Foster	Martin Pipe
1993	Sweet Duke	6	Carl Llewellyn	Nigel Twiston-Davies
1994	Hebridean	7	Adrian Maguire	David Nicholson
1995	Silver Wedge	4	Jamie Osborne	Oliver Sherwood
1996	Ocean Hawk	4	Carl Llewellyn	Nigel Twiston-Davies
1997	Paddy's Return	5	Norman Williamson	Ferdy Murphy
1998	Princeful	7	Richard Dunwoody	Jenny Pitman
1999	Anzum	8	Richard Johnson	Alan King
2000	Baracouda	5	Thierry Doumen	François Doumen
2001	Baracouda	6	Thierry Doumen	François Doumen
2002	Deano's Beeno	10	Tony McCoy	Martin Pipe
2003	Baracouda	8	Thierry Doumen	François Doumen
2004 (Note: Due to the closure of Ascot Racecourse for redevelopment, the race was switched to Windsor in 2004, and Chepstow in 2005)	Baracouda	9	Tony McCoy	François Doumen
2005	My Way de Solzen	5	Robert Thornton	Alan King
2006	Mighty Man	6	Richard Johnson	Henry Daly
2007	Lough Derg	7	Tom Scudamore	David Pipe
2008	Punchestowns	5	Barry Geraghty	Nicky Henderson
2009 (Note: It took place at Newbury in 2009 and 2010 after the original fixtures at Ascot were cancelled due to snow)	Big Buck's	6	Ruby Walsh	Paul Nicholls
2010	Big Buck's	7	Tony McCoy	Paul Nicholls
2011	Big Buck's	8	Ruby Walsh	Paul Nicholls
2012	Reve De Sivola	7	Richard Johnson	Nick Williams
2013	Reve De Sivola	8	Richard Johnson	Nick Williams
2014	Reve De Sivola	9	Daryl Jacob	Nick Williams
2015	Thistlecrack	7	Tom Scudamore	Colin Tizzard
2016	Unowhatimeanharry	8	Barry Geraghty	Harry Fry
2017	Sam Spinner	5	Joe Colliver	Jedd O'Keeffe
2018	Paisley Park	6	Aidan Coleman	Emma Lavelle
2019	The Worlds End	8	Adrian Heskin	Tom George
2020	Paisley Park	8	Aidan Coleman	Emma Lavelle
2021	Champ	9	Jonjo O'Neill Jr	Nicky Henderson
2022 (Note: The 2022 running took place at Kempton Park after the original Ascot fixture was abandoned due to frozen ground)	Paisley Park	10	Aidan Coleman	Emma Lavelle
2023	Crambo	6	Jonathan Burke	Fergal O'Brien
2024	Crambo	7	Jonathan Burke	Fergal O'Brien
2025	Impose Toi	7	Nico de Boinville	Nicky Henderson

== See also ==
- Horse racing in Great Britain
- List of British National Hunt races
