= Istabraq =

Irish-bred Thoroughbred racehorse (1992–2024)

- Sire: Sadler's Wells
- Grandsire: Northern Dancer
- Dam: Betty's Secret
- Damsire: Secretariat
- Sex: Gelding
- Foaled: 23 May 1992
- Died: 25 July 2024 (aged 32)
- Country: Ireland
- Colour: Bay
- Breeder: Shadwell Estate Co.
- Owner: Sheikh Hamdan bin Rashid Al Maktoum; John P. McManus
- Trainer: John Gosden; Aidan O'Brien
- Record: 40: 25-7-0; 11: 2-4-0 (Flat); 29: 23-3-0 (Hurdle)
- Earnings: £1,053,385

Major wins
- Champion Hurdle (1998, 1999, 2000); Irish Champion Hurdle (1998, 1999, 2000, 2001); Future Champions Novice Hurdle (1996); Royal Bond Novice Hurdle (1996); Deloitte Novice Hurdle (1997); Royal & SunAlliance Novices' Hurdle (1997); Punchestown Champion Novice Hurdle (1997); Hatton's Grace Hurdle (1997, 1998); December Festival Hurdle (1997, 1998, 1999, 2001); Aintree Hurdle (1999); Punchestown Champion Hurdle (1999); John James McManus Memorial Hurdle (1997, 1998, 1999)

Awards
- Timeform rating: 180

Honours
- Istabraq Festival Hurdle at Leopardstown
- Last updated on 25 July 2024

Istabraq (23 May 1992 – 25 July 2024) was an Irish Thoroughbred racehorse who was most famous for his hurdling. He won the Champion Hurdle on three consecutive occasions. He was trained by Aidan O'Brien and owned by John Patrick McManus. Jockey Charlie Swan rode him in all of his 29 races over jumps. Istabraq is regarded as one of the greatest ever over hurdles.

== Early life ==
Istabraq was bred for the flat, being by the champion sire Sadler's Wells, who won the Irish 2,000 Guineas, and also being three parts brother to Epsom Derby winner Secreto. On his dam's side the horse was a descendant of US Triple Crown winner Secretariat. Istabraq was tried unsuccessfully over a mile and failed to please his handlers and owner Sheikh Hamdan bin Rashid Al Maktoum of Shadwell Racing and a partner in his family's Godolphin Stables.

== Jumps racing ==
The horse was sold to John Durkan who had been an assistant to John Gosden with the Baring Bingham Novices' Hurdle as the target for the Cheltenham Festival. Durkan started training the horse but was diagnosed with leukemia and suggested that Aidan O'Brien train Istabraq while he was ill. The agreement was that when Durkan recovered, he would take over the training. However, he died just before Istabraq won the 1998 Irish Champion Hurdle. O'Brien continued to train the horse afterwards, and Durkan remained in the thoughts of the horse's connections. When riding the horse back after his 1998 Champion Hurdle win, jockey Charlie Swan said, 'This one's for John,' in an interview with Channel 4's Lesley Graham.

=== 1996/1997: Novice hurdler ===
On 16 November 1996 Istabraq made his hurdling debut and lost by a head to Noble Thyne at Punchestown. Before his next race Istabraq was gelded. He won his next three races prior to the Cheltenham Festival. There he won the Royal & Sun Alliance Novice Hurdle from Mighty Moss.

=== 1997/1998 ===
Istabraq won the first four races of the season. In his fifth race of the season he started as favourite for the 1998 Champion Hurdle. Last years winner Make A Stand was a notable absence but the runner-up Theatreworld returned as one of the 18 runners. Istabraq moved to the front three out before he accelerated rounding the home turn. The Champion Hurdle then became a procession in the home straight, as Istabraq won by 12 lengths from Theatreworld. The conditions for the Aintree Hurdle were soft, heavy in places with Istabraq the favourite. However Istabraq came second to Pridwell to end Istabraq's 10 race winning streak. This was Istabraq's last race of the season.

=== 1998/1999 ===
Like last season, Istabraq won his first four races. In his fifth race of the season he started the 1999 Champion Hurdle as favourite. He won by 3 1/2 lengths from Theatreworld to win his second Champion Hurdle. In the next race he beat French Holly at the Aintree Hurdle. He won his last race of the season at the Punchestown festival.

=== 1999/2000 ===
Istabraq had his first start of the season in October at Tipperary in the John James McManus Memorial Hurdle. He beat Limestone Lad by 7 lengths. There was a rematch for Istabraq's second start of the season in the Hattons Grace Hurdle at Fairyhouse. This time Istabraq came second losing by 5 1/2 lengths to Limestone Lad also in soft conditions. Despite the loss Istabraq started the 2000 Champion Hurdle as favourite. He won by 4 lengths from Hors La Loi III. This victory was Istabraq's fourth straight win at the Cheltenham Festival. This was his last race of the season.

=== 2000/2001 ===
Istabraq made his reappearance at Leopardstown for the December Festival Hurdle. He battled with Moscow Flyer before he fell at the last. This was the first time Istabraq fell. The race was won by Moscow Flyer. After the race winning jockey Barry Geraghty said "I thought I had Istabraq beat going to the last, I was the only one going in the right direction." Istabraq's jockey Charlie Swan however said "He was tired but he always finds something, however, he's always been vulnerable in those sort of conditions. He felt well and as good as ever during the race." On his next start, Istabraq won but this time Moscow Flyer fell. In Istabraq's next start, Istabraq again fell at the final flight, with Moscow Flyer the winner. After Istabraq won the AIG Europe Champion Hurdle near the end of January he was the odds on ante post favourite for the 2001 Champion Hurdle. However before the 2001 Cheltenham Festival, cases of foot-and-mouth disease started to appear in Britain. The festival was therefore abandoned.

=== 2001/2002 ===
Istabraq reappeared the following season to defeat Bust Out by a head in the December Festival Hurdle. In the 2002 Champion Hurdle Istabraq was the favourite of the 15 runners. However Swan pulled him up after 2 hurdles. The race was won by Hors La Loi III. After the race Swan said "I jumped the first and his action went. I jumped the second and thought he might get a bit better but he didn't and I just thought, for the good of the horse, to pull him up". Istabraq was found to have a tendon injury after the race and was retired.

== Retirement and death ==
After retirement Istabraq was moved to Martinstown, home of owner J. P. McManus.

Istabraq died at Martinstown Stud on 25 July 2024, at the age of 32.

== Legacy ==
His main trainer, Aidan O'Brien, considered Istabraq "the horse of a lifetime" who was like a member of his family and a "mystical character" on account of his legacy.

== Pedigree ==
Pedigree of Istabraq, bay gelding, 1992
Sire Sadler's Wells (USA) b. 1981	Northern Dancer (CAN) b. 1961	Nearctic (CAN) br. 1954	Nearco (ITY)
Sire Sadler's Wells (USA) b. 1981	Northern Dancer (CAN) b. 1961	Nearctic (CAN) br. 1954	Lady Angela (GB)
Sire Sadler's Wells (USA) b. 1981	Northern Dancer (CAN) b. 1961	Natalma (USA) b. 1957	Native Dancer (USA)
Sire Sadler's Wells (USA) b. 1981	Northern Dancer (CAN) b. 1961	Natalma (USA) b. 1957	Almahmoud (USA)
Sire Sadler's Wells (USA) b. 1981	Fairy Bridge (USA) b. 1975	Bold Reason (USA) b. 1968	Hail To Reason (USA)
Sire Sadler's Wells (USA) b. 1981	Fairy Bridge (USA) b. 1975	Bold Reason (USA) b. 1968	Lalun (USA)
Sire Sadler's Wells (USA) b. 1981	Fairy Bridge (USA) b. 1975	Special (USA) b. 1969	Forli (ARG)
Sire Sadler's Wells (USA) b. 1981	Fairy Bridge (USA) b. 1975	Special (USA) b. 1969	Thong (USA)
Dam Betty's Secret (USA) ch. 1977	Secretariat (USA) ch. 1970	Bold Ruler (USA) b. 1954	Nasrullah (GB)
Dam Betty's Secret (USA) ch. 1977	Secretariat (USA) ch. 1970	Bold Ruler (USA) b. 1954	Miss Disco (USA)
Dam Betty's Secret (USA) ch. 1977	Secretariat (USA) ch. 1970	Somethingroyal (USA) b. 1952	Princequillo (IRE)
Dam Betty's Secret (USA) ch. 1977	Secretariat (USA) ch. 1970	Somethingroyal (USA) b. 1952	Imperatrice (USA)
Dam Betty's Secret (USA) ch. 1977	Betty Loraine (USA) ch. 1965	Prince John (USA) ch. 1953	Princequillo (IRE)
Dam Betty's Secret (USA) ch. 1977	Betty Loraine (USA) ch. 1965	Prince John (USA) ch. 1953	Not Afraid (USA)
Dam Betty's Secret (USA) ch. 1977	Betty Loraine (USA) ch. 1965	Gay Hostess (USA) ch. 1957	Royal Charger (GB)
Dam Betty's Secret (USA) ch. 1977	Betty Loraine (USA) ch. 1965	Gay Hostess (USA) ch. 1957	Your Hostess (USA)

Note: b. = Bay, br. = Brown, ch. = Chestnut

- Through his dam he is inbred 4x4 to Princequillo. This means that the stallion appears twice in the fourth generation of his pedigree.

== See also ==
- Repeat winners of horse races
