= Taunton Racecourse =

Horse racing venue in Taunton, England

Taunton
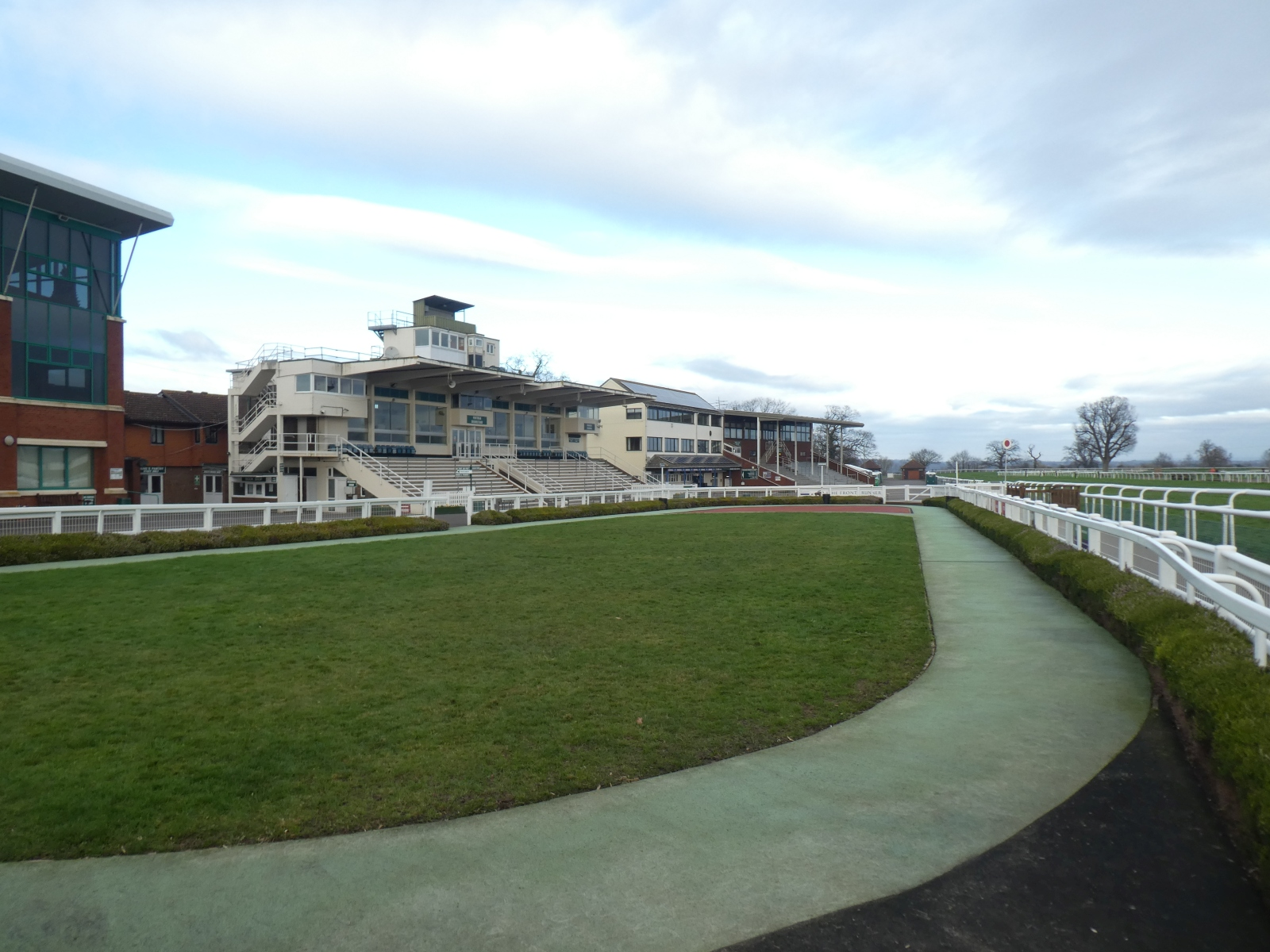
- The parade ring, in front of the stands
- Interactive map of Taunton
- Location: Taunton, Somerset
- Coordinates: 50°59′24″N 3°05′06″W
- Owned by: Taunton Racecourse Ltd
- Date opened: 21 September 1927
- Screened on: Racing TV
- Course type: National Hunt

Taunton Racecourse is a thoroughbred horse racing venue located in Orchard Portman, two miles south of Taunton, Somerset, England. Opened in 1927, Taunton was the last racecourse to be opened in Britain until Great Leighs in 2008.

== History ==
Horse racing has been taking place in the Taunton area since the 18th century, initially taking place in Broomhay, West Monkton, though these ceased in 1812 due in combination to the Napoleonic Wars and a lack of interest. Racing continued in Bridgwater, 11 miles (18 km) north, but recommenced in Taunton in 1825. The course was on the site now occupied by King's College, and was praised highly in the annual publication Sporting Magazine. Race meetings took place for two days at the beginning of September. The site was troubled by heavy rain in 1838, which washed out all the races, and two years later racing moved to Trull Moor, where they continued for a further 15 years. After this, the sport was once again confined to Bridgwater, and ceased even there at the outbreak of World War I.

In 1927, at a meeting held in London, the Taunton Racecourse Company was founded, and agreed to create a new course on land granted for the purpose by Viscount Portman. The site had housed Orchard Portman House, the seat of the Portman family, but the house was destroyed in 1840. A small church, which was part of the estate is still visible on the backstretch. The first meeting was held on 21 September 1927, and the first race, the "Shoreditch Selling Hurdle" was won by Baalbek, owned by Mr Rayson. Initially, spectators were housed in nothing more than a wooden stand, which was commonly surrounded by huge puddles of mud, but the ground has been heavily outgraded, and include the Orchard Stand and the Paddock Stand (which is the members enclosure) and the newer AP McCoy stand, which provide catering facilities and are used for meetings and conferences on days when racing is not taking place. The course was the last racecourse to be opened in Britain for 81 years, until Great Leighs hosted its first race in 2008, followed the subsequent year by Ffos Las.

== Course details ==
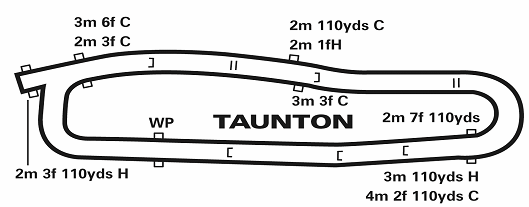
Course map

Taunton is a right-handed oval track, with two long straights and two tight bends. The course is 1 mile and 2 furlongs (2.01 km) in length, and has both fences and open ditches to negotiate. The course was improved during the building of the M5 motorway, with the removed earth being used to extend the back straight and the bends.

== Gallery ==
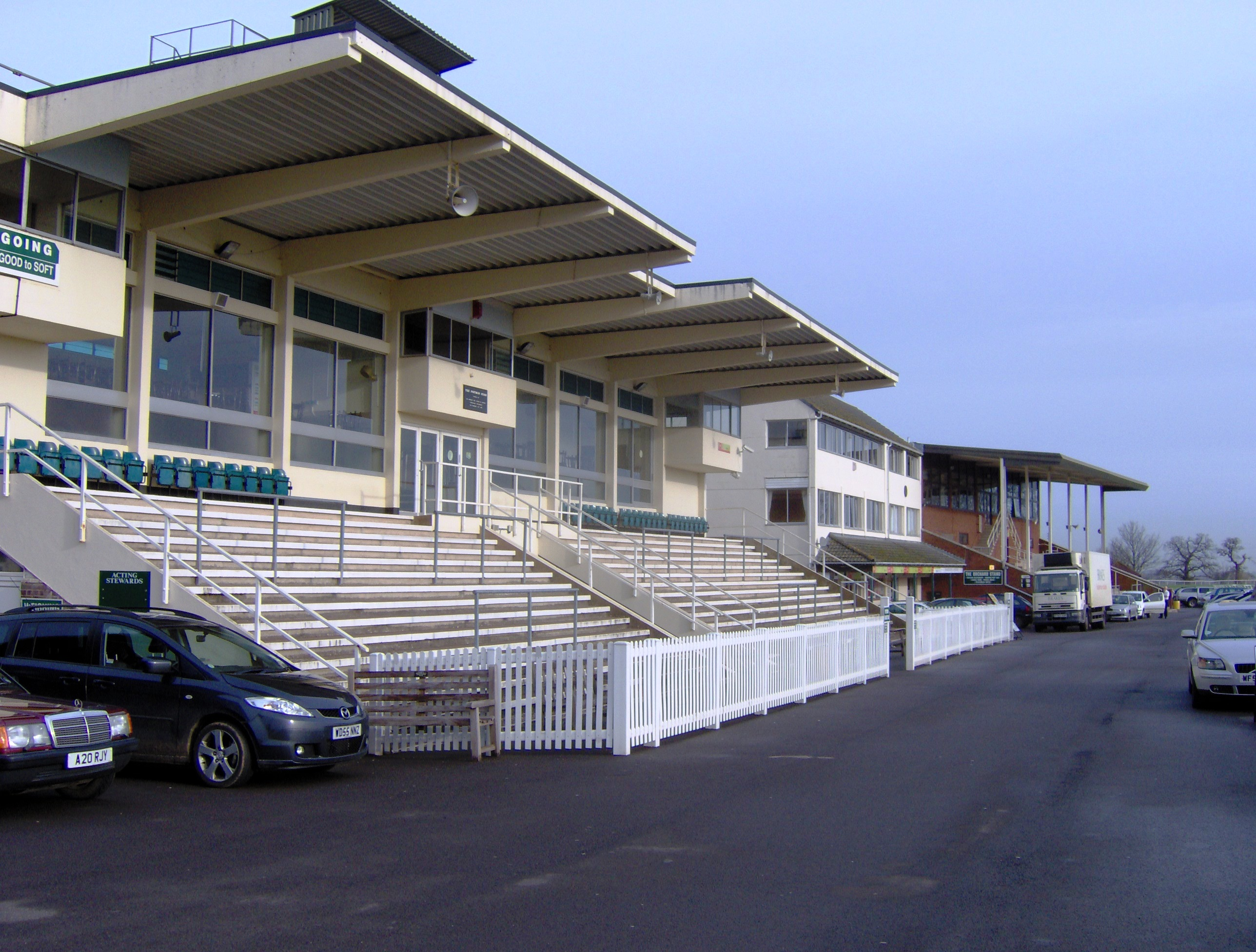
Orchard Stand

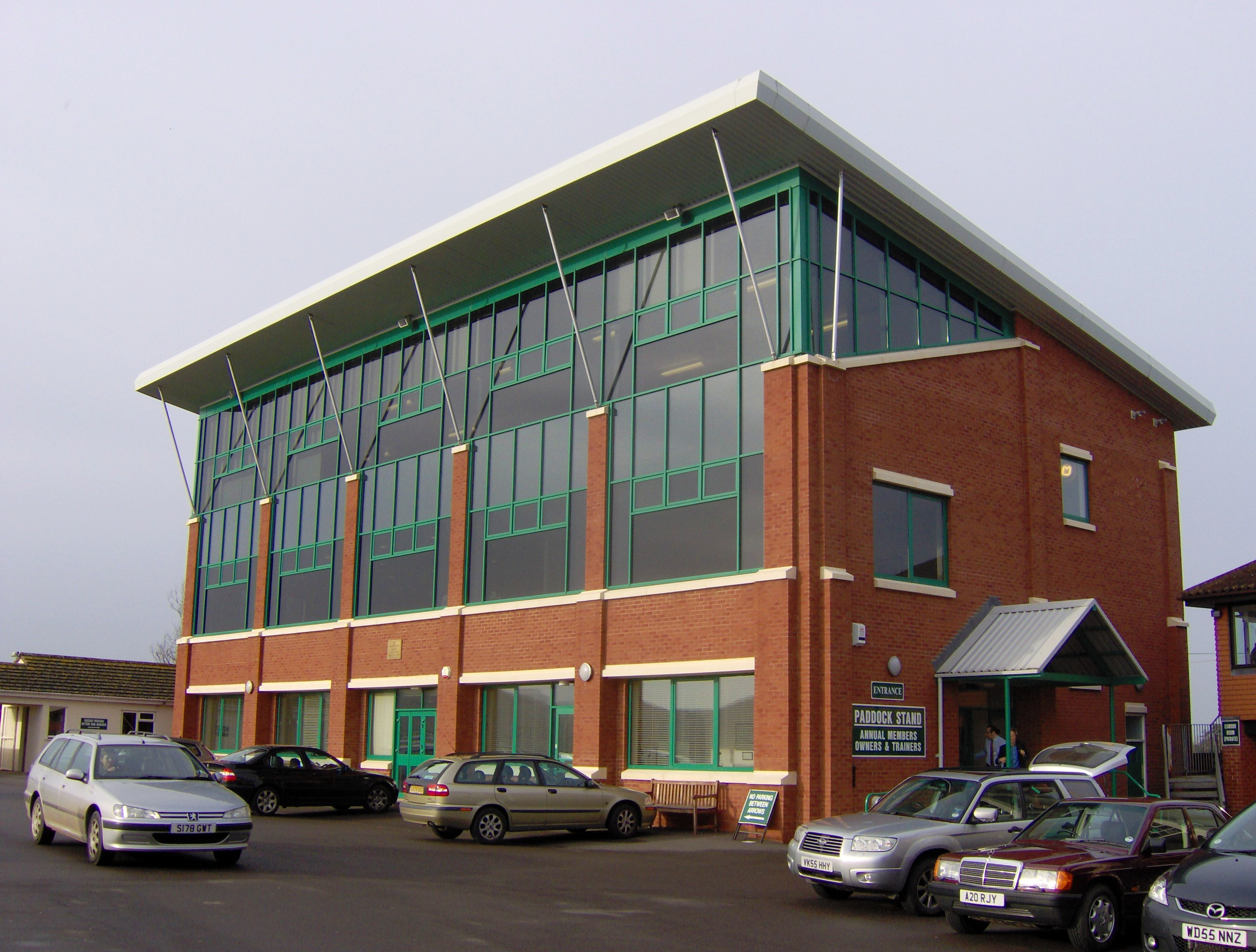
Paddock Stand

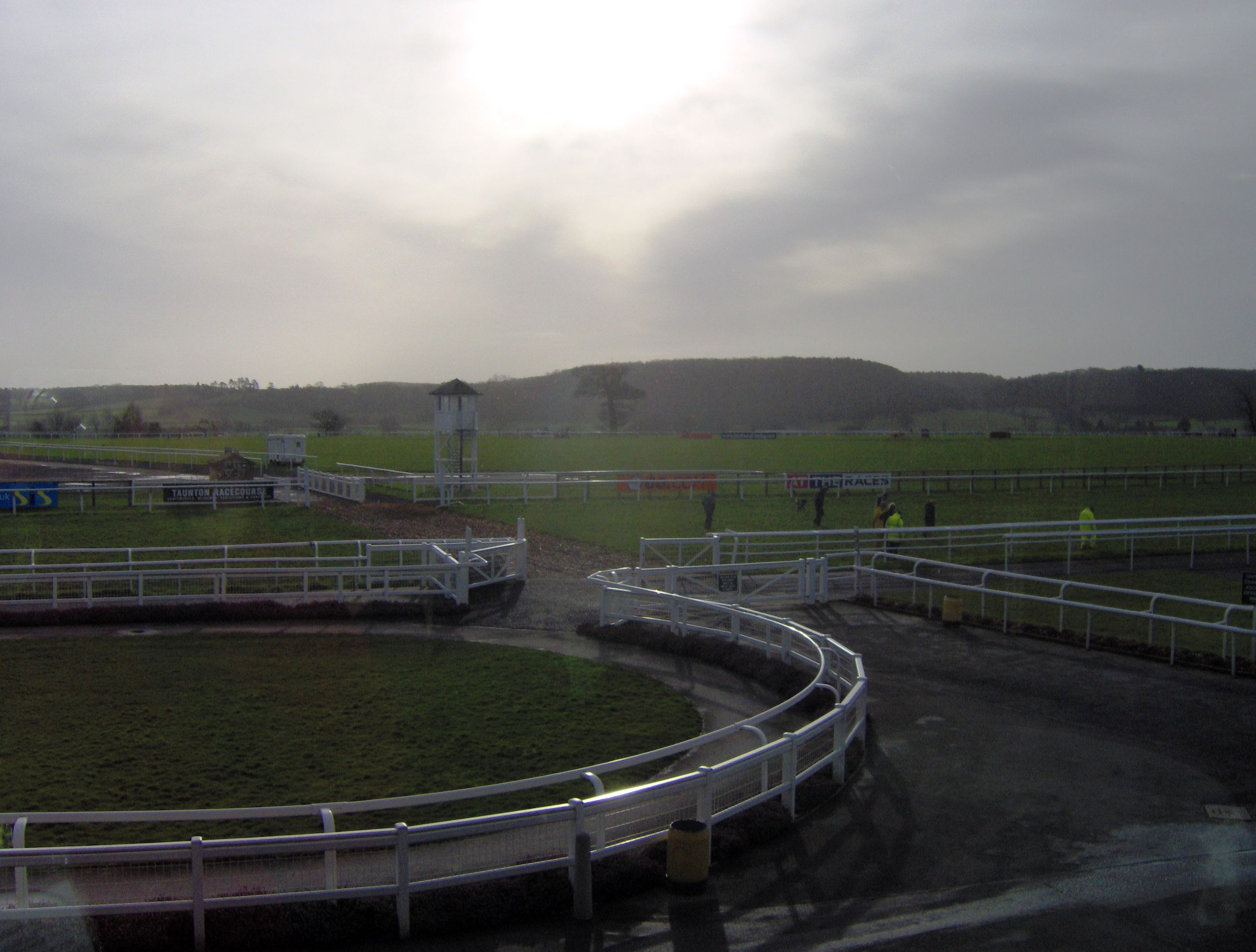
Looking towards the Blackdown Hills from the enclosures
