= Jamie Osborne (jockey) =

British jockey and racehorse trainer

Jamie Osborne (born James Anthony Osborne 28 August 1967) is a Lambourn-based racehorse trainer and former National Hunt jockey.

== Jockey ==
Osborne grew up in Yorkshire. His father Tony Osborne was a director of Market Rasen Racecourse and Osborne rode ponies from a young age. He rode for a couple of seasons as an amateur for stables in Yorkshire, his first winner being Fair Bavard for Harry Wharton at Southwell on 29 March 1986. In 1987 he moved south to Nicky Henderson's Lambourn stables and took out a professional licence.

In 1989, having completed two seasons as a professional jockey, Osborne was appointed stable jockey to Oliver Sherwood when the latter's brother Simon retired. The first major win for the partnership came with Arctic Call in the 1990 Hennessy Gold Cup at Newbury. In 1991 Osborne secured his first Grade 1 win when riding Change the Act in the Tolworth Novices' Hurdle at Sandown Park. In 1992 he was leading jockey at the Cheltenham Festival riding five winners, equalling a record at that time, with a treble on one day. The winners were Flown in the Supreme Novices' Hurdle, Young Pokey in the Arkle Challenge Trophy, Nomadic Way in the Stayers' Hurdle, Remittance Man in the Queen Mother Champion Chase, and Dusty Miller in the County Handicap Hurdle. Osborne went on to win the Arkle Challenge Trophy twice more in consecutive years, in 1993 (on Travado) and 1994 (on Nakir). At the 1997 festival there was another victory in the Stayers' Hurdle (on Karshi) and the Supreme Novices' Hurdle (on Shadow Leader). Osborne won the Henessy Gold Cup again in 1996 on Coome Hill. Major wins in Ireland included the 1996 Irish Champion Hurdle on Collier Bay and the 1995 Irish Grand National on Flashing Steel.

Osborne's most successful season was 1996-97 when he rode 131 winners and came second in the British jump racing Champion Jockey table, behind Tony McCoy. He also rode a winner on the flat in 1996. He wrote occasional columns for The Times newspaper.

In November 1997 Osborne rode 33/1 outsider Senor El Betrutti to victory in the Murphy's Gold Cup at Cheltenham and 24 hours later fractured his left wrist in a fall at the same racecourse. The injury would keep him out of racing for nearly a year.

Osborne injured his right wrist in a fall at the Cheltenham festival in March 1999. Later that month he announced his retirement from race riding and his intention to train on the flat. He was quoted as saying: "I haven't been enjoying the riding as much as I used to. There were lots of lows, I kept falling off, banging my head. I had just had enough of it. I've no regrets, but I will not miss going to Ludlow on a Thursday". Trainer Oliver Sherwood spoke of the end of their partnership: "Jamie was like another brother to me. He had a talent for communicating with owners and was a great stable jockey, but I am not surprised. He has had a basinful of falls". Falls were not the only hazard Osborne faced on the racecourse: in 1990 he was slapped in the face by trainer Jenny Pitman at Ayr on Scottish Grand National day and after a race at Newbury in 1992 he was headbutted by jockey Billy Morris and lost a tooth. Both Jenny Pitman and Billy Morris were fined £200.

== Trainer ==
Osborne took out a trainer's licence in 1999. Based at The Old Malthouse stables in Upper Lambourn, he trains mainly on the flat with occasional runners over jumps. His first Grade 1 success as a trainer came in October 2003 with Milk It Mick in the Dewhurst Stakes. Royal Ascot wins include the Windsor Castle Stakes with Drawnfromthepast in 2007, the Royal Hunt Cup in 2014 with Field of Dream and the Britannia Stakes in 2016 with Defrocked (later renamed Limitless). In terms of prize money, the yard's biggest winner was Toast of New York, who brought in nearly £2 million from his 13 international starts. He won the 2014 UAE Derby at Meydan Racecourse in Dubai and later that year came second in the Breeders' Cup Classic on the dirt track at Santa Anita Park, beaten by only a nose.

In 2002 Osborne was fined £4,000 by the Jockey Club for bringing racing into disrepute after he was caught on camera making unguarded remarks on the BBC Kenyon Confronts programme.

When racing was suspended due to the COVID-19 pandemic in the United Kingdom, Osborne filmed homemade musical productions in his yard which proved popular on Twitter.

In 2020, Osborne carried out the unlicensed felling of woodland. Upon being reported to West Berkshire Council, Osborne applied for retrospective planning permission after the illegitimate construction of a horse gallop was found. In response to the illegal deforestation, the Forestry Commission served a restocking notice. The retrospective application was approved (subject to certain mitigating conditions) despite the recommendation of refusal from the Western Area Planning Committee.

== Personal life ==
Osborne is married to artist Katie O'Sullivan. Daughter Saffie Osborne is a jockey. In June 2021 Osborne contacted police after his daughter was the subject of threats on social media; this led to a wider debate about online abuse of racing participants.
