= Martin Pipe =

British horse trainer

Martin Pipe CBE
Personal information
- Born: 29 May 1945 (age 81) Somerset, England
- Occupation: Racehorse trainer
- Relative: David Pipe

Martin Charles Pipe CBE (born 29 May 1945), is an English former racehorse trainer credited with professionalising the British racehorse training industry, and until 2026 the most successful trainer in British jump racing.

The son of a West Country bookmaker, Pipe was an amateur jockey before turning his attention to training in 1974 at Nicholashayne, Somerset, near Wellington, England, at Pond House stables.

Pipe is broadly credited with professionalising National Hunt racing. He made multiple simple but effective changes to what had been then the traditional methods of training racehorses, specifically those in jump racing. His training innovations included using interval training, using daily blood tests to assess fitness, and keeping horses lean during the racing season, all intended to ensure his horses were at peak fitness for races. His methods came into broad use during the period he was training.

Pipe was appointed a Commander of the Order of the British Empire (CBE) in the 2000 New Year Honours for services to horse racing. He retired in 2006. His son, David Pipe, took over as trainer with Pipe assisting.

== Early life and education ==
Pipe was born to Dave and Betty Pipe; his father was a bookmaker who owned or managed 45 betting shops. He attended Queen's College in Taunton. He left school with three O-levels.

After he left school Pipe worked in his father's shops, managing some of them, and also worked as an amateur jockey in point-to-point races. He wanted to become a professional jockey, but didn't have great success and turned to training. He first sat on a horse at the age of seventeen and rode only one winner. His father had built a stables for some point-to-pointers he owned, and after an injury following his single amateur win, Pipe decided he would train his father's point-to-pointers. Prior to this he had never considered training as a career and knew nothing about training racehorses.

== Career ==
Pipe applied for and received a licence to train in 1974 and began training at his father's farm, Pond House stables, which Dave Pipe had converted from a dilapidated former pig farm to establish racing stables. Pond House is located in the hamlet of Nicholashayne in Somerset, near Wellington and the Devon border. He hired Chester Barnes, a former table tennis champion, as his assistant. Pipe knew nothing about training racehorses, and his initial efforts were conspicuously unsuccessful.

Pipe's first winner was with Hit Parade in a selling hurdle at Taunton in May 1975, jockeyed by Len Lungo. Before the race, Pipe's bookmaker father announced “I intend to lay the horse to any punters who want to back it with me. Mark my words, Martin will never train a winner.” After Hit Parade won, Pipe's father told him "You never trained that horse. [Previous trainer] Gay Kindersley gets that winner." Fourteen seasons later Pipe was crowned champion trainer for the first time.

The first clue to the upward trajectory that his career would subsequently take came with the 66/1 victory of Baron Blakeney over red-hot favourite Broadsword in the 1981 Triumph Hurdle at Cheltenham.

Teaching himself the job with no preconceived notions or received wisdom, Pipe changed his training methods, which started out following what was typical at the time, and when he started winning races others became suspicious of his methods. ITV did an edition of The Cook Report in 1991 that according to the Racing Post "basically accused Pipe of every dodgy practice short of witchcraft" and according to The Guardian in 2006 was "a very spiteful programme without foundation". The Times, writing in 2020, called it a "savaging" and said of the insinuations of ethical violations and cruelty, "The truth, though, was that Pipe was just getting his horses fitter than anyone else, knew precisely when they were healthy enough to do themselves justice, and ran them in the right races." Pipe was so upset he had thoughts of suicide; he recalls being brought out of his despondency by the public offer a few days later from Percy Brown, a Jockey Club steward, to send Pipe a horse for training. In 2002, suspicions raised again by his successes, the Jockey Club made a "dramatic dawn raid" on Pond House and collected blood samples, all of which tested negative. The Independent, writing at the time of Pipe's retirement in 2006, called the various accusations and investigations a "shameful persecution".

== Highlights ==
Pipe went on to be Champion Trainer 15 times with successive stable jockeys Len Lungo, Peter Scudamore, Richard Dunwoody, David Bridgwater and Tony McCoy. He also employed as jockeys Gordon Elliott, who later went on to become a notable trainer, and Scudamore's son, Tom Scudamore. Peter Scudamore, McCoy and Dunwoody all won Champion Jockey while working with Pipe. Pipe and Dunwoody had a difficult relationship.

Pipe's partnership with jockey Scudamore from 1986 through 1993 (when Scudamore retired) was particularly successful; the Racing Post wrote:"Many trainers have copied the methods of Martin Pipe in recent decades and several jockeys have superseded the numerical achievements of Peter Scudamore, but none can claim to have cut such a swathe through racing’s centuries-old idyll as the pair who arrived like an act of God in the closing years of the 1980s."

Pipe also employed assistants who went on to become notable trainers themselves, including Tom Dascombe and Venetia Williams.

Pipe was also associated with multiple notable racehorse owners, including David Johnson, Paul Green, Freddie Starr, Terry Neill, Brian Kilpatrick, Darren Mercer, John Brown, and Stanley Clarke.

Notable horses Pipe trained include Carvill's Hill, Deano's Beeno, Cyfor Malta, Rushing Wild, Gloria Victis, Pridwell, Tiutchev, Beau Ranger, Granville Again, Make A Stand, Challenger du Luc, Lady Cricket, Balasani, Cyborgo, Miinehoma, Bonanza Boy, Run For Free, Riverside Boy, Take Control, Tiutchev, Omerta, Well Chief, Cyborgo, Horsa La Loi III, Puntal, and Viking Flagship.

Pipe was a "dominant force" as a trainer for runners in the Welsh Grand National from the late 80s into the early 90s. In 1991 Carvill's Hill, owned by Paul Green and under Scudamore, "demolished" the National, carrying top weight and finishing 20 lengths ahead going away in soft, heavy going. (See external link below.) It was Carvill's Hill's career-best performance and the best performance in the race's history, according to Timeform. In addition to the Carvill's Hill win, Pipe won the Welsh Grand National with Bonanza Boy in 1988 and 1989, Run For Free in 1992, and Riverside Boy in 1993.

In 1998 the Pipe-trained and McCoy-ridden Unsinkable Boxer won the Pertemps Handicap Hurdle at the Cheltenham Festival and for years the win was described as "one of the biggest handicap hits at Cheltenham" and as late as 2021 as "one of the biggest handicap gambles landed".

On eight occasions Pipe trained over 200 winners in one season, with a record tally of 243 in 1999–2000 and an amazing lifetime tally of 4183 European winners. He saddled a total of 34 winners at the Cheltenham Festival, including two Champion Hurdles with Granville Again in 1993 and novice Make A Stand in 1997, though victory in the Cheltenham Gold Cup eluded him (Rushing Wild came second in 1993). He also won the 1994 Grand National with Miinnehoma for owner Freddie Starr.

Success was not confined to National Hunt racing, with 256 victories on the Flat, including six at Royal Ascot.

Pipe announced his retirement on grounds of ill-health on 29 April 2006, handing over the reins to son, David Pipe.

As of 2019 Pipe is involved in racing as an owner and an assistant to his son. His horse Gaspara was trained by his son David to win the 2007 Imperial Cup and Fred Winter Hurdle. Winning both of these races gained Martin Pipe a £75,000 bonus. In 2009 Pipe was honoured with the creation of a new race at the Cheltenham Festival named after him, the Martin Pipe Conditional Jockeys' Handicap Hurdle.

== Methods ==
Pipe is described by the Racing Post as having "revolutionised" how racehorses are trained. He made a series of simple changes, which he described as "common sense", in training methods which he reasoned would help the horses he was training reach peak fitness, on the theory that if his horses were more fit than their competitors, they'd win more often than expected on past form.

Prior to his work, racehorses were typically trained with long gallops, and training was, according to The Times, "a gentlemanly, often amateurish, pursuit". Pipe worked his horses with interval training up short, steep gallops, which improved their fitness more effectively. After a veterinarian told him the results of a recent blood test meant the horse wasn't fit – and the horse lost its next race – Pipe set up a laboratory in his stables to allow for consistency and faster results. While other trainers fed richer diets, he weighed his horses regularly and kept them leaner during racing seasons, reasoning that "you don't see fat athletes". If a horse's regular exercise rider was lighter than the horse would be expected to carry in a race, he added saddle weights during training gallops. Eventually he started using treadmills and put in an equine swimming pool. His methods were widely adopted.

Pipe kept meticulous records of his methods, of data such as blood test results, gallops times, horses' weights and twice-daily body temperatures, and of racing outcomes; he attributed his record-keeping habit to his training in bookmaking in his father's shops, and all of which were unusual at the time.

== Legacy ==
The Racing Post called him "one of the greatest trainers ever", his stables, Pond House, "legendary", and in 2023 said he had "revolutionised a profession he entered without experience, then conquered. Pipe changed everything". Pipe's methods came into wide use and became industry standards throughout the racing world. By 1992, according to The Independent, he had "redefined the preparation of racehorses". In 2005 the Guardian called him "the man who changed jump racing for good" and in 2006, after his retirement, "the most successful trainer in the history of jump racing". In 2020, The Times credited him with professionalising National Hunt Racing and called his training methods the "blueprint that others now aspire to". As of 2021 he was still the most successful jump trainer in British history.

== Personal life ==
Pipe married Carol Tyson, whom he met while they were both working in the Pipe family's bookmaking business, in 1971. The couple had one child, David Pipe, who took over the training facilities on Pipe's retirement in 2006 due to health concerns involving a muscle-wasting disease that was causing him mobility issues. Martin Pipe's father died in 2002. Pipe was appointed a CBE in 2000 for services to racing.
