= Paisley Park (horse) =

Irish-bred Thoroughbred racehorse

- Sire: Oscar
- Grandsire: Sadler's Wells
- Dam: Presenting Shares
- Damsire: Presenting
- Sex: Gelding
- Foaled: 11 May 2012
- Country: Ireland
- Colour: Bay
- Breeder: Michael Conaghan
- Owner: Andrew Gemmell
- Trainer: Emma Lavelle
- Record: 21: 10-4-4
- Earnings: £570,385

Major wins
- Betfair Stayers' Handicap Hurdle (2018); Long Walk Hurdle (2018, 2020, 2022); Cleeve Hurdle (2019, 2020, 2022); Stayers' Hurdle (2019); Long Distance Hurdle (2019)

Paisley Park (foaled 11 March 2012) is an Irish-bred, British-trained racehorse. He showed promise when finishing second in a National Hunt Flat race on his debut but nearly died when he contracted colic shortly afterwards. He won one race as a novice hurdler in the 2017/18 National Hunt season and established himself as an outstanding stayer in the following season when he won the Betfair Stayers' Handicap Hurdle, Long Walk Hurdle, Cleeve Hurdle and Stayers' Hurdle. In the 2019/20 National Hunt season he won the Long Distance Hurdle and a second Cleeve Hurdle. In his next campaign he took the Long Walk Hurdle again and ran third in the Stayers' Hurdle.

== Background ==
Paisley Park is a bay horse with a narrow white stripe bred by Michael Conaghan at Evergreen Stud in County Kildare. As a yearling he was offered for sale at Tattersalls Ireland in November 2012 and was bought for €12,500 by Richard E Rohan. He had been gelded before he returned to the sales ring at Goffs in June 2015 when he was sold to Gerry Hogan Bloodstock for €60,000. He entered the ownership of Andrew Gemmell and was sent into training with Emma Lavelle at the Bonita Stable at Ogbourne Maizey in Wiltshire. Gemmell, who has been blind since birth, named the horse in honour of Prince's Paisley Park residence.

He was sired by Oscar, a horse who finished second to Peintre Celebre in the Prix du Jockey Club before becoming a leading sire of National Hunt horses. His other major winners have included Lord Windermere, Rock On Ruby, Oscar Whisky and Big Zeb. Paisley Park's dam Presenting Shares was an unraced daughter of the leading National Hunt stallion Presenting. She was a female descendant of the British broodmare Salecraft, a half-sister to Straight Deal.

== Racing career ==
=== 2016/17 National Hunt season ===
Paisley Park made his racecourse debut in a National Hunt Flat race over two miles on soft ground at Warwick Racecourse on 14 January 2017 when he started at odds of 6/1 and finished second, beaten a length by the winner Point of Principle. The horse then missed the rest of the season after suffering a life-threatening bout of horse colic.

=== 2017/18 National Hunt season ===
In the 2017/18 National Hunt season Paisley Park was campaigned in Novice Hurdle races and was ridden by Nick Scholfield in all four of his starts. On his return to the track after an eleven month absence the gelding contested a minor event over two and a half miles at Hereford Racecourse on 16 December and he recorded his first success as he jumped into the lead at the final hurdle and won by seven lengths from the 1/4 favourite Vision Des Flos. Paisley Park ran second in his next two starts, beaten a length by Mr Whipped at Warwick in January and one and a quarter lengths by Gowitheflow at Doncaster Racecourse in the following month. In March he was stepped up in class and distance for the Grade 1 Spa Novices' Hurdle over three miles at Cheltenham Racecourse in which he started a 33/1 outsider and came home last of the thirteen finishers behind Kilbricken Storm after losing a shoe.

=== 2018/19 National Hunt season ===
Aidan Coleman took over from Scholfield as Paisley Park's regular jockey for the 2018/19 National Hunt season. The gelding began his campaign in a handicap at Aintree Racecourse on 28 October and won by two and a half lengths from Lygon Rock after taking the lead on the extended run-in. On 24 November at Haydock Park he started at odds of 4/1 for the Grade 3 Betfair Stayers' Handicap Hurdle over three miles. Carrying 166 pounds he was restrained by Coleman in the early stages before producing a strong late run to take the lead near the finish and won by half a length from Shades Of Midnight. The Grade 1 Long Walk Hurdle over three miles at Ascot Racecourse on 22 December saw Paisley Park go off at odds of 8/1 in an eleven runner field which also included Call Me Lord (winner of the Bet365 Select Hurdle and the 7/2 favourite), Unowhatimeanharry (Champion Stayers Hurdle), Sam Spinner (winner of the race in 2017), Agrapart (Cleeve Hurdle) and Top Notch (Scilly Isles Novices' Chase). After racing towards the rear of the field he made steady progress in the last half mile, overtook West Approach on the run-in and won by two lengths. Coleman, who was winning his first race at Grade 1 level, said "It's taken me too long, but it meant a lot to do it now. He's a star, he has a lovely way of riding. He's just a proper good horse."

On 22 January at Cheltenham, Paisley Park started 100/30 favourite for the Grade 2 Cleeve Hurdle, with the better-fancied of his eleven opponents being Black Op (Mersey Novices' Hurdle), Aux Ptits Soins (Coral Cup), Midnight Shadow (Scottish Champion Hurdle) and Wholestone (Relkeel Hurdle). After racing in mid-division he moved up to take the lead approaching the final obstacle and drew away to win by twelve lengths in "impressive" style. Andrew Gemmell quoted Prince saying "Let's go crazy! It is extraordinary. I was hopeful but you never know, as his one bad run was at Cheltenham last season. He was at death's door and it is a remarkable recovery and I'm just really chuffed."

At Cheltenham on 14 March Paisley Park started 11/8 favourite in an eighteen-runner field for the Grade 1 Stayers' Hurdle. His old rivals Top Notch, Kilbricken Storm, Black Op, West Approach, Sam Spinner and Wholestone were again in opposition, while the other contenders included Faugheen, Petit Mouchoir (Irish Champion Hurdle), Supasundae (Punchestown Champion Hurdle), Bapaume (Prix la Barka), Bacardys (Champion Novice Hurdle) and Yanworth (Liverpool Hurdle). He settled well behind the front-runners before overtaking the leader Sam Spinner after the penultimate obstacle. He made a jumping error at the last flight but recovered and stayed on well to win by two and a three quarter lengths from Sam Spinner, with a further four lengths back to Faugheen in third. After the race Emma Lavelle said "He's delivered for us the whole season and he's done it again. I'm thrilled. He was a bit further back than I expected, but the man in charge [Coleman] knew what he was doing. There are so many people behind this horse and I think they just blew him up the hill. We're going to enjoy the moment. I can't say quite how bad our hangover is going to be in the morning!"

=== 2019/20 National Hunt season ===
Paisley Park began his next campaign in the Grade 2 Long Distance Hurdle at Newbury Racecourse on 29 November and started the 8/15 favourite against four opponents namely Thistlecrack, Unowhatimeanharry, The World's End (Sefton Novices' Hurdle) and Beer Goggles. He raced from off the pace as usual before taking the lead at the last and stayed on well to win by a length from Thistlecrack, to whom he was conceding six pounds in weight. Lavelle commented "He won well in the end and the buzz is unbelievable. To train a horse like this is a massive privilege and a responsibility as well".

At Cheltenham on 15 January Paisley Park attempt to repeat his 2019 success in the Cleeve Hurdle and started the 4/6 favourite against seven opponents headed by If The Cap Fits (winner of the Liverpool Hurdle and Ascot Hurdle). He overtook the front-running Summerville Boy at the last and won "comfortably" by one and a quarter lengths. Lavelle said "He's getting better. I think I love him. He's not a slow horse. He's a stayer but he's got pace. I enjoyed that. You just feel that, if something comes to him, it's gonna make him go quicker."

On 12 March Paisley Park went off at odds of 4/6 as he made his bid to win a second Stayers' Hurdle at Cheltenham. He raced from off the pace as usual but was never able to get into serious contention and came home seventh behind the 50/1 outsider Lisnagar Oscar. Lavelle was unable to account for the poor run but stated that the gelding had lost two shoes in the race.

=== 2020/21 National Hunt season ===
On his first appearance of the 2020/21 National Hunt season Paisley Park contested the Long Distance Hurdle at Newbury but was unable to repeat his 2019 success as he was beaten one and a half lengths into second place by the six-year-old Thyme Hill to whom he was conceding three pounds in weight. On 19 December Paisley Park faced a rematch with Thyme Hill in the Long Walk Hurdle at Ascot, this time at level weights. He started second favourite behind his younger rival in an eight-runner field which also included Roksana (David Nicholson Mares' Hurdle), Main Fact (Stayers' Handicap Hurdle) and The World's End. After being restrained at the rear of the field he made steady progress from the fourth last and stayed on strongly to catch Thyme Hill in the final strides and won by a neck. Aidan Coleman commented "It wasn't until we got towards the last that he really put the afterburners on. It was a sense of relief and he would have been a unlucky loser. It's a long way up the run-in and his stamina came into play at the end, which goes to show how genuine and tough he is that he can get pushed out into an unpromising position and still win. That's what good horses do though. He's the ultimate stayer".

Paisley Park ran in his third Stayers' Hurdle at Cheltenham on 18 March and went off the 9/4 favourite in a fifteen-runner field. He raced towards the rear of the field for most of the way before producing his customary strong finish but never looked likely to win and came home third behind the front-running Flooring Porter.

== Pedigree ==
Pedigree of Paisley Park, bay gelding, 2012
Sire Oscar (IRE) 1994	Sadler's Wells (USA); 1981	Northern Dancer (CAN)	Nearctic
Sire Oscar (IRE) 1994	Sadler's Wells (USA); 1981	Northern Dancer (CAN)	Natalma (USA)
Sire Oscar (IRE) 1994	Sadler's Wells (USA); 1981	Fairy Bridge	Bold Reason
Sire Oscar (IRE) 1994	Sadler's Wells (USA); 1981	Fairy Bridge	Special
Sire Oscar (IRE) 1994	Snow Day (FR); 1978	Reliance	Tantieme
Sire Oscar (IRE) 1994	Snow Day (FR); 1978	Reliance	Relance
Sire Oscar (IRE) 1994	Snow Day (FR); 1978	Vindaria (USA)	Roi Dagobert (FR)
Sire Oscar (IRE) 1994	Snow Day (FR); 1978	Vindaria (USA)	Heavenly Body
Dam Presenting Shares (IRE) 1999	Presenting (GB); 1982	Mtoto	Busted
Dam Presenting Shares (IRE) 1999	Presenting (GB); 1982	Mtoto	Amazer (FR)
Dam Presenting Shares (IRE) 1999	Presenting (GB); 1982	D'Azy (IRE)	Persian Bold
Dam Presenting Shares (IRE) 1999	Presenting (GB); 1982	D'Azy (IRE)	Belle Viking (IRE)
Dam Presenting Shares (IRE) 1999	Royal Shares (IRE); 1994	Royal Fountain (GB)	Royalty
Dam Presenting Shares (IRE) 1999	Royal Shares (IRE); 1994	Royal Fountain (GB)	Fountain
Dam Presenting Shares (IRE) 1999	Royal Shares (IRE); 1994	Four Shares	The Parson (GB)
Dam Presenting Shares (IRE) 1999	Royal Shares (IRE); 1994	Four Shares	Bright Record (GB) (Family: 1-t)
