= Lisnagar Oscar =

Irish-bred Thoroughbred racehorse

- Sire: Oscar
- Grandsire: Sadler's Wells
- Dam: Asta Belle
- Damsire: Astarabad
- Sex: Gelding
- Foaled: 9 May 2013
- Country: Ireland
- Colour: Bay
- Breeder: Denis Fitzgerald
- Owner: Racing For Fun
- Trainer: Rebecca Curtis
- Record: 17: 3-4-4
- Earnings: £245,027

Major wins
- Prestige Novices' Hurdle (2019); Stayers' Hurdle (2020)

Lisnagar Oscar (foaled 9 May 2013) is an Irish-bred, British-trained racehorse best known for his achievements in National Hunt racing. He won his only Point-to-point race and then showed very promising form as a Novice hurdler in the 2018/19 National Hunt season, winning the Prestige Novices' Hurdle and being placed in both the Prestige Novices' Hurdle and the Sefton Novices' Hurdle. In the following season he raced unsuccessfully in Steeplechases before returning to smaller obstacles and recording his biggest win in the Stayers' Hurdle. He failed to win in his first four start of the 2020/21 season, when he underwent surgery to correct his breathing.

== Background ==
Lisnagar Oscar is a bay horse with a small white star bred in Ireland by Denis Fitzgerald who named the horse after his residence at Lisnagar near Fermoy in County Cork. The horse was gelded before the start of his racing career.

He was sired by Oscar, a horse who finished second to Peintre Celebre in the Prix du Jockey Club before becoming a leading sire of National Hunt horses. His other major winners have included Lord Windermere, Rock On Ruby, Oscar Whisky Paisley Park and Big Zeb. Lisnagar Oscar's dam Asta Belle was an unraced daughter of the Prix Ganay winner Astarabad. She was a full-sister to Whisper, a two-time winner of the Liverpool Hurdle. Asta Belle was a female-line descendant of the British broodmare Sunny Belle, a half-sister to the dam of Windsor Lad.

== Racing career ==
=== 2017/18 Point-to-point season ===
Lisnagar Oscar began his career on the amateur Point-to-point circuit. On 25 March 2018 he started 9/4 favourite for a three-mile maiden hurdle on soft to heavy ground at Liscarroll and won by eight lengths.

On 12 April he was consigned to the Goffs UK Aintree Sale where he was not auctioned but was bought privately for £105,000 by the trainer Rebecca Curtis. The horse was taken into training by Curtis at Newport, Pembrokeshire and entered the ownership of the Racing For Fun syndicate.

=== 2018/19 National Hunt season ===
On his first appearance under National Hunt rules, Lisnagar Oscar finished third to the Paul Nicholls-trained McFabulous in a National Hunt Flat race over two miles at Chepstow Racecourse on 14 October. For the rest of the season the gelding was campaigned in Novice hurdle races. He ran second in a minor event at Ffos Las Racecourse in November and was then stepped up in class for the Grade 2 Bristol Novices' Hurdle at Cheltenham Racecourse in December and finished second again, beaten two and three quarter lengths by Rockpoint. On 18 January Lisnagar Oscar started favourite for a minor event at Chepstow in which he was ridden by Sean Bowen and recorded his first success under rules as he took the lead at the second last obstacle and held off the challenge of Dickie Diver to prevail by a head. Bowen was again in the saddle when the gelding started at odds of 6/1 for the Grade 2 Prestige Novices' Hurdle over three miles at Haydock Park on 16 February. After tracking the front-running Ask Ben, Lisnagar Oscar gained the advantage at the penultimate flight of hurdles and drew away to win by ten lengths despite being eased down in the closing stages.

For his last two races of the season Lisnagar Oscar moved up to the highest class to compete in Grade 1 events and acquitted himself well despite failing to win. At the Cheltenham Festival in March he finished fifth to the 50/1 outsider Minella Indo in the Spa Novices' Hurdle and in the following month he came home third behind Champ and Emitom in the Sefton Novices' Hurdle at Aintree Racecourse.

=== 2019/20 National Hunt season ===
Lisnagar Oscar began the 2019/20 National Hunt season by competing in novice chases. He made his debut over the bigger obstacles at Chepstow on 11 October when he started favourite but was beaten a neck Ardlethen after failing to recover from a mistake at the final fence. The gelding went off the 4/6 favourite at Stratford Racecourse three weeks later but after tracking the front-running winner Black Op he made a jumping error at the third last and then faded badly to come home third, beaten more than thirty-three lengths. At Haydock in November he reverted to hurdles but was never in contention as he finished ninth of the thirteen finishers behind Stoney Mountain in the Betfair Stayers' Handicap Hurdle. The new year saw no improvement as he fell at the second flight of a handicap hurdle at Warwick Racecourse on 11 January. Two weeks later he started a 50/1 outsider for the Grade 2 Cleeve Hurdle at Cheltenham and produced a much improved performance to take third place behind Paisley Park and Summerville Boy.

At Cheltenham on 12 March, ridden as on his previous start by Adam Wedge, Lisnagar Oscar started a 50/1 outsider in a fifteen-runner field for the Stayers' Hurdle. Paisley Park started favourite while the other contenders included Apple's Jade, Penhill, Summerville Boy, Emitom (Rendlesham Hurdle), City Island (Baring Bingham Novices' Hurdle), L'Ami Serge (Aintree Hurdle) and Bacardys (Champion Novice Hurdle). He raced in mid-division before moving up to overtake the front-running Apple's Jade between the last two hurdles. He stayed on well up the run in and prevailed by two lengths from Ronald Pump, with three lengths back to Bacardys in third. After the race Rebecca Curtis said "It's a shock he's won. I didn't think he'd beat Paisley Park, but I was hoping we'd have a good run here after the last time. It was like he'd just got his confidence back the last time. I'm just speechless... I thought he'd make a lovely chaser, but he didn't take to fences. He's quite small and is quick and neat over his hurdles. We tried fences early in the season. It all went wrong. Whether that put him off racing for a bit, I don't know. Something just wasn't quite right with him... He just sprung to form six weeks ago and we fancied him to run well today."

=== 2020/21 National Hunt season ===
At Wetherby Racecourse on 31 October Lisnagar Oscar made his first appearance since this Stayers' Hurdle win, Lisnagar Oscar carried top weight of 160 pounds in the Grade 2 West Yorkshire Hurdle in which he took the lead approaching the second last before fading in the closing stages and finishing fourth behind the mare Roksana. In the Long Distance Hurdle at Newbury in November he went to the front at the third last hurdle but as at Wetherby, he tired badly and came home seventh of the ten runners behind Thyme Hill, beaten more than twenty lengths by the winner. After the race the gelding underwent surgery to correct a breathing problem.

In the Rendlesham Hurdle at Haydock in January Lisnagar Oscar produced a better effort, taking the lead at the eighth flight and then rallying after being overtaken by Third Wind at the last to finish second by three quarters of a length. At Cheltenham on 18 March the gelding attempted to repeat his 2020 victory in the Stayers' Hurdle and started at odds of 11/1 in a fifteen-runner field. Ridden by Harry Skelton he appeared to be going well when he fell "heavily" at the seventh hurdle.

== Pedigree ==
Pedigree of Lisnagar Oscar, bay gelding, 2013
Sire Oscar (IRE) 1994	Sadler's Wells (USA); 1981	Northern Dancer (CAN)	Nearctic
Sire Oscar (IRE) 1994	Sadler's Wells (USA); 1981	Northern Dancer (CAN)	Natalma (USA)
Sire Oscar (IRE) 1994	Sadler's Wells (USA); 1981	Fairy Bridge	Bold Reason
Sire Oscar (IRE) 1994	Sadler's Wells (USA); 1981	Fairy Bridge	Special
Sire Oscar (IRE) 1994	Snow Day (FR); 1978	Reliance	Tantieme
Sire Oscar (IRE) 1994	Snow Day (FR); 1978	Reliance	Relance
Sire Oscar (IRE) 1994	Snow Day (FR); 1978	Vindaria (USA)	Roi Dagobert (FR)
Sire Oscar (IRE) 1994	Snow Day (FR); 1978	Vindaria (USA)	Heavenly Body
Dam Asta Belle (FR) 2003	Astarabad (USA); 1994	Alleged	Hoist The Flag
Dam Asta Belle (FR) 2003	Astarabad (USA); 1994	Alleged	Princess Pout
Dam Asta Belle (FR) 2003	Astarabad (USA); 1994	Anaza (IRE)	Darshaan (GB)
Dam Asta Belle (FR) 2003	Astarabad (USA); 1994	Anaza (IRE)	Azaarika
Dam Asta Belle (FR) 2003	Bella Yepa (FR); 1996	Mansonnien	Tip Moss
Dam Asta Belle (FR) 2003	Bella Yepa (FR); 1996	Mansonnien	Association
Dam Asta Belle (FR) 2003	Bella Yepa (FR); 1996	Grande Yepa	Yelapa
Dam Asta Belle (FR) 2003	Bella Yepa (FR); 1996	Grande Yepa	Grande Marque (Family: 19-b)
