= Flooring Porter =

Irish-bred Thoroughbred racehorse

- Sire: Yeats
- Grandsire: Sadler's Wells
- Dam: Lillymile
- Damsire: Revoque
- Sex: Gelding
- Foaled: 12 May 2015
- Country: Ireland
- Colour: Bay
- Breeder: Sean Murphy
- Owner: Flooring Porter Syndicate
- Trainer: Gavin Cromwell
- Record: 15: 6-2-1
- Earnings: £262,259

Major wins
- Christmas Hurdle (2020); Stayers' Hurdle (2021, 2022); Kerry National (2024)

Flooring Porter (foaled 12 May 2015) is an Irish racehorse best known for his achievements in National Hunt racing. He was highly tried in his first season as a Novice hurdler, running nine times and winning two minor races. In the following season he made dramatic improvement, winning two Handicap hurdles before stepping up to Grade 1 class to win the Christmas Hurdle and the Stayers' Hurdle.

== Background ==
Flooring Porter is a bay with no white markings horse bred in Ireland by Sean Murphy who is based at the Ryehill Stables in County Galway. Murphy had also bred the horse's dam and grand-dam. As a foal in December 2015 the colt was consigned to the Goffs National Hunt sale and was bought for €6,000 by Richard Rohan. The horse was gelded before returning to the Goffs sales ring in June when he was not sold after failing to reach his reserve price. He entered the ownership of the Flooring Porter Syndicate and was taken into training by Gavin Cromwell at Navan in County Meath.

He was sired by Yeats, an outstanding flat stayer who won a record four editions of the Ascot Gold Cup. Flooring Porter's dam Lillymile showed modest racing ability, winning two hurdle races from fourteen starts under National Hunt rules. She was descended from the British broodmare Fair Terms who was the female-line ancestor of Narita Brian and Lochsong.

== Racing career ==
=== 2019/20 National Hunt season ===
Flooring Porter began his career in the summer of 2019 when he was initially campaigned in Novice hurdle races. On his debut he started at odds of 25/1 at Cork Racecourse on 12 July and came home seventh, beaten more than forty lengths by the winner. He subsequently finished eighth at Ballinrobe Racecourse on 23 June, thirteenth at Galway Racecourse on 3 August and seventh at Ballinrobe on 12 August. As in all of his starts that year Flooring Porter was ridden by Jonathan Moore when he started at odds of 7/1 for a hurdle at Bellewstown on 29 August and recorded his first success as he came from the rear of the field to take the lead at the third-last hurdle and won "comfortably" by seven lengths from Ashton Court.

Four weeks after his win at Bellewstown, Flooring Porter started favourite for a novice hurdle at Downpatrick Racecourse and finished fourth of the eight runners behind Nibblers Charm. The gelding was then matched against more experienced opponents in a Handicap over three miles at Cork on 20 October and won "comfortably", taking the lead and the last and drawing away to take the prize by two and a half lengths at odds of 4/1. At Leopardstown Racecourse on 29 December Flooring Porter contested a novice handicap in which he was among the leaders for most of the way but faded in the closing stages and came home sixth behind Peaches And Cream. He ended his first season on 13 February, when he finished second to the fourteen-year-old Seskinane in a handicap on heavy ground at Navan Racecourse.

=== 2020/21 National Hunt season ===
On his first start of his second season Flooring Porter was assigned top weight of 164 pounds for a minor handicap over three miles at Gowran Park on 20 July. With Moore in the saddle he moved up to dispute the lead at the second struggle and got the better of a sustained struggle with the seven-year-old Cusp of Carabelli to win by half a length. The gelding was beaten in handicaps on his next two starts, finishing third to Great White Shark at Galway on 31 July and second to Streets of Doyen at Gowran Park on 3 October. On 5 December at Navan Flooring Porter started a 22/1 outsider for a three mile handicap in which carried 146 pounds and was ridden by Moore. He took the lead soon after the start and recovered from a mistake at the third last to draw away and win "easily" by twelve lengths from the favourite The Bosses Oscar.

Twenty-three days after his win at Navan, the gelding was stepped up in class for the Grade 1 Christmas Hurdle at Leopardstown, after his owners paid a supplementary entry fee, and went off the 11/1 fifth-choice in the betting. The Dorans Pride Novice Hurdle winner Fury Road started favourite, while the other five runners included Sire du Berlais (Lismullen Hurdle), The Storyteller (Ladbrokes Champion Chase), Bapaume (Champion Four Year Old Hurdle) and Bacardys (Champion Novice Hurdle). Flooring Porter took the lead from the start, went clear of his rivals approaching the final hurdle and stayed on well to win by six lengths from The Storyteller. Gavin Cromwell's representative Feidhlim Cunningham, said: "There has been huge improvement in him. He's good going left-handed... Fair play to the owners. We suggested supplementing him for this and they backed us. They put the money where their mouth is and it's fairly paid off. He's really improved and Gavin has done a wonderful job with him. Johnny has given him a peach again... we're just thrilled to get the Grade 1 winner."

On 18 March at Cheltenham Racecourse Flooring Porter was partnered by Danny Mullins when he started at odds of 12/1 in a fifteen runner field for the Grade 1 Stayers' Hurdle. Jonathan Moore felt unable to take the ride after being injured in a fall and recommended Mullins as the best replacement. The contenders for the race included the previous winners Paisley Park (the 9/4 favourite) and Lisnagar Oscar as well as Sire du Berlais, Fury Road, The Storyteller, Bacardys, Beacon Edge (Boyne Hurdle), Vinndication (Sodexo Gold Cup), If The Cap Fits (Liverpool Hurdle), Sam Spinner (Long Walk Hurdle) and Lil Rockerfeller (Ascot Hurdle). In a repeat of his performance at Leopardstown Flooring Porter made all the running, broke clear after the second last flight and kept on well up the run-in to win by three and a quarter lengths from Sire du Berlais. Cromwell said "He ran straight and true today, bar going right at the last. Other than that he was grand... Everybody knows how hard it is to get a good horse. We came across this lad by accident, he was a very cheap store so it's a bit of a fairytale really – it just goes to show dreams can still happen."

== Pedigree ==
Pedigree of Flooring Porter, bay gelding, 2015
Sire Yeats (IRE) 2001	Sadler's Wells (USA); 1981	Northern Dancer (CAN)	Nearctic
Sire Yeats (IRE) 2001	Sadler's Wells (USA); 1981	Northern Dancer (CAN)	Natalma (USA)
Sire Yeats (IRE) 2001	Sadler's Wells (USA); 1981	Fairy Bridge	Bold Reason
Sire Yeats (IRE) 2001	Sadler's Wells (USA); 1981	Fairy Bridge	Special
Sire Yeats (IRE) 2001	Lyndonville (IRE); 1988	Top Ville	High Top
Sire Yeats (IRE) 2001	Lyndonville (IRE); 1988	Top Ville	Sega Ville (FR)
Sire Yeats (IRE) 2001	Lyndonville (IRE); 1988	Diamond Land (GB)	Sparkler (IRE)
Sire Yeats (IRE) 2001	Lyndonville (IRE); 1988	Diamond Land (GB)	Canaan
Dam Lillymile (IRE) 2005	Revoque (IRE); 1994	Fairy King (USA)	Northern Dancer (CAN)
Dam Lillymile (IRE) 2005	Revoque (IRE); 1994	Fairy King (USA)	Fairy Bridge
Dam Lillymile (IRE) 2005	Revoque (IRE); 1994	La Bella Fontana	Lafontaine (USA)
Dam Lillymile (IRE) 2005	Revoque (IRE); 1994	La Bella Fontana	Sorebelle (GB)
Dam Lillymile (IRE) 2005	Miles Apart (IRE); 1993	Roselier (FR)	Misti
Dam Lillymile (IRE) 2005	Miles Apart (IRE); 1993	Roselier (FR)	Prince Rose
Dam Lillymile (IRE) 2005	Miles Apart (IRE); 1993	Spicy Lady	Decent Fellow
Dam Lillymile (IRE) 2005	Miles Apart (IRE); 1993	Spicy Lady	Sayadahl (GB) (Family: 13-a)

- Flooring Porter is inbred 3 × 4 to Northern Dancer and Fairy Bridge, meaning that this stallion and mare appear in both the third and fourth generations of his pedigree.
