= 2012 Champion Hurdle =

Horse race

82nd Champion Hurdle
- Champion Hurdle
- Location: Cheltenham Racecourse
- Date: 13 March 2012
- Winning horse: Rock On Ruby (IRE)
- Jockey: Noel Fehily
- Trainer: Paul Nicholls (GB)
- Owner: The Festival Goers

The 2012 Champion Hurdle was a horse race held at Cheltenham Racecourse on Tuesday 13 March 2012. It was the 82nd running of the Champion Hurdle.

The winner was The Festival Goers Rock On Ruby, a seven-year-old gelding trained by Paul Nicholls and ridden by Noel Fehily. The victory was the first in the race for owner, trainer and rider. Rock On Ruby was trained at Nicholls' satellite stable at Seaborough in Dorset, rather than his main yard at Ditcheat in Somerset, and much of the training was done by Harry Fry.

Rock On Ruby won by three and three quarter lengths from Overturn. Two previous winners of the race, Hurricane Fly and Binocular finished third and fourth. All ten of the runners completed the course.

== Race details ==
- Sponsor: Stan James
- Purse: £370,000; First prize: £210,715
- Going: Good
- Distance: 2 miles 110 yards
- Number of runners: 10
- Winner's time: 3m 50.10

== Full result ==
Pos.	Marg.	Horse (bred)	Age	Jockey	Trainer (Country)	Odds
1		Rock On Ruby (IRE)	6	Noel Fehily	Paul Nicholls (GB)	11/1
2	3¾	Overturn (IRE)	8	Jason Maguire	Donald McCain (GB)	20/1
3	1¾	Hurricane Fly (IRE)	8	Ruby Walsh	Willie Mullins (IRE)	4/6 fav
4	1	Binocular (FR)	8	A. P. McCoy	Nicky Henderson (GB)	4/1
5	hd	Zarkandar (IRE)	5	Daryl Jacob	Paul Nicholls (GB)	9/1
6	1¼	Oscars Well (IRE)	7	Robbie Power	Jessica Harrington (IRE)	14/1
7	3½	Brampour (IRE)	5	Harry Derham	Paul Nicholls (GB)	50/1
8	½	Zaidpour (FR)	6	Paul Townend	Willie Mullins (IRE)	22/1
9	5	Celestial Halo (GB)	8	Harry Skelton	Paul Nicholls (GB)	50/1
10	16	Kalann (GB)	5	Michael Darcy	Sabrina Harty (IRE)	150/1

- Abbreviations: nse = nose; nk = neck; hd = head; dist = distance; UR = unseated rider; PU = pulled up

== Winner's details ==
Further details of the winner, Rock On Ruby.

- Sex: Gelding
- Foaled: 11 May 2005
- Country: Ireland
- Sire: Oscar; Dam: Scandisk (Tirol)
- Owner: The Festival Goers
- Breeder: John O'Dwyer
