= Sicarelle =

French-bred Thoroughbred racehorse

- Sire: Sicambre
- Grandsire: Prince Bio
- Dam: Royal Maitresse
- Damsire: Vatellor
- Sex: Mare
- Foaled: 1953
- Country: France
- Colour: Bay
- Breeder: Suzy Volterra
- Owner: Suzy Volterra
- Trainer: François Mathet
- Record: 6: 3-0-0

Major wins
- Prix des Lilas (1956); Epsom Oaks (1956)

Awards
- Timeform rating = 128

Sicarelle (1953 – after 1969) was a French Thoroughbred racehorse and broodmare. Her racing career comprised six races in six months between April and October 1956. After wins in the Prix Perdita and Prix des Lilas she was sent to England and won the Epsom Oaks. She was unplaced in her next three races before being retired from racing. She had some success as a broodmare in the United States.

== Background ==
Sicarelle was a bay mare with a white blaze and a white sock on her left hind leg bred in France by her owner Suzy Volterra who had inherited the racing interests of her late husband Leon Volterra in 1949. The filly was sent into training with François Mathet at Chantilly.

She was from the first crop of foals sired by Sicambre, who won the Prix du Jockey Club and the Grand Prix de Paris in 1951. He went on to produce numerous other top-class winners including Celtic Ash, Diatome and Roi Dagobert. Sicarelle's dam Royale Maitresse was a granddaughter of the British broodmare Tout Paris (foaled 1911) whose other descendants have included Master Willie, Huntingdale and Subotica.

== Racing career ==
=== 1956: three-year-old season ===
Sicarelle was unraced as a juvenile and did not make her racecourse debut until April 1956 when she won the Prix Perdita at Tremblay Park. In May she followed up by winning the Prix des Lilas over 1600 metres at Longchamp Racecourse. In the 178th running of the Oaks over one and a half miles at Epsom Downs Racecourse on 9 June Sicarelle was ridden by Freddy Palmer and started the 3/1 favourite against thirteen opponents headed by the 1000 Guineas winner Honeylight. She won the race "comfortably" by three lengths from Janiari (winner of the Prix Penelope) with a gap of six lengths back to Yasmin in third place. The first three finishers were all trained in France.

Sicarelle failed to reproduce her best form in three subsequent races. When moved up in distance and matched against male opposition she finished towards the rear of the field in the 1600 metre Grand Prix de Paris at Longchamp. She was unable to confirm the Oaks form in the Prix Vermeille and finished unplaced behind Janiari. On her final start in October he ran unplaced behind Ribot in the Prix de l'Arc de Triomphe.

== Assessment and honours ==
At the end of the 1956 season the independent Timeform organisation gave Sicarelle a rating of 128. In their book, A Century of Champions, based on the Timeform rating system, John Randall and Tony Morris rated Sicarelle a "superior" winner of the Oaks.

== Breeding record ==
At the end of her racing career Sicarelle became a broodmare in France before being acquired by Claiborne Farm and exported to the United States. She produced at least six foals and four winners between 1959 and 1969:

- Norsarello, a colt, foaled in 1959, sired by Norseman
- Tanarelle, bay filly, 1961, by Tanerko
- Might, brown colt, 1966, by Bold Ruler. Won nine races.
- Triumphantly, bay filly, 1967, by Bold Ruler. Won four races.
- Ellesica, bay filly, 1968, by Bold Ruler. Won three races.
- Crying To Run, bay or brown colt, 1969, by Bold Ruler. Won one race.

== Pedigree ==
Pedigree of Sicarelle (FR), bay mare, 1953
Sire Sicambre (FR) 1949	Prince Bio (FR); 1941	Prince Rose (GB)	Rose Prince (FR)
Sire Sicambre (FR) 1949	Prince Bio (FR); 1941	Prince Rose (GB)	Indolence
Sire Sicambre (FR) 1949	Prince Bio (FR); 1941	Biologie	Bacteriophage
Sire Sicambre (FR) 1949	Prince Bio (FR); 1941	Biologie	Eponge
Sire Sicambre (FR) 1949	Sif (FR); 1936	Rialto	Rabelais (GB)
Sire Sicambre (FR) 1949	Sif (FR); 1936	Rialto	La Grelee
Sire Sicambre (FR) 1949	Sif (FR); 1936	Suavita	Alcantara
Sire Sicambre (FR) 1949	Sif (FR); 1936	Suavita	Shocking
Dam Royal Maitresse (FR) 1943	Vatellor (FR); 1933	Vatour	Prince Chimay (GB)
Dam Royal Maitresse (FR) 1943	Vatellor (FR); 1933	Vatour	Vasthi
Dam Royal Maitresse (FR) 1943	Vatellor (FR); 1933	Lady Elinor	Teddy
Dam Royal Maitresse (FR) 1943	Vatellor (FR); 1933	Lady Elinor	Madame Royale
Dam Royal Maitresse (FR) 1943	Royal Mistress (FR); 1920	Teddy	Ajax
Dam Royal Maitresse (FR) 1943	Royal Mistress (FR); 1920	Teddy	Rondeau (GB)
Dam Royal Maitresse (FR) 1943	Royal Mistress (FR); 1920	Tout Paris (GB)	St Frusquin (GB)
Dam Royal Maitresse (FR) 1943	Royal Mistress (FR); 1920	Tout Paris (GB)	Lady Linton (GB) (Family 4-j)

- Through her dam, Sicarelle was inbred 3 × 4 to Teddy, meaning that this stallion appears in both the third and fourth generations of her pedigree
