= 2011 Champion Hurdle =

Horse race

81st Champion Hurdle
- Champion Hurdle
- Location: Cheltenham Racecourse
- Date: 15 March 2011
- Winning horse: Hurricane Fly (IRE)
- Jockey: Ruby Walsh
- Trainer: Willie Mullins (IRE)
- Owner: George Creighton & Rose Boyd

The 2011 Champion Hurdle was a horse race held at Cheltenham Racecourse on Tuesday 15 March 2011. It was the 81st running of the Champion Hurdle.

The winner was George Creighton & Rose Boyd's Hurricane Fly, a seven-year-old gelding trained in Ireland by Willie Mullins and ridden by Ruby Walsh. The victory was the first in the race for owner, trainer and rider.

Hurricane Fly won by one and a quarter lengths from Peddlers Cross. There were no previous Champion Hurdlers in the field. All eleven of the runners completed the course.

== Race details ==
- Sponsor: Stan James
- Purse: £370,000; First prize: £210,937
- Going: Good
- Distance: 2 miles 110 yards
- Number of runners: 11
- Winner's time: 3m 53.71

== Full result ==
Pos.	Marg.	Horse (bred)	Age	Jockey	Trainer (Country)	Odds
1		Hurricane Fly (IRE)	7	Ruby Walsh	Willie Mullins (IRE)	11/4 fav
2	1¼	Peddlers Cross (IRE)	6	Jason Maguire	Donald McCain (GB)	9/2
3	5	Oscar Whisky (IRE)	6	Barry Geraghty	Nicky Henderson (GB)	7/1
4	2	Thousand Stars (FR)	7	Paul Townend	Willie Mullins (IRE)	33/1
5	1¼	Menorah (IRE)	6	Richard Johnson	Philip Hobbs (GB)	3/1
6	2	Clerk's Choice (IRE)	5	Tom Molloy	Michael Banks (GB)	50/1
7	5	Overturn (IRE)	7	Graham Lee	Donald McCain (GB)	40/1
8	¾	Dunguib (IRE)	8	Brian O'Connell	Philip Fenton (IRE)	10/1
9	½	Khyber Kim (GB)	9	Paddy Brennan	Nigel Twiston-Davies (GB)	12/1
10	10	Bygones of Brid (IRE)	8	Timmy Murphy	Karen McLintock (GB)	200/1
11	½	Mille Chief (FR)	5	Robert Thornton	Alan King (GB)	16/1

- Abbreviations: nse = nose; nk = neck; hd = head; dist = distance; UR = unseated rider; PU = pulled up

== Winner's details ==
Further details of the winner, Hurricane Fly.

- Sex: Gelding
- Foaled: 5 April 2004
- Country: Ireland
- Sire: Montjeu; Dam: Scandisk (Kenmare)
- Owner: George Creighton & Rose Boyd
- Breeder: Agricola Del Parco
