= Paisley Park (disambiguation) =

Paisley Park is the former estate of Prince.

Paisley Park may also refer to:

- Paisley Park Records, former record label of Prince
- Paisley Park (song), a song by Prince from his 1985 album Around the World in a Day
- Paisley Park Soccer Complex, a stadium in Altona North, Victoria, Australia
- Paisley Park (horse), a British-trained racehorse
