= Oscar Whisky =

Irish-bred Thoroughbred racehorse

- Sire: Oscar
- Grandsire: Sadler's Wells
- Dam: Ash Baloo
- Damsire: Phardante
- Sex: Gelding
- Foaled: 10 February 2005
- Country: Ireland
- Colour: Bay
- Breeder: Stephanie Hanly
- Owner: Walters Plant Hire Ltd
- Trainer: Nicky Henderson
- Record: 28:16-3-1
- Earnings: £500,606

Major wins
- Welsh Champion Hurdle (2011); Aintree Hurdle (2011, 2012); Relkeel Hurdle (2011, 2012); Ascot Hurdle (2012); Dipper Novices' Chase (2014); Scilly Isles Novices' Chase (2014)

Oscar Whisky (10 February 2005 – 6 December 2014) was an Irish-bred, British-trained Thoroughbred racehorse who competed in National Hunt racing. In his early career, he showed promise, winning two National Hunt Flat races and two novice hurdles. In the 2010/2011 National Hunt season, he emerged as one of the leading hurdlers in the British Isles, winning the Welsh Champion Hurdle and the Aintree Hurdle as well as finishing third behind Hurricane Fly in the Champion Hurdle. The following season he won the Relkeel Hurdle and a second Aintree Hurdle. He won the Ascot Hurdle and a second Relkeel Hurdle in 2012/2013 before being moved up to compete in steeplechases in the following season when he won the Dipper Novices' Chase and the Scilly Isles Novices' Chase. Oscar Whisky was fatally injured in a fall at Sandown Park Racecourse on 6 December 2014.

== Background ==
Oscar Whisky was a bay gelding with a white star and snip bred by Stephanie Hanly at Grange Hill Stud in Nenagh, County Tipperary. Hanly remembered Oscar Whisky as "a very taking, lovely, really strong foal". He was sired by Oscar, a horse who finished second to Peintre Celebre in the Prix du Jockey Club before becoming a leading sire of National Hunt horses. His other major winners have included Big Zeb (Queen Mother Champion Chase), Rock On Ruby (Champion Hurdle), Lord Windermere (Cheltenham Gold Cup), Peddlers Cross (Baring Bingham Novices' Hurdle), Black Jack Ketchum (Sefton Novices' Hurdle) and At Fishers Cross (Spa Novices' Hurdle). Oscar Whisky's dam, Ash Baloo won once from nine starts in National Hunt races in 1998 and 1999. She was a direct female-line descendant of Fifinella, a filly who won the Derby and the Oaks in 1916.

In November 2006, Oscar Whisky (who had already been gelded) was sent as a yearling to the Tattersalls Ireland sale and was bought for €36,000 by Oak Tree Farm. The gelding returned to the sales in June 2008 when he was bought for €80,000 by Dai Walters at the Goffs Land Rover Sale. Oscar Whisky raced in the colours of his owner's business Walters Plant Hire Ltd. He was trained throughout his racing career by Nicky Henderson at Lambourn in Berkshire and was ridden in all but one of his races by Barry Geraghty.

== Racing career ==
=== 2009/2010 National Hunt season: National Hunt Flat races and Novice hurdles ===
Oscar Whisky began his racing career in a National Hunt Flat race over one and a half miles at Newbury Racecourse on 21 March 2009. He started favourite in a field of sixteen four-year-olds and won "very easily" by nine lengths. After an eight-month break, the gelding returned in a two-mile National Hunt Flat race at Newbury in November. Starting the 8/15 favourite, he took the lead two furlongs from the finish and won by four lengths from Midnight Prayer, with the future Champion Hurdle winner Rock On Ruby in fourth place. A month later at the same course, Oscar Whisky made his debut over obstacles in a novice hurdle race. He was made the 4/11 favourite against thirteen opponents and won "effortlessly" by seven lengths. Oscar Whisky was prepared for the 2010 Cheltenham Festival with a very easy win in a novice hurdle at Sandown, beating ten opponents at odds of 4/11. At Cheltenham on 16 March 2010, Oscar Whisky started the 11/1 third favourite for the Grade I Supreme Novices' Hurdle and finished fourth of the eighteen runners behind Menorah, Get Me Out of Here and Dunguib.

=== 2010/2011 National Hunt season ===
Oscar Whisky was off the racecourse for over eight months before reappearing in a hurdle race at Cheltenham on 1 January 2011. Racing against more experienced opponents, he took the lead approaching the last hurdle and accelerated clear in the closing stages to win by seven lengths from Any Given Day, with Celestial Halo six lengths further back in third. Five weeks later, he started 2/7 favourite for the Welsh Champion Hurdle at Ffos Las Racecourse and won easily by eight lengths.

On his second appearance at the Cheltenham Festival, Oscar Whisky, having won six of his seven races, started the 7/1 fourth favourite for the 2011 Champion Hurdle. He took the lead at the second last hurdle but was soon overtaken and finished third behind Hurricane Fly and Peddlers Cross. Further back in the field were Thousand Stars, Menorah, Overturn, Dunguib and Khyber Kim. In April, Oscar Whisky was moved up in distance for the Grade I Aintree Hurdle over two and a half miles at Aintree Racecourse and started at odds of 6/1 in a field which included Peddlers Cross, Menorah, Thouand Stars, Celestial Halo and the 2010 Champion Hurdle winner Binocular. Geraghty tracked the leader Celestial Halo before taking the lead at the seventh of the eleven hurdles and opened up a three-length lead at the last obstacle. In the closing stages, Oscar Whisky held off a strong challenge from Thousand Stars to win by a neck, with a gap of ten lengths back to the outsider Salden Licht in third place. Barry Geraghty said: "He was very game. The plan was just to track Peddlers Cross. He came alive down the back, he winged it down there and I was just happy to go with it".

=== 2011/2012 National Hunt season ===
On his first appearance of the 2011/2012 National Hunt season, Oscar Whisky was made 5/6 favourite for the Grade II Ascot Hurdle in November but fell heavily when challenging Overturn for the lead at the last obstacle. In December, he was again made odds-on favourite when he contested the Grade II Relkeel Hurdle at Cheltenham. He raced in third place before moving up to take the lead after the penultimate hurdle and won by one and three-quarter lengths from Get Me Out of Here. After the race Henderson said "He jumped beautifully all the way, he got racing quite early – I know Barry wanted to hold on a bit longer but I suspect they didn't go a great gallop early. He was racing two out and he's quickened up nicely. That is a good trip for him". On 1 January, over the same course and distance he won again, beating his three opponents "very easily" at odds of 4/6. In his final preparation race for the Cheltenham Festival Oscar Whisky contested a two-mile flat race on the synthetic Polytrack surface at Kempton Park Racecourse. The race was run on National Hunt rules and he won very easily from six opponents at odds of 1/16.

On 15 March, Oscar Whisky was moved up in distance to contest the World Hurdle over three miles at Cheltenham. He was made the 4/1 second favourite behind Big Buck's, who was attempting to win the race for the fourth consecutive year. He tracked the favourite for much of the race but weakened in the closing stages and finished fifth behind Big Buck's, beaten thirteen lengths by the winner. In April, Oscar Whisky was matched against the 2012 Champion Hurdler Rock On Ruby and the 2011 Triumph Hurdle winner Zarkandar as he attempted to win his second Aintree Hurdle. He tracked the leader Rock On Ruby before taking the lead after the second last. In 2011, Thousand Stars emerged as his most serious challenger, and as in the previous year, Oscar Whisky prevailed by a neck after a prolonged struggle.

=== 2012/2013 National Hunt season ===
Oscar Whisky began the next season in the Ascot Hurdle and won easily by eight lengths from Raya Star, having led from the start. Only two horses appeared to oppose him in the Relkeel Hurdle and had no difficulty repeating his 2011 success in the race, leading all the way and finishing nineteen lengths clear of Crack Away Jack. In the Cleeve Hurdle over three miles at Cheltenham in January Geraghty adopted different tactics, restraining the gelding at the rear of the field before moving up to make his challenge at the last hurdle. Although he stayed on well in the closing stages, Oscar Whisky failed to overhaul the leader Reve de Sivola and was beaten a neck. In March 2013, Oscar Whisky ran for the third time at the Cheltenham Festival. He started the 9/4 favourite for the World Hurdle but began to struggle four hurdles from the finish and was tailed off when Geraghty pulled him up at the penultimate flight. In April, he attempted to win his third consecutive Aintree Hurdle in which he was ridden by A. P. McCoy, with Geraghty partnering with the Henderson stables' other runner Grandouet. Starting at odds of 5/1, he finished fourth behind Zarkandar, The New One and Thousand Stars.

=== 2013/2014 National Hunt season: Novice chases ===
In the 2013/2014 National Hunt season, Oscar Whisky was campaigned in novice chases. He made his debut over the larger obstacles at Cheltenham on 15 November when he stated the 4/6 favourite but was beaten a neck by the Jonjo O'Neill-trained six-year-old Taquin de Seuil in a race which was run at a very slow pace and resulted in a sprint finish. Four week later at the same course, he was matched against Wonderful Charm, a French-bred horse who had won the Rising Stars Novices' Chase and the Berkshire Novices' Chase. Oscar Whisky led from the start and beat Wonderful Charm by half length to record his first steeplechase victory.

The Dipper Novices' Chase at Cheltenham on 1 January saw a rematch between Oscar Whisky and Taquin de Seuil. The race was run on very soft ground which led to six of the seventeen fences being omitted for safety reasons. Oscar Whisky took the lead before the last fence and held off a challenge from Taquin de Seuil to win by three-quarters of a length. Only two horses turned out to oppose Oscar Whisky in the Grade I Scilly Isles Novices' Chase at Sandown on 1 February. Starting at odds of 1/6 he did not jump well but took the lead at the last and drew away in the closing stages to win by nine lengths. Commenting on what was described as a rather disappointing performance, Henderson suggested that the horse had not been suited by the soft ground and added, "He's a stuffy devil, that's why he had to have a run. He was having a great old heave in here [the winner's enclosure]. But I know what he's like". On 13 March, Oscar Whisky started 9/2 second favourite for the Grade I JLT Novices' Chase at the Cheltenham Festival but fell at the first fence. At Aintree a month later he started 7/4 favourite for the Grade I Manifesto Novices' Chase and finished second, beaten one and a half lengths by the French-bred six-year-old Uxizandre.

=== 2014/2015 National Hunt season: Steeplechases ===
On his first appearance of the 2014/2015 National Hunt season Oscar Whisky was assigned top weight of 166 pounds in the Paddy Power Gold Cup over two and a half miles at Cheltenham on 15 November. Starting at odds of 6/1 in an eighteen-runner field he recovered from a bump at the third last and finished well to take fourth place, two and a quarter lengths behind the winner Cead du Berlais. Oscar Whisky was then brought back in distance to contest the Grade I Tingle Creek Trophy at Sandown on 6 December. Ridden as usual by Geraghty, he was towards the rear of the ten runner field when falling at the sixth fence. Although the horse got up to his feet after the fall he had sustained a serious hind leg injury and was euthanised shortly afterward. Geraghty paid tribute to the horse saying "He was a warrior. He was so brave, reliable, and honest, and he'd never miss a day".

== Pedigree ==
Pedigree of Oscar Whisky (IRE), bay gelding, 2005
Sire Oscar (IRE) 1994	Sadler's Wells (USA); 1981	Northern Dancer	Nearctic
Sire Oscar (IRE) 1994	Sadler's Wells (USA); 1981	Northern Dancer	Natalma
Sire Oscar (IRE) 1994	Sadler's Wells (USA); 1981	Fairy Bridge	Bold Reason
Sire Oscar (IRE) 1994	Sadler's Wells (USA); 1981	Fairy Bridge	Special
Sire Oscar (IRE) 1994	Snow Day (FR); 1978	Reliance	Tantieme
Sire Oscar (IRE) 1994	Snow Day (FR); 1978	Reliance	Relance
Sire Oscar (IRE) 1994	Snow Day (FR); 1978	Vindaria	Roi Dagobert
Sire Oscar (IRE) 1994	Snow Day (FR); 1978	Vindaria	Heavenly Body
Dam Ash Baloo (IRE) 1994	Phardante (FR); 1982	Pharly	Lyphard
Dam Ash Baloo (IRE) 1994	Phardante (FR); 1982	Pharly	Comely
Dam Ash Baloo (IRE) 1994	Phardante (FR); 1982	Pallante	Taj Dewan
Dam Ash Baloo (IRE) 1994	Phardante (FR); 1982	Pallante	Cavadonga
Dam Ash Baloo (IRE) 1994	Lane Baloo (IRE); 1977	Lucky Brief	Counsel
Dam Ash Baloo (IRE) 1994	Lane Baloo (IRE); 1977	Lucky Brief	Welsh Rose
Dam Ash Baloo (IRE) 1994	Lane Baloo (IRE); 1977	Salle Privee	Big Game
Dam Ash Baloo (IRE) 1994	Lane Baloo (IRE); 1977	Salle Privee	Solisequious (Family:3-i)
