= Prestige Novices' Hurdle =

Prestige Novices' Hurdle
2026
Dalston Lad	Ubatuba	Tashkhan

Previous years
2025
Battle Born Lad	Moon Rocket	Roaring Conquest
2024
Now Is The Hour	Don't Rightly Know	Inox Allen
2023
Makin'yourmindup	Collectors Item	The King Of Ryhope
2022
Hillcrest	Crystal Glory	Scipion
2021
Alaphilippe	Mr Harp	Tupelo Mississippi

2020-2011
2020
Ramses De Teillee	Kalooki	Port Of Mars
2019
Lisnagar Oscar	Ask Ben	Stoney Mountain
2018
Chef Des Obeaux	Uppertown Prince	Golan Fortune
2017
The Worlds End	No Hassle Hoff	Ballyarthur
2016
Jonniesofa	Vintage Clouds	Duke Des Champs
2015
Definitly Red	Fletchers Flyer	Ballagh
2014
Toubeera	Kaki De La Pree	Oscar Rock
2013
Two Rockers	Ardkilly Witness	Shotgun Paddy
2012
Brindisi Breeze	Harry Topper	Meister Eckhart
2011
Back in Focus	Court in Motion	Neptune Equester

2010-2001
2010
Wymott	Wayward Prince	Kennel Hill
2009
Tarablaze	Thetwincamdrift	Jaunty Journey
2008
Tazbar	Sound Accord	Coe
2007
Chief Dan George	Itsa Legend	Hills of Aran
2006
Neptune Collonges	Five Colours	Rathowen
2005
Mephisto	Moulin Riche	Turpin Green
2004
Royal Rosa	Fundamentalist	Special Rate
2003
Iris's Gift	Priests Bridge	Tees Components
2001
Historic	Gola Cher	Freetown

2000-1991
2000
Shotgun Willy	Hopeful	Andrewjames
1999
Kates Charm	Kingsmark	Gentle Rivage
1997
Young Kenny	Korbell	Menesonic
1994
See Enough	Book of Music I	Gray's Ellergy
1993
Brackenfield	Gaelstrom	Lo Stregone
1992
Rothko	Muse	Triple Witching
1991
Smith's Cracker	Burgoyne	Merry Master

1990-1988
1990
Miinnehoma	Remittance Man	Beau Pari
1989
Pertemps Network	Young Bavard	Parsons Law
1988
Crumpet Delite	Rebel Song	Rowlandsons Jewels

The Prestige Novices' Hurdle is a Grade 2 National Hunt hurdle race in Great Britain which is open to horses aged four years or older. It is run at Haydock Park over a distance of about 2 miles and 7 furlongs (2 miles, 6 furlongs and 177 yards, or 4,588 metres), and during its running there are twelve hurdles to be jumped. The race is for novice hurdlers, and it is scheduled to take place each year in February.

The event was transferred to its present venue in 2001, having been held previously at Chepstow since 1992. Prior to 1991, the race was held at Newbury since its inception, as the Philip Cornes Saddle of Gold Stayers' Novices' Hurdle Final, in 1977.

Its distance at Haydock was initially 2 miles and 7½ furlongs. In 2008, the distance was extended to 3 miles and another furlong was added for the races in 2009 and 2010, but the distance reverted to 3 miles again in 2011. The present distance was introduced in 2012. The race is now sponsored by the vegetable growing company Albert Bartlett.

== Winners since 1977 ==
Year	Winner	Age	Jockey	Trainer
1977	Kas	5	Kevin Gray	P Ashworth
1978	Lighter	5	Philip Blacker	John Edwards
1979	Quarry Stone	6	Tommy McGivern	J Cox (Ir)
1980	Woodford Prince	7	John Francome	Peter Cundell
1981	Gaye Chance	6	Sam Morshead	Fred Rimell
1982	Angelo Salvini	6	Steve Knight	Peter Easterby
1983	Inish Glora	7	Robert Kington	Graham Thorner
1984	Bucko	7	Ron O'Leary	Jimmy FitzGerald
1985	Lonach	7	Richard Linley	Toby Balding
1986	Pike's Peak	5	Steve Smith Eccles	Nicky Henderson
1987	Abandoned due to snow
1988	Crumpet Delite	8	Mark Pitman	Jenny Pitman
1989	Pertemps Network	5	Peter Scudamore	Martin Pipe
1990	Miinnehoma	7	Peter Scudamore	Martin Pipe
1991	Smith's Cracker	5	Mark Pitman	Jenny Pitman
1992	Rothko	11	Richard Guest	Sue Smith
1993	Brackenfield	7	Peter Niven	Mary Reveley
1994	See Enough	6	Anthony Tory	Bob Buckler
1995	Abandoned due to waterlogging
1996	Abandoned due to frost
1997	Young Kenny	6	Robbie Supple	Peter Beaumont
1998	Abandoned due to waterlogging
1999	Kates Charm	6	Andrew Thornton	Robert Alner
2000	Shotgun Willy	6	Joe Tizzard	Paul Nicholls
2001	Historic	5	Carl Llewellyn	Tom George
2002	Abandoned due to waterlogging
2003	Iris's Gift	6	Barry Geraghty	Jonjo O'Neill
2004	Royal Rosa	5	Graham Lee	Howard Johnson
2005	Mephisto	6	Timmy Murphy	Howard Johnson
2006	Neptune Collonges	5	Christian Williams	Paul Nicholls
2007	Chief Dan George	7	Alan Dempsey	James Moffatt
2008	Tazbar	6	Phil Kinsella	Keith Reveley
2009	Tarablaze	6	Tony McCoy	Philip Hobbs
2010	Wymott	6	Jason Maguire	Donald McCain, Jr.
2011	Back in Focus	6	Brian Hughes	Howard Johnson
2012	Brindisi Breeze	6	Campbell Gillies	Lucinda Russell
2013	Two Rockers	6	Wayne Hutchinson	Alan King
2014	Toubeera	8	Aidan Coleman	Venetia Williams
2015	Definitly Red	6	Richard Johnson	Brian Ellison
2016	Jonniesofa	6	Craig Nichol	Rose Dobbin
2017	The Worlds End	6	Adrian Heskin	Tom George
2018	Chef Des Obeaux	6	Noel Fehily	Nicky Henderson
2019	Lisnagar Oscar	6	Sean Bowen	Rebecca Curtis
2020	Ramses De Teillee	8	David Noonan	David Pipe
2021	Alaphilippe	7	Paddy Brennan	Fergal O'Brien
2022	Hillcrest	7	Richard Patrick	Henry Daly
2023	Makin'yourmindup	6	Lorcan Williams	Paul Nicholls
2024	Now Is The Hour	7	Sean Flanagan	Gavin Cromwell
2025	Battle Born Lad	6	Jamie Hamilton	Mark Walford
2026	Dalston Lad	6	Harry Skelton	Dan Skelton

== See also ==
- Horseracing in Great Britain
- List of British National Hunt races
