= Relkeel Hurdle =

Hurdle horse race in Britain

Relkeel Hurdle
2026
Kabral Du Mathan	Jingko Blue	Lucky Place

Previous years
2025
Lucky Place	Gowel Road	Golden Ace
2024
Bob Olinger	Marie's Rock	Brewin'upastorm
2023
Marie's Rock	Dashel Drasher	First Street
2022
Stormy Ireland	Mcfabulous	Guard Your Dreams
2021
Mcfabulous	On The Blind Side	Thomas Darby

2020-2011
2020
Summerville Boy	Roksana	William Henry
2019
Midnight Shadow	Wholestone	Old Guard
2018
Wholestone	Agrapart	Colin's Sister
2017
Agrapart	L'Ami Serge	Cole Harden
2016
Camping Ground	Lil Rockerfeller	Cole Harden
2014
Rock on Ruby	Volnay De Thaix	Brother Brian
2013
More of That	Salubrious	Glens Melody
2012
Oscar Whisky	Crack Away Jack	Brampour
2011
Oscar Whisky	Get Me Out of Here	Cockney Trucker

2010-2001
2010
Karabak	Any Given Day	Celestial Halo
2009
Zaynar	Cape Tribulation	Shalone
2007
Pouvoir	Good Bye Simon	Pigeon Island
2006
Black Jack Ketchum	Blazing Bailey	Palmridge
2005
Mighty Man	The Market Man	Prins Willem
2004
Lough Derg	Exotic Dancer	Dalaram
2003
Crystal d'Ainay	Sh Boom	Starzaan
2002
Eternal Spring	Classified	In Contrast
2001
See You Sometime	Montalcino I	Tres Touche

2000-1991
2000
Mister Banjo	Run For Paddy	Doctor Goddard
1999
Heros Fatal	Behrajan	Picket Piece
1998
Lady Rebecca	Zafarabad	Rainbow Frontier
1997
Daraydan	Mighty Moss	Red Raja
1996
Karshi	Mandys Mantino	Serenity Prayer
1994
Fatack	Top Spin	Spring Marathon
1993
Dance of Words	Satin Lover	Kadi
1992
Lonesome Glory	Al Mutahm	Beebob
1991
Granville Again	Tyrone Bridge	Crystal Spirit

1990-1989
1989
Morley Street	Deep Sensation	Ikdam

The Relkeel Hurdle is a Grade 2 National Hunt hurdle race in Great Britain which is open to horses aged five years or older. It is run on the New Course at Cheltenham over a distance of about 2 miles and 4½ furlongs (2 miles 4 furlongs and 56 yards, or 4,074 metres), and during its running there are ten hurdles to be jumped. The race is scheduled to take place each year on New Year's Day.

The event is named after Relkeel, a three-time winner of Cheltenham's Bula Hurdle in the late 1990s. The Relkeel Hurdle was given Grade 2 status in 2006.

The race was first run in 1988 as the Sport of Kings Challenge. The race was renamed the Lonesome Glory Hurdle in 1993, after the American-trained challenger who had won the race the previous year.

The current name was adopted in 2000. The race was originally run at Cheltenham's International meeting in early December before being moved to the course's New Year Day fixture from the 2016 running.

== Winners ==
Year	Winner	Age	Jockey	Trainer
1988	Abbreviation	5	Peter Hobbs	Josh Gifford
1989	Morley Street	5	Jimmy Frost	Toby Balding
1990	Abandoned due to snow
1991	Granville Again	5	Peter Scudamore	Martin Pipe
1992	Lonesome Glory	4	Blythe Miller	Bruce F Miller
1993	Dance of Words	4	Warren Marston	Howard Johnson
1994	Fatack	5	Sean Curran	Jacqui Doyle
1995	Abandoned due to frost
1996	Karshi	6	Jamie Osborne	Henrietta Knight
1997	Daraydan	5	Tony McCoy	Martin Pipe
1998	Lady Rebecca	6	Rodney Farrant	Venetia Williams
1999	Heros Fatal	5	Tony McCoy	Martin Pipe
2000	Mister Banjo	4	Mick Fitzgerald	Paul Nicholls
2001 (Note: The 2001 running took place at Newbury)	See You Sometime	6	Mick Fitzgerald	Seamus Mullins
2002	Eternal Spring	5	Ruby Walsh	James Fanshawe
2003	Crystal d'Ainay	4	Robert Thornton	Alan King
2004	Lough Derg	4	Timmy Murphy	Martin Pipe
2005	Mighty Man	5	Richard Johnson	Henry Daly
2006	Black Jack Ketchum	7	Tony McCoy	Jonjo O'Neill
2007	Pouvoir	4	Robert Thornton	Alan King
2008	Abandoned due to waterlogging
2009	Zaynar	4	Barry Geraghty	Nicky Henderson
2010	Karabak	7	Tony McCoy	Alan King
2011	Oscar Whisky	6	Barry Geraghty	Nicky Henderson
2012	Oscar Whisky	7	Barry Geraghty	Nicky Henderson
2013	More of That	5	Tony McCoy	Jonjo O'Neill
2014	Rock On Ruby	9	Noel Fehily	Harry Fry
2016	Camping Ground	6	Leighton Aspell	Robert Walford
2017	Agrapart	6	Lizzie Kelly	Nick Williams
2018	Wholestone	7	Daryl Jacob	Nigel Twiston-Davies
2019	Midnight Shadow	6	Danny Cook	Sue Smith
2020	Summerville Boy	8	Jonathan Burke	Tom George
2021 (Note: The 2021 race was run at Kempton Park after the original Cheltenham fixture was abandoned due to waterlogging)	McFabulous	7	Harry Cobden	Paul Nicholls
2022	Stormy Ireland	8	Danny Mullins	Willie Mullins
2023	Marie's Rock	8	Nico de Boinville	Nicky Henderson
2024	Bob Olinger	9	Rachael Blackmore	Henry de Bromhead
2025	Lucky Place	6	Nico de Boinville	Nicky Henderson
2026	Kabral Du Mathan	6	Harry Skelton	Dan Skelton

== See also ==
- Horse racing in Great Britain
- List of British National Hunt races
