= Sicambre =

French-bred Thoroughbred racehorse

- Sire: Prince Bio
- Grandsire: Prince Rose
- Dam: Sif
- Damsire: Rialto
- Sex: Stallion
- Foaled: 1948
- Country: France
- Colour: Bay
- Breeder: Haras de Saint Pair du Mont
- Owner: Jean Stern
- Trainer: Max Bonaventure
- Record: 9: 8-1-0

Major wins
- Grand Criterium (1950); Prix de Guiche (1951); Prix Greffulhe (1951); Prix Hocquart (1951); Prix du Jockey Club (1951); Grand Prix de Paris (1951)

Awards
- Leading sire in France (1966); Timeform rating:135

Sicambre (1948–1975) was a French Thoroughbred racehorse and Champion sire.

== Background ==
Sicambre was bred by Jean Stern at his Haras de Saint Pair du Mont in Le Cadran, Calvados. Stern raced and owned him throughout his life.

== Racing career ==
Trained by Max Bonaventure, in the only defeat of his career, Sicambre finished second in the 1950 Prix Morny. He then won the 1950 Grand Criterium, France's most important race for two-year-olds. At age three, Sicambre won three important conditions races plus two French Classics, the Prix du Jockey Club and Grand Prix de Paris, in the process earning a Timeform rating of 135.

== Stud record ==
Sicambre was retired to stand at stud beginning in 1952 at his owners Haras de Saint Pair du Mont where he died on April 30, 1975. Sicambre represented a strong power and stamina of the 1950s. The leading sire in France in 1966, Sicambre sired:

- Sicarelle (b. 1953) - won 1956 Epsom Oaks
- Celtic Ash (b. 1957) - won Belmont Stakes, 3rd leg of the U.S. Triple Crown series
- Ambergris (b. 1958) - won Irish Oaks, Champion Irish Three-Year-old Filly
- Hermieres (b. 1958) - 1961 Prix de Diane
- Belle Sicambre (b. 1961) - Won 1963 Prix Eclipse, 1964 Prix de Diane and Prix Saint-Alary
- Cambremont (b. 1962) - won Poule d'Essai des Poulains
- Diatome (b. 1962) - won 1965 Prix Noailles, Washington, D.C. International Stakes, 1966 Prix Ganay
- Roi Dagobert (dkb/br. 1964) - won 1967 Prix Lupin, Prix Greffulhe, Prix Noailles
- Sacramento Song (b. 1967) - a sire who influenced the breeding history of show jumping horses

Through his daughter Sicalade, Sicambre was the damsire of Sea Bird who won the 1965 Prix de l'Arc de Triomphe and who earned the highest Timeform rating in history.

== Sire line tree ==
- Sicambre
  - Sertorius
  - Shantung
    - Felicio
      - Itajara
        - Ozanam
        - Siphon
  - Celtic Ash
    - Celtic Cone
      - Earth Summit
    - Athens Wood
    - Hoche
  - Pharamond
  - Tiziano
  - Moutiers
  - Cambremont
  - Diatome
  - Phaeton
    - Vitiges
      - Moon Madness
  - Roi Dagobert
    - Wittgenstein
      - The Wonder
        - Wonder Man
        - A Magicman
    - On The Sly
    - Abary
  - Sacramento Song
    - Sandro
      - Sao Paulo
        - Satchmo
      - Salido Z
      - Silvio I
        - Spider Murphy
        - Sterntanzer
        - Sunrise
        - Shutterfly
        - Sir Lui
        - Sir Holtrup
        - Sergeant Pepper
      - Sandro Song
        - Sandro Hit
      - Silvio II
        - Osilvis
          - On Point
          - Odysseus
      - Sympatico
      - Sandro Boy
        - Saccor
        - Sandro Man de L
        - Sandro Boy Junior
        - Fantomas de Muze
      - Safari
    - Sacramento Son
    - Symphatico

== See also ==
- List of leading Thoroughbred racehorses
- Coulisa
