= Siphon (horse) =

Brazilian-bred thoroughbred racehorse

- Sire: Itajara
- Grandsire: Felicio
- Dam: Ebrea
- Damsire: Kublai Khan
- Sex: Stallion
- Foaled: November 2, 1991; Rio Claro, São Paulo, Brazil
- Color: Bay
- Breeder: Haras São José e Expedictus
- Owner: Rio Claro Thoroughbreds Eduardo De Paula Machado Linneo Coudelaria Jéssica
- Record: 25: 12-6-2
- Earnings: US$3,136,428

Major wins
- Grande Prêmio Presidente Jose de Souza Queiroz (1994) Grande Prêmio Juliano Martins (1994); Grande Prêmio Presidente Antonio Correa Barbosa (1994); Sport Page Handicap (1995); Mervyn LeRoy Handicap (1996); Hollywood Gold Cup (1996) Santa Anita Handicap (1997)

Siphon (foaled November 11, 1991) is a Brazilian-bred Thoroughbred racehorse and multiple G1-winner in Brazil and the United States.

== Background ==
Siphon was bred by Haras São José e Expedictus and foaled in 1991. He was sired by the champion Itajara, who is considered by many to be the best Brazilian racehorse of all time. Siphon's dam is Ebrea, from the family of one of the founding mares of Haras São José e Expedictus.

== Race career ==
Siphon's racing career began in Brazil, where he ran in and won four of four races at Cidade Jardim. He was exported to Argentina in November, 1994, running unplaced in the Gran Premio Nacional and Gran Premio Carlos Pellegrini. Siphon was then exported to the United States, where he was trained by Richard Mandella and won the Hollywood Gold Cup Stakes and Santa Anita Handicap, among other races.

== Stud career ==
After retiring from his racing career, Siphon was syndicated and entered stud at Airdrie Stud in 1998. He had a promising start at stud. Siphon was moved to Regal Heir Farms in Pennsylvania for the 2006 breeding season. He later stood stud at Pin Oak Lane Stud, also in Pennsylvania. In 2010, Siphon was sold back to Brazil to stand stud at Haras Bagé do Sul. Siphon has sired multiple graded stakes winners, including Siphonic, Siphonizer, Sharp Impact, and I'm the Tiger.

== Pedigree ==
Pedigree of Siphon (BRZ), bay stallion, foaled November 11, 1991
Sire Itajara (BRZ)	Felicio (FR)	Shantung (FR)	Sicambre (FR)
Sire Itajara (BRZ)	Felicio (FR)	Shantung (FR)	Barley Corn (GB)
Sire Itajara (BRZ)	Felicio (FR)	Fighting Edie (GB)	Guersant (FR)
Sire Itajara (BRZ)	Felicio (FR)	Fighting Edie (GB)	Edie Kelly (GB)
Sire Itajara (BRZ)	Apple Honey (BRZ)	Falkland (GB)	Right Royal (FR)
Sire Itajara (BRZ)	Apple Honey (BRZ)	Falkland (GB)	Argentina (GB)
Sire Itajara (BRZ)	Apple Honey (BRZ)	Irish Song (BRZ)	Maki* (BRZ)
Sire Itajara (BRZ)	Apple Honey (BRZ)	Irish Song (BRZ)	Udaipur (BRZ)
Dam Ebrea (BRZ)	Kublai Khan (ARG)	Sideral (ARG)	Seductor (ARG)
Dam Ebrea (BRZ)	Kublai Khan (ARG)	Sideral (ARG)	Starling (GB)
Dam Ebrea (BRZ)	Kublai Khan (ARG)	Fantasista (ARG)	Tatán (ARG)
Dam Ebrea (BRZ)	Kublai Khan (ARG)	Fantasista (ARG)	Fantasy (ARG)
Dam Ebrea (BRZ)	Resela (BRZ)	Svengali (BRZ)	Fort Napoleon (FR)
Dam Ebrea (BRZ)	Resela (BRZ)	Svengali (BRZ)	Tacy (BRZ)
Dam Ebrea (BRZ)	Resela (BRZ)	Eridan (BRZ)	Maki* (BRZ)
Dam Ebrea (BRZ)	Resela (BRZ)	Eridan (BRZ)	Urisca (BRZ)

* Siphon is inbred 4S x 4D to the stallion Maki, meaning that he appears fourth generation on the sire side of his pedigree and fourth generation on the dam side of his pedigree.
