= Abary (horse) =

German-bred Thoroughbred racehorse

- Sire: Roi Dagobert (FR)
- Grandsire: Sicambre (FR)
- Dam: Antioquia
- Damsire: Derring-Do
- Sex: Stallion
- Foaled: 1980
- Country: Germany
- Colour: blk/br
- Breeder: Gestüt Fährhof
- Owner: Gestüt Fährhof
- Trainer: Heinz Jentzsch

Major wins
- Grosser Preis von Berlin (1983, 1984)
- Last updated on 31 October 2010

Abary (DE) (foaled 1980, died 2002) was a Thoroughbred racehorse (blk/br.), by Roi Dagobert (FR) out of Antioquia, a half-sister to Acatenango. He was twice winner of the Grosser Preis von Berlin (1983, 1984), trained by Heinz Jentzsch. The owner and breeder was Gestüt Fährhof.

In addition to his victories in the Group 1 Grosser Preis von Berlin he also won the Group 2 Großer Preis der Badischen Wirtschaft twice (1983, 1984) and was placed in other Group 1 and 2 races in Germany and abroad. Ridden by Maurice Philipperon he ran in the 1984 Prix de l'Arc de Triomphe, finishing 17th behind Sagace, Northern Trick and All Along.

He stood at stud in Germany and France. He died in 2002 from colic.
