= Itajara (horse) =

Brazilian-bred thoroughbred racehorse

- Sire: Felicio
- Grandsire: Shantung
- Dam: Apple Honey
- Damsire: Falkland
- Sex: Stallion
- Foaled: October 31, 1983
- Country: Brazil
- Colour: Bay
- Breeder: Haras São José e Expedictus
- Owner: Haras São José e Expedictus
- Trainer: Francisco Saraiva
- Jockey: José Ferreira dos Reis
- Record: 7: 7–0–0

Major wins
- Grande Prêmio Estado Rio de Janeiro (1987) Grande Prêmio Francisco Eduardo de Paula Machado (1987); Grande Prêmio Cruzeiro do Sul (1987) Grande Prêmio Jockey Club Brasileiro (1987)

Itajara was an undefeated Brazilian Thoroughbred racehorse who won the Brazilian Triple Crown and is considered by many to be the greatest Brazilian racehorse.

== Background ==
Itajara was bred by Haras São José e Expedictus, out of the homebred graded stakes winner Apple Honey. His sire Felicio was a Group One stakes winner in his native France who had become a successful sire in Brazil.

== Racing career ==
Itajara won all seven of his starts, all of them run at Hipódromo da Gávea. He was trained by Francisco Saraiva and ridden by José Ferreira dos Reis in all of his races. Itajara won at distances from 1100 to 3000 meters, on both dirt and turf tracks. Itajara won four group one races, including the Brazilian Rio de Janeiro Triple Crown.

== Stud record ==
After his racing career, Itajara was retired to stand at stud at Haras São José e Expedictus in 1987, where he was stabled next to Derek, another unbeaten racehorse bred by the Haras.

In 1993, Itajara was exported to Argentina, where he stood that year at stud at Haras El Alfalfar, covering 42 mares. He died there on February 20, 1994, before the next breeding season.

Itajara is the sire of G1 winners Siphon and Ozanam, as well as several other graded stakes winners.

== Sire line tree ==
- Itajara
  - Ozanam
  - Siphon
    - Siphonic
    - I'm The Tiger
    - Sharp Impact
    - Siphonizer

== Pedigree ==
Pedigree of Itajara (BRZ), bay stallion, foaled October 31, 1983
Sire Felicio	Shantung	Sicambre	Prince Bio
Sire Felicio	Shantung	Sicambre	Sif
Sire Felicio	Shantung	Barley Corn	Hyperion*
Sire Felicio	Shantung	Barley Corn	Schiaparelli
Sire Felicio	Fighting Edie	Guersant	Bubbles
Sire Felicio	Fighting Edie	Guersant	Montagnana
Sire Felicio	Fighting Edie	Edie Kelly	Bois Roussel
Sire Felicio	Fighting Edie	Edie Kelly	Caerlissa
Dam Apple Honey	Falkland	Right Royal	Owen Tudor*
Dam Apple Honey	Falkland	Right Royal	Bastia
Dam Apple Honey	Falkland	Argentina	Nearco
Dam Apple Honey	Falkland	Argentina	Silvery Moon
Dam Apple Honey	Irish Song	Maki	Formasterus
Dam Apple Honey	Irish Song	Maki	Canicula
Dam Apple Honey	Irish Song	Udaipur	Dragon Blanc
Dam Apple Honey	Irish Song	Udaipur	La Fleche

* Itajara is inbred 4S x 5D to the stallion Hyperion, meaning that he appears fourth generation on the sire side of his pedigree and fifth generation (via Owen Tudor) on the dam side of his pedigree.

== See also ==
- List of leading Thoroughbred racehorses
