= Rock On Ruby =

Irish-bred Thoroughbred racehorse

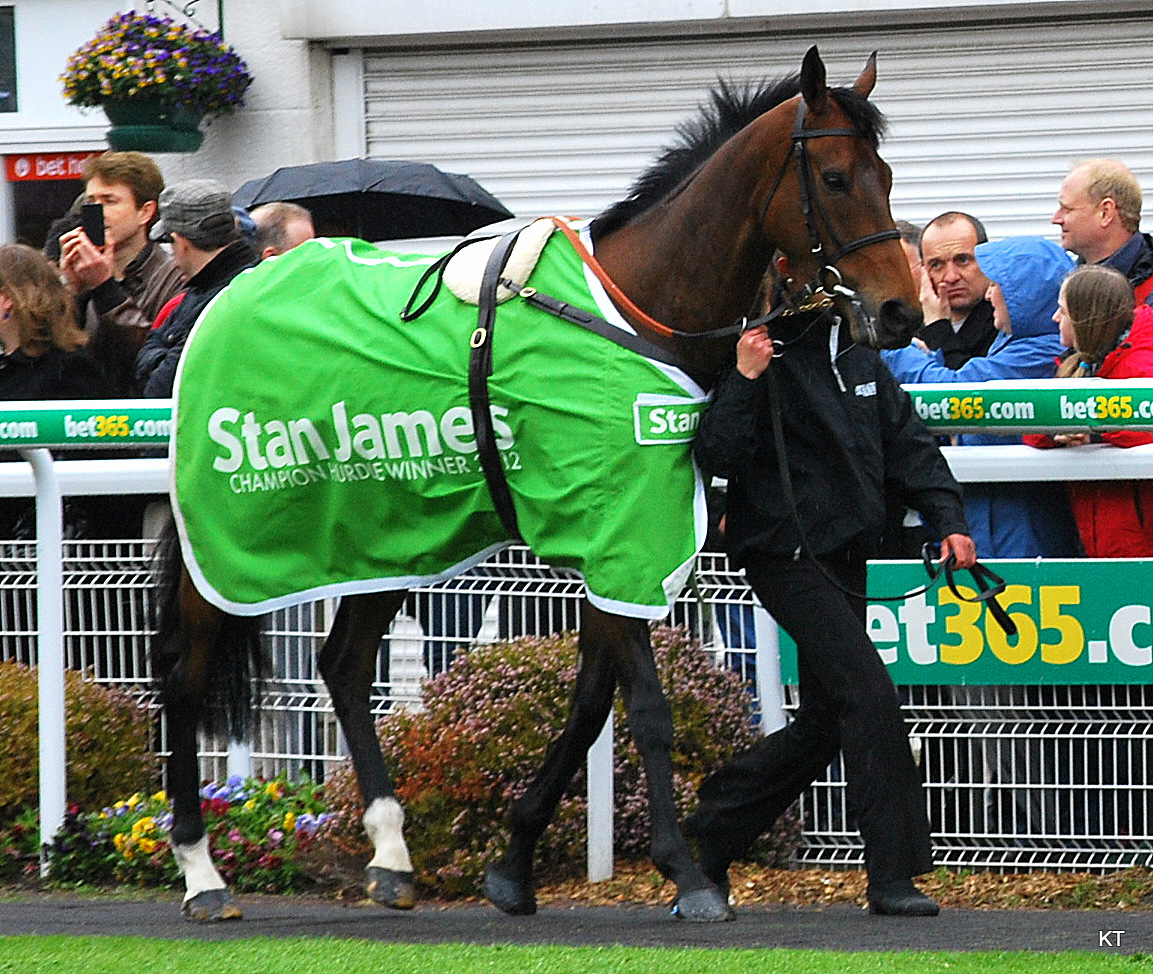
- Rock On Ruby at Sandown in April 2012.
- Sire: Oscar
- Grandsire: Sadler's Wells
- Dam: Stony View
- Damsire: Tirol
- Sex: Gelding
- Foaled: 11 May 2005
- Country: Ireland
- Colour: Bay
- Breeder: John O'Dwyer
- Owner: The Festival Goers
- Trainer: Paul Nicholls; Harry Fry
- Record: 27:12-8-5 (as of November 2015)
- Earnings: £636,290

Major wins
- Gerry Feilden Hurdle (2011); Champion Hurdle (2012); Relkeel Hurdle (2014); Ascot Hurdle (2015)

Rock On Ruby, (foaled 11 May 2005) is an Irish-bred, British-trained Thoroughbred racehorse. A specialist hurdler he is best known for his performances in the 2011–2012 National Hunt season, when he won the Gerry Feilden Hurdle at Newbury in November before winning Britain's most prestigious hurdle race, the Champion Hurdle at Cheltenham on 13 March. After failing to make a mark as a steeplechaser he returned to hurdling and won the Relkeel Hurdle in 2014 and the Ascot Hurdle in 2015.

== Background ==
Rock On Ruby is a bay horse bred in Ireland by John O'Dwyer. He is one of many successful jumpers (including Oscar Whisky, Big Zeb and Lord Windermere) sired by Oscar, a son of Sadler's Wells based at the Grange Stud in County Cork. His dam Stony View never raced but has produced at least two other winners. Rock On Ruby was first offered for sale as a foal in November 2005 when he was bought for €23,000 by the Whitehorse Stud. As a four-year-old gelding, he was sent to the Doncaster sales in May 2009 where he was bought for £23,000 by Richard Barber and entered the ownership of the Festival Goers syndicate. Although the horse was officially trained by Paul Nicholls at Ditcheat in Somerset, he was actually stabled twenty-five miles away in Nicholls' satellite yard at Seaborough in Dorset where his day-to-day conditioning was handled by the assistant trainer Harry Fry.

== Racing career ==
=== 2009–2010: National Hunt Flat races ===
Rock On Ruby began his career by running in National Hunt flat races. On his first appearance in a minor event at Newbury in November 2009, he finished fourth to Oscar Whisky, who went on to win the Aintree Hurdle in 2011 and 2012. Rock On Ruby recorded his first win on his next start at Taunton in February, beating Karasenir by three quarters of a length when ridden by his namesake, Ruby Walsh. On his only other start of the season he beat Karasenir again, this time carrying top weight of 163 pounds in a similar event at Newbury in March.

=== 2010–2011: Novice hurdles ===
Rock On Ruby began the 2010/2011 season by winning his third successive National Hunt flat race, this time at Cheltenham, and was then campaigned in Novice Hurdle races (races confined to horses which have not won over hurdles before the start of the season). He made a successful hurdling debut by winning a race at Newbury in December by six lengths: few details of his victory were reported as the race was run in thick fog. He was then moved up in class to contest the Grade II Classic Novices' Hurdle at Cheltenham in January. He jumped the last hurdle level with Bobs Worth but was beaten by two and a half lengths after his jockey dropped his whip 120 yards from the finish. Rock On Ruby was then promoted to the highest level at the Cheltenham Festival where he ran in the Grade I Neptune Investment Management Novices' Hurdle over two miles five furlongs. Ridden by Daryl Jacob, he took the lead at the last hurdle and ran on strongly but was caught "in the last stride" and beaten a short head by First Lieutenant. On his final start of the season, he finished third behind Spirit Son and Cue Card in the Mersey Novices' Hurdle at Aintree in April.

=== 2011–2012: hurdles ===
After being campaigned over longer distances as a novice, Rock On Ruby was brought back in distance on his first race of the 2011/2012 season. Running over two miles in the Gerry Feilden Hurdle, a handicap race at Newbury, he carried top weight of 164 pounds and won "readily" by six lengths from his stable companion Empire Levant, to whom he was conceding 24 pounds. Following this win he was strongly fancied for the Grade I Christmas Hurdle at Kempton Park and started 7/4 second favourite behind the 2010 Champion Hurdler Binocular. Rock On Ruby took a slight lead at the second last hurdle and looked the likely winner but after what the Racing Post described as a "thrilling battle", finished second to Binocular, beaten a neck at level weights.

In the 2012 Champion Hurdle at Cheltenham on 13 March, Rock On Ruby started 11/1 fourth choice in the betting, behind the reigning champion, Hurricane Fly, Binocular, and Zarkandar. From the start of the race, Rock On Ruby, ridden by Noel Fehily, tracked the leader, Overturn, and then moved up to dispute the lead two hurdles from the finish. He took a decisive advantage turning into the straight and ran on strongly under pressure, showing what the Daily Telegraph described as "tremendous courage" to win going away by three and three quarter lengths from Overturn, Hurricane Fly, and Binocular.

On his final start of the season, Rock On Ruby was sent to Liverpool for the Aintree Hurdle on 14 April. He led until being overtaken at the second last hurdle and finished third to Oscar Whiskey and Thousand Stars.

=== 2012–2013: hurdles ===
For the 2012/2013 National Hunt season, Rock On Ruby was officially trained by Harry Fry, who was now operating independently from Nicholls. He made his first appearance for his "new" trainer in the International Hurdle at Cheltenham in December when he finished third behind Zarkandar and Grandouet. Rock On Ruby had his trial race for his second Champion Hurdle in the 32Red Hurdle at Doncaster Racecourse in February in which he was matched against the Triumph Hurdle winner Countrywide Flame and the Nicky Henderson-trained Darlan, who had been favourite for the championship since winning the Christmas Hurdle. Rock On Ruby took the lead at the last hurdle and won by three lengths, but his victory was overshadowed by the death of Darlan, who was fatally injured in a fall at the last. At Cheltenham on 12 March Rock On Ruby started the 11/2 third favourite for his second Champion Hurdle. He led the field until the second last hurdle before being overtaken and beaten two and a half lengths by Hurricane Fly. On his final appearance of the season, he was sent to Ireland where he finished third to Hurricane Fly and Thousand Stars in the Punchestown Champion Hurdle.

=== 2013–2014: Novice chases ===
Rock On Ruby began the new National Hunt season in a hurdle race at Kempton in October in which he finished second, ten lengths behind The New One. On 16 December, the gelding ran in his first steeplechase when he started 1/10 favourite for a minor Novice race at Plumpton Racecourse and won "very easily" by four lengths. Only one horse, the Nicolls-trained Mr Mole appeared to oppose Rock On Ruby when he warmed up for the 2014 Cheltenham Festival in a novice chase at Doncaster on 9 February. Rock On Ruby led from the start and, despite two minor jumping errors, won by ten lengths. On 11 March, he started the 5/1 for the Grade I Arkle Challenge Trophy over two miles at Cheltenham. He made a very bad mistake at third fence, almost unseating Fehily, who dropped his whip. He never recovered and came home last of the eight finishers behind Western Warhorse. The gelding returned to hurdling in the Aintree Hurdle on 3 April. Starting at odds of 10/1 he took the lead at the eighth hurdle but was overtaken by the odds-on favourite The New One after the second last obstacle. He rallied strongly after the last but was unable to overhaul The New One and finished second, beaten a head by the winner. After the race, Harry Fry said that he was "thrilled to bits" with the performance and announced that the horse would be returned to hurdling permanently, with the 2015 Champion Hurdle as his principal objective.

=== 2014–2015: hurdles ===
On his first appearance of the new season, Rock On Ruby finished third in the Elite Hurdle at Wincanton on 8 November, conceding thirteen pounds to the winner Purple Bay. On 13 December he started favourite for the Relkeel Hurdle at Cheltenham and recorded his first hurdle win in twenty-two month as he defeated the five-year-old Volnay de Thaix by two and a quarter lengths. Four weeks later the gelding added a win in the Dornan Engineering Hurdle over the same course and distance, beating Vaniteaux and Cole Harden by two and a half lengths and a neck. He was trained for the World Hurdle at the Cheltenham Festival but was withdrawn a week before the race after contracting a respiratory infection. Rock On Ruby returned in the Aintree Hurdle on 9 April in which he started third choice in the betting behind Jezki and the Champion Hurdle runner-up Arctic Fire. He raced in second before taking the lead at the second last but was badly hampered when Arctic Fire fell at the final hurdle and finished second, thirteen lengths behind Jezki.

=== 2015–2016: hurdles ===
On 21 November 2015, Rock On Ruby started second favourite on his first start of the season when carrying top-weight in the Ascot Hurdle. He travelled well and looked to be overtaken in the home straight but after a major jumping mistake by one of the threatening rivals, Rock On Ruby managed to find more and extended at the line to win by two and half lengths.

Less than a week later on 27 November, trainer Harry Fry announced that Rock On Ruby has been retired following a tendon injury that he suffered when winning the Ascot Hurdle. Fry explained the decision to retire the ten year old: "if he was a younger horse we might have considered treating the injury and bringing him back a year or more later".

== Pedigree ==
Pedigree of Rock On Ruby (IRE), bay gelding, 2005
Sire Oscar (IRE) 1994	Sadler's Wells (USA); 1981	Northern Dancer	Nearctic
Sire Oscar (IRE) 1994	Sadler's Wells (USA); 1981	Northern Dancer	Natalma
Sire Oscar (IRE) 1994	Sadler's Wells (USA); 1981	Fairy Bridge	Bold Reason
Sire Oscar (IRE) 1994	Sadler's Wells (USA); 1981	Fairy Bridge	Special
Sire Oscar (IRE) 1994	Snow Day (FR); 1978	Reliance	Tantieme
Sire Oscar (IRE) 1994	Snow Day (FR); 1978	Reliance	Relance
Sire Oscar (IRE) 1994	Snow Day (FR); 1978	Vindaria	Roi Dagobert
Sire Oscar (IRE) 1994	Snow Day (FR); 1978	Vindaria	Heavenly Body
Dam Stony View (IRE) 1994	Tirol (IRE); 1987	Thatching	Thatch
Dam Stony View (IRE) 1994	Tirol (IRE); 1987	Thatching	Abella
Dam Stony View (IRE) 1994	Tirol (IRE); 1987	Alpine Niece	Great Nephew
Dam Stony View (IRE) 1994	Tirol (IRE); 1987	Alpine Niece	Fragrant Morn
Dam Stony View (IRE) 1994	Stony Ground (IRE); 1976	Relko	Tanerko
Dam Stony View (IRE) 1994	Stony Ground (IRE); 1976	Relko	Relance
Dam Stony View (IRE) 1994	Stony Ground (IRE); 1976	Peach Stone	Mourne
Dam Stony View (IRE) 1994	Stony Ground (IRE); 1976	Peach Stone	La Melba (Family:4-i)
