= Morley Street =

Irish racehorse

- Sire: Deep Run
- Grandsire: Pampered King
- Dam: High Board
- Damsire: High Line
- Sex: Gelding
- Foaled: 1984
- Country: Ireland
- Colour: Chestnut
- Breeder: Marshall Parkhill
- Owner: Salehurst Paper Company; Michael Jackson Bloodstock
- Trainer: Toby Balding
- Record: 46: 21-7-3
- Earnings: £589,589

Major wins
- Mumm Prize Novices' Hurdle (1989); Aintree Hurdle (1990, 1991, 1992, 1993); Breeders' Cup Steeplechase (1990, 1991); Ascot Hurdle (1990, 1991); Berkshire Hurdle (1991); Champion Hurdle (1991); Elite Hurdle (1992)

Awards
- American Champion Steeplechase Horse (1990, 1991)

Morley Street (1984-–2009) was an Irish racehorse. He was a specialist hurdler but also won steeplechases and races on the flat. In a racing career which lasted from November 1988 until December 1995, he ran forty-five times and won twenty races including the Champion Hurdle in 1991 and the Aintree Hurdle on four successive occasions. He won the title of American Champion Steeplechase Horse on two occasions, as a result of back-to-back wins in the Breeders' Cup Steeplechase.

== Background ==
Morley Street was a chestnut horse with a large white star, bred in Ireland by Marshall Parkhill. He was sired by Deep Run, an outstanding sire of jumpers whose other progeny included Dawn Run and Golden Cygnet. Morley Street's dam, High Board, was not a Thoroughbred, being a descendant of the mare Arab Maid, whose pedigree on her mother's side was uncertain. Arab Maid's other descendants included the dual Cheltenham Gold Cup winner Easter Hero. Two years after Morley Street was foaled, High Board produced his full brother Granville Again, who won the Champion Hurdle in 1993.

Morley Street was bought as an unraced three-year-old by the British businessman Michael Jackson, who first raced the horse in the name of his Salehurst Paper Company. The horse was named after a street close to Jackson's Salehurst office, near London Waterloo station. He was trained throughout his career by Toby Balding at Kimpton in Hampshire and was ridden in most of his important races by Jimmy Frost. Morley Street suffered throughout his career from bleeding. Balding treated the horse with a variety of substances including Lasix but was banned under British racing rules from using medication on race days.

== Racing career ==
=== 1988–1990: early career ===
Morley Street began his racing career by winning a National Hunt Flat race at Sandown Park Racecourse on 5 November 1988. He was then campaigned in Novice Hurdles (races for horses which have not won a hurdle race before the start of the season), and won races at Sandown, Newbury and Ascot. In March, he was sent to the Cheltenham Festival to contest the Sun Alliance Novices' Hurdle. He started 5/1 second favourite and finished fourth of the twenty-two runners behind Sayfar's Lad, Trapper John and Knight Oil. At Aintree Racecourse a month later, Morley Street recorded his first major win when he defeated Trapper John by one and a half lengths in the Mumm Prize Novices' Hurdle.

In the first half of the 1989/1990 season, Morley Street ran in three hurdle races, winning once and finishing second in the other two. His victory came in a leg of the Sport of Kings challenge series, in which the beaten horses included the leading American steeplechaser Jamaica Bay. At Cheltenham in March, Morley Street made his first challenge for the Champion Hurdle. He started at odds of 10/1 in a field which included the previous champions Beech Road and See You Then, and finished fifth of the nineteen runners behind Kribensis. Following his run in the Champion Hurdle, Jackson transferred the ownership of Morley Street his Michael Jackson Bloodstock company. In April, he returned to Aintree for the Aintree Hurdle over two and a half miles and started odds-on favourite. He took the lead at the last hurdle and accelerated clear to win by fifteen lengths.

=== 1990–1993: peak years ===
The 1990/1991 season was intended to be the one in which Morley Street would establish himself as a steeplechaser. He warmed up for the season by having his first race under Flat racing rules, in which he recorded an upset win over St Leger winner Michelozzo in a race at Goodwood Racecourse in early October. In an unusual move, he was then sent across the Atlantic for the Breeders' Cup Steeplechase at Belmont Park where the obstacles were larger than British hurdles, but smaller than British steeplechase fences. Morley Street won his biggest prize to date as he beat the Jonathan E. Sheppard-trained Summer Colony by eleven lengths. On his return to England, Morley Street won the Ascot Hurdle by three lengths and a Novices' Chase at Cheltenham, in which he beat the future Champion Chaser Deep Sensation by seven lengths. Morley Street's five-race winning streak came to an end at Ascot in December when he was beaten by Remittance Man in the Noel Novices' Chase after repeatedly jumping to the left on a right-handed course. Despite his defeat, he was made favourite for the Grade I Feltham Novices' Chase at Kempton, but jumped poorly again and was pulled up after breaking a blood-vessel. In February, he was voted American Champion Steeplechaser at the Eclipse Awards.

Morley Street was returned to hurdle racing after a break and won the Grade II Berkshire Hurdle at Newbury in March before running in his second Champion Hurdle. He started 4/1 favourite in a field of twenty-four runners. Frost sent Morley Street into the lead between the last two hurdles, and the gelding ran on in the closing stages to win by one and a half lengths from Nomadic Way. On his final start of the season, Morley Street won a second Aintree Hurdle, beating Nomadic Way by six lengths.

In the late summer of 1991, Morley Street briefly returned to Flat racing. He ran poorly in the Lonsdale Stakes at York but showed top-class staying form when finishing second by a short head to Great Marquess in the Doncaster Cup. In October, he was again sent to the United States for the Breeders' Cup Chase, run at Fair Hill Racecourse. He started odds-on favourite and won by nine and three quarter lengths from Declare Your Wish in a course record time. The performance was enough to earn him a second Eclipse award. Morley Street won a second Ascot Hurdle in November and was then rested until February when he ran in the Irish Champion Hurdle at Leopardstown Racecourse. He started odds-on favourite but was narrowly beaten by the locally trained Chirkpar. He started 2/1 favourite for the Champion Hurdle, with his younger brother Granville Again being the 9/2 second choice in the betting. Morley Street was in contention two hurdles from the finish, but failed to quicken and ran sixth behind Royal Gait. He ended the season with a third victory in the Aintree Hurdle, beating the Irish mare Minorettes Girl by half a length.

Morley Street won a flat race at Doncaster in October, and then began the new National Hunt season by beating Granville Again in the Elite Hurdle at Cheltenham in November. He failed to run up to his best form when finishing second as odds-on favourite in the Ascot Hurdle and was then beaten in races at Cheltenham and Sandown. In his third Champion Hurdle, he made no impression and finished twelfth behind Granville Again. In the Aintree Hurdle, Granville Again was made 10/11 favourite, and journalists predicted "further humiliation" for the former champion. Morley Street, however, returned to his best and defeated his younger brother by one and a half lengths. The win made him the first horse to win the Grade I race on four occasions.

=== 1993–1995: later career ===
After his win at Aintree in April 1993, Morley Street never won again. A return to steeplechasing in late 1993 brought no success, and he was pulled up in the 1994 Champion Hurdle. He was unplaced in four flat races in 1994 and finished fourth when sent to compete in a hurdle race at Merano in Italy that autumn. After spending a year in retirement at his owner's farm in East Sussex, Morley Street became restless and was returned to training. In November 1995, he showed some signs of a return when finishing third in the Ascot Hurdle, but was retired after finishing unplaced in the Long Walk Hurdle at Ascot a month later.

== Retirement ==
Morley Street died at the age of twenty-five on 26 February 2009. Toby Balding described him as "without a doubt the most versatile horse that I trained."

== Pedigree ==
Pedigree of Morley Street (GB), chestnut gelding, 1984
Sire Deep Run (GB) 1966	Pampered King; 1954	Prince Chevalier	Prince Rose
Sire Deep Run (GB) 1966	Pampered King; 1954	Prince Chevalier	Chevalerie
Sire Deep Run (GB) 1966	Pampered King; 1954	Netherton Maid	Nearco
Sire Deep Run (GB) 1966	Pampered King; 1954	Netherton Maid	Phase
Sire Deep Run (GB) 1966	Trial By Fire; 1958	Court Martial	Fair Trial
Sire Deep Run (GB) 1966	Trial By Fire; 1958	Court Martial	Instantaneous
Sire Deep Run (GB) 1966	Trial By Fire; 1958	Mitrailleuse	Mieuxce
Sire Deep Run (GB) 1966	Trial By Fire; 1958	Mitrailleuse	French Kin
Dam High Board (GB) 1977	High Line; 1966	High Hat	Hyperion
Dam High Board (GB) 1977	High Line; 1966	High Hat	Madonna
Dam High Board (GB) 1977	High Line; 1966	Time Call	Chanteur
Dam High Board (GB) 1977	High Line; 1966	Time Call	Aleria
Dam High Board (GB) 1977	Matchboard; 1963	Straight Deal	Solario
Dam High Board (GB) 1977	Matchboard; 1963	Straight Deal	Good Deal
Dam High Board (GB) 1977	Matchboard; 1963	Royal Alliance	King Hal
Dam High Board (GB) 1977	Matchboard; 1963	Royal Alliance	Queens Arms (Arab Maid family)
