= Red Rose Handicap Hurdle =

Hurdle horse race in Britain

Red Rose Handicap Hurdle
2025
| Electric Mason | Hartington | Phantomofthepoints |

Previous years
2024
Shoot First | One Big Bang | Phantomofthepoints
2023
Slate Lane | Fine Margin | Crambo
2022
Botox Has | Get A Tonic | Run For Oscar
2021
Dans Le Vent | Riggs | Bass Rock

2020-2011
2020
Main Fact | Third Wind | Highland Hunter
2019
Stoney Mountain | Acey Milan | Tedham
2018
Paisley Park | Shades Of Midnight | First Assignment
2017
Sam Spinner | The Dutchman | Theo's Charm
2016
Kruzhlinin | Theo's Charm | Yala Enki
2015
Baradari | Definitely Red | Batavir
2014
Aubusson | Big Easy | Dara Tango
2013
Gevrey Chambertin | Utopie Des Bordes | Lie Forrit
2012
Trustan Times | Holywell | Sivola De Sivola
2011
Dynaste | Benny Be Good | Synchronised

2010-2005
2010
Grands Crus | Barafundle | Peveril
2009
Diamond Harry | Burton Port | Lysander
2008
According To Pete | Souffleur | Alderburn
2007
Millenium Royal | Sonnyanjoe | Halcon Genelardais
2006
Halcon Genelardais | Irish Wolf | Jazz d'Estruval
2005
St Matthew | My Way de Solzen | Tees Components

The Red Rose Handicap Hurdle is a Premier Handicap National Hunt hurdle race in Great Britain which is open to horses aged four years or older. It is run at Haydock Park over a distance of about 3 miles and half a furlongs (3 miles and 58 yards, or 4,881 metres). It is a handicap race, and it is scheduled to take place each year in November.

From 2007 to 2016 this race featured the use of Fixed Brush hurdles. These are based on the French hurdle design, similar to plain fences but lower in height. Unlike the traditional hurdle they are very rigid in construction. In 2017 the race reverted to standard hurdles.

The race was first run in 2005. It was awarded Grade 3 status in 2011 (such races were rebranded as Premier Handicaps in 2022). It has been sponsored by Betfair since its inception and the race title has changed to promote various Betfair websites and promotions. The race gained the registered title of the Red Rose Handicap Hurdle in 2026 and it is now known as the Betfair Stayers' Red Rose Handicap Hurdle. The race is currently run on the same day as the Betfair Chase. Prior to 2018 it was run over distances around 2 miles and 7 furlongs.

== Winners ==
- Weights given in stones and pounds.

| Year | Winner | Age | Weight | Jockey | Trainer |
|---|---|---|---|---|---|
| 2005 | St Matthew | 7 | 11-04 | Padge Whelan | Sue Smith |
| 2006 | Halcon Genelardais | 6 | 10-02 | Robert Thornton | Alan King |
| 2007 | Millenium Royal | 7 | 11–12 | Christophe Pieux | François Doumen |
| 2008 | According To Pete | 7 | 10–13 | Graham Lee | Malcolm Jefferson |
| 2009 | Diamond Harry | 6 | 11–12 | Timmy Murphy | Nick Williams |
| 2010 | Grands Crus | 5 | 10-10 | Tom Scudamore | David Pipe |
| 2011 | Dynaste | 5 | 11-02 | Conor O'Farrell | David Pipe |
| 2012 | Trustan Times | 6 | 11–12 | Dougie Costello | Tim Easterby |
| 2013 | Gevrey Chambertin | 5 | 11-07 | Tom Scudamore | David Pipe |
| 2014 | Aubusson | 5 | 10–13 | Lizzie Kelly | Nick Williams |
| 2015 | Baradari | 5 | 11-02 | Harry Skelton | Dan Skelton |
| 2016 | Kruzhlinin | 9 | 10–13 | Richard Johnson | Philip Hobbs |
| 2017 | Sam Spinner | 5 | 10-09 | Joe Colliver | Jedd O'Keeffe |
| 2018 | Paisley Park | 6 | 11-12 | Aidan Coleman | Emma Lavelle |
| 2019 | Stoney Mountain | 6 | 11-03 | Tom O'Brien | Henry Daly |
| 2020 | Main Fact | 7 | 10-11 | Fergus Gillard | David Pipe |
| 2021 | Dans Le Vent | 8 | 10-07 | Isabel Williams | Evan Williams |
| 2022 | Botox Has | 6 | 11-04 | Caoilin Quinn | Gary Moore |
| 2023 | Slate Lane | 5 | 10-12 | Donagh Meyler | Emmet Mullins |
| 2024 | Shoot First | 8 | 11-05 | Alex Harvey | Charles Byrnes |
| 2025 | Electric Mason | 6 | 10-12 | Freddie Gordon | Chris Gordon |
| 2026 | Matty's Getaway | 7 | 12-00 | Ciaran Gethings | Kim Bailey & Mat Nicholls |

== See also ==
- Horse racing in Great Britain
- List of British National Hunt races
