= Grosser Preis der Badischen Wirtschaft =

Grosser Preis der Badischen Unternehmen
- Class: Group 2
- Location: Iffezheim Racecourse; Baden-Baden, Germany
- Race type: Flat / Thoroughbred
- Website: Baden-Baden

Race information
- Distance: 2,200 metres (1m 3f)
- Surface: Turf
- Track: Left-handed
- Qualification: Four-years-old and up
- Weight: 57 kg Allowances; 1 1/2 kg for fillies and mares Penalties; 3 kg for Group 1 winners * 1 1/2 kg for Group 2 winners * * since May 1 last year
- Purse: €70,000 (2011); 1st: €40,000

The Grosser Preis der Badischen Wirtschaft is a Group 2 flat horse race in Germany open to thoroughbreds aged four years or older. It is run at Baden-Baden over a distance of 2,200 metres (about 1 mile and 3 furlongs), and it is scheduled to take place each year in late May or early June.

The event was originally called the Grosser Preis der Badischen Wirtschaft, and it was initially a 1,800-metre race for horses aged three or older. Its distance was extended to 2,200 metres and the minimum age was raised to four in 1983.

The race was sponsored by Mercedes-Benz from 2001 to 2007, and during this period it was known as the Grosser Mercedes-Benz-Preis. It was renamed the Grosser Preis der Badischen Unternehmen in 2008. In 2016, the race recovered its original name, Grosser Preis der Badischen Wirtschaft.

== Records ==
Most successful horse (2 wins):

- Star Appeal – 1974, 1975
- Hohritt – 1980, 1981
- Abary – 1984, 1985
- Night Magic – 2010, 2011
- Iquitos - 2016, 2018

Leading jockey (6 wins):

- Andrasch Starke - Germany (1996), Oxalagu (1997), Caitano (1999), Sweet Wake (2005), Danedream (2012), Alter Adler (2022)

Leading trainer (7 wins):

- Heinz Jentzsch – Ulan (1972), Los Santos (1982), Abary (1984, 1985), Acatenango (1986), Astylos (1988), Astico (1989)

== Winners ==
Year	Winner	Age	Jockey	Trainer	Time
1972	Ulan	3	Horst Horwart	Heinz Jentzsch	1:56.40
1973	Germanist	4	Manfred Prinzinger	Siegfried Gülcher	1:50.70
1974	Star Appeal	4	Peter Alafi	Anton Pohlkötter	1:50.80
1975	Star Appeal	5	Fritz Drechsler	Theo Grieper	1:53.00
1976	Oliver	3	Dave Richardson	Arthur-Paul Schlaefke	1:51.40
1977	Kronenkranich	5	Dave Richardson	Theo Grieper	1:50.90
1978	Cagliostro	4	José Orihuel	Hein Bollow	2:00.20
1979	Pyjama Hunt	4	Jean-Pierre Lefèvre	Philippe Lallié	1:51.60
1980	Hohritt	6	Werner Kraffczyk	Erich Pils	1:55.20
1981	Hohritt	7	David Wildman	Richard Staudte	1:52.90
1982	Los Santos	4	Georg Bocskai	Heinz Jentzsch	1:51.90
1983	Stornello	5	Stephen Eccles	Adolf Wöhler	2:45.20
1984	Abary	4	Georg Bocskai	Heinz Jentzsch	2:30.30
1985	Abary	5	Georg Bocskai	Heinz Jentzsch	2:24.50
1986	Acatenango	4	Georg Bocskai	Heinz Jentzsch	2:24.30
1987	Helikon	4	Lutz Mäder	Bruno Schütz	2:26.80
1988	Astylos	4	Andrzej Tylicki	Heinz Jentzsch	2:21.50
1989	Astico	4	Andrzej Tylicki	Heinz Jentzsch	2:14.23
1990	Turfkönig	4	Georg Bocskai	Uwe Ostmann	2:14.66
1991	Ruby Tiger	4	Bruce Raymond	Paul Cole	2:14.35
1992	Hondo Mondo	4	Andreas Helfenbein	Uwe Ostmann	2:16.50
1993	Platini	4	Mark Rimmer	Bruno Schütz	2:15.36
1994	Kornado	4	Mark Rimmer	Bruno Schütz	2:27.02
1995	Freedom Cry	4	Sylvain Guillot	André Fabre	2:22.17
1996	Germany	5	Andrasch Starke	Bruno Schütz	2:20.97
1997	Oxalagu	5	Andrasch Starke	Bruno Schütz	2:12.92
1998	Steward	5	Sylvain Guillot	Dominique Sépulchre	2:19.27
1999	Caitano	5	Andrasch Starke	Andreas Schütz	2:23.70
2000	Silvano	4	Andreas Boschert	Andreas Wöhler	2:24.96
2001	Bonvivant	4	Jiri Palik	Horst Horwart	2:17.15
2002	Simoun	4	Andreas Suborics	Peter Schiergen	2:19.34
2003	Epalo	4	Terence Hellier	Andreas Schütz	2:19.98
2004	Touch of Land	4	Christophe Lemaire	Henri-Alex Pantall	2:18.42
2005	Sweet Wake	4	Andrasch Starke	Mario Hofer	2:18.91
2006	Arcadio	4	Andreas Suborics	Peter Schiergen	2:24.01
2007	Prince Flori	4	Adrie de Vries	Sascha Smrczek	2:21.95
2008	It's Gino	5	Kerrin McEvoy	Pavel Vovcenko	2:17.42
2009	Ambassador ^{[a]}	5	Terence Hellier	Torsten Mundry	2:20.52
2010	Night Magic ^{[b]}	4	Karoly Kerekes	Wolfgang Figge	2:15.90
2011	Night Magic	5	Karoly Kerekes	Wolfgang Figge	2:19.19
2012	Danedream	4	Andrasch Starke	Peter Schiergen	2:16.59
2013	Novellist	4	Eduardo Pedroza	Andreas Wohler	2:24.65
2014	Almandin	4	Filip Minarik	Jean-Pierre Carvalho	2:17.67
2015	Ito	4	Filip Minarik	Jean-Pierre Carvalho	2:19.06
2016	Iquitos	4	Norman Richter	Hans-Jürgen Gröschel	2:17.32
2017	Guignol	5	Filip Minarik	Jean-Pierre Carvalho	2:15.64
2018	Iquitos	6	Eddy Hardouin	Hans-Jürgen Gröschel	2:19.20
2019	Itobo	7	Marco Casamento	Hans-Jürgen Gröschel	2:17.25
2020	Quest The Moon	4	Rene Piechulek	Sarah Steinberg	2:20.37
2021	Kaspar	4	Adrie de Vries ^{[c]}	Markus Klug	2:22.27
2022	Alter Adler	4	Andrasch Starke	Waldemar Hickst	2:14.58
2023	Northern Ruler	5	Bauyrzhan Murzabayev	Andreas Wohler	2:19.43
2024	Fantastic Moon	4	Rene Piechulek ^{[d]}	Sarah Steinberg	2:16.05
2025	Lordano	6	Leon Wolff	Marcel Weiss	2:17.13
2026	Alleno	5	Sibylle Vogt	Marcel Weiss	2:21.23

^{a} Tres Rapide finished first in 2009, but she was relegated to third place following a stewards' inquiry.
^{b} The 2010 running took place at Hoppegarten.
^{c} The 2021 running took place at Mülheim.
^{d} The 2024 running took place at Cologne.

== See also ==
- List of German flat horse races
