= Big Zeb =

Irish-bred Thoroughbred racehorse

- Sire: Oscar
- Grandsire: Sadler's Wells
- Dam: Our Siveen
- Damsire: Deep Run
- Sex: Gelding
- Foaled: 13 May 2001
- Country: Ireland
- Colour: Bay
- Breeder: Lyle Buttimer
- Owner: Patrick Joseph Redmond
- Trainer: Colm Murphy
- Record: 33:13-11-3
- Earnings: £813,797

Major wins
- Swordlestown Cup Novice Chase (2008); Paddy Power Dial-A-Bet Chase (2008, 2010, 2011); Fortria Chase (2009, 2010, 2011); Tied Cottage Chase (2010); Queen Mother Champion Chase (2010); Punchestown Champion Chase (2011)

Awards
- Irish Horse of the Year (2010)

Big Zeb (foaled 13 May 2001) is a retired Irish Thoroughbred racehorse who competed in National Hunt racing and was best known for his performances in steeplechases over the minimum distance of two miles. He was slow to mature and made little impact in bumpers and hurdle races before being switched to chasing and winning the Swordlestown Cup Novice Chase in 2008. In the following season he won the Paddy Power Dial-A-Bet Chase but fell twice in five races. He reached his peak in the 2009/2010 season when he won the Fortria Chase and the Tied Cottage Chase before defeating a strong field to win the Queen Mother Champion Chase at the Cheltenham Festival. He won the Fortria Chase and the Paddy Power Dial-A-Bet Chase again in the next season and rebounded from a defeat in the Queen Mother Champion Chase to win the Punchestown Champion Chase. He won both the Fortria Chase and the Paddy Power Dial-A-Bet Chase for a third time in the autumn of 2011 but developed injury problems and failed to win in his remaining five races. He was retired in January 2013, having won thirteen of his thirty-three races.

== Background ==
Big Zeb is a bay horse with a large white star and white socks on his hind legs bred in Fermoy, County Cork by Lyle Buttimer. He was sired by Oscar, a horse who finished second to Peintre Celebre in the Prix du Jockey Club before becoming a leading sire of National Hunt horses. His other major winners have included Lord Windermere (Cheltenham Gold Cup), Rock On Ruby (Champion Hurdle), Oscar Whisky (Aintree Hurdle), Peddlers Cross (Baring Bingham Novices' Hurdle), Black Jack Ketchum (Sefton Novices' Hurdle) and At Fishers Cross (Spa Novices' Hurdle). Big Zeb's dam, Our Siveen, was bought by Buttimer for IR£7,500 in 1989 and produced thirteen foals before her death in 2007: Buttimer described Big Zeb as the "worst looking of the lot". Our Siveen was a great-granddaughter of Rififi, a broodmare whose other descendants included the leading Japanese racehorse Narita Brian.

As a three-year-old gelding, Big Zeb was sent to the Tattersalls Ireland sales in November 2001 where he was sold for 2,400 guineas. He entered the ownership of Patrick Joseph "Paddy" Redmond a hotelier and property developer based in Gorey, County Wexford. The gelding was trained throughout his racing career at Gorey by Colm Murphy.

== Racing career ==
=== Early career ===
Big Zeb began his racing career competing in National Hunt Flat races, also known as "bumpers". He made his racecourse debut at Limerick Racecourse on 5 February 2006 when he started 9/4 favourite against thirteen opponents and finished second, two and a half lengths behind the winner Clopf. On his only other start of the season he was beaten two lengths by Captain Cee Bee in a bumper at Fairyhouse in April.

Big Zeb began the next season in a bumper at Fairyhouse, for which he was made odds-on favourite but finished third behind Judge Deed and Rebel Chief. After a break of more than four months, the gelding returned in a novice hurdle race at Fairyhouse on 10 March. Ridden for the first time by Barry Geraghty, he took the lead approaching the second last hurdle and drew clear in "impressive" fashion to win by twelve lengths from fifteen opponents. In the following month he was moved up in class for the Flogas Ireland Novice Hurdle at the Punchestown Festival and started 4/1 joint-favourite with Sizing Europe in a field of twenty-four. Big Zeb tracked the leaders in the early stages before moving into second place at the penultimate hurdle but was unable to make further progress and was beaten three and a half lengths by Sizing Europe.

=== 2007/2008 National Hunt season ===
On his first appearance of the 2007/2008 season Big Zeb finished second, beaten thirteen lengths by Catch Me in a hurdle race at Fairyhouse on 1 December. He then began to compete in novice steeplechases, making a brief debut over the larger obstacles when he fell at the first fence Leopardstown on 29 December. Three days later at Fairyhouse he reappeared for a beginners' chase and started 11/4 joint-favourite in a field of twelve runners. Ridden by Davy Russell took the lead at the second last fence and went clear of his rivals to win easily by twelve lengths. Big Zeb fell at the first fence again at Gowran Park in January and was then moved up sharply in class for the Grade I Dr P. J. Moriarty Novice Chase. He led at the final fence but was overtaken and beaten five lengths by the French-bred five-year-old J'y Vole. The gelding started favourite for the Grade I Powers Gold Cup at Fairyhouse, but after leading for most of the race, he was caught in the closing stages and finished second to Conna Castle. On his final start of the season, Big Zeb faced both J'y Vole and Conna Castle in the Grade I Swordlestown Cup Novice Chase over two miles at the Punchestown Festival. Ridden by Geraghty, and starting at 4/1, he raced in third place before overtaking J'y Vole approaching the final fence. He drew clear of the field in the closing stages and won by four lengths from Thyne Again.

=== 2008/2009 National Hunt season ===
After an eight-month break, Big Zeb returned in the Grade I Paddy Power Dial-A-Bet chase at Leopardstown on 27 December in which he was matched against more experienced opponents, including the former Champion Chaser Newmill. He was restrained in the early stages by his amateur jockey Matt "Strawberry" O'Connor before moving up do dispute the lead three fences from the finish. He established a clear advantage in the straight and held off the challenge of Watson Lake to win by half a length. After the race, Murphy said; "He was a store horse last year but he's far more the finished article this season. Physically he's more mature after some niggly muscle problems, but the lack of a run was a worry". Big Zeb failed to complete the course in his next two starts, falling at the last second when traveling well at Punchestown in February and falling four fences from the finish in the Queen Mother Champion Chase on his first visit to the Cheltenham Festival in March. He reverted to smaller obstacles in April and won a hurdle race at Fairyhouse. He ended his season at Punchestown two weeks later when he returned to steeplechasing for the Grade I Kerrygold Champion Chase in which he was matched against the French-bred six-year-old Master Minded, the winner of the last two runnings of the Queen Mother Champion Chase. Big Zeb tracked Master Minded throughout the race, survived a bad mistake at the last fence and made a strong challenge in the closing stages, failing by a head to catch the favourite.

=== 2009/2010 National Hunt season ===
Big Zeb began his fifth season in November at Navan Racecourse when he carried top weight of 166 pounds on heavy ground in the Grade II Fortria Chase and won by half a length after Geraghty eased him down in the closing stages. Murphy was satisfied by the performance but said that the gelding would be "a stone better on better ground". In December he was sent to England and started favourite for the Grade I Tingle Creek Chase at Sandown Park Racecourse but appeared to be struggling just after half way and finished fourth of the five runners behind Twist Magic, Forpadydeplasterer and Well Chief. The horse was subsequently found to be suffering from ringbone although Murphy also admitted that he regretted running him so soon after his win at Navan. On his final race before the 2010 Cheltenham Festival Big Zeb was matched against the Paddy Power Chase winner Golden Silver in the Grade II Tied Cottage at Punchestown on 31 January. He took the lead four fences from the finish, went clear approaching the last, and won easily by seven lengths. Geraghty described the race as little more than a "strong schooling session".

On 17 March 2010, Big Zeb, ridden by Geraghty, started at odds of 10/1 for the Queen Mother Champion Chase against a field which included Master Minded (the 4/5 favourite), Twist Magic, Forpadydeplasterer, Well Chief and Golden Silver. He made a jumping error but recovered to track the leaders and moved into second place behind Forpadydeplasterer at the second last. He took the lead approaching the final fence and went clear on the run-in to win by six lengths from Forpadydeplasterer, with Kalahari King in third and Master Minded fourth. After the race Murphy said "He's had his bad days, and has made stupid mistakes, but everything has gone really well this year. Every day you live with the horse and for him do this is just magic" while Geraghty said "the horse had a good look around after the last and I thought he was going to pull up, but he found plenty when he needed to. I saw Master Minded coming but I had a lot left when I kicked for home". Commenting on the horses occasionally erratic jumping, Geraghty added "there's probably a fine line between being a great jumper and being a bit of an eejit".

=== 2010/2011 National Hunt season ===
On his first appearance of the 2010/2011 National Hunt season, Big Zeb repeated his 2009 success by winning the Fortria Chase, beating Golden Silver by one and a quarter lengths. On 13 December Big Zeb was named Irish Horse of the Year at the Horse Racing Ireland awards, beating the Arkle Challenge Trophy winner Sizing Europe and the flat racers Cape Blanco, Rite of Passage and Pathfork. Two weeks later, he won the Paddy Power Dial-A-Bet Chase for the second time, going three lengths clear at the last and holding off the challenge of Golden Silver to win by one and three quarter lengths with Scotsirish third and Captain Cee Bee last of the four runners.

As in the previous season, Big Zeb prepared for Cheltenham with a run in the Tied Cottage Chase. He took the lead three fence from the finish but was overtaken in the closing stages and beaten half a length by Golden Silver, with Sizing Europe seven lengths back in third. According to the Daily Express, Geraghty's ride was criticised by some observers who felt that he had gone to the front too soon. On 16 March he attempted to repeat his 2010 success in the Queen Mother Champion Chase and started the 3/1 second favourite behind Master Minded. He tracked the leaders before moving up to challenge Sizing Europe at the final fence but was outpaced on the run-in and finished second, five lengths behind the winner and four in front of Captain Cee Bee in third. At Punchestown in April Big Zeb, Sizing Europe and Captain Cee Bee met again in the Kerrygold Champion Chase, a race which also attracted Golden Silver and J'y Vole. As at Cheltenham, Big Zeb tracked Sizing Europe before challenging the leader at the final fence, but on this occasion he took the lead and held off the renewed challenge of his rival to win by three quarters of a length despite Geraghty dropping his whip 100 yards from the finish.

=== 2011/2012 National Hunt season ===
Robbie Power took over from Geraghty as Big Zeb's regular jockey for the 2011/2012 National Hunt season. In November, the gelding began the new season by winning the Fortria Chase for the third time, taking the lead three fences from the finish and beating Noble Prince by two lengths with Forpadydeplasterer a head away in third. In the following month he attempted to win a third Paddy Power Dial-A-Bet Chase and started 8/11 favourite against Noble Prince, Golden Silver, Forpadydeplasterer and Scotsirish. Big Zeb was settled behind the leaders before making his challenge at the last fence and overtaking Noble Prince on the run-in to win by one and a quarter lengths. After the race, Murphy commented "even at ten, he still has loads of pace. He met the last two fences spot-on, when it was needed, and won well."

In the Tied Cottage Chase in February, Big Zeb proved no match for Sizing Europe, who won easily by fifteen lengths. At Cheltenham in March he contested his third Queen Mother Champion Chase and started 13/2 third favourite in a field of eight runners. He moved into third place at the fourth fence and maintained that position throughout, finishing third, beaten one and a quarter lengths and fifteen lengths by Finian's Rainbow and Sizing Europe. He ended his season by finishing third behind Sizing Europe and Realt Dubh in the Punchestown Champion Chase in April.

=== 2012/2013 National Hunt season ===
In November 2012, Big Zeb attempted to win the Fortria Chase for the fourth time, but was beaten seven lengths into second place by the seven-year-old Flemenstar. In the Paddy Power Dial-A-Bet Chase a month later he was never in contention and finished fourth, twenty-six behind the winner Sizing Europe.

In January 2013, Murphy announced that Big Zeb had failed to recover from joint problems and would be retired from racing, saying that "the decision was made for us. We gave him a bit of time, but he still hadn't responded to treatment so we are retiring him for his own sake. He has been so good to us so it's the right thing to do."

== Pedigree ==
Pedigree of Big Zeb (IRE), bay gelding, 2001
Sire Oscar (IRE) 1994	Sadler's Wells (USA); 1981	Northern Dancer	Nearctic
Sire Oscar (IRE) 1994	Sadler's Wells (USA); 1981	Northern Dancer	Natalma
Sire Oscar (IRE) 1994	Sadler's Wells (USA); 1981	Fairy Bridge	Bold Reason
Sire Oscar (IRE) 1994	Sadler's Wells (USA); 1981	Fairy Bridge	Special
Sire Oscar (IRE) 1994	Snow Day (FR); 1978	Reliance	Tantieme
Sire Oscar (IRE) 1994	Snow Day (FR); 1978	Reliance	Relance
Sire Oscar (IRE) 1994	Snow Day (FR); 1978	Vindaria	Roi Dagobert
Sire Oscar (IRE) 1994	Snow Day (FR); 1978	Vindaria	Heavenly Body
Dam Our Siveen (IRE) 1983	Deep Run (GB); 1966	Pampered King	Prince Chevalier
Dam Our Siveen (IRE) 1983	Deep Run (GB); 1966	Pampered King	Netherton Maid
Dam Our Siveen (IRE) 1983	Deep Run (GB); 1966	Trial By Fire	Court Martial
Dam Our Siveen (IRE) 1983	Deep Run (GB); 1966	Trial By Fire	Mitrailleuse
Dam Our Siveen (IRE) 1983	Clontinty Queen (IRE); 1978	Laurence O	Saint Crespin
Dam Our Siveen (IRE) 1983	Clontinty Queen (IRE); 1978	Laurence O	Feevagh
Dam Our Siveen (IRE) 1983	Clontinty Queen (IRE); 1978	Si Si	Sica Boy
Dam Our Siveen (IRE) 1983	Clontinty Queen (IRE); 1978	Si Si	Rififi (Family:13-a)
