= Ascot Hurdle =

Hurdle horse race in Britain

Ascot Hurdle
2025
Wodhooh	Celtic Dino	Potters Charm

Previous years
2024
Lucky Place	Blueking D'oroux	Colonel Mustard
2023
Blueking D'oroux	Strong Leader	Theatre Glory
2022
Goshen	Brewin'upastorm	Uhtred
2021
Buzz	Song For Someone	Guard Your Dreams

2020-2011
2020
Song For Someone	Call Me Lord	Laurina
2019
If The Cap Fits	Call Me Lord	Lil Rockerfeller
2018
If The Cap Fits	Old Guard	Rayvin Black
2017
Lil Rockerfeller	L'Ami Serge	Wakea
2016
Yanworth	Lil Rockerfeller	Garde La Victoire
2015
Rock on Ruby	Court Minstrel	Brother Tedd
2014
Faugheen	Blue Fashion	Lac Fontana
2013
Annie Power	Zarkandar	Bygones of Brid
2012
Oscar Whisky	Raya Star	Brampour
2011
Overturn	For Non Stop	Katchit

2010-2001
2010
Silviniaco Conti	Karabak	Restless Harry
2009
Zaynar	Karabak	Red Moloney
2008
Chomba Womba	Crack Away Jack	Elusive Dream
2007
Hardy Eustace	Afsoun	Lough Derg
2006
Hardy Eustace	Mighty Man	Lough Derg
2005
No Refuge	Blue Canyon	Royal Shakespeare
2004
Monet's Garden	Monkerhostin	Ilnamar
2003
Mr Cool	Quazar	Sir Talbot
2002
Baracouda	Mr Cool	Carlovent
2001
Baracouda	Ballet-K	Carlovent

2000-1991
2000
Kates Charm	Serenus	Geos
1999
Wahiba Sands	Count Campioni	Mr Markham
1998
Juyush	Turnpole	Castle Sweep
1997
Pridwell	Ocean Hawk	Moscow Express
1996
Muse	Mistinguett	Fieldridge
1995
Large Action	Atours	Morley Street
1994
Oh So Risky	Top Spin	Flakey Dove
1993
King Credo	Sweet Duke	Flakey Dove
1992
Muse	Morley Street	Tyrone Bridge
1991
Morley Street	King's Curate	Danny Harrold

1990-1988
1990
Morley Street	Sabin Du Loir	Brabazon
1989
Nodform	Floyd	Combermere
1988
Sabin Du Loir	Gaye Brief	Ibn Majed

The Ascot Hurdle is a Grade 2 National Hunt hurdle race in Great Britain which is open to horses aged four years or older. It is run at Ascot over a distance of about 2 miles and 3½ furlongs (2 miles, 3 furlongs and 63 yards, or 3,879 metres), and during its running there are ten hurdles to be jumped. The race is scheduled to take place each year in November. It is currently sponsored by Ladbrokes bookmakers.

== Winners ==
Year	Winner	Age	Jockey	Trainer
1970	Bula	5	Paul Kelleway	Fred Winter
1971	Midsprite	5	Macer Gifford	Harry Thomson Jones
1972	Bula	7	Paul Kelleway	Fred Winter
1973	Moyne Royal	8	David Mould	A J Pitt
1974	Lanzarote	6	Richard Pitman	Fred Winter
1975	Lanzarote	7	John Francome	Fred Winter
1976	Dramatist	5	Bill Smith	Fulke Walwyn
1977	Dramatist	6	Bill Smith	Fulke Walwyn
1978	Kybo	5	Gerry Enright	Josh Gifford
1979	Connaught Ranger	5	Colin Tinkler	Fred Rimell
1980	Connaught Ranger	6	John Burke	Fred Rimell
1981	Lumen	6	Richard Rowe	Josh Gifford
1982	Al Kuwait	6	John Francome	Fred Winter
1983	Dawn Run	5	Jonjo O'Neill	Paddy Mullins
1984	Gaye Brief	7	Richard Linley	Mercy Rimell
1985	Gaye Brief	8	Richard Linley	Mercy Rimell
1986	Ibn Majed	4	John McLaughlin	Chuck Spares
1987	Sabin du Loir	8	Peter Scudamore	Martin Pipe
1988	Sabin du Loir	9	Peter Scudamore	Martin Pipe
1989	Nodform	5	Richard Rowe	Josh Gifford
1990	Morley Street	6	Jimmy Frost	Toby Balding
1991	Morley Street	7	Jimmy Frost	Toby Balding
1992	Muse	5	Paul Holley	David Elsworth
1993	King Credo	8	Adrian Maguire	Steve Woodman
1994	Oh So Risky	7	Paul Holley	David Elsworth
1995	Large Action	7	Jamie Osborne	Oliver Sherwood
1996	Muse	9	Paul Holley	David Elsworth
1997	Pridwell	7	Tony McCoy	Martin Pipe
1998	Juyush	6	Timmy Murphy	Jim Old
1999	Wahiba Sands	6	Tony McCoy	Martin Pipe
2000	Kates Charm	7	J. P. McNamara	Robert Alner
2001	Baracouda	6	Thierry Doumen	François Doumen
2002	Baracouda	7	Thierry Doumen	François Doumen
2003	Mr Cool	9	Tony McCoy	Martin Pipe
2004 (Note: The 2004 and 2005 runnings took place at Windsor)	Monet's Garden	6	Tony Dobbin	Nicky Richards
2005	No Refuge	5	Graham Lee	Howard Johnson
2006	Hardy Eustace	9	Conor O'Dwyer	Dessie Hughes
2007	Hardy Eustace	10	Conor O'Dwyer	Dessie Hughes
2008	Chomba Womba	7	Barry Geraghty	Nicky Henderson
2009	Zaynar	4	Andrew Tinkler	Nicky Henderson
2010	Silviniaco Conti	4	Noel Fehily	Paul Nicholls
2011	Overturn	7	Jason Maguire	Donald McCain, Jr.
2012	Oscar Whisky	7	Barry Geraghty	Nicky Henderson
2013	Annie Power	5	Ruby Walsh	Willie Mullins
2014	Faugheen	6	Ruby Walsh	Willie Mullins
2015	Rock On Ruby	10	Barry Geraghty	Harry Fry
2016	Yanworth	6	Barry Geraghty	Alan King
2017	Lil Rockerfeller	6	Trevor Whelan	Neil King
2018	If The Cap Fits	6	Noel Fehily	Harry Fry
2019	If The Cap Fits	7	Sean Bowen	Harry Fry
2020	Song for Someone	5	Nico de Boinville	Tom Symonds
2021	Buzz	7	Nico de Boinville	Nicky Henderson
2022	Goshen	6	Jamie Moore	Gary Moore
2023	Blueking D'Oroux	4	Harry Cobden	Paul Nicholls
2024	Lucky Place	5	Nico de Boinville	Nicky Henderson
2025	Wodhooh	5	Danny Gilligan	Gordon Elliot
2026	Kateira	9	Tristan Durrell	Dan Skelton

== See also ==
- Horse racing in Great Britain
- List of British National Hunt races
