= Handicap (horse racing) =

Horse race, carrying different weights

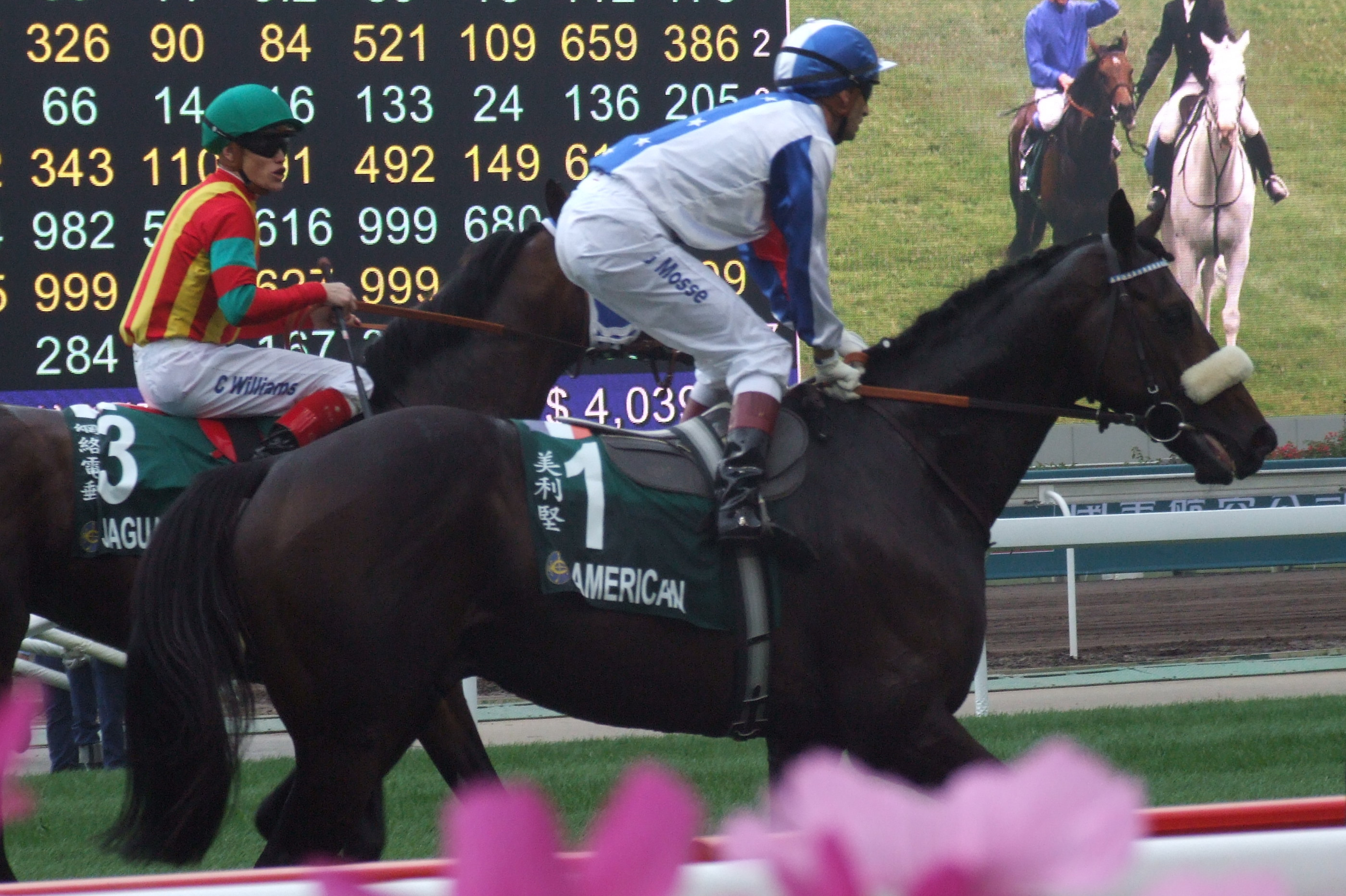
Americain, a winner of the Melbourne Cup, one of the most prestigious handicap races in the world

A handicap race in horse racing is a race in which each horse is assigned a specific weight to carry, determined by its past performance and perceived ability. Stronger horses carry more weight, while less accomplished ones carry less. This system aims to equalize the chances of all horses in the race.

The skill in betting on a handicap race lies in predicting which horse can overcome its handicap. Although most handicap races are run for older, less valuable horses with less prize money, this is not true in all cases; some prestigious races are handicaps, such as the Grand National steeplechase, Betfair Stayers' Handicap Hurdle in the UK and the Melbourne Cup in Australia. In the United States, over 30 handicap races are classified as Grade I, the top level of the North American grading system.

== Handicapping in action ==
In a horse handicap race (sometimes just called "handicap"), each horse must carry a specified weight called the impost, assigned by the racing secretary or steward based on factors such as past performances, so as to equalize the chances of the competitors. To supplement the combined weight of jockey and saddle, up to the assigned impost, lead weights are carried in saddle pads with pockets, called lead pads.

The weight-for-age scale was introduced by Admiral Rous, a steward of the Jockey Club. In 1855, he was appointed public handicapper. In Britain, the horses are assigned weights according to a centralised rating system maintained by the British Horseracing Authority (BHA). Weights may be increased if a horse wins a race between the publication of the weights and the running of the contest.

=== Predicting the outcome of races ===
In the USA, (thoroughbred) handicapping may also refer to the act of predicting and betting on horse racing.

== See also ==
- Graded stakes race
- Thoroughbred horse racing
- Weight for Age
- Allowance race
- Sports betting
