= Overturn (horse) =

Irish-bred Thoroughbred racehorse

- Sire: Barathea
- Grandsire: Sadler's Wells
- Dam: Kristal Bridge
- Damsire: Kris
- Sex: Gelding
- Foaled: 2004
- Country: Ireland
- Colour: Bay
- Breeder: Pendley Farm
- Owner: Mrs P. W. Harris; P. W. Harris; T. G. Leslie
- Trainer: Walter Swinburn; Donald McCain
- Record: 38: 12-8-4
- Earnings: £690,187

Major wins
- Scottish Champion Hurdle (2010); Northumberland Plate (2010); Galway Hurdle (2010); Chester Cup (2011); Ascot Hurdle (2011); Fighting Fifth Hurdle (2011)

Overturn (foaled 22 April 2004) is an Irish-bred thoroughbred racehorse trained by Donald McCain, Jr. He has amassed over £600,000 in prize money, and has won major races such as the 2011 Fighting Fifth Hurdle. He is the first ever horse to complete the double of winning Newcastle Racecourse's major flat race and major National Hunt race - the Northumberland Plate (Pitmen's Derby) and Fighting Fifth. He finished second behind Rock On Ruby in the 2012 Champion Hurdle.
