= Roi Dagobert =

French-bred Thoroughbred racehorse

Roi Dagobert (FR)
- Sire: Sicambre (FR)
- Grandsire: Prince Bio (FR)
- Dam: Dame d'Atour (FR)
- Damsire: Cranach (FR)
- Sex: Stallion
- Foaled: 16.2.1964
- Country: France
- Colour: dkb/br
- Record: 8: 4-3-0
- Earnings: FF1,208,254

Major wins
- Prix Lupin (1967); Prix Greffulhe (1967); Prix Noailles (1967)
- Last updated on 31 October 2010

Roi Dagobert (FR) (foaled February 16 1964) was a Thoroughbred racehorse (dkb/br.), by Sicambre (FR) out of Dame d'Atour (FR) (unraced). He was a champion three-year-old in France in 1967.

== Racing career ==
From eight starts he won four races, including the Prix Lupin (2100 m), the Prix Greffulhe (ridden by Yves Saint-Martin) (2100 m) and the Prix Noailles (then 2200 m), all at Longchamp. He was placed three times, including second in the Critérium de Saint-Cloud at Saint-Cloud and third in the Prix Ganay at Longchamp. His career total earnings were FF1,208,254.

== Stud record ==
Roi Dagobert stood at stud in the US from 1969 to 1973, in France from 1974 to 1985 and in Germany from 1986 to ?.

He sired On The Sly (USA) (1973), winner of 14 races including the Lou Smith Memorial Handicap, Rosemont Stakes, Jockey Club Gold Cup (Group 1), Hawthorne Gold Cup Handicap (Group 2).-G2, Whirlaway Handicap, Donald P. Ross Handicap (Group 2) and Grey Lag Handicap (Group 2); and Abary (DE) (1980), winner of the Grosser Preis von Berlin (Group 1 - twice), Großer Preis der Badischen Wirtschaft (Group 2 - twice)

He was broodmare sire of Made of Gold (USA)(1989), winner of the Royal Lodge Stakes (Group 2) and second in the Prix de la Salamandre (Group 1)

== Sire line tree ==
- Roi Dagobert
  - Wittgenstein
    - The Wonder
      - Wonder Man
      - A Magicman
  - On The Sly
  - Abary
