= Stayers Chase Triple Crown =

The Stayers Chase Triple Crown was a Betfair initiative started in 2005, called 'Betfair Million' to award £1 million prize for any horse who wins in the same season the Betfair Chase at Haydock in November, the King George VI Chase at Kempton on Boxing Day and the Cheltenham Gold Cup at the Cheltenham Festival. In the following season it suffered a couple alterations which included the Lexus Chase as an alternative for the King George VI Chase or winning the Grand National whilst being placed in top 2 at any race at the Cheltenham Festival.

The £1 million bonus for the triple crown was eventually dropped by Betfair in the 2010, only to be reintroduced in 2015 by the Jockey Club which followed the same race format of the premier staying chase division:

- Betfair Chase
- King George VI Chase
- Gold Cup

In the past, staying chasers such as Arkle, Desert Orchid and Best Mate had won the King George VI Chase at Kempton Park and the Cheltenham Gold Cup in the same season, however they never had the chance to complete the modern-day treble as the Betfair Chase was inaugurated in 2005. Only in 2006/2007 Kauto Star managed to complete the feat and became the first to win the £1 million bonus.

== Leg Winners ==
Winner Groups
Winners of the Triple Crown
Winners of 2 out of the 3 Triple Crown races that includes the Gold Cup
Winners of the Betfair Chase and King George

Season	Betfair Chase	King George VI Chase	Gold Cup
2005/06	Kingscliff	Kicking King	War of Attrition
2006/07	Kauto Star	Kauto Star	Kauto Star
2007/08	Kauto Star	Kauto Star	Denman
2008/09	Snoopy Loopy	Kauto Star	Kauto Star
2009/10	Kauto Star	Kauto Star	Imperial Commander
2010/11	Imperial Commander	Long Run	Long Run
2011/12	Kauto Star	Kauto Star	Synchronised
2012/13	Silviniaco Conti	Long Run	Bobs Worth
2013/14	Cue Card	Silviniaco Conti	Lord Windermere
2014/15	Silviniaco Conti	Silviniaco Conti	Coneygree
2015/16	Cue Card	Cue Card	Don Cossack
2016/17	Cue Card	Thistlecrack	Sizing John
2017/18	Bristol De Mai	Might Bite	Native River
2018/19	Bristol De Mai	Clan Des Obeaux	Al Boum Photo
2019/20	Lostintranslation	Clan Des Obeaux	Al Boum Photo
2020/21	Bristol De Mai	Frodon	Minella Indo
2021/22	A Plus Tard	Tornado Flyer	A Plus Tard
2022/23	Protektorat	Bravemansgame	Galopin Des Champs
