= 2008 Cheltenham Gold Cup =

Horse race

The 2008 Cheltenham Gold Cup was a horse race which took place at Cheltenham on Friday 14 March 2008. It was the 80th running of the Cheltenham Gold Cup, and it was won by Denman. The winner was ridden by Sam Thomas, and the first three horses were all trained by Paul Nicholls. The odds-on favourite Kauto Star finished second and Neptune Collonges was a close third.

The race had been billed as the most anticipated Gold Cup since Arkle and Mill House clashed in 1964, with Kauto Star racing against Denman for the first time. However, a close contest failed to materialise as Denman defeated his rival by a comfortable margin.

== Race details ==
- Sponsor: Totesport
- Winner's prize money: £268,279.10
- Going: Good to Soft
- Number of runners: 12
- Winner's time: 6m 47.84s

== Full result ==
	*	Horse	Age	Jockey	Trainer ^{†}	SP
1		Denman	8	Sam Thomas	Paul Nicholls	9/4
2	7	Kauto Star	8	Ruby Walsh	Paul Nicholls	10/11 fav
3	shd	Neptune Collonges	7	Mick Fitzgerald	Paul Nicholls	25/1
4	9	Halcon Genelardais	8	Robert Thornton	Alan King	16/1
5	16	Exotic Dancer	8	Tony McCoy	Jonjo O'Neill	17/2
6	16	Knowhere	10	Paddy Brennan	Nigel Twiston-Davies	25/1
7	65	Afistfullofdollars	10	Paul Carberry	Noel Meade (IRE)	20/1
PU	Fence 21	Iron Man	7	Denis O'Regan	Peter Bowen	100/1
PU	Fence 18	Celestial Gold	10	Timmy Murphy	David Pipe	100/1
PU	Fence 15	Contraband	10	Tom J. Dreaper	Paul Murphy	200/1
PU	Fence 14	Fustrien du Paon	12	Anthony Lecordier	Richard Chotard (FR)	250/1
PU	Fence 13	Azulejo	10	Tom Scudamore	Michael Scudamore	200/1

* The distances between the horses are shown in lengths or shorter. shd = short-head; PU = pulled-up.
† Trainers are based in Great Britain unless indicated.

== Winner's details ==
Further details of the winner, Denman:

- Foaled: 17 April 2000 in Ireland
- Sire: Presenting; Dam: Polly Puttens (Pollerton)
- Owner: Paul Barber and Margaret Findlay
- Breeder: Colman O'Flynn
