= 2007 Cheltenham Gold Cup =

The 2007 Cheltenham Gold Cup was a horse race which took place at the Cheltenham Racecourse on Friday March 16, 2007. It was the 79th running of the Cheltenham Gold Cup, and it was won by the pre-race favourite Kauto Star. The winner was ridden by Ruby Walsh and trained by Paul Nicholls.

Earlier in the season Kauto Star had won the first two legs of the Betfair Million, the Betfair Chase and the King George VI Chase. The Gold Cup was the final leg, and his victory earned a bonus prize of £1,000,000.

== Race details ==
- Sponsor: Totesport
- Winner's prize money: £242,335.00
- Going: Good to Soft
- Number of runners: 18
- Winner's time: 6m 40.46s

== Full result ==
	*	Horse	Age	Jockey	Trainer ^{†}	SP
1		Kauto Star	7	Ruby Walsh	Paul Nicholls	5/4 fav
2	2½	Exotic Dancer	7	Tony McCoy	Jonjo O'Neill	9/2
3	2½	Turpin Green	8	Tony Dobbin	Nicky Richards	40/1
4	5	Monkerhostin	10	Richard Johnson	Philip Hobbs	25/1
5	¾	Cane Brake	8	David Casey	Tom Taaffe (IRE)	20/1
6	½	State of Play	7	Paul Moloney	Evan Williams	8/1
7	1¼	L'Ami	8	Mick Fitzgerald	François Doumen (FR)	16/1
8	shd	Neptune Collonges	6	Liam Heard	Paul Nicholls	50/1
9	1½	Kingscliff	10	Robert Walford	Robert Alner	40/1
10	2½	Forget the Past	9	Barry Geraghty	Michael O'Brien (IRE)	25/1
11	2½	The Listener	8	Daryl Jacob	Robert Alner	14/1
12	8	My Will	7	Sam Thomas	Paul Nicholls	16/1
13	8	Beef Or Salmon	11	Andrew McNamara	Michael Hourigan (IRE)	16/1
14	104	Sybellius d'Artaix	7	James Davies	Richard Chotard (FR)	250/1
PU	Fence 20	Halcon Genelardais	7	Robert Thornton	Alan King	25/1
PU	Fence 19	Bob Bob Bobbin	8	Joe Tizzard	Colin Tizzard	100/1
Fell	Fence 17	Marble Garden	6	John Kington	Richard Chotard (FR)	250/1
UR	Fence 5	Idle Talk	8	Jason Maguire	Donald McCain, Jr.	50/1

* The distances between the horses are shown in lengths or shorter. shd = short-head; PU = pulled-up; UR = unseated rider.
† Trainers are based in Great Britain unless indicated.

== Winner's details ==
Further details of the winner, Kauto Star:

- Foaled: March 19, 2000 in France
- Sire: Village Star; Dam: Kauto Relka (Port Etienne)
- Owner: Clive D. Smith
- Breeder: Marie-Louise Aubert
