= 2009 Cheltenham Gold Cup =

Horse race in Cheltenham, Gloucestershire, England

The 2009 Cheltenham Gold Cup was a horse race which took place at Cheltenham on Friday March 13, 2009. It was the 81st running of the Cheltenham Gold Cup, and it was won by the pre-race favourite Kauto Star. The winner was ridden by Ruby Walsh and trained by Paul Nicholls.

Kauto Star became the first horse to regain the Gold Cup in the event's history. He had previously won it in 2007, and he was runner-up in 2008. The winning margin of thirteen lengths was the widest in the race since 1995.

== Race details ==
- Sponsor: Totesport
- Winner's prize money: £270,797.50
- Going: Good to Soft
- Number of runners: 16
- Winner's time: 6m 44.95s

== Full result ==
| | * | Horse | Age | Jockey | Trainer ^{†} | SP |
| 1 | | Kauto Star | 9 | Ruby Walsh | Paul Nicholls | 7/4 fav |
| 2 | 13 | Denman | 9 | Sam Thomas | Paul Nicholls | 7/1 |
| 3 | 2½ | Exotic Dancer | 9 | Tony McCoy | Jonjo O'Neill | 8/1 |
| 4 | 6 | Neptune Collonges | 8 | Christian Williams | Paul Nicholls | 15/2 |
| 5 | 2 | My Will | 9 | Nick Scholfield | Paul Nicholls | 100/1 |
| 6 | nk | Roll Along | 9 | Graham Lee | Carl Llewellyn | 40/1 |
| 7 | 9 | Barbers Shop | 7 | Barry Geraghty | Nicky Henderson | 10/1 |
| 8 | 10 | Madison du Berlais | 8 | Tom Scudamore | David Pipe | 10/1 |
| 9 | 5 | Albertas Run | 8 | Dominic Elsworth | Jonjo O'Neill | 14/1 |
| 10 | 14 | Knowhere | 11 | Paddy Brennan | Nigel Twiston-Davies | 100/1 |
| 11 | 1¾ | Cerium | 8 | Keith Mercer | Paul Murphy | 300/1 |
| 12 | 5 | Air Force One | 7 | Noel Fehily | Charlie Mann | 16/1 |
| 13 | 2¾ | Star de Mohaison | 8 | Timmy Murphy | Paul Nicholls | 20/1 |
| Fell | Fence 19 | Miko de Beauchene | 9 | Andrew Thornton | Robert & Sally Alner | 150/1 |
| PU | Fence 18 | Snoopy Loopy | 11 | Seamus Durack | Peter Bowen | 66/1 |
| PU | Fence 13 | Halcon Genelardais | 9 | Robert Thornton | Alan King | 40/1 |

* The distances between the horses are shown in lengths or shorter. nk = neck; PU = pulled-up.
† All trainers are based in Great Britain.

== Winner's details ==
Further details of the winner, Kauto Star:

- Foaled: March 19, 2000 in France
- Sire: Village Star; Dam: Kauto Relka (Port Etienne)
- Owner: Clive D. Smith
- Breeder: Marie-Louise Aubert
