= Rince Ri =

Irish-bred Thoroughbred racehorse

- Racing silks of Frank Moriarty
- Sire: Orchestra
- Dam: Mildred's Ball
- Damsire: Blue Refrain
- Sex: Gelding
- Foaled: 1993
- Country: Ireland
- Colour: Liver Chesnut
- Breeder: Frank Moriarty
- Owner: Frank Moriarty
- Trainer: Ted Walsh
- Record: 43: 12-7-6
- Earnings: £363,973

Major wins
- Nas Na Riogh Novice Chase (1999); Powers Gold Cup (1999); Ericsson Chase (1999, 2000); Pillar Chase (2002); Bobbyjo Chase (2003); Webster Cup Chase (2003)

Rince Ri was a National Hunt racehorse. He was trained in Ireland by Ted Walsh and owned by Frank Moriarty.

== Early career ==
He made his racecourse debut in December 1997, where he won a maiden hurdle at Navan and followed this up with two further wins in January and February, including a Grade 2 race. In his final appearance of the 1997/98 season, he was sent off favourite for a Grade 3 race at Navan and finished fourth.

== 1998/99 Season ==
The 1998/99 season saw Rince Ri embark on a novice chasing campaign. He won a beginners chase at Navan in November 1998 and followed this up with two more wins in January and February, both in Grade 3 races. After finishing second in another Grade 3 race, Rince Ri went to Fairyhouse for the Powers Gold Cup, where he won by 9 lengths from Promalee.

== 1999/00 Season ==
He made his seasonal reappearance in the Troytown Chase in November, where he finished third, before stepping back up to the top level for the John Durkan Memorial Chase. He was sent off the 4/1 second favourite and finished a 3/4 length second to Buck Rogers. Rince Ri resumed winning ways in his next start, where he beat favourite Florida Pearl by a head in the Ericsson Chase at Leopardstown. His next start saw him lock horns with that rival again, but Florida Pearl recorded victory in the Irish Hennessy Chase, where Rince Ri finished third. His final start of the season saw him go to the Cheltenham Festival for the first time, where he was sent off a 33/1 shot for the Cheltenham Gold Cup. He unseated his rider, Ruby Walsh, three out.

== 2000/01 Season ==
The 2000/01 season started with Rince Ri's second successive win in the Ericsson Chase before injury ruled him out for the rest of the season.

== 2001/02 Season ==
November 2001 saw Rince Ri return from injury at Naas, where he finished fourth behind Knife Edge. He filled the same position in his next two starts, in the John Durkan Memorial Chase and the Ericsson Chase. After finishing second in the Pierse Chase in January 2002, Rince Ri crossed the shores to Cheltenham, where he won the Pillar Chase. His next start proved to be the final one of that season, where he finished third behind Alexander Banquet in the Irish Hennessy Chase.

== 2002/03 Season ==
The 2002/03 season was one of mixed fortunes for Rince Ri, as he finished down the field in the John Durkan Memorial Chase, the Ericsson Chase, the Pierse Chase, and the Irish Hennessy Chase, before he went to Fairyhouse, where he won the Bobbyjo Chase in February. He followed that up with another win in a Listed race at Navan. In his final start of the season, Rince Ri finished second behind First Gold in the Punchestown Gold Cup.

== 2003/04 Season ==
The 2003/04 season saw Rince Ri placed in numerous Grade 1 races, without ever getting his head in front. He was placed in the John Durkan Memorial Chase, the Normans Grove Chase, the Pillar Chase, and the Irish Hennessy Chase, and he finished the season with a fourth behind Beef Or Salmon in the Punchestown Gold Cup.

He was registered for the 2004 Grand National, but was later pulled out.

== Final Two Seasons ==
His final two seasons saw Rince Ri run in a mixture of hurdle and chase races, including the Bobbyjo Chase and the 2006 Grand National, without getting his head in front again. After failing to finish in the 2006 Grand National, he was retired.
