= Don Cossack (horse) =

German-bred Thoroughbred racehorse

- Racing silks of W B Connors and Gigginstown House Stud
- Sire: Sholokhov
- Grandsire: Sadler's Wells
- Dam: Depeche Toi
- Damsire: Königsstuhl
- Sex: Gelding
- Foaled: 21 March 2007
- Country: Germany
- Colour: Brown
- Breeder: Gestut Etzean
- Owner: W B Connors; Gigginstown House Stud
- Trainer: Edward Hales; Gordon Elliott
- Record: 27: 16-4-2; 19:12-3-1 (Chases); 4:1-1-1 (Hurdles); 4:3-0-0 (Bumpers)
- Earnings: £907,365

Major wins
- Future Champ INH Flat Race (2011); Drinmore Novice Chase (2013); Daily Star Chase (2014, 2015); Powers Irish Whiskey Chase (2014); Punchestown Chase (2015); Kinloch Brae Chase (2015, 2016); Melling Chase (2015); Punchestown Gold Cup (2015); JNwine.com Champion Chase (2015); Cheltenham Gold Cup (2016)

Awards
- Top-rated National Hunt horse (2015, 2016); Irish Horse of the Year (2015)

Don Cossack (foaled 21 March 2007) is a retired German-bred, Irish-trained Thoroughbred racehorse who competed in National Hunt racing. Since his second race the gelding has been owned by the Gigginstown House Stud and trained in County Meath by Gordon Elliott. He was ridden by many leading jockeys including Nina Carberry, Davy Russell, Bryan Cooper, Barry Geraghty, A. P. McCoy and Paul Carberry.

Don Cossack showed promise in his early career, winning three National Hunt Flat races and a novice hurdle before being switched to steeplechasing in the autumn of 2013. In his first season over fences he won two races including the Drinmore Novice Chase and finished second in three other major novice events.

In the 2014/2015 National Hunt season he established himself as one of the best chasers in training by winning six of his seven races. He won the Daily Star Chase, Powers Irish Whiskey Chase, Punchestown Chase and Kinloch Brae Chase in Ireland before sustaining his only defeat of the season in the Ryanair Chase at Cheltenham. He produced his best form in spring by winning the Melling Chase and the Punchestown Gold Cup and ended the season as the highest-rated National Hunt performer in Britain and Ireland.

In the following season he won a second Daily Star Chase and then took the JNwine.com Champion Chase but fell when favourite for the King George VI Chase. He won a repeat victory in the Kinloch Brae Chase and then recorded his biggest win in the 2016 Cheltenham Gold Cup. He was rated the best National Hunt performer in Britain and Ireland for the second time in May 2016. He was retired from racing in January 2017 following a recurrence of a tendon injury which had prevented him from reappearing after his Gold Cup win.

== Background ==
Don Cossack is a brown gelding with a white blaze bred in Germany by the Gestűt Etzean. He was sired by Sholokhov, who won the Gran Criterium in 2001 and finished second in both the Irish Derby and the Eclipse Stakes in the following year. His other major winners have included the German Horse of the Year Night Magic and the leading French hurdler Esmondo. Don Cossack's dam Depeche Toi was a German mare who finished seventh in the 1994 Preis der Diana. She was a granddaughter of the 1972 Preis der Diana winner Diu, whose other descendants have included Animal Kingdom.

Don Cossack was sent to Ireland where he entered the ownership of W. B. Connors and was sent into training with Edward Hales at Dundrum, County Tipperary. After his first race he was bought by Michael O'Leary's Gigginstown House Stud and transferred to the stable of Gordon Elliott at Longwood, County Meath.

== Racing career ==
=== Early career ===
Don Cossack made his debut in a National Hunt Flat race at Punchestown Racecourse in April 2011 and finished fifth of the twenty-four runners behind King Vuvuzela. In the 2011/2012 season he was unbeaten in three National Hunt flat races, ridden on each occasion by Nina Carberry. After recording his first success at Naas Racecourse in October he was stepped up in class for a Grade Two event at Navan Racecourse in December and started favourite at odds of 4/6. He raced in second as the outsider Rory O'Moore opened up a lead which at one point stretched to over 100 yards, but made up the deficit in the straight, took the lead in the closing stages and won by one and a half lengths. On his final start of the season he won by seventeen lengths at Fairyhouse in April.

In the 2012/2013 season Don Cossack was campaigned in novice hurdle races, and ridden in all four of his races by Davy Russell. He was successful in his first appearance over obstacles when he won at Navan in November, coming home nine and a half lengths clear of his fourteen opponents at odds of 30/100. He again started odds-on favourite when moved up to Grade One class for the Navan Novice Hurdle in December, but looked beaten when he fell at the last hurdle. The gelding showed better form when he returned in February, finishing second to Mozoltov in the Moscow Flyer Novice Hurdle at Punchestown and third behind Annie Power and Defy Logic in the Johnstown Novice Hurdle at Naas.

=== 2013/2014 National Hunt Season: Novices' chases ===
In the 2013/2014 Don Cossack competed over larger obstacles as he ran in novice steeplechases. He made his first appearance over fences over two and three quarter miles on heavy ground at Galway in October. Ridden by Andrew Lynch he took the lead at the last and drew away to win by twenty lengths from Dressedtothenines. The gelding was ridden by Bryan Cooper when he started favourite for the Florida Pearl Novice Chase at Punchestown in November but after taking the lead at the second last he was caught on the run-in and beaten half a length by Morning Assembly. On 1 December, with Russell again in the saddle, Don Cossack started 13/8 favourite for the Grade One Drinmore Novice Chase at Fairyhouse. After being restrained in the early stages he moved up to jump the last in third before taking the lead on the run-in and winning from the Galway Plate winner Carlingford Lough and Road To Riches.

Don Cossack failed to win his remaining four races that season but produced several good efforts against top-class opposition. He was beaten four lengths into second place by the Willie Mullins-trained Ballycasey in the Dr P. J. Moriarty Novice Chase at Leopardstown Racecourse in February and was then sent to England for his first visit to the Cheltenham Festival. He started at odds of 11/1 for the RSA Chase and appeared to be going well when falling at the fourteenth fence of a race won by O'Faolains Boy. At Aintree Racecourse the following month he finished second to Holywell in the Mildmay Novices' Chase with Many Clouds fourth and O'Faolains Boy fifth. On his final appearance of the season he finished fourth behind Carlingford Lough, Ballycasey and the favoured Morning Assembly in the Growise Champion Novice Chase at Punchestown on 29 April.

=== 2014/2015 National Hunt Season: Steeplechases ===
Don Cossack made his debut against more experienced chasers in the Grade Three Daily Star Chase at Punchestown in October and won by five and a half lengths from the ten-year-old Loosen My Load. At Down Royal on 1 November he was matched against the Paul Nicholls-trained Wonderful Charm in the Grade Two Powers Irish Whiskey Chase over two and a half miles. Ridden by Cooper, he led from the start and increased his advantage over the last two fences to win by eight and a half lengths. In the John Durkan Memorial Punchestown Chase five weeks later he started second favourite behind the Mullins-trained Boston Bob, a winner of four Group One races including the Punchestown Gold Cup and the Melling Chase, with the previous Gold Cup winner Lord Windermere also in the field. Ridden by Brian O'Connell he took the lead when Baily Green and Rathlin fell at the eighth fence. Despite some jumping errors and interference from the two riderless horses he maintained his advantage and drew away after the last to win by four and a half lengths from Boston Bob, with Lord Windermere in third. Only three horses opposed Don Cossack in the Kinloch Brae Chase at Thurles Racecourse in January, but they included Champagne Fever who was made favourite. After racing in second, Don Cossack moved up to join Champagne Fever and was left clear when the favourite fell at the last. He came home forty-four length ahead of Texas Jack with another sixty-one lengths back to the outsider Smokey Joe Joe.

In March 2015, Don Cossack appeared for the second time at the Cheltenham Festival and started 5/2 favourite against fourteen opponents in the Grade One Ryanair Chase. He travelled well into the race but a jumping mistake approaching the final back straight made him lose couple of lengths and position on the leading horses. After quickly recovering and getting back into the race he was hampered at second-last fence but managed to stay on well up the hill to finish third behind Uxizandre and the mare Ma Filleule. On 10 April, Don Cossack was made 3/1 joint-favourite with Champagne Fever for the Melling Chase at Aintree, with the other contenders including Al Ferof, Cue Card and Sire de Grugy. Ridden by A. P. McCoy, who replaced the suspended Cooper, he tracked the leaders before overtaking Cue Card at the third last and quickly went clear. Despite being eased down by McCoy in the closing stages he won by twenty-six lengths from Cue Card with John's Spirit four and a half lengths back in third. Gordon Elliot commented "I said a couple of years ago he was the best horse I've trained. It didn't work out then, but he looks it now. AP said he just gallops and gallops. It will be the Gold Cup now."

Don Cossack ended his season at Punchestown on 29 April when he was moved up in distance and started 5/2 second favourite for the Punchestown Gold Cup over three miles and a furlong. Boston Bob and Cue Card were again among the opposition but his main threats seemed to be Djakadam (the 2/1 favourite) and Road To Riches who had finished second and third to Coneygree in the current season's Gold Cup. Bryan Cooper opted to ride Road To Riches, who had recorded Group One wins in the JNwine.com Champion Chase and the Lexus Chase, and so Don Cossack was partnered by Paul Carberry. Don Cossack was towards the rear of the field in the early stages before moving into contention at the third last. He took a narrow lead at the last and drew away on the run-in to win by seven lengths from Djakadam with Road To Riches six and a half lengths back in third. After the race Elliott commented "We wanted to find out if he stayed the trip or not at this stage of the season so we would know where we are going next year. He's always been the apple of my eye and this is one of the proudest days I’ve had training horses so far." The 41-year-old Carberry, who celebrated with a flying dismount said "To go to Cheltenham and Aintree and come here is hard to do, but this fellow has always been a serious horse".

=== 2015/2016 National Hunt Season: steeplechases ===
Don Cossack seasonal debut was highly anticipated having been rated the best staying chaser of the previous season by both the official and Timeform handicappers. He made a winning reappearance on 15 October 2015 in the same Grade 3 race he won last season without being asked for any serious efforts, although he faced an in-form adversary in Cailin Annamh who was bidding for a hat-trick having won a Grade 2 contest last time out. The facile victory earned him a spot on Racing Post's front cover edition of Friday, 16 October 2015 with the title The Don Dazzles, the nickname popular among his fans was also used by his trainer Gordon Eliot and journalists to describe him after winning 5 out of 6 races in the 2014/2015 season.

Two weeks later he won the Champion Chase at Down Royal in a small field which included the winner of this race in 2013 Roi Du Mee and the last year's runner-up Rocky Creek. He led four fences from home and was totally unextended to cross the line eight lengths clear of the duelling Rocky Creek and Roi Du Mee, who were separated by a neck. His connections later expressed their intention to target the King George at Kempton on Boxing Day followed by a tilt at the Cheltenham Gold Cup in March.

At the end of 2015 on Boxing Day Don Cossack competed in the King George VI Chase in a nine runners field. He started the 15/8 favourite but during the race had his supporters worried as he was losing positions and showing distress signals being inconvenienced by the fast pace set by the dual title holder Silviniaco Conti earlier on. However, approaching the final stages of the race he started to pick up and was gradually coming in contention when reaching the final home turn. At the second last fence Don Cossack left his two main rivals to battle it out as he took a heavy fall when he was just getting the better of the eventual winner Cue Card. Gordon Elliott said "I don´t know where we would have finished but it would definitely have been in the first three" Only 3 weeks later he was back on the racetrack to retain the Grade 2 Kinloch Brae Chase over two and half miles that he also won in 2015 and after a workmanlike performance on the soft ground, he finally got the best of his three rivals extending after the last fence to win by nine and half lengths.

On 18 March Don Cossack was made the 9/4 favourite for the Cheltenham Gold Cup. He was partnered by Cooper, who opted to ride the horse in preference to the owner's other runner Don Poli. Cue Card was the 5/2 second choice in the betting with Don Poli and Djakadam on 9/2 and Smad Place (Hennessy Gold Cup) on 10/1. The other four runners were Carlingford Lough, O'Faolains Boy, On His Own (runner-up in 2014) and Irish Cavalier. Smad Place and O'Faolains Boy made the running with Djakadam, Don Cossack and Cue Card close behind. Smad Place began to struggle approaching the third last where Cue Card fell. With O'Faolains Boy quickly fading from contention the race lay between Don Cossack and Djakadam on the turn into the straight. Don Cossack opened up a clear advantage at the second last and stayed on strongly to beat Djakadam by four and a half lengths. Don Poli was ten lengths back in third ahead of Carlingford Lough and Irish Cavalier. After the race Cooper said "Everything went perfect. I didn’t want to get him crowded and we got into a lovely jumping rhythm. I knew turning in that there was only one winner bar a fall. He could have gone round again. There were a lot of press around saying that I couldn’t get on with the horse and I think I’ve proved you all wrong now".

=== Injury and retirement ===
The gelding was being prepared for a run at the Punchestown festival when he sustained a serious tendon injury. He returned to training in the 2016/17 season with the Gold Cup as his objective. In January 2017 however Gordon Elliott that Don Cossack had suffered a recurrence of his leg injury and would be retired from racing. The trainer commented "It's a real sickener for Gigginstown, myself, Bryan Cooper and the whole yard... He's a horse of a lifetime and he owes us nothing. I said all season that if he had any sort of setback at all we would retire him straight away... A peaceful retirement awaits him out in Gigginstown."

== Assessment and honours ==
In May 2015, Don Cossack was rated the best chaser of the previous season. The official Anglo-Irish classification awarded him a 175 rating, ahead of the two times King George winner Silviniaco Conti (172), the novice Gold Cup winner Coneygree (172) and the other progressive novice JLT Chase winner Vautour (171).

On 7 December 2015 at the Horse Racing Ireland annual awards, Don Cossack was jointly awarded the title of Horse of the Year after tying in the vote with Faugheen. The other Irish contenders for the award were Gleneagles – winner of the English and Irish 2000 Guineas, Legatissimo – 1000 Guineas winner, Nichols Canyon – a top novice hurdler, winner of five Grade 1 hurdles and Un de Sceaux – easy winner of the Arkle Trophy Chase. Trainer Gordon Elliott was present at the ceremony along with jockey Bryan Cooper and owner Eddie O’Leary who represented Gigginstown House Stud.

In May 2016, Don Cossack was rated the best chaser season for the second year in succession, with an improved rating of 177.

== Pedigree ==
Pedigree of Don Cossack (GER), brown gelding, 2007
Sire Sholokhov (IRE) 1999	Sadler's Wells (USA); 1981	Northern Dancer	Nearctic
Sire Sholokhov (IRE) 1999	Sadler's Wells (USA); 1981	Northern Dancer	Natalma
Sire Sholokhov (IRE) 1999	Sadler's Wells (USA); 1981	Fairy Bridge	Bold Reason
Sire Sholokhov (IRE) 1999	Sadler's Wells (USA); 1981	Fairy Bridge	Special
Sire Sholokhov (IRE) 1999	La Meilleure (IRE); 1985	Lord Gayle	Sir Gaylord
Sire Sholokhov (IRE) 1999	La Meilleure (IRE); 1985	Lord Gayle	Sticky Case
Sire Sholokhov (IRE) 1999	La Meilleure (IRE); 1985	Gradille	Home Guard
Sire Sholokhov (IRE) 1999	La Meilleure (IRE); 1985	Gradille	Gradiva
Dam Depeche Toi (GER) 1991	Königsstuhl (GER); 1976	Dschingis Khan	Tamerlane
Dam Depeche Toi (GER) 1991	Königsstuhl (GER); 1976	Dschingis Khan	Donna Diana
Dam Depeche Toi (GER) 1991	Königsstuhl (GER); 1976	Königskronung	Tiepoletto
Dam Depeche Toi (GER) 1991	Königsstuhl (GER); 1976	Königskronung	Kronung
Dam Depeche Toi (GER) 1991	Diaspora (GB); 1977	Sparkler	Hard Tack
Dam Depeche Toi (GER) 1991	Diaspora (GB); 1977	Sparkler	Diamond Spur
Dam Depeche Toi (GER) 1991	Diaspora (GB); 1977	Diu	Utrillo
Dam Depeche Toi (GER) 1991	Diaspora (GB); 1977	Diu	Didergo (Family 1-h)
