= Cue Card (horse) =

BritishThoroughbred racehorse (2006–2022)

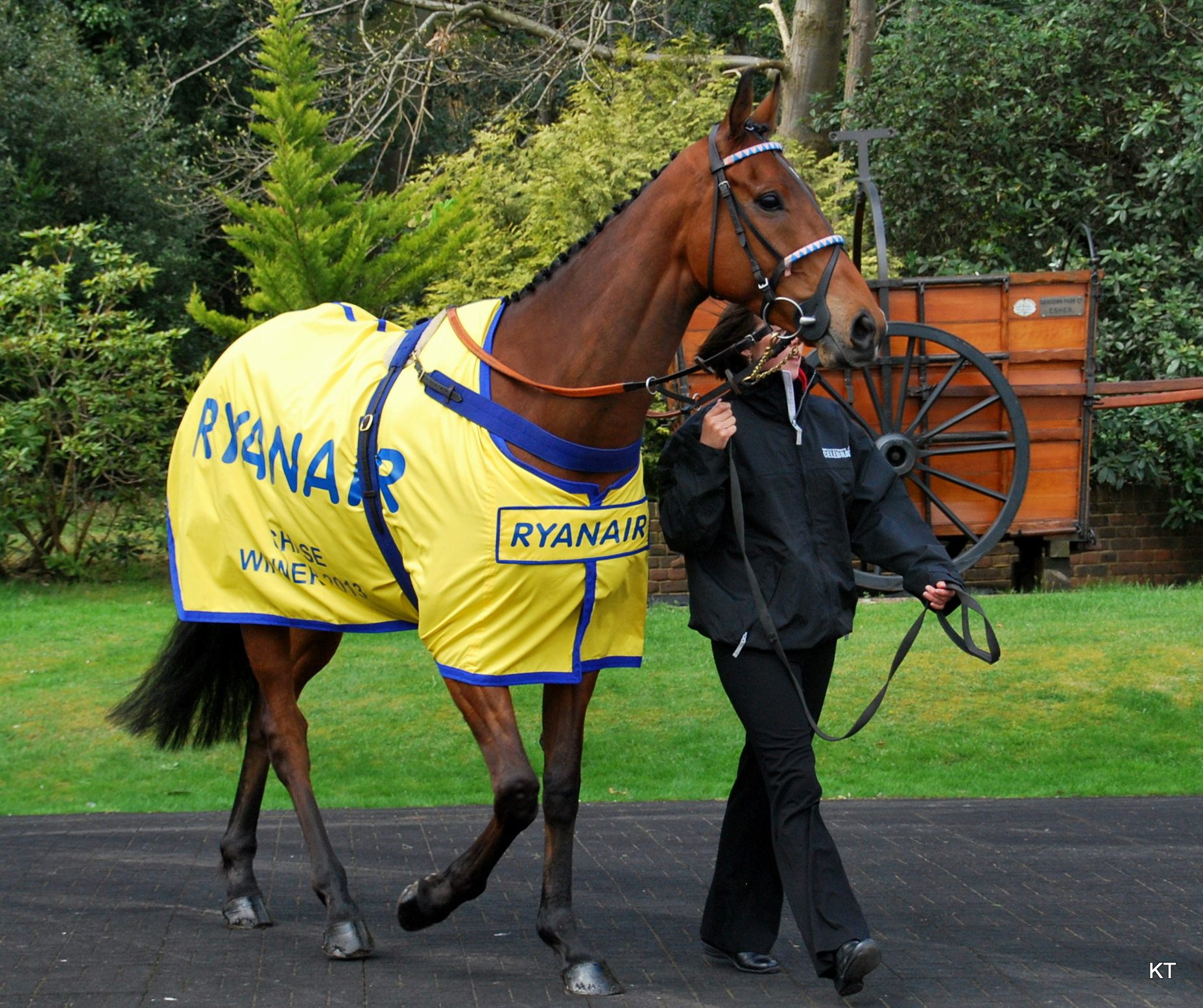
- Cue Card at Sandown in 2013
- Sire: King's Theatre
- Grandsire: Sadler's Wells
- Dam: Wicked Crack (IRE)
- Damsire: King's Ride (GB)
- Sex: Gelding
- Foaled: 30 April 2006
- Died: 23 December 2022 (aged 16)
- Country: Great Britain
- Colour: Bay
- Breeder: R T Crellin
- Owner: Mrs Jean R Bishop
- Trainer: Colin Tizzard
- Record: 33:15-7-2; 23: 10-5-1 (Chases); 5: 2-2-0 (Hurdles); 2: 2-0-0 (Bumpers)
- Earnings: £1,208,057

Major wins
- Champion Bumper (2010); Robert Mottram Memorial Trophy (2011); Haldon Gold Cup (2012); Ascot Chase (2013, 2017); Ryanair Chase (2013); Betfair Chase (2013, 2015, 2016); Charlie Hall Chase (2015); King George VI Chase (2015); Betfred Bowl (2016)
- Last updated on 7 April 2016

Cue Card (30 April 2006 – 23 December 2022) was a British Thoroughbred racehorse. A specialist steeplechaser, he won fifteen of his thirty-three races, including nine at Grade I level.

He was a leading performer in National Hunt flat races, winning the Champion Bumper at the Cheltenham Festival. He was less successful over hurdles but emerged as a top-class performer when tried over larger obstacles. He won the Haldon Gold Cup, Ascot Chase and Ryanair Chase in the 2012–13 National Hunt season and the Betfair Chase in the 2013–14 season.

He went through the 2014–15 campaign winless but after a wind-operation over the 2015 summer, he returned in the following season to record his second win in the Betfair Chase and won the King George VI Chase at the fourth attempt. He fell when in contention in the 2016 Cheltenham Gold Cup but returned to winning form with victory on his next start in the Betfred Bowl.

== Background ==
Cue Card was a bay gelding with a white star bred by Roland Crellin at Brookfarm, Penhow. He was one of many successful National Hunt horses sired by the King George VI and Queen Elizabeth Stakes winner King's Theatre.

As a yearling, Cue Card was sent to the sales in February 2007 and was bought for €75,000 by Aiden Murphy. He returned to the sales as a gelding in June 2009, and was sold to Aidan Kennedy for €52,000.

Cue Card was trained by Colin Tizzard at Milborne Port in Dorset and owned by Mrs Jean Bishop. He had been ridden in all of his races to date by his trainer's son Joe Tizzard but, following Tizzard's decision to retire in 2014, Daryl Jacob took over in the saddle for the 2014–2015 National Hunt Season. From the 2015–2016 seasons onwards he had been partnered by Paddy Brennan.

== Racing career ==
=== National Hunt flat races ===
Cue Card began his racing career in National Hunt Flat races, or "bumpers". After winning on his debut at Fontwell Park Racecourse in February 2010, he was sent to the Cheltenham Festival to contest the Grade One Champion Bumper. He started a 40/1 outsider, but won easily by eight lengths from Al Ferof.

=== Hurdles ===
In the following season, Cue Card campaigned in Novice hurdle races and won two of his five races including the Grade II Sharp Novices' Hurdle at Cheltenham. At the Cheltenham Festival he started 7/4 favourite for the Supreme Novices' Hurdle but finished fourth behind Al Ferof, Spirit Son and Sprinter Sacre.

=== Steeplechases ===
==== 2011–12 season ====
In the 2011–12 season, Cue Card raced in Novice chases. His two wins of the season came at Chepstow Racecourse in October, and at Newbury Racecourse in December when he won the Halloe'en Trophy by four lengths. He was beaten a short head when attempting to concede seven pounds to Bobs Worth in the Berkshire Novices' Chase and finished second to Sprinter Sacre in the Arkle Challenge Trophy.

==== 2012–13 season ====
Cue Card began his next season in the Grade II Haldon Gold Cup at Exeter Racecourse. Competing against more experienced chasers he started the 5/6 favourite and won impressively by twenty-six lengths. He was then moved up in class and distance for the King George VI Chase at Kempton Park Racecourse on Boxing Day, but after making mistakes at the first two fences he tired in the closing stages and finished fifth behind Long Run. In February, Cue Card won the Grade I Ascot Chase, beating Captain Chris by six lengths: he led for most of the race and was never in danger of defeat after the runner-up made a "terrible blunder" at the final fence. At the Cheltenham Festival, Tizzard opted to run Cue Card in the two and a half mile Ryanair Chase, rather than taking on Sprinter Sacre in the two mile Queen Mother Champion Chase. Starting at odds of 7/2, Cue Card led from the start and won by nine lengths from the Irish-trained favourite First Lieutenant. On his final appearance of the season, Cue Card finished four and a half lengths second to Sprinter Sacre in the Melling Chase at Aintree.

==== 2013–14 season ====
On Cue Card's first appearance of the new season he was made odd-on favourite to repeat his 2012 win in the Haldon Gold Cup. Carrying top weight of 164 pounds he finished third behind Somersby, a Grade I winner who was carrying 147. On 23 November, Cue Card contested an exceptionally strong renewal of the Betfair Chase at Haydock Park and started at odds of 9/1 against a field which included Bobs Worth, Long Run, Tidal Bay and Silviniaco Conti. He took the lead at the fourth fence and was never headed, turning back the challenges of Silviniaco Conti and Dynaste before drawing away in the final stages to win by four and a half lengths. After the race, Joe Tizzard called the winner "a real Gold Cup horse", while a visibly emotional Colin Tizzard said "Cue Card jumped better than he ever has. He was on his game today, that's for sure." Cue Card started 100/30 joint-favourite with Dynaste for the King George VI Chase in which he led from the start and looked the likely winner when going clear of the field entering the straight. After jumping the second last fence he began to tire and was overtaken by Silviniaco Conti, finishing second by three and a half lengths.

Cue Card was aimed at the Cheltenham Festival with the Gold Cup, Ryanair Chase and Champion Chase being considered as possible targets. On 25 February, Colin Tizzard announced that the gelding appeared to have sustained a muscle injury to his back and would miss Cheltenham. Subsequent x-ray examinations revealed that the gelding had in fact sustained a stress fracture to his pelvis, ruling him out for the rest of the season.

==== 2014–15 season ====
Cue Card returned for the 2014–15 season but failed to win in five races. On his return after his long absence he finished fourth when favourite for the Haldon Gold Cup and then finished behind Silviniaco Conti in both the Lancashire Chase and the King George VI Chase. He missed the 2015 Cheltenham Festival but returned in April for the Melling Chase. After leading until the third last he had no chance with the winner Don Cossack but stayed on well in the closing stages to hold on to second place. On his final appearance of the season he was sent to Ireland for the first time and finished fourth behind Don Cossack in the Punchestown Gold Cup.

==== 2015–16 season ====
On 31 October 2015, Cue Card made his seasonal reappearance in the Grade 2 Charlie Hall Chase with his trainer Colin Tizzard reporting he had solved the problems with a trapped epiglottis of which Cue Card suffered in the previous season, and duly obliged by returning to winning ways first time in almost two years winning by three and three-quarter lengths from a smart performer in Dynaste. He followed up three weeks later with winning the first step of the Stayers Chase Triple Crown and at the same time regaining the Betfair Chase from the last year winner Silviniaco Conti which had set a solid pace but faltered on the run-in with Cue Card finishing 7 lengths in front of him at the line. On Boxing Day 2015 Cue Card continued his improved form of the season and displayed a career best performance to take the King George VI Chase where a strong field was assembled, representing almost all form lines of the early season in staying graded races, including the winner of the Hennessy Gold Cup. Cue Card settled in the middle of the pack for most part of the race and only started to make ground on the front-runner Vautour —one of the leading novice chasers of the last season— in the back straight with the latter setting up a solid pace upfront. The two were left clear by the second last fence at which the favourite Don Cossack fell and an exciting battle began after the last with Cue Card catching Vautour with every stride. The pair finished in a photo finish and Cue Card was soon announced as the winner of the 65th King George VI Chase.

His next race was after a three months break being sent straight for the Cheltenham Gold Cup in which he was bidding for the Stayers Chase Triple Crown £1 million bonus. He started the 5/2 second favourite behind Don Cossack, in a field which also included the 2014 and 2015 Gold Cup runners-up Djakadam and On His Own and also the 2015 Hennessy Gold Cup winner, Smad Place. In the race he travelled comfortably and was kept in touch of the leaders who were going a strong pace upfront. He was still in contention at third fence from home when he made a jumping error and took a heavy fall. Cue Card bounced back in the Betfred Bowl Chase at Aintree a few weeks later when going off the odds on favourite, he was an impressive winner with Don Poli in second and Djakadam in third. His last appearance of the season came at Punchestown three weeks later on 27 April when again he was the odds on favourite. However, he could only manage fourth place to Carlingford Lough who won the Punchestown Gold Cup at 12/1.

==== 2016–17 season ====
On 29 October 2016, Cue Card made his seasonal debut in the Charlie Hall Chase at Wetherby and was sent off the odds on favourite. Disappointingly, he was only third to Irish Cavalier who won at 16/1. Cue Card's second reappearance was in the Betfair Chase at Haydock on 19 November when he beat Coneygree by an impressive 15 lengths. His next outing was to try and defend his crown at Kempton for the King George. However, Thistlecrack who was still a novice was far too good for him on the day. Cue Card had one more race before the Gold Cup and that was in the Betfair Ascot Chase when he was sent off the 4/9 favourite. It was a dominant performance and the winning margin was 15 lengths. In the 2017 Gold Cup, Cue Card was the 9/2 third favourite but unfortunately Cue Card fell three out in a repeat from the previous year. The commentator remarked that he was not going as well as the year before. His final appearance of the season was in the Betway Bowl Chase at Aintree. Starting as the 2/1 favourite Cue Card was narrowly held by Teafortwo.

==== 2017–18 season ====
On 15 March 2018, Cue Card was pulled up in the Ryanair Chase at the Cheltenham Festival. Trainer Colin Tizzard said that there would be no immediate decision of whether the horse would now be retired.

== Death ==
Cue Card died following a heart attack on 23 December 2022, at the age of 16.

== Pedigree ==
Pedigree of Cue Card, bay gelding, 2006
Sire King's Theatre (IRE) 1991	Sadler's Wells (USA); 1981	Northern Dancer	Nearctic
Sire King's Theatre (IRE) 1991	Sadler's Wells (USA); 1981	Northern Dancer	Natalma
Sire King's Theatre (IRE) 1991	Sadler's Wells (USA); 1981	Fairy Bridge	Bold Reason
Sire King's Theatre (IRE) 1991	Sadler's Wells (USA); 1981	Fairy Bridge	Special
Sire King's Theatre (IRE) 1991	Regal Beauty (USA); 1981	Princely Native	Raise a Native
Sire King's Theatre (IRE) 1991	Regal Beauty (USA); 1981	Princely Native	Charlo
Sire King's Theatre (IRE) 1991	Regal Beauty (USA); 1981	Dennis Belle	Crafty Admiral
Sire King's Theatre (IRE) 1991	Regal Beauty (USA); 1981	Dennis Belle	Evasion
Dam Wicked Crack (IRE) 1993	Kings Ride (IRE); 1976	Rarity	Hethersett
Dam Wicked Crack (IRE) 1993	Kings Ride (IRE); 1976	Rarity	Who Can Tell
Dam Wicked Crack (IRE) 1993	Kings Ride (IRE); 1976	Ride	Sovereign Path
Dam Wicked Crack (IRE) 1993	Kings Ride (IRE); 1976	Ride	Turf
Dam Wicked Crack (IRE) 1993	Mighty Crack (IRE); 1979	Deep Run	Pampered King
Dam Wicked Crack (IRE) 1993	Mighty Crack (IRE); 1979	Deep Run	Trial By Fire
Dam Wicked Crack (IRE) 1993	Mighty Crack (IRE); 1979	Treize	Thirteen of Diamonds
Dam Wicked Crack (IRE) 1993	Mighty Crack (IRE); 1979	Treize	Clear Bay (Family 21-a)
