= Silviniaco Conti =

French racehorse

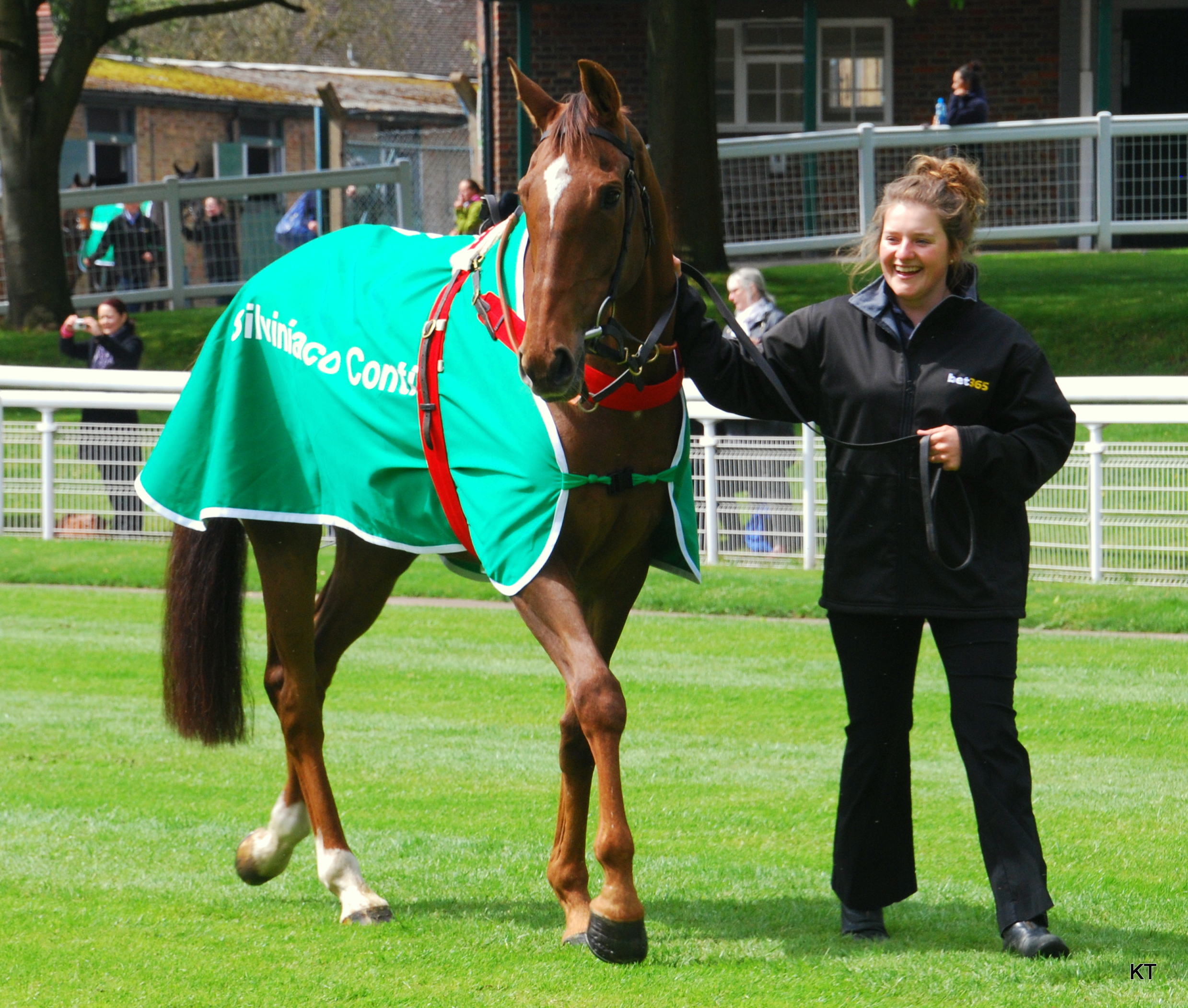
- Silviniaco Conti at Sandown in April 2014.
- Sire: Dom Alco
- Grandsire: Dom Pasquini
- Dam: Gazelle Lulu
- Damsire: Altayan
- Sex: Gelding
- Foaled: 14 April 2006
- Country: France
- Colour: Chestnut
- Breeder: Patrick Joubert
- Owner: Patrick Joubert & P Boulard; Potensis Limited; Chris Giles
- Trainer: Guillaume Macaire; Paul Nicholls
- Record: 36: 16-4-5; 28: 11-3-4 (Chases); 8: 5-1-1 (Hurdles)
- Earnings: £1,151,609

Major wins
- Persian War Novices' Hurdle (2010); Ascot Hurdle (2010); Rising Stars Novices' Chase (2011); Mildmay Novices' Chase (2012); Charlie Hall Chase (2012); Lancashire Chase (2012, 2014); Denman Chase (2013); King George VI Chase (2013, 2014); Betfred Bowl (2014, 2015); Ascot Chase (2016)

Awards
- Top-rated Anglo-Irish jumper (2014)

Honours
- Silviniaco Conti Chase at Kempton Park Racecourse

Silviniaco Conti (14 April 2006 – 9 April 2018) was a French-bred, British-trained Selle Français racehorse who competed in National Hunt races. After winning several important races over hurdles he emerged as a leading long-distance steeplechaser in 2012. After winning both his races in his native country, the horse won his first three races in England, culminating with a success in the two and a half mile Ascot Hurdle. After running poorly over shorter distances he was ruled out of a bid for the Champion Hurdle and was switched to steeplechasing. In his first season as a chaser he won the Mildmay Novices' Chase and finished second in a strong renewal of the Feltham Chase. In the 2012/2013 season he won the Charlie Hall Chase, Betfair Chase and Denman Chase and in the following season he was rated the best jumper in Britain and Ireland after wins in the King George VI Chase and Betfred Bowl. In the 2014/2015 season he recorded repeat victories in the Betfair Chase, King George VI Chase and Betfred Bowl but failed when favourite for the Cheltenham Gold Cup. In the following season he was beaten in his first three races but returned to form in February to win the Grade One Ascot Chase by 20 lengths.

== Background ==
Silviniaco Conti is a chestnut gelding with a diamond-shaped white star and white socks on his hind legs bred in France by Patrick Joubert. He was sired by Dom Alco (1987–2010) a French Thoroughbred hurdler whose other progeny include Neptune Collonges (Grand National), Al Ferof (Supreme Novices' Hurdle) and Grand Crus (Feltham Novices' Chase). His dam Gazelle Lulu was a Selle Français mare who has also produced the successful French jumpers Ucello Conti and Toscana Conti. Silviniaco Conti was originally sent into training with Guillaume Macaire in France.

== Racing career ==
=== 2010–2011: hurdle races ===
Silviniaco Conti began his racing career as a four-year-old in France in the spring of 2010, winning hurdle races at Senonnes-Pouance and Nancy. Later that year he was transferred to the United Kingdom where he joined the stable of Paul Nicholls at Ditcheat in Somerset for the 2010/2011 National Hunt season.

On his first start for his new trainer, Silviniaco Conti won a ten-runner Novice's hurdle at Bangor-on-Dee Racecourse in October by twenty-nine lengths. Two weeks later, the gelding was moved up in class for the Grade 2 Persian War Novices' Hurdle over two and a half miles at Chepstow Racecourse. Ridden by Noel Fehily, Silviniaco Conti took the lead three hurdles from the finish and won by ten lengths from Captain Chris in "impressive" fashion. In the Grade 1 Ascot Hurdle in November, the gelding was matched against more experienced rivals including Zaynar, who had finished third in that year's Champion Hurdle. Silviniaco Conti went clear of his opponents at the second last hurdle and won by seven lengths from Karadak and Restless Harry. His performance led to him being offered at odds of only 10/1 for the 2011 Champion Hurdle and for his next two starts he race over shorter distances in two major championship trials. In December his unbeaten run came to an end as he finished third behind Menorah and Cue Card in the International Hurdle over the Champion Hurdle course at Cheltenham. In February he started favourite for the Kingwell Hurdle at Wincanton, but finished fourth of the five runners behind Mille Chief.

=== 2011/2012 National Hunt season ===
Silviniaco Conti was campaigned in novice steeplechases in the 2011/2012 season, beginning with a third place behind Cue Card at Chepstow in October. In the Grade 2 Rising Stars Chase at Wincanton in November, he recorded his first victory in a steeplechase, as he started the 8/11 favourite and won by twenty-five lengths from Mad Moose. In the Grade 1 Feltham Novices Chase at Kempton Park on Boxing Day he finished second behind the favourite Grand Crus, with Bobs Worth in third place. For the second year in succession, Silviniaco Conti ran poorly in what was intended to be his final trial race for the Cheltenham Festival. At Ascot Racecourse in February he started 11/10 favourite for the Reynoldstown Novices' Chase, but finished fourth of the seven runners ten lengths behind the winner Invictus. Silviniaco Conti missed the Cheltenham Festival, reappearing at Aintree Racecourse in April where he contested the Grade 2 Mildmay Novices' Chase. Ridden by Ruby Walsh he started 7/4 favourite and won by thirteen lengths from Champion Court.

=== 2012/2013 National Hunt season ===
The 2012/2003 National Hunt season saw Silviniaco Conti racing against more experienced steeplechasers. In November he began his season by winning the Grade 2 Charlie Hall Chase at Wetherby by eleven lengths from Wayward Prince. Three weeks later in the Grade 1 Lancashire Chase at Haydock Park he was pitted against Long Run, the winner of the 2011 Cheltenham Gold Cup at level weights. Walsh sent the six-year-old into the lead from the start and in the closing stages he held off the sustained challenge of Long Run to win by two and a half lengths. After the race, which established the winner as a leading contender for the 2013 Cheltenham Gold Cup, Nicholls compared the horse to Kauto Star, who had won the same race as a six-year-old in 2006.

Silviniaco Conti's final warm-up for Cheltenham came in the Denman Chase at Newbury Racecourse in February. Walsh sent the gelding into the lead two fences from the finish and he drew clear to win by seven lengths from the 2012 Gold Cup runner-up The Giant Bolster. Walsh called the winner "a gem" while echoing Nicholls' view that the horse was less than fully fit and would improve for the race. In the Cheltenham Gold Cup on 15 March, Silviniaco Conti started third favourite behind Bobs Worth and Long Run. He was just behind the leaders and apparently going well when he fell three fences from the finish. On his final appearance of the season, the gelding started even money favourite for the Betfred Bowl at Aintree but finished third behind First Lieutenant and Menorah.

=== 2013/2014 National Hunt season ===
Silviniaco Conti began the season in the Betfair Chase, in which he was ridden for the first time since 2010 by Noel Fehily. Starting the 7/2 second favourite he finished third behind Cue Card and Dynaste in a very strong field which also included Bobs Worth, Long Run and Tidal Bay. He faced Cue Card, Dynaste and Long Run again in the King George VI Chase over three miles at Kempton Park Racecourse on 26 December 2013. Cue Card led from the start, as at Haydock, but Silviniaco Conti, again ridden by Fehily, tracked the leader closely before taking the lead after the second-last fence. He jumped the last well and stayed on to win by three and a half lengths from Cue Card, with Al Ferof eleven lengths back in third. Paul Nicholls, who was winning the race for the eighth time, explained that the horse had been less than fully fit at Haydock and said: "all he does is stay. This was always the target this year. You have to be a true stayer to win this".

On 14 March, Siviniaco Conti, ridden by Noel Fehily, started 11/4 second favourite behind Bobs Worth in the 2014 Cheltenham Gold Cup. He was toward the rear of the field in the early stages, but made steady progress to take the lead after the fourth last. He held the lead over the final fence and repelled the challenge of Bobs Worth, but was overtaken by a trio of outsiders on the run-in and finished fourth behind Lord Windermere, On His Own and The Giant Bolster. On 3 April Silviniaco Conti ran in the Betfred Bowl at Aintree. He beat Dynaste by a length and a half with Argocat in third. It was a good effort by Silviniaco Conti coming less than a month after his Gold Cup fourth; despite once more wandering when tired as he did in the Gold Cup, Conti showed good resolve and attitude to fend off Dynaste on the run in. Shortly after the race a gastroscopy revealed that the horse was suffering from severe stomach ulcers.

In May 2014 the official Anglo-Irish classifications rated Silviniaco Conti the best jumper of the season with a rating of 174, two pounds ahead of Cue Card and Sire de Grugy.

=== 2014/2015 National Hunt season ===
Silviniaco Conti began the 2014/15 season in the Charlie Hall Chase at Wetherby on 1 November. He started favourite and led for most of the way before fading over the last two fences and finishing fifth behind Menorah. He then went on to contest the Betfair Chase on 22 November wearing sheepskin cheekpieces for the first time. He settled well in the early stages and jumped quickly; moving alongside the previous year's winner Cue Card turning for home, Conti produced a big leap at four out to send him into the lead. He jumped the last up-sides the challenging Menorah, but Conti dug in up the run in and stayed on to beat Menorah by two lengths. Nicholls commented "That's two Betfairs and a King George and my mission now is to get him in the form of his life for the Gold Cup. If he’d been right last year we might have had a different result, but he wasn’t and he didn’t but I’m convinced Cheltenham won’t be a problem for him". On 26 December Silviniaco Conti attempted to repeat his 2013 success in the King George VI Chase. On a gloomy, overcast day which saw the race run in near darkness the gelding started the 15/8 favourite in a field of ten runner which included Champagne Fever, Al Ferof, Cue Card, Menorah and Dynaste. Silviniaco Conti set the pace from Champagne Fever and jumped well throughout the race. Fehily gradually increased the pace before sending the favourite for home exiting the final turn. Silviniaco Conti increased his advantage in the straight and won by four and a half lengths from Dynaste, with Al Ferof finishing well to deprive Champagne Fever of third place in the final strides. After the race, Nicholls said "I knew he was in a good place and the cheekpieces have turned him inside out. I don’t know what they do or why, but they wake up lazy horses... This horse is a better horse than he was a year ago. The plan was to serve it up to the others, it's the only way to win with him, and Noel said he had never have been able to make the running like that without cheekpieces".

Silviniaco Conti did not race again until March, when he made his third attempt to win the Cheltenham Gold Cup and started 3/1 favourite in a sixteen-runner field. After settling behind the leaders and moved up to dispute third place at the fourth last but than began to struggle and finished seventh, twenty-seven lengths behind the winner Coneygree. Nicholls felt that the gelding had been unsuited by the rain-softened ground and the undulating course. As in the previous season Silviniaco Conti appeared in the Betfred Bowl at Aintree and started 7/4 favourite ahead of Holywell (Mildmay Novices' Chase, fourth in the Gold Cup), the mare Ma Filleule and Menorah. He led from the start and held off a late challenge from the 18/1 outsider Ballynagour to win by a head.

=== 2015/2016 National Hunt season ===
Silviniaco Conti made his seasonal reappearance on 2 November in the Pertemps Network Handicap Hurdle over 2 mile 5 furlongs at Kempton Park. He started at 7/2 in the betting and finished second, beaten four lengths by the favourite, Brother Tedd. Silviniaco Conti ran second for most of the race, was overtaken coming into the straight but came back to take second place by a nose. Paul Nicholls was pleased with the run, saying "He's done the job we wanted. He had a really good blow and he'll come on a lot from this. Noel said he galloped all the way to the line, just what we had wanted.". Three weeks later Silviniaco Conti had his first start over fences of the season in the Betfair Chase, where after making most of the running and an error-free jumping round he was eventually challenged by his old rival Cue Card but couldn't find any more in the home straight finishing 7 lengths in the second place, which took his career winnings past the £1 million mark. A month later he attempted to win a third consecutive King George VI Chase but after setting the pace for the first and half circuit he began to drop off tamely, eventually being pulled out. Paul Nicholls later revealed "We've had problems with him this year and I think he's probably just gone a bit soft... I think the Grand National is a good plan".

Silviniaco Conti was not entered in the 2016 Cheltenham Gold Cup but was assigned a weight of 162 pounds for the Grand National. On 20 February Siviniaco Conti contested the Grade 1 Ascot Chase over 2 miles five furlongs and was made the 2/1 favourite against seven opponents including Dynaste, Flemenstar and Triolo d'Alene. After tracking the leader Royal Regatta until the second last fence, Fehily sent the favourite into the lead and Silviniaco Conti drew well clear to win by twenty lengths. After the race Nicholls said "The Grand National is a definite possibility. It is highly likely he could run. He is going to be arguably well in now and Noel is keen on it". Silviniaco Conti ran in the 2016 Grand National but was struck into by the eventual winner, Rule the World, and was pulled up before the 14th fence.

=== 2016/2017 National Hunt season ===
Silviniaco Conti made his seasonal reappearance in the Grade 1 JNwine.com Champion Chase, he made most of the running and finished an honourable 2nd behind the Henry de Bromhead trained Valseur Lido. He then ran in the 2016 Betfair Chase at Haydock Park but finished a weary 4th behind the Colin Tizzard trained Cue Card. Due to the small field, Paul Nicholls decided to give Conti a chance of winning his 3rd King George VI Chase in December 2016. Despite being outpaced turning for home, Silviniaco Conti plugged on gamely to come a gallant 3rd behind the impressive winner Thistlecrack, just a short head behind Cue Card in 2nd. He was retired on 6 April 2017 after the Betway Bowl at Aintree.

== Retirement and death ==
Silviniaco Conti was retired from racing and joined Charlotte Alexander's stable near Stow-on-the-Wold where he took part in team chasing. On 8 April 2018 the gelding was injured in a team chase. Although his initial prognosis was promising, Silviniaco Conti died a day later at the age of twelve.

== Pedigree ==
Pedigree of Silviniaco Conti (FR), chestnut gelding, 2006
Sire Dom Alco (FR) 1987	Dom Pasquini (FR); 1980	Rheffic	Traffic
Sire Dom Alco (FR) 1987	Dom Pasquini (FR); 1980	Rheffic	Rhenane
Sire Dom Alco (FR) 1987	Dom Pasquini (FR); 1980	Boursonne	La Varende
Sire Dom Alco (FR) 1987	Dom Pasquini (FR); 1980	Boursonne	Arctic Star
Sire Dom Alco (FR) 1987	Alconaca (IRE); 1978	Nonoalco	Nearctic
Sire Dom Alco (FR) 1987	Alconaca (IRE); 1978	Nonoalco	Seximee
Sire Dom Alco (FR) 1987	Alconaca (IRE); 1978	Vela	Sheshoon
Sire Dom Alco (FR) 1987	Alconaca (IRE); 1978	Vela	Cenerentola
Dam Gazelle Lulu (FR) 1994	Altayan (IRE); 1983	Posse	Forli
Dam Gazelle Lulu (FR) 1994	Altayan (IRE); 1983	Posse	In Hot Pursuit
Dam Gazelle Lulu (FR) 1994	Altayan (IRE); 1983	Aleema	Red God
Dam Gazelle Lulu (FR) 1994	Altayan (IRE); 1983	Aleema	Alannya
Dam Gazelle Lulu (FR) 1994	Tatiana Lulu (FR); 1985	Quart de Vin	Devon
Dam Gazelle Lulu (FR) 1994	Tatiana Lulu (FR); 1985	Quart de Vin	Quartelette
Dam Gazelle Lulu (FR) 1994	Tatiana Lulu (FR); 1985	Kaline Lulu	Vieux Chateau
Dam Gazelle Lulu (FR) 1994	Tatiana Lulu (FR); 1985	Kaline Lulu	Violine D P (Selle Français)
