= Kauto Star =

French-bred Thoroughbred National Hunt racehorse (2000–2015)

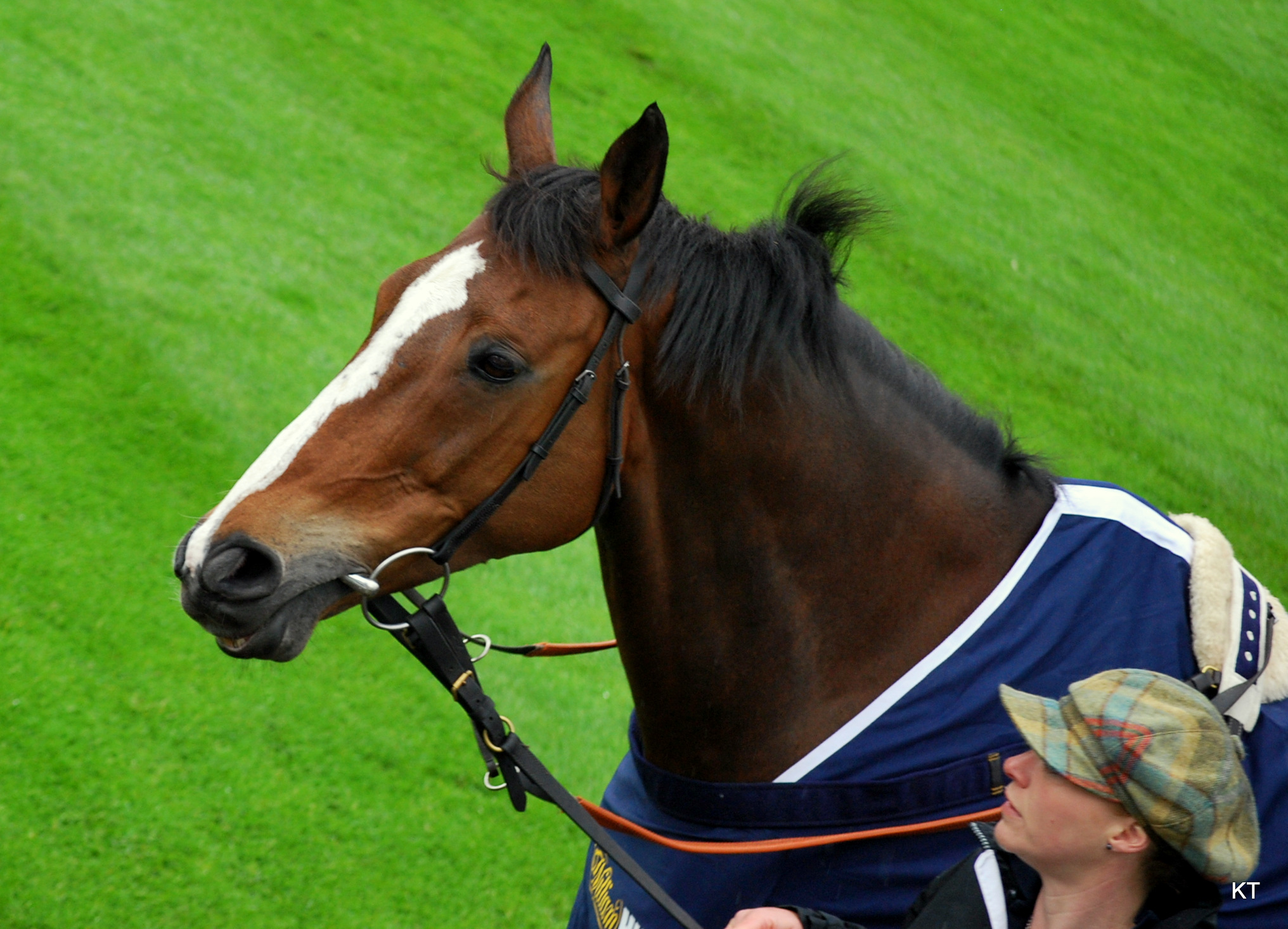
- Kauto Star in April 2012 at Sandown.
- Sire: Village Star
- Grandsire: Moulin
- Dam: Kauto Relka
- Damsire: Port Etienne
- Sex: Gelding
- Foaled: 19 March 2000
- Died: 29 June 2015 (aged 15)
- Country: France
- Colour: Bay
- Breeder: Mrs Henri Aubert
- Owner: Clive D. Smith
- Trainer: Serge Foucher; Paul Nicholls
- Record: 41: 23-7-4
- Earnings: £3,775,883

Major wins
- Tingle Creek Chase (2005, 2006); Old Roan Chase (2006); Betfair Chase (2006, 2007, 2009, 2011); King George VI Chase (2006, 2007, 2008, 2009, 2011); Aon Chase (2007); Cheltenham Gold Cup (2007, 2009); Ascot Chase (2008); JNwine.com Champion Chase (2008, 2010)

Awards
- Stayers Chase Triple Crown (2006/07); National Hunt Order of Merit (2006/07, 2007/08); Top rated steeplechase horse (2006/07, 2008/9, 2009/10, 2011/12); Timeform rating: 191
- Last updated on 16 March 2024

Kauto Star (19 March 2000 – 29 June 2015) was a French-bred National Hunt champion thoroughbred racehorse trained by Paul Nicholls in Somerset and owned by Clive Smith. He was known for his versatility and longevity, being the only horse ever to be top rated over 2 miles, 2.5 miles and 3 miles in the same season. He is also the first horse ever to win a Grade 1 race in six consecutive seasons, which he extended to seven. His Racing Post rating of 192 is the highest ever awarded to a National Hunt horse since those ratings began in 1987. He won the Cheltenham Gold Cup twice, in 2007 and 2009, becoming the first horse to regain the cup. In 2009, he beat Denman by thirteen lengths, after losing to the same horse by seven lengths the previous year. Kauto Star tried for three more years to win the race again, but the best placing he could achieve was third in 2011. He also won the King George VI Chase a record five times. Kauto Star was one of the most successful steeplechasers of any era: he finished his career with a National Hunt record of £3,775,883 in earnings, £2,375,883 of which was winner's prize money, a £1,000,000 bonus for the completion of the 2006/2007 Stayers Chase Triple Crown and a £400,000 reward for heading the BHA Table of Merit in the 2006/2007 season.

== Breeding ==
Kauto Star was foaled on 19 March 2000 and was bred by Mrs Henri Aubert. His sire was the Grand Prix de Saint-Cloud winner Village Star and his dam was Kauto Relka, who was a daughter of Port Etienne. Kauto Star is a half-brother to Kauto Stone, second in the 2011 Tingle Creek Chase, and Kauto Grand Mogol, who made his debut in 2012.

== Racing career ==
=== Early career ===
Kauto Star was initially trained in France by Serge Foucher at Senoble in the Mayenne region. He made his debut in a hurdles race at Bordeaux Le Bouscat Racecourse in France in March 2003, where he finished second. He started in two more hurdles races that season and won both. During the 2003/04 season, he raced over hurdles at Auteuil seven times and won twice. His last race of the season was the grade 3 Prix de Longchamp, which he won by 8 lengths. In France, he became known as 'L'Extraterrestre' (which translates to 'The Extraterrestrial')

Kauto Star first came to the attention of Paul Nicholls when he saw a video of him in action at Auteuil. Nicholls then sought to arrange a purchase through his bloodstock agent in France, Anthony Bromley. Nicholls arranged an owner in the shape of Clive Smith, who was looking to purchase a horse and had recently had a 500,000 guineas offer for another horse (Garde Champetre) outbid by J. P. McManus. He used 400,000 euro to purchase Kauto Star from his French owners.

Kauto Star moved to England for the 2004/05 season, and his first start of the season came in a class 3 novice chase race at Newbury, which he won easily by 9 lengths from Foreman, who went on to win the Maghull Novices' Chase the following season. His next start came in a class 3 novices' chase at Exeter. He started the 2/11 favourite in a field of three horses. Kauto Star took the lead after the eighth fence. He fell at the second to last fence when he had a 12 length lead. He was passed by Mistral De La Cour, but Kauto Star's jockey Ruby Walsh then re-mounted without his stirrups and chased the leader. He then hit the last fence, but still rapidly closed in on the finishing straight and lost out to Mistral De La Cour by a short-head. After the race, it was discovered that Kauto Star had sustained a fractured hock in the race, which ruled him out of the Cheltenham Festival and the rest of the season.

=== 2005/06 season ===
Kauto Star started the 2005/06 season in the Haldon Gold Cup at Exeter, where he finished in second place, four lengths behind Monkerhostin. He then started the 5/2 joint favourite for the Tingle Creek Chase. The previous season's Maghull Novices' Chase winner, Ashley Brook, was also at 5/2 and his Exeter conqueror, Monkerhostin, was at 9/2. Kauto Star went into the lead with three fences still to jump and held off Ashley Brook by 1 1/2 lengths. After this victory, he was sent off as the 2/1 favourite for the Queen Mother Champion Chase at the Cheltenham Festival in a field that included Moscow Flyer. Kauto Star fell at the third fence, and Newmill won the race.

=== 2006/07 season ===
Kauto Star started the 2006/07 season by easily winning the Old Roan Chase by 21 lengths from Armaturk. He next ran in the Betfair Chase, his first race over three miles. He took the lead at the last fence and drew clear to win by 17 lengths from multiple Grade 1 winner Beef Or Salmon. Two weeks later, he returned to racing over two miles in the Tingle Creek Chase. After taking the lead with three fences left to jump, he again pulled clear to easily win by 7 lengths from Voy Por Ustedes. On Boxing Day he lined up as the 8/13 favourite for the King George VI Chase at Kempton Park. He was positioned near the front by Ruby Walsh and took the lead with three fences to jump. After drawing clear, he hit the final fence but still won by 8 lengths from Exotic Dancer. Kauto Star then won the Aon Chase over L'Ami by a neck.

His final race of the season came in the 2007 Cheltenham Gold Cup at the Cheltenham Festival, where, ridden by Ruby Walsh, he started the 5/4 favourite. Kingscliff and Beef Or Salmon led in the early stages of the race, with Kauto Star held up near the rear. He made progress through the field and was near the leaders with four fences left to jump. Walsh then asked him for an effort and he quickened to take the lead two fences from the finish. He hit the final fence, but stayed on strongly to beat Exotic Dancer by 2 1/2 lengths, with outsider Turpin Green another 2 1/2 lengths back in third place. By winning the Betfair Chase, King George and Gold Cup, Kauto Star won the Stayers Chase Triple Crown £1 million bonus. He also won the National Hunt Order of Merit for the 2006/07 season and finished as the top-rated chaser.

=== 2007/08 season ===
Kauto Star had an additional challenge to face during the 2007/08 as another of Paul Nicholls' horses, Denman, had easily won the Royal & SunAlliance Chase, the top race for novice 3 mile chasers, at the previous season's Cheltenham Festival when also ridden by Ruby Walsh. Nicholls stated his intention to keep the pair apart for the majority of the season, with the two horses not scheduled to race against each other until the Cheltenham Gold Cup in March.

==== Early season ====
Kauto Star again began the season in the Old Roan Chase at Aintree, where he faced three rivals: Melling Chase winner Monet's Garden, Gold Cup runner up Exotic Dancer and Ashley Brook. Before the race, Paul Nicholls warned that Kauto Star, who started the 10/11 favourite, needed the run. During the closing stages of the race, he chased leader Monet's Garden but could not catch him. Monet's Garden won by 1 1/2 lengths from Kauto Star, who was giving him a stone in weight, with Exotic Dancer a further 20 lengths back in third. Kauto Star continued to follow the same path as last season and next started in the Betfair Chase, where he was ridden by Sam Thomas due to regular jockey Ruby Walsh being out injured with a dislocated shoulder. Despite his previous defeat, he again started as the odds-on favourite. During the race, he was pushed all the way to the finish by Exotic Dancer, but held on to win by 1/2 length. The two were well clear of the rest of the seven-runner field.

==== Mid-winter ====
Kauto Star then headed to Kempton Park, for the King George VI Chase. With Walsh back in the saddle, he won by 11 lengths from Ascot Chase winner Our Vic, with Exotic Dancer in third place. The horse's final preparation for the Cheltenham Gold Cup was in the Ascot Chase over 2 miles 5 furlongs. By this time, Walsh had announced his intention to ride Kauto Star in the Gold Cup, with Sam Thomas booked to ride Denman. Kauto eased to victory, winning by eight lengths from Monet's Garden. However, it was reported that Kauto Star was understood to be slightly lame after the race. Paul Nicholls revealed that his vet had examined Kauto Star that morning and that the horse appeared to have an infection in one of his hind feet.

==== Spring ====
Horse racing fans were awaiting the 2008 Cheltenham Gold Cup clash between Kauto Star and his stablemate Denman. During the season, Denman had not been defeated, winning the Hennessy Gold Cup, Lexus Chase and Aon Chase. Kauto Star was sent off 10/11 favourite to retain his crown with Denman starting at 9/4. Denman took up the race to lead with a circuit to go and won by 7 lengths with Kauto Star finishing second, just holding off stablemate Neptune Collonges. Kauto Star narrowly lost his last race of the season to Ryanair winner Our Vic in the Totesport Bowl at Aintree. However, this second-place finish ensured he won the 2008 Order of Merit title, becoming the first and only horse to win this two seasons in succession. Kauto Star's owner, Clive Smith, put the defeat down to the horse's busy season and also the short time since the Cheltenham Gold Cup. Nicholls said that the riding tactics contributed to the defeat.

=== 2008/09 season ===
==== Early season ====
Kauto Star started the 2008/09 season in the JNwine.com Champion Chase at Down Royal. Starting the 2/5 favourite, he took the lead with three fences to jump and won by 11 lengths from Light On The Broom without being extended. His next start came in the Betfair Chase and he was ridden by Sam Thomas, with Walsh being out injured with a ruptured spleen. Kauto Star started the 2/5 favourite and his main opposition in the betting again came from Exotic Dancer. At the final fence, he was moving up to leader Tamarinbleu when he stumbled on landing and unseated Thomas. Snoopy Loopy won the race by 1/2 length from Tamarinbleu.

==== King George VI Chase ====
Kauto Star returned to Kempton Park for the King George VI Chase. He started the race at 10/11 and the opposition included former Queen Mother Champion Chase winner Voy Por Ustedes, Ellier Developments Champion Novice Chase winner Air Force One, Imperial Commander, Our Vic, Snoopy Loopy and Royal & SunAlliance Chase winner Albertas Run. With Walsh back as jockey, Kauto Star took the lead with four left to jump and despite a mistake at the last, he went clear to win by 8 lengths from Albertas Run, with Voy Por Ustedes 1/2 length back in third and the three being well clear of the rest of the field. This was his third consecutive victory in the race. After Kauto Star's defeat following the short break between the races at Down Royal and Haydock, Nicholls stated he had come to the conclusion that the horse was best run fresh, so unlike previous seasons he would not run again before Cheltenham where he was once again being aimed at the Cheltenham Gold Cup, as was stable companion and current holder Denman.

==== Cheltenham Gold Cup ====
Kauto Star started the 2009 Cheltenham Gold Cup as the favourite and was attempting to become the first horse to ever regain the Gold Cup. The leaders in the betting were Kauto Star at 7/4, Denman at 7/1, Hennessy Gold Cup winner Neptune Collonges at 15/2 and Exotic Dancer at 8/1. Kauto Star tracked the leaders in the early stages and moved into the lead after jumping the third last fence. He then pulled clear before the last to win by 13 lengths from Denman. Exotic Dancer was third, 2 1/2 lengths behind Denman. Kauto Star ended the season as the top-rated steeplechase horse for the second time.

=== 2009/10 season ===
==== Betfair Chase ====
Kauto Star started the 2009/10 season in the Betfair Chase. He was held up near the rear of the field by Walsh and with two fences left to jump he took the lead. As they approached the last, Imperial Commander drew level with him. The two horses battled all the way to the finishing line, with Kauto Star winning by a nose. The pair were 24 lengths clear of third-placed Madison Du Berlais. This was Kauto Star's third Betfair Chase win in a row.

==== King George VI Chase ====
On Boxing Day 2009 at Kempton Park, Kauto Star attempted to win his fourth consecutive King George VI Chase. He jumped well throughout the race and went clear with three fences to jump, then easily drew clear to win by 36 lengths. The margin of victory set a new record in the race, breaking Arkle's 44-year-old record of 30 lengths, and directly leading to the rule change dispensing with the traditional winning distance of "a distance" which had previously been used for wins of more than 30 lengths. In winning the race, Kauto Star was awarded a Racing Post Rating of 192, the highest ever earned by a National Hunt horse. He was given a Timeform rating of 191, the highest given to a horse in almost 40 years and making him the joint-third highest-rated steeplechaser of all time, level with Mill House and behind only Arkle (212) and Flyingbolt (210). He was also officially rated 193, the highest ever awarded to a chaser.

==== Cheltenham Gold Cup ====
Once again sent off as short-priced favourite for the 2010 Cheltenham Gold Cup, Kauto Star was strongly fancied to win it for the third time. He spent the early part of the race travelling well and at the seventh fence went into second place. He looked to put in an equally big jump at the eighth fence before seeming to change his mind just after takeoff and crashed through the fence. This knocked him back to fifth place and despite getting back into contention, he never recovered the fluidity of earlier in the race. At the fourth-to-last fence, known as the downhill fence, and when in fifth place, Kauto Star fell awkwardly, landing on his neck. However, he got to his feet, apparently unscathed. The race was won by the Nigel Twiston-Davies-trained Imperial Commander, with Denman in second and Mon Mome in third place. Unusually for a non-finisher, Kauto Star was applauded by those in the grandstands as he returned to the unsaddling area.

=== 2010/2011 season ===
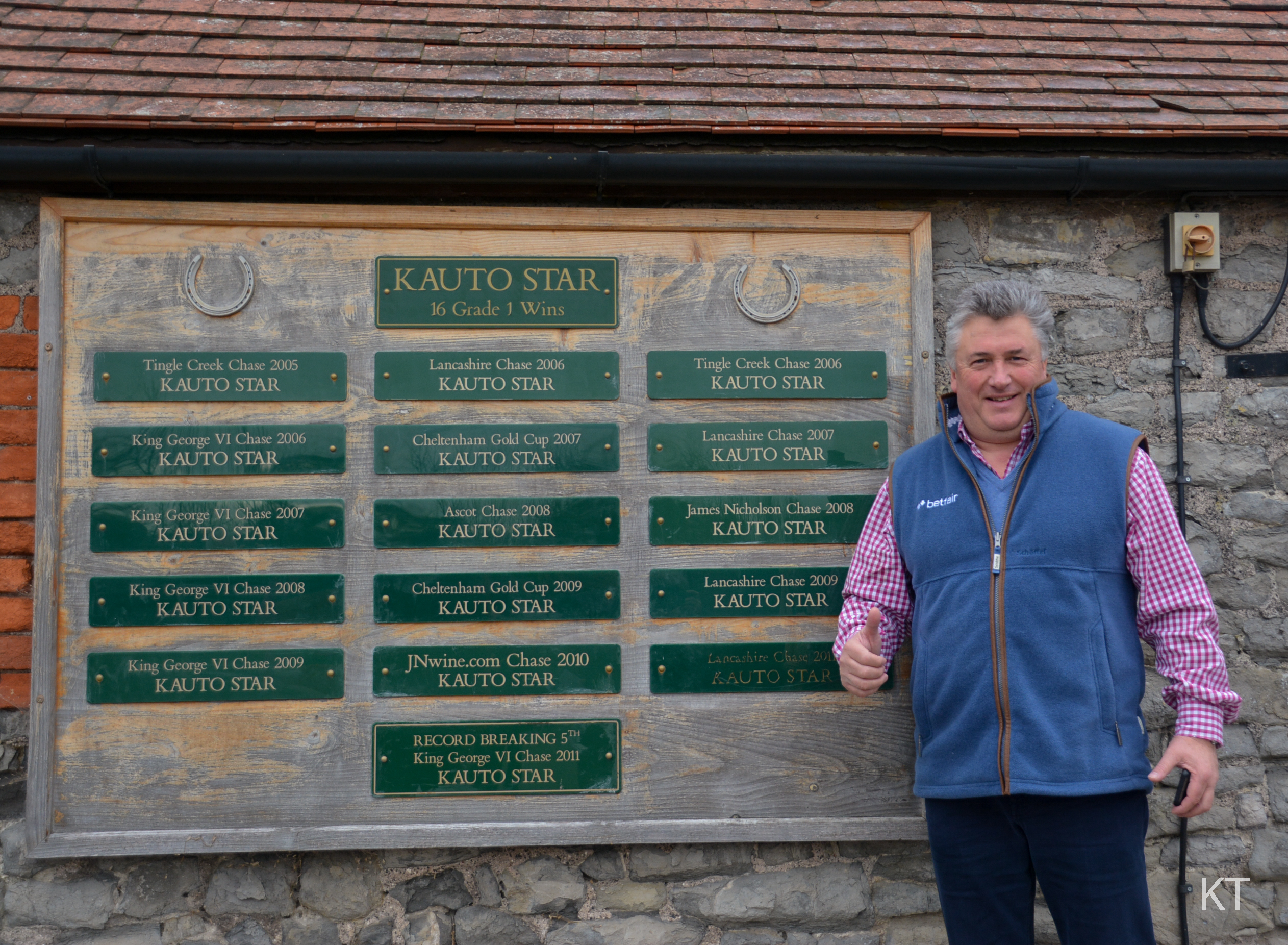
Trainer Paul Nicholls with plaques of Kauto Star's notable wins up to 2011

==== Winter ====
Kauto Star began his season in the JNwine.com Champion Chase at Down Royal. After tracking the leaders, he went on to win by four lengths from Arkle Challenge Trophy winner Sizing Europe. His next race was an attempt to win a record-breaking fifth consecutive King George VI Chase in a meeting which was rearranged to mid-January after the original Boxing Day fixture was postponed due to snow. He was once more sent off the odds-on favourite. Ruby Walsh was injured, and multiple champion jockey Tony McCoy came in for the ride for the first time. Kauto Star looked beaten when blundering at the second last. Long Run won the race by 12 lengths from Riverside Theatre, who was a further 7 lengths clear of Kauto Star. It was the first time since coming to the UK that Kauto Star finished outside the first two in a completed race. In the aftermath of the race, there were calls for Kauto Star to be retired as there was a school of thought that age had caught up with the horse. It was discovered he was suffering from a low-grade infection and had bled during the race for the first time. Paul Nicholls announced that Kauto Star would be trained for the Gold Cup as originally planned.

==== Spring ====
The Cheltenham Gold Cup marked the first time Kauto Star had not started favourite for a race since 2005. Long Run started as the 7/2 favourite, with Imperial Commander at 4/1, Kauto Star at 5/1 and Denman at 8/1. Kauto Star and Denman led with three fences left to jump, but Long Run stayed on to go past both of them, winning by 7 lengths from Denman. Kauto Star was a further 4 lengths back in third and only just held off totesport Bowl winner What A Friend. Kauto Star then ran in the Punchestown Gold Cup in May. He started as the 10/11 favourite, but was pulled up for the first time in his career by Ruby Walsh. Follow The Plan won the race. Walsh reported after the race that the horse was 'never travelling'. Again, Kauto Star was applauded as he returned to the racecourse stables.

Calls for Kauto Star's retirement grew more vociferous, although connections stated their intention to bring him back into training after the summer break and assess the horse's condition before aiming him for another race if they were satisfied with his physical and mental wellbeing.

=== 2011/12 season ===
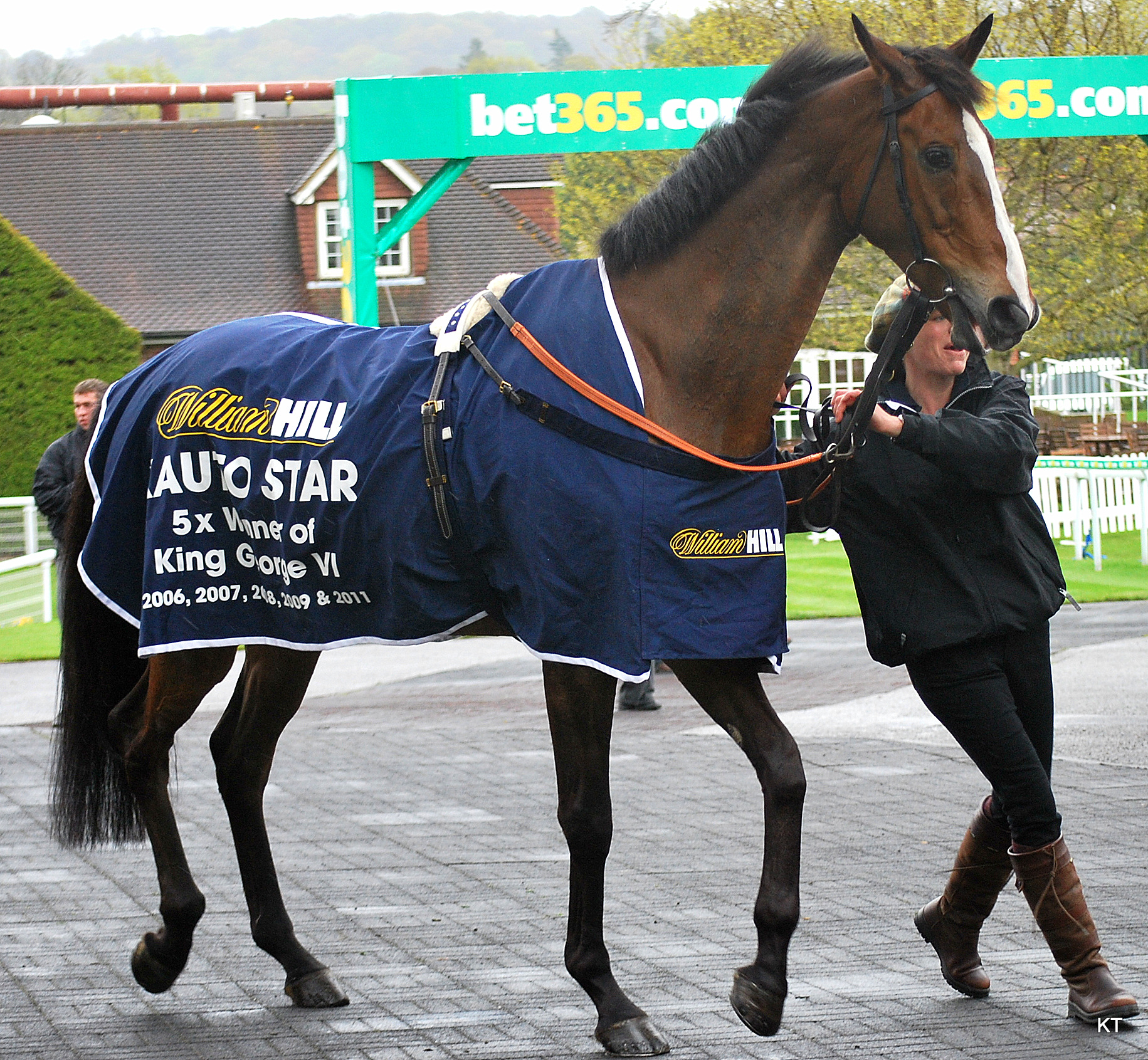
Kauto Star at Sandown on 28 April 2012.

==== The Betfair Chase ====
On Saturday 19 November 2011, Kauto Star lined up for the Betfair Chase at Haydock Park, having pleased his trainer and work rider with his enthusiasm on his return to training. He started at odds of 6/1, the longest starting price of his UK career. Ridden prominently by usual partner Ruby Walsh, Kauto Star made it four victories in the race, having previously won it in 2006, 2007 and 2009. He won by eight lengths from favourite Long Run, turning the tables on his Gold Cup and King George conqueror of the previous season. In doing so, he became the only horse to win two different Grade 1 jump races four times (the other being the King George VI Chase). He also became the only horse to win a Grade 1 race in seven consecutive seasons. After the race, Ruby Walsh said: "He's an amazing horse and a privilege to ride. I was hoping that there was one more big day in him."

==== King George VI Chase ====
On Boxing Day, Kauto Star lined up for the King George VI Chase for the sixth year in succession. Despite his victory over Long Run at Haydock, Long Run was sent off the even money favourite, with Kauto Star at 3/1. Also featuring prominently in the betting were dual Queen Mother Champion Chase winner Master Minded at 11/2 and Arkle Challenge Trophy winner Captain Chris at 8/1. Kauto Star jumped well and took the lead with four to jump. Long Run closed in the finishing straight, but could not catch him. At the finish, Kauto Star won by 1 1/4 lengths from Long Run. His victory prompted his normally undemonstrative jockey Ruby Walsh to hug his neck on pulling up. Kauto Star therefore made history by becoming the first horse to win the King George VI Chase five times. After the race, owner Clive Smith said, "He's amazing, I'll never have another like him. He was in top, top form and it was just a case if he had recovered from Haydock." Kauto Star was immediately promoted to second favourite in the ante-post betting for the Cheltenham Gold Cup in March 2012.

==== Cheltenham Gold Cup ====
At the end of February 2012, Paul Nicholls announced that Kauto Star had suffered an "awful fall" during a routine schooling session at his training yard, putting his participation in the Gold Cup in doubt. Intensive physiotherapy and walking exercise brought about a rapid improvement and a week before the Gold Cup, Kauto Star took part in a racecourse gallop at Wincanton Racecourse which pleased connections and put him back on track for the Cheltenham showpiece event. However, in the race he was pulled up with more than a lap remaining. The race was won by Synchronised. While Kauto Star suffered no major injuries, owner Clive Smith stated that he would most likely be retired. At the end of the season, he was the highest rated steeplechaser for a fourth time.

== Retirement ==
His expected retirement was confirmed at the end of October 2012.

His trainer, Paul Nicholls, and his owner, Clive Smith, subsequently disagreed over how he should spend his post-racing career. As a result, the horse left Nicholls' yard at Ditcheat on 11 December 2012 and was sent to Laura Collett who, together with Yogi Breisner, the coach of the Great Britain dressage team, assessed the horse to determine if he was suitable for the sport. Clive Smith said of Nicholls: "He is trying emotional blackmail, saying that Kauto Star would be better off staying at Ditcheat to be Clifford Baker's hack. I always want to do the best for Kauto Star. We are going to try it, what is wrong with that?"

=== Death ===
On 24 June 2015, Kauto Star was seriously injured when falling in his paddock. After receiving intensive medical treatment over the weekend at the Valley Equine Hospital, the multiple injuries proved too severe and on Monday 29 June, 3 pm BST the horse was humanely euthanized, veterinary assistant Hattie Lawrence reporting "Three bones appear to have been fractured... There also appears to have been a fracture to the spine at the base of the neck... This ultimately was the most significant injury as it produced the paralysis that made it impossible for him to stand". The news of his death only broke a day later and tributes were sent from racing bodies like The Jockey Club, "Deeply saddened to hear the news about Kauto Star, so many amazing memories of a true champion and incredible athlete", and personalities like AP McCoy, "Sad news about KAUTO STAR the most complete chaser of the modern-era RIP".

== Full Race Record ==
Date	Racecourse	Distance	Race	Jockey	Weight	Going	Odds	Field	Result	Margin	Rating
01 Mar 03	Bordeaux	1m 6 1/2f	Prix Bournosienne (Hurdle)	F Barrao	10-3	Good	N/A	5	2nd	Short Head	
14 Apr 03	Enghien	1m 7f	Prix Du Brevent (Hurdle)	F Barrao	10-1	V Soft	N/A	11	1st	5 lengths	
4 May 03	Auteuil	1m 7f	Prix Go Ahead (Hurdle)	F Barrao	10-4	V Soft	N/A	9	1st	Head	
27 Sep 03	Auteuil	2 1/4 miles	Prix Robert Lejeune (H) Listed	J Guiheneuf	10-4	V Soft	N/A	6	1st	3/4 length	71 kg
11 Oct 03	Auteuil	2 1/4 miles	Prix Georges De Roy (H) G2	J Guiheneuf	10-6	V Soft	N/A	8	Fell		71 kg
02 Nov 03	Auteuil	2 1/4 miles	Prix Cambaceres (H) G2	J Guiheneuf	10-4	V Soft	N/A	11	2nd	10 lengths	74 kg
07 Mar 04	Auteuil	2 1/4 miles	Prix Jacques d'Indy (H) G3	J Guiheneuf	10-10	Soft	N/A	12	3rd	10 lengths	74 kg
27 Mar 04	Auteuil	2 1/4 miles	Prix De Pepinvast (H) G3	J Guiheneuf	10-8	V Soft	11/2	10	5th	19 lengths	74 kg
24 Apr 04	Auteuil	2m 3 1/2f	Prix Amadou (Hurdle) G2	J Guiheneuf	10-6	V Soft	11/1	8	3rd	19 lengths	73 kg
30 May 04	Auteuil	2m 3 1/2f	Prix De Longchamp (H) G3	J Guiheneuf	10-4	V Soft	36/1	9	1st	8 lengths	78 kg
29 Dec 04	Newbury	2m 2 1/2f	Novice Chase	R Walsh	10-7	Gd-Sft	2/1jf	8	1st	9 lengths	
31 Jan 05	Exeter	2m 1 1/2f	Novice Chase	R Walsh	11-4	Soft	2/11f	3	2nd	Short Head	
01 Nov 05	Exeter	2m 1 1/2f	Haldon Gold Cup Chase G2	R Walsh	10-9	Gd-Sft	3/1	11	2nd	4 lengths	149
03 Dec 05	Sandown	1m 7 1/2f	Tingle Creek Chase G1	M Fitzgerald	11-7	Soft	5/2jf	7	1st	1 1/2 lengths	150
15 Mar 06	Cheltenham	2 miles	Champion Chase G1	R Walsh	11-10	Good	2/1f	12	Fell		167
22 Oct 06	Aintree	2 1/2 miles	Old Roan H'cap Chase G2	R Walsh	11-10	Good	1/1f	5	1st	21 lengths	167
18 Nov 06	Haydock	3 miles	Betfair Chase G1	R Walsh	11-7	Gd-Sft	11/10f	6	1st	17 lengths	173
02 Dec 06	Sandown	2 miles	Tingle Creek Chase G1	R Walsh	11-7	Soft	4/9f	7	1st	7 lengths	176
26 Dec 06	Kempton	3 miles	King George VI Chase G1	R Walsh	11-10	Gd-Sft	8/13f	9	1st	8 lengths	173
10 Feb 07	Newbury	3 miles	Aon Chase G2	R Walsh	11-10	Soft	2/9f	6	1st	Neck	177
16 Mar 07	Cheltenham	3m 2 1/2f	Cheltenham Gold Cup G1	R Walsh	11-10	Gd-Sft	5/4f	18	1st	2 1/2 lengths	176
28 Oct 07	Aintree	2 1/2 miles	Old Roan H'cap Chase G2	R Walsh	11-10	Good	11/10f	4	2nd	1 1/2 lengths	179
24 Nov 07	Haydock	3 miles	Betfair Chase G1	S Thomas	11-7	Soft	4/5f	7	1st	1/2 length	179
26 Dec 07	Kempton	3 miles	King George VI Chase G1	R Walsh	11-10	Gd-Sft	4/6f	7	1st	11 lengths	179
16 Feb 08	Ascot	2m 5 1/2f	Ascot Chase G1	R Walsh	11-7	Good	4/11f	9	1st	8 lengths	180
14 Mar 08	Cheltenham	3m 2 1/2f	Cheltenham Gold Cup G1	R Walsh	11-10	Gd-Sft	10/11f	12	2nd	7 lengths	180
03 Apr 08	Aintree	3m 1f	Totesport Bowl Chase G2	R Walsh	11-10	Good	4/7f	5	2nd	Nose	180
01 Nov 08	Down Royal	3 miles	JNWine Champion Chase G1	R Walsh	11-10	Soft	2/5f	5	1st	11 lengths	179
22 Nov 08	Haydock	3 miles	Betfair Chase G1	S Thomas	11-7	Gd-Sft	2/5f	6	UR		179
26 Dec 08	Kempton	3 miles	King George VI Chase G1	R Walsh	11-10	Good	10/11f	10	1st	8 lengths	175
13 Mar 09	Cheltenham	3m 2 1/2f	Cheltenham Gold Cup G1	R Walsh	11-10	Gd-Soft	7/4f	16	1st	13 lengths	177
21 Nov 09	Haydock	3 miles	Betfair Chase G1	R Walsh	11-7	Soft	4/6f	7	1st	Nose	186
26 Dec 09	Kempton	3 miles	King George VI Chase G1	R Walsh	11-10	Gd-Sft	8/13f	13	1st	36 lengths	186
19 Mar 10	Cheltenham	3m 2 1/2f	Cheltenham Gold Cup G1	R Walsh	11-10	Good	8/11f	11	Fell		193
06 Nov 10	Down Royal	3 miles	JNWine Champion Chase G1	R Walsh	11-10	Soft	4/7f	7	1st	4 lengths	190
15 Jan 11	Kempton	3 miles	King George VI Chase G1	A P McCoy	11-10	Gd-Sft	4/7f	9	3rd	19 lengths	190
18 Mar 11	Cheltenham	3m 2 1/2f	Cheltenham Gold Cup G1	R Walsh	11-10	Good	5/1	13	3rd	11 lengths	174
4 May 11	Punchestown	3m 1f	Punchestown Gold Cup G1	R Walsh	11-10	Good	10/11f	8	PU		173
19 Nov 11	Haydock	3 miles	Betfair Chase G1	R Walsh	11-7	Gd-Sft	6/1	6	1st	8 lengths	170
26 Dec 11	Kempton	3 miles	King George VI Chase G1	R Walsh	11-10	Gd-Sft	3/1	7	1st	1 1/4 lengths	174
16 Mar 12	Cheltenham	3m 2 1/2f	Cheltenham Gold Cup G1	R Walsh	11-10	Good	3/1	14	PU		183

== Assessment ==
Timeform rate Kauto Star as the joint-fourth best steeplechase horse in their history. His rating of 191 is equal to Mill House and surpassed only by Arkle on 212, Flyingbolt on 210 and Sprinter Sacre on 192. He was officially rated the best steeplechase horse of the 2006/07, 2007/08, 2009/10 and 2011/12 seasons. He also achieved the highest Racing Post rating ever awarded (192).

== Popular culture ==
Author Jilly Cooper met Kauto Star as part of research for her 2010 novel Jump!

== Pedigree ==
Pedigree of Kauto Star, bay gelding, 2000
Sire Village Star ch. 1983	Moulin ch. 1976	Mill Reef b.1968	Never Bend
Sire Village Star ch. 1983	Moulin ch. 1976	Mill Reef b.1968	Milan Mill
Sire Village Star ch. 1983	Moulin ch. 1976	High Fidelyty b. 1968	Hautain
Sire Village Star ch. 1983	Moulin ch. 1976	High Fidelyty b. 1968	Paladrina
Sire Village Star ch. 1983	Glitter b. 1976	Reliance b. 1962	Tantieme
Sire Village Star ch. 1983	Glitter b. 1976	Reliance b. 1962	Relance
Sire Village Star ch. 1983	Glitter b. 1976	Glistening b. 1968	Aureole
Sire Village Star ch. 1983	Glitter b. 1976	Glistening b. 1968	Causerie
Dam Kauto Relka b. 1993	Port Etienne b.1983	Mill Reef b.1968	Never Bend
Dam Kauto Relka b. 1993	Port Etienne b.1983	Mill Reef b.1968	Milan Mill
Dam Kauto Relka b. 1993	Port Etienne b.1983	Sierra Morena ch. 1973	Canisbay
Dam Kauto Relka b. 1993	Port Etienne b.1983	Sierra Morena ch. 1973	Saigon
Dam Kauto Relka b. 1993	Kautoretta b.1981	Kautokeino b. 1967	Relko
Dam Kauto Relka b. 1993	Kautoretta b.1981	Kautokeino b. 1967	Cranberry
Dam Kauto Relka b. 1993	Kautoretta b.1981	Verdurette ch. 1971	Lionel
Dam Kauto Relka b. 1993	Kautoretta b.1981	Verdurette ch. 1971	Tyrolina

Note: b. = Bay, ch. = Chestnut

== See also ==
- List of leading Thoroughbred racehorses
- Repeat winners of horse races
