= Paul Barber (farmer) =

English farmer (1942 – 2023)

Paul Kelson Barber (31 December 1942 – 18 June 2023) was an English farmer and cheese manufacturer. He was also successful as a racehorse owner, twice winning the Cheltenham Gold Cup as part-owner of horses See More Business in 1999 and Denman in 2008. He owned Manor Farm Stables at Ditcheat, the base of racehorse trainer Paul Nicholls.
