= Lancashire Chase =

Steeplechase horse race in Britain

- Class: Grade 1
- Location: Haydock Park; Haydock, England
- Inaugurated: 2005
- Race type: Steeplechase
- Sponsor: Betfair
- Website: Haydock Park

Race information
- Distance: 3m 1f 125y (5,143 metres)
- Surface: Turf
- Track: Left-handed
- Qualification: Five-years-old and up
- Weight: 11 st 10 lb Allowances; 7 lb for mares
- Purse: £200,000 (2025); 1st: £112,540

Lancashire Chase
2025
Grey Dawning	Royale Pagaille	Stellar Story

Previous years
2024
Royale Pagaille	Grey Dawning	Bravemansgame
2023
Royale Pagaille	Bravemansgame	Corach Rambler
2022
Protektorat	Eldorado Allen	Frodon
2021
A Plus Tard	Royale Pagaille	Chatham Street Lad

2020-2011
2020
Bristol De Mai	Clan Des Obeaux	Lostintranslation
2019
Lostintranslation	Bristol De Mai	Frodon
2018
Bristol De Mai	Native River	Thistlecrack
2017
Bristol De Mai	Cue Card	Outlander
2016
Cue Card	Coneygree	Vezelay
2015
Cue Card	Silviniaco Conti	Dynaste
2014
Silviniaco Conti	Menorah	Dynaste
2013
Cue Card	Dynaste	Silviniaco Conti
2012
Silviniaco Conti	Long Run	The Giant Bolster
2011
Kauto Star	Long Run	Weird Al

2010-2005
2010
Imperial Commander	Tidal Bay	Planet of Sound
2009
Kauto Star	Imperial Commander	Madison Du Berlais
2008
Snoopy Loopy	Tamarinbleu	Exotic Dancer
2007
Kauto Star	Exotic Dancer	Beef Or Salmon
2006
Kauto Star	Beef Or Salmon	L'ami
2005
Kingscliff	Beef Or Salmon	Kicking King

The Lancashire Chase (usually referred to using its sponsored title, the Betfair Chase) is a Grade 1 National Hunt steeplechase in Great Britain which is open to horses aged five years or older. It is run at Haydock Park over a distance of about 3 miles and 1½ furlongs (3 miles 1 furlong and 125 yards, or 5,143 metres), and during its running there are nineteen fences to be jumped. The race is scheduled to take place in November each year.

== History ==
The event was established in 2005, and it originally served as the first part of a bonus scheme called the Betfair Million. Its sponsor, Betfair, offered a sum of £1,000,000 to leading contenders for successful performances in two subsequent races.

The initial version of the Betfair Million was awarded if the winner of the Betfair Chase went on to win both the King George VI Chase and the Cheltenham Gold Cup. The Lexus Chase was included as an alternative second leg for the next two years, and Kauto Star won the prize by taking the original route in 2006–07. The format was changed in 2008–09, when the bonus became available to any first-three finisher achieving first or second at the Cheltenham Festival and then winning the Grand National. The Betfair Million was dropped the following year. The £1,000,000 bonus returned as the "Chase Triple Crown" in 2015 when Jockey Club Racecourses offered it to any horse winning the race, the King George VI Chase and Cheltenham Gold Cup. Cue Card won the first two legs of the 2015–16 bonus but fell when in contention at Cheltenham. Since 2016 the Kauto Star Trophy has been awarded to the owner of a horse completing the Chase Triple Crown.

The race is familiarly known by its sponsored name of the Betfair Chase, but its registered title is the Lancashire Chase. It is now the first Grade 1 event of the British National Hunt season. Prior to 2017 it was run over a distance of about 3 miles. The distance was increased to allow a longer run from the start to the first bend.

The original Lancashire Chase was first run at Manchester Racecourse in 1884.

== Records ==
Most successful horse (4 wins):

- Kauto Star – 2006, 2007, 2009, 2011

Leading jockey (4 wins):

- Ruby Walsh – Kauto Star (2006, 2009, 2011), Silvianaco Conti (2012)

Leading trainer (6 wins):

- Paul Nicholls – Kauto Star (2006, 2007, 2009, 2011), Silvianaco Conti (2012, 2014)

== Winners ==
Year	Winner	Age	Jockey	Trainer
2005	Kingscliff	8	Robert Walford	Robert Alner
2006	Kauto Star	6	Ruby Walsh	Paul Nicholls
2007	Kauto Star	7	Sam Thomas	Paul Nicholls
2008	Snoopy Loopy	10	Seamus Durack	Peter Bowen
2009	Kauto Star	9	Ruby Walsh	Paul Nicholls
2010	Imperial Commander	9	Paddy Brennan	Nigel Twiston-Davies
2011	Kauto Star	11	Ruby Walsh	Paul Nicholls
2012	Silviniaco Conti	6	Ruby Walsh	Paul Nicholls
2013	Cue Card	7	Joe Tizzard	Colin Tizzard
2014	Silviniaco Conti	8	Noel Fehily	Paul Nicholls
2015	Cue Card	9	Paddy Brennan	Colin Tizzard
2016	Cue Card	10	Paddy Brennan	Colin Tizzard
2017	Bristol De Mai	6	Daryl Jacob	Nigel Twiston-Davies
2018	Bristol De Mai	7	Daryl Jacob	Nigel Twiston-Davies
2019	Lostintranslation	7	Robbie Power	Colin Tizzard
2020	Bristol De Mai	9	Daryl Jacob	Nigel Twiston-Davies
2021	A Plus Tard	7	Rachael Blackmore	Henry de Bromhead
2022	Protektorat	7	Harry Skelton	Dan Skelton
2023	Royale Pagaille	9	Charlie Deutsch	Venetia Williams
2024	Royale Pagaille	10	Charlie Deutsch	Venetia Williams
2025	Grey Dawning	8	Harry Skelton	Dan Skelton
2026	Grey Dawning	9	Harry Skelton	Dan Skelton

== See also ==
- Horse racing in Great Britain
- List of British National Hunt races
