= Cane Brake =

Plantation home in South Carolina, US

Coordinates: 34°00′43″N 81°45′09″W

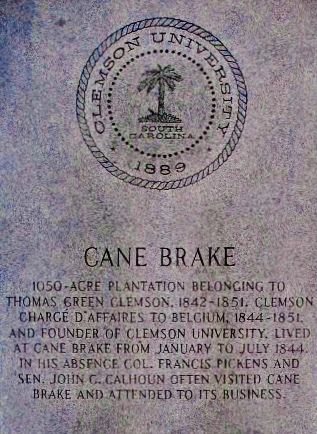
Stone historical marker placed by Clemson University at Cane Brake Plantation in Edgefield, South Carolina

Cane Brake was a plantation home in Saluda, South Carolina, an historic property of Thomas Green Clemson of Philadelphia, Pennsylvania, after whom Clemson University is named.

In 1843, while applying his scientific training to assist his father-in-law, U.S. Vice President John C. Calhoun in a mining venture, as well as in agricultural production at Fort Hill, Clemson bought his own plantation, Cane Brake, in Edgefield, South Carolina. The plantation and the big house had been owned by Arthur Simkins, who died in 1826. Clemson staffed Cane Brake with slaves he acquired from his wife's cousin, Sen. John Ewing Colhoun Jr., who was deep in debt. At the time, Thomas Clemson wrote that he rejected slavery. “My experience tells me that the Institution of slavery is at all times good for the Negro (no laborers in the world are so well off.) At times good for the master, but very bad for the state”.

He soon moved abroad, accepting an appointment from President John Tyler as chargé d'affaires and highest-ranking American ambassador to Belgium. However, Clemson was soon dismissed by Secretary of State Daniel Webster, a political foe.

In 1853, after Clemson came home to the United States, he sold Cane Brake to Alfred Dearing, who died in 1856.
