= Sam Thomas (jockey) =

Welsh jockey (born 1984)

Personal information
- Born: 22 June 1984 (age 42) Abergavenny, Wales
- Occupation: Jockey

Horse racing career
- Sport: Horse racing
- Career wins: 509

Major racing wins
- Cheltenham Gold Cup, Betfair Chase, Tingle Creek Chase, Savills Chase

Significant horses
- Denman, Kauto Star, Twist Magic

Sam Thomas (born 22 June 1984) is a retired Welsh National Hunt jockey who is now a horse trainer. He is best known for winning the 2008 Cheltenham Gold Cup with Denman.

Across his career as a jockey, Thomas won 509 races and earned £5.59 million prize money in Great Britain and a further €255,815 in the Republic of Ireland.

== Personal life ==
Thomas was born in Abergavenny, Wales. He rode in point to points before graduating to race riding.

== Racing career ==
Thomas began his racing career with David Evans in Wales. He primarily looked after the horses and took them to races. Thomas had his first runner at Exeter Racecourse, If And But on 20 December 2001. His first winner was Indian Summer at Ludlow Racecourse on 2 April 2003.

Thomas joined Venetia Williams yard and by 20 he had ridden out his claim, and saw success with Limerick Boy winning the 2004 Lanzarote Hurdle at Kempton Park and a Summer Cup at Uttoxeter Racecourse with Kock De La Vesvre.

Thomas would later join Paul Nicholls as second jockey to Ruby Walsh. Big race victories followed, including his first Group 1 winner in the Betfair Chase with Kauto Star and later the 2007 Tingle Creek Chase with Twist Magic.

The biggest race win of his career came in 2008, taking victory in the Cheltenham Gold Cup with Denman beating stablemate Kauto Star.

Following his Gold Cup victory, Thomas had mixed form in 2008 which led to doubts in the media over his future with his current employers. Continuing to ride Nicholls' top runners, he fell at the last fence in the Betfair Chase on Kauto Star, and again in the Hennessy Gold Cup at Newbury Racecourse on Big Buck's. Both races he was leading at the time.

Thomas would continue riding until 2015 when he retired. In 2017 he returned to the saddle for a charity race in aid of Bob Champion at Chepstow Racecourse, winning on Maoi Chinn Tire.

== Major wins ==
(United Kingdom) Great Britain

- Betfair Chase - Kauto Star (2007)
- Henry VIII Novices' Chase - Marodima (2007)
- Tingle Creek Chase - Twist Magic (2007)
- Scilly Isles Novices' Chase - Silverburn (2008)
- Cheltenham Gold Cup - Denman (2008)

Republic of Ireland

- John Durkan Memorial Punchestown Chase - Noland (2008)
- Savills Chase - What A Friend (2009)

== Cheltenham Festival winners (1) ==
- Cheltenham Gold Cup - Denman (2008)

== Training career ==
Following retirement, Thomas secured his trainers licence. He currently operates from Lisvane in Wales, a 35 box yard owned by businessman Dai Walters who previously owned Ffos Las Racecourse.

One of his most notable winners since starting training is Iwilldoit who won the 2021 Welsh Grand National at Chepstow Racecourse.
