= Punchestown Gold Cup =

Steeplechase horse race in Ireland

- Class: Grade 1
- Location: Punchestown; County Kildare, Ireland
- Race type: Steeplechase
- Sponsor: Coral
- Website: Punchestown

Race information
- Distance: 3m 120y (4,938 metres)
- Surface: Turf
- Track: Right-handed
- Qualification: Five-years-old and up
- Weight: 11 st 7 lb (5yo); 11 st 12 lb (6yo+); Allowances; 7 lb for mares
- Purse: €250,000 (2021); 1st: €147,500

Punchestown Gold Cup
2026
Gaelic Warrior	Fact To File	Grangeclare West

Previous years
2025
Galopin Des Champs	Spillane's Tower	Monty's Star
2024
Fastorslow	Galopin Des Champs	Hewick
2023
Fastorslow	Galopin Des Champs	Bravemansgame
2022
Allaho	Clan Des Obeaux	Al Boum Photo
2021
Clan Des Obeaux	Al Boum Photo	Fakir D'Oudairies

2020-2011
2019
Kemboy	Al Boum Photo	The Storyteller
2018
Bellshill	Djakadam	Road To Respect
2017
Sizing John	Djakadam	Coneygree
2016
Carlingford Lough	Djakadam	Don Poli
2015
Don Cossack	Djakadam	Road To Riches
2014
Boston Bob	First Lieutenant	Long Run
2013
Sir Des Champs	Long Run	First Lieutenant
2012
China Rock	Follow The Plan	Quel Esprit
2011
Follow The Plan	Vic Venturi	Rare Bob

2010-2003
2010
Planet Of Sound	War Of Attrition	Cooldine
2009
Notre Pere	Schindlers Hunt	Scotsirish
2008
Neptune Collonges	Snowy Morning	Mossbank
2007
Neptune Collonges	Kingscliff	In Compliance
2006
War Of Attrition	Beef Or Salmon	Hi Cloy
2005
Kicking King	Rule Supreme	Pizarro
2004
Beef Or Salmon	Harbour Pilot	First Gold
2003
First Gold	Rince Ri	Native Upmanship

The Punchestown Gold Cup is a Grade 1 National Hunt steeplechase in Ireland which is open to horses aged five years or older. It is run at Punchestown over a distance of about 3 miles and ½ furlong (3 miles and 120 yards, or 4,938 metres), and during its running there are seventeen fences to be jumped. The race is scheduled to take place each year during the Punchestown Festival in late April or early May.

The present version of the race was introduced in 1999, when it replaced a previous version for novice chasers only. It was formerly sponsored by Heineken, and it used to be known as the Heineken Gold Cup. It was backed by Diageo between 2005 and 2011, and from 2011 to 2014 sponsored by Tote Ireland. From 2014 to 2016 the race was sponsored by Bibby Financial Services and since 2017 Ladbrokes Coral has been the sponsor.

The Punchestown Gold Cup usually features horses which ran previously in the Cheltenham Gold Cup. The last to win both races in the same year was Gaelic Warrior in 2026.

== Records ==
Most successful horse (2 wins):

- Neptune Collonges – 2007, 2008
- Fastorslow – 2023, 2024

Leading jockey since 1999 (6 wins):

- Ruby Walsh – Imperial Call (1999), Commanche Court (2000), Neptune Collonges (2007, 2008), Boston Bob (2014), Kemboy (2019)

Leading trainer since 1999 (8 wins):

- Willie Mullins – Florida Pearl (2002), Sir Des Champs (2013), Boston Bob (2014), Bellshill (2018), Kemboy (2019), Allaho (2022), Galopin Des Champs (2025), Gaelic Warrior (2026)

== Winners since 1999 ==
Year	Winner	Age	Jockey	Trainer
1999	Imperial Call	10	Ruby Walsh	Raymond Hurley
2000	Commanche Court	7	Ruby Walsh	Ted Walsh
2001	Moscow Express (Note: The 2001 running took place at Fairyhouse)	9	Barry Geraghty	Frances Crowley
2002	Florida Pearl	10	Barry Geraghty	Willie Mullins
2003	First Gold	10	Thierry Doumen	François Doumen
2004	Beef Or Salmon	8	Timmy Murphy	Michael Hourigan
2005	Kicking King	7	Barry Geraghty	Tom Taaffe
2006	War Of Attrition	7	Conor O'Dwyer	Mouse Morris
2007	Neptune Collonges	6	Ruby Walsh	Paul Nicholls
2008	Neptune Collonges	7	Ruby Walsh	Paul Nicholls
2009	Notre Pere	8	Andrew Lynch	Jim Dreaper
2010	Planet of Sound	8	Richard Johnson	Philip Hobbs
2011	Follow the Plan	8	Tom Doyle	Oliver McKiernan
2012	China Rock	9	Barry Geraghty	Mouse Morris
2013	Sir Des Champs	7	Davy Russell	Willie Mullins
2014	Boston Bob	9	Ruby Walsh	Willie Mullins
2015	Don Cossack	8	Paul Carberry	Gordon Elliott
2016	Carlingford Lough	10	Barry Geraghty	John Kiely
2017	Sizing John	7	Robbie Power	Jessica Harrington
2018	Bellshill	8	David Mullins	Willie Mullins
2019	Kemboy	7	Ruby Walsh	Willie Mullins
	no race 2020 (Note: The 2020 running was cancelled because of the COVID-19 pandemic in the Republic of Ireland)
2021	Clan des Obeaux	9	Sam Twiston-Davies	Paul Nicholls
2022	Allaho	8	Paul Townend	Willie Mullins
2023	Fastorslow	7	JJ Slevin	Martin Brassil
2024	Fastorslow	8	JJ Slevin	Martin Brassil
2025	Galopin Des Champs	9	Paul Townend	Willie Mullins
2026	Gaelic Warrior	8	Paul Townend	Willie Mullins

== Earlier winners ==
- 1960 – Oberstown
- 1961 – Jungle Cry
- 1962 – Coniston
- 1963 – Arkle
- 1964 – Fort Leney
- 1965 – Clusium
- 1966 – Crown Prince
- 1967 – White Abbess
- 1968 – Herring Gull
- 1969 – Kings Sprite
- 1970 – Glencaraig Lady
- 1971 – Dim Wit
- 1972 – Ebony Lad
- 1973 – Tartan Ace
- 1974 – Lough Inagh
- 1975 – Fort Fox
- 1976 – No Hill
- 1977 – Artistic Prince
- 1978 – Jack of Trumps
- 1979 – Jack's the Buoy
- 1980 – Pillar Brae
- 1981 – Owens Image
- 1982 – Single-U-Jay
- 1983 – Whistling Senator
- 1984 – By the Way
- 1985 – Cerimau
- 1986 – Over the Last
- 1987 – Darkorjon
- 1988 – Vulgan's Pass
- 1989 – Carvill's Hill
- 1990 – Mixed Blends
- 1991 – Local Whisper
- 1992 – Second Schedual
- 1993 – Fissure Seal
- 1994 – Merry Gale
- 1995 – Butches Boy
- 1996 – Billygoat Gruff
- 1997 – Noyan
- 1998 – Mahler

== See also ==
- Horse racing in Ireland
- List of Irish National Hunt races
