= Neptune Collonges =

French racehorse

- After winning the 2006 WBX.com Rehearsal Chase on Fighting Fifth Hurdle Day
- Sire: Dom Alco
- Grandsire: Dom Pasquini
- Dam: Castille Collonges
- Damsire: El Badr
- Sex: Gelding
- Foaled: April 25, 2001
- Country: France
- Colour: Grey
- Breeder: Gaec Delorme Freres
- Owner: John Hales
- Trainer: Paul Nicholls
- Record: 36:16-4-3
- Earnings: £1,313,675

Major wins
- Prix Fleuret (2005); Winter Novices' Hurdle (2005); River Don Novices' Hurdle (2006); Prestige Novices' Hurdle (2006); Punchestown Gold Cup (2007, 2008); Hennessy Gold Cup (2009); Cotswold Chase (2011); Grand National (2012)

Neptune Collonges (foaled on 25 April 2001) is a retired AQPS racehorse who competed in National Hunt racing. His most noted success came when winning the Grand National on 14 April 2012.

== Background ==
Neptune Collonges was bred in France as an AQPS (a Selle Français warmblood with predominantly Thoroughbred parents). He was sired by Dom Alco out of the mare Castille Collonges. Owned by toy-maker John Hales, he was trained by Paul Nicholls at his Ditcheat yard, where he was known as Nipper and looked after by groom Clare Smith. He was ridden in eleven of his thirty-six starts by Ruby Walsh.

== Racing career ==
Neptune Collonges started racing as a three-year-old in France in December 2004, winning the Prix Raymond de Bouglon. Having been bought by Nicholls for Hales, he first raced in England in November 2005, easily winning a novice hurdle at Cheltenham. His first win in a graded race came in December 2005 when Barry Geraghty rode him to victory in the Grade 2 Winter Novices' Hurdle at Sandown Park. His first win in a Grade 1 race came in March 2007 when, ridden by Walsh, he won the Punchestown Gold Cup in Ireland, holding off Kingscliff by 3½ lengths. He successfully defended his title in the race the following year, defeating Snowy Morning by seven lengths. In December 2008, he was leading in the field in the Grade 1 Lexus Chase at Leopardstown in December 2008 when he fell at the second-last. Six weeks later he secured his third Grade 1 victory when he won Hennessy Gold Cup at Leopardstown, providing Walsh with his first win in the race.

Neptune Collanges ran four times without success in the Cheltenham Gold Cup at the Cheltenham Festival. In 2007 he came eighth behind stablemate Kauto Star; in 2008 he came third behind stablemate Denman; in 2009 he came fourth behind Kauto Star; in 2011 he was eighth behind Long Run. After the 2009 race, he was found to have injured a tendon and did not race at all during the following season.

At the time of his injury, Neptune Collonges had amassed 14 wins from 26 starts, with two second and three third places, while accumulating £685,279 in earnings. He returned to racing in November 2010 and in January 2011 won the Argento Chase at the Cheltenham Festival trials.

=== 2012 Grand National ===
Ridden by Daryl Jacob and starting at 33/1, Neptune Collonges won the 2012 Grand National on 14 April 2012, beating Sunnyhillboy by a nose in the closest-ever finish to the race. He was the first grey to win the National since Nicolaus Silver in 1961, and only the third grey to win the race (in addition to Nicolaus Silver, The Lamb won the race in 1868 and 1871). It was his only start in the race. His trainer said: "He's probably the best horse we've run in the race. He's got great form, he's been placed in Gold Cups, he stays, he's genuine and Daryl gave him a fantastic ride when you analyse where he went. It's absolutely brilliant." After the race, his owner said he would be retired immediately: "He'll never race again, that's it."

== Retirement ==
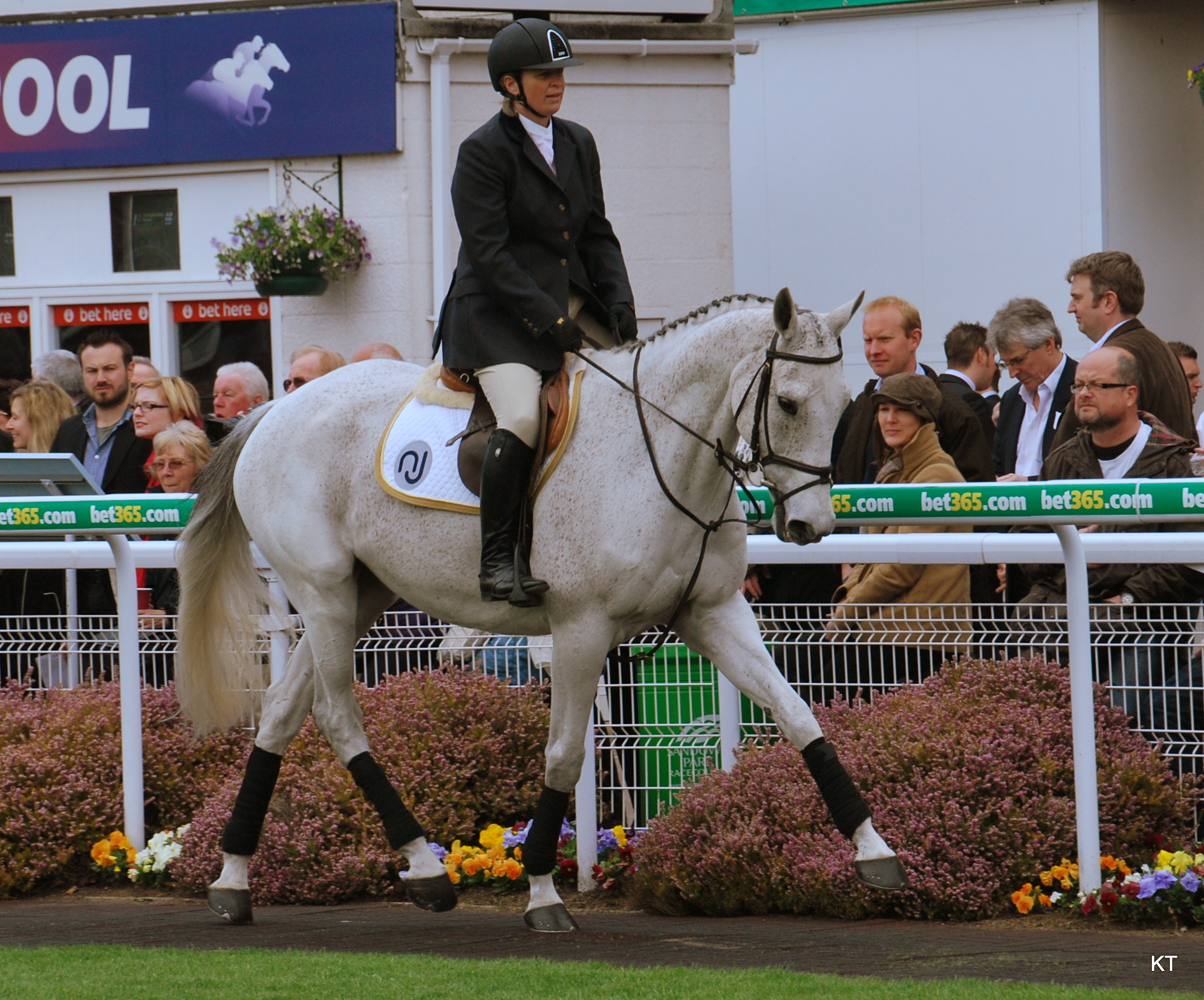
At a dressage event in 2013

After his retirement from racing in April 2012, Neptune Collonges moved to his owner's stables near Shifnal in Shropshire. He was retrained for dressage and competed for John Hales' daughter Lisa. He also makes appearances for charity, including annual visits to Alder Hey Children's Hospital.

When John Hales died in 2025, Neptune Collanges led the funeral procession from the church.
