= Denman (horse) =

21st-century Irish racehorse

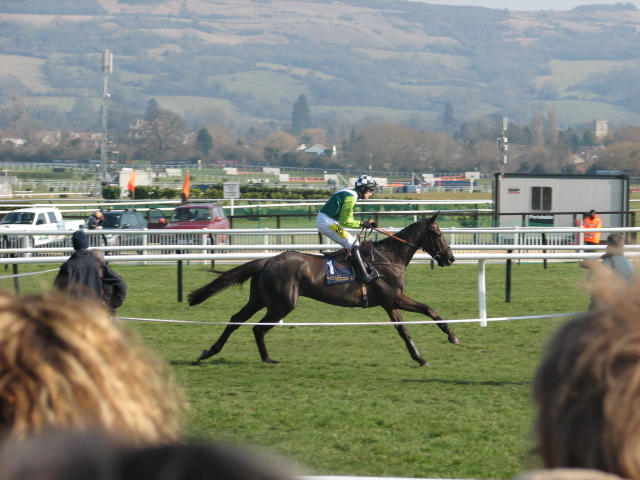
- Denman on 15 March 2006
- Sire: Presenting
- Grandsire: Mtoto
- Dam: Polly Puttens
- Damsire: Pollerton
- Sex: Gelding
- Foaled: 17 April 2000
- Died: 5 June 2018
- Country: Ireland
- Colour: Chestnut
- Breeder: Colman O'Flynn
- Owner: Paul Barber & Maggie Findlay
- Trainer: Paul Nicholls
- Record: 24:14–5–1
- Earnings: £1,141,347

Major wins
- Challow Novices' Hurdle (2006); Berkshire Novices' Chase (2006); Royal & SunAlliance Chase (2007); Hennessy Gold Cup (2007, 2009); Lexus Chase (2007); Aon Chase (2008); Cheltenham Gold Cup (2008)

Awards
- Timeform rating: 183

Honours
- Denman Chase at Newbury Racecourse
- Last updated on 29 January 2011

Denman (17 April 2000 – 5 June 2018) was an Irish-bred National Hunt racehorse sired by Presenting. Known as The Tank, Denman was widely known for his great rivalry with Kauto Star for the Cheltenham Gold Cup. This large horse with a front-running style won the Cheltenham Gold Cup in 2008.

== Background ==
Denman was a liver chestnut gelding, bred in County Cork by Colman O'Flynn, who also bred his Grade One winning full brother, Silverburn. He was sent to the 2004 Tattersalls Ireland Derby Sale as a four-year-old but this proved fruitless when one of the vets present said that the young "store" (a horse gelded early and intended for jump racing) could benefit from a hobday operation on his windpipe to improve his breathing.

== Racing career ==
=== 2004–2005 season ===
Denman was put in training with former jockey Adrian Maguire. Sent to the Duhallow point-to-point at Liscaroll and ridden by leading amateur Colman Sweeney, he was sent off 7/4 favourite to beat 16 rivals, which he did by 12 lengths. Tom O'Mahony, scout for Paul Barber (trainer Paul Nicholls' landlord and one of his main owners), was impressed, and a deal was completed to sell Denman to Paul Barber and gambler Harry Findlay and send him to Nicholls' stables in Somerset.

=== 2005–2006 season: Novice hurdles ===
Transferred to Paul Nicholls, Denman began his career under rules with two novice hurdle victories at Nicholls' local track Wincanton. He then scored a 21-length victory in the Grade 1 Challow Hurdle that was transferred from Newbury to Cheltenham, defeating useful horses such as Boychuk and Ungaro under stable jockey Ruby Walsh.

After an easy novice hurdle victory by Denman at Bangor, attentions moved on to the Cheltenham Festival for the Grade 1 Royal and Sun Alliance Novice Hurdle, where despite a strong field, Denman was sent off a 11/10 favourite. He ran a little free and lost to the Noel Meade-trained Nicanor and Paul Carberry. Ruby Walsh blamed himself for the defeat, saying that he should have made more use of the horse but didn't know him well enough at the time to do so.

=== 2006–2007 season: Novice chasing ===
Denman was immediately put away for the winter, and all attentions were switched to his novice chasing campaign the next season. He won his first four novice chases by a combined total of 59½l. The Jonjo O'Neill-trained subsequent Grand National winner Don't Push It, ridden by Tony McCoy, was the only horse to seriously threaten Denman, getting to within 3/4l of him after a battle up the Cheltenham hill.

For the second season in a row, Denman started a warm favourite for his Cheltenham Festival target. His connections put him in the Royal and Sun Alliance Novices Chase, for which he was sent off at odds of 6/5. Denman and Walsh went on from Aces Four at the fourth last fence and stormed 10l clear of Irish novice Snowy Morning. He was immediately installed as 4/1 2nd favourite behind his stablemate, the Gold Cup winner Kauto Star for the 2008 Gold Cup, and was put away for the season.

=== 2007–2008 season: senior chases ===
Denman's early season target was the Hennessy Cognac Gold Cup at Newbury on the first Saturday of December. Paul Nicholls was unable to get a prep run into him because of the ground throughout the country leading up to the race. Denman gave up at least a stone to his rivals in the long handicap racing off a rating of 161. He was reunited with jockey Sam Thomas (they had won the Berkshire Novices Chase at Newbury a year earlier on their only other start together) after Ruby Walsh dislocated his shoulder in a fall at Cheltenham two weeks previously.

Sent off at odds of 6/1 2nd fav, Denman tracked the leaders early before being sent on at the water jump by Thomas. From then on, he cruised 12l clear of Dream Alliance, who was in receipt of 18 lb weight. Immediately Denman was cut into 7/4 jf with his stablemate.

After a victory at the Leopardstown Christmas Festival in the Grade One Lexus Chase, where he defeated a strong field including Grade One winners The Listener and Beef or Salmon, and a 20l victory in the four-runner Grade Two Aon Chase, Denman was ready for the showdown with Kauto Star.

By this stage, Paul Nicholls' stable jockey Ruby Walsh had chosen to stay loyal to defending champion Kauto Star in the big race. Sam Thomas was booked for the ride on Denman. Kauto Star had a slightly interrupted preparation, but Nicholls was confident that both horses were 100% ready. Opinion throughout England and Ireland was divided on the race, and even Walsh confessed to being uncertain.

Twelve horses went to post for the big race. Kauto Star was sent off a well-backed 10/11 favourite, with Denman drifting slightly on the day to 9/4. By this time, this strapping, old-fashioned chaser had the nickname of "The Tank" for his relentless galloping and disdain for the fences he jumped. As the tapes rose, Denman tracked another stablemate, Neptune Collonges (Mick Fitzgerald), in 2nd, with Kauto Star sitting 5 lengths further back in 4th. Denman moved on at the 12th fence, and the pace increased a notch. At the 4th last, Kauto Star got his first reminder, which gave Denman a chance to pull clear and win by 7 lengths. He did not race again during the season.

=== 2008–2009 season ===
On 23 September 2008, it was revealed that Denman needed treatment for an irregular heartbeat. After treatment in Newmarket, which was successful, the horse returned to full training. Although entered for a race over hurdles over the Christmas period (in which he did not run), he made his reappearance at Kempton Park Racecourse on 7 February. Despite starting an odds-on favourite, he finished well beaten in second place behind Madison Du Berlais, and questions were asked as to whether he would regain his old form. He did not run again before he tried to retain the Gold Cup at Cheltenham in March.

Denman finished a 13l second in the 2009 Cheltenham Gold Cup behind Kauto Star. However, Paul Nicholls and Sam Thomas were very pleased with the run, considering everything that the horse had been through that winter.

He was taken to Aintree for the Totesport Bowl, where he fell at the second last while battling with Madison Du Berlais. This was his final race of the season.

=== 2009–2010 season ===
28 November 2009, saw the return of Denman in the Hennessy Gold Cup, shouldering 11 st 12 lb. Under Ruby Walsh, he won from stable companion What A Friend, who was receiving 22 lbs.

However, Denman's preparation for a Gold Cup rematch with Kauto Star took a hit at Newbury on 13 February, as Denman unseated his rider Tony McCoy, having been sent off as 1/6 favourite. The significance of this failure was not lost on the racing public and press, as McCoy had been booked to ride Denman in the Gold Cup, with Ruby Walsh again staying loyal to Kauto Star. The previously tight ante-post market for the 2010 Gold Cup clash between the rivals changed in reaction to Denman's poor run, with Kauto Star installed as a 4/7 favourite, whilst Denman was pushed out to 4/1. Neither won, with Kauto Star falling and Denman being beaten off up the run in by Nigel Twiston-Davies' Imperial Commander.

=== 2010–2011 season ===
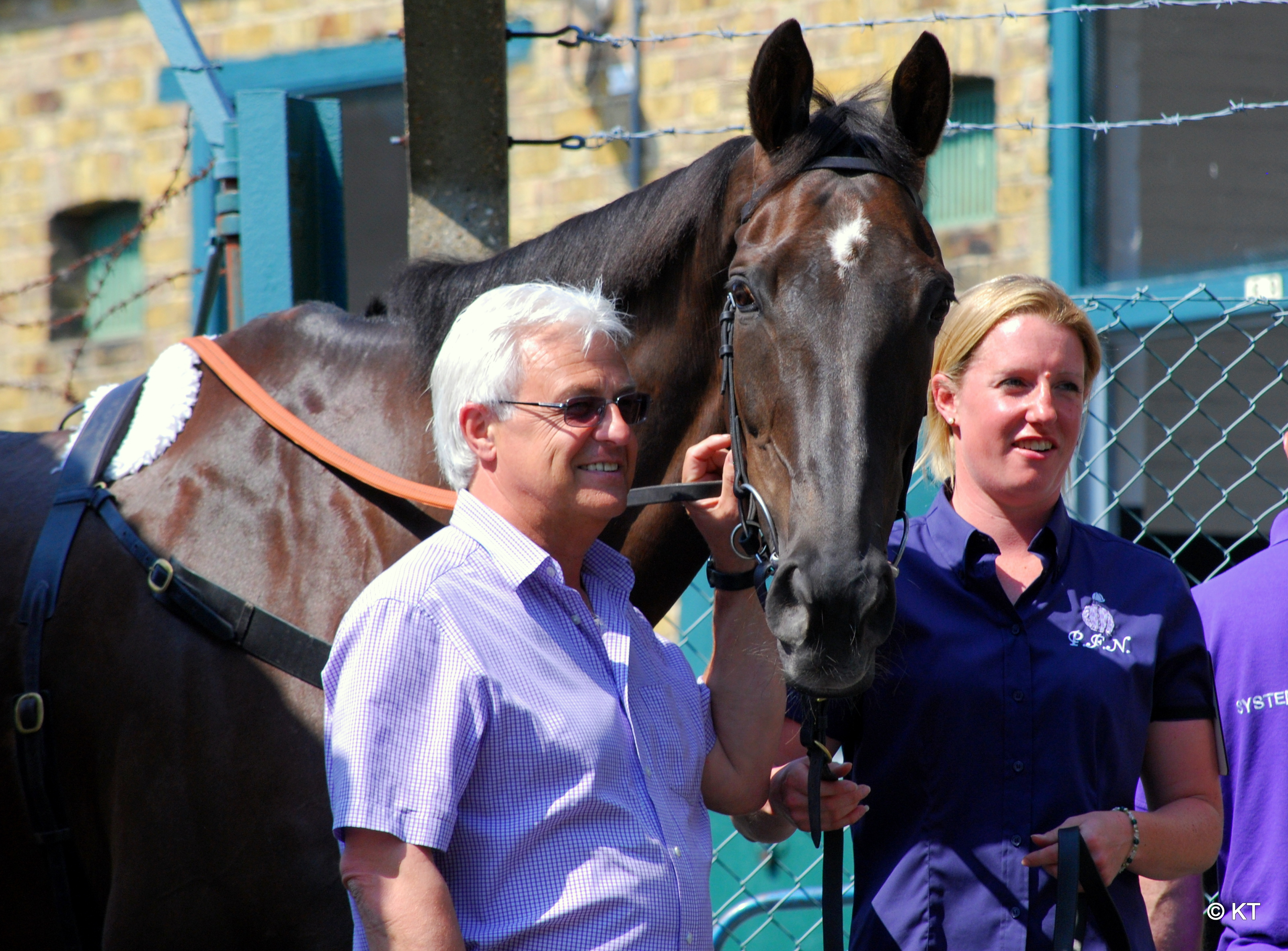
Denman at Sandown in April 2011.

27 November 2010, saw Denman trying to make history in the Hennessy Gold Cup. Only two other horses had won the race twice before, one of whom was Arkle. In trying to achieve an unprecedented third Hennessy, Denman for the third time had to shoulder 11 stone 12 pounds top weight. Only a handful of the field were in the handicap on official ratings, and the winner and second place runners carried bottom weight of 10 stone. Sam Thomas, who took the ride, replacing the injured Ruby Walsh, always kept him handy and out of trouble, but in the home straight, Diamond Harry matched strides and eventually passed Denman to win, with Burton Port staying on well into second place. Denman's trainer, Paul Nicholls, after the race was delighted with the run and informed the racing public that Denman would not be seen until the Cheltenham Gold Cup in March, where he would try to regain this prize which he last won in 2008.

On 20 February 2011, Nicholls reported that Denman had had a wind operation shortly after the Hennessy. The trainer felt that the horse had not been finishing his races as well as he could have been and so had him operated on well in advance of the Cheltenham Gold Cup. On the day of the 2011 Totesport Cheltenham Gold Cup, Denman drifted in the betting to 9–1, with the good going expected not to suit. With jockey Sam Thomas riding him further from the pace than had sometimes been the case, he took up the running at the 3rd last fence with Kauto Star. However, Long Run pulled alongside them at the 2nd last and went clear after the last. Denman finished second.

In April, he went back to Aintree for another go at the Totesport Bowl. Ruby Walsh chose not to be hard on the horse after it became apparent he wouldn't win. He finished 5th of the six runners behind the grey Nacarat. This turned out to be his last run.

== Retirement ==
Denman's retirement was announced on 9 December 2011 after he was injured in training for the Lexus Chase on 28 December 2011. Nicholls reassured Denman's fans that it was only a minor injury and if he was a youngster he would be back next year but because of his age, retirement was "the only course of action to take". Sam Thomas described him as "the best I am ever likely to ride," continuing that "on his day no horse would beat him". Newbury Racecourse, where Denman was a multiple winner, including his two Hennessys, stated that they would honour Denman by naming a race after him.

Formerly known as the Aon Chase, the Betfair Denman Chase was run at Newbury Racecourse on Betfair Free Friday in February 2012. It was won by 2011 Cheltenham Gold Cup winner Long Run.

Denman spent his retirement with keen equestrian rider Charlotte Alexander who not only paraded him in Retraining of Racehorse parades at Cheltenham but also enjoyed hunting with the Beaufort.

== Death ==
Denman was euthanized at Paul Nicholls' Ditcheat stables on 5 June 2018. Nicholls paid tribute to the horse, saying "He was tough, hardy and willing, wasn’t the easiest to train and would bite your hand off in his box given half a chance. He came along at the right time and was one of our superstars during a golden era for Team Ditcheat."

== Popular culture ==
Author Jilly Cooper met Denman as part of research forher 2010 novel Jump!

== Pedigree ==
Pedigree of Denman (IRE), chestnut gelding, 2000
Sire Presenting (GB) 1992	Mtoto (GB); 1983	Busted	Crepello
Sire Presenting (GB) 1992	Mtoto (GB); 1983	Busted	Sans le Sou
Sire Presenting (GB) 1992	Mtoto (GB); 1983	Amazer	Mincio
Sire Presenting (GB) 1992	Mtoto (GB); 1983	Amazer	Alzara
Sire Presenting (GB) 1992	D'Azy (IRE); 1984	Persian Bold	Bold Lad (IRE)
Sire Presenting (GB) 1992	D'Azy (IRE); 1984	Persian Bold	Relkarunner
Sire Presenting (GB) 1992	D'Azy (IRE); 1984	Belle Viking	Riverman
Sire Presenting (GB) 1992	D'Azy (IRE); 1984	Belle Viking	Velarta
Dam Polly Puttens (GB) 1982	Pollerton (GB); 1974	Rarity	Hethersett
Dam Polly Puttens (GB) 1982	Pollerton (GB); 1974	Rarity	Who Can Tell
Dam Polly Puttens (GB) 1982	Pollerton (GB); 1974	Nilie	Relko
Dam Polly Puttens (GB) 1982	Pollerton (GB); 1974	Nilie	Arctic Melody
Dam Polly Puttens (GB) 1982	My Puttens (IRE); 1972	David Jack	Pampered King
Dam Polly Puttens (GB) 1982	My Puttens (IRE); 1972	David Jack	Judy Owens
Dam Polly Puttens (GB) 1982	My Puttens (IRE); 1972	Railstown	Escart
Dam Polly Puttens (GB) 1982	My Puttens (IRE); 1972	Railstown	U (Family:4)
