= Savills Chase =

Steeplechase horse race in Ireland

Savills Chase
2025
Affordale Fury	I Am Maximus	Galopin Des Champs

Previous years
2024
Galopin Des Champs	Fact To File	Gentlemansgame
2023
Galopin Des Champs	Gerri Colombe	Capodanno
2022
Conflated	Kemboy	Fury Road
2021
Galvin	A Plus Tard	Kemboy

2020-2011
2020
A Plus Tard	Kemboy	Melon
2019
Delta Work	Monalee	Road To Respect
2018
Kemboy	Monalee	Road To Respect
2017
Road To Respect	Balko Des Flos	Outlander
2016
Outlander	Don Poli	Djakadam
2015
Don Poli	First Lieutenant	Foxrock
2014
Road To Riches	On His Own	Sam Winner
2013
Bobs Worth	First Lieutenant	Rubi Ball
2012
Tidal Bay	First Lieutenant	Flemenstar
2011
Synchronised	Rubi Light	Quito De La Roque

2010-2001
2010
Pandorama	Money Trix	Joncol
2009
What A Friend	Money Trix	Joncol
2008
Exotic Dancer	War Of Attrition	Cane Brake
2007
Denman	Mossbank	The Listener
2006
The Listener	Beef Or Salmon	War Of Attrition
2005
Beef Or Salmon	War Of Attrition	Forget The Past
2004
Beef Or Salmon	Best Mate	Pizarro
2003
Best Mate	Le Coudray	Beef Or Salmon
2002
Beef Or Salmon	Colonel Braxton	Harbour Pilot
2001
Foxchapel King	Native Upmanship	Alexander Banquet

2000-1991
2000
Rince Ri	Dorans Pride	Nick Dundee
1999
Rince Ri	Florida Pearl	Buck Rogers
1998
Dorans Pride	Boss Doyle	Buck Rogers
1997
Imperial Call	Merry Gale	Antonin
1996
Johnny Setaside	King Of The Gales	Opera Hat
1994
Commercial Artist	Nuaffe	Flashing Steel
1993
Deep Bramble	Flashing Steel	Force Seven
1992
General Idea	Cahervillahow	Garamycin
1991
Firions Law	Feroda	Laura's Beau

1990-1987
1990
Cahervillahow	Blitzkreig	Us And Joe
1989
Maid Of Money	Waterloo Boy	Super Furrow
1988
Maid Of Money	Wolf Of Badenoch	Bobsline
1987
Weather The Storm	Bobsline	Very Promising

The Savills Chase is a Grade 1 National Hunt steeplechase in Ireland which is open to horses aged five years or older. It is run at Leopardstown over a distance of about 3 miles (4,828 metres), and during its running there are seventeen fences to be jumped. The race is scheduled to take place each year during the Christmas Festival meeting in late December.

== History ==
It was first run over its present distance in 1992, when it became known as the Ericsson Chase. This replaced an earlier event, the Black and White Whisky Champion Chase, which had been run mostly over 2 1/2 miles since 1986. From 2004 to 2016 the race was sponsored by Lexus and run as the Lexus Chase. The company ended their sponsorship in November 2017 and the race was run as the Leopardstown Christmas Chase. In 2018 the property company Savills took over the sponsorship and the race was given its present title.

== Records ==
Most successful horse (3 wins):

- Beef Or Salmon – 2002, 2004, 2005

Leading jockey (4 wins):

- Paul Carberry – Dorans Pride (1998), Beef Or Salmon (2004, 2005), Pandorama (2010)

Leading trainer (5 wins):

- Michael Hourigan – Deep Bramble (1993), Dorans Pride (1998), Beef Or Salmon (2002, 2004, 2005)
- Noel Meade - Johnny Setaside (1995), Pandorama (2010), Road To Riches (2014), Road to Respect (2017), Affordale Fury (2025)

== Winners ==
Year	Winner	Age	Jockey	Trainer
1986	Very Promising	8	Richard Dunwoody	David Nicholson
1987	Weather the Storm	7	Tom Taaffe	Arthur Moore
1988	Maid of Money	6	Anthony Powell	John Fowler
1989	Maid of Money	7	Anthony Powell	John Fowler
1990	Cahervillahow	6	Charlie Swan	Mouse Morris
1991	Firions Law	6	Mickey Flynn	Victor Bowens
1992	General Idea	7	Brendan Sheridan	Dermot Weld
1993	Deep Bramble	6	Peter Niven	Michael Hourigan
1994	Commercial Artist	8	Graham Bradley	Victor Bowens
	no race 1995
1996	Johnny Setaside	7	Richard Dunwoody	Noel Meade
1997	Imperial Call	8	Conor O'Dwyer	Fergie Sutherland
1998	Dorans Pride	9	Paul Carberry	Michael Hourigan
1999	Rince Ri	6	Conor O'Dwyer	Ted Walsh
2000	Rince Ri	7	Ruby Walsh	Ted Walsh
2001	Foxchapel King	8	David Casey	Mouse Morris
2002	Beef Or Salmon	6	Timmy Murphy	Michael Hourigan
2003	Best Mate	8	Jim Culloty	Henrietta Knight
2004	Beef Or Salmon	8	Paul Carberry	Michael Hourigan
2005	Beef Or Salmon	9	Paul Carberry	Michael Hourigan
2006	The Listener	7	Daryl Jacob	Robert Alner
2007	Denman	7	Ruby Walsh	Paul Nicholls
2008	Exotic Dancer	8	Tony McCoy	Jonjo O'Neill
2009	What a Friend	6	Sam Thomas	Paul Nicholls
2010	Pandorama	7	Paul Carberry	Noel Meade
2011	Synchronised	8	Tony McCoy	Jonjo O'Neill
2012	Tidal Bay	11	Ruby Walsh	Paul Nicholls
2013	Bobs Worth	8	Barry Geraghty	Nicky Henderson
2014	Road To Riches	7	Bryan Cooper	Noel Meade
2015	Don Poli	6	Bryan Cooper	Willie Mullins
2016	Outlander	8	Jack Kennedy	Gordon Elliott
2017	Road To Respect	6	Sean Flanagan	Noel Meade
2018	Kemboy	6	David Mullins	Willie Mullins
2019	Delta Work	6	Jack Kennedy	Gordon Elliott
2020	A Plus Tard	6	Darragh O'Keefe	Henry de Bromhead
2021	Galvin	7	Davy Russell	Gordon Elliott
2022	Conflated	8	Jack Kennedy	Gordon Elliott
2023	Galopin Des Champs	7	Paul Townend	Willie Mullins
2024	Galopin Des Champs	8	Paul Townend	Willie Mullins
2025	Affordale Fury	7	Sam Ewing	Noel Meade

== See also ==
- Horse racing in Ireland
- List of Irish National Hunt races
