= 2018 Cheltenham Gold Cup =

- Cheltenham Gold Cup
- Location: Cheltenham Racecourse
- Date: 16 March 2018
- Winning horse: Native River
- Starting price: 5/1
- Jockey: Richard Johnson
- Trainer: Colin Tizzard
- Owner: Brocade Racing
- Conditions: Soft

The 2018 Cheltenham Gold Cup (known as the Timico Gold Cup for sponsorship reasons) was the 90th annual running of the Cheltenham Gold Cup horse race and was held at Cheltenham Racecourse on Friday 16 March 2018. The race was won by Native River.

== Details ==
- Sponsor: Timico
- Winner's prize money:
- Going: Soft
- Number of runners: 15
- Winner's time: 7m 2.60s

== Full result ==
| | * | Horse | Age | Jockey | Trainer ^{†} | SP |
| 1 | | Native River | 8 | Richard Johnson | Colin Tizzard | 5/1 |
| 2 | 4 1/2 | Might Bite | 9 | Nico de Boinville | Nicky Henderson | 4/1F |
| 3 | 4 | Anibale Fly | 8 | Barry Geraghty | Tony Martin (IRE) | 33/1 |
| 4 | 4 | Road to Respect | 7 | Sean Flanagan | Noel Meade (IRE) | 9/1 |
| 5 | 8 | Djakadam | 9 | Mr Patrick Mullins | Willie Mullins (IRE) | 25/1 |
| 6 | 18 | Definitly Red | 9 | Danny Cook | Brian Ellison | 8/1 |
| 7 | 1 1/2 | Tea For Two | 9 | Lizzie Kelly | Nick Williams | 50/1 |
| 8 | 7 | Edwulf | 9 | Mr Derek O'Connor | Joseph O'Brien (IRE) | 20/1 |
| 9 | 18 | American | 8 | Noel Fehily | Harry Fry | 25/1 |
| PU | | Outlander | 10 | Jack Kennedy | Gordon Elliott (IRE) | 10/1 |
| PU | | Our Duke | 8 | Robbie Power | Jessica Harrington (IRE) | 9/2 |
| PU | | Killultagh Vic | 9 | Paul Townend | Willie Mullins (IRE) | 8/1 |
| PU | | Saphir Du Rheu | 9 | Sam Twiston-Davies | Paul Nicholls | 66/1 |
| F | | Total Recall | 9 | David Mullins | Willie Mullins (IRE) | 14/1 |
| F | | Bachasson | 7 | Danny Mullins | Willie Mullins (IRE) | 33/1 |

- Amateur jockeys indicated by "Mr".

* The distances between the horses are shown in lengths or shorter. s.h. = short-head. nk = neck.
† Trainers are based in Great Britain unless indicated. PU = pulled-up. F = fell. UR = unseated rider
