= 2017 Cheltenham Gold Cup =

- Cheltenham Gold Cup
- Location: Cheltenham Racecourse
- Date: 17 March 2017
- Winning horse: Sizing John
- Starting price: 7/1
- Jockey: Robbie Power
- Trainer: Jessica Harrington
- Owner: Ann & Alan Potts
- Conditions: Good

The 2017 Cheltenham Gold Cup (known as the Timico Gold Cup for sponsorship reasons) was the 89th annual running of the Cheltenham Gold Cup horse race and was held at Cheltenham Racecourse on Friday 17 March 2017. It was won by Sizing John, ridden by Robbie Power and trained by Jessica Harrington. It was the first time that Robbie Power had ridden in the race and also the first time Jessica Harrington had an entry in the race.

== Details ==
- Sponsor: Timico
- Winner's prize money: £327,462
- Going: Good
- Number of runners: 13
- Winner's time: 6m 36.30s

== Result ==
	*	Horse	Age	Jockey	Trainer ^{†}	SP
1		Sizing John	7	Robbie Power	Jessica Harrington (IRE)	7/1
2	2 3/4	Minella Rocco	7	Noel Fehily	Jonjo O'Neill	18/1
3	s.h.	Native River	7	Richard Johnson	Colin Tizzard	7/2
4	1/2	Djakadam	8	Ruby Walsh	Willie Mullins (IRE)	3/1f
5	3	Saphir Du Rheu	8	Sam Twiston-Davies	Paul Nicholls	33/1
6	3 1/2	More Of That	9	Aidan Coleman	Jonjo O'Neill	14/1
7	10	Bristol De Mai	6	Daryl Jacob	Nigel Twiston-Davies	16/1
8	7	Smad Place	10	Wayne Hutchinson	Alan King	50/1
9	nk	Champagne West	9	Danny Mullins	Henry de Bromhead (IRE)	14/1
10	24	Outlander	9	Bryan Cooper	Gordon Elliott (IRE)	10/1
PU		Irish Cavalier	8	Paul Townend	Rebecca Curtis	66/1
F		Cue Card	11	Paddy Brennan	Colin Tizzard	9/2
UR		Tea For Two	8	Lizzie Kelly	Nick Williams	40/1

* The distances between the horses are shown in lengths or shorter. s.h. = short-head. nk = neck.
† Trainers are based in Great Britain unless indicated. PU = pulled-up. F = fell. UR = unseated rider
