= Sizing John =

British-bred Thoroughbred racehorse

- Racing silks of Alan & Ann Potts
- Sire: Midnight Legend
- Grandsire: Night Shift
- Dam: La Perrotine
- Damsire: Northern Crystal
- Sex: Gelding
- Foaled: 13 May 2010
- Country: United Kingdom
- Colour: Bay
- Breeder: Bryan & Sandra Mayoh, Eskdale Stud
- Owner: Alan & Ann Potts
- Trainer: Henry de Bromhead; Jessica Harrington
- Record: 21: 9-5-3
- Earnings: £776,806

Major wins
- Future Champions Novices Hurdle (2014); Craddockstown Novice Chase (2015); Kinloch Brae Chase (2017); Irish Gold Cup (2017); Cheltenham Gold Cup (2017); Punchestown Gold Cup (2017); John Durkan Memorial Punchestown Chase (2017)

Sizing John (foaled 13 May 2010) is a British-bred, Irish trained thoroughbred racehorse who competes in National Hunt racing. He is trained by Jessica Harrington and owned by Ann and Alan Potts, and is best known for winning the Cheltenham Gold Cup in 2017. He has been ridden in most of his races by Jonathon Burke, but has more recently been ridden Robbie Power, including all four of his Grade 1 wins over fences (the Cheltenham Gold Cup, the Irish Gold Cup, the Punchestown Gold Cup and the John Durkan Memorial Punchestown Chase, all in 2017). He also won a Grade 1 over Hurdles, the Future Champions Novice Hurdle at Leopardstown in 2014, and spent much of his early chasing career finishing second or third in races won by Douvan, widely regarded as one of the best chasers of recent times.

== Background ==
Sizing John is a dark bay gelding with tiny white socks on his hind legs, bred in North Yorkshire, England by Bryan & Sandra Mayoh of Eskdale Stud. As a foal he was sent to Ireland and put up for sale in November 2010 at Tattersalls where he was bought for €16,000 by John Bleahan. He eventually entered the ownership of Alan Potts and was sent into training with Henry de Bromhead at Knockeen, County Waterford. The colt was gelded as a yearling.

Sizing John was sired by Midnight Legend, a horse who raced successfully both on the flat and over hurdles winning the March Stakes, Glorious Stakes, Top Novices' Hurdle and Champion Novice Hurdle. As a breeding stallion he has sired several other good jumpers including Midnight Chase (Cotswold Chase) and Seeyouatmidnight (Rendlesham Hurdle, Dipper Novices' Chase). Sizing John's dam La Perrotine was a French-bred mare who showed some ability on the track, winning one National Hunt Flat race and three times over hurdles. Her dam Haratiyna was half-sister to the Italian Derby winner Houmayoun and a descendant of the Poule d'Essai des Pouliches winner Altissima.

Sizing John reportedly enjoys listening to music after exercise, displaying a particular fondness for Roar by Katy Perry.

== Racing career ==
=== 2013/2014 National Hunt season ===
Sizing John began his racing career in National Hunt Flat in the spring of 2014. Ridden by an amateur jockey he finished sixth at Limerick Racecourse in March and fourth to Forgotten Rules at Punchestown in April.

=== 2014/2015 National Hunt season ===
In the 2014/2015 National Hunt season Sizing John was campaigned in novice hurdle races and was ridden in all of his races by Jonathan "Johnny" Burke. On his first appearance over obstacles at Naas Racecourse on 2 November she started 5/2 favourite and won by two lengths from Phil's Magic. Three weeks later at Gowran Park he proved no match for the Willie Mullins-trained Douvan and was beaten twelve lengths into second place. In December he was stepped up in class for the Future Champions Novice Hurdle at Leopardstown Racecourse and started the 11/1 outsider in a five-runner field headed by Nichols Canyon. He led from the start and stayed on well over the last two hurdles to win by six and a half lengths from Sub Lieutenant.

On 10 March Sizing John made his first appearance at the Cheltenham Festival when he started a 25/1 outsider for the Supreme Novices' Hurdle. He took the lead at the second last but was overtaken approaching the finalobstacle and finished third behind Douvan and Shaneshill. On his final appearance of the season he faced Douvan again in the Herald Champion Novice Hurdle at Punchestown in April and was beaten seven and a half lengths into second by his rival.

=== 2015/2016 National Hunt season ===
Sizing John began the 2015/2016 National Hunt season by competing in novice chases and made a successful debut over fences by winning at Punchestown in October at odds of 2/11. In the following month he stepped up to Group 2 class and started favourite for the Craddockstown Novice Chase at the same track. He disputed the lead from the start, drew clear of his opponents approaching the final fence and won "comfortably" by eight lengths from the Gordon Elliott-trained Lord Scoundrel. Henry de Bromhead commented "I'm delighted with that. It was a super ride by Johnny and he jumped great... I'd be in no rush to step him up in trip, but he does look like a horse that will go further".

For the rest of the season, Sizing John's path to major success was repeatedly blocked by Douvan. He finished second to the Mullins champion in the Racing Post Novice Chase at Leopardstown in December and the Arkle Challenge Trophy at the Cheltenham Festival in March before ending his season by running third behind Douvan and The Game Changer in the Ryanair Novice Chase at Punchestown on 28 April. In between the last two races he was moved up in distance and started favourite for the Manifesto Novices' Chase over two and a half miles at Aintree but appeared to tire in the closing stages and finished third behind Arzal and L'Ami Serge.

=== 2016/2017 National Hunt season ===
Before the start of the next season, Sizing John was transferred to the stable of Jessica Harrington at Moone, County Kildare. Robbie Power took over from Burke as his regular jockey.

On his first appearance for his new trainer Sizing John was beaten by Douvan for the seventh time when he finished second behind his old rival in the Grade 1 Paddy Power Cashcard Chase at Leopardstown in December. The gelding was then moved up in distance for the Kinloch Brae Chase over two and a half miles at Thurles Racecourse on 19 January and started third favourite behind Sub Lieutenant and Black Hercules (Golden Miller Novices' Chase). After being restrained by Power in third place he produced a strong finish, staying on well to take the lead on the run-in and winning by two and a half lengths from Sub Lieutenant.

Sizing John was stepped up again in distance for the Irish Gold Cup over three miles at Leopardstown on 12 February. He was made the 100/30 second favourite behind Don Poli in a seven-runner field which also included Carlingford Lough (winner of the race for the last two years), Empire of Dirt (Mildmay of Flete Challenge Cup), More Of That, Road To Riches (Galway Plate, Lexus Chase) and Minella Rocco (National Hunt Chase Challenge Cup). Road To Riches set the early pace before giving way to Don Poli with Sizing John racing close behind before making progress approaching the second last. Sizing John overtook Don Poli at the last fence and held off a sustained challenge from Empire of Dirt to win by three quarters of a length. After the race Harrington said "He was just brilliant. He was still cantering turning in, as far as I could see, and when he asked him he quickened up. I know he didn't win very far, but he still won and he wasn't stopping... He looks like a three-mile chaser rather than a two-miler".

On 17 March Sizing John, racing over three and a quarter miles, attempted to become the first horse since Imperial Call in 1996 to win both the Irish Gold Cup and the Cheltenham Gold Cup in the same season. Djakadam headed the betting from Native River (Hennessy Gold Cup, Welsh Grand National) and Cue Card with Sizing John fourth choice on 7/1. More Of That and Minella Rocco were again in opposition along with Outlander (Lexus Chase), Champagne West (Thyestes Chase), Bristol de Mai (Scilly Isles Novices' Chase, Peter Marsh Chase), Saphir du Rheu (Mildmay Novices' Chase), Smad Place (Hennessy Gold Cup, Cotswold Chase), Irish Cavalier (Charlie Hall Chase) and Tea For Two (Kauto Star Novices' Chase). Sizing John raced in mid-division before beginning to make progress at the fourth last and moved up to join the leaders Djakadam and Native River at the second last. He took the lead, established a clear advantage approaching the final fence and stayed on up the run-in to win by two and three-quarter lengths from the fast-finishing Minella Rocco. Native River and Djakadam were just behind in third and fourth.

For his final race of the 2016-17 season Sizing John was sent off the 9/10 favourite for the Punchestown Gold Cup over three miles at Punchestown on 26 April. He was opposed again by Djakadam, Outlander and Champagne West as well as the 2016 Cheltenham Gold Cup winner Coneygree and Flemenstar, winner of the Racing Post Novice Chase, Arkle Novice Chase and John Durkan Memorial Punchestown Chase in 2012. Sizing John was held up in the rear of the field early on and moved up to close on the leaders, Djakadam and Coneygree, at the final fence. Djakadam made a slight mistake at the last and Sizing John stayed on strongly to win by a short head from Djakadam at the finish with Coneygree third. Harrington commented after the race "He was never travelling the way he did at Cheltenham, but pure guts got him there".

=== 2017/2018 National Hunt season ===
On 10 December 2017, Sizing John made a winning start to the season in the John Durkan Memorial Punchestown Chase with Djakadam once again in second place. His second and what proved to be his last appearance of the season was on 28 December in the Leopardstown Christmas Chase in which he came home in 7th place with Road to Respect the victor. Injury curtailed his season and he was unable to defend his crown at Cheltenham for the Gold Cup of 2018.

=== 2018/2019 National Hunt season ===
More injury setbacks for Sizing John as he was ruled out for the whole season.

=== 2019/2020 National Hunt season ===
After an absence of 733 days, Sizing John finally returned to a racetrack on 31 December 2019 for the Bet With Tote At Punchestown Hurdle. Seemingly going well, he came to grief with two hurdles remaining which was the first time he had ever fallen.

== Pedigree ==
Pedigree of Sizing John (GB), bay gelding, 2010
Sire Midnight Legend (GB) 1991	Night Shift (USA); 1980	Northern Dancer	Nearctic
Sire Midnight Legend (GB) 1991	Night Shift (USA); 1980	Northern Dancer	Natalma
Sire Midnight Legend (GB) 1991	Night Shift (USA); 1980	Ciboulette	Chop Chop
Sire Midnight Legend (GB) 1991	Night Shift (USA); 1980	Ciboulette	Windy Answer
Sire Midnight Legend (GB) 1991	Myth (GB); 1983	Troy	Petingo
Sire Midnight Legend (GB) 1991	Myth (GB); 1983	Troy	La Milo
Sire Midnight Legend (GB) 1991	Myth (GB); 1983	Hay Reef	Mill Reef
Sire Midnight Legend (GB) 1991	Myth (GB); 1983	Hay Reef	Haymaking
Dam La Perrotine (FR) 2000	Northern Crystal (GB); 1988	Crystal Glitters	Blushing Groom
Dam La Perrotine (FR) 2000	Northern Crystal (GB); 1988	Crystal Glitters	Tales to Tell
Dam La Perrotine (FR) 2000	Northern Crystal (GB); 1988	North Cliff	Green Dancer
Dam La Perrotine (FR) 2000	Northern Crystal (GB); 1988	North Cliff	Nenana Road
Dam La Perrotine (FR) 2000	Haratiyna (FR); 1986	Top Ville	High Top
Dam La Perrotine (FR) 2000	Haratiyna (FR); 1986	Top Ville	Sega Ville
Dam La Perrotine (FR) 2000	Haratiyna (FR); 1986	Halwah	The Minstrel
Dam La Perrotine (FR) 2000	Haratiyna (FR); 1986	Halwah	Herila (Family 8-f)
