= Many Clouds Chase =

Steeplechase horse race in Britain

- Class: Grade 2
- Location: Aintree Racecourse; Merseyside, England
- Inaugurated: 2011
- Race type: Steeplechase
- Sponsor: William Hill
- Website: Aintree

Race information
- Distance: 3m 210y (5,020 metres)
- Surface: Turf
- Track: Left-handed
- Qualification: Four-years-old and up
- Weight: 10 st 6 lb (4yo); 11 st 0 lb (5yo+); Allowances; 7 lb for fillies &mares Penalties; 6 lb for G1 or G2 winners* 4 lb for Listed or G3 winners* *Half penalties for novice and beginners chase wins
- Purse: £50,000 (2020); 1st: £28,135

Many Clouds Chase
2022
| Noble Yeats | Dashel Drasher | Ahoy Senor |

Previous years
2021
| Protektorat | Native River | Sam Brown |

2020-2011
2020
Lake View Lad | Santini | Native River
2019
Native River | Black Corton | Outlander
2018
Definitly Red | Double Shuffle | Acdc
2017
Definitly Red | Cloudy Dream | Flying Angel
2016
Many Clouds | Le Mercurey | Irish Cavalier
2015
Don Poli | Many Clouds | Menorah
2014
Sam Winner | Medermit | Ma Filleule
2013
Unioniste | Wishfull Thinking | Our Mick
2012
Wayward Prince | Across The Bay | Quito De La Roque
2011
Master Of The Hall | Tamarinbleu | Nacarat

The Many Clouds Chase is a Grade Two National Hunt steeplechase in Great Britain which is open to horses aged four years or older. It is run at Aintree over a distance of about 3 miles and 1 furlong (3 miles and 210 yards, or 5,020 metres), and during its running there are nineteen fences to be jumped. It is scheduled to take place each year in early December.

The race was first run as a Listed race in 2011. It was awarded Grade Two status and renamed in honour of Many Clouds in 2017.

In April 2023 the British Horseracing Authority announced the removal of the race from the 2023/24 programme.

== Winners ==
| Year | Winner | Age | Jockey | Trainer |
|---|---|---|---|---|
| 2011 | Master Of The Hall | 7 | Barry Geraghty | Nicky Henderson |
| 2012 | Wayward Prince | 8 | Jack Doyle | Hilary Parrott |
| 2013 | Unioniste | 5 | Sam Twiston-Davies | Paul Nicholls |
| 2014 | Sam Winner | 7 | Nick Scholfield | Paul Nicholls |
| 2015 | Don Poli | 6 | Bryan Cooper | Willie Mullins |
| 2016 | Many Clouds | 9 | Leighton Aspell | Oliver Sherwood |
| 2017 | Definitly Red | 8 | Danny Cook | Brian Ellison |
| 2018 | Definitly Red | 9 | Danny Cook | Brian Ellison |
| 2019 | Native River | 9 | Richard Johnson | Colin Tizzard |
| 2020 | Lake View Lad | 10 | Brian Hughes | Nick Alexander |
| 2021 | Protektorat | 6 | Bridget Andrews | Dan Skelton |
| 2022 | Noble Yeats | 7 | Sean Bowen | Emmet Mullins |

== See also ==
- Horse racing in Great Britain
- List of British National Hunt races
