= 2016 Cheltenham Gold Cup =

- Cheltenham Gold Cup
- Location: Cheltenham Racecourse
- Date: 18 March 2016
- Winning horse: Don Cossack
- Starting price: 9/4 F
- Jockey: Bryan Cooper
- Trainer: Gordon Elliott
- Owner: Gigginstown House Stud
- Conditions: Good

The 2016 Cheltenham Gold Cup (known as the Timico Gold Cup for sponsorship reasons) was the 88th annual running of the Cheltenham Gold Cup horse race and was held at Cheltenham Racecourse on Friday 18 March 2016.

The race was won by the 9 to 4 favourite, Don Cossack, owned by Ryanair CEO Michael O'Leary's Gigginstown House Stud, trained by Gordon Elliott in Ireland, and ridden by Bryan Cooper. The race gave Elliott and Cooper a first victory in the Cheltenham Gold Cup. Don Cossack won by 4½ lengths from Djakadam, with Don Poli a further 10 lengths behind in third place. All three placed horses were trained in Ireland.

== Details ==
- Sponsor: Timico
- Winner's prize money: £327,462.00
- Going: Good.
- Number of runners: 9
- Winner's time: 6 mins 35.00 secs

== Result ==
	*	Horse	Age	Jockey	Trainer ^{†}	SP
1		Don Cossack	9	Bryan Cooper	Gordon Elliott (Ire)	9/4 Fav
2	4 1/2	Djakadam	7	Ruby Walsh	Willie Mullins (Ire)	9/2
3	10	Don Poli	7	Davy Russell	Willie Mullins (Ire)	9/2
4	7	Carlingford Lough	7	Barry Geraghty	John Kiely (Ire)	25/1
5	nse	Irish Cavalier	10	Paul Townend	Rebecca Curtis	66/1
6	16	Smad Place	9	Wayne Hutchinson	Alan King	10/1
7	15	O'Faolains Boy	9	Noel Fehily	Rebecca Curtis	50/1
8	1 1/2	On His Own	12	Mr Patrick Mullins	Willie Mullins (Ire)	50/1
F		Cue Card	10	Paddy Brennan	Colin Tizzard	5/2

- Amateur jockeys indicated by "Mr".

* The distances between the horses are shown in lengths or shorter. shd = short-head.
† Trainers are based in Great Britain unless indicated. PU = pulled-up. NR = non-runner.
