= Many Clouds =

Irish-bred Thoroughbred racehorse

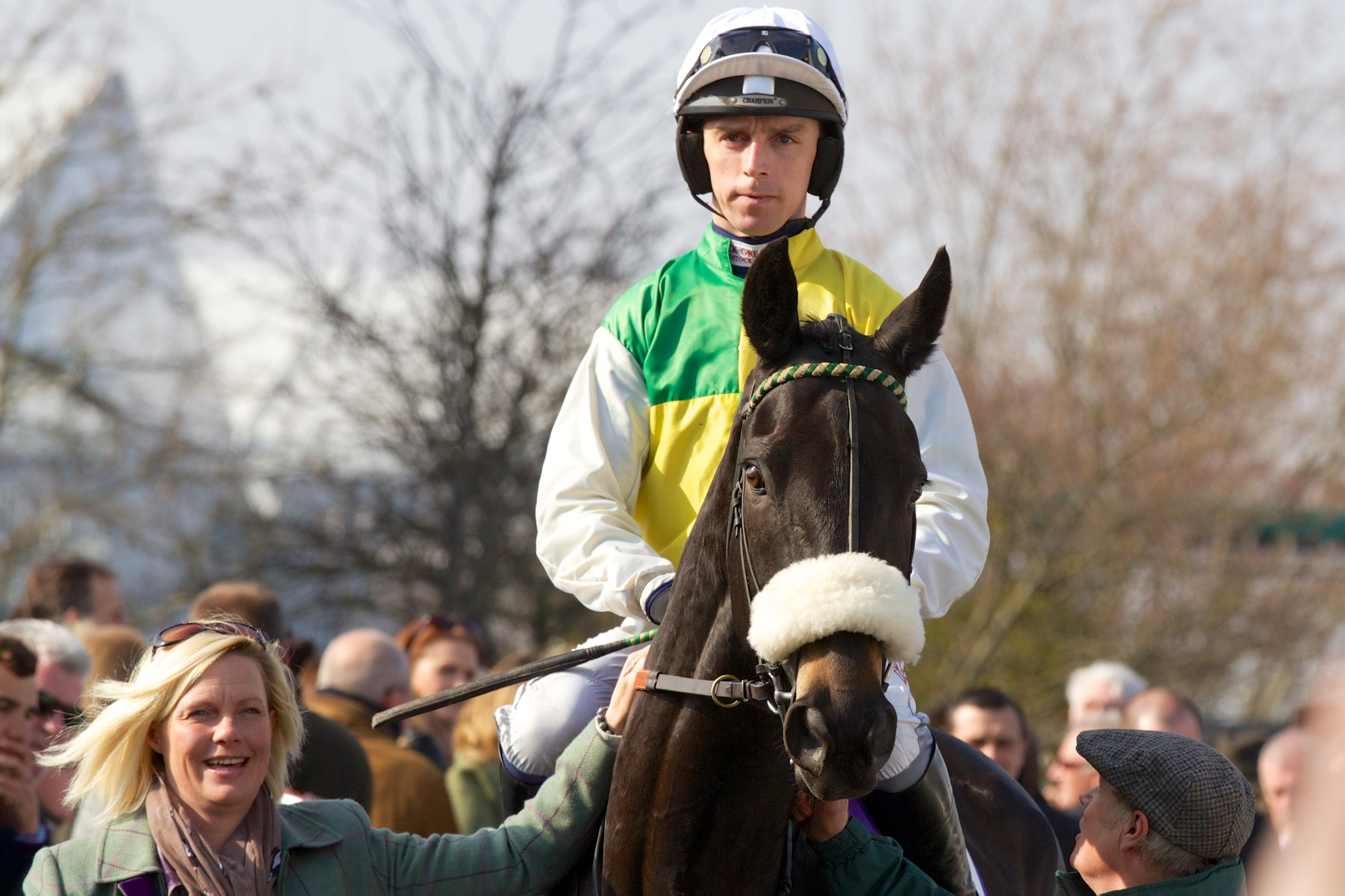
- Leighton Aspell and Many Clouds in 2014
- Sire: Cloudings
- Grandsire: Sadler's Wells
- Dam: Bobbing Back
- Damsire: Bob Back
- Sex: Gelding
- Foaled: 21 April 2007
- Died: 28 January 2017 (aged 9)
- Country: Ireland
- Colour: Brown
- Breeder: Aidan Aherne
- Owner: Trevor Hemmings
- Trainer: Oliver Sherwood
- Record: 27: 12-7-0
- Earnings: £928,000

Major wins
- Hennessy Gold Cup (2014); Cotswold Chase (2015, 2017); Grand National (2015)

Awards
- British Jump Racing Horse of the Year (2015)

Honours
- Many Clouds Chase at Aintree

Many Clouds (21 April 2007 – 28 January 2017) was an Irish-bred, British-trained Thoroughbred racehorse best known for winning the 2015 Grand National. After being sold as a foal, he was sent to England and trained for a National Hunt racing career by Oliver Sherwood.

He won a National Hunt Flat race and two Novice hurdle races before moving to steeplechases as a six-year-old in the autumn of 2013. In his first season over fences, he won twice as well as finishing second in the Grade 2 Reynoldstown Novices' Chase and fourth in the Grade 1 Mildmay Novices' Chase. He emerged as a top-class chaser in the following season, winning his first three races including the Hennessy Gold Cup and the Cotswold Chase before disappointing when strongly fancied for the Cheltenham Gold Cup. On 11 April 2015, ridden as in all of his previous races by Leighton Aspell, he carried 11 stone 9 pound to victory in the Grand National at Aintree Racecourse.

Many Clouds won one race in the following season but finished unplaced when joint-favourite for the 2016 Grand National. In January 2017, he beat the previously undefeated Thistlecrack in winning his second Cotswold Chase but collapsed and died of an exercise-induced pulmonary hemorrhage shortly after crossing the finish line. He was subsequently assessed as the leading staying steeplechaser in Britain and Ireland for the 2016–17 season.

== Background ==
Many Clouds was a "big, old-fashioned" brown gelding bred in Ireland by Aidan Aherne at the Windward House Stud in County Cork. He was one of several good jumpers sired by Cloudings, a son of Sadler's Wells, who won the Prix Lupin in 1997. Many Clouds' dam, Bobbing Back, has also produced The Tullow Tank, winner of the Royal Bond Novice Hurdle and the Future Champions Novice Hurdle.

In November 2007, Many Clouds was consigned as a colt foal to the Tattersalls sales where he was bought for €6,000 by Highflyer Bloodstock. Many Clouds was trained throughout his racing career by Oliver Sherwood at Upper Lambourn in Berkshire and ridden in all of his races by Leighton Aspell.

== Racing career ==
=== 2011–12 National Hunt season ===
Many Clouds began his racing career in National Hunt Flat races. He won on his debut at Wetherby Racecourse in February but then finished behind Champagne Fever at the Cheltenham Festival in March and behind The New One at Aintree in April.

=== 2012–13 National Hunt season ===
In his second season, Many Clouds ran in Novice hurdle races. After finishing second at Aintree in October, he won over two and a half miles at Ascot Racecourse a month later. He went on to finish second at Wetherby and win at Exeter Racecourse before being moved up in class and finishing second in the Grade 3 European Breeders' Fund Novices' Handicap Hurdle Final at Sandown Park in March. On his final start of the season, he was matched against more experienced hurdlers in the Injured Jockeys Fund Handicap Hurdle at Aintree in April but was pulled up by Aspell two flights from home.

=== 2013–14 National Hunt season ===
Many Clouds began to race over fences in the following season, competing in novice chases. On his debut over the larger obstacles, he won over two and a half miles at Carlisle Racecourse in November, beating the highly regarded Holywell into third place. Later that month, he finished second to Black Thunder at Haydock Park before winning at odds of 8/15 at Wetherby in December. At Ascot on 15 February he was stepped up in class for the Grade 2 Reynoldstown Novices' Chase and finished second, beaten two and a half lengths by O'Faolains Boy. He made his second appearance at the Cheltenham Festival in March when he started a 16/1 outsider for the Grade 1 RSA Chase in which he was brought down at the fourteenth fence. He ended his first season as a chaser by finishing fourth to Holywell in the Mildmay Novices' Chase at Aintree.

=== 2014–15 National Hunt season ===
Many Clouds began his next season in the Colin Parker Memorial Chase at Carlisle in November. He took the lead three fences from the finish and won from the favourite Eduard (winner of the Future Champion Novices' Chase), with Holywell fifteen lengths back in third. Later that month, Many Clouds was assigned a weight of 11 stone 6 pounds for the 58th running of the Hennessy Gold Cup over three and a quarter miles at Newbury Racecourse. Starting at odds of 8/1 in a nineteen-runner field, he took the lead at the last fence and stayed on strongly to win by three and a quarter lengths form Houblon des Obeaux. Aspell was given a seven-day ban for excessive use of the whip on the winner. Sherwood, however, who was winning the race for the first time since Arctic Call's victory in 1990, said, "It was a great ride from Leighton. I am chuffed to bits, he is a very tough horse and I am delighted for the whole team."

In January, Many Clouds started at odds of 4/1 for the Grade 2 Cotswold Chase at Cheltenham. He disputed the lead from the start and stayed on strongly over the last two fences to win from Smad Place, Dynaste, The Giant Bolster, and Black Thunder. The performance established Many Clouds as a leading contender for the Cheltenham Gold Cup. After the race Sherwood said, "I think he's improved again and his confidence is sky-high. Leighton was adamant there would be no pace and he would be handy. I think he was dossing after the last, there's a bit more to come and he's a live Gold Cup horse." On 13 March, Many Clouds started joint-second-favourite at odds of 7/1 in a sixteen-runner field for the Cheltenham Gold Cup. After racing in mid-division, he stayed on in the closing stages without ever looking likely to win and finished sixth behind Coneygree.

For the Grand National on 11 April Many Clouds was assigned a weight of 11 stone 9 pounds (163 pounds), one pound below the topweight Lord Windermere. Sherwood had wanted to wait until the following year to run the horse in the race but was over-ruled by Hemmings and Aspell. Starting at odds of 25/1, he was close behind the leaders for most of the way before taking the lead five fences from the finish when The Druid's Nephew fell. He went three lengths clear at the last and held on to win by one and three quarter lengths from the French-bred Saint Are, with Monbeg Dude six lengths back in third. The winning time of 8 minutes 56.8 seconds was the second fastest in the race's history. No horse had carried a higher weight to victory since Red Rum in 1974. He is also the first horse to win both the Hennessy Gold Cup and Grand National in the same season. The horse appeared somewhat distressed after crossing the line, and Aspell dismounted rather than riding the horse into the winner's enclosure, but he quickly recovered and was reported to be "bucking and kicking" in his paddock on the following morning. Aspell said, "I asked him some big questions and he has dug really deep. I tried to conserve energy because he had a hard race in the Gold Cup and it's a wonderful training performance by Oliver to freshen him up and recharge the batteries. He's all heart and he gave me the best ride I have ever had over these fences. I was just hoping that the battery life would last."

=== 2015–16 National Hunt season ===
On his first appearance since his Aintree win, Many Clouds started the 9/2 third favourite for the Charlie Hall Chase at Wetherby but finished last of the six finishers behind Cue Card. At Aintree in December, he finished second to the Irish-trained Don Poli, to whom he was conceding five pounds. Many Clouds then attempted to repeat his 2015 success in the Cotswold Chase and finished second to Smad Place. His final prep race for the Grand National was intended to be a chase at Kelso Racecourse on 5 March but the meeting was abandoned and rearranged to take place eight days later. Starting the 11/10 favourite Many Clouds took the lead at the fourth fence and went on to win by ten lengths from Unioniste. Starting as 8/1 joint favourite, he finished in 16th place at the Grand National, behind winner Rule the World.

=== 2016–17 National Hunt season ===
In his first race since the Grand National, Many Clouds won on his return to Aintree in December, beating Le Mercurey by three and a half lengths. On 28 January 2017 Many Clouds attempted to repeat his 2015 success in the Cotswold Chase at Cheltenham and started at odds of 8/1 in a seven-runner field which included Thistlecrack (the 4/9 favourite), Smad Place, and Silviniaco Conti. After jumping well throughout the race, Many Clouds took the lead four fences from the finish and fought off the sustained challenge of Thistlecrack to win by a head in a photo-finish. After crossing the finish line Many Clouds collapsed and was pronounced dead by veterinary staff shortly afterwards. Oliver Sherwood commented, "I always said he'd die for you, and he has today, doing what he loved most. He wanted to win that race, by God he wanted to win it – he was beat at the last and he fought the last 50 yards to get up and win. I've trained for 32 years now and horses like that don't come along very often". A post-mortem examination revealed that he had died as a result of a "severe" exercise-induced pulmonary hemorrhage. The vets who carried out the post-mortem also concluded there were no underlying health issues and no connection with incidents where he was unsteady on his feet after previous races. In May 2017 the senior handicappers of Britain and Ireland named Many Clouds the leading staying steeplechaser of the 2016–17 season, rating him two pounds higher than Cheltenham Gold Cup winner Sizing John.

== Pedigree ==
Pedigree of Many Clouds (IRE), bay gelding, 2007
Sire Cloudings (IRE) 1994	Sadler's Wells (USA); 1981	Northern Dancer	Nearctic
Sire Cloudings (IRE) 1994	Sadler's Wells (USA); 1981	Northern Dancer	Natalma
Sire Cloudings (IRE) 1994	Sadler's Wells (USA); 1981	Fairy Bridge	Bold Reason
Sire Cloudings (IRE) 1994	Sadler's Wells (USA); 1981	Fairy Bridge	Special
Sire Cloudings (IRE) 1994	Ispahan (IRE); 1981	Rusticaro	Caro
Sire Cloudings (IRE) 1994	Ispahan (IRE); 1981	Rusticaro	Rustica
Sire Cloudings (IRE) 1994	Ispahan (IRE); 1981	Royal Danseuse	Prince Chevalier
Sire Cloudings (IRE) 1994	Ispahan (IRE); 1981	Royal Danseuse	Star Dancer
Dam Bobbing Back (IRE) 1997	Bob Back (USA); 1981	Roberto	Hail To Reason
Dam Bobbing Back (IRE) 1997	Bob Back (USA); 1981	Roberto	Bramalea
Dam Bobbing Back (IRE) 1997	Bob Back (USA); 1981	Toter Back	Carry Back
Dam Bobbing Back (IRE) 1997	Bob Back (USA); 1981	Toter Back	Romantic Miss
Dam Bobbing Back (IRE) 1997	Ballyvooney (GB); 1986	Salluceva	Sallust
Dam Bobbing Back (IRE) 1997	Ballyvooney (GB); 1986	Salluceva	Aliceva
Dam Bobbing Back (IRE) 1997	Ballyvooney (GB); 1986	Leveret	Le Bavard
Dam Bobbing Back (IRE) 1997	Ballyvooney (GB); 1986	Leveret	Merry Palm (Family 22)
