= Denman Chase =

Steeplechase horse race in Britain

Denman Chase
2026
Haiti Couleurs	L'Homme Presse	Leave Of Absence

Previous years
2025
Djelo	Hitman	Bravemansgame
2024
Shishkin	Hitman	Protektorat
2023
Zanza	Hitman	Does He Know
2022
Eldorado Allen	Royale Pagaille	Clan Des Obeaux
2021
Secret Investor	Clan Des Obeaux	Kalashnikov

2020-2011
2020
Native River	Secret Investor	Might Bite
2019
Clan Des Obeaux	Terrefort	Ballyhill
2018
Native River	Cloudy Dream	Saphir Du Rheu
2017
Native River	Le Mercurey	Bristol De Mai
2016
Houblon Des Obeaux	The Giant Bolster	Splash of Ginge
2015
Coneygree	Houblon Des Obeaux	Unioniste
2014
Harry Topper	Al Ferof	Katenko
2013
Silviniaco Conti	The Giant Bolster	Menorah
2012
Long Run	Burton Port	What A Friend
2011
Noland	What A Friend	Fair Along

2010-2000
2010
Tricky Trickster	Niche Market	Air Force One
2009
Madison Du Berlais	Denman	Albertas Run
2008
Denman	Regal Heights	Celestial Gold
2007
Kauto Star	L'ami	Royal Auclair
2005
Farmer Jack	Strong Flow	Celestial Gold
2004
Shooting Light	Irish Hussar	Keen Leader
2003
Valley Henry	Chives	Truckers Tavern
2002
Bacchanal	Native Emperor	Deano's Beeno
2001
Shotgun Willy	First Gold	Kingsmark
2000
See More Business	Macgeorge	Tresor De Mai

The Denman Chase is a Grade 2 National Hunt steeplechase in Great Britain which is open to horses aged five years or older. It is run at Newbury over a distance of about 2 miles and 7½ furlongs (2 miles 7 furlongs and 86 yards, or 4,706 metres), and during its running there are eighteen fences to be jumped. The race is scheduled to take place each year in February.

The event was originally named the Aon Chase, after its first sponsors Aon Group Ltd, and it was first run in 2000. It was promoted to Listed status in 2002, and to Grade 2 level in 2003. The planned running in 2009 was abandoned at Newbury because of snow, and so the race was switched to an alternative venue, Kempton Park. The rearranged event was titled the Levy Board Chase. In 2012 the sponsorship was taken over by Betfair and renamed the Denman Chase in honour of Denman, who won the race in 2008 and also won two Hennessy Gold Cups at Newbury.

The race serves as one of the principal trials for the Cheltenham Gold Cup in March. Four horses have won both events in the same year – Kauto Star (2007), Denman (2008), Coneygree (2015) and Native River (2018).

== Records ==
Most successful horse (3 wins):

- Native River – 2017, 2018, 2020

Leading jockey (4 wins):

- Richard Johnson – Shooting Light (2004), Farmer Jack (2005), Coneygree (2015), Native River (2018)

Leading trainer (10 wins):

- Paul Nicholls (horse racing) – See More Business (2000), Shotgun Willy (2001), Valley Henry (2003), Kauto Star (2007), Denman (2008), Tricky Trickster (2010), Noland (2011), Silvianaco Conti (2013), Clan Des Obeaux (2019), Secret Investor (2021)

== Winners ==
Year	Winner	Age	Jockey	Trainer
2000	See More Business	10	Mick Fitzgerald	Paul Nicholls
2001	Shotgun Willy	7	Joe Tizzard	Paul Nicholls
2002	Bacchanal	8	Mick Fitzgerald	Nicky Henderson
2003	Valley Henry	8	Barry Geraghty	Paul Nicholls
2004	Shooting Light	11	Richard Johnson	Martin Pipe
2005	Farmer Jack	9	Richard Johnson	Philip Hobbs
2006	Abandoned due to frost
2007	Kauto Star	7	Ruby Walsh	Paul Nicholls
2008	Denman	8	Sam Thomas	Paul Nicholls
2009 (Note: The 2009 running took place at Kempton Park)	Madison du Berlais	8	Tom Scudamore	David Pipe
2010	Tricky Trickster	7	Ruby Walsh	Paul Nicholls
2011	Noland	10	Tony McCoy	Paul Nicholls
2012	Long Run	7	Sam Waley-Cohen (Note: amateur jockey)	Nicky Henderson
2013	Silviniaco Conti	7	Ruby Walsh	Paul Nicholls
2014	Harry Topper	7	Jason Maguire	Kim Bailey
2015	Coneygree	8	Richard Johnson	Mark Bradstock
2016	Houblon des Obeaux	9	Aidan Coleman	Venetia Williams
2017	Native River	7	Aidan Coleman	Colin Tizzard
2018	Native River	8	Richard Johnson	Colin Tizzard
2019 (Note: The 2019 race took place at Ascot after the original Newbury fixture was cancelled because of an equine influenza outbreak)	Clan Des Obeaux	7	Harry Cobden	Paul Nicholls
2020	Native River	10	Jonjo O’Neill Jr	Colin Tizzard
2021	Secret Investor	9	Bryony Frost	Paul Nicholls
2022	Eldorado Allen	8	Brendan Powell	Colin Tizzard
2023	Zanza	9	Tom O'Brien	Philip Hobbs
2024	Shishkin	10	Nico de Boinville	Nicky Henderson
2025	Djelo	7	Charlie Deutsch	Venetia Williams
2026	Haiti Couleurs	9	Sean Bowen	Rebecca Curtis

== See also ==
- Horse racing in Great Britain
- List of British National Hunt races
