= Coneygree =

British-bred Thoroughbred racehorse

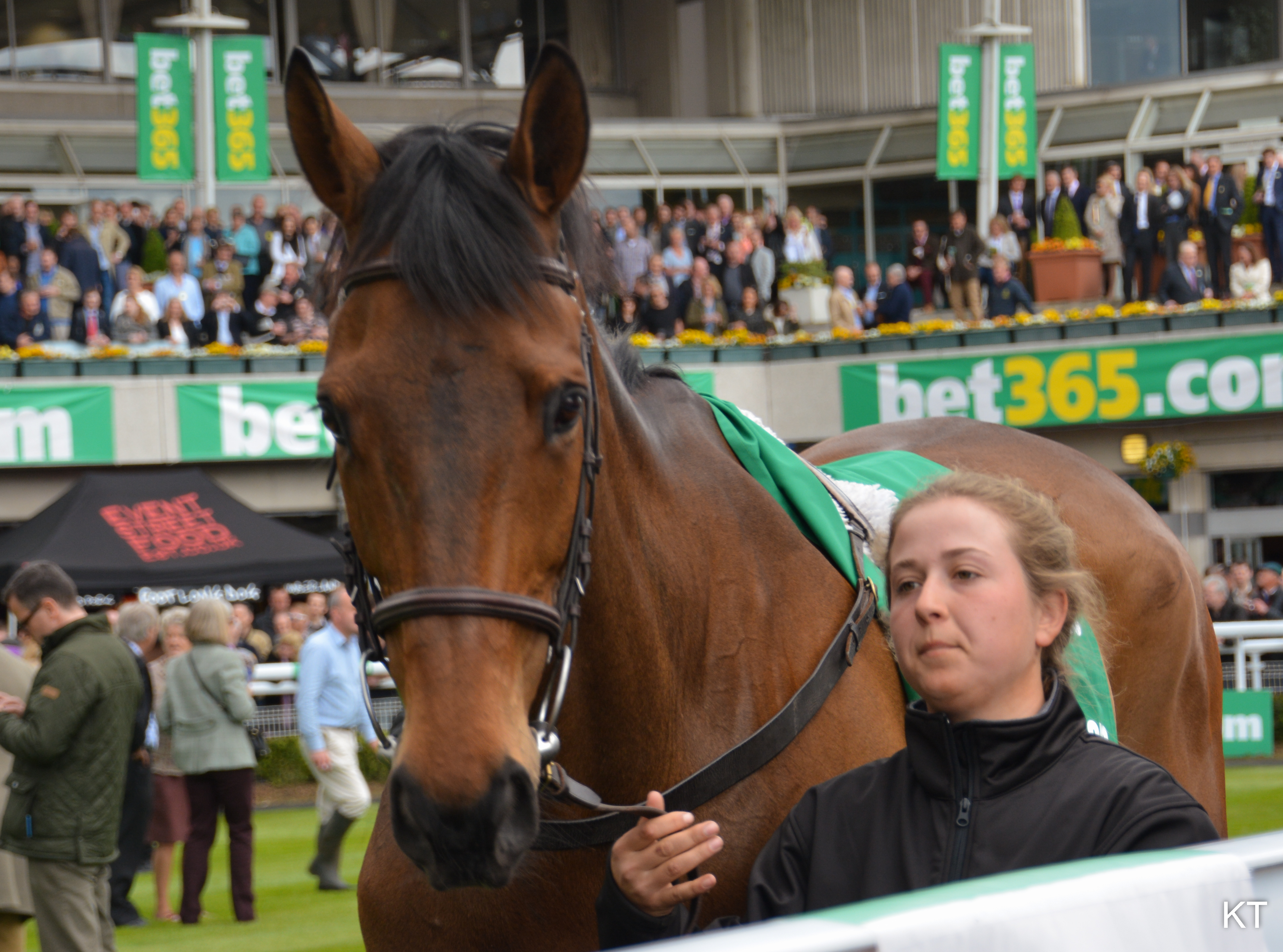
- Coneygree, April 2015
- Sire: Karinga Bay
- Grandsire: Ardross
- Dam: Plaid Maid
- Damsire: Executive Perk
- Sex: Gelding
- Foaled: 23 February 2007
- Country: United Kingdom
- Colour: Bay
- Breeder: John Oaksey
- Owner: The Max Partnership
- Trainer: Mark Bradstock
- Record: 18: 9-1-3; 12:5-1-2 (Chases); 4:3-0-1 (Hurdles); 2:1-0-0 (Bumpers)
- Earnings: £526,589

Major wins
- Hyde Novices' Hurdle (2012); Bristol Novices' Hurdle (2012); Berkshire Novices' Chase (2014); Kauto Star Novices' Chase (2014); Denman Chase (2015); Cheltenham Gold Cup (2015)
- Last updated on 26 April 2017

Coneygree (foaled 23 February 2007) is a retired British Thoroughbred racehorse who competed in National Hunt races. In a career which ran from November 2010 to February 2019 he ran in eighteen races, winning nine times. In March 2015, he became the first novice chaser to win the Cheltenham Gold Cup for more than forty years. His subsequent career was hampered by injury and he did not run again in the Cheltenham Gold Cup after winning it.

== Background ==
Coneygree is a bay horse bred in the United Kingdom by John Oaksey, a leading amateur jockey who later became a successful broadcaster and charity fundraiser before his death in 2012. Coneygree was from the final crop of foals sired by Karinga Bay, a son of Ardross, who won the Gordon Stakes and finished fifth in the 1990 Epsom Derby. Coneygree's dam Plaid Maid won five races and later became a successful broodmare, producing Hennessy Gold Cup winner Carruthers. Sara Bradstock described Plaid Maid as a "tiny little mare that we bought for nothing, who people thought was a joke".

Throughout his racing career, Coneygree has been trained at Letcombe Bassett in Oxfordshire by Mark Bradstock, the husband of John Oaksey's daughter Sara. He was ridden in all of his early races by Mattie Batchelor.

== Racing career ==
=== 2011/2012 National Hunt season: National Hunt Flat races ===
Coneygree made his racecourse debut on 24 November 2011 when he won a National Hunt Flat race at Uttoxeter Racecourse, taking the lead three furlongs from the finish and beating Dannanceys Hill by three and three quarter lengths at odds of 10/1. On his only other appearance, he finished eighth behind Shutthefrontdoor at Newbury Racecourse in February after weakening in the last quarter mile.

=== 2012/2013 National Hunt season: Novice hurdles ===
In the 2012/2013 National Hunt season, Coneygree competed in novice hurdle races. On his first appearance over obstacles at Uttoxeter in November, he led from the start and won by twenty lengths from Corrin Wood. Later that month, he was moved up in class to contest the Grade 2 Hyde Novices' Hurdle over two miles and five furlongs at Cheltenham Racecourse and made all the running to win by seven lengths and five lengths from Bondage and According to Trev. In December, Coneygree started 11/10 favourite for the Grade 2 Bristol Novices Hurdle over three miles at Cheltenham. He again led from the start, was never seriously challenged, and won by six lengths from the Paul Nicholls-trained Aerial, with Grand National winner Mon Mome in sixth. In January 2013, Coneygree started at odds of 9/4 for the Classic Novices' Hurdle over two and a half miles at Cheltenham and finished third behind At Fishers Cross and The New One. At the Cheltenham Festival in March At Fishers Cross and The New One won the Spa Novices' Hurdle and the Baring Bingham Novices' Hurdle, respectively.

=== 2014/2015 National Hunt season: Novice Chase ===
In 2013, Coneygree sustained a pelvic injury and missed the whole of the next season. When Bradstock entered him in a race at Plumpton Racecourse in early November, the horse was refused permission to race after being declared lame by the racecourse vet, who reportedly said, "He's had two years off. He's not worth anything." Bradstock responded by saying, "It's not any old horse that you are fucking about with!" Coneygree reappeared on 28 November 2014 when he contested the Grade 2 Berkshire Novices' Chase over two and a half miles at Newbury. Ridden for the first time by Nico de Boinville, he led from the start and won by one and a half lengths from Dell' Arca, with the pair finishing forty-five lengths clear of Horatio Hornblower. His task may have been made easier when the favoured Saphir de Rheu unseated his rider at the seventh fence. In December, the gelding started second favourite behind Saphir de Rheu in the Grade 1 Kauto Star Novices' Chase at Kempton Park Racecourse, with his other opponents including the Worcester Novices' Chase winner Carraig Mor and the December Novices' Chase winner Virak. Among the leaders from the start, Coneygree was left with a commanding advantage in the second half of the race as Saphir de Rheu fell at the seventh and Carraig Mor unseated his rider a fence late, and won by forty lengths from Warden Hill.

On 7 February, Coneygree was matched against more experienced chasers for the first time in the Denman Chase over three miles at Newbury. Ridden by Richard Johnson, he carried 159 pound and started the 15/8 favourite ahead of Houblon des Obeaux (United House Gold Cup), Taquin du Seuil (JLT Novices' Chase), Unioniste (2012 December Gold Cup), Double Ross (2013 December Gold Cup) and Harry Topper (Charlie Hall Chase). Coneygree took the lead from the start and looked to be in control of the race from the second last, winning by seven length from Houblon des Obeaux with a further three and a half length back to Unioniste in third. The official BHA handicapper Phil Smith rated his performance the best by a novice in Britain for fifteen years. In the build-up to the 2015 Cheltenham Festival, Coneygree's connections wavered between running the gelding against his fellow novices in the RSA Chase and taking on more experienced opposition in the Cheltenham Gold Cup. They chose the latter, and on 13 March 2015, Coneygree, on his fourth start over fences, attempted to become the first novice chaser since the Irish champion Captain Christy in 1974 to win the Gold Cup. The dual King George VI Chase winner Silviniaco Conti started the 3/1 favourite in a sixteen-runner field with Coneygree starting the 7/1 second choice alongside the Hennessy Gold Cup winner Many Clouds. The Lexus Chase winner Road To Riches and the Mildmay Novices' Chase winner Holywell started on 8/1 whilst the Willie Mullins trained six-year-old Djakadam was next in the betting at 10/1. The other contenders included Bobs Worth and Lord Windermere (winners of the race in 2013 and 2014 respectively), the Irish Gold Cup winner Carlingford Lough as well as On His Own and The Giant Bolster, who had finished second and third to Lord Windermere in the previous year's race. De Boinville sent the novice into the lead from the start, with On His Own being his closest pursuer for most of the race. When On His Own began to fade at the third last, Djakadam and Road To Riches emerged as Coneygree's only serious challengers. Coneygree jumped the last in front and tracked to the right as Djakadam and Road To Riches continued to battle for second place on the inside. Coneygree crossed the line a length and a half ahead of Djakadam, with Road To Riches two lengths back in third and Holywell six lengths away in fourth.

=== 2015/2016 National Hunt season: Steeplechases ===
Coneygree made a winning reappearance in the listed event Future Stars Chase Intermediate on 8 November, the main race of Sandown Park first Jump meeting of the season. The race was designed for last season's novices who had not won a Chase race prior to 27 April of last year, Nico de Boinville – Coneygree's regular rider – explaining: "There's a loophole there and we're making full use of it. There's no point giving him a harder prep-race than he needs." Only 3 runners started in the race with Southfield Theatre having his first run since finishing second in the 2015 Grade 1 RSA Chase. Coneygree took the lead and without being challenged finished 25 lengths ahead of his nearest rival. Trainer Mark Bradstock was pleased with the run and confirmed the next target for the Hennessy under top-weight. Injury would prevent Coneygree from appearing again that season.

=== 2016/2017 National Hunt season: Steeplechases ===
Coneygree finished 2nd to Cue Card by 15 lengths in the Betfair Chase on 19 November. After a five-month lay off due to an injury, which resulted in him missing the Cheltenham festival, Coneygree made his second and final appearance of the season at Punchestown. It was a six-runner field for the Coral Punchestown Gold Cup and he was up against Sizing John and Djakadam. Coneygree led from the start and eventually finished a close third.

=== 2017/2018 National Hunt season: Steeplechases ===
On his first start of the season, Coneygree was sent off the 7/4 favourite for the Charlie Hall Chase at Wetherby on 4 November. After making a couple of bad jumping errors, he was eventually pulled up and the race was won by Bristol De Mai. He was soon back on a racecourse as he contested the Ladbrokes Trophy Chase (formerly known as The Hennessy Chase) on 2 December in which he was sent off at 8/1. Coneygree led for the first circuit but soon faded after that and was again pulled up. The race was won by the favourite Total Recall trained by the Willie Mullins. The next intended race for Coneygree was the Cotswold Chase at Cheltenham in January but he was withdrawn from the race due to the very heavy ground. The Denman Chase at Newbury in February was his next scheduled appearance but again he was withdrawn, this time due to injury. His connections announced that he would not run again that season.

=== 2018/2019 National Hunt season: Steeplechases ===
After an absence of nearly twelve months, Coneygree made his latest comeback at Cheltenham and was sent off at 12/1 for the Bet.Victor.com Handicap Chase over 3 miles and 3 furlongs in November. Sean Bowen got the mount and was riding him for the first time. Rock the Kasbah won the race and Coneygree was 6 lengths back in third. His next outing was in the King George VI Chase on Boxing day. It was Coneygree's first appearance at Kempton in four years and his first attempt in this race. In what was a very good line-up of runners, Coneygree was sent off as one of the outsiders at 20/1. As to be expected. he led the field all the way until the 14th when he very quickly began to weaken and was a very tired horse when he unshipped Sean Bowen two fences from home. Clan Des Obeaux was the victor trained by Paul Nicholls returning at 12/1. Up next for Coneygree was a first ever visit to Ascot in February for the Keltbray Swinley Chase over just short of three miles. Nico De Boinville his regular jockey was back on board and Coneygree quickly went to the front and led all the way until the 15th. As in his previous race, he weakened very quickly and De Boinville pulled him up four fences from home. This proved to be his very final race as his owners promptly retired him immediately after the horse returned unscathed.

== Pedigree ==
Pedigree of Coneygree (GB), bay gelding, 2007
Sire Karinga Bay (GB) 1987	Ardross (IRE); 1976	Run The Gantlet	Tom Rolfe
Sire Karinga Bay (GB) 1987	Ardross (IRE); 1976	Run The Gantlet	First Feather
Sire Karinga Bay (GB) 1987	Ardross (IRE); 1976	Le Melody	Levmoss
Sire Karinga Bay (GB) 1987	Ardross (IRE); 1976	Le Melody	Arctic Melody
Sire Karinga Bay (GB) 1987	Handy Dancer (IRE); 1977	Green God	Red God
Sire Karinga Bay (GB) 1987	Handy Dancer (IRE); 1977	Green God	Thetis
Sire Karinga Bay (GB) 1987	Handy Dancer (IRE); 1977	Miss Golightly	Jimmy Reppin
Sire Karinga Bay (GB) 1987	Handy Dancer (IRE); 1977	Miss Golightly	Gracious Gal
Dam Plaid Maid (IRE) 1992	Executive Perk (IRE); 1985	Lord Gayle	Sir Gaylord
Dam Plaid Maid (IRE) 1992	Executive Perk (IRE); 1985	Lord Gayle	Sticky Case
Dam Plaid Maid (IRE) 1992	Executive Perk (IRE); 1985	Areola	Kythnos
Dam Plaid Maid (IRE) 1992	Executive Perk (IRE); 1985	Areola	Alive Alivo
Dam Plaid Maid (IRE) 1992	Tipperary Tartan (IRE); 1980	Rarity	Hethersett
Dam Plaid Maid (IRE) 1992	Tipperary Tartan (IRE); 1980	Rarity	Who Can Tell
Dam Plaid Maid (IRE) 1992	Tipperary Tartan (IRE); 1980	Colourful	Busted
Dam Plaid Maid (IRE) 1992	Tipperary Tartan (IRE); 1980	Colourful	Topaz (Family: 1-w)
