= Native River =

Irish-bred Thoroughbred racehorse

- Racing silks of Brocade Racing
- Sire: Indian River
- Grandsire: Cadoudal
- Dam: Native Mo
- Damsire: Be My Native
- Sex: Gelding
- Foaled: 4 May 2010
- Country: Ireland
- Colour: Chestnut
- Breeder: Fred Mackey
- Owner: Brocade Racing
- Trainer: Colin Tizzard
- Record: 28: 14-3-7
- Earnings: £1,043,567

Major wins
- Worcester Novices' Chase (2015); Mildmay Novices' Chase (2016); Hennessy Gold Cup (2016); Welsh Grand National (2016); Denman Chase (2017, 2018, 2020); Cheltenham Gold Cup (2018); Many Clouds Chase (2019); Cotswold Chase (2021)

Native River (foaled 4 May 2010) is an Irish-bred, British-trained, retired Thoroughbred racehorse who raced under National Hunt rules. He was a specialist long-distance steeplechaser known for his front-running style and inexhaustible stamina. He won three minor hurdle races in the 2014/15 season and started his chasing career in the 2015/16 season, winning the Worcester Novices' Chase and the Mildmay Novices' Chase. He emerged as a top-class steeplechaser in the following season when he won the Hennessy Gold Cup, Welsh Grand National and Denman Chase as well as finishing third in the Cheltenham Gold Cup. In the 2017/18 season he won a second Denman Chase before recording his biggest win in the 2018 Cheltenham Gold Cup. In the 2019/20 season he won the Many Clouds Chase and achieved a record third win in the Denman Chase. His last win came in the Cotswold Chase in February 2021 and he was retired after a disappointing run in the 2021 Welsh Grand National. He is the most recent British-trained Cheltenham Gold Cup winner.

== Background ==
Native River is a chestnut gelding, with a white blaze and four white socks bred in Ireland by Fred Mackey. As a foal he was consigned to the Tattersalls Ireland National Hunt sale in November 2010 and was bought for €6,000 by John Dineen.

He was sired by Indian River, a top-class jumper in his native France, where his wins included the Prix du Président de la République. As a breeding stallion, the most notable of his other offspring has been the Hennessy Gold Cup winner Madison du Berlais. Native River's dam, Native Mo, was an unraced daughter of Be My Native. As a descendant of the Irish broodmare Rose Cygnet (foaled 1927) she was distantly related to Milady Rose (Irish 1,000 Guineas), Dragonara Palace (Richmond Stakes) and Brondesbury (Norfolk Stakes).

== Racing career ==
=== 2014/15 season ===
Native River began his racing career on the amateur point-to-point circuit, unseating his rider at the Dromahane meeting on 17 March 2014. He was then sent to England and entered professional training with Colin Tizzard at Milborne Port, in Dorset. He finished third in a National Hunt Flat race at Newton Abbot Racecourse on 10 October and then recorded his first success in a Novices' Hurdle race at Stratford Racecourse three weeks later. A month later, he started at odds of 10/1 for a more valuable novice event at Newcastle Racecourse and won by 2 3/4 lengths from the favourite Definitly Red. When stepped up in class, Native River finished last of the six runners in the Challow Novices' Hurdle and then fell at the penultimate flight in the Classic Novices' Hurdle. In a Novices' hurdle at Exeter Racecourse in February, he started at odds of 9/2 and won by 4 1/2 lengths from the Paul Nicholls-trained Emerging Talent. In March he made his first appearance at the Cheltenham Festival where he started a 40/1 outsider for the Spa Novices' Hurdle and came home ninth of the ten finishers.

=== 2015/16 season ===
In the 2015/16 season Native River was campaigned in Novices' steeplechases, starting with a third place at Chepstow Racecourse in October. A sixteen-length win at Exeter followed before the gelding was stepped up in class for the Worcester Novices' Chase over three miles at Newbury Racecourse on 26 November. Ridden as in most of his races up to then by Brendan Powell he took the lead approaching the final fence and drew away to win by almost four lengths from Un Temps Pour Tout. One of his owners, Garth Broom, said "He's only five and giving weight away against older, more experienced horses... he's got it all, he can stay and he can quicken". He was made favourite for the Feltham Novices' Chase at Kempton Park Racecourse but after jumping awkwardly he finished third to Tea For Two.

After finishing third to Blaklion and Definitly Red in the Towton Novices' Chase at Wetherby Racecourse in February, the gelding was sent for a second time to the Cheltenham Festival to contest the National Hunt Chase Challenge Cup and finished runner-up behind Minella Rocco. On his final appearance of the year Native River was sent to Aintree Racecourse in April for the Mildmay Novices' Chase in which he started the 11/2 third favourite behind Un Temps Pour Tout and Blaklion, both of whom had won at Cheltenham. Ridden by Richard Johnson, who was to become his regular jockey, he led for most of the way and stayed on strongly to win by three lengths from Henri Parry Morgan. After the race Tizzard said "One of his main attributes is staying. The horse runs a bit lazy but there's nothing wrong with that, they last a bit longer. Richard had to wake him up once or twice but he was straight back into his stride. He obviously loves that ground with his lovely, low action."

=== 2016/17 season ===
Native River began his fourth campaign by finishing second to Silsol in the West Yorkshire Hurdle at Wetherby Racecourse in October before returning to steeplechase fences. For the Hennessy Gold Cup at Newbury on 26 November he was assigned a weight of 155 pounds and started the 7/2 favourite in a nineteen-runner field. Racing in first or second place for most of the way he took a clear lead after the final fence and held off the late challenge of the outsider Carole's Destrier to win by half a length. Colin Tizzard commented "It looked like he would win by five lengths, but when Carole's Destrier nearly got to him, he went again. It is a sign of a good, honest stayer. We expected a big run, but he travelled better than ever before and jumped beautifully". A month later Native River carried top weight of 165 pounds in the Welsh Grand National over three and three quarter miles at Chepstow. Starting the 11/4 favourite he took the lead before halfway and won by one and three-quarter lengths from Raz de Maree with fifteen lengths back to Houblon des Obeaux in third.

In the Denman Chase at Newbury on 11 February in which Native River was opposed by Bristol de Mai (Finale Juvenile Hurdle, Scilly Isles Novices' Chase) and Le Mercurey (Future Champion Novices' Chase) he led from the start and won by three and a quarter lengths. On 17 March the gelding started the 7/2 second favourite behind Djakadam for the 2017 Cheltenham Gold Cup and disputed the lead for most of the way before finishing third, beaten two and three quarter lengths and a short head by Sizing John and Minella Rocco.

=== 2017/18 season ===
After an absence of almost eleven months, Native River returned to action in the Denman Chase on 10 February 2018. Starting the 8/11 favourite he repeated his 2017 success as he led from the start and won by twelve lengths from Cloudy Dream. The 2018 edition of the Cheltenham Gold Cup attracted a field of fifteen and saw Native River start 5/1 third favourite behind Might Bite (King George VI Chase) and Our Duke (Irish Grand National). The other runners included Definitly Red, Djakadam, Tea For Two, Killultagh Vic (Irish Daily Mirror Novice Hurdle), Road To Respect (Leopardstown Christmas Chase), Outlander (Lexus Chase) and Edwulf (Irish Gold Cup). Native River led from the start but was consistently pressed by Might Bite in second place. Might Bite took the lead two fences out but Native River rallied to regain the advantage at the last obstacle and pulled away on the run-in to win by four and a half lengths. After the race Richard Johnson said "I felt we’d gone quite steady but sometimes when you’re on a good horse it doesn’t feel that quick. I knew Native River's a stayer and he answered every call... he's just a warrior and it's a pleasure to ride him... very few horses are as straightforward and brave as he is."

=== 2018/19 season ===
Native River's first race of the season was the Betfair Chase at Haydock on 24 November. He finished second, four lengths behind Bristol de Mai. A month later he finished third behind Clan des Obeaux in the King George VI Chase at Kempton. Attempting to win a second Gold Cup at Cheltenham in March 2029, he finished fourth behind Al Boum Photo. It was Native River's first season without a win.

=== 2019/20 season ===
Native River returned to his winning form on his first outing of the season with a victory in the Many Clouds Chase at Aintree on 7 December. Ridden by Richard Johnson and starting odds-on favourite in a field of four, he won by 33 lengths after his main rival Might Bite unseated his rider early in the race. After a break of two months, he secured his third victory in the Denman Chase. Ridden by Jonjo O'Neill junior, he again started as odds-on favourite and won by two and three-quarter lengths from Secret Investor with Might Bite in third place. He missed the 2020 Cheltenham Gold Cup after suffering a tendon injury.

=== 2020/21 season ===
Returning from injury to attempt a second consecutive win in the Many Clouds Chase, Native River was beaten into third place behind outsider Lake View Lad and favourite Santini. His next race was the Cotswold Chase, usually held at Cheltenham but rescheduled due to weather and run at Sandown. In first appearance at Sandown, Native River beat Bristol de Mai by 9 and a half lengths with Santini in third place. After the race jockey Richard Johnson said: "A real hard slog around here was right up his street and it was great to see him do it again. He hasn't lost any of his enthusiasm, that's for sure." Native River ran twice more during the season, coming fourth behind Minella Indo in the Cheltenham Gold Cup and third behind Clan des Obeaux in the Betway Bowl at Aintree.

=== 2021/22 season and retirement ===
Native River began the season with a second place in the Many Clouds Chase, 25 lengths behind Protektorat. His next race was the Welsh Grand National at Chepstow, in which Brendan Powell pulled him up after the 16th fence. It was the first time he had failed to complete since unseating his rider in his first race, a point-to-point in March 2014. Later that evening, assistant trainer Joe Tizzard announced that the decision had been made to retire Native River, saying: "He's been an absolute legend for us all. His wins in the Cheltenham Gold Cup, the Hennessy and the Coral Welsh Grand National were all massive, memorable days for Garth and Anne [Broom, the owners] and the whole team. He's a lovely character, and has been a special horse to train. He will now enjoy a happy and well deserved retirement." Owner Garth Broom said: "We don't want to see him struggling so we thought this was the best thing to do.... He'll go back to Tom Malone, who bought him for us. He only lives down the road from us."

Following his retirement from racing, Native River settled into a new career in showing, qualifying for the 2024 Horse of the Year Show. Rider Emma Vine said: "He's been really trainable and is such a fabulous horse anyway. He has great paces and is easy to work with as he's naturally got a great walk, trot and powerful canter." He has also competed in Retraining of Racehorses dressage and showjumping competitions.

== Cheltenham Gold Cup record ==
•2017 - third, 7yo, 7-2. (Official rating 168)

•2018 - first, 8yo, 5-1. (Official rating 166)

•2019 - fourth, 9yo, 6-1. (Official rating 173)

•2021 - fourth, 11yo, 12-1. (Official rating 172)

== Pedigree ==
Pedigree of Native River (IRE), chestnut gelding 2010
| Sire Indian River (FR) 1994 | Cadoudal; 1979 | Green Dancer (USA) | Nijinsky (CAN) |
| Sire Indian River (FR) 1994 | Cadoudal; 1979 | Green Dancer (USA) | Green Valley (FR) |
| Sire Indian River (FR) 1994 | Cadoudal; 1979 | Come To Sea (IRE) | Sea Hawk (FR) |
| Sire Indian River (FR) 1994 | Cadoudal; 1979 | Come To Sea (IRE) | Camarilla (FR) |
| Sire Indian River (FR) 1994 | The Fun; 1979 | Funny Hobby (IRE) | Meadow Mint (USA) |
| Sire Indian River (FR) 1994 | The Fun; 1979 | Funny Hobby (IRE) | Zakyna (GB) |
| Sire Indian River (FR) 1994 | The Fun; 1979 | The Lark | Lanark (GB) |
| Sire Indian River (FR) 1994 | The Fun; 1979 | The Lark | Norman Lass |
| Dam Native Mo (IRE) 1996 | Be My Native (USA); 1979 | Our Native | Exclusive Native |
| Dam Native Mo (IRE) 1996 | Be My Native (USA); 1979 | Our Native | Our Jackie |
| Dam Native Mo (IRE) 1996 | Be My Native (USA); 1979 | Witchy Woman | Strate Stuff |
| Dam Native Mo (IRE) 1996 | Be My Native (USA); 1979 | Witchy Woman | Witchy Norma |
| Dam Native Mo (IRE) 1996 | Milford Run; 1985 | Deep Run | Pampered King (GB) |
| Dam Native Mo (IRE) 1996 | Milford Run; 1985 | Deep Run | Trial By Fire (GB) |
| Dam Native Mo (IRE) 1996 | Milford Run; 1985 | Belle of the West | Royal Buck (GB) |
| Dam Native Mo (IRE) 1996 | Milford Run; 1985 | Belle of the West | Shelly River (GB) (Family: 31) |
