= Djakadam =

French-bred Thoroughbred racehorse

- Racing silks of Richard Corveller and Susannah Ricci
- Sire: Saint des Saints
- Grandsire: Cadoudal
- Dam: Rainbow Crest
- Damsire: Baryshnikov
- Sex: Gelding
- Foaled: 12 May 2009
- Country: France
- Colour: Bay
- Breeder: Richard Corveller
- Owner: Richard Corveller; Susannah Ricci
- Trainer: Arnaud Chaille-Chaille; Willie Mullins
- Record: 28: 7-9-3
- Earnings: £664,341

Major wins
- Killiney Novice Chase (2013); Thyestes Chase (2015); John Durkan Memorial Punchestown Chase (2015, 2016)

Djakadam (foaled 12 May 2009) is a French-bred, Irish-trained Thoroughbred racehorse who competes in National Hunt races.

== Background ==
Djakadam is a bay gelding bred in France by Richard Corveller. He was sired by Saint des Saints, a top class French hurdler who went on to become a very successful sire of jumpers: his other winners have included Storm of Saintly (Grand Steeple-Chase de Paris) and Quito de la Roque (JNwine.com Champion Chase). Djakadam's mother Rainbow Crest was a moderate racehorse but a descendant of the British broodmare Dodoma, who was the ancestor of many major winners including Shergar. Djakadam was originally sent into training in France with Arnaud Chaille-Chaille.

== Racing career ==
=== 2012/13 National Hunt season: novice hurdles ===
Djakadam began his racing career in a hurdle race for three-year-olds at Compiegne on 24 April 2012 when he finished second to Valban. He was then acquired by Rich and Susanah Ricci and was sent to Ireland where he was trained by Willie Mullins. On his debut for his new connections he started the 30/100 favourite for a hurdle at Thurles Racecourse in January 2013. He took the lead and looked the likely winner before making a mistake at the final hurdle and unseating his rider Ruby Walsh. Paul Townend took the ride when the gelding recorded his first win in a similar event at Gowran Park four weeks later, beating Ibsen by fourteen lengths at odds of 4/7. Djakadam followed up at Limerick Racecourse on 17 March, leading from the start and winning by seven lengths from Courage. The gelding was then moved up in class and started favourite for the Grade 3 GSB Hurdle at Fairyhouse on 2 April but was beaten three and a quarter lengths into second place by the Jessica Harrington-trained One Fine Day. On his final start of the season he was stepped up again in class for the Grade 1 Champion Four Year Old Hurdle at Punchestown on 29 April and finished fourth behind Diakali, Blood Cotil and Dogora.

=== 2013/14 National Hunt season: novice chases ===
In the 2013/14 National Hunt season Djakadam was campaigned in novice steeplechasing. He made a successful debut over the larger obstacles in a minor at Leopardstown Racecourse on 28 December and was then moved up in class for the Grade 2 Killiney Novice Chase over two miles five furlongs at the same track on 25 January. Ridden by Townend he started the 6/4 favourite against Bright New Dream (winner of the Michael Purcell Memorial Novice Hurdle), Mullaghanoe River and Road to Riches (Cork Stayers Novice Hurdle). He disputed the lead with Bright New Dream before taking a decisive advantage at the last fence and drew away up the run-in to win by four lengths. In March he was sent to the Cheltenham Festival for the first time and started a 14/1 outsider for the JLT Novices' Chase. He appeared to be going well in second place before falling at the fourth last fence.

=== 2014/15 National Hunt season: steeplechases ===
On his first appearance of the 2014/15 National Hunt season, Djakadam was sent to England and was matched against more experienced opponents in the Hennessy Gold Cup over three and a quarter miles at Newbury Racecourse on 29 November. Carrying 151 pounds he started the 5/1 favourite but tired over the last four fences and finished eighth behind Many Clouds. On 22 January 2015 Djakadam carried top weight of 164 pounds in the Thyestes Chase over three miles and a furlong on heavy ground at Gowran Park. In a race run in thick fog, he took the lead at the second last and was left with a clear advantage when his closest pursuer, The Job Is Right unseated his rider at the last. He stayed on well up the run-in to win by eight lengths from My Murphy.

On 13 March, Djakadam was one of sixteen horses ro contest the Cheltenham Gold Cup. Ridden by Walsh he was the 10/1 fifth choice in the betting behind Silviniaco Conti, Coneygree, Road To Riches and Holywell. After tracking the leaders he moved into third place at the penultimate fence and recovered from a mistake at the last to make a strong challenge on the run-in. He drifted to the right in the closing stages and finished one and a half lengths second to Coneygree with Road To Riches two lengths back in third. At Punchestown in April he started favourite for the Punchestown Gold Cup but was beaten seven lengths into second place by Don Cossack.

=== 2015/16 National Hunt season: steeplechases ===
Djakadam began his next season in the John Durkan Memorial Chase at Punchestown on 6 December. With Walsh again in the saddle he started the 7/4 favourite ahead of six opponents headed by Valseur Lido (Drinmore Novice Chase, Growise Champion Novice Chase) and Gilgamboa (Ryanair Novice Chase). He took the lead at the second fence and was never seriously challenged, winning by twelve lengths from Valseur Lido. In January he was sent to England and made odds-on favourite for the Cotswold Chase at Cheltenham, but fell at the tenth fence in a race won by Smad Place.

On 18 March Djakadam made his second attempt to win the Cheltenham Gold Cup and started the 9/2 third favourite behind Don Cossack and Cue Card. After being positioned just behind the leaders by Walsh he took a slight advantage at the sixteenth fence. When Cue Card fell at the third last the race devolved into a struggle between Djakadam and Don Cossack. Djakadam kept on well but was no match for his rival over the last two fences and was beaten four and a half lengths into second place.

=== 2016/17 National Hunt season: steeplechases ===
On 17 March Djakadam made his third attempt to win the Cheltenham Gold Cup and started the 3/1 favourite, with Native River the second favourite at 7/2. Djakadam tracked the leader Native River and was going well for most of the race. He led but made a mistake on the second last fence and lost some places and finished fourth. The race was won by Sizing John, with Minella Rocco second and Native River third.

In the Punchestown Gold Cup Djakadam and Sizing John tracked Coneygree. They both overtook him. Djakadam finished second by a short head to Sizing John.

=== 2017/18 National Hunt season: steeplechases ===
On 16 March Djakadam entered the Cheltenham Gold Cup for the fourth time. He was held in 5th when he made a mistake at the second last fence. He finished fifth in the Cheltenham Gold Cup more than 20 lengths behind the winner Native River.

In the Punchestown Gold Cup Djakadam joined Bellshill at the second last and battled with Bellshill to the line. Djakadam came second 3/4 of a length behind Bellshill. It was the fourth time that Djakadam came second in that race.

Djakadam was retired in June 2018 after sustaining a hock injury in the Grand Steeplechase de Paris.

== Pedigree ==
Pedigree of Djakadam (FR), bay gelding, 2009
Sire Saint des Saints (FR) 1998	Cadoudal (FR); 1979	Green Dancer	Nijinsky
Sire Saint des Saints (FR) 1998	Cadoudal (FR); 1979	Green Dancer	Green Valley
Sire Saint des Saints (FR) 1998	Cadoudal (FR); 1979	Come to Sea	Sea Hawk
Sire Saint des Saints (FR) 1998	Cadoudal (FR); 1979	Come to Sea	Camarilla
Sire Saint des Saints (FR) 1998	Chamisene (FR); 1980	Pharly	Lyphard
Sire Saint des Saints (FR) 1998	Chamisene (FR); 1980	Pharly	Comely
Sire Saint des Saints (FR) 1998	Chamisene (FR); 1980	Tuneria	Tanerko
Sire Saint des Saints (FR) 1998	Chamisene (FR); 1980	Tuneria	Torrefranca
Dam Rainbow Crest (FR) 1999	Baryshnikov (AUS); 1991	Kenmare	Kalamoun
Dam Rainbow Crest (FR) 1999	Baryshnikov (AUS); 1991	Kenmare	Belle of Ireland
Dam Rainbow Crest (FR) 1999	Baryshnikov (AUS); 1991	Lady Giselle	Nureyev
Dam Rainbow Crest (FR) 1999	Baryshnikov (AUS); 1991	Lady Giselle	Valderna
Dam Rainbow Crest (FR) 1999	Rainbow Rainbow (IRE); 1986	Vision	Nijinsky
Dam Rainbow Crest (FR) 1999	Rainbow Rainbow (IRE); 1986	Vision	Foreseer
Dam Rainbow Crest (FR) 1999	Rainbow Rainbow (IRE); 1986	Ivory North	Sir Ivor
Dam Rainbow Crest (FR) 1999	Rainbow Rainbow (IRE); 1986	Ivory North	Alma North (Family 9-c)

- Djakadam is inbred 4 × 4 to Nijinsky, meaning that this stallion appears twice in the fourth generation of his pedigree.
