= Cotswold Chase =

Steeplechase horse race in Britain

Cotswold Chase
2026
Spillane's Tower	L'Homme Presse	Grey Dawning

Previous years
2025
L'Homme Presse	Stage Star	Gentlemansgame
2024
Capodanno	The Real Whacker	Stay Away Fay
2023
Ahoy Senor	Sounds Russian	Noble Yeats
2022
Chantry House	Santini	Aye Right
2021
Native River	Bristol De Mai	Santini

2020-2011
2020
Santini	Bristol De Mai	Top Ville Ben
2019
Frodon	Elegant Escape	Terrefort
2018
Definitly Red	American	Bristol De Mai
2017
Many Clouds	Thistlecrack	Smad Place
2016
Smad Place	Many Clouds	Theatre Guide
2015
Many Clouds	Smad Place	Dynaste
2014
The Giant Bolster	Rocky Creek	Harry Topper
2013
Cape Tribulation	Imperial Commander	Hunt Ball
2012
Midnight Chase	Tidal Bay	Knockara Beau
2011
Neptune Collonges	Tidal Bay	Punchestowns

2010-2001
2010
Taranis	Carruthers	Joe Lively
2009
Joe Lively	Halcon Genelardais	Tidal Bay
2008
Knowhere	Our Vic	Neptune Collonges
2007
Exotic Dancer	Our Vic	Halcon Genelardais
2006
See You Sometime	Royal Auclair	Ballycassidy
2005
Grey Abbey	Therealbandit	Royal Auclair
2004
Jair Du Cochet	Rince Ri	Only two finished
2003
Behrajan	Foly Pleasant	Gingembre
2002
Rince Ri	Legal Right	Go Ballistic
2001
See More Business	Beau	Cyfor Malta

2000-1991
2000
Looks Like Trouble	Go Ballistic	Majadou
1999
Cyfor Malta	Go Ballistic	See More Business
1998
See More Business	Cyborgo	Rough Quest
1997
One Man	Barton Bank	Yorkshire Gale
1995
Master Oats	Dubacilla	Barton Bank
1994
Dubacilla	Young Hustler	Run For Free
1993
Sibton Abbey	Another Coral	Cool Ground
1991
Celtic Shot	Toby Tobias	Norton's Coin

1990-1988
1990
Toby Tobias	Maid Of Money	Bigsun
1989
Deep Moment	Baies	Ballyhane
1988
Twin Oaks	Finished alone

The Cotswold Chase is a Grade 2 National Hunt steeplechase in Great Britain which is open to horses aged five years or older. It is run on the New Course at Cheltenham over a distance of about 3 miles and 1½ furlongs (3 miles 1 furlong and 156 yards, or 5,172 metres), and during its running there are twenty-one fences to be jumped. The race is scheduled to take place each year in January.

The race was first run in 1980 as the Tote Double Chase, later the Timeform Hall of Fame Chase. The event serves as a trial for the Cheltenham Gold Cup, which takes place at the same venue in March. It is held during Festival Trials Day, which features several other trials for races at the Cheltenham Festival. The event is registered as the Cotswold Chase, but it has usually been known by a sponsored title. The wine merchant Bibendum supported the race from 2010 to 2014, and its 2014 title promoted Argento, an Argentinian wine brand. From 2015 to 2019 the race was sponsored by the BetBright bookmaking firm. and since 2020 it has been sponsored by Paddy Power.

== Winners ==
Year	Winner	Age	Jockey	Trainer
1980	Raffi Nelson	7	Steve Smith Eccles	Nicky Henderson
1981	Little Owl	7	Jim Wilson (Note: amateur jockey)	Peter Easterby
1982	Lesley Ann	8	Colin Brown	David Elsworth
1983	Combs Ditch	7	Colin Brown	David Elsworth
1984	Everett	9	Stuart Shilston	Fulke Walwyn
1985	West Tip	8	Richard Dunwoody	Michael Oliver
1986	Misty Spirit	7	Steve Smith Eccles	D Lee
1987	Abandoned due to frost
1988	Twin Oaks	8	Paul Croucher	David Murray Smith
1989	Deep Moment	7	Dermot Browne	Mercy Rimell
1990	Toby Tobias	8	Mark Pitman	Jenny Pitman
1991	Celtic Shot	9	Peter Scudamore	Charlie Brooks
1992	Abandoned due to frost
1993	Sibton Abbey	8	Steve Smith Eccles	Ferdy Murphy
1994	Dubacilla	8	Dean Gallagher	Henry Cole
1995	Master Oats	9	Norman Williamson	Kim Bailey
1996	Abandoned due to frost
1997	One Man	9	Richard Dunwoody	Gordon W. Richards
1998	See More Business	8	Timmy Murphy	Paul Nicholls
1999	Cyfor Malta	6	Tony McCoy	Martin Pipe
2000	Looks Like Trouble	8	Norman Williamson	Noel Chance
2001	See More Business	11	Mick Fitzgerald	Paul Nicholls
2002	Rince Ri	9	Ruby Walsh	Ted Walsh
2003	Behrajan	8	Richard Johnson	Henry Daly
2004	Jair du Cochet	7	Jacques Ricou	Guillaume Macaire
2005	Grey Abbey	11	Graham Lee	Howard Johnson
2006 (Note: The 2006 running took place at Wincanton)	See You Sometime	11	Andrew Thornton	Seamus Mullins
2007	Exotic Dancer	7	Tony McCoy	Jonjo O'Neill
2008	Knowhere	10	Paddy Brennan	Nigel Twiston-Davies
2009	Joe Lively	10	Joe Tizzard	Colin Tizzard
2010	Taranis	9	Nick Scholfield	Paul Nicholls
2011	Neptune Collonges	9	Tony McCoy	Paul Nicholls
2012	Midnight Chase	10	Dougie Costello	Neil Mulholland
2013	Cape Tribulation	9	Denis O'Regan	Malcolm Jefferson
2014	The Giant Bolster	9	Tom Scudamore	David Bridgwater
2015	Many Clouds	7	Leighton Aspell	Oliver Sherwood
2016	Smad Place	9	Richard Johnson	Alan King
2017	Many Clouds	9	Leighton Aspell	Oliver Sherwood
2018	Definitly Red	9	Danny Cook	Brian Ellison
2019	Frodon	7	Bryony Frost	Paul Nicholls
2020	Santini	8	Nico de Boinville	Nicky Henderson
2021 (Note: The 2021 running took place at Sandown Park after the original Cheltenham fixture was abandoned due to waterlogging)	Native River	11	Richard Johnson	Colin Tizzard
2022	Chantry House	8	Nico de Boinville	Nicky Henderson
2023	Ahoy Senor	8	Derek Fox	Lucinda Russell
2024	Capodanno	8	Paul Townend	Willie Mullins
2025	L'Homme Presse	10	Charlie Deutsch	Venetia Williams
2026	Spillane's Tower	8	Jack Kennedy	Jimmy Mangan

== See also ==
- Horse racing in Great Britain
- List of British National Hunt races
