= Manifesto Novices' Chase =

Steeplechase horse race in Britain

- Class: Grade 1
- Location: Aintree Racecourse; Merseyside, England
- Inaugurated: 2009
- Race type: Steeplechase
- Sponsor: SSS Super Alloys
- Website: Aintree

Race information
- Distance: 2m 3f 200y (4,005 metres)
- Surface: Turf
- Track: Left-handed
- Qualification: Five-years-old and up
- Weight: 11 st 4 lb Allowances; 7 lb for mares
- Purse: £120,000 (2022); 1st: £67,524

Manifesto Novices' Chase
2026
Koktail Divin	Blueking D'oroux	Mambonumberfive

Previous years
2025
Impaire Et Passe	Gidleigh Park	Jango Baie
2024
Il Etait Temps	Ginny's Destiny	Grey Dawning
2023
Banbridge	Saint Roi	Visionarian
2022
Millers Bank	War Lord	The Widdow Maker
2021
Protektorat	The Shunter	Hitman

2020-2011
2019
Kalashnikov	La Bague Au Roi	Mengli Khan
2018
Finian's Oscar	Rene's Girl	Calino D'Airy
2017
Flying Angel	Cloudy Dream	Top Notch
2016
Arzal	L'Ami Serge	Sizing John
2015
Clarcam	Vibrato Valtat	Val De Law
2014
Uxizandre	Oscar Whisky	Western Warhorse
2013
Captain Conan	Tap Night	Changing Times
2012
Menorah	Cristal Bonus	Al Ferof
2011
Wishfull Thinking	Medermit	Royal Charm

2010-2009
2010
Mad Max	Somersby	The Nightingale
2009
Tartak	Deep Purple	Planet of Sound

The Manifesto Novices' Chase is a Grade 1 National Hunt steeplechase in Great Britain which is open to horses aged five years or older. It is run at Aintree over a distance of about 2 miles and 4 furlongs (2 miles, 3 furlongs and 200 yards, or 4,005 metres), and during its running there are sixteen fences to be jumped. The race is for novice chasers, and it is scheduled to take place each year during the Grand National meeting in early April.

The event is named after Manifesto, a horse which ran eight times in the Grand National between 1895 and 1904. He won the race twice, finished third on three occasions and was fourth once.

The Manifesto Novices' Chase was established in 2009 as a Grade 2 race, and it features horses which ran previously in the Arkle Challenge Trophy and the JLT Novices' Chase. In 2012 the race was promoted to Grade 1 status.

== Records ==
Leading jockey (2 wins):

- Richard Johnson – Wishfull Thinking (2011), Menorah (2012)
- Barry Geraghty – Mad Max (2010), Captain Conan (2013)
- Paul Townend - Il Etait Temps (2024), Impaire Et Passe (2025)

Leading trainer (2 wins):

- Philip Hobbs – Wishfull Thinking (2011), Menorah (2012)
- Nicky Henderson – Mad Max (2010), Captain Conan (2013)
- Willie Mullins - Il Etait Temps (2024), Impaire Et Passe (2025)

== Winners ==
Year	Winner	Age	Jockey	Trainer
2009	Tartak	6	Paddy Brennan	Tom George
2010	Mad Max	8	Barry Geraghty	Nicky Henderson
2011	Wishfull Thinking	8	Richard Johnson	Philip Hobbs
2012	Menorah	7	Richard Johnson	Philip Hobbs
2013	Captain Conan	6	Barry Geraghty	Nicky Henderson
2014	Uxizandre	6	Tony McCoy	Alan King
2015	Clarcam	5	Ruby Walsh	Gordon Elliott
2016	Arzal	6	Gavin Sheehan	Harry Whittington
2017	Flying Angel	6	Noel Fehily	Nigel Twiston-Davies
2018	Finian's Oscar	6	Robbie Power	Colin Tizzard
2019	Kalashnikov	6	Jack Quinlan	Amy Murphy
	no race 2020 (Note: The 2020 running was cancelled because of the COVID-19 pandemic in the United Kingdom)
2021	Protektorat	6	Harry Skelton	Dan Skelton
2022	Millers Bank	8	Kielan Woods	Alex Hales
2023	Banbridge	7	JJ Slevin	Joseph O'Brien
2024	Il Etait Temps	6	Paul Townend	Willie Mullins
2025	Impaire Et Passe	7	Paul Townend	Willie Mullins
2026	Koktail Divin	6	Darragh O'Keeffe	Henry de Bromhead

== See also ==
- Horse racing in Great Britain
- List of British National Hunt races
