= Mildmay Novices' Chase =

Steeplechase horse race in Britain

Mildmay Novices' Chase
2026
Gold Dancer	Regent's Stroll	Salver

Previous years
2025
Caldwell Potter	Jordans	The Changing Man
2024
Inothewayurthinkin	Iroko	Heart Wood
2023
Gerri Colombe	Complete Unknown	Bronn
2022
Ahoy Senor	Fury Road	L'Homme Presse
2021
Chantry House	Shan Blue	Fiddlerontheroof

2020-2011
2019
Lostintranslation	Topofthegame	Top Ville Ben
2018
Terrefort	Ms Parfois	Elegant Escape
2017
Might Bite	Whisper	Virgilio
2016
Native River	Henri Parry Morgan	Blaklion
2015
Saphir Du Rheu	Carraig Mor	Irish Saint
2014
Holywell	Don Cossack	Wonderful Charm
2013
Dynaste	Third Intention	Rocky Creek
2012
Silviniaco Conti	Champion Court	Join Together
2011
Quito De La Roque	Sarando	Golan Way

2010-2001
2010
Burton Port	Dance Island	Take The Breeze
2009
Killyglen	Shining Gale	Siegemaster
2008
Big Buck's	Battlecry	Albertas Run
2007
Aces Four	Faasel	Dom d'Orgeval
2006
Star De Mohaison	Turpin Green	Copsale Lad
2005
Like-A-Butterfly	See You Sometime	L'ami
2004
Simply Supreme	L'aventure	Double Honour
2003
Irish Hussar	It Takes Time	Joly Bey
2002
Barton	Southern Star	Japhet
2001
What's Up Boys	Shotgun Willy	Hati Roy

2000-1991
2000
High Game	Bosuns Mate	Connor Macleod
1999
Spendid	Village King	Makounji
1998
Boss Doyle	Occold	Castle Coin
1997
Cyborgo	The Last Fling	Judicious Captain
1996
Addington Boy	Avro Anson	Golden Spinner
1995
Banjo	Kadi	Scotton Banks
1994
Monsieur Le Cure	Crystal Spirit	Meleagris
1993
Cab on Target	Forest Sun	Young Hustler
1992
Bradbury Star	Jodami	Run For Free
1991
Sparkling Flame	Esha Ness	Killbanon

1990-1988
1990
Royal Athlete	Arctic Call	Cahervillahow
1989
Swardean	Envopak Token	Brabiner Boy
1988
Delius	Loddon Lad	Rivernot

The Mildmay Novices' Chase is a Grade One National Hunt chase in Great Britain which is open to horses aged five years or older. It is run on the Mildmay course at Aintree over a distance of about 3 miles and 1 furlong (3 miles and 210 yards, or 5,020 metres), and during its running there are nineteen fences to be jumped. The race is for novice chasers, and it is scheduled to take place each year during the Grand National meeting in early April.

The event was established in 1981, and its first two winners – Bregawn and Burrough Hill Lad – both went on to win the Cheltenham Gold Cup. The race used to be regularly sponsored by Mumm, but it has had several different sponsors since 2001. The latest of these, Betway, began supporting the event in 2017. It was upgraded to Grade One status from its 2014 running.

The Mildmay Novices' Chase usually features horses which ran previously in the RSA Insurance Novices' Chase, and the last to win both races was Might Bite in 2017.

== Records ==
Leading jockey (4 wins):

- Richard Dunwoody – Against The Grain (1987), Sparkling Flame (1991), Banjo (1995), Cyborgo (1997)

Leading trainer (6 wins):

- Nicky Henderson - Sparkling Flame (1991), Irish Hussar (2003), Burton Port (2010), Might Bite (2017), Terrefort (2018), Chantry House (2021)

== Winners ==
Year	Winner	Age	Jockey	Trainer
1981	Bregawn	7	Robert Earnshaw	Michael Dickinson
1982	Burrough Hill Lad	6	Phil Tuck	Jenny Pitman
1983	Everett	8	Stuart Shilston	Fulke Walwyn
1984	Baron Blakeney	7	Oliver Sherwood (Note: amateur jockey)	Martin Pipe
1985	Rhyme 'n' Reason	6	Graham Bradley	David Murray Smith
1986	Stearsby	7	Graham Bradley	Jenny Pitman
1987	Against the Grain	6	Richard Dunwoody	David Nicholson
1988	Delius	10	Bruce Dowling	Richard Lee
1989	Swardean	7	Bruce Dowling	Richard Lee
1990	Royal Athlete	7	Mark Pitman	Jenny Pitman
1991	Sparkling Flame	7	Richard Dunwoody	Nicky Henderson
1992	Bradbury Star	7	Eamon Murphy	Josh Gifford
1993	Cab On Target	7	Peter Niven	Mary Reveley
1994	Monsieur Le Cure	8	Peter Niven	John Edwards
1995	Banjo	5	Richard Dunwoody	Martin Pipe
1996	Addington Boy	8	Brian Harding	Gordon W. Richards
1997	Cyborgo	7	Richard Dunwoody	Martin Pipe
1998	Boss Doyle	6	Tony McCoy	Mouse Morris
1999	Spendid	7	Richard Johnson	David Nicholson
2000	High Game	6	Norman Williamson	Simon Sherwood
2001	What's Up Boys	7	Richard Johnson	Philip Hobbs
2002	Barton	9	Tony Dobbin	Tim Easterby
2003	Irish Hussar	7	Mick Fitzgerald	Nicky Henderson
2004	Simply Supreme	7	Richard McGrath	Sue Smith
2005	Like-A-Butterfly	11	Tony McCoy	Christy Roche
2006	Star de Mohaison	5	Barry Geraghty	Paul Nicholls
2007	Aces Four	8	Graham Lee	Ferdy Murphy
2008	Big Buck's	5	Ruby Walsh	Paul Nicholls
2009	Killyglen	7	Denis O'Regan	Howard Johnson
2010	Burton Port	6	Barry Geraghty	Nicky Henderson
2011	Quito De La Roque	7	Davy Russell	Colm Murphy
2012	Silviniaco Conti	6	Ruby Walsh	Paul Nicholls
2013	Dynaste	7	Tom Scudamore	David Pipe
2014	Holywell	7	Tony McCoy	Jonjo O'Neill
2015	Saphir Du Rheu	6	Sam Twiston-Davies	Paul Nicholls
2016	Native River	6	Richard Johnson	Colin Tizzard
2017	Might Bite	8	Nico de Boinville	Nicky Henderson
2018	Terrefort	5	Daryl Jacob	Nicky Henderson
2019	Lostintranslation	7	Robbie Power	Colin Tizzard
	no race 2020 (Note: The 2020 running was cancelled because of the COVID-19 pandemic in the United Kingdom)
2021	Chantry House	7	Nico de Boinville	Nicky Henderson
2022	Ahoy Senor	7	Derek Fox	Lucinda Russell
2023	Gerri Colombe	7	Davy Russell	Gordon Elliott
2024	Inothewayurthinkin	6	Mark Walsh	Gavin Cromwell
2025	Caldwell Potter	7	Harry Cobden	Paul Nicholls
2026	Gold Dancer	7	Paul Townend	Willie Mullins

== See also ==
- Horse racing in Great Britain
- List of British National Hunt races
