= Might Bite =

British-bred Thoroughbred racehorse

- Racing Colours of Might Bite Owners
- Sire: Scorpion
- Dam: Knotted Midge
- Damsire: Presenting
- Sex: Gelding
- Foaled: 20 June 2009
- Country: Great Britain
- Colour: Bay
- Breeder: John O'Brien
- Owner: The Knot Again Partnership
- Trainer: Nicky Henderson
- Record: 25:10,2,2
- Earnings: £606,915

Major wins
- RSA Chase (2017); Mildmay Novices Chase (2017); King George VI Chase (2017); Betway Bowl (2018)

Might Bite (born 20 June 2009) is a retired Irish-bred, British trained thoroughbred racehorse. He won four Group 1 races before being retired in 2021.

== Career ==
Might Bite was bred in Ireland by John O'Brien. His first race was at Newbury in January 2015, finishing 3rd before winning at the same course in March. A further victory at Cheltenham in April followed.

He switched between Chase and Hurdle races during 2015 and into early 2016, before scoring a first chase win at Doncaster in December. A fall followed before a run of form consisting of six victories in seven races. This run of form in 2017 included multiple Grade 1 wins at Cheltenham in the RSA Chase, Aintree in the Mildmay Novices Chase and Kempton Park in the King George VI Chase.

Might Bite would return to the Cheltenham Festival in 2018 for a tilt at the Gold Cup, but ultimately finished second to Native River. A month later he won again at Aintree, this time in the Grade 1 Betway Bowl.

Following a summer break, Might Bite returned to Haydock in November 2018 but did not recapture his previous form and failed to win another race before retirement in 2021. His final race was at Aintree in the Grand Sefton Handicap Chase over the Grand National course, where he was pulled up.

Might Bite was trained by Nicky Henderson for his whole racing career and was primarily ridden by Nico de Boinville.
