= Newbury Gold Cup =

Steeplechase horse race in Britain

- Class: Premier Handicap
- Location: Newbury Racecourse; Newbury, England
- Inaugurated: 1957
- Race type: Steeplechase
- Sponsor: Coral
- Website: Newbury

Race information
- Distance: 3m 1f 214y (5,331 metres)
- Surface: Turf
- Track: Left-handed
- Qualification: Four-years-old and up
- Weight: Handicap
- Purse: £250,000 (2025); 1st: £142,375

Newbury Gold Cup Chase
2025
Panic Attack	Three Card Brag	The Changing Man

Previous years
2024
Kandoo Kid	Broadway Boy	Victtorino
2023
Datsalrightgino	Mahler Mission	Monbeg Genius
2022
Le Milos	Remastered	Gericault Roque
2021
Cloudy Glen	Fiddlerontheroof	Brahma Bull

2020-2011
2020
Cloth Cap	Aye Right	The Conditional
2019
De Rasher Counter	The Conditional	Elegant Escape
2018
Sizing Tennessee	Elegant Escape	Dingo Dollar
2017
Total Recall	Whisper	Regal Encore
2016
Native River	Carole's Destrier	Double Ross
2015
Smad Place	Theatre Guide	First Lieutenant
2014
Many Clouds	Houblon Des Obeaux	Merry King
2013
Triolo D'Alene	Rocky Creek	Theatre Guide
2012
Bobs Worth	Tidal Bay	First Lieutenant
2011
Carruthers	Planet of Sound	Fair Along

2010-2001
2010
Diamond Harry	Burton Port	Denman
2009
Denman	What A Friend	Niche Market
2008
Madison Du Berlais	Air Force One	Snoopy Loopy
2007
Denman	Dream Alliance	Character Building
2006
State of Play	Juveigneur	Preacher Boy
2005
Trabolgan	L'ami	Cornish Rebel
2004
Celestial Gold	Ollie Magern	Royal Auclair
2003
Strong Flow	Joss Naylor	Take Control
2002
Gingembre	Harbour Pilot	Whitenzo
2001
What's Up Boys	Behrajan	Take Control

2000-1991
2000
King's Road	Gingembre	Alexander Banquet
1999
Ever Blessed	Spendid	Fiddling The Facts
1998
Teeton Mill	Eudipe	Fiddling The Facts
1997
Suny Bay	Barton Bank	Eudipe
1996
Coome Hill	The Grey Monk	Lo Stregone
1995
Couldnt Be Better	Rough Quest	Superior Finish
1994
One Man	Lord Relic	Commercial Artist
1993
Cogent	Cahervillahow	Black Humour
1992
Sibton Abbey	Jodami	The Fellow
1991
Chatam	Master Bob	Man O'Magic

1990-1981
1990
Arctic Call	Master Bob	Cahervillahow
1989
Ghofar	Brown Windsor	Mr Frisk
1988
Strands of Gold	Handy Trick	Mr Frisk
1987
Playschool	Contradeal	Durham Edition
1986
Broadheath	Two Coppers	Maori Venture
1985
Galway Blaze	Run And Skip	Door Latch
1984
Burrough Hill Lad	Canny Danny	Gaye Chance
1983
Brown Chamberlin	Gaye Chance	Silent Valley
1982
Bregawn	Captain John	Sea Captain
1981
Diamond Edge	Political Pop	Straight Jocelyn

1980-1971
1980
Bright Highway	Silent Valley	Peter Scot
1979
Fighting Fit	Zongalero	Royal Stuart
1978
Approaching	Master H	William Penn
1977
Bachelor's Hall	Fort Devon	Aldaniti
1976
Zeta's Son	Tamalin	Banlieu
1975
April Seventh	Collingwood	Cuckolder
1974
Royal Marshall	Iceman	Moonlight Escapade
1973
Red Candle	Red Rum	Anthony Watt
1972
Charlie Potheen	Roman Holiday	Ballysagert
1971
Bighorn	Young Ash Leaf	Saggart's Choice

1970-1961
1970
Border Mask	Lord Jim	Freddie Boy
1969
Spanish Steps	Larbawn	Lord Jim
1968
Man of the West	Arcturus	Fearless Fred
1967
Rondetto	Stalbridge Colonist	What A Myth
1966
Stalbridge Colonist	Arkle	What A Myth
1965
Arkle	Freddie	Brasher
1964
Arkle	Ferry Boat	The Rip
1963
Mill House	Happy Spring	Arkle
1962
Springbok	Rough Tweed	Knucklecracker
1961
Mandarin	John O'Groats	Taxidermist

1960-1959
1960
Knucklecracker	Zonda	Fearless Cavalier
1959
Kerstin	Brunel	Croizet

The Newbury Gold Cup (currently known as the Coral Newbury Gold Cup for sponsorship reasons) is a Premier Handicap National Hunt steeplechase in Great Britain which is open to horses aged four years or older. It is run at Newbury over a distance of about 3 miles and 2 furlongs (3 miles, 1 furlong and 214 yards, or 5,225 metres), and during its running there are twenty-one fences to be jumped. It is a handicap race, and it is scheduled to take place each year in late November or early December.

== History ==
The event was established in 1957 as the Hennessy Cognac Gold Cup, and it was initially staged at Cheltenham. The winner of the inaugural running, Mandarin, was owned by Peggy Hennessy, a member of the family which founded Hennessy, the race's sponsoring company. It was transferred to Newbury in 1960, and it was won by Mandarin for a second time in 1961. The race's second running was won by Taxidermist, ridden by the amateur rider John Lawrence, later Lord Oaksey, who was the breeder and part-owner of the 2011 winner, Carruthers.

The race's association with Hennessy continued until the 60th running, in 2016, and was British racing's longest-running commercial sponsorship at the time. The record was previously held by the Whitbread Gold Cup, which was first run seven months before the "Hennessy", and which was sponsored by Whitbread until 2001. Ladbrokes were announced as the new sponsor in February 2017 and the race was run as the Ladbrokes Trophy until 2021. In 2022 Coral replaced Ladbrokes as the title sponsor. 'Newbury' was added to the name in 2026 to give the race a registered title.

The race has been won by nine horses that have also won the Cheltenham Gold Cup. The most recent of these is Native River, the winner of the latter race in 2018.

Many Clouds became the first horse to win both the Hennessy Gold Cup and the Grand National, in 2014 and 2015 respectively.

== Records ==
Most successful horse (2 wins):

- Mandarin – 1957, 1961
- Arkle – 1964, 1965
- Denman – 2007, 2009

Leading jockey (3 wins):

- Willie Robinson – Mandarin (1961), Mill House (1963), Man of the West (1968)
- Tom Scudamore - Madison du Berlais (2008), Sizing Tennessee (2018), Cloth Cap (2020)

Leading trainer (7 wins):

- Fulke Walwyn – Mandarin (1957, 1961), Taxidermist (1958), Mill House (1963), Man of the West (1968), Charlie Potheen (1972), Diamond Edge (1981)

== Winners ==
- Weights given in stones and pounds

Year	Winner	Age	Weight	Jockey	Trainer
1957	Mandarin	6	11–00	Gerry Madden	Fulke Walwyn
1958	Taxidermist	6	11–01	John Lawrence (Note: amateur rider)	Fulke Walwyn
1959	Kerstin	9	11–10	Stan Hayhurst	Verly Bewicke
1960	Knucklecracker	7	11–01	Derek Ancil	Derek Ancil
1961	Mandarin	10	11–05	Willie Robinson	Fulke Walwyn
1962	Springbok	8	10–08	Gerry Scott	Neville Crump
1963	Mill House	6	12–00	Willie Robinson	Fulke Walwyn
1964	Arkle	7	12–07	Pat Taaffe	Tom Dreaper
1965	Arkle	8	12–07	Pat Taaffe	Tom Dreaper
1966	Stalbridge Colonist	7	10–00	Stan Mellor	Ken Cundell
1967	Rondetto	11	10–01	Jeff King	Bob Turnell
1968	Man of the West	7	10–00	Willie Robinson	Fulke Walwyn
1969	Spanish Steps	6	11–08	John Cook	Edward Courage
1970	Border Mask	8	11–01	David Mould	Peter Cazalet
1971	Bighorn	7	10–11	David Cartwright	Charlie Vernon Miller
1972	Charlie Potheen	7	11–04	Richard Pitman	Fulke Walwyn
1973	Red Candle	9	10–04	Jimmy Fox	Ricky Vallance
1974	Royal Marshall II	7	10–00	Graham Thorner	Tim Forster
1975	April Seventh	9	11–02	Andrew Turnell	Bob Turnell
1976	Zeta's Son	7	10–09	Ian Watkinson	Peter Bailey
1977	Bachelor's Hall	7	10–10	Martin O'Halloran	Peter Cundell
1978	Approaching	7	10–06	Bob Champion	Josh Gifford
1979	Fighting Fit	7	11–07	Richard Linley	Ken Oliver
1980	Bright Highway	6	11–06	Gerry Newman	Michael O'Brien
1981	Diamond Edge	10	11–10	Bill Smith	Fulke Walwyn
1982	Bregawn	8	11–10	Graham Bradley	Michael Dickinson
1983	Brown Chamberlin	8	11–08	John Francome	Fred Winter
1984	Burrough Hill Lad	8	12–00	John Francome	Jenny Pitman
1985	Galway Blaze	9	10–00	Mark Dwyer	Jimmy FitzGerald
1986	Broadheath	9	10–05	Paul Nicholls	David Barons
1987	Playschool	9	10–08	Paul Nicholls	David Barons
1988	Strands of Gold	9	10–00	Peter Scudamore	Martin Pipe
1989	Ghofar	6	10–02	Hywel Davies	David Elsworth
1990	Arctic Call	7	11–00	Jamie Osborne	Oliver Sherwood
1991	Chatam	7	10–06	Peter Scudamore	Martin Pipe
1992	Sibton Abbey	7	10–00	Adrian Maguire	Ferdy Murphy
1993	Cogent	9	10–01	Dan Fortt	Andrew Turnell
1994	One Man	6	10–00	Tony Dobbin	Gordon W. Richards
1995	Couldn't Be Better	8	10–08	Dean Gallagher	Charlie Brooks
1996	Coome Hill	7	10–00	Jamie Osborne	Walter Dennis
1997	Suny Bay	8	11–08	Graham Bradley	Charlie Brooks
1998	Teeton Mill	9	10–05	Norman Williamson	Venetia Williams
1999	Ever Blessed	7	10–00	Timmy Murphy	Mark Pitman
2000	King's Road	7	10–07	Jamie Goldstein	Nigel Twiston-Davies
2001	What's Up Boys	7	10–12	Paul Flynn	Philip Hobbs
2002	Gingembre (Note: Be My Royal finished first in 2002, but he was subsequently disqualified after testing positive for a banned substance)	8	10–13	Andrew Thornton	Lavinia Taylor
2003	Strong Flow	6	11–00	Ruby Walsh	Paul Nicholls
2004	Celestial Gold	6	10–05	Timmy Murphy	Martin Pipe
2005	Trabolgan	7	11–12	Mick Fitzgerald	Nicky Henderson
2006	State of Play	6	11–04	Paul Moloney	Evan Williams
2007	Denman	7	11–12	Sam Thomas	Paul Nicholls
2008	Madison du Berlais	7	11–04	Tom Scudamore	David Pipe
2009	Denman	9	11–12	Ruby Walsh	Paul Nicholls
2010	Diamond Harry	7	10–00	Daryl Jacob	Nick Williams
2011	Carruthers	8	10–04	Mattie Batchelor	Mark Bradstock
2012	Bobs Worth	7	11–06	Barry Geraghty	Nicky Henderson
2013	Triolo D'Alene	6	11–01	Barry Geraghty	Nicky Henderson
2014	Many Clouds	7	11–06	Leighton Aspell	Oliver Sherwood
2015	Smad Place	8	11–04	Wayne Hutchinson	Alan King
2016	Native River	6	11–01	Richard Johnson	Colin Tizzard
2017	Total Recall	8	10–08	Paul Townend	Willie Mullins
2018	Sizing Tennessee	10	11–03	Tom Scudamore	Colin Tizzard
2019	De Rasher Counter	7	10-10	Ben Jones	Emma Lavelle
2020	Cloth Cap	8	10–00	Tom Scudamore	Jonjo O'Neill
2021	Cloudy Glen	8	10–08	Charlie Deutsch	Venetia Williams
2022	Le Milos	7	11–00	Harry Skelton	Dan Skelton
2023	Datsalrightgino	7	10–07	Gavin Sheehan	Jamie Snowden
2024	Kandoo Kid	8	11–05	Harry Cobden	Paul Nicholls
2025	Panic Attack	9	10–05	Tristan Durrell	Dan Skelton

== See also ==
- Horse racing in Great Britain
- List of British National Hunt races
