= Noel Fehily =

Irish jockey

Noel Fehily (born 24 December 1975) is a retired Irish professional horse racing jockey. Throughout his professional career, he has enjoyed substantial success including the King George VI Chase and Champion Hurdle, despite enduring significant injuries.

== Personal life ==
In 2007, Fehily married Natasha Chappell at a wedding ceremony in Gougane Barra, County Cork. He has two brothers Eamonn and Micheal who both have achievements in racing and Gaa. Their father was a Cork farmer. Natasha describes him as having a very calm personality, saying: "If he was any more relaxed he'd be asleep." They had their first child, a daughter, Niamh, on September 2, 2012.

== Early career ==
Fehily began his jockey career by working on the Irish point-to-point circuit. His next step was hunter chases, which became the field he ultimately specialised in. So he moved to the UK where he won at Plumpton, in 1998 riding Ivy Boy.

In 2001, Fehily became Conditional Jump Jockey Champion. After that, he became the number one jockey in Charlie Mann's yard.

== Career ==
In 2005, he became second jockey to Jonjo O’Neill, at the same time, riding for trainer Charlie Mann. In 2008, had his first Cheltenham Festival winner, which was on Silver Jaro. Later that year he won his first Grade 1, which was for Mann on Air Force One at Punchestown Racecourse in the Champion Novice Chase. In the 2008/09 season, he came fourth in the Jockeys’ table with 89 winners.

Fehily also had some rides for Paul Nicholls during the time Ruby Walsh was out with injuries or when Walsh was riding for Willie Mullins. Fehily won the Tingle Creek Chase on Master Minded in 2010. He rode Rock On Ruby in the 2012 Champion Hurdle and won after he missed the 2010 and 2011 Cheltenham Festivals through injury. In 2013 and 2014, he won the King George VI Chase on Silviniaco Conti.

In 2017, he again won the Champion Hurdle, this time on Buveur d'Air for trainer Nicky Henderson. The following day he also won the Queen Mother Champion Chase on Special Tiara. He rode Minella Rocco in the 2017 Cheltenham Gold Cup following an injury to Barry Gerraghty. Minella Rocco came second by 2 and 3/4 lengths. Noel retired from racing in 2019, with his final race being in Newbury on 23 March.

== Injuries ==
As of 2015, in his work, Fehily has sustained a shoulder injury and a horse falling on top of him at Cheltenham. He has endured injuries to both shoulders, a broken leg, as well as a wrist injury.

== Cheltenham Festival winners (6) ==
- Champion Hurdle -(2) Rock On Ruby (2012), Buveur d'Air (2017)
- Queen Mother Champion Chase -(1) Special Tiara (2017)
- Supreme Novices' Hurdle -(1) Summerville Boy (2018)
- Albert Bartlett Novices' Hurdle -(1) Unowhatimeanharry (2016)
- County Handicap Hurdle - (1) Silver Jaro (2008)

Tattersalls Mares Novices Hurdle (2019) Eglantine Du Seuil

== Major wins ==
(Republic of Ireland) Ireland

- Herald Champion Novice Hurdle -(1) Draconien (2018)
- Dooley Insurance Group Champion Novice Chase - (1) Air Force One (2008)
- Champion Stayers Hurdle -(1) Unowhatimeanharry (2017)
- Mares Novice Hurdle Championship Final -(1) Bitofapuzzle (2015)
- Dr P. J. Moriarty Novice Chase -(1) Monalee (2018)

(United Kingdom) Great Britain

- Henry VIII Novices' Chase -(2) Vibrato Valtat (2014), Altior (2016)
- Tingle Creek Chase -(1) Master Minded (2010)
- King George VI Chase -(2) Silviniaco Conti (2013,2014)
- Challow Novices' Hurdle -(1) Parlour Games (2015)
- Tolworth Hurdle -(1) Summerville Boy (2018)
- Clarence House Chase -(1) Dodging Bullets (2015)
- Scilly Isles Novices' Chase -(1) For Non Stop (2012)
- Ascot Chase -(1) Silviniaco Conti (2016)
- Manifesto Novices' Chase -(1) Flying Angel (2017)
- Betway Bowl -(2) Silviniaco Conti (2014, 2015)
- Top Novices' Hurdle -(1) Buveur d'Air (2016)
- Mersey Novices' Hurdle -(2) Bouggler (2009), Black Op (2018)
- Celebration Chase -(1) Special Tiara (2015)
