= Robbie Power =

Irish jockey

Robbie "Puppy" Power is a retired National Hunt jockey. The son of Irish show-jumper Con Power, Robbie Power rode the 33-1 outsider Silver Birch to victory in the 2007 John Smith's Grand National at Aintree Racecourse on Saturday 14 April 2007. It was his second Grand National ride after his Grand National debut in 2005. In 2011 he had his first Cheltenham Festival winner in the RSA Chase. In 2017 he won the Cheltenham Gold Cup and the Punchestown Gold Cup on Sizing John. He also won the Irish Grand National on Our Duke.

He announced his retirement from horse racing in 2022.

== TV ==
In 2013 he appeared on documentary The Irish Road To Cheltenham which was shown on RTÉ One television in Ireland.

== Cheltenham Festival winners (4) ==
- Cheltenham Gold Cup -(1) Sizing John (2017)
- RSA Insurance Novices' Chase -(1) Bostons Angel (2011)
- Coral Cup – (1) Supasundae (2017)
- Johnny Henderson Grand Annual Chase – (1) Rock The World (2017)

== Major wins ==
(Republic of Ireland) Ireland

- Alanna Homes Champion Novice Hurdle -(1) Reserve Tank (2019)
- Champion Four Year Old Hurdle -(1) Saldier (2018)
- Chanelle Pharma Novice Hurdle -(1) Oscars Well (2011)
- Dr P. J. Moriarty Novice Chase -(2) Carrigeen Victor (2005), Bostons Angel (2011)
- Greenmount Park Novice Chase -(1) Intelligent (2002)
- Irish Champion Hurdle -(1) Supasundae (2018)
- Irish Daily Mirror Novice Hurdle -(1) Sir Overbury (2006)
- Irish Gold Cup -(1) Sizing John (2017)
- John Durkan Memorial Punchestown Chase -(1) Sizing John (2017)
- Neville Hotels Novice Chase -(2) Bostons Angel (2010), Our Duke (2016)
- Paddy Power Dial-A-Bet Chase -(1) Big Zeb (2011)
- Paddy Power Future Champions Novice Hurdle -(1) Jezki (2012)
- Punchestown Champion Chase -(1) Fox Norton (2017)
- Punchestown Champion Hurdle -(1) Supasundae (2018)
- Punchestown Gold Cup -(1) Sizing John (2017)
- Ryanair Novice Chase -(1) Chacun Pour Soi (2019)

(United Kingdom) Great Britain

- Aintree Hurdle -(1) Supasundae (2019)
- Betfair Chase -(1) Lostintranslation (2019)
- Kauto Star Novices' Chase -(1) Slate House (2019)
- Manifesto Novices' Chase -(1) Finian's Oscar (2018)
- Melling Chase -(1) Fox Norton (2017)
- Mersey Novices' Hurdle -(2) Finian's Oscar (2017), Reserve Tank (2019)
- Mildmay Novices' Chase -(1) Lostintranslation (2019)
- Tolworth Novices' Hurdle -(1) Fiddlerontheroof (2020)
- Top Novices' Hurdle -(1) Pingshou (2017)

United States

- Grand National Hurdle Stakes -(1) Jury Duty (2018)
