= Lizzie Kelly =

British jockey

Lizzie Kelly (born 24 April 1993) is a retired British jockey who participated in National Hunt racing.

Kelly predominantly rode horses for her horse trainer stepfather, Nick Williams as well as her mother, Jane Williams, and also for trainer Neil King.

== Career ==
In early November 2015 she came second on Aubusson in the Grand Prix d'Automne at Auteuil. If she had won she would have been the first female jockey to win a Grade 1 race in France. On Boxing Day 2015 however she gained what was then her most notable success to date when Tea For Two won the Kauto Star Novices' Chase, making her the first female jockey to win a Grade One race in Britain, the horse being trained by Nick Williams and owned by her mother Jane Williams. In February 2016 she won Europe's richest handicap hurdle, the Betfair Hurdle, on Agrapart at Newbury, and the following year she became only the second woman to ride in the Cheltenham Gold Cup, again on Tea For Two, but she was unseated from her horse at the second fence. A few weeks later she won the Grade 1 Betfred Bowl on Tea For Two. The following year, she won the Ultima Handicap Chase at the Cheltenham Festival, riding Coo Star Sivola, trained by Nick Williams. She rode in the Cheltenham Gold Cup on Tea For Two for the second year in a row, where she finished seventh.

In July 2020, Kelly announced her immediate retirement from race riding following the news she was expecting her first child.

== Personal life ==
Kelly married her partner of more than 12-years in July 2019.

== Major wins ==
- Betway Bowl - Tea For Two (2017)
- Kauto Star Novices' Chase - Tea For Two (2015)
