= Timico =

Timico Ltd
- Type: Private limited company
- Industry: Information Technology and Managed Services
- Founded: 2004
- Headquarters: Newark-on-Trent, Nottinghamshire, England, UK
- Key people: Neil Muller CEO, John Holt COO, David Jones CPO, Scotty Morgan CSO, Martin Riley CTO.
- Products: Broadband services, Unified Communications, Hosting Services, Private Wide Area Networks, Mobile Device Management

Timico was an Information Technology Managed Services provider in the United Kingdom. In June 2021, Timico was rebranded to Digital Space.

== Company overview ==
Timico gained a top 10 place in The Sunday Times Tech Track Fastest Growing Companies list, and in 2009 were ranked 7th in the Deloitte Technology Fast 50. Timico was founded by Tim Radford who previously ran Project Telecom, a mobile service provider which was sold to Vodafone in 2003 for £162m. The company moved into purpose built offices in Newark-on-Trent, Nottinghamshire, in January 2007, from the Chairman's family barns, which previously housed the company. Timico announced its intention to float the company on the Alternative Investment Market in May 2014, but later abandoned these plans citing poor market sentiment. Timico was confirmed as the new sponsor of the Cheltenham Gold Cup in December 2015. Timico appointed Ben Marnham as the new chief executive officer on 1 September 2016, prior to an MBO by Horizon Capital. As part of the MBO new leadership was brought in to help execute strategic change including Martin Riley as CTO and Kirsty Johnson as Operations Director. Timico appointed Neil Muller as the new chief executive officer on 5 November 2018, he joins John Holt as the Chief Operations Office and Ben Savage as the MD Sales & Marketing.

In October 2022, Digital Space was acquired by Graphite Capital.

== Acquisition history ==
Timico has acquired nine smaller companies including business ISPs, a managed IT service provider, unified communications provider and a mobile applications specialist.

- 2004 – Atlas Internet which has been consolidated into Timico
- 2009 – KeConnect and Twang which have been consolidated. Twang was acquired at £1,625,000
- 2010 – NewNet which now forms its Partner Services division – Acquired for £2,350,000. Newnet operates an access network utilising Local-loop unbundling from 11 exchanges in and around Fareham
- 2010 – Handheld PCs – a business which specialised in media capture software for mobile devices which was acquired for £400,000 has been consolidated into Timico
- 2011 – Powernet which was consolidated into Timico in December 2013 and now forms its Managed Networks division
- 2012 – Redwood Telecommunications which was acquired for an undisclosed sum. Redwood was consolidated into Timico in June 2013 and now forms its Unified Communications division
- 2015 – Wirebird, a managed services and IT consultancy business, which was acquired for an undisclosed sum and was rebranded Timico Technology Services in March 2015
- 2015 – Coms which was acquired for £2.5M and comprised the brands ADSL24, Actimax, CloudXL and Universal. It has been fully consolidated into Timico
- 2018 – 25SevenIT a managed services and IT consultancy business, which was acquired for an undisclosed sum in November 2018.

== Newark data centre ==
Work began in 2011 to build a £7M combined office and data centre to cope with business expansion and new virtualised hosting services. The facility was officially opened by Newark MP Patrick Mercer on 18 January 2012. The opening ceremony was included in an ITV Central news article about cloud computing.

The tier three facility contains two 2,000 square foot data halls, each with 72 racks for co-location. Virtualised computing and storage is provided by Cisco's Unified Computing System and EMC's VNX platform. Network infrastructure utilises a Juniper MX80 IP Switching platform with 10 Gbit/s fibre internet connectivity.

The Duke of Kent visited the facility in September 2013. Chancellor George Osborne also toured the data centre and met technical apprentices while campaigning for the 2014 Newark by-election.

== Blogging and publicity ==
Timico's former CTO Trefor Davies, a prolific blogger, has employed unusual tactics to highlight internet industry issues and causes including using a pigeon to highlight the problem of slow broadband speeds in Lincolnshire in September 2010. On 5 January 2012 an attempt to beat the world record for the most number of comments on an online news article in 24 hours ran in support of the RNLI. More than 5,000 unique comments were made, but following verification from the Guinness World Records it was confirmed this did not beat the official world record, which is held by a Japanese recording artist who achieved more than 56,800 comments to his blog in 2011. Trefor left Timico on 20 December 2013 to develop his blog into a commercial venture.
