= Oliver Sherwood =

British National Hunt Trainer (born 1955)

Oliver Martin Carwardine Sherwood (born 23 March 1955) is a British horse trainer who specialises in training horses that compete in National Hunt racing. He began training in 1984, sending out over 1,100 winners, before retiring as a trainer in 2023, to become an assistant trainer. Sherwood's most notable achievements were winning the Hennesy Gold Cup in 2014, and Grand National in 2015, both with Many Clouds.

== Background ==
Sherwood was born 23 March 1955, to his father Nat Sherwood and mother Heather Sherwood. His parents were successful Point-to-point jockeys, both of whom winning races during the 1950s and 1960s. Sherwood's younger brother, Simon, was a successful jockey best noted for winning the 1989 Cheltenham Gold Cup on Desert Orchid.

== Career ==
=== Jockey ===
Sherwood began his career a successful amateur jockey. His first win was riding 'Jack's The Buoy' at Dromahane Point to Point Races Mallow, County Cork in 1976. He had three victories at the Cheltenham Festival, winning the Sun Alliance Novices Hurdle in 1979 on 'Venture to Cognac', the Christie's Foxhunters' Chase in 1980 on 'Rolls Rambler', and repeated his Foxhunter success in 1984 on 'Venture to Cognac'. He was Amateur champion champion in 1979-80 with 29 wins.

=== Trainer ===
Sherwood began training in 1984. Some of the most famous horses he has trained over the years include: Arctic Call, Be Rude Not To, Claymore, Coulton, Cruising Altitude, Eric’s Charm, Him Of Praise, Hulysse Royal, Jaunty Flight, Large Action, Lord Of The River, Manorson, Mischievous Milly, Monkerhostin, Puffin Billy, Tildarg, The Breener, The West Awake, and Young Snugfit.

Sherwood trained four of the Mares Final (Newbury) winners: Atrabates (1986), Northern Jinx (1989), Jaunty Flight (2008) and Argento Luna (2009). He also won the Challow Hurdle three times, the Sun Alliance Novice Hurdle twice, the Bula Hurdle three times, the Scottish Champion Hurdle, the Arkle Trophy, the Tingle Greek Chase, the Hennessy Gold Cup, the EBF Novices Hurdle twice, the Hoechst Regumate Mares Novice Hurdle Final, twice, the Glenlivet Hurdle, the Seagram 100 Pipers Top Novice Chase, the Singer and Freidlander National Trial and the Reynoldstown Novices Chase, and the Sun Alliance Chase.

Sherwood won the Hennesy Gold Cup with Many Clouds in 2014. Many Clouds went on provide Sherwood's most notable achievement, winning the Grand National in 2015.

Sherwood announced his retirement from training in June 2023, when his stables were longer sustainable with just 30 to 35 horses. His time as a trainer had lasted 39 years, and he had sent out over 1,100 winners. He became assistant trainer to Harry Derham.

== Stables ==
Oliver Sherwood trained his horses at Rhonehurst, Lambourn, from 1984 to 2021. He moved out of Rhonehurst in 2021, to rent Neardown Stables, Upper Lambourn. The yard is owned by successful ex-trainer Charlie Mann, who retired in 2021 with over 800 winners. Sherwood left Neardown when he retired in 2023.

== Education ==
Sherwood attended public school at Radley and confessed he was not good academically.

== Personal data ==
Sherwood married Tarnya in 1993, they have a daughter and a son. Tarnya also had a love for horses, being a National Hunt jockey before meeting Oliver, riding winners as a professional under rules. In 1989, she rode in the Grand National on Numerate, pulling up at the 21st fence. He was previously married to Denise, daughter of Fred Winter. He enjoys playing cricket and was the Lambourn Xl Captain. He also supports the UK's Chelsea Football Team.
