= National Hunt flat race =

Horse race

National Hunt flat races, informally known as bumper races, are a type of flat racing but run under National Hunt racing rules in Britain and Ireland.

National Hunt flat races were created on 15 July 1891 when a conference between the stewards of the British and Irish National Hunt Committees decided to abolish the distinction between the hunter and handicap horses and created a new amalgamated rule:

A horse shall be deemed qualified to run for a National Hunt flat race which has not run after the age of three years, or won after the age of two years, under the recognised rules of flat racing in any country, which has been placed first, second, or third in a steeplechase in Great Britain or Ireland, and which has jumped all the fences and completed the whole distance of the race to the satisfaction of, at least, two of the Stewards, to whom previous notice have been given in writing through the Clerk of the Course.

— National Hunt racing, 1891, amalgamated Rules 180 and 181

In modern days the National Hunt flat races are designed for horses who have not previously run under any other form of racing except National Hunt flat or French AQPS races and in Great Britain are restricted to horses aged seven years or less. They are used by trainers to give horses experience on a racecourse before beginning a career in jumps racing. Because of the lack of fences and hurdles, the horses sometimes run faster; however, the low quality of many of these races, and that horses are only taking part to gain experience, often results in a slow pace. Bumpers are typically put at the end of a race meeting and such races are notorious for being difficult to predict the winner. The vast majority of National Hunt meetings in Ireland include a bumper. They are run much less frequently in Britain.

The term "bumper" arose because in the past only amateur riders were allowed to compete and had an ungainly bumping style in comparison to the professionals.

Bumpers are most commonly run over distances of 13–20 furlongs.
