= Richard Johnson (jockey) =

English National Hunt jockey (born 1977)

Richard Johnson OBE
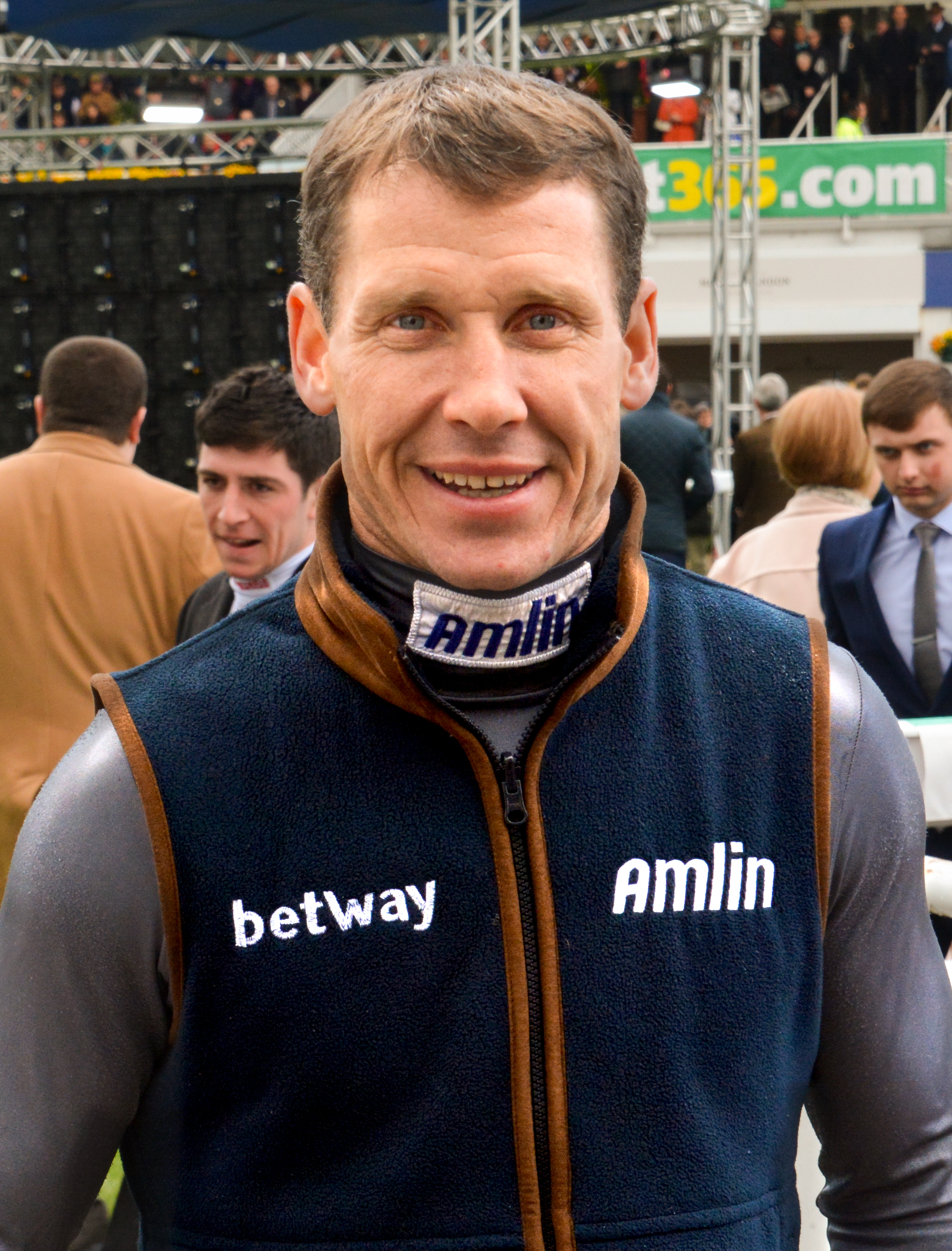
- Johnson crowned Champion Jockey at Sandown, April 2016

Personal information
- Born: 21 July 1977 (age 49) Hereford, England
- Occupation: Jockey
- Height: 1.71 m (5 ft 7 in)

Horse racing career
- Sport: Horse racing
- Career wins: 3,818 GB & IRE NH, 4 GB Flat

Major racing wins
- Cheltenham Gold Cup (2), Champion Hurdle, Queen Mother Champion Chase, Scottish Grand National, Welsh Grand National (2), RSA Insurance Novices' Chase, Stayers' Hurdle, Triumph Hurdle (3), Punchestown Gold Cup, Bet365 Gold Cup (2), James Nicholson Wine Merchant Champion Chase, Irish Gold Cup (2), Tingle Creek Chase, Arkle Challenge Trophy, Midlands Grand National.

Racing awards
- British jump racing Champion Jockey four times (2016, 2017, 2018, 2019)

Honours
- Officer of the Order of the British Empire

Significant horses
- Looks Like Trouble, Native River, Flagship Uberalles, Rooster Booster, Anzum, Detroit City, Lacdoudal, Florida Pearl

Cheltenham Gold Cup (2)
2018
Native River	Might Bite	Anibale Fly
2000
Looks Like Trouble	Florida Pearl	Strong Promise

Queen Mother Champion Chase
2002
Flagship Uberalles	Native Upmanship	Cenkos

Champion Hurdle
2003
Rooster Booster	Westender	Rhinestone Cowboy

Scottish Grand National
2011
Beshabar	Merigo	Always Right

Welsh Grand National (2)
2016
Native River	Raz De Maree	Houblon Des Obeaux
1999
Edmond	Forest Ivory	Earthmover

Richard Johnson (born 21 July 1977) is a retired English National Hunt jockey. He was Champion Jockey on four occasions and runner-up 17 times. With over 3,500 winners, Johnson is the second most prolific winner in the history of National Hunt Racing behind Sir Anthony McCoy. He holds the record for the most appearances in the Grand National and also for the most rides in the race without a victory. Johnson twice won the Cheltenham Gold Cup, on Looks Like Trouble in 2000 and Native River in 2018, and the Champion Hurdle on Rooster Booster in 2003.

== Background and early career ==
Johnson comes from a racing family with his father being an amateur jockey and his mother, Sue Johnson, a successful trainer. He left school at 16 to work for "The Duke" – David Nicholson who was a major influence on Johnson's racing career and supported him in his bid to become a professional jockey. Johnson's first winner under rules was on Rusty Bridge at Hereford in April 1994 and he became Champion conditional jockey in the 1995/96 season, at the age of 18.

== Jockey career ==
=== First 1000 winners (1994 to 2003) ===
Johnson's first winner was his only winner in the 1993–1994 season. In the following season he rode 12 winners and the year after in the 1995–96 season he rode 56 winners. Johnson rode 100 winners in a season for the first time in 1996–97, with 102 wins. From the 1996–97 season onwards Johnson has ridden over 100 winners each season.

In 1996 Johnson won his first Grade 1 race, the Heineken Gold Cup aboard Billygoat Gruff, trained by David Nicholson. His second Grade 1 winner came in 1998 on Zafarabad in the I.A.W.S. Champion Four Year Old Hurdle, again trained by Nicholson. In this period Johnson also won his first Welsh Grand National (not a Grade 1) in 1999. Johnson's first Irish Gold Cup victory came in 2001 Florida Pearl, trained by Willie Mullins. Flagship Uberalles won the 2000 Tingle Creek Chase and would become one of the most fruitful horses in Johnson's career.

Johnson has had great success at the Cheltenham Festival. His first win at Cheltenham was on Anzum in the 1999 Stayers' Hurdle. He won the 2000 Cheltenham Gold Cup with Looks Like Trouble and the 2002 Queen Mother Champion Chase with Flagship Uberalles. Johnson was top jockey at the 2002 Cheltenham Festival with 2 wins. Johnson was also victorious in the 2003 Champion Hurdle with the Philip Hobbs-trained Rooster Booster on which he would also come second in 2004. The 2003 festival also delivered the RSA Chase on One Knight. Looks Like Trouble delivered a further victory in the James Nicholson Wine Merchant Champion Chase (now the Ladbrokes Champion Chase).

In April 2003, Johnson became the eighth National Hunt jockey to ride 1,000 winners in Britain on Quedex at Stratford.

=== Continued success and 2000 winners (2003 to 2009) ===
2004 brought a second victory in the Irish Gold Cup, again aboard Florida Pearl.

Johnson won the 2006 Betfred Gold Cup on Lacdoudal and scored a second win in the race on Monkerhostin in 2008 under its current sponsor-based title, the Bet365 Gold Cup. Both winners were trained by Philip Hobbs.

In December 2009 Johnson became only the second rider after AP McCoy to ride 2000 winners, riding Fighting Chance to victory in the Wheels Up in the Powersolve Electronics Greatwood Charity Handicap Chase at Newbury.

=== First championship and 3000 winners (2009 to 2016) ===
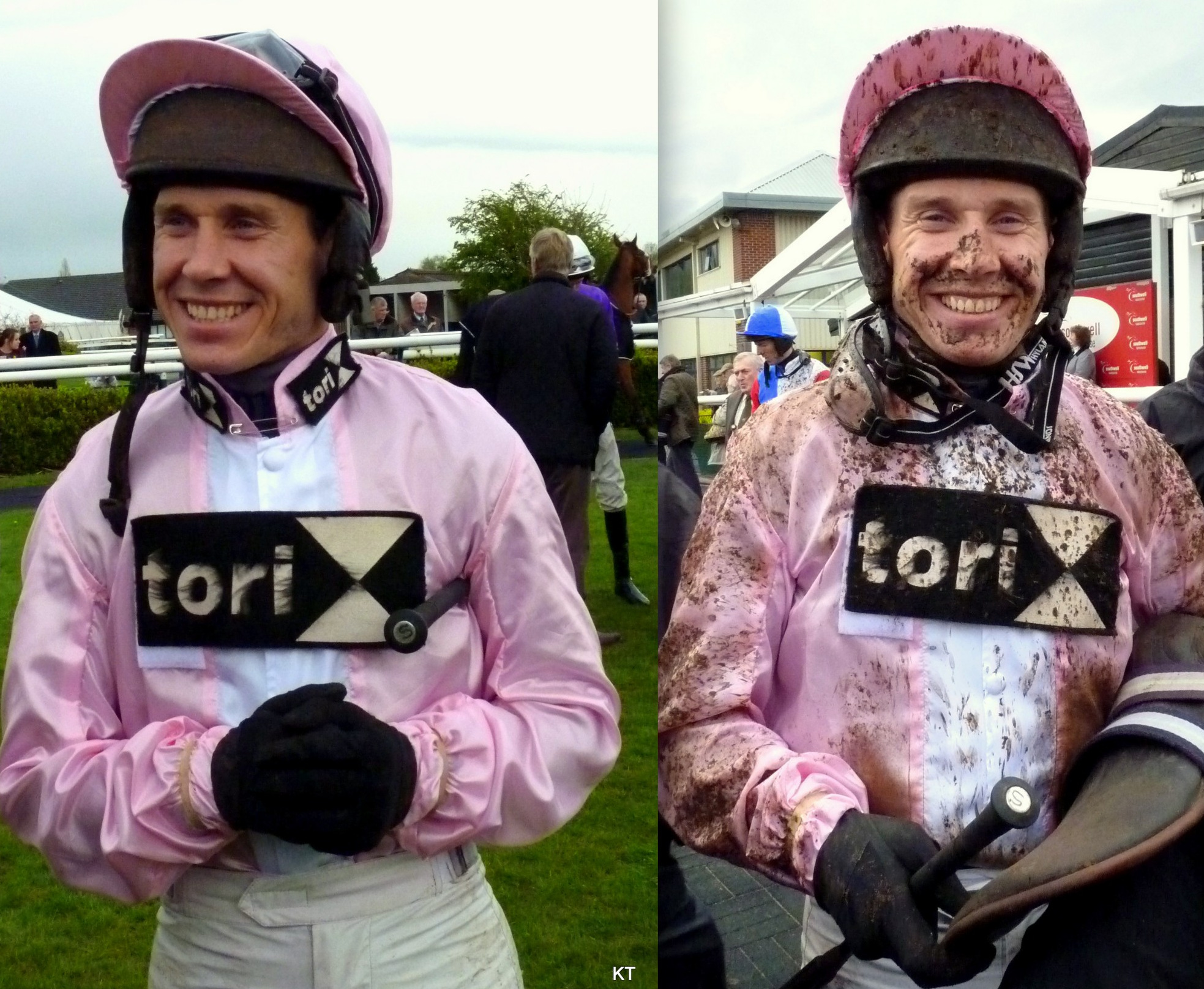
Johnson in 2012

In this period Johnson saw further success, riding 100 winners each season but continued to finished second to Tony McCoy in the Jockeys Championship. The 2010 season brought victory in the Punchestown Gold Cup, riding Planet of Sound who was trained by Philip Hobbs. In 2011, Johnson won his first Scottish Grand National, piloting Beshabar to victory. Johnson also won the Arkle Challenge Trophy in 2011 aboard Captain Chris. Johnson won the Midlands Grand National in 2014 on Goulanes.

The 3,000th winner came on board St. Saviour at Ludlow on 4 January 2016. In the same season, having been runner up to Tony McCoy on 16 occasions throughout McCoy's 20-year dominance of the Champion Jockey title, Johnson was finally crowned champion for the first time in 2016 following McCoy's retirement the previous season. 2016 also delivered Johnson a second Welsh Grand National, riding Native River, a horse that would deliver him subsequent success at the Cheltenham Festival.

=== Further championships and second Cheltenham Gold Cup (2016–2021) ===
Having won his first championship, Johnson followed this up with three further title wins in 2017, 2018 and 2019. Following a broken arm, Johnson finished second in the 2020 Championship to Brian Hughes.

This period of Johnson's career saw further success at the Cheltenham Festival. Johnson won the 2017 JCB Triumph Hurdle at Cheltenham on Defi Du Seuil and finished third in the Cheltenham Gold Cup on Native River for trainer Colin Tizzard. This combination would subsequently go on to win the 2018 running of the Cheltenham Gold Cup, beating the favourite Might Bite.

On 3 April 2021 Johnson announced his immediate retirement at a meeting at Newton Abbot.

== Personal life ==
Order of the British Empire ribbon

For five years Johnson lived with the Queen's granddaughter Zara Phillips, a relationship that created a great deal of media interest. The couple split in 2003. Johnson subsequently married Fiona Chance whose father, Noel Chance, was the trainer of Looks Like Trouble. They have three children and as of 2018, Looks Like Trouble lived with them as a "family pet" in the words of Johnson who joked that he "gained a wife and a father-in-law and everything else out of it".

Johnson was appointed an Officer of the Order of the British Empire (OBE) in the 2019 New Year Honours for services to Horse Racing.

== Grand National record ==
He has ridden in the Grand National 21 times, which is a record. He also has the record for most rides without a winner.

Grand National
Year	Mount	Finish
1997	Celtic Abbey	Unseated rider
1998	Banjo	Fell
1999	Baronet	Fell
2000	Star Traveller	Pulled up
2001	Edmond	Fell
2002	What's Up Boys	2nd
2003	Behrajan	10th
2004	What's Up Boys	Brought down
2005	Jakari	Pulled up
2006	Therealbandit	Pulled up
2007	Monkerhostin	Refused
2008	Turko	Fell
2009	Parson's Legacy	Fell
2010	Tricky Trickster	9th
2011	Quinz	Pulled up
2012	Planet of Sound	12th
2013	Balthazar King	15th
2014	Balthazar King	2nd
2015	Balthazar King	Fell
2016	Kruzhilin	Pulled up
2019	Rock The Kasbah	Brought Down

== Johnson v McCoy ==
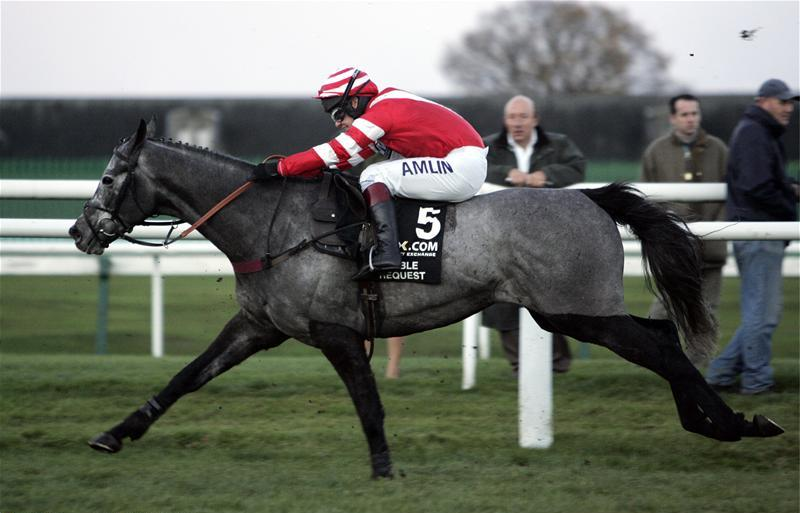
Richard Johnson on Noble Request at the 2006 Fighting Fifth Hurdle

Season	RJ GB Wins	AM GB Wins	RJ IRE wins	AM IRE Wins
2020-21	73	0	0	0
2019-20	122	0	0	0
2018-19	200	0	1	0
2017-18	176	0	0	0
2016-17	189	0	0	0
2015-16	235	0	1	0
2014-15	152	231	0	10
2013-14	155	218	1	11
2012-13	133	185	0	8
2011-12	153	199	1	12
2010-11	151	218	3	6
2009-10	160	195	1	6
2008-09	132	186	1	5
2007-08	122	140	0	8
2006-07	154	184	0	7
2005-06	167	178	0	22
2004-05	135	200	0	13
2003-04	186	209	2	0
2002-03	147	258	1	0
2001-02	132	289	0	1
2000-01	162	191	2	0
1999-00	142	245	1	7
1998-99	133	186	1	4
1997-98	120	253	1	8
1996-97	102	190	1	2
1995-96	53	175	1	7
1994-95	12	74	0	4
1993-94	1	0	0	3
Total	3799	4204	19	144

== Career statistics ==
=== Big race wins ===
Cheltenham Festival (22)

- Cheltenham Gold Cup - (2) Looks Like Trouble (2000), Native River (2018)
- Champion Hurdle - (1) Rooster Booster (2003)
- Queen Mother Champion Chase - (1) Flagship Uberalles (2002)
- Stayers' Hurdle - (1) Anzum (1999)
- Triumph Hurdle - (3) Made in Japan (2004), Detroit City (2006), Defi du Seuil (2017)
- Supreme Novices' Hurdle - (1) Menorah (2010)
- Champion Bumper - (1) Cheltenian (2011)
- Baring Bingham Novices' Hurdle - (1) Massini's Maguire (2007)
- Arkle Challenge Trophy - (1) Captain Chris (2011)
- RSA Insurance Novices' Chase - (1) One Knight (2003)
- Centenary Novices' Handicap Chase - (1) Copper Bleu (2010)
- Coral Cup - (1) Monkerhostin (2004)
- Glenfarclas Cross Country Chase - (2) Balthazar King (2012,2014)
- Fred Winter Juvenile Novices' Handicap Hurdle - (1) Flying Tiger (2017)
- Pertemps Final - (1) Fingal Bay (2014)
- Brown Advisory & Merriebelle Stable Plate Handicap Chase - (2) Dark Stranger (2000), Young Spartacus (2003)
- County Handicap Hurdle - (1) Rooster Booster (2002)

Other notable races

(United Kingdom) Great Britain

- Tingle Creek Chase - (1) Flagship Uberalles (2000)
- Long Walk Hurdle - (4) Anzum (1999), Mighty Man (2006), Reve di Sivola (2012, 2013)
- Henry VIII Novices' Chase - (1) Fair Along (2006)
- Kauto Star Novices' Chase - (1) La Bague Au Roi (2018)
- Finale Juvenile Hurdle - (3) Franchoek (2007), Le Rocher (2013), Defi Du Seuil (2016)
- Challow Novices' Hurdle (2) Fingal Bay (2012), Thyme Hill (2020)
- Ascot Chase - (1) Captain Chris (2014)
- Manifesto Novices' Chase - (2) Wishfull Thinking (2011), Menorah (2012)
- Anniversary 4-Y-O Novices' Hurdle - (2) Lord Brex (2000), Detroit City (2006)
- Betway Bowl - (1) Escartefigue (1998)
- Top Novices' Hurdle - (5) Midnight Legend (1997), Phardante Flyer (2000), In Contrast (2002), Mighty Man (2005), Lalor (2018)
- Mildmay Novices' Chase - (3) Spendid (1999), What's Up Boys (2001), Native River (2016)
- Sefton Novices' Hurdle - (2) Forest Ivory (1997), Saint Are (2011)
- Liverpool Hurdle - (2) Mighty Man (2006, 2007)
- Scilly Isles Novices' Chase - (1) Sporting John (2021)

(Republic of Ireland) Ireland

- Irish Gold Cup - (2) Florida Pearl (2001, 2004)
- Punchestown Gold Cup - (1) Planet of Sound (2010)
- Champion Stayers Hurdle - (1) Anzum (1999)
- Punchestown Champion Chase - (1) Flagship Uberalles (2003)
- Ladbrokes Champion Chase - (1) Looks Like Trouble (2000)
- Dr P. J. Moriarty Novice Chase - (1) La Bague Au Roi (2019)
- Herald Champion Novice Hurdle - (1) Midnight Legend (1997)
- Ryanair Novice Chase - (1) Captain Chris (2011)
- Alanna Homes Champion Novice Hurdle - (2) What's Up Boys (2000), Spirit of Adjisa (2011)
- Champion Four Year Old Hurdle - (1) Zafarabad (1998)
