= Novice (racehorse) =

Inexperienced racehorse

A novice in horse racing is an inexperienced racehorse which has not run in a certain number of races of a particular type, or not won in such races. The definition of a novice is determined by the horse racing authority in a particular country or area.

== Flat racing ==
In British Flat racing novice races are generally restricted to horses which have not won more than twice, have not won a race of a particular status or have not run more than twice. Specific conditions apply to auction races restricted to horses sold at public auctions.

== National Hunt racing ==
A novice in National Hunt horse racing is a horse which has not won in a particular type of race prior to the start of the current season. A novice hurdler has not won a hurdle race before the start of the current season, while a novice chaser has not won a steeplechase before the start of the current season.

A horse remains a novice until the end of the season in which it gains its first win in that particular category, no matter how many wins it achieves. Generally novices race against other novices although there is no restriction preventing novices competing against more experienced rivals. Occasionally a novice wins a major race outside novice company - Captain Christy in 1974 and Coneygree in 2015 won the Cheltenham Gold Cup as novices, as did Make A Stand in the 1997 Champion Hurdle. Noble Yeats won the 2022 Grand National as a novice.

A modern development has seen a concession whereby horses that record their first win in a given sphere in March or April may contest novice events up to 31 October of that year. This period was extended to 30 November from the 2022–23 season in British National Hunt racing.

== Principal novice races ==
The most important races run for novices in Great Britain are all run as Grade 1 events at the Cheltenham Festival

- Brown Advisory Novices' Chase run over three miles 110 yards.
- Arkle Challenge Trophy run over two miles (3 km).
- Ballymore Novices' Hurdle run over two miles five furlongs.
- Supreme Novices' Hurdle run over two miles 110 yards.
- Triumph Hurdle run over two miles one furlong and restricted to four-year-olds only.

== See also ==
- Horse racing in Great Britain
- List of British National Hunt races
