= Colin Tizzard =

British racehorse trainer

Personal information
- Born: 7 January 1956 (age 70) Milborne Port, Somerset
- Occupation: Trainer

Horse racing career
- Sport: Horse racing
- Career wins: As a National Hunt jockey: As a National Hunt Trainer:

Major racing wins
- As a trainer in UK National Hunt Grade Ones King George VI Chase (2015) (2016); World Hurdle (2016); Betfair Chase (2013, 2015); Ascot Chase (2013); Long Walk Hurdle (2015); Aintree Hurdle (2016); Liverpool Hurdle (2016) Mildmay Novices' Chase (2016); Kauto Star Novices' Chase (2016); Melling Chase (2017); Top Novices' Hurdle (2017); Tolworth Hurdle (2017); Mersey Novices' Hurdle (2017) Cheltenham Gold Cup (2018)

Significant horses
- Cue Card, Thistlecrack, Native River, Fox Norton, Finian's Oscar

Colin Tizzard (born 7 January 1956) is a British racehorse trainer specializing in National Hunt racing. He held a full training licence from 1998 until 2022. In 2010 Tizzard trained Cue Card to victory in the Cheltenham Festival Champion Bumper. In 2014 Tizzard trained Cue Card to victory in the Ryanair Chase at the Cheltenham Festival. In the 2015 King George VI Chase he trained Cue Card to victory. At the 2016 Cheltenham Festival Thistlecrack won the World Hurdle to give Tizzard his first success in that race. At the 2018 Cheltenham Festival, Tizzard trained the winner in the Cheltenham Gold Cup Native River, as well as the winner of the Albert Bartlett Novice's Hurdle Kilbricken Storm.

Tizzard relinquished his training licence at the end of the 2021-22 National Hunt season, handing over to his son, Joe. Tizzard saddled his final runners at Chepstow's meeting on 22 April 2022, but will continue to assist in the training operation as Joe takes over the licence.
