= Altcar Novices' Chase =

Steeplechase horse race in Britain

Altcar Novices' Chase
2022
Minella Drama	Hardy Du Seuil	Shakem Up'arry

Previous years
2021
Silver Hallmark	Marown	Galahad Quest

2020-2011
2020
Sam Brown	Knight In Dubai	Joke Dancer
2019
Castafiore	Jerrysback	Crucial Role
2018
Testify	Lake View Lad	Only two finished
2017
Waiting Patiently	Politologue	Its'afreebee
2016
Bristol De Mai	Amore Alato	Otago Trail
2015
Wakanda	Cogry	Colour Squadron
2014
Taquin Du Seuil	Coverholder	Knock A Hand
2012
Our Mick	State Benefit	Majala

2010-2001
2010
Diamond Harry	Knockara Beau	Mumbles Head
2009
Will Be Done	Tartak	Turkish Surprise
2007
My Way de Solzen	Regal Heights	The Cool Guy
2006
Don't Be Shy	New Alco	Eskimo Pie
2005
Jazz d'Estruval	Trabolgan	Sonevafushi
2004
Our Armageddon	Full Irish	Valleymore
2003
It Takes Time	The Bajan Bandit	Claymore
2002
Ifni Du Luc	Direct Access	Be My Dream

2000-1996
2000
Toto Toscato	Carandrew	Bosuns Mate
1999
Fourth In Line	Scrahan Cross	Gallant Taffy
1998
Diwali Dancer	One Word	Only two finished
1997
Simply Dashing	Ballyline	Flimsy Truth
1996
Nahthen Lad	Billygoat Gruff	Chief Raider

The Altcar Novices' Chase was a Grade 2 National Hunt steeplechase in Great Britain which was open to horses aged five years or above. It is run at Haydock Park over a distance of about 2 miles and 4 furlongs (2 miles 3 furlongs and 203 yards, or 4,099 metres), and during its running there are seventeen fences to be jumped. The race is for novice chasers, and it was scheduled to take place each year in January.

The race was first run in 1996. Between 2000 and 2005, the race was run over a distance of 2 miles and 6 furlongs, before being switched back to its current distance in 2006. From 2012 to 2016, it was run under various sponsored titles.

In April 2023 the British Horseracing Authority announced the removal of the race from the 2023/24 programme.

== Winners ==
Year	Winner	Jockey	Trainer
1996	Nahthen Lad	Warren Marston	Jenny Pitman
1997	Simply Dashing	Richard Dunwoody	Mick Easterby
1998	Diwali Dancer	Tony McCoy	Martin Pipe
1999	Fourth in Line	Norman Williamson	Venetia Williams
2000	Toto Toscato	Richard Johnson	Alan King
2001	Abandoned due to frost
2002	Ifni Du Luc	Mick Fitzgerald	Nicky Henderson
2003	It Takes Time	Tony McCoy	Martin Pipe
2004	Our Armageddon	Liam McGrath	Richard Guest
2005	Jazz D'Estruval	Tony Dobbin	Nicky Richards
2006	Don't Be Shy	Timmy Murphy	Martin Pipe
2007	My Way de Solzen	Robert Thornton	Alan King
2008	Abandoned due to waterlogged state of course
2009	Will Be Done	Jason Maguire	Donald McCain, Jr.
2010	Diamond Harry	Barry Geraghty	Nick Williams
	no race 2011 (Note: The 2011 race was abandoned due to frost)
2012	Our Mick	Jason Maguire	Donald McCain, Jr.
	no race 2013 (Note: The 2013 race was abandoned due to snow)
2014	Taquin Du Seuil	Tony McCoy	Jonjo O'Neill
2015	Wakanda	Danny Cook	Sue Smith
2016	Bristol De Mai	Daryl Jacob	Nigel Twiston-Davies
2017	Waiting Patiently	Brian Hughes	Malcolm Jefferson
2018	Testify	Will Kennedy	Donald McCain, Jr.
2019	Castafiore	Paul O'Brien	Charlie Longsdon
2020	Sam Brown	Aidan Coleman	Anthony Honeyball
2021	Silver Hallmark	Adam Wedge	Fergal O'Brien
2022	Minella Drama	Brian Hughes	Donald McCain Jr

== See also ==
- Horse racing in Great Britain
- List of British National Hunt races

== Sources ==
- Racing Post:
  - 1996, 1997, 1998, 1999, 2000, 2002, 2003, 2004, 2005
  - 2006, 20072009, 2012, 2014, 2015
  - 2016, 2017, 2018, 2019, 2020, 2021
