= Future Champion Novices' Chase =

Steeplechase horse race in Britain

- Class: Grade 2
- Location: Ayr Racecourse; Ayrshire, Scotland
- Race type: Steeplechase
- Sponsor: Jordan Electrics
- Website: Ayr

Race information
- Distance: 2m 4½f (4,163 metres)
- Surface: Turf
- Track: Left-handed
- Qualification: Five-years-old and up
- Weight: 11 st 0 lb Allowances; 7 lb for mares Penalties for wins 5 lb for Class 1 wfa chase 3 lb for Class 2 wfa or Class 1 hcap chase
- Purse: £24,000 (2021); 1st: £13,855

Future Champion Novices' Chase
2023
Datsalrightgino	Thunder Rock	Unexpected Party

Previous years
2022
Do Your Job	Minella Drama	Il Ridoto
2021
Allmankind	Malystic	Whoshotthesheriff

2020-2011
2019
Secret Investor	Louis' Vac Pouch	Monbeg Legend
2018
Bigmartre	Cobra De Mai	Only two finished
2017
Cloudy Dream	Theinval	Oldgrangewood
2016
Le Mercurey	Bristol De Mai	Otago Trail
2015
Top Gamble	Seventh Sky	Solar Impulse
2014
Eduard	Valdez	Aibrean
2013
Rajdhani Express	Tap Night	Desert Cry
2012
Pacha Du Polder	Rival D'estruval	Lidar
2011
Gilbarry	Sam Lord	Nadiya De La Vega

2010-2001
2010
French Opera	Tchico Polos	Fiendish Flame
2009
Deep Purple	I'msingingtheblues	Raysrock
2008
Starzaan	Noland	Frankie Figg
2007
Natal	Faasel	Harmony Brig
2006
Monet's Garden	Le Volfoni	Kasthari
2005
Locksmith	My Will	Fool on the Hill
2004
Keltic Bard	Thisthatandtother	Better Days
2003
Vol Solitaire	Tarxien	Farmer Jack
2002
Valley Henry	Man on the Hill	Big-And-Bold
2001
Grey Abbey	Hugo De Grez	Running Moss

2000-1991
2000
Gingembre	Spirit Dancer	Bosuns Mate
1999
Bouchasson	Scotia Nostra	Irbee
1998
Eirespray	Edelweis Du Moulin	Ingletonian
1997
Sparky Gayle	Macgeorge	Stately Home
1996
Addington Boy	Challenger Du Luc	Oscail An Doras
1995
Dancing Paddy	Morceli	Wee River
1994
See More Indians	Gallateen	Rouyan
1993
Cab On Target	Persian House	Montpelier Lad
1992
The Illywhacker	Armagret	Whaat Fettle
1991
High Knowl	Lothian Captain	Young Benz

1990-1988
1990
Celtic Shot	Young Snugfit	Highfrith
1989
Southern Minstrel	Interim Lib	Tartan Tailor
1988
Jim Thorpe	Colonel Rose	High Debate

The Future Champion Novices' Chase was a Grade 2 National Hunt steeplechase in Great Britain which was open to horses aged five years or older. It was run at Ayr, Scotland, over a distance of about 2 miles, 4 furlongs and 110 yards (4,163 metres), and during its running there were seventeen fences to be jumped. The race was for novice chasers, but was cut from the race calendar ahead of the 2023/24 National Hunt season.

The event was formerly contested over 2 miles, and for a period it was known by various sponsored titles. It was renamed in 1988, and it was extended to 2 miles 4 furlongs and given Grade 1 status in 1991. It returned to its former length for a single running in 1995, and at this point it was relegated to Grade 2 level.

The Future Champion Novices' Chase is run at Ayr on the same afternoon as the Scottish Grand National. The winners Gingembre and Grey Abbey both subsequently achieved victory in the latter race.

In April 2023 the British Horseracing Authority announced the removal of the race from the 2023/24 programme.

== Records ==
Leading jockey since 1968 (3 wins):
- Ron Barry – The Benign Bishop (1973), Easby Abbey (1975), Little Bay (1981)
- Jonjo O'Neill – Crofton Hall (1977), King Weasel (1978), Night Nurse (1979)
- Ruby Walsh - Val Solitaire (2003), Natal (2007), Pacha du Polder (2012)

Leading trainer since 1968 (7 wins):

- Paul Nicholls - See More Indians (1994), Valley Henry (2002), Val Solitaire (2003), Natal (2007), Pacha du Polder (2012), Le Mercurey (2016), Secret Investor (2019)

== Winners ==
Year	Winner	Age	Jockey	Trainer
1968	Certainement	6	Stan Mellor	Edward Courage
1969	Chesapeake Bay	6	Gerry Scott	Neville Crump
1970	Mischievous Monk	6	Stan Hayhurst	Lord Kilmany
1971	Chorus	10	Stan Mellor	Harry Thomson Jones
1972	Avondhu	9	Peter Brogan	P Chesmore
1973	The Benign Bishop	6	Ron Barry	Ken Oliver
1974	Winter Rain	6	Michael Dickinson	Tony Dickinson
1975	Easby Abbey	8	Ron Barry	Peter Easterby
1976	Cromwell Road	6	David Goulding	Gordon W. Richards
1977	Crofton Hall	8	Jonjo O'Neill	J Dixon
1978	King Weasel	6	Jonjo O'Neill	Peter Easterby
1979	Night Nurse	8	Jonjo O'Neill	Peter Easterby
1980	Don't Forget	6	Ridley Lamb	Arthur Stephenson
1981	Little Bay	6	Ron Barry	Gordon W. Richards
1982	Full Sutton	9	Bob Davies	Derek Kent
1983	Mountain Hays	8	Alan Brown	Peter Easterby
1984	Noddy's Ryde	7	Neale Doughty	Gordon W. Richards
1985	Buck House	7	Tommy Carmody	Mouse Morris (Ir)
1986	Amber Rambler	7	Steve Youlden	Harry Wharton
1987	General Chandos	6	Johnny Bradburne (Note: amateur jockey)	Johnny Bradburne
1988	Jim Thorpe	7	Mark Dwyer	Gordon W. Richards
1989	Southern Minstrel	6	Chris Grant	Arthur Stephenson
1990	Celtic Shot	8	Graham McCourt	Charlie Brooks
1991	High Knowl	8	Graham McCourt	Martin Pipe
1992	The Illywhacker	7	Mark Pitman	Jenny Pitman
1993	Cab on Target	7	Peter Niven	Mary Reveley
1994	See More Indians	7	Richard Dunwoody	Paul Nicholls
1995	Dancing Paddy	7	Richard Dunwoody	Ken Cunningham-Brown
1996	Addington Boy	8	Tony Dobbin	Gordon W. Richards
1997	Sparky Gayle	7	Brian Storey	Colin Parker
1998	Eirespray	7	Richard Guest	Sue Smith
1999	Bouchasson	6	Robert Widger	Philip Hobbs
2000	Gingembre	6	Warren Marston	Lavinia Taylor
2001	Grey Abbey	7	Brian Harding	Barry Murtagh
2002	Valley Henry	7	Barry Geraghty	Paul Nicholls
2003	Vol Solitaire	5	Ruby Walsh	Paul Nicholls
2004	Keltic Bard	7	Noel Fehily	Charlie Mann
2005	Locksmith	5	Timmy Murphy	Martin Pipe
2006	Monet's Garden	8	Tony Dobbin	Nicky Richards
2007	Natal (Note: Yes Sir finished first in 2007, but he was subsequently disqualified after testing positive for a banned substance)	6	Ruby Walsh	Paul Nicholls
2008	Starzaan	9	Robert Thornton	Hughie Morrison
2009	Deep Purple	8	Paul Moloney	Evan Williams
2010	French Opera	7	Barry Geraghty	Nicky Henderson
2011	Gilbarry	6	Graham Lee	Malcolm Jefferson
2012	Pacha du Polder	5	Ruby Walsh	Paul Nicholls
2013	Rajdhani Express	6	Sam Waley-Cohen	Nicky Henderson
2014	Eduard	6	Brian Harding	Nicky Richards
2015	Top Gamble	7	Richard Johnson	Richard Lee
2016	Le Mercurey	6	Sam Twiston-Davies	Paul Nicholls
2017	Cloudy Dream	7	Brian Hughes	Malcolm Jefferson
2018	Bigmartre	7	Harry Bannister	Harry Whittington
2019	Secret Investor	7	Harry Cobden	Paul Nicholls
	no race 2020 (Note: The 2020 running was cancelled because of the COVID-19 pandemic in the United Kingdom)
2021	Allmankind	5	Harry Skelton	Dan Skelton
2022	Do Your Job	8	Richard Patrick	Michael Scudamore
2023	Datsalrightgino	7	Gavin Sheehan	Jamie Snowden

== See also ==
- Horse racing in Scotland
- List of British National Hunt races
