= Old Roan Chase =

Steeplechase horse race in Britain

- Class: Grade 2
- Location: Aintree Racecourse; Merseyside, England
- Inaugurated: 2004
- Race type: Steeplechase
- Website: thejockeyclub.co.uk/aintree/

Race information
- Distance: 2m 3f 200y (4,005 metres)
- Surface: Turf
- Track: Left-handed
- Qualification: Four-years-old and up
- Weight: Handicap
- Purse: £80,000 (2025); 1st: £45,560

Old Roan Chase
2025
Hitman	Master Chewy	Minella Drama

Previous years
2024
Minella Drama	Hitman	Ahoy Senor
2023
Jetoile	Minella Drama	Al Dancer
2022
Riders Onthe Storm	Hitman	Ga Law
2021
Allmankind	Itchy Feet	Midnight Shadow

2020-2011
2020
Nuts Well	Clondaw Castle	Itchy Feet
2019
Forest Bihan	Kalashnikov	Frodon
2018
Frodon	Javert	Cloudy Dream
2017
Smad Place	Cloudy Dream	Oldgrangewood
2016
Third Intention	God's Own	Vibrato Valtat
2015
Sound Investment	Wishfull Thinking	Buywise
2014
Wishfull Thinking	Edgardo Sol	Rolling Aces
2013
Conquisto	Astracad	Viva Colonia
2012
For Non Stop	Wishfull Thinking	Stagecoach Pearl
2011
Albertas Run	Pure Faith	Master Minded

2010-2004
2010
Monet's Garden	Poquelin	Tartak
2009
Monet's Garden	Tidal Bay	Knowhere
2008
Knowhere	Exotic Dancer	Snoopy Loopy
2007
Monet's Garden	Kauto Star	Exotic Dancer
2006
Kauto Star	Armaturk	Inca Trail
2005
Impek	My Will	Supreme Prince
2004
Farmer Jack	Take The Stand	Vodka Bleu

The Old Roan Chase is a Grade 2 National Hunt steeplechase in Great Britain which is open to horses aged four years or older. It is run on the Mildmay Course at Aintree over a distance of about 2 miles and 4 furlongs (2 miles 3 furlongs and 200 yards, or 4,023 metres), and during its running there are sixteen fences to be jumped. It is a limited handicap race, and it is scheduled to take place each year in late October.

The event was established in 2004, and it was initially called the Wigan Chase.

== Records ==
Most successful horse (3 wins):

- Monet's Garden – 2007, 2009, 2010

Leading trainer (4 wins):

- Paul Nicholls - Kauto Star (2006), Sound Investment (2015), Frodon (2018). Hitman (2025)

Leading jockey (3 wins):

- Brian Hughes - Forest Bihan (2019), Riders Onthe Storm (2022), Minella Drama (2024)

== Winners ==
- Weights given in stones and pounds.

Year	Winner	Age	Weight	Jockey	Trainer
2004	Farmer Jack	8	11-01	Paul Flynn	Philip Hobbs
2005	Impek	9	10-07	Timmy Murphy	Henrietta Knight
2006	Kauto Star	6	11-10	Ruby Walsh	Paul Nicholls
2007	Monet's Garden	9	10-10	Tony Dobbin	Nicky Richards
2008	Knowhere	10	10-05	Paddy Brennan	Nigel Twiston-Davies
2009	Monet's Garden	11	11-10	Barry Geraghty	Nicky Richards
2010	Monet's Garden	12	11-07	Dougie Costello	Nicky Richards
2011	Albertas Run	10	11-00	Tony McCoy	Jonjo O'Neill
2012	For Non Stop	7	10-11	Noel Fehily	Nick Williams
2013	Conquisto	8	11-00	Tony McCoy	Steve Gollings
2014	Wishfull Thinking	11	11-08	Richard Johnson	Philip Hobbs
2015	Sound Investment	7	11-03	Nick Scholfield	Paul Nicholls
2016	Third Intention	9	10-07	Aidan Coleman	Colin Tizzard
2017	Smad Place	10	11-03	Wayne Hutchinson	Alan King
2018	Frodon	6	11-07	Bryony Frost	Paul Nicholls
2019	Forest Bihan	8	10-04	Brian Hughes	Brian Ellison
2020	Nuts Well	9	11-07	Danny McMenamin	Ann Hamilton
2021	Allmankind	5	11-10	Harry Skelton	Dan Skelton
2022	Riders Onthe Storm	9	10-06	Brian Hughes	Richard Hobson
2023	Jetoile	8	11-00	Daryl Jacob	Ryan Potter
2024	Minella Drama	9	10-06	Brian Hughes	Donald McCain
2025	Hitman	9	11-03	Freddie Gingell	Paul Nicholls
2026	cancelled due to high winds

== See also ==
- Horse racing in Great Britain
- List of British National Hunt races
