= Silviniaco Conti Chase =

Steeplechase horse race in Britain

Silviniaco Conti Chase
2026
Edwardstone	Master Chewy	Boombawn

Previous years
2024
Banbridge	Pic D'Orhy	Janidil
2023
Pic D'Orhy	Clondaw Castle	Paint The Dream
2022
Mister Fisher	Eldorado Allen	Rouge Vif
2021
Master Tommytucker	Clondaw Castle	Riders Onthe Storm

2020-2014
2020
Frodon	Keeper Hill	Top Notch
2019
Top Notch	Black Corton	Charbel
2018
Waiting Patiently	Art Mauresque	God's Own
2017
Vaniteux	Vibrato Valtat	Only two finished
2016
Triolo D'Alene	Wishfull Thinking	Only two finished
2015
Balder Succes	Fox Appeal	Hunt Ball
2014
Captain Chris	Champion Court	Twinlight

The Silviniaco Conti Chase is a Grade 2 National Hunt steeplechase in Great Britain which is open to horses aged five years or older. It is run at Kempton Park over a distance of about 2 miles and 4½ furlongs (2 miles, 4 furlongs and 110 yards, or 4,124 metres), and during its running there are sixteen fences to be jumped. The race is scheduled to take place each year in January.

The event is named after the racehorse Silviniaco Conti, a dual winner of Kempton Park's most prestigious race, the King George VI Chase. Prior to the 2019–20 season it was run as a Listed race under a sponsored title; the race was renamed and raised to Grade 2 status by the British Horseracing Authority from the 2020 running.

== Winners since 2014 ==
Year	Winner	Age	Jockey	Trainer
2014	Captain Chris	10	Richard Johnson	Philip Hobbs
2015	Balder Success	7	Wayne Hutchinson	Alan King
2016	Triolo d'Alene	9	Jeremiah McGrath	Nicky Henderson
2017	Vaniteux	8	Paul Moloney	Nicky Henderson
2018	Waiting Patiently	7	Brian Hughes	Malcolm Jefferson
2019	Top Notch	8	Daryl Jacob	Nicky Henderson
2020	Frodon	8	Bryony Frost	Paul Nicholls
2021	Master Tommytucker	10	Harry Cobden	Paul Nicholls
2022	Mister Fisher	8	James Bowen	Nicky Henderson
2023	Pic D'Orhy	8	Harry Cobden	Paul Nicholls
2024	Banbridge	8	JJ Slevin	Joseph O'Brien
2025	Abandoned due to frost
2026	Edwardstone	12	Tom Cannon	Alan King

== See also ==
- Horse racing in Great Britain
- List of British National Hunt races
