= Albertas Run =

Irish-bred Thoroughbred racehorse

- Sire: Accordion
- Grandsire: Sadler's Wells
- Dam: Holly Grove Lass
- Damsire: Le Moss
- Sex: Gelding
- Foaled: 23 April 2001
- Country: Ireland
- Colour: Bay
- Breeder: Oliver and Salome Brennan
- Owner: Trevor Hemmings
- Trainer: Jonjo O'Neill
- Record: 36:15-5-5
- Earnings: £908,584

Major wins
- European Breeders' Fund Novices' Handicap Hurdle Final (2007); John Smith's Extra Cold Handicap Hurdle (2007); Reynoldstown Novices' Chase (2008); Royal and SunAlliance Chase (2008); Amlin 1965 Chase (2009); Ryanair Chase (2010, 2011); Melling Chase (2010); Old Roan Chase (2011)

Albertas Run (foaled 23 April 2001) was an Irish-bred, British-trained Thoroughbred racehorse who competed in National Hunt races. He won two National Hunt Flat races and became a successful hurdler, winning the National Hunt Novices' Handicap Hurdle Final and the John Smith's Extra Cold Handicap Hurdle in 2007. He became more successful as a Steeplechaser, winning four Grade I races: the Royal and SunAlliance Chase, the Melling Chase and two runnings of the Ryanair Chase. His other wins included the Reynoldstown Novices' Chase, the Amlin 1965 Chase and the Old Roan Chase.

== Background ==
Albertas Run is a dark-coated bay gelding with two white feet bred in Ireland by Oliver and Salome Brennan. He was sired by Accordion a son of Sadler's Wells who became a very successful National Hunt stallion, siring Flagship Uberalles, Dato Star (Christmas Hurdle) and Accordion Etoile (Ryanair Novice Chase).

In 2004, the three-year-old gelding was sent to the Tattersalls Ireland sales where he has sold for €20,000 to representatives of Highflyer Bloodstock. Albertas Run was sent into training with Jonjo O'Neill at his Jackdaws Castle stable at Temple Guiting, near Cheltenham in Gloucestershire.

== Racing career ==
=== 2005/2006 National Hunt season ===
Albertas Run began his racing career by competing in National Hunt Flat races. He made a successful debut at Haydock Park Racecourse in November, defeating fifteen opponents at odds of 5/1. He returned to the Lancashire course in January and won a similar event and took the lead inside the final furlong before winning by a head from Jobsworth and five others. He was then moved up sharply in class to contest the Grade I Champion Bumper at the Cheltenham Festival in March. Starting a 40/1 outsider, he was among the leaders in the early stages, but then dropped back and finished fifteenth of the twenty-three runners, more than seventeen lengths behind the Irish-trained winner Hairy Molly.

=== 2006/2007 National Hunt season ===
In the 2006/7 National Hunt season Albertas Run competed as a Novice Hurdler, winning on his debut over obstacles at Uttoxeter Racecourse in October. He then started 4/6 favourite for a Handicap at Haydock Park but finished fourth behind more experienced opponents. In January, the gelding carried 158 pounds in a handicap at Huntingdon Racecourse and won by three and a half lengths Hot Lips Page and ten others. Albertas Run's win at Uttoxeter qualified him for the final race of EBF Sunderlands National Hunt Novices' Handicap Hurdle series, a Grade III race run over two and a half miles at Sandown Park Racecourse on 10 March. Carrying 149 pounds and starting the 6/1 second favourite, he took the lead two hurdles from the finish and won by four lengths from Double Eagle. On his final appearance of the season, Albertas Run was moved up in distance and matched against more experienced horses in the John Smith's Extra Cold Handicap Hurdle (now a Grade III race) over three miles at Aintree Racecourse. The gelding took the lead between the last two hurdles and held on to win by half a length from Lyes Green.

=== 2007/2008 National Hunt season ===
Albertas Run began competing in steeplechases in the autumn of 2007, beginning with a nine length win when 2/5 favourite for a Novices' event at Towcester Racecourse in October. Later in the month he proved no match for Tidal Bay over two and a half miles at Aintree, being beaten twenty-two lengths into second place. He was moved up to three miles at Cheltenham in November and won "comfortably" from the Irish-trained Sizing Australia.

On 16 February, Albertas Run was moved up in class to contest the Grade II Reynoldstown Novices' Chase over three miles at Ascot Racecourse and started third favourite at odds of 9/2 behind Air Force One and Joe Lively. Ridden by Ruby Walsh, he was restrained in last place before moving through the field to take the lead at the last fence and hon by one and three quarter lengths from Air Force One. At the Cheltenham Festival on 13 March, Albertas Run, ridden by A. P. McCoy started 4/1 favourite for the Grade I Royal and SunAlliance Chase. He was held up by McCoy in the early stages before moving to track the leaders four fences from the finish. He took the lead approaching the final fence and drew clear of the field in the closing stages to win "comfortably" by four and a half lengths from Roll Along. At Aintree a month later, Albertas Run was matched against the French import Big Buck's in the Mildmay Novices' Chase. He started the 6/4 favourite but was beaten eleven and three quarter lengths into third place by Big Buck's and Battlecry.

=== 2008/2009 National Hunt season ===
Albertas run failed to win in six races in the 2008/2009 National Hunt season but produced several good efforts in top-class steeplechases. In November he finished a distant fourth behind Tiday Bay in a race at Carlisle and was then pulled up when tailed off behind Madison du Berlais in the Hennessy Gold Cup at Newbury Racecourse. On 26 December, Albertas Run started a 25/1 outsider for the Grade I King George VI Chase at Kempton Park Racecourse. He was never able to challenge the winner Kauto Star, but took second place by half a length from Voy Por Ustedes, with the future Cheltenham Gold Cup winner Imperial Commander more than sixty lengths further back in sixth. In February, Albertas Run finished a distant third behind Madison du Berlais and Denman in the Grade II Levy Board Chase at Kempton. The gelding started at odds of 14/1 for the Gold Cup at Cheltenham and finished ninth of the sixteenth runners in an exceptionally strong renewal which saw Kauto Star win from Denman, Exotic Dancer and Neptune Collonges. In April he finished third to Madison du Berlais and Exotic Dancer in the Totesport Bowl at Aintree, but was pulled up behind Notre Pere in the Punchestown Gold Cup on his final appearance of the season.

=== 2009/2010 National Hunt season ===
On his first appearance of the next National Hunt season, Albertas Run was brought back in distance for the Grade II Amlin 1965 Chase over two miles three furlongs at Ascot. Ridden by McCoy he took the lead at the seventh fence and stayed on strongly to win by three and a half lengths from Planet of Sound, with Voy Por Ustedes in third and Monet's Garden in sixth. He then started second favourite for the Peterborough Chase at Huntingdon Racecourse but finished third, ahead of Tidal Bay, but eleven lengths behind the winner Deep Purple. Albertas Run's second attempt at the King George VI Chase was less successful than his first, as he finished sixth of the thirteen runners, almost seventy lengths behind Kauto Star.

Albertas Run showed rather better form at Ascot on 20 February when he finished second to Monet's Garden in the Grade I Ascot Chase, one and a half lengths behind the winner. At the Cheltenham Festival started at odd of 14/1 for the Grade I Ryanair Chase over two and a half miles against a field which included Deep Purple, Planet of Sound, Voy Por Ustedes and Poquelin. Ridden by McCoy, he tracked the leaders before moving up to dispute the lead with Deep Purple before establishing a clear advantage at the fourth last fence. He went clear of the field approaching the second last fence and won by four and a half lengths from Poquelin. On 9 April McCoy rode Albertas Run in the Grade I Melling Chase over two and a half miles at Aintree. The gelding started at odds of 8/1 against ten opponents including Poquelin, Deep Purple, Monet's Garden and Forpadydeplasterer. Albertas Run tracked Monet's Garden before taking the lead four fences from the finish. He stayed on well in the closing stages to win by three and a quarter lengths from Forpadydeplasterer, with Monet's Garden in third. After the race, O'Neill praised the horse's performance saying "He had a hard race at Cheltenham... I thought we'd stay as long as he kept jumping. It worked out well. We are delighted, thrilled to bits with him"

=== 2010/2011 National Hunt season ===
Albertas Run showed little worthwhile form in the first half of the 2010/2011 National Hunt season. He finished a remote fourth to Monet's Garden in the Old Roan Chase at Aintree in October and the fell for the first time in his racing career at the third last fence in the Amlin 1965 Chase. In the King George VI Chase, delayed until 15 January 2011, he was pulled up after dropping out of contention in a race won by Long Run.

Despite his unimpressive form, Albertas Run was made 6/1 second favourite when he attempted to win the Ryanair Chase for the second time on 17 March at Cheltenham. His opponents included Kalahari King, Poquelin, Voy Por Ustedes and Breedsbreeze. Albertas Run was among the leaders from the start before taking a clear advantage at the third-last fence and staying on strongly in the closing stages in the closing stages to win by a length from Kalahari King. At Aintree in April, Albertas Run was matched against the outstanding two-mile chaser Master Minded in the Melling Chase. He tracked the leaders in the early stages before moving up to challenge Master Minded, but was no match for the French-bred gelding and finished second, beaten nine lengths.

=== 2011/2012 National Hunt season ===
On his first appearance of the 2011/2012 season Albertas Run met Master Minded again in the Old Roan Chase on 22 October. Albertas Run led from the start and having been "shaken up" by McCoy approaching the third last fence, won by a length from Pure Faith, with Master Minded seven lengths back in third. The gelding did not reappear until March, when he attempted to win the Ryanair Chase for the third time. Starting at odds of 10/1, he disputed the lead from the start and went to the front three fences out but was overtaken fifty yards from the finish and beaten half a length by Riverside Theatre. In the Melling Chase at Aintree he made several jumping errors and after briefly taking the lead, was outpaced in the closing stages and finished third behind Finian's Rainbow and Wishfull Thinking.

Eleven months after his last appearance, Albertas Run returned to Cheltenham and ran in the Ryanair Chase for the fourth time. He was close behind the leaders in the early stages but dropped out of contention and was pulled up in a race won by Cue Card.

Albertas Run retirement was announced on 29 March 2013. It was announced that he would spend his retirement at Trevor Hemmings' Ballaseyr Stud on the Isle Of Man. O'Neill said "Horses as good as him do not come along on a regular basis and he will be a desperately hard act to replace in the yard as he was a flagbearer for many years and ran his heart out for you every time".

== Pedigree ==
Pedigree of Albertas Run, bay gelding, 2001
Sire Accordion (IRE) 1986	Sadler's Wells (USA); 1981	Northern Dancer	Nearctic
Sire Accordion (IRE) 1986	Sadler's Wells (USA); 1981	Northern Dancer	Natalma
Sire Accordion (IRE) 1986	Sadler's Wells (USA); 1981	Fairy Bridge	Bold Reason
Sire Accordion (IRE) 1986	Sadler's Wells (USA); 1981	Fairy Bridge	Special
Sire Accordion (IRE) 1986	Sound of Success (USA); 1969	Successor	Bold Ruler
Sire Accordion (IRE) 1986	Sound of Success (USA); 1969	Successor	Misty Morn
Sire Accordion (IRE) 1986	Sound of Success (USA); 1969	Belle Musique	Tudor Minstrel
Sire Accordion (IRE) 1986	Sound of Success (USA); 1969	Belle Musique	Bellesoeur
Dam Holly Grove Lass (GB) 1986	Le Moss (IRE); 1975	Le Levanstell	Le Lavandou
Dam Holly Grove Lass (GB) 1986	Le Moss (IRE); 1975	Le Levanstell	Stellas Sister
Dam Holly Grove Lass (GB) 1986	Le Moss (IRE); 1975	Feemoss	Ballymoss
Dam Holly Grove Lass (GB) 1986	Le Moss (IRE); 1975	Feemoss	Feevagh
Dam Holly Grove Lass (GB) 1986	Girseach (IRE); 1980	Furry Glen	Wolver Hollow
Dam Holly Grove Lass (GB) 1986	Girseach (IRE); 1980	Furry Glen	Cleftess
Dam Holly Grove Lass (GB) 1986	Girseach (IRE); 1980	Happy Lass	Tarqogan
Dam Holly Grove Lass (GB) 1986	Girseach (IRE); 1980	Happy Lass	Never On Time (Family 14-c)
