= Victor Ludorum Juvenile Hurdle =

Hurdle horse race in Britain

Victor Ludorum Juvenile Hurdle
2026
Manlaga	Pourquoi Pas Papa	The Mighty Celt

Previous years
2025
Gibbs Island	Give It To Me Oj	Lavender Hill Mob
2024
Salver	Castelfort	Dameofthecotswolds
2023
Bo Zenith	Cianciana	Punta Del Este
2022
Porticello	Skycutter	Tanganyika
2021
Monmiral	Nassalam	Elham Valley

2020-2011
2020
Sir Psycho	Rockadenn	The Pink'n
2019
Quel Destin	Capone	Fanzio
2018
Turning Gold	Cornerstone Lad	Lisp
2017
Don Bersy	Zalvados	Most Celebrated
2016
Frodon	Fixe Le Kap	Messire Des Obeaux
2015
Top Notch	Medicine Hat	Scrafton
2014
Abracadabra Sivola	Aurore D'estruval	The Green Ogre
2013
Only Orsenfoolsies	Zamdy Man	Valco De Touzaine
2012
Une Artiste	High Samana	Lexi's Boy
2011
Houblon Des Obeaux	Third Intention	Kumbeshwar
2010
Me Voici	Diktalina	Sergeant Pink

2010-2001
2009
Stow	Indian Groom	Blues in Cee
2008
Serabad	Pagan Starprincess	Harry Tricker
2007
Grand Bleu	King's Revenge	Archimboldo
2006
Overlut	Bold Fire	Onnix
2005
Akilak	Karelian	Protective
2004
King Revo	My Will	Albany
2003
Far Pavilions	Crystal d'Ainay	Mirant
2001
Among Equals	Deferlant	Montreal

2000-1991
2000
Mrs Jodi	Ifni Du Luc	Zahari
1999
Simply Gifted	Rajati	Navarre Samson
1998
Sad Mad Bad	Kingdom Emperor	Kilbride Lad
1997
No More Hassle	Globe Runner	Font Romeu
1996
Marchant Ming	Dally Boy	Solatium
1995
Muntafi	Zaitoon	Inculcate
1993
Bold Boss	Glaisdale	Stylus
1992
Snowy Lane	Cooley's Valve	Good Profile
1991
Reve De Valse	All Welcome	Bottles

1990-1988
1990
Ninja	Vestris Abu	Native Friend
1989
Liadett	Peanuts Pet	Mils Mij
1988
Royal Illusion	Gilt Bronze	Favourite Guest

The Victor Ludorum Juvenile Hurdle is a National Hunt hurdle race in England which is open to horses aged four years only. It is run at Haydock Park over a distance of about 1 mile 7½ furlongs (1 mile, 7 furlongs and 144 yards, or 3,149 metres), and during its running there are 9 flights of hurdles to be jumped. It is scheduled to take place each year in February.

The race was first run in 1962 and was classified as a Listed race in the 1980s. It was run as a Limited handicap from 1995 to 2001.

== Winners ==
Year	Winner	Jockey	Trainer
1962	Pillock's Green	Bobby Beasley	Fred Rimell
1963	Abandoned because of frost
1964	Makaldar	David Mould	Peter Cazalet
1965	Anselmo	Tommy Carberry	Keith Piggott
1966	Harwell	Bobby Beasley	A Thomas
1967	Persian War	Jimmy Uttley	Brian Swift
1968	Wing Master	Roddy Reid	J Bower
1969	Coral Diver	Terry Biddlecombe	Fred Rimell
1970	Abandoned because of snow and frost
1971	Neiak	Steve A Taylor	Steve Norton
1972	North Pole	Ken White	Fred Rimell
1973	Mythical King	Doug Barrott	Josh Gifford
1974	Relevant	Gerard Griffin	Roy Edwards
1975	Zip Fastener	Jeff King	Fred Rimell
1976	Sweet Joe	Ian Watkinson	Harry Thomson Jones
1977	Rathconrath	John Francome	Fred Winter
1978	Mixed Melody	David Goulding	Gordon W. Richards
1979	Exalted	J P Harty	Jim Bolger (Ir)
1980	Jubilee Saint	David Goulding	Miss Sally Hall
1981	Abandoned because of waterlogged state of course
1982	Azaam	David Goulding	Roger Fisher
1983	Wollow Will	John Francome	Fred Winter
1984	Childown	Steve Smith Eccles	Nicky Henderson
1985	Wing and a Prayer	John Francome	John Jenkins
1986	Abandoned because of frost
1987	Cashew King	Trevor Wall	Bryan McMahon
1988	Royal Illusion	Micky Hammond	George Moore
1989	Liadett	Jonothon Lower	Martin Pipe
1990	Ninja	Richard Dunwoody	David Nicholson
1991	Reve de Valse	Gary Moore	Denys Smith
1992	Snowy Lane	Peter Scudamore	Martin Pipe
1993	Bold Boss	Mark Dwyer	George Moore
1994	Abandoned due to frost and snow
1995	Muntafi	Mark Perrett	Guy Harwood
1996	Marchant Ming	Russ Garritty	Micky Hammond
1997	No More Hassle	Peter Niven	Mary Reveley
1998	Sad Mad Bad	Peter Niven	Mary Reveley
1999	Simply Gifted	Lorcan Wyer	Tim Easterby
2000	Mrs Jodi	Graham Lee	Malcolm Jefferson
2001	Among Equals	Andrew Thornton	Martyn Meade
2002	Abandoned due to waterlogged state of the course
2003	Far Pavilions	Jim Crowley	Alan Swinbank
2004	King Revo	J P McNamara	Patrick Haslam
2005	Akilak	Tony Dobbin	J Howard Johnson
2006	Overlut	Dean Gallagher	Francois Cottin
2007	Grand Bleu	Jacques Ricou	François Doumen
2008	Serabad	Paddy Brennan	Peter Bowen
2009	Stow	Sam Thomas	Venetia Williams
2010	Me Voici	Daryl Jacob	Nick Williams
2011	Houblon Des Obeaux	Aidan Coleman	Venetia Williams
2012	Une Artiste	David Bass	Nicky Henderson
2013	Only Orsenfoolsies	Wilson Renwick	Micky Hammond
2014	Abracadabra Sivola	Sam Twiston-Davies	Nick Williams
2015	Top Notch	Daryl Jacob	Nicky Henderson
2016	Frodon	Sean Bowen	Paul Nicholls
2017	Don Bersy	James Davies	Tom Symonds
2018	Turning Gold	Sam Twiston-Davies	Nigel Twiston-Davies
2019	Quel Destin	Sean Bowen	Paul Nicholls
2020	Sir Psycho	Bryony Frost	Paul Nicholls
2021	Monmiral	Sean Bowen	Paul Nicholls
2022	Porticello	Joshua Moore	Gary Moore
2023	Bo Zenith	Tom Cannon	Gary Moore
2024	Salver	Caoilin Quinn	Gary Moore
2025	Gibbs Island	Stan Sheppard	Tom Lacey
2026	Manlaga	Brian Hughes	Nicky Henderson

== See also ==
- Horseracing
- List of British National Hunt races
