= Klairon Davis Novice Chase =

Steeplechase horse race in Ireland

Klairon Davis Novice Chase
2021
Riviere D'etel	Take All	Jacksons Gold

Previous years
2020
Andy Dufresne	Embittered	Cavalry Master
2019
Tornado Flyer	I'm A Game Changer	Eclair De Beaufeu
2018
Hardline	Us And Them	Or Jaune De Somoza
2017
Tombstone	Jett	Inis Meain
2016
Attribution	Briar Hill	Three Stars
2015
Ttebbob	Lord Scoundrel	Shadow Catcher

The Klairon Davis Novice Chase is a Grade 3 National Hunt novice steeplechase in Ireland which is open to horses aged four years or older. It is run at Navan over a distance of 2 miles and 1 furlong (3,419 metres) and during its running there are 12 fences to be jumped. The race is scheduled to take place each year in December.

The race was first run in 2015. It is named in honour of Klairon Davis, winner of the Queen Mother Champion Chase in 1996.

== Records ==
Leading jockey :

- no jockey has won this race more than once

Leading trainer (4 wins):

- Gordon Elliott- Tombstone (2017), Hardline (2018), Andy Dufresne (2020), Riviere D'etel (2021)

== Winners ==
Year	Winner	Age	Jockey	Trainer
2015	Ttebbob	6	Robbie Power	Jessica Harrington
2016	Attribution	6	Bryan Cooper	Henry de Bromhead
2017	Tombstone	7	Jack Kennedy	Gordon Elliott
2018	Hardline	6	Davy Russell	Gordon Elliott
2019	Tornado Flyer	6	Danny Mullins	Willie Mullins
2020	Andy Dufresne	6	Mark Walsh	Gordon Elliott
2021	Riviere D'etel	4	Denis O'Regan	Gordon Elliott
(Note: The 2023 running was abandoned due to a frozen course)	no race 2022

== See also ==
- Horse racing in Ireland
- List of Irish National Hunt races
