= Victor ludorum =

Trophy presented to the most successful team, club, or competitor at a sports event

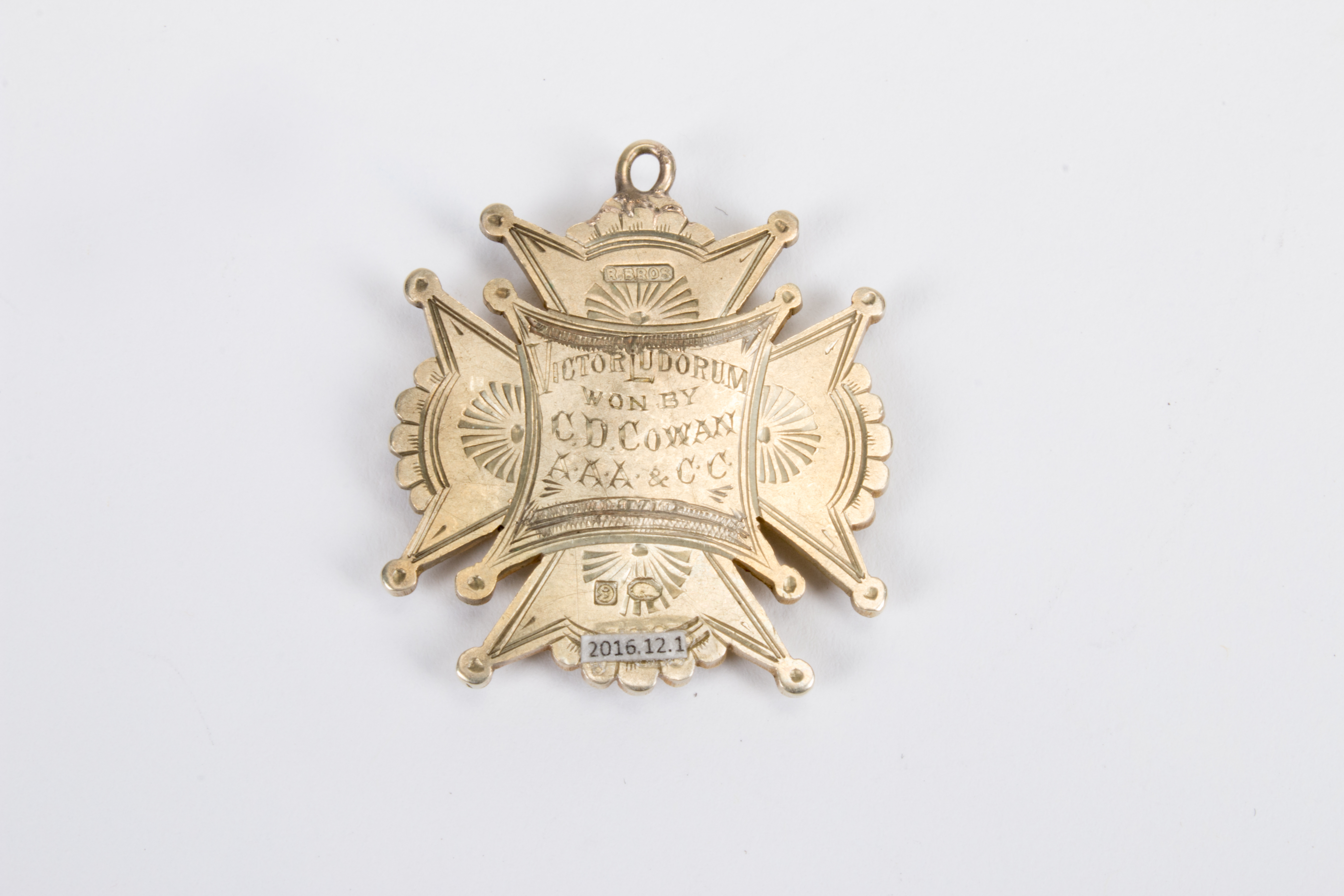
Medal inscribed with Victor Ludorum

Victor ludorum (or victrix ludorum) is Latin for "the winner of the games". It is usually a trophy presented to the most successful team, club, or competitor at a sports event. It is common at rowing regattas and was traditional at some British state and public school sports days. It is usually presented to the athlete/competitor who has won the most events or who has accumulated the most points through competing in many events.

Female competitors usually compete for the victrix ludorum.

The practice of awarding a trophy to the victor (victrix) ludorum was still followed, as of 2018, in schools and colleges established by descendants of British settlers in South Africa.

== See also ==
- Victor Ludorum Juvenile Hurdle
