= Klairon Davis =

French-bred Thoroughbred racehorse

- Sire: Rose Laurel
- Grandsire: Klairon
- Dam: Styrene
- Damsire: Trenel
- Sex: Gelding
- Foaled: 4 March 1989
- Country: France
- Colour: Brown
- Breeder: Claude Quellier
- Owner: Chris Jones
- Trainer: Arthur Moore
- Record: 54: 20-9-7
- Earnings: £366,343

Major wins
- Jameson Gold Cup Hurdle (1994); Punchestown Champion Novice Hurdle (1994); Dennys Gold Medal Chase (1994); Arkle Novice Chase (1995); Arkle Challenge Trophy (1995); Tipperary Racecourse Chase (1995); Queen Mother Champion Chase (1996); BMW Handicap Chase (1996, 1997); Normans Grove Chase (1998, 1999, 2001)

Klairon Davis (4 March 1989 – 27 March 2018) was a French-bred, Irish-trained Thoroughbred racehorse who competed under National Hunt rules. In a racing career which lasted from April 1993 and May 2001, he won twenty of his fifty-four races and was placed on sixteen occasions. After beginning in National Hunt Flat races he competed over hurdles winning the Punchestown Champion Novice Hurdle in 1994. In the following season he raced in novice chases and recorded major wins in the Dennys Gold Medal Chase, Arkle Novice Chase and Arkle Challenge Trophy. In 1996 he had his biggest success when taking the Queen Mother Champion Chase and followed up in the BMW Handicap Chase. He was never as good again, but won a second BMW Chase in 1997 and took the Normans Grove Chase in 1998, 1999 and 2001 before retiring at the age of twelve. During his career he had sustained rivalries with the leading Irish jumpers Sound Man and Merry Gale.

== Background ==
Klairon Davis was a brown gelding with a white star and snip bred in France by Claude Quellier. His sire, Rose Laurel won the Prix Daru and the Prix Eugène Adam in 1973, when he was rated 121 by Timeform. Rose Laurel was a representative of the Byerley Turk sire line, unlike more than 95% of modern thoroughbreds, who descend directly from the Darley Arabian. Klairon Davis's dam Styrene also produced Trumpet Davis, the dam of the Warfield Mares' Hurdle winner Violin Davis.

Klairon Davis was acquired as a yearling by Chris Jones and sent into training with Arthur Moore at Naas in County Kildare. Moore, the son of Dan Moore who trained L'Escargot, had established himself as a leading trainer in his own right in the 1980s with horses such as Royal Bond and Drumgora. During his racing career, Klairon Davis usually raced in a sheepskin noseband.

== Racing career ==
=== 1992/1993 season: National Hunt Flat races ===
Klairon Davis began his racing career at Punchestown Racecourse on 27 April 1993 when he contested the two-mile Tom O'Leary Memorial INH Flat Race. Ridden by the amateur jockey Humphrey Murphy, he started at odds of 12/1 and finished sixth of the thirty runners, nine lengths behind the winner Dunferne Classic.

=== 1993/1994 season: Novice Hurdles ===
Klairon Davis began his undefeated second season in a National Hunt Flat race at Gowran Park on 4 November 1994 in which he was again ridden by Murphy. He started the 6/4 favourite against seven opponents and recorded his first victory, beating the mare Maryjo by eleven lengths. Three weeks later he made his debut over obstacles in a novice hurdle race at Naas Racecourse and won by twelve lengths when ridden by the professional jockey Tom Taaffe, who was riding in his final season. Taaffe was again in the saddle when Klairon Davis added wins in novice hurdles at Navan Racecourse in December and Thurles Racecourse in early January. At the end of January, Murphy partnered the gelding to a fifth successive win at Naas, beating Court Melody by three lengths.

Klairon Davies missed the 1994 Cheltenham Festival and returned on 4 April at Fairyhouse Racecourse when he was moved up in class for the Grade 2 Jameson Gold Cup Hurdle. In this race he was matched for the first time against the Edward O'Grady-trained gelding Sound Man and the pair started joint-favourites at odds of 2/1. Ridden for the first time by Tom Horgan, Klairon Davis was restrained in the early stages before taking the lead approaching the last fence and defeated Sound Man by a length and a half. Three weeks later Klairon Davis was stepped up in class again and for the Group 1 Champion Novice Hurdle at Punchestown and started 7/4 favourite ahead of Winter Belle, Sound Man and Monalee River. Horgan sent the gelding into the lead at the final hurdle and won his seventh consecutive race by a length from the Jim Bolger-trained outsider Riszard.

=== 1994/1995 season: Novice Chases ===
In the 1994/1995 season was switched to compete over larger obstacles when he began to compete in novice steeplechases. His seven-race winning sequence came to an end on 27 October his debut over fences when he fell in a race at Tipperary Racecourse won by the Aidan O'Brien-trained seven-year-old Idiot's Venture. Francis "Frannie" Woods took over the ride at Navan eleven days later and Klairon Davis recorded his first chase win, beating Calmos by three lengths at odds of 8/11. On 26 November he started 6/4 favourite over Idiot's Delight in a novice chase at Punchestown but was beaten two lengths into second place by his older rival. On his final appearance of 1995, Klairon Davis faced Idiot's Delight, Sound Man and Winter Belle in the Group 1 Dennys Gold Medal Chase over two miles one furlong at Leopardstown Racecourse on 26 December. He was in third place behind Sound Man and Winter Belle when Idiot's Delight fell at the second last. Klairon Davis stayed on strongly on the run-in to take the lead in the final strides and won by a head and a length from Winter Belle and Sound Man.

In the Arkle Novice Chase at Fairyhouse on 29 January, Klairon Davis won again, beating Winter Belle by ten lengths with the favourite Idiot's Delight being pulled up injured three fences out. For his next race, the gelding was sent to the Cheltenham Festival for the first time to contest the Arkle Challenge Trophy over two miles. He started the 7/2 favourite ahead of the Dipper Novices' Chase winner Morceli, with Sound Man the co-third choice in the betting alongside the Henry VIII Novices' Chase winner Sound Reveille and Dancing Paddy. Sound Reveille took the early lead from Morceli, with Klairon Davis racing at the back of the field on the wide outside. At the seventh fence Sound Reveille made a very bad jumping error, handing the advantage to Morceli and Klairon Davis made progress into fourth place. Sound Man overtook Morceli at the third last, but Klairon Davis continued his forward move and gained the advantage at the next fence. Klairon Davis and Sound Man raced side by side over the last obstacle and along the run-in, with the favourite prevailing by half a length despite Woods dropping his whip in the closing stages.

At Punchestown on 27 April, Klairon Davis met Sound Man yet again in the Bank of Ireland Novice Chase, but also faced a new rival in the Paddy Burke-trained Strong Platinum who had won the BMW Chase two days earlier. After racing in third for most of the way, Klairon Davis, the 6/4 favourite, made a forward move approaching the last, but could make no further progress on the run-in and finished third behind Strong Platinum and Sound Man. Three weeks after his defeat at Punchestown, the gelding was sent to France to contest a hurdle race over 4100 metres at Auteuil Hippodrome, but ran last of the four finishers behind the locally trained Poplife.

=== 1995/1996 season: Steeplechases ===
On his first appearance against more experienced chasers, Klairon Davis contested a Grade 3 race at Tipperary on 16 November in which he was matched at level weights against Merry Gale, the winner of the Punchestown Chase, Powers Gold Cup and Martell Cup. Starting the 9/10 favourite, he tracked Merry Gale before taking the lead at the second last and won by six lengths. Commenting on the possibility of a clash with the reigning two-mile champion chaser Viking Flagship, Moore said "Klairon Davis did that well, but he will be having a light programme because there are not many suitable races over this trip in this country. Next spring will be time enough to take on Viking Flagship". The gelding was then tried over longer distances and failed to complete the course in his next two races, falling at the fifth in the John Durkan Memorial Punchestown Chase on 25 November and unseating Woods at the fourth at Leopardstown on 13 January. Later in January he was dropped back in distance for a two-mile handicap chase at Paunchestown and was beaten a neck by Brockley Court, to whom he was conceding twenty pounds.

Klairon Davis was again sent to the Cheltenham Festival where he was one of seven horses to contest the 38th running of the Queen Mother Champion Chase on 13 March. His opponents were Viking Flagship the winner of the race for the last two years, Travado (runner-up in 1994 and winner of the 1993 Arkle Challenge Trophy), Sound Man, Strong Platinum, Dancing Paddy and Coulton (Aintree Chase). Sound Man, who had won the Tingle Creek Trophy in December and the Comet Chase in February was made the 11/8 favourite ahead of Viking Flagship and Strong Platinum with Klairon Davis fourth choice in the betting at 9/1, Dancing Paddy made the early running from Sound Man and Viking Flagship with Klairon Davis held up by Woods in fifth. Sound Man took over the lead at the sixth and led from Viking Flagship with Klairon Davis moving up into third. After mistakes at the fourth and third last fences Klairon Davis turned into the straight in third behind Sound Man and Viking Flagship who looked poised to dispute the finish. Francis Woods, however, moved Klairon Davis steadily forward on the outside and jumped past the two leaders at the final fence before drawing away to win by five lengths. Viking Flagship kept on for second ahead of Sound Man, Travado and Strong Platinum. After the race Moore said "After his last race at Punchestown he could hardly walk into his box. He was on three legs. I never thought he would even run at Cheltenham, never mind win" whilst Woods commented "Klairon Davis is a spring horse and the forgotten horse... He is as tough as anything and it was pure class up the hill". Chris Jones' wife Jill received the trophy from the 95-year-old Queen Mother. Afterwards, connections returned to Ireland to celebrate in Murray's Pub in Dunshaughlin.

The gelding was again tried over longer distances in the Melling Chase at Aintree Racecourse sixteen days later, but after pulling hard in the early stages he finished last of the four runners behind Viking Flagship, Sound Man and Coulton, beaten more than twenty lengths by the winner. On his final appearance of the season, Klairon Davis carried top weight of 168 pounds in the BMW Handicap Chase over two miles at Punchestown on 23 April. His opponents were Sound Man (with whom he started the 5/2 joint-favourite), Strong Platinum, Coulton, Sound Reveille, Brockley Court, the mare Opera Hat and the 1994 Arkle Challenge Trophy winner Nakir. After disputing the lead with Sound Man, he took a clear advantage at the third last fence and soon went clear, winning by ten lengths from Sound Man, with Opera Hat half a lengths away in third place.

=== 1996/1997 season: Steeplechases ===
On his first appearance of the 1996/1997 season Klairon Davis was beaten half a length by Fiftysevenchannels in a handicap chase at Leopardstown on 10 November when he conceded twenty-one pounds to the winner. On 7 December he started 5/2 second favourite for the Punchestown Chase but fell four fences from the finish. Three weeks later in handicap chase at Leopardstown he was beaten into second place by Merry Gale, to whom he was conceding fifteen pounds. Klairon Davis returned to winning form in handicap chase at Navan in February, beating Idiot's Venture by eight lengths, conceding 21 pounds to the runner-up.

On 12 March 1997, Klairon Davis attempted to repeat his 1996 success in the Queen Mother Champion Chase at Cheltenham and started as the 3/1 joint-second favourite behind the improving six-year-old Strong Promise and alongside Viking Flagship. Racing on firmer ground than in the previous year he was held up in the early staged but appeared outpaced on the final turn and finished fourth of the six runners behind Martha's Son, Ask Tom and Viking Flagship. On his final appearance of the sea on the season, Klairon Davis returned to Ireland for the BMW Chase at Punchestown on 22 April and started 11/10 favourite despite conceding seventeen pounds to his six opponents who included Idiot's Delight, Opera Hat and the British challenger Arctic Kinsman and Big Matt. After being challenged in the early stages by Opera Hat he took the lead and jumped well before drawing away over the last two fences to win the race for the second time, beating Big Matt by eight lengths with Idiot's Venture in third.

=== 1997/1998 season: Steeplechases ===
Klairon Davis began his sixth season in the Dunston Wood Chase at Fairyhouse on 23 October and won by eleven lengths from Fiftysevenchannels. As in all of his races that season he was ridden by Richard Dunwoody. He was sent to England in December and finished fourth to Ask Tom, Viking Flagship and Or Royal when starting 6/4 favourite for the Tingle Creek Trophy. On New Year's Day 1998 he was beaten into second place when attempting to concede seventeen pounds to Merry Gale in a handicap at Fairyhouse. Dunwoody explained that the gelding was unsuited by the heavy ground. At the same course four weeks later, Klairon Davis met Merry Gale again in the Normans Grove Chase, this time conceding fourteen pounds to his rival. Dunwoody tracked Merry Gale and recovered from a mistake at the second last before taking the lead at the final fence and winning by a length, with Fiftysevenchannels fourteen lengths back in third. In March, Klairon Davis ran in the Queen Mother Champion Stakes for the third time. Starting the 100/30 second favourite he finished fourth of the eight runners behind One Man, Or Royal and Lord Dorcet, beaten fourteen lengths by the winner. On his final appearance of the season he fell at the second fence as he attempted to win a third BMW Chase at Punchestown.

=== Later career ===
In the 1998/1999 season Klairon Davis won one of his four races. On his first run of the year he crossed the line in third behind Merry Gale and Hill Society in a very unusual race at Cork Racecourse in November. Merry Gale was disqualified when his jockey took the wrong course and missed out the second last fence. In December he finished unplaced behind Direct Route in the Tingle Creek Trophy at Sandown and then finished second to Papillon, ahead of Merry Gale and Opera Hat in the Paddy Power Dial-A-Bet Chase at Leopardstown. On 30 January the gelding was ridden for the first time by Conor O'Dwyer as he contested his second Normans Grove Chase at Fairyhouse. Starting the 4/6 favourite he led from the start and won in "impressive" style by fourteen lengths from Opera Hat. After the race the gelding developed heart problems and was off the course for nine months.

In the following season Klairon Davis failed to win in eight races despite contesting some lower class races. After finishing second at Dundalk Racecourse he finished fourth in the Fortria Chase at Navan and the Hilly Way Chase at Fairyhouse before running fifth behind Merry Gale in the Paddy Power Dial-A-Bet Chase at Leopardstown. He finished second to Mr Baxter Basics in the Normans Grove Chase in January and then finished unplaced when carrying top weight of 162 pounds in the Grand Annual Chase at the Cheltenham Festival. In his two remaining races that season he finished third to Mr Baxter Basics in a handicap at Fairyhouse in April and third in a similar event at Killarney in May.

Klairon Davis began his final season by running third behind To Your Honour in a race at Naas and then ran third to the same horse in the Hilly Way Chase. In December he finished last of the four runners behind Papillon (who had won the Grand National in April), To Your Honour and Miles Byrne in the Paddy Power Dial-A-Bet Chase. On 28 January at Fairyhouse, Klairon Davis started the 11/2 outsider of the three runners when facing Papillon and Mr Baxter Basics in the Normans Grove Chase. After racing in third in the early stages, O'Dwyer sent the twelve-year-old into the lead at the fifth fence. Although Mr Baxter Basics dropped away after a bad mistake at the third last Papillon maintained his challenge but Klairon Davis prevailed by a length to record his twentieth and final career victory. After the race Moore commented that the veteran "has still got a bit of life in him yet". In his next two races, Klairon Davis finished third to Moscow Flyer in the Newlands Chase at Naas in February and third to Micko's Dream in the Irish Independent Chase at Fairyhouse in April. On his final racecourse appearance, Klairon Davis finished fourth behind Micko's Dream in a handicap at Fairyhouse on 4 May 2001.

== Retirement ==
In October 2001 it was announced that Klairin Davis would not race again and would spend his retirement at Chris Jones's farm in Dunshaughlin, County Meath. Arthur Moore said "We took the decision to retire Klairon Davis as he has done everything and has been a wonderful servant... He is certainly going to be missed around the yard".

Klarion Davis died at the farm on 27 March 2018 at the age of 29: according to Chris Jones (the son of his late owner) the horse "passed away peacefully".

== Pedigree ==
Pedigree of Klairon Davis (FR), bay gelding, 1989
Sire Rose Laurel (IRE) 1970	Klairon (FR); 1952	Clarion	Djebel
Sire Rose Laurel (IRE) 1970	Klairon (FR); 1952	Clarion	Columba
Sire Rose Laurel (IRE) 1970	Klairon (FR); 1952	Kalmia	Kantar
Sire Rose Laurel (IRE) 1970	Klairon (FR); 1952	Kalmia	Sweet Lavender
Sire Rose Laurel (IRE) 1970	Honeysuckle Rose (GB); 1956	Honeyway	Fairway
Sire Rose Laurel (IRE) 1970	Honeysuckle Rose (GB); 1956	Honeyway	Honey Buzzard
Sire Rose Laurel (IRE) 1970	Honeysuckle Rose (GB); 1956	Queen of Hearts	Big Game
Sire Rose Laurel (IRE) 1970	Honeysuckle Rose (GB); 1956	Queen of Hearts	Rock Goddess
Dam Styrene(FR) 1974	Trenel (FR); 1961	Philius	Pharis
Dam Styrene(FR) 1974	Trenel (FR); 1961	Philius	Theano
Dam Styrene(FR) 1974	Trenel (FR); 1961	Xora	Deux-Pour-Cent
Dam Styrene(FR) 1974	Trenel (FR); 1961	Xora	Sikoro
Dam Styrene(FR) 1974	Filles des Meres (FR); 1959	Fine Top	Fine Art
Dam Styrene(FR) 1974	Filles des Meres (FR); 1959	Fine Top	Toupis
Dam Styrene(FR) 1974	Filles des Meres (FR); 1959	Brise de Mer	Tornado
Dam Styrene(FR) 1974	Filles des Meres (FR); 1959	Brise de Mer	Doire (Family:3-e)
