= Badger Beers Handicap Chase =

Steeplechase horse race in Britain

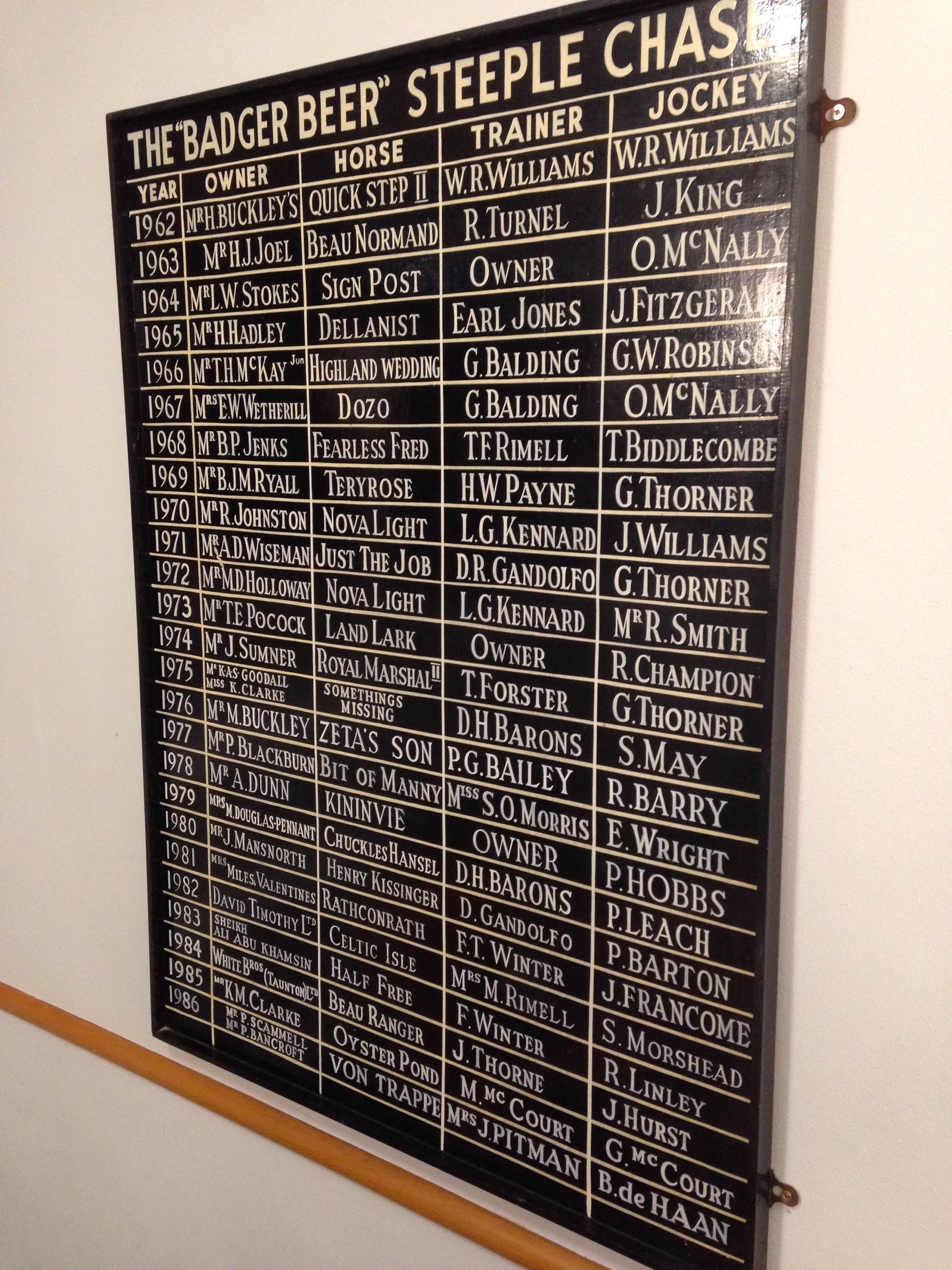
1962–1986

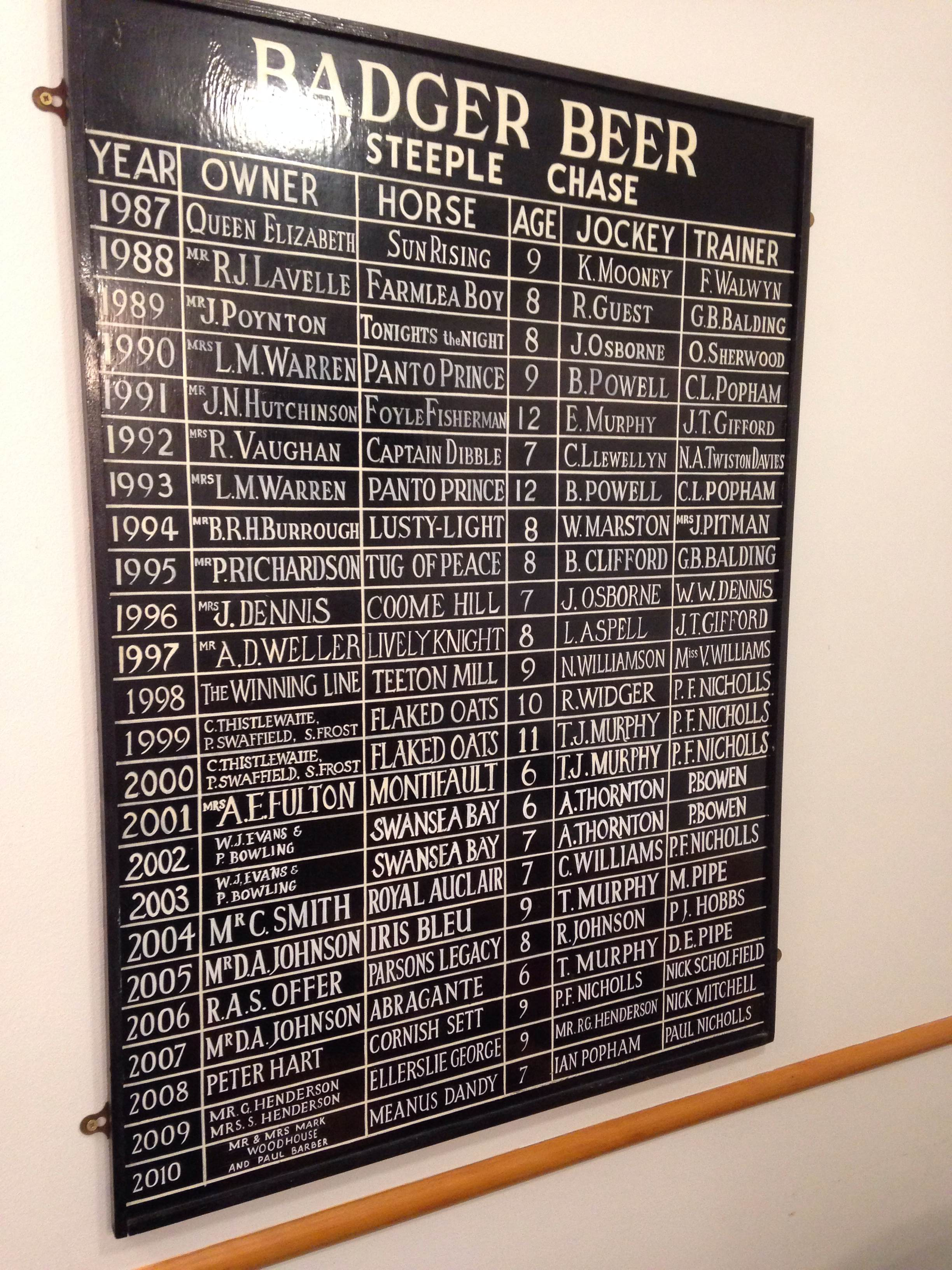
1987–2010

Badger Beer Winners Board

Badger Ales Trophy
2026
Montregard	King Turgeon	Kap Vert

Previous years
2025
Gustavian	Scarface	Credo
2024
Al Dancer	Lord Accord	Gustavian
2023
Blackjack Magic	Threeunderthrufive	Frodon
2022
Frodon	Lord Accord	Cap Du Nord
2021
Rocco	Potterman	Hurricane Harvey

2020-2011
2020
El Presente	Potterman	Kitty's Light
2019
Give Me A Copper	Soupy Soups	Royal Vacation
2018
Present Man	Sumkindofking	Fingerontheswitch
2017
Present Man	Final Nudge	Theatre Guide
2016
Gentleman Jon	Set List	Fingerontheswitch
2015
Drop Out Joe	Royal Palladium	A Good Skin
2014
Court By Surprise	Alfie Spinner	Workbench
2013
Standing Ovation	Alfie Spinner	Court By Surprise
2012
The Package	Michel Le Bon	West End Rocker
2011
The Minack	Meanus Dandy	Benbane Head

2010-2001
2010
Meanus Dandy	Buena Vista	Ellerslie George
2009
Ellerslie George	The Tother One	The Package
2008
Cornish Sett	Island Flyer	Leading Attraction
2007
Abragante	Tom Sayers	Turthen
2006
Parsons Legacy	Preacher Boy	Nil Desperandum
2005
Iris Bleu	Red Devil Robert	Windsor Boy
2004
Royal Auclair	Gunther McBride	Whitenzo
2003
Swansea Bay	Gunther McBride	Chicuelo
2002
Swansea Bay	Gola Cher	Itsonlyme
2001
Montifault	Carbury Cross	Lordberniebouffant

2000-1991
2000
Flaked Oats	King's Road	Windross
1999
Flaked Oats	The Land Agent	Nahthen Lad
1998
Teeton Mill	Menesonic	Jultara
1997
Lively Knight	Glemot	Baronet
1996
Coome Hill	Glemot	Samlee
1995
Tug of Peace	Bas de Laine	Mutual Trust
1994
Lusty Light	Captain Dibble	Another Coral
1993
Panto Prince	Bonsai Bud	Well-known Character
1992
Captain Dibble	Boraceva	Rocktor
1991
Foyle Fisherman	Garrison Savannah	Shalchlo Boy

1990-1988
1990
Panto Prince	Welsh Oak	Only two ran
1989
Tonights The Night	Envopak Token	Shannagary
1988
Farmlea Boy	Aughavogue	Highway Express

The Badger Beers Handicap Chase is a Premier Handicap National Hunt steeplechase in England which is open to horses aged four years or older. It is run at Wincanton over a distance of about 3 miles and 1 furlongs (3 miles, 1 furlong and 30 yards, or 5,029 metres), and during its running there are twenty-one fences to be jumped. It is a limited handicap race, and it is scheduled to take place each year in November.

The race was established in 1963. The first running took place in March 1963, but then moved to an October/November date. It was awarded Listed status in 2003. It was re-classified as a Premier Handicap from the 2022 running when Listed status was removed from handicap races.

The race was run over a distance of 2 miles and 5 furlongs before 1990.

== Winners ==
Year	Winner	Age	Weight	Jockey	Trainer
1963 (Mar)	Quick Step II	9	10-00	Billy Williams	W R Williams
1963 (Nov)	Beau Normand	7	11-07	Jeff King	Bob Turnell
1964	Sign Post	8	10-03	Owen McNally	Mr L W Stokes
1965	Dellanist	6	10-11	Jimmy FitzGerald	Earl Jones
1966	Highland Wedding	9	11-02	Willie Robinson	Toby Balding
1967	Dozo	6	10-10	Owen McNally	Toby Balding
1968	Fearless Fred	6	11-04	Terry Biddlecombe	Fred Rimell
1969	Teryrose	7	10-03	Graham Thorner	Herbert Payne
1970	Nova Light	6	11-03	John Williams	Les Kennard
1971	Just The Job	6	10-00	Graham Thorner	David Gandolfo
1972	Nova Light	8	11-08	Richard Smith (Note: amateur rider)	Les Kennard
1973	Land Lark	8	10-04	Bob Champion	Pat Pocock
1974	Royal Marshal II	7	11-06	Graham Thorner	Tim Forster
1975	Somethings Missing	7	10-00	Sandy May	David Barons
1976	Zeta's Son	7	11-07	Ron Barry	Peter Bailey
1977	Bit of Manny	8	10-00	Eddie Wright	Miss Sue O Morris
1978	Kininvie	9	10-00	Philip Hobbs	Allan Dunn
1979	Chuckles Hansel	7	10-11	Paul Leach	David Barons
1980	Henry Kissinger	6	10-10	Paul Barton	David Gandolfo
1981	Rathconrath	8	11-08	John Francome	Fred Winter
1982	Celtic Isle	6	11-01	Sam Morshead	Mercy Rimell
1983	Half Free	7	10-11	Richard Linley	Fred Winter
1984	Beau Ranger	6	9-08	John Hurst	John Thorne
1985	Oyster Pond	6	11-04	Graham McCourt	Matt McCourt
1986	Von Trappe	9	11-07	Ben de Haan	Jenny Pitman
1987	Sun Rising	9	10-13	Kevin Mooney	Fulke Walwyn
1988	Farmlea Boy	8	10-04	Richard Guest	Toby Balding
1989	Tonights The Night	8	10–13	Jamie Osborne	Oliver Sherwood
1990	Panto Prince	9	11-10	Brendan Powell Snr	Chris Popham
1991	Foyle Fisherman	12	10-07	Eamon Murphy	Josh Gifford
1992	Captain Dibble	7	11-08	Carl Llewellyn	Nigel Twiston-Davies
1993	Panto Prince	12	11-10	Brendan Powell Snr	Chris Popham
1994	Lusty Light	8	10-07	Warren Marston	Jenny Pitman
1995	Tug of Peace	8	10–11	Barney Clifford	Toby Balding
1996	Coome Hill	7	11-07	Jimmy Frost	Walter Dennis
1997	Lively Knight	8	11-01	Leighton Aspell	Josh Gifford
1998	Teeton Mill	9	11-04	Norman Williamson	Venetia Williams
1999	Flaked Oats	10	10-03	Robert Widger	Paul Nicholls
2000	Flaked Oats	11	10-05	Timmy Murphy	Paul Nicholls
2001	Montifault	6	11-03	Timmy Murphy	Paul Nicholls
2002	Swansea Bay	6	10-01	Andrew Thornton	Peter Bowen
2003	Swansea Bay	7	11-06	Andrew Thornton	Peter Bowen
2004	Royal Auclair	7	11–12	Christian Williams	Paul Nicholls
2005	Iris Bleu	9	11-02	Timmy Murphy	Martin Pipe
2006	Parsons Legacy	8	10-05	Richard Johnson	Philip Hobbs
2007	Abragante	6	10-04	Timmy Murphy	David Pipe
2008	Cornish Sett	9	11-07	Nick Scholfield	Paul Nicholls
2009	Ellerslie George	9	10-09	Robbie Henderson	Nick Mitchell
2010	Meanus Dandy	7	10-02	Ian Popham	Paul Nicholls
2011	The Minack	7	11-07	Daryl Jacob	Paul Nicholls
2012	The Package	9	11-01	Timmy Murphy	David Pipe
2013	Standing Ovation	6	10-02	Conor O'Farrell	David Pipe
2014	Court By Surprise (Note: The Young Master finished first in 2014 but was disqualified as he was not qualified to run in the race.)	9	11–07	Daryl Jacob	Emma Lavelle
2015	Drop Out Joe	7	11-06	Aidan Coleman	Charlie Longsdon
2016	Gentleman Jon	8	10-06	Tom O'Brien	Colin Tizzard
2017	Present Man	7	10-09	Bryony Frost	Paul Nicholls
2018	Present Man	8	11-09	Bryony Frost	Paul Nicholls
2019	Give Me A Copper	8	11-01	Harry Cobden	Paul Nicholls
2020	El Presente	7	11-08	David Bass	Kim Bailey
2021	Rocco	8	10-07	Jordan Nailor	Nigel Twiston-Davies
2022	Frodon	10	12-00	Bryony Frost	Paul Nicholls
2023	Blackjack Magic	8	10-02	Rex Dingle	Anthony Honeyball
2024	Al Dancer	11	12-00	Callum Pritchard	Sam Thomas
2025	Gustavian	10	10-03	Rex Dingle	Anthony Honeyball
2026	Montregard	7	10-11	Harry Cobden	Tom Lacey

== See also ==
- Horse racing in Great Britain
- List of British National Hunt races
