= Normans Grove Chase =

Discontinued steeplechase horse race in Ireland

Normans Grove Chase
2017
Ballycasey	Ball D'arc	Flemenstar

Previous years
2016
Top Gamble	Sizing Granite	Days Hotel
2015
Twinlight	Mallowney	Savello
2014
Arvika Ligeonniere	Twinlight	Foildubh
2013
Foildubh	Days Hotel	Lead Kindly Light
2012
Blazing Tempo	Noble Prince	Tranquil Sea
2011
Golden Silver	Rubi Light	Let Yourself Go

2010-2001
2010
Scotsirish	Snowy Morning	Mansony
2009
Mansony	Thyne Again	Southern Vic
2008
Nickname	Kicking King	Newmill
2007
Nickname	Justified	Central House
2006
Fota Island	Old Flame	Strike Back
2005
Central House	Colonel Rayburn	Glenelly Gale
2004
Florida Pearl	Rince Ri	Rathgar Beau
2003
Colonel Braxton	Go Roger Go	Knife Edge
2002
Arctic Copper	Fadoudal Du Cochet	Alcapone
2001
Klairon Davis	Papillon	Mr Baxter Basics

2000-1997
2000
Mr Baxter Basics	Klairon Davis	Ollimar
1999
Klairon Davis	Opera Hat	Anabatic
1998
Klairon Davis	Merry Gale	Fiftysevenchannels
1997
Fiftysevenchannels	Beakstown	Minstrel Fire

The Normans Grove Chase was a Grade 2 steeplechase National Hunt race in Ireland. It was run at Fairyhouse Racecourse over a distance of 2 miles and 1 furlong and took place each year in March or April at the course's Easter Festival. The 2017 running was moved to a fixture in early April to avoid clashing with similar races at the Punchestown Festival. Prior to 2013 the race took place in January.

The race was first run in 1997. It was awarded Grade 3 status in 2004 and then raised to Grade 2 status the following year.

The race was run for the last time in 2017. In 2018, Fairyhouse and Navan agreed to swap the distances of their two Graded Chases scheduled for the spring, leading to the creation of the Devenish Chase and the discontinuation of this race.

== Records ==
Most successful horse (2 wins):

- Klairon Davis – 1998, 1999, 2001

Leading jockey (5 wins):

- Ruby Walsh – Nickname (2007, 2008), Blazing Tempo (2012), Twinlight (2015), Ballycasey (2017)

Leading trainer (7 wins):

- Willie Mullins - Florida Pearl (2004), Scotsirish (2010), Golden Silver (2011), Blazing Tempo (2012), Arvika Ligeonniere (2014), Twinlight (2015), Ballycasey (2017)

== Winners ==
- Amateur jockeys indicated by "Mr".

Year	Winner	Age	Jockey	Trainer
1997	Fiftysevenchannels		Charlie Swan	Enda Bolger
1998	Klairon Davis		Richard Dunwoody	Arthur Moore
1999	Klairon Davis		Conor O'Dwyer	Arthur Moore
2000	Mr Baxter Basics		Jason Titley	Tom Taaffe
2001	Klairon Davis		Conor O'Dwyer	Arthur Moore
2002	Arctic Copper		Paul Carberry	Noel Meade
2003	Colonel Braxton		Kieran Kelly	Dessie Hughes
2004	Florida Pearl		Richard Johnson	Willie Mullins
2005	Central House		Paul Carberry	Dessie Hughes
2006	Fota Island		Tony McCoy	Mouse Morris
2007	Nickname		Ruby Walsh	Martin Brassil
2008	Nickname ^{[1]}		Ruby Walsh	Martin Brassil
2009	Mansony		Davy Russell	Arthur Moore
2010	Scotsirish		Ruby Walsh	Willie Mullins
2011	Golden Silver		Paul Townend	Willie Mullins
2012	Blazing Tempo		Ruby Walsh	Willie Mullins
2013	Foildubh		Paul Carberry	John Patrick Ryan
2014	Arvika Ligeonniere		Paul Townend	Willie Mullins
2015	Twinlight		Ruby Walsh	Willie Mullins
2016	Top Gamble	8	Richard Johnson	Kerry Lee
2017	Ballycasey	10	Ruby Walsh	Willie Mullins

^{1} The 2008 race took place at Gowran Park.

== See also ==
- List of Irish National Hunt races
