= Martha's Son =

British-bred Thoroughbred racehorse

- Sire: Idiot's Delight
- Grandsire: Silly Season
- Dam: Lady Martha
- Damsire: Sidon
- Sex: Gelding
- Foaled: 7 May 1987
- Country: United Kingdom
- Colour: Bay
- Breeder: Michael Ward-Thomas
- Owner: Michael Ward-Thomas & Paddy Hartigan
- Trainer: Tim Forster
- Record: 26: 15-3-2
- Earnings: £257,635

Major wins
- Peterborough Chase (1994); Victor Chandler Chase (1995); Comet Chase (1995); Queen Mother Champion Chase (1997); Melling Chase (1997)

Martha's Son (7 May 1987 – May 1999) was a British Thoroughbred racehorse who competed under National Hunt rules. After competing in minor hurdle events for the first two years of his racing career, he demonstrated dramatic improvement when switched to steeplechasing, winning nine consecutive races including the Peterborough Chase, Victor Chandler Chase and Comet Chase. He returned after a long injury lay-off to produce his best form as a ten-year-old in the spring of 1997, defeating strong fields in both the Queen Mother Champion Chase and the Melling Chase. His veteran trainer Tim Forster regarded him as the best horse he had ever trained. Martha's Son was retired from racing after failing to recover from serious muscular injuries in a race in November 1997. He died in May 1999.

== Background ==
Martha's Son was a bay gelding with a small white star bred in the United Kingdom by Michael Ward-Thomas. He was sired by Idiot's Delight a successful National Hunt stallion whose other progeny included Cavvie's Clown (three-time winner of the Jim Ford Chase and runner up in the Cheltenham Gold Cup), Clever Folly (winner of twenty eight races including the December Gold Cup) and Ida's Delight (Castleford Chase). Martha's Son's dam, Lady Martha was a descendant of Loch Cash, the dam of the King George VI Chase winner Lochroe.

During his racing career, Martha's Son was owned by Ward-Thomas in partnership with Paddy Hartigan, a civil engineer and antique dealer. The gelding was sent into training with Captain Tim Forster (trainer of three Grand National winners) at Letcombe Bassett in Oxfordshire. Forster moved his string of horses, including Martha's Son, to his new base at Downton Hall near Ludlow, in Shropshire in the summer of 1994. Forster was well known for his pessimism; before the 1980 Grand National his instructions to the rider of Ben Nevis, the eventual winner, were "keep remounting".

== Racing career ==
=== 1991/1992 season: Novice Hurdles ===
Martha's Son began his racing career in a novice hurdle at Stratford Racecourse on 28 December 1991. After the race, Forster in a typically downbeat assessment told Ward-Thomas "I will never, as long as I train, win a steeplechase with this horse. He will never jump fences". Starting a 25/1 outsider he recovered from interference to take the lead at the second last hurdle and won by five lengths from the Jenny Pitman-trained Lusty Light. On his next appearance in January, the gelding started favourite but fell at the second last when disputing the lead with the eventual winner Knight In Side. At Fakenham Racecourse a month later he was again favoured in the betting but was beaten ten lengths into second by Steveadon. On 7 March Martha's Son was matched against more experienced opponents when he contested a handicap hurdle for amateur riders at Sandown Park Racecourse. Ridden by Captain C Ward-Thomas he carried 146 pounds and finished ninth of the ten runners.

=== 1992/1993 season: Hurdle races ===
Martha's Son began his second season on 12 October with a win in a handicap hurdle at Fontwell Racecourse, beating Tel E Thon by five lengths under a weight of 144 pounds. After finishing third in a similar event at Huntingdon Racecourse twelve days later he won again at Wincanton Racecourse in November, carrying 150 pounds and beating seven opponents at odds of 13/2. He continued to rise in the handicap weights and carried 153 pounds when winning a more valuable race at Newbury Racecourse in January. Carl Llewellyn who had ridden the horse in his last four races, was replaced by Brendan Powell when Martha's Son contested the Lanzarote Hurdle at Kempton Park Racecourse later that month. The gelding began to struggle after the fifth hurdle and was pulled up before the last. He did not race again that season.

=== 1993/1994 season: Novice Chases ===
Martha's Son began his next season in handicap hurdles, finishing fourth at Newbury in October and second at Sandown in October. In the latter race he was ridden by Rodney Farrant, who became his regular jockey. He was then switched to larger obstacles and began to compete in novice chases. He made a successful chasing debut at Nottingham Racecourse on 3 December, taking the lead after the last and winning by three and a half lengths from the favourite Rodeo Star. When matched against more experienced opposition in a handicap chase at Huntingdon in January and won again, beating Spree Cross by two and a half lengths. Returning to novice company at the same track in March, he remained unbeaten over fences beating three opponents at odds of 4/6. Almost all of the geldings races up to this point had been over two miles, but for his final appearance of the season he was moved up to two and a half miles for a novice chase at Sandown on 29 March. Starting at odds of 8/15, he took the lead at the second last fence and accelerated clear in the closing stages to win by fourteen lengths from Yorkshire Gale.

=== 1994/1995 season: Steeplechases ===
On his first appearance of the 1994/1995 season Martha's Son faced the Rowland Meyrick Chase winner General Pershing and the Northumberland Gold Cup winner Clay County in a two-mile handicap chase at Haydock Park Racecourse on 2 November. He took the lead approaching the last fence and went clear on the run-in to win by eight lengths from Clay County, taking his winning run to five. Three weeks later Martha's Son was moved up in class to contest the Peterborough Chase at Huntingdon in which he was matched against the 1993 Champion Chaser Deep Sensation. Martha's Son led from the ninth fence until the final obstacle when he made a bad jumping error and was overtaken by Deep Sensation, but rallied on the run-in to regain the advantage and won by one and a quarter lengths. Moved up to two miles five furlongs on Boxing Day, Martha's Son won his seventh consecutive race when he won the Mid Season Chase at Wincanton.

Martha's Son's first race of 1995 saw him carrying 149 pounds and starting at odds of 3/1 for the Grade 2 Victor Chandler Handicap Chase over two miles at Ascot Racecourse on 14 January. He was opposed by Viking Flagship, Storm Alert (twice winner of the United House Construction Chase), Deep Sensation, Uncle Ernie (Aintree Chase) and Coulton (Mersey Novices' Hurdle). Farrant restrained the gelding in the early stages before moving up to take the lead from Coulton at the second last and stayed on strongly on the run-in to win by two and a half lengths from Egypt Mill Prince. On 8 February Martha's Son attempted to extend his winning run to nine when he started favourite for the Grade 1 Comet Chase over two and a half miles at Ascot. His opponents again included Coulton and Deep Sensation as well as the Tripleprint Gold Cup winner Amtrak Express. He overtook Coulton at the third last and went clear to win "very easily" by seven lengths despite being eased down by Farrant in the closing stages.

On his final appearance of the season Martha's Son contested the Melling Chase at Aintree Racecourse and started 11/10 favourite ahead of Viking Flagship, who had won his second Champion Chase at the Cheltenham Festival three weeks earlier. After taking the lead after the second last he was overtaken on the run-in and sustained his first defeat in seventeen months as he finished third, beaten a short head and a length by Viking Flagship and Deep Sensation.

=== 1995/1996 season: Steeplechases ===
Martha's Son made only one appearance in the 1995/1996 season. At Huntingdon in November he started 10/11 favourite for the Peterborough Chase but was beaten a neck by the Nicky Henderson-trained Travado, to whom he was conceding four pounds. The veteran Docklands Express, winner of the Whitbread Gold Cup, Martell Cup and two editions of the Racing Post Chase was more than thirty lengths back in third. Martha's Son was being prepared for a run in the King George VI Chase at Kempton on Boxing Day when he sustained an injury which ended his season.

=== 1996/1997 season: Steeplechases ===
After being off the racecourse for fifteen months, Martha's Son returned in the two-mile Emblem Chase at Kempton Park on 22 February 1997. Ridden by Norman Williamson, he had little opportunity to show his wellbeing as he fell at the second fence of a race won by Viking Flagship. In order to prepare the horse for his next run he was taken to Bangor-on-Dee Racecourse for a schooling session but his participation in the Champion Chase at Cheltenham was in doubt until the last moment owing to the firm ground.

On 12 March 1997, Martha's Son made his first and only appearance at the Cheltenham Festival when he was one of six horses to contest the thirty-ninth running of the Champion Chase. The six-year-old Strong Promise headed the betting after beating One Man at level weights in the Comet Chase. The joint-second favourites were Viking Flagship (winner in 1994 and 1995) and the Irish challenger Klairon Davis (winner in 1996). Ask Tom, the winner of the Maghull Novices' Chase and the 1997 Victor Chandler Chase came next in the betting market ahead of Martha's Son, who started at 9/1. Farrant held up Martha's Son at the rear of the field before making progress approaching the third last where the leader Strong Promise made a bad mistake allowing Ask Tom to take the lead. Martha's Son made further progress on the outside and jumped the second last in a close fourth behind Ask Tom, Viking Flagship and the weakening Strong Promise before moving into third on the final turn. Approaching the final fence, Martha's Son moved up between Viking Flagship on the inside and Ask Tom and the outer and then jumped into the lead at the obstacle. He steadily increased his advantage on the run-in and won by two and a half lengths from Ask Tom, with Viking Flagship half a length away in third. The winning owners, Ward-Thomas and Hartigan were both seriously ill at the time and entered the winners circle on crutches. Ward-Thomas said "We had to run, as none of us may be around next year". Paddy Hartigan died less than four months later. Forster later admitted to the Racing Post's that he never expected the gelding to complete the race, saying "I was sure he'd clip the top of one and turn over".

On 4 April at Aintree, Martha's son faced a rematch with Ask Tom, Viking Flagship and Strong Promise in the Melling Chase over two and a half miles. Strong Promise was again made favourite on 9/4, with Martha's Son second choice on 5/2 ahead of Viking Flagship (11/4) and Ask Tom (4/1). As at Cheltenham, Carl Llewellyn restrained the horse at the back of the field and was still last of the four runners jumping the third last as Ask Tom and Strong Promise contested the lead. As Ask Tom weakened, Llewellyn moved Martha's Son forward on the inside and overtook Strong Promise approaching the final fence before drawing away on the run-in to win by five lengths. After the race Forster said "He's got two speeds. One is totally switched off and relaxed. The other is when you press the button and he fires away". Forster's assistant Henry Daly later recalled "Norman Williamson was on Strong Promise and he couldn't believe his eyes at the speed with which Martha's Son jumped past his horse. Martha's Son destroyed them."

== Final race, retirement and death ==
Martha's Son returned in the Peterborough Chase on 25 November 1997. He started joint-favourite with One Man but was pulled up and immediately dismounted by Farrant after jumping four fences. He was found to have sustained a serious muscle injury which "tore a large muscle away from the back of an elbow"

In December 1998, it was announced that the horse had failed to recover from the injury he had sustained in the Peterborough Chase and was retired from racing. He was sent to spend his retirement at Newmarket where he acted as a hack for the trainer Michael Bell. His physical condition, however, continued to deteriorate and he was euthanised in May 1999 and buried at Downton Hall. Henry Daly, who took over the training license when Forster retired owing to poor health, explained "although the injury healed well, the legacy of previous problems with the same leg resulted in a chronic carpal canal condition affecting the tendons and the knee. Despite careful nursing and management, he became unable to strengthen his forelimb and to lock his knee, so he could neither be ridden nor turned out without significant lameness. Rather than keep him permanently confined, he was quietly put to sleep last week."

Tim Forster, who died in April 1999, called Martha's Son "the best I've ever had. He was a child's pony at home and a tiger on the racecourse – all he wanted to do was please". Rodney Farrant, who retired from riding on 2000 at the age of twenty-seven said of Martha's Son that "when he was right, nothing could beat that horse".

== Pedigree ==
Pedigree of Martha's Son (GB), bay gelding, 1987
Sire Idiot's Delight (GB) 1970	Silly Season (USA); 1962	Tom Fool	Menow
Sire Idiot's Delight (GB) 1970	Silly Season (USA); 1962	Tom Fool	Gaga
Sire Idiot's Delight (GB) 1970	Silly Season (USA); 1962	Double Deal	Straight Deal
Sire Idiot's Delight (GB) 1970	Silly Season (USA); 1962	Double Deal	Nonats
Sire Idiot's Delight (GB) 1970	Dolphinet (GB); 1957	Big Game	Bahram
Sire Idiot's Delight (GB) 1970	Dolphinet (GB); 1957	Big Game	Myrobella
Sire Idiot's Delight (GB) 1970	Dolphinet (GB); 1957	Sea Gipsy	Ocean Swell
Sire Idiot's Delight (GB) 1970	Dolphinet (GB); 1957	Sea Gipsy	Wheedler
Dam Lady Martha (GB) 1974	Sidon (GB); 1964	Milesian	My Babu
Dam Lady Martha (GB) 1974	Sidon (GB); 1964	Milesian	Oatflake
Dam Lady Martha (GB) 1974	Sidon (GB); 1964	Mrs Siddons	Hard Sauce
Dam Lady Martha (GB) 1974	Sidon (GB); 1964	Mrs Siddons	Gainsborough Lady
Dam Lady Martha (GB) 1974	Cloonadoon (GB); 1964	Neron	Nearco
Dam Lady Martha (GB) 1974	Cloonadoon (GB); 1964	Neron	Loves Legend
Dam Lady Martha (GB) 1974	Cloonadoon (GB); 1964	Loch May	Ramtapa
Dam Lady Martha (GB) 1974	Cloonadoon (GB); 1964	Loch May	Loch Cash (Family: 23-a)
