= Melling Chase =

Steeplechase horse race in Britain

- Class: Grade 1
- Location: Aintree Racecourse; Merseyside, England
- Inaugurated: 1991
- Race type: Steeplechase
- Sponsor: My Pension Expert
- Website: Aintree

Race information
- Distance: 2m 4f (4,023 metres)
- Surface: Turf
- Track: Left-handed
- Qualification: Five-years-old and up
- Weight: 11 st 7 lb Allowances; 7 lb for mares
- Purse: £250,000 (2022); 1st: £140,325

Melling Chase
2026
| Grey Dawning | Solness | Heart Wood |

Previous years
2025
Jonbon | Protektorat | Matata
2024
Jonbon | Conflated | Protektorat
2023
Pic D'Orhy | Fakir D'Oudairies | Minella Drama
2022
Fakir D'Oudairies | Hitman | Sceau Royal
2021
Fakir D'Oudairies | Nuts Well | Itchy Feet

2020-2011
2019
Min | Politologue | Waiting Patiently
2018
Politologue | Min | Sizing Granite
2017
Fox Norton | Sub Lieutenant | Traffic Fluide
2016
God's Own | Al Ferof | Clarcam
2015
Don Cossack | Cue Card | Johns Spirit
2014
Boston Bob | Rolling Aces | Ballynagour
2013
Sprinter Sacre | Cue Card | Flemenstar
2012
Finian's Rainbow | Wishfull Thinking | Albertas Run
2011
Master Minded | Albertas Run | Somersby

2010-2001
2010
Albertas Run | Forpadydeplasterer | Monet's Garden
2009
Voy Por Ustedes | Schindlers Hunt | Nacarat
2008
Voy Por Ustedes | Master Minded | Tamarinbleu
2007
Monet's Garden | Taranis | Well Chief
2006
Hi Cloy | Fota Island | Mariah Rollins
2005
Moscow Flyer | Le Roi Miguel | Therealbandit
2004
Moscow Flyer | Isio | Native Upmanship
2003
Native Upmanship | Seebald | Kadarann
2002
Native Upmanship | Wahiba Sands | Fadalko
2001
Fadalko | Lady Cricket | Direct Route

2000-1991
2000
Direct Route | Flying Instructor | Makounji
1999
Direct Route | Mulligan | Call Equiname
1997
Martha's Son | Strong Promise | Viking Flagship
1996
Viking Flagship | Sound Man | Coulton
1995
Viking Flagship | Deep Sensation | Martha's Son
1994
Katabatic | Travado | Deep Sensation
1993
Deep Sensation | Redundant Pal | Gold Options
1992
Remittance Man | Edberg | Pat's Jester
1991
Blazing Walker | Katabatic | Waterloo Boy

The Melling Chase is a Grade 1 National Hunt steeplechase in Great Britain which is open to horses aged five years or older. It is run at Aintree over a distance of about 2 miles and 4 furlongs (4,023 metres), and during its running there are sixteen fences to be jumped. The race is scheduled to take place each year in early April.

The event is named after Melling, a nearby village which is made famous by Melling Road, a public road which crosses the racecourse. It was established in 1991, and it has held Grade 1 status throughout its history. The race is currently staged on the second day of the three-day Grand National meeting.

The field often includes horses which ran in the Queen Mother Champion Chase or the Ryanair Chase at the previous month's Cheltenham Festival.

== Records ==
Most successful horse (2 wins):

- Viking Flagship – 1995, 1996
- Direct Route – 1999, 2000
- Native Upmanship – 2002, 2003
- Moscow Flyer – 2004, 2005
- Voy Por Ustedes – 2008, 2009
- Fakir D'oudairies - 2021, 2022
- Jonbon - 2024, 2025

Leading jockey (4 wins):

- Barry Geraghty – Moscow Flyer (2004, 2005), Finian's Rainbow (2012), Sprinter Sacre (2013)

Leading trainer (5 wins):

- Nicky Henderson - Remittance Man (1992), Finian's Rainbow (2012), Sprinter Sacre (2013), Jonbon (2024, 2025)

== Winners ==
| Year | Winner | Age | Jockey | Trainer |
|---|---|---|---|---|
| 1991 | Blazing Walker | 7 | Chris Grant | Arthur Stephenson |
| 1992 | Remittance Man | 8 | Richard Dunwoody | Nicky Henderson |
| 1993 | Deep Sensation | 8 | Declan Murphy | Josh Gifford |
| 1994 | Katabatic | 11 | Simon McNeill | Josh Gifford |
| 1995 | Viking Flagship | 8 | Adrian Maguire | David Nicholson |
| 1996 | Viking Flagship | 9 | Tony McCoy | David Nicholson |
| 1997 | Martha's Son | 10 | Carl Llewellyn | Tim Forster |
| 1998 | Opera Hat | 10 | Conor O'Dwyer | John Fowler |
| 1999 | Direct Route | 8 | Norman Williamson | Howard Johnson |
| 2000 | Direct Route | 9 | Norman Williamson | Howard Johnson |
| 2001 | Fadalko | 8 | Ruby Walsh | Paul Nicholls |
| 2002 | Native Upmanship | 9 | Conor O'Dwyer | Arthur Moore |
| 2003 | Native Upmanship | 10 | Conor O'Dwyer | Arthur Moore |
| 2004 | Moscow Flyer | 10 | Barry Geraghty | Jessica Harrington |
| 2005 | Moscow Flyer | 11 | Barry Geraghty | Jessica Harrington |
| 2006 | Hi Cloy | 9 | Andrew McNamara | Michael Hourigan |
| 2007 | Monet's Garden | 9 | Tony Dobbin | Nicky Richards |
| 2008 | Voy Por Ustedes | 7 | Robert Thornton | Alan King |
| 2009 | Voy Por Ustedes | 8 | Robert Thornton | Alan King |
| 2010 | Albertas Run | 9 | Tony McCoy | Jonjo O'Neill |
| 2011 | Master Minded | 8 | Ruby Walsh | Paul Nicholls |
| 2012 | Finian's Rainbow | 9 | Barry Geraghty | Nicky Henderson |
| 2013 | Sprinter Sacre | 7 | Barry Geraghty | Nicky Henderson |
| 2014 | Boston Bob | 9 | Paul Townend | Willie Mullins |
| 2015 | Don Cossack | 8 | Tony McCoy | Gordon Elliott |
| 2016 | God's Own | 8 | Paddy Brennan | Tom George |
| 2017 | Fox Norton | 7 | Robbie Power | Colin Tizzard |
| 2018 | Politologue | 7 | Sam Twiston-Davies | Paul Nicholls |
| 2019 | Min | 8 | Ruby Walsh | Willie Mullins |
| | no race 2020 (Note: The 2020 running was cancelled because of the COVID-19 pandemic in the United Kingdom) |
| 2021 | Fakir D'oudairies | 6 | Mark Walsh | Joseph O'Brien |
| 2022 | Fakir D'oudairies | 7 | Mark Walsh | Joseph O'Brien |
| 2023 | Pic D'Orhy | 8 | Harry Cobden | Paul Nicholls |
| 2024 | Jonbon | 8 | Nico de Boinville | Nicky Henderson |
| 2025 | Jonbon | 9 | Nico de Boinville | Nicky Henderson |
| 2026 | Grey Dawning | 9 | Harry Skelton | Dan Skelton |

== See also ==
- Horse racing in Great Britain
- List of British National Hunt races
