= Voy Por Ustedes =

French-bred Thoroughbred racehorse

- Sire: Villez
- Dam: Nuit D'ecajeul
- Damsire: Matahawk
- Sex: Gelding
- Foaled: 2001
- Country: France
- Colour: Bay
- Breeder: Ecurie Macaire Guilllaume & F. Picoulet
- Owner: Sir Robert Ogden
- Trainer: Alan King
- Record: 29: 13-6-5
- Earnings: £816,133

Major wins
- Kingmaker Novices' Chase (2006); Arkle Challenge Trophy (2006); Desert Orchid Chase (2006, 2007); Queen Mother Champion Chase (2007); Melling Chase (2008, 2009); Ascot Chase (2009)

Voy Por Ustedes (foaled 26 April 2001) is a French-bred chaser.

== Background ==
Voy Por Ustedes is owned by Sir Robert Ogden and trained by Nicky Henderson. He was originally trained by Guillaume Macaire in France and was subsequently sold to the Million in Mind Partnership in December 2004.

== Racing career ==
The horse made his French debut when unseating his rider in a 3-year-old hurdle at Compeigne in France in September 2004 and raced four more times in France.

Voy Por Ustedes made his English debut at Lingfield on the 11 December 2004, when still trained by Guillaume Macaire and unseated his rider in a Grade 2 Novice Hurdle. Million in Mind then purchased the gelding as a replacement for Massac, who was trained for the Partnership by Alan King. Massac died in a fall at Cheltenham - the same day that Voy por Ustedes unseated his rider at Lingfield..

As with all Million in Mind Partnership horses, Voy por Ustedes was sold by auction at the Doncaster Bloodstock Sales at the end of the National Hunt Season in May 2005. He was purchased by Sir Robert Ogden for 106,000 guineas, and remained in training with Alan King at Burbury Castle until 2011 when he moved to the yard of Nicky Henderson.

== Steeplechasing ==
Vor Por Ustedes made his chasing debut at Warwick on 5 November 2005 and won in impressive style and proceeded to win three more novice chases at Plumpton, Warwick and Wincanton before winning the Arkle Challenge Trophy at the 2006 Cheltenham Festival defeating Monets Garden. His final run of the season was at Aintree but lost his unbeaten record over fences when finishing 2nd to Foreman.

His first run of the 2006–07 season was in the Grade 1 Tingle Creek Chase at Sandown but he was easily brushed aside by Kauto Star but still ran well to finish a clear 2nd. He won his next race at Kempton in December before unseating his rider at Newbury but made up for that slip-up when winning the Queen Mother Champion Chase at the Cheltenham Festival.

That was his last run of the 2006/07 season but was more aggressively trained in the 2007–08 season and finished 2nd in desperate conditions at Cheltenham in November 2007 before again finishing second to Twist Magic in the Tingle Creek Chase at Sandown.

He then went on to win the Desert Orchid Chase for the second time at Kempton then completing his preparation for the 2008 Queen Mother Champion Chase when a well beaten second to Master Minded at Newbury.

There wasn't to be a second victory in the Queen Mother Champion Chase as Master Minded put up one of the most impressive performances of all time when slamming Voy Por Ustedes by 19 lengths though Voy Por Ustedes still finished 16 lengths ahead of the third horse and possibly put up a better performance than when winning in 2007.

He gained his revenge over Master Minded when running away with the Melling Chase at Aintree in what was his first run over 2m 4f and the step-up in trip obviously brought out considerable improvement. This was his last run of the 2007–08 season. Voy Por Ustedes last ran in March 2011, after suffering a fracture to his ilium wing and pain in his lumbar region and left hind stifle in 2009 and has now retired.
