= Bryony Frost =

British National Hunt Jockey

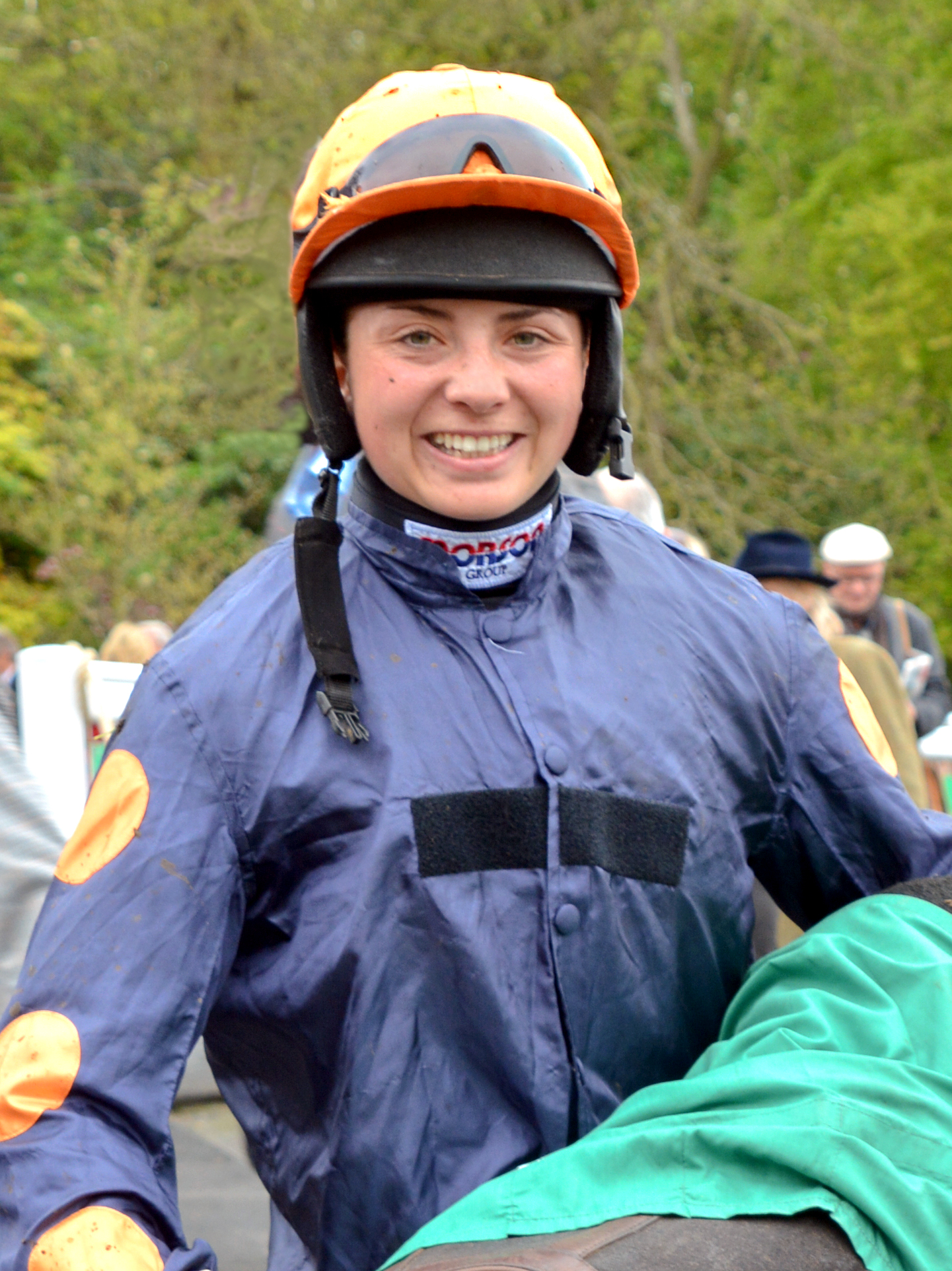
- Frost at Sandown Park 2018

Personal information
- Born: April 13, 1995 (age 31) Buckfastleigh, Devon
- Occupation: Jockey

Horse racing career
- Sport: Horse racing

Major racing wins
- Major race wins: King George VI Chase 2020; Ryanair Chase 2019

Significant horses
- Frodon, Secret Investor, Pacha Du Polder

Bryony Frost (born 13 April 1995) is an English National Hunt jockey from Buckfastleigh, Devon. In 2019 she became the first female jockey to win a Grade 1 race at the Cheltenham Festival.

== Background ==
Frost comes from a racing family. Her father, Jimmy Frost, is a trainer and former jockey who rode the winner of the 1989 Grand National, Little Polveir. Her grandfather, Richard Frost, was also a trainer. Her brother, Hadden Frost, is a former jockey who won numerous races including the Pertemps Final at the Cheltenham Festival on Buena Vista in 2010. Frost learnt to ride on a donkey, before winning multiple Devon and Cornwall pony racing championships.

== Career as a jockey ==
=== Early career ===
After competing in point-to-points, Frost had her first ride under rules, as an amateur, in February 2013. Two years later she had her first win under rules, riding Current Event, trained by Rose Loxton, at Musselburgh. In 2016 she started to ride for trainer Paul Nicholls. Still riding as an amateur jockey, Frost won the Foxhunter Chase at the 2017 Cheltenham Festival, riding Pacha Du Polder, trained by Nicholls. She turned professional in July 2017 and later that month secured her first win as a conditional jockey on the Nicholls-trained Black Corton at Worcester.

=== 2017/18 season ===
In November 2017, Frost rode the Nicholls-trained Present Man to win the Badger Beer Handicap Chase at Wincanton. She secured her first Grade 1 win on Boxing Day 2017, when Black Corton won the Kauto Star Novices’ Chase at Kempton on Boxing Day, becoming only the second British female jockey to win a Grade 1 race over obstacles. The following month she rode the Nicholls-trained Frodon to victory in the Grade 3 Crest Nicholson Handicap Chase at Cheltenham in January 2018. It was her second ride on Frodon and would prove the first of eleven victories for the popular partnership. Frost had her first Grand National ride in April 2018, coming fifth on the 25/1 chance Milansbar, trained by Neil King.

=== 2018/19 season ===
Frost and Present Man achieved a second victory in the Badger Beer Handicap Chase in November 2018. Later that month she rode out her claim, becoming only the fifth British based female jockey to achieve 75 wins over jumps. Frodon brought her victories in the Grade 2 Old Roan Chase at Aintree, the Grade 3 Caspian Caviar Gold Cup and the Grade 2 Cotswold Chase, both at Cheltenham. In March 2019 she became the first woman to win a Grade 1 race at the Cheltenham Festival when Frodon carried her to victory in the Ryanair Chase. She finished the season on 49 winners and in April 2019 was awarded the British conditional jockeys title.

=== 2019/20 and 2020/21 seasons ===
There was a further victory for Frost and Frodon when they won the Grade 2 Silviniaco Conti Chase in January 2020 at Kempton. Frodon was beaten into fourth place when attempting to secure back-to-back wins in the Ryanair Chase at the 2020 Cheltenham Festival.

In December 2020, Frost rode Frodon to victory in the King George VI Chase at Kempton, becoming the first female jockey to win the race. It was her 175th career win, making her the all-time leading female National Hunt jump jockey in Britain. In April 2021, Frost had her second ride in the Grand National and was unseated by Yala Enki at the 20th fence. Later in the month, she rode a big-race double at Sandown, winning the Grade 2 Oaksey Chase on Frodon and the Grade 1 Celebration Chase on Greaneteen, also trained by Nicholls.

=== 2021/22, 2022/23, 2023/24 and 2024/25 seasons ===
The 2021/22 season began with two more Grade 1 successes for Frost. Frodon won the Ladbrokes Champion Chase at Down Royal in Ireland in October and Greaneteen won the Tingle Creek Chase at Sandown in December. Frost achieved a third victory in the Badger Beer Handicap Chase, this time riding Frodon, in November 2022. Victories in the 2023/24 season included the Grade 3 Red Rum Handicap Chase at Aintree in April 2024.

During the 2022/23 and 2023/24 seasons, Frost was given fewer rides than previously. Nicholls said: "She's riding well. I think the public like her more than some trainers do as she doesn’t seem to get too many rides these days, but she’s still riding as good as ever." He gave his support to her decision to move to, and ride in, France. In May 2024 Frost was appointed retained jockey in France to owners Simon Munir and Isaac Souede. She won the Cravache d'Or Feminine (top female jockey in France) in 2025 with 28 wins.

== BHA investigation ==
In September 2020, Frost lodged a complaint with the British Horseracing Authority (BHA) about bullying and harassment by jockey Robbie Dunne. The BHA opened an investigation in April 2021. In December 2021, the BHA announced that an independent panel had upheld the allegations against Dunne after hearing evidence from Frost, Dunne, and a number of other jockeys. Dunne was banned for 18 months, reduced to 10 months on appeal.

== Cheltenham Festival winners (2) ==
- Foxhunter Chase - (1) Pacha Du Polder - (2017)
- Ryanair Chase - (1) Frodon - (2019)

== Other major wins ==
(United Kingdom) Great Britain

- King George VI Chase - (1) Frodon (2020)
- Celebration Chase - (1) Greaneteen (2021)
- Tingle Creek Chase - (1) Greaneteen (2021)

(Republic of Ireland) Ireland

- Ladbrokes Champion Chase - (1) Frodon (2021)
