= Monet's Garden (horse) =

Irish-bred Thoroughbred racehorse

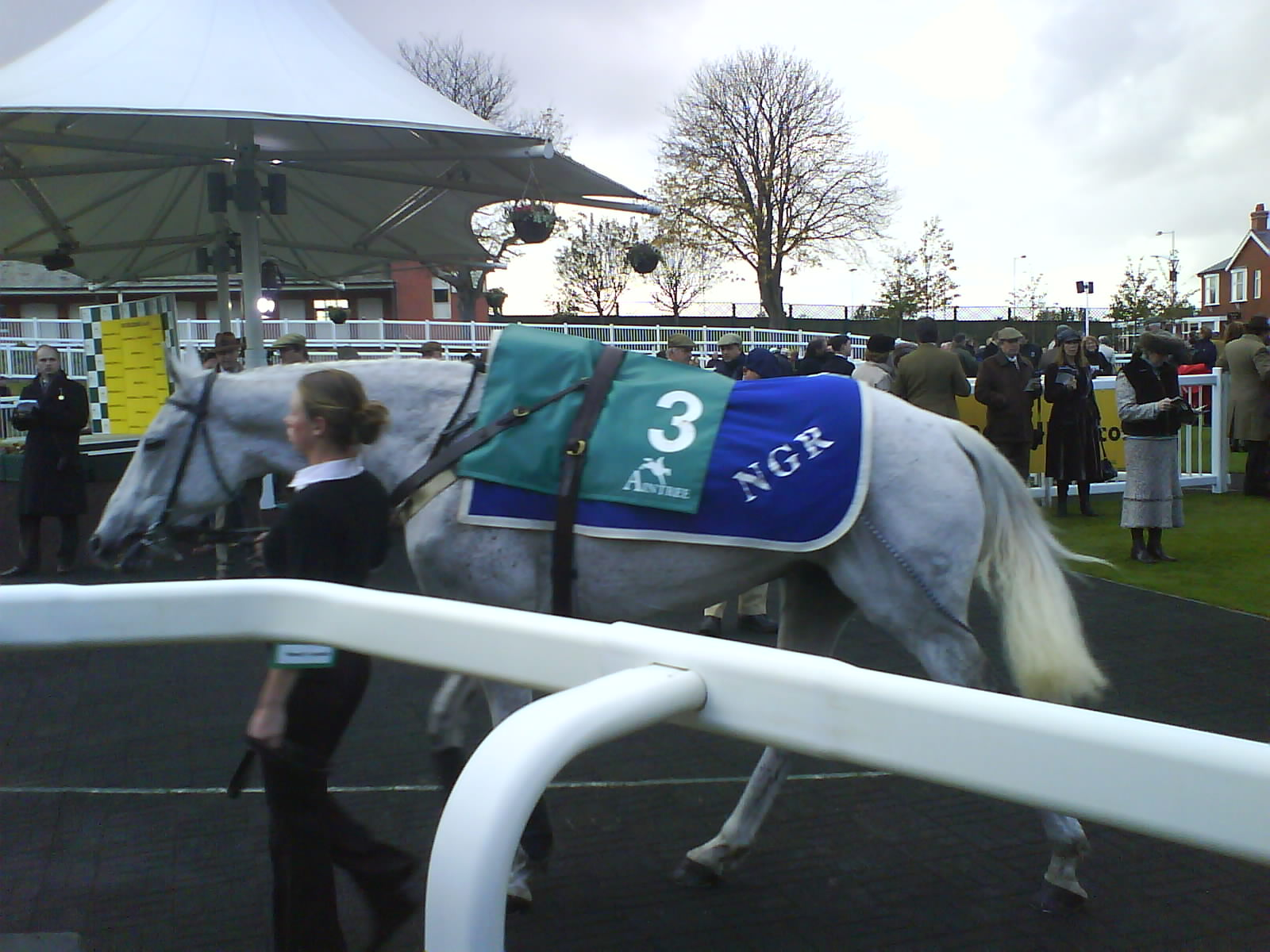
- Sire: Roselier
- Grandsire: Misti IV
- Dam: Royal Remainder
- Damsire: Remainder Man
- Sex: Gelding
- Foaled: 1 April 1998
- Country: Ireland
- Colour: Grey
- Breeder: William Delahunty
- Owner: David Wesley Yates
- Trainer: Nicky Richards
- Record: 32: 17-4-2
- Earnings: £683,265

Major wins
- Ascot Hurdle (2004); Liverpool Hurdle (2005); Future Champion Novices' Chase (2006); Ascot Chase (2007, 2010); Melling Chase (2007); Old Roan Chase (2007, 2009, 2010); Peterborough Chase (2008)

Monet's Garden was an Irish racehorse. Born in April 1998, he was a winner in 17 of his 32 starts, being placed second four times and third on two other occasions, earning £683,265 total prize money and never having failed to finish a race. The grey gelding was bred by William Delahunty, owned by David Wesley Yates and trained by Nicky Richards at his stables in Greystoke, Cumbria. In 23 of his 32 starts he was ridden by stable jockey Tony Dobbin, the partnership ending with Dobbin's retirement in April 2008.

== Aintree Record ==
Although Monet's Garden was a winner of big races at Ascot and Huntingdon, he was perhaps best known for his wins at Aintree: Of his 32 career starts, 9 of them were at Aintree, producing 5 wins. He finished runner-up to Garde Champetre in the 2004 Mersey Novices' Hurdle, notably beating Inglis Drever into fourth place with Court Shareef in third. His next appearance at Liverpool was in the Liverpool Hurdle of 2005, then only a Grade 2 contest. Monet's Garden went one better this time however in a dramatic race- with the well fancied Rule Supreme unseating Ruby Walsh after being hampered by the refusing Westender at only the second flight.

Monet's Garden would next appear at Aintree for the 2007 renewal of the Grade 1 Melling Chase, when he recorded a sound victory over Taranis and Well Chief.

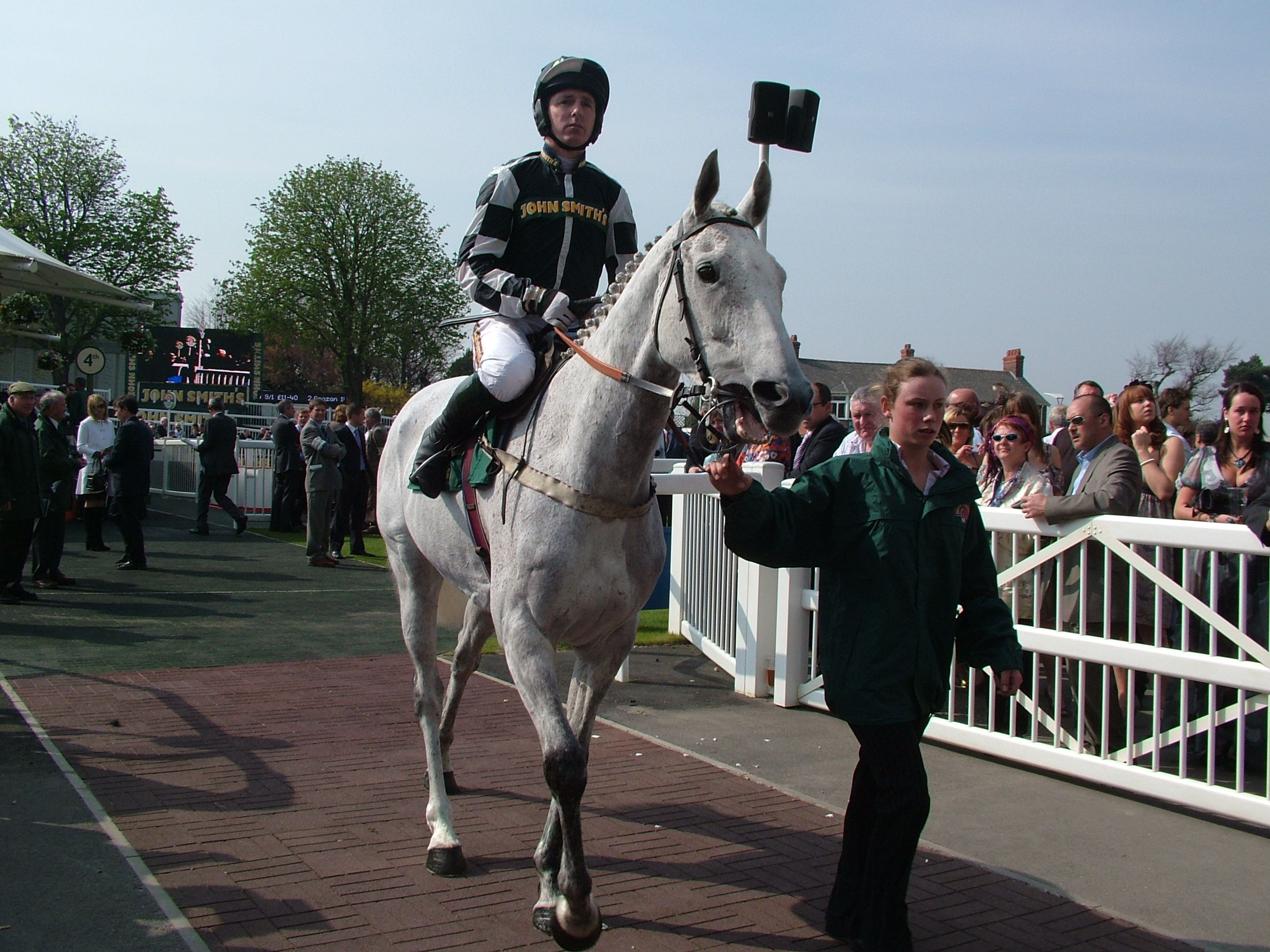

His next start at Aintree was also a winning one on his 2007–08 National Hunt Season reappearance in the Grade 2 Old Roan Chase. He beat the then Gold Cup hero Kauto Star, although the latter was conceding weight all-round to his three rivals on his reappearance. Monet's Garden wouldn't then win at Aintree again for a clear two years- he was well beaten in the Totesport Bowl in 2008 and was beaten again in the 2008 renewal of the Old Roan by Knowhere. However, in the 2009 renewal, he made most of the running en route to convincingly reversing that 2008 form, with Tidal Bay in second, said 2008 victor Knowhere coming home in third and subsequent Grand National winner Don't Push It in fourth. In 2010, ridden by Dougie Costello, he achieved a third victory in the Old Roan Chase, making all the running and holding off a challenge from Poquelin in the run-in. It was to be his last race.

== Ascot and Windsor ==
Monet's Garden had a good record at Ascot, winning twice and finishing second out of four starts. He also won the Ascot Hurdle when it was staged at Windsor in November 2004, with Ascot being closed for rebuilding at the time- beating Monkerhostin by a clear 4 lengths.

His first win at Ascot was achieved in great fashion in the Ascot Chase of 2007, when beating Thisthatandtother, River City, Fota Island and Central House.

His next start at Ascot would be in the 2008 renewal of the Ascot Chase, although this time Kauto Star convincingly exacted his revenge for his Old Roan defeat earlier that Season. He would be well beaten again when contesting the Amlin 1965 Grade 2 Chase in November 2009, although Monet's Garden rolled back the years in his final start at Ascot in the Ascot Chase of 2010- beating subsequent Ryanair and Melling Chase victor Alberta's Run by a length and a half.

== Peterborough Chase ==
Monet's Garden won the 2008 Totesport Peterborough Chase at Huntingdon, narrowly beating 2008 Betfair Chase winner Snoopy Loopy by a half length.

== Retirement ==
Monet's Garden returned lame after his win in the 2010 Old Roan Chase and missed his intended target of competing in the 2010 Peterborough Chase. He developed an infection in a bone in his hoof and underwent extensive treatment at Oaklands Veterinary Centre at Yarm in North Yorkshire. His retirement was announced in January 2011.

In October 2011, it was announced that the Old Roan Chase would be renamed the Monet's Garden Old Roan Chase in honour of the three-time winner and the horse would return to Aintree to parade before racegoers.

In 2013, he followed Grand National legend Red Rum in having a bar at Carlisle racecourse named after him and was present at the opening of Monet's Bar.

Following his retirement, Monet's Garden had a second career in the show-ring, ridden by his trainer's daughter Jo Richards. In 2016 he won the Retraining of Racehorses (RoR) veteran final at Aintree and was crowned RoR Horse of the Year later that year.

Monet's Garden was euthanized on 20 November 2018. Jockey Tony Dobbin paid tribute to him: "He was just the sweetest animal, the best ride and one of the best jumpers I’ve ever sat on. He never fell, he was bold and he was quick, he could do everything".
