= Ascot Chase =

Steeplechase horse race in Britain

Ascot Chase
2026
Jonbon	Pic D'Orhy	Blow Your Wad

Previous years
2025
Pic D'Orhy	Corbetts Cross	Blue Lord
2024
Pic D'Orhy	L'Homme Presse	Ahoy Senor
2023
Shishkin	Pic D'Orhy	Fakir D'Oudairies
2022
Fakir D'Oudairies	Two For Gold	Fanion D'estruval
2021
Dashel Drasher	Master Tommytucker	Bennys King

2020-2011
2020
Riders Onthe Storm	Janika	Only two finished
2019
Cyrname	Waiting Patiently	Fox Norton
2018
Waiting Patiently	Cue Card	Frodon
2017
Cue Card	Shantou Flyer	Royal Regatta
2016
Silviniaco Conti	Dynaste	Royal Regatta
2015
Balder Succes	Ma Filleule	Ballycasey
2014
Captain Chris	Cloudy Too	Hunt Ball
2013
Cue Card	Captain Chris	Ghizao
2012
Riverside Theatre	Medermit	Gauvain
2011
Riverside Theatre	Gauvain	Deep Purple

2010-2001
2010
Monet's Garden	Albertas Run	The Sawyer
2009
Voy Por Ustedes	Gwanako	Tamarinbleu
2008
Kauto Star	Monet's Garden	Racing Demon
2007
Monet's Garden	Thisthatandtother	River City
2006
Our Vic	My Will	Fondmort
2005
It Takes Time	Ollie Magern	Hand Inn Hand
2004
Hand Inn Hand	Impek	See You Sometime
2003
Tiutchev	Geos	Tresor De Mai
2002
Tresor De Mai	Banker Count	Celibate
2001
Tiutchev	Celibate	The Outback Way

2000-1995
2000
Rockforce	Celibate	Strong Promise
1999
Teeton Mill	Senor El Betrutti	Super Coin
1998
One Man	Strong Promise	Senor El Betrutti
1997
Strong Promise	One Man	Sound Man
1996
Sound Man	Easy Buck	Storm Alert
1995
Martha's Son	Coulton	Amtrak Express

The Ascot Chase is a Grade 1 National Hunt steeplechase in Great Britain which is open to horses aged five years or older. It is run at Ascot over a distance of about 2 miles and 5 furlongs (2 miles, 5 furlongs and 85 yards, or 4,302 metres), and during its running there are seventeen fences to be jumped. The race is scheduled to take place each year in February.

The event was first run in 1995, as the Comet Chase, and its distance was originally set at 2 miles and 3½ furlongs (3,923 metres). This was modified slightly when the race was temporarily switched to Lingfield Park, and also upon its return to Ascot in 2007. The present length was introduced in 2008.

The race was run on a Wednesday until 1998, moving to its current Saturday in 1999. It replaced the Whitbread Trial Handicap (3 miles 100 yards) on the Wednesday card, a race which was first run in 1966.

== Records ==
Most successful horse (2 wins):

- Tiutchev – 2001, 2003
- Monet's Garden – 2007, 2010
- Riverside Theatre – 2011, 2012
- Cue Card – 2013, 2017
- Pic d'Orhy - 2024, 2025

Leading jockey (3 wins):

- Barry Geraghty – Monet's Garden (2010), Riverside Theatre (2011, 2012)
- Harry Cobden - Cyrname (2019), Pic d'Orhy (2024, 2025)

Leading trainer (6 wins):

- Paul Nicholls - Rockforce (2000), Kauto Star (2008), Silviniaco Conti (2016), Cyrname (2019), Pic D'Orhy (2024, 2025)

== Winners ==
Year	Winner	Age	Jockey	Trainer
1995	Martha's Son	8	Rodney Farrant	Tim Forster
1996	Sound Man	8	Richard Dunwoody	Edward O'Grady
1997	Strong Promise	6	Norman Williamson	Geoff Hubbard
1998	One Man	10	Tony Dobbin	Gordon W. Richards
1999	Teeton Mill	10	Norman Williamson	Venetia Williams
2000	Rockforce	8	Joe Tizzard	Paul Nicholls
2001	Tiutchev	8	Mick Fitzgerald	Nicky Henderson
2002	Tresor de Mai	8	Tony McCoy	Martin Pipe
2003	Tiutchev	10	Tony McCoy	Martin Pipe
2004	Hand Inn Hand	8	Mark Bradburne	Henry Daly
2005 (Note: The 2005 and 2006 runnings took place at Lingfield Park as Ascot was closed for redevelopment)	It Takes Time	11	Jamie Moore	Martin Pipe
2006	Our Vic	8	Timmy Murphy	Martin Pipe
2007	Monet's Garden	9	Tony Dobbin	Nicky Richards
2008	Kauto Star	8	Ruby Walsh	Paul Nicholls
2009	Voy Por Ustedes	8	Robert Thornton	Alan King
2010	Monet's Garden	12	Barry Geraghty	Nicky Richards
2011	Riverside Theatre	7	Barry Geraghty	Nicky Henderson
2012	Riverside Theatre	8	Barry Geraghty	Nicky Henderson
2013	Cue Card	7	Joe Tizzard	Colin Tizzard
2014	Captain Chris	10	Richard Johnson	Philip Hobbs
2015	Balder Succes	7	Wayne Hutchinson	Alan King
2016	Silviniaco Conti	10	Noel Fehily	Paul Nicholls
2017	Cue Card	11	Paddy Brennan	Colin Tizzard
2018	Waiting Patiently	7	Brian Hughes	Ruth Jefferson
2019	Cyrname	7	Harry Cobden	Paul Nicholls
2020	Riders Onthe Storm	7	Sam Twiston-Davies	Nigel Twiston-Davies
2021	Dashel Drasher	8	Matt Griffiths	Jeremy Scott
2022	Fakir D'oudairies	7	Mark Walsh	Joseph O'Brien
2023	Shishkin	9	Nico de Boinville	Nicky Henderson
2024	Pic D'Orhy	9	Harry Cobden	Paul Nicholls
2025	Pic D'Orhy	10	Harry Cobden	Paul Nicholls
2026	Jonbon	10	Nico de Boinville	Nicky Henderson

== See also ==
- Horse racing in Great Britain
- List of British National Hunt races
