= Waiting Patiently =

Irish Thoroughbred racehorse

- Breed: Thoroughbred
- Sire: Flemensfirth
- Grandsire: Alleged (horse)
- Dam: Rossavon
- Damsire: Beneficial
- Sex: Gelding
- Foaled: 24 June 2011
- Country: Ireland
- Breeder: Vincent Finn
- Owner: Mr Richard Collins
- Trainer: Ruth Jefferson
- Record: 221/111/111
- Earnings: 238,000 GBP

Major wins
- Ascot Chase (2018) Altcar Novices' Chase (2017)

Waiting Patiently (foaled 24 June 2011) is a Thoroughbred horse competing in National Hunt racing. He tasted Grade 1 success in the Ascot Chase, beating the famous Cue Card. The horse is being trained by Ruth Jefferson.
