= Alan King (horse racing) =

Scottish racehorse trainer

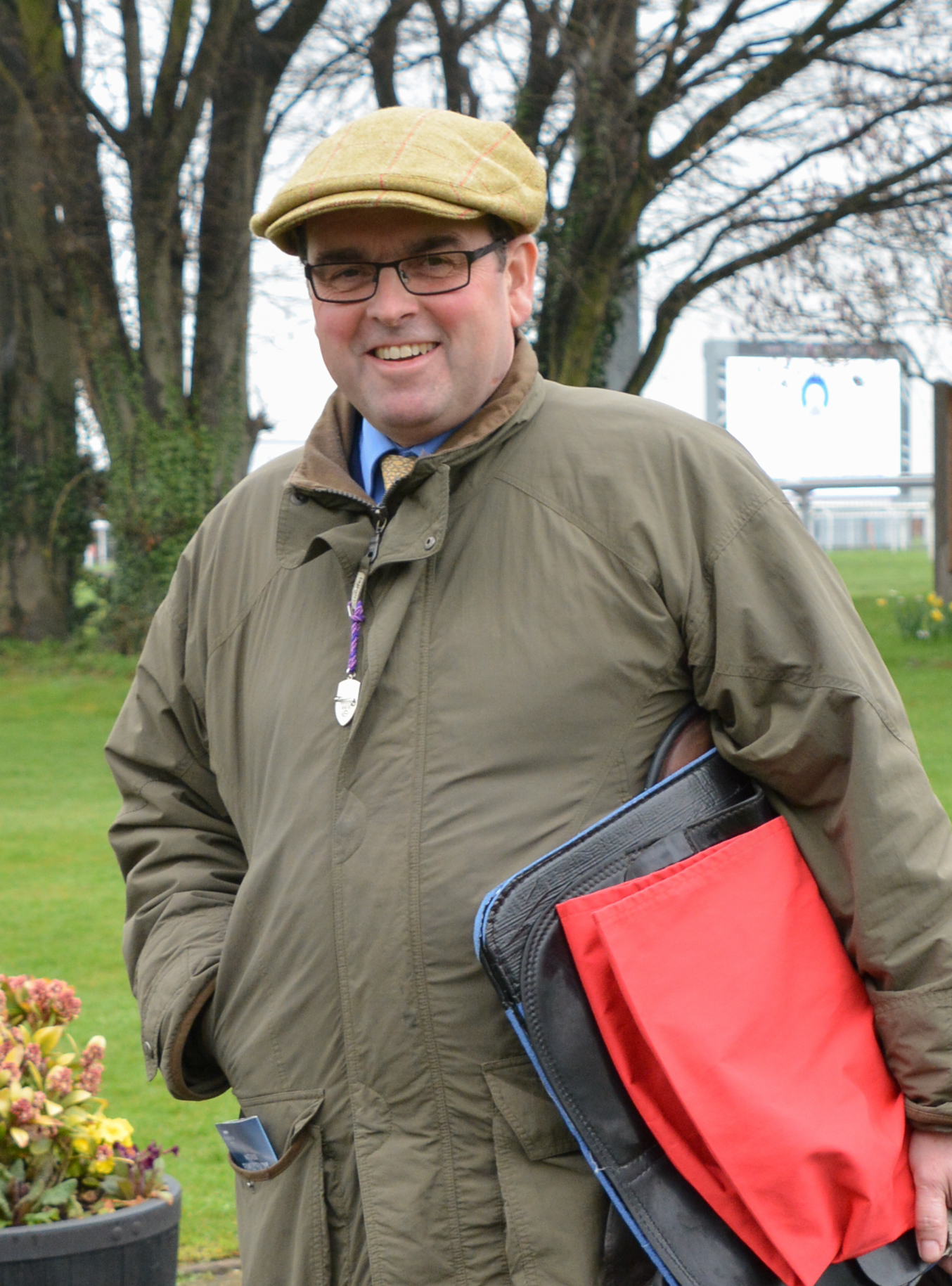
- King at Kempton Park 2018

Personal information
- Born: 13 December 1966 (age 59) Lanarkshire, Scotland
- Occupation: Trainer

Horse racing career
- Sport: Horse racing
- Career wins: 1770 (to April 2025)

Major racing wins
- As a trainer in English steeplechasing: Champion Hurdle (2008); Queen Mother Champion Chase (2007); Stayers' Hurdle (2006); Ryanair Chase (2015); Arkle Challenge Trophy; Christmas Hurdle

Alan King (born 13 December 1966) is a Scottish racehorse trainer specialising mainly in National Hunt racing. He is based at Barbury Castle stables near Wroughton, Wiltshire.

== Career ==
King was born in Lanarkshire, Scotland on 13 December 1966. He worked in Scotland under John Wilson at Cree Lodge, before joining David Nicholson as assistant trainer until Nicholson's retirement. He then took out a licence to train himself, first at Jackdaw's Castle stables, before moving to Barbury Castle, Wiltshire in June 2000.

His biggest wins at the Cheltenham Festival have come with My Way de Solzen in the 2006 World Hurdle, Voy Por Ustedes in the 2007 Queen Mother Champion Chase, Katchit in the 2008 Champion Hurdle, Oh Crick in the 2009 Johnny Henderson Grand Annual Chase and Uxizandre in the 2015 Ryanair Chase Despite a terrible year with injuries, the yard also had a 1–2 in the 2013 Coral Cup Handicap Hurdle with Medinas and Meister Eckhart.

His principal stable jockey until October 2019 was Wayne Hutchinson.

His career total earnings to April 2025 was just over £24 million.

== Cheltenham winners (16) ==
- Queen Mother Champion Chase - (1) Voy Por Ustedes (2007)
- Champion Hurdle - (1) Katchit (2008)
- Stayers' Hurdle - (1) My Way de Solzen (2006)
- Ryanair Chase - (1) Uxizandre (2015)
- Arkle Challenge Trophy -(3) Voy Por Ustedes (2006), My Way de Solzen (2007), Edwardstone (2022)
- Triumph Hurdle - (2) Penzance (2005), Katchit (2007)
- Spa Novices' Hurdle - (1) Nenuphar Collonges (2008)
- Festival Trophy Handicap Chase - (2) Fork Lightning (2004), Bensalem (2011)
- National Hunt Chase Challenge Cup - (2) Old Benny (2008), Midnight Prayer (2014)
- Coral Cup - (1) Medinas (2013)
- Johnny Henderson Grand Annual Chase - (1) Oh Crick (2009)

== Major wins ==
(United Kingdom) Great Britain

- Goodwood Cup - (1) Trueshan (2021)
- Long Walk Hurdle - (2) Anzum (1999), My Way de Solzen (2005)
- Henry VIII Novices' Chase - (3) Araldur (2008), Sceau Royal (2017), Edwardstone (2021)
- Christmas Hurdle - (1) Yanworth (2016)
- Finale Juvenile Hurdle - (2) Franchoek (2007), Walkon (2008)
- Challow Novices' Hurdle - (1) Messire Des Obeaux (2017)
- Scilly Isles Novices' Chase - (1) Medermit (2011)
- Anniversary 4-Y-O Novices' Hurdle - (4) Katchit (2007), Walkon (2009), Grumeti (2012), L'Unique (2013)
- Arkle Challenge Trophy - (1) - Edwardstone (2022)
- Ascot Chase - (2) Voy Por Ustedes (2009), Balder Succes (2015)
- Manifesto Novices' Chase - (1) Uxizandre (2018)
- Melling Chase - (2) Voy Por Ustedes (2008, 2009)
- Sefton Novices' Hurdle - (2) Stromness (2002), Lovcen (2012)
- Tingle Creek Chase - (1) - Edwardstone (2022)
- Maghull Novices' Chase - (1) Balder Succes (2014)
- Liverpool Hurdle - (3) Spendid (2002), Blazing Bailey (2008), Yanworth (2017)
- Celebration Chase - (1) Edwardstone (2026)

France

- Prix du Cadran – (2) – Trueshan (2021,2023)
