= Tony Dobbin =

Irish jockey

Tony Dobbin on Karelian in the 2007 WBX Novices' Chase.

Tony Dobbin (born 1 May 1972) is a retired Northern Irish National Hunt jockey who rode mainly in Great Britain. He rode the winner of the Grand National on Lord Gyllene in 1997 for owner Sir Stanley Clarke CBE, and won over 1,200 races during his career in the saddle. He was the regular stable jockey for Nicky Richards. He retired from racing on Thursday, 10 April 2008 riding the winner of his final race, Ballyvoge, at Carlisle Racecourse. He has assisted his wife, Rose Davidson, training racehorses since 2009.

== Major wins ==
(United Kingdom) Great Britain

- Grand National - (1) Lord Gyllene (1997)
- Ascot Chase - (2) One Man (1998), Monet's Garden (2007)
- Melling Chase - (1) Monet's Garden (2007)
- Liverpool Hurdle - (1) Monet's Garden (2005)
- Fighting Fifth Hurdle - (2) Barton (2000), Arcalis (2005)
- Aintree Hurdle - (1) Barton (2001)
- Mildmay Novices' Chase - (1) Barton (2002)
- Anniversary 4-Y-O Novices' Hurdle - (1) Quazar (2002)

(Republic of Ireland) Ireland

- Punchestown Champion Hurdle - (1) Quazar (2003)
