= Nicky Richards =

British racehorse trainer (born 1956)

Nicholas Gordon Richards (born 25 February 1956 in Alnwick, Northumberland) is a British racehorse trainer specialising mainly in National Hunt racing. He is based at stables at Greystoke, near Penrith, Cumbria, England

He was British champion amateur flat jockey in 1973 and subsequently worked as assistant trainer to his father, Gordon W. Richards. He took over the training licence when his father died in 1998. He saddled a winner with his first runner, Better Times Ahead, at Carlisle Racecourse in October 1998.

The most successful horse he has trained to date is Monet's Garden, winner of the Ascot Chase, Melling Chase and Old Roan Chase in 2007. The grey won his third Old Roan Chase in 2010 having also won it in 2009.

One of Richards most successful days as a trainer came at the Aintree Festival on 7 April 2005, when he trained three winners on the card. The horses involved were Monet's Garden, Faasel, and Turpin Green.

Richards reached the landmark of training 1,000 winners on 31 March 2026 when Jehol De Thaix won at Newcastle.
