= Brian Hughes (jockey) =

Northern Irish jockey

Brian Hughes (born 27 June 1985) is a Northern Irish jockey who competes in National Hunt racing. Hughes won the British jump racing Champion Jockey title three times. The first time was the 2019–20 season with 141 winners. Hughes comes from County Armagh, but is based in Northern England and became the first champion jockey based in the North since Jonjo O'Neill won the title in 1980. In January 2019, Hughes rode his 1,000th winner over jumps in Britain and Ireland on My Old Gold at Wetherby. In August 2026 Hughes rode his 2,000th winner over jumps in Britain and Ireland on Dolly Dior at Perth. On 20 April 2022, Hughes rode his 200th winner in a season - a feat previously achieved only by Peter Scudamore, AP McCoy & Richard Johnson. Hughes won his second jockeys' title for the 2021-22 season. Hughes won his third jockeys' title for the 2022-23 season.

== Cheltenham Festival winners (4) ==
- Centenary Novices' Handicap Chase - (2) Ballyalton (2016), Mister Whitaker (2018)
- Fred Winter Juvenile Novices' Handicap Hurdle - (1) Hawk High (2014)
- Pertemps Final - (1) Doddiethegreat (2025)

== Major wins ==
(United Kingdom) Great Britain

- Ascot Chase - (1) Waiting Patiently (2018)
- Top Novices' Hurdle - (1) Cyrus Darius (2015)
