= 1998 Cheltenham Gold Cup =

The 1998 Cheltenham Gold Cup was a horse race which took place at Cheltenham on Thursday 19 March 1998. It was the 71st running of the Cheltenham Gold Cup, and it was won by Cool Dawn. The winner was ridden by Andrew Thornton and trained by Robert Alner. The pre-race favourite Dorans Pride finished third.

Cool Dawn's victory in the Gold Cup was the highlight of a progressive career, in which he had initially competed in minor point-to-point races and hunter chases.

== Race details ==
- Sponsor: Tote
- Winner's prize money: £148,962.00
- Going: Good
- Number of runners: 17
- Winner's time: 6m 39.5s

== Full result ==
	*	Horse	Age	Jockey	Trainer ^{†}	SP
1		Cool Dawn	10	Andrew Thornton	Robert Alner	25/1
2	1¾	Strong Promise	7	Norman Williamson	Geoff Hubbard	14/1
3	hd	Dorans Pride	9	Richard Dunwoody	Michael Hourigan (IRE)	9/4 fav
4	14	Senor El Betrutti	9	Carl Llewellyn	Susan Nock	33/1
5	3	Suny Bay	9	Graham Bradley	Charlie Brooks	9/1
6	4	Simply Dashing	7	Lorcan Wyer	Tim Easterby	33/1
7	1¼	Challenger du Luc	8	Chris Maude	Martin Pipe	20/1
8	2	Barton Bank	12	Adrian Maguire	David Nicholson	33/1
9	hd	Strath Royal	12	Martin Brennan	Owen Brennan	100/1
10	30	Yorkshire Gale	12	Leighton Aspell	Josh Gifford	100/1
11	6	Go Ballistic	9	Conor O'Dwyer	John O'Shea	12/1
PU	Fence 22	Couldn't Be Better	11	Dean Gallagher	Charlie Brooks	33/1
PU	Fence 19	Addington Boy	10	Brian Harding	Gordon W. Richards	12/1
Fell	Fence 17	Rough Quest	12	Mick Fitzgerald	Terry Casey	14/1
PU	Fence 7	Cyborgo	8	Tony McCoy	Martin Pipe	10/1
CO	Fence 7	Indian Tracker	8	Jonothan Lower	Martin Pipe	150/1
CO	Fence 7	See More Business	8	Timmy Murphy	Paul Nicholls	11/2

* The distances between the horses are shown in lengths or shorter. hd = head; PU = pulled-up; CO = carried out.
† Trainers are based in Great Britain unless indicated.

== Winner's details ==
Further details of the winner, Cool Dawn:

- Foaled: May 11, 1988, in Ireland
- Sire: Over the River; Dam: Aran Tour (Arapaho)
- Owner: Dido Harding
- Breeder: John C. McCarthy
