= Ascot Silver Cup =

Steeplechase horse race in Britain

Ascot Silver Cup
2021
Annsam	Phoenix Way	Jerrysback

Previous years
2020
Mister Malarky	The Conditional	Regal Encore
2019
Regal Encore	Acting Lass	Jerrysback
2018
Valtor	Jammin Masters	Benatar
2017
Gold Present	Frodon	Walk In The Mill
2016
Regal Encore	Minella Daddy	Tenor Nivernais
2015
Wakanda	Virak	Fingal Bay
2014
The Young Master	Houblon Des Obeaux	Le Reve
2013
Houblon Des Obeaux	Cedre Bleu	What A Warrior
2012
Wyck Hill	Katenko	Roberto Goldback
2011
The Minack	Vino Griego	Reve De Sivola

2010-2001
2008
Niche Market	Monkerhostin	Alderburn
2007
Vodka Bleu	Madison Du Berlais	Alderburn
2006
Billyvoddan	Zabenz	Graphic Approach
2004
Spring Grove	Prominent Profile	Mondial Jack
2003
Horus	Behrajan	Dear Deal
2002
Behrajan	Exit To Wave	Zafarabad
2001
Shooting Light	Siberian Gale	You're Agoodun

2000-1993
2000
Legal Right	Royal Predica	Smarty
1999
Tresor De Mai	Spendid	Sounds Like Fun
1998
Torduff Express	Callisoe Bay	King Lucifer
1997
Cool Dawn	Harwell Lad	Call It A Day
1996
Go Ballistic	Unguided Missile	Major Bell
1995
Unguided Missile	Rough Quest	Unholy Alliance
1994
Raymylette	Dubacilla	Lord Relic
1993
Young Hustler	Latent Talent	Fighting Words

The Ascot Silver Cup, currently known for sponsorship purposes as the Howden Silver Cup, is a Premier Handicap National Hunt race in Great Britain. It is a handicap steeplechase. It is run at Ascot Racecourse, over a distance of about 3 miles (2 miles 7 furlongs and 180 yards, or 4,791 metres) and during its running there 20 fences to be jumped. The race is scheduled to take place in December.

The race was first run in 1965 and was sponsored by Scaffolding Great Britain and known as the SGB Chase until 1992. It was then known as the Betterware Cup between 1993 and 1998 inclusive.

The race has been known as the Silver Cup Handicap Chase with various sponsors since 1999, but now lacks the prestige of its earlier days. It was re-classified as a Premier Handicap in 2022 when Listed status was removed from handicap races.

== Records ==
Most successful horse (2 wins):

- Door Latch – 1985, 1986
- Regal Encore – 2016, 2019
- Victtorino - 2023, 2024

Leading jockey (3 wins):

- Tony McCoy - Go Ballistic (1996), Tresor De Mai (1999), Shooting Light (2001)

Leading trainer (4 wins):

- Josh Gifford – Henry Bishop (1980), Door Latch (1985, 1986), Ballyhane (1988)
- Nicky Henderson - Raffi Nelson (1979), Raymylette (1994), Gold Present (2017), Valtor (2018)

== Winners ==
Year	Winner	Age	Weight	Jockey	Trainer
1965	Vultrix	7	12-01	Stan Mellor	Frank Cundell
1966	Arkle	9	12-07	Pat Taaffe	Tom Dreaper
1967	Abandoned due to foot-and-mouth restrictions
1968	Abandoned due to waterlogging
1969	Straight Fort	6	12-00	Pat Taaffe	Tom Dreaper
1970	Glencaraig Lady	6	11–13	Bobby Coonan	Francis Flood
1971	Spanish Steps	8	12-01	Bill Smith	Edward Courage
1972	Soloning	7	10–12	Richard Pitman	Fred Winter
1973	Mocharabuice	10	10-06	Graham Thorner	Tim Forster
1974	Rough House	8	10-07	John Burke	Fred Rimell
1975	What A Buck	8	10-04	Jeff King	David Nicholson
1976	Abandoned due to frost
1977	Midnight Court	6	12-00	John Francome	Fred Winter
1978	Grand Canyon	8	11-01	Ron Barry	Derek Kent
1979	Raffi Nelson	6	10-01	Steve Smith Eccles	Nicky Henderson
1980	Henry Bishop	7	11-00	Bob Champion	Josh Gifford
1981	Abandoned due to snow
1982	Captain John	8	11–13	Robert Earnshaw	Michael Dickinson
1983	The Mighty Mac	8	11-10	Dermot Browne (Note: amateur jockey)	Michael Dickinson
1984	Canny Danny	8	11-08	Mark Dwyer	Jimmy FitzGerald
1985	Door Latch	7	10-02	Richard Rowe	Josh Gifford
1986	Door Latch	8	11-01	Richard Rowe	Josh Gifford
1987	Cavvies Clown	7	10–11	Ross Arnott	David Elsworth
1988	Ballyhane	7	10-04	Peter Hobbs	Josh Gifford
1989	Solidasarock	7	10-00	Luke Harvey	Reg Akehurst
1990	Man O'Magic	9	11-10	Mark Perrett	Kim Bailey
1991	Abandoned due to frost
1992	Captain Dibble	7	10-01	Carl Llewellyn	Nigel Twiston-Davies
1993	Young Hustler	6	11-10	Carl Llewellyn	Nigel Twiston-Davies
1994	Raymylette	7	09-13	Mick Fitzgerald	Nicky Henderson
1995	Unguided Missile	7	10-08	Richard Dunwoody	Gordon W. Richards
1996	Go Ballistic	7	10-00	Tony McCoy	John O'Shea
1997	Cool Dawn	9	10-05	Andrew Thornton	Robert Alner
1998	Torduff Express	7	10-00	Norman Williamson	Paul Nicholls
1999	Tresor De Mai	5	11-01	Tony McCoy	Martin Pipe
2000	Legal Right	7	12-00	Norman Williamson	Jonjo O'Neill
2001	Shooting Light	8	11-06	Tony McCoy	Martin Pipe
2002	Behrajan	7	11–12	Richard Johnson	Henry Daly
2003	Horus	8	10-04	Jamie Moore	Martin Pipe
2004 (Note: Due to the closure of Ascot Racecourse for redevelopment, the race was switched to Windsor in 2004)	Spring Grove	9	10–11	Andrew Thornton	Robert Alner
2005	Abandoned due to frost (Note: The race (to be held at Windsor) was abandoned in 2005 due to frost)
2006	Billyvoddan	7	10–12	Leighton Aspell	Henry Daly
2007	Vodka Bleu	8	10-03	Timmy Murphy	David Pipe
2008	Niche Market	7	10-00	Harry Skelton	Bob Buckler
2009	Abandoned due to snow
2010	Abandoned due to snow
2011	The Minack	7	11-01	Ruby Walsh	Paul Nicholls
2012	Wyck Hill	8	10-00	Tom Scudamore	David Bridgwater
2013	Houblon Des Obeaux	6	11-06	Aidan Coleman	Venetia Williams
2014	The Young Master	5	10-09	Barry Geraghty	Neil Mulholland
2015	Wakanda	6	11-05	Danny Cook	Sue Smith
2016	Regal Encore	8	11-11	Barry Geraghty	Anthony Honeyball
2017	Gold Present	7	11-03	Nico de Boinville	Nicky Henderson
2018	Valtor	9	11-03	James Bowen	Nicky Henderson
2019	Regal Encore	11	10-07	Richie McLernon	Anthony Honeyball
2020	Mister Malarky	7	11-05	Harry Cobden	Colin Tizzard
2021	Annsam	6	10-10	Adam Wedge	Evan Williams
2022	Abandoned due to frost
2023	Victtorino	5	12-00	Charlie Deutsch	Venetia Williams
2024	Victtorino	6	11-02	Charlie Deutsch	Venetia Williams
2025	Deep Cave	7	10-13	Jack Tudor	Christian Williams

== See also ==
- Horse racing in Great Britain
- List of British National Hunt races
