= Cool Dawn =

Irish racehorse

- Racing silks of Dido Harding
- Sire: Over The River (FR)
- Grandsire: Luthier
- Dam: Aran Tour
- Damsire: Arapaho
- Sex: Gelding
- Foaled: 11 May 1988
- Country: Ireland
- Colour: Bay
- Breeder: John C. McCarthy
- Owner: The Hon Dido Harding
- Trainer: Robert Alner
- Record: 17: 6-2-2
- Earnings: £216,794

Major wins
- Betterware Cup (1997); Cheltenham Gold Cup (1998)

Cool Dawn (11 May 1988 – 25 March 2018) was a National Hunt chaser of the 1990s who went from winning minor Point-to-Point races to winning the 1998 Cheltenham Gold Cup, the Blue Riband of National Hunt Racing.

== Racing career ==
=== Early career ===
His racing career began in an Irish Point-to-Point at Kilossera on 24 January 1993 where he finished 6th out of 14. After a further four races he was sold to Dido Harding to run in point-to-points in England. Cool Dawn started his English career with a win in a maiden at Badbury Rings. He subsequently had a second, first, and a ran out.

Two further point-to-point wins (including a Ladies Open) preceded his debut on a professional racecourse during the 1994/95 season in a novice Hunter Chases when he came second at Folkestone. After a further point-to-point win he won his first Hunter Chase at Ascot (6/5f), but followed that win with an unseated with the race at his mercy at Warwick (2/11f). His performances during this season clearly established him as a top class point-to-pointer and hunter chaser.

His target during the 1995/96 season was the Foxhunter at Cheltenham. He was moved to Robert Alner's professional yard for his Hunter Chase campaign. After a good win at Kempton (7/2), beating the useful Teaplanter, he ran well in the Foxhunter (7/2) coming second to the Enda Bolger ridden favourite, Elegant Lord. He then returned to Ireland and, ridden by Conor O’Dwyer, came third in the Irish Grand National behind Feathered Gale.

In the 1996/97 season it was decided to go for a professional campaign. However, he only had one outing, finishing fourth of five in a handicap at Sandown, before his season was curtailed by injury.

=== 1997/98 season ===
This season was Cool Dawn's annus mirabilis. After an undistinguished reappearance at Wincanton in the Badger Beer Handicap Chase, his owner-rider handed over the reins to a professional jockey, Andrew Thornton, who rode him for the rest of the season. His next three outings, all at Ascot, all resulted in wins, the Gardner Merchant Handicap Chase by 6l (from 4 lb out of the handicap)(4/1), the Betterware Cup by 9l (carrying 10-5)(5/2f), and the Ok Soil Remediation Ltd Handicap Chase by 2l (carrying 12-0)(10-11f). His final outing before the Gold Cup, at Sandown in the Agfa Diamond Chase, was rather an anti-climax as he was pulled up before 3 out. However, ignoring that run, in which it turned out that he had pulled some muscles in his back, he went to Cheltenham with a good outsider’s chance of a place at least.

Cool Dawn returned to Cheltenham to the same course and distance as his second in the Foxhunter two years earlier and put up the best performance of his career. There was early drama at the seventh fence when Cyborgo was pulled up lame and carried out See More Business, the 1997 King George winner, and Indian Tracker. However, Cool Dawn (a 25/1 outsider) was never troubled by this as he led from start to finish being briefly challenged by Strong Promise at the final fence before storming up the hill to win by 1¾l from Strong Promise with the favourite Dorans Pride a further head behind.

As the weights for the Whitbread Gold Cup at Sandown had already been published by the time of his Gold Cup win, he was well in at the weights and it seemed too good a chance to miss. However, after being sent off the 5/1f and leading for the first couple of miles, it was case of going to the well once too often and he was pulled up 2 out when well behind.

=== 1998/99 season ===
In his first outing of the season at Wincanton he was pulled up. However, before the race he had reared over in the paddock falling over onto his jockey, this time his owner-rider, and was probably feeling the effects of this. It is probable that he actually injured himself slightly more seriously than thought as Cool Dawn never fully recovered his form. His final two races were at the two tracks where he had shown his best form. At Ascot he finished third of four and in his final start at Cheltenham he was pulled up.

== Post race career ==
Following his retirement from racing, Cool Dawn continued to hunt regularly with the Weston and Banwell Harriers, and also paraded at a large number of events as a former Gold Cup winner.

After spending retirement hunting and grazing in Winscombe at Dido Harding’s family home Cool Dawn was euthanised on 25 March 2018.
