= Charlie Hall Chase =

Steeplechase horse race in Britain

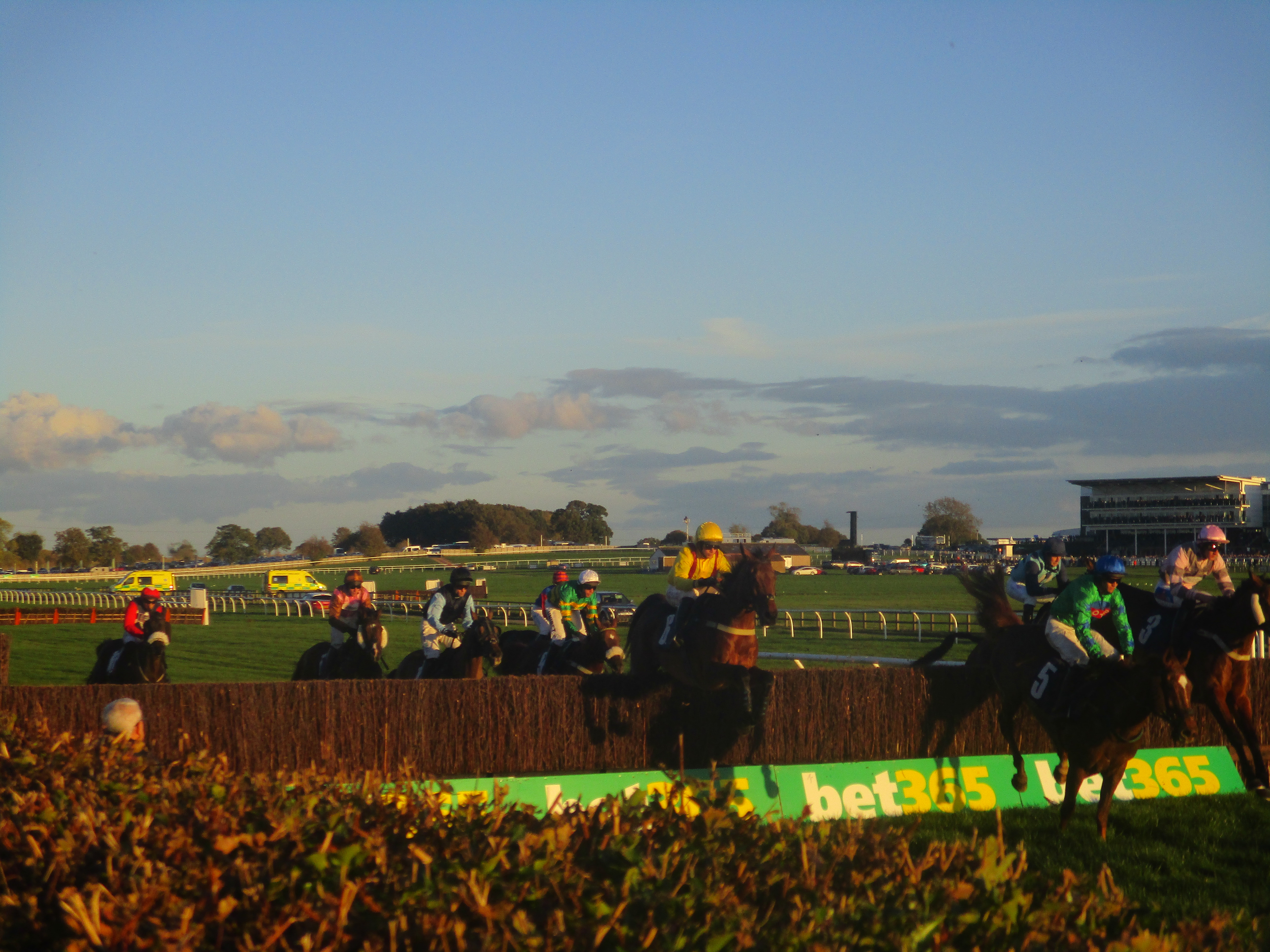
- 2021 Charlie Hall Chase
- Class: Grade 2
- Location: Wetherby Racecourse; Wetherby, England
- Inaugurated: 1969
- Race type: steeplechase
- Sponsor: Bet365
- Website: Wetherby

Race information
- Distance: 3m (5,029 metres)
- Surface: Turf
- Track: Left-handed
- Qualification: Five-years-old and up
- Weight: 11 st 4 lb Allowances; 7 lb for mares Penalties for wins 6 lb for Grade 1 or Grade 2 chase * 4 lb for Premier Hcap / G3 or Listed chase * since 30 Sep last year (halved for novice and beginners chases)
- Purse: £100,000 (2025); 1st: £56,950

Charlie Hall Chase
2026
Pic D'Orhy	Handstands	Riskintheground

Previous years
2025
Djelo	Pic D'Orhy	Ga Law
2024
The Real Whacker	Bravemansgame	Sam Brown
2023
Gentlemansgame	Bravemansgame	Midnight River
2022
Bravemansgame	Eldorado Allen	Sam Brown
2021
Fusil Raffles	Kitty's Light	Clondaw Castle

2020-2011
2020
Cyrname	Vinndication	Aye Right
2019
Ballyoptic	Elegant Escape	Aso
2018
Definitly Red	Black Corton	Virgilio
2017
Bristol De Mai	Blaklion	Definitly Red
2016
Irish Cavalier	Menorah	Cue Card
2015
Cue Card	Dynaste	Ballynagour
2014
Menorah	Taquin Du Seuil	Double Ross
2013
Harry Topper	Wayward Prince	Unioniste
2012
Silviniaco Conti	Wayward Prince	Midnight Chase
2011
Weird Al	Time For Rupert	Chicago Grey

2010-2001
2010
Nacarat	The Tother One	Deep Purple
2009
Deep Purple	Tamarinbleu	Ollie Magern
2008
State of Play	Ollie Magern	Snoopy Loopy
2007
Ollie Magern	State of Play	Monkerhostin
2006
Our Vic	Neptune Collonges	Sir Rembrandt
2005
Ollie Magern	Kingscliff	Take The Stand
2004
Grey Abbey	Sir Rembrandt	Royal Emperor
2003
Ballybough Rasher	Marlborough	Barrow Drive
2002
Marlborough	Hussard Collonges	Gingembre
2001
Sackville	Sleeping Night	Shotgun Willy

2000-1991
2000
See More Business	Bobby Grant	Young Kenny
1999
See More Business	Simply Dashing	Looks Like Trouble
1998
Strath Royal	Boss Doyle	Simply Dashing
1997
One Man	Barton Bank	Hermes Harvest
1996
One Man	Barton Bank	Young Hustler
1995
Barton Bank	Young Hustler	Over The Deel
1994
Young Hustler	Run For Free	Black Humour
1993
Barton Bank	Cab On Target	Garrison Savannah
1992
Tipping Tim	Pat's Jester	Ida's Delight
1991
Celtic Shot	Docklands Express	Killbanon

1990-1988
1990
Celtic Shot	Kildimo	Old Applejack
1989
Durham Edition	Ballyhane	Yahoo
1988
High Edge Grey	Yahoo	Handy Trick

The Charlie Hall Chase is a Grade 2 National Hunt steeplechase in England which is open to horses aged five years or older. It is run at Wetherby over a distance of about 3 miles (3 miles and 45 yards, or 4,869 metres), with 19 fences. The race is scheduled to take place each year in late October or early November.

The event was established in 1969, and it was originally called the Wetherby Pattern Chase. It replaced the Emblem Handicap Chase, a handicap named after Emblem, the winner of the Grand National in 1863.

The race became known as the Charlie Hall Memorial Wetherby Pattern Chase in 1978, in memory of the trainer Charlie Hall. This was shortened to the present title in 1990.

The Charlie Hall Chase has been sponsored by Bet365 since 2003.

== Records ==
Most successful horse (2 wins):

- Wayward Lad – 1983, 1985
- Celtic Shot – 1990, 1991
- Barton Bank – 1993, 1995
- One Man – 1996, 1997
- See More Business – 1999, 2000
- Ollie Magern – 2005, 2007

Leading jockey (3 wins):

- Graham Bradley – Righthand Man (1982), Wayward Lad (1985), Celtic Shot (1991)
- Carl Llewellyn – Tipping Tim (1992), Young Hustler (1994), Ollie Magern (2005)
- Mick Fitzgerald – See More Business (1999, 2000), Marlborough (2002)

Leading trainer (6 wins):

- Nigel Twiston-Davies – Tipping Tim (1992), Young Hustler (1994), Ollie Magern (2005, 2007), Bristol de Mai (2017), Ballyoptic (2019)

== Winners ==
Year	Winner	Age	Jockey	Trainer
1969	Arcturus	8	Pat Buckley	Neville Crump
1970	Kildrummy	5	Ron Barry	Wilf Crawford
1971	Abandoned due to frost and snow
1972	Coxswain	7	Mr G Macmillan	Arthur Stephenson
1973	Dunrobin	6	Stephen P Taylor	Wilf Crawford
1974	Tamalin	7	Jonjo O'Neill	Gordon W. Richards
1975	Davy Lad	5	Dessie Hughes	Mick O'Toole
1976 (dh)	Current Gold; Set Point	5; 8	David Goulding; Tommy Stack	Gordon W. Richards; Lady Herries
1977	Goolagong	7	Mr H Orde-Howlett	Neville Crump
1978	Fighting Fit	6	Ridley Lamb	Ken Oliver
1979	Sparkie's Choice	6	Colin Hawkins	Neville Crump
1980	Manton Castle	6	Gordon Holmes	Maurice Camacho
1981	Gay Return	6	Tommy Ryan	Edward O'Grady
1982	Righthand Man	5	Graham Bradley	Michael Dickinson
1983	Wayward Lad	8	Robert Earnshaw	Michael Dickinson
1984	Burrough Hill Lad	8	Phil Tuck	Jenny Pitman
1985	Wayward Lad	10	Graham Bradley	Monica Dickinson
1986	Forgive 'n Forget	9	Mark Dwyer	Jimmy FitzGerald
1987	Cybrandian	9	Chris Grant	Peter Easterby
1988	High Edge Grey	7	Tim Reed	Ken Oliver
1989	Durham Edition	11	Alan Merrigan	Arthur Stephenson
1990	Celtic Shot	8	Peter Scudamore	Charlie Brooks
1991	Celtic Shot	9	Graham Bradley	Charlie Brooks
1992	Tipping Tim	7	Carl Llewellyn	Nigel Twiston-Davies
1993	Barton Bank	7	Adrian Maguire	David Nicholson
1994	Young Hustler	7	Carl Llewellyn	Nigel Twiston-Davies
1995	Barton Bank	9	Adrian Maguire	David Nicholson
1996	One Man	8	Richard Dunwoody	Gordon W. Richards
1997	One Man	9	Richard Dunwoody	Gordon W. Richards
1998	Strath Royal	12	Martin Brennan	Owen Brennan
1999	See More Business	9	Mick Fitzgerald	Paul Nicholls
2000	See More Business	10	Mick Fitzgerald	Paul Nicholls
2001	Sackville	9	David Casey	Frances Crowley
2002	Marlborough	10	Mick Fitzgerald	Nicky Henderson
2003	Ballybough Rasher	8	Graham Lee	Howard Johnson
2004	Grey Abbey	10	Graham Lee	Howard Johnson
2005	Ollie Magern	7	Carl Llewellyn	Nigel Twiston-Davies
2006	Our Vic	8	Timmy Murphy	David Pipe
2007	Ollie Magern	9	Paddy Brennan	Nigel Twiston-Davies
2008	State of Play	8	Paul Moloney	Evan Williams
2009	Deep Purple	8	Paul Moloney	Evan Williams
2010	Nacarat	9	Sam Thomas	Tom George
2011	Weird Al	8	Timmy Murphy	Donald McCain, Jr.
2012	Silviniaco Conti	6	Ruby Walsh	Paul Nicholls
2013	Harry Topper	6	Jason Maguire	Kim Bailey
2014	Menorah	9	Richard Johnson	Philip Hobbs
2015	Cue Card	9	Paddy Brennan	Colin Tizzard
2016	Irish Cavalier	7	Jonathan Moore	Rebecca Curtis
2017	Bristol De Mai	6	Daryl Jacob	Nigel Twiston-Davies
2018	Definitly Red	9	Danny Cook	Brian Ellison
2019	Ballyoptic	9	Sam Twiston-Davies	Nigel Twiston-Davies
2020	Cyrname	8	Harry Cobden	Paul Nicholls
2021	Fusil Raffles	6	Daryl Jacob	Nicky Henderson
2022	Bravemansgame	7	Harry Cobden	Paul Nicholls
2023	Gentlemansgame	7	Darragh O'Keeffe	Mouse Morris
2024	The Real Whacker	8	Brian Hughes	Patrick Neville
2025	Djelo	7	Charlie Deutsch	Venetia Williams
2026	Pic d'Orhy	11	Harry Skelton	Dan Skelton

== See also ==
- Horse racing in Great Britain
- List of British National Hunt races
- Recurring events established in 1969 – this race is included under its original title, Wetherby Pattern Chase.
