= Lucius (horse) =

British-bred thoroughbred racehorse

- Sire: Perhapsburg
- Dam: Matches
- Sex: Gelding
- Foaled: 1969
- Country: United Kingdom
- Colour: Bay
- Owner: Fiona Whitaker
- Trainer: Gordon W. Richards

Major wins
- Grand National (1978)

Lucius (foaled 1969) was a British-bred Thoroughbred racehorse who competed in National Hunt racing. He is best known for winning the 1978 Grand National.

== Background ==
Lucius was sired by Perhapsburg out of Matches. In 1972 he was bought by Fiona Whitaker, who had him trained by Gordon W. Richards.

== Racing career ==
Lucius entered the 1978 Grand National as a 14/1 chance. His regular jockey David Goulding suffered an injury prior to the race so Bob Davies was brought in as a last minute replacement.

Davies had never ridden Lucius before so raced cautiously and managed to win a very close race. This proved to be Lucius's last ever race. He was retired the next season and died in his sleep at the age of twenty seven.

== Grand National record ==
Grand National	Position	Jockey	Age	Weight	SP	Distance
1978	1st	Bob Davies	9	10-9	14/1	
