= Winter Novices' Hurdle =

Hurdle horse race in Britain

Winter Novices' Hurdle
2025
No Drama This End	The Blue Room	Top Jimmy

Previous years
2024
Bill Joyce	Quebecois	Pony Soprano
2023
Deafening Silence	Insurrection	Personal Ambition
2022
Henri The Second	Henry's Friend	Maximilian
2021
Lossiemouth	Viva Lavilla	Brave Kingdom

2020-2011
2020
Star Gate	Valleres	Sending Love
2019
Enrilo	House Island	Happygolucky
2018
Alsa Mix	Darlac	Mercy Mercy Me
2017
On The Blind Side	Springtown Lake	Red River
2016
Messire Des Obeaux	Ballyandy	Cultivator
2014
Vyta Du Roc	Shantou Bob	Tara Point
2013
Killala Quay	Beat That	Saint Roque
2012
Taquin Du Seuil	Le Bec	Southfield Theatre
2011
Fingal Bay	Simonsig	Barbatos

2010-2001
2009
Manyriverstocross	Like Minded	Vino Griego
2008
Junior	On Raglan Road	Ogee
2007
Lightning Strike	Mount Oscar	Nakai
2006
Labelthou	Granit Jack	Duncliffe
2005
Neptune Collonges	Massini's Maguire	No Guarantees
2004
Ladalko	No Refuge	Lady Zephyr
2003
Inglis Drever	Self Defense	Control Man
2002
Coolnagorna	Thisthatandtother	Self Defense
2001
Rouble	Sir D'Orton	One Knight

2000-1991
1999
What's Up Boys	Barney Knows	Gentle Rivage
1998
Barton	King's Road	Artadoin Lad
1997
Song of the Sword	Prospero	Fujiyama Crest
1996
Yahmi	Jack Tanner	Eulogy
1995
See More Business	Father Sky	Eulogy
1994
Roberty Lea	King Lucifer	Call My Guest
1993
Top Spin	Scobie Boy	Mad Thyme
1992
Glen Lochan	Gaelstrom	Now Your Talkin
1991
Arabian Sultan	Keep Out Of Debt	Golden Arctic

1990-1987
1990
Tyrone Bridge	Yellow Spring	Moze Tidy
1988
Man On The Line	Serious Man	Kittinger
1987
Slalom	Sir's At The Gin	Black Monkey

The Winter Novices' Hurdle is a Grade 2 National Hunt hurdle race in Great Britain which is open to horses aged four years or older. It is run at Sandown Park over a distance of about 2 miles and 4 furlongs (2 miles, 3 furlongs and 173 yards, or 3,980 metres), and during its running there are nine hurdles to be jumped. The race is for novice hurdlers, and it is scheduled to take place each year in early December.

Between 1992 and 1999 the distance of the race was 2 miles and 6 furlongs, and prior to 1992 it was run over 2 miles 5 furlongs and 75 yards. The only winner to subsequently win the championship event in this division is Barton, who won the 1999 Royal & SunAlliance Novices' Hurdle. From 2011 to 2016 the race was sponsored by Neptune Investment Management and run under the title of the Neptune Investment Management Novices' Hurdle. It was sponsored by the Ballymore Group from 2017 to 2022, and by Betfair since 2023.

== Records ==
Leading jockey since 1983 (3 wins):

- Tony McCoy – See More Business (1995), Lightning Strike (2007), Taquin de Seuil (2012)
- Richard Johnson - What's Up Boys (1999), Fingal Bay (2011), Killala Quay (2013)
- Wayne Hutchinson - Manyriverstocross (2009), Label Des Obeaux (2015), Alsa Mix (2018)
- Harry Cobden - Enrilo (2019), Henri the Second (2022), No Drama This End (2025)

Leading trainer since 1983 (6 wins):

- Paul Nicholls - See More Business (1995), Ladalko (2004), Neptune Collonges (2005), Enrilo (2019), Henri the Second (2022), No Drama This End (2025)

== Winners since 1983 ==
Year	Winner	Age	Jockey	Trainer
1983	Catch Phrase	5	Richard Rowe	Josh Gifford
1984	Sutton Prince	6	Richard Linley	Fred Winter
1985	Oceanus	4	Chris Grant	Denys Smith
1986	Buckskin's Best	4	C Jones	Robin Dickin
1987	Slalom	6	John White	Michael Robinson
1988	Man on the Line	5	Peter Scudamore	Reg Akehurst
1989	Abandoned due to frost
1990	Tyrone Bridge	4	Richard Dunwoody	Martin Pipe
1991	Arabian Sultan	4	Peter Scudamore	Martin Pipe
1992	Glen Lochan	7	Jamie Osborne	Henrietta Knight
1993	Top Spin	4	Adrian Maguire	John Jenkins
1994	Roberty Lea	6	Peter Niven	Mary Reveley
1995	See More Business	5	Tony McCoy	Paul Nicholls
1996	Yahmi	6	Jamie Osborne	Jim Old
1997	Song of the Sword	4	Graham Bradley	Jim Old
1998	Barton	5	Lorcan Wyer	Tim Easterby
1999	What's Up Boys	5	Richard Johnson	Philip Hobbs
2000	Abandoned due to waterlogging
2001	Rouble	5	Leighton Aspell	Josh Gifford
2002	Coolnagorna	5	Tony Dobbin	Jonjo O'Neill
2003	Inglis Drever	4	Graham Lee	Howard Johnson
2004	Ladalko	5	Ruby Walsh	Paul Nicholls
2005	Neptune Collonges	4	Barry Geraghty	Paul Nicholls
2006	Labelthou	7	Barry Fenton	Emma Lavelle
2007	Lightning Strike	4	Tony McCoy	Venetia Williams
2008	Junior	5	Robert Thornton	Alan King
2009	Manyriverstocross	4	Wayne Hutchinson	Alan King
2010	Abandoned due to snow
2011	Fingal Bay	5	Richard Johnson	Philip Hobbs
2012	Taquin de Seuil	5	Tony McCoy	Jonjo O'Neill
2013	Killala Quay	6	Richard Johnson	Charlie Longsdon
2014	Vyta Du Roc	5	Barry Geraghty	Nicky Henderson
2015	Label Des Obeaux	4	Wayne Hutchinson	Alan King
2016	Messire Des Obeaux	4	Daryl Jacob	Alan King
2017	On The Blind Side	5	Nico de Boinville	Nicky Henderson
2018	Alsa Mix	6	Wayne Hutchinson	Alan King
2019	Enrilo	5	Harry Cobden	Paul Nicholls
2020	Star Gate	4	Nico de Boinville	Evan Williams
2021	Lossiemouth	6	Stan Sheppard	Tom Lacey
2022	Henri the Second	5	Harry Cobden	Paul Nicholls
2023	Deafening Silence	6	Harry Skelton	Dan Skelton
2024	Bill Joyce	5	Jonjo O'Neill Jr	Jonjo O'Neill
2025	No Drama This End	5	Harry Cobden	Paul Nicholls

== See also ==
- Horse racing in Great Britain
- List of British National Hunt races
