= 1978 Grand National =

English steeplechase horse race

- Grand National
- Location: Aintree
- Date: 1 April 1978
- Winning horse: Lucius
- Starting price: 14/1
- Jockey: Bob Davies
- Trainer: (England) Gordon W. Richards
- Owner: Fiona Whitaker
- Conditions: Good

External videos
- The 1978 Grand National in full BBC
- The 1978 Grand National British Movietone

There coming to the elbow now with just over a furlong to run, and it's Lucius and Bob Davies now just taking a fresh advantage, The Pilgarlic running fast on the far side but it's Lucius from Sebastian as they race into the closing stages, Lucius from Sebastian with Drumroan putting in a tremendous finish, but at the line, Lucius wins the National!

— Commentator Peter O'Sullevan describes the climax of the 1978 National

The 1978 Grand National (officially known as The Sun Grand National for sponsorship reasons) was the 132nd renewal of the Grand National horse race that took place at Aintree near Liverpool, England, on 1 April 1978. In a close finish between the leading five horses, the winner was Lucius, by about half a length.

Three times winner Red Rum was declared out of the race due to injury, but was allowed to lead the post parade.

== Finishing order ==
Position	Name	Jockey	Age	Handicap (st-lb)	SP	Distance
01	Lucius	Bob Davies	9	10-9	14/1	
02	Sebastian V	Ridley Lamb	10	10-1	25/1	
03	Drumroan	Gerry Newman	10	10-0	50/1	
04	Coolishall	Martin O'Halloran	9	10-0	16/1	
05	The Pilgarlic	Richard Evans	10	10-1	33/1	
06	Mickley Seabright	Peter Brookshaw	10	10-3	33/1	
07	Lord Browndodd	John Francome	10	10-7	16/1	
08	The Songwriter	Bryan Smart	9	10-0	50/1	
09	Roman Bar	Pat Kiely	9	10-8	33/1	
10	Brown Admiral	John Burke	9	10-0	33/1	
11	Golden Whin	Steve Holland	8	10-4	50/1	
12	Tamalin	Graham Thorner	11	11-2	25/1	
13	Lean Forward	James Evans	12	10-0	33/1	
14	Nereo	Mark Floyd	12	10-0	66/1	
15	Never Rock	Kevin Mooney	9	10-0	50/1	

== Non-finishers ==
Fence	Name	Jockey	Age	Handicap (st-lb)	Starting price	Fate
01	Cornish Princess	Richard Hoare	10	10-1	66/1	Fell
01	Otter Way	Jeff King	10	10-10	16/1	Fell
01	Teddy Bear II	Philip Blacker	11	10-4	50/1	Fell
02	Hidden Value	Tommy Stack	10	10-0	25/1	Fell
03	War Bonnet	Dessie Hughes	10	10-8	50/1	Fell
04	Sadale VI	Clive Candy	11	10-1	66/1	Fell
06	Gleaming Rain	Sean Treacy	10	10-0	25/1	Fell
06	Henry Hall	Frank Berry	9	10-0	66/1	Fell
06	Tied Cottage	Tommy Carberry	10	11-4	9/1	Fell
08	Irish Tony	Dennis Atkins	10	10-0	33/1	Fell
08	Master H	Reg Crank	9	11-2	10/1	Saddle slipped
10	Double Negative	Colin Tinkler	8	10-0	33/1	Fell
10	Shifting Gold	Bob Champion	9	11-6	16/1	Fell
10	So	Niall Madden	9	10-4	14/1	Fell
11	Burrator	John Suthern	9	10-0	66/1	Fell
11	Master Upham	Paul Barton	10	10-0	25/1	Fell
11	Silkstone	Glenn Graham	10	10-0	66/1	Fell
13	Double Bridal	Bill Smith	7	10-1	50/1	Fell
15	Churchtown Boy	Martin Blackshaw	11	10-0	14/1	Fell
19	April Seventh	Andy Turnell	12	10-11	20/1	Refused
21	Rag Trade	Jonjo O'Neill	12	11-3	8/1 F	Pulled Up
22	Harban	Joe Byrne	9	10-0	66/1	Unseated Rider

== Media coverage and aftermath ==
David Coleman was back presenting the special edition of Grandstand after missing the previous year's broadcast. The 1976 winner Rag Trade pulled up lame before the 22nd fence and was later euthanized.
