= One Man (horse) =

British-bred Thoroughbred racehorse

- Racing silks of John Hales
- Sire: Remainder Man
- Dam: Steal On
- Damsire: General Ironside
- Sex: Gelding
- Foaled: 1988
- Country: Ireland
- Colour: Grey
- Breeder: Hugh J Holohan
- Owner: John Hales
- Trainer: Gordon W Richards
- Record: 35: 20-3-2
- Earnings: £456,619

Major wins
- Reynoldstown Novices' Chase (1994); Hennessy Gold Cup (1994); Tommy Whittle Chase (1995); King George VI Chase (1995, 1996); Charlie Hall Chase (1996, 1997); Pillar Properties Chase (1997); Peterborough Chase (1997); Ascot Chase (1998); Queen Mother Champion Chase (1998)

One Man (1988 – 3 April 1998) was an Irish-bred National Hunt steeplechase racehorse sired by Remainder Man out of the mare Steal On. The popular grey won 20 of 35 races, including the Queen Mother Champion Chase in 1998. He was trained by the late Gordon W. Richards and owned by John Hales. Renowned for his jumping ability and high cruising speed, he was nicknamed his "little bouncing ball" by Richards and was adopted by many as the new Desert Orchid. One Man received a Timeform rating of 179, an outstanding figure.

== Early career ==
Bought for 4,000 Irish guineas as an unraced three-year-old in Ireland, One Man first raced over hurdles and won three races from nine starts. He was then sold for 68,000 guineas to John Hales in May 1993; Hales had gone to the sale with a limit of 7,000 guineas, spending far more than he anticipated.

== 1993–1994 season ==
One Man was switched to steeplechasing and won his first five Novices' Chase races before his first race at the Cheltenham Festival in March 1994. Despite being the 3-1 favourite for the Sun Alliance Chase, he finished ninth behind Monsieur Le Cure.

== 1994–1995 season ==
One Man's next season began with victories in the Tennents Special Chase at Ayr and the Hennessy Cognac Gold Cup at Newbury before he unseated his rider in the Rowland Meyrick at Wetherby. This was followed by an uncharacteristic fall in the Racing Post Chase at Kempton, which ended his season.

== 1995–1996 season ==
A hat-trick of victories in the Motherwell Chase (at Ayr Racecourse), the Tommy Whittle Chase (at Haydock Park Racecourse) and the King George VI Chase (at Sandown) provided preparation for a shot at the Cheltenham Gold Cup in March 1996. One Man started the 1996 Gold Cup as the 11-8 favourite but finished sixth behind Imperial Call. He had travelled well throughout the race before weakening approaching the last fence. The conclusion of many was that he did not quite stay the three-mile, two-and-a-half-furlong trip, which ended with the gruelling hill finish at Cheltenham Racecourse. He had previously won over this distance at Newbury Racecourse; the pace of the Cheltenham Gold Cup is often more like a 2½-mile contest, however, and there is a greater emphasis on stamina.

== 1996–1997 season ==
The following season began with another hat trick; One Man took the Charlie Hall Chase (at Wetherby Racecourse), the King George VI Chase for a second time (at Kempton Park Racecourse) and the Pillar Chase at Cheltenham's January meeting. Despite finishing second to Strong Promise in the Comet Chase at Ascot Racecourse in February, One Man returned to Cheltenham in March 1997 for another attempt at the Gold Cup. Once again, however, despite apparently going well and moving close into second place after the next-to-last fence, One Man suddenly tired again before the last fence and was reduced to almost walking pace in the run-in, ultimately finishing sixth again (at odds of 7-1). This performance was followed by a trip to Aintree Racecourse for the Martell Cup, in which jockey Richard Dunwoody pulled up One Man after the horse burst a blood vessel in his nose.

== 1997–1998 season ==
One Man's 1997-98 season started with a victory over his old rival Barton Bank in the Charlie Hall Chase (at Wetherby), and a win in the Peterborough Chase (at Huntingdon Racecourse). Attention then turned to Kempton and One Man's bid to win the King George VI Chase for a third straight time and emulate Desert Orchid (who won the race in 1986 and three successive times from 1988-1990). However, One Man finished fifth in the Boxing Day spectacular this time around, with the race being won by the progressing See More Business. His connections were left to decide on One Man's target for the 1998 Cheltenham Festival. A third attempt at the Cheltenham Gold Cup was not to be considered; instead, a start in the two-mile Queen Mother Champion Chase was the favoured option. Before this, One Man returned to Ascot for the Comet Chase in February; this time, he finished ahead of Strong Promise.

In March 1998, One Man returned to Cheltenham. He started the Champion Chase at 7-2 odds and jumped well throughout; jockey Brian Harding took him clear at the final turn, where he once again faced the Cheltenham hill. However, this time the trip was right; he saw off his closest challengers Or Royal and Lord Dorcet with a blistering pace. One Man's Queen Mother Champion Chase victory is remembered as one of the most emotional Cheltenham festival victories of all time, as he was led towards the deafening cheers around the winners' enclosure by a tearful John Hales. Never before had a horse won both the King George and the Champion Chase.

Sixteen days later at Aintree, on 3 April 1998, One Man crashed through the ninth fence in the Melling Chase and landed in a heap. He did not seem to take off at the fence; one possibility is that he could have had a heart attack. He broke a hind tibia in the fall (a fatal injury in a racehorse) and was put down on the spot.

One Man was listed number 6 in a 2004 Racing Post readers' poll of their favourite race horses, with just three steeplechasers ahead of him (Arkle, Desert Orchid and Red Rum).
