= Ascot Racecourse =

Horse racing venue in Ascot, Berkshire, England

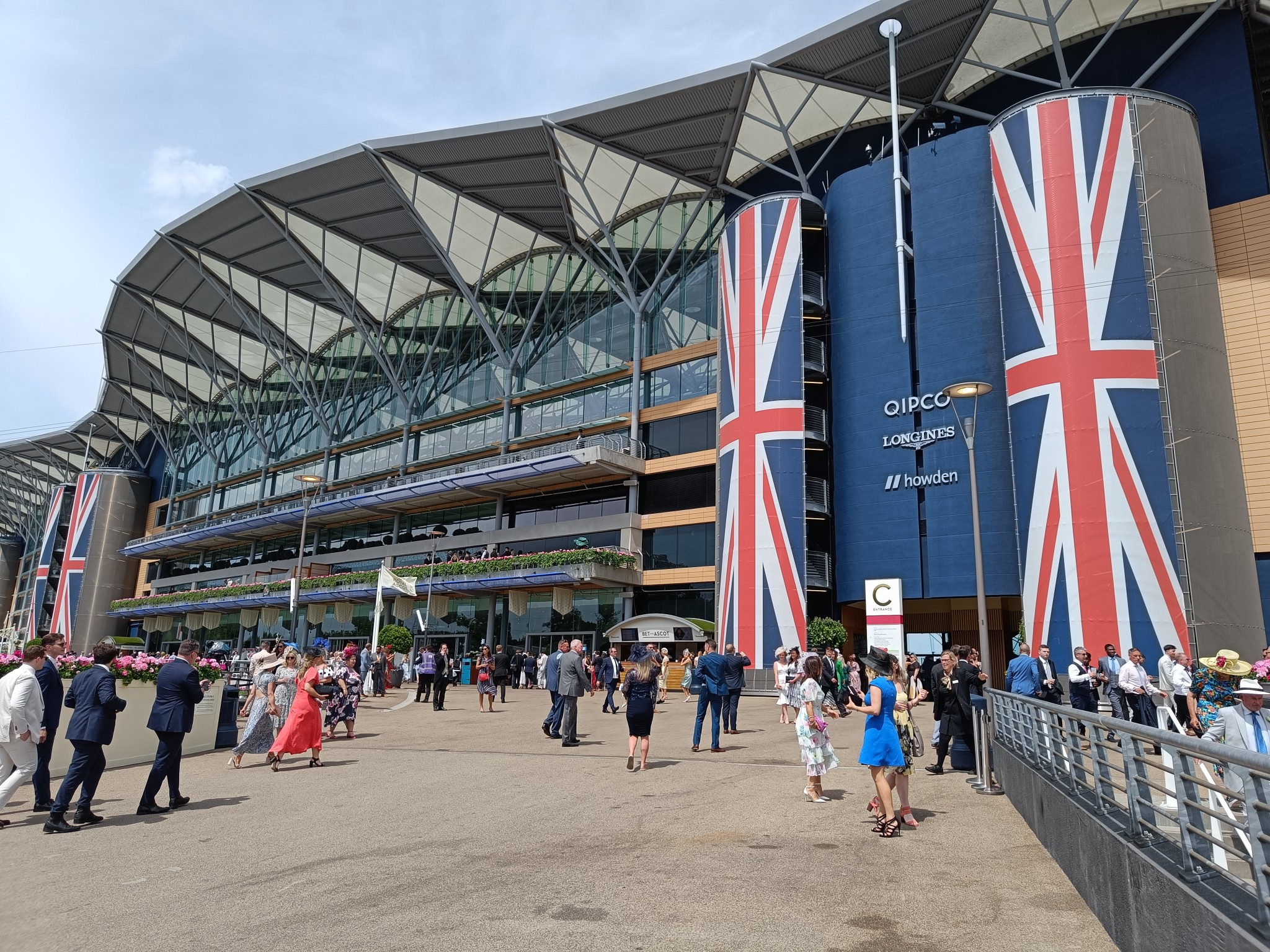
- Interactive map of Ascot Racecourse
- Location: Ascot, Berkshire, England
- Coordinates: 51°24′58″N 0°40′37″W
- Owned by: Ascot Racecourse Ltd
- Date opened: 11 August 1711; Grandstand builds: 1793; 1822; 1839; 1902; 1962; 20 June 2006
- Capacity: 80,000
- Course type: Flat; National Hunt
- Notable races: The Gold Cup
- Attendance: 600,000 (yearly)

Ascot Racecourse is a dual-purpose British racecourse, located in Ascot, Berkshire, England, about 25 miles west of London. Ascot is used for thoroughbred horse racing, and it hosts 13 of Britain's 36 annual Flat Group 1 races and three Grade 1 Jumps races. The racetrack's current grandstand was completed in 2006.

Ascot Racecourse is visited by approximately 600,000 people a year, accounting for 10% of all UK racegoers. The racecourse covers 179 acres (72 ha) leased from the Crown Estate, and enjoys close association with the British royal family. Ascot was founded in 1711 by Queen Anne and is about 6 miles (10 km) from Windsor Castle.

Royal stands have been in use at the sports venue since the late 18th century. The main grandstand has been demolished and rebuilt on many occasions. The first public grandstand was built in 1839 and has been redeveloped over the centuries. Queen Elizabeth II visited the racecourse quite frequently. The seating area was reconstructed in 1961 and named in her honour, but the stand was demolished and replaced from 2004.

Ascot currently stages 26 days of racing over the course of the year, comprising 18 flat meetings between April and October, and 8 jump meetings between October and March. The Royal Meeting, held in June each year, remains the highlight of the British summer social calendar attracting over 350,000 spectators for the week. The prestigious King George VI and Queen Elizabeth Stakes is run over the course in July.

== History ==
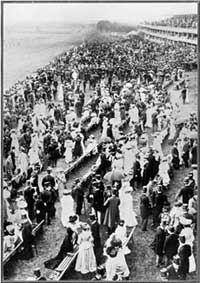
The Royal Enclosure on Cup Day, 1907

Over its 300-year history, Ascot has established itself as a national institution, with Royal Ascot being the centrepiece of the British summer social calendar.

The racecourse was founded in 1711 by Queen Anne. When out riding from Windsor Castle, she came upon an area of open heath that looked, in her words, 'ideal for horses to gallop at full stretch'. Her plans for a new race meeting were subsequently announced in The London Gazette of 12 July 1711.

Her Majesty's Plate of 100 guineas will be run for round the new heat on Ascott Common, near Windsor, on Tuesday, 7 August next, by any horse, mare or gelding, being no more than six years old the grass before, as must be certified under the hand of the breeder, carrying 12 St., three heats, to be entered the last day of July, at Mr. Hancock's, at Fern Hill, near the Starting Post.

That first meeting was held on 11 August 1711 (22 August New Style), the original date (and a race scheduled for 6 August) having been postponed for reasons unspecified, although it has been speculated that the course was simply not ready. The Queen and a "brilliant suite" drove from Windsor Castle to witness it, with the first race being a seven horse £50 plate, won by a horse called Doctor owned by the Duke of St Albans. The original racecourse was laid out by William Lowen for the first meet.

Queen Anne's gift to racing, founding the Royal Racecourse, is marked by the tradition of opening Royal Ascot with The Queen Anne Stakes run over the straight mile.

The first permanent building was not erected until 1793, and was built by local Windsor builder George Slingsby. Holding 1,650 people, it was used for almost fifty years. In 1813 an Act of Parliament ensured that the Ascot Heath would be kept and used as a racecourse for the public in the future. A new grandstand was opened in 1839 at a cost of £10,000.

Ascot Authority Act 1913
- Act of Parliament
- Parliament of the United Kingdom
- Long title: An Act to constitute the Trustees for the purpose of holding and managing Ascot Race Course and the stands buildings and property held or used in connection therewith and to vest in them all property now held or used for the benefit or purposes of Ascot Races and to confer all necessary powers on the Trustees so constituted and for other purposes.
- Citation: 3 & 4 Geo. 5. c. lxxxiv

Dates
- Royal assent: 15 August 1913

Text of statute as originally enacted

Ascot Race Course Act 1948
- Act of Parliament
- Parliament of the United Kingdom
- Long title: An Act to provide for the closing of part of Winkfield Road in the rural district of Windsor in the county of Berks during the Ascot races and for diverting a footpath and other purposes.
- Citation: 11 & 12 Geo. 6. c. xvii

Dates
- Royal assent: 30 June 1948

Text of statute as originally enacted

The administration of the Royal Racecourse is handled on behalf of the Crown by a representative appointed by the Monarch. Until 1901, the racecourse was managed by the Master of the Royal Buckhounds. Lord Churchill was appointed His Majesty's Representative in 1901, responsible for running the course and determining entrance to the Royal Enclosure. The Ascot Authority was established in 1913 by a further Act of Parliament, the Ascot Authority Act 1913 (3 & 4 Geo. 5. c. lxxxiv), with His Majesty's Representative becoming Senior Trustee. Today, as Ascot Authority (Holdings) Limited, Ascot has a formal board chaired by Sir Francis Brooke Bt. who also serves as His Majesty's Representative (Senior Trustee) at Ascot.

Between 1940 and 1943 there was no racing at Ascot. The racecourse was commandeered by the army, with the Grandstand providing accommodation for gunners of the Royal Artillery. Racing resumed on 15 May 1943 with an eight-race card. The first post-war fixture was held on 21 May 1945, when the 19-year-old Princess Elizabeth attended Ascot for the first time. The first National Hunt meeting was held at Ascot in 1965, the course having been established using turf from Hurst Park Racecourse, which closed in 1962.

As an owner and breeder of racehorses, Elizabeth took a keen interest in racing. The jockeys riding the queen's horses could be identified by the royal racing colours: purple body with gold braid, scarlet sleeves, and a black velvet cap with gold fringe. The Queen attended the annual Royal Meeting from her Coronation in 1953 to 2021, and traditionally presented The Gold Cup and The Diamond Jubilee Stakes each year. In 2013, The queen's filly, Estimate, won the Gold Cup – the first time it has been won by a reigning monarch.

== Grandstand redevelopments ==
=== 1793–1800s ===
Before the public stand for the seating of spectators was built, there was a Royal Stand and a betting stand. The Royal Stand was redeveloped from its original foundation in 1793 and replaced in 1822 when George IV commissioned a newly built Royal Enclosure with a royal box. Then, the first public grandstand at the Ascot Racecourse was erected in 1838, seating about 3,000 spectators. Construction continued, and by 1859, the Iron Stand was built, then the Alexandra Stand extension in 1863, and also there was a colonnade entrance built in 1876. Additionally, in 1896, a clock tower was installed.

=== 1900s ===
During the reign of Edward VII, in the 20th century between 1901-02 the three grandstands were demolished, and the Jockey Club, Royal, and Royal Enclosure Stands were built at a cost £57,636 (equivalent to £6,100,000 in 2025). Also, the Five Shilling Stand was built in 1908 for the public to attend races at a cheaper price, later known as the Silver Ring Stand, it cost £30,000. Then, in 1926, the Iron Stand was rebuilt, and the Tote Stand was built in 1929, which is still in use today.

==== Queen Elizabeth Stand ====
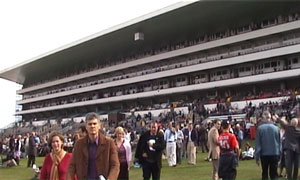
Ascot's pre-2006 grandstand

From 13 June 1961, the main grandstand consisting of the Victorian Grand, Alexandra and Iron stands were demolished to make way for a new grandstand named the Queen Elizabeth Stand, which could seat 13,000 people. It was completed in the following 11 months at a cost of £1,000,000 (equivalent to £19,400,000 in 2025). The Members' Stand was built in 1964.

=== 2004 ===
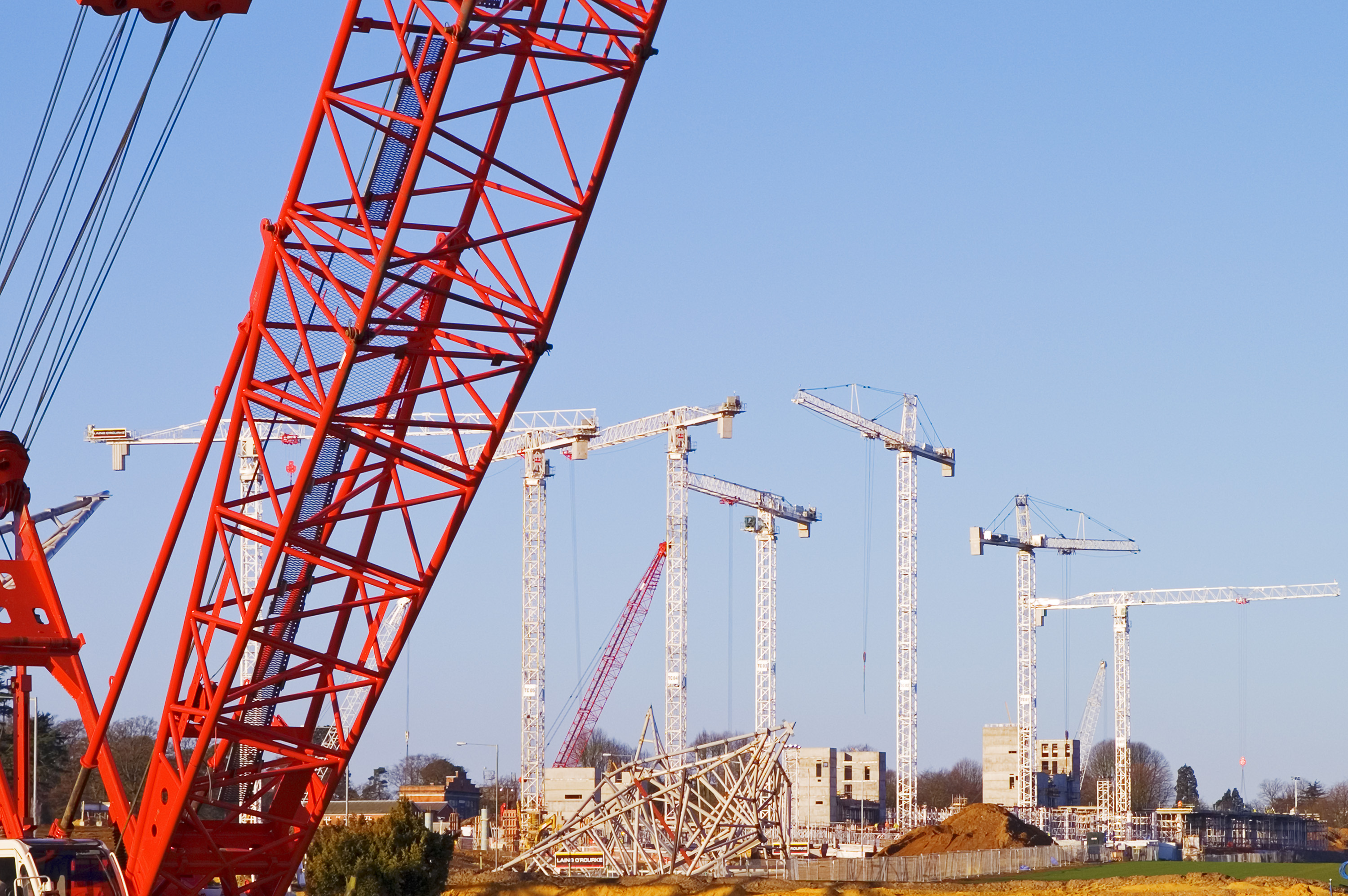
2005 construction of the new grandstand

The Ascot Grandstand was demolished and rebuilt between 2004 and 2006 in a £220 million redevelopment, the single biggest investment in British horse racing. The racecourse was reopened by the queen on 20 June 2006. The redevelopment was designed by architect firm HOK (Populous), and was engineered by Buro Happold and built by Laing O'Rourke. The main part of the redevelopment programme was the construction of the 30 m × 300 m (98 ft × 984 ft) lightweight parasol roof structure of the 480 m (1,570 ft) long grandstand for the 30,000 seating arrangement; this was designed and built by Austrian specialist contractor Waagner-Biro. The overall specification of the grandstand was to allow 80,000 spectators sitting and standing, and for the racecourse to host over 300,000 attendees during Royal Ascot week. For the 2005 season, the Royal Ascot meet was held at York Racecourse. For 2007, further alterations were made to improve the viewing from lower levels of the grandstand using an innovative steel composite product ("SPS" sandwich plate system) to reprofile the existing concrete terraces. The adjustment supposedly cost £10 million.

== The seasons – flat and jumps ==
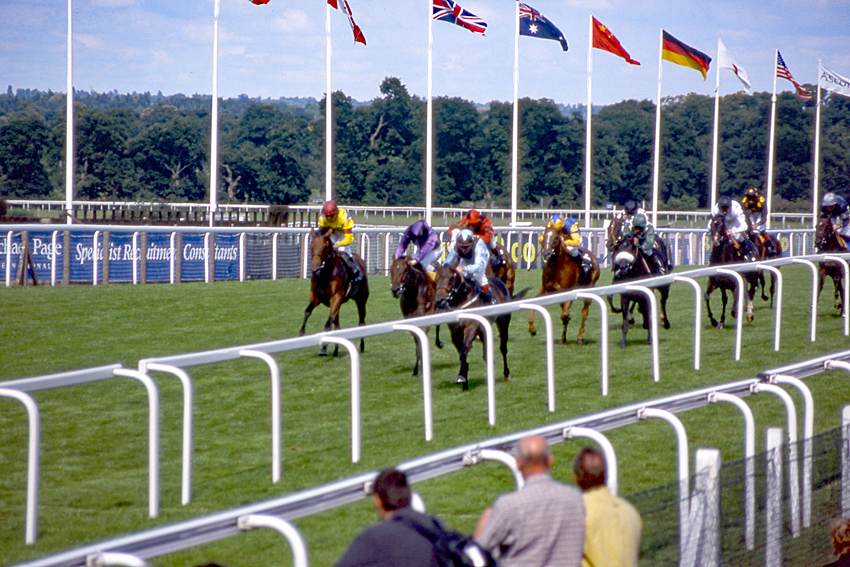
The finishing straight at Ascot

The first major redevelopment of the racecourse came in 1954, when the straight mile was moved to make more room for spectators. The flat season at Ascot is run from April to October, beginning with Royal Ascot Trials Day and finishing with QIPCO British Champions Day. In all, Ascot hosts 18 days of flat racing each year, totalling roughly 115 flat races each summer. Grass is cut to a regulation 4 inches exactly for flat racing. Ascot hosts 13 Group 1 Flat races each year including the Gold Cup, St James's Palace Stakes, King's Stand Stakes, Commonwealth Cup and King George VI and Queen Elizabeth Stakes. British Champions Day holds the greatest number of Group 1 races of any raceday at Ascot with five races at the top level.

The first jumps fixture was held at Ascot in 1965. The national hunt course, a right handed triangular shaped course like the flat course, is laid out inside the flat track, and is about 1m 5f round, with ten fences, including two in the straight, and six flights of hurdles. The track is famed for being one of the toughest courses with a 73-foot climb from the lowest point, Swinley Bottom, to the highest point, the winning post. Ascot hosts eight days of jumps racing between October and March, starting with the Fireworks Spectacular Family Raceday and finishing with the Spring Family Raceday. Included are both steeplechase and hurdle races, with around 50 jumps races in all being held at Ascot each season. Grass is cut to a regulation 5 inches exactly for jumps racing. Notable jumps races held at Ascot are the Clarence House Chase, Ascot Chase and Long Walk Hurdle, all Grade 1 contests.

== Royal Ascot ==
Royal Ascot evolved from the first four-day race meeting held at Ascot in 1768, although the meeting as it is known today only really started to take shape with the introduction of The Gold Cup in 1807. Until 1939, Royal Ascot was the only race meeting held at the racecourse. The Gold Cup remains the feature race of the third day of Royal Ascot, traditionally the busiest day of the week. During the racecourse's redevelopment in 2005, the Royal Meeting was held at York Racecourse.

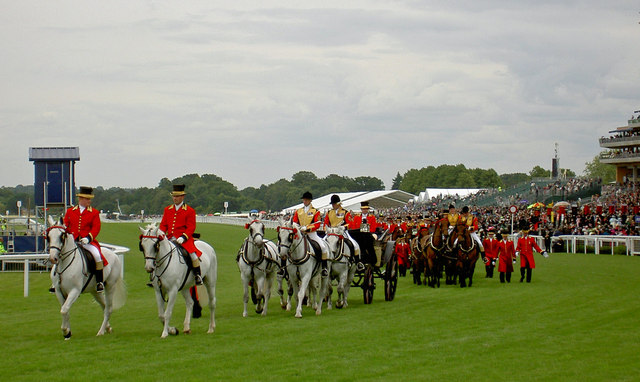
The carriages depart after the monarch's arrival at the races

Royal Ascot is held annually over five days, generally in the third week of June. Each of the five days of Royal Ascot begins with the Royal Procession at 2pm, when the monarch and other members of the royal family arrive down the straight mile in the royal Landaus, accompanied by the playing of the National Anthem and the raising of the Royal Standard. This tradition was started in 1825 by George IV.

Royal Ascot is Britain's most valuable race meeting, with millions of pounds in prize money (just over £7.3 million in 2019). About 500 horses race across the five days. Eighteen Group races, eight of them Group 1, are staged each year, and are broadcast to audiences in almost 200 territories around the world.

Ascot employees are augmented by more than 6,500 temporary staff, with over 33,500 items of temporary furniture and 20,000 flowers and shrubs grown especially for the Royal Meeting.

There are four enclosures in total at Royal Ascot, three of them open to the public. The Royal Enclosure is the most prestigious, with access strictly limited. First-time applicants must apply to the Royal Enclosure Office and gain sponsorship from someone who has attended the Royal Enclosure for at least four years. Existing members are sent invitations by His Majesty's Representative to request badges each year. Badges are hand-written and can only be worn by the named person. Colours of badges vary for each day of the Royal Meeting.

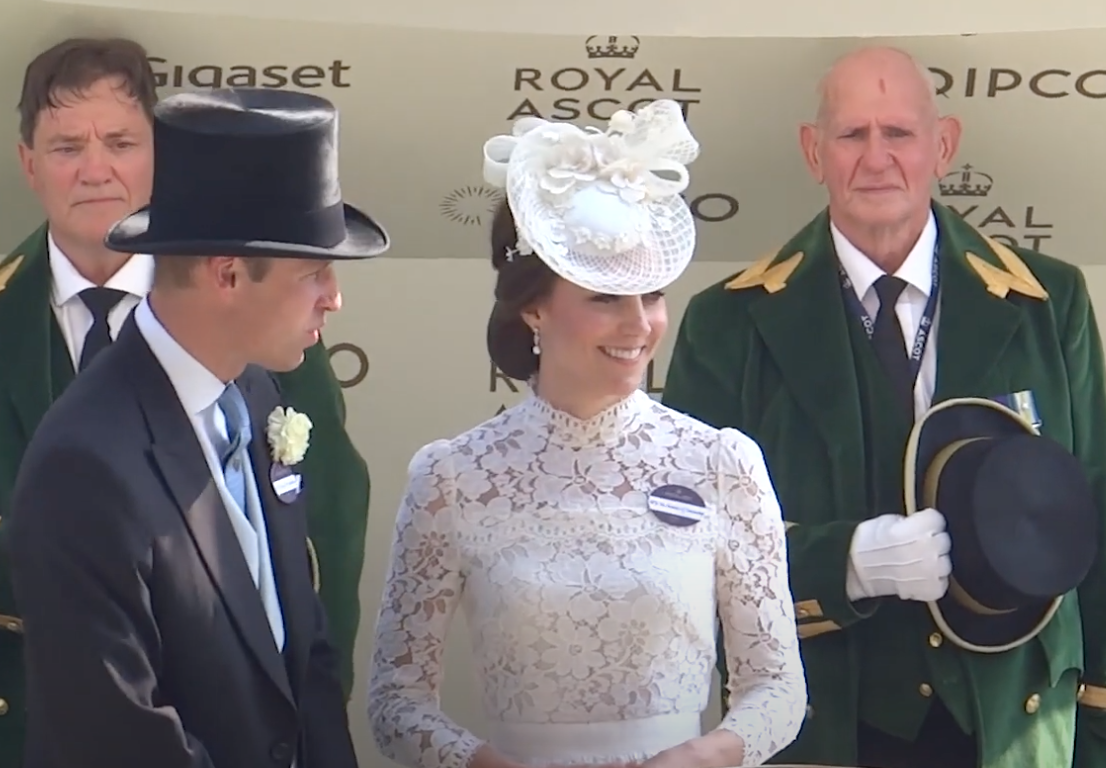
Prince William, Duke of Cambridge in morning dress with top hat and Catherine, Duchess of Cambridge, wearing formal daywear with a headpiece, 2017

The Royal Enclosure has a very strict dress code, with men wearing grey, navy or black morning dress and top hat, and women wearing formal daywear and a hat with a solid base of 4 inches or more in diameter. The origins of the Royal Ascot dress code can be traced back to the early 19th century when Beau Brummel, a close friend of the Prince Regent, decreed that men of elegance should wear waisted black coats and white cravats with pantaloons to the Royal Meeting.

The Queen Anne Enclosure is Royal Ascot's premier public enclosure, granting guests access to the parade ring, grandstand and trackside lawns. Guests in the Queen Anne Enclosure are also invited to participate in the daily tradition of singing around the bandstand after racing. The dress code in the Queen Anne Enclosure is still formal, but more relaxed than that of the Royal Enclosure. Women must dress "in a manner that befits a formal occasion" and must wear a hat or fascinator at all times. Gentlemen are required to wear a full-length suit with a collared shirt, tie and socks covering the ankle.

The Windsor Enclosure offers a more informal and relaxed atmosphere. There is no formal dress code, but guests are encouraged to wear "smart daywear"—collared shirts and jackets for men, hats or fascinators for women. Guests in the Windsor Enclosure are the first to view the Royal Procession as the enclosure is positioned to the east of the Grandstand along the Straight Mile. The Village Enclosure has been a successful addition since 2017 and is located on the Heath, in the middle of the racecourse. This enclosure, open from the Thursday to Saturday of the Royal Meeting. The dress code is similar, but slightly less formal to that of the Queen Anne Enclosure, with women wearing formal daywear and a hat and men wearing jackets, full-length trousers, a tie and socks covering the ankle.

The annual Royal Meeting takes place over five days beginning on a Tuesday, with the first race traditionally being the Queen Anne Stakes. Two further Group 1 contests normally take place on that day: the King Charles III Stakes and the St James's Palace Stakes round off the feature races on the card.

The highlight of Wednesday's racing is the Group 1 Prince of Wales's Stakes.

On Thursday, the oldest and most prestigious race takes place: the Gold Cup over two-and-a-half miles, making it a stiff test for horses. In 2020, this race was won by Frankie Dettori on Stradivarius, for a third consecutive year. It is also the day when high fashion takes centre stage, and has been colloquially termed "Ladies Day".

The fourth day of the Royal Meeting features two Group 1 races in the Coronation Stakes and the Commonwealth Cup, whilst the final day, Saturday, offers a relaxed and social atmosphere, with the Queen Elizabeth II Jubilee Stakes being the feature race.

=== Schedule of races ===
Schedule of races (in June)
| Day | Race | Grade | Distance | Age/sex |
|---|---|---|---|---|
| Tuesday | Queen Anne Stakes | Group 1 | 1m | 4yo + |
| Tuesday | Coventry Stakes | Group 2 | 6f | 2yo only |
| Tuesday | King Charles III Stakes | Group 1 | 5f | 3yo + |
| Tuesday | St James's Palace Stakes | Group 1 | 1m | 3yo C only |
| Tuesday | Ascot Stakes | Handicap (Heritage Handicap) | 2m 4f | 4yo + |
| Tuesday | Wolferton Stakes | Listed | 1m 2f | 4yo + |
| Tuesday | Copper Horse Stakes | Handicap | 1m 6f | 4yo + |
| Wednesday | Queen Mary Stakes | Group 2 | 5f | 2yo F only |
| Wednesday | Queen's Vase | Group 2 | 1m 6f | 3yo only |
| Wednesday | Duke of Cambridge Stakes | Group 2 | 1m | 4yo + FM |
| Wednesday | Prince of Wales's Stakes | Group 1 | 1m 2f | 4yo + |
| Wednesday | Royal Hunt Cup | Handicap (Heritage Handicap) | 1m | 3yo + |
| Wednesday | Kensington Palace Stakes | Handicap | 1m | 4yo + FM |
| Wednesday | Windsor Castle Stakes | Listed | 5f | 2yo only |
| Thursday | Chesham Stakes | Listed | 7f | 2yo only |
| Thursday | King George V Stakes | Handicap (Heritage Handicap) | 1m 4f | 3yo only |
| Thursday | Ribblesdale Stakes | Group 2 | 1m 4f | 3yo F only |
| Thursday | Gold Cup | Group 1 | 2m 4f | 4yo + |
| Thursday | Britannia Stakes | Handicap (Heritage Handicap) | 1m | 3yo CG only |
| Thursday | Hampton Court Stakes | Group 3 | 1m 2f | 3yo only |
| Thursday | Buckingham Palace Stakes | Handicap | 7f | 3yo + |
| Friday | Albany Stakes | Group 3 | 6f | 2yo F only |
| Friday | Commonwealth Cup | Group 1 | 6f | 3yo CF only |
| Friday | Duke of Edinburgh Stakes | Handicap | 1m 4f | 3yo + |
| Friday | Coronation Stakes | Group 1 | 1m | 3yo F only |
| Friday | Standringham Stakes | Handicap | 1m | 3yo F only |
| Friday | King Edward VII Stakes | Group 2 | 1m 4f | 3yo CG only |
| Friday | Palace of Holyroodhouse Stakes | Handicap | 5f | 3yo only |
| Saturday | Norfolk Stakes | Group 2 | 5f | 2yo only |
| Saturday | Hardwicke Stakes | Group 2 | 1m 4f | 4yo + |
| Saturday | Queen Elizabeth II Jubilee Stakes | Group 1 | 6f | 4yo + |
| Saturday | Jersey Stakes | Listed | 7f | 3yo only |
| Saturday | Wokingham Stakes | Handicap (Heritage Handicap) | 6f | 3yo + |
| Saturday | Golden Gates Stakes | Handicap | 1m 2f | 3yo only |
| Saturday | Queen Alexandra Stakes | Conditions | 2m 5f 159y | 4yo + |

Key to gender abbreviations: C=colts; F=fillies; G=geldings; M=mares.

== King George Diamond Weekend ==
While the grandeur of Royal Ascot takes centre stage in June, Ascot's premier summer race actually takes place in July, sponsored by QIPCO. As Europe's midsummer middle-distance showpiece, the King George VI and Queen Elizabeth Stakes has seen many champions crowned. In 2020, Enable made history by becoming the first triple winner of the race having also won in 2019 and as a three-year-old in 2017. There are also two dual winners to date – Dahlia and Swain.

== QIPCO British Champions Day ==
Since 2011 Ascot has staged QIPCO British Champions Day annually in October, now the culmination of the European elite flat racing season. The culmination of the British Champions Series, this sees the crowning of the Champion Jockey, Champion Apprentice, Champion Trainer and Champion Owner of each year. The day hosts five Group races, all of them being Group 1.

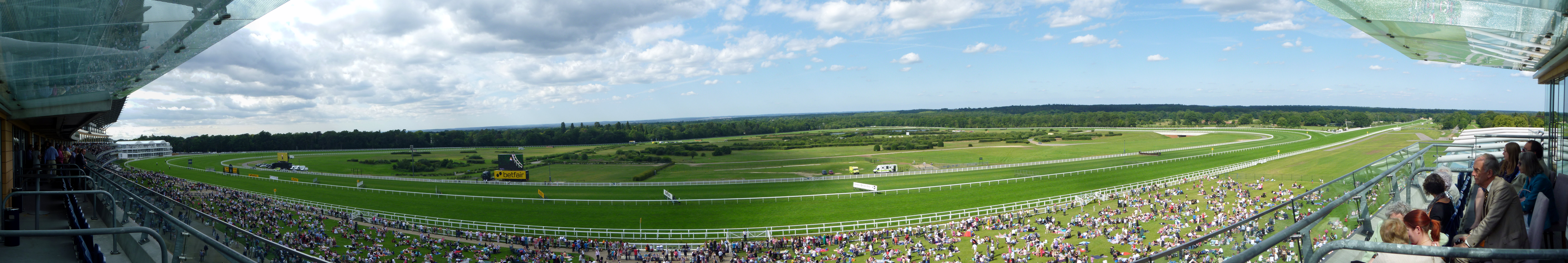
Family day at Ascot Racecourse

| Month | DOW | Race | Grade | Distance | Age/sex |
|---|---|---|---|---|---|
| October | Saturday | British Champions Sprint Stakes | Group 1 | 6f | 3yo + |
| October | Saturday | British Champions Long Distance Cup | Group 1 | 2m | 3yo + |
| October | Saturday | British Champions Fillies' and Mares' Stakes | Group 1 | 1m 4f | 3yo + fm |
| October | Saturday | Queen Elizabeth II Stakes | Group 1 | 1m | 3yo + |
| October | Saturday | Champion Stakes | Group 1 | 1m 2f | 3yo + |

== Notable races ==
| Month | DOW | Race | Type | Grade | Distance | Age/sex |
|---|---|---|---|---|---|---|
| January | Saturday | Holloway's Hurdle | Hurdle | Grade 2 | 2m 3f 110y | 4yo + |
| January | Saturday | Clarence House Chase | Chase | Grade 1 | 2m 1f | 5yo + |
| January | Saturday | Warfield Mares' Hurdle | Hurdle | Grade 2 | 3m | 4yo + m |
| February | Saturday | Reynoldstown Novices' Chase | Chase | Grade 2 | 3m | 5yo + |
| February | Saturday | Ascot Chase | Chase | Grade 1 | 2m 5f 110y | 5yo + |
| February | Saturday | Weatherbys Chase | Chase | Premier Handicap | 3m | 5yo + |
| Apr / May | Wednesday | Sagaro Stakes | Flat | Group 3 | 2m | 4yo + |
| Apr / May | Wednesday | Pavilion Stakes | Flat | Group 3 | 6f | 3yo only |
| Apr / May | Wednesday | Paradise Stakes | Flat | Listed | 1m | 4yo + |
| May | Saturday | Victoria Cup | Flat | Handicap | 7f | 4yo + |
| July | Saturday | Summer Mile Stakes | Flat | Group 2 | 1m | 4yo + |
| July | Saturday | Princess Margaret Stakes | Flat | Group 3 | 6f | 2yo only f |
| July | Saturday | King George VI and Queen Elizabeth Stakes | Flat | Group 1 | 1m 4f | 3yo + |
| July | Saturday | Pat Eddery Stakes | Flat | Listed | 7f | 2yo only |
| October | Friday | Noel Murless Stakes | Flat | Listed | 1m 6f | 3yo |
| October | Saturday | Bengough Stakes | Flat | Group 3 | 6f | 3yo + |
| October | Saturday | Cumberland Lodge Stakes | Flat | Group 3 | 1m 4f | 3yo + |
| October | Saturday | Cornwallis Stakes | Flat | Group 3 | 5f | 2yo only |
| Oct / Nov | Saturday | Regal Encore Handicap Chase | Chase | Premier Handicap | 3m | 4yo + |
| November | Saturday | Ascot Hurdle | Hurdle | Grade 2 | 2m 3½f | 4yo + |
| November | Saturday | 1965 Chase | Chase | Grade 2 | 2m 5f | 4yo + |
| December | Friday | Scudamore Open National Hunt Flat Race | National Hunt flat | Listed | 2m | 4yo-5yo |
| December | Friday | Noel Novices' Chase | Chase | Grade 2 | 2m 3f | 4yo + |
| December | Saturday | Ascot Rotary Club Festive Handicap Hurdle | Hurdle | Premier Handicap | 1m 7½f | 4yo + |
| December | Saturday | Ascot Silver Cup | Chase | Premier Handicap | 3m | 4yo + |
| December | Saturday | Long Walk Hurdle | Hurdle | Grade 1 | 3m ½f | 4yo + |

== Shergar Cup ==
The Shergar Cup is an annual event, taking place in August, at Ascot since 2000. Named in honour of Shergar, who won the 1981 Epsom Derby, the day was originally sponsored by Shergar's owner, the Aga Khan. Now sponsored by Dubai Duty Free, the event attracts approximately 30,000 spectators each year.

The world's premier international jockeys competition has four teams: Great Britain and Ireland, Europe, The Rest of The World and The Girls. Teams compete for points in each of the six races in an attempt to win the Shergar Cup, presented to the winning team at the closing ceremony. The Alistair Haggis Silver Saddle is also awarded to the jockey with the most points at the end of the day, with previous winners including Kieren Fallon, Ryan Moore, Sammy Jo Bell and Hayley Turner.

A post racing concert is also held at the Dubai Duty Free Shergar Cup, with previous acts including Rita Ora, Craig David and All Saints.

== Family racedays at Ascot ==
Ascot Racecourse holds four annual family racedays:

- The Spring Family Raceday in March
- The Summer Mile Family Raceday in July
- The Fireworks Spectacular Family Raceday in October or November
- The Christmas Family Raceday in December

Each day hosts a plethora of additional activities for children and aims to promote a love of racing in younger generations.

Ascot Racecourse launched the Colts and Fillies club, a free club for children aged 17 and under, in 2002. It has 20,000 members and promotes making racing more accessible for younger audiences. The club owns a racehorse and organises trips, competitions, days out and special activities on Family Racedays.

== Events outside of horse racing ==
Ascot Racecourse has become a popular venue for events, with 300+ meeting and conference rooms as well as the Grandstand Atrium, with over 4,000 square meters of exhibition space. Many parties and weddings are held at the racecourse every year, including large Asian weddings of up to 1,000 guests.

=== Royal Ascot Cricket Club and Ascot United ===
The racecourse is also home to Royal Ascot Cricket Club, which was founded in 1883. The club's ground is situated in the middle of the racecourse. Ascot United F.C. is located towards the eastern side of the site. A new clubhouse, stand and floodlighting have recently been erected.

== In popular culture ==
The 1910 Royal Meeting was the inspiration for Cecil Beaton's Ascot Gavotte scene in My Fair Lady (1964), as, following the death of King Edward VII, Royal Ascot became "Black Ascot" with all occupants of the Royal Enclosure 'dressing in black, save for white flowers or strings of pearls'. In the film, The racecourse was used as a test for Eliza Doolittle, where Professor Higgins wants to see if she can pass as a high-society woman. She gives herself away by cheering on a horse in a vulgar manner: 'Come on, Dover! Move your bloomin' arse!'

The racecourse has been used for filming many times – most notably three times in James Bond productions, the first being in A View to a Kill (1985), where Bond (played for the last time by Roger Moore) was beginning his mission to defeat Max Zorin (Christopher Walken), whose horse was racing there. The racecourse was used again in Skyfall (2012) where it stood in for Shanghai Pudong International Airport.

== Gallery ==
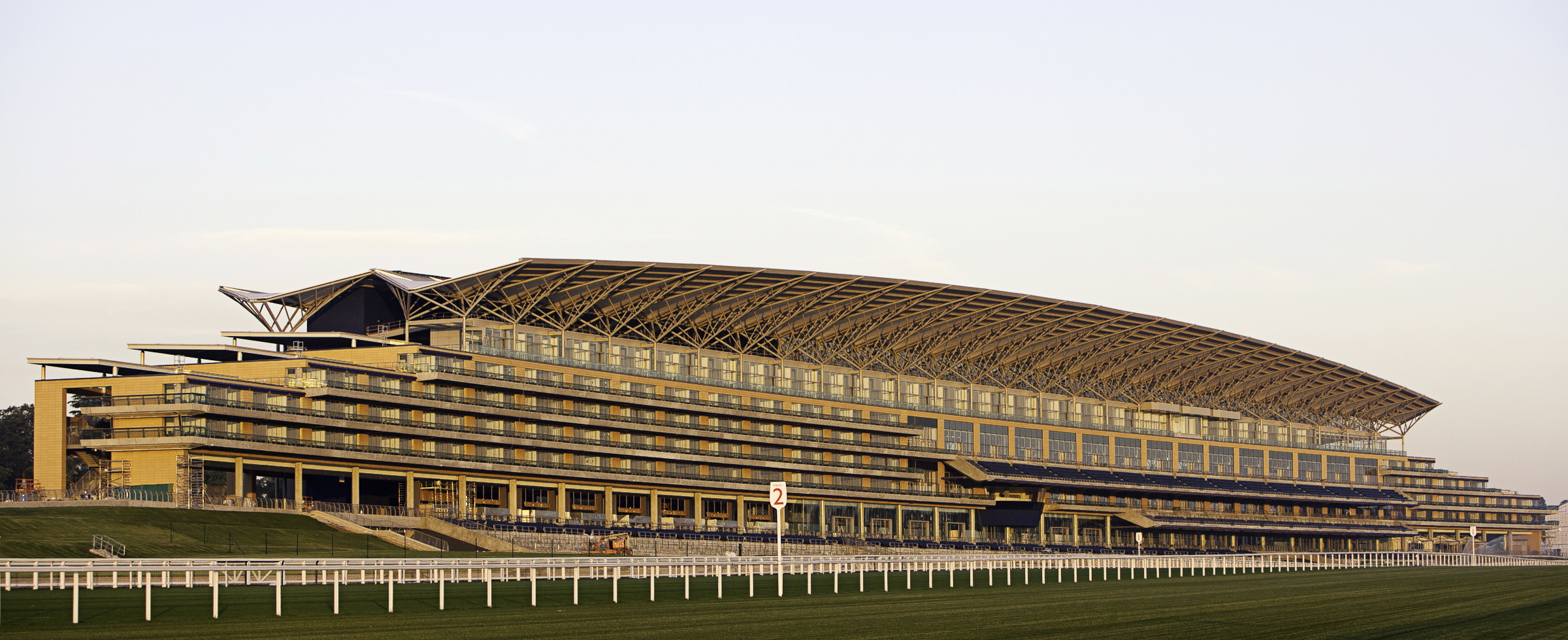
The stand, completed in 2006 and designed by architects Populous and engineers Buro Happold and built by Laing O'Rourke
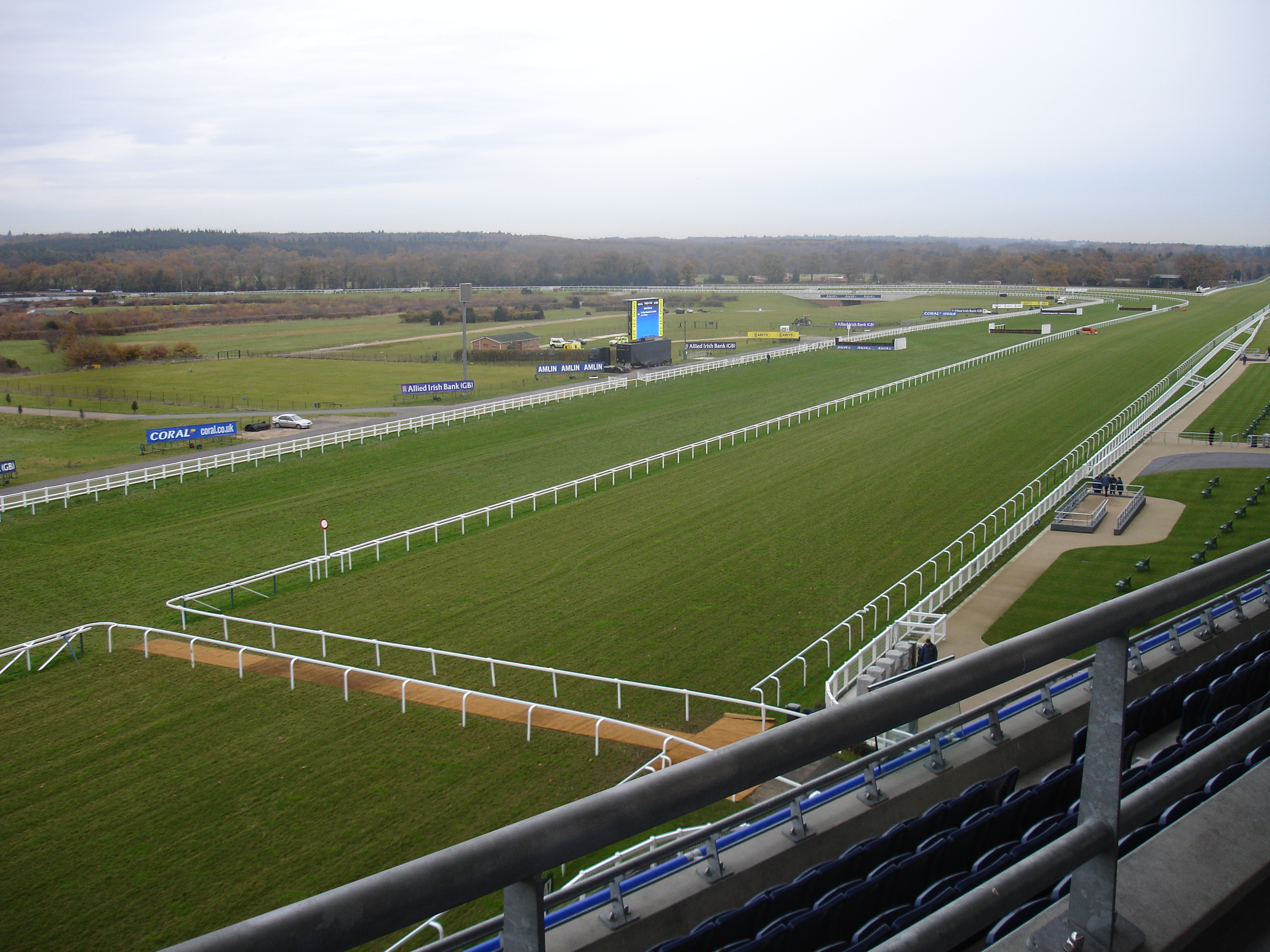
Main straight

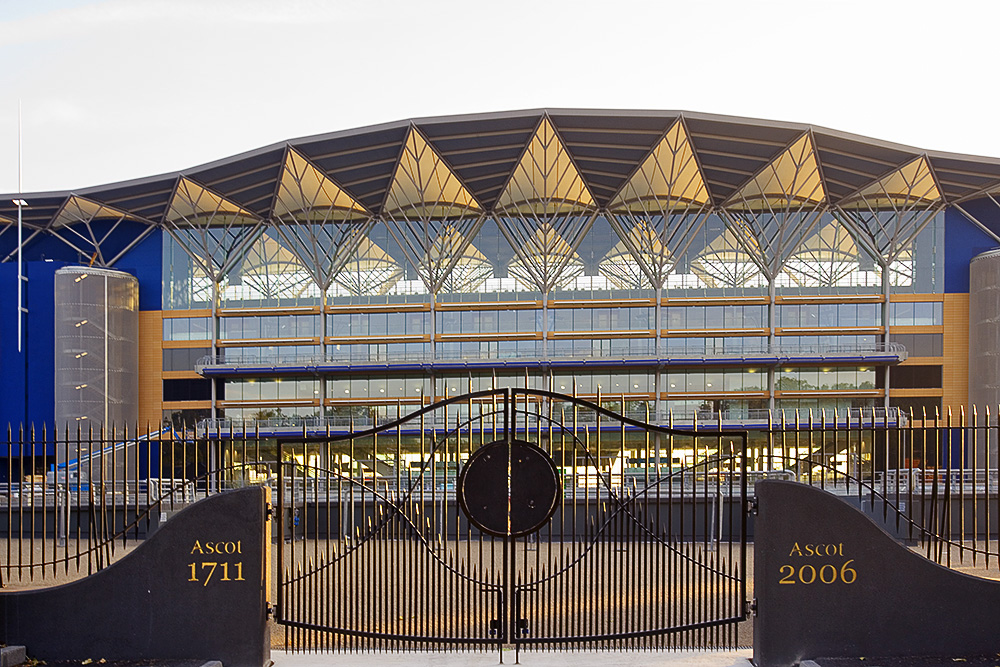
Front entrance to the 2006 Ascot Stands

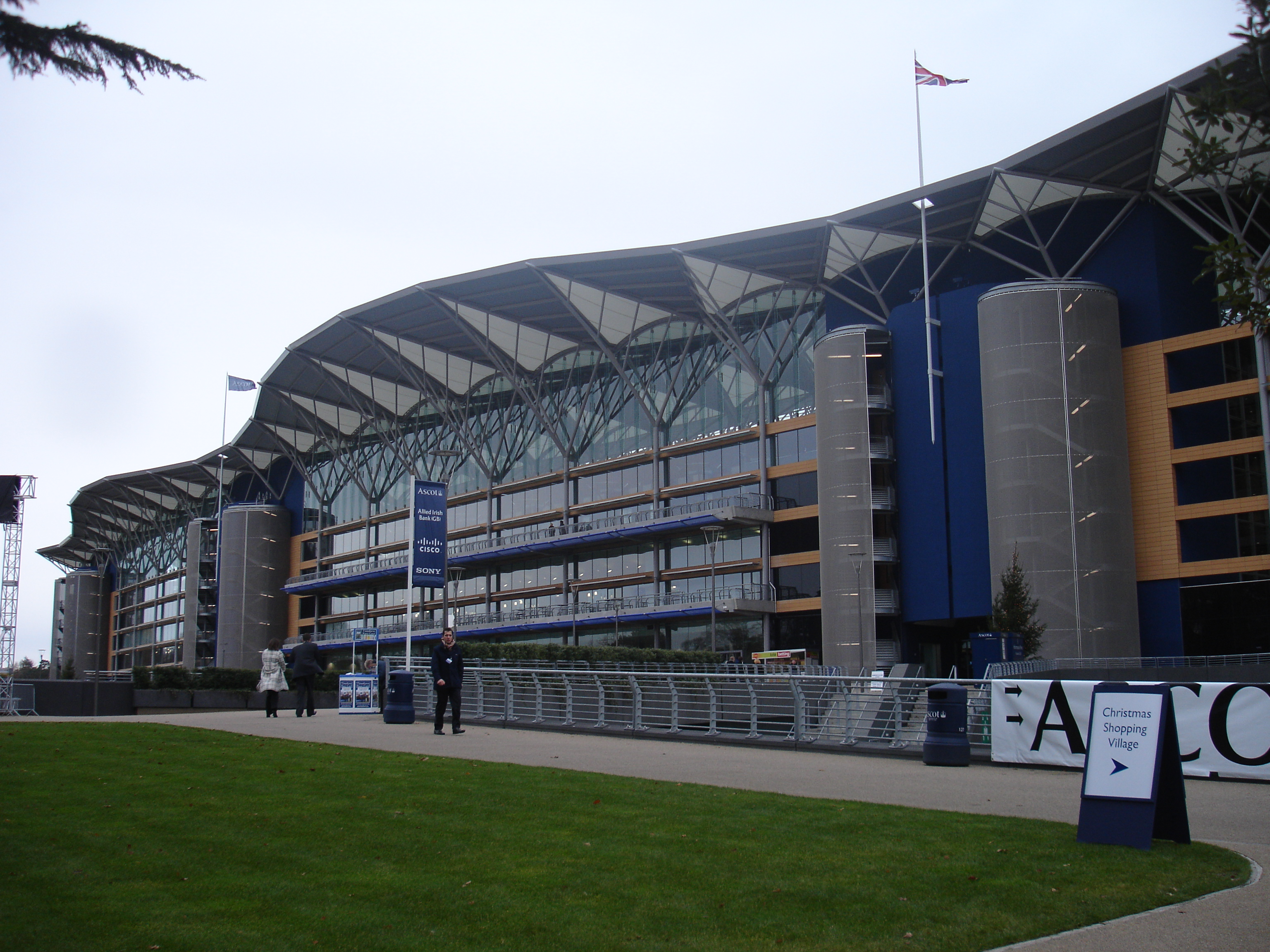
The redeveloped stand

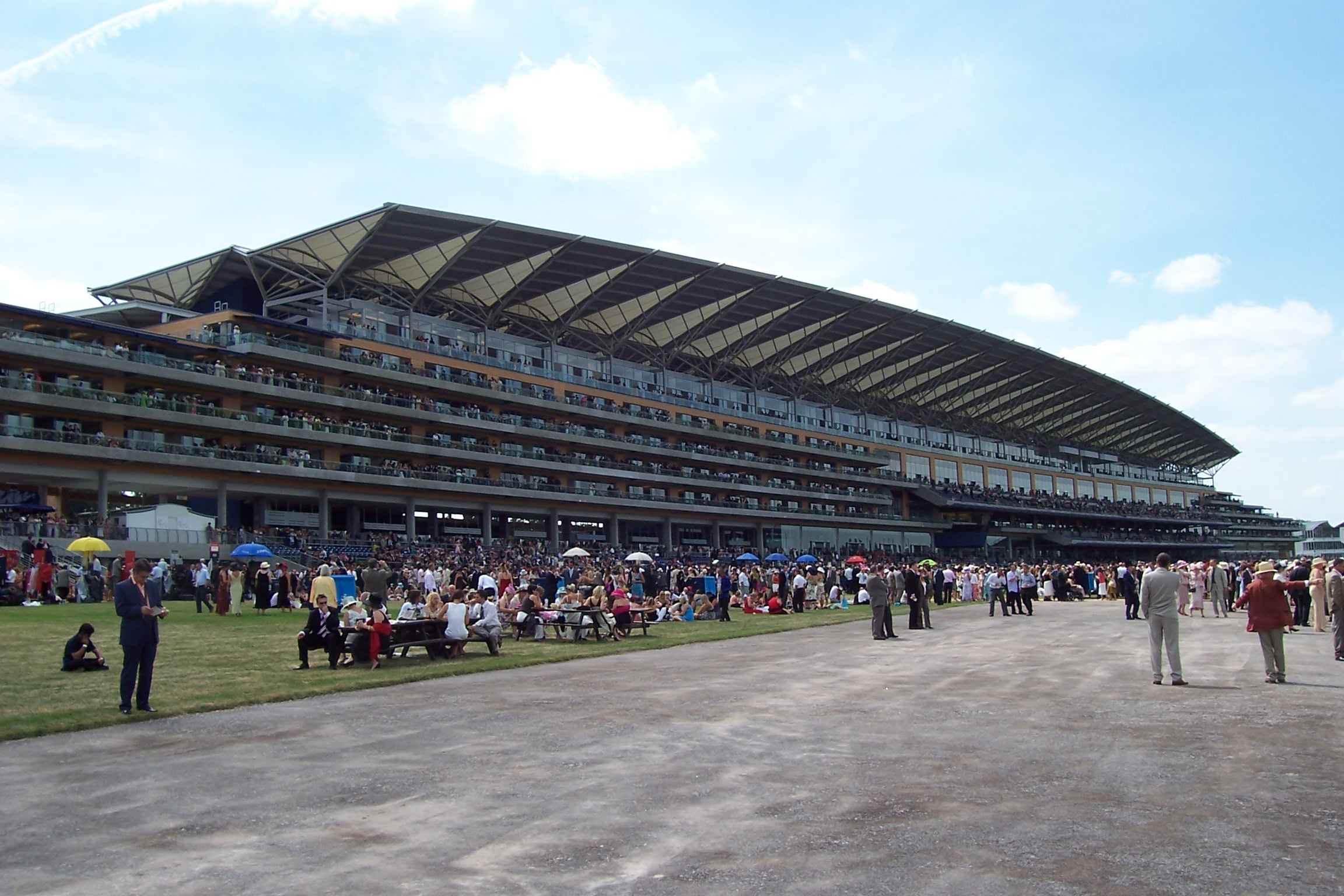
The redeveloped stand from inside

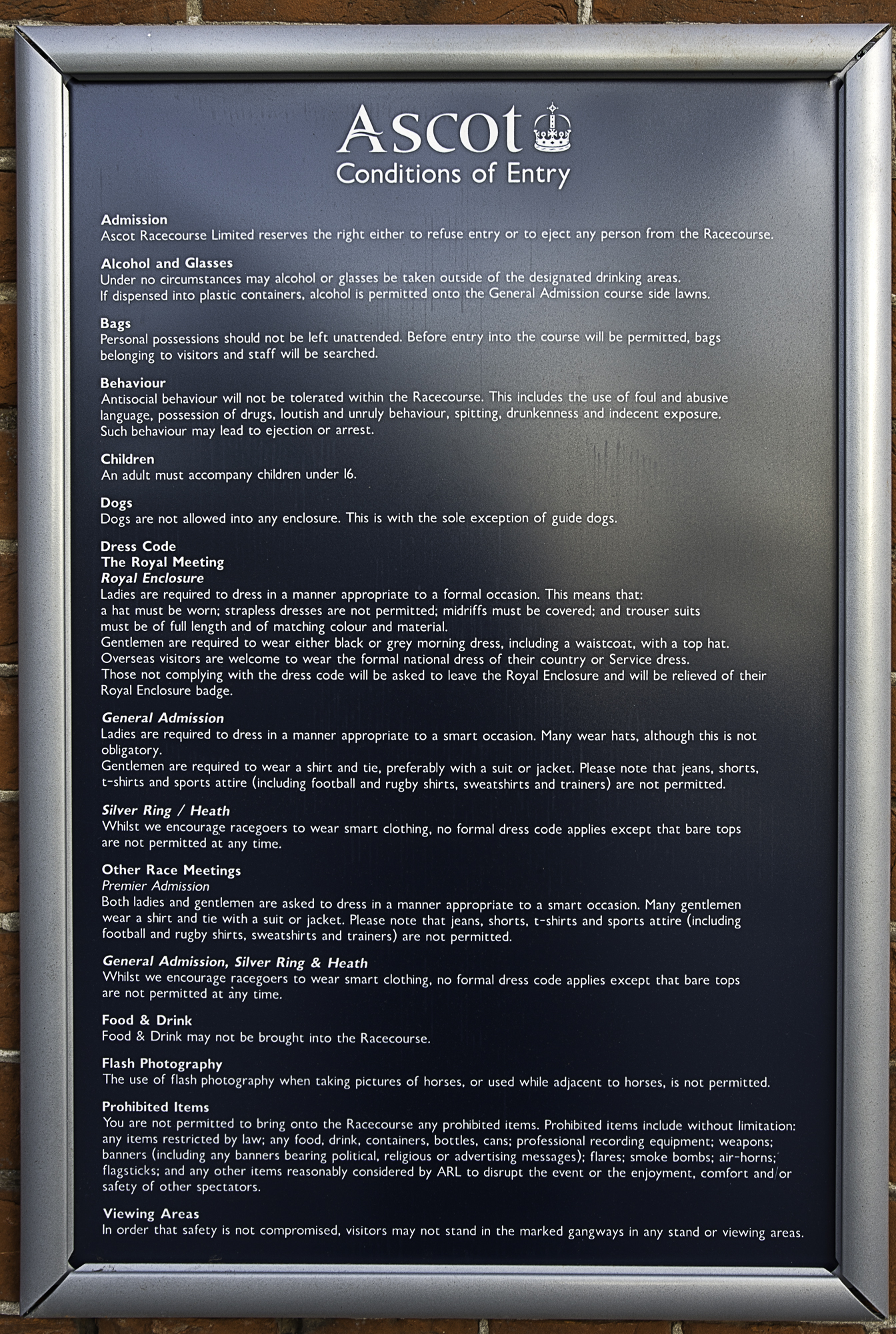
Dress and conduct rules for racegoers at Ascot

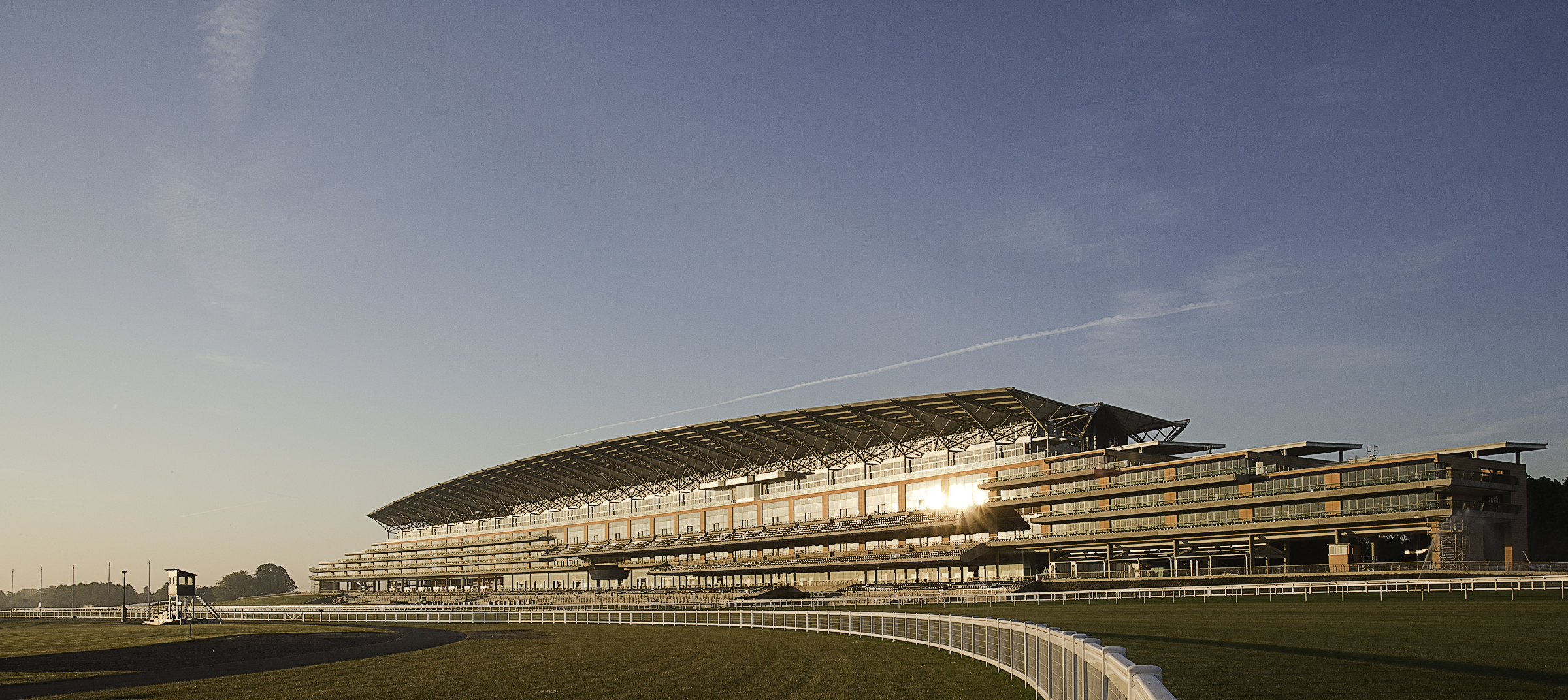
AscotStand from north west

== Bibliography ==
- Cawthorne, George James; Herod, Richard S. (1902). Royal Ascot, Its History & Its Associations (PDF). London: A Treherne & Co.
