= Horse racing colours in Great Britain =

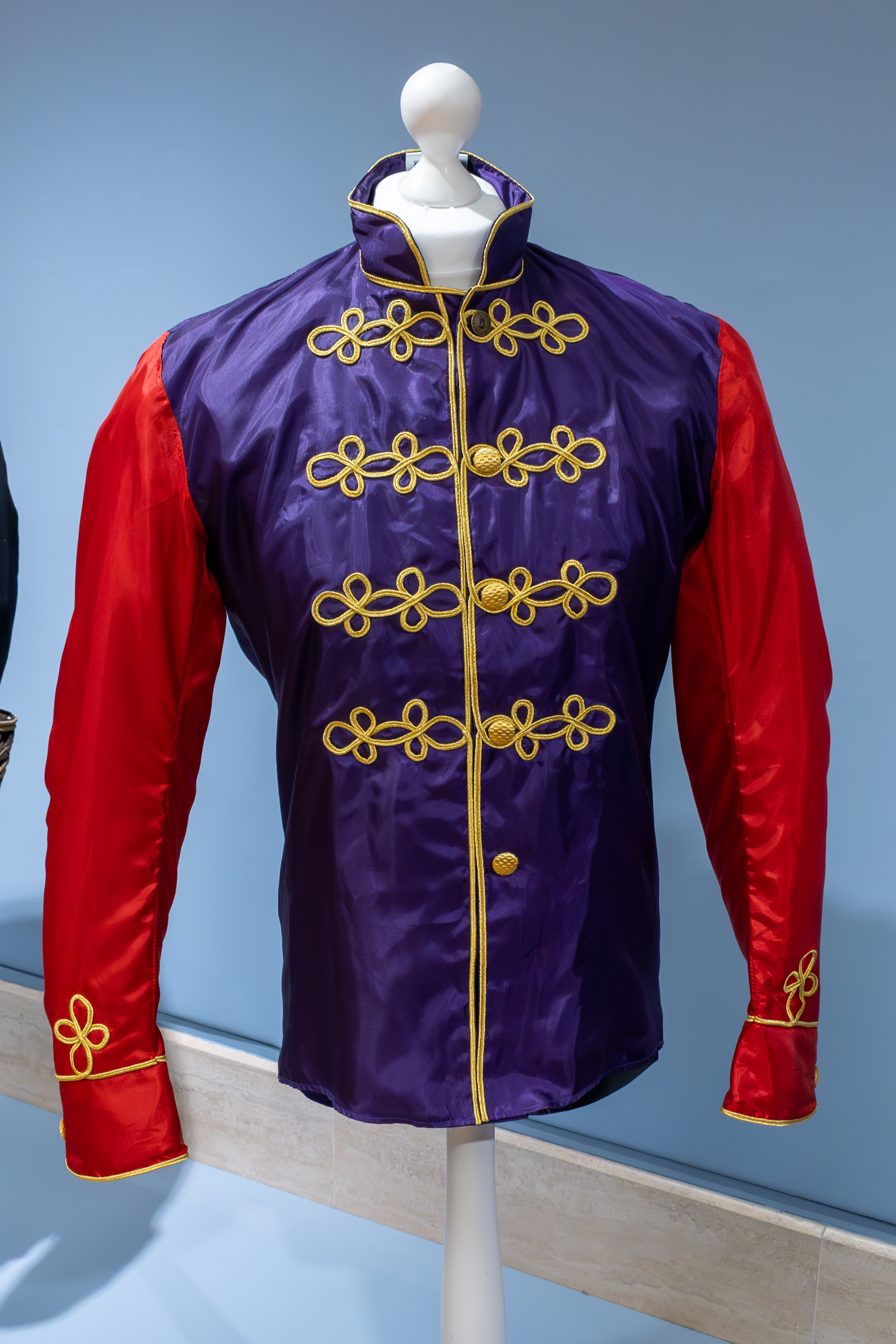
Racing colours of King Charles III: Purple, gold braid, scarlet sleeves, black velvet cap (not shown), gold fringe

Racing colours in British horse racing consist of a silk coat and cap of unique colour combination worn by jockeys during horse races which serve as a quasi-heraldic symbol identifying the horse's owner. The colours serve, as heraldry in its earliest form on the battlefield, as a "recognition device" to enable spectators to identify and differentiate racing horses at a distance.

The display of racing colours in England is strictly regulated by the British Horseracing Authority (BHA) (formerly by the Jockey Club) by whom all colours must be approved and officially registered. Since regulations made in 1970, permissible designs are limited in scope, style and to 18 standard colours (before 2017), and also take account of international agreements between various international controlling bodies of horse racing, counterparts to the BHA, for example the French France Galop (formerly the Société d’Encouragement des Races des Chevaux, founded in 1833). However old colours registered before 1970 are exempt from the restrictive design regulations, including for example the royal colours incorporating gold braid, which date back to Edward VII.

The term "silks" is used in the United States to refer to racing colours. Racing colours comprise three elements: jacket, sleeves and cap, the colours of which being stated in that order (as a blazon for a coat of arms) define the "racing colours".

== Ownership ==
Racing colours are not heritable as is heraldry, the design and form of which descends via the male line automatically on death of the holder. Racing colours may be acquired by application to the Jockey Club on their "Racing Colours application form".

== History ==
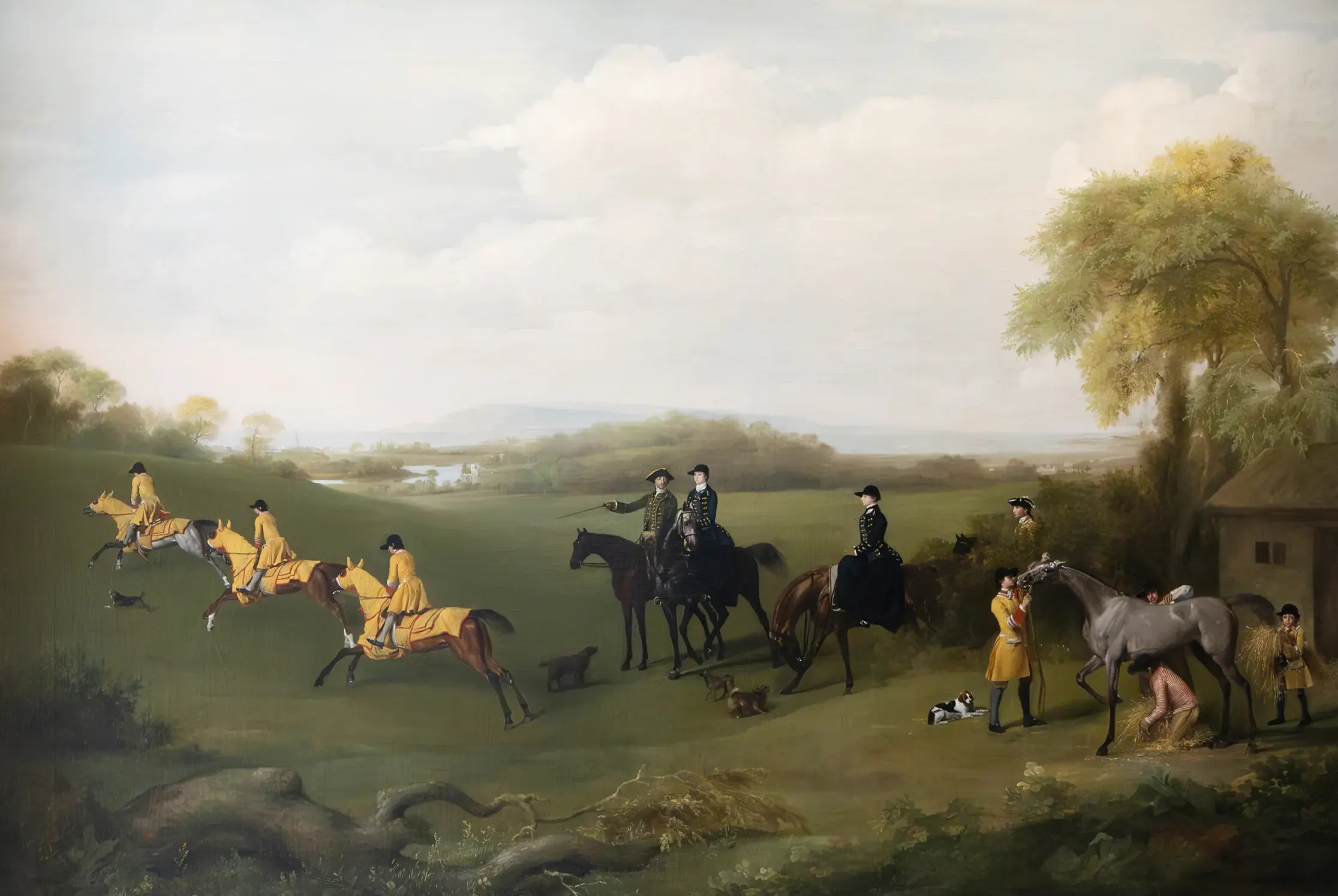
1759 painting of jockeys and grooms wearing the yellow livery of the Duke of Richmond

The practice of riders wearing colours probably stems from medieval times when jousts were held between knights. However, the origins of racing colours of various patterns may have been influenced by racing held in Italian city communities since medieval times. Such traditional events are still held on town streets and are known for furious riding and the colourful spectacle they offer, for example the Palio di Siena.

The wearing of colours or silks originated in England and was first mentioned in 1515, probably being an extension of the owner's livery colours, i.e. as displayed on the costume of his domestic servants. The system was formalised and regulated in the 1700s by the Jockey Club (founded at Newmarket circa 1750), a century and a half after horse-racing in its current form became established during the reign of King James I in the environs of Newmarket in Suffolk. In 1762 the second order made by the Jockey Club stipulated that the riders must wear the colours of their patrons "for the greater conveniency of distinguishing the horses in running, as also for the prevention of disputes". Prior to 2017 a rule specified that only 18 standard colours were allowed.

== Designs ==
Racing colours of Viscount Portman, as his coat of arms Or, a fleur-de-lys azure

Designs in racing colours may be compared to simple heraldic designs incorporating "heraldic ordinaries", for example the bend, chevron, fess, etc., which appear in racing colours in the form of stripes, braces, hoops, etc. Other heraldic designs are reflected in racing colours as follows: bend sinister (sash); saltire (cross belts); chequy (check); roundels (spots); mullets (stars); per pale (halved); quarterly (quartered); per saltire (diabolo); lozenges (diamonds); paly (striped); barry (hooped); fess dancetty (chevron hoop).

The design was at first shown only on the front of the jockey's coat, but must now be shown on the back also, which interferes with some heraldic comparisons, for example the sash as it appears on the front, in heraldry a "bend-sinister", when worn on the back as a mirror-image becomes a mere heraldic "bend" (i.e. dexter, the usual positioning). However the beasts, birds, flowers, and monsters so common in heraldry are entirely absent.

In comparison to the heraldic achievement, the jacket is comparable with the shield, the central element of the achievement, with the sleeves being comparable to flaunches, and the cap "as a counter-part to the simple forms of very early crests". In a few rare occurrences the racing colours are identical to the family's coat of arms, for example Viscount Portman, whose arms are Or, a fleur-de-lys azure.

== Method of wearing ==
Silks are worn over helmets (or skull-caps), safety vests and "skivvies", the latter being a lightweight mesh or microfibre bodysuit, sleeved or sleeveless, whereas, for track work, a more heavy-duty version may be worn.
