= See More Business =

Irish-bred Thoroughbred racehorse

- Racing silks of John Keighley, Paul Barber and Sir Robert Ogden
- Sire: Seymour Hicks
- Grandsire: Ballymore
- Dam: Miss Redlands
- Damsire: Dubassoff
- Sex: Gelding
- Foaled: 26 April 1990
- Country: Ireland
- Colour: Bay
- Breeder: Ian Bryant
- Owner: Paul Barber, John Keighley and Sir Robert Ogden
- Trainer: Paul Nicholls
- Record: 36: 18-3-3
- Earnings: £701,722

Major wins
- Winter Novices' Hurdle (1995); Rising Stars Novices' Chase (1996); King George VI Chase (1997, 1999); Pillar Chase (1998, 2001); Cheltenham Gold Cup (1999); Charlie Hall Chase (1999, 2000); Aon Chase (2000); Betfair Bowl (2000); Jim Ford Challenge Cup (2002, 2003)

See More Business (26 April 1990 – 24 July 2014) was a top-class National Hunt chaser in the late 1990s and early 2000s. He won the 1999 Cheltenham Gold Cup as well as the 1997 and 1999 King George VI Chase.

== Background ==
See More Business was a bay horse with no white markings bred in Ireland by Ian Bryant. Born at Winnal Common in Herefordshire, he was trained by Paul Nicholls at Ditcheat in Somerset. He was ridden in to his biggest victories by Mick Fitzgerald and Andrew Thornton.

== Racing career ==
=== Early career ===
See More Business ran in 3 point-to-points winning two and falling on his final start before making his debut under rules. He made his hurdling debut on 4 November 1995 at Chepstow with a win and followed with two further wins including the Grade 2 Winter Novices' Hurdle.

He reappeared nearly a year later as a novice chaser. He started by winning the Grade 2 Rising Stars Novices' Chase and then was second in a Grade 1 chase and then a Grade 2 chase to Dorans Pride. He was a strongly fancied second favourite at 5/2 for the Racing Post Chase. However, he suffered a heavy fall on the second circuit.

=== 1997/98 season ===
See More Business returned the next season with a win in the Rehearsal Chase at Chepstow and then ran in the King George VI Chase. The joint favourities One Man and Suny Bay disappointed and coming to the last fence he was challenged by Challenger du Luc. He then went on to win the Pillar Chase at Cheltenham ahead of Cyborgo. He went into the Cheltenham Gold Cup as the second favourite behind old rival Dorans Pride. However, disaster struck as Cyborgo's jockey Tony McCoy felt his horse had suffered an injury and urgently tried to pull him up before the next fence. See More Business was running slightly wide of the field and when McCoy pulled Cyborgo out he gave See More Business nowhere to go and took him out of the race.

=== 1998/99 season ===
See More Business' first run of the new season was in the Edward Hanmer Chase but he could only finish fourth. He then retained the Rehearsal Chase in a 3-runner field. He went into the King George VI Chase as the favourite but fared badly and was pulled up as Teeton Mill won. He ran again in the Pillar Chase but could only finish third of five behind new star Cyfor Malta and Go Ballistic. He was now the forgotten horse of the 1999 Gold Cup. His chances were made easier by Cyfor Malta suffering an injury and being unable to run and Teeton Mill suffering a career-ending injury early in the race and having to be pulled up. Towards the final three fences there were only four horses with a chance of winning. Double Thriller faded and then so did favourite Florida Pearl. The scene was set for a thrilling finish between See More Business and 66/1 outsider Go Ballistic. See More Business just prevailed by 1 length.

=== 1999/2000 season ===
The following season See More Business went into the Cheltenham Gold Cup in fantastic form. He'd won the Charlie Hall Chase and defeated Go Ballistic by 17 lengths in winning the King George VI Chase for a second time. This was the last time the race was officially first-scheduled for Monday 27 December; Christmas Sunday still being observed in the UK. Finally, he won the Aon Chase by 18 lengths. He went into the Gold Cup as the 9/4 favourite. However, no horse since L'Escargot had retained the crown and that had been nearly 30 years earlier. In the end he could only come fourth behind Looks Like Trouble, Florida Pearl and Strong Promise. However, he ended his season with a 21 lengths win in the Martell Cup Chase.

=== 2000/01 season ===
See More Business' first port of call the next season was the Charlie Hall Chase where he defeated three rivals by 30 lengths. He then went into the King George VI Chase as the hot favourite with Looks Like Trouble injured. However, he had a dire race and finished a well-beaten fifth. He then won another Pillar Chase before running another disappointing race this time in the Martell Cup Chase (the Cheltenham Festival having been abandoned).

=== 2001/02 season ===
In the subsequent season, See More Business came last in the Rehearsal Chase and was then withdrawn in the Welsh National. See More Business later went on to win the Jim Ford Chase and competed in the Cheltenham Gold Cup race where it came third behind Best Mate and Commanche Court. The last race for See More Business in that season was the Martell Cup Chase at Aintree.

=== Later career ===
See More Business' four races the following season were a mixed bag. He was defeated by More Than A Stroll in Down Royal, won another Rehearsal Chase and Jim Ford before coming well down the field in the Cheltenham Gold Cup.

See More Business' last race was on 6 December 2003 when he ran in another Rehearsal Chase. He was behind on this occasion and went on to a well-deserved retirement.

== Pedigree ==
Pedigree of See More Business (IRE), bay gelding, 1990
Sire Seymour Hicks (FR) 1980	Ballymore (IRE); 1969	Ragusa	Ribot
Sire Seymour Hicks (FR) 1980	Ballymore (IRE); 1969	Ragusa	Fantan*
Sire Seymour Hicks (FR) 1980	Ballymore (IRE); 1969	Paddy's Sister	Ballyogan*
Sire Seymour Hicks (FR) 1980	Ballymore (IRE); 1969	Paddy's Sister	Birthday Wood
Sire Seymour Hicks (FR) 1980	Sarah Siddons (FR); 1973	Le Levanstell	Le Lavandou
Sire Seymour Hicks (FR) 1980	Sarah Siddons (FR); 1973	Le Levanstell	Stella's Sister*
Sire Seymour Hicks (FR) 1980	Sarah Siddons (FR); 1973	Mariel	Relko
Sire Seymour Hicks (FR) 1980	Sarah Siddons (FR); 1973	Mariel	Ela Marita*
Dam Miss Redlands (GB) 1983	Dubassoff (USA); 1969	Sea-Bird	Dan Cupid
Dam Miss Redlands (GB) 1983	Dubassoff (USA); 1969	Sea-Bird	Sicalade
Dam Miss Redlands (GB) 1983	Dubassoff (USA); 1969	Love Lyric	Prince Chevalier
Dam Miss Redlands (GB) 1983	Dubassoff (USA); 1969	Love Lyric	Riding Rays
Dam Miss Redlands (GB) 1983	Tartan Eve (GB); 1971	Even Money	Krakatao
Dam Miss Redlands (GB) 1983	Tartan Eve (GB); 1971	Even Money	Vendome
Dam Miss Redlands (GB) 1983	Tartan Eve (GB); 1971	Scotch Tune	Tartan
Dam Miss Redlands (GB) 1983	Tartan Eve (GB); 1971	Scotch Tune	Buck's Choice (Family:15-a)

* See More Business is inbred 4S x 5S to the stallion Ballyogan, meaning that he appears fourth generation and fifth generation (via Stella's Sister) on the sire side of his pedigree.

* See More Business is inbred 4S x 5S to the mare Fantan, meaning that she appears fourth generation and fifth generation (via Ela Marita) on the sire side of his pedigree.
