= Andrew Thornton =

British jockey (born 1972)

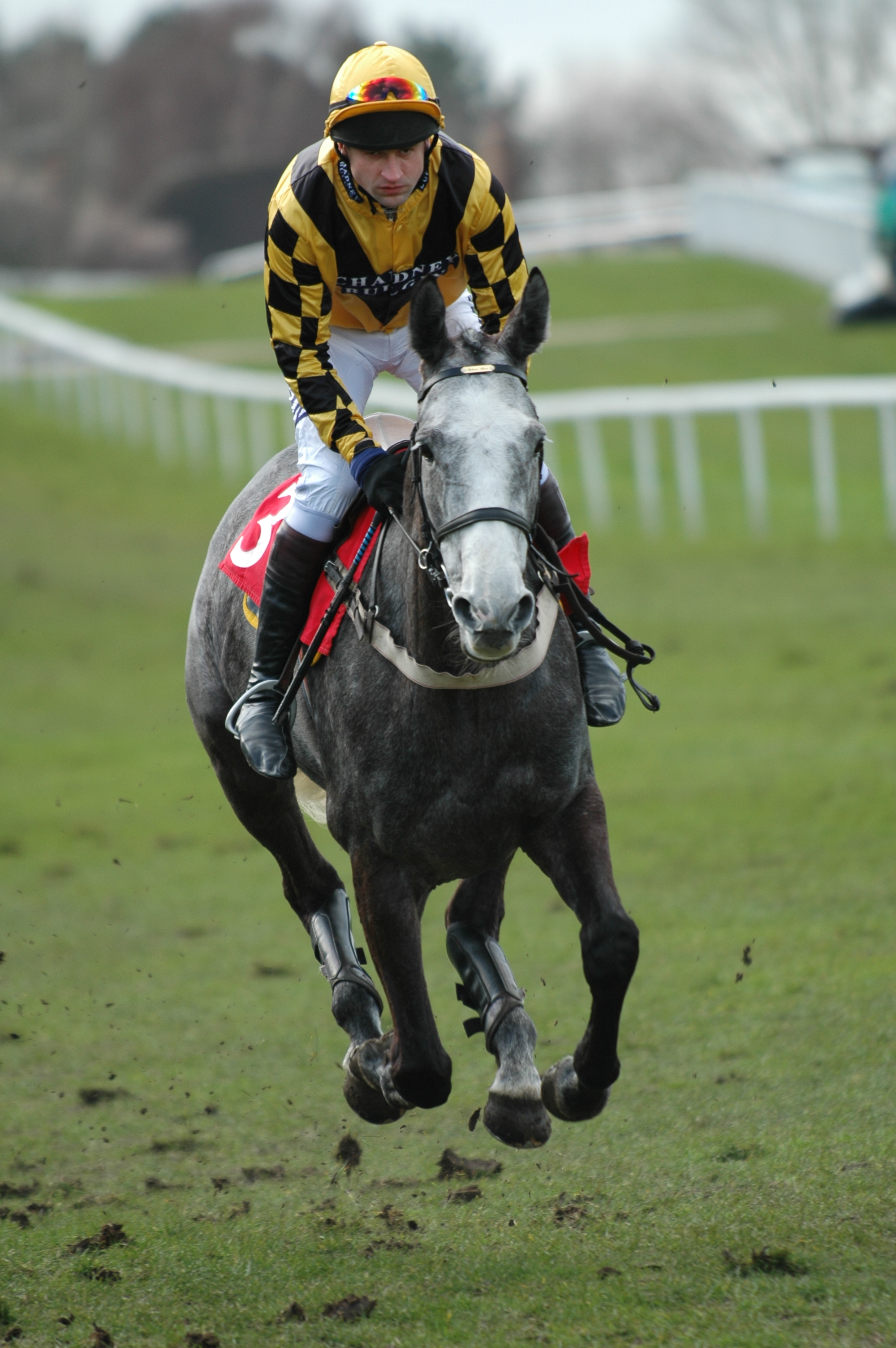
Andrew Thornton on The Listener, 13 March 2005

Andrew Thornton (born 1972) is a retired National Hunt jockey.

== Early life ==
He was born on 28 October 1972 in Cleveland, Yorkshire and schooled at Barnard Castle School in County Durham.

== Riding career ==
He rode mainly for Caroline Bailey and Seamus Mullins, he was stable jockey for Robert Alner for many years as well as riding for plenty of other trainers over the years. Thornton was one of the very few National Hunt jockeys who wore contact lenses while riding and it is for this reason that he acquired the nicknames "Lensio" and "Blindman". Thornton rode his 1000th winner on Kentford Myth at Wincanton on 26 December 2016.

Despite many setbacks and injuries throughout his career, by 2012 Thornton was widely regarded as one of the best jumps jockeys around. He was also very highly respected among his colleagues.

Because Thornton was taller than the average jump jockey, he was forced to ride very low in the stirrups. It was not always attractive to look at but it rarely failed to get the job done. The benefits of his riding style were also highlighted by the record Thornton had in staying handicap chases and staying handicap hurdle races. He was able to push along from a mile out and galvanise the horse. His strength was seen in many exciting finishes when he looked beaten turning for home.

On 6 June 2018, Thornton retired from racing.

Since retirement, Thornton has worked for Sky Sports Racing amongst others. The highlight of his broadcasting career coming on 21 January 2022 when he made his first appearance on the channel’s flagship show, Get In. Presented by regular host Jason (Shark) Weaver and Mike Cattermole. The 'Catt' was deputising for Luke Harvey (The Toxic Turtle).

== Notable horses ==
Thornton rode many horses including Cool Dawn, Gingembre and See More Business to victory in many a big race as well as 8-time winner French Holly who won two Grade 1s and only just failed to win the Champion Hurdle in 1999 when beaten by Istabraq. French Holly’s death in a schooling accident in the Winter of 1999 was a major disappointment to Thornton.

== Achievements and awards ==
- 1996 Lester Award for special recognition
- 1997 Lester Award for special recognition
- 2003 Lester Award for jump ride of the year aboard Kingscliff
- 2007 Lester Award for jump ride of the year aboard Miko De beauchene

He rode major winners for Robert Alner, Seamus Mullins, Evan Williams, Ian Williams, Jamie Poulton, Paul Nicholls, Mary Reveley, John Spearing, Lavina Taylor, Ferdy Murphy and TA Forster.

== Cheltenham Festival winners ==
- 1996 William Hill Trophy Handicap Chase - Maamur
- 1998 Royal & SunAlliance Novices' Hurdle - French Holly
- 1998 Cheltenham Gold Cup - Cool Dawn

== Grade 1 winners ==
- 1997 King George VI Chase - See More Business
- 1998 Tolworth Hurdle - French Holly
- 1998 Royal & SunAlliance Novices' Hurdle - French Holly
- 1998 Cheltenham Gold Cup - Cool Dawn
- 1998 Christmas Hurdle - French Holly
- 2003 Finale Juvenile Hurdle - Sunray

== Other notable winners ==
- 1998 Rendlesham Hurdle - Buckhouse Boy
- 1998 Racing Post Chase - Super Tactics
- 2000 National Spirit Hurdle - Male-Ana-Moo
- 2001 Rendlesham Hurdle - Merry Masquerade
- 2001 Scottish Grand National - Gingembre
- 2002 Hennessy Gold Cup - Gingembre
- 2005 Reynoldstown Novices' Chase - Distant Thunder
- 2006 Cotswold Chase - See You Sometime
- 2007 Racing Post Chase - Simon
- 2007 Welsh National - Miko De Beauchene
- 2008 Red Square Vodka Gold Cup - Miko De Beauchene

== See also ==
- List of jockeys
