= Robert Alner =

British racehorse trainer (1943–2020)

Robert Alner (21 November 1943 – 3 February 2020) was a British racehorse trainer specializing in National Hunt racing. He was based at stables at Droop, near Sturminster Newton in Dorset, England. He trained the winner of the Cheltenham Gold Cup with Cool Dawn in 1998.

In November 2007 he was seriously injured in a car crash and underwent surgery after breaking a bone in his neck. Thereafter he held his training licence jointly with his wife Sally, until they retired in 2010.

He died on 3 February 2020 at the age of 76.
