= Gordon W. Richards =

British racehorse trainer (1930–1998)

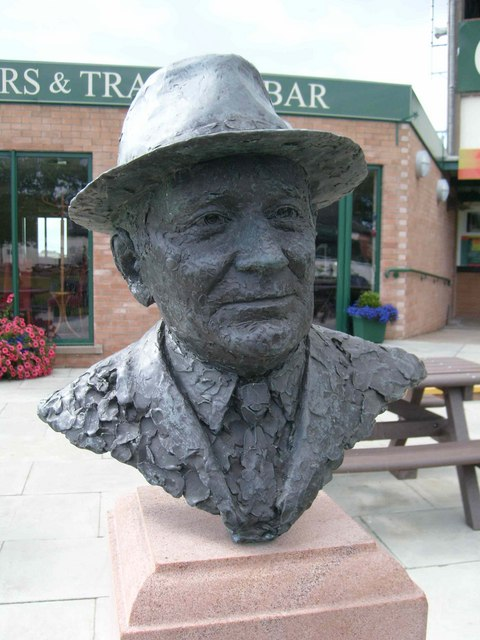

Gordon Waugh Richards (7 September 1930 – 29 September 1998, aged 68) was a British racehorse trainer specialising mainly in National Hunt racing. He trained two winners of the Grand National with Lucius in 1978 and Hallo Dandy in 1984. He also trained One Man to win the King George VI Chase in 1995 and 1996.

He was born in Bath, Somerset and was apprenticed as a flat jockey to Jack Waugh. His middle initial, W., was allegedly inserted in his name by an official at Salisbury Racecourse at the start of his career to differentiate him from the champion flat jockey Sir Gordon Richards. The W. was apparently taken from Waugh's surname. Becoming too heavy for the flat, he rode as a National Hunt jockey for Ivor Anthony and Johnny Marshall; his career as a jockey was ended by a fall at Perth Racecourse in which he broke his back.

In 1964 he took out a licence to train, initially at Beadnell, Northumberland before moving to Greystoke Castle stables near Penrith in Cumbria in 1968. He subsequently moved to a new purpose-built stables at Greystoke village in 1988.

As well as his two Grand National winners he gained major successes with One Man, dual winner of the King George VI Chase and winner of the Queen Mother Champion Chase, and Titus Oates, also a King George VI Chase winner.

On Timeform Ratings, One Man was the best chaser Richards ever trained. He was an exciting horse who visually traveled with ease throughout his races. He won the King George VI Chase twice, and the Queen Mother Champion Chase. He had two attempts to win the Cheltenham Gold Cup, finishing out of the frame both times, in 1996 (when starting the 11/8 favourite), and 1997. On both occasions he weakened in the later stages of the race.

Richards also trained the future, dual Champion Hurdle winner, Sea Pigeon, when the horse began his hurdling career. But owner Pat Muldoon transferred the animal to the Great Habton yard of Peter Easterby, where he won two Chester Cups and an Ebor Handicap, as well as the 1980 and 1981 runnings of the Champion Hurdle.

Richards will also be remembered for training the fearless, front-running two-mile chaser, Noddy's Ryde. The horse was only in his second season over fences when he was killed in action at Devon and Exeter in October 1984. He had been beaten narrowly in the Arkle Challenge Trophy at the Cheltenham Festival in the Spring of that year, after dueling from a long way out with the eventual winner, Bobsline. The race was considered one of the most exciting of the time.

The most supportive patron of the yard was the Edinburgh Woollen Mill, later becoming Ashleybank Investments. Richards trained many good horses for these owners. They commonly named their animals using 'Tartan' as the first word in the name. One of them, Tartan Tailor, won the Supreme Novices' Hurdle at the Cheltenham Festival.

He died from cancer, aged 68, in Carlisle, Cumbria and was succeeded as trainer at Greystoke by his son, Nicky Richards.

== Major wins ==
- Grand National – (2) – Lucius (1978), Hallo Dandy (1984)
- King George VI Chase – (3) – Titus Oates (1969), One Man (1995 & 1996)
- Queen Mother Champion Chase – (1) – One Man (1998)
- Hennessy Gold Cup – (1) – One Man (1994)
- Whitbread Gold Cup – (1) – Titus Oates (1971)

== Biography ==
- John Budden, The Boss: The Life and Times of Horseracing Legend Gordon W. Richards Mainstream publishing, Edinburgh & London, 2000. ISBN 1 84018090 0
