= Quevega =

French-bred racehorse

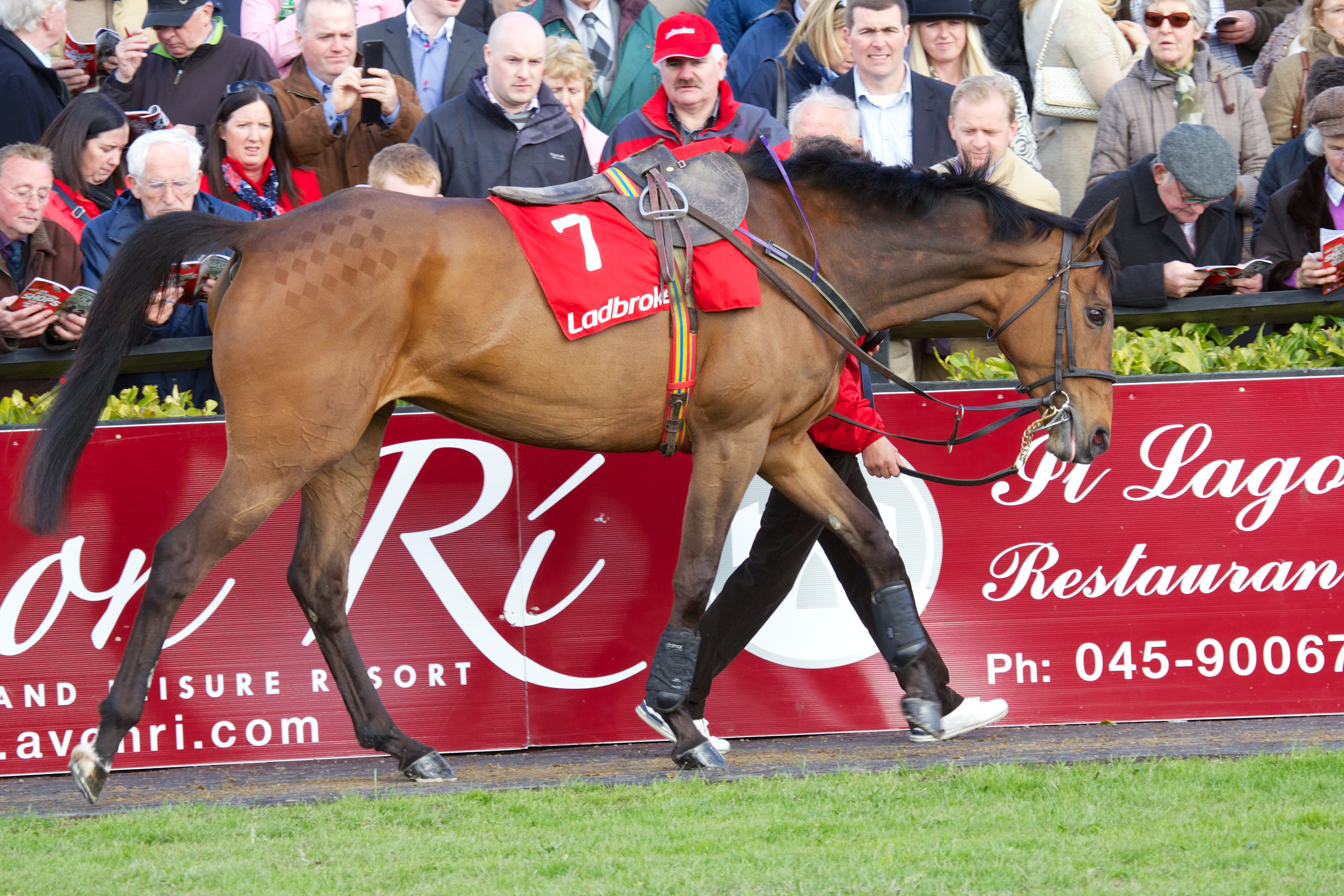
- Sire: Robin des Champs
- Grandsire: Garde Royale
- Dam: Vega
- Damsire: Cap Martin
- Sex: Mare
- Foaled: 11 April 2004
- Country: France
- Colour: Bay
- Breeder: Pierre Rives
- Owner: Hammer & Trowel Syndicate
- Trainer: Willie Mullins
- Record: 24: 16-1-4
- Earnings: £536,263

Major wins
- David Nicholson Mares' Hurdle (2009, 2010, 2011, 2012, 2013, 2014); World Series Hurdle (2010, 2011, 2012, 2013)

Honours
- Quevega Mares Hurdle at Punchestown Racecourse

Quevega (foaled 11 April 2004) is a retired French-bred Irish-trained National Hunt mare, best known for winning the David Nicholson Mares' Hurdle at the Cheltenham Festival a record six times in a row, beating the previous record set by Golden Miller's five consecutive Gold Cups in the 1930s. She also won the World Series Hurdle at Punchestown over three miles four times, but was beaten in her attempt at a fifth successive win at the 2014 Festival.

== Background ==
=== Pedigree ===
Quevega was bred by Pierre Rives in France and is owned by the Hammer & Trowel Syndicate. Her sire, Robin des Champs, is a successful National Hunt stallion and a grandson of Mill Reef. He has also sired top chaser Sir Des Champs. Her dam, Vega, is a granddaughter of Prix Ganay winner Carmarthen. She is a 16hh bay mare, not big but “as strong as an ox”.

=== Early career ===
Quevega began her career in France in 2007, where she was trained by B. Watrigant. She won her first race in September at Vichy over twelve furlongs, and added a further two victories before being transferred to Ireland and put into training with Champion Trainer Willie Mullins.

== Career in Ireland ==
=== 2008 season ===
On her Irish debut in February, Quevega won a maiden hurdle race at Punchestown by six lengths under Davy Condon. She reappeared in April to win the Duggan Profiles Novice Hurdle at Gowran Park, this time ridden by Ruby Walsh. She was then stepped up in company and ran in the Grade 1 Punchestown Champion 4YO Hurdle, where she finished ninth to Won In The Dark. She returned to France to run in the Prix Alain du Breil at Auteuil, where she finished third (just behind stablemate and future Champion Hurdler Hurricane Fly) before being put away for the season.

=== 2009 season ===
Quevega did not reappear for eight months before making her belated debut in a two-mile four furlong hurdle race at Punchestown. Sent off the 4/5 favourite, she won easily by four lengths under Ruby Walsh. The following month, she headed to the Cheltenham Festival to run in the newly established David Nicholson Mares’ Hurdle over two and a half miles. Also in the field was the 2008 winner United and Ascot Hurdle winner Chomba Womba. Racing in midfield, Quevega made rapid progress from the third last hurdle and stormed up the hill to win impressively by fourteen lengths, giving Walsh his first winner of the week.

Quevega then took on the top two mile hurdlers in the Punchestown Champion Hurdle over two miles, but could only finish third to Grade 1 winner Solwhit and Champion Hurdle victor Punjabi.

She was again sent to Auteuil and ran in the Prix la Barka, but could only finish ninth to Portal's Toy and suffered an injury afterwards.

=== 2010 season ===
Quevega did not race again until the Cheltenham Festival the next year, where she again ran in the Mares’ Race. This time she faced Carole's Legacy, a classy mare who regularly faced geldings and Voler La Vedette, who had previously beaten Supreme Novices Hurdle winner Go Native in a Grade 3 race. Although the winning distance was not as far as the previous year, Quevega still won with complete authority by over four lengths, after making her move approaching the last flight. Jockey Ruby Walsh described as "a great mare".

She next ran in the Grade 1 World Series Hurdle over three miles at the Punchestown Festival. Under Paul Townend (deputising for the injured Ruby Walsh), she comfortably beat Bensalem and stablemate Mourad by three lengths.

=== 2011 season ===
Quevega once again made her seasonal debut at the Cheltenham Festival when attempting to win a third consecutive Mares Hurdle despite being “a gallop short” according to her trainer. Her sternest opponent was probably Warfield Mares' Hurdle winner Sparky May, but Quevega showed she was different class in winning by ten lengths virtually unextended.

A return to Punchestown saw her win a second World Series Hurdle despite a bad mistake at the last, beating Mourad one and a quarter lengths with Coral Cup winner Carlito Brigante third and Voler La Vedette in fourth.

=== 2012 season ===
Quevega made a bid for a four-timer in the Mares Hurdle off a similar prolonged break as the previous two years, and again was rated a short priced favourite to do so. In the race she quickened to lead approaching the last to beat Kentford Grey Lady by four lengths.

This year, the World Series Hurdle saw a clash between Quevega and her old rival Voler La Vedette, who had won the Hatton's Grace Hurdle that season and was fresh off an excellent second place to Big Buck's in the World Hurdle at Cheltenham. The race boiled down to a duel between the two mares approaching the straight, but Quevega stayed on the best to defeat her opponent by over five lengths, with Mourad once again being placed. Trainer Willie Mullins described her as “a real good mare”.

=== 2013 season ===
After reigning World Hurdler Big Buck's suffered a season-ending injury, there was speculation that Quevega might attempt to win that race rather than go for a five-timer in the Mares Hurdle and she was made favourite accordingly. However, Mullins confirmed that the mares’ race was her target and Quevega once again lined up on the back of a long absence and as an odds on favourite. Also in the field was the Nicky Henderson trained Une Artiste, who had won the Fred Winter Juvenile Handicap Hurdle the previous year. The race did not go smoothly for Quevega, as she was crowded in and stumbled at the top of the hill, losing her position as the field quickened. She progressed to fifth place approaching the last, before coming with a late burst to beat the French mare Sirene D’Ainay in the final half furlong. In winning the race for a fifth consecutive year, she equalled the feat of Golden Miller, who won five Cheltenham Gold Cups in the 1930s.

=== 2014 season ===
At the Cheltenham festival, Quevega starting as the 8-11 favourite won her sixth straight Mares' Hurdle ridden by Ruby Walsh. With this win, Quevega became the first horse in the history to win at six consecutive Cheltenham Festivals. On May 1 Quevega attempted to win the World Series Hurdle at Punchestown for the fifth straight year but despite rallying over the last, she went down by a length and a quarter to 20/1 shot Jetson, ridden by Davy Russell. Trainer Willie Mullins confirmed after the race that the mare had run for the last time and had been retired.

== Retirement ==
On 15 May 2015 Quevega gave birth to her first foal, a filly by Beat Hollow. Princess Vega won one race before being retired to stud. On 6 March 2017 Quevega gave birth to a second foal, a colt by Walk In The Park, who was named Facile Vega. In 2022 Facile Vega won in the Champion Bumper at the Cheltenham Festival. By the end of the 2022/23 season, he had won another three Grade 1 races. Facile Vega was followed in 2018 by a full-sister Aurora Vega, who won the Grade 1 Honeysuckle Mares Novice Hurdle in 2025. Quevega then foaled a Camelot filly in 2019, an Australia filly in 2020 and another Walk In The Park colt in 2022.

== See also ==
- Repeat winners of horse races
- List of racehorses
