= Honeysuckle (horse) =

British-bred racehorse

- Sire: Sulamani
- Grandsire: Hernando
- Dam: First Royal
- Damsire: Lando
- Sex: Mare
- Foaled: 28 April 2014
- Country: United Kingdom
- Colour: Bay
- Breeder: G W Guy
- Owner: Kenny Alexander
- Trainer: Henry de Bromhead
- Record: 19:17-1-1
- Earnings: £1,317,181

Major wins
- Solerina Mares Novice Hurdle (2019); Mares Novice Hurdle Championship Final (2019); Hatton's Grace Hurdle (2019, 2020, 2021); Irish Champion Hurdle (2020, 2021, 2022); David Nicholson Mares' Hurdle (2020, 2023); Champion Hurdle (2021, 2022); Punchestown Champion Hurdle (2021, 2022); Timeform rating: 165
- Last updated on 15 March 2025

Honeysuckle (foaled 28 April 2014) is a British-bred, Irish-trained Thoroughbred racehorse who competed in National Hunt races. She won seventeen of her nineteen races across five seasons, including two Champion Hurdles, two Mares' Hurdles, three Irish Champion Hurdles and two Punchestown Champion Hurdles. She was trained by Henry de Bromhead and ridden by Rachael Blackmore in all her races under rules. She was retired at the age of nine in 2023 and had her first foal in March 2024.

== Background ==
Honeysuckle is a bay mare with no white markings bred in England by Dr Geoffrey Guy. She was sold to Mark O'Hare as a three-year-old for €9,500 at the Tattersalls Ireland Derby Sale. At the Goffs Punchestown Sale in 2018, having won a Point-to-point maiden race for four-year-old mares at Dromahane, she was purchased for €100,000 by Peter Molony of Rathmore Stud. She entered the ownership of Kenneth Alexander and was sent into training with de Bromhead at Knockeen, County Waterford.

She was sired by Sulamani, a top-class international turf horse whose wins included the Prix du Jockey Club, Dubai Sheema Classic, Arlington Million, Juddmonte International Stakes and Canadian International Stakes. The best of his progeny included Mastery and Rule The World. Honeysuckle's dam First Royal showed modest racing ability, winning one minor race from ten attempts in her native Germany. First Royal's grand-dam First Smile was a half-sister to the German St. Leger winner First Hello.

== Racing career ==
=== 2018/2019 National Hunt season ===
Honeysuckle made her debut under National Hunt rules on 14 November when she started the 9/10 favourite for a mares' Novice Hurdle over two and a half miles at Fairyhouse. Ridden as in all of her subsequent races by Rachael Blackmore she disputed the lead from the start, drew away over the last two flights of hurdles and won "easily" by twelve lengths from Moskovite and six others. The mare was then moved up in class for the Listed Boreen Belle Mares Novice Hurdle over two miles at Thurles Racecourse on 22 December and recorded another easy victory, leading from the start and coming home three and a quarter lengths clear of Sassy Diva.

The Grade 3 Solerina Mares Novice Hurdle over two and a quarter miles at Fairyhouse in January saw Honeysuckle go off the 6/4 favourite against six opponents. After racing in third place she took the lead approaching the second last flight and extended her advantage to win by six lengths from Western Victory despite a minor jumping error at the last obstacle. The mare missed an intended run at the Cheltenham Festival after performing poorly in training gallops; de Bromhead reported that she "went a bit flat and we weren't happy with her". For her final appearance of the season Honeysuckle was elevated to the highest class on 21 April at Fairyhouse and started 6/4 favourite for the Grade 1 Mares Novice Hurdle Championship Final, with the best fancied of her 21 opponents being the Dawn Run Mares' Novices' Hurdle winner Eglantine du Seuil. After racing just behind the leaders Honeysuckle went to the front after the third last and won by five and a half lengths from Elfile with Eglantine du Seuil three lengths back in third. After the race de Bromhead said "She's some five-year-old and has achieved so much already... and is a really exciting mare. Rachael said she just wanted to keep it simple. She got a lovely position and had her jumping great. I said to her beforehand that you don't need to drive on too early, but then I saw her taking a pull after the second last and said you can drive on now all right!"

=== 2019/2020 National Hunt season ===
On her first appearance of the new season, Honeysuckle was matched against male opposition for the first time in a two and a half mile hurdle at Fairyhouse on 12 November when she started the odds-on favourite and won by eleven lengths from the Navan Novice Hurdle winner Easy Game. Nineteen days later, over the same course and distance, the mare was stepped back up to Grade I class for the Hatton's Grace Hurdle and went off the 9/10 favourite in a six-runner field which included Apple's Jade, Bacardys (Champion Novice Hurdle), Penhill and Killultagh Vic (Irish Daily Mirror Novice Hurdle). Honeysuckle raced in third place behind Killultagh Vic and Apple's Jade before taking the lead at the penultimate flight and drawing away to win by nine lengths from Bacardys. After the race Blackmore commented "She’s very special and this was a big step up today. Sitting on her back is a privileged position to be in... I hope she loves the place across the water as well!" while de Bromhead said "She was brilliant and even I could enjoy it a bit. I couldn’t believe it when Rachael took a pull on her turning in considering the calibre of race she was in... She’s grown and developed over the summer".

The Irish Champion Hurdle at Leopardstown Racecourse on 1 February saw Honeysuckle dropped back in distance to two miles and start the 8/11 favourite. Her eight opponents included Sharjah (Matheson Hurdle), Petit Mouchoir (winner of the race in 2017), Supasundae (Aintree Hurdle) and Aramon (Future Champions Novice Hurdle). The mare raced in second place behind Petit Mouchoir for most of the way before taking the lead approaching the last obstacle. An awkward jump at the last allowed Petit Mouchoir to briefly regain the lead but Honeysuckle rallied strongly and held off the challenge of the outsider Darver Star in the final strides to win by half a length. Blackmore said "She's got a massive heart and a massive will to do it... She's always done everything I've asked her to do and I wasn't too worried about coming back in trip."

Honeysuckle made her first appearance outside Ireland on 10 March when she contested the David Nicholson Mares' Hurdle at the Cheltenham Festival. For the first time she did not start favourite, going off the 9/4 second choice in the betting behind the French Champion Hurdle winner Benie de Dieux. The other seven runners included Roksana and Stormy Ireland who had finished first and second in the race in 2019. Honeysuckle was in contention from the start as Stormy Ireland set the pace, and moved up on the inside to take the lead on the final turn only to be challenged by Benie des Dieux. The two favourites drew away from their rivals with Honeysuckle staying on well to win by half a length with a gap of six and a half lengths back to Elfile in third. De Bromhead said "She really toughed it out up the hill. She gets from A to B over her hurdles and that's it. We never try to find out too much at home. She really battled and threw herself at the last. Whatever about the mare, the lady on her back is something special - the pair of them are brilliant."

=== 2020/2021 National Hunt season ===
Honeysuckle started the season with another victory in the Hatton's Grace Hurdle, beating Ronald Pump by half a length. Blackmore said "She was jumping her hurdles a bit better and is maturing. She might have been just feeling it a bit on her first run after the last, but she gets the job done every day." She then won her second consecutive Irish Champion Hurdle with a ten length victory over Abacadabras. Her next race was the Champion Hurdle at Cheltenham, where she started 11/10 favourite and won by six and a half lengths from Sharjah. De Bromhead praised the mare and jockey "They have got a great relationship but Rachael is a brilliant rider on any horse and Honeysuckle is just deadly. It’s a perfect storm." Honeysuckle completed the season with a win in the Punchestown Champion Hurdle, again beating Sharjah into second place.

=== 2021/2022 National Hunt season ===
Honeysuckle ran in the same four races as the previous season, starting as odds-on favourite in each race and winning on each occasion. In the Hatton's Grace Hurdle she again beat Ronald Pump, this time by 8 lengths; in the Irish Champion Hurdle she beat Zanahiyr by six and a half lengths; in the Champion Hurdle she beat Epatante by three and a half lengths; in the Punchestown Champion Hurdle she beat Echoes In Rain by three lengths. Interviewed for Racing Post before the 2022 Cheltenham Festival, former champion jockey Peter Scudamore said that Honeysuckle was "right up there with the greatest racehorses we've seen", while Richard Johnson, also a former champion jockey, said: "She's right up there with the best and her record alone – to have never been beaten – in itself is unique..." Honeysuckle's victory in the Champion Hurdle at the Cheltenham Festival gave her a total of twelve Grade 1 wins, a feat surpassed since 2003 (as of 2023) only by Hurricane Fly and Kauto Star.

=== 2022/2023 National Hunt season and retirement ===
In November, Honeysuckle suffered the first defeat of her career when she came third behind Teahupoo and Klassical Dream in the Hatton's Grace Hurdle. In her next race, the Irish Champion Hurdle in February, she was beaten into second place by State Man. After the race there was talk or retirement for the nine-year-old mare, or perhaps a final appearance in the Mares' Hurdle at the Cheltenham Festival. Her owner said "“She ran her heart out but it wasn't enough and age catches up with everyone. Is she as good as she was – obviously not – but she's been an amazing horse to own and she just couldn't do it today.... I'll leave it to them [de Bromhead and Blackmore]. If they want to retire her, I'll retire her. I just want to get her out in one piece." In the event, Honeysuckle was entered in the Mares' Hurdle, which she had won in 2020. Starting 9/4 joint favourite with Marie's Rock in a field of nine, she approached the last level with Love Envoi and went one and a half lengths clear on the run-in to achieve her fourth victory in four races at the Cheltenham Festival. Her trainer commented that it was a fairytale ending to her racing career.

== Honours ==
In 2023 the Mares Novice Hurdle Championship Final at Fairyhouse was re-named the Honeysuckle Mares Novice Hurdle in her honour.

== Breeding record ==
Honeysuckle gave birth to her first foal, a filly sired by Walk In The Park, on 29 March 2024.

== Pedigree ==
Pedigree of Honeysuckle (GB), bay mare, 2014
Sire Sulamani (IRE) 1999	Hernando (FR); 1990	Niniski (USA)	Nijinsky (CAN)
Sire Sulamani (IRE) 1999	Hernando (FR); 1990	Niniski (USA)	Virginia Hills
Sire Sulamani (IRE) 1999	Hernando (FR); 1990	Whakilyric (USA)	Miswaki
Sire Sulamani (IRE) 1999	Hernando (FR); 1990	Whakilyric (USA)	Lyrism
Sire Sulamani (IRE) 1999	Soul Dream (USA); 1990	Alleged	Hoist the Flag
Sire Sulamani (IRE) 1999	Soul Dream (USA); 1990	Alleged	Princess Pout
Sire Sulamani (IRE) 1999	Soul Dream (USA); 1990	Normia (GB)	Northfields (USA)
Sire Sulamani (IRE) 1999	Soul Dream (USA); 1990	Normia (GB)	Mia Pola (FR)
Dam First Royal (GER) 2003	Lando (GER); 1990	Acatenango	Surumu
Dam First Royal (GER) 2003	Lando (GER); 1990	Acatenango	Aggravate (GB)
Dam First Royal (GER) 2003	Lando (GER); 1990	Laurea (IRE)	Sharpman
Dam First Royal (GER) 2003	Lando (GER); 1990	Laurea (IRE)	Licata (GER)
Dam First Royal (GER) 2003	First Neba (FR); 1998	Nebos (GER)	Caro (IRE)
Dam First Royal (GER) 2003	First Neba (FR); 1998	Nebos (GER)	Nostrana
Dam First Royal (GER) 2003	First Neba (FR); 1998	First Smile (GB)	Surumu (GER)
Dam First Royal (GER) 2003	First Neba (FR); 1998	First Smile (GB)	First Love (GER) (Family: 16-c)
