= Supasundae =

British-bred Thoroughbred racehorse

- Racing silks of Alan & Ann Potts
- Sire: Galileo
- Dam: Distinctive Look
- Damsire: Danehill
- Sex: Gelding
- Foaled: 31 January 2010
- Country: Great Britain
- Colour: Bay
- Breeder: Newsells Park Stud
- Owner: Ann & Alan Potts Limited
- Trainer: Mrs John Harrington
- Record: 31:8,9,2
- Earnings: £769,661

Major wins
- Irish Champion Hurdle (2018); Punchestown Champion Hurdle (2018); Aintree Hurdle (2019); Coral Cup (2017)

Supasundae is a British thoroughbred racehorse that won multiple Grade 1 races across Great Britain and Ireland in the colours of owners Ann & Alan Potts.

== Career ==
Supasundae was foaled in January 2010 and sold at Tattersalls October Yearlings sale in 2011 for 195,000gns.

His first race came at Wetherby for trainer/owner Tim Fitzgerald with a win in a National Hunt Flat Race. Days later he was listed for sale at the Goffs Newbury Sale 2014. Training was switched to Andrew Balding and ownership to Northern Line Racing Limited. Again, Supasundae would win a Bumper this time at Ascot beating future Grade 1 winners Thistlecrack and Yanworth.

Notable national hunt owners Ann & Alan Potts acquired Supasundae and in 2015 ahead of the Champion Bumper at Cheltenham, training switched again to Henry De Bromhead. The first success for his new owners came in December at Leopardstown in a Maiden Hurdle. Supasundae returned to Cheltenham for the 2016 Festival but finished only 7th in the Supreme Novices Hurdle. Following defeat at the Punchestown Festival the following month, training was switched again to Jessica Harrington.

The first win for the new trainer partnership came at Punchestown with jockey Robbie Power. Power would be in the saddle at the 2017 Cheltenham Festival taking victory in the Coral Cup, before finishing second in the Liverpool Hurdle a month later. Shortly after this run, owner Alan Potts passed away. Supasundae would continue running in his late owners colours for the remainder of his career.

Returning from the summer break, Supasundae collected his first Grade 1 victory at Leopardstown winning the 2018 Champion Hurdle. He would finish second in the Cheltenham Stayers Hurdle in March and again in the Aintree Hurdle in April. Success however came back in Ireland winning the 2017 Punchestown Champion Hurdle.

Supasundae finished second in three Grade 1 races in a row in Ireland from December 2018 to February 2019, before a lacklustre display in the Stayers Hurdle at Cheltenham finishing only seventh. Success came at Aintree with victory in the Grade 1 Aintree Hurdle, a race he finished second in just the year prior.

After failing to retain his crown in the Punchestown Champion Hurdle, and finishing last in both the Morgiana Hurdle at Punchestown and Hattons Grace Hurdle at Fairyhouse, Supasundae was retired.
