= Solerina Mares Novice Hurdle =

Irish National Hunt hurdle race

Solerina Mares Novice Hurdle
2026
Oldschool Outlaw	Place De La Nation	Carry On Heidi

Previous years
2025
Aurora Vega	Dream On Baby	Beauforts Storm
2024
Jade De Grugy	A Penny A Hundred	Look To The West
2023
Ashroe Diamond	Jetara	Halka Du Tabert
2022
Allegorie De Vassy	Brandy Love	Lunar Display
2021
Roseys Hollow	Royal Kahala	Gauloise

2020-2011
2020
Minella Melody	Colreevy	Dolcita
2019
Honeysuckle	Western Victory	Tintangle
2018
Laurina	Alletrix	Dawn Shadow
2017
Shattered Love	Forge Meadow	Miss Eyecatcher
2016
Limini	Cashelard Lady	Whistle Dixie
2015
Morning Run	Lyrical Theatre	Baie Des Iles
2014
Gitane Du Berlais	Vicky De L'oasis	Romantic Fashion
2012
Ceol Rua	Shadow Eile	Espresso Lady
2011
Our Girl Salley	Belle Brook	Lonesome Dove

The Solerina Mares Novice Hurdle is a Grade 3 National Hunt hurdle race in Ireland which is open to mares aged four years or older. It is run at Fairyhouse over a distance of 2 miles and 2 furlongs (3,621 metres) and during the race there are ten hurdles to be jumped. The race is for novice hurdlers, and it is scheduled to take place each year in late January or early February.

The race was first run in 2011 and was awarded Grade 3 status in 2014.

In 2014 the race was renamed in honour of Solerina, the Irish mare who won 22 races between 2002 and 2006. The race is currently sponsored by EcoFriendly Cups.

== Records ==
Most successful jockey (4 wins):

- Paul Townend - Glens Melody (2013), Gitane Du Berlais (2014), Laurina (2018), Aurora Vega (2025)

Most successful trainer (10 wins):

- Willie Mullins – Ceol Rua (2012), Glens Melody (2013), Gitane Du Berlais (2014), Morning Run (2015), Limini (2016), Laurina (2018), Allegorie De Vassy (2022), Ashroe Diamond (2023), Jade De Grugy (2024), Aurora Vega (2025)

== Winners ==
Year	Winner	Age	Jockey	Trainer
2011	Our Girl Salley	6	Barry Geraghty	Mrs Prunella Dobbs
2012	Ceol Rua	7	Ruby Walsh	Willie Mullins
2013	Glens Melody^{[a]}	5	Paul Townend	Willie Mullins
2014	Gitane Du Berlais	4	Paul Townend	Willie Mullins
2015	Morning Run	6	Ruby Walsh	Willie Mullins
2016	Limini	5	Danny Mullins	Willie Mullins
2017	Shattered Love	6	Jack Kennedy	Gordon Elliott
2018	Laurina	5	Paul Townend	Willie Mullins
2019	Honeysuckle	5	Rachael Blackmore	Henry De Bromhead
2020	Minella Melody	6	Rachael Blackmore	Henry De Bromhead
2021	Roseys Hollow	7	Mark Walsh	Jonathan Sweeney
2022	Allegorie De Vassy	5	Sean O'Keeffe	Willie Mullins
2023	Ashroe Diamond	6	Danny Mullins	Willie Mullins
2024	Jade De Grugy	5	Brian Hayes	Willie Mullins
2025	Aurora Vega	7	Paul Townend	Willie Mullins
2026	Oldschool Outlaw	6	Mark Walsh	Gordon Elliott

^{a} The 2013 running took place at Leopardstown after the original fixture was abandoned due to waterlogging.

== See also ==
- Horseracing in Ireland
- List of Irish National Hunt races
