= Lossiemouth (horse) =

Thoroughbred racehorse

- Sire: Great Pretender
- Grandsire: King's Theatre
- Dam: Mariner's Light
- Damsire: Gentlewave
- Sex: Mare
- Foaled: 23 March 2019
- Country: France
- Colour: Grey
- Breeder: Sarl Elevage Des Vallons & Ian Kellit
- Owner: Mrs S Ricci
- Trainer: Willie Mullins
- Record: 20: 16-3-0
- Earnings: £1,400,739

Major wins
- Triumph Hurdle (2023); Champion Four Year Old Hurdle (2023); David Nicholson Mares' Hurdle (2024, 2025); Mares Champion Hurdle (2024); Hatton's Grace Hurdle (2024); Aintree Hurdle (2025); Morgiana Hurdle (2025, 2026); December Hurdle (2025); Champion Hurdle (2026); Punchestown Champion Hurdle (2026)
- Last updated on 21 November 2026

Lossiemouth (foaled 23 March 2019) is a French-bred Thoroughbred racehorse. Trained in Ireland by Willie Mullins, she competes over hurdles and, as of November 2026, has won twelve Grade 1 races, including four at the Cheltenham Festival.

== Background ==
Lossiemouth is a grey mare bred in France jointly by Ian Kellit and the Elevage des Vallons stud. Her dam, Mariner's Light, won once on the flat and is, through her dam Lady Glitters, a half-sister to the 2019 Queen Anne Stakes winner Lord Glitters. Her sire, Great Pretender, was a listed winner both on the flat and over hurdles. Lossiemouth was named after the town in Scotland where Kellit's partner Susan Haynes Kellit had been to school. Unsold at €14,000 as a yearling, the filly went into training with Yannick Fouin. She made her racecourse debut on 3 April 2022 at Auteuil in the Prix Geographie, a hurdle race over 1 mile 7 furlongs for three-year-old fillies who had never raced over obstacles. Leading from the first hurdle, she won by 10 lengths in spite of a mistake at the last that nearly unseated her jockey, Jeremy Da Silva. After her impressive debut, Lossiemouth was sold to Rich Ricci and went into training with Willie Mullins in Ireland.

== Racing career ==
=== 2022/23 National Hunt season ===
Lossiemouth's first start for her new owner and trainer was the Grade 3 Bar One Racing Juvenile Hurdle over 2 miles at Fairyhouse on 4 December 2022. Ridden by Danny Mullins, she started at 3/1 second favourite and won easily by four lengths, beating stablemate and favourite Zarak the Brave. She started as odds-on favourite in her next race, the Grade 2 Juvenile Hurdle at Leopardstown on Boxing Day. Ridden by Paul Townend, who would become her regular jockey, she again won easily, beating Gala Marceau by seven-and-a-half lengths. Her next appearance was at the Dublin Racing Festival on 4 February 2023, where she was odds-on favourite to win the Grade 1 Spring Juvenile Hurdle. Well positioned on the inside just behind the leaders, she was impeded by stablemate Jourdefete after the third last and dropped to the back of the field. Townend had to take her round the outside into the home straight, where she managed to make up ground but failed to catch the winner, Gala Marceau, by two lengths. Lossiemouth's reputation was undamaged by her unlucky loss at Leopardstown, and she started as 11/8 favourite for the Triumph Hurdle at the Cheltenham Festival in March, leading home a 1-2-3-4 for Mullins, with Gala Marceau in second place. After the race, the trainer said: "[Townend] thought she was actually idling come up the straight and thinks there is a little bit more in the tank – she looks a star mare. But for the traffic problems in Leopardstown she'd be unbeaten for us." Lossiemouth was only the fifth filly to win the Triumph Hurdle. In her final appearance of the season, she beat Zarak the Brave by one-and-a-half lengths in the Champion Four Year Old Hurdle at the Punchestown Festival in April.

=== 2023/24 National Hunt season ===
After a nine-month break, Lossiemouth returned to the racecourse in January 2024 to contest the Grade 2 International Hurdle at Cheltenham, winning easily by nine-and-a-half lengths from Love Envoi. In her next race, the Mares' Hurdle at the Cheltenham Festival, she ran over two-and-a-half miles for the first time. Starting as odds-on favourite in a field of eleven, she won by three lengths from Tellmesomethinggirl. After the race her owner said: "Paul did exactly what he told us he was going to do, which was hang back and pick them off. He seemed in the perfect position the whole race and she is just fantastic." Her third and final race of the season was the Mares Champion Hurdle at the Punchestown Festival, where she finished seven lengths ahead of Gala Marceau to bring her tally of Grade 1 victories to four.

=== 2024/25 National Hunt season ===
Lossiemouth's first race of the season was the Hatton's Grace Hurdle at Fairyhouse on 1 December 2023. Starting as odds-on favourite and the only mare in a field of four, she recovered from a mistake at the fourth last to win easily, with Teahupoo, winner of the two previous races, nearly four lengths behind her in second place. On Boxing Day at Kempton, she was no match for Constitution Hill and was beaten two-and-a-half lengths into second place. She then started odds-on favourite for the Irish Champion Hurdle at Leopardstown. With Townend on second favourite, stablemate State Man, Lossiemouth was ridden by Danny Mullins. She fell at the fourth last, leaving State Man to win for the third year running. Although she had been campaigned for the Champion Hurdle at Cheltenham, Lossiemouth was switched to the Mares' Hurdle, which she won for the second time. The season ended with victory in the Aintree Hurdle, after favourite Constitution Hill had fallen at the second out.

=== 2025/26 National Hunt season ===
The season started for Lossiemouth in November with an nineteen length win in the Morgiana Hurdle at Punchestown, making all in a field of four. She then faced stiffer opposition in the December Hurdle, but held off Brighterdaysahead to win by a length and claim her ninth Grade 1 victory. Her next race was the Irish Champion Hurdle, in which she started odds-on favourite but was beaten into second place by Brighterdaysahead. A few days before the Cheltenham Festival, her connections decided to run her in the 2026 Champion Hurdle and not the Mares' Hurdle. Wearing cheekpieces for the first time and starting as 7/5 favourite, Lossiemouth tracked Brighterdaysahead during the race before taking the lead on the home turn and finishing six and a half lengths clear of her old rival, with The New Lion in third place and defending champion Golden Ace in fifth. It was her fourth consecutive victory at the Cheltenham Festival and her tenth Grade 1 victory. "To win the Champion Hurdle definitely outranks everything else she's done", said her trainer after the race. After her return to Ireland, Lossiemouth was paraded in the village of Leighlinbridge along with her stablemates, Cheltenham Gold Cup winner Gaelic Warrior and Queen Mother Champion Chase winner Il Etait Temps.

Lossiemouth finished the season with victory in the Punchestown Champion Hurdle, bringing her total of Grade 1 wins to eleven. Starting as odds-on favourite, she went clear approaching the last to beat runner-up Golden Ace by five lengths.

=== 2026/27 National Hunt season ===
The seven-year-old began the season with a second consecutive victory in the Morgania Hurdle. She made all in a field of four and won easily by eleven lengths, with Townend having barely moved in the saddle.
