= 2022 Cheltenham Gold Cup =

Horse race in Britain

- Cheltenham Gold Cup
- Location: Cheltenham Racecourse
- Date: 18 March 2022
- Winning horse: A Plus Tard
- Starting price: 3-1
- Jockey: Rachael Blackmore
- Trainer: Henry de Bromhead
- Owner: Cheveley Park Stud
- Conditions: Good to soft

The 2022 Cheltenham Gold Cup (known as the Boodles Gold Cup for sponsorship reasons) was the 94th annual running of the Cheltenham Gold Cup horse race and was held at Cheltenham Racecourse, Gloucestershire, England, on 18 March 2022.

The race was won by the 3-1 favourite A Plus Tard, owned by the Cheveley Park Stud, trained in Ireland by Henry de Bromhead and ridden by Rachael Blackmore. Blackmore became the first female jockey to ride the winner of the Cheltenham Gold Cup. The 2021 winner, Minella Indo, was second, and Protektorat finished third.

== Result ==
Source -

	Dist	Horse	Age	Jockey	Trainer ^{†}	SP
1		A Plus Tard	8	Rachael Blackmore	Henry de Bromhead (IRE)	3/1F
2	15	Minella Indo	9	Robbie Power	Henry de Bromhead (IRE)	7/1
3	2 1/2	Protektorat	7	Harry Skelton	Dan Skelton	10/1
4	s.h.	Galvin	8	Davy Russell	Gordon Elliott (IRE)	100/30
5	nk	Royale Pagaille	8	Charlie Deutsch	Venetia Williams	20/1
6	2 3/4	Al Boum Photo	10	Paul Townend	Willie Mullins (IRE)	6/1
7	1	Asterion Forlonge	8	Bryan Cooper	Willie Mullins (IRE)	22/1
8	9 1/2	Santini	10	Nick Scholfield	Polly Gundry	66/1
9	30	Aye Right	9	Callum Bewdley	Harriet Graham & Gary Rutherford	80/1
PU		Tornado Flyer	9	Danny Mullins	Willie Mullins (IRE)	9/1
PU		Chantry House	8	Nico de Boinville	Nicky Henderson	16/1

* The distances between the horses are shown in lengths or shorter. s.h. = short-head. nk = neck.
† Trainers are based in Great Britain unless indicated. PU = pulled-up
