= 2022 Champion Hurdle =

92nd Champion Hurdle
- Champion Hurdle
- Location: Cheltenham Racecourse
- Date: 15 March 2022
- Winning horse: Honeysuckle
- Jockey: Rachael Blackmore
- Trainer: Henry de Bromhead

The 2022 Champion Hurdle was a horse race held at Cheltenham Racecourse on Tuesday 15 March 2022. It was the 92nd running of the Champion Hurdle.

The race was won for the second year in a row by the 8/11 favourite Honeysuckle, ridden by Rachael Blackmore and trained by Henry de Bromhead.

== Race details ==
- Sponsor: Unibet
- Purse:
- Going:Good to soft
- Distance:2 miles 87 yards
- Number of runners: 10
- Winner's time: 3:50.13
