= 2021 Champion Hurdle =

91st Champion Hurdle
- Champion Hurdle
- Location: Cheltenham Racecourse
- Date: 16 March 2021
- Winning horse: Honeysuckle
- Jockey: Rachael Blackmore
- Trainer: Henry de Bromhead

The 2021 Champion Hurdle was a horse race held at Cheltenham Racecourse on Tuesday 16 March 2021. It was the 91st running of the Champion Hurdle.

The race was won by the 11/10 favourite Honeysuckle, ridden by Rachael Blackmore and trained by Henry de Bromhead. The 2020 runner-uo Sharjah filled second place again, six and a half lengths behind the winner, and the 2020 champion Epatante finished in third place. Blackmore's victory made her the first female jockey to win the Champion Hurdle.

== Race details ==
- Sponsor: Unibet
- Purse:
- Going:Soft
- Distance:2 miles 87 yards
- Number of runners: 10
- Winner's time: 3:54.63
