= A Plus Tard =

French-bred Thoroughbred racehorse

- Racing Colours of Cheveley Park Stud
- Sire: Kapgarde
- Dam: Turboka
- Damsire: Kahyasi
- Sex: Gelding
- Foaled: 6 February, 2014
- Country: France
- Colour: Bay
- Breeder: Mme Henri Devin
- Owner: Cheveley Park Stud
- Trainer: Henry De Bromhead
- Record: 23:8,8,4
- Earnings: ££957,124

Major wins
- Cheltenham Gold Cup (2022); Betfair Chase (2021); Savills Chase (2020); Paddy's Reward Club Chase (2019)

A Plus Tard (foaled 6 February 2014) is a retired French-bred thoroughbred racehorse who competed in National Hunt racing.

== Career ==
A Plus Tard was bred in France by Mme Henri Devin and raced five times in the country in 2017 and 2018, never finishing outside of the top three. A Plus Tard won twice, at Saint-Brieuc and Auteuil. In May 2018, A Plus Tard was gelded and in October of that year the horse was sold privately to Cheveley Park Stud and moved to Henry De Bromhead in Ireland.

A Plus Tard made his debut for the new owner and trainer combination at Gowran Park in November 2018, finishing second in a 2m4f chase. The following month, taking victory at Naas before finishing second in a Grade 3 at Punchestown. A Plus Tard had a first Cheltenham Festival victory in March 2019, winning the Close Brothers Novices' Handicap Chase. He would finish third in the Grade 1 Dooley Insurance Group Champion Novice Chase the following month at Punchestown.

A Plus Tard won his first Grade 1 at Leopardstown in December 2019, in the Paddy's Rewards Club "Loyalty's Dead, Live For Rewards" Chase. A return to Cheltenham in March yielded third in the Ryanair Chase behind eventual winner, Min. In December 2020, A Plus Tard returned to Leopardstown and won the Grade 1 Savills Chase before making a Cheltenham Gold Cup debut finishing second behind Minella Indo.

After a lengthy off-season break, A Plus Tard returned at Haydock in November winning the Betfair Chase. At Leopardstown, he was beaten second in the Savills Chase by Galvin. In March, A Plus Tard returned to Cheltenham and, ridden by Rachael Blackmore, won the Cheltenham Gold Cup by 15 lengths from Minella Indo. With no wins in his next four starts, his retirement was announced in January 2024.

== Pedigree ==
Pedigree of A Plus Tard (FR), bay gelding, 2014
| Sire Kapgarde (FR) 1999 | Garde Royale (IRE); 1980 | Mill Reef (USA) | Never Bend |
| Sire Kapgarde (FR) 1999 | Garde Royale (IRE); 1980 | Mill Reef (USA) | Milan Mill |
| Sire Kapgarde (FR) 1999 | Garde Royale (IRE); 1980 | Royal Way (FR) | Sicambre |
| Sire Kapgarde (FR) 1999 | Garde Royale (IRE); 1980 | Royal Way (FR) | Right Away |
| Sire Kapgarde (FR) 1999 | Kaprika (FR); 1989 | Cadoudal | Green Dancer (USA) |
| Sire Kapgarde (FR) 1999 | Kaprika (FR); 1989 | Cadoudal | Come To Sea (IRE) |
| Sire Kapgarde (FR) 1999 | Kaprika (FR); 1989 | Lady Corteira | Carvin |
| Sire Kapgarde (FR) 1999 | Kaprika (FR); 1989 | Lady Corteira | Madrusa |
| Dam Turboka (FR) 1997 | Kahyasi (IRE); 1985 | Ile de Bourbon (USA) | Nijinsky (CAN) |
| Dam Turboka (FR) 1997 | Kahyasi (IRE); 1985 | Ile de Bourbon (USA) | Roseliere (FR) |
| Dam Turboka (FR) 1997 | Kahyasi (IRE); 1985 | Kadissya (USA) | Blushing Groom (FR) |
| Dam Turboka (FR) 1997 | Kahyasi (IRE); 1985 | Kadissya (USA) | Kalkeen (IRE) |
| Dam Turboka (FR) 1997 | Turbotiere (FR); 1995 | Turgeon (USA) | Caro (IRE) |
| Dam Turboka (FR) 1997 | Turbotiere (FR); 1995 | Turgeon (USA) | Reiko (FR) |
| Dam Turboka (FR) 1997 | Turbotiere (FR); 1995 | Victoria Dee | Rex Magna |
| Dam Turboka (FR) 1997 | Turbotiere (FR); 1995 | Victoria Dee | Very Smart (Family 1-h) |
