= Centenary Novices' Handicap Chase =

Steeplechase horse race in Britain

- Class: Premier Handicap
- Location: Sandown Park Racecourse; Esher, England
- Inaugurated: 2005
- Race type: Steeplechase
- Sponsor: Paddy Power
- Website: Sandown Park

Race information
- Distance: 2m 4f 10y (4,033 metres)
- Surface: Turf
- Track: Right-handed
- Qualification: Five-years-old and up
- Weight: Handicap
- Purse: £40,000 (2021); 1st: £22,584

Centenary Novices' Handicap Chase
2024
Scarface	Invincible Nao	Terresita

Previous years
2023
Hudson De Grugy	Quel Destin	No Risk Des Flos
2022
Killer Kane	Flic Ou Voyou	Dorking Lad
2021
Farinet	Up The Straight	Lust For Glory

2020-2011
2020
Imperial Aura	Galvin	Hold The Note
2019
A Plus Tard	Tower Bridge	Ben Dundee
2018
Mister Whitaker	Rather Be	Rocklander
2017
Tully East	Gold Present	Two Taffs
2016
Ballyalton	Bouvreuil	Double Shuffle
2015
Irish Cavalier	Thomas Crapper	Generous Ransom
2014
Present View	Attaglance	Pendra
2013
Rajdhani Express	Ackertac	Ohio Gold
2012
Hunt Ball	White Star Line	Owen Glendower
2011
Divers	Quantitativeeasing	Tullamore Dew

2010-2005
2010
Copper Bleu	Othermix	The Midnight Club
2009
Chapoturgeon	Isn't That Lucky	Crescent Island
2008
Finger Onthe Pulse	Barbers Shop	Possol
2007
L'Antartique	Bob Hall	Wee Robbie
2006
Reveillez	Copsale Lad	Tumbling Dice
2005
King Harald	Lacdoudal	See You Sometime

The Centenary Novices' Handicap Chase, known for sponsorship purposes as the Paddy's Reward Club Novices' Handicap Chase, is a Listed National Hunt steeplechase in Great Britain which is open to horses aged five years or older. It is run at Sandown Park over a distance of about 2 miles and 4 furlongs (2 miles 4 furlongs and 10 yards, or 4,033 metres), and during its running there are sixteen fences to be jumped. It is a handicap race for novice chasers with a handicap rating between 0 and 145, and it takes place each year in March.

The event was originally run at Cheltenham Racecourse and was established when a fourth day was added to the Cheltenham Festival in 2005. The winning ride by Mattie Batchelor in the inaugural edition subsequently won the Lester Award for Jump Ride of the Year. The race was sponsored by Jewson from 2005 to 2010 and run as the Jewson Novices' Handicap Chase on the third day of the Festival. Jewson transferred their sponsorship to a new race at the 2011 Festival, the Jewson Novices' Chase, which remained on the third day while the Novices' Handicap Chase was moved to become the final race on the opening day of the Festival. The race title commemorated the centenary of the Cheltenham Festival in 2011. In 2012 the race was sponsored by Pulteney Land Investments and from 2013 to 2014 by Rewards4Racing. In 2015 it was sponsored by Chaps Restaurants Barbados and from 2016 to 2019 the race was sponsored by Close Brothers Group. The race's sponsors in 2020 were Northern Trust and since 2021 it has been sponsored by Paddy Power.

The Centenary Novices' Chase was removed from the Festival programme in 2021 to make way for a new steeplechase for mares, the Liberthine Mares' Chase and was transferred to the meeting which takes place at Sandown Park a few days before the Cheltenham Festival. The race held Listed status until 2022 and was re-classified as a Premier Handicap from the 2023 running when Listed status was removed from handicap races.

== Records ==
Leading jockey (3 wins):

- Brendan Powell Jnr - Present View (2014), Killer Kane (2022), Scarface (2024)

Leading trainer (2 wins):

- Ferdy Murphy - L'Antartique (2007), Divers (2011)

== Winners ==
- Weights given in stones and pounds.

Year	Winner	Age	Weight	Jockey	Trainer
2005	King Harald	7	10-04	Mattie Batchelor	Mark Bradstock
2006	Reveillez	7	10-11	Tony McCoy	James Fanshawe
2007	L'Antartique	7	10-11	Graham Lee	Ferdy Murphy
2008	Finger On the Pulse	7	10-12	Barry Geraghty	Tom Taaffe
2009	Chapoturgeon	5	10-11	Timmy Murphy	Paul Nicholls
2010	Copper Bleu	8	11-01	Richard Johnson	Philip Hobbs
2011	Divers	7	11-04	Graham Lee	Ferdy Murphy
2012	Hunt Ball	7	12-00	Nick Scholfield	Keiran Burke
2013	Rajdhani Express	6	11-12	Sam Waley-Cohen (Note: amateur jockey)	Nicky Henderson
2014	Present View	6	11-07	Brendan Powell Jnr	Jamie Snowden
2015	Irish Cavalier	6	11-07	Paul Townend	Rebecca Curtis
2016	Ballyalton	9	11-10	Brian Hughes	Ian Williams
2017	Tully East	7	11-08	Denis O'Regan	Alan Fleming
2018	Mister Whitaker	6	11-02	Brian Hughes	Mick Channon
2019	A Plus Tard	5	11-07	Rachael Blackmore	Henry de Bromhead
2020	Imperial Aura	7	11-05	David Bass	Kim Bailey
2021	Farinet	6	10-05	Charlie Deutsch	Venetia Williams
2022	Killer Kane	7	11-01	Brendan Powell Jnr	Colin Tizzard
2023	Hudson De Grugy	6	10-05	Jamie Moore	Gary Moore
2024	Scarface	7	10-13	Brendan Powell Jnr	Joe Tizzard

== See also ==
- Horse racing in Great Britain
- List of British National Hunt races
