= David Nicholson Mares' Hurdle =

Hurdle horse race in Britain

David Nicholson Mares' Hurdle (Close Brothers Mares' Hurdle)
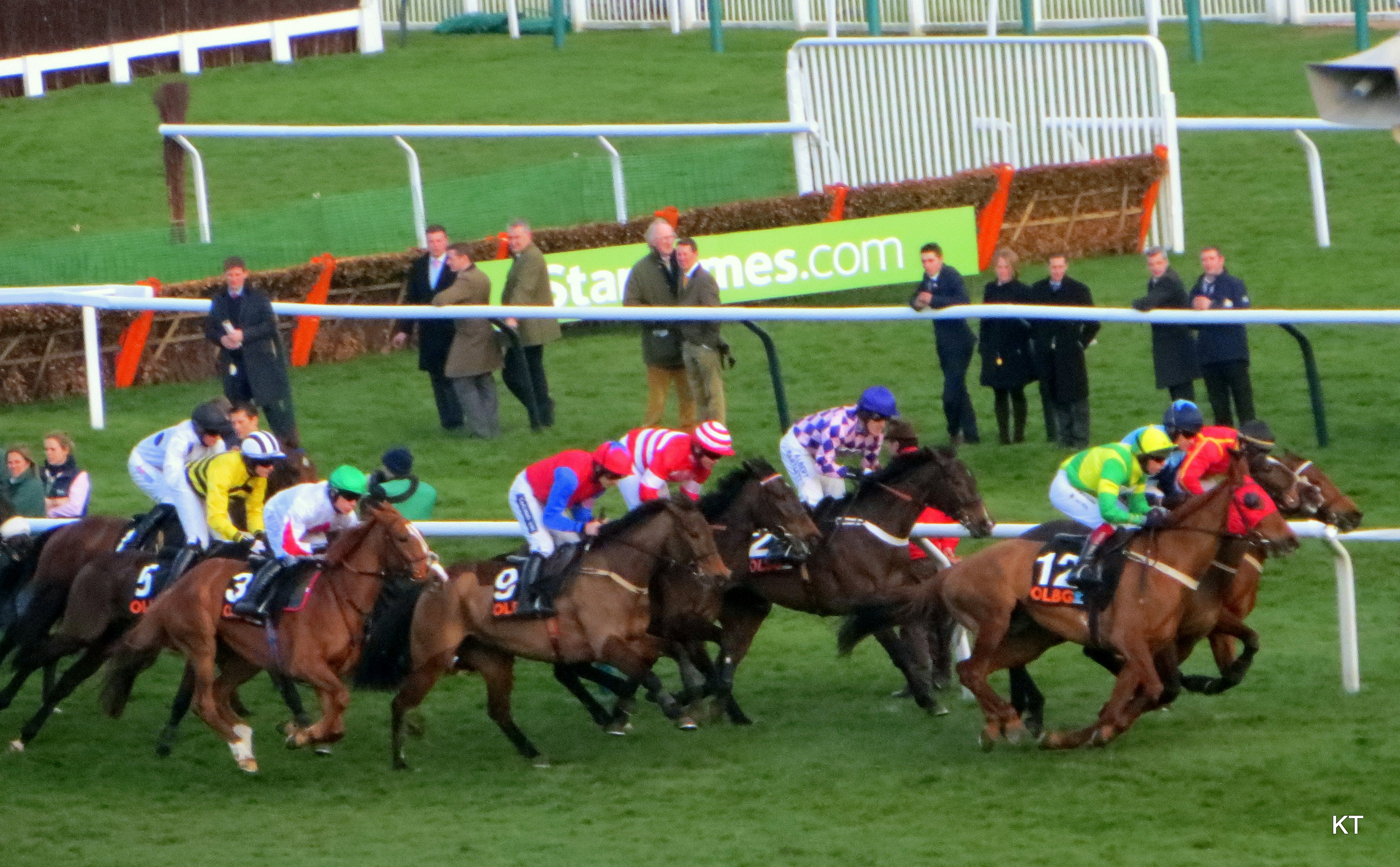
- The 2014 running, won by Quevega
- Class: Grade 1
- Location: Cheltenham Racecourse; Cheltenham, England
- Inaugurated: 2008
- Race type: Hurdle race
- Sponsor: Close Brothers Group
- Website: Cheltenham

Race information
- Distance: 2m 3f 200y (4,005 metres)
- Surface: Turf
- Track: Left-handed
- Qualification: Four-years-old and up fillies & mares
- Weight: 10 st 7 lb (4yo); 11 st 5 lb (5yo+)
- Purse: £124,200 (2025); 1st: £69,887

OLBG Mares' Hurdle
2026
Wodhooh	Jade De Grugy	Feet Of A Dancer

Previous years
2025
Lossiemouth	Jade De Grugy	Take No Chances
2024
Lossiemouth	Telmesomethinggirl	Hispanic Moon
2023
Honeysuckle	Love Envoi	Queens Brook
2022
Marie's Rock	Queens Brook	Mrs Milner
2021
Black Tears	Concertista	Roksana

2020-2011
2020
Honeysuckle	Benie Des Dieux	Elfile
2019
Roksana	Stormy Ireland	Good Thyne Tara
2018
Benie Des Dieux	Midnight Tour	Apple's Jade
2017
Apple's Jade	Vroum Vroum Mag	Limini
2016
Vroum Vroum Mag	Rock on the Moor	Legacy Gold
2015
Glens Melody	Polly Peachum	Bitofapuzzle
2014
Quevega	Glens Melody	L'unique
2013
Quevega	Sirene D'ainay	Swincombe Flame
2012
Quevega	Kentford Grey Lady	Golden Sunbird
2011
Quevega	Sparky May	Ocean Transit

2010-2008
2010
Quevega	Carole's Legacy	Voler La Vedette
2009
Quevega	United	Aura About You
2008
Whiteoak	Refinement	Chomba Womba

The David Nicholson Mares' Hurdle, currently known for sponsorship purposes as the Close Brothers Mares' Hurdle, is a Grade 1 National Hunt hurdle race in Great Britain which is open to mares aged four years or older. It is run on the Old Course at Cheltenham over a distance of about 2 miles and 4 furlongs (2 miles, 3 furlongs and 200 yards, or 4,005 metres), and during its running there are ten hurdles to be jumped. The race is scheduled to take place each year during the Cheltenham Festival in March.

The race's registered title commemorates David Nicholson (1939–2006), who was successful as both a jockey and a trainer in National Hunt racing. Nicholson's record at the Cheltenham Festival included five victories as a jockey, and seventeen as a trainer.

This race was established in 2008, and in its inaugural year it was held on the final day of the Festival on Cheltenham's New Course. It was switched to the opening day on the Old Course in 2009. It was initially given Grade 2 status and was upgraded to Grade 1 status from the 2015 running. From 2012 to 2019 it was run as the OLBG Mares' Hurdle.

== Records ==
Most successful horse (6 wins):

- Quevega – 2009, 2010, 2011, 2012, 2013, 2014

Leading jockey (8 wins):

- Ruby Walsh – Quevega (2009, 2010, 2011, 2012, 2013, 2014), Vroum Vroum Mag (2016), Benie Des Dieux (2018)

Leading trainer (11 wins):

- Willie Mullins – Quevega (2009, 2010, 2011, 2012, 2013, 2014), Glens Melody (2015), Vroum Vroum Mag (2016), Benie Des Dieux (2018), Lossiemouth (2024, 2025)

== Winners ==
Year	Winner	Age	Jockey	Trainer
2008	Whiteoak	5	Jason Maguire	Donald McCain Jr.
2009	Quevega	5	Ruby Walsh	Willie Mullins
2010	Quevega	6	Ruby Walsh	Willie Mullins
2011	Quevega	7	Ruby Walsh	Willie Mullins
2012	Quevega	8	Ruby Walsh	Willie Mullins
2013	Quevega	9	Ruby Walsh	Willie Mullins
2014	Quevega	10	Ruby Walsh	Willie Mullins
2015	Glens Melody	7	Paul Townend	Willie Mullins
2016	Vroum Vroum Mag	7	Ruby Walsh	Willie Mullins
2017	Apple's Jade	5	Bryan Cooper	Gordon Elliott
2018	Benie Des Dieux	7	Ruby Walsh	Willie Mullins
2019	Roksana	7	Harry Skelton	Dan Skelton
2020	Honeysuckle	6	Rachael Blackmore	Henry de Bromhead
2021	Black Tears	7	Jack Kennedy	Denise Foster
2022	Marie's Rock	7	Nico de Boinville	Nicky Henderson
2023	Honeysuckle	9	Rachael Blackmore	Henry de Bromhead
2024	Lossiemouth	5	Paul Townend	Willie Mullins
2025	Lossiemouth	6	Paul Townend	Willie Mullins
2026	Wodhooh	6	Jack Kennedy	Gordon Elliott

== See also ==
- Horse racing in Great Britain
- List of British National Hunt races
- David Nicholson (horse racing)
