= Brave Inca =

Irish Thoroughbred racehorse (1998–2025)

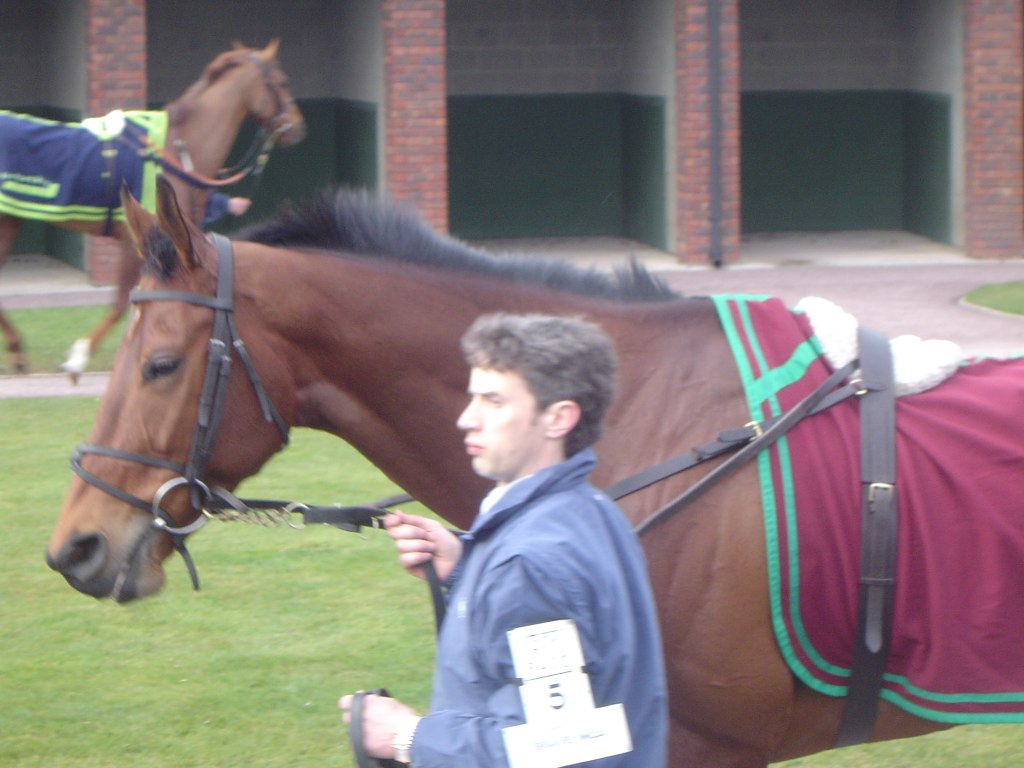
- Brave Inca at the Cheltenham Festival in 2005
- Sire: Good Thyne
- Dam: Wigwam Mam
- Damsire: Commanche Run
- Sex: Gelding
- Foaled: 1998
- Country: Ireland
- Colour: Bay
- Breeder: D W McAuley
- Owner: Novices Syndicate
- Trainer: Colm Murphy
- Record: 35: 15-8-4
- Earnings: £971,332

Major wins
- Champion Hurdle (2006); Supreme Novices' Hurdle (2004); Irish Champion Hurdle (2006, 2009); December Festival Hurdle (2005, 2006); Punchestown Champion Hurdle (2005); Deloitte Novice Hurdle (2004); Evening Herald Champion Novice Hurdle (2004); Hatton's Grace Hurdle (2006)

Awards
- Anglo-Irish Jump Horse of the Year (2006)
- Last updated on 18 September 2025

Brave Inca (20 April 1998 – 18 September 2025) was an Irish-bred and Irish-trained Thoroughbred racehorse. In a career that lasted from March 2002 until April 2009, he ran thirty-five times and won 15 races, ten of them at Grade I level. including the 2006 Champion Hurdle. From 2005 until he was retired, Brava Inca ran in sixteen successive Grade I races.

== Background ==
Brave Inca was bred in Ireland by D.W. McAuley. His sire was Good Thyne, an American-bred stallion who produced the winners of over 600 jumps races in Britain and Ireland. He was the first foal of his dam, the unraced Wigwam Mam. He was sold as a foal for 1,600gns at Tattersalls and as a yearling for IR£6,000, eventually becoming the property of the Novices Syndicate. He was trained throughout his career by Colm Murphy in the village of Killenagh, near Gorey, County Wexford.

== Early career (2001–2004) ==
Brave Inca began his career by running unplaced in minor hurdle races at Navan and Wexford in March of the 2001/2002 season. The following season began similarly with down-the-field efforts in minor hurdle events at Fairyhouse and Naas. In these two races, he was ridden by Barry Cash, who became his regular jockey for the next three seasons. In March 2003, he was switched to National Hunt flat races and began to show improvement, winning "bumpers" at Fairyhouse and Navan by wide margins.

Because of his early failures, Brave Inca entered the 2003/2004 season as a novice hurdler. He then went unbeaten in five starts. After picking up two handicaps before Christmas, he won his first major prize by defeating Newmill in the Grade I Deloitte Novice Hurdle. At Cheltenham, he was sent off 7-2 favourite for the Supreme Novices' Hurdle and won by a neck over future Cheltenham Gold Cup winner War of Attrition. The win provoked "near-hysterical" celebrations among the large Irish contingent, with Colm Murphy being carried shoulder-high into the winner's enclosure. In his final start of the season in the Evening Herald Champion Novice Hurdle at Punchestown, Brave Inca defeated the English-trained Top Novices' Hurdle winner Royal Shakespeare by a short head.

== Rise to the Championship (2004–2006) ==
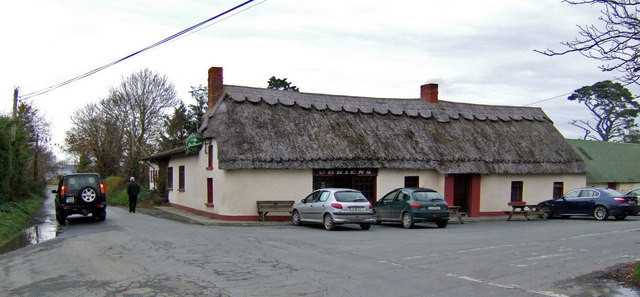
O'Brien's thatched pub at Killenagh, a gathering point for Brave Inca's supporters

In the 2004/5 season, Brave Inca won once from seven starts. On his debut at Dromore in November, he narrowly failed to give 10 lbs to Macs Joy^{1} , a horse he met many times over the subsequent seasons. Later in the same month, he ran second to the mare Solerina in the two-and-a-half-mile Hatton's Grace Hurdle. Two more second places followed in the December Festival Hurdle and the Irish Champion Hurdle with Macs Joy victorious on both occasions.

Brave Inca was sent off as a 10-1 chance for his first attempt at the Champion Hurdle in March 2005. In an eventful race, he finished third, beaten two necks by Hardy Eustace, who won his second championship, and Harchibald, who had seemed certain to win after the final hurdle. As a result of this effort, Brave Inca was sent off 2-1 favourite for the Aintree Hurdle but fell for the first and only time in his career. A season of near-misses ended as he rallied after being headed close home to defeat Harchibald and Macs Joy in the Punchestown Champion Hurdle, in which he was ridden for the first time by Tony McCoy.

Although he was already seven years old at the start of the 2005/6 season, Brave Inca appeared to be reaching his peak, an impression that was confirmed when McCoy rode him to victory in the Morgiana Hurdle, beating Harchibald and Macs Joy again. After another failed attempt at the Hatton's Grace Hurdle, he confirmed his superiority over the best two-mile hurdlers in Ireland with an "easy" and "convincing" victory in the December Festival Hurdle after which he was quoted as 5-1 joint favourite for the Championship. A triumph in the Irish Champion Hurdle meant that he was seen as the potential champion by the time of the 2006 Cheltenham Festival Sent off 7-4 favourite in a field of 18, Brave Inca landed the odds in the Champion Hurdle, winning by a length from Macs Joy, with Hardy Eustace three lengths back in third. "He's all there", said Murphy after the race. "He's a complete horse now." On his final start of the season, Brave Inca finished second to Macs Joy in the Punchestown Champion Hurdle.

== Later career ==
In 2006/7, Brave Inca won the Hatton's Grace Hurdle at his third attempt and a second December Festival Hurdle, as well as finishing runner-up in the Irish Champion Hurdle. In the Champion Hurdle, he defeated most of the leading contenders, including Detroit City and Hardy Eustace, but finished second, three lengths behind the surprise 16-1 winner Sublimity.

Brave Inca missed the whole of the 2007/8 season with a tendon injury but returned in 2008/9. Although now well past his best, he managed one last major victory by winning the Irish Champion Hurdle at the age of 11, after which Colm Murphy described him as "unbelievable, one in a million. He's as tough as nails".

== Retirement ==
Brave Inca was retired from racing after running down the field in the 2009 Champion Hurdle. He had not retired from competition, becoming a successful show-horse. He had also been used to raise funds for the "Playing for Life" charity by taking part in a "Man vs Horse" race at Leopardstown in December 2010.

Brave Inca died on 18 September 2025 after contracting colic. Murphy commented "He was an absolute gentleman... he was a joy of a horse in every sense. He had it all and he spoke for himself. He had plenty of class, but behind it all he was lazy. He would always come off the bridle and make it look like hard work but he was a very intelligent horse".

== Pedigree ==
Pedigree of Brave Inca (IRE), bay gelding, 1998
Sire Good Thyne (USA) 1977	Herbager; 1956	Vandale	Plassy
Sire Good Thyne (USA) 1977	Herbager; 1956	Vandale	Vanille
Sire Good Thyne (USA) 1977	Herbager; 1956	Flagette	Escamillo
Sire Good Thyne (USA) 1977	Herbager; 1956	Flagette	Fidgette
Sire Good Thyne (USA) 1977	Foreseer; 1969	Round Table	Princequillo
Sire Good Thyne (USA) 1977	Foreseer; 1969	Round Table	Knights Daughter
Sire Good Thyne (USA) 1977	Foreseer; 1969	Regal Gleam	Hail To Reason
Sire Good Thyne (USA) 1977	Foreseer; 1969	Regal Gleam	Miz Carol
Dam Wigwam Mam (IRE) 1993	Commanche Run; 1981	Run The Gantlet	Tom Rolfe
Dam Wigwam Mam (IRE) 1993	Commanche Run; 1981	Run The Gantlet	First Feather
Dam Wigwam Mam (IRE) 1993	Commanche Run; 1981	Volley	Ratification
Dam Wigwam Mam (IRE) 1993	Commanche Run; 1981	Volley	Mitrailleuse
Dam Wigwam Mam (IRE) 1993	Rozifer; 1978	Lucifer	Crimson Satan
Dam Wigwam Mam (IRE) 1993	Rozifer; 1978	Lucifer	La Joliette
Dam Wigwam Mam (IRE) 1993	Rozifer; 1978	Rozeen	Merry Rose
Dam Wigwam Mam (IRE) 1993	Rozifer; 1978	Rozeen	Pandomas (Family: 8-c)

== Notes ==
^{1} Macs Joy: This is the correct spelling. There is no apostrophe.
