= Hurricane Fly =

Irish-bred Thoroughbred racehorse (2004–2026)

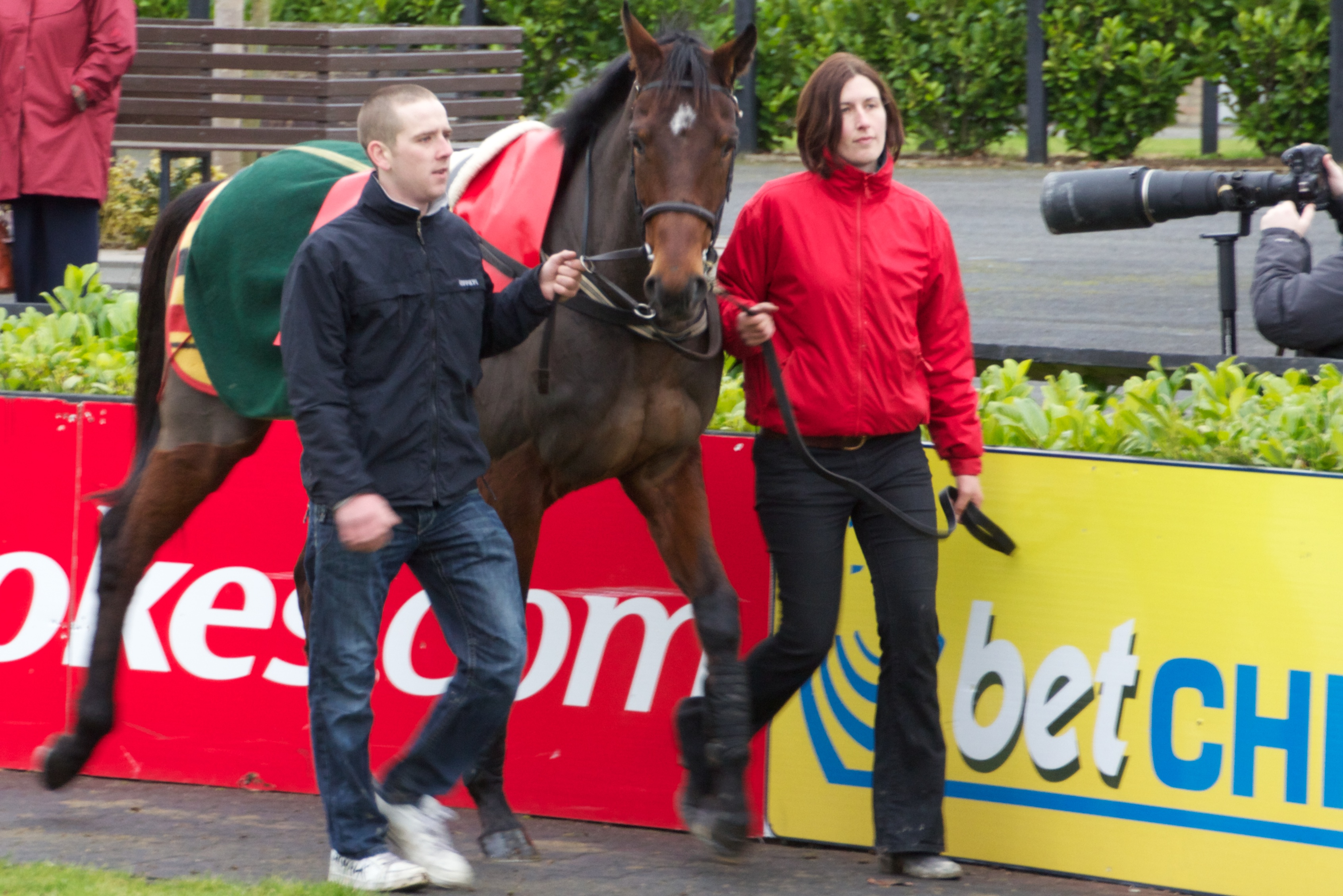
- Hurricane Fly in 2012
- Sire: Montjeu
- Grandsire: Sadler's Wells
- Dam: Scandisk
- Damsire: Kenmare
- Sex: Gelding
- Foaled: 5 April 2004
- Died: September 2026 (aged 22)
- Country: Ireland
- Colour: Bay
- Breeder: Agricola Del Parco
- Owner: Raoul Teman; Hans-Peter Breitenstein; George Creighton & Rose Boyd
- Trainer: J-L Pelletan; Willie Mullins
- Record: 42: 26-5-4; 10: 2-2-1 flat 32: 24-3-3 hurdles
- Earnings: £1,894,422

Major wins
- Prix de Longchamp Hurdle (2008); Royal Bond Novice Hurdle (2008); Future Champions Novice Hurdle (2008); Evening Herald Champion Novice Hurdle (2009); Punchestown Champion Hurdle (2010, 2011, 2012, 2013); Hatton's Grace Hurdle (2010); December Festival Hurdle (2010, 2012, 2013, 2014); Irish Champion Hurdle (2011, 2012, 2013, 2014, 2015); Champion Hurdle (2011, 2013); Morgiana Hurdle (2012, 2013, 2014); Timeform rating: 171 (Hurdle), 108 (Flat) (Note: The Irish Times reported Hurricane Fly's top Timeform rating as 175 in 2015.)
- Last updated on 22 September 2026

Hurricane Fly (5 April 2004 – 22 September 2026) was an Irish Thoroughbred racehorse best known for his performances in hurdle races when under the care of trainer Willie Mullins at Closutton in County Carlow in Ireland. He was a dual winner of the Champion Hurdle and previously held the world record for most Grade 1 (or Group 1) races won by any racehorse until overtaken by Winx in 2019. Originally bred to be a flat racer, the gelding began his racing career in France where he had moderate success, winning twice in ten races. At the end of 2007 he was sold and transferred to Ireland where he began to compete in National Hunt events. On 15 March 2011, Hurricane Fly ridden by Ruby Walsh won the Champion Hurdle at Cheltenham.

After finishing third in the 2012 renewal, he became the first horse in thirty-eight years to regain the Champion Hurdle title by winning the race for a second time in 2013. On 26 April 2013, he had his 16th Grade 1 victory in the Punchestown Champion Hurdle equalling the record for Grade 1 wins previously shared by Kauto Star and John Henry. He took sole possession of the record when winning the Morgiana Hurdle on 17 November 2013. He added a further five wins at the highest level before being retired with a record total of 22 such wins in August 2015. That total was equalled by Winx when she won the W. S. Cox Plate on 27 October 2018. Hurricane Fly retired to the Irish National Stud in County Kildare and enjoyed meeting admirers who visited him. He died on 22 September 2026.

== Background ==
Hurricane Fly was a small bay horse with a white star bred in Ireland by the Italian Agricola Del Parco. He was one of many top-class horses sired by Montjeu. Others include the Derby winners Pour Moi, Authorized, Camelot and Motivator, the St Leger winners Scorpion and Masked Marvel and the Prix de l'Arc de Triomphe winner Hurricane Run. He was originally sent into training with Jean-Louis Pelletan in France.

== Racing career ==
=== 2006 & 2007 seasons: Flat racing ===
As a two-year-old in France in 2006, Hurricane Fly ran four times in flat races, failing to win but placing in three of them. In the following year he won two races including the listed Prix Omnium II (beating the subsequent Champion Stakes winner Literato) but finished well beaten when moved up to Group class in races such as the Prix Daphnis, Prix de Guiche, and Prix Eugène Adam. In late 2007 the horse was sold to George Creighton and was transferred to the stable of Willie Mullins at Bagenalstown, County Carlow in Ireland to be trained for a National Hunt career.

=== 2008/2009 season: Novice hurdles ===
In his first season as a jumper, Hurricane Fly competed in Novice Hurdle races, restricted to horses who had not won a hurdle race before the start of the season. He won a race at Punchestown Racecourse in May and then returned to France to win the Grade Three Gras Savoye Prix de Longchamp Hurdle at Auteuil. Racing over the same course and distance in June he finished second to Grivette in the Grade One Prix Alain de Breil, finishing just ahead of his stable companion Quevega. Returning to Ireland later in the year he recorded his first Grade One win when beating Donnas Palm by a neck in the Royal Bond Novice Hurdle at Fairyhouse Racecourse in November and followed up by winning the Future Champions Novice Hurdle at Leopardstown Racecourse a month later, beating Go Native by ten lengths. In the following spring he bypassed the Cheltenham Festival in March, but ran at Punchestown Festival in April, where he won the Evening Herald Champion Novice Hurdle by seven lengths.

=== 2009/2010 season: Senior hurdles ===
On his first appearance as a senior hurdler, Hurricane Fly started the 8/13 favourite for the Punchestown Hurdle, but finished third of the four runners behind Solwhit. On his only other appearance of the season returned to Punchestown in April and defeated Solwhit by a neck in the Punchestown Champion Hurdle: the other beaten horses included Thousand Stars, Dunguib, Voler la Vedette and Punjabi.

=== 2010/2011 season ===
Hurricane Fly was undefeated in five starts in the 2010/2011 National Hunt season. In December he defeated Solwhit in two Group One races: the Hatton's Grace Hurdle at Fairyhouse and the December Festival Hurdle at Leopardstown. In January he won the Irish Champion Hurdle and was then sent to the Cheltenham Festival for the first time to contest the Champion Hurdle. Racing for the first time in England, he started the 11/4 favourite in a field of eleven runners and was ridden by Ruby Walsh. He took the lead at the last flight of hurdles and won by one and a quarter lengths from Peddlers Cross. After the race Walsh described the winner as a "deserved champion" and "a great horse". Hurricane Fly ended his season by beating Thousand Stars by five lengths in the Punchestown Champion Hurdle on 6 May.

=== 2011/2012 season ===
After a break of more than eight months, Hurricane Fly returned to the racecourse in January 2012 to contest the Irish Champion Hurdle. He started favourite at odds of 4/5 and won by six and a half lengths from Oscar's Well. In March he returned to Cheltenham to defend the Champion Hurdle and was made 4/6 favourite in a field of ten runners. He was held up in the early stages and made steady progress in the last half mile, but was unable to reach the leaders and finished third behind Rock On Ruby and Overturn. On his only other start of the season he won the Punchestown Champion Hurdle for the third time, beating Zaidpour by two and a half lengths.

=== 2012/2013 season ===
Hurricane Fly began the 2012/2013 season by winning the Morgiana Hurdle in November by twelve lengths from Captain Cee Bee. On 29 December, the gelding won his thirteenth Grade One race when he won the December Festival Hurdle by seven lengths. Hurricane Fly won his third consecutive Irish Champion Hurdle on 27 January, beating Thousand Stars by five lengths with Binocular in third place. After the race, Mullins expressed the view that the gelding had returned to his best form.

On 12 March 2013 at Cheltenham, Hurricane Fly attempted to become the first horse since Comedy of Errors in 1975 to regain the Cheltenham Champion Hurdle. Ridden by Ruby Walsh, he was backed from 9/4 in the morning into an SP of 13/8 favourite against eight opponents, including 2012 champion Rock On Ruby and 2010 champion Binocular. After going through a flat spot and appearing to struggle early in the race, Hurricane Fly tracked the front-running Rock On Ruby before coming back on the bridle coming around the home bend and taking the lead after the second-last hurdle. He won by two and a half lengths from the 2012 champion, Rock On Ruby, with Countrywide Flame in third.

On 26 April, Hurricane Fly ended his season by winning his 16th grade one race, equalling legendary chaser Kauto Star and American flat champion John Henry. This was also Hurricane Fly's fourth consecutive Punchestown Champion Hurdle. He beat Thousand Stars by seven lengths with Rock On Ruby in third.

=== 2013/2014 season ===
Hurricane Fly began his next season in the Morgiana Hurdle at Punchestown on 17 November. Starting the 1/16 favourite he created a new world record by winning his 17th Grade I success, beating Marito by one and a quarter lengths. Both Mullins and Walsh stated that the gelding would improve significantly for the race. On 29 December, in the Ryanair Hurdle at Leopardstown, Hurricane Fly took on two of the best young hurdlers in Ireland: Our Conor the winner of the 2013 Triumph Hurdle and Jezki, the winner of the 2013 Hatton's Grace Hurdle. Hurricane Fly took the lead approaching the final hurdle and won by two and a half lengths from Jezki, with Our Conor three and a quarter lengths back in third place.

On 26 January, 2014, Hurricane Fly attempted to win the Irish Champion Hurdle for fourth time. Starting the 4/7 favourite, he took the lead approaching the last hurdle and fought back after being headed to win by one and a half lengths from Our Conor with Captain Cee Bee third and Jezki the last of four. Hurricane Fly started 11/4 favourite to win his third Champion Hurdle at Cheltenham on 11 March. He briefly disputed the lead after the second last, but eventually finished fourth behind Jezki, My Tent Or Yours and The New One. Hurricane Fly finished his season by finishing second to his Champion Hurdle conqueror Jezki in the Punchestown Champion hurdle in May, going down by 3 1/4 lengths.

=== 2014/2015 season ===
Hurricane Fly made his 2014/15 seasonal reappearance, as usual, in the Grade 1 Morgiana Hurdle at Punchestown on 16 November. Once again Hurricane Fly faced soft going and the reigning Champion Hurdler, Jezki. Ruby Walsh was on board once more in a race that despite attracting a field of 5, was very much a match race between Hurricane Fly and Jezki. With most punters expecting Jessica Harrington's horse to uphold the form from the spring, Jezki was the well backed 8/13 favourite to defeat Hurricane Fly for the third time in succession. Third-choice Little King Robin set the pace and was well clear of the pack early on with Jezki in second and Hurricane Fly in third. The order stayed this way until after the second last when Jezki, ridden for the first time by Mark Walsh, took up the running with Hurricane Fly his shadow. Jezki made a slight mistake jumping the final hurdle and Hurricane Fly, who was travelling much better than the favourite, pounced upon the leader and under a powerful ride from Walsh sprinted past the younger horse to win by 2 1/4 lengths. Hurricane Fly again faced Jezki in the Ryanair Hurdle at Leopardstown on 29 December, with the Triumph Hurdle winner Tiger Roll also in opposition. After racing fifth of the seven runners in the early stages he moved up to challenge for the lead approaching the last and took the lead on the run-in to beat Jezki by half a length. On 25 January, the gelding was again opposed by Jezki as he attempted to win his fifth Irish Champion Hurdle and his twenty-second Grade I race. Starting the 11/10 favourite he took a narrow lead approaching the last and drew away in the closing stages to win by three and a half lengths from Arctic Fire, with Jezki in third.

On 10 March 2015, Hurricane Fly attempted to win his third Champion Hurdle in five years and started the 8/1 fourth choice in the betting behind Faugheen, The New One and Jezki. He was in touch with the leaders for most of the race and made a forward move approaching the final hurdle but was outpaced on the run-in and finished third behind Faugheen and Arctic Fire, beaten six and a half lengths by the winner. The gelding was then stepped up in distance for the World Series Hurdle at Punchestown in which he was beaten into second by Jezki. In June he returned to France for the first time in seven years to contest the Grande Course de Haies d'Auteuil over 5100 metres and was made favourite against fourteen opponents on very soft ground. He stayed on in the closing stages without ever looking likely to win and finished sixth behind Un Temps Pour Tout. His retirement from racing was announced on 31 August 2015 with Mullins calling him "the horse of a generation".

== Death ==
Hurricane Fly's death at the age of 22 was announced on 22 September 2026.

== Pedigree ==
Pedigree of Hurricane Fly (IRE), bay gelding, 2004
| Sire Montjeu (IRE) 1996 | Sadler's Wells; 1981 | Northern Dancer | Nearctic |
| Sire Montjeu (IRE) 1996 | Sadler's Wells; 1981 | Northern Dancer | Natalma |
| Sire Montjeu (IRE) 1996 | Sadler's Wells; 1981 | Fairy Bridge | Bold Reason |
| Sire Montjeu (IRE) 1996 | Sadler's Wells; 1981 | Fairy Bridge | Special |
| Sire Montjeu (IRE) 1996 | Floripedes; 1985 | Top Ville | High Top |
| Sire Montjeu (IRE) 1996 | Floripedes; 1985 | Top Ville | Sega Ville |
| Sire Montjeu (IRE) 1996 | Floripedes; 1985 | Toute Cy | Tennyson |
| Sire Montjeu (IRE) 1996 | Floripedes; 1985 | Toute Cy | Adele Toumignon |
| Dam Scandisk (IRE) 1995 | Kenmare; 1975 | Kalamoun | Zeddaan |
| Dam Scandisk (IRE) 1995 | Kenmare; 1975 | Kalamoun | Khairunissa |
| Dam Scandisk (IRE) 1995 | Kenmare; 1975 | Belle of Ireland | Milesian |
| Dam Scandisk (IRE) 1995 | Kenmare; 1975 | Belle of Ireland | Belle of the Ball |
| Dam Scandisk (IRE) 1995 | Yankee Lady; 1977 | Lord Gayle | Sir Gaylord |
| Dam Scandisk (IRE) 1995 | Yankee Lady; 1977 | Lord Gayle | Sticky Case |
| Dam Scandisk (IRE) 1995 | Yankee Lady; 1977 | Ceol an Oir | Vimy |
| Dam Scandisk (IRE) 1995 | Yankee Lady; 1977 | Ceol an Oir | Pal an Oir (Family 1-p) |

== See also ==
- List of leading Thoroughbred racehorses
- List of racehorses
- Repeat winners of horse races
