= Irish Champion Hurdle =

Hurdle horse race in Ireland

Irish Champion Hurdle
2026
Brighterdaysahead	Lossiemouth	Poniros

Previous years
2025
State Man	Daddy Long Legs	Winter Fog
2024
State Man	Bob Olinger	Impaire Et Passe
2023
State Man	Honeysuckle	Vauban
2022
Honeysuckle	Zanahiyr	Echoes In Rain
2021
Honeysuckle	Abacadabras	Sharjah

2020-2011
2020
Honeysuckle	Darver Star	Petit Mouchoir
2019
Apple's Jade	Supasundae	Petit Mouchoir
2018
Supasundae	Faugheen	Mick Jazz
2017
Petit Mouchoir	Footpad	Ivanovich Gorbatov
2016
Faugheen	Arctic Fire	Nichols Canyon
2015
Hurricane Fly	Arctic Fire	Jezki
2014
Hurricane Fly	Our Conor	Captain Cee Bee
2013
Hurricane Fly	Thousand Stars	Binocular
2012
Hurricane Fly	Oscars Well	Thousand Stars
2011
Hurricane Fly	Solwhit	Thousand Stars

2010-2001
2010
Solwhit	Donnas Palm	Sublimity
2009
Brave Inca	Muirhead	River Liane
2008
Sizing Europe	Hardy Eustace	Al Eile
2007
Hardy Eustace	Brave Inca	Macs Joy
2006
Brave Inca	Macs Joy	Golden Cross
2005
Macs Joy	Brave Inca	Hardy Eustace
2004
Foreman	Georges Girl	Fota Island
2003
Like-A-Butterfly	Limestone Lad	Stage Affair
2002
Ned Kelly	Liss A Paoraigh	The French Furze
2001
Istabraq	Mantles Prince	Penny Rich

2000-1994
2000
Istabraq	Stage Affair	Knife Edge
1999
Istabraq	French Holly	Zafarabad
1998
Istabraq	His Song	Noble Thyne
1997
Cockney Lad	Theatreworld	Dardjini
1996
Collier Bay	Hotel Minella	Danoli
1995
Fortune And Fame	Aries Girl	Clifdon Fog
1994
Fortune And Fame	Danoli	Shawiya

The Irish Champion Hurdle is a Grade 1 National Hunt hurdle race in Ireland which is open to horses aged four years or older. It is run at Leopardstown over a distance of about 2 miles (3,219 metres), and during its running there are eight hurdles to be jumped. The race is scheduled to take place each year in late January or early February.

The event was established in 1950, and it is now one of two Irish races, along with the Punchestown Champion Hurdle, which can be seen as equivalents of the Champion Hurdle in England. The most recent winner of the Leopardstown version to win the Champion Hurdle in the same season was State Man in 2024. The Irish Champion Hurdle was sponsored by AIG Europe from 1993 to 2008, by Toshiba in 2009 and 2010 and by BHP Insurance from 2011 to 2019. The race has been sponsored by PCI since 2020 and is now part of the Dublin Racing Festival weekend.

== Records ==
Most successful horse (5 wins):

- Hurricane Fly – 2011, 2012, 2013, 2014, 2015

Most successful jockey (6 wins):

- Charlie Swan – Nordic Surprise (1991), Istabraq (1998, 1999, 2000, 2001), Like-A-Butterfly (2003)
- Ruby Walsh – Brave Inca (2009), Hurricane Fly (2012, 2013, 2014, 2015), Faugheen (2016)

Most successful trainer (9 wins):

- Willie Mullins – Hurricane Fly (2011, 2012, 2013, 2014, 2015), Faugheen (2016), State Man (2023, 2024, 2025)

== Winners ==
Year	Winner	Age	Jockey	Trainer
1950	Hatton's Grace	10	R. J. O'Ryan	Vincent O'Brien
1951	Penny on the Jack	5	B. Cooper	D. St. J. Gough
1952	Domaghmore		T. P. Burns	Paddy Sleator
1953	Limeona	5	J. J. Rafferty	D. Kirwan
1954	La Laun	6	M. R. Magee	J. T. Doyle
	no race 1955
1956	Triomphe		Eddie Harty	J. Mangan
1957	Caesar's Helm	6	C. Finnegan	A. C. Bryce-Smith
1958	Albany Star		W. J. Brennan	G. Robinson
1959	Floor Show	9	Bobby Beasley	Paddy Sleator
1960	Albergo	6	S. Page	Clem Magnier
1961	Albergo	7	Doug Page	Clem Magnier
1962	Rainlough		Toss Taaffe	Tom Taaffe
1963	Winning Fair	8	Alan Lillingston (Note: amateur jockey)	George Spencer
1964	Flyingbolt	5	Pat Taaffe	Tom Dreaper
1965	Havago	6	C. Finnegan	Paddy Sleator
1966	Gypsando	7	C. Finnegan	Captain C. B. Harty
1967	Mr Twomey		John Kiely	J. Cullen
1968	Muir	9	Ben Hannon	Tom Dreaper
1969	L'Escargot	6	Tommy Carberry	Dan Moore
	no race 1970
1971	Lockyersleigh	8	Tommy Carberry	Paddy Mullins
1972	Super Day		John Fowler	G. St. John Nolan
1973	Captain Christy	6	Bobby Beasley	Pat Taaffe
1974	Flashy Boy		Tommy Carberry	A. Watson
1975	Ribosaint	6	Frank Berry	Phonsie O'Brien
1976	Prominent King	4	Frank Berry	Kevin Prendergast
1977	Master Monday	7	John Harty	L. Quirke
1978	Prominent King	6	Bobby Coonan	Kevin Prendergast
1979	Connaught Ranger	5	Colin Tinkler	Fred Rimell
1980	Twinburn	5	T. A. Quinn	Tony Redmond
1981	Daring Run	6	Ted Walsh	Peter McCreery
1982	Daring Run	7	Ted Walsh	Peter McCreery
1983	Royal Vulcan	5	Jonjo O'Neill	Neville Callaghan
1984	Dawn Run	6	Jonjo O'Neill	Paddy Mullins
1985	Fredcoteri	9	Tom Taaffe	Arthur Moore
1986	Herbert United	7	Harry Rogers	Des McDonogh
1987	Deep Idol	7	Brendan Sheridan	P. D. Osborne
1988	Classical Charm	5	Ken Morgan	Al O'Connell
1989	Kingsmill	6	Declan Murphy	Tommy Stack
1990	Nomadic Way	5	Brendan Powell	Barry Hills
1991	Nordic Surprise	4	Charlie Swan	Jim Bolger
1992	Chirkpar	5	Liam Cusack	Jim Bolger
1993	Royal Derbi	8	Declan Murphy	Neville Callaghan
1994	Fortune and Fame	7	Adrian Maguire	Dermot Weld
1995	Fortune and Fame (Note: The 1995 running took place at Fairyhouse)	8	Mark Dwyer	Dermot Weld
1996	Collier Bay	6	Jamie Osborne	Jim Old
1997	Cockney Lad	8	Richard Hughes	Noel Meade
1998	Istabraq	6	Charlie Swan	Aidan O'Brien
1999	Istabraq	7	Charlie Swan	Aidan O'Brien
2000	Istabraq	8	Charlie Swan	Aidan O'Brien
2001	Istabraq	9	Charlie Swan	Aidan O'Brien
2002	Ned Kelly	6	Norman Williamson	Edward O'Grady
2003	Like-A-Butterfly	9	Charlie Swan	Christy Roche
2004	Foreman	6	Thierry Doumen	Thierry Doumen
2005	Macs Joy	6	Barry Geraghty	Jessica Harrington
2006	Brave Inca	8	Tony McCoy	Colm Murphy
2007	Hardy Eustace	10	Conor O'Dwyer	Dessie Hughes
2008	Sizing Europe	6	Andrew McNamara	Henry de Bromhead
2009	Brave Inca	11	Ruby Walsh	Colm Murphy
2010	Solwhit	6	Davy Russell	Charles Byrnes
2011	Hurricane Fly	7	Paul Townend	Willie Mullins
2012	Hurricane Fly	8	Ruby Walsh	Willie Mullins
2013	Hurricane Fly	9	Ruby Walsh	Willie Mullins
2014	Hurricane Fly	10	Ruby Walsh	Willie Mullins
2015	Hurricane Fly	11	Ruby Walsh	Willie Mullins
2016	Faugheen	8	Ruby Walsh	Willie Mullins
2017	Petit Mouchoir	6	David Mullins	Henry de Bromhead
2018	Supasundae	8	Robbie Power	Jessica Harrington
2019	Apple's Jade	7	Jack Kennedy	Gordon Elliott
2020	Honeysuckle	6	Rachael Blackmore	Henry de Bromhead
2021	Honeysuckle	7	Rachael Blackmore	Henry de Bromhead
2022	Honeysuckle	8	Rachael Blackmore	Henry de Bromhead
2023	State Man	6	Paul Townend	Willie Mullins
2024	State Man	7	Paul Townend	Willie Mullins
2025	State Man	8	Paul Townend	Willie Mullins
2026	Brighterdaysahead	7	Jack Kennedy	Gordon Elliott

== See also ==
- Horse racing in Ireland
- List of Irish National Hunt races
