= Dawn Run Mares' Novices' Hurdle =

Hurdle horse race in Britain

Dawn Run Mares' Novices' Hurdle (Ryanair Mares' Novices' Hurdle)
- Class: Grade 2
- Location: Cheltenham Racecourse; Cheltenham, England
- Race type: Hurdle race
- Sponsor: Ryanair
- Website: Cheltenham

Race information
- Distance: 2m 179yd (3,382 metres)
- Surface: Turf
- Track: Left-handed
- Qualification: Four-years-old and up
- Weight: 10 st 6 lb (4yo); 11 st 2 lb (5yo+); Penalties; 5 lb for winners of Class 1 wfa hurdle 3 lb for winners of Class 2 wfa 3 lb for winners of Class 1 handicap hurdle
- Purse: £105,000 (2023); 1st: £59,084

Dawn Run Novices' Hurdle
2026
White Noise	Oldschool Outlaw	Place De La Nation

Previous years
2025
Air Of Entitlement	Sixandahalf	Diva Luna
2024
Golden Ace	Brighterdaysahead	Birdie Or Bust
2023
You Wear It Well	Magical Zoe	Halka Du Tabert
2022
Love Envoi	Ahorsewithnoname	Grangee
2021
Telmesomethinggirl	Magic Daze	Mighty Blue

2020-2016
2020
Concertista	Dolcita	Rayna's World
2019
Eglantine Du Seuil	Concertista	Tintangle
2018
Laurina	Cap Soleil	Champayne Lady
2017
Let's Dance	Barra	Dusky Legend
2016
Limini	Dusky Legend	Bloody Mary

The Dawn Run Mares' Novices' Hurdle, run as the Ryanair Mares' Novices' Hurdle for sponsorship purposes, is a Grade 2 National Hunt hurdle race in Great Britain which is open to fillies and mares aged four years or older. It is run on the New Course at Cheltenham over a distance of about 2 miles and 1 furlong (2 miles and 179 yards, or 3,382 metres), and during its running there are eight hurdles to be jumped. The race is for novice hurdlers, and it is scheduled to take place each year during the Cheltenham Festival in March.

The race was first run in 2016 as a new race at the Cheltenham Festival, expanding the meeting to 28 races. The race was sponsored by Trull House Stud and run as the Trull House Stud Mares' Novices' Hurdle from 2016 to 2018. In 2019 the race was sponsored by Tattersalls in conjunction with a group of National Hunt breeders including Trull House Stud before Daylesford took over as sponsor for the 2020 running. The 2021 race was sponsored by Parnell Properties and Ryanair took over the sponsorship from the 2022 running.

== Records ==
Leading jockey (2 wins):

- Ruby Walsh - Limini (2016), Let's Dance (2017)
- Rachael Blackmore - Telmesomethinggirl (2021), Air Of Entitlement (2025)

Leading trainer (5 wins):

- Willie Mullins - Limini (2016), Let's Dance (2017), Laurina (2018), Eglantine du Seuil (2019), Concertista (2020)

== Winners ==
Year	Winner	Age	Jockey	Trainer
2016	Limini	5	Ruby Walsh	Willie Mullins
2017	Let's Dance	5	Ruby Walsh	Willie Mullins
2018	Laurina	5	Paul Townend	Willie Mullins
2019	Eglantine Du Seuil	5	Noel Fehily	Willie Mullins
2020	Concertista	6	Daryl Jacob	Willie Mullins
2021	Telmesomethinggirl	6	Rachael Blackmore	Henry de Bromhead
2022	Love Envoi	6	Jonathan Burke	Harry Fry
2023	You Wear It Well	6	Gavin Sheehan	Jamie Snowden
2024	Golden Ace	6	Lorcan Williams	Jeremy Scott
2025	Air Of Entitlement	6	Rachael Blackmore	Henry de Bromhead
2026	White Noise	6	Tom Bellamy	Kim Bailey & Mat Nicholls

== See also ==
- Horse racing in Great Britain
- List of British National Hunt races
