= Honeysuckle Mares Novice Hurdle =

Hurdle horse race in Ireland

Honeysuckle Mares Novice Hurdle
2026
Zanoosh	Place De La Nation	Charme De Faust

Previous years
2025
Aurora Vega	That'll Do Moss	Karamoja
2024
Jade De Grugy	Spindleberry	Jetara
2023
Ashroe Diamond	Whatcouldhavebeen	Pink In The Park
2022
Brandy Love	Love Envoi	Hors Piste
2021
Skyace	Gauloise	Hook Up

2020-2011
2019
Honeysuckle	Elfile	Eglantine Du Seuil
2018
Laurina	Lackaneen Leader	Alletrix
2017
Augusta Kate	Let's Dance	Barra
2016
Jer's Girl	Jessber's Dream	Asthuria
2015
Bitofapuzzle	Petite Parisienne	Lyrical Theatre
2014
Adriana Des Mottes	Beluckyagain	Urticaire
2013
Annie Power	Glens Melody	Jennies Jewel
2012
Shadow Eile	Burn And Turn	Dressedtothenines
2011
Knockfierna	Golden Sunbird	Shop Dj

2010-2001
2010
For Bill	Morning Supreme	Premier Victory
2009
Shirley Casper	Alpine Glade	Oligarch Society
2008
Oscar Rebel	Shirley Casper	Bohemian Lass
2007
Grangeclare Lark	Shuil Aris	Chomba Womba
2006
Cailin Alainn	Celestial Wave	La Marianne
2005
Asian Maze	Mrs Wallensky	Reine Des Reines
2004
Greenhall Rambler	Burnt Out	An Culainn Beag
2003
Nobody Told Me	Stashedaway	My Name's Not Bin
2002
Verney Bird	Spirit Leader	Supreme Touch
2001
Bondi Storm	Spirit Leader	Sharon's Touch

2000-1995
2000
Asklynn	Zayta	Make My Day
1999
Site-Leader	Darbela	Mrs Battle
1998
Generosa	Back To The Nest	Cailin Supreme
1997
Windy Bee	Afarka	Boro Bow
1996
Bold Tipperary	Rahan Bridge	Shining Willow
1995
Bless Me Sister	Trench Hill Lass	Lisaleen River

The Honeysuckle Mares Novice Hurdle is a Grade 1 National Hunt hurdle race in Ireland which is open to mares aged four years or older. It is run at Fairyhouse Racecourse over a distance of about 2 miles and 4½ furlongs (4,023 metres), and during its running there are ten hurdle to be jumped. The race is for novice hurdlers, and it is scheduled to take place each year in late March or early April at Fairyhouse's Easter meeting.

Known as the Mares Novice Hurdle Championship Final until 2023, the race was then named in honour of 2019 winner Honeysuckle on her retirement.

The race was awarded Grade 3 status in 2004, raised to Grade 2 in 2011 and then to Grade 1 in 2013.

== Records ==
Leading jockey since 1995 (6 wins):

- Paul Townend - Adriana Des Mottes (2014), Laurina (2018), Brandy Love (2022), Ashroe Diamond (2023), Jade De Grugy (2024), Aurora Vega (2025)

Leading trainer since 1995 (9 wins):

- Willie Mullins – Nobody Told Me (2003), Annie Power (2013), Adriana Des Mottes (2014), Augusta Kate (2017), Laurina (2018), Brandy Love (2022), Ashroe Diamond (2023), Jade De Grugy (2024), Aurora Vega (2025)

== Winners ==
Year	Winner	Age	Jockey	Trainer
1995	Bless Me Sister	6	K F O'Brien	Michael Hourigan
1996	Bold Tipperary	7	J Butler	Michael Butler
1997	Windy Bee	6	Aidan Nolan	Brian Nolan
1998	Generosa	5	T P Hyde (Note: amateur jockey)	John Hassett
1999	Site-Leader	5	Charlie Swan	Paul Nolan
2000	Asklynn	7	Ronan McNally	John Fowler
2001	Bondi Storm	6	Paul Carberry	Noel Meade
2002	Verney Bird	5	Adrian Lane	Michael Halford
2003	Nobody Told Me	5	Ruby Walsh	Willie Mullins
2004	Greenhall Rambler	5	John Cullen	Pat Fahy
2005	Asian Maze	6	Paul Carberry	Thomas Mullins
2006	Cailin Alainn	7	Barry Cash	Charles Byrnes
2007	Grangeclare Lark	6	Roger Loughran	Dessie Hughes
2008	Oscar Rebel	6	Paul Carberry	Liam Burke
2009	Shirley Casper	8	Barry Geraghty	Dessie Hughes
2010	For Bill	7	Davy Russell	Michael Winters
2011	Knockfierna	6	Davy Russell	Charles Byrnes
2012	Shadow Eile	7	Andrew McNamara	Dot Love
2013	Annie Power	5	Ruby Walsh	Willie Mullins
2014	Adriana Des Mottes	4	Paul Townend	Willie Mullins
2015	Bitofapuzzle	7	Noel Fehily	Harry Fry
2016	Jer's Girl	4	Barry Geraghty	Gavin Cromwell
2017	Augusta Kate	6	David Mullins	Willie Mullins
2018	Laurina	5	Paul Townend	Willie Mullins
2019	Honeysuckle	5	Rachael Blackmore	Henry De Bromhead
	no race 2020 (Note: The 2020 running was cancelled because of the COVID-19 pandemic in the Republic of Ireland)
2021	Skyace	6	Jody McGarvey	John Hanlon
2022	Brandy Love	6	Paul Townend	Willie Mullins
2023	Ashroe Diamond	6	Paul Townend	Willie Mullins
2024	Jade De Grugy	5	Paul Townend	Willie Mullins
2025	Aurora Vega	7	Paul Townend	Willie Mullins
2026	Zanoosh	6	Brian Hayes	Colm Murphy

== See also ==
- Horse racing in Ireland
- List of Irish National Hunt races
