= Rachael Blackmore =

Irish National Hunt jockey

Rachael Blackmore MBE
- Blackmore and A Plus Tard after winning the 2021 Betfair Chase

Personal information
- Born: 11 July 1989 (age 37) Killenaule, County Tipperary, Ireland
- Occupation: Jockey

Horse racing career
- Sport: Horse racing

Major racing wins
- Champion Hurdle (2021), (2022); Grand National (2021); Irish Champion Hurdle (2020), (2021), (2022); Cheltenham Gold Cup (2022); Champion Chase (2024); Stayers' Hurdle (2025)

Honours
- Honorary MBE (2023)

Significant horses
- Honeysuckle; Minella Times; A Plus Tard

Rachael Blackmore (born 11 July 1989) is an Irish former National Hunt jockey. In 2021, she became the first female jockey to win the Grand National in the 182-year history of the race. She also became the first woman to be leading jockey at the Cheltenham Festival with six victories, including the Champion Hurdle, in 2021. The following year she became the first female jockey to win the Cheltenham Gold Cup. She announced her immediate retirement on 12 May 2025, having won 575 races as a professional jockey.

Blackmore's achievements saw her named the 2021 RTÉ Sports Person of the Year and the 2021 BBC World Sport Star of the Year.

== Early life ==
Rachael Blackmore was born on 11 July 1989, daughter of a teacher and a farmer (Eimir and Charles), Blackmore grew up on a dairy farm in Killenaule, County Tipperary, Ireland, and first started riding ponies at just two years of age. Growing up she took part in pony club meetings, hunting, eventing and pony racing. She gained a degree in equine science at the University of Limerick, while riding out and competing as an amateur jockey.

== Jockey career ==
Blackmore rode her first winner as an amateur jockey on 10 February 2011, when Stowaway Pearl, trained by John Joseph "Shark" Hanlon, won the Tipperary Ladies’ Handicap Hurdle at Thurles. She turned professional in March 2015, having ridden eleven point-to-point winners and seven winners under the Rules of Racing as an amateur rider. Her first winner as a professional was Most Honourable, trained by Hanlon, at Clonmel on 3 September 2015. In 2017, she became the first woman to win the conditional riders' championship in Ireland.

Blackmore had her first ride in the Grand National in 2018. Her mount, Alpha des Obeaux, trained by Mouse Morris, went off at 33/1 and fell at the fifteenth fence, the Chair.

Her first Cheltenham Festival winner came in 2019 when A Plus Tard landed the Chase Brothers Novices' Handicap Chase. She then gained her first Grade 1 victory when Minella Indo won the Albert Bartlett Novices' Hurdle. Both winners were trained by Henry de Bromhead for whom Blackmore was by now riding as stable jockey. In the 2019 Grand National Blackmore finished in tenth place on the de Bromhead-trained 66/1 chance Valseur Lido.

Blackmore's first Grade 1 race victory in Ireland came in April 2019 when Honeysuckle won the Mares' Novice Hurdle Championship Final at Fairyhouse. Blackmore finished the season with 90 winners and took the runner-up spot in the Irish jump racing Champion Jockey competition behind Paul Townend. Honeysuckle provided Blackmore with another Cheltenham Festival win in the Close Brothers Mares' Hurdle in 2020. Blackmore finished third in the Irish National Hunt championship during the curtailed 2019–20 season.

In 2021, she achieved two notable firsts at the Cheltenham Festival, becoming the first female jockey to partner a winner of the Champion Hurdle when she rode Honeysuckle to victory and, by finishing with six winners across the four days, became the first female jockey to win the Ruby Walsh Trophy for leading Cheltenham jockey.

On 10 April of the same year, Blackmore rode Minella Times to victory in the 2021 Grand National, becoming the first female jockey to win the race. The gelding, trained by de Bromhead, went off as fourth favourite at 11/1 and, having given Blackmore a "sensational spin", passed the post 6½ lengths in front of stablemate and runner-up Balko Des Flos. Due to COVID-19 protocols, there were no spectators on the course to witness Blackmore's historic victory. Interviewed by ITV after the race, she said: "I don't feel male or female right now. I don't even feel human.... It's unbelievable". The following year she again partnered Minella Times in the race. Carrying top weight, Minella Times went off second favourite but fell at Valentine's Brook. In 2023, she finished last of the seventeen finishers on Ain't That A Shame, trained by de Bromhead. In 2024 and 2025, she rode Minella Indo for de Bromhead, finishing third in 2024 and ninth in 2025.

At the 2022 Cheltenham Festival, Blackmore secured a repeat win on Honeysuckle in the Champion Hurdle and then became the first female jockey to win the Cheltenham Gold Cup, riding favourite A Plus Tard to a 15-length victory. At the 2023 Festival, she rode Honeysuckle to win the David Nicholson Mares' Hurdle for a second time on the mare's final racecourse appearance. Blackmore had ridden Honeysuckle in all her races, including thirteen Grade 1 wins in Britain and Ireland. Victory on Captain Guinness in the Queen Mother Champion Chase in 2024 and on Bob Olinger in the Stayers' Hurdle in 2025 gave Blackmore a full-house of feature races at the Festival. A fall at Downpatrick in September 2024, in which she sustained an injury to her neck, left Blackmore unable to race for three months.

Although primarily a National Hunt jockey, Blackmore occasionally rode on the flat, achieving twelve successes over her career. The first was in May 2017 and the most notable was the Group 3 Brontë Cup at York in May 2024, riding Term Of Endearment for de Bromhead.

On 12 May 2025, Blackmore announced her immediate retirement from professional racing. She wrote this statement on X:

My days of being a jockey have come to an end. I feel the time is right. I'm sad but I'm also incredibly grateful for what my life has been for the past 16 years. I just feel so lucky to have been legged up on the horses I have, and to have experienced success I never even dreamt could be possible.

In her final race two days earlier, she had ridden Ma Belle Etoile to victory for de Bromhead at Cork. It was the 575th winner of her career as a professional jockey.

== Later career ==
Blackmore joined the ITV1 commentary team to cover the 2026 Grand National. The team included fellow Grand National-winning jockeys Mick Fitzgerald, Sir Tony McCoy, and Ruby Walsh.

== Personal life ==
Blackmore married her long-term partner, jockey Brian Hayes, in January 2026. On 3 June 2026, the couple announced the birth of their first child, a son called Bowie Martin Hayes.

== Notable victories ==
=== Cheltenham Festival winners (18) ===
- Cheltenham Gold Cup – (1) – A Plus Tard (2022)
- Queen Mother Champion Chase – (1) – Captain Guinness (2024)
- Stayers' Hurdle - (1) – Bob Olinger (2025)
- Supreme Novices' Hurdle – (1) – Slade Steel (2024)
- Baring Bingham Novices' Hurdle – (1) – Bob Olinger (2021)
- Champion Bumper – (1) – Sir Gerhard (2021)
- Champion Hurdle – (2) – Honeysuckle (2021, 2022)
- Centenary Novices' Handicap Chase – (1) – A Plus Tard (2019)
- David Nicholson Mares' Hurdle – (2) – Honeysuckle (2020, 2023)
- Dawn Run Mares' Novices' Hurdle – (2) – Telmesomethinggirl (2021), Air Of Entitlement (2025)
- Golden Miller Novices' Chase – (1) – Bob Olinger (2022)
- Ryanair Chase – (2) – Allaho (2021), Envoi Allen (2023)
- Albert Bartlett Novices' Hurdle – (1) – Minella Indo (2019)
- Triumph Hurdle – (1) – Quilixios (2021)

=== Other major wins ===
(Republic of Ireland) Ireland

- Arkle Novice Chase – (1) – Notebook (2020)
- Hatton's Grace Hurdle – (3) – Honeysuckle (2019, 2020, 2021)
- Irish Champion Hurdle – (3) – Honeysuckle (2020, 2021, 2022)
- Irish Daily Mirror Novice Hurdle – (1) – Minella Indo (2019)
- Ladbrokes Champion Chase – (1) – Envoi Allen (2022)
- Mares Novice Hurdle Championship Final – (1) – Honeysuckle (2019)
- Paddy's Reward Club Chase – (2) – A Plus Tard (2019), Envoi Allen (2021)
- Punchestown Champion Hurdle – (2) – Honeysuckle (2021, 2022)
- Racing Post Novice Chase – (1) – Notebook (2019)
- Slaney Novice Hurdle – (1) – Bob Olinger (2021)

(United Kingdom) Great Britain

- Betfair Chase – (1) – A Plus Tard (2021)
- Grand National – (1) – Minella Times (2021)
- Top Novices' Hurdle – (1) – Inthepocket (2023)

== Awards ==
- On 17 December 2021, Blackmore was named The Irish Times' Ireland Sportswoman of the Year 2021.
- The same week, she was crowned Horse Racing Ireland Irish Racing Hero and RTÉ Sports Person of the Year.
- On 19 December 2021, she received the BBC Sports Personality World Sport Star of the Year.
- In 2023, Blackmore was appointed an Honorary Member of the Order of the British Empire (MBE) in the 2023 Special Honours for services to sport.
- On 8 December 2025, she received the Contribution to the Industry Award at the annual Horse Racing Ireland Awards.
- On 9 April 2026, she was inducted onto the 'Grand National legends roll of honour' on the opening day of the Aintree Festival.
- At the same event, she had a plaque mounted on the wall of the new Alcohol-Free bar named after her, at Aintree Racecourse.

Achievements
Preceded by Khabib Nurmagomedov	BBC World Sport Star of the Year; 2021	Succeeded by Lionel Messi
