= December Hurdle =

Hurdle horse race in Ireland

Matheson Hurdle
2025
Lossiemouth	Brighterdaysahead	Casheldale Lad

Previous years
2024
Brighterdaysahead	Winter Fog	State Man
2023
State Man	Impaire Et Passe	Echoes In Rain
2022
State Man	Vauban	Sharjah
2021
Sharjah	Zanahiyr	Saint Roi

2020-2011
2020
Sharjah	Aspire Tower	Petit Mouchoir
2019
Sharjah	Petit Mouchoir	Coeur Sublime
2018
Sharjah	Supasundae	Tombstone
2017
Mick Jazz	Cilaos Emery	Campeador
2016
Petit Mouchoir	Nichols Canyon	Ivanovich Gorbatov
2015
Nichols Canyon	Identity Thief	Plinth
2014
Hurricane Fly	Jezki	Arctic Fire
2013
Hurricane Fly	Jezki	Our Conor
2012
Hurricane Fly	Unaccompanied	Thousand Stars
2011
Unaccompanied	Thousand Stars	Oscars Well

2010-2001
2010
Hurricane Fly	Solwhit	Luska Lad
2009
Solwhit	Sublimity	Jumbo Rio
2008
Sublimity	Won In The Dark	Brave Inca
2007
Al Eile	Hardy Eustace	Jazz Messenger
2006
Brave Inca	Iktitaf	Silent Oscar
2005
Brave Inca	Harchibald	Newmill
2004
Macs Joy	Brave Inca	Hardy Eustace
2003
Golden Cross	Spirit Leader	Flame Creek
2002
Liss A Paoraigh	Stage Affair	Turtleback
2001
Istabraq	Bust Out	Penny Rich

2000-1991
2000
Moscow Flyer	Stage Affair	Mantles Prince
1999
Istabraq	Derrymoyle	Golden Rule
1998
Istabraq	Shantarini	Gazalani
1997
Istabraq	Punting Pete	Lady Daisy
1996
Theatreworld	Hill Society	Cockney Lad
1995
Kharasar	Sambara	Punting Pete
1994
Boro Eight	Tropical Lake	Magic Feeling
1993
Fortune And Fame	Padashpan	Royal Derbi
1992
Novello Allegro	Muir Station	Crowded House
1991
Galevilla Express	Clippie Lad	Nancy Myles

1990-1988
1990
Grabel	Jennycomequick	Welsh Bard
1989
Grabel	Elementary	Wolf Of Badenoch
1988
Grabel	Cloughtaney	Lemhill

The December Hurdle is a Grade 1 National Hunt hurdle race in Ireland which is open to horses aged four years or older. It is run at Leopardstown over a distance of about 2 miles (3,219 metres), and during its running there are eight hurdles to be jumped. The race is scheduled to take place each year during the Christmas Festival meeting in late December.

Prior to 2013 the race was named the Istabraq Festival Hurdle in honour of Istabraq, who won it four times. The race was run as the Ryanair Hurdle from 2013 to 2018 when Ryanair sponsored the race. Matheson took over the sponsorship from the 2019 running. Former titles of the event included the paddypower.com iPhone App Hurdle, Sean P. Graham Memorial Hurdle and the Bookmakers Hurdle. The race was first run in 1986, and it has held Grade 1 status since 2002. It is often used as a trial for the Champion Hurdle at the Cheltenham Festival. Five horses have won both races in the same season – Istabraq three times, Hurricane Fly twice and Brave Inca, State Man and Lossiemouth once each.

== Records ==
Most successful horse (4 wins):

- Istabraq – 1997, 1998, 1999, 2001
- Hurricane Fly – 2010, 2012, 2013, 2014
- Sharjah – 2018, 2019, 2020, 2021

Most successful jockey (6 wins):

- Charlie Swan – Novello Allegro (1992), Theatreworld (1996), Istabraq (1997, 1998, 1999, 2001)

Most successful trainer (12 wins):

- Willie Mullins - Hurricane Fly (2010, 2012, 2013, 2014), Nichols Canyon (2015), Sharjah (2018, 2019, 2020, 2021), State Man (2022, 2023), Lossiemouth (2025)

== Winners ==
Year	Winner	Age	Jockey	Trainer
1986	Derrymore Boy	4	Tony Mullins	Paddy Mullins
1987	Cloughtaney	6	Tony Mullins	Paddy Mullins
1988	Grabel	5	Willie Mullins (Note: amateur jockey)	Paddy Mullins
1989	Grabel	6	Tony Mullins	Paddy Mullins
1990	Grabel	7	Tony Mullins	Paddy Mullins
1991	Galevilla Express	4	Colin Bowens	Victor Bowens
1992	Novello Allegro	4	Charlie Swan	Noel Meade
1993	Fortune and Fame	6	Brendan Sheridan	Dermot Weld
1994	Boro Eight	8	Tommy Treacy	Paddy Mullins
1995	Kharasar	5	Mark Dwyer	Tony Mullins
1996	Theatreworld	4	Charlie Swan	Aidan O'Brien
1997	Istabraq	5	Charlie Swan	Aidan O'Brien
1998	Istabraq	6	Charlie Swan	Aidan O'Brien
1999	Istabraq	7	Charlie Swan	Aidan O'Brien
2000	Moscow Flyer	6	Barry Geraghty	Jessica Harrington
2001	Istabraq	9	Charlie Swan	Aidan O'Brien
2002	Liss A Paoraigh	7	Barry Geraghty	John Kiely
2003	Golden Cross	4	Adrian Lane	Michael Halford
2004	Macs Joy	5	Barry Geraghty	Jessica Harrington
2005	Brave Inca	7	Tony McCoy	Colm Murphy
2006	Brave Inca	8	Ruby Walsh	Colm Murphy
2007	Al Eile	7	Timmy Murphy	John Queally
2008	Sublimity	8	Philip Carberry	Robert Hennessy
2009	Solwhit	5	Davy Russell	Charles Byrnes
2010	Hurricane Fly	6	Paul Townend	Willie Mullins
2011	Unaccompanied	4	Paul Townend	Dermot Weld
2012	Hurricane Fly	8	Ruby Walsh	Willie Mullins
2013	Hurricane Fly	9	Ruby Walsh	Willie Mullins
2014	Hurricane Fly	10	Ruby Walsh	Willie Mullins
2015	Nichols Canyon	5	Ruby Walsh	Willie Mullins
2016	Petit Mouchoir	5	Bryan Cooper	Henry de Bromhead
2017	Mick Jazz	6	Davy Russell	Gordon Elliott
2018	Sharjah	5	Patrick Mullins	Willie Mullins
2019	Sharjah	6	Patrick Mullins	Willie Mullins
2020	Sharjah	7	Patrick Mullins	Willie Mullins
2021	Sharjah	8	Patrick Mullins	Willie Mullins
2022	State Man	5	Paul Townend	Willie Mullins
2023	State Man	6	Paul Townend	Willie Mullins
2024	Brighterdaysahead	5	Sam Ewing	Gordon Elliott
2025	Lossiemouth	6	Paul Townend	Willie Mullins

== See also ==
- Horse racing in Ireland
- List of Irish National Hunt races
