= Olympian Cup =

Hurdle horse race in Britain

- Class: Premier Handicap
- Location: Cheltenham Racecourse; Cheltenham, England
- Inaugurated: 1993
- Race type: Hurdle race
- Sponsor: BetMGM
- Website: Cheltenham

Race information
- Distance: 2m 5f (4,225 metres)
- Surface: Turf
- Track: Left-handed
- Qualification: Four-years-old and up
- Weight: Handicap
- Purse: £110,000 (2025); 1st: £61,897

Olympian Cup
2026
Jingko Blue	Franciscan Rock	Storm Heart

Previous years
2025
Jimmy Du Seuil	Impose Toi	Ballyadam
2024
Langer Dan	Ballyadam	Shanbally Kid
2023
Langer Dan	An Epic Song	Camprond
2022
Commander Of Fleet	Fastorslow	Ashdale Bob
2021
Heaven Help Us	Craigneiche	Tea Clipper

2020-2011
2020
Dame De Compagnie	Black Tears	Thosedaysaregone
2019
William Henry	Wicklow Brave	Ballyandy
2018
Bleu Berry	Topofthegame	Barra
2017
Supasundae	Taquin Du Seuil	Who Dares Wins
2016
Diamond King	Long House Hall	Ubak
2015
Aux Ptits Soins	Zabana	Activial
2014
Whisper	Get Me Out of Here	Bayan
2013
Medinas	Meister Eckhart	Fiveforthree
2012
Son of Flicka	Get Me Out of Here	Veiled
2011
Carlito Brigante	Bothy	Orsippus

2010-2001
2010
Spirit River	Tullamore Dew	James De Vassy
2009
Ninetieth Minute	Mirage Dore	Pause And Clause
2008
Naiad du Misselot	Kicks For Free	Junior
2007
Burntoakboy	Powerstation	Baron De Feypo
2006
Sky's The Limit	Strangely Brown	Dom d'Orgeval
2005
Idole First	Dancing Bay	Tumbling Dice
2004
Monkerhostin	Court Shareef	Rhinestone Cowboy
2003
Xenophon	Samon	Spectrometer
2002
Ilnamar	Joss Naylor	Master Tern

2000-1993
2000
What's Up Boys	Native Dara	Ross Moff
1999
Khayrawani	Miltonfield	Generosa
1998
Top Cees	Khayrawani	Royal Marine
1997
Big Strand	Allegation	Castle Sweep
1996
Trainglot	Treasure Again	New Co
1995
Chance Coffey	Derrymoyle	Time for a Run
1994
Time for a Run	So Proud	Chance Coffey
1993
Olympian	Sillars Stalker	Yellow Spring

The Olympian Cup is a Premier Handicap National Hunt hurdle race in Great Britain which is open to horses aged four years or older. It is run on the Old Course at Cheltenham over a distance of about 2 miles and 5 furlongs (4,225 metres), and during its running there are ten hurdles to be jumped. It is a handicap race, and it is scheduled to take place each year during the Cheltenham Festival in March.

The event was established in 1993, and was sponsored by Coral from its inception until the 2025 running. The inaugural winner, Olympian, was given a bonus prize of £50,000 for having won the Imperial Cup the previous weekend, and it was announced in 2026 that the race would from 2027 be named the Olympian Cup in his honour.

The race was promoted to Grade 3 status in 1999 and was re-classified as a Premier Handicap from the 2023 running when Grade 3 status was renamed by the British Horseracing Authority. Coral announced the end of their sponsorship in January 2026. BetMGM took over the sponsorship from the 2026 running.

There were high winds on the day of the planned running in 2008, so the Coral Cup was rescheduled and run on Cheltenham's New Course. The distance of the rearranged event was 2 miles and 4½ furlongs.

== Records ==
Most successful horse (2 wins):

- Langer Dan - 2023, 2024

Leading jockey (3 wins):

- Davy Russell – Naiad de Misselot (2008), Carlito Brigante (2011), Diamond King (2016)
- Barry Geraghty - Sky's The Limit (2006), Spirit River (2010), Dame De Compagnie (2020)

Leading trainer (5 wins):

- Nicky Henderson - Spirit River (2010), Whisper (2014), William Henry (2019), Dame De Compagnie (2020), Jingko Blue (2026)

== Winners ==
- Weights given in stones and pounds.

Year	Winner	Age	Weight	Jockey	Trainer
1993	Olympian	6	10-00	Peter Scudamore	Martin Pipe
1994	Time for a Run	7	11-08	Charlie Swan	Edward O'Grady
1995	Chance Coffey	10	10-00	Gerry O'Neill	Pat O'Donnell
1996	Trainglot	9	10-03	Mark Dwyer	Jimmy FitzGerald
1997	Big Strand	8	10-00	Jamie Evans	Martin Pipe
1998	Top Cees	8	10-00	Barry Fenton	Lynda Ramsden
1999	Khayrawani	7	11-03	Fran Berry	Christy Roche
2000	What's Up Boys	6	10-03	Paul Flynn (Note: amateur jockey)	Philip Hobbs
	no race 2001 (Note: The 2001 running was cancelled because of a foot-and-mouth crisis)
2002	Ilnamar	6	10-05	Rodi Greene	Martin Pipe
2003	Xenophon	7	11-00	Mick Fitzgerald	Tony Martin
2004	Monkerhostin	7	10-08	Richard Johnson	Philip Hobbs
2005	Idole First	6	10–10	Alan O'Keeffe	Venetia Williams
2006	Sky's the Limit	5	11–12	Barry Geraghty	Edward O'Grady
2007	Burntoakboy	9	09-12	Sam Jones	Richard Newland
2008	Naiad du Misselot	7	10–13	Davy Russell	Ferdy Murphy
2009	Ninetieth Minute	6	10-03	Paddy Flood	Tom Taaffe
2010	Spirit River	5	11-02	Barry Geraghty	Nicky Henderson
2011	Carlito Brigante	5	10–12	Davy Russell	Gordon Elliott
2012	Son of Flicka	8	10-06	Jason Maguire	Donald McCain
2013	Medinas	6	11–10	Wayne Hutchinson	Alan King
2014	Whisper	6	11-06	Nico de Boinville	Nicky Henderson
2015	Aux Ptits Soins	5	10-07	Sam Twiston-Davies	Paul Nicholls
2016	Diamond King	8	11-03	Davy Russell	Gordon Elliott
2017	Supasundae	7	11-04	Robbie Power	Jessica Harrington
2018	Bleu Berry	7	11-02	Mark Walsh	Willie Mullins
2019	William Henry	9	11-10	Nico de Boinville	Nicky Henderson
2020	Dame De Compagnie	7	10-12	Barry Geraghty	Nicky Henderson
2021	Heaven Help Us	7	10-02	Richard Condon	Paul Hennessy
2022	Commander Of Fleet	7	11–10	Shane Fitzgerald	Gordon Elliott
2023	Langer Dan	6	11–00	Harry Skelton	Dan Skelton
2024	Langer Dan	7	11–08	Harry Skelton	Dan Skelton
2025	Jimmy Du Seuil	6	11–07	Danny Mullins	Willie Mullins
2026	Jingko Blue	7	11-03	James Bowen	Nicky Henderson

== See also ==
- Horse racing in Great Britain
- List of British National Hunt races
