= Solwhit =

French-bred Thoroughbred racehorse

- Solwhit and jockey Davy Russell at the 2009 WBX Fighting Fifth Hurdle
- Sire: Solon
- Grandsire: Local Suitor
- Dam: Toowhit Towhee
- Damsire: Lucky North
- Sex: Gelding
- Foaled: 2004
- Country: France
- Colour: Bay
- Breeder: Haras de Preaux
- Owner: Top Of The Hill Syndicate
- Trainer: Charles Byrnes
- Earnings: £893,378

Major wins
- Aintree Hurdle (2009); Punchestown Champion Hurdle (2009); Morgiana Hurdle (2009, 2010); December Festival Hurdle (2009); Irish Champion Hurdle (2010); World Hurdle (2013); Liverpool Hurdle (2013)

Solwhit (foaled on April 17, 2004 in France) was a French-bred, Irish-trained thoroughbred racehorse. A specialist hurdler, he competed in National Hunt races. He died on 7 November 2014 following a fall whilst schooling in Tipperary.

== Background ==
Solwhit was sired by the German stallion Solon out of the mare Toowhit Towhee. He was owned by the Top Of The Hill Syndicate, bought by bloodstock agent Sean Tiernan and was trained by Charles Byrnes. Throughout his time as a racehorse, he had been predominantly ridden by Davy Russell.

== Racing career ==
Solwhit started racing as a three-year-old in September 2007 when he was entered into the Prix De Belleville, finishing well off the lead. His first ever win came in his second race, the Prix Verdi Hurdle in November 2007 in which he bested a field of 19 for the victory. Solwhit’s first major victory came in February 2009 when he won the Red Mills Trial Hurdle at Gowran Park in County Kilkenny, Ireland, a Grade 2 National Hunt race. In that race, he defeated Jazz Messenger by 3.5 lengths for the victory.

Solwhit's first Grade I win came in April 2009 in the Aintree Hurdle at Aintree Racecourse in Merseyside, England. In that race, he defeated a field of 16 and held off Fiveforthree by just a half of a length for the victory. In his very next race, Solwhit won the 2009 Punchestown Champion Hurdle at Punchestown Racecourse in Naas, County Kildare, Ireland.

Solwhit’s success at the end of the 2008-2009 racing season carried over into the 2009-2010 season when he won his third Grade 1 race, the Dobbins & Madigans at Punchestown Hurdle at Punchestown Racecourse in November 2009 followed by the December Festival Hurdle at Leopardstown Racecourse in Leopardstown, County Dublin. En route to the December victory, Solwhit defeated Sublimity by two lengths. His fifth Grade 1 victory game in January 2010 when he won the Irish Champion Hurdle, also held at Leopardstown Racecourse. There, he defeated a field of seven, including Sublimity and Celestial Halo. Solwhit added a sixth Grade 1 victory when taking a second victory in the Dobbins & Madigans Hurdle in November 2010. In his three remaining races of the 2010/2011 season, Solwhit finished second to Hurricane Fly in the Hatton's Grace Hurdle, December Festival Hurdle and Irish Champion Hurdle.

After a break of almost two years, Solwhit returned to finish second to Bog Warrior at Punchestown in December 2012. In January 2013 he recorded his first win since November 2010 when winning the Limestone Lad Hurdle at Naas. On 14 March 2013, the gelding was sent to the Cheltenham Festival to contest the World Hurdle and started at odds of 17/2 in a field of thirteen runners. Ridden by Paul Carberry, he was held up in the early stages before moving up towards the leaders in the straight. He took the lead on the run-in and won by two and a half lengths from Celestial Halo. On 6 April Solwhit won the Liverpool Hurdle, beating Holywell by three lengths.
