= Paddy Power Future Champions Novice Hurdle =

Hurdle horse race in Ireland

Future Champions Novice Hurdle
2025
Skylight Hustle	Carrigmoornaspruce	Love Me Tender

Previous years
2024
Romeo Coolio	Bleu De Vassy	Eastern Legend
2023
Caldwell Potter	Predators Gold	Down Memory Lane
2022
Facile Vega	Il Etait Temps	Ashroe Diamond
2021
Mighty Potter	Three Stripe Life	Farout

2020-2011
2019
Abacadabras	Heaven Help Us	Embittered
2018
Aramon	Sancta Simona	Tintangle
2017
Whiskey Sour	Le Richebourg	Hardline
2016
Saturnas	Brelade	Sunni May
2015
Long Dog	Tombstone	Petit Mouchoir
2014
Sizing John	Sub Lieutenant	Golantilla
2013
The Tullow Tank	King of The Picts	Moyle Park
2012
Jezki	Waaheb	Bright New Dawn
2011
Cash And Go	Dylan Ross	Sous Les Cieux

2010-2001
2010
First Lieutenant	Zaidpour	Hidden Cyclone
2009
Hollo Ladies	Saludos	Fionnegas
2008
Hurricane Fly	Go Native	Zarinava
2007
Whatuthink	Forpadydeplasterer	Cork All Star
2006
De Valira	Catch Me	Sizing Europe
2005
Mr Nosie	Blueberry Boy	Wanango
2004
Royal Paradise	Leonardo de Vinci	Man About Town
2003
Mariah Rollins	Newmill	Mark The Man
2002
Solerina	Central House	Only two ran
2001
Sacundai	Yeoman's Point	Rathgar Beau

2000-1996
2000
Ned Kelly	Grinkov	Bust Out
1999
Youlneverwalkalone	Parkgate	Liscahill Hill
1998
Joe Mac	Colonel Yeager	Slaney Native
1997
His Song	Unarmed	French Ballerina
1996
Istabraq	Palette	Delphi Lodge

The Paddy Power Future Champions Novice Hurdle is a Grade 1 National Hunt race in Ireland. It is run at Leopardstown Racecourse at the end of December during the Christmas Festival, over a distance of about 2 miles (3,219 metres) and during its running there are 8 hurdles to be jumped.

The race was originally run over 2 miles and 2 furlongs, before being reduced to its present distance in 1997. It was awarded Grade 1 status in 2008 and is seen as a key race prior to the Cheltenham Festival in March. The race is currently sponsored by the Paddy Power bookmaking company.

== Records ==
Most successful jockey (4 wins):

- Paul Townend - Hurricane Fly (2008), Saturnas (2016), Appreciate It (2020), Facile Vega (2022)
- Jack Kennedy - Abracadabras (2019), Mighty Potter (2021), Caldwell Potter (2023), Skylight Hustle (2025)

Most successful trainer (7 wins):

- Willie Mullins – Hurricane Fly (2008), Long Dog (2015), Saturnas (2016), Whiskey Sour (2018), Aramon (2018), Appreciate It (2020), Facile Vega (2022)

== Recent Winners ==
Year	Winner	Age	Jockey	Trainer
1996	Istabraq	4	Charlie Swan	Aidan O'Brien
1997	His Song	4	Richard Hughes	Mouse Morris
1998	Joe Mac	4	Charlie Swan	Christy Roche
1999	Youlneverwalkalone	5	Conor O'Dwyer	Christy Roche
2000	Ned Kelly	4	Norman Williamson	Edward O'Grady
2001	Sacundai	4	Adrian Maguire	Edward O'Grady
2002	Solerina	4	Ruby Walsh	James Bowe
2003	Mariah Rollins	5	David Casey	Pat Fahy
2004	Royal Paradise	4	Conor O'Dwyer	Thomas Foley
2005	Mr Nosie	4	Paul Carberry	Noel Meade
2006	De Valira	4	Andrew Lynch	Michael O'Brien
2007	Whatuthink	5	Conor O'Dwyer	Oliver McKiernan
2008	Hurricane Fly	4	Paul Townend	Willie Mullins
2009	Hollo Ladies	4	Davy Condon	Noel Meade
2010	First Lieutenant	5	Davy Russell	Mouse Morris
2011	Cash And Go	4	Andrew Lynch	Edward O'Grady
2012	Jezki	4	Robbie Power	Jessica Harrington
2013	The Tullow Tank	5	Danny Mullins	Philip Fenton
2014	Sizing John	4	Johnny Burke	Henry de Bromhead
2015	Long Dog	5	Ruby Walsh	Willie Mullins
2016	Saturnas	5	Paul Townend	Willie Mullins
2017	Whiskey Sour	4	David Mullins	Willie Mullins
2018	Aramon	5	Ruby Walsh	Willie Mullins
2019	Abracadabras	5	Jack Kennedy	Gordon Elliott
2020	Appreciate It	6	Paul Townend	Willie Mullins
2021	Mighty Potter	4	Jack Kennedy	Gordon Elliott
2022	Facile Vega	5	Paul Townend	Willie Mullins
2023	Caldwell Potter	5	Jack Kennedy	Gordon Elliott
2023	Romeo Coolio	5	Sam Ewing	Gordon Elliott
2025	Skylight Hustle	5	Jack Kennedy	Gordon Elliott

== See also ==
- Horse racing in Ireland
- List of Irish National Hunt races
