= Punchestown Champion Hurdle =

Hurdle horse race in Ireland

- Class: Grade 1
- Location: Punchestown; County Kildare, Ireland
- Race type: Hurdle race
- Sponsor: Boodles
- Website: Punchestown

Race information
- Distance: 2 miles (3,219 metres)
- Surface: Turf
- Track: Right-handed
- Qualification: Four-years-old and up
- Weight: 11 st 4 lb (4yo); 12 st 0 lb (5yo+); Allowances; 7 lb for fillies and mares
- Purse: €250,000 (2021); 1st: €147,500

Punchestown Champion Hurdle
2026
Lossiemouth	Golden Ace	Wilful

Previous years
2025
State Man	Golden Ace	Kargese
2024
State Man	Irish Point	Colonel Mustard
2023
State Man	Vauban	Colonel Mustard
2022
Honeysuckle	Echoes In Rain	Darasso
2021
Honeysuckle	Sharjah	Epatante

2020-2011
2019
Buveur D'Air	Supasundae	Wicklow Brave
2018
Supasundae	Wicklow Brave	Bleu Berry
2017
Wicklow Brave	My Tent Or Yours	Arctic Fire
2016
Vroum Vroum Mag	Identity Thief	My Tent Or Yours
2015
Faugheen	Arctic Fire	Dell' Arca
2014
Jezki	Hurricane Fly	Steps To Freedom
2013
Hurricane Fly	Thousand Stars	Rock On Ruby
2012
Hurricane Fly	Zaidpour	Thousand Stars
2011
Hurricane Fly	Thousand Stars	Binocular
2010
Hurricane Fly	Solwhit	Thousand Stars

2010-2003
2009
Solwhit	Punjabi	Quevega
2008
Punjabi	Sublimity	Ebaziyan
2007
Silent Oscar	Macs Joy	Hardy Eustace
2006
Macs Joy	Brave Inca	Hardy Eustace
2005
Brave Inca	Harchibald	Macs Joy
2004
Hardy Eustace	Rooster Booster	Fota Island
2003
Quazar	Back In Front	In The Forge

The Punchestown Champion Hurdle is a Grade 1 National Hunt hurdle race in Ireland which is open to horses aged four years or older. It is run at Punchestown over a distance of about 2 miles (3,219 metres), and during its running there are nine hurdles to be jumped. The race is scheduled to take place each year during the Punchestown Festival in late April or early May.

The present version of the race was introduced in 1999, and it was initially sponsored by Shell. Several different sponsors have followed, including Emo Oil, ACCBank, Rabobank, Racing Post, Betdaq and Paddy Power. Its current sponsor, Boodles, began supporting the race in 2024.

The field usually includes horses which ran previously in the Champion Hurdle at Cheltenham, and the last to win both events in the same year was Lossiemouth in 2026. For a period the race was restricted to horses aged five or older, but the minimum age was lowered to four in 2009.

== Records ==
Most successful horse since 1999 (4 wins):

- Hurricane Fly - 2010, 2011, 2012, 2013

Leading jockey since 1999 (6 wins):

- Ruby Walsh - Davenport Milenium (2002), Hurricane Fly (2011, 2012, 2013), Faugheen (2015), Vroum Vroum Mag (2016)

Leading trainer since 1999 (12 wins):

- Willie Mullins – Davenport Milenium (2002), Hurricane Fly (2010, 2011, 2012, 2013), Faugheen (2015), Vroum Vroum Mag (2016), Wicklow Brave (2017), State Man (2023, 2024, 2025), Lossiemouth (2026)

== Winners since 1999 ==
Year	Winner	Age	Jockey	Trainer
1999	Istabraq	7	Charlie Swan	Aidan O'Brien
2000	Grimes	7	Charlie Swan	Christy Roche
2001	Moscow Flyer (Note: The 2001 running took place at Leopardstown)	7	Barry Geraghty	Jessica Harrington
2002	Davenport Milenium	6	Ruby Walsh	Willie Mullins
2003	Quazar	5	Tony Dobbin	Jonjo O'Neill
2004	Hardy Eustace	7	Conor O'Dwyer	Dessie Hughes
2005	Brave Inca	7	Tony McCoy	Colm Murphy
2006	Macs Joy	7	Barry Geraghty	Jessica Harrington
2007	Silent Oscar	8	Robbie Power	Harry Rogers
2008	Punjabi	5	Barry Geraghty	Nicky Henderson
2009	Solwhit	5	Davy Russell	Charles Byrnes
2010	Hurricane Fly	6	Paul Townend	Willie Mullins
2011	Hurricane Fly	7	Ruby Walsh	Willie Mullins
2012	Hurricane Fly	8	Ruby Walsh	Willie Mullins
2013	Hurricane Fly	9	Ruby Walsh	Willie Mullins
2014	Jezki	6	Tony McCoy	Jessica Harrington
2015	Faugheen	7	Ruby Walsh	Willie Mullins
2016	Vroum Vroum Mag	7	Ruby Walsh	Willie Mullins
2017	Wicklow Brave	8	Patrick Mullins (Note: amateur rider)	Willie Mullins
2018	Supasundae	8	Robbie Power	Jessica Harrington
2019	Buveur d'Air	8	Davy Russell	Nicky Henderson
	no race 2020 (Note: The 2020 running was cancelled because of the COVID-19 pandemic in the Republic of Ireland)
2021	Honeysuckle	7	Rachael Blackmore	Henry de Bromhead
2022	Honeysuckle	8	Rachael Blackmore	Henry de Bromhead
2023	State Man	6	Paul Townend	Willie Mullins
2024	State Man	7	Paul Townend	Willie Mullins
2025	State Man	8	Paul Townend	Willie Mullins
2026	Lossiemouth	7	Paul Townend	Willie Mullins

== See also ==
- Horse racing in Ireland
- List of Irish National Hunt races
