= Hatton's Grace Hurdle =

Hurdle horse race in Ireland

- Class: Grade 1
- Location: Fairyhouse; County Meath, Ireland
- Inaugurated: 1994
- Race type: Hurdle race
- Sponsor: Bar One Racing
- Website: Fairyhouse

Race information
- Distance: 2m 4f (4,023 metres)
- Surface: Turf
- Track: Right-handed
- Qualification: Four-years-old and up
- Weight: 11 st 6 lb (4yo); 11 st 10 lb (5yo+); Allowances; 7 lb for fillies and mares
- Purse: €41,300 (2020); 1st: €70,000

Hatton's Grace Hurdle
2025
Teahupoo	Ballyburn	Maxxum

Previous years
2024
Lossiemouth	Teahupoo	Beacon Edge
2023
Teahupoo	Impaire Et Passe	Ashroe Diamond
2022
Teahupoo	Klassical Dream	Honeysuckle
2021
Honeysuckle	Ronald Pump	Abacadabras

2020-2011
2020
Honeysuckle	Ronald Pump	Beacon Edge
2019
Honeysuckle	Bacardys	Apple's Jade
2018
Apple's Jade	Supasundae	Limini
2017
Apple's Jade	Nichols Canyon	Supasundae
2016
Apple's Jade	Vroum Vroum Mag	Shaneshill
2015
Arctic Fire	Alpha Des Obeaux	Gwencily Berbas
2014
Lieutenant Colonel	Jetson	Little King Robin
2013
Jezki	Zaidpour	Diakali
2012
Zaidpour	Monksland	Voler La Vedette
2011
Voler La Vedette	Mourad	The Real Article

2010-2001
2010
Hurricane Fly	Solwhit	Voler La Vedette
2009
Oscar Dan Dan	Ninetieth Minute	Healys Bar
2008
Catch Me	Brave Inca	Hardy Eustace
2007
Aitmatov	Sweet Kiln	Ebaziyan
2006
Brave Inca	Rosaker	Brogella
2005
Solerina	Golden Cross	Brave Inca
2004
Solerina	Brave Inca	Rule Supreme
2003
Solerina	Florida Coast	Scarthy Lad
2002
Limestone Lad	Scottish Memories	Ned Kelly
2001
Limestone Lad	Liss A Paoraigh	Ned Kelly

2000-1994
2000
Youlneverwalkalone	Moscow Flyer	Dorans Pride
1999
Limestone Lad	Istabraq	Master Beveled
1998
Istabraq	Nomadic	Master Beveled
1997
Istabraq	Cockney Lad	Bolino Star
1996
Large Action	Cockney Lad	Theatreworld
1995
Dorans Pride	Beakstown	Only two finished
1994
Danoli	Dorans Pride	Atours

The Hatton's Grace Hurdle is a Grade 1 National Hunt hurdle race in Ireland which is open to horses aged four years or older. It is run at Fairyhouse over a distance of about 2 miles and 4 furlongs (4,023 metres), and during its running there are twelve hurdles to be jumped. The race is scheduled to take place each year in late November or early December.

The event is named after Hatton's Grace, a three-time winner of the Champion Hurdle trained by Vincent O'Brien. It was established in 1994, and it has held Grade 1 status throughout its history. It is usually staged on the same afternoon as two other top-grade races – the Royal Bond Novice Hurdle and the Drinmore Novice Chase.

== Records ==
Most successful horse (3 wins):

- Limestone Lad – 1999, 2001, 2002
- Solerina – 2003, 2004, 2005
- Apple's Jade - 2016, 2017, 2018
- Honeysuckle - 2019, 2020, 2021
- Teahupoo - 2022, 2023, 2025

Leading jockey (5 wins):

- Jack Kennedy - Apple's Jade (2017, 2018), Teahupoo (2022, 2023, 2025)

Leading trainer (6 wins):

- James Bowe – Limestone Lad (1999, 2001, 2002), Solerina (2003, 2004, 2005)
- Gordon Elliott - Apple's Jade (2016, 2017, 2018), Teahupoo (2022, 2023, 2025)

== Winners ==
Year	Winner	Age	Jockey	Trainer
1994	Danoli	6	Charlie Swan	Tom Foley
1995	Dorans Pride	6	Shane Broderick	Michael Hourigan
1996	Large Action	8	Jamie Osborne	Oliver Sherwood
1997	Istabraq	5	Charlie Swan	Aidan O'Brien
1998	Istabraq	6	Charlie Swan	Aidan O'Brien
1999	Limestone Lad	7	Shane McGovern	James Bowe
2000	Youlneverwalkalone	6	Conor O'Dwyer	Christy Roche
2001	Limestone Lad	9	Paul Carberry	James Bowe
2002	Limestone Lad	10	Barry Geraghty	James Bowe
2003	Solerina	6	Gary Hutchinson	James Bowe
2004	Solerina	7	Gary Hutchinson	James Bowe
2005	Solerina	8	Gary Hutchinson	James Bowe
2006	Brave Inca	8	Tony McCoy	Colm Murphy
2007	Aitmatov	6	Paul Carberry	Noel Meade
2008	Catch Me	6	Andrew McNamara	Edward O'Grady
2009	Oscar Dan Dan	7	Davy Russell	Tom Mullins
2010	Hurricane Fly	6	Paul Townend	Willie Mullins
2011	Voler la Vedette	7	Andrew Lynch	Colm Murphy
2012	Zaidpour	6	Ruby Walsh	Willie Mullins
2013	Jezki	5	Tony McCoy	Jessica Harrington
2014	Lieutenant Colonel	5	Bryan Cooper	Sandra Hughes
2015	Arctic Fire	6	Ruby Walsh	Willie Mullins
2016	Apple's Jade	4	Bryan Cooper	Gordon Elliott
2017	Apple's Jade	5	Jack Kennedy	Gordon Elliott
2018	Apple's Jade	6	Jack Kennedy	Gordon Elliott
2019	Honeysuckle	5	Rachael Blackmore	Henry De Bromhead
2020	Honeysuckle	6	Rachael Blackmore	Henry De Bromhead
2021	Honeysuckle	7	Rachael Blackmore	Henry De Bromhead
2022	Teahupoo	5	Jack Kennedy	Gordon Elliott
2023	Teahupoo	6	Jack Kennedy	Gordon Elliott
2024	Lossiemouth	5	Paul Townend	Willie Mullins
2025	Teahupoo	8	Jack Kennedy	Gordon Elliott

== See also ==
- Horse racing in Ireland
- List of Irish National Hunt races
