= Henry de Bromhead =

Irish racehorse trainer

Henry De Bromhead
- de Bromhead in 2021

Personal information
- Nationality: Irish
- Born: 28 October 1972 (age 54) Knockeen, Ireland
- Occupation: Racehorse Trainer
- Spouse: Heather De Bromhead
- Children: Jack De Bromhead († 2022); Mia De Bromhead; Georgia De Bromhead
- Website: https://www.henrydebromheadracing.com/

Horse racing career
- Sport: Horse racing

Significant horses
- Sizing Europe, Sizing John, Sizing Australia, Sizing Granite, Put The Kettle On, Honeysuckle, Minella Times, Minella Indo, Petit Mouchoir, A Plus Tard, Envoi Allen, Identity Thief, Special Tiara, Balko Des Flos, Some Plan, Notebook, Bob Olinger, Monalee

Henry de Bromhead (born 28 October 1972) is an Irish horse trainer who specialises in training horses for National Hunt racing. He has trained a number of Grade 1 winners including Sizing John and Honeysuckle, and is based at stables in Knockeen, County Waterford

== Career ==
He commenced racehorse training in 2000, having taken over the family stable from his father, Harry. De Bromhead spent time learning to train with Robert and Sally Alner and Sir Mark Prescott, and worked at Coolmore Stud. He won his first Grade One race as a trainer in 2008 when Sizing Europe won the Irish Champion Hurdle and since then has gone on to have success in Ireland and the UK. His major successes include the Grand National in 2021 with his most successful jockey Rachael Blackmore, two Champion Hurdles and two Cheltenham Gold Cups at the Cheltenham Festival in 2021 and 2022, four Queen Mother Champion Chase wins, with Sizing Europe in 2011, Special Tiara in 2017, Put The Kettle On in 2021 and Captain Guiness in 2024. His current stable jockey is Darragh O'Keeffe.

== Personal life ==
Henry de Bromhead is married to Heather de Bromhead. They have three children together: twins Jack and Mia, and their younger sister Georgia. He was educated at Glenstal Abbey School.

On 3 September 2022, de Bromhead's son, Jack, was killed in a racing accident during the Glenbeigh Racing Festival. He was competing in a pony race, when he fell off his horse, and sustained fatal injuries, aged 13. All upcoming races during the festival were cancelled.

== Cheltenham Festival winners (27) ==
- Arkle Challenge Trophy - (2) - Sizing Europe (2010), Put The Kettle On (2020)
- Baring Bingham Novices' Hurdle - (1) - Bob Olinger (2021)
- Centenary Novices' Handicap Chase - (1) - A Plus Tard (2019)
- Champion Hurdle - (2) - Honeysuckle (2021, 2022)
- Cheltenham Gold Cup - (2) - Minella Indo (2021), A Plus Tard (2022)
- David Nicholson Mares' Hurdle - (2) - Honeysuckle (2020, 2023)
- Dawn Run Mares' Novices' Hurdle - (2) - Telmesomethinggirl (2021), Air Of Entitlement (2025)
- Glenfarclas Cross Country Chase - (1) - Sizing Australia (2011)
- Golden Miller Novices' Chase - (1) - Bob Olinger (2022)
- Johnny Henderson Grand Annual Chase - (1) Maskada (2023)
- Queen Mother Champion Chase - (4) - Sizing Europe (2011), Special Tiara (2017), Put The Kettle On (2021), Captain Guinness (2024)
- Ryanair Chase - (3) - Balko des Flos (2018), Envoi Allen (2023), Heart Wood (2026)
- Spa Novices' Hurdle - (1) - Minella Indo (2019)
- Stayers' Hurdle - (1) – Bob Olinger (2025)
- Supreme Novices' Hurdle - (1) - Slade Steel (2024)
- Triumph Hurdle - (1) - Quilixios (2021)
- Martin Pipe Conditional Jockeys' Handicap Hurdle - (1) - Air of Entitlement (2026)

== Major wins ==
(Republic of Ireland) Ireland

- Irish Champion Hurdle - (5) Sizing Europe (2008), Petit Mouchoir (2017), Honeysuckle (2020, 2021, 2022)
- Punchestown Champion Chase - (2) Sizing Europe (2012, 2014)
- Punchestown Champion Hurdle - (2) Honeysuckle (2021, 2022)
- Arkle Novice Chase - (3) An Cathaoir Mor (2010), Some Plan (2017), Notebook (2020)
- Hatton's Grace Hurdle - (3) Honeysuckle (2019, 2020, 2021)
- Racing Post Novice Chase - (2) Sizing Europe (2009), Notebook (2019)
- Paddy's Reward Club Chase - (3) Sizing Europe (2012), A Plus Tard (2019), Envoi Allen (2021)
- Paddy Power Future Champions Novice Hurdle - (1) Sizing John (2014)
- December Festival Hurdle - (1) Petit Mouchoir (2016)
- Savills Chase - (1) A Plus Tard (2020)
- Dr P. J. Moriarty Novice Chase - (1) Monalee (2018)
- Slaney Novice Hurdle - (1) Bob Olinger (2021)
- Ladbrokes Champion Chase - (4) Valseur Lido (2016), Envoi Allen (2022, 2024, 2025)
- Mares Novice Hurdle Championship Final - (1) Honeysuckle (2019)
- Irish Daily Mirror Novice Hurdle - (1) Minella Indo (2019)
- Champion Stayers Hurdle - (1) Bob Olinger (2026)

(United Kingdom) Great Britain

- Betfair Chase - (1) - A Plus Tard (2021)
- Fighting Fifth Hurdle - (1) Identity Thief (2015)
- Tingle Creek Chase - (1) Sizing Europe (2011)
- Maghull Novices' Chase - (3) Special Tiara (2013), Sizing Granite (2015), Ornua (2019)
- Manifesto Novices' Chase - (1) Koktail Divin (2026)
- Liverpool Hurdle - (2) Identity Thief (2018), Hiddenvalley Lake (2025)
- Celebration Chase - (1) Special Tiara (2015)
- Top Novices' Hurdle - (1) Inthepocket (2023)
