= Fiveforthree =

Irish-bred Thoroughbred racehorse

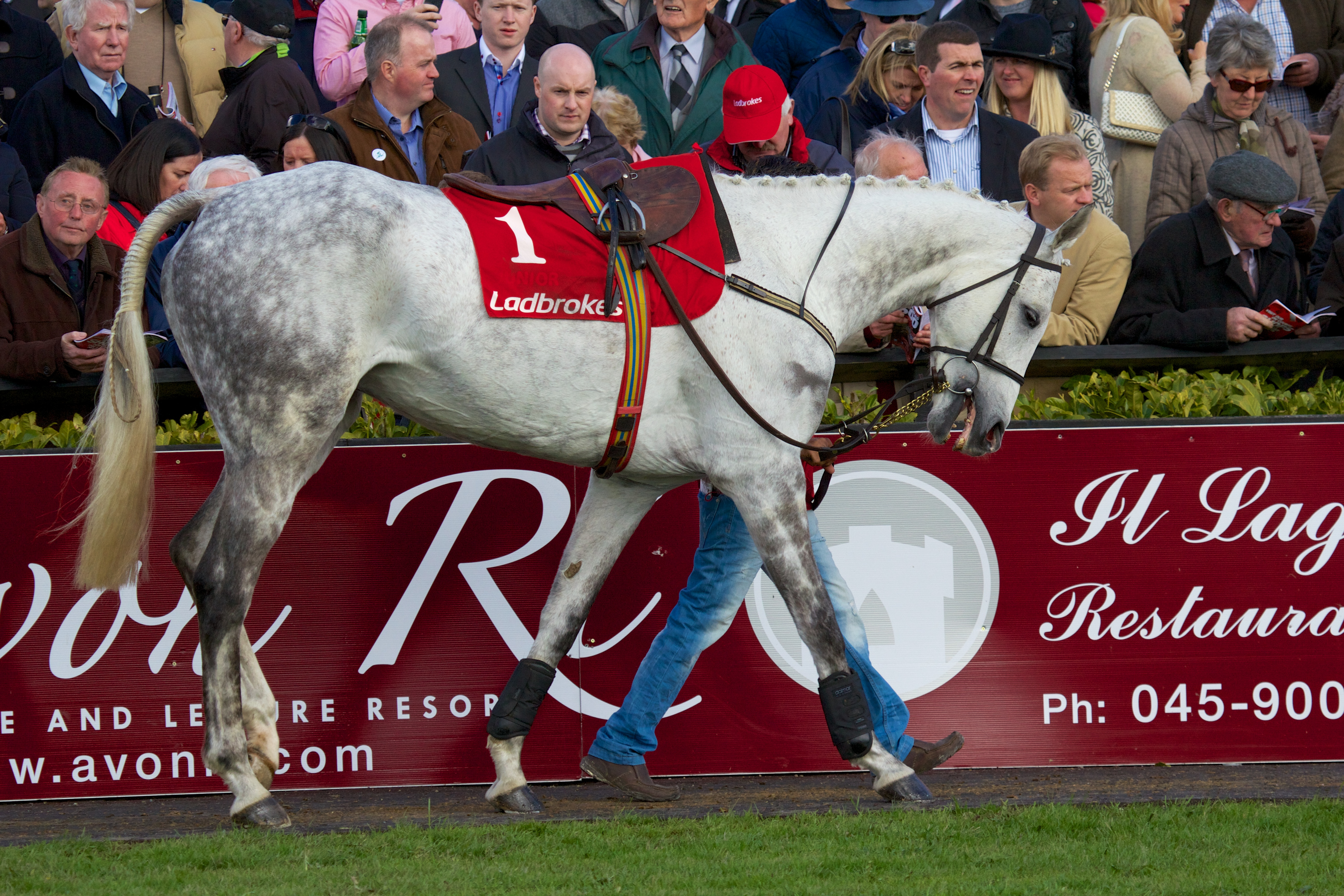
- Fiveforthree at Punchestown in April 2013.
- Sire: Arzanni
- Grandsire: Darshaan
- Dam: What A Queen
- Damsire: King's Ride
- Sex: Gelding
- Foaled: 12 May 2002
- Country: Ireland
- Colour: Grey
- Breeder: Peter and Ann Downes
- Owner: Olde Crowbars Syndicate
- Trainer: Willie Mullins
- Record: 14:6-2-3
- Earnings: £292,659

Major wins
- Ballymore Properties Novices' Hurdle (2008); World Series Hurdle (2009)

Fiveforthree (foaled 12 May 2002) was an Irish Thoroughbred racehorse who competed in National Hunt racing. In a racing career which was frequently interrupted by injury, he won six of his fourteen races between February 2007 and April 2013. After showing promise in National Hunt Flat races in Ireland, he recorded his first major success when winning the Ballymore Properties Novices' Hurdle at the 2008 Cheltenham Festival. In the following season he made only three starts but won the Grade I World Series Hurdle at Punchestown Racecourse. Plans to campaign the horse in steeplechases never came to fruition as training problems restricted him to four races in the next four years.

== Background ==
Fiveforthree is a grey horse bred at the Rusellstown stud near Mullingar in County Westmeath by Peter and Ann Downes. He was sired by Arzanni (1987–2002) who won the Yorkshire Cup and took second place in Ascot Gold Cup for his owner and breeder the Aga Khan in 1991. Apart from Fiveforthree, his best runner was probably Eskleybrook, a successful steeplechaser. Fiveforthree's dam What A Queen had previously produced Celestial Gold, a very successful chaser who won the Paddy Power Gold Cup and the Hennessy Gold Cup in 2004. What A Queen was a descendant of Lady Sunderlin, a half-sister of the Grand National winner Mr What.

As a foal, Fiveforthree was offered for sale at the Tattersalls Ireland sale in November 2002 and was bought for €6,000 by Kevin O'Donnell of Bramblestown Stables, County Kilkenny. Three years later, Fiveforthree, now a three-year-old gelding, was sent to the Doncaster Bloodstock Sale in England but was not sold as he failed to reach his reserve price of 24,000 guineas. He subsequently entered the ownership of the Olde Crowbars Syndicate and was sent into training with Willie Mullins in County Carlow.

== Racing career ==
=== 2006/2007 National Hunt season: National Hunt Flat races ===
Fiveforthree began his racing career in early 2007 by competing in National Hunt Flat races in which he was ridden by Katie Walsh. At Punchestown in February he started 9/4 favourite and went clear in the closing stages to record an "impressive" seven length win. Mullins said he was "very happy, as he's likely to improve a lot from that". Fiveforthree was then moved up in class for the Grade I Champion Bumper at the Cheltenham Festival in March and finished fifth of the twenty-four runners, less than four lengths behind the winner Cork All Star after being denied a clear run two furlongs from the finish. On his final appearance of the season at Fairyhouse in April he started 6/4 favourite but finished third behind Sizing Africa and Mick The Man.

=== 2007/2008 National Hunt season: Novice hurdle races ===
After a ten-month break, (he had injured his ribs when "rolling in the paddock") Fiveforthree returned to compete novice hurdle races, making his first appearance over obstacles at Fairyhouse on 13 February 2008. Ridden by Ruby Walsh he started 8/13 favourite in a field of sixteen runners. He jumped poorly at the last two hurdles but accelerated into the lead near the finish and won "comfortably" by three lengths from Wheels Up. On 14 March, with Ruby Walsh again in the saddle, Fiveforthree was one of fifteen novices to contest the Grade I Ballymore Properties Novices' Hurdle over two and a half miles at the Cheltenham Festival. He was the 7/1 fourth choice in the betting behind the former flat runners Aigle d'Or and Group Captain and the Deloitte Novice Hurdle winner Forpadydeplasterer. Fiveforthree was restrained at the back of the field in the early stages before moving into contention at the third last hurdle. He took the lead at the last and held off the challenge of the Mouse Morris-trained Venalmar to win by a neck.

Fiveforthree ended his second season with two runs at the Punchestown Festival. On 22 April he was brought back in distance for the vcbet.com Champion Novice Hurdle over two miles. He led the field until the second last hurdle, but was outpaced in the closing stages and beaten into third place by Jered and Salford City. Three days later he reappeared in the Land Rover Champion Novice Hurdle over two and a half miles. Starting the 3/1 second favourite, he was towards the rear in the early stages before moving into contention at the last and finished second, two lengths behind Tranquil Sea.

=== 2008/2009 National Hunt season ===
After another long break, Fiveforthree returned in a two-mile hurdle at Wexford Racecourse on 17 March 2009 and won by seven lengths at odds of 4/9. He visited England for the third time on 4 April when he contested the Grade I Aintree Hurdle over two and a half miles at the Grand National meeting. With Ruby Walsh riding the Paul Nicholls-trained Celestial Halo, Fiveforthree was ridden by Paul Townend and started at odds of 7/1 in a field which included Al Eile, Katchit, Hardy Eustace, Solwhit and Jered. He took the lead approaching the final hurdle but was caught 75 yards from the line and beaten half a length by Solwhit. Fiveforthree was reunited with Ruby Walsh in the three mile World Series Hurdle at Punchestown on 30 April. Before the race, Mullins said of the grey "he is bred to get the trip... [and] is in very good form". Walsh held up the 5/4 favourite at the back of the field before making steady progress to challenge for the lead at the last. He drew away from his rivals on the run-in and won by seven lengths from Pettifour. After the race Walsh said; "he is a really high class horse and won well – he proved today that he can stay. He got very warm and he has jumped better in the past but he has a great engine". Mullins indicated that the horse would almost certainly be campaigned in steeplechases in future, saying "he was bred to be a chaser but I didn't think he was going to be big enough to be a chaser. He will go chasing next year as I don't see any point in staying over hurdles".

=== 2010/2011 National Hunt season ===
Fiveforthree sustained an injury at the end of the season 2008/2009 season and failed to improve when returning to Mullins stable in autumn. In November Mullins announced that the gelding would miss the next season saying "we just decided not to go any further. We were hoping he would make it back for the second half of the season. Every other year he seems to come back, but he just hasn't taken his training well. There is no further damage or injury. We have just decided it would be prudent not to continue".

Fiveforthree did not race again until 16 February 2011 at Punchestown. Ridden by Townend, he started 4/7 favourite for a two-mile hurdle and won easily by four lengths from the veteran steeplechaser Newmill. He was sent to Cheltenham in March for the World Hurdle but made little impact and finished eighth behind Big Buck's.

=== 2012/2013 National Hunt season ===
Fiveforthree was off the racecourse for two years before returning for the Coral Cup, a handicap hurdle over two miles five furlongs at the 2013 Cheltenham Festival. Carrying a weight of 165 pounds, he started a 20/1 outsider but finished a close third behind Medinas and Meister Eckhart. In April he attempted to repeat his 2009 success in the World Series Hurdle at Punchestown but finished fifth of the six runners behind the mare Quevega.

== Pedigree ==
Pedigree of Fiveforthree (IRE), grey gelding, 2002
Sire Arzanni (IRE) 1987	Darshaan (GB); 1981	Shirley Heights	Mill Reef
Sire Arzanni (IRE) 1987	Darshaan (GB); 1981	Shirley Heights	Hardiemma
Sire Arzanni (IRE) 1987	Darshaan (GB); 1981	Delsy	Abdos
Sire Arzanni (IRE) 1987	Darshaan (GB); 1981	Delsy	Kelty
Sire Arzanni (IRE) 1987	Astara (IRE); 1980	Nishapour	Zeddaan
Sire Arzanni (IRE) 1987	Astara (IRE); 1980	Nishapour	Alama
Sire Arzanni (IRE) 1987	Astara (IRE); 1980	Astana	Arbar
Sire Arzanni (IRE) 1987	Astara (IRE); 1980	Astana	Theano
Dam What A Queen (IRE) 1984	King's Ride (IRE); 1976	Rarity	Hethersett
Dam What A Queen (IRE) 1984	King's Ride (IRE); 1976	Rarity	Who Can Tell
Dam What A Queen (IRE) 1984	King's Ride (IRE); 1976	Ride	Sovereign Path
Dam What A Queen (IRE) 1984	King's Ride (IRE); 1976	Ride	Turf
Dam What A Queen (IRE) 1984	What A Honey (GB); 1962	Vulgan	Sirlan
Dam What A Queen (IRE) 1984	What A Honey (GB); 1962	Vulgan	Vulgate
Dam What A Queen (IRE) 1984	What A Honey (GB); 1962	What A Daisy	Grand Inquisitor
Dam What A Queen (IRE) 1984	What A Honey (GB); 1962	What A Daisy	Lady Sunderlin (Family: 3-i)
