= Back in Front =

Irish-bred Thoroughbred racehorse

Back In Front
- Sire: Bob Back
- Grandsire: Roberto
- Dam: Storm Front
- Damsire: Strong Gale
- Sex: Gelding
- Foaled: 14 April 1997
- Country: Ireland
- Colour: Brown
- Breeder: Noreen Hayes
- Owner: Dermot Cox & Nelius Hayes
- Trainer: Edward O'Grady
- Record: 25:11-5-1
- Earnings: £260,148

Major wins
- Supreme Novices' Hurdle (2003); Evening Herald Champion Novice Hurdle (2003); Morgiana Hurdle (2003); Bula Hurdle (2004)

Back In Front (foaled 14 April 1997) is a retired, Irish Thoroughbred racehorse who competed in National Hunt racing. The gelding showed early promise in National Hunt Flat races, winning twice and finishing third in an exceptionally strong renewal of the Champion Bumper. He was one of the leading novice hurdlers in the 2003–04 season, winning four races including the Supreme Novices' Hurdle in England and the Evening Herald Champion Novice Hurdle in Ireland. In the following season he won the Morgiana Hurdle and was regarded as a Champion Hurdle contender before being sidelined by injury. Back In Front won the Bula Hurdle in 2004 but ran poorly when joint-favourite for the Champion Hurdle in 2005. He had little success when switched to steeplechasing and was retired in 2007, having won eleven of his twenty-five races.

== Background ==
Back In Front was a brown gelding with a small white star bred in County Limerick Ireland by Noreen Hayes. He was sired by Bob Back, a racehorse whose best performance came when he recorded an upset win over Pebbles and Commanche Run in the 1985 Prince of Wales's Stakes. As a breeding stallion, he sired the St Leger Stakes winner Bob's Return, but had more success as a National Hunt sire, with his progeny including Bobs Worth, Bacchanal (Stayers' Hurdle), Thisthatandtother (Festival Trophy) and Burton Port (Reynoldstown Novices' Chase). Back In Front's dam Storm Front showed some ability as a National Hunt racehorse, winning six minor races and being placed at Grade III level. She was a descendant of the broodmare Drift who produced the classic winners Tide-Way and Sun Stream.

In June 2000, the three-year-old gelding was sent by the Hayes' family's Knockainey stud to the Tattersalls Ireland sale, but was withdrawn. During his racing career, he was owned in partnership by Nelius Hayes and Dermot Cox and was trained by Edward O'Grady at Ballynonty, County Tipperary. Back In Front was a temperamental and headstrong horse who was sometimes difficult to manage. In 2005 O'Grady said of the gelding: "He's like Mr. T in The A-Team. They had to knock him out to get him on the plane. Well, if we want so much as to clip Back In Front, we have to knock him out. If we don't, he's the boss, he won't allow us. In previous years we've done that. This year, we just thought: OK, leave him hairy. When he first arrived with us he wasn't terribly keen to have anything done with his head. Like putting a bridle on it. We've learnt. If we want to do something that doesn't suit him, we say, That's fine. We'll come back later."

== Racing career ==
=== 2001/2002 National Hunt season: National Hunt Flat races ===
Back In Front began his racing career competing in National Hunt Flat races, also known as "bumpers". He started 7/2 favourite for his debut at Naas Racecourse in July 2001 and won by five lengths from twenty opponents, despite being eased down in the closing stages. In November he was sent to England for a bumper at Cheltenham Racecourse in which he was ridden by Norman Williamson. Starting the 100/30 second favourite in a fifteen-runner field he won by a short head from the mare Wild Dream, with the pair finishing eighteen lengths clear of the other runners. The gelding returned to Cheltenham in March and was moved up in class for the Grade I Champion Bumper in which he was ridden by Charlie Swan. He briefly took the lead inside the last quarter mile before finishing third to Pizarro and Rhinestone Cowboy with Thisthatandtother in fourth and Iris's Gift fifth of the twenty-three runners. O'Grady later said of the race; "It must have been one of the most competitive bumpers that's ever been run". On his final appearance of the season, he ran very poorly in the Champion INH Flat Race at Punchestown Racecourse in April, finishing tailed off in last place.

=== 2002/2003 National Hunt season: Novice Hurdles ===
In the 2002/2003 National Hunt, Back In Front competed mainly in novice hurdle races. On his debut over obstacles he was ridden by Williamson in the Grade I Royal Bond Novice Hurdle at Fairyhouse Racecourse on 1 December. Racing for the first time in over seven months, he took the lead two hurdles from the finish but was caught in the closing stages and beaten one and a half lengths by Hardy Eustace, a horse who went on to win two Champion Hurdles. The gelding was dropped in class for a maiden hurdle at Leopardstown Racecourse in January and won by three quarters of a length from the Willie Mullins-trained Arch Stanton, to whom he was conceding four pounds. On 19 February Back In Front started 4/11 favourite against nine opponents in a novice hurdle at Limerick Racecourse. Williamson tracked the leaders before moving to the front approaching the second last flight. Back In Front accelerated clear of the field in "impressive" style and won by fourteen lengths from the four-year-old Hidden Genius.

Back In Front made his second visit to the Cheltenham Festival in 2003 when he was one of nineteen runners for the Grade I Supreme Novices' Hurdle on 11 March. Ridden by Williamson, he started the 3/1 favourite, with his main rivals in the betting being Thisthatandtother (9/2) and Kicking King (13/2). He raced behind the leaders and jumped "with great fluency" before moving up to second place three hurdles from the finish and taking the lead after the next obstacle. In the straight he quickened away from his opponents to win impressively by ten lengths from Kicking King, who was in turn four lengths clear of Chauvinist in third. The win for the Irish-trained favourite in the opening race of the meeting was enthusiastically received by the huge crowd, and security staff were unable to prevent the horse being surrounded by celebrating supporters as he returned to the winner's enclosure. O'Grady, who had trained the ill-fated Golden Cygnet to win the race twenty-five years earlier commented "I'll be disappointed if he's not in Race Three next year". On 29 April at the Punchestown Festival Back In Front started 4/11 favourite for the Grade I Evening Herald Champion Novice Hurdle. He took the lead approaching the last hurdle and stayed on to win "comfortably" by two and a half lengths from the British-trained Limerick Boy. Three days later, over the same course and distance, the gelding was matched against more experienced rivals in the Punchestown Champion Hurdle and was made the 8/11 favourite. He took the lead at the final hurdle but was overtaken in the closing stages and beaten a length by the Jonjo O'Neill-trained Quazar.

=== 2003/2004 National Hunt season ===
Back In Front's first run of the 2003/2004 season came in the Grade I John James McManus Memorial Hurdle over two miles at Tipperary Racecourse on 5 October. He was in second place throughout the race, proving no match for the British-trained Intersky Falcon who won by twelve lengths. Barry Geraghty took over from Williamson for the gelding's next race, the Grade II Morgiana Hurdle at Punchestown on 16 November. Starting the 4/5 favourite, he looked beaten early in the straight, but stayed on strongly to take the lead after the last hurdle and won by one and a half lengths from Sacundai and Solerina. After the race, O'Grady said "I thought he was beaten turning in but he showed plenty of resolution and fought well to win". In December, he started 5/2 second favourite for the December Festival Hurdle at Leopardstown but finished fifth of the seven runners behind the 66/1 outsider Golden Cross. In February, after a poor performance in training, he was found to have an irregular heartbeat, and then sustained a leg injury which ruled him out for the rest of the season.

=== 2004/2005 National Hunt season ===
After a break of almost ten months, Back In Front returned in a flat race at Navan in October 2004. Ridden by the leading flat jockey Jamie Spencer, he went clear off his rivals in the final furlong and won by three and a half lengths from the three-year-old filly Akilana. In the Morgiana Hurdle in November, he finished second to Harchibald, with the odds-on favourite Macs Joy in third. Back In Front was sent to England in the following month when he faced the leading British hurdlers Rooster Booster and Inglis Drever in the Bula Hurdle at Cheltenham. Ridden by Davy Russell, he was restrained at the back of the field before making progress approaching the second last flight. He overtook Rooster Booster before the last hurdle and won by four lengths from Inglis Drever. O'Grady commented "I didn't think he was going to win coming down the hill or that he would come home as well as he did – I'd forgotten how good he is". At the 2005 Cheltenham Festival Back In Front started 7/2 joint-favourite with Hardy Eustace for the Champion Hurdle, in a strong field which also included Macs Joy, Harchibald, Brave Inca, Intersky Falcon, Al Eile and Rooster Booster. Ruby Walsh was given the ride on the gelding, a decision which left Davy Russell "disgusted". Back In Front was among the early leaders, but weakened from the second last, finishing ninth of the fourteen runners.

=== Later career ===
Back In Front began the following season in hurdle races, finishing second to Solerina in the Lismullen Hurdle and a distant fourth behind the same mare in the Hatton's Grace Hurdle at Fairyhouse in December. He was then switched to steeplechasing, making his debut over larger obstacles at Limerick on 26 December. He survived an early mistake to take the lead approaching the last fence, where his closest pursuer fell, and won by more than thirty lengths. At the 2006 Cheltenham Festival Back In Front, running for the second time over fences, started at odds of 11/1 for the Grade I Royal & SunAlliance Chase. He was in second place behind Star de Mohaison when he made a bad mistake at the penultimate fence and unseated his jockey, Patrick Flood. On his only other start of the season he finished fifth of the six runners when favourite for the Ellier Developments Novice Chase at Punchestown in April after making several jumping errors.

In November 2006, Back In Front started odds-on favourite for a chase at Clonmel Racecourse but fell five fences from the finish. Later that month he won a three-mile chase at Thurles, beating Romek by six lengths. On his final appearance, he started a 28/1 outsider for the Grade I Lexus Chase at Leopardstown in December. He was in touch with the leaders until the third fence from the finish, but then dropped back quickly and finished tailed off last of the six runners.

== Pedigree ==
Pedigree of Back In Front (IRE), brown gelding, 1997
Sire Bob Back (USA) 1981	Roberto (USA); 1969	Hail to Reason	Turn-To
Sire Bob Back (USA) 1981	Roberto (USA); 1969	Hail to Reason	Nothirdchance
Sire Bob Back (USA) 1981	Roberto (USA); 1969	Bramalea	Nashua
Sire Bob Back (USA) 1981	Roberto (USA); 1969	Bramalea	Rarelea
Sire Bob Back (USA) 1981	Toter Back (USA); 1967	Carry Back	Saggy
Sire Bob Back (USA) 1981	Toter Back (USA); 1967	Carry Back	Joppy
Sire Bob Back (USA) 1981	Toter Back (USA); 1967	Romantic Miss	Beauchef
Sire Bob Back (USA) 1981	Toter Back (USA); 1967	Romantic Miss	Roman Zephyr
Dam Storm Front (IRE) 1988	Strong Gale (IRE); 1975	Lord Gayle	Sir Gaylord
Dam Storm Front (IRE) 1988	Strong Gale (IRE); 1975	Lord Gayle	Sticky Case
Dam Storm Front (IRE) 1988	Strong Gale (IRE); 1975	Sterntau	Tamerlane
Dam Storm Front (IRE) 1988	Strong Gale (IRE); 1975	Sterntau	Sterna
Dam Storm Front (IRE) 1988	Tuneful (GB); 1971	Reliance	Tantieme
Dam Storm Front (IRE) 1988	Tuneful (GB); 1971	Reliance	Relance
Dam Storm Front (IRE) 1988	Tuneful (GB); 1971	Song of the Coral	Tudor Minstrel
Dam Storm Front (IRE) 1988	Tuneful (GB); 1971	Song of the Coral	Coral Reef (Family:8-g)
