= Like-A-Butterfly =

Irish-bred Thoroughbred racehorse

- Sire: Montelimar
- Grandsire: Alleged
- Dam: Swifts Butterfly
- Damsire: Furry Glen
- Sex: Mare
- Foaled: 19 April 1994
- Country: Ireland
- Colour: Bay
- Breeder: P J McGee
- Owner: J P McManus
- Trainer: Christy Roche
- Record: 17:12-0-2
- Earnings: £320,817

Major wins
- Champion INH Flat Race (2001); Royal Bond Novice Hurdle (2001); Deloitte Novice Hurdle (2002); Supreme Novices' Hurdle (2002); Irish Champion Hurdle (2003); Powers Gold Cup (2005); Mildmay Novices' Chase (2005)

Like-A-Butterfly (19 April 1994 – 7 February 2013) was an Irish Thoroughbred racehorse and broodmare who competed in National Hunt racing. Although she did not begin competing in public until she was seven years old she had a successful racing career, winning twelve of her seventeen races, including five at Grade I level. She was unbeaten in three National Hunt Flat races including the Champion INH Flat Race and her first five over hurdles including the Royal Bond Novice Hurdle, Deloitte Novice Hurdle and Supreme Novices' Hurdle. She won the Irish Champion Hurdle but missed the whole of the next season through injury. In her final season she competed in steeplechases and won three times including the Powers Gold Cup and the Mildmay Novices' Chase. After retiring from racing she produced five foals before dying of horse colic at the age of nineteen.

== Background ==
Like-A-Butterfly was a bay mare with no white markings bred in Ireland by P. J. McGee. he was sired by Montelimar, a lightly-campaigned son of Alleged who won the Gallinule Stakes in 1984 and became a very successful National Hunt stallion: his other progeny included the Grand National winners Hedgehunter and Monty's Pass. Her dam, Swifts Butterfly, was a poor racehorse who never finished better than third in thirteen attempts in 1990 and 1991.

During her racing career, Like-A-Butterfly was owned by J. P. McManus and trained by the former flat race jockey Christy Roche at Coolaghknock Glebe, County Kildare.

== Racing career ==
=== 2000/2001 National Hunt season: National Hunt Flat races ===
Like-A-Butterfly did not race until the age of seven, when she began competing in National Hunt Flat races, also known as "Bumpers". On 7 January at Naas Racecourse she started even money favourite against twenty opponents in a two-mile event and won easily by eleven lengths from twenty opponents. Two weeks later at Leopardstown Racecourse moved up in distance to two and a quarter miles and started 4/9 favourite in a field of eight. Ridden as on her debut by Alan Crowe, she took the lead three furlongs from the finish and drew away to win by fifteen lengths.

On 27 April, the mare was moved up in class for the Grade I paddypower.com Champion INH Flat Race in which she was ridden by the leading amateur jockey J T McNamara, Crowe being forced to miss the ride after sustaining a broken collar bone. Like A Butterfly started 11/8 favourite ahead of the previously unbeaten geldings Native Jack and Davenport Milenium. She was restrained by McNamara in the early stages before moving up to take the lead a furlong and a half from the finish and kept on well in the closing stages to win by one and a half lengths and three lengths from Davenport Milenium and the mare Spirit Leader.

=== 2001/2002 National Hunt season: Novice Hurdles ===
In the 2001/2002 season, Like-A-Butterfly competed in Novice hurdle races, beginning at Navan Racecourse in November. Ridden by Charlie Swan and starting the 4/7 favourite, she won by eight lengths from Rule Supreme, a gelding who went on to win the Hennessy Gold Cup in 2005. Swan partnered the mare again when she started 4/7 favourite for the Grade I Royal Bond Hurdle at Fairyhouse on 2 December. She took the lead three hurdles from the finish, went clear of her opponents, and won by four lengths from Sacundai, despite being eased down by Swan near the finish. At the end of the month she won again at Leopardstown, but had her closest race up to that time, prevailing by half a length from the five-year-old Pietro Vannucci.

Like-A-Butterfly prepared for her first Cheltenham Festival with a run in the Grade II Deloitte and Touche Novice hurdle at Leopardstown on 10 February. She took the lead at the sixth hurdle and drew clear of her rivals in the closing stages to win by five lengths, with the unplaced runners including Beef Or Salmon. On 12 March at Cheltenham Racecourse, the unbeaten mare started 7/4 favourite against twenty-seven opponents for the Grade I Gerrard Supreme Novices' Hurdle, with her main rival appearing to be the former flat racer Westender. Like-A-Butterfly led briefly in the early stages and then tracked Westender before regaining the lead two hurdles from the finish. She was overtaken by the Willie Mullins-trained Adamant Approach, but when that horse fell at the last she regained the lead and held off the renewed challenge of Westender to win by a neck.

Like-A-Butterfly was unbeaten in eight races when he started favourite for the Grade I Menolly Homes Champion Novice Hurdle at Punchestown Racecourse on 24 April. She took the lead after the second last hurdle, but was soon overtaken and sustained her first defeat, finishing third behind Davenport Milenium and Thari.

=== 2002/2003 National Hunt season: Hurdles ===
Like-A-Butterfly made her debut in open competition when she was matched against the multiple Grade I winning gelding Limestone Lad in the Irish Champion Hurdle at Leopardstown on 26 January 2003. Swan tracked Limestone Lad for most of the race before taking the lead at the last hurdle. The gelding rallied strongly in the closing stages, but Like-A-Butterfly held on under pressure to win by a head. After the race, Swan commented "The mare is very quick and dug deep for me" and said that she "would have a big chance of taking the title". On 11 March at Cheltenham, the mare started 13/2 fourth choice in the betting for the Champion Hurdle behind Rhinestone Cowboy, Rooster Booster and Intersky Falcon. She was among the early leaders, but struggled in the second half of the race and eventually finished tenth behind Rooster Booster. On her final start of the season a month later she finished third behind Sacundai and Rooster Booster in the Aintree Hurdle.

=== 2004/2005 National Hunt season: Steeplechases ===
After missing the whole of the 2003/2004 season with a tendon injury, Like-A-Butterfly returned to compete in steeplechases in the following season. In her first appearance in more than nineteen months, she was ridden by Conor O'Dwyer and was an impressive four-length winner of a novice chase at Naas on 20 November. The mare started favourite for the Grade I Durkan New Homes Novice Chase at Leopardstown on 26 December, but dropped out of contention five fences from the finish and failed to complete the course for the only time in her career as O'Dwyer pulled her up before the second last. The mare was moved up to three miles for the Royal & SunAlliance Chase at the Cheltenham Festival in which she was ridden by A. P. McCoy. She moved up to challenge the leaders three fences from the finish but weakened from the last and finished fifth of the six finishers behind Trabolgan.

On 29 March at Fairyhouse the mare dropped back in distance for the Grade I Powers Gold Cup over two and a half miles and started 7/2 favourite in a field of thirteen which included Davenport Milenium. Ridden by McCoy, she tracked the leader before challenging for the lead at the final fence and won by half a length from Forget The Past. Like-A-Butterfly's final appearance came at Aintree Racecourse on 8 April, when she started 6/1 third favourite for the Mildmay Novices' Chase over three miles and one furlong. McCoy restrained the mare in the early stages before moving up to take the lead approaching the last fence and winning by one and three quarter lengths from See You Sometime and the favourite L'Ami.

== Breeding record ==
Like-A-Butterfly was retired from racing to become a broodmare for J. P. McManus's stud. She produced five foals:

- Speckled Wood (bay filly, foaled 2008, sired by High Chaparral), winner of three races
- All For Luck (bay filly, 2010, by High Chaparral), unraced
- Unnamed filly, 2011, by Yeats
- Unnamed colt, 2012, by Yeats
- Unnamed colt, 2013, by Yeats

Like-A-Butterfly died in February 2013 after contracting colic following the birth of her last foal. Roche said "I've never trained one better than her. She was a bit special".

== Pedigree ==
Pedigree of Like-A-Butterfly (IRE), bay mare, 1994
Sire Montelimar (USA) 1981	Alleged (USA); 1974	Hoist the Flag	Tom Rolfe
Sire Montelimar (USA) 1981	Alleged (USA); 1974	Hoist the Flag	Wavy Navy
Sire Montelimar (USA) 1981	Alleged (USA); 1974	Princess Pout	Prince John
Sire Montelimar (USA) 1981	Alleged (USA); 1974	Princess Pout	Determined Lady
Sire Montelimar (USA) 1981	L'Extravagante (CAN); 1973	Le Fabuleux	Wild Risk
Sire Montelimar (USA) 1981	L'Extravagante (CAN); 1973	Le Fabuleux	Anguar
Sire Montelimar (USA) 1981	L'Extravagante (CAN); 1973	Fanfreluche	Northern Dancer
Sire Montelimar (USA) 1981	L'Extravagante (CAN); 1973	Fanfreluche	Ciboulette
Dam Swifts Butterfly (GB) 1985	Furry Glen (IRE); 1971	Wolver Hollow	Sovereign Path
Dam Swifts Butterfly (GB) 1985	Furry Glen (IRE); 1971	Wolver Hollow	Cygnet
Dam Swifts Butterfly (GB) 1985	Furry Glen (IRE); 1971	Cleftess	Hill Gail
Dam Swifts Butterfly (GB) 1985	Furry Glen (IRE); 1971	Cleftess	Cleft
Dam Swifts Butterfly (GB) 1985	Baloney (GB); 1974	Balidar	Will Somers
Dam Swifts Butterfly (GB) 1985	Baloney (GB); 1974	Balidar	Violet Bank
Dam Swifts Butterfly (GB) 1985	Baloney (GB); 1974	Bay Pearl	Immortality
Dam Swifts Butterfly (GB) 1985	Baloney (GB); 1974	Bay Pearl	Gold Town (Family: 23)
