= Klassical Dream =

French-bred Thoroughbred racehorse

- Sire: Dream Well
- Dam: Klassical Way
- Damsire: Septieme Ciel
- Sex: Gelding
- Foaled: 30 March 2014
- Country: France
- Colour: Bay
- Breeder: Hubert Honore & Mrs Laure Guillaume
- Owner: Mrs Joanne Coleman
- Trainer: Willie Mullins
- Record: 16:7,2,2
- Earnings: £435,388

Major wins
- Chanelle Pharma Novice Hurdle (2019); Supreme Novices' Hurdle (2019); Champion Novice Hurdle (2019); Champion Stayers Hurdle (2021, 2022, 2023); Christmas Hurdle (2021)

Klassical Dream (foaled 30 March 2014) is a French thoroughbred racehorse competing in National Hunt racing.

== Career ==
Bred in France, Klassical Dream started his career hurdling for owners Ecurie Zingaro. Following seven runs, primarily at Auteuil, Klassical Dream had picked up just one victory inn the Prix de Gastines at Sablé-sur-Sarthe.

He was sold in 2018 and training switched to Willie Mullins in Ireland. His first race for new owner Mrs Joanne Coleman came at Leopardstown and ended with victory. Klassical Dream would go on to win three Grade 1 races in a row in 2019 under Ruby Walsh the Chanelle Pharma Novice Hurdle, the Supreme Novices Hurdle at Cheltenham and the Champion Novice Hurdle at Punchestown a month later.

Two defeats would follow in Ireland, including a third place in the Morgiana Hurdle under Paul Townend. Klassical Dream went on to win two Grade 1 races in 2021, the Champion Stayers Hurdle at Punchestown under Patrick Mullins, and later the Christmas Hurdle at Leopardstown, again under Townend.
