= Tattersalls Ireland Novice Hurdle =

Hurdle horse race in Ireland

Channelle Pharma Novice Hurdle
2026
Talk The Talk	Ballyfad	King Rasko Grey

Previous years
2025
Kopek Des Bordes	Karniquet	Good And Clever
2024
Ballyburn	Slade Steel	King Of Kingsfield
2023
Il Etait Temps	Inthepocket	Dark Raven
2022
Sir Gerhard	Three Stripe Life	Colonel Mustard
2021
Appreciate It	Ballyadam	Blue Lord

2020-2011
2020
Asterion Forlonge	Easywork	Mt Leinster
2019
Klassical Dream	Aramon	Vision D'Honneur
2018
Samcro	Duc Des Genievres	Paloma Blue
2017
Bacardys	Bunk Off Early	Brelade
2016
Bleu Et Rouge	Tombstone	Bellshill
2015
Nichols Canyon	Windsor Park	Alvisio Ville
2014
Vautour	The Tullow Tank	King of The Picts
2013
Champagne Fever	Bright New Dawn	Wingtips
2012
Benefficient	Sous Les Cieux	Il Fenomeno
2011
Oscars Well	Zaidpour	Shot From The Hip

2010-2001
2010
Dunguib	Fionnegas	Some Present
2009
Pandorama	Western Charmer	Zarinava
2008
Forpadydeplasterer	Cork All Star	Tranquil Sea
2007
Aran Concerto	Leading Run	Arrive Sir Clive
2006
Mr Nosie	Royaldou	Schindlers Hunt
2005
Royal Paradise	The Railway Man	Augherskea
2004
Brave Inca	Newmill	Mariah Rollins
2003
Solerina	Hardy Eustace	Nil Desperandum
2002
Like-A-Butterfly	Sacundai	Adamant Approach
2001
Colonel Braxton	Liss A Paoraigh	Risk Accessor

2000-1997
2000
Youlneverwalkalone	Sackville	Well Ridden
1999
Alexander Banquet	Native Upmanship	Winter Garden
1998
Native Estates	Promalee	Ballygowan Beauty
1997
Istabraq	Finnegan's Hollow I	Palette

The Tattersalls Ireland Novice Hurdle is a Grade 1 National Hunt hurdle race in Ireland which is open to horses aged five years or older. It is run at Leopardstown over a distance of about 2 miles (3,219 metres), and during its running there are nine hurdles to be jumped. The race is for novice hurdlers, and it is scheduled to take place each year in February.

The race was established in 1987, and during its early years it was sponsored by Paddy Power and Le Coq Hardi. Deloitte, supported the event from 1992 to 2017. The race continued as the Deloitte and Touche Novice Hurdle until 2003, and was known as the Deloitte Novice Hurdle from 2004 to 2018. From 2019 to 2021 the race was sponsored by the Chanelle Pharmaceutical Group and since 2022 it has been sponsored by Tattersalls. Prior to 2018 it was run over a distance of 2 miles and 2 furlongs.

Winners of the Tattersalls Ireland Novice Hurdle usually go on to compete in either the Supreme Novices' Hurdle or the Gallagher Novices' Hurdle. Those to have also achieved victory in one of those races are Danoli, Istabraq, Like-A-Butterfly, Brave Inca, Champagne Fever, Vautour, Samcro, Appreciate It, Ballyburn and Kopek Des Bordes.

== Records ==
Leading jockey (6 wins):

- Paul Carberry – Bolino Star (1996), Native Estates (1998), Solerina (2003), Mr Nosie (2006), Aran Concerto (2007), Pandorama (2009)

Leading trainer (13 wins):

- Willie Mullins - Alexander Banquet (1999), Champagne Fever (2013), Vautour (2014), Nichols Canyon (2015), Bleu Et Rouge (2016), Bacardys (2017), Klassical Dream (2019), Asterion Forlonge (2020), Appreciate It (2021), Sir Gerhard (2022), Il Etait Temps (2023), Ballyburn (2024), Kopek Des Bordes (2025)

== Winners ==
Year	Winner	Age	Jockey	Trainer
1987	Midsummer Gamble	6	Mark Dwyer	Dermot Weld
1988	Carvill's Hill	6	Ken Morgan	Jim Dreaper
1989	Naevog	6	Martin Browne	Liam Browne
1990	Scally Owen	6	Tony Mullins	Paddy Mullins
1991	General Idea	6	Brendan Sheridan	Dermot Weld
1992	Flashing Steel	7	Kevin O'Brien	John Mulhern
1993	Boro Eight	7	Adrian Maguire	Paddy Mullins
1994	Danoli	6	Charlie Swan	Tom Foley
1995	Hotel Minella	8	Graham Bradley	Aidan O'Brien
1996	Bolino Star	5	Paul Carberry	Sean Treacy
1997	Istabraq	5	Charlie Swan	Aidan O'Brien
1998	Native Estates	6	Paul Carberry	Noel Meade
1999	Alexander Banquet	6	Ruby Walsh	Willie Mullins
2000	Youlneverwalkalone	6	Conor O'Dwyer	Christy Roche
2001	Colonel Braxton	6	Kieran Kelly	Dessie Hughes
2002	Like-A-Butterfly	8	Charlie Swan	Christy Roche
2003	Solerina	6	Paul Carberry	James Bowe
2004	Brave Inca	6	Barry Cash	Colm Murphy
2005	Royal Paradise	5	Mick Fitzgerald	Tom Foley
2006	Mr Nosie	5	Paul Carberry	Noel Meade
2007	Aran Concerto	6	Paul Carberry	Noel Meade
2008	Forpadydeplasterer	6	Davy Russell	Tom Cooper
2009	Pandorama	6	Paul Carberry	Noel Meade
2010	Dunguib	7	Brian O'Connell	Philip Fenton
2011	Oscars Well	6	Robbie Power	Jessica Harrington
2012	Benefficient	6	Bryan Cooper	Tony Martin
2013	Champagne Fever	6	Paul Townend	Willie Mullins
2014	Vautour	5	Ruby Walsh	Willie Mullins
2015	Nichols Canyon	5	Ruby Walsh	Willie Mullins
2016	Bleu Et Rouge	5	Barry Geraghty	Willie Mullins
2017	Bacardys	6	Patrick Mullins (Note: amateur jockey)	Willie Mullins
2018	Samcro	6	Jack Kennedy	Gordon Elliott
2019	Klassical Dream	5	Ruby Walsh	Willie Mullins
2020	Asterion Forlonge	6	Danny Mullins	Willie Mullins
2021	Appreciate It	7	Paul Townend	Willie Mullins
2022	Sir Gerhard	7	Paul Townend	Willie Mullins
2023	Il Etait Temps	5	Danny Mullins	Willie Mullins
2024	Ballyburn	6	Paul Townend	Willie Mullins
2025	Kopek Des Bordes	5	Paul Townend	Willie Mullins
2026	Talk The Talk	5	JJ Slevin	Joseph O'Brien

== See also ==
- Horse racing in Ireland
- List of Irish National Hunt races
