= Douvan =

National Hunt racehorse trained in Ireland

- Racing silks of F-X Chaussonniere and Susannah Ricci
- Sire: Walk in the Park
- Grandsire: Montjeu
- Dam: Star Face
- Damsire: Saint de Saints
- Sex: Gelding
- Foaled: 9 May 2010
- Country: France
- Colour: Bay
- Breeder: Haras De La Faisanderie
- Owner: François-Xavier Chaussonnière; Susannah Ricci
- Trainer: Philippe Peltier; Willie Mullins
- Record: 19: 14-2-0
- Earnings: £609,835

Major wins
- Moscow Flyer Novice Hurdle (2015); Supreme Novices' Hurdle (2015); Herald Champion Novice Hurdle; Racing Post Novice Chase (2015); Arkle Novice Chase (2016); Arkle Challenge Trophy (2016); Maghull Novices' Chase (2016); Ryanair Novice Chase (2016); Hilly Way Chase (2016); Paddy Power Cashcard Chase (2016); Tied Cottage Chase (2017); Clonmel Oil Chase (2019)

Awards
- Top-rated Steeplechaser (2016/17)
- Last updated on 17 March 2017

Douvan (foaled 9 May 2010) is a French-bred, Irish-trained Thoroughbred racehorse who competes in National Hunt racing. He was originally trained in France before moving to Ireland in the summer of 2014. After finishing second on his debut he won his remaining five races over hurdles including the Moscow Flyer Novice Hurdle, Supreme Novices' Hurdle and Herald Champion Novice Hurdle. In the following year he was switched to steeplechasing and won all his six races over fences as a novice including the Racing Post Novice Chase, Arkle Novice Chase, Arkle Challenge Trophy, Maghull Novices' Chase and Ryanair Novice Chase. In the 2016–17 season he continued his unbeaten run in steeplechases by winning his first three starts, including the Grade One Paddy Power Cashcard Chase, before suffering his first defeat over fences when favourite for the Queen Mother Champion Chase.

== Background ==
Douvan is a bay gelding bred in Oise, France by the Haras de la Faisanderie. He was sired by Walk in the Park who finished second in the 2005 Epsom Derby and later became a successful National Hunt sire in Ireland. Douvan's dam Star Face was a descendant of the Irish broodmare Minnewaska, making her a distant relative of Ack Ack, Sham and Tom Rolfe.

Douvan began his racing career in the ownership of François-Xavier Chaussonnière and was initially trained in France by Philippe Peltier.

== Racing career ==
=== 2014/15 National Hunt season: novice hurdles ===
On his racecourse debut, Douvan finished second to Konig Dax in a hurdle race over 1600 metres at Saint-Malo on 14 May 2014. Nineteen days later he recorded his first success in a similar event at Compiègne, taking the lead after the final flight of hurdles and winning by two and a half lengths.

In the summer of 2014 Douvan was acquired by Rich and Susannah Ricci and was sent to Ireland to be trained by Willie Mullins. He made a successful first appearance for his new connections by winning a novice hurdle at Gowran Park on 22 November, beating Sizing John by twelve lengths at odds of 8/15. He was then stepped up in class for the Grade 2 Moscow Flyer Novice Hurdle at Punchestown in January. He started at odds of 1/3 and won "very easily" by three and three quarter lengths from the Mouse Morris-trained Alpha des Obeaux.

After an absence of two months, Douvan was sent to the Cheltenham Festival for the Supreme Novices' Hurdle on 10 March and started the 2/1 favourite in a twelve-runner field. The best fancied of his opponents were the Tolworth Hurdle winner L'Ami Serge, the Champion INH Flat Race winner Shaneshill (also trained by Mullins) and the improving handicapper Jollyallen. Ridden by Ruby Walsh, Douvan was not among the early leaders as the outsider Some Plan set the pace before making steady progress from the third last hurdle. He took the lead approaching the last and drew away on the run-in to win by four and a half lengths from Shaneshill. Walsh, who was winning the race for the third consecutive year, commented "he was plenty keen and I was probably in front soon enough but he kept going well and is a gorgeous horse. That's the first time he's had a race and you'd imagine he'll improve". On his final appearance of the season Douvan, with Walsh again in the saddle, contested the Grade 1 Herald Champion Novice Hurdle at Punchestown on 28 April. Starting at odds of 1/6 he took the lead at the last and won "easily" by seven and a half lengths from Sizing John. Mullins commented "He really flicks over his hurdles, you can’t see him rising. He's an amazing athlete for the size and scope of him. He's nearly 17 hands, a big, immature horse, and yet he can do all that".

=== 2015/16 National Hunt season: novice chases ===
In the 2015/16 National Hunt season Douvan was campaigned in novice steeplechases. On his first run over the larger obstacles he won at Navan Racecourse on 22 November, beating Rogue Trader by nine and a half lengths. With Ruby Walsh riding the stable's Vautour in England, Douvan was partnered by his trainer's son Patrick Mullins when he started 4/7 favourite for the Grade 1 Racing Post Novice Chase at Leopardstown Racecourse on 26 December. He led for most of the way and recovered from some jumping errors to pull away from his rivals after the last and win by eighteen lengths. Only two horses appeared to challenge Douvan in the Arkle Novice Chase over the same course and distance in January and the gelding won by fifteen lengths at odds of 1/14. After the race Willie Mullins said "He's so docile which means you can put him anywhere in a race when the time comes. It's as if he's just a different species. We don't know how good he is".

On 15 March, Douvan made his second appearance at Cheltenham and was made the 1/4 favourite for the Arkle Challenge Trophy against six opponents. He took the lead at the third fence and was left without any serious challengers when the Nicky Henderson-trained Vaniteux fell when under pressure at the penultimate obstacle. Douvan quickly went clear and survived a mistake at the last to win by seven lengths from his old rival Sizing John. At Aintree on 9 April he started the 2/13 favourite against four opponents in the Grade 1 Maghull Novices' Chase. After racing in second place he took the lead on the final turn and drew away over the last two fences to win by fourteen lengths from The Game Changer. Douvan ended his second season in the Ryanair Novice Chase at Punchestown on 28 April and started at odds of 2/9 against four opponents. On this occasion he led soon after the start and won by eleven lengths from The Game Changer.

== Pedigree ==
Pedigree of Douvan (FR), bay gelding, 2010
Sire Walk in the Park (IRE) 2002	Montjeu (IRE); 1996	Sadler's Wells	Northern Dancer
Sire Walk in the Park (IRE) 2002	Montjeu (IRE); 1996	Sadler's Wells	Fairy Bridge
Sire Walk in the Park (IRE) 2002	Montjeu (IRE); 1996	Floripedes	Top Ville
Sire Walk in the Park (IRE) 2002	Montjeu (IRE); 1996	Floripedes	Toute Cy
Sire Walk in the Park (IRE) 2002	Classic Park (GB); 1994	Robellino	Roberto
Sire Walk in the Park (IRE) 2002	Classic Park (GB); 1994	Robellino	Isobelline
Sire Walk in the Park (IRE) 2002	Classic Park (GB); 1994	Wanton	Kris
Sire Walk in the Park (IRE) 2002	Classic Park (GB); 1994	Wanton	Brazen Faced
Dam Star Face (FR) 2004	Saint des Saints (FR); 1998	Cadoudal	Green Dancer
Dam Star Face (FR) 2004	Saint des Saints (FR); 1998	Cadoudal	Come to Sea
Dam Star Face (FR) 2004	Saint des Saints (FR); 1998	Chamisene	Pharly
Dam Star Face (FR) 2004	Saint des Saints (FR); 1998	Chamisene	Tuneria
Dam Star Face (FR) 2004	Folie Star Gate (FR); 1997	Saint Preuil	Dom Pasquini
Dam Star Face (FR) 2004	Folie Star Gate (FR); 1997	Saint Preuil	Montecha
Dam Star Face (FR) 2004	Folie Star Gate (FR); 1997	Miss French	Mistigri
Dam Star Face (FR) 2004	Folie Star Gate (FR); 1997	Miss French	Lise Belle (Family:9-h)
