= PRL Champion Novice Hurdle =

Hurdle horse race in Ireland

- Class: Grade 1
- Location: Punchestown; County Kildare, Ireland
- Race type: Hurdle race
- Sponsor: PRL
- Website: Punchestown

Race information
- Distance: 2m 100y (3,219 metres)
- Surface: Turf
- Track: Right-handed
- Qualification: Five-years-old and up
- Weight: 11 st 12 lb Allowances; 7 lb for mares
- Purse: €125,000 (2022); 1st: €73,750

Herald Champion Novice Hurdle
2026
Eachtotheirown	Blake	Le Labo

Previous years
2025
Irancy	Salvator Mundi	Karbau
2024
Mystical Power	Firefox	Slade Steel
2023
Facile Vega	Il Etait Temps	No Looking Back
2022
Mighty Potter	Gatsby Grey	Sir Gerhard
2021
Echoes In Rain	Colonel Mustard	Blue Lord

2020-2011
2019
Klassical Dream	Felix Desjy	Mister Blue Sky
2018
Draconien	Vision Des Flos	Mengli Khan
2017
Cilaos Emery	Melon	Pingshou
2016
Don't Touch It	Petit Mouchoir	Brain Power
2015
Douvan	Sizing John	Blair Perrone
2014
Faugheen	Valseur Lido	Sgt Reckless
2013
Jezki	Ted Veale	Champagne Fever
2012
Alderwood	Trifolium	Simenon
2011
Shot From The Hip	Hidden Universe	Far Away So Close

2010-2003
2010
Blackstairmountain	Flat Out	Sweeps Hill
2009
Hurricane Fly	Kempes	Riverside Theatre
2008
Jered	Salford City	Fiveforthree
2007
Clopf	Holly Tree	Rindoon
2006
Iktitaf	Straw Bear	Jazz Messenger
2005
Wild Passion	Kill Devil Hill	In Compliance
2004
Brave Inca	Royal Shakespeare	Royal Alphabet
2003
Back In Front	Limerick Boy	Fota Island

The PRL Champion Novice Hurdle is a Grade 1 National Hunt hurdle race in Ireland which is open to horses aged five years or older. It is run at Punchestown over a distance of about 2 miles ½ furlong (2 miles and 100 yards, or 3,310 metres), and during its running there are nine hurdles to be jumped. The race is for novice hurdlers, and it is scheduled to take place each year during the Punchestown Festival in late April or early May.

The event was formerly open to horses aged four or older, and for a period it was sponsored by BMW. The minimum age was raised to five in 1992, and Country Pride took over the sponsorship in 1993. The race was promoted from Grade 2 to Grade 1 status in 1998.

The Evening Herald became the usual sponsor of the race in 2000. The event was subsequently backed by VC Bet, but the Evening Herald returned as sponsor in 2009. The race was rebranded as the Herald Champion Novice Hurdle in 2013 after the sponsoring newspaper changed its name. Ecomm Merchant Solutions took over sponsorship from the 2021 running, Bective Stud sponsored in 2022 and the current sponsors, KPMG, took over in 2023.

== Records ==
Leading jockey since 1980 (5 wins):

- Ruby Walsh - Iktitaf (2006), Hurricane Fly (2009), Faugheen (2014), Douvan (2015), Klassical Dream (2019)

Leading trainer since 1980 (11 wins):

- Willie Mullins - Hurricane Fly (2009), Blackstairmountain (2010), Faugheen (2014), Douvan (2015), Cilaos Emery (2017), Draconien (2018), Klassical Dream (2019), Echoes In Rain (2021), Facile Vega (2023), Mystical Power (2024), Irancy (2025)

== Winners since 1980 ==
Year	Winner	Age	Jockey	Trainer
1980	Deep Gale	7	Frank Codd (Note: amateur jockey)	Edward O'Grady
1981	Tie Anchor	4	Tommy McGivern	Paddy Prendergast, Jr.
1982	Bustineto	4	Niall Madden	Mick O'Toole
1983	Dawn Run	5	Tony Mullins	Paddy Mullins
1984	Gav's Delight	6	Ken Morgan	Michael Cunningham
1985	Hungary Hur	6	Tony Mullins	Paddy Mullins
1986	Barney Burnett	6	Brendan Sheridan	Ruby Walsh snr
1987	High Plains	5	Richard Dunwoody	David Nicholson
1988	El-Sid Senor	5	Frank Berry	Francis Flood
1989	The Proclamation	6	Richard Dunwoody	Paddy Prendergast, Jr.
1990	Vestris Abu	4	Charlie Swan	Jim Bolger
1991	Young Pokey	6	Jamie Osborne	Oliver Sherwood
1992	Fortune and Fame	5	Brendan Sheridan	Dermot Weld
1993	Bayrouge	5	Richard Dunwoody	Anne-Marie O'Brien
1994	Klairon Davis	5	Trevor Horgan	Arthur Moore
1995	Hotel Minella	8	Charlie Swan	Aidan O'Brien
1996	Dance Beat	5	John Shortt	Jessica Harrington
1997	Midnight Legend	6	Richard Johnson	David Nicholson
1998	His Song	5	Tony McCoy	Mouse Morris
1999	Cardinal Hill	5	Charlie Swan	Noel Meade
2000	Moscow Flyer	6	Barry Geraghty	Jessica Harrington
2001	Ned Kelly (Note: The 2001 running took place at Fairyhouse)	5	Norman Williamson	Edward O'Grady
2002	Scottish Memories	6	Paul Carberry	Noel Meade
2003	Back In Front	6	Norman Williamson	Edward O'Grady
2004	Brave Inca	6	Barry Cash	Colm Murphy
2005	Wild Passion	5	Paul Carberry	Noel Meade
2006	Iktitaf	5	Ruby Walsh	Noel Meade
2007	Clopf	6	Barry Geraghty	Edward O'Grady
2008	Jered	6	Tony McCoy	Noel Meade
2009	Hurricane Fly	5	Ruby Walsh	Willie Mullins
2010	Blackstairmountain	5	Paul Townend	Willie Mullins
2011	Shot From The Hip	7	Tony McCoy	Edward O'Grady
2012	Alderwood	8	Tony McCoy	Thomas Mullins
2013	Jezki	5	Barry Geraghty	Jessica Harrington
2014	Faugheen	6	Ruby Walsh	Willie Mullins
2015	Douvan	5	Ruby Walsh	Willie Mullins
2016	Don't Touch It	6	Barry Geraghty	Jessica Harrington
2017	Cilaos Emery	5	David Mullins	Willie Mullins
2018	Draconien	5	Noel Fehily	Willie Mullins
2019	Klassical Dream	5	Ruby Walsh	Willie Mullins
	no race 2020 (Note: The 2020 running was cancelled because of the COVID-19 pandemic in the Republic of Ireland)
2021	Echoes In Rain	5	Patrick Mullins	Willie Mullins
2022	Mighty Potter	5	Jack Kennedy	Gordon Elliott
2023	Facile Vega	6	Paul Townend	Willie Mullins
2024	Mystical Power	5	Mark Walsh	Willie Mullins
2025	Irancy	7	Mark Walsh	Willie Mullins
2026	Eachtotheirown	7	Sean Flanagan	Barry Connell

== See also ==
- Horse racing in Ireland
- List of Irish National Hunt races
