= Champion Stayers Hurdle =

Hurdle horse race in Ireland

- Class: Grade 1
- Location: Punchestown; County Kildare, Ireland
- Race type: Hurdle race
- Sponsor: Ladbrokes
- Website: Punchestown

Race information
- Distance: 3 miles (4,828 metres)
- Surface: Turf
- Track: Right-handed
- Qualification: Four-years-old and up
- Weight: 10 st 13 lb (4yo); 11 st 10 lb (5yo+); Allowances; 7 lb for fillies and mares
- Purse: €250,000 (2021); 1st: €147,500

Champion Stayers Hurdle
2026
Bob Olinger	Jimmy Du Seuil	Teahupoo

Previous years
2025
Teahupoo	Asterion Forlonge	Jetara
2024
Teahupoo	Asterion Forlonge	Home By The Lee
2023
Klassical Dream	Asterion Forlonge	Sire Du Berlais
2022
Klassical Dream	Ashdale Bob	Gentlemansgame
2021
Klassical Dream	James Du Berlais	Ronald Pump

2020-2011
2019
Unowhatimeanharry	Bacardys	Bapaume
2018
Faugheen	Penhill	Shaneshill
2017
Unowhatimeanharry	Nichols Canyon	Footpad
2016
One Track Mind	Jennies Jewel	Alpha Des Obeaux
2015
Jezki	Hurricane Fly	Zabana
2014
Jetson	Quevega	At Fishers Cross
2013
Quevega	Reve De Sivola	Zaidpour
2012
Quevega	Voler La Vedette	Mourad
2011
Quevega	Mourad	Carlito Brigante

2010-2003
2010
Quevega	Bensalem	Mourad
2009
Fiveforthree	Pettifour	Whatuthink
2008
Blazing Bailey	Refinement	Aitmatov
2007
Refinement	Powerstation	United
2006
Asian Maze	Kerryhead Windfarm	Fire Dragon
2005
Carlys Quest	Kadoun	Basilea Star
2004
Rhinestone Cowboy	Iris's Gift	Rosaker
2003
Holy Orders	Sacundai	Rostropovich

The Champion Stayers Hurdle is a Grade 1 National Hunt hurdle race in Ireland which is open to horses aged four years or older. It is run at Punchestown over a distance of about 3 miles (4,828 metres), and during its running there are fourteen hurdles to be jumped. The race is scheduled to take place each year during the Punchestown Festival in late April.

The race was known as the Tipperkevin Hurdle in the mid 1990s, and it was renamed the Champion Stayers Hurdle in 1997. It was sponsored by Ballymore Properties for much of the following decade, and was renamed the World Series Hurdle. Ladbrokes began supporting the race in 2008. It reverted to its former name in 2017.

The Champion Stayers Hurdle is the Irish equivalent of Britain's Stayers' Hurdle, and the last horse to win both races in the same year was Teahupoo in 2024.

== Records ==
Most successful horse since 1995 (4 wins):

- Quevega – 2010, 2011, 2012, 2013

Leading jockey since 1995 (5 wins):

- Ruby Walsh – Asian Maze (2006), Fiveforthree (2009), Quevega (2011, 2012, 2013)

Leading trainer since 1995 (10 wins):

- Willie Mullins – Holy Orders (2003), Fiveforthree (2009), Quevega (2010, 2011, 2012, 2013), Faugheen (2018), Klassical Dream (2021, 2022, 2023)

== Winners since 1995 ==
Year	Winner	Age	Jockey	Trainer
1995	Derrymoyle	6	Mark Dwyer	Michael Cunningham
1996	Derrymoyle	7	Mark Dwyer	Michael Cunningham
1997	Paddy's Return	5	Norman Williamson	Ferdy Murphy
1998	Derrymoyle	9	Tony McCoy	Michael Cunningham
1999	Anzum	8	Richard Johnson	David Nicholson
2000	Rubhahunish	9	Carl Llewellyn	Nigel Twiston-Davies
2001	Bannow Bay (Note: The 2001 running took place at Fairyhouse)	6	Charlie Swan	Christy Roche
2002	Limestone Lad	10	Paul Carberry	James Bowe
2003	Holy Orders	6	Shay Barry	Willie Mullins
2004	Rhinestone Cowboy	8	J. P. Magnier (Note: amateur jockey)	Jonjo O'Neill
2005	Carlys Quest	11	Keith Mercer	Ferdy Murphy
2006	Asian Maze	7	Ruby Walsh	Tom Mullins
2007	Refinement	8	Tony McCoy	Jonjo O'Neill
2008	Blazing Bailey	6	Robert Thornton	Alan King
2009	Fiveforthree	7	Ruby Walsh	Willie Mullins
2010	Quevega	6	Paul Townend	Willie Mullins
2011	Quevega	7	Ruby Walsh	Willie Mullins
2012	Quevega	8	Ruby Walsh	Willie Mullins
2013	Quevega	9	Ruby Walsh	Willie Mullins
2014	Jetson	9	Davy Russell	Jessica Harrington
2015	Jezki	7	Mark Walsh	Jessica Harrington
2016	One Track Mind	6	Gavin Sheehan	Warren Greatrex
2017	Unowhatimeanharry	9	Noel Fehily	Harry Fry
2018	Faugheen	10	David Mullins	Willie Mullins
2019	Unowhatimeanharry	11	Mark Walsh	Harry Fry
	no race 2020 (Note: The 2020 running was cancelled because of the COVID-19 pandemic in the Republic of Ireland)
2021	Klassical Dream	7	Patrick Mullins (Note: amateur rider)	Willie Mullins
2022	Klassical Dream	8	Paul Townend	Willie Mullins
2023	Klassical Dream	9	Paul Townend	Willie Mullins
2024	Teahupoo	7	Jack Kennedy	Gordon Elliott
2025	Teahupoo	8	Sam Ewing	Gordon Elliott
2026	Bob Olinger	11	Darragh O'Keeffe	Henry de Bromhead

== See also ==
- Horse racing in Ireland
- List of Irish National Hunt races
