= Patrick Mullins (jockey) =

Irish amateur jockey (born 1989)

Personal information
- Other names: PW Mullins
- Nationality: (Republic of Ireland) Irish
- Born: 5 December 1989 (age 36) County Carlow, Republic of Ireland
- Occupation: Jockey
- Children: 1

Horse racing career
- Sport: Horse racing
- Career wins: 879

Major racing wins
- Champion Bumper (2008, 2012, 2022, 2024); Galway Hurdle (2018, 2021); Punchestown Champion Chase (2018); Champion Stayers Hurdle (2021); Punchestown Champion Hurdle (2017); December Festival Hurdle (2018, 2019, 2021); Champion INH Flat Race (2008, 2011, 2015, 2022); Faugheen Novice Chase (2023); Morgiana Hurdle (2021); KPMG Champion Novice Hurdle (2021); Grand National (2025); Aintree Bowl (2025)

Racing awards
- Irish Champion Amateur (15 times)

Significant horses
- Allaho, Bacardys, Bellshill, Champagne Fever, Cousin Vinny, Echoes In Rain, Facile Vega, Faugheen, Gaelic Warrior, Jasmin De Vaux, Klassical Dream, Lovethehigherlaw, Min, Nick Rockett, Sharjah, Un de Sceaux, Wicklow Brave

Patrick Mullins (born 5 December 1989), also known as PW Mullins, is an Irish amateur National Hunt jockey and assistant trainer from County Carlow. He is based mainly in Ireland, riding for his father Willie Mullins, and acting as assistant trainer to him. Mullins rode Nick Rockett to the 2025 Randox Grand National title. His rides have earned more than €3.8m and £1.5m in prize money in the five seasons between 2020/21 and 2024/5. As an amateur, Mullins does not receive a fee for riding or a share of prize money. He has won the Galway Hurdle on three occasions, and Cheltenham's Champion Bumper on four occasions, including with Champagne Fever in 2012.

== Cheltenham Festival winners (10) ==
- Champion Bumper – (4) Cousin Vinny (2008), Champagne Fever (2012), Facile Vega (2022), Jasmin De Vaux (2024)
- Triumph Hurdle - (1) Apolon De Charnie (2026)
- National Hunt Challenge Cup – (4) Back in Focus (2013), Rathvinden (2018), Stattler (2022), Gaillard Du Mesnil (2023)
- St James's Place Festival Hunter Chase – (1) Billaway (2022)

== Major wins ==
(Republic of Ireland) Ireland

- Morgiana Hurdle – (1) Sharjah (2021)
- John Durkan Chase – (3) Min (2020), Allaho (2021), Final Demand (2026)
- Faugheen Novice Chase – (3) Faugheen (2019), Gaelic Warrior (2023), Final Demand (2025)
- December Festival Hurdle – (4) Sharjah (2018, 2019, 2020, 2021)
- Tattersalls Ireland Novice Hurdle – (1) Bacardys (2017)
- KPMG Champion Novice Hurdle – (1) Echoes In Rain (2021)
- Punchestown Champion Chase – (1) Un de Sceaux (2018)
- Champion INH Flat Race – (5) Cousin Vinny (2008), Lovethehigherlaw (2011), Champagne Fever (2012), Bellshill (2015), Facile Vega (2022)
- Champion Stayers Hurdle – (1) Klassical Dream (2021)
- Punchestown Champion Hurdle – (1) Wicklow Brave (2017)
- Alanna Homes Champion Novice Hurdle – (1) Bacardys (2017)

(United Kingdom) Great Britain

- Grand National – (1) Nick Rockett (2025)
- Aintree Bowl – (1) Gaelic Warrior (2025)
