= Morgiana Hurdle =

Hurdle horse race in Ireland

- Class: Grade 1
- Location: Punchestown; County Kildare, Ireland
- Race type: Hurdle race
- Sponsor: Unibet
- Website: Punchestown

Race information
- Distance: 2m 100y (3,310 metres)
- Surface: Turf
- Track: Right-handed
- Qualification: Four-years-old and up
- Weight: 11 st 12 lb Allowances; 7 lb for fillies and mares
- Purse: €100,000 (2022); 1st: €59,000

Morgiana Hurdle
2025
| Lossiemouth | Glen Kiln | Ndaawi |

Previous years
2024
Brighterdaysahead | State Man | Winter Fog
2023
State Man | Echoes In Rain | Fils D'oudairies
2022
State Man | Sharjah | Saldier
2021
Sharjah | Zanahiyr | Echoes In Rain

2020-2011
2020
Abacadabras | Saint Roi | Jason The Militant
2019
Saldier | Petit Mouchoir | Klassical Dream
2018
Sharjah | Faugheen | Tombstone
2017
Faugheen | Jezki | Swamp Fox
2016
Nichols Canyon | Jer's Girl | Ivanovich Gorbatov
2015
Nichols Canyon | Faugheen | Wicklow Brave
2014
Hurricane Fly | Jezki | Little King Robin
2013
Hurricane Fly | Marito | Mikael D'Haguenet
2012
Hurricane Fly | Captain Cee Bee | Go Native
2011
Thousand Stars | Oscars Well | Pittoni

2010-2001
2010
Solwhit | Voler La Vedette | Donnas Palm
2009
Solwhit | Muirhead | Hurricane Fly
2008
Hardy Eustace | Sizing Europe | Jered
2007
Jazz Messenger | Farmer Brown | Macs Joy
2006
Iktitaf | Asian Maze | Brave Inca
2005
Brave Inca | Essex | Harchibald
2004
Harchibald | Back In Front | Macs Joy
2003
Back In Front | Sacundai | Solerina
2002
Limestone Lad | Bob Justice | Fnan
2001
Limestone Lad | Ned Kelly | Youlneverwalkalone

2000-1991
2000
Moscow Flyer | Samapour | Commanche Court
1999
Limestone Lad | Golden Rule | Nomadic
1998
Nomadic | Commanche Court | Magical Lady
1997
Cockney Lad | Just Little | Lady Daisy I
1996
Cockney Lad | Hill Society | Lady Arpel
1995
Beakstown | Sambara | Reasilvia
1994
Danoli | Diplomatic | Alligator Joe
1993
Padashpan | Shuil Ar Aghaidh | Shawiya
1992
Destriero | Last Goodbye | Harveysland
1991
Nancy Myles | Minorettes Girl | Only two ran

1990-1988
1990
Mutare | Trapper John | Glamorous Gale
1989
Grabel | North To Alaska | Glenair Lady
1988
Grabel | Flying Whisper | Flying Trove

The Morgiana Hurdle is a Grade 1 National Hunt hurdle race in Ireland which is open to horses aged four years or older. It is run at Punchestown over a distance of about 2 miles and half a furlong (2 miles and 100 yards, or 3,310 metres), and it is scheduled to take place each year in November.

The event was formerly contested over 2 1/2 miles, and for a period it was classed at Listed level. It was cut by 2 furlongs in 1992, and it was given Grade 2 status in 1994. The race was shortened to its present length in 1995 and was promoted to Grade 1 level in 2006.

Previous sponsors of the Morgiana Hurdle have included Ballymore Properties, Maplewood Developments, Dobbins & Madigans and Ladbrokes.

== Records ==
Most successful horse since 1988 (3 wins):

- Limestone Lad – 1999, 2001, 2002
- Hurricane Fly - 2012, 2013, 2014

Leading jockey since 1988 (6 wins):

- Paul Carberry – Nomadic (1998), Limestone Lad (2001, 2002), Harchibald (2004), Iktitaf (2006), Jazz Messenger (2007)
- Paul Townend - Faugheen (2017), Sharjah (2018), State Man (2022, 2023), Lossiemouth (2025, 2026)

Leading trainer since 1988 (15 wins):

- Willie Mullins - Padashpan (1993), Thousand Stars (2011), Hurricane Fly (2012, 2013, 2014), Nichols Canyon (2015, 2016), Faugheen (2017), Sharjah (2018,2021), Saldier (2019), State Man (2022,2023), Lossiemouth (2025, 2026)

== Winners since 1988 ==
| Year | Winner | Age | Jockey | Trainer |
|---|---|---|---|---|
| 1988 | Grabel | 5 | Tony Mullins | Paddy Mullins |
| 1989 | Grabel | 6 | Tony Mullins | Paddy Mullins |
| 1990 | Mutare | 5 | D. H. O'Connor | John W. Nicholson |
| 1991 | Nancy Myles | 6 | Fran Flood | Francis Flood |
| 1992 | Destriero | 6 | Charlie Swan | J. J. Furlong |
| 1993 | Padashpan | 4 | P. Morris | Willie Mullins |
| 1994 | Danoli | 6 | Charlie Swan | Tom Foley |
| 1995 | Beakstown | 6 | Tommy Treacy | Paddy Mullins |
| 1996 | Cockney Lad | 7 | Charlie Swan | Noel Meade |
| 1997 | Cockney Lad (Note: The 1997 running took place at Cork) | 8 | Barry Geraghty | Noel Meade |
| 1998 | Nomadic | 4 | Paul Carberry | Noel Meade |
| 1999 | Limestone Lad | 7 | Shane McGovern | James Bowe |
| 2000 | Moscow Flyer | 6 | Paul Moloney | Jessica Harrington |
| 2001 | Limestone Lad | 9 | Paul Carberry | James Bowe |
| 2002 | Limestone Lad (Note: The 2002 edition was held at Navan) | 10 | Paul Carberry | James Bowe |
| 2003 | Back In Front | 6 | Barry Geraghty | Edward O'Grady |
| 2004 | Harchibald | 5 | Paul Carberry | Noel Meade |
| 2005 | Brave Inca | 7 | Tony McCoy | Colm Murphy |
| 2006 | Iktitaf | 5 | Paul Carberry | Noel Meade |
| 2007 | Jazz Messenger | 7 | Paul Carberry | Noel Meade |
| 2008 | Hardy Eustace | 11 | Paddy Flood | Dessie Hughes |
| 2009 | Solwhit | 5 | Davy Russell | Charles Byrnes |
| 2010 | Solwhit | 6 | Davy Russell | Charles Byrnes |
| 2011 | Thousand Stars | 7 | Ruby Walsh | Willie Mullins |
| 2012 | Hurricane Fly | 8 | Ruby Walsh | Willie Mullins |
| 2013 | Hurricane Fly | 9 | Ruby Walsh | Willie Mullins |
| 2014 | Hurricane Fly | 10 | Ruby Walsh | Willie Mullins |
| 2015 | Nichols Canyon | 5 | David Mullins | Willie Mullins |
| 2016 | Nichols Canyon | 6 | Ruby Walsh | Willie Mullins |
| 2017 | Faugheen | 9 | Paul Townend | Willie Mullins |
| 2018 | Sharjah | 5 | Paul Townend | Willie Mullins |
| 2019 | Saldier | 5 | Danny Mullins | Willie Mullins |
| 2020 | Abacadabras | 6 | Jack Kennedy | Gordon Elliott |
| 2021 | Sharjah | 8 | Patrick Mullins (Note: amateur jockey) | Willie Mullins |
| 2022 | State Man | 5 | Paul Townend | Willie Mullins |
| 2023 | State Man | 6 | Paul Townend | Willie Mullins |
| 2024 | Brighterdaysahead | 5 | Jack Kennedy | Gordon Elliott |
| 2025 | Lossiemouth | 6 | Paul Townend | Willie Mullins |
| 2026 | Lossiemouth | 7 | Paul Townend | Willie Mullins |

== See also ==
- Horse racing in Ireland
- List of Irish National Hunt races
