= Blackstairmountain =

Irish-bred Thoroughbred racehorse

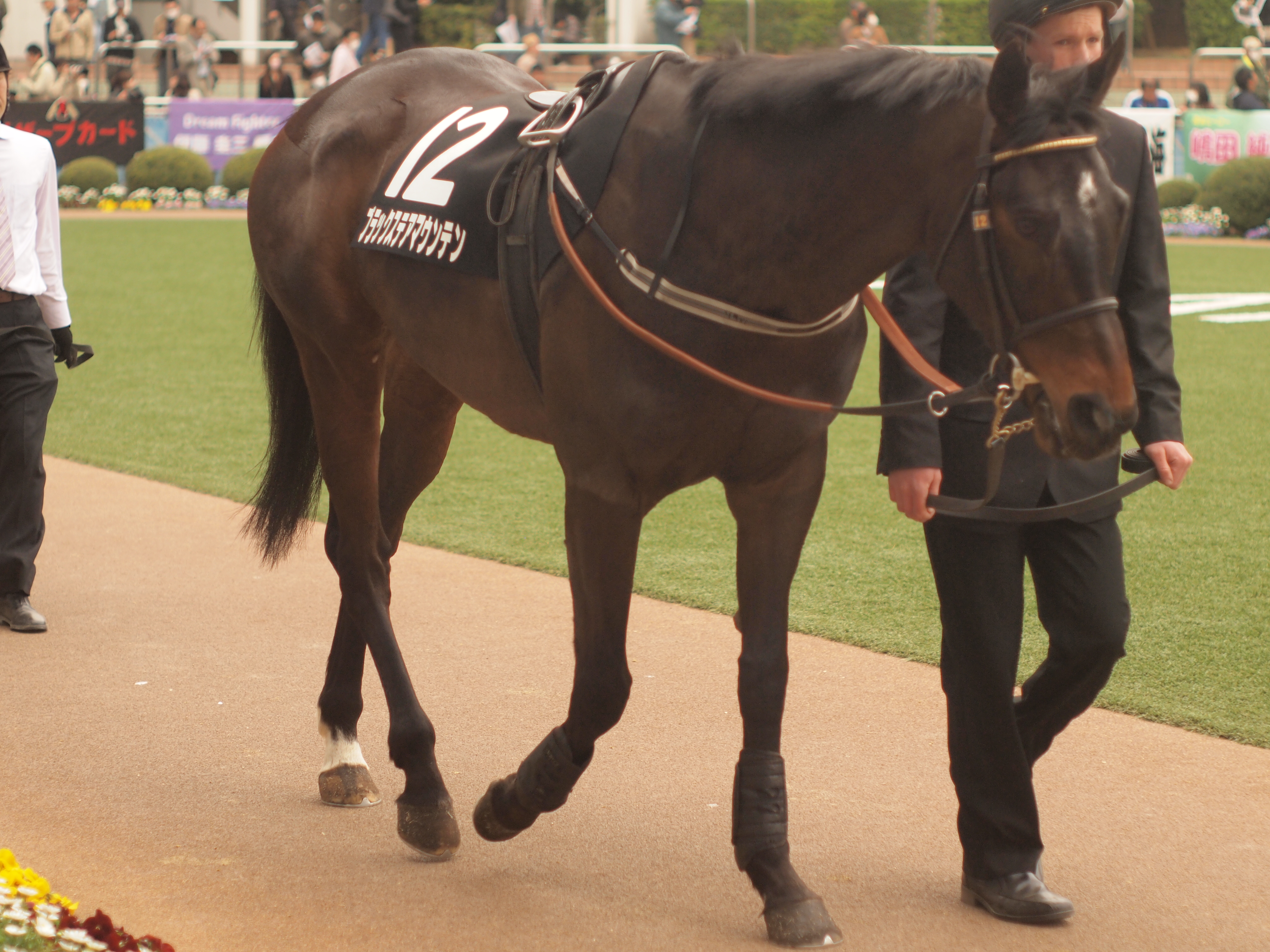
- Blackstairmountain at the Pegasus Jump Stakes in Japan in March 2013
- Sire: Imperial Ballet
- Grandsire: Sadler's Wells
- Dam: Sixhills
- Damsire: Sabrehill
- Sex: Gelding
- Foaled: 8 March 2005
- Country: Ireland
- Colour: Bay
- Breeder: Mrs J M Mullins
- Owner: Mrs J M Mullins; Susannah Ricci
- Trainer: Willie Mullins
- Record: 30: 11-8-1
- Earnings: £668,786

Major wins
- Evening Herald Champion Novice Hurdle (2010); Racing Post Novice Chase (2011); Nakayama Grand Jump (2013)

Blackstairmountain is an Irish racehorse best known for winning the Nakayama Grand Jump in 2013. He is the first horse trained in Europe to win the race.

== Background ==
Blackstairmountain is a dark-coated bay gelding with a white star bred in Ireland by Mrs J M Mullins. His sire Imperial Ballet was a winner of the Royal Hunt Cup and a son of Sadler's Wells. He has proved a versatile stallion: apart from Blackstairmountain, his most significant winner has been the sprinter Imperial Beauty, the winner of the Prix de l'Abbaye.

The gelding, who is named after Blackstairs Mountain in Leinster is owned by Susannah Ricci and trained by Willie Mullins at Muine Beag, County Carlow.

== Racing career ==
Blackstairmountain began his racing career in 2009, when he won National Hunt Flat races at Thurles and Tipperary and a conventional flat race at Galway Racecourse. In the following year, he competed in hurdle races and recorded his first major success when taking the Grade I Evening Herald Champion Novice Hurdle at the Punchestown Festival in May. After the race, Mullins explained that the horse had been particularly well-suited by the firm ground. Blackstairmountain failed to win in five hurdle races in the 2010/2011 National Hunt season before being campaigned in steeplechases. He began promisingly, winning the Grade I Racing Post Novice Chase on his second appearance over larger obstacles, but he failed to maintain his form and finished fifth of the six runners in the Arkle Challenge Trophy at the Cheltenham Festival, beaten thirty-six lengths by Sprinter Sacre.

In the summer of 2012, Blackstairmountain won two minor flat races at Bellewstown before returning to jump racing in autumn. In the 2012/2013 National Hunt season, he won a handicap hurdle at Cork Racecourse in January before being sent to Japan in March. On his Japanese debut he made no impression as he finished ninth behind Rikiai Kurofune in the Pegasus Jump at Nakayama Racecourse. On 13 April Blackstairmountain, ridden by Ruby Walsh started a 25/1 outsider for the Nakayama Grand Jump, the world's richest steeplechase. He took the lead at the final fence and held off a late challenge from Rikiai Kurofune to win by half a length. Mullins later revealed that he had been planning an attempt on the race for a decade, and that it had taken him "a few years to find a horse good enough".

== Pedigree ==
Pedigree of Blackstairmountain (IRE), bay gelding, 2005
Sire Imperial Ballet (IRE) 1989	Sadler's Wells; 1981	Northern Dancer	Nearctic
Sire Imperial Ballet (IRE) 1989	Sadler's Wells; 1981	Northern Dancer	Natalma
Sire Imperial Ballet (IRE) 1989	Sadler's Wells; 1981	Fairy Bridge	Bold Reason
Sire Imperial Ballet (IRE) 1989	Sadler's Wells; 1981	Fairy Bridge	Special
Sire Imperial Ballet (IRE) 1989	Amaranda; 1975	Bold Lad	Bold Ruler
Sire Imperial Ballet (IRE) 1989	Amaranda; 1975	Bold Lad	Barn Pride
Sire Imperial Ballet (IRE) 1989	Amaranda; 1975	Favoletta	Baldric
Sire Imperial Ballet (IRE) 1989	Amaranda; 1975	Favoletta	Violetta
Dam Sixhills (FR) 1999	Sabrehill; 1990	Diesis	Sharpen Up
Dam Sixhills (FR) 1999	Sabrehill; 1990	Diesis	Doubly Sure
Dam Sixhills (FR) 1999	Sabrehill; 1990	Gypsy Talk	Alleged
Dam Sixhills (FR) 1999	Sabrehill; 1990	Gypsy Talk	Mazaca
Dam Sixhills (FR) 1999	Moidart; 1990	Electric	Blakeney
Dam Sixhills (FR) 1999	Moidart; 1990	Electric	Cristiana
Dam Sixhills (FR) 1999	Moidart; 1990	Marypark	Charlottown
Dam Sixhills (FR) 1999	Moidart; 1990	Marypark	Margaret Ann (Family 9-c)
