= Noel Meade =

Irish racehorse trainer

Personal information
- Born: Ireland
- Occupation: Horse trainer

Horse racing career
- Sport: Horse racing

Racing awards
- Irish Champion Trainer (7 times)

Significant horses
- Road To Respect, Disko, Snow Falcon, Road To Riches, Go Native, Aran Concerto, Pandorama, Harchibald, Casey Jones, Jered, Aitmatov, Jazz Messenger, Muirhead, Mick The Man, Mr. Nosie, Nicanor, Iktitaf, Wild Passion, More Rainbows, Watson Lake, Thari, Scottish Memories, The Bunny Boiler, Strong Run, Harbour Pilot, Sausalito Bay, Frozen Groom, Sydney Two Thousand, Cardinal Hill, Native Estates, Cockney Lad, Heist, Johnny Setaside, Glencloud, Tiananmen Square, Novello Allegro, Street Rebel, Dromod Hill, Rangoon Ruby, National Form, Pinch Hitter, Sweet Mint
- Updated on 30 January 2010

Noel Meade is a horse trainer from Castletown, County Meath, Ireland. He established Tu Va Stables in County Meath as a place to train his horses.

== Early career: flat racing ==
Meade began his career as a horse trainer in 1971, but it was not until 1978 that Meade started to become well recognised. Sweet Mint, winner of the Cork and Orrery Stakes in 1978 at Royal Ascot, was the first winner trained by Meade. That win generally thought of as the one that gained Meade notoriety in the horse racing community. He continued his rise to fame with wins in the early 1980s with Pinch Hitter and Steel Duke.

== National Hunt racing ==
In the 1990s, Meade began to focus on National Hunt racing. The decade saw Meade train several horses believed to have great potential, but all of whom went on to have short careers in the National hunt circuit. His first successful horse in National Hunt racing was Tiananmen Square, for which Meade had high hopes after winning at the 1992 Punchestown Champion Bumper at the Punchestown Festival. However, constant injuries kept Tiananmen Square from reaching the potential Meade believed he had. In the mid 1990s, Meade partnered up with jockey Paul Carberry. The pair had quick success with Johnny Setaside who went on to win the 1995 Drinmore Novice Chase. Unfortunately, after winning the 1996 Ericsson Chase, Johnny Setaside died. Towards the end of the 1990s, Cardinal Hill, winner of the 1999 Punchestown Champion Novice Hurdle, was believed to be one of Meade's most talented horses during his 36-year career. However, Cardinal Hill's success was short lived, as he was fatally stricken with a case of colic in 1999. Speaking about Cardinal Hill, Meade was quoted as saying: The loss of Cardinal Hill was particularly hard to take. People say that its all part of the game and that is true to an extent, but that particular horse was very close to my heart and his death had a big impact on me. Those were tough times and hopefully we won’t have to endure another loss like it. This was yet another example of a talented horse that was never able to reach his full potential under the guidance of Meade.

At the turn of the century, Meade’s luck changed. After 22 years, he earned his first Cheltenham Festival win in 2000 when Sausalito Bay won the Supreme Novices' Hurdle. Since his first win, Meade has trained two other winners (Nicanor, Go Native) at Cheltenham.

== Cheltenham success ==
In the 2001–02 season, Harbour Pilot won the Drinmore Novice Chase and the Dr P. J. Moriarty Novice Chase. The Bunny Boiler won the Midlands National Crown and the Irish Grand National, completing a remarkable double over the span of just two weeks. Two other Meade trained horses, Scottish Memories and Strong Run, completed another memorable double for the trainer, as they went on to win the 2002 Punchestown Champion Novice Hurdle and the Punchestown Champion Chase respectively on the same day.

The 2004/05 season saw the emergence of Harchibald, arguably Meade's most successful National Hunt horse. Harchibald went on to win the 2004 Morgiana Hurdle, Fighting Fifth Hurdle and Christmas Hurdle. At the time, Harchibald was Meade's his best chance to win his first Champion Hurdle at the Cheltenham Festival. However, Harchibald was closely defeated by Hardy Eustace at the 2005 Champion Festival, leaving Meade winless at the venue. Harchibald still went on to find success after the loss, winning the 2005 Bula Hurdle, 2007 Fighting Fifth Hurdle and the 2008 Christmas Hurdle.

Subsequently, Meade trained three promising horses, Aran Concerto, Pandorama and Go Native, all of whom have gone on to win several Grade 1 races. Aran Concerto has raced his way to wins in the 2007 Deloitte Novice Hurdle and 2009 Powers Gold Cup, while Pandorama has won the 2009 Drinmore Novice Chase and Deloitte Novice Hurdle. Go Native won the 2009 Supreme Novices Hurdle, as well as the Fighting Fifth Hurdle and Christmas Hurdle. Winning the latter two put Go Native in position to capture the £1m bonus offered by WBX for achieving the Triple Crown of Hurdling. As the horse's trainer, Noel Meade would have been awarded £150,000 of the bonus. However, Go Native came up short at the Champion Hurdle, finishing in 10th place.

== Honours ==
Meade has been crowned Champion Trainer in Ireland seven times and won five National Hunt trainer titles. For all Meade's accomplishments in National Hunt racing, he still lacks wins in the Cheltenham Gold Cup, Champion Hurdle and the Grand National.

== Cheltenham Festival winners (7) ==
- Supreme Novices' Hurdle (2) Sausilito Bay (2000), Go Native (2009)
- Baring Bingham Novices' Hurdle - (1) Nicanor (2006)
- Spa Novices' Hurdle - (1) Very Wood (2014)
- Champion Bumper - (1) The Mourne Rambler (2026)
- Brown Advisory & Merriebelle Stable Plate Handicap Chase - (1) Road to Respect (2017)
- Fred Winter Juvenile Novices' Handicap Hurdle - (1) - Jeff Kidder (2021)

== Major wins ==
(Republic of Ireland) Ireland

- Tattersalls Gold Cup - (1) Helvic Dream (2021)
- Irish Champion Hurdle - (1) Cockney Lad (1997)
- Punchestown Champion Chase - (1) Strong Run (2002)
- Ryanair Gold Cup - (4) Thari (2003), Aran Concerto (2009), Realt Dubh (2011), Road To Respect (2017)
- Champion INH Flat Race - (4) Tiananmen Square (1992), Geill Sli (2004), Leading Run (2006), Mick the Man (2007)
- Ryanair Novice Chase - (1) Sydney Twothousand (1999)
- Alanna Homes Champion Novice Hurdle - (1) Nicanor (2006)
- Champion Four Year Old Hurdle - (2) Atherstone (1985), Jeff Kidder (2021)
- Dooley Insurance Group Champion Novice Chase - (1) Disko (2017)
- Herald Champion Novice Hurdle - (5) Cardinal Hill (1999), Scottish Memories (2002), Wild Passion (2005), Iktitaf (2006), Jered (2008)
- Irish Daily Mirror Novice Hurdle - (1) Casey Jones (2007)
- Morgiana Hurdle - (6) Cockney Lad (1996,1997), Nomadic (1998), Harchibald (2004), Iktitaf (2006), Jazz Messenger (2007)
- Royal Bond Novice Hurdle - (3) Wild Passion (2004), Iktitaf (2005), Muirhead (2007)
- Drinmore Novice Chase - (5) Johnny Setaside (1995), Harbour Pilot (2001), Watson Lake (2004), Pandorama (2009), Beacon Edge (2021)
- Hatton's Grace Hurdle - (1) Aitmatov (2007)
- Racing Post Novice Chase - (2) Dardjini (1997), Realt Dubh (2010)
- Chanelle Pharma Novice Hurdle - (4) Native Estates (1998), Mr Nosie (2006), Aran Concerto (2007), Pandorama (2009)
- Paddy Power Future Champions Novice Hurdle - (2) Mr Nosie (2005), Hollo Ladies (2009)
- Christmas Hurdle (Ireland) - (2) Rosaker (2005), Monksland (2012)
- Dr P. J. Moriarty Novice Chase - (3) Harbour Pilot (2002), Apache Stronghold (2015), Disko (2017)
- Savills Chase - (5) Johnny Setaside (1995), Pandorama (2010), Road To Riches (2014), Road to Respect (2017), Affordale Fury (2025)
- December Festival Hurdle - (1) Novello Allegro (1992)
- Fort Leney Novice Chase - (2) Casey Jones (2008), Pandorama (2009)
- Slaney Novice Hurdle - (2) Toofarback (2006), Monksland (2012)
- Mares Novice Hurdle Championship Final - (1) Bondi Storm (2001)
- Ladbrokes Champion Chase - (3) Road to Riches (2014), Road to Respect (2018, 2019)
- Golden Cygnet Novice Hurdle - (2) Pietro Vannucci (2002), Nicanor (2006)
- Spring Juvenile Hurdle - (2) Shirley's Delight (1994), Power Elite (2004),
- Arkle Novice Chase - (2) Frozen Groom (2000), Realt Dubh (2011)

(United Kingdom) Great Britain

- Diamond Jubilee Stakes - (1) Sweet Mint (1978)
- Fighting Fifth Hurdle - (3) Harchibald (2004, 2007), Go Native (2009)
- Christmas Hurdle - (4) Harchibald (2004, 2008), Jazz Messenger (2006), Go Native (2009)
