= Alanna Homes Champion Novice Hurdle =

Hurdle horse race in Ireland

- Class: Grade 1
- Location: Punchestown; County Kildare, Ireland
- Race type: Hurdle race
- Sponsor: Alanna Homes
- Website: Punchestown

Race information
- Distance: 2m 4f (4,023 metres)
- Surface: Turf
- Track: Right-handed
- Qualification: Four-years-old and up
- Weight: 11 st 1 lb (4yo); 11 st 12 lb (5yo+); Allowances; 7 lb for fillies and mares
- Purse: €100,000 (2021); 1st: €59,000

Champion Novice Hurdle
2026
King Rasko Grey	Lord Byron	Kiely's Place

Previous years
2025
Final Demand	Lovely Hurling	Tripoli Flyer
2024
Ballyburn	Jetara	Predators Gold
2023
Impaire Et Passe	High Definition	Champ Kiely
2022
State Man	Flame Bearer	Three Stripe Life
2021
Gaillard Du Mesnil	Ashdale Bob	N'golo

2020-2011
2019
Reserve Tank	Sams Profile	Eglantine Du Seuil
2018
Dortmund Park	Whiskey Sour	Burrows Saint
2017
Bacardys	Finian's Oscar	Death Duty
2016
Jer's Girl	O O Seven	Thomas Hobson
2015
Nichols Canyon	Alpha Des Obeaux	Outlander
2014
Vautour	Apache Stronghold	Lieutenant Colonel
2013
Un Atout	Ubak	Sizing Rio
2012
Dedigout	Colour Squadron	Lyreen Legend
2011
Spirit of Adjisa	Prima Vista	First Lieutenant

2010-2003
2010
Reve De Sivola	Fionnegas	Duke Of Lucca
2009
Mikael D'haguenet	Cousin Vinny	Bouggler
2008
Tranquil Sea	Fiveforthree	Trafford Lad
2007
Glencove Marina	Kalderon	Breaking Silence
2006
Nicanor	Mounthenry	Vic Venturi
2005
Asian Maze	Kerryhead Windfarm	Washington Lad
2004
Sadlers Wings	Kadiskar	Kildare
2003
Nobody Told Me	Jack High	Pay It Forward

The Alanna Homes Champion Novice Hurdle is a Grade 1 National Hunt hurdle race in Ireland which is open to horses aged four years or older. It is run at Punchestown over a distance of about 2 miles and 4 furlongs (4,023 metres), and during its running there are twelve hurdles to be jumped. The race is for novice hurdlers, and it is scheduled to take place each year during the Punchestown Festival in late April or early May.

Previous sponsors of the race have included Menolly Homes, Dunboyne Castle Hotel and Land Rover. Swordlestown Stud, sponsored the race from 2010 to 2012 and it was named in memory of the stud's former owner Cathal Ryan. Tattersalls Ireland sponsored the race from 2013 to 2017 while Profile Systems were the 2018 sponsors. The current sponsor, Alanna Homes, began sponsoring the race in 2019.

The field usually includes horses which ran previously in the Gallagher Novices' Hurdle at Cheltenham, and the last to win both races was King Rasko Grey in 2026.

== Records ==
Leading jockey since 1995 (8 wins):

- Ruby Walsh – Davenport Milenium (2002), Nobody Told Me (2003), Sadlers Wings (2004), Nicanor (2006), Glencove Marina (2007), Mikael d'Haguenet (2009), Vautour (2014), Nichols Canyon (2015)

Leading trainer since 1995 (15 wins):

- Willie Mullins – Davenport Milenium (2002), Nobody Told Me (2003), Sadlers Wings (2004), Glencove Marina (2007), Mikael d'Haguenet (2009), Un Atout (2013), Vautour (2014), Nichols Canyon (2015), Bacardys (2017), Gaillard Du Mesnil (2021), State Man (2022), Impaire Et Passe (2023), Ballyburn (2024), Final Demand (2025), King Rasko Grey (2026)

== Winners since 1995 ==
Year	Winner	Age	Jockey	Trainer
1995	Treble Bob	5	Richard Dunwoody	Dermot Weld
1996	Castlekellyleader	7	Tommy Treacy	Paddy Mullins
1997	Istabraq	5	Charlie Swan	Aidan O'Brien
1998	Ballygowan Beauty	6	Conor O'Dwyer	Michael Hourigan
1999	Native Upmanship	6	Tommy Treacy	Arthur Moore
2000	What's Up Boys	6	Richard Johnson	Philip Hobbs
2001	Colonel Braxton (Note: The 2001 running took place at Fairyhouse)	6	Kieran Kelly	Dessie Hughes
2002	Davenport Milenium	6	Ruby Walsh	Willie Mullins
2003	Nobody Told Me	5	Ruby Walsh	Willie Mullins
2004	Sadlers Wings	6	Ruby Walsh	Willie Mullins
2005	Asian Maze	6	Paul Carberry	Tom Mullins
2006	Nicanor	5	Ruby Walsh	Noel Meade
2007	Glencove Marina	5	Ruby Walsh	Willie Mullins
2008	Tranquil Sea	6	Andrew McNamara	Edward O'Grady
2009	Mikael d'Haguenet	5	Ruby Walsh	Willie Mullins
2010	Reve de Sivola	5	Daryl Jacob	Nick Williams
2011	Spirit of Adjisa	7	Richard Johnson	Tim Vaughan
2012	Dedigout	6	Davy Russell	Tony Martin
2013	Un Atout	5	Davy Russell	Willie Mullins
2014	Vautour	5	Ruby Walsh	Willie Mullins
2015	Nichols Canyon	5	Ruby Walsh	Willie Mullins
2016	Jer's Girl	4	Barry Geraghty	Gavin Cromwell
2017	Bacardys	6	Patrick Mullins (Note: amateur jockey)	Willie Mullins
2018	Dortmund Park	5	Jack Kennedy	Gordon Elliott
2019	Reserve Tank	5	Robbie Power	Colin Tizzard
	no race 2020 (Note: The 2020 running was cancelled because of the COVID-19 pandemic in the Republic of Ireland)
2021	Gaillard Du Mesnil	5	Paul Townend	Willie Mullins
2022	State Man	5	Paul Townend	Willie Mullins
2023	Impaire Et Passe	5	Paul Townend	Willie Mullins
2024	Ballyburn	6	Paul Townend	Willie Mullins
2025	Final Demand	6	Paul Townend	Willie Mullins
2026	King Rasko Grey	6	Paul Townend	Willie Mullins

== See also ==
- Horse racing in Ireland
- List of Irish National Hunt races
