= Forpadydeplasterer =

Irish-bred Thoroughbred racehorse

- Sire: Moscow Society
- Grandsire: Nijinsky
- Dam: Run Artiste
- Damsire: Deep Run
- Sex: Gelding
- Foaled: 2002
- Country: Ireland
- Colour: Bay
- Breeder: John Broderick
- Owner: Goat Racing Syndicate
- Trainer: Thomas Cooper
- Record: 32: 6-14-3
- Earnings: £471,862

Major wins
- Deloitte Novice Hurdle (2008); Arkle Challenge Trophy (2009)
- Last updated on 6 April 2013

Forpadydeplasterer (foaled 10 May 2002) is a Thoroughbred racehorse. In 2008 he won the Deloitte Novice Hurdle and the following year won the Arkle Challenge Trophy at the Cheltenham Festival. He also finished second to Big Zeb in the 2010 Queen Mother Champion Chase. Forpadydeplasterer ran in the 2013 Grand National, ridden by Andrew McNamara, but did not complete the course.
