= Racing Post Novice Chase =

Steeplechase horse race in Ireland

Racing Post Novice Chase
2025 (December)
Romeo Coolio	Irish Panther	July Flower

Previous years
2025 (January)
Ile Atlantique	Firefox	Inthepocket
2023
Found A Fifty	My Mate Mozzie	Sharjah
2022
Saint Roi	Visionarian	Fil Dor
2021
Ferny Hollow	Riviere D'etel	Coeur Sublime

2020-2011
2020
Franco De Port	Darver Star	Felix Desjy
2019
Notebook	Fakir D'Oudairies	Royal Rendezvous
2018
Le Richebourg	Us And Them	Voix Du Reve
2017
Footpad	Any Second Now	Jett
2016
Min	Ordinary World	Road To Respect
2015
Douvan	Sizing John	Velvet Maker
2014
Clarcam	Ted Veale	Vautour
2013
Defy Logic	Trifolium	Champagne Fever
2012
Arvika Ligeonniere	Oscars Well	Baily Green
2011
Blackstairmountain	Notus De La Tour	Foildubh

2010-2001
2010
Realt Dubh	Noble Prince	Torphichen
2009
Sizing Europe	Osana	Bobs Pride
2008
Follow The Plan	Tatenen	Cooldine
2007
Sky's The Limit	Lenrey	Scotsirish
2006
Schindlers Hunt	Hear The Echo	Blueberry Boy
2005
Missed That	Wild Passion	Kill Devil Hill
2004
Mariah Rollins	Steel Band	Ned Kelly
2003
Central House	Anxious Moments	Ricardo
2002
Le Coudray	Bust Out	Ricardo
2001
Moscow Flyer	Youlneverwalkalone	Colonel Yeager

2000-1991
2000
Knife Edge	Well Ridden	Balla Sola
1999
Native Upmanship	Slaney Native	Quinze
1998
His Song	Native Estates	Amberleigh House
1997
Dardjini	Magical Lady	Space Trucker
1996
Danoli	Land Afar	Beakstown
1994
Klairon Davis	Winter Belle	Sound Man
1993
Chirkpar	Brockley Court	Fabricator
1992
Soft Day	Commercial Artist	How's The Boss
1991
Valrodian	Mass Appeal	Joe's A Boy

1990-1987
1990
Firions Law	Redundant Pal	Joyful Noise
1989
Blitzkreig	The Committee	Toureen Prince
1988
Deep Idol	Tradehimin	Ballychorus Dream
1987
Abbey Glen	Wolf Of Badenoch	Bonalma

The Racing Post Novice Chase is a Grade 1 National Hunt chase in Ireland. The race is run at Leopardstown Racecourse in December, over a distance of 2 miles and 1 furlong (3,419 metres) and during its running there are 11 fences to be jumped.

In July 2025, Horse Racing Ireland announced that the race, which had been removed from the novice chase programme the previous season, would be reinstated at Leopardstown's Christmas meeting, with the Fort Leney Novice Chase deleted and the Faugheen Novice Chase at Limerick extended in distance.

The race is run on 26 December, which is known in Ireland as Saint Stephen's Day, and is one of the feature races of the course's four-day Christmas Festival.

Prior to 2011 it was titled the Bord Na Mona With Nature Novice Chase. Prior to 2009 it was titled the Durkan New Homes Novice Chase. During the 1990s the race was known as the Dennys Gold Medal Novice Chase.

== Records ==
Leading jockey (3 wins):

- Paul Townend - Blackstairmountain (2011), Arvika Ligeonniere (2012), Ferny Hollow (2021)
- Mark Walsh - Defy Logic (2013), Le Richebourg (2018), Saint Roi (2022)

Leading trainer (9 wins):

- Willie Mullins – Missed That (2005), Blackstairmountain (2011), Arvika Ligeonniere (2012), Douvan (2015), Min (2016), Footpad (2017), Franco De Port (2020), Ferny Hollow (2021), Saint Roi (2022)

== Winners since 1987 ==
Year	Winner	Age	Jockey	Trainer
1987	Abbey Glen	5	Frank Berry	P Hughes
1988	Deep Idol	8	Niall Madden	P D Osborne
1989	Blitzkrieg	6	T J Ryan	Edward O'Grady
1990	Firions Law	5	C N Bowens	Victor Bowens
1991	Valrodian	8	I Lawrence	Michael Robinson
1992	Soft Day	7	Tom Taaffe	Arthur Moore
1993	Chirkpar	6	Richard Dunwoody	Jim Bolger
1994	Klairon Davis	5	F Woods	Arthur Moore
1995	Cancelled due to frozen course
1996	Danoli	8	Tommy Treacy	Thomas Foley
1997	Dardjini	7	Kieran Gaule	Noel Meade
1998	His Song	5	Shay Barry	Mouse Morris
1999	Native Upmanship	6	Conor O'Dwyer	Arthur Moore
2000	Knife Edge	5	Tom Rudd	Michael O'Brien
2001	Moscow Flyer	7	Barry Geraghty	Jessica Harrington
2002	Le Coudray	8	Barry Geraghty	Christy Roche
2003	Central House	6	Paul Carberry	Dessie Hughes
2004	Mariah Rollins	6	John Cullen	Pat Fahy
2005	Missed That	6	David Casey	Willie Mullins
2006	Schindlers Hunt	6	Roger Loughran	Dessie Hughes
2007	Sky's The Limit	6	Andrew McNamara	Edward O'Grady
2008	Follow The Plan	5	John Cullen	Oliver McKiernan
2009	Sizing Europe	7	Andrew Lynch	Henry de Bromhead
2010	Realt Dubh	7	Paul Carberry	Noel Meade
2011	Blackstairmountain	6	Paul Townend	Willie Mullins
2012	Arvika Ligeonniere	7	Paul Townend	Willie Mullins
2013	Defy Logic	6	Mark Walsh	Paul Nolan
2014	Clarcam	4	Bryan Cooper	Gordon Elliott
2015	Douvan	5	Patrick Mullins (Note: amateur jockey)	Willie Mullins
2016	Min	5	Ruby Walsh	Willie Mullins
2017	Footpad	5	Ruby Walsh	Willie Mullins
2018	Le Richebourg	5	Mark Walsh	Joseph O'Brien
2019	Notebook	6	Rachael Blackmore	Henry de Bromhead
2020	Franco De Port	5	Bryan Cooper	Willie Mullins
2021	Ferny Hollow	6	Paul Townend	Willie Mullins
2022	Saint Roi	7	Mark Walsh	Willie Mullins
2023	Found A Fifty	6	Jack Kennedy	Gordon Elliott
2024	Croke Park	6	Sam Ewing	Gordon Elliott
2025	Romeo Coolio	6	Jack Kennedy	Gordon Elliott

== See also ==
- Horse racing in Ireland
- List of Irish National Hunt races
