= Champion INH Flat Race =

National Hunt flat horse race in Ireland

- Class: Grade 1
- Location: Punchestown; County Kildare, Ireland
- Race type: National Hunt flat race
- Sponsor: Race and Stay
- Website: Punchestown

Race information
- Distance: 2m ½f (3,219 metres)
- Surface: Turf
- Track: Right-handed
- Qualification: Four to seven years old geldings and mares
- Weight: 11 st 6 lb (4yo); 12 st 2 lb (5–7yo); Allowances; 7 lb for mares
- Purse: €100,000 (2021); 1st: €59,000

Champion I.N.H. Flat Race
2026
With Nolimit	The Mourne Rambler	Boycetown

Previous years
2025
Bambino Fever	Switch From Diesel	Colcannon
2024
Redemption Day	The Yellow Clay	William Munny
2023
A Dream To Share	Tullyhill	King Of Kingsfield
2022
Facile Vega	Redemption Day	American Mike
2021
Kilcruit	O'toole	Sir Gerhard

2020-2011
2019
Colreevy	Abacadabras	Beacon Edge
2018
Tornado Flyer	Blackbow	Carefully Selected
2017
Fayonagh	Paloma Blue	Poli Roi
2016
Blow By Blow	Moon Racer	Bacardys
2015
Bellshill	Disko	Modus
2014
Shaneshill	Silver Concorde	Value At Risk
2013
The Liquidator	Gilt Shadow	Apache Stronghold
2012
Champagne Fever	Melodic Rendezvous	Mozoltov
2011
Lovethehigherlaw	Waaheb	Jenari

2010-2003
2010
Hidden Universe	Oilily	Tornedo Shay
2009
Dunguib	Sweeps Hill	Luska Lad
2008
Cousin Vinny	Endless Intrigue	Academy Sir Harry
2007
Mick The Man	Woodbine Willie	Shirley Casper
2006
Leading Run	Hairy Molly	Lord Over
2005
Refinement	The Cool Guy	Nicanor
2004
Geill Sli	Blazing Liss	Augherskea
2003
Royal Rosa	Royal Alphabet	Kildare

The Champion INH Flat Race is a Grade 1 National Hunt flat race in Ireland for amateur riders which is open to racing horses aged four to seven years. It is run at Punchestown over a distance of about 2 miles and ½ furlong (2 miles and 70 yards, or 3,283 metres), and it is scheduled to take place each year during the Punchestown Festival in late April or early May.

The event was sponsored by the bookmaker Paddy Power from 1999 to 2011, by betchronicle.com in 2012, Betdaq in 2013, attheraces from 2014 to 2016 and the Racing Post from 2017 to 2019. The current sponsor is Race and Stay. It was formerly open to horses aged four or older, but an upper age limit of seven was introduced in 2007.

The field usually includes horses which ran previously in the Champion Bumper at Cheltenham, and both races were won by Cousin Vinny in 2008. The feat was repeated the following year by Dunguib, but he was later disqualified from the Irish version after testing positive for a banned substance. Three other horses have won both races; Fayonagh in 2017, Facile Vega in 2022 and A Dream To Share in 2023.

== Records ==
Leading jockey since 1992 (5 wins):

- Patrick Mullins - Cousin Vinny (2008), Lovethehigherlaw (2011), Champagne Fever (2012), Bellshill (2015), Facile Vega (2022)

Leading trainer since 1992 (13 wins):

- Willie Mullins - Maringo (1995), Cousin Vinny (2008), Lovethehigherlaw (2011), Champagne Fever (2012), Shaneshill (2014), Bellshill (2015), Blow By Blow (2016), Tornado Flyer (2018), Colreevy (2019), Kilcruit (2021), Facile Vega (2022), Redemption Day (2024), Bambino Fever (2025)

== Winners since 1992 ==
- All amateur jockeys.

Year	Winner	Age	Jockey	Trainer
1992	Tiananmen Square	4	Tim Hyde	Noel Meade
1993	Dramatic Touch	5	David Marnane	Liam Browne
1994	Aries Girl	5	Eoghan Norris	Patrick J. "Pat" Flynn
1995	Maringo	6	Tony Martin	Willie Mullins
1996	Noble Thyne	6	Tom Mullins	Paddy Mullins
1997	Arctic Camper	5	Robert Thornton	David Nicholson
1998	King's Road	5	Gordon Elliott	Nigel Twiston-Davies
1999	Our Bid	8	Philip Carberry	Kevin Prendergast
2000	Liss A Paoraigh	5	Paul Crowley	John Kiely
2001	Like-A-Butterfly (Note: The 2001 running took place at Leopardstown)	7	J. T. McNamara	Christy Roche
2002	Supreme Developer	5	Pat Murphy	Tony Mullins
2003	Royal Rosa	4	Aidan Fitzgerald	Nicky Henderson
2004	Geill Sli	6	Alan Crowe	Noel Meade
2005	Refinement	6	Alan Berry	Jonjo O'Neill
2006	Leading Run	7	Nina Carberry	Noel Meade
2007	Mick the Man	6	Nina Carberry	Noel Meade
2008	Cousin Vinny	5	Patrick Mullins	Willie Mullins
2009	Sweeps Hill (Note: Dunguib finished first in 2009, but he was subsequently disqualified after testing positive for a banned substance)	5	J. P. Magnier	John Kiely
2010	Hidden Universe	4	Robbie McNamara	Dermot Weld
2011	Lovethehigherlaw	5	Patrick Mullins	Willie Mullins
2012	Champagne Fever	5	Patrick Mullins	Willie Mullins
2013	The Liquidator	5	Jane Mangan	David Pipe
2014	Shaneshill	5	Jamie Codd	Willie Mullins
2015	Bellshill	5	Patrick Mullins	Willie Mullins
2016	Blow By Blow	5	Katie Walsh	Willie Mullins
2017	Fayonagh	6	Jamie Codd	Gordon Elliott
2018	Tornado Flyer	5	Richie Deegan	Willie Mullins
2019	Colreevy	6	Jamie Codd	Willie Mullins
	no race 2020 (Note: The 2020 running was cancelled because of the COVID-19 pandemic in the Republic of Ireland)
2021	Kilcruit	6	Derek O'Connor	Willie Mullins
2022	Facile Vega	5	Patrick Mullins	Willie Mullins
2023	A Dream To Share	5	John Gleeson	John Kiely
2024	Redemption Day	7	Jody Townend	Willie Mullins
2025	Bambino Fever	5	Jody Townend	Willie Mullins
2026	With Nolimit	5	Josh Halford	Gordon Elliott

== See also ==
- Horse racing in Ireland
- List of Irish National Hunt races
