= Dessie Hughes =

Irish racehorse trainer

Personal information
- Born: Ireland
- Died: 16 November 2014 (aged 71)
- Occupation: Trainer

Horse racing career
- Sport: Horse racing

Major racing wins
- Champion Chase, Champion Hurdle, Cheltenham Gold Cup

Significant horses
- Davy Lad, Hardy Eustace, Monksfield

Dessie Hughes was an Irish racehorse trainer and jockey. He was the father of British champion jockey, Richard Hughes, and won at the Cheltenham Festival as both jockey and trainer.

== Career ==
=== As a jockey ===
Hughes' most famous successes in the saddle came at the Cheltenham Festival. In 1977, he partnered the Mick O'Toole-trained Davy Lad to success in the Cheltenham Gold Cup. Two years later, he was victorious in one of the most famous clashes in jumps racing history when Monksfield rode to a famous victory over Sea Pigeon in the Champion Hurdle.

=== As a trainer ===
Hughes had always planned to train and having prepared for three years, he took out his training licence in 1980. Light The Wad was an early success for the fledgling yard, winning the Irish Arkle at Leopardstown in 1982 and successive renewals of the Drogheda Chase at the Punchestown Festival in 1981 and 1982.

That same year, 1982, he sent out Miller Hill to win the Supreme Novices' Hurdle at the Cheltenham Festival.

Other notable wins in the 1980s included Chow Mein in the 1985 Galway Plate, William Crump in the 1986 Huzzar Handicap Hurdle, Ryan Merrifield in 1987, and Ballychorus Dream in the 1988 Drinmore Novice Chase.

For a long time around the turn of the decade, a persistent bug plagued the yard and success was hard to come by.

Major success returned with Guest Performance who won six hurdle races between February 1996 and January 1997, before winning the Grade 3 Nas Na Riogh Novice Chase at Naas in 1998. Hughes won the race again with Colonel Braxton in 2002, a horse which had also won the Grade 1 Menolly Homes Champion Novice Hurdle.

Hughes' most famous recruit, Hardy Eustace, was picked up for a mere IR£21,000 in 2001, yet went on to win at the very highest level. In his novice hurdle season, he won the Grade 1 Royal Bond Novice Hurdle and the Sun Alliance Hurdle at the Cheltenham Festival. The horse went on to win the 2004 and 2005 Champion Hurdles and the Punchestown equivalent in 2004. Success also came in the Irish Champion Hurdle in 2007. By the time he retired at the end of the 2009/10 season, he had earned well over €1,000,000 in prize money.

Bought at the same sale as Hardy Eustace for a similar sum, Central House was almost as successful, winning five Grade 2 contests, one Grade 1 and being placed in seven other Graded chases, accumulating just over €515,000 in prize money during his career.

Other Graded race winners have included Schindlers Hunt, Grangeclare Lark and Grand National performers Rare Bob, Black Apalachi and Vic Venturi.

Former apprentice of Hughes', Pat Dobbs spoke highly of his time with the yard. “Dessie did more work around the yard than most of us lads. He was first out every morning and used to muck out just across from me, telling me to hurry up when I was too slow. He was a great horseman and paid attention to every detail.”

== Principal jockeys ==
- Bryan Cooper
- Roger Loughran
- Ian McCarthy
- Mark Enright
- Pat Dobbs

== Major wins ==
=== As a jockey ===
(United Kingdom) Great Britain

- Aintree Hurdle – (3) – Monksfield (1977 (dead heat), 1978, 1979)
- Arkle Chase – Tip the Wink (1977)Chinrullah (1979)
- Champion Chase – Chinrullah (1980) (subsequently disqualified)
- Champion Hurdle – Monksfield (1979)
- Cheltenham Gold Cup – Davy Lad (1977)
- Sun Alliance Hurdle – (2) – Davy Lad (1975), Parkhill (1976)
- Supreme Novices' Hurdle – Mac's Chariot (1977)
- Stayers' Hurdle – Bit Of A Jig (1976)

=== As a trainer ===
(United Kingdom) Great Britain

- Champion Hurdle – (2) – Hardy Eustace (2004, 2005)
- Sun Alliance Hurdle – Hardy Eustace (2003)
- Supreme Novices' Hurdle – Miller Hill (1982)
- Triumph Hurdle – Our Conor (2013)

(Republic of Ireland) Ireland

- Arkle Novice Chase – (2) Light The Wad (1981) Schindler's Hunt (2007)
- Irish Champion Hurdle – Hardy Eustace (2007)
- Racing Post Novice Chase – (2) – Central House (2002), Schindler's Hunt (2006)
- Irish Grand National – Timbera (2003)
- Spring Juvenile Hurdle -(3) – Mutineer (2003), Our Conor (2013), Guitar Pete (2014)
- Growise Champion Novice Chase – Rare Bob (2009)
- Punchestown Champion Hurdle – Hardy Eustace (2004)
- Morgiana Hurdle – Hardy Eustace (2008)
- Royal Bond Novice Hurdle -Hardy Eustace (2002)
