= Hardy Eustace =

Irish-bred Thoroughbred racehorse (1997–2024)

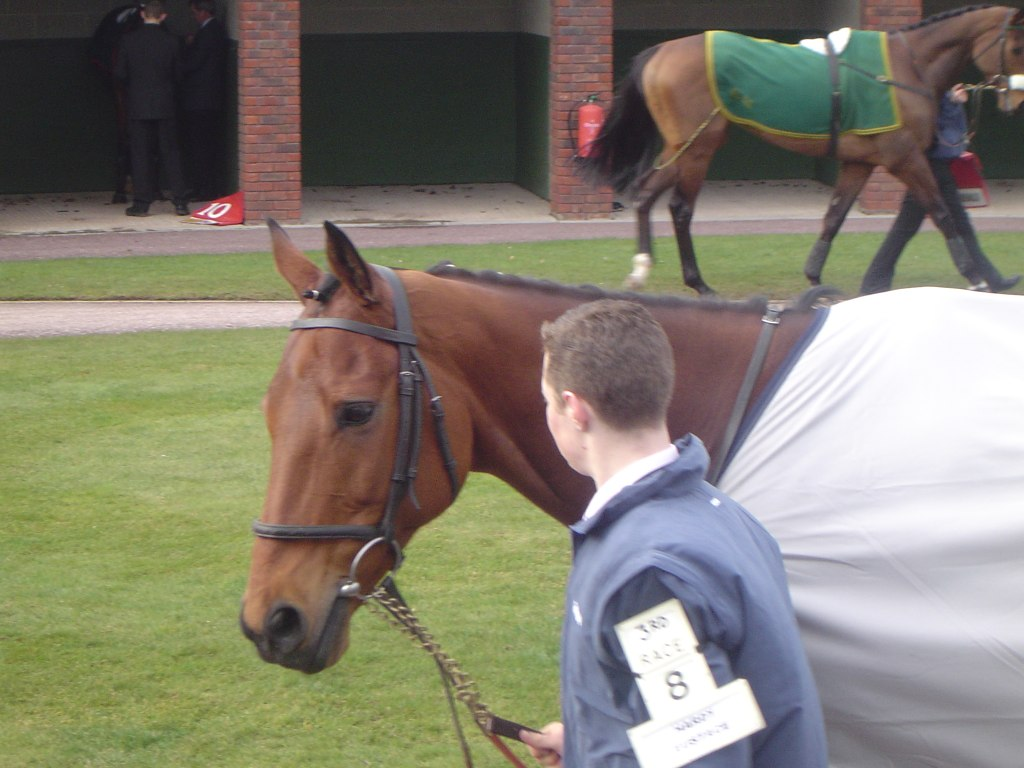
- Hardy Eustace at the Cheltenham Festival in 2005.
- Sire: Archway
- Dam: Sterna Star
- Damsire: Corvara
- Sex: Gelded male (Gelding)
- Foaled: 5 April 1997
- Died: 4 February 2024 (aged 26)
- Country: Ireland
- Colour: Bay
- Breeder: Patrick Joyce
- Owner: Laurence Byrne
- Trainer: Dessie Hughes
- Record: 41: 14-11-6
- Earnings: £1,088,213

Major wins
- Goffs Land Rover Bumper (2002); Royal Bond Novice Hurdle (2002); Royal & SunAlliance Novices' Hurdle (2003); Champion Hurdle (2004, 2005); Punchestown Champion Hurdle (2004); Red Mills Trial Hurdle (2005); Ascot Hurdle (2006, 2007); Irish Champion Hurdle (2007); Morgiana Hurdle (2008)

Hardy Eustace (5 April 1997 – 4 February 2024) was an Irish-bred Thoroughbred racehorse, best known for winning the Champion Hurdle in 2004 and 2005. He was trained in Ireland by Dessie Hughes and owned by Laurence Byrne.

== Early career ==
Hardy Eustace made his debut in a National Hunt flat race at Punchestown in March 2002, where he finished an eleven-length fifth of seventeen runners. He improved for his debut run in his next start as he won the valuable Goffs Land Rover Bumper at Fairyhouse in April. He had one more run in his debut season, where he finished sixth in the Grade 1 Champion INH Flat Race at Punchestown.

Hardy Eustace began the 2002/03 season with a warm-up run in a flat race at Navan, where he finished fifth. In his next race, which was his first over hurdles, he finished first in a maiden hurdle at Punchestown but was disqualified. He was moved to Grade 1 class for his next start in the Royal Bond Novice Hurdle, which he won by one and a half lengths from Back In Front. He then won another novice hurdle before finishing second to Solerina in the Deloitte & Touche Novice Hurdle. He then went to the Cheltenham Festival in March 2003, where he won the Royal & SunAlliance Novices' Hurdle under Kieran Kelly. Hardy Eustace had one more run that season, where he finished fifth behind Iris's Gift in the Sefton Novices' Hurdle.

== Champion Hurdler ==
Hardy Eustace began the 2003/04 season with a warm-up run on the flat at Navan again, which he won. He then finished 2nd behind Rosaker in the Lismullen Hurdle at Navan before finishing last in the December Festival Hurdle. He next finished runner-up in both Cleeve Hurdle and the Red Mills Trial Hurdle. After this, Hardy Eustace came back to Cheltenham for the Champion Hurdle, for which he was sent off a 33/1 chance. However, he belied his long odds and won the race with a front-running performance, with Rooster Booster back in second. He followed that up with another victory over Rooster Booster in the Punchestown Champion Hurdle, which was his last run for the season.

The following season (2004/05), Hardy Eustace was placed in his first 3 runs of the season: the Tara Hurdle, December Festival Hurdle and the AIG Europe Champion Hurdle. He then went to Gowran Park to win the Red Mills Trial Hurdle before coming back to Cheltenham for the Champion Hurdle again, where he was sent off the 7/2 joint favourite. He led throughout the race and held off a challenge from Harchibald to win by a neck.

== Later career ==
The 2005/06 season began with a comfortable success for Hardy Eustace at Punchestown, where he returned at odds of 1/8. He then disappointed in the AIG Europe Champion Hurdle, where he finished last of seven runners behind the winner, Brave Inca. After that he came back to Cheltenham, where he was looking to win the Champion Hurdle for the 3rd year running, but was third behind Brave Inca. He had two more runs that season, finishing second in the Aintree Hurdle and third in the Punchestown Champion Hurdle.

Hardy Eustace started the 2006/07 season with his usual warm-up run on the flat, where he finished sixth in a Curragh Handicap. He then won the Ascot Hurdle, before finishing second to Detroit City in the Bula Hurdle. He then went back to Leopardstown, where he won the AIG Europe Champion Hurdle. He had two more runs that season but failed to win, finishing fourth in the Champion Hurdle at Cheltenham and third in the Punchestown Champion Hurdle.

The following season (2007/08), Hardy Eustace started with his customary warm-up run on the flat before he won the Ascot Hurdle again, beating Afsoun. He was then stepped up 3 miles plus for the first time in the Long Walk Hurdle and finished second to Lough Derg. He was second his next two starts: the December Festival Hurdle and the AIG Europe Champion Hurdle. Hardy Eustace returned to Cheltenham to compete in the World Hurdle, where he was twelfth behind reigning champion Inglis Drever.

In his first race in the 2008/09 season, Hardy Eustace started in the Grade 1 Maplewood Developments Hurdle, where he was sent off the 14/1 outsider of four runners but recorded a two-and-a-half-length victory over Sizing Europe. He followed that with a third behind Catch Me in the Hatton's Grace Hurdle at the end of November at Fairyhouse.

Hardy Eustace was retired to the Irish National Stud at the end of 2009. He died on 4 February 2024, at the age of 27.

== Pedigree ==
Pedigree of Hardy Eustace (IRE), bay Gelding, 1997
| Sire Archway (IRE) 1988 | Thatching (IRE); 1975 | Thatch | Forli |
| Sire Archway (IRE) 1988 | Thatching (IRE); 1975 | Thatch | Thong |
| Sire Archway (IRE) 1988 | Thatching (IRE); 1975 | Abella | Abbernant |
| Sire Archway (IRE) 1988 | Thatching (IRE); 1975 | Abella | Darrica |
| Sire Archway (IRE) 1988 | Rose of Jericho; 1984 | Alleged | Hoist The Flag |
| Sire Archway (IRE) 1988 | Rose of Jericho; 1984 | Alleged | Princess Pout |
| Sire Archway (IRE) 1988 | Rose of Jericho; 1984 | Rose Red | Northern Dancer |
| Sire Archway (IRE) 1988 | Rose of Jericho; 1984 | Rose Red | Cambrienne |
| Dam Sterna Star (IRE) 1984 | Corvaro; 1977 | Vaguely Noble | Vienna |
| Dam Sterna Star (IRE) 1984 | Corvaro; 1977 | Vaguely Noble | Noble Lassie |
| Dam Sterna Star (IRE) 1984 | Corvaro; 1977 | Delmora | Sir Gaylord |
| Dam Sterna Star (IRE) 1984 | Corvaro; 1977 | Delmora | Penitence III |
| Dam Sterna Star (IRE) 1984 | Star Girl; 1973 | Sovereign Gleam | Sovereign Path |
| Dam Sterna Star (IRE) 1984 | Star Girl; 1973 | Sovereign Gleam | Tudor Gleam |
| Dam Sterna Star (IRE) 1984 | Star Girl; 1973 | Stema (GER) | Neckar (GER) |
| Dam Sterna Star (IRE) 1984 | Star Girl; 1973 | Stema (GER) | Stammarsart (GER) |
