= Ruby Walsh =

Irish jockey (born 1979)

- Ruby Walsh, Cheltenham 2005

Personal information
- Born: 14 May 1979 (age 47) Kill, County Kildare, Ireland
- Occupation: Former jump jockey

Horse racing career
- Sport: Horse racing
- Career wins: 2756

Racing awards
- Irish National Hunt champion jockey in 1998/99, 2000/01, 2004/05, 2005/06, 2006/07, 2007/08, 2008/09, 2009/10, 2013/14, 2014/15, 2015/16 & 2016/17 Leading jockey at the Cheltenham Festival in 2004, 2006, 2008, 2009, 2010, 2011, 2013, 2014, 2015, 2016 & 2017 Recipient of the Horse Racing Ireland National Hunt award in 2004, 2005, 2006, 2007 & 2008 Recipient of the International Jockey of the Year Lester Award in 2007, 2008 & 2010

Significant horses
- Big Buck's, Hurricane Fly, Kauto Star, Annie Power, Douvan, Commanche Court, Papillon, Vautour, Faugheen

Rupert "Ruby" Walsh (born 14 May 1979) is an Irish former jockey. He is the second child, and eldest son, of former champion amateur jockey Ted Walsh and his wife Helen. Widely regarded as one of the greatest National Hunt jockeys of all time, Walsh is the third most prolific winner in British and Irish jump racing history behind only Sir Anthony McCoy and Richard Johnson.

== Career ==
Showing talent from an early age, Walsh won the Irish amateur title twice, in 1996/97 (aged 18) and 1997/98, before turning professional. He won the English Grand National in 2000 at his first attempt, aged 20, on Papillon, a horse trained by his father and owned by Mrs J Maxwell Moran. Father and son then went on to win the Irish Grand National with Commanche Court the same year. In the 2004/05 season Walsh won three of the four Nationals: the Irish on the 2006 Grand National winner, Numbersixvalverde, the Welsh on subsequent 2007 Grand National winner Silver Birch, and the English on Hedgehunter. He rode Cornish Rebel in the Scottish, but was beaten a short head by Joe's Edge. However, he had earlier success in that race on Take Control in 2002 and following the retirement in 2015 of Tony McCoy, became the only jockey then riding to have won all four Nationals. Walsh has one of the best Grand National records amongst contemporary jockeys, having won the race twice (2000, 2005), finished second once (2006), third once (2009), and fourth twice (2001, 2002). Walsh has suffered a number of serious injuries, the worst of which was a broken leg sustained in 1999 at Pardubice in the Czech Republic.

During his career Walsh rode more than 2,500 winners, including 59 at the Cheltenham Festival, since his first win in 1998 on Alexander Banquet. These include the 2004 Queen Mother Champion Chase on Azertyuiop, the 2007 and 2009 Cheltenham Gold Cup on the favourite, Kauto Star and two subsequent Champion Chase successes in 2008 and 2009 on the brilliant Master Minded. He also won both the 2006 Tingle Creek Chase and the King George VI Chase on Kauto Star. He repeated the King George feat, again on Kauto Star, in 2007 (just days after returning from injury), 2008, and 2009 when Kauto Star won impressively by 36 lengths. He reclaimed the King George VI Chase in 2011 on board Kauto Star after Long Run won the race in 2010. He won the Hennessy Gold Cup twice, in 2003 on Strong Flow, and 2009 with Denman. He also won the Whitbread Gold Cup twice, in 2001 and 2003 (the latter when it was run as the Attheraces Gold Cup), both times on Ad Hoc. In 2007, Walsh won the inaugural British Horseracing Board Jockeys' Order of Merit award.

Walsh was Irish jump jockey champion twelve times – 1998/99, 2000/01, 2004/05, 2005/06, 2006/07, 2007/08, 2008/09, 2009/10, 2013/14, 2014/15, 2015/16 and 2016/17. His dominance of the jockeys' championship in Ireland was all the more remarkable inasmuch as for a period of more than ten years he had a unique riding arrangement with two powerful stables, one on either side of the Irish Sea. Based in Calverstown, County Kildare, where he lives with his wife Gillian, he rode predominantly for Willie Mullins in Ireland. Previously he also spent a substantial proportion of his time riding in England for Somerset-based champion trainer Paul Nicholls, the former trainer of Kauto Star. Walsh also took the occasional ride for his father, Ted, and a variety of other Irish trainers.

In January 2007, Walsh achieved the fastest-ever century of winners in Irish jumps racing history aboard Bluestone Lad at Gowran Park. He ended the 2006/07 season with a combined total in Ireland and the UK of 198 winners, more than any other jockey from either country that year. (This total was later increased to 200 on the disqualification of two horses for positive tests to banned substances. In both instances, Walsh had ridden the subsequently-promoted runners-up.) He repeated this feat in 2007/08, riding his 200th winner on Andreas at Sandown on his penultimate ride of the season. He rode his 1,000th Irish winner, Rare Article, at Sligo in May 2008.

At the 2009 Cheltenham Festival Walsh rode a record-breaking seven winners over the four days. He equalled that record at the 2016 Cheltenham Festival. On the second day of the 2010 festival he rode Sanctuaire to victory in the Fred Winter Juvenile Novices Handicap Hurdle, thereby becoming the jockey with the most wins in the history of the Festival.

In March 2011, Walsh rode Hurricane Fly to victory in the Champion Hurdle at Cheltenham, finishing ahead of Peddlers Cross and Oscar Whisky. It was Walsh's first victory in the feature race of the opening day.

He won his 2,500th race on Au Quart De Tour at Gowran Park on 20 January 2016.

As of 2019, Walsh remained the Festival's most successful rider and won the leading rider's award eleven times within a fourteen-year span. In August 2015 Walsh won the Australian Grand National on Bashboy.

On 1 May 2019, Walsh announced his retirement from racing with immediate effect after a career spanning 24 years. The announcement was made after he rode Kemboy to victory in the Punchestown Gold Cup. It was the 213th Grade One win for Walsh.

=== Statistics ===
Cheltenham Festival winners (59)
Year	Race	Mount
1998	Champion Bumper	Alexander Banquet
2002	Mildmay of Flete Handicap Chase	Blowing Wind
2003	Arkle Challenge Trophy	Azertyuiop
2004	Queen Mother Champion Chase	Azertyuiop
2004	Grand Annual Chase	St Pirran
2004	County Hurdle	Sporazene
2005	Champion Bumper	Missed That
2005	Daily Telegraph Chase	Thisthatandtother
2006	Supreme Novices' Hurdle	Noland
2006	William Hill Trophy	Dun Doire
2006	County Hurdle	Desert Quest
2007	Royal & SunAlliance Chase	Denman
2007	Ryanair Chase	Taranis
2007	Cheltenham Gold Cup	Kauto Star
2008	Queen Mother Champion Chase	Master Minded
2008	Ballymore Properties Novices' Hurdle	Fiveforthree
2008	Triumph Hurdle	Celestial Halo
2009	David Nicholson Mares' Hurdle	Quevega
2009	Queen Mother Champion Chase	Master Minded
2009	World Hurdle	Big Buck's
2009	Ballymore Properties Novices' Hurdle	Mikael d'Haguenet
2009	RSA Chase	Cooldine
2009	Vincent O'Brien County Handicap Hurdle	American Trilogy
2009	Cheltenham Gold Cup	Kauto Star
2010	David Nicholson Mares' Hurdle	Quevega
2010	Fred Winter Juvenile Novices' Handicap Hurdle	Sanctuaire
2010	World Hurdle	Big Buck's
2011	Stan James Supreme Novices' Hurdle	Al Ferof
2011	Stan James Champion Hurdle	Hurricane Fly
2011	David Nicholson Mares' Hurdle	Quevega
2011	World Hurdle	Big Buck's
2011	Vincent O'Brien County Handicap Hurdle	Final Approach
2012	World Hurdle	Big Buck's
2012	David Nicholson Mares' Hurdle	Quevega
2013	Stan James Supreme Novices' Hurdle	Champagne Fever
2013	Stan James Champion Hurdle	Hurricane Fly
2013	David Nicholson Mares' Hurdle	Quevega
2013	Champion Bumper	Briar Hill
2014	Supreme Novices' Hurdle	Vautour
2014	David Nicholson Mares' Hurdle	Quevega
2014	Neptune Investment Management Novices' Hurdle	Faugheen
2015	Supreme Novices' Hurdle	Douvan
2015	Arkle Challenge Trophy	Un de Sceaux
2015	Champion Hurdle	Faugheen
2015	JLT Novices' Chase	Vautour
2016	Arkle Challenge Trophy	Douvan
2016	Champion Hurdle	Annie Power
2016	David Nicholson Mares' Hurdle	Vroum Vroum Mag
2016	Baring Bingham Novices' Hurdle	Yorkhill
2016	JLT Novices' Chase	Black Hercules
2016	Ryanair Chase	Vautour
2016	Dawn Run Mares' Novices' Hurdle	Limini
2017	JLT Novices' Chase	Yorkhill
2017	Ryanair Chase	Un de Sceaux
2017	Stayers' Hurdle	Nichols Canyon
2017	Dawn Run Mares' Novices' Hurdle	Let's Dance
2018	Arkle Challenge Trophy	Footpad
2018	David Nicholson Mares' Hurdle	Benie Des Dieux
2019	Supreme Novices' Hurdle	Klassical Dream

He was the leading jockey at the Festival 11 times: 2004, 2006, 2008, 2009, 2010, 2011, 2013, 2014, 2015, 2016 and 2017.

Irish Jump Racing wins season by season

Season	Runs	Wins	Win %
1994/95	3	0	0
1995/96	77	8	10
1996/97	184	30	16
1997/98	230	41	18
1998/99	503	95	19
1999/00	239	33	14
2000/01	480	84	18
2001/02	444	84	19
2002/03	488	78	16
2003/04	360	70	19
2004/05	527	111	21
2005/06	422	90	21
2006/07	562	125	22
2007/08	547	131	24
2008/09	512	121	24
2009/10	424	128	25
2010/11	192	45	23
2011/12	358	85	24
2012/13	340	101	30
2013/14	403	122	30
2014/15	253	79	31
2015/16	350	105	30
2016/17	371	131	35

GB Jump Racing wins season by season

Season	Runs	Wins	Win %
1997/98	14	2	14
1998/99	13	1	8
1999/00	8	1	13
2000/01	18	5	28
2001/02	68	13	19
2002/03	295	76	26
2003/04	294	62	29
2004/05	311	81	26
2005/06	236	69	29
2006/07	291	75	26
2007/08	229	69	30
2008/09	252	69	27
2009/10	234	69	29
2010/11	106	26	25
2011/12	221	55	25
2012/13	211	57	27
2013/14	25	7	28
2014/15	56	13	23
2015/16	45	14	31
2016/17	24	6	25

== Injuries ==
Like many jump jockeys, Walsh has suffered a number of serious injuries, the worst of which was a broken leg sustained in 1999 at Pardubice in the Czech Republic, a course he was visiting to compete in the famous Great Pardubice Steeplechase. He later broke the same leg while schooling a horse and was out of action for a total of five months that season, but recovered in time to partner Papillon to win his first Grand National.

Walsh has also fractured his wrist twice, dislocated one hip and fractured the other, cracked his elbow, dislocated both shoulders and suffered cracked and badly bruised vertebrae. A fall at the Paddy Power meeting at Cheltenham in November 2008 resulted in Walsh having his spleen removed in an emergency operation. He returned to the saddle just 27 days later.

Walsh fractured his left ankle during a fall from the ill-fated Imperial Hills, trained by Willie Mullins at Killarney in May 2009. During his time off he was present to saddle Sesenta for Willie Mullins in the Ascot Stakes at Royal Ascot.

During the run-up to the 2010 Grand National he broke his left arm after a fall from Celestial Halo. His horse fell and they both seemed to have got away unscathed, but a horse racing behind them landed on his arm while he was on the ground, breaking it in two places. Walsh suffered an injury in the same race in 2012 after a fall from Zarkander which ruled him out of the 2012 Grand National.

On the last day of the 2014 Cheltenham Festival Walsh sustained a compound fracture of the humerus in a fall in the Triumph Hurdle.

On the day before the 2016 Grand National Walsh fractured his wrist after falling in the Topham chase on Blood Cotil.

On 18 November 2017 Walsh fractured his right leg in a fall at Punchestown and did not return until 3 March 2018. On day two of the 2018 Cheltenham Festival Walsh aggravated his late 2017 injury.

== Trainer split ==
In May 2013 it was announced that Walsh and Paul Nicholls were to split following Walsh's decision to spend more time in Ireland with his young family. However they parted on good terms and Walsh continued to ride the occasional Nicholls horse, including winning on Al Ferof in the Grade 2 Amlin Chase at Ascot in November 2014.

== Personal life ==
Walsh married Gillian Doran in July 2006. Their first child, Isabelle, was born in October 2009. The couple have gone on to have three more daughters, Elsa, Gemma and Erica.

- His sister Katie Walsh is also one of the top female jockeys.
- His brother Ted Walsh Junior is married to female jockey Nina Carberry.

== Popular culture ==
Walsh is mentioned in a song by the famous singer/songwriter Christy Moore called "The Ballad of Ruby Walsh," which appears on his album "Listen." The song is based on Christy's real life experience of watching the jockey at the Galway races.

== Television ==
Walsh featured in a TG4 documentary called "Jump Boys". It followed the journeys of Walsh, Barry Geraghty and Davy Russell over the course of the 2011/12 season. It aired on 28 November 2012. He has also occasionally worked as a racing pundit for RTÉ while injured and has appeared on the Channel 4 Racing Saturday morning programme The Morning Line on a number of occasions. Walsh has also featured in a number of well received commercials for the bookmaker Paddy Power, in particular a recent commercial prior to the Cheltenham Festival 2016 where he confronts an angry Twitter troll and allegations that jockeys intentionally throw themselves off their horses.

== Major wins ==
(Republic of Ireland) Ireland

- Irish Gold Cup -(2) Quel Esprit (2012), Bellshill (2019)
- Lexus Chase -(3) Rince Ri (2000), Denman (2007), Tidal Bay (2012)
- Punchestown Gold Cup -(7) Imperial Call (1999), Commanche Court (2000), Neptune Collonges (2007, 2008), Boston Bob (2014), Kemboy (2019)
- Ladbrokes Champion Chase -(4) Taranis (2007), Kauto Star (2008, 2010), Valseur Lido (2016)
- John Durkan Memorial Chase-(3) Arvika Ligeonniere (2013), Djakadam (2015, 2016)
- Ryanair Gold Cup -(3) Rince Ri (1999), Big-and-Bold (2002), Voix Du Reve (2019)
- Drinmore Novice Chase -(4) Promalee (1998), Nil Desperandum (2003), Bog Warrior (2011), Arvika Ligeonniere (2012)
- Racing Post Novice Chase -(1) Min (2016)
- Fort Leney Novice Chase -(1) Back in Focus (2012)
- Paddy Power Dial-A-Bet Chase -(3) Papillon (1998, 2000), Douvan (2016)
- Arkle Novice Chase -(3) Assessed (2002), Un de Sceaux (2015), Douvan (2016)
- Dr P. J. Moriarty Novice Chase -(3) J'y Vole (2008), Cooldine (2009), Ballycasey (2014)
- Ryanair Novice Chase -(4) Le Roi Miguel (2003), Arvika Ligeonniere (2013), Un De Sceaux (2015), Douvan (2016)
- Punchestown Champion Chase -(3) Micko's Dream (2001), Twist Magic (2008), Master Minded (2009)
- Morgiana Hurdle -(6) Thousand Stars (2011), Hurricane Fly (2012, 2013, 2014), Nichols Canyon (2015, 2016)
- Royal Bond Novice Hurdle -(4) Alexander Banquet (1998), Sous les Cieux (2011), Long Dog (2015), Quick Grabim (2018)
- Hatton's Grace Hurdle -(2) Zaidpour (2012), Arctic Fire (2015)
- Future Champions Novice Hurdle-(2) Solerina (2002), Long Dog (2015)
- Christmas Hurdle -(3) Commanche Court (1998), Zaidpour (2013), Vroum Vroum Mag (2016)
- December Festival Hurdle -(4) Hurricane Fly (2012, 2013, 2014), Nichols Canyon (2015)
- Slaney Novice Hurdle -(4) Homer Wells (2005), Mikael D'haguenet (2009), Briar Hill (2014), Bellshill (2016)
- Irish Champion Hurdle -(6) Brave Inca (2009), Hurricane Fly (2012, 2013, 2014, 2015), Faugheen (2016)
- Deloitte Novice Hurdle -(3) Alexander Banquet (1999), Vautour (2014), Nichols Canyon (2015)
- Mares Novice Hurdle Championship Final -(2) Nobody Told Me (2003), Annie Power (2013)
- Herald Champion Novice Hurdle -(4) Iktitaf (2006), Hurricane Fly (2009), Faugheen (2014), Douvan (2015)
- Champion Stayers Hurdle -(5) Asian Maze (2006), Fiveforthree (2009), Quevega (2011, 2012, 2013)
- Punchestown Champion Hurdle -(6) Davenport Milenium (2002), Hurricane Fly (2011, 2012, 2013), Faugheen (2015), Vroum Vroum Mag (2016)
- Tattersalls Ireland Champion Novice Hurdle -(8) Davenport Milenium (2002), Nobody Told Me (2003), Sadlers Wings (2004), Nicanor (2006), Glencove Marina (2007), Mikael d'Haguenet (2009), Vautour (2014), Nichols Canyon (2015)
- Champion Four Year Old Hurdle -(5) Holy Orders (2001), Sporazene (2003), Diakali (2013), Abbyssial (2014), Bapaume (2017)
- Irish Daily Mirror Novice Hurdle -(1) Bellshill (2016)
- Mares Champion Hurdle -(2) Annie Power (2014, 2015)

(United Kingdom) Great Britain

- Betfair Chase -(4) Kauto Star (2006, 2009, 2011), Silviniaco Conti (2012)
- Henry VIII Novices' Chase -(2) Thisthatandtother (2003), Al Ferof (2011)
- Tingle Creek Chase -(3) Cenkos (2002), Kauto Star (2006), Un de Sceaux (2016)
- Long Walk Hurdle -(2) Big Buck's (2009, 2011),
- Kauto Star Novices' Chase -(2) Strong Flow (2003), Breedsbreeze (2008),
- Christmas Hurdle -(3) Feathard Lady (2005), Faugheen (2014, 2015)
- King George VI Chase -(5) Kauto Star (2006, 2007, 2008, 2009, 2011)
- Challow Novices' Hurdle -(2) Cornish Rebel (2003), Denman (2006)
- Tolworth Hurdle -(3) Silverburn (2007), Breedsbreeze (2008), Yorkhill (2016)
- Clarence House Chase -(4) Master Minded (2009), Twist Magic (2010) Un de Sceaux (2016, 2017)
- Scilly Isles Novices' Chase -(2) New Little Bric (2007), Herecomesthetruth (2009)
- Ascot Chase -(1) Kauto Star (2008)
- Top Novices' Hurdle -(1) Pierrot Lunaire (2008)
- Manifesto Novices' Chase -(1) Clarcam (2015)
- Anniversary 4-Y-O Novices' Hurdle -(2) Le Duc (2003), Zarkandar (2011)
- Betway Bowl -(2) What a Friend (2010), Kemboy (2019)
- Aintree Hurdle -(5) Ilnamar (2002), Sacundai (2003), Asian Maze (2006), Zarkandar (2013), Annie Power (2016)
- Mildmay Novices' Chase -(2) Big Buck's (2008), Silviniaco Conti (2012)
- Mersey Novices' Hurdle -(4) Garde Champetre (2004), Natal (2006), Elusive Dream (2008), Nichols Canyon (2015)
- Melling Chase -(3) Fadalko (2001), Master Minded (2011), Min (2019)
- Sefton Novices' Hurdle -(1) Asian Maze (2005)
- Liverpool Hurdle -(4) Big Buck's (2009, 2010, 2011, 2012)
- Maghull Novices' Chase -(3) Le Roi Miguel (2003), Twist Magic (2007), Tataniano (2010)
- Celebration Chase -(2) Andreas (2008), Twist Magic (2009)

France

- Grande Course de Haies d'Auteuil -(2) Thousand Stars (2011, 2012)
- Prix Alain du Breil -(3) Strangely Brown (2005), Diakali (2013), Footpad (2016)
- Grand Prix d'Automne -(1) Thousand Stars (2015)

Australia

- Ecycle Solutions Grand National Steeplechase -(1) Bashboy (2015)

United States

- Grand National Hurdle Stakes -(1) Rawnaq (2016)

Japan

- Nakayama Grand Jump -(1) Blackstairmountain (2013)
