= Champion Bumper =

National Hunt flat horse race in Britain

- Class: Grade 1
- Location: Cheltenham Racecourse; Cheltenham, England
- Inaugurated: 1992
- Race type: National Hunt flat race
- Sponsor: Weatherbys
- Website: Cheltenham

Race information
- Distance: 2m 87y (3,298 metres)
- Surface: Turf
- Track: Left-handed
- Qualification: Four to six years old
- Weight: 10 st 11 lb (4yo); 11 st 7 lb (5–6yo); Allowances; 7 lb for fillies and mares
- Purse: £80,000 (2025); 1st: £45,560

Champion Bumper
2026
The Mourne Rambler	Mets Ta Ceinture	Bass Hunter

Previous years
2025
Bambino Fever	Heads Up	Shuttle Diplomacy
2024
Jasmin De Vaux	Romeo Coolio	Jalon D'oudairies
2023
A Dream To Share	Fact To File	Captain Teague
2022
Facile Vega	American Mike	James's Gate
2021
Sir Gerhard	Kilcruit	Elle Est Belle

2020-2011
2020
Ferny Hollow	Appreciate It	Queens Brook
2019
Envoi Allen	Blue Sari	Thyme Hill
2018
Relegate	Carefully Selected	Tornado Flyer
2017
Fayonagh	Debuchet	Claimantakinforgan
2016
Ballyandy	Battleford	Bacardys
2015
Moon Racer	Modus	Wait For Me
2014
Silver Concorde	Shaneshill	Joshua Lane
2013
Briar Hill	Regal Encore	Golantilla
2012
Champagne Fever	New Year's Eve	Pique Sous
2011
Cheltenian	Destroyer Deployed	Aupcharlie

2010-2001
2010
Cue Card	Al Ferof	Frawley
2009
Dunguib	Some Present	Rite of Passage
2008
Cousin Vinny	Corskeagh Royale	Zaarito
2007
Cork All Star	Sophocles	Aranleigh
2006
Hairy Molly	Pressgang	Kicks For Free
2005
Missed That	De Soto	Rasharrow
2004
Total Enjoyment	Refinement	Master Albert
2003
Liberman	Trabolgan	Widemouth Bay
2002
Pizarro	Rhinestone Cowboy	Back in Front

2000-1992
2000
Joe Cullen	Inca	Be My Royal
1999
Monsignor	Golden Alpha	Canasta
1998
Alexander Banquet	Joe Mac	Frantic Tan
1997
Florida Pearl	Arctic Camper	All The Colours
1996
Wither Or Which	Alzulu	Mighty Moss
1995
Dato Star	Red Blazer	Skehanagh Bridge
1994
Mucklemeg	Aries Girl	Go Ballistic
1993
Rhythm Section	Heist	Winter Belle
1992
Montelado	Tiananmen Square	Maneree

The Champion Bumper is a Grade 1 National Hunt flat race in Great Britain which is open to racing horses aged four to six years. It is run on the Old Course at Cheltenham over a distance of about 2 miles and ½ furlong (2 miles and 87 yards, or 3,298 metres), and it is scheduled to take place each year during the Cheltenham Festival in March.

The event was established in 1992, and it was initially called the Festival Bumper. In its early years it had various sponsors, including the Tote and Guinness. A more sustained period of sponsorship began when Weatherbys began supporting the race in 1997, and since then it has been known by its present title.

The Champion Bumper is the most prestigious flat race, or "bumper", in the National Hunt calendar. It often features horses which go on to become leading performers over obstacles, such as Florida Pearl and Cue Card. Occasionally jockeys from Flat racing ride in the race and it has been won by leading Flat jockeys Jamie Spencer in 2002 and Colin Keane in 2026.

== Records ==
Leading jockey (4 wins):

- Patrick Mullins – Cousin Vinny (2008), Champagne Fever (2012), Facile Vega (2022), Jasmin De Vaux (2024)

Leading trainer (14 wins):

- Willie Mullins – Wither or Which (1996), Florida Pearl (1997), Alexander Banquet (1998), Joe Cullen (2000), Missed That (2005), Cousin Vinny (2008), Champagne Fever (2012), Briar Hill (2013), Relegate (2018), Ferny Hollow (2020), Sir Gerhard (2021), Facile Vega (2022), Jasmin De Vaux (2024), Bambino Fever (2025)

== Winners ==
Year	Winner	Age	Jockey	Trainer
1992	Montelado	5	Richard Dunwoody	Patrick J. "Pat" Flynn
1993	Rhythm Section	4	Paul Carberry	Homer Scott
1994	Mucklemeg	6	Charlie Swan	Edward O'Grady
1995	Dato Star	4	Mark Dwyer	Malcolm Jefferson
1996	Wither or Which	5	Willie Mullins (Note: amateur jockey)	Willie Mullins
1997	Florida Pearl	5	Richard Dunwoody	Willie Mullins
1998	Alexander Banquet	5	Ruby Walsh	Willie Mullins
1999	Monsignor	5	Brendan Powell	Mark Pitman
2000	Joe Cullen	5	Charlie Swan	Willie Mullins
2001	Abandoned due to a foot-and-mouth outbreak
2002	Pizarro	5	Jamie Spencer	Edward O'Grady
2003	Liberman	5	Tony McCoy	Martin Pipe
2004	Total Enjoyment	5	Jim Culloty	Tom Cooper
2005	Missed That	6	Ruby Walsh	Willie Mullins
2006	Hairy Molly	6	Paul Carberry	Joseph Crowley
2007	Cork All Star	5	Barry Geraghty	Jessica Harrington
2008	Cousin Vinny	5	Patrick Mullins	Willie Mullins
2009	Dunguib	6	Brian O'Connell	Philip Fenton
2010	Cue Card	4	Joe Tizzard	Colin Tizzard
2011	Cheltenian	5	Richard Johnson	Philip Hobbs
2012	Champagne Fever	5	Patrick Mullins	Willie Mullins
2013	Briar Hill	5	Ruby Walsh	Willie Mullins
2014	Silver Concorde	6	Robbie McNamara	Dermot Weld
2015	Moon Racer	6	Tom Scudamore	David Pipe
2016	Ballyandy	5	Sam Twiston-Davies	Nigel Twiston-Davies
2017	Fayonagh	6	Jamie Codd	Gordon Elliott
2018	Relegate	5	Katie Walsh	Willie Mullins
2019	Envoi Allen	5	Jamie Codd	Gordon Elliott
2020	Ferny Hollow	5	Paul Townend	Willie Mullins
2021	Sir Gerhard	6	Rachael Blackmore	Willie Mullins
2022	Facile Vega	5	Patrick Mullins	Willie Mullins
2023	A Dream To Share	5	John Gleeson	John Kiely
2024	Jasmin De Vaux	5	Patrick Mullins	Willie Mullins
2025	Bambino Fever	5	Jody Townend	Willie Mullins
2026	The Mourne Rambler	5	Colin Keane	Noel Meade

== See also ==
- Horse racing in Great Britain
- List of British National Hunt races
- Recurring sporting events established in 1992 – this race is included under its original title, Festival Bumper.
