= Paddy Mullins =

Irish racehorse trainer

Paddy Mullins (28 January 1919 – 28 October 2010) was an Irish racehorse trainer in a career which spanned fifty two years.

== Training career ==
His first winner was Flash Parade, which won the 1953 La Touche at Punchestown. Although he was predominantly a jump trainer, with six Cheltenham Festival successes, four Irish National winners and ten Irish jump trainers' titles, two of his greatest successes were achieved on the Flat. Mullins trained the mare Dawn Run to win Cheltenham's Champion Hurdle in 1984 and Gold Cup in 1986. Ridden in both races by Jonjo O'Neill, she is commemorated with a statue overlooking the Cheltenham paddock. He also won the 2003 Irish Oaks with Vintage Tipple and saddled Hurry Harriet to success in the 1973 Champion Stakes at Newmarket.

== Family ==
He is the father of trainers Tom Mullins, Willie Mullins and Tony Mullins. Mullins trained at Goresbridge, County Kilkenny, from where son Tom assumed control when he retired from training in February, 2005.

== Tributes ==
Mullins died on 28 October 2010. Many tributes were made by fellow trainers, "He was a great friend of mine for a long number of years and he was a top-class trainer," said Jim Bolger. Trainer Noel Meade described Mullins as a "legend" he left "an incredible dynasty behind him".
