= Limestone Lad Hurdle =

Hurdle horse race in Ireland

Limestone Lad Hurdle
2026
Glen Kiln	Karbau	Farren Glory

Previous years
2025
Anzadam	Beacon Edge	Laafi
2024
Zarak The Brave	Telmesomethinggirl	Banntown Girl
2023
Echoes In Rain	Cash Back	Bob Olinger
2022
Darasso	Saint Felicien	Whiskey Sour
2021
Bachasson	Grand Roi	Beacon Edge

2020-2011
2020
Stormy Ireland	Franco De Port	Mengli Khan
2019
Espoir D'Allen	Wicklow Brave	Tombstone
2018
Sandsend	Forge Meadow	Destin D'ajonc
2017
Sutton Place	Supasundae	Ttebbob
2016
Sempre Medici	Massini's Trap	He'llberemembered
2015
Kitten Rock	Glens Melody	King of The Picts
2014
Rule The World	Jennies Jewel	Dunguib
2013
Solwhit	So Young	Whatuthink
2012
Mikael D'Haguenet	Rick	Luska Lad
2011
Shinrock Paddy	Donnas Palm	Stonemaster

2010-2001
2010
Ebadiyan	Muirhead	De Valira
2009
Aitmatov	Clopf	Give It Time
2007
Sweet Kiln	Studmaster	Baron De Feypo
2006
Solerina	Florida Coast	Up Above
2005
Sher Beau	Native Jack	Jay Lo
2004
Solerina	Bob Justice	Take Five
2003
Sacundai	Florida Coast	Rince Ri
2002
Limestone Lad	Commanche Court	Barba Papa
2001
Limestone Lad	Slaney Native	Wicked Crack

2000-1999
2000
Limestone Lad	Dorans Pride	Derrymoyle
1999
Le Coudray	Limestone Lad	Storm Gem

The Limestone Lad Hurdle is a Grade 3 National Hunt hurdle race in Ireland which is open to horses aged five years and over. It is run at Naas over a distance of 2 miles (3,219 metres) and during its running there are eight hurdles to be jumped. The race is scheduled to take place each year in January.

The race was first run in 1999, as the Bank of Ireland Hurdle. It was renamed in 2008 to honour Limestone Lad, who was second in the first running of the race and then won the next three runnings. Prior to 2017 it was run over 2 miles and 3 furlongs.

The race was awarded Grade 3 status in 2011.

== Records ==
Most successful horse (3 wins):

- Limestone Lad – 2000, 2001, 2002

Leading jockey (7 wins):

- Paul Townend - Mikael D'Haguenet (2012), Sandsend (2018), Stormy Ireland (2020), Bachasson (2021), Echoes In Rain (2023), Zarak The Brave (2024), Anzadam (2025)

Leading trainer (8 wins):

- Willie Mullins - Mikael D'Haguenet (2012), Sempre Medici (2016), Sandsend (2018), Stormy Ireland (2020), Bachasson (2021), Echoes In Rain (2023), Zarak The Brave (2024), Anzadam (2025)

== Winners ==
Year	Winner	Age	Jockey	Trainer
1999	Le Coudray	5	Charlie Swan	Aidan O'Brien
2000	Limestone Lad	8	S M McGovern	James Bowe
2001	Limestone Lad	9	S M McGovern	James Bowe
2002	Limestone Lad	10	Paul Carberry	James Bowe
2003	Sacundai	6	Norman Williamson	Edward O'Grady
2004	Solerina	7	Gary Hutchinson	James Bowe
2005	Sher Beau	6	Davy Russell	Philip Fenton
2006	Solerina	9	Gary Hutchinson	James Bowe
2007	Sweet Kiln	8	Davy Russell	James Bowe
2008	Abandoned
2009	Aitmatov	8	Paul Carberry	Noel Meade
2010	Ebadiyan	5	J L Cullen	Patrick O Brady
2011	Shinrock Paddy	7	Alain Cawley	Paul Nolan
2012	Mikael D'Haguenet	8	Paul Townend	Willie Mullins
2013	Solwhit	9	Davy Russell	Charles Byrnes
2014	Rule The World	7	Bryan Cooper	Mouse Morris
2015	Kitten Rock	5	Mark Walsh	Edward O'Grady
2016	Sempre Medici	6	Ruby Walsh	Willie Mullins
2017	Sutton Place	6	Mark Walsh	Gordon Elliott
2018	Sandsend	5	Paul Townend	Willie Mullins
2019	Espoir d'Allen	5	Barry Geraghty	Gavin Cromwell
2020	Stormy Ireland	6	Paul Townend	Willie Mullins
2021	Bachasson	10	Paul Townend	Willie Mullins
2022	Darasso	9	Mark Walsh	Joseph O'Brien
2023	Echoes In Rain	7	Paul Townend	Willie Mullins
2024	Zarak The Brave	5	Paul Townend	Willie Mullins
2025	Anzadam	5	Paul Townend	Willie Mullins
2026	Glen Kiln	7	Brian Hayes	David Kelly

== See also ==
- Horse racing in Ireland
- List of Irish National Hunt races
