= Boyne Hurdle =

Hurdle horse race in Ireland

Boyne Hurdle
2026
Staffordshire Knot	Better Days Ahead	Maxxum

Previous years
2025
Maxxum	Thedevilscoachman	Farren Glory
2024
Hiddenvalley Lake	Beacon Edge	Da Capo Glory
2023
Blazing Khal	Meet And Greet	Beacon Edge
2022
Thedevilscoachman	Ashdale Bob	Commander Of Fleet
2021
Beacon Edge	Fury Road	Darasso

2020-2011
2020
Cracking Smart	Penhill	Bachasson
2019
Tiger Roll	Off You Go	Cracking Smart
2018
Diamond Cauchois	Lieutenant Colonel	Bapaume
2017
Sutton Place	De Plotting Shed	Renneti
2016
Snow Falcon	Lieutenant Colonel	Dedigout
2015
Dedigout	Zaidpour	Gerdago
2014
Dunguib	Zaidpour	Un Beau Matin
2013
On His Own	Si C'etait Vrai	Un Beau Matin
2012
Mourad	Mikael D'Haguenet	Rick
2011
Voler La Vedette	Rigour Back Bob	Oscar Dan Dan

2010-2001
2010
War Of Attrition	Mourad	Ninetieth Minute
2009
Catch Me	Oscar Rebel	Aitmatov
2008
Kazal	Aitmatov	Footy Facts
2007
Sweet Kiln	Rosaker	Emotional Moment
2006
Golden Cross	Florida Coast	Holy Orders
2005
Emotional Moment	Yogi	Jay Lo
2004
Rosaker	Prince Of Tara	Mutineer
2003
Emotional Moment	Over The Bar	No Discount
2002
Bannow Bay	Prince Of Tara	Wicked Crack
2001
Limestone Lad	Boss Doyle	Wicked Crack

2000-1991
2000
Limestone Lad	Sallie's Girl	Dorans Pride
1999
Sallie's Girl	Derrymoyle	Birkdale
1998
Rince Ri	Native Estates	Notcomplainingbut
1998
Rince Ri	Antapoura	Tarthooth
1997
What A Question	Antapoura	Derrymoyle
1996
Derrymoyle	What A Question	Dee Ell
1995
Dorans Pride	Time For A Run	Chance Coffey
1994
Minella Lad	Templeroan Prince	Novello Allegro
1993
Dee Ell	Shuil Ar Aghaidh	Bayrouge
1992
Trapper John	Nancy Myles	Polly Tinkerton

1990-1988
1990
Trapper John	Galmoy	Firions Law
1989
Bankers Benefit	Attitude Adjuster	Mayobridge
1988
Galmoy	Maid Of Money	Princess Rapunzel

The Boyne Hurdle is Grade 2 National Hunt hurdle race in Ireland. It is run at Navan in February, over a distance of about 2 miles and 5 furlongs (4,225 metres) and during the race there are 12 hurdles to be jumped. The race was first run in 1987 as a Grade 3 race, and was run over a distance of 2 miles and 6 furlongs until 1994. It was awarded Grade 2 status in 2008.

== Records ==
Most successful horse (2 wins):

- Trapper John - 1990, 1992
- Limestone Lad – 2001, 2002
- Emotional Moment - 2003, 2005

Leading jockey (4 wins):

- Barry Geraghty – Emotional Moment (2003, 2005), Kazal (2008), Sutton Place (2017)
- Davy Russell - Sweet Kiln (2007), War of Attrition (2010), Diamond Cauchois (2018), Cracking Smart (2020)

Leading trainer (6 wins):

- Gordon Elliott - Sutton Place (2017), Diamond Cauchois (2018), Tiger Roll (2019), Cracking Smart (2020), Maxxum (2025), Staffordshire Knot (2026)

== Winners ==
Year	Winner	Jockey	Trainer
1987	Welcome Pin	Tony Mullins	Paddy Mullins
1988	Galmoy	Tommy Carmody	John Mulhern
1989	Bankers Benefit	Andrew Coonan (Note: amateur jockey)	John Fowler
1990	Trapper John	Charlie Swan	Mouse Morris
	no race 1991
1992	Trapper John	Charlie Swan	Mouse Morris
1993	Dee Ell	Tom Taaffe	Arthur Moore
1994	Minella Lad	Trevor Horgan	Aidan O'Brien
1995	Dorans Pride	Shane Broderick	Michael Hourigan
1996	Derrymoyle	Mark Dwyer	Michael Cunningham
1997	What A Question	Conor O'Dwyer	Mouse Morris
1998	Rince Ri	Garrett Cotter	Ted Walsh
1999	Sallie's Girl	Paul Carberry	Noel Meade
2000	Limestone Lad	Shane McGovern	James Bowe
2001	Limestone Lad	Shane McGovern	James Bowe
2002	Bannow Bay	Charlie Swan	Christy Roche
2003	Emotional Moment	Barry Geraghty	Tom Taaffe
2004	Rosaker	Paul Carberry	Noel Meade
2005	Emotional Moment	Barry Geraghty	Tom Taaffe
2006	Golden Cross	Johnny Murtagh	Mick Halford
2007	Sweet Kiln	Davy Russell	Michael Bowe
2008	Kazal	Barry Geraghty	Eoin Griffin
2009	Catch Me	Andrew McNamara	Edward O'Grady
2010	War Of Attrition	Davy Russell	Mouse Morris
2011	Voler La Vedette	Andrew Lynch	Colm Murphy
2012	Mourad	Paul Townend	Willie Mullins
2013	On His Own	Paul Townend	Willie Mullins
2014	Dunguib	Brian O'Connell	Philip Fenton
2015	Dedigout	Bryan Cooper	Tony Martin
2016	Snow Falcon	Sean Flanagan	Noel Meade
2017	Sutton Place	Barry Geraghty	Gordon Elliott
2018	Diamond Cauchois	Davy Russell	Gordon Elliott
2019	Tiger Roll	Keith Donoghue	Gordon Elliott
2020	Cracking Smart	Davy Russell	Gordon Elliott
2021	Beacon Edge	Sean Flanagan	Noel Meade
2022	Thedevilscoachman	Mark Walsh	Noel Meade
2023	Blazing Khal	Philip Byrnes	Charles Byrnes
2024	Hiddenvalley Lake	Henry de Bromhead	Darragh O'Keeffe
2025	Maxxum	Sam Ewing	Gordon Elliott
2026	Staffordshire Knot	Jack Kennedy	Gordon Elliott

== See also ==
- Horse racing in Ireland
- List of Irish National Hunt races
