= Lismullen Hurdle =

Hurdle horse race in Ireland

Lismullen Hurdle
2026
Feet Of A Dancer	I'll Sort That	Casheldale Lad

Previous years
2025
Colonel Mustard	The Yellow Clay	Jetara
2024
Home By The Lee	Bob Olinger	Eagle Fang
2023
Bob Olinger	Zanahiyr	Home By The Lee
2022
Home By The Lee	Bob Olinger	Ashdale Bob
2021
Darasso	Sire Du Berlais	Grand Roi

2020-2011
2020
Sire Du Berlais	French Dynamite	Sixshooter
2019
Bacardys	Apple's Jade	Magic Of Light
2018
Apple's Jade	Jezki	Coney Island
2017
Apple's Jade	Jer's Girl	Flaxen Flare
2016
Snow Falcon	De Plotting Shed	Shaneshill
2015
Arctic Fire	Monksland	Taglietelle
2014
Zaidpour	Noble Endeavor	Darwins Fox
2013
Dedigout	Mala Beach	Captain Cee Bee
2012
Whatuthink	Voler La Vedette	Prima Vista
2011
Voler La Vedette	Fully Funded	Mikael D'Haguenet

2010-2001
2010
Oscar Dan Dan	Jumbo Rio	Moskova
2009
Aitmatov	Noble Prince	Ninetieth Minute
2008
Catch Me	Whatuthink	Give It Time
2007
Sweet Kiln	Rosaker	Kerryhead Windfarm
2006
Rosaker	Emotional Moment	Brogella
2005
Solerina	Back In Front	Prince Of Tara
2004
Solerina	Rosaker	Florida Coast
2003
Rosaker	Hardy Eustace	Strong Project
2002
Limestone Lad	Liss A Paoraigh	Kadoun
2001
Liss A Paoraigh	Limestone Lad	Kadoun

2000-1991
2000
Rose Of Inchiquin	Bannow Bay	Sallie's Girl
1999
Le Coudray	Limestone Lad	Native Estates
1998
Commanche Court	Nomadic	Guest Performance
1997
Cockney Lad	Theatreworld	Dardjini
1996
Urubande	New Co	Notcomplainingbut
1995
Dorans Pride	Clahada Rose	Heist
1994
Dorans Pride	Time For A Run	Jupiter Jimmy
1993
Novello Allegro	Beglawella	Punters Bar
1992
Novello Allegro	Irish Peace	Practitioner
1991
Trapper John	Destriero	Call Me Later

1990-1988
1990
Cloughtaney	Barry's Joy	Fauvism
1989
Cloughtaney	She's Pretty	Galmoy
1988
Cloughtaney	She's A Monkey	Corbally Hill

The Lismullen Hurdle is a Grade 2 National Hunt hurdle race in Ireland which is open to horses aged four years or older. It is run at Navan over a distance of about 2 miles and 4 furlongs (4,023 metres), and it is scheduled to take place each year in November.

The event was formerly restricted to amateur jockeys, and it used to be contested in mid-December. For a period its distance was 2 miles and 5 furlongs. It ceased to be an amateur race in 1991, and at the same time it was cut by 2 furlongs. Its present length was introduced in 1992, and two years later it was given Grade 3 status and moved to early November. The race was promoted to Grade 2 level in 1997.

== Records ==
Most successful horse (3 wins):

- Cloughtaney – 1988,1989,1990

Leading jockey (5 wins):

- Charlie Swan – Trapper John (1991), Novello Allegro (1992), Urubande (1996), Le Coudray (1999), Liss A Paoraigh (2001)
- Paul Carberry - Novello Allegro (1993), Limestone Lad (2002), Rosaker (2003, 2006), Aitmatov (2009)

Leading trainer (7 wins):

- Noel Meade - Novello Allegro (1992, 1993), Cockney Lad (1997), Rosaker (2003, 2006), Aitmatov (2009), Snow Falcon (2013)

== Winners since 1988 ==
Year	Winner	Age	Jockey	Trainer
1988	Cloughtaney	7	Willie Mullins (Note: amateur rider)	Paddy Mullins
1989	Cloughtaney	8	Tom Mullins	Paddy Mullins
1990	Cloughtaney	9	Willie Mullins	Paddy Mullins
1991	Trapper John	7	Charlie Swan	Mouse Morris
1992	Novello Allegro	4	Charlie Swan	Noel Meade
1993	Novello Allegro	5	Paul Carberry	Noel Meade
1994	Dorans Pride	5	Shane Broderick	Michael Hourigan
1995	Dorans Pride	6	Shane Broderick	Michael Hourigan
1996	Urubande	6	Charlie Swan	Aidan O'Brien
1997	Cockney Lad	8	Barry Geraghty	Noel Meade
1998	Commanche Court	5	Ruby Walsh	Ted Walsh
1999	Le Coudray	5	Charlie Swan	Aidan O'Brien
2000	Rose of Inchiquin	7	Tommy Treacy	Sean Treacy
2001	Liss A Paoraigh	6	Charlie Swan	John Kiely
2002	Limestone Lad	10	Paul Carberry	James Bowe
2003	Rosaker	6	Paul Carberry	Noel Meade
2004	Solerina	7	Gary Hutchinson	James Bowe
2005	Solerina	8	Gary Hutchinson	James Bowe
2006	Rosaker	9	Paul Carberry	Noel Meade
2007	Sweet Kiln	8	Tom Doyle	Michael Bowe
2008	Catch Me	6	Andrew McNamara	Edward O'Grady
2009	Aitmatov	8	Paul Carberry	Noel Meade
2010	Oscar Dan Dan	8	Paul Townend	Thomas Mullins
2011	Voler la Vedette	7	Andrew Lynch	Colm Murphy
2012	Whatuthink	10	Tom Doyle	Oliver McKiernan
2013	Dedigout	7	Davy Russell	Tony Martin
2014	Zaidpour	8	Ruby Walsh	Willie Mullins
2015	Arctic Fire	6	Ruby Walsh	Willie Mullins
2016	Snow Falcon	6	Sean Flanagan	Noel Meade
2017	Apple's Jade	5	Jack Kennedy	Gordon Elliott
2018	Apple's Jade	6	Jack Kennedy	Gordon Elliott
2019	Bacardys	8	Paul Townend	Willie Mullins
2020	Sire Du Berlais	8	Mark Walsh	Gordon Elliott
2021	Darasso	8	Luke Dempsey	Joseph O'Brien
2022	Home By The Lee	7	JJ Slevin	Joseph O'Brien
2023	Bob Olinger	8	Rachael Blackmore	Henry de Bromhead
2024	Home By The Lee	9	Danny Mullins	Joseph O'Brien
2025	Colonel Mustard	10	John Shinnick	Lorna Fowler
2026	Feet Of A Dancer	7	Sean O'Keeffe	Paul Nolan

== See also ==
- Horse racing in Ireland
- List of Irish National Hunt races
