= Limestone Lad =

Irish-bred Thoroughbred racehorse (1992–2024)

- Racing silks of James Bowe
- Sire: Aristocracy
- Grandsire: Lord Gayle
- Dam: Limestone Miss
- Damsire: Raise You Ten
- Sex: Gelded male
- Foaled: 1 April 1992
- Died: 28 March 2024 (aged 31)
- Country: Ireland
- Colour: Bay
- Breeder: James Bowe
- Owner: James Bowe
- Trainer: James Bowe
- Record: 65: 35-13-6; 4: 0-1-2 flat 8: 2-0-1 NHF; 47: 29-11-3 hurdles 6: 4-1-0 chases
- Earnings: £546,142

Major wins
- Morgiana Hurdle (1999, 2001, 2002); Hatton's Grace Hurdle (1999, 2001, 2002); Christmas Hurdle (1999, 2002); Bank of Ireland Hurdle (2000, 2001, 2002); Boyne Hurdle (2000, 2001); Irish Field Novice Chase (2000); Craddockstown Novice Chase (2000); Champion Stayers' Hurdle (2002); Lismullen Hurdle (2002)

Honours
- Limestone Lad Hurdle

Limestone Lad (1 April 1992 – 28 March 2024) was an Irish Thoroughbred racehorse who competed mainly in National Hunt racing. Bred, owned and trained by a farming family in rural Ireland he was offered for sale as a three-year-old but was rejected after failing a medical examination. His early racing career was unremarkable but he made steady improvement and eventually retired with a record of thirty-five wins and nineteen places from sixty-five races. He was best known for his durability and his performances in long-distance hurdle races and usually raced from the front.

Limestone Lad began by running in National Hunt Flat races and was unplaced in his first four starts before winning two minor races and was then switched to novice hurdles, winning one of his next six starts before the end of the 1997/98 National Hunt season. In the following season, he improved through the handicap hurdle ranks, winning seven of his ten starts. In the 1999/2000 season he emerged as a top-class performer, winning eight races including the Morgiana Hurdle, Hatton's Grace Hurdle (beating Istabraq), Christmas Hurdle, Bank of Ireland Hurdle and Boyne Hurdle. In the following season he was tried over fences and won the Irish Field Novice Chase, Craddockstown Novice Chase as well as repeating his previous wins in the Bank of Ireland Hurdle and the Boyne Hurdle.

Limestone Lad returned to hurdling in the 2001/02 National Hunt season and won six races including a second Morgiana Hurdle, a second Hatton's Grace Hurdle, a third Bank of Ireland Hurdle and the Champion Stayers' Hurdle. In his final season he won another five races including the Lismullen Hurdle, a second Christmas Hurdle, a third Morgiana Hurdle and a third Hatton's Grace Hurdle. At the end of his racing career he was described as "Ireland's most famous racehorse".

== Background ==
Limestone Lad was a bay gelding with no white markings, bred and owned by James Bowe of Gathabawn, near Johnstown, County Kilkenny. He was the most successful horse sired by Aristocracy, who won at least five races in Ireland between 1976 and 1978 including the Whitehall Stakes. Limestone Lad's dam, Limestone Miss, was an unraced mare who also produced Miss Lime, a winner of three races, including a fifteen length defeat of Dorans Pride at Thurles. Limestone Miss was a daughter of Miss Kiln, who was in turn a daughter of Kinneagh, a mare bought by James Bowe for about 100 guineas. Kinneagh's other foals included Drumgora, who won the Champion Chase in 1981. Kinneagh was a great-granddaughter of the broodmare Simone Vergnes, whose other descendants included The Oaks winner Why Hurry and the Champion Stakes winner Marguerite Vernaut.

Limestone Lad was scheduled to be offered for sale as a three-year-old gelding at Tattersalls Ireland in June 1995, but was withdrawn from the auction after the auctioneer's vet found that he had an abnormal heartbeat. The gelding was officially trained throughout his racing career by James Bowe, although the day-to-day handling was managed by his son Michael on the family farm which was also home to 60 cattle and 150 sheep. Commenting on the process of training the horse Michael Bowe said "Everything you taught him, you had to do it slowly and carefully – but once he picked it up he would die or do it. He was so genuine, all he wanted to do was to please you". He was often subjected to demanding schedules, with few breaks: Bowe explained the strategy by saying "He is happiest racing frequently and the more you take him racing the more he likes it".

== Racing career ==
=== Early career ===
Limestone Lad began his racing career competing in National Hunt Flat races, also known as "bumpers". On his debut at Naas Racecourse on 12 February 1997, he started at odds of 20/1 and finished ninth of the twenty four runners, eighteen lengths behind the winner Mount Druid. He was well beaten in further bumpers at Naas (behind the future Grand National winner Amberleigh House), Cork and Thurles, before recording his first success in a race confined to female riders at Limerick Racecourse on 27 December. Ridden by Aileen Sloan-Lee he won "easily" by nine lengths from thirteen opponents at odds of 6/1. Michael Bowe later recalled "I suspected we had something exciting on our hands when he won that day. My lasting memory after that race was holding him in the car park, giving him a piece of grass with a band playing in the background. They were playing Perfect Day – and it was". In January 1998 he finished a distant third at Navan Racecourse and then finished sixth of the ten runners at Gowran Park. On his final appearance in a bumper, the gelding led from the start to win an eleven-runner contest at Naas, beating the mare Our Meg by two and a half lengths.

Limestone Lad was then switched to hurdles and ran six more times before the end of the season. On his debut over obstacles he finished fifth at Navan, and then finished second at Limerick and at Clonmel Racecourse before running fifth at Cork in April. Later that month, he started at odds of 9/2 for a novice hurdle over two and a half miles on heavy ground at Clonmel. He led from the start and won by nine lengths from the favourite Almira. On his final appearance of the season he was matched against more experienced opponents in a handicap hurdle at Clonmel and finished fourth of the seventeen runners behind Micko's Dream.

=== Hurdles ===
==== 1998/1999 National Hunt season ====
In the 1998/1999 National Hunt season, Limestone Lad began his campaign with three consecutive wins in handicap hurdles: he won by four and a half lengths at Naas in November, by six lengths at Navan on 12 December and by six lengths at Leopardstown Racecourse sixteen days later. After the gelding finished second to Le Coudray at Naas in January, James Bowe was greeted with laughter by the press when he claimed that Limestone Lad would have won if he had not missed three days' work because the trainer was away at a cattle mart. He then led from the start to win a handicap at Leopardstown on 7 February. In the Red Mills Trial Hurdle two weeks later he made most of the running before finishing second to Nomadic. On 7 March he won a handicap at Leopardstown by a neck from Gentle Mossy, conceding thirty-five pounds to the runner-up, and then won at Naas a week later, leading for most of the way and winning by thirteen lengths under top weight of 161 pounds. Seven days later at Leopardstown he won again, carrying 164 pounds and leading from the start before coming home ten lengths clear of his four opponents. On his final appearance of the season, Limestone Lad was dropped back in distance for the Grade 1 Punchestown Champion Hurdle over two miles in which he was matched against the dual Champion Hurdler Istabraq in what was described as a "David-against-Goliath" task. He led until the second last before finishing third behind Istabraq and Decoupage, beaten eight and a half lengths by the winner.

==== 1999/2000 National Hunt season ====
In the following season, with Shane McGovern as his regular jockey, Limestone Lad won eight races and finished second three times in a twelve race campaign which saw him emerge as a leading staying hurdler. In October he won a minor hurdle at Cork, finished second to Istabraq at Tipperary and then finished runner-up to Le Coudray in the Grade 2 Lismullen Hurdle. On 6 November at Naas he won the Brown Lad Handicap by nine lengths from Lord Dal, conceding twenty-eight pounds to the runner-up, and a week later he recorded his first Graded race success when he won the Morgiana Hurdle, leading from the start and beating the four-year-old Golden Rule by four and a half lengths at odds of 4/7. On 28 November, Limestone Lad faced Istabraq for the third time in the Hatton's Grace Hurdle over two and a half miles at Fairyhouse. Istabraq had won eighteen of his last nineteen races and started at odds of 1/7 with Limestone Lad, on 13/2, was the only one of his four opponents to attract any real support in the betting. Limestone Lad took the lead from the start as usual and opened up a clear lead but the favourite moved up to challenge at the second last. On this occasion, however, Limestone Lad drew away again in the closing stages and won by five and a half lengths, with a gap of more than thirty lengths back to the Welsh challenger Master Beveled in third. The Independent's correspondent described the result as the biggest upset of the year, whilst Istabraq's trainer, Aidan O'Brien offered no excuses, commenting, "Take nothing away from the winner, he is a very good horse". Limestone Lad recorded two more wins before the end of the year: he defeated his old rival Le Coudray by twenty lengths in a handicap at Navan on 11 December, and then won the Grade 2 Irish Christmas Hurdle over three miles at Leopardstown, beating Boss Doyle by more than thirty lengths at odds of 1/6. The latter race saw the jockeys of the beaten horses fined by the racecourse stewards under the "non-triers rule", but the verdict was quickly reversed on appeal in what became briefly known as the "Limestone Lad Affair".

The gelding was dropped back in distance for the Grade 1 Irish Champion Hurdle at Leopardstown in January, but his winning run came to an end as he was outpaced in the closing stages and finished fourth behind Istabraq, Stage Affair and Knife Edge. Limestone Lad was back in action a week later at Naas, when he won the two and a half mile Bank of Ireland Hurdle by eight lengths from Dorans Pride. In the three mile Boyne Hurdle at Navan on 20 February he led from the start and won easily by twenty lengths from Sallie's Girl, conceding fourteen pounds to the runner-up. In March 2000, Limestone Lad was sent to England for the first time to contest the Stayers' Hurdle over three miles at the Cheltenham Festival and started the 3/1 second favourite behind the mare Lady Rebecca. He did not make the running as he had done in most of his previous races, but overtook the leader Bacchanal to gain the advantage approaching the last. He jumped poorly however and lost the lead to Bacchanal on the run-in, finishing second by a length. Michael Bowe was reportedly "philosophical" about his horse's defeat and explained to a BBC journalist that the gelding had reacted badly to the journey from Ireland and had not eaten or drank since his arrival at Cheltenham. By the end of the season, his popularity rivaled that of Istabraq and Danoli.

=== Steeplechasing ===
==== 2000/2001 National Hunt season ====
Limestone Lad began the 2000/2001 National Hunt season by finishing second to Bannow Bay in a hurdle at Cork on 1 October and was then switched to compete in novice steeplechases. He was ridden in his next five races by Barry Cash. On his debut over larger obstacles he won at Cork on 15 October and followed up at the same track six days later, beating the Sefton Novices' Hurdle winner Sackville by three lengths after what was described by the Racing Post as "a rousing battle" with Limestone Lad rallying after being headed at the fourth last. After the race, Cash described the winner as "easily the best horse I've ridden". In November he was stepped up in class for two Grade 3 races at Punchestown. He won the two and a half mile Irish Field Novice Chase by eleven lengths and then dropped to two miles for the Craddockstown Novice Chase thirteen days later and won by fifteen lengths from the mare Generosa. In December he started favourite ahead of four opponents in the Grade 1 Drinmore Novice Chase at Fairyhouse, but after leading until the third last he was overtaken and finished fourth behind Sackville, beaten eight lengths by the winner. After the race, Michael Bowe said that the horse had "run his heart out", but admitted that he was "nowhere near as confident jumping fences as he was hurdles".

In early 2001, Limestone Lad returned to hurdles and won the Bank of Ireland Hurdle at Naas, before beating Boss Doyle by three and a half lengths to take the Boyne Hurdle for a second time in February. He was unable to contest the 2001 Cheltenham Festival as the meeting was abandoned owing to an outbreak of foot-and-mouth disease. At Fairyhouse in spring he finished third to Bannow Bay in the Champion Stayers Hurdle. In his final steeplechase he finished second to Sackville in the Powers Gold Cup at the same course nine days later.

=== Return to hurdles ===
==== 2001/2002 National Hunt season ====
Limestone Lad, began the next season by making his debut in a flat race, finishing third in a two-mile maiden race at Navan and then finished second to the mare Liss A Paoraigh in the Lismullen Hurdle at the same track on 3 November. A week later he won the Brown Lad Hurdle again at Naas, leading all the way and winning by six lengths when conceding more than twenty pounds to his five opponents. Seven days later he attempted to record his second win in the Morgiana Hurdle and started third favourite behind Ned Kelly who was unbeaten in seven races over hurdles including the Herald Champion Novice Hurdle, and Youlneverwalkalone who had won the Hatton's Grace Hurdle in 2000. Limestone Lad led until overtaken by Ned Kelly at the second last but rallied to regain the lead on the running and won by half a length. On 7 December, the gelding, ridden by Paul Carberry won the Hatton's Grace Hurdle for the second time, making all the running to win from Liss A Paoraigh, Ned Kelly and Bannow Bay. After the race, Michael Bowe named the Stayer's Hurdle at Cheltenham as his horse's main target but said that he would consider a run in the Champion Hurdle if the ground was soft. He ran twice more before the end of the year, winning a minor event at Navan from the Willie Mullins-trained Catch Ball and then finishing second to Bannow Bay in the Christmas Hurdle.

In January Limestone Lad won the Bank of Ireland Hurdle for the third time, beating Commanche Court by ten lengths whilst conceding sixteen pounds to the runner-up. Plans to contest the Stayers' Hurdle at Cheltenham had to be abandoned after the gelding injured muscles in his back in a paddock accident later that month. Michael Bowen said "I'm devastated that we might not make it. I'm sorry for all the people in the locality who have booked trips to the Festival". On 7 April, Limestone Lad returned in a two-mile flat race at the Curragh and finished third behind Ned Kelly and Beef Or Salmon. Eighteen days later, he started 4/6 favourite for the Champion Stayers Hurdle at Punchestown. He took the lead from the start and drew away from his opponents from the fourth last to win by six lengths from the Ted Walsh-trained Bob Justice. On his final appearance of the season he finished second to Holy Orders in a flat race at Navan in May.

==== 2002/2003 National Hunt season ====
Limestone Lad began his final season when he finished unplaced in a flat race at the Curragh in October. On 3 November he won the Lismullen Hurdle, reversing the previous year's form to beat Liss A Paoraigh by two lengths after leading from the start. Ten days later he confirmed his superiority over Liss A Paoraigh as he recorded his third win in the Morgiana Hurdle, beating the mare by eleven lengths. On 1 December Limestone Lad was matched against his old rival Ned Kelly as well as the Herald Champion Novice Hurdle winner Scottish Memories in the Hatton's Grace Hurdle. Ridden by Barry Geraghty, he led from the start, went clear of his rivals approaching the last and won the race for the third time, beating Scottish Memories by eight lengths despite being eased down in the closing stages. Two weeks later he won the Giltspur Scientific Hurdle at Navan, conceding fifteen pounds to Liss A Paoraigh and winning by six lengths. After the victory, which was loudly cheered by the crowd, Michael Bowe said that the horse was "better than ever". On 26 December, Limestone Lad faced Bannow Bay again as he attempted to repeat his 1999 success in the Christmas Hurdle. Ridden by Carberry he made all the running, went clear at the second last and won by nine lengths from Boss Doyle, with Bannow Bay two and a half lengths back in third.

In January he started 15/8 second favourite for the Irish Champion Hurdle but after leading for most of the way and rallying strongly on the run-in he was beaten a head by the mare Like-A-Butterfly. On 13 March 2003 Limestone Lad made his final racecourse appearance when he ran for the second time in the Stayers' Hurdle at Cheltenham. His preparation for the race had been disrupted after he had suffered from a respiratory infection which forced him to miss an intended run in the Boyne Hurdle. He started joint-favourite with the French gelding Baracouda, and led until being overtaken at the last flight and finishing third behind Baracouda and Iris's Gift. Bowe commented, "He was actually devastated after the race. They know when they've been beaten and I've never seen him as put out. There was no consoling him. It took a couple of days for him to cheer up". There were plans to run the horse at Punchestown later that spring, but he never ran again.

== Retirement ==
At the end of the 2002/2003 National Hunt season Limestone Lad was retired to the Bowe's farm in Tipperary. His owner and breeder James Bowe died in 2009 at the age of 77 having relinquished his training licence to Michael two years earlier. In February 2013, Michael Bowe said of Limestone Lad "He's probably in as good a health now as he ever has been. He's enjoying a well-earned retirement and sometimes you'd love to go and throw a saddle on his back". In November 2017 Michael Bowe reported that Limestone Lad was "...still with me, alive and well. He has the rug on him out in the field and he's probably doing better than I am with age!".

Limestone Lad died on 28 March 2024, at the age of 31.

== Assessment and honours ==
The Bank of Ireland Hurdle, which Limestone Lad won in 2000, 2001 and 2002, was renamed the Limestone Lad Hurdle in 2009 and elevated to Grade 3 level two years later.

== Pedigree ==
Pedigree of Limestone Lad (IRE), bay gelding, 1992
Sire Aristocracy (IRE) 1974	Lord Gayle (USA); 1965	Sir Gaylord	Turn-To
Sire Aristocracy (IRE) 1974	Lord Gayle (USA); 1965	Sir Gaylord	Somethingroyal
Sire Aristocracy (IRE) 1974	Lord Gayle (USA); 1965	Sticky Case	Court Martial
Sire Aristocracy (IRE) 1974	Lord Gayle (USA); 1965	Sticky Case	Run Honey
Sire Aristocracy (IRE) 1974	Roxboro (GB); 1968	Sheshoon	Precipitation
Sire Aristocracy (IRE) 1974	Roxboro (GB); 1968	Sheshoon	Noorani
Sire Aristocracy (IRE) 1974	Roxboro (GB); 1968	Sally Stream	Royal Challenger
Sire Aristocracy (IRE) 1974	Roxboro (GB); 1968	Sally Stream	Cheveley Lass
Dam Limestone Miss (GB) 1981	Raise You Ten (GB); 1960	Tehran	Bois Roussel
Dam Limestone Miss (GB) 1981	Raise You Ten (GB); 1960	Tehran	Stafaralla
Dam Limestone Miss (GB) 1981	Raise You Ten (GB); 1960	Visor	Combat
Dam Limestone Miss (GB) 1981	Raise You Ten (GB); 1960	Visor	Eyewash
Dam Limestone Miss (GB) 1981	Miss Kiln (IRE); 1976	Sir Herbert	Pampered King
Dam Limestone Miss (GB) 1981	Miss Kiln (IRE); 1976	Sir Herbert	Phare Rosa
Dam Limestone Miss (GB) 1981	Miss Kiln (IRE); 1976	Kinneagh	Limekiln
Dam Limestone Miss (GB) 1981	Miss Kiln (IRE); 1976	Kinneagh	Lovely Alien (Family:14-b)
