= Cork E.B.F. Novice Chase =

Hurdle horse race in Ireland

Cork E.B.F. Novice Chase
2026
Love Me Tender	Frankie John	Vicar Street

Previous years
2025
Ol Man Dingle	You Oughta Know	Mossy Fen Park
2024
Gorgeous Tom	Monbeg Park	Jesse Evans
2023
Letsbeclearaboutit	Mighty Tom	Senecia
2022
El Barra	Idas Boy	Brampton Belle
2021
Cape Gentleman	Run Wild Fred	Bleu Berry

2020-2011
2020
Home By The Lee	Waitnsee	Foxy Jacks
2019
Brahma Bull	Ex Patriot	Daly Tiger
2018
Winter Escape	Clara Sorrento	High Nellie
2017
Bamako Moriviere	Jury Duty	Woodland Opera
2016
Alpha Des Obeaux	Westerner Lady	Thanks For Tea
2015
Lord Scoundrel	Rightdownthemiddle	Padraig's Joy
2014
Perfect Gentleman	Sadler's Risk	Silver Tassie
2013
Sizing Rio	Clar Na Mionn	Rogue Angel
2012
Baily Green	Tofino Bay	Laganbank
2011
First Lieutenant	Stephanie Kate	Cross Appeal

2010-2001
2010
Back Of The Pack	Beau Michael	Farringdon
2008
Tranquil Sea	Baltiman	Whatever Next
2007
Sky's The Limit	Call Bewleys	Classic Croco
2006
Anothercoppercoast	Mossbank	Django
2005
Tumbling Dice	Calorando	Laragh House
2004
Cane Brake	Dizzy's Dream	Strike Back
2003
Broadstone Road	Hehasalife	Executive Director
2001
Golden Storm	Oa Baldixe	Get It Done

2000-1999
2000
Limestone Lad	Sackville	Shannon Gale
1999
Three Rivers	Ballyrihy Boy	Borzov

The Cork E.B.F. Novice Chase is a Grade 3 National Hunt novice steeplechase in Ireland which is open to horses aged five years or older. It is run at Cork over a distance of 2 miles and 4 furlongs (4,023 metres), and it is scheduled to take place each year in late October or early November. The race has been sponsored by Paddy Power since 2014.

The race was first run in 1999 and was awarded Grade 3 status in 2010.

== Records ==
Leading jockey (3 wins):

- Ruby Walsh – Golden Storm (2001), Perfect Gentleman (2014), Bamako Moriviere (2017)

Leading trainer (6 wins):

- Willie Mullins - Three Rivers (1999), Perfect Gentleman (2014), Bamako Moriviere (2017), Brahma Bull (2019), El Barra (2022), Love Me Tender (2026)

== Winners ==
Year	Winner	Age	Jockey	Trainer
1999	Three Rivers	6	Barry Geraghty	Willie Mullins
2000	Limestone Lad	8	Barry Cash	James Bowe
2001	Golden Storm	4	Ruby Walsh	Frances Crowley
2002	no race 2002
2003	Broadstone Road	6	D J Howard	Paul John Gilligan
2004	Cane Brake	5	Shay Barry	David Wachman
2005	Tumbling Dice	6	Barry Geraghty	Tom Taaffe
2006	Anothercoppercoast	6	Paul Carberry	Paul A Roche
2007	Sky's The Limit	6	Andrew McNamara	Edward O'Grady
2008	Tranquil Sea	6	Andrew McNamara	Edward O'Grady
2009	no race 2009
2010	Back Of The Pack	8	M Darcy	Colin Kidd
2011	First Lieutenant	6	Davy Russell	Mouse Morris
2012	Baily Green	6	David Casey	Mouse Morris
2013	Sizing Rio	5	Andrew Lynch	Henry de Bromhead
2014	Perfect Gentleman	9	Ruby Walsh	Willie Mullins
2015	Lord Scoundrel	6	Bryan Cooper	Gordon Elliott
2016	Alpha Des Obeaux	6	David Mullins	Mouse Morris
2017	Bamako Moriviere	6	Ruby Walsh	Willie Mullins
2018	Winter Escape	7	Mark Walsh	Aidan Anthony Howard
2019	Brahma Bull	8	Brian Hayes	Willie Mullins
2020	Home By The Lee	5	JJ Slevin	Joseph O'Brien
2021	Cape Gentleman	5	Brian Hayes	Emmet Mullins
2022	El Barra	8	Paul Townend	Willie Mullins
2023	Letsbeclearaboutit	8	Sean Flanagan	Gavin Cromwell
2024	Gorgeous Tom	6	Darragh O'Keeffe	Henry de Bromhead
2025	Ol Man Dingle	6	Ricky Doyle	Eoin Griffin
2026	Love Me Tender	5	Harry Cobden	Willie Mullins

== See also ==
- Horse racing in Ireland
- List of Irish National Hunt races
