= Naas Directors Plate Novice Chase =

Annual National Hunt race in Ireland

Naas Directors Plate Novice Chase
2024
Tactical Move	Jumping Jet	Jacksons Gold

Previous years
2023
Journey With Me	Limerick Lace	Flanking Maneuver
2022
Delvino	Lifetime Ambition	Jeremys Flame
2021
Conflated	Waitnsee	Ministerforsport

2020-2011
2020
Royal Rendezvous	Ministerforsport	Gallant John Joe
2019
Kaiser Black	Camelia De Cotte	Robin Des Foret
2017
Ball D'arc	Gangster	Prince Of Scars
2016
Sub Lieutenant	Tell Us More	Arctic Skipper
2015
Fine Rightly	Rule The World	Azorian
2014
Bright New Dawn	Letter Of Credit	Owega Star
2013
Dedigout	You Must Know Me	Banjaxed Girl
2012
Flemenstar	Frisco Depot	Bog Warrior
2011
Prince Erik	Montan	Sam Adams

2010-2001
2010
Zaarito	Whatuthink	Beckett Rock
2009
Joncol	Top Of The Rock	Travino
2008
Wheresben	Freds Benefit	Kilcrea Castle
2007
Offshore Account	Preists Leap	Hear The Echo
2006
Mansony	King Johns Castle	Majlis
2005
Green Belt Flyer	Davenport Milenium	Adarma
2004
Emperors Guest	Camden Tanner	Munster
2003
Rathgar Beau	Glens Music	Schwartzhalle
2002
Mantles Prince	Satcoslam	Over The First

2000-1999
2000
Donadino	Shanes Hero	Yashgans Vision
1999
Oneofourown	Brambledale	Tarthooth

The Naas Directors Plate Novice Chase is a Grade 3 National Hunt novice chase in Ireland which is open to horses aged five years or older. It is run at Naas over a distance of 2 miles and 4 furlongs (4,023 metres) and during the race there are 13 fences to be jumped. It is scheduled to take place each year in March.

The race was first run in 1999 and was awarded Grade 3 status in 2012. It was originally titled the Kilcock Novice Chase and has been run under its present title since 2010.

== Records ==
Most successful jockey (2 wins):

- David Casey - Donadino (2000), Offshore Account (2007)
- Davy Condon - Zaarito (2010), Prince Erik (2011)
- Davy Russell - Dedigout (2013), Fine Rightly (2015)
- Bryan Cooper - Bright New Dawn (2014), Ball D'Arc (2017)

Most successful trainer (2 wins):

- Charlie Swan– Donadino (2000), Offshore Account (2007)
- Willie Mullins - Royal Rendezvous(2020), Tactical Move (2024)

== Winners ==
Year	Winner	Age	Jockey	Trainer
1999	Oneofourown	8	K P Gaule	S Donohoe
2000	Donadino	7	David Casey	Charlie Swan
2001	Cancelled due to foot-and-mouth crisis
2002	Mantles Prince	8	J L Cullen	P Hughes
2003	Rathgar Beau	7	Barry Geraghty	E Sheehy
2004	Emperors Guest	6	Robbie Power	Paddy Mullins
2005	Green Belt Flyer	7	Robbie Power	Jessica Harrington
2006	Mansony	7	Conor O'Dwyer	Arthur Moore
2007	Offshore Account	7	David Casey	Charlie Swan
2008	Wheresben	9	Mr J A Fahey	Seamus Fahey
2009	Joncol	6	Ruby Walsh	Paul Nolan
2010	Zaarito	8	Davy Condon	Colm Murphy
2011	Prince Erik	7	Davy Condon	Dermot Weld
2012	Flemenstar	7	Andrew Lynch	Peter Casey
2013	Dedigout	7	Davy Russell	Tony Martin
2014	Bright New Dawn	7	Bryan Cooper	Dessie Hughes
2015	Fine Rightly	7	Davy Russell	Stuart Crawford
2016	Sub Lieutenant	7	David Mullins	Sandra Hughes
2017	Ball D'Arc	6	Bryan Cooper	Gordon Elliott
2018	Meeting abandoned due to waterlogging
2019	Kaiser Black	8	James J Doyle	Pat Doyle
2020	Royal Rendezvous	8	Danny Mullins	Willie Mullins
2021	Conflated	7	Jack Kennedy	Denise Foster
2022	Delvino	7	Richard Deegan	Mark Edmund McCrory
2023	Journey With Me	7	Rachael Blackmore	Henry De Bromhead
2024	Tactical Move	10	Paul Townend	Willie Mullins

== See also ==
- List of Irish National Hunt races
