= Tu Va Stables =

- Type: Thoroughbred Racing Stable & Horse breeding Farm
- Industry: Thoroughbred Horse racing
- Headquarters: County Meath, Ireland
- Key people: Noel Meade
- Website: noelmeade.com

Tu Va Stables in County Meath, Ireland is an Irish thoroughbred horse racing stable and breeding business that was established by Noel Meade, a prominent National Hunt racing horse trainer.

Although he was a trainer, Meade did ride one horse early on in his career, Tu Va. He rode Tu Va to a win in a maiden hurdle in August 1971. Responsible for his first win as a trainer, Meade decided to name his stables after Tu Va.

Tu Va is spread out over 175 acres (0.71 km^{2}). There are a number of different facilities on the stable grounds. There are three different gallops: a six-furlong, all weather gallop; a mile long, all weather gallop; and a mile long, half grass gallop. There is also an indoor gallop that is used as a warm up, especially during the harsh winter months. There is an equine spa on the grounds to help treat the horses to the various injuries that occur during practice. Two horse walkers are present that are used to keep the horses active. There are also schooling facilities for horses, including baby hurdles and fences to regulation hurdles and fences seen during actual races.

Tu Va has three principal jockeys, Paul Carberry, Niall Madden and Paul’s sister, Nina Carberry. The current stable lad is Alan McIlroy, who has spent 13 years at Tu Va. McIlroy and the employees at Tu Va were in line to be the first stable staff to receive part of the £1m Triple Crown of Hurdling bonus offered by WBX. Had Go Native, winner of the 2009 Fighting Fifth Hurdle and Christmas Hurdle, gone on to win the 2010 Champion Hurdle, McIlroy would have received £100,000 and the staff would have received £50,000. However, Go Native struggled early and finished a disappointing 10th out of 12 entries.

Famous horses trained at Tu Va include Harchibald and Go Native.
