= Dunguib =

Irish-bred Thoroughbred racehorse

- Sire: Presenting
- Dam: Edermine Berry
- Damsire: Durgam
- Sex: Gelding
- Foaled: 8 April 2003
- Country: Ireland
- Colour: Bay
- Breeder: Liam Meade
- Owner: Daniel Harnett and Lily Lawlor
- Trainer: Philip Fenton
- Record: 16: 9-1-2
- Earnings: £234,306

Major wins
- Future Champions INH Flat Race (2008); Cheltenham Champion Bumper (2009); Punchestown Champion Bumper (disqualified); Royal Bond Novice Hurdle (2009); Deloitte Novice Hurdle (2010); Boyne Hurdle (2014)
- Last updated on 20 February 2010

Dunguib (foaled 8 April 2003) is an Irish Thoroughbred racehorse who became the second horse to complete the Cheltenham and Punchestown double in 2009 for trainer Philip Fenton and owners Daniel Harnett and Lily Lawlor. However he was later disqualified from his Punchestown Champion Bumper victory

== Background ==
Dunguib was sold by breeder Liam Meade as a foal at the Tattersalls Ireland horse sales in November 2003 to Daniel Harnett and Lily Lawlor, who intended to sell him on as a three-year-old like they had many horses before, including Irish Grand National winner Niche Market.

As they lived near to the town of Killenaule in County Tipperary, both Harnett and Lawlor knew Philip Fenton well as he rode for local trainer Edward O'Grady as an amateur for many years, securing a Cheltenham Festival success for the trainer on Loving Around in the 1996 National Hunt Chase. Both told Fenton that if their son of Presenting was not sold on then they would put him in training at his Carrick On Suir base in the neighbouring county of Waterford.

The name Dunguib comes from a small townland outside the village Killenaule of the same name.

== Racing career ==
=== 2008/9: National Hunt Flat races ===
Dunguib had his first racing start at the 2008 Punchestown Festival where he was beaten by On Raglan Road in a National Hunt flat race. He went on to win his next two starts in National Hunt flat races, including the Grade 2 Future Champ INH Flat Race. After that convincing victory, Dunguib was moved to the highest level to contest the Champion Bumper at the 2009 Cheltenham Festival, a race Harnett and Lawlor had dreamed of winning for some time.

Under amateur rider Brian O'Connell, his only rider to date, Dunguib stayed on strongly up the Cheltenham hill to beat Some Present and Rite Of Passage with ease. Having landed his first Grade 1 connections were quick to win another naming the Punchestown Champion Bumper as his next target and gave him a short break before producing him in top condition that April. Dunguib finished first, but was later found to have been running with a banned substance in his system and was disqualified, awarding the race to the second home Sweeps Hill.

=== 2009/10: Novice Hurdles ===
==== Before Cheltenham ====
Fenton had schooled Dunguib over hurdles before his Punchestown run and gave him his first start over those obstacles in October 2009 at Galway. Conditions were very testing, but the competition was not strong and the six-year-old won by four lengths, once again in the hands of O'Connell. Connections had wanted to go straight to the Royal Bond Novice Hurdle after this race using a racecourse gallop at Thurles as a preparation. This plan was changed however, when Thurles became waterlogged by excessive levels of rain and Dunguib was taken to Punchestown for another hurdle race. In similar style to his first run of the season, Dunguib won by several lengths with virtually no urgings from O'Connell.

Dunguib's next test was to be his most challenging so far. A return to Grade 1 action for the Royal Bond Novice Hurdle at Fairyhouse was planned and preparations were going well, but a freak rain storm waterlogged Fairyhouse on the Sunday of the big race, forcing its abandonment. Horse Racing Ireland worked quickly to ensure the day, which was also set to feature the Hatton's Grace Hurdle and Drinmore Novice Chase, was saved, moving the entire card to the following Wednesday and the course's original fixture set for that date to the next Thursday (10 December). Still, the opposition was no match for Dunguib and he went seven lengths clear of Some Present to record another win. Afterwards, Fenton was considering a run at the Future Champions Novice Hurdle at Leopardstown because his star had won so easily again, but all concerned decided to stick with their original plan and Dunguib was rested until the Deloitte Novice Hurdle in February.

He won this without being pressured, but made several jumping errors. These did not harm him though and he was described by Fenton as "bright as a button" the following day.

That contest was his final preparation for the Supreme Novices' Hurdle at the Cheltenham Festival in March 2010.

==== Cheltenham and After ====
Despite widespread anticipation that Dunguib would win the opening race of the 2010 Cheltenham Festival the horse failed to live up to expectations on the day. Sent to post an odd-on favourite at a price of 4/5, Dunguib was ridden wide throughout the 2 mile, Grade 1 race by jockey Brian O'Connell. This may have been a deliberate tactic to give the horse a clear view of the hurdles. His prospects were not helped by the slow pace of the race which ensured that almost a dozen horses were in contention turning into the straight. This forced the horse even wider on the track and serious ground was lost. Despite quickening up the Cheltenham hill, O'Connell and Dunguib were unable to catch the Philip Hobbs trained Menorah, ridden by Richard Johnson, with Get Me Out Of Here a close second.

Immediately after the race, some commentators were quick to criticise jockey Brian O'Connell, claiming he was too inexperienced to ride the horse in such a high-profile event. Channel 4 commentator John McCririck called for O’Connell to be sacked after riding the horse. However, such a comment was not taken well by other jockeys and McCririck came under immediate attack from many others ridding at the Festival who jumped to the defense of O’Connell with Davy Russell demanding an apology saying "John McCririck doesn’t know one end of the horse from the other. I would have been insulted by the comments said on the television. He wasn’t the best horse on the day and if you lost your money you should take it on the chin. I would like a public apology from him (McCririck)."

The official distances were a head and one and three quarter lengths. The form of the race has looked better in retrospect, with both Menorah and the fourth placed Oscar Whisky going on to win Grade I races.

Dunguib suffered the second defeat of his career at the Punchestown Festival in April 2010. Again sent off favourite, at a price of 5/2, the Philip Fenton novice was only able to finish eighth behind a top class field in the Grade 1 event. Hurricane Fly, the future Champion Hurdler went on to win the race at a price of 3–1.

=== 2010/11 season ===
Dunguib's 2010–2011 campaign was seriously disrupted due to a combination of illness and inclement weather. A harsh Irish winter ensured an almost blanket cancellation of all racing during November and December due to heavy rain, frozen ground and snowfalls. All three ensured, that despite being entered in various races, Philip Fenton's horse would not run again in 2010. Dunguib's long-awaited re-appearance did not occur until February 2011 when he was sent off an 8-11 favourite in the three-horse-race, Red Mills Trial Hurdle at Gowran. Dunguib travelled well throughout the race and came through to challenge leader Luska Lad for the lead two hurdles from home. Once taking the lead, the race was never in doubt, with the official winning distance being three and a half lengths with Gimli's Rock seven lengths back in third.

At the 2011 Cheltenham Festival, Dunguib failed to produce his best form on good ground in the Champion Hurdle, finishing eighth of the eleven runners behind Hurricane Fly.

=== 2013/14 season ===
Dunguib missed the next two seasons with leg injuries. In January 2014, Dunguib began his comeback and finished third to Rule the World in the Grade III Limestone Lad Hurdle at Naas. On 16 February, the gelding recorded his first win in three years when he easily defeated the 5/4 favourite Zaidpour by six lengths in the Grade II Boyne Hurdle at Navan. When asked if the gelding was better that ever, Fenton replied "He could be, even though he is not getting any younger". On 12 March, Dunguib carried top weight of 166 pounds in the Coral Cup over two miles five furlongs at the Cheltenham Festival. He was never travelling well and was pulled up by O'Connell before the third last. He reportedly finished lame.

== Racing results ==
- Racing Post:
  - 26 April 2008, 15 November 2008, 14 December 2008, 11 March 2009, 29 April 2009, 25 October 2009, 14 November 2009, 2 December 2009, 7 February 2010,

16 March 2010, 23 April 2010, 19 February 2011, 15 March 2011, 18 January 2014, 16 February 2014, 12 March 2014
