= Royal Bond Novice Hurdle =

Hurdle horse race in Ireland

- Class: Grade 2
- Location: Fairyhouse; County Meath, Ireland
- Inaugurated: 1994
- Race type: Hurdle race
- Sponsor: Bar One Racing
- Website: Fairyhouse

Race information
- Distance: 2 miles (3,219 metres)
- Surface: Turf
- Track: Right-handed
- Qualification: Four-years-old and up
- Weight: 11 st 7 lb (4yo); 11 st 10 lb (5yo+); Allowances; 7 lb for fillies and mares
- Purse: €70,000 (2020); 1st: €41,300

Royal Bond Novice Hurdle
2025
Koktail Brut	Blake	The Passing Wife

Previous years
2024
Tounsivator	Romeo Coolio	Sea Of Sands
2023
Farren Glory	King Of Kingsfield	An Tobar
2022
Marine Nationale	Irish Point	Ashroe Diamond
2021
Statuaire	My Mate Mozzie	Mighty Potter

2020-2011
2020
Ballyadam	Cask Mate	N'golo
2019
Envoi Allen	Abacadabras	Darver Star
2018
Quick Grabim	Triplicate	Aramon
2017
Mengli Khan	Early Doors	Hardline
2016
Airlie Beach	Saturnas	Le Martalin
2015
Long Dog	Bachasson	Gunnery Sergeant
2014
Nichols Canyon	All Hell Let Loose	Princely Conn
2013
The Tullow Tank	Renneti	Arctic Fire
2012
Jezki	Champagne Fever	Zuzka
2011
Sous Les Cieux	Galileo's Choice	Miss Nomer

2010-2001
2010
Zaidpour	Pineau De Re	Perfect Smile
2009
Dunguib	Some Present	Alice Bradys Call
2008
Hurricane Fly	Donnas Palm	Cousin Vinny
2007
Muirhead	Cork All Star	Whatuthink
2006
Hide The Evidence	Clopf	Cleni Boy
2005
Iktitaf	O'Muircheartaigh	Mounthenry
2004
Wild Passion	Rocket Ship	Royal Paradise
2003
Newmill	Mariah Rollins	Strike Back
2002
Hardy Eustace	Back In Front	Macs Valley
2001
Like-A-Butterfly	Sacundai	Best Wait

2000-1994
2000
Liss A Paoraigh	Penny Rich	Rua Lass
1999
Moscow Flyer	Stage Affair	Vanilla Man
1998
Alexander Banquet	Cardinal Hill	To Your Honour
1997
Feathered Leader	Promalee	Cloone Bridge
1996
Istabraq	Palette	Noble Thyne
1995
Thats My Man	Lamero	Dance Beat
1994
Gambolling Doc	Ventana Canyon	Major Rumpus

The Royal Bond Novice Hurdle is a Grade 2 National Hunt hurdle race in Ireland which is open to horses aged four years or older. It is run at Fairyhouse over a distance of about 2 miles (3,219 metres), and during its running there are ten hurdles to be jumped. The race is for novice hurdlers, and it is scheduled to take place each year in late November or early December.

The event is named after Royal Bond, a successful National Hunt horse trained by Arthur Moore in the early 1980s. It was established in 1994, and held Grade 1 status until 2023. It is usually staged on the same afternoon as the Drinmore Novice Chase and the Hatton's Grace Hurdle.

== Records ==
Leading jockey (4 wins):

- Charlie Swan – Thats My Man (1995), Istabraq (1996), Liss A Paoraigh (2000), Like-a-Butterfly (2001)
- Paul Carberry – Gambolling Doc (1994), Wild Passion (2004), Iktitaf (2005), Muirhead (2007)
- Ruby Walsh - Alexander Banquet (1998), Sous les Cieux (2011), Long Dog (2015), Quick Grabim (2018)
- Danny Mullins - The Tullow Tank (2013), Airlie Beach (2016), Statuaire (2021), Tounsivator (2024)
- Jack Kennedy - Mengli Khan (2017), Ballyadam (2020), Farren Glory (2023), Koktail Brut (2025)

Leading trainer (10 wins):

- Willie Mullins - Alexander Banquet (1998), Hurricane Fly (2008), Zaidpour (2010), Sous les Cieux (2011), Nichols Canyon (2014), Long Dog (2015), Airlie Beach (2016), Quick Grabim (2018), Statuaire (2021), Tounsivator (2024)

== Winners ==
Year	Winner	Age	Jockey	Trainer
1994	Gambolling Doc	4	Paul Carberry	Paddy Mullins
1995	Thats My Man	5	Charlie Swan	Aidan O'Brien
1996	Istabraq	4	Charlie Swan	Aidan O'Brien
1997	Feathered Leader	5	Conor O'Dwyer	Arthur Moore
1998	Alexander Banquet	5	Ruby Walsh	Willie Mullins
1999	Moscow Flyer	5	Barry Geraghty	Jessica Harrington
2000	Liss A Paoraigh	5	Charlie Swan	John Kiely
2001	Like-A-Butterfly	7	Charlie Swan	Christy Roche
2002	Hardy Eustace	5	Kieran Kelly	Dessie Hughes
2003	Newmill	5	Garrett Cotter	Thomas Gerard O'Leary
2004	Wild Passion	4	Paul Carberry	Noel Meade
2005	Iktitaf	4	Paul Carberry	Noel Meade
2006	Hide the Evidence	5	Andrew Leigh	Jessica Harrington
2007	Muirhead	4	Paul Carberry	Noel Meade
2008	Hurricane Fly	4	Paul Townend	Willie Mullins
2009	Dunguib	6	Brian O'Connell	Philip Fenton
2010	Zaidpour	4	Paul Townend	Willie Mullins
2011	Sous les Cieux	5	Ruby Walsh	Willie Mullins
2012	Jezki	4	Barry Geraghty	Jessica Harrington
2013	The Tullow Tank	5	Danny Mullins	Philip Fenton
2014	Nichols Canyon	4	Paul Townend	Willie Mullins
2015	Long Dog	5	Ruby Walsh	Willie Mullins
2016	Airlie Beach	6	Danny Mullins	Willie Mullins
2017	Mengli Khan	4	Jack Kennedy	Gordon Elliott
2018	Quick Grabim	6	Ruby Walsh	Willie Mullins
2019	Envoi Allen	5	Davy Russell	Gordon Elliott
2020	Ballyadam	5	Jack Kennedy	Gordon Elliott
2021	Statuaire	6	Danny Mullins	Willie Mullins
2022	Marine Nationale	5	Michael O'Sullivan	Barry Connell
2023	Farren Glory	6	Jack Kennedy	Gordon Elliott
2024	Tounsivator	5	Danny Mullins	Willie Mullins
2025	Koktail Brut	5	Jack Kennedy	Gordon Elliott

== See also ==
- Horse racing in Ireland
- List of Irish National Hunt races
