= Weapon's Amnesty =

Irish-bred Thoroughbred racehorse

Weapon’s Amnesty
- Weapons Amnesty and jockey Davy Russell in a Novice Chase on WBX Fighting Fifth Hurdle Day
- Sire: Presenting
- Grandsire: Mtoto
- Dam: Victoria Theatre
- Damsire: Old Vic
- Sex: Gelding
- Foaled: 2003
- Country: Ireland
- Colour: Chestnut
- Breeder: Gigginstown House Stud
- Owner: Aaron Metcalfe
- Trainer: Charles Byrnes
- Record: 5-4-1
- Earnings: £216,848

Major wins
- Spa Novices' Hurdle (2009); RSA Chase (2010)

Weapon's Amnesty (foaled on 17 February 2003 in Ireland) is an Irish thoroughbred racehorse. He retired in January 2013.

== Background ==
He was sired by Presenting out of the mare, Victoria Theatre. He is owned by Aaron Metcalfe and is trained by Charles Byrnes. Weapon's Amnesty was bred by Gigginstown House Stud, a horse breeding outfit owned by Michael O'Leary, the CEO of the Ryanair. Throughout his time as a racehorse, his primary jockey has been Davy Russell. As of May 2010, Weapon's Amnesty has amassed a career record of 5 wins, 4 places and 1 show while accumulating £216,848 in lifetime earnings in just 14 races.

== Racing career ==
=== Hurdling ===
Weapon's Amnesty started racing as a four-year-old in January 2008 when he was entered into the Templemore I.N.H. Flat Race, finishing in 2nd place out of 17 entries – losing to Oscar Time by just a half of a length. He made his hurdling debut later that year in November during the I.N.H. Stallion Owners European Breeders Fund Novice Hurdle, a race in which he finished well off the lead runner. He won his first race, the Gowran Park Racing Club 2009 Maiden Hurdle, in December 2008 at Gowran Park in County Kilkenny, Ireland. In that race, he beat a field of 20 horses to earn his first victory.

His first notable win came in the 2009 Spa Novices' Hurdle, a Grade 1 National Hunt race held at Cheltenham Racecourse in Cheltenham, Gloucestershire during the Cheltenham Festival. In that race, Weapon's Amnesty held off 17 other competitors, including jockey Ruby Walsh on Pride of Dulcote, whom he narrowly beat by a half of a length. After the win, Davy Russell said of Weapon's Amnesty: I was definitely on the best horse in the race and didn't want to hit the front too soon. Charles has done a fantastic job with this horse, because he is not the easiest to train. He's a big-framed horse and a chaser in the making.

=== Steeplechasing ===
Weapon's Amnesty's other Grade 1 win came in the 2010 RSA Chase, also held during the Cheltenham Festival. There, he entered the race at 10-1 and dominated the field of nine to win by 7 lengths over Burton Port.
