= BetVictor Champion Chase =

Steeplechase horse race in Ireland

- Class: Grade 1
- Location: Down Royal, County Down; Northern Ireland
- Inaugurated: 1999
- Race type: Chase
- Sponsor: BetVictor
- Website: Down Royal

Race information
- Distance: 3 miles (4,828 metres)
- Surface: Turf
- Track: Right-handed
- Qualification: Five-years-old and up
- Weight: 11 st 10 lb Allowances; 7 lb for mares
- Purse: €125,000 (2020); 1st: €73,750

Ladbrokes Champion Chase
2026
Haiti Couleurs	Fleur In The Park	Banbridge

Previous years
2025
Envoi Allen	Affordale Fury	Western Fold
2024
Envoi Allen	Hewick	Gerri Colombe
2023
Gerri Colombe	Envoi Allen	Conflated
2022
Envoi Allen	Kemboy	Conflated
2021
Frodon	Galvin	Minella Indo

2020-2011
2020
The Storyteller	Chris's Dream	Tout Est Permis
2019
Road To Respect	Clan Des Obeaux	Alpha Des Obeaux
2018
Road To Respect	Woodland Opera	Outlander
2017
Outlander	Road To Respect	Zabana
2016
Valseur Lido	Silviniaco Conti	Lord Scoundrel
2015
Don Cossack	Rocky Creek	Roi Du Mee
2014
Road To Riches	Rocky Creek	Boston Bob
2013
Roi Du Mee	Sizing Europe	Prince De Beauchene
2012
Kauto Stone	First Lieutenant	Quito De La Roque
2011
Quito De La Roque	Sizing Europe	The Nightingale

2010-2001
2010
Kauto Star	Sizing Europe	China Rock
2009
The Listener	My Will	War Of Attrition
2008
Kauto Star	Light On The Broom	Knight Legend
2007
Taranis	Justified	Light On The Broom
2006
Beef Or Salmon	War Of Attrition	Justified
2004
Beef Or Salmon	Kicking King	Cloudy Bays
2003
Glenelly Gale	Arctic Copper	Barrow Drive
2002
More Than A Stroll	See More Business	Give Over
2001
Foxchapel King	Wicked Crack	Florida Pearl

2000-1999
2000
Looks Like Trouble	Dorans Pride	Inis Cara
1999
Florida Pearl	Dorans Pride	Ferbet Junior

The BetVictor Champion Chase is a Grade 1 National Hunt chase in Northern Ireland which is open to horses aged five years or older. It is run at Down Royal, Lisburn over a distance of about 3 miles (4,828 metres), and during its running there are fifteen fences to be jumped. The race is scheduled to take place each year in late October or early November.

The event was established in 1999, and it was initially contested over 3 miles and 1 furlong. It was cut to its present distance in 2000, and given Grade 1 status in 2002.

The BetVictor Champion Chase is now the first Grade 1 event of the Irish National Hunt season. It was sponsored by JNwine.com (James Nicholson Wine Merchant) from its inception until the 2018 running. Ladbrokes took over the sponsorship in 2019. The race has been sponsored by BetVictor since 2025.

== Records ==
Most successful horse (3 wins):

- Envoi Allen - 2022, 2024, 2025

Leading jockey (4 wins):

- Ruby Walsh – Taranis (2007), Kauto Star (2008, 2010), Valseur Lido (2016)

Leading trainer (5 wins):

- Paul Nicholls – Taranis (2007), Kauto Star (2008, 2010), Kauto Stone (2012), Frodon (2021)
- Gordon Elliott - Roi du Mee (2013), Don Cossack (2015), Outlander (2017), The Storyteller (2020), Gerri Colombe (2023)

== Winners ==
Winner	Winner	Age	Jockey	Trainer
1999	Florida Pearl	7	Paul Carberry	Willie Mullins
2000	Looks Like Trouble	8	Richard Johnson	Noel Chance
2001	Foxchapel King	8	David Casey	Mouse Morris
2002	More Than a Stroll	10	Conor O'Dwyer	Arthur Moore
2003	Glenelly Gale	9	Conor O'Dwyer	Arthur Moore
2004	Beef Or Salmon	8	Timmy Murphy	Michael Hourigan
	no race 2005 (Note: The 2005 edition was abandoned after bomb warnings were telephoned to the racecourse.)
2006	Beef Or Salmon	10	Andrew McNamara	Michael Hourigan
2007	Taranis	6	Ruby Walsh	Paul Nicholls
2008	Kauto Star	8	Ruby Walsh	Paul Nicholls
2009	The Listener	10	Andrew McNamara	Nick Mitchell
2010	Kauto Star	10	Ruby Walsh	Paul Nicholls
2011	Quito de la Roque	7	Davy Russell	Colm Murphy
2012	Kauto Stone	6	Daryl Jacob	Paul Nicholls
2013	Roi du Mee	8	Bryan Cooper	Gordon Elliott
2014	Road to Riches	7	Paul Carberry	Noel Meade
2015	Don Cossack	8	Bryan Cooper	Gordon Elliott
2016	Valseur Lido	7	Ruby Walsh	Henry de Bromhead
2017	Outlander	9	Jack Kennedy	Gordon Elliott
2018	Road to Respect	7	Sean Flanagan	Noel Meade
2019	Road to Respect	8	Sean Flanagan	Noel Meade
2020	The Storyteller	9	Keith Donoghue	Gordon Elliott
2021	Frodon	9	Bryony Frost	Paul Nicholls
2022	Envoi Allen	8	Rachael Blackmore	Henry de Bromhead
2023	Gerri Colombe	7	Jack Kennedy	Gordon Elliott
2024	Envoi Allen	10	Darragh O'Keeffe	Henry de Bromhead
2025	Envoi Allen	11	Darragh O'Keeffe	Henry de Bromhead
2026	Haiti Couleurs	9	Paul Townend	Rebecca Curtis

== See also ==
- Horse racing in Ireland
- List of Irish National Hunt races
