= Docado Syndicate =

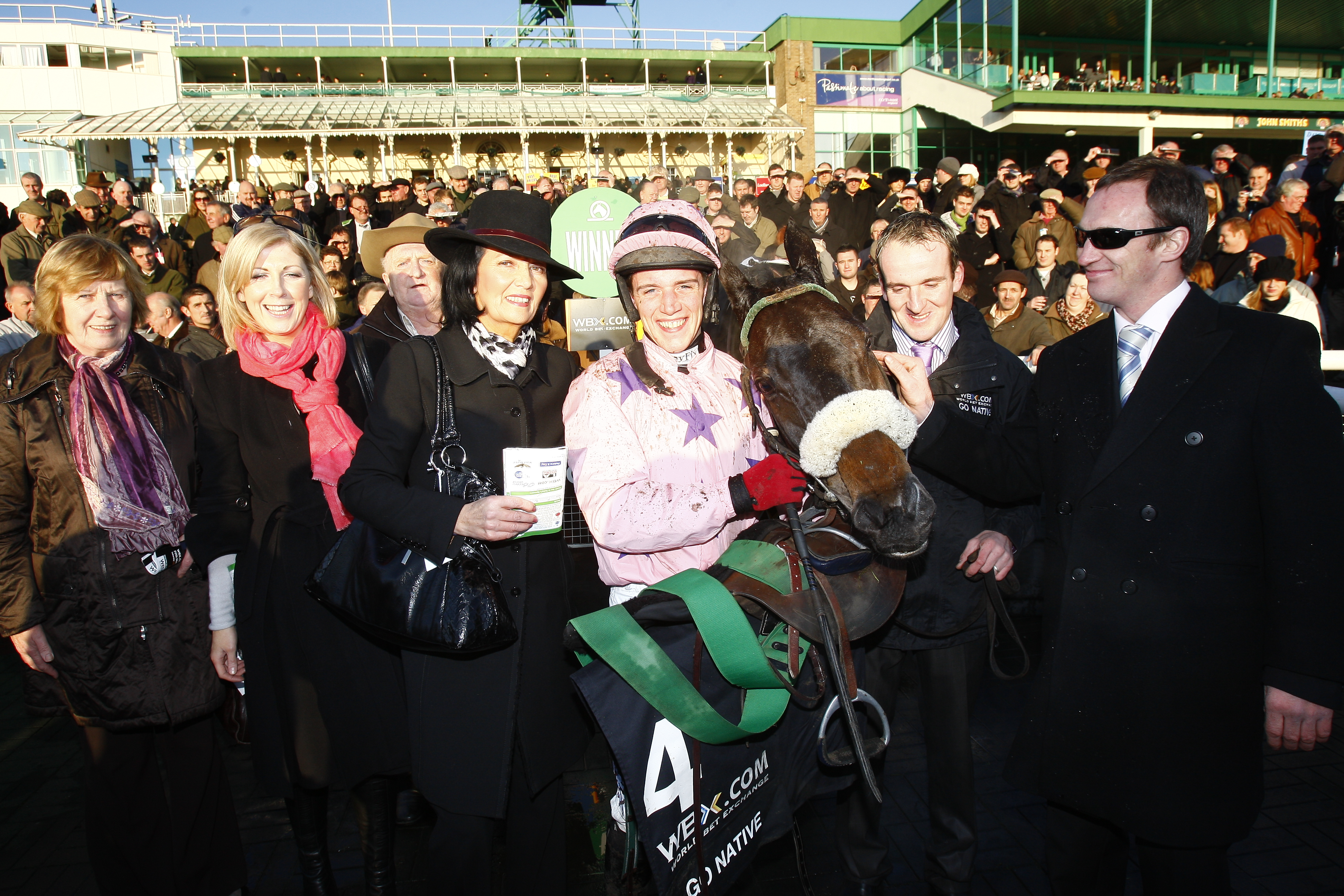
Members of the Docado Syndicate at the winner's presentation for the 2009 Fighting Fifth Hurdle.

The Docado Syndicate is a six person horse racing ownership group from Ireland. The syndicate includes Eamon Doyle and Kitty Carr, owners of the Park House Hotel in Galway City for the past 34 years. Doyle and Carr are also the owners of the Galway Restaurant, also located in Galway City. Along with Doyle and Carr, the Docado Syndicate ownership group also includes Carr’s sister Maura, her husband Sylvie Dowd and their children Tom and Ann Marie. The Syndicate’s name, Docado, is formed by using the first two letters of the principal owners’ last names: DOwd, CArr, DOwd.

The Docado Syndicate is the owner of Go Native, who is trained by Noel Meade. Go Native was purchased by Doyle and Carr three years ago for £25,000 from one of their regular customers, well known horse dealer, Martin Cullinane of Athenry, Ireland. He is the only horse owned by group.

In reference to Go Native, Carr was quoted as saying: "We had been talking about buying a horse for a year before we approached Martin Cullinane about it. He kept an eye out for a good one for us and, about three years ago, we bought Go Native." Since their purchase, Go Native has won seven races and placed second in three, accumulating £310,254 in winnings. Three of Go Native's seven wins have come in Grade 1 National Hunt races.

After winning the Fighting Fifth Hurdle and Christmas Hurdle, Docado’s Go Native became the only horse to win the first two legs of the Triple Crown of Hurdling since it was established in 2006. Needing only the Champion Hurdle to complete the treble and collect the £1m bonus put up by WBX, Go Native went on to finish a disappointing 10th out of 12 entries.

The group considers their purchase and racing of horses as a hobby.

== Major Race Wins ==
- Go Native : (Supreme Novices' Hurdle - 2009)
- Go Native : (Fighting Fifth Hurdle - 2009)
- Go Native : (Christmas Hurdle - 2009)
