= Envoi Allen =

French-bred Thoroughbred racehorse (2014–2026)

- Racing Colours of owner Cheveley Park Stud
- Sire: Muhtathir
- Dam: Reaction
- Damsire: Saint Des Saints
- Sex: Gelding
- Foaled: 16 February 2014
- Died: 13 March 2026 (aged 12)
- Country: France
- Colour: Bay
- Breeder: Bruno Vagne
- Owner: Cheveley Park Stud
- Trainer: Henry de Bromhead
- Record: 31:17-2-4
- Earnings: £1,117,315

Major wins
- Champion Bumper (2019); Royal Bond Novice Hurdle (2019); Lawlor's of Naas Novice Hurdle (2020); Ballymore Novices' Hurdle; Drinmore Novice Chase (2022); Killiney Novice Chase; Paddy's Reward Club Chase (2022); Ladbrokes Champion Chase (2022, 2024, 2025); Ryanair Chase (2023)

Envoi Allen (16 February 2014 – 13 March 2026) was a French thoroughbred racehorse competing in National Hunt racing.

The bay gelding was bred in France and first raced in Ireland in a point to point at Ballinaboola where he won by 10 lengths.

Envoi Allen was sold at the Tattersalls Ireland Cheltenham February Sale for £400,000. Bloodstock agent Tom Malone purchased the horse on behalf of David and Patricia Thompson of Cheveley Park Stud.

Trained by Gordon Elliott in Ireland, Envoi Allen won his first 11 races under rules. This included victories at the Cheltenham Festival in two Grade 1s, winning the 2019 Champion Bumper under amateur jockey Jamie Codd, and the 2020 Ballymore Novices' Hurdle under Davy Russell.

In Ireland, he won three Grade 1 races: the 2019 Royal Bond Novice Hurdle and the 2020 Lawlor's of Naas Novice Hurdle, both times ridden by Russell, and the 2020 Drinmore Novice Chase, ridden by Jack Kennedy.

In March 2021, training was switched from Gordon Elliott to Henry De Bromhead. He got off to a poor start in his new yard as he fell in the Marsh Chase at Cheltenham in March 2021 and the following month was pulled up in the Dooley Insurance Champion Novice Chase at Punchestown, when he was ridden for the first time by Rachael Blackmore, who became his regular jockey until her retirement in May 2025. It was later revealed he had suffered an injury early in the race. After the summer break, he returned in October 2021 to victory in a Grade 2 Chase at Down Royal. In December 2021, he was unplaced in the John Durkan Memorial Punchestown Chase before winning the Grade 1 Paddy's Reward Club Chase at Leopardstown three weeks later. The season finished with defeats in the Queen Mother Champion Chase at Cheltenham and the Punchestown Champion Chase.

Envoi Allen ran four times in the 2022–23 season, winning the Grade 1 Ladbrokes Champion Chase at Down Royal and the Ryanair Chase at the Cheltenham Festival. In the 2023–24, he ran four times but did not win, coming second in both the races he had won the previous season. The following season, he ran three times, winning the 2024 Ladbrokes Champion Chase under Darragh O'Keeffe, unseating Blackmore in the King George VI Chase at Kempton, and coming third in the Ryanair Chase.

The 2025–26 season began with a record third win in the BetVictor (formerly Ladbrokes) Champion Chase on 1 November 2025. The 12 year old was then entered in the Cheltenham Gold Cup on 13 March 2026. He finished last of the nine finishers and collapsed and died on the chute on his way to the unsaddling enclosure. He had been due to retire after the race.
