= Slaney Novice Hurdle =

Hurdle horse race in Ireland

Lawlor's of Naas Novice Hurdle
2026
I'll Sort That	Sortudo	Fruit De Mer

Previous years
2025
The Yellow Clay	Supersundae	Wingmen
2024
Readin Tommy Wrong	Ile Atlantique	Lecky Watson
2023
Champ Kiely	Irish Point	Dawn Rising
2022
Ginto	Grand Jury	Hollow Games
2021
Bob Olinger	Blue Lord	Gabynako

2020-2011
2020
Envoi Allen	Elixir D'Ainay	Longhouse Poet
2019
Battleoverdoyen	Sams Profile	Getareason
2018
Next Destination	Cracking Smart	Duc Des Genievres
2017
Death Duty	Turcagua	Blood Crazed Tiger
2016
Bellshill	Last Encounter	Anibale Fly
2015
Mckinley	Tell Us More	Free Expression
2014
Briar Hill	Apache Jack	Very Wood
2013
Rule The World	Minsk	Champagne Fever
2012
Monksland	Lyreen Legend	Dedigout
2011
Gagewell Flyer	Fists Of Fury	Pineau De Re

2010-2001
2009
Mikael D'haguenet	Western Charmer	Clan Tara
2008
Venalmar	Trafford Lad	Woodbine Willie
2007
Kazal	Earth Magic	Casey Jones
2006
Toofarback	Vic Venturi	Merdeka
2005
Homer Wells	Sweet Kiln	Petertheknot
2004
McGruders Cross	Away Home	Kildare
2002
Canary Wharf	Thari	Over The Bar
2001
Risk Accessor	Bob Justice	Bob What

2000-1991
2000
Champagne Native	No Discount	Kirmar
1999
Glazeaway	Sallie's Girl	Empor Star
1998
Promalee	Liathmore Abbey	Pride Of Tipperary
1996
Rifawan	Castlekellyleader	Minella Gold
1995
Ventana Canyon	Glint Of Eagles	Bless Me Sister
1994
Minella Lad	Court Melody	Beglawella
1993
Bucks-Choice	Bayrouge	Slaney Special
1992
Irish Peace	Kilcash	Eyelid
1991
Nordic Surprise	Glitter Grey	More Of It

1990-1989
1990
Scally Owen	Be Seeing You	Shuil Ogue
1989
Have A Barney	Potential Pin	No Fadhb

The Slaney Novice Hurdle, currently known for sponsorship purposes as the Lawlor's of Naas Novice Hurdle, is a Grade One National Hunt hurdle race in Ireland. It is run in January at Naas Racecourse, over a distance of about 2 miles and 4 furlongs (4,023 metres) and during its running there are 11 flights of hurdles to be jumped. The race is often contested by horses who go on to compete at the Cheltenham Festival, such as the 1978 winner, Golden Cygnet, who went on to win the Supreme Novices' Hurdle and 2021 winner, Bob Olinger, who went on to win the Ballymore Properties Novices' Hurdle.

The race was run over 2 miles and 3 furlongs until 1995. It was awarded Grade 3 status in 1993, raised to Grade 2 in 2005 and then to Grade 1 in 2015. The race is currently sponsored by Lawlor's Hotel.

== Records ==
Leading jockey since 1983 (4 wins):

- Ruby Walsh – Homer Wells (2005), Mikael D'haguenet (2009), Briar Hill (2014), Bellshill (2016)

Leading trainer since 1983 (9 wins):

- Willie Mullins - Homer Wells (2005), Mikael D'haguenet (2009), Gagewell Flyer (2011), Briar Hill (2014), Mckinley (2015), Bellshill (2016), Next Destination (2018), Champ Kiely (2023), Readin Tommy Wrong (2024)

== Winners since 1983 ==
Year	Winner	Age	Jockey	Trainer
1983	Stag Hill	6	Tommy Carmody	J Durkan
1984	Straight Air	6	Colin Magnier (Note: amateur jockey)	Michael Cunningham
1985	Abandoned
1986	Regular Time	5	Tom Taaffe	Syl Kirk
1987	Flying Trove	6	Tom Taaffe	Arthur Moore
1988	Abandoned
1989	Have A Barney	8	Tom Taaffe	Arthur Moore
1990	Scally Owen	6	Tony Mullins	Paddy Mullins
1991	Nordic Surprise	4	E J Kearns Jnr	Jim Bolger
1992	Irish Peace	4	Tommy Carmody	Liam Browne
1993	Bucks-Choice	6	Tony Mullins	Paddy Mullins
1994	Minella Lad	8	T Horgan	Aidan O'Brien
1995	Ventana Canyon	6	Charlie Swan	Edward O'Grady
1996	Rifawan	5	F Woods	Arthur Moore
1997	Abandoned
1998	Promalee	6	Richard Dunwoody	Aidan O'Brien
1999	Glazeaway	6	Conor O'Dwyer	Michael J O'Connor
2000	Champagne Native	6	Jason Titley	Tom Taaffe
2001	Risk Accessor	6	Charlie Swan	Christy Roche
2002	Canary Wharf	6	Barry Geraghty	John Bleahen
2003	Abandoned
2004	McGruders Cross	6	Shay Barry	Tony Mullins
2005	Homer Wells	7	Ruby Walsh	Willie Mullins
2006	Toofarback	6	Niall Madden	Noel Meade
2007	Kazal	6	Barry Geraghty	Eoin Griffin
2008	Venalmar	6	Paddy Flood	Mouse Morris
2009	Mikael D'haguenet	5	Ruby Walsh	Willie Mullins
2010	Abandoned
2011	Gagewell Flyer	7	Emmet Mullins	Willie Mullins
2012	Monksland	5	Paul Carberry	Noel Meade
2013	Rule The World	6	Davy Russell	Mouse Morris
2014	Briar Hill	6	Ruby Walsh	Willie Mullins
2015	Mckinley	5	Paul Townend	Willie Mullins
2016	Bellshill	6	Ruby Walsh	Willie Mullins
2017	Death Duty	6	Jack Kennedy	Gordon Elliott
2018	Next Destination	6	Paul Townend	Willie Mullins
2019	Battleoverdoyen	6	Jack Kennedy	Gordon Elliott
2020	Envoi Allen	6	Davy Russell	Gordon Elliott
2021	Bob Olinger	6	Rachael Blackmore	Henry de Bromhead
2022	Ginto	6	Jack Kennedy	Gordon Elliott
2023	Champ Kiely	7	Danny Mullins	Willie Mullins
2024	Readin Tommy Wrong	6	Daryl Jacob	Willie Mullins
2025	The Yellow Clay	6	Sam Ewing	Gordon Elliott
2026	I'll Sort That	6	Declan Queally	Declan Queally

== See also ==
- Horse racing in Ireland
- List of Irish National Hunt races
