= Fort Leney Novice Chase =

Steeplechase horse race in Ireland

Neville Hotels Novice Chase
2024
Croke Park	Better Days Ahead	Buddy One

Previous years
2023
Grangeclare West	Corbetts Cross	Flooring Porter
2022
Gaillard Du Mesnil	Churchstonewarrior	Frontal Assault
2021
Fury Road	Run Wild Fred	Vanillier

2020-2011
2020
Monkfish	Latest Exhibition	Conflated
2019
Battleoverdoyen	Champagne Classic	Lord Schnitzel
2018
Delta Work	Mortal	Blow By Blow
2017
Shattered Love	Jury Duty	Bon Papa
2016
Our Duke	Coney Island	Disko
2015
No More Heroes	Rule The World	Monksland
2014
Don Poli	Apache Stronghold	Lots Of Memories
2013
Carlingford Lough	Morning Assembly	Foxrock
2012
Back In Focus	Aupcharlie	Texas Jack
2011
Last Instalment	First Lieutenant	Allee Garde

2010-2003
2010
Bostons Angel	Quito De La Roque	Western Charmer
2009
Pandorama	Weapon's Amnesty	Catch Me
2008
Casey Jones	Trafford Lad	Siegemaster
2007
Notre Pere	Abbeybraney	Callherwhatulike
2006
Cailin Alainn	Patsy Hall	Anothercoppercoast
2005
Southern Vic	Homer Wells	Tumbling Dice
2004
Forget The Past	Leading The Way	Mutineer
2003
Pizarro	Rosslea	Hi Cloy

The Fort Leney Novice Chase, currently run as the Racing Post Long Distance Novice Chase, is a Grade 1 National Hunt steeplechase in Ireland. It is run over a distance of 3 miles (4,828 metres) at Leopardstown and during its running there are 17 fences to be jumped. It takes place annually during the Christmas Festival meeting.

The race was previously run as a Grade 3 and Grade 2 race, before being awarded Grade 1 status in 2003. The 2014 race was run as the Topaz Novice Chase. From 2015 to 2013 it was sponsored by Neville Hotels and usually took place on 29 December. In 2024 the Racing Post took over the sponsorship and the race was moved to Saint Stephen's Day.

== Records ==
Leading jockey (3 wins):

- Davy Russell – Cailin Alainn (2006), Delta Work (2018), Battleoverdoyen (2019)
- Paul Townend - Monkfish (2020), Gaillard Du Mesnil (2022), Grangeclare West (2023)

Leading trainer (6 wins):

- Gordon Elliott – No More Heroes (2015), Shattered Love (2017), Delta Work (2018), Battleoverdoyen (2019), Fury Road (2021), Croke Park (2024)

== Winners since 1996 ==
Year	Winner	Jockey	Trainer
1996	Dorans Pride	Shane Broderick	Michael Hourigan
1997	Boss Doyle	Tony McCoy	Mouse Morris
1998	Nick Dundee	Norman Williamson	Edward O'Grady
1999	Saxophone	Tom Treacy	Jim Dreaper
2000	Over The Furze	Conor O'Dwyer	John Berry
2001	Give Over	David Casey	Edward Hales
2002	Be My Belle	Timmy Murphy	Sean Treacy
2003	Pizarro	Barry Geraghty	Edward O'Grady
2004	Forget The Past	Denis Cullen (Note: amateur jockey)	Michael O'Brien
2005	Southern Vic	Ruby Walsh	Ted Walsh
2006	Cailin Alainn	Davy Russell	Charles Byrnes
2007	Notre Pere	Andrew Lynch	Jim Dreaper
2008	Casey Jones	Paul Carberry	Noel Meade
2009	Pandorama	Davy Condon	Noel Meade
2010	Bostons Angel	Robbie Power	Jessica Harrington
2011	Last Instalment	Brian O'Connell	Philip Fenton
2012	Back in Focus	Ruby Walsh	Willie Mullins
2013	Carlingford Lough	Tony McCoy	John Kiely
2014	Don Poli	Bryan Cooper	Willie Mullins
2015	No More Heroes	Bryan Cooper	Gordon Elliott
2016	Our Duke	Robbie Power	Jessica Harrington
2017	Shattered Love	Mark Walsh	Gordon Elliott
2018	Delta Work	Davy Russell	Gordon Elliott
2019	Battleoverdoyen	Davy Russell	Gordon Elliott
2020	Monkfish	Paul Townend	Willie Mullins
2021	Fury Road	Jack Kennedy	Gordon Elliott
2022	Gaillard Du Mesnil	Paul Townend	Willie Mullins
2023	Grangeclare West	Paul Townend	Willie Mullins
2024	Croke Park	Sam Ewing	Gordon Elliott

== See also ==
- Horse racing in Ireland
- List of Irish National Hunt races
