= Davy Condon =

- Davy Condon at the winner's presentation after his victory in the 2009 WBX Fighting Fifth Hurdle atop Go Native.

Personal information
- Born: County Waterford, Ireland
- Occupation: Jockey

Horse racing career
- Sport: Horse racing

Significant horses
- Go Native, Pandorama, Hollo Ladies, Noble Alan, Monet's Garden, Emma Jane, Sunshine Guest, Jumbajukiba, Ebaziyan, Homer Wells, Holy Orders, Definite Best
- Updated on 24 January 2010

Davy Condon (born ~1984/1985) is an Irish National Hunt racing jockey in Great Britain and Ireland. Condon’s father, Michael Condon, was an amateur jockey. His father rode for Jimmy Murphy and Charles Byrnes, but a fall that left him in a coma cut his career short with just one win to his credit. His nephew Richard is also a jockey and had a winner at the Cheltenham festival in 2021 on Heaven Help Us. His grandfather, Gerry Townend, was also a notable amateur jockey. Condon retired in 2015 after a spinal injury.

== Career ==
After graduating from the pony racing circuit, Condon was discovered by horse trainer Willie Mullins. At the age of 16, Condon made his first appearance as a jockey at Tipperary on 25 May 2001. That August, Condon got his first victory, winning atop Slaney Boy in a handicap race at Tramore. Just one day later, Condon found himself in the winner’s circle once again at Tramore, winning another handicap race with Knockatotaun. The next month, Condon was part of a winning double at Gowran Park. Later in the season, Condon won again, this time while riding Flying Boat to a win at Cork. The win at Cork gave Condon five in his inaugural campaign. In 2002, Condon won a total of 27 races. He finished second to Tadhg O'Shea in the race for the Champion Apprentice title, winning four less races, but taking 161 less rides than O'Shea during the season.

In 2003, Condon won 22 flat races, many of those coming while riding Holy Orders. He also won on Definite Best in the Irish Cambridgeshire at Curragh. Condon followed 2003 with similar success in 2004, winning a total of 21 flat races. Like the previous season, much of his success in 2004 was atop Holy Orders. However, after riding Holy Orders to a fourth-place finish at Musselburgh late in the year, Condon began to look at the prospects of switching to National Hunt racing. His first season on the National Hunt circuit was unsuccessful, as he won just nine races.

It was not until the 2006/07 racing season that Condon began to make an impact in National Hunt racing. Under the tutelage of Willie Mullins, Condon made his presence known by accumulating 26 victories. Condon rode Homer Wells to significant wins in the Thyestes Chase at Gowran Park and the Bobbyjo Chase at Fairyhouse. However, perhaps Condon’s most notable win in the 2006/07 season came when he rode Ebaziyan, a 40-1 underdog, to a win in the Supreme Novices' Hurdle. Condon matched his 2006/07 success with 26 more wins in 2007/08, capped with a win in the Pat Taaffe Handicap Chase at the Punchestown Festival atop Emma Jane.

In 2008, Condon became the stable jockey for Nicky Richards. During the season, he went on to win 24 races, including wins in the Peterborough Chase on Monet's Garden and the Scottish Champion Hurdle on Noble Alan. In 2009, Condon decided to leave Richards in favor of returning to Ireland, teaming up with Noel Meade. He has since taken over for the suspended Paul Carberry and found great success in the process, winning a total of five Grade 1 races, including the Drinmore Novice Chase and Knight Frank Novice Chase with Pandorama, the Future Champions Novice Hurdle on Hollo Ladies, and the Fighting Fifth Hurdle and Christmas Hurdle on Go Native. He retired in 2015 after falling in the Grand National.

== Major wins ==
(Republic of Ireland) Ireland

- Ryanair Gold Cup - (1) Realt Mor (2013)
- Fort Leney Novice Chase – (1) Pandorama (2009)
- Future Champions Novice Hurdle – (1) Hollo Ladies (2009)
- Drinmore Novice Chase – (1) Pandorama (2009)

(United Kingdom) Great Britain

- Supreme Novices' Hurdle – (1) Ebaziyan (2007)
- Fighting Fifth Hurdle – (1) Go Native (2009)
- Christmas Hurdle – (1) Go Native (2009)
