= Go Native =

Irish-bred Thoroughbred racehorse

- Go Native after winning the 2009 Fighting Fifth Hurdle
- Sire: Double Eclipse
- Grandsire: Pitcairn
- Dam: Native Idea
- Damsire: Be My Native
- Sex: Gelding
- Foaled: 2003
- Country: Ireland
- Colour: Brown
- Breeder: PJ Murphy
- Owner: Docado Syndicate
- Trainer: Noel Meade
- Record: 8-4-0
- Earnings: £310,254

Major wins
- Supreme Novices' Hurdle (2009) Fighting Fifth Hurdle (2009) Christmas Hurdle (2009)
- Last updated on 21 March 2010

Go Native (foaled in 2003 in Ireland, died 23 November 2012) was an Irish Thoroughbred racehorse, born to sire Double Eclipse and dam Native Idea. He was owned by Docado Syndicate, trained by Noel Meade, and his primary jockey has been Paul Carberry. He was purchased by the Docado Syndicate for £25,000 from horse dealer Martin Cullinane. As of March 21, 2009, Go Native’s career record stands at 8 wins, 4 places and 0 shows, with 3 of his wins coming in Grade 1 Hurdle races. He has amassed £310,254 in lifetime earnings.

== Early Racing Career ==
Go Native started racing as a four-year-old in June 2007. He won his first race, the Masterchefs Hospitality (Pro/Am), in April 2008 at Punchestown Racecourse near Naas, County Kildare, in Ireland. He beat a field of 25 horses to earn his first victory. His first notable win came in March 2009 at Cheltenham Racecourse, located on the outskirts of Cheltenham, Gloucestershire, England. There, Go Native bested a field of 20 horses to win the Supreme Novices' Hurdle, a Grade 1 National Hunt race.

== Pursuit of 2009/10 Triple Crown of Hurdling ==
Ridden by jockey Davy Condon, Go Native, a 25-1 longshot, went on to win the 2009 Fighting Fifth Hurdle at Newcastle Racecourse in Newcastle, England, defeating Sublimity by 2.5 lengths. He followed up his win at Newcastle by winning the Christmas Hurdle at Kempton Park Racecourse in Surrey, England, where he beat a strong finishing Starluck by a short head, keeping him in the running to become the first horse to win the £1m Triple Crown of Hurdling bonus offered by WBX. With Paul Carberry at the helm after serving his suspension, Go Native entered the Champion Hurdle as a 4-1 favorite. However, he failed to jump the second hurdle cleanly and was unable to recover, finishing the race in 10th place. Noel Meade, speaking of Go Native after the race, was quoted as saying: He just dived at the second and that was the end of his race, so he must have hurt himself in some way. If he's OK we'll look at Punchestown.

== Death ==
Go Native died 23 November 2012 after suffering a leg injury during training.
