= Commanche Court =

Irish-bred Thoroughbred racehorse

- Sire: Commanche Run (FR)
- Dam: Sorceress
- Damsire: Fabulous Dancer
- Sex: Gelding
- Foaled: 1993
- Country: Ireland
- Colour: Chestnut
- Breeder: Cambremont Ltd Partnership
- Owner: Dermot Desmond
- Trainer: N Clement; Ted Walsh
- Record: 56: 12-6-9
- Earnings: £445,519

Major wins
- Triumph Hurdle (1997); Irish Grand National (2000); Punchestown Gold Cup (2000); Lismullen Hurdle (1998); Christmas Hurdle (1998); Spring Juvenile Hurdle (1997)
- Last updated on 1 July 2009

Commanche Court (14 April 1993 – 26 May 2009) was an Irish Thoroughbred racehorse owned by financier Dermot Desmond and trained in Ireland by Ted Walsh. The son of Commanche Run gave his trainer his one and only Cheltenham Festival winner when landing the 1997 Triumph Hurdle under Norman Williamson.

In 2000 he gave Ted Walsh and his son Ruby Walsh a first Irish Grand National victory when beating Foxchapel King by ten lengths. He was second to Best Mate in the 2002 Cheltenham Gold Cup. In 2005 he was retired to the paddocks to join Grand National winner Papillon, but continued to be ridden out by anybody who came to visit him at the Walsh family's County Kildare home. Among his regular riders was 11-year-old Aubrey, whose father owns a share in fellow Cheltenham Festival winner Cousin Vinny.

The 16-year-old remained sound and "a picture of health", much to the delight of Walsh, who called him "the kindest, gentlest little horse" he had ever had the pleasure of meeting.

On 26 May 2009 he was put down after suffering a colic attack.
