= Drinmore Novice Chase =

Steeplechase horse race in Ireland

- Class: Grade 1
- Location: Fairyhouse; County Meath, Ireland
- Race type: Chase
- Sponsor: Bar One Racing
- Website: Fairyhouse

Race information
- Distance: 2m 4f (4,023 metres)
- Surface: Turf
- Track: Right-handed
- Qualification: Four-years-old and up
- Weight: 11 st 2 lb (4yo); 11 st 10 lb (5yo+); Allowances; 7 lb for fillies and mares
- Purse: €70,000 (2020); 1st: €41,300

Drinmore Novice Chase
2025
Romeo Coolio	Gold Dancer	Captain Cody

Previous years
2024
Croke Park	Heart Wood	Firefox
2023
I Am Maximus	Found A Fifty	Letsbeclearaboutit
2022
Mighty Potter	Gaillard Du Mesnil	Banbridge
2021
Beacon Edge	Gabynako	Fury Road

2020-2011
2020
Envoi Allen	Assemble	Home By The Lee
2019
Fakir D'Oudairies	Ronald Pump	Burrows Saint
2018
Delta Work	Le Richebourg	Jetz
2017
Death Duty	Rathvinden	Snow Falcon
2016
Coney Island	Anibale Fly	Alpha Des Obeaux
2015
No More Heroes	Monksland	Free Expression
2014
Valseur Lido	Apache Stronghold	Real Steel
2013
Don Cossack	Carlingford Lough	Road To Riches
2012
Arvika Ligeonniere	Dedigout	Texas Jack
2011
Bog Warrior	Shinrock Paddy	Rivage D'Or

2010-2001
2010
Jessies Dream	Realt Dubh	Head of the Posse
2009
Pandorama	Alpha Ridge	Jered
2008
Trafford Lad	Forpadydeplasterer	Rare Bob
2007
Sky's The Limit	Be My Leader	Line Ball
2006
Cailin Alainn	Schindlers Hunt	Gazza's Girl
2005
Kill Devil Hill	Father Matt	Mansony
2004
Watson Lake	Forget The Past	Mutineer
2003
Nil Desperandum	Catalpa Cargo	BallyAmber
2002
Le Coudray	Barrow Drive	Fiery Ring
2001
Harbour Pilot	Risk Accessor	Macs Gildoran

2000-1994
2000
Sackville	Arctic Copper	Well Ridden
1999
Alexander Banquet	Sallie's Girl	Feathered Leader
1998
Promalee	Foxchapel King	Inis Cara
1997
Private Peace	Guest Performance	Gentle Buck
1996
Dorans Pride	See More Business	Executive Options
1995
Johnny Setaside	Minella Lad	Duddon Sands
1994
Sound Man	Coq Hardi Affair	Winter Belle

The Drinmore Novice Chase is a Grade 1 National Hunt chase in Ireland which is open to horses aged four years or older. It is run at Fairyhouse over a distance of about 2 miles and 4 furlongs (4,023 metres), and during its running there are sixteen fences to be jumped. The race is for novice chasers, and it is scheduled to take place each year in late November or early December.

The event was first run in its present form in 1994, when it replaced a previous version called the Drinmore Chase. Since then it has held Grade 1 status, and it is now usually staged on the same afternoon as two other top-grade races – the Royal Bond Novice Hurdle and the Hatton's Grace Hurdle.

== Records ==
Leading jockey since 1994 (4 wins):

- Davy Russell – Cailin Alainn (2006), Don Cossack (2013), Death Duty (2017), Delta Work (2018)

Leading trainer since 1994 (9 wins):

- Gordon Elliott – Jessies Dream (2010), Don Cossack (2013), No More Heroes (2015), Death Duty (2017), Delta Work (2018), Envoi Allen (2020), Mighty Potter (2022), Croke Park (2024), Romeo Coolio (2025)

== Winners since 1994 ==
Year	Winner	Age	Jockey	Trainer
1994	Sound Man	6	Charlie Swan	Edward O'Grady
1995	Johnny Setaside	6	Paul Carberry	Noel Meade
1996	Dorans Pride	7	Richard Dunwoody	Michael Hourigan
1997	Private Peace	7	Charlie Swan	Aidan O'Brien
1998	Promalee	6	Ruby Walsh	Frances Crowley
1999	Alexander Banquet	6	Barry Geraghty	Willie Mullins
2000	Sackville	7	David Casey	Frances Crowley
2001	Harbour Pilot	6	Paul Carberry	Noel Meade
2002	Le Coudray	8	Barry Geraghty	Christy Roche
2003	Nil Desperandum	6	Ruby Walsh	Frances Crowley
2004	Watson Lake	6	Paul Carberry	Noel Meade
2005	Kill Devil Hill	5	John Cullen	Paul Nolan
2006	Cailin Alainn	7	Davy Russell	Charles Byrnes
2007	Sky's the Limit	6	Andrew McNamara	Edward O'Grady
2008	Trafford Lad	6	Tom Doyle	Dusty Sheehy
2009	Pandorama	6	Davy Condon	Noel Meade
2010	Jessies Dream	7	Timmy Murphy	Gordon Elliott
2011	Bog Warrior	7	Ruby Walsh	Tony Martin
2012	Arvika Ligeonniere	7	Ruby Walsh	Willie Mullins
2013	Don Cossack	6	Davy Russell	Gordon Elliott
2014	Valseur Lido	5	Bryan Cooper	Willie Mullins
2015	No More Heroes	6	Bryan Cooper	Gordon Elliott
2016	Coney Island	5	Mark Walsh	Edward Harty
2017	Death Duty	6	Davy Russell	Gordon Elliott
2018	Delta Work	5	Davy Russell	Gordon Elliott
2019	Fakir D'oudairies	4	Mark Walsh	Joseph O'Brien
2020	Envoi Allen	6	Jack Kennedy	Gordon Elliott
2021	Beacon Edge	7	Denis O'Regan	Noel Meade
2022	Mighty Potter	5	Jack Kennedy	Gordon Elliott
2023	I Am Maximus	7	Jody McGarvey	Willie Mullins
2024	Croke Park	6	Sam Ewing	Gordon Elliott
2025	Romeo Coolio	6	Jack Kennedy	Gordon Elliott

== See also ==
- Horse racing in Ireland
- List of Irish National Hunt races
