= Mouse Morris =

Irish racehorse trainer and jockey

The Honourable Michael Morris
Personal information
- Full name: Michael Francis Leo Morris
- Born: 4 April 1951 (age 75) Spiddal, Co Galway, Ireland
- Occupation: Trainer

Horse racing career
- Sport: Horse racing

Major racing wins
- Supreme Novices' Hurdle (1983); Queen Mother Champion Chase (1986); Christie's Foxhunter Chase (1986); Stayers' Hurdle (1990); Grand Annual Chase (2005); Cheltenham Gold Cup (2006); Neptune Novices' Hurdle (2011); Irish Grand National (2008, 2016); The Grand National (2016)

Significant horses
- Buck House, Trapper John, Cahervillahow, War Of Attrition, First Lieutenant, Rule The World

Michael Francis Leo Morris, informally known as "Mouse" Morris (born 4 April 1951), is an Irish racehorse trainer and former amateur and professional jockey. As a trainer, he has won the Grand National and the Cheltenham Gold Cup, and has won the Irish Grand National twice. In 2016, he won both the Grand National and Irish Grand National. He is formally known as the Honourable Michael Morris.

== Early life ==
Morris was born in Spiddal, County Galway, Ireland and is the second son of Michael Morris, 3rd Baron Killanin, who was president of the International Olympic Committee from 1972 to 1980 and Chairman of Galway Racecourse from 1970 to 1985. His mother, Sheila, was the daughter of Canon Douglas Dunlop, Rector of Oughterard and the granddaughter of Henry Dunlop who created the Lansdowne Road stadium in 1872. During World War II his mother was a cryptographer at Bletchley Park. According to Morris, "she was in Hut 6, but she wouldn't ever talk about it. Neither of them would talk about the war. She was bound by the Official Secrets Act, but whatever she did, she got an MBE for it."

Morris's twin brother John "Johnny" became a photographer and married Thelma Mansfield. Their elder brother, George Redmond "Red", followed in the footsteps of their father, Lord Killanin, by becoming a film producer. His credits include The Reader. They also have one sister, Deborah was married to the Theatre Director Bill Bryden.

At aged fifteen his formal education ended following his diagnosis with dyslexia. Morris then began working at racing stables. He earned the nickname "Mouse" when he was an amateur rider.

== Family ==
Morris was married to Susanna Felicity Clark. They had two sons, James "Jamie" born in 1983 and Christopher "Tiffer" born in 1985. Tiffer died in June 2015, aged 30, of carbon monoxide poisoning while travelling in Argentina.

== Jockey ==
Initially, Morris came to prominence as an amateur jockey. In 1974 he rode Mr Midland to victory at Cheltenham giving Edward O'Grady his first Festival winner. In 1975 he turned professional. He rode Skymas in his successive victories in 1976 and 1977 the Queen Mother Champion Chase at Cheltenham. He rode Billycan to victory in the 1977 Irish Grand National, a race he was subsequently to win twice as a trainer. His career as a rider ended after a fall in South Carolina's Colonial Cup.

== Trainer ==
Morris is based in Fethard Co Tipperary. In 1981, he took out a licence and began his National Hunt training career. Morris's first major breakthrough came when Buck House won the 1983 Supreme Novice Hurdle, giving him his first winner at Cheltenham.

The 1990s started brightly for the Mouse Morris yard when Trapper John ridden by jockey Charlie Swan won the Stayers' Hurdle at the 1990 Cheltenham Festival. The following year Cahervillahow was beaten by a short head in the Irish Grand National and merely three weeks later in the Whitbread Gold Cup he was controversially judged to have interfered with runner-up Docklands Express in the closing stages. As a result, Docklands Express was awarded the race. He finished second in the 1993 Grand National which was voided after a false start. Morris trained His Song who was one of the best novice hurdlers of the period. His Song finished second behind the J. P. McManus owned Istabraq in the 1998 AIG Irish Champion Hurdle on his fourth race outing before again finishing second in the Supreme Novice Hurdle at Leopardstown. One of Morris's most important wins as a trainer came in 2006 when he sent out the seven-year-old gelding War Of Attrition to win the 2006 Cheltenham Gold Cup, beating another Irish challenger Hedgehunter on Saint Patrick's Day. In 2008, he trained Hear The Echo to victory in the Irish Grand National. In 2011, he trained the winner of the Grade 1 Neptune Investment Management Novices' Hurdle at Cheltenham, First Lieutenant, ridden by Davy Russell. In 2016, he won the Irish Grand National again this time with Rogue Angel. Also in 2016, he won the Grand National for the first time with Rule The World.

== Major wins ==
(Republic of Ireland) Ireland

- Arkle Novice Chase -(2) Buck House (1985), His Song (1999)
- Christmas Hurdle -(1) What A Question (1996)
- Dr P. J. Moriarty Novice Chase -(1) Cahervillahow (1990)
- Fort Leney Novice Chase -(1) Boss Doyle (1997)
- Golden Cygnet Novice Hurdle -(1) Monifeth Man (2000)
- Greenmount Park Novice Chase -(1) Baily Breeze (2005)
- Herald Champion Novice Hurdle -(1) His Song (1998)
- John Durkan Memorial Punchestown Chase -(1) Cahervillahow (1993)
- Ladbrokes Champion Chase -(1) Foxchapel King (2001)
- Paddy Power Future Champions Novice Hurdle -(2) His Song (1997), First Lieutenant (2010)
- Punchestown Champion Chase -(1) Buck House (1985)
- Punchestown Gold Cup -(1) War Of Attrition (2006)
- Racing Post Novice Chase -(1) His Song (1998)
- Ryanair Novice Chase -(1) Alcapone (2001)
- Savills Chase -(2) Cahervillahow (1990), Foxchapel King (2001)
- Slaney Novice Hurdle -(2) Venalmar (2008), Rule The World (2013)
- Irish Grand National -(2) Hear The Echo (2008), Rogue Angel (2016)

(United Kingdom) Great Britain

- Betway Bowl -(1) First Lieutenant (2013)
- Cheltenham Gold Cup -(1) War of Attrition (2006)
- Mildmay Novices' Chase -(1) Boss Doyle (1998)
- Stayers' Hurdle -(1) Trapper John (1990)
- Supreme Novices' Hurdle -(1) Buck House (1983)
- Grand National -(1) Rule the World (2016)
