= Paul Carberry =

Irish jockey

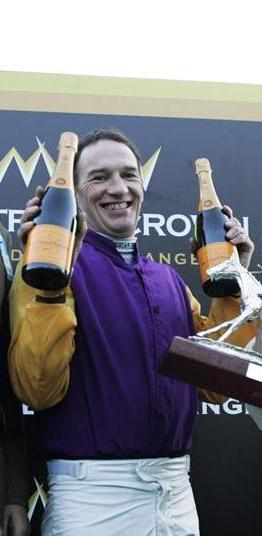
- Paul Carberry after winning the 2007 Fighting Fifth Hurdle

Personal information
- Born: 9 February 1974 (age 52) Ashbourne, County Meath, Ireland
- Occupation: Jockey

Horse racing career
- Sport: Horse racing

Significant horses
- Harchibald, Sausilito Bay, Nicanor, Florida Pearl, Beef Or Salmon, Solerina, Harbour Pilot, Hairy Molly, Bobbyjo

Paul Carberry is a retired Irish National Hunt jockey.

== Background ==
He was born on 9 February 1974. He hails from a racing family. He is the son of jockey Tommy Carberry, who was a famous National Hunt jockey in the 1960s and 1970s. His uncle is Arthur Moore, one of Ireland's leading National Hunt trainers. His younger siblings, Philip and Nina, were also successful Irish riders.

== Riding career ==
Apprenticing for Jim Bolger, Carberry earned his first win in August 1990 on Petronelli. He was also the jockey for racehorse owner Robert Ogden. Carberry learned his trade through hunting, show-jumping and point-to-pointing in Ireland and many view him as one of Ireland's leading jump jockeys along with Ruby Walsh, Barry Geraghty, Davy Russell and Andrew McNamara. In 1993, atop Rhythm Section, Carberry won the Champion Bumper – his first win at the Cheltenham Festival. In 1998, aboard Bobbyjo who was trained by his father, he won the Irish Grand National on his local racecourse, Fairyhouse. Arguably the biggest win of his career was when he followed in his father's footsteps and won the Grand National at Aintree Racecourse aboard Bobbyjo in 1999.

Of all the horses Carberry has been paired with, perhaps the most successful partnership has been with Harchibald. The two went on to win five Grade 1 races, with wins in the Fighting Fifth Hurdle (2004, 2007), Christmas Hurdle (2004, 2008) and the John James McManus Memorial Hurdle (2005). However, the pairing is most known for their battle with Hardy Eustace at the 2005 Champion Hurdle. In the race, Harchibald looked certain to win, only to be beat by Hardy Eustace at the finish line.

Carberry has been associated with many great horses throughout his career, including Sausilito Bay, Nicanor, Florida Pearl, Beef Or Salmon, Solerina, Harbour Pilot, Harchibald, Hairy Molly, Go Native and Bobbyjo. He has won 39 Grade 1 races in his career. In January 2013 Paul returned to the big-race winners enclosure in Britain when winning the Welsh National at Chepstow on Monbeg Dude, beating Tony McCoy close to the line after a classic Carberry hold-up-and-creep ride.

Carberry was stable jockey to Noel Meade for many years up to his retirement. He has a brand of racewear selling a variety of racing equipment named after him.

On 9 August 2016, Carberry announced his retirement from the saddle after failing to recover from a long-standing leg injury sustained in a fall at Listowel in September 2015.

== Controversies ==
Despite all of his success in National Hunt racing, Carberry has faced problems off the racecourse. In October 2005, he was arrested and charged over an incident which took place on board an Aer Lingus flight from Málaga to Dublin when he set fire to a newspaper. In May 2006 he was sentenced to two months in jail over the incident but granted bail pending an appeal. The sentence was quashed in October 2006 with Carberry agreeing to do voluntary work. In 2009, Carberry was suspended for 30 days by the Referrals Committee of the Turf Club after he failed an alcohol breath test at Naas on 31 October 2009. The suspension caused Carberry to miss the 2009 Fighting Fifth Hurdle and Christmas Hurdle. His replacement, Davy Condon, rode Go Native to wins in both races.

After serving his suspension, Carberry and Go Native were paired together for the 2010 Champion Hurdle. A win in the race would have landed Go Native the Triple Crown of Hurdling and Carberry would have secured £150,000 as his share of the £1m bonus offered by WBX. However, Go Native was unable to capture the win, instead finishing in 10th place after being eased when beaten on the run from the final hurdle. Afterwards, Carberry said that Go Native dived after the second hurdle and was never the same moving forward.

Following his suspension, Carberry vowed not to drink again until his career as a National Hunt jockey was complete.

== Cheltenham Festival winners (14) ==
- Stayers' Hurdle – (1) Solwhit (2013)
- RSA Insurance Novices' Chase – (1) Looks Like Trouble (1999)
- Baring Bingham Novices' Hurdle – (1) Nicanor (2006)
- Spa Novices' Hurdle – (1) Very Wood (2014)
- Supreme Novices' Hurdle (2) Sausilito Bay (2000), Go Native (2009)
- Champion Bumper – (2) – Rhythm Section (1993), Hairy Molly (2006)
- Pertemps Final – (1) Oulart (2005)
- Festival Trophy Handicap Chase (2) Unguided Missile (1998), Frenchmans Creek (2002)
- Grand Annual Handicap Chase – (2) Fota Island (2005), Bellvano (2012)
- Fred Winter Juvenile Novices' Handicap Hurdle – Crack Away Jack (2008)

== Major wins ==
(Republic of Ireland) Ireland

- Irish Grand National – Bobbyjo (1998)
- Irish Gold Cup – (2) Florida Pearl (2000), Beef Or Salmon (2006)
- Punchestown Gold Cup – (1) Don Cossack (2015)
- Punchestown Champion Chase – (1) Strong Run (2002)
- Champion Stayers Hurdle – (1) Limestone Lad (2002)
- Herald Champion Novice Hurdle – (2) Scottish Memories (2002), Wild Passion (2005)
- Ryanair Novice Chase – (1) Direct Route (1998)
- Chanelle Pharma Novice Hurdle – (6) Bolino Star (1996), Native Estates (1998), Solerina (2003), Mr Nosie (2006), Aran Concerto (2007), Pandorama (2009)
- Ryanair Gold Cup – (4) Thari (2003), Conna Castle (2008), Aran Concerto (2009), Realt Dubh (2011)
- Alanna Homes Champion Novice Hurdle – (1) Asian Maze (2005)
- Ladbrokes Champion Chase – (2) Florida Pearl (1999), Road to Riches (2014)
- Morgiana Hurdle – (6) Nomadic (1998), Limestone Lad (2001, 2002), Harchibald (2004), Iktitaf (2006), Jazz Messenger (2007)
- Royal Bond Novice Hurdle – (4) Gambolling Doc (1994), Wild Passion (2004), Iktitaf (2005), Muirhead (2007)
- Drinmore Novice Chase – (3) Johnny Setaside (1995), Harbour Pilot (2001), Watson Lake (2004)
- Hatton's Grace Hurdle – (2) Limestone Lad (2001), Aitmatov (2007)
- John Durkan Memorial Punchestown Chase – (1) Florida Pearl (2001)
- Racing Post Novice Chase – (2) Central House (2003), Realt Dubh (2010)
- Paddy's Reward Club Chase – (1) Central House (2004)
- Dr P. J. Moriarty Novice Chase – (2) Harbour Pilot (2002), Apache Stronghold (2015)
- Paddy Power Future Champions Novice Hurdle – (1) Mr Nosie (2005)
- Christmas Hurdle (Ireland) – (3) Limestone Lad (2002), Rosaker (2005), Monksland (2012)
- Savills Chase – (4) Dorans Pride (1998), Beef Or Salmon (2004, 2005), Pandorama (2010)
- Arkle Novice Chase – (2) Frozen Groom (2000), Realt Dubh (2011)
- Fort Leney Novice Chase – (1) Casey Jones (2008)
- Slaney Novice Hurdle – (1) Monksland (2012)
- Golden Cygnet Novice Hurdle – (3) Pietro Vannucci (2002), Solerina (2003), Nicanor (2006)
- Spring Juvenile Hurdle – (2) Shirley's Delight (1994), Sungazer (2000)
- Mares Novice Hurdle Championship Final – (3) Bondi Storm (2001), Asian Maze (2005), Oscar Rebel (2008)
- Irish Daily Mirror Novice Hurdle – (1) Casey Jones (2007)
- Mares Champion Hurdle – (1) Mae's Choice (2012)

(United Kingdom) Great Britain

- Grand National -(1) Bobbyjo (1999)
- Fighting Fifth Hurdle – (2) Harchibald (2004, 2007)
- Sefton Novices' Hurdle – (1) Pleasure Shared (1996)
- Liverpool Hurdle – (1) Solwhit (2013)

France

- Prix Maurice Gillois – (1) Utopie Des Bordes (2012)
