= Ted Walsh =

Irish racehorse jockey and trainer (born 1950)

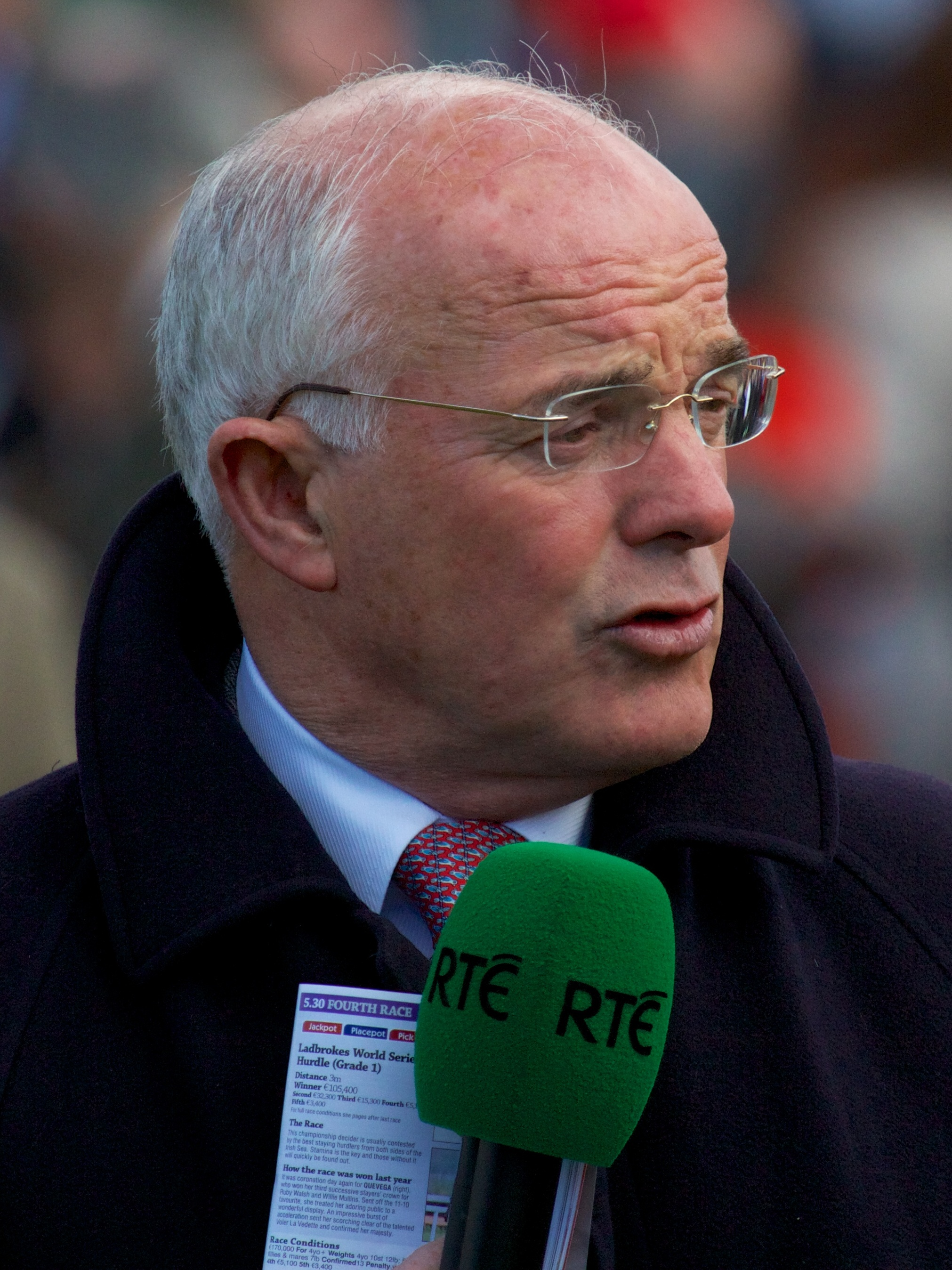
- Walsh in 2013

Personal information
- Born: 14 April 1950 (age 76) Fermoy, County Cork, Ireland
- Occupations: Jockey, Trainer

Horse racing career
- Sport: Horse racing

Ted Walsh (born 14 April 1950) is an Irish amateur jockey turned racehorse trainer who was born and raised in County Cork but based in Kill, County Kildare, Ireland. Ted is also father to amateur Irish National Hunt jockey, Katie Walsh and professional national hunt jockey Ruby Walsh. He retired from the broadcasting after 40 years working for RTÉ in 2023.

== Life and career ==
Walsh was born 14 April 1950 in Fermoy, Co Cork.

=== Jockey ===
During his time as a jockey, Walsh was the Irish champion amateur jump jockey eleven times. He won 4 Cheltenham Festival races. His first was in the 1974 Kim Muir on Castleruddery, and the last was in the 1986 Foxhunter Chase on Attitude adjuster. He also won the Queen Mother Champion Chase on Hilly Way in 1979. Another horse he had success on was Daring Run who won the 1981 and 1982 Aintree Hurdle.

=== Trainer ===
One of his more famous training achievements was training Papillon to win the 2000 English Grand National, and Commanche Court to win the Irish Grand National, both ridden by his son Ruby Walsh. The latter horse had won the Triumph Hurdle for him, and jockey Norman Williamson in 1997. That was Ted's first winner at the Cheltenham Festival as a trainer.

In the 2002 Cheltenham Gold Cup Commanche Court, ridden by Ruby, also finished second behind Best Mate. Walsh also trained Rince Ri who won two Ericsson chases as well as a Pillar Chase (he came second in another) and a Power Gold Cup. Ted trained Jack High to finish second behind Numbersixvalverde (ridden by Ruby) in the 2005 Irish Grand National. However, he gained compensation when Jack High won the Betfred Gold Cup (formerly the Whitbread) at Sandown later that year. In the 2012 English Grand National he trained third placed Seabass which was ridden by his daughter Katie Walsh.

=== Media ===
Ted has been a regular pundit on RTÉ Racing which covers some of important and popular race meetings on RTE television since the 1980s. This includes the Dublin Racing Festival in Leopardstown in February. The Irish Grand National festival in Fairyhouse at Easter. Punchestown National Hunt Festival in late April. Various flat Racing classics such as The Irish Derby in the Curragh at the end of June. The Galway summer festival and flat Racing festival in September. And the Christmas Racing festival from Leopardstown. He retired from the broadcasting after 40 years working for RTÉ in 2023.

== Cheltenham Festival winners as jockey (4) ==
- Queen Mother Champion Chase - (1) Hilly Way (1979)
- Fulke Walwyn Kim Muir Challenge Cup - (2) Castleruddery (1974), Prolan (1976)
- St James's Place Foxhunter Chase - (1) Attitude Adjuster (1986)

== Cheltenham Festival winners as trainer (2) ==
- Triumph Hurdle - (1) Commanche Court (1997)
- Fulke Walwyn Kim Muir Challenge Cup - (1) Any Second Now (2019)

== Major wins as jockey ==
(Republic of Ireland) Ireland

- Irish Champion Hurdle - (2) Daring Run (1981,1982)

== Major wins as trainer ==
(Republic of Ireland) Ireland

- Punchestown Gold Cup - (1) Commanche Court (2000)
- Ryanair Gold Cup - (1) Rince Ri (1999)
- Savills Chase - (2) Rince Ri (1999, 2000)
- Fort Leney Novice Chase - (1) Southern Vic (2005)
- Paddy's Reward Club Chase - (1) Papillon (1998)
- Christmas Hurdle (Ireland) - (1) Commanche Court (1998)
