= Dorans Pride =

Irish racehorse

- Racing silks of Tom Doran
- Sire: Orchestra
- Dam: Marians Pride
- Damsire: Pry
- Sex: Gelding
- Foaled: 1989
- Country: Ireland
- Colour: Chestnut
- Breeder: Hugh Suffern Bloodstock Ltd
- Owner: Tom Doran
- Trainer: Michael Hourigan
- Record: 73: 30-14-10
- Earnings: £657,357

Major wins
- Stayers' Hurdle (1995); Drinmore Novice Chase (1996); Powers Gold Cup (1997); Hot Power Chase (1997); Hennessy Cognac Gold Cup (1998); Boyne Hurdle (1995); Scalp Novice Chase (1997); Kerry National (1997); Morris Oil Chase (1997, 1998, 1999, 2000); Ericsson Chase (1998); Lismullen Hurdle (1994, 1995); Christmas Hurdle (1994); Irish Field Novice Chase (1996); William Neville & Sons Novice Chase (1996); Proudstown Hurdle (2000)
- Last updated on July 1, 2009

Dorans Pride (27 May 1989 – 13 March 2003) was an Irish thoroughbred racehorse.

== Racing career ==
Dorans Pride joined Michael Hourigan's yard in 1992 and was sold by the trainer to Tom Doran in February 1993, who gave the then nicknamed Padjo, his racing name. That season Dorans Pride won his only start in a bumper at Ballinrobe.

Hurdling beckoned and Hourigan opted to start Padjo in a maiden hurdle at the Listowel Festival. He won it easily. During his next three starts he finished only second in average company but when stepped up to handicap level he claimed what later proved his greatest scalp so far, subsequent Cheltenham Gold Cup winner Imperial Call.

Not having contested any Graded race, Dorans Pride lined up for the 1994 Sun Alliance Novices' Hurdle as an unfancied 14-1 shot but was disputing second with the Nigel Twiston-Davies-trained Corrouge when falling at the final hurdle. He won the Stayers' Hurdle the following year.

Having resented his retirement, he returned as a 14-year-old to run in the Foxhunter Chase at the 2003 Cheltenham Festival but was killed when falling at the second fence.
