= Charlie Swan (horse trainer) =

National Hunt jockey in Ireland

Charlie Swan (born 20 January 1968) is a former top National Hunt jockey in Ireland in the 1990s. He is associated with the great Istabraq, on whom he won three Champion Hurdles. He was twice top jockey at the Cheltenham Festival and was champion National Hunt jockey in Ireland for nine consecutive years. After retiring as a jockey he spent several years a trainer, based in Modreeny near Cloughjordan, County Tipperary.

== Early life ==
First and only son to Donald Swan, a former British Army Captain, and his wife Teresa, Charlie was named after an ancestor who was the surgeon to the British King 'Bonnie Prince Charlie'. He rode his first winner as a fifteen-year-old, on his father’s Final Assault, in a two-year-old maiden at Naas in March 1983, and, after a successful spell as an apprentice, he later turned his attention to the National Hunt scene. He won his first Irish jockeys' championship in 1989/90 and retained the title up to and including the 1997/98 season. He was only deposed as champion Irish rider after deciding to concentrate on his training career. Swan holds the Irish records for the most winners in a season (147 in 1995/96) and the most in a calendar year.

Away from Cheltenham, he has ridden numerous big-race winners, including Ebony Jane in the Irish Grand National and Ushers Island and Life Of A Lord in the Whitbread Gold Cup.

== Cheltenham ==
Swan's first Cheltenham festival winner was Trapper John in the Stayers Hurdle in 1990. He was twice leading jockey at the Cheltenham Festival, 1993 and 1994. He will always be associated with Istabraq, who won at the festival four years in a row, but other memorable wins were Danoli's Royal & Sun Alliance Hurdle and Viking Flagship's Queen Mother Champion Chase.

== Istabraq ==
He is usually associated with the gelding Istabraq on which he rode to victory 23 times over hurdles including three consecutive renewals of the Champion Hurdle (1998 to 2000), four Irish Champion Hurdles (1998–2001) and race wins at Aintree, Leopardstown and Punchestown. He won the 1997 Royal and Sun Alliance Hurdle when sent off a 6/5 fav. Istabraq sweated up badly before the race and Charlie rode a masterful race, getting him settled at the very back of a large field, then resisting the urge to make up ground going uphill before battling to victory by a length. In 1998 it was more straightforward as Istabraq won the Champion Hurdle going right away up the hill to win by 12 lengths. He confirmed his superiority by winning again in 1999 and 2000. He was the ante post favourite for the 2001 Champion Hurdle, but the Foot and Mouth outbreak caused the 2001 festival to be abandoned. Despite just one unconvincing run and plenty of rumours about Istabraq's fitness before Cheltenham, there was still a late flood of money for the great horse in 2002. But Istabraq was never right and Charlie had to pull him up in front of the stands. Nevertheless, both horse and rider were given a tremendous ovation by the crowd.

== Trainer ==
Based in Cloughjordan, Charlie Swan took out a trainer's licence in 1998, taking over from his father, Donald Swan. He operated as both jockey and trainer for a few years until having his final ride on Aintree Grand National Day in April 2003.

Major successes as a trainer included This Is Serious (2001 Thyestes Chase at Gowran Park and 2002 Eider Chase at Newcastle), Anxious Moment (2003 Craddockstown Novice Chase at Punchestown), Ground Ball (2005 Dan Moore Memorial Handicap Chase at Fairyhouse), What A Native (four straight victories in 2005/6 including the Grade 2 Porterstown Chase at Fairyhouse and the Pierse Leopardstown Chase). In 2007 One Cool Cookie won the Grade 1 Powers Gold Cup at Fairyhouse and Offshore Account won the Hanover Quay Champion Novice Chase at Punchestown. In 2015 Swan announced his retirement from training due to increased costs and a lack of quality horses. By the time of his retirement he had trained over 500 winners.

== Cheltenham Festival winners (17) ==
- Champion Hurdle – (3) Istabraq (1998, 1999, 2000)
- Queen Mother Champion Chase – (1) Viking Flagship (1995)
- Stayers' Hurdle – (2) Trapper John (1990), Shuil Ar Aghaidh (1993)
- Supreme Novices' Hurdle – (2) Montelado (1993), Like-A-Butterfly (2002)
- Baring Bingham Novices' Hurdle – (3) Danoli (1994), Urubande (1996), Istabraq (1997)
- Triumph Hurdle – (2) Shawiya (1993), Scolardy (2002)
- Champion Bumper – (2) Mucklemeg (1994), Joe Cullen (2000)
- Coral Cup – (1) Time for a Run (1994)
- Pertemps Final – (1) Fissure Seal (1993)

== Major wins ==
(Republic of Ireland) Ireland

- Irish Champion Hurdle – (6) Nordic Surprise (1991), Istabraq (1998, 1999, 2000, 2001), Like-A-Butterfly (2003)
- Punchestown Champion Chase – (1) Good for a Laugh (1991)
- Punchestown Champion Hurdle (2) Istabraq (1999), Grimes (2000)
- Champion Stayers Hurdle – (1) Bannow Bay (2001)
- Morgiana Hurdle – (3) Destriero (1992), Danoli (1994), Cockney Lad (1996)
- Royal Bond Novice Hurdle – (4) Thats My Man (1995), Istabraq (1996), Liss A Paoraigh (2000), Like-a-Butterfly (2001)
- Drinmore Novice Chase – (2) Sound Man (1994), Private Peace (1997)
- Hatton's Grace Hurdle – (3) Danoli (1994), Istabraq (1997, 1998)
- John Durkan Memorial Punchestown Chase – (1) Royal Mountbrowne (1996)
- Paddy Power Future Champions Novice Hurdle – (2) Istabraq (1996), Joe Mac (1998)
- Christmas Hurdle (Ireland) – (2) Bannow Bay (2000, 2001)
- Savills Chase – (1) Cahervillahow (1990)
- December Festival Hurdle – (6) Novello Allegro (1992), Theatreworld (1996), Istabraq (1997, 1998, 1999, 2001)
- Slaney Novice Hurdle – (2) Ventana Canyon (1995), Risk Accessor (2001)
- Golden Cygnet Novice Hurdle – (1) Annie Cares (1999)
- Arkle Novice Chase – (1) Private Peace (1998)
- Champion Four Year Old Hurdle – (3) Shawiya (1993), Glenstal Flagship (1994), Topacio (2000)
- Chanelle Pharma Novice Hurdle – (3) Danoli (1994), Istabraq (1997), Like-A-Butterfly (2002)
- Dr P. J. Moriarty Novice Chase – (2) Cahervillahow (1990), Mass Appeal (1992)
- Mares Novice Hurdle Championship Final – (1) Site-Leader (1999)
- Herald Champion Novice Hurdle – (3) Vestris Abu (1990), Hotel Minella (1995), Cardinal Hill (1999)
- Alanna Homes Champion Novice Hurdle – (1) Istabraq (1997)

(United Kingdom) Great Britain

- Aintree Hurdle – (4) Danoli (1994,1995), Urubande (1996), Istabraq (1999)
- Christmas Hurdle – (1) Intersky Falcon (2002)
- Sefton Novices' Hurdle – (1) Boreen Belle (1989)
- Mersey Novices' Hurdle – (2) Tervel (1995), Promalee (1998)
