= Davy Russell =

Irish National Hunt jockey

- Davy Russell after riding Solwhit in the 2009 WBX Fighting Fifth Hurdle

Personal information
- Born: 27 June 1979 (age 46) Youghal, County Cork, Ireland
- Occupation: Jockey

Horse racing career
- Sport: Horse racing

Honours
- Irish jump racing Champion Jockey (2011–12), (2012–13), (2017–2018)

Significant horses
- Weapon's Amnesty, War of Attrition, Solwhit, Forpadydeplasterer, Back In Front, Sir Des Champs, Lord Windermere, Tiger Roll.

David Niall Russell (born 27 June 1979) is an Irish retired National Hunt jockey. He was Irish jump racing Champion Jockey three times, and won the Grand National (twice), the Cheltenham Gold Cup and the Grand Steeple-Chase de Paris.

== Childhood and amateur career ==
Russell was born the second youngest of six children and raised on the farm of his parents Jerry and Phyllis Russell in Youghal, County Cork, Ireland. His father owned a few racehorses and the family walked puppies for the local hunt. As a child, Russell's passions were riding his pony, hurling, and helping his father with his horses.

Russell rode for four years as an amateur in point-to-points in Ireland, winning his first race in February 1999. During this period he also went hunting and worked in a fish factory.

== Professional career ==
In 2002 Russell moved to Yorkshire, England, to ride for the Irish trainer Ferdy Murphy at Middleham. Russell's first win as a professional jockey was on Inn Antique in a novice hurdle at Sedgefield, 12 November 2002. He gained many high-profile successes during his two seasons in England, winning the Peter Marsh Chase on Truckers Tavern in 2003 and also finishing second on the same horse in that year's Cheltenham Gold Cup. Other valuable wins on Murphy's horses came on Tribal Venture, Ballinclay King and Historg. His first win as a professional in Ireland came on Colonel Monroe on 29 December 2002.

After 14 months with Murphy, he returned to Ireland and spent a season with Edward O'Grady and then two years as a freelance jockey. He had his first Cheltenham Festival win in March 2006 on the Philip Rothwell trained Native Jack in the Cross Country Chase. Except for 2019, he then had at least one winner at the festival every year up to 2020, with his victories including the Gold Cup in 2014 on Lord Windermere, and a record three wins in the Coral Cup. In 2018, he won the leading jockey award at Cheltenham. Injury kept him having any rides at the festival in 2021.

In September 2007 he was invited to become Michael O'Leary's stable jockey at Gigginstown House Stud, a position he held until he was sacked after a win and over a cup of tea at Punchestown Racecourse on New Year's Eve 2013. He continued, however, to ride for Michael O'Leary on occasion.

Russell was champion Irish National Hunt jockey in 2011/12 and 2012/13, having been runner-up the five previous seasons. In August 2017 he rode Balko Des Flos to win the Galway Plate for the first time to add to his two Galway Hurdle wins of previous years.

An incident at Tramore Racecourse in August 2017 led to controversy when Russell was caught on camera aiming a blow at the head of his mount, Kings Dolly. Initially Russell was given a caution; this was later changed to a four-day suspension. At the hearing Russell argued that he had been trying to make the mare concentrate, and he criticised media coverage of the incident.

Russell was champion Irish National Hunt jockey for the third time in 2017/18. He won the 2018 Grand National at Aintree on 14 April on Michael O'Leary's Tiger Roll. At 38, Russell was the oldest jockey in the race, and, at 15.2 hands, Tiger Roll was the smallest horse. It was Russell’s 14th ride in the Grand National. In 2019 Russell and Tiger Roll again won the Grand National, with Russell becoming the first jockey since Brian Fletcher on Red Rum in 1974 to win back-to-back Grand Nationals on the same horse.

In May 2019 Russell had his first ride in the Grand Steeple-Chase de Paris, sometimes known as the French Gold Cup, and won on Carriacou, trained by Isabelle Pacault.

A fall in the Munster National at Limerick on 11 October 2020 left Russell with a serious vertebrae injury. He underwent surgery and needed to recuperate for months, announcing in February 2021 that he would not be fit to ride at the Cheltenham Festival in March.

Russell retired on 18 December 2022 after winning the Billy Harney Memorial Irish EBF Mares Novice Hurdle on Liberty Dance at Thurles Racecourse. On 11 January 2023 Russell announced he would come out of retirement to help Elliott and his owners after Jack Kennedy broke his leg. Four days later he rode his first winner since his return when Sa Fureur won a maiden hurdle at Punchestown.

After a disappointing Cheltenham Festival, a back injury sidelined Russell until the Grand National meeting at Aintree, where he rode two Grade 1 winners before being unseated at the first fence on Galvin in the Grand National. In his final race he came fifth on Pour Les Filles in the Champion Standard Open NH Flat Race on the same day.

== Retirement ==
Following his retirement from race riding, Russell continued to breed and trade young horses, as he had done for some years. In an interview with Racing Post he spoke of the need for jockeys to gain qualifications to use after retirement, and his own regret at not having gained an HGV licence.

== Personal life ==
Russell is married to Edelle O’Meara, a science and maths teacher and former Irish pole vault champion. The couple live in Youghal and have four children together. Russell also has a daughter from a previous relationship.

Together with trainer Jim Bolger, Russell organises an annual celebrity hurling match in aid of the Irish Cancer Society. By 2019 the match had raised a total of over €1 million for cancer research.

== TV ==
Russell featured in a TG4 documentary called Jump Boys. It followed the journeys of Ruby Walsh, Barry Geraghty and Russell over the course of the 2011/12 season. It aired on 28 November 2012. In 2013 he appeared in the documentary The Irish Road To Cheltenham, shown on RTÉ One television in Ireland.

Russell was one of the contestants in the seventh series of the Irish TV programme Dancing with the Stars, being eliminated in the semi-finals of the competition.

== Cheltenham Festival winners ==
Cheltenham Festival winners (22)
Year	Race	Mount
2006	Glenfarclas Cross Country Chase	Native Jack
2007	Festival Trophy Handicap Chase	Joes Edge
2008	Coral Cup	Naiad Du Missleot
2008	Grand Annual Chase	Tiger Cry
2009	Albert Bartlett Novices' Hurdle	Weapon's Amnesty
2010	RSA Insurance Novices' Chase	Weapons Amnesty
2011	Coral Cup	Carlito Brigante
2011	Neptune Investment Management Novices' Hurdle	First Lieutenant
2012	JLT Novices' Chase	Sir Des Champs
2013	RSA Insurance Novices' Chase	Lord Windermere
2014	Triumph Hurdle	Tiger Roll
2014	Cheltenham Gold Cup	Lord Windermere
2014	Grand Annual Chase	Savello
2015	Glenfarclas Cross Country Chase	Rivage D'Or
2015	Neptune Investment Management Novices' Hurdle	Windsor Park
2016	Coral Cup	Diamond King
2016	Pertemps Final	Mall Dini
2017	Pertemps Final	Presenting Percy
2018	RSA Insurance Novices' Chase	Presenting Percy
2018	Ryanair Chase	Balko Des Flos
2018	Pertemps Final	Delta Work
2018	Brown Advisory & Merriebelle Stable Plate	The Storyteller
2020	Ballymore Novices' Hurdle	Envoi Allen
2020	Marsh Novices' Chase	Samcro
2020	Johnny Henderson Grand Annual Chase	Chosen Mate

== Other major wins ==
(Republic of Ireland) Ireland

- Alanna Homes Champion Novice Hurdle - (2) - Dedigout (2012), Un Atout (2013)
- Arkle Novice Chase - (2) - Thyne Again (2008), Some Plan (2017)
- Champion Four Year Old Hurdle - (1) - Won in the Dark (2008)
- Champion Stayers Hurdle - (1) - Jetson (2014)
- Chanelle Pharma Novice Hurdle - (1) - Forpadydeplasterer (2008)
- Christmas Hurdle - (2) - Prince Of Scars (2015), Apple's Jade (2017)
- Dooley Insurance Group Champion Novice Chase - (5) - Quito De La Roque (2011), Sir Des Champs (2012), Zabana (2016), The Storyteller (2018), Delta Work (2019)
- Dr P. J. Moriarty Novice Chase - (3) - The Railway Man (2006), Last Instalment (2012), Mighty Potter (2023)
- Drinmore Novice Chase - (4) - Cailin Alainn (2006), Don Cossack (2013), Death Duty (2017), Delta Work (2018)
- Future Champions Novice Hurdle - (1) - First Lieutenant (2010)
- Hatton's Grace Hurdle - (1) - Oscar Dan Dan (2009)
- Irish Champion Hurdle - (1) - Solwhit (2010)
- Irish Gold Cup - (2) - Sir Des Champs (2013), Conflated (2022)
- Ladbrokes Champion Chase - (1) - Quito de la Roque (2011)
- Mares Champion Hurdle - (3) - Blazing Liss (2005), Oscar Rebel (2008), Shop Dj (2011)
- Mares Novice Hurdle Championship Final - (2) - For Bill (2010), Knockfierna (2011)
- Morgiana Hurdle - (2) - Solwhit (2009, 2010)
- Neville Hotels Novice Chase - (3) - Cailin Alainn (2006), Delta Work (2018), Battleoverdoyen (2019)
- Paddy Power Dial-A-Bet Chase - (1) - Mansony (2007)
- Punchestown Champion Chase - (1) - Mansony (2007)
- Punchestown Champion Hurdle - (2) - Solwhit (2009), Buveur d'Air (2019)
- Punchestown Gold Cup - (1) - Sir Des Champs (2013)
- Ryanair Hurdle - (2) - Solwhit (2009), Mick Jazz (2017)
- Savills Chase - (1) - Galvin (2021)
- Slaney Novice Hurdle - (2) - Rule The World (2013), Envoi Allen (2020)
- Spring Juvenile Hurdle - (2) - Pittoni (2010), Mega Fortune (2017)

(United Kingdom) Great Britain

- Grand National - (2) - Tiger Roll (2018, 2019)
- Aintree Hurdle - (1) - Solwhit (2009)
- Maghull Novices' Chase - (1) - Ornua (2019)
- Mildmay Novices' Chase - (2) - Quito De La Roque (2011), Gerri Colombe (2023)
- Mersey Novices' Hurdle - (2) - Three Stripe Life (2022), Irish Point (2023)

France

- Grand Steeple-Chase de Paris - (1) - Carriacou (2019)
