= Annie Power =

Irish-bred Thoroughbred racehorse

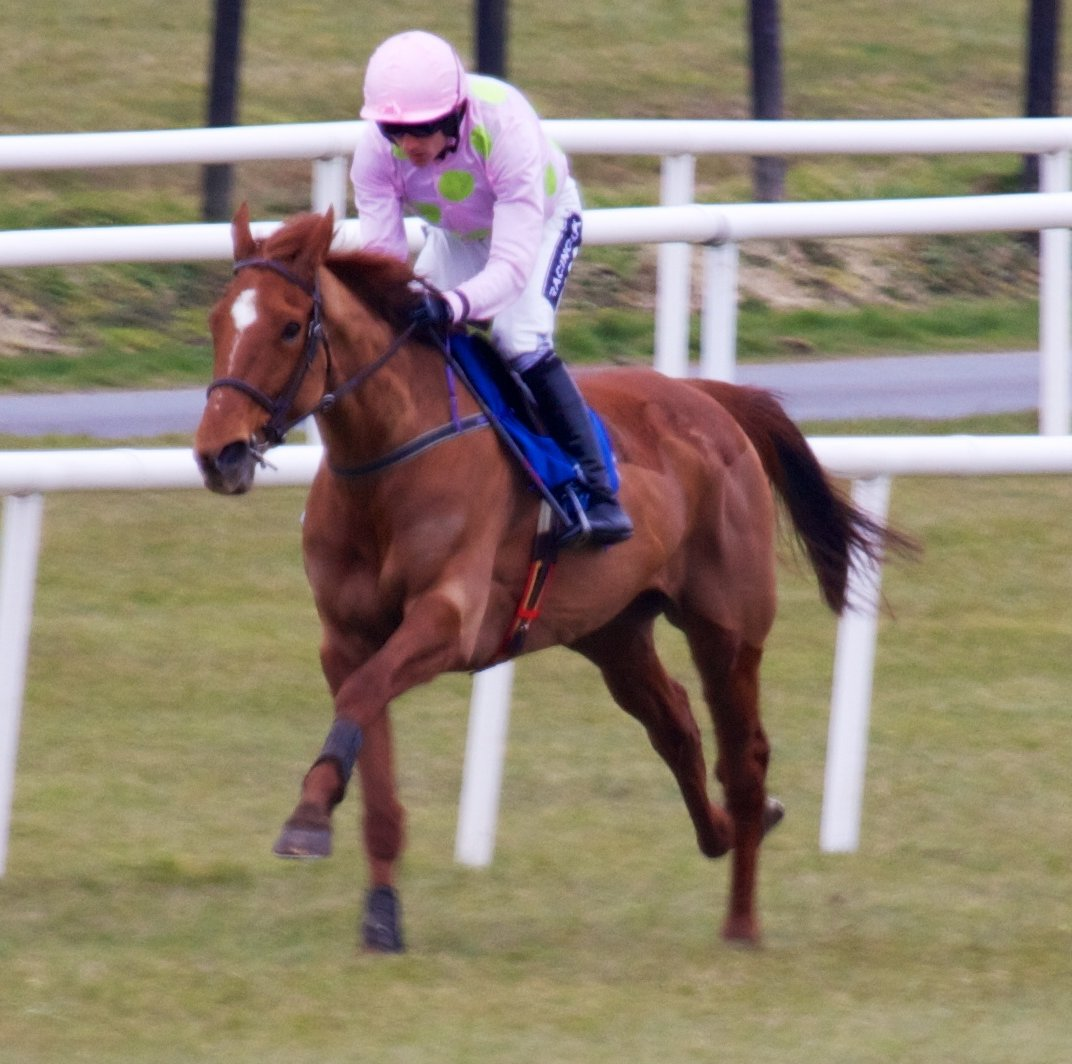
- Annie Power at Fairyhouse in March 2013.
- Sire: Shirocco
- Grandsire: Monsun
- Dam: Anno Luce
- Damsire: Old Vic
- Sex: Mare
- Foaled: 20 March 2008
- Country: Ireland
- Colour: Chestnut
- Breeder: Éamon Cleary
- Owner: Éamon Cleary; Susannah Ricci
- Trainer: Jim Bolger; Willie Mullins
- Record: 17:15-1-0
- Earnings: £715,232

Major wins
- Johnstown Novice Hurdle (2013); Mares Novice Hurdle Championship Final (2013); Ascot Hurdle (2013); Doncaster Mares' Hurdle (2014); Mares Champion Hurdle (2014, 2015); Champion Hurdle (2016); Aintree Hurdle (2016)

Annie Power (foaled 20 March 2008) is an Irish Thoroughbred racehorse. A National Hunt horse specialising in hurdle racing, she won fifteen of her seventeen races including the Johnstown Novice Hurdle, Irish Stallion Farms EBF Mares Novice Hurdle, Ascot Hurdle, Doncaster Mares' Hurdle and Mares Champion Hurdle. In 2016, she became the first mare for twenty two years to win the Champion Hurdle.

== Background ==
Annie Power is a chestnut mare with a narrow white blaze bred in Ireland by Eamon Cleary. She was sired by the German stallion Shirocco, whose wins included the Breeders' Cup Turf in 2005. As a breeding stallion he has sired the Goodwood Cup winner Brown Panther and several good National Hunt horses. Annie Power's dam Anno Luce was a high-class racemare, winning at Group Three level in Germany in 1996. The filly was sent into training with the leading Flat trainer Jim Bolger.

== Racing career ==
=== 2012/2013 National Hunt season ===
Annie Power began her racing career in National Hunt Flat races (also known as "bumpers") in the late summer of 2012. On 4 August at Galway Racecourse she was ridden by the amateur jockey Patrick Mullins and defeated nine opponents at odds of 9/10. Three weeks later at Wexford Racecourse she started 6/4 favourite for a mares' race and won by fifteen lengths from Ourbeautifuldream. Following this race the mare was sold to Rich and Susannah Ricci and moved to the stable of Willie Mullins (the father of Patrick) in County Carlow. On her first appearance for her new connections, Annie Power contested a bumper at Listowel Racecourse in which only one horse, a gelding named Vintage Supreme appeared to oppose her. The mare started at odds of 1/10 and led from the start before winning by sixty-one lengths.

In November, the mare was tested over hurdles for the first time in a race at Thurles Racecourse. Starting at odds of 1/2 in a field of eighteen mares, she took the lead three hurdles from the finish and won easily by thirteen lengths. Ruby Walsh took over the ride on Annie Power for her next race, when she was matched against more experienced opponents in the Kilsheelan Mares Hurdle at Clonmel Racecourse on 7 February. She was made the 1/3 favourite and led from the start, winning by six and a half lengths despite being eased down by Walsh in the closing stages. At Naas Racecourse later that month the mare was moved up in class for the Grade II paddypower.com Novice Hurdle and for the first time did not start favorite, being made second choice in the betting behind the A. P. McCoy-ridden gelding Defy Logic. Walsh settled the filly just behind the leader Defy Logic before overtaking the favorite approaching the last hurdle and drawing clear on the run-in to win by three and a quarter lengths. Annie Power bypassed the Cheltenham Festival, ending her season in the Grade I Irish Stallion Farms EBF Mares Novice Hurdle at Fairyhouse on 31 March for which she started 4/11 favourite ahead of her stable companion Glens Melody. She was restrained by Walsh in the early stages but took the lead approaching the turn into the straight and drew away to win very easily by twelve lengths from Glens Melody.

=== 2013/2014 National Hunt season ===
On her first appearance of the 2013/2014 season, Annie Power was sent to England for the Grade II Coral Hurdle at Ascot Racecourse on 23 November in which she was matched against the leading British hurdler Zarkandar. Annie Power and Zarkandar dominated the race over the last four hurdles, with the mare drawing away on the run-in to win by five lengths. Annie Power returned to England and met Zarkandar again in the Dornan Engineering Hurdle at Cheltenham Racecourse on 1 January 2014. In a race run in a strong wind and driving rain, the mare took the lead between the last two hurdles and won easily by eight lengths from the British gelding. Following the race, the Champion Hurdle and World Hurdle were mentioned as potential targets for the mare at the Cheltenham Festival. On 25 January Annie Power returned to competing against her own sex when she started 1/6 favourite for the OLBG.com Mares' Hurdle over two miles at Doncaster Racecourse. She led from the start and won easily by fifteen lengths from Doyly Carte. After the race, Walsh declined to name his preferred Festival target, but said of the winner, "She was very slick over her hurdles and she's just a very good mare. She's 10 from 10 and I'm glad to be riding her. Good horses aren't complicated, complicated ones don't tend to be good ones."

On 2 March, it was announced that Annie Power would contest the World Hurdle at Cheltenham, rather than taking on her stable companion Hurricane Fly in the Champion Hurdle. On 13 March, Annie Power started 11/8 favourite for the World Hurdle, ahead of Big Buck's, who was attempting to win the race for the fifth time. She was held up by Walsh before moving up to dispute the lead at the last. In the closing stages the race developed into a struggle between Annie Power and the six-year-old gelding More Of That, both of them unbeaten at the time, with the latter prevailing by one and a half lengths. After the mare's first defeat, Mullins admitted that she had been beaten by a better horse on the day but added that she was "probably a little keen to be a three-miler". On her final appearance of the season, Annie Power was brought back in distance and returned to single-sex competition for the Grade I Mares Champion Hurdle over two and a quarter miles at Punchestown. Starting the 1/6 favourite, she led throughout the race and drew clear in the closing stages to win by seven lengths from Jennies Jewel.

=== 2014/2015 National Hunt season ===
After a break of more than ten months, Annie Power returned for the OLBG Hurdle at the 2015 Cheltenham Festival on 10 March. The Mullins stable had already sent out three winners on the day and numerous combination bets depended on the mare's run. Starting the odds-on favourite she took the lead at the second last and looked likely to win easily before falling at the last hurdle in a race won by Glens Melody. British bookmakers Ladbrokes described it as "the £50 million fall" whilst for the punters perspective it was called "the most expensive fall in National Hunt history". On 2 May at Punchestown, Annie Power attempted to repeat her 2014 success in the Mares Champion Hurdle. Starting at odds of 2/9 against six opponents, she led from the start and drew clear over the last two hurdles to win by ten lengths from her five-year-old stablemate Anafilet.

=== 2015/2016 National Hunt season ===
Following another lengthy absence, Annie Power returned to the track in a minor event at Punchestown on 17 February 2016. She was made the 1/20 favourite against two opponents and led from the start to win by six and a half lengths from Legacy Gold. The mare had been originally entered in the World Hurdle and the OLBG Hurdle at the Cheltenham Festival but after the injury to her stablemates Faugheen and Arctic Fire she was redirected to contest the Champion Hurdle after her owners paid a supplementary entry fee of £20,000. On 11 March started the 5/2 favourite for the Champion Hurdle ahead of eleven opponents headed by The New One, Nichols Canyon, Identity Thief and My Tent or Yours. Ridden by Ruby Walsh, she took the lead from the start and was never headed. She drew away from the field approaching the second last and stayed on strongly on the run-in to win by four and a half lengths and a head from My Tent or Yours and Nichols Canyon with Walsh punching the air in celebration at the finish. She was the fourth mare to win the race after African Sister (1939), Dawn Run (1984) and Flakey Dove (1994).

=== 2016/2017 National Hunt season: retirement ===
Due to various setbacks in training, Annie Power did not race during the 2016/17 season and in May 2017 Mullins announced that she was in foal to Camelot and would not return to racing.

== Breeding record ==
Annie Power lost her Camelot foal and was subsequently sold to Coolmore Stud, where she produced her first foal, a colt sired by Galileo, in February 2019. Mystical Power won a bumper at Ballinrobe on his racecourse debut and went on to win the Grade 1 Top Novices' Hurdle at Aintree and the KPMG Champion Novice Hurdle at Punchestown in 2024. Another colt, also sired by Galileo, was foaled in February 2020, followed by a Camelot colt in 2021.

== Pedigree ==
Pedigree of Annie Power (IRE), chestnut mare, 2008
| Sire Shirocco (GER) 2001 | Monsun (GER); 1990 | Königsstuhl | Dschingis Khan |
| Sire Shirocco (GER) 2001 | Monsun (GER); 1990 | Königsstuhl | Koningskronung |
| Sire Shirocco (GER) 2001 | Monsun (GER); 1990 | Mosella | Surumu |
| Sire Shirocco (GER) 2001 | Monsun (GER); 1990 | Mosella | Monasia |
| Sire Shirocco (GER) 2001 | So Sedulous (USA); 1991 | The Minstrel | Northern Dancer |
| Sire Shirocco (GER) 2001 | So Sedulous (USA); 1991 | The Minstrel | Fleur |
| Sire Shirocco (GER) 2001 | So Sedulous (USA); 1991 | Sedulous | Tap On Wood |
| Sire Shirocco (GER) 2001 | So Sedulous (USA); 1991 | Sedulous | Pendulina |
| Dam Anno Luce (GB) 1993 | Old Vic (GB); 1986 | Sadler's Wells | Northern Dancer |
| Dam Anno Luce (GB) 1993 | Old Vic (GB); 1986 | Sadler's Wells | Fairy Bridge |
| Dam Anno Luce (GB) 1993 | Old Vic (GB); 1986 | Cockade | Derring-Do |
| Dam Anno Luce (GB) 1993 | Old Vic (GB); 1986 | Cockade | Camenae |
| Dam Anno Luce (GB) 1993 | Anna Paola (GER); 1978 | Prince Ippi | Imperial |
| Dam Anno Luce (GB) 1993 | Anna Paola (GER); 1978 | Prince Ippi | Prinzess Addi |
| Dam Anno Luce (GB) 1993 | Anna Paola (GER); 1978 | Antwerpen | Waldcanter |
| Dam Anno Luce (GB) 1993 | Anna Paola (GER); 1978 | Antwerpen | Adelsweihe (Family: 7-f) |

- Annie Power was inbred 4 x 4 to Northern Dancer, meaning that this stallion appears twice in the fourth generation of her pedigree.
