= Champagne Fever =

Irish-bred Thoroughbred racehorse

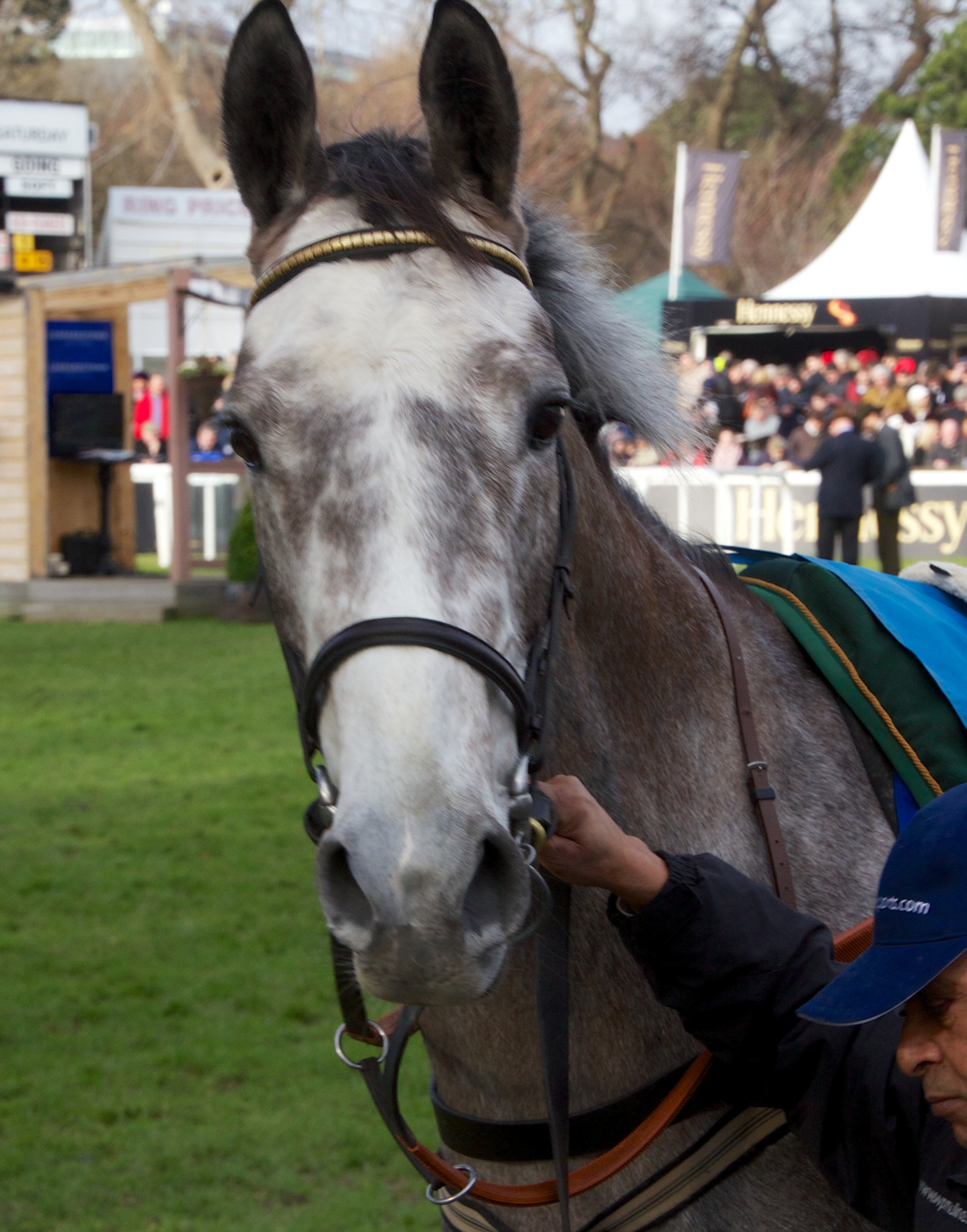
- Champagne Fever at Leopardstown in February 2013.
- Sire: Stowaway
- Grandsire: Slip Anchor
- Dam: Forever Bubbles
- Damsire: Roselier
- Foaled: 26 May 2007
- Country: Ireland
- Colour: Grey
- Breeder: John P. Cahill
- Owner: Susannah Ricci
- Trainer: Willie Mullins
- Record: 21:10-3-3
- Earnings: £345,955

Major wins
- Champion Bumper (2012); Champion INH Flat Race (2012); Deloitte Novice Hurdle (2013); Supreme Novices' Hurdle (2013); Clonmel Oil Chase (2014); Red Mills Chase (2015); John Meagher Memorial Chase (2016)

Champagne Fever (foaled 26 May 2007) is an Irish Thoroughbred racehorse who competes in National Hunt racing. He is noted for his front-running style and has won seven of his thirteen races. After beginning his racing career on the amateur point-to-point circuit he became the dominant National Hunt Flat performer in Britain and Ireland in 2012, winning the Champion Bumper and the Champion INH Flat Race. In the following season he was campaigned in novice hurdle races and won two more Grade I races, the Deloitte Novice Hurdle in Ireland and Supreme Novices' Hurdle in England. In his first season over steeplechase fences he won one minor race and finished second in the Arkle Challenge Trophy and in the following year he added win in the Clonmel Oil Chase and Red Mills Chase.

== Background ==
Champagne Fever is a grey gelding bred in Ireland by John P. Cahill and John Walsh. He was sired by Stowaway, who won the Gordon Stakes and the Great Voltigeur Stakes in 1997. Stowaway has made some impact as a National Hunt stallion, also siring Hidden Cyclone, winner of four Graded races in Ireland. Champagne Fever's dam Forever Bubbles was unraced.

As a three-year-old gelding, Champagne Fever was sent to the Tattersalls Ireland sale in June 2010 and was bought for €17,500 by Michael O'Mara. He was subsequently acquired by Rich and Sussanah Ricci and sent into training with Willie Mullins in County Carlow.

== Racing career ==
=== 2011/2012 National Hunt season: National Hunt Flat races ===
Before competing under National Hunt rules, Champagne Fever made an appearance on the amateur point-to-point circuit winning over three miles at the Quakerstown meeting on 24 April 2011. When the 2011/2012 National Hunt season began, Champagne Fever was campaigned in National Hunt Flat races, also known as "bumpers", starting at Leopardstown Racecourse on 26 December when he was ridden by his trainer's son Patrick Mullins and finished second to Thomas Edison. Mullins was again in the saddle when Champagne Fever reappeared in a bumper at Fairyhouse in January. He started the 1/4 favourite and led from the start to win "comfortably" by thirteen lengths.

On 14 March Champagne Fever started a 16/1 outsider for the Grade I Champion Bumper at the Cheltenham Festival. Mullins sent him into the lead after a furlong and held off several challengers to win by one and a quarter lengths from the favourite New Year's Eve. The New One and Jezki finished sixth and eighth respectively. After the race, Mullins said that "Champagne Fever has a huge cruising speed and that is where we went wrong with him first time out. Last time we made all and we decided to do the same today". In the following month, Champagne Fever started 11/4 favourite for the Grade I Champion INH Flat Race at the Punchestown Festival. As at Cheltenham, he led throughout the race, and after being challenged on the final turn, he drew away to win by seven and a half lengths from Melodic Rendezvous. Mullin described the winner as "a super horse. He just gallops all day, he obviously stays well, he jumps well so he's one we're really looking forward to. He has huge ability and I have considered going straight over fences with him. We could do what we did with Florida Pearl".

=== 2012/2013 National Hunt season: Novice hurdles ===
In the 2012/2013 National Hunt season Champagne Fever was campaigned in novice hurdle races. He made his debut over obstacles at Cork Racecourse on 18 November and led from the start to win easily by five lengths at odds of 1/8. The gelding was ridden by Ruby Walsh for the first time when he started 11/8 favourite for the Grade I Royal Bond Novice Hurdle at Fairyhouse in December. As usual, he attempted to lead from the start but was overtaken at the last hurdle and beaten one and a half lengths by Jezki. In the Grade II Slaney Novice Hurdle at Naas Racecourse in January he started 1/4 favourite but ran poorly and finished third, forty lengths behind the winner Rule The World.

Champagne Fever returned to winning form in the Grade I Deloitte Novice Hurdle at Leopardstown in February. Ridden by Paul Townend, he ran in his customary style, leading throughout the race and winning by one and three quarter lengths from Bright New Dawn at odds of 2/1. The gelding returned to the Cheltenham Festival for the Grade I Supreme Novices' Hurdle on 12 March 2013 and started second favourite alongside Jezki at odds of 5/1 behind the A. P. McCoy-ridden favourite My Tent Or Yours. Ridden by Walsh, he led for most of the race before being overtaken at the final hurdle. He "rallied gamely" to regain the lead on the run-in and won by half a length from My Tent Or Yours, with Jezki two and a quarter lengths back in third. Walsh said "I knew AP was coming to me and I could hear the crowd roar but he jumped like a stag and he stuck his neck out and went away again". Champagne Fever ended his season in the Evening Herald Champion Novice Hurdle at Punchestown in April. He started favourite but was overtaken at the last and finished third behind Jezki and Ted Veale.

=== 2013/2014 National Hunt season: Novice chases ===
In December 2013, Champagne made his first appearance in a steeplechase when he started 4/7 favourite for a novice event at Punchestown. He led from the start and survived two jumping errors to win by four lengths from Corbally Ghost. On 26 December, the grey started 8/15 favourite for the Grade I Racing Post Novice Chase at Leopardstown. He disputed the lead for much of the race but after a bad mistake at the second last he finished third behind Defy Logic and Trifolium. Champagne Fever made his third appearance at the Cheltenham Festival on 11 March when he started 11/4 joint favourite with Trifolium for the Arkle Challenge Trophy in a field which also included the 2012 Champion Hurdle winner Rock On Ruby. He took the lead at the first fence and maintained his advantage until the final strides, in which he was caught and beaten a head by the 33/1 outsider Western Warhorse. On his final appearance of the season, the gelding started 5/4 favourite for the Ryanair Novice Chase at Punchestown but finished sixth of the seven runners behind the British-trained six-year-old God's Own.

=== 2014/2015 National Hunt season: Steeplechases ===
On his first appearance against more experienced chasers, Champagne Fever started 8/11 favourite against six opponents in the Clonmel Oil Chase over two and a half miles on 13 November. Ridden by Paul Townend, he was among the leaders from the start and went clear of his rivals at the second last to win by six lengths from Alderwood with Sizing Europe twelve and a half lengths back in sixth place. Townend said that the winner "jumped like a buck" whilst Mullins expressed himself "delighted" at the performance and added that "the ultimate aim is the Gold Cup". The elding was then sent to England for the King George VI Chase over three miles on 26 December. Starting the 9/2 second favourite, he tracked the leader Silviniaco Conti until the last fence but faded in the closing stages to finish fourth of the eight finishers.

On his return to Ireland he started odds-on favourite for the Kinloch Brae Chase at Thurles, but fell at the last fence when disputing the lead with the eventual winner Don Cossack. In the Red Mills Chase on 14 February, Champagne Fever started 8/15 favourite against four opponents. He took the lead at the ninth of the fourteen fences, opened up a clear advantage, and was eased down by Paul Townend in the closing stages to win by four and a quarter lengths. The gelding was sent to England in March to contest the Queen Mother Champion Chase, but failed to recover from being bitten on the lip by a stablemate on the flight from Ireland and was unable to take part in the race. In April he traveled to Aintree Racecourse for the first time and started joint-favourite for the Melling Chase. He tracked the leaders before moving forward at the fourth last but made a mistake at the next and finished fourth, more than thirty lengths behind the winner Don Cossack. For the third season in succession, Champagne Fever failed to produce his best form at the Punchestown Festival, finishing fifth behind his stablemate Felix Yonger in the Punchestown Champion Chase.

=== 2016/2017 National Hunt season: Steeplechases ===
Champagne Fever did not race in the 2015/16 season. He made his first appearance for 576 days when he ran in the Listed Boomerang Animal Bedding and Boomerang Horse & Country Store Chase over 2 miles and 6 furlongs at Thurles on 24 November 2016. He was sent off 11/8 second favourite in the betting behind Wounder Warrior. Champagne Fever, ridden as usual by Ruby Walsh, won by a head from the 2014 Cheltenham Gold Cup winner, Lord Windermere. Willie Mullins stated after the race "He always runs well on his first run back and we'll probably look for a similar race over two and a half miles".

== Pedigree ==
Pedigree of Champagne Fever, grey gelding, 2007
Sire Stowaway (GB) 1994	Slip Anchor (GB); 1982	Shirley Heights	Mill Reef
Sire Stowaway (GB) 1994	Slip Anchor (GB); 1982	Shirley Heights	Hardiemma
Sire Stowaway (GB) 1994	Slip Anchor (GB); 1982	Sayonara	Birkhahn
Sire Stowaway (GB) 1994	Slip Anchor (GB); 1982	Sayonara	Suleika
Sire Stowaway (GB) 1994	On Credit (FR); 1988	No Pass No Sale	Northfields
Sire Stowaway (GB) 1994	On Credit (FR); 1988	No Pass No Sale	No Disgrace
Sire Stowaway (GB) 1994	On Credit (FR); 1988	Noble Tiara	Vaguely Noble
Sire Stowaway (GB) 1994	On Credit (FR); 1988	Noble Tiara	Tayyara
Dam Forever Bubbles (IRE) 1992	Roselier (FR); 1973	Misti	Medium
Dam Forever Bubbles (IRE) 1992	Roselier (FR); 1973	Misti	Mist
Dam Forever Bubbles (IRE) 1992	Roselier (FR); 1973	Peace Rose	Fastnet Rock
Dam Forever Bubbles (IRE) 1992	Roselier (FR); 1973	Peace Rose	Le Paix
Dam Forever Bubbles (IRE) 1992	Cool Blue (GB); 1976	Deep Run	Pampered King
Dam Forever Bubbles (IRE) 1992	Cool Blue (GB); 1976	Deep Run	Trial By Fire
Dam Forever Bubbles (IRE) 1992	Cool Blue (GB); 1976	Blue Buck	Royal Buck
Dam Forever Bubbles (IRE) 1992	Cool Blue (GB); 1976	Blue Buck	Blue Jirao (Family number 8-a)
