= Newmill (horse) =

Irish-bred Thoroughbred racehorse

- Sire: Norwich
- Grandsire: Top Ville
- Dam: Lady Kas
- Damsire: Pollerton
- Sex: Gelding
- Foaled: 17 April 1998
- Country: Ireland
- Colour: Brown
- Breeder: Veronica O'Farrell
- Owner: Mary Hayes
- Trainer: Thomas O'Leary; John Murphy; James Dullea
- Record: 48:12-7-3
- Earnings: £592,167

Major wins
- Royal Bond Novice Hurdle (2003); Barry & Sandra Kelly Novice Hurdle (2003); Johnstown Novice Hurdle (2004); Paddy Fitpatrick Memorial Novice Chase (2005); Kinloch Brae Chase (2006, 2010); Queen Mother Champion Chase (2006); Kerrygold Champion Chase (2006); Red Mills Trial Hurdle (2006)

Newmill (foaled 17 April 1998) is a retired, Irish Thoroughbred racehorse who competed in National Hunt racing. He reached his peak as an eight-year-old in the spring of 2006 when he won two of the season's most important two-mile steeplechases: the Queen Mother Champion Chase in England and the Kerrygold Champion Chase in Ireland. In his early career, he showed promise as a novice hurdler, winning the Royal Bond Novice Hurdle, Barry & Sandra Kelly Novice Hurdle and Johnstown Novice Hurdle. When switched to chasing, he won the Paddy Fitpatrick Memorial Novice Chase and Kinloch Brae Chase before recording his most important victories. His later career was less successful, although he did win the Red Mills Trial Hurdle in the autumn of 2006 and the Kinloch Brae Chase for a second time as a twelve-year-old in 2010.

== Background ==
Newmill was a dark brown horse with a small white star, bred in Ireland by Veronica O'Farrell. He was the best horse sired by Norwich, a horse who showed his best racing form over seven furlongs (winning the Hungerford Stakes), but who had his greatest stud success as a sire of National Hunt performers. His dam, Lady Kas, won one hurdle race and was a daughter of Lady Dikler, a sister of the Cheltenham Gold Cup winner The Dikler.

In June 2001, the three-year-old gelding was consigned by the Bishopstown Stud to the Tattersalls Ireland sale but attracted no bids and was led out of the auction ring unsold. A year later, he was sent back to the sales at Goffs where he was sold for €24,000 to Mary Hayes. Newmill was sent into training with Thomas Gerard O'Leary at Clonakilty, County Cork.

== Racing career ==
=== 2003/2004 National Hunt season: National Hunt Flat races and Novice Hurdles ===
Newmill began his racing career in National Hunt Flat races, also known as "bumpers", beginning at Fairyhouse Racecourse on 22 April in a race confined to horses sold at Goffs. He started at odds of 10/1 and won easily by three and a half lengths from seventeen opponents. The prize included a new Land Rover Discovery for the vendor of the winner, with the keys to the vehicle being presented to Veronica O'Farrell after the race.

The gelding returned in autumn and ran poorly in a bumper at Tipperary Racecourse before being switched to compete in novice hurdle races. At Wexford Racecourse on 25 October he was ridden by Barry Geraghty he made a successful debut over obstacles a he won easily by seven lengths from Definite Best. The gelding was moved up in class for a Grade III race at Navan Racecourse and finished second to Accordion Etoile and was then stepped up again for the Grade I Royal Bond Novice Hurdle at Fairhouse on 30 November. Ridden by Garrett Cotter, he started at odds of 13/2 in a field which included Accordion Etoile and the Jessica Harrington-trained favourite Strike Back. He led from the start, opened up a big lead, and held on in the closing stages to win by three quarters of a length from the mare Mariah Rollins. Two weeks later at Navan, Newmill was moved up in distance for the Grade II Barry & Sandra Kelly Novice Hurdle (now the Grade I Navan Novice Hurdle over two and a half miles. Ridden by Geraghty, and starting the 5/2 second favourite, he took the lead approaching the second last hurdle before drawing away to win by eight lengths from Kildare, to whom he was conceding seven pounds. On his final appearance of 2003, Newmill finished second when attempting to concede thirteen pounds to Mariah Rollins in the Future Champions Novice Hurdle at Leopardstown Racecourse on 27 December.

Newmill and Mariah Rollins met for the third time in the Deloitte Novice Hurdle at Leopardstown on 8 February. He led the field at the second last hurdle but was caught 100 yards from the finish and beaten three-quarters of a length by Brave Inca, with Mariah Rollins five lengths back in third. Two weeks later, Newmill started 1/2 favourite for the Grade II Johnstown Novice Hurdle at Naas and won by four and a half lengths.

=== 2004/2005 National Hunt season: Novice Chases ===
In the following season, Newmill was moved up to compete in steeplechases with mixed results. He finished fifth behind the mare Like-A-Butterfly at Naas on 20 November and then started 4/6 favourite for a minor event at Clonmel Racecourse, in which he led from the start and won by thirteen lengths. On 26 December he was moved back up to Grade I level for the Durkan New Homes Novice Chase over two miles and a furlong at Leopardstown, but after opening up a clear lead, he faded over the last two fences and finished fifth, thirty-five lengths behind the winner Mariah Rollins. On 9 January he was back at Leopardtsown for the Grade II Paddy Fitzpatrick Memorial Novice Chase and recorded his most important win of the season as he took the lead at the second last fence and won by two lengths from Strong Project. The gelding showed little worthwhile form in his three remaining races: he was pulled up before the last in the Grade I Dr P. J. Moriarty Novice Chase on 6 February and was well beaten when unplaced in both the Nas Na Riogh Novice Chase at Naas and the Grade I Swordlestown Cup Novice Chase at Punchestown in April. Before the last of these races, he was transferred to the stable of John Joseph Murphy at Upton, County Cork; his owners refused to comment on the reason for the switch.

=== 2005/2006 National Hunt season ===
Newmill returned to hurdling in the early part of the 2005/2006 season. He started a 50/1 outsider when finishing fourth behind Brave Inca in the Morgiana Hurdle and then ran third at odds of 40/1 behind Brave Inca and Harchibald (ahead of Macs Joy) in the December Festival Hurdle. In both of these races he was ridden by Andrew McNamara.

On 9 January, Newmill started at odds of 5/1 for the Kinloch Brae Chase over two and a half miles at Thurles Racecourse, in which his opponents included Strong Project, Hi Cloy and Native Upmanship. Ridden by Robbie Power, he was restrained in the early stages before moving up into third place with six fences left to jump. He took the lead at the second last and stayed on to win by four lengths from Mossy Green. Murphy, who had been considering a run in the Champion Hurdle, announced that the gelding was now more likely to run in the Queen Mother Champion Chase, commenting and commented "people have said he is soft in the past, he is actually as tough as nails". Newmill was sent to race in Britain for the first time when he contested the Grade I Queen Mother Champion Chase over two miles at the Cheltenham Festival and started a 16/1 outsider in a field which included Kauto Star and Moscow Flyer. He had been available at odds of 33/1 on the morning of the race but attracted support after he was identified by the Racing Posts "Pricewise" column as a serious contender and "a horse of the highest class". Ridden by McNamara, he made a slight mistake at the first fence but soon took the lead. He went clear of the field approaching the final fence and stayed on strongly in the closing stages to win by nine lengths from Fota Island in a time of 3:51.50. Jim McGrath, writing in the Daily Telegraph described the performance as "a revelation". After the race, McNamara said "That was amazing, I can't believe how well he travelled all the way. I thought we could be in trouble but he got his breath back and down the hill he really started to travel with me again", while Murphy commented "Thank goodness it's over. Everything went right. I got a bit frightened when I saw Central House appear as I thought he might take him on and buzz him up but Andrew did everything correct and was top drawer". Some commentators, however, felt that the falls of several leading contenders, including Kauto Star, meant that Newmill was a rather lucky winner.

On 25 April, Newmill started the 5/4 favourite for the Grade I Kerrygold Champion Chase at the Punchestown Festival. He led from the start, and despite several jumping errors, he was never seriously challenged, winning easily by fifteen lengths from Fota Island, with Mariah Rollins finishing fifth of the six runners. Immediately after the race Murphy suggested that the gelding might be moved up in distance in the next season saying; "We'll play it by ear but we may step him up in trip next season and he could well go to the King George".

=== 2006/2007 National Hunt season ===
Newmill again began his season in a hurdle race, but after leading for most of the way in the Morgiana Hurdle, he dropped back quickly from the second last to finish tailed-off last of the four runners. Murphy attributed his poor run to "a combination of testing ground and lack of fitness". He returned to steeplechasing at Punchestown in February, but fell four fences from the finish in the Tied Cottage Chase. Two weeks later at Gowran Park, he was matched against the leading hurdlers Macs Joy and Harchibald in the Grade II Red Mills Trial Hurdle. Starting at odds of 7/1, he took the lead from the start and went clear of the opposition approaching the last flight to win "comfortably" by eight lengths from Macs Joy. A day after the race, Murphy reported that the gelding was in "sparkling form" and said "he's definitely a better horse this year and they just couldn't stay with him at that relentless gallop".

At Cheltenham in March, Newmill started the 4/1 second favourite as he attempted to repeat his 2006 success in the Queen Mother Champion Chase. He disputed the lead with Ashley Brook for much of the race but weakened after the second last fence and finished fourth, nine lengths behind the winner Voy Por Ustedes. The gelding started 13/8 favourite for the Kerrygold Champion Chase on 24 April but again faded in the closing stages to finish fifth of the even runners.

=== Later career ===
Newmill remained in training for a further four seasons, but failed to recapture his previous success. In the 2007/2008 National Hunt season, he failed to win in seven races. He earned some prize money when last of three in the Normans Grove Chase at Gowran, and when finishing a distant fourth to Voy Por Ustedes in the Melling Chase. In his attempt to regain his Champion Chase title at Cheltenham, he started a 40/1 outsider and finished more than forty lengths behind the winner Master Minded.

In the following season, he failed to reach the first three in six attempts. His best efforts came at Cheltenham, when, as a 100/1 outsider, he finished fourth behind Master Minded, Well Chief and Petit Robin in the Champion Chase and at Killarney Racecourse in May where he was beaten a neck by Snowy Morning.

Newmill ran only three times in the 2009/2010 National Hunt season, but showed some good form. In October, he was beaten by three-quarters of a length when carrying top weight of 161 pounds in a handicap chase at Cork, and in the Connaught Chase at Cheltenham a month later, he was only five lengths behind the winner when fourth to Well Chief, Mahogany Blaze, and Master Minded. In January at Thurles, Newmill started 11/2 third favourite for the Kinloch Brae Chase, a race he had won four years earlier. Ridden by Eddie Power, he was restrained in the early stages before moving up to take the lead at the eighth fence. He stayed on strongly under pressure in the closing stages to record his first steeplechase win in four years, beating Snowy Morning by three lengths. After the race, Murphy said "Eddie gave him a super ride, making the gallop when no-one else would. Age is against him for the top races now, so we'll have to see where he goes". He missed the remainder of the season after sustaining an injury shortly before the Cheltenham Festival.

For his final competitive season, Newmill was moved to the stable of James Daniel Dullea at Bandon. He ran five times as a thirteen-year-old in the early part of 2011, producing his best effort on his seasonal debut in January, when he ran the former Champion Hurdler Sublimity to half a length in a hurdle race at Cork. After three further defeats, he ended his racing career in a hurdle race at Downpatrick Racecourse in March, in which he finished third of the five runners behind Fosters Cross.

== Pedigree ==
Pedigree of Newmill (IRE), brown gelding, 1998
Sire Norwich (GB) 1987	Top Ville (GB); 1976	High Top	Derring-Do
Sire Norwich (GB) 1987	Top Ville (GB); 1976	High Top	Camenae
Sire Norwich (GB) 1987	Top Ville (GB); 1976	Sega Ville	Charlottesville
Sire Norwich (GB) 1987	Top Ville (GB); 1976	Sega Ville	La Sega
Sire Norwich (GB) 1987	Dame Julian (GB); 1976	Blakeney	Hethersett
Sire Norwich (GB) 1987	Dame Julian (GB); 1976	Blakeney	Windmill Girl
Sire Norwich (GB) 1987	Dame Julian (GB); 1976	March Spray	March Past
Sire Norwich (GB) 1987	Dame Julian (GB); 1976	March Spray	Cup Tie
Dam Lady Kas (IRE) 1984	Pollerton (GB); 1974	Rarity	Hethersett
Dam Lady Kas (IRE) 1984	Pollerton (GB); 1974	Rarity	Who Can Tell
Dam Lady Kas (IRE) 1984	Pollerton (GB); 1974	Nilie	Relko
Dam Lady Kas (IRE) 1984	Pollerton (GB); 1974	Nilie	Arctic Melody
Dam Lady Kas (IRE) 1984	Lady Dikler (GB); 1970	Even Money	Krakatao
Dam Lady Kas (IRE) 1984	Lady Dikler (GB); 1970	Even Money	Vendome
Dam Lady Kas (IRE) 1984	Lady Dikler (GB); 1970	Coronation Day	Grand Weather
Dam Lady Kas (IRE) 1984	Lady Dikler (GB); 1970	Coronation Day	Keen Air (Family: 19-c)

- Newmill was inbred 4 x 4 to Hethersett, meaning that this stallion appears twice in the fourth generation of his pedigree.
