= OLBG Mares' Hurdle =

The OLBG Mares' Hurdle, or OLBG.com Mares' Hurdle, is the sponsored title of the following horse races run in Great Britain;

- Yorkshire Rose Mares' Hurdle, a Grade 2 race run at Doncaster Racecourse in January or February
- David Nicholson Mares' Hurdle, a Grade 1 race run at Cheltenham Racecourse in March
