= Native Upmanship Novice Chase =

Steeplechase horse race in Ireland

Pierce Molony Memorial Novice Chase
2026
C'est Ta Chance	Nowwhatdoyouthink	Jalila Moriviere

Previous years
2025
Common Practice	High Class Hero	Drumgill
2024
Mister Policeman	Thecompanysergeant	Lucid Dreams
2023
Flame Bearer	Upping The Anti	Sole Pretender
2022
French Dynamite	Ciel De Neige	The Little Yank
2021
I'm A Game Changer	Whatsnotoknow	Zarkareva

2020-2017
2020
Zero Ten	Dunvegan	Emily Moon
2019
Cubomania	Jetz	Duca De Thaix
2018
Castlegrace Paddy	Jett	Tombstone
2017
Great Field	Hurricane Ben	Alamein

The Native Upmanship Novice Chase is a Grade 3 National Hunt novice chase in Ireland which is open to horses aged five years or older. It is run at Thurles Racecourse over a distance of about 2 miles and 2 furlongs (3,621 metres), and it is scheduled to take place each year in March.

The race was first run in 2017 as the Pierce Molony Memorial Novice Chase in honour of the former manager and owner of Thurles Racecourse.

It was awarded Grade 3 status in 2020.

== Records ==
Leading jockey : (3 wins)

- Paul Townend - Flame Bearer (2023), Mister Policeman (2024), C'est Ta Chance (2026)

Leading trainer: (4 wins)

- Willie Mullins - Great Field (2017), Flame Bearer (2023), Mister Policeman (2024), C'est Ta Chance (2026)

== Winners ==
Year	Winner	Age	Jockey	Trainer
2017	Great Field	6	Jody McGarvey	Willie Mullins
2018	Castlegrace Paddy	7	Andrew Lynch	Pat Fahy
2019	Cubomania	6	Davy Russell	Gordon Elliott
2020	Zero Ten	7	David Mullins	Emmet Mullins
2021	I'm A Game Changer	9	Darragh O'Keefe	Andrew McNamara
2022	French Dynamite	9	Darragh O'Keefe	Mouse Morris
2023	Flame Bearer	8	Paul Townend	Willie Mullins
2024	Mister Policeman	6	Paul Townend	Willie Mullins
2025	Common Practice	6	Simon Torrens	Joseph O'Brien
2026	C'est Ta Chance	7	Paul Townend	Willie Mullins

== See also ==
- Horse racing in Ireland
- List of Irish National Hunt races
