= Johnstown Novice Hurdle =

Hurdle horse race in Ireland

Johnstown Novice Hurdle
2023
Corbetts Cross	Found A Fifty	Walk With Paul

Previous years
2022
Flame Bearer	Meet And Greet	Ha D'Or
2021
Echoes In Rain	Belfast Banter	Desir Du Large

2020-2011
2020
Jason The Militant	Beacon Edge	Andy Dufresne
2019
Chosen Mate	Hannon	Milan Native
2018
Hardline	Impact Factor	Speak Easy
2017
Forge Meadow	Joey Sasa	Any Second Now
2016
Ball D'arc	Moon Over Germany	Don't Touch It
2015
Lean Araig	Modem	All Hell Let Loose
2014
Real Steel	Vicky De L'oasis	Minella Foru
2013
Annie Power	Defy Logic	Don Cossack
2012
Felix Yonger	Dressedtothenines	One Cool Shabra
2011
Dare To Doubt	Prima Vista	Jim Will Fix It

2010-2001
2010
Coole River	Lucky William	Pittoni
2009
Go Native	Roberto Goldback	Kimberlite King
2008
Coolcashin	Raven's Run	Woodbine Willie
2007
Kazal	Callherwhatulike	Notre Pere
2006
Merdeka	Back To Bid	Stoneville
2005
Black Apalachi	Homer Wells	Sweet Kiln
2004
Newmill	Inexorable	Moscow Court
2003
Rosaker	Mossy Green	Central House
2001
Macs Gildoran	Risk Accessor	Harbour Pilot

2000-1991
2000
No Discount	Oa Baldixe	Sackville
1999
Sallie's Girl	Slaney Native	Fadoudal Du Cochet
1998
Ballygowan Beauty	Generosa	Lite 'n Easy
1997
Delphi Lodge	Tarthooth	Difficult Times
1996
The Subbie	Little Buck	Malacca King
1994
Sound Man	Aiybak	Idiots Venture
1993
Atone	Thatch And Gold	New Co
1992
Flashing Steel	Eyelid	Deep Heritage
1991
Mass Appeal	Disputation	Joyful Noise

1990-1988
1990
Grey Danube	Bally Rue	New Mill House
1989
Fourth Of July	Maiden Fair	The Proclamation
1988
Shannon Spray	Furlana Wonder	Capable

The Johnstown Novice Hurdle is a Grade 2 National Hunt hurdle horse race in Ireland. It is run at Naas in February over a distance of about 2 miles and during the race there are eight hurdles to be jumped. The race was first run in 1984 as a Listed race and it was upgraded to Grade 2 in 2003. The race is currently sponsored by Paddy Power bookmakers and has been run under sponsored titles since 2011.

== Records ==
Leading jockey (4 wins):

- Charlie Swan - Mass Appeal (1991), Atone (1993), Sound Man (1994), No Discount (2000)
- Barry Geraghty – Sallie's Girl (1999), Newmill (2004), Merdeka (2006), Kazal (2007)

Leading trainer (5 wins):

- Willie Mullins - Macs Gildoran (2001), Dare To Doubt (2011), Felix Yonger (2012), Annie Power (2013), Echoes In Rain (2021)

== Winners ==
Year	Winner	Jockey	Trainer
1984	Nore Prince	P Gill	R Whitford
1985	Sub-Editor	Frank Berry	J G Murphy
1986	Lough Derg	Tony Mullins	Paddy Mullins
1987	Olan Lad	John Shortt	Homer Scott
1988	Shannon Spray	G M O'Neill	Augustine Leahy
1989	Fourth Of July	Niall Madden snr	Mick O'Toole
1990	Grey Danube	Tommy Carmody	John Mulhern
1991	Mass Appeal	Charlie Swan	Victor Bowens
1992	Flashing Steel	Kevin O'Brien	John Mulhern
1993	Atone	Charlie Swan	J R Cox
1994	Sound Man	Charlie Swan	Edward O'Grady
1996	The Subbie	Conor O'Dwyer	Thomas Foley
1997	Delphi Lodge	Conor O'Dwyer	Tom Taaffe
1998	Ballygowan Beauty	P G Hourigan	Michael Hourigan
1999	Sallie's Girl	Barry Geraghty	Noel Meade
2000	No Discount	Charlie Swan	Charlie Swan
2001	Macs Gildoran	Ruby Walsh	Willie Mullins
2002	Tuco	Norman Williamson	David Wachman
2003	Rosaker	Paul Carberry	Noel Meade
2004	Newmill	Barry Geraghty	Thomas Gerard O'Leary
2005	Black Apalachi	John Cullen	Philip Rothwell
2006	Merdeka	Barry Geraghty	Tom Taaffe
2007	Kazal	Barry Geraghty	Eoin Griffin
2008	Coolcashin	Tom Doyle	Michael Bowe
2009	Go Native	Paul Carberry	Noel Meade
2010	Coole River (Note: The 2010 running took place at Navan after the original fixture at Naas was abandoned)	Robbie Power	Jessica Harrington
2011	Dare To Doubt	Paul Townend	Willie Mullins
2012	Felix Yonger	Ruby Walsh	Willie Mullins
2013	Annie Power	Ruby Walsh	Willie Mullins
2014	Real Steel	Brian O'Connell	Philip Fenton
2015	Lean Araig	Robbie Colgan	Oliver McKiernan
2016	Ball D'Arc	Bryan Cooper	Gordon Elliott
2017	Forge Meadow	Robbie Power	Jessica Harrington
2018	Hardline	Davy Russell	Gordon Elliott
2019	Chosen Mate	Davy Russell	Gordon Elliott
2020	Jason The Militant	Rachael Blackmore	Henry De Bromhead
2021	Echoes in Rain	Paul Townend	Willie Mullins
2022	Flame Bearer	Jack Doyle	Pat Doyle
2023	Corbetts Cross	Donagh Meyler	Emmet Mullins

== See also ==
- Horse racing in Ireland
- List of Irish National Hunt races
