= Red Mills Chase =

Steeplechase horse race in Ireland

Red Mills Chase
2026
Impaire Et Passe	Sa Fureur	Classic Getaway

Previous years
2025
Classic Getaway	Saint Sam	Journey With Me
2024
Saint Sam	Riviere D'etel	Embittered
2023
Janidil	Haut En Couleurs	Capodanno
2022
Melon	Sizing Pottsie	Hardline
2021
Bachasson	Castlegrace Paddy	Spyglass Hill

2020-2011
2020
Chris's Dream	Shattered Love	Snow Falcon
2019
Monalee	Anibale Fly	Edwulf
2018
Our Duke	Presenting Percy	Ballycasey
2017
Ballycasey	Clarcam	Mozoltov
2016
Smashing	Morning Assembly	Ballycasey
2015
Champagne Fever	Texas Jack	Arnaud
2014
Argocat	Turban	Aupcharlie
2013
Chicago Grey	Foildubh	Rubi Light
2012
Rubi Light	Chicago Grey	Apt Approach
2011
Rubi Light	Roberto Goldback	Anothercoppercoast

2010-2001
2010
J'y Vole	Watson Lake	Siegemaster
2009
Glenfinn Captain	Carthalawn	Watson Lake
2008
Ballistraw	Knight Legend	Kicking King
2007
Watson Lake	Mansony	Jim
2006
Forget The Past	Jim	Strong Project
2005
Rathgar Beau	Barrow Drive	The Galway Man
2004
Rathgar Beau	Barrow Drive	Garvivonnian
2003
More Than A Stroll	Arctic Copper	Satchmo
2002
Moscow Express	Northern Sound	Lyreen Wonder
2001
Bob Treacy	Micko's Dream	To Your Honour

2000-1990
2000
Micko's Dream	Bob Treacy	Danoli
1999
Bob Treacy	Anabatic	Stanley Steamer
1998
Anabatic	Wylde Hide	Go Go Gallant
1997
Nuaffe	Le Ginno	Cheslock
1996
Lisselan Prince	Percy Brennan	Stradballey
1994
Bucks-Choice	Three Brownies	Born Deep
1993
Jassu	Dorans Hill Lad	Dagwood
1992
Haki Saki	Garryduff Mover	Mexican Reef
1991
Orbis	Guesswork	Kindly King
1990
Cushinstown	Aughanvilla	Irish Wind

The Red Mills Chase is a Grade 2 National Hunt chase in Ireland. It is run at Gowran Park in February, over a distance of 2 miles and 4 furlongs. Between 1997 and 2002, the race was run over a distance of 3 miles.

== Records ==
Most successful horse (2 wins):

- Bob Treacy - 1999, 2001
- Rubi Light – 2011, 2012

Leading jockey (5 wins):

- Paul Townend - Champagne Fever (2015), Bachasson (2021), Melon (2022), Saint Sam (2024), Impaire Et Passe (2026)

Leading trainer (10 wins):

- Willie Mullins- Micko's Dream (2000), J'y Vole (2010), Champagne Fever (2015), Ballycasey (2017), Bachasson (2021), Melon (2022), Janidil (2023), Saint Sam (2024), Classic Getaway (2025), Impaire Et Passe (2026)

== Winners since 1990 ==
Year	Winner	Jockey	Trainer
1990	Cushinstown	J A Berry (Note: amateur jockey)	David J McGrath
1991	Orbis	Charlie Swan	Jim Bolger
1993	Jassu	D H O'Connor	John E Kiely
1994	Bucks-Choice	Jason Titley	P Mullins
1996	Percy Brennan	Charlie Swan	Dan Swan
1997	Nuaffe	T J Mitchell	Pat Fahy
1998	Anabatic	Tom Rudd	Michael O'Brien
1999	Bob Treacy	Ruby Walsh	Michael Hickey
2000	Micko's Dream	Jason Titley	Willie Mullins
2001	Bob Treacy	John Cullen	Michael Hickey
2002	Moscow Express	Ruby Walsh	Frances Crowley
2003	More Than A Stroll	Conor O'Dwyer	Arthur Moore
2004	Barrow Drive (Note: Rathgar Beau finished first in 2004 but was disqualified after failing a dope test)	David Casey	Anthony Mullins
2005	Rathgar Beau	Shay Barry	Dusty Sheehy
2006	Forget The Past	Barry Geraghty	Michael O'Brien
2007	Watson Lake	Paul Carberry	Noel Meade
2008	Ballistraw	Andrew McNamara	Denis Hickey
2009	Glenfinn Captain	Mark Walsh	Tom Taaffe
2010	J'y Vole	Paul Townend	Willie Mullins
2011	Rubi Light	Andrew Lynch	Robbie Hennessy
2012	Rubi Light	Andrew Lynch	Robbie Hennessy
2013	Chicago Grey (Note: The 2013 race took place at Navan after the original race at Gowran Park was abandoned)	Davy Condon	Gordon Elliott
2014	Argocat	Brian O'Connell	Tom Taaffe
2015	Champagne Fever	Paul Townend	Willie Mullins
2016	Smashing	Davy Russell	Henry de Bromhead
2017	Ballycasey	Ruby Walsh	Willie Mullins
2018	Our Duke	Robbie Power	Jessica Harrington
2019	Monalee	Rachael Blackmore	Henry de Bromhead
2020	Chris’s Dream	Rachael Blackmore	Henry de Bromhead
2021	Bachasson	Paul Townend	Willie Mullins
2022	Melon	Paul Townend	Willie Mullins
2023	Janidil	Rachael Blackmore	Willie Mullins
2024	Saint Sam	Paul Townend	Willie Mullins
2025	Classic Getaway	Danny Mullins	Willie Mullins
2026	Impaire Et Passe	Paul Townend	Willie Mullins

== See also ==
- Horse racing in Ireland
- List of Irish National Hunt races
