= Anaglog's Daughter Mares Novice Chase =

Steeplechase horse race in Ireland

- Class: Grade Two
- Location: Thurles Racecourse; Thurles, Ireland
- Inaugurated: 2003
- Race type: Steeplechase
- Sponsor: Coolmore Stud
- Website: Thurles

Race information
- Distance: 2m 4½f (4,023 metres)
- Surface: Turf
- Track: Right-handed
- Qualification: Five -years-old and up mares
- Weight: 10 st 7 lb (5yo); 11 st 0 (6yo+); Penalties; G1 chase win 7 lb 2 G3 or 1 G2 chase win 5 lb 3 chases or 1 G3 chase 3 lb
- Purse: €57,500 (2020); 1st: €33,925

Coolmore Mares Novice Chase
2026
Jade De Grugy	Tareze	Cottesloe Sunshine

Previous years
2025
Nara	Broomfield Bijou	Judicieuse Allen
2024
Harmonya Maker	Hauturiere	Silent Approach
2022
Ballyshannon Rose	Jeremys Flame	Minella Melody
2021
Colreevy	Mount Ida	Western Victory

2020-2011
2020
Elimay	Cut The Mustard	Agusta Gold
2019
Camelia De Cotte	Grey Waters	Ellie Mac
2018
Dinaria Des Obeaux	Magic Of Light	Youcantcallherthat
2017
Westerner Lady	Daisy's Gift	Not For Burning
2016
Aunt Nora	Queens Wild	Melbourne Lady
2015
Vroum Vroum Mag	Elsie	Toye Native
2014
Byerley Babe	Une Artiste	Caoimhe's Delight
2013
Noras Fancy	Dangan Daylight	Charlie's Vic
2012
Knockfierna	Belle Brook	Dare To Doubt
2011
For Bill	Blazing Tempo	Cool Quest

2010-2003
2010
Tally Em Up	Inistioge	Tilly Ann
2009
Moskova	Leanne	Rory's Sister
2008
Pomme Tiepy	Pip'N Pop	All Heart
2007
Gazza's Girl	Sabina Park	Chicago Vic
2006
Court Leader	Carrigeen Kalmia	American Jennie
2005
Adarma	Nolans Pride	Another Dollar
2004
Stashedaway	Rose Perk	Sheer Frustration
2003
Come In Moscow	Princess Symphony	Be My Belle

The Anaglog's Daughter Mares Novice Chase, currently run as the Coolmore National Hunt Mogul Novice Chase for sponsorship reasons, is a Grade 2 National Hunt novice steeplechase in Ireland which is open to mares aged five years or older. It is run at Thurles over a distance of 2 miles and 4½ furlongs (2 miles 4 furlongs and 118 yard, or 4,131 metres) and during the race there are fourteen fences to be jumped. The race is scheduled to take place each year in January.

The race was first run in 2003, as a Listed race, was awarded Grade 3 status in 2004 and became a Grade 2 race in 2013.

== Records ==
Leading jockey (4 wins):

- Paul Townend - Camelia de Cotte (2019), Colreevy (2021) Allegorie De Vassy (2023), Jade De Grugy (2026)

Leading trainer (8 wins):

- Willie Mullins – Pomme Tiepy (2008), Vroum Vroum Mag (2015), Westerner Lady (2017), Camelia de Cotte (2019), Elimay (2020), Colreevy (2021), Allegorie De Vassy (2023), Jade De Grugy (2026)

== Winners ==
Year	Winner	Age	Jockey	Trainer
2003	Come In Moscow	7	Keith Hadnett	John Joseph Murphy
2004	Stashedaway	7	Davy Russell	Michael O'Brien
2005	Adarma	7	Tony McCoy	Christy Roche
2006	Court Leader	8	Robbie Power	Thomas Mullins
2007	Gazza's Girl	7	Barry Geraghty	Jessica Harrington
2008	Pomme Tiepy	5	Ruby Walsh	Willie Mullins
2009	Moskova	6	Paddy Flood	Paul Nolan
2010	Tally Em Up	7	Davy Russell	Philip Rothwell
2011	For Bill	8	Paul Carberry	Michael Winters
2012	Knockfierna	7	Davy Russell	Charles Byrnes
2013	Noras Fancy	7	Patrick Mangan	James Joseph Mangan
2014	Byerley Babe	7	Philip Enright	Robert Tyner
2015	Vroum Vroum Mag	6	Ruby Walsh	Willie Mullins
2016	Aunt Nora	9	David Mullins	Pat Fahy
2017	Westerner Lady	7	Ruby Walsh	Willie Mullins
2018	Dinaria Des Obeaux	5	Jack Kennedy	Gordon Elliott
2019	Camelia de Cotte	7	Paul Townend	Willie Mullins
2020	Elimay	6	Mark Walsh	Willie Mullins
2021	Colreevy	8	Paul Townend	Willie Mullins
2022	Ballyshannon Rose	9	Jack Kennedy	Paul Fahey
2023	Allegorie De Vassy	6	Paul Townend	Willie Mullins
2024	Harmonya Maker	7	Jack Kennedy	Gordon Elliott
2025	Nara	5	Mark Walsh	Henry de Bromhead
2026	Jade De Grugy	7	Paul Townend	Willie Mullins

== See also ==
- Horse racing in Ireland
- List of Irish National Hunt races
