= Michael Purcell Memorial Novice Hurdle =

Hurdle horse race in Ireland

Michael Purcell Memorial Novice Hurdle
2025
Jacob's Ladder	Joystick	A Tipp For Gold

Previous years
2024
Largy Hill	Staffordshire Knot	Stoke The Fire
2023
Sa Fureur	Buddy One	Knockanard Lady
2022
The Goffer	Berkshire Royal	Captain Conby
2021
Grand Paradis	Goodbye Someday	Fighter Allen

2020-2011
2020
Five O'Clock	Front View	Assemble
2019
Go Another One	Notebook	Denwork
2018
Blow By Blow	Gun Digger	Not Many Left
2017
Tin Soldier	Moulin A Vent	Champagne Classic
2016
Acapella Bourgeois	Nambour	Road To Respect
2015
Sub Lieutenant	Milsean	Total Recall
2014
Giantofaman	Gallant Tipp	Draycott Place
2013
Bright New Dawn	Mala Beach	Jennies Jewel
2012
Lyreen Legend	Folsom Blue	Bridgets Pet
2011
Hidden Cyclone	Pineau De Re	Skorcher

2010-2004
2010
Western Leader	Premier Victory	Kerb Appeal
2009
Clan Tara	The Bishop Looney	Healys Bar
2008
Cooldine	Ballycullen Boy	Deal Maker
2007
Kazal	Chomba Womba	Holly Tree
2006
Mounthenry	Tengo Ambro	One Cool Cookie
2005
Teeming Rain	Sweet Kiln	Chicago Vic
2004
Kim Fontaine	Strike Back	Old Flame

The Michael Purcell Memorial Novice Hurdle is a Grade 3 National Hunt hurdle horse race in Ireland. It is run at Thurles Racecourse in February or March, over a distance of 2 miles and 4 furlongs (4,023 metres) and during the race there are twelve hurdles to be jumped.

The race was first run in 2004. It was previously contested at Grade 2 level before being downgraded to Grade 3 in 2017.

== Records ==
Most successful jockey (4 wins):

- Ruby Walsh – Kim Fontaine (2004), Cooldine (2008), Acapella Bourgeois (2016), Tin Soldier (2017)

Most successful trainer (6 wins):

- Willie Mullins – Kim Fontaine (2004), Cooldine (2008), Tin Soldier (2017), Five O'Clock (2020), Largy Hill (2024), Bon Viveur (2026)

== Winners ==
Year	Winner	Age	Jockey	Trainer
2004	Kim Fontaine	6	Ruby Walsh	Willie Mullins
2005	Teeming Rain	6	David Casey	Charlie Swan
2006	Mounthenry	6	Andrew McNamara	Charles Byrnes
2007	Kazal	6	Barry Geraghty	Eoin Griffin
2008	Cooldine	6	Ruby Walsh	Willie Mullins
2009	Clan Tara	7	Davy Russell	Paul Nolan
2010	Western Leader	6	Conor O'Farrell	John Joseph Hanlon
2011	Hidden Cyclone	6	Andrew McNamara	John Joseph Hanlon
2012	Lyreen Legend	5	Bryan Cooper	Dessie Hughes
2013	Bright New Dawn	6	Davy Russell	Dessie Hughes
2014	Giantofaman	6	Paul Carberry	Dessie Hughes
2015	Sub Lieutenant	6	Barry Geraghty	Sandra Hughes
2016	Acapella Bourgeois	6	Ruby Walsh	Sandra Hughes
2017	Tin Soldier	6	Ruby Walsh	Willie Mullins
2018	Blow By Blow	7	Rachael Blackmore	Gordon Elliott
2019	Go Another One	7	Robbie Power	John C McConnell
2020	Five O'Clock	5	Danny Mullins	Willie Mullins
2021	Grand Paradis	5	Jack Kennedy	Gordon Elliott
2022	The Goffer	5	Jordan Gainford	Gordon Elliott
2023	Sa Fureur	6	Jordan Gainford	Gordon Elliott
2024	Largy Hill	7	Paul Townend	Willie Mullins
2025	Jacob's Ladder (Note: The 2025 running took place at Naas, after the original race at was abandoned because the course was waterlogged)	6	Sam Ewing	Gordon Elliott
2026	Bon Viveur	6	Paul Townend	Willie Mullins

== See also ==
- Horse racing in Ireland
- List of Irish National Hunt races
