= Navan Novice Hurdle =

Hurdle horse race in Ireland

Navan Novice Hurdle
2025
Doctor Steinberg	Thedeviluno	Kovanis

Previous years
2024
The Yellow Clay	Fleur In The Park	Mozzies Sister
2023
Slade Steel	Lecky Watson	Stellar Story
2022
Inthepocket	Three Card Brag	Absolute Notions
2021
Ginto	Eric Bloodaxe	Mr Fred Rogers

2020-2011
2020
Ashdale Bob	Fakiera	Gabynako
2019
Latest Exhibition	Andy Dufresne	Conflated
2018
Easy Game	Getareason	Defi Bleu
2017
Next Destination	Cracking Smart	Jetz
2016
Death Duty	Monalee	Invitation Only
2015
Bellshill	Tycoon Prince	Chesterfieldavenue
2014
No More Heroes	Shaneshill	Couleur France
2013
Briar Hill	Azorian	Only two ran
2012
Pont Alexandre	Busty Brown	Reine Angevine
2011
Boston Bob	Mount Benbulben	Ipsos Du Berlais

2010-2001
2010
Oscars Well	Sweet Shock	Fully Funded
2009
Shinrock Paddy	Rhyl Accord	The Hurl
2008
Mikael D'haguenet	Pandorama	Aura About You
2007
Trafford Lad	Gem Daly	Decoy Daddy
2006
Aran Concerto	Footy Facts	Hollywood Law
2005
Travino	Nicanor	Mossbank
2004
Petertheknot	Sweet Kiln	Our Ben
2003
Newmill	Kildare	Kadiskar
2002
Solerina	Kicking King	Pizarro
2001
Over The Bar	Pietro Vannucci	Bassett Tiger

2000-1994
2000
Harbour Pilot	Trevino	Glens Music
1999
Aldino	Oa Baldixe	Well Ridden
1998
Commanche Court	Cockney Lad	Fishin Joella

The Navan Novice Hurdle is a Grade Two National Hunt hurdle race in Ireland. It is run in mid-December at Navan in Ireland, over a distance of about 2 miles and 4 furlongs (4,023 metres).

The race was first run in 1999 over a distance of 2 miles, before being increased to its present distance in 2000. It was originally run as a Grade 3 race, before being given Grade 1 status in 2004. It was downgraded again from the 2014 running. The race is usually contested by some of the season's top novice hurdlers, who often go on to contest top races at both the Cheltenham Festival and the Punchestown Festival later in the season. Prior to 2010 it was run as the Barry & Sandra Kelly Memorial Novice Hurdle. A race with a similar title was run in 1998, but was not restricted to novices.

== Records ==
Leading jockey (5 wins):

- Ruby Walsh - Boston Bob (2011), Pont Alexandre (2012), Briar Hill (2013), Bellshill (2015), Easy Game (2018)

Leading trainer (8 wins):

- Willie Mullins - Mikael D'Haguenet (2008), Boston Bob (2011), Pont Alexandre (2012), Briar Hill (2013), Bellshill (2015), Next Destination (2017), Easy Game (2018), Doctor Steinberg (2025)

== Winners ==
Year	Winner	Age	Jockey	Trainer
1999	Aldino	5	Charlie Swan	Ronald O'Leary
2000	Harbour Pilot	5	Barry Geraghty	Noel Meade
2001	Over The Bar	5	Charlie Swan	Edward O'Grady
2002	Solerina	5	Paul Carberry	James Bowe
2003	Newmill	5	Barry Geraghty	Thomas O'Leary
2004	Petertheknot	6	Conor O'Dwyer	Patrick Sinnott
2005	Travino	6	John Cullen	Margaret Mullins
2006	Aran Concerto	5	Paul Carberry	Noel Meade
2007	Trafford Lad	5	Tom Doyle	Dusty Sheehy
2008	Mikael D'Haguenet	4	Paul Townend	Willie Mullins
2009	Shinrock Paddy	5	Alain Cawley	Paul Nolan
2010	Oscars Well	5	Robbie Power	Jessica Harrington
2011	Boston Bob	6	Ruby Walsh	Willie Mullins
2012	Pont Alexandre	4	Ruby Walsh	Willie Mullins
2013	Briar Hill	5	Ruby Walsh	Willie Mullins
2014	No More Heroes	5	Barry Geraghty	Gordon Elliott
2015	Bellshill	5	Ruby Walsh	Willie Mullins
2016	Death Duty	5	Bryan Cooper	Gordon Elliott
2017	Next Destination	5	David Mullins	Willie Mullins
2018	Easy Game	4	Ruby Walsh	Willie Mullins
2019	Latest Exhibition	6	Bryan Cooper	Paul Nolan
2020	Ashdale Bob	5	Paddy Kennedy	Jessica Harrington
2021	Ginto	5	Jamie Codd	Gordon Elliott
2022	Inthepocket (Note: The 2022 race was run at Naas after the original Navan fixture was abandoned due to frozen ground)	5	Rachael Blackmore	Henry De Bromhead
2023	Slade Steel	5	Rachael Blackmore	Henry De Bromhead
2024	The Yellow Clay	5	Sam Ewing	Gordon Elliott
2025	Doctor Steinberg	5	Danny Mullins	Willie Mullins

== See also ==
- Horse racing in Ireland
- List of Irish National Hunt races
