= 2018 Irish Greyhound Derby =

2018 Boylesports Irish Greyhound Derby
- Location: Shelbourne Park
- Start date: 17 August
- End date: 22 September
- Total prize money: €300,000 (winner €140,000)

The 2018 Boylesports Irish Greyhound Derby took place during August and September, with the final being held on 22 September at Shelbourne Park. The winner Ballyanne Sim was trained by James Robinson and owned by Eamon Cleary.

The competition was sponsored by Boylesports and the prize money was €300,000, of which €140,000 went to the winner. The winning breeder was Kathleen Pomfret.

== Final result ==
At Shelbourne Park (over 550 yards):

Position	Greyhound	Breeding	Trap	Sectional	SP	Time	Trainer
1st	Ballyanne Sim	Confident Rankin - Freedom Shadow	1	3.31	12-1	29.28	James Robinson
2nd	Magical Bale	Zero Ten - Sizzling Sarah	2	3.36	5-2cf	29.38	Patrick Guilfoyle
3rd	Clona Blaze	Laughil Blake - Coolavanny Pearl	6	3.31	4-1	29.52	Graham Holland
4th	Clonbrien Hero	Razldazl Jayfkay - Trout or Salmon	4	3.46	8-1	29.53	Graham Holland
5th	Slippy Cian	Crash - Global Liberty	3	3.41	5-2cf	29.54	Graham Holland
6th	Jaytee Taylor	Laughil Blake - Toms Delight	5	3.54	5-2cf	29.55	Paul Hennessy

=== Distances ===
1½, 2, shd, hd, hd (lengths) 0.07 sec = one length

== Quarter finals ==
Heat 1 (Sep 8)
Pos	Name	SP	Time
1st	Cabra Hurricane	5-2	29.60
2nd	Jaytee Taylor	5-4f	29.61
3rd	Kilgraney Master	8-1	29.75
4th	Coolavanny Pet	8-1	29.92
5th	Whoops Jack	3-1	30.03
N/R	Jumeirah Charm		

Heat 2 (Sep 8)
Pos	Name	SP	Time
1st	Slippy Cian	2-1f	29.32
2nd	Totos Park	5-2	29.42
3rd	Magical Bale	5-2	29.56
4th	Ballymac Arminta	16-1	29.63
5th	Packing Heat	6-1	29.74
6th	Bakery Lane	12-1	30.23

Heat 3 (Sep 8)
Pos	Name	SP	Time
1st	Newhall Missile	7-1	29.44
2nd	Clonbrien Hero	4-1	29.58
3rd	Drive On Tipp	6-1	29.65
4th	Droopys Floral	12-1	29.82
5th	Lenson Blinder	1-1f	29.86
6th	Doggy Mcdogface	4-1	30.07

Heat 4 (Sep 8)
Pos	Name	SP	Time
1st	Clona Blaze	1-1f	29.46
2nd	Crossfield Will	7-4	29.56
3rd	Ballyanne Sim	6-1	29.77
4th	Coolavanny Gery	9-2	29.78
5th	Beara Gig	20-1	29.85
6th	Jelly Flood	20-1	29.96

== Semi finals ==
First Semi-final (Sep 15)
Pos	Name of Greyhound	SP	Time	Trainer
1st	Magical Bale	4-1	29.66	Patrick Guilfoyle
2nd	Jaytee Taylor	5-2jf	29.68	Paul Hennessy
3rd	Clona Blaze	5-2jf	29.69	Graham Holland
4th	Newhall Missile	7-1	29.72	John Browne
5th	Drive On Tipp	16-1	29.76	Graham Holland
6th	Cabra Hurricane	7-2	29.97	Patrick Guilfoyle

Second Semi-final (Sep 15)
Pos	Name of Greyhound	SP	Time	Trainer
1st	Slippy Cian	7-4f	29.80	Graham Holland
2nd	Ballyanne Sim	10-1	29.81	James Robinson
3rd	Conbrien Hero	5-1	29.88	Graham Holland
4th	Totos Park	2-1	29.91	Graham Holland
5th	Crossfield Will	7-2	29.95	Peter Cronin
6th	Kilgraney Master	14-1	30.16	Thomas Buggy

== Competition report ==
The 12-1 ante-post favourite was from the UK and was the 2018 English Greyhound Derby runner-up Droopys Verve, trained by Angela Harrison. The bookmakers then quoted Borna Gin at 14–1, Puppy Derby champion Magical Bale 16–1, Shelbourne track specialist Lenson Blinder 20-1 and Kirby Memorial Stakes champion Droopys Davy 20–1.

The first ten heats took place on 17 August which resulted in an impressive 10 length win for Droopys Verve in 29.49, a time matched by heat 3 winner Slippy Cian. English Derby finalist Whoops Jack also went well after winning in 29.56. The remaining thirteen heats were completed the following evening and the campaigner Clonbrien Hero won his heat as did the Produce champion Cash Is King, in a fast 29.54. Magical Bale was another winner but it was Lenson Blinder who went fastest in 29.40.

The second round consisted of 16 heats and the first 8 provided many shocks, with the elimination of the two leading contenders Droopys Verve and Borna Gin and the defeat of Lenson Blinder, although the latter did qualify for the next round. The fastest winner was Totos Park in 29.34, with Clona Blaze, Slippy Cian and Jaytee Taylor all recording their second competition wins. The second night of heats provided further wins for Clonbrien Hero, Whoops Jack, Magical Bale and Stonepark Noel but Droopys Davy and Droopys Expert both went out.

The third round provided better luck for the favourites, with Lenson Blinder and Jaytee Taylor justifying short odds and both winning in the equal fastest times of the round (29.39), the former defeated a field including Magical Bale. Totos Park beat Slippy Cian to remain unbeaten, a feat matched by Clona Blaze who won again, pushing Clobnrein Hero into second place.

The fast starting Cabra Hurricane won the first quarter final, inflicting a first defeat on Jaytee Taylor. Kilgraney Master took the third spot but Whoops Jack was eliminated. The second heat was the strongest and saw all three favourites qualify for the semi-finals, Slippy Cian gained revenge on Totos Park in the fastest time of the Derby so far, with Magical Bale taking third but unable to challenge the front two. Newhall Missile claimed heat three from the popular campaigner Clonbrien Hero and Drive on Tipp but the favourite, Lenson Blinder went out because he could not overcome his terrible trap draw from 5. The final heat went to Clona Blaze from Crossfield Will and Ballyanne Sim, leaving Clona Blaze as the only undefeated runner left in the competition.

The two semi-finals were both very strong in terms of line-ups and both were competitive as expected; Magical Bale won the first after winning from Jaytee Taylor and Conna Blaze in a race that saw the first five finish within 10 spots (0.10 sec) of each other. The second heat ended with Slippy Cian catching Ballyanne Sim on the line and Clonbrien Hero ran on well to take the remaining final place.

In the final both Ballyanne Sim and Clona Blaze were both very fast out of the traps, Magical Bale also broke well but Jaytee Taylor missed the break. Ballyanne Sim forged out a lead but Magical Bale looked set to challenge at the third bend but could not find a way past the leader who held on in the fastest time of the competition and the fastest 550 Derby final to date (29.28). All of the other greyhounds recorded good times and made up ground but could not challenge the deserved winner.

== See also ==
- 2018 UK & Ireland Greyhound Racing Year
