= John Meagher Memorial Chase =

Steeplechase horse race in Ireland

John Meagher Memorial Chase
2025
Affordale Fury	Appreciate It	Senecia

Previous years
2024
Fil Dor	Hazelhatch Lady	Only two ran
2023
Classic Getaway	Haut En Couleurs	French Dynamite
2022
Darasso	Escaria Ten	Cilaos Emery
2021
Cilaos Emery	Darver Star	Mamaslittlestar

2020-2011
2020
Presenting Percy	Kemboy	Monalee
2019
Footpad	Mala Beach	Jetz
2018
Alpha Des Obeaux	Valseur Lido	Eight Till Late
2017
Bachasson	Val De Ferbet	Apache Stronghold
2016
Champagne Fever	Lord Windermere	Roi Des Francs
2015
Sir Des Champs	Rubi Light	Lyreen Legend
2014
Home Farm	Foildubh	Maggio
2013
Noble Prince	Realt Dubh	Fosters Cross
2012
Roi Du Mee	Quarryvale	Ballinahow Lady
2011
Joncol	Cooldine	Roberto Goldback

2010-2001
2010
Glencove Marina	Notre Pere	Rare Bob
2009
In Compliance	Chelsea Harbour	Bohemian Lass
2008
War Of Attrition	Carrigeen Kalmia	Rathgar Beau
2007
Forget The Past	Light On The Broom	Our Ben
2006
Public Reaction	Mossy Green	Slim Pickings
2005
Mossy Green	Tiffiny Gale	Kerryhead Windfarm
2004
Oh Be The Hokey	The Young Bishop	Il En Reve
2003
Ride The Storm	Andiamo	Autumn Mist
2002
Spice Patrol	African Waters	Quintus
2001
Brownie Returns	Native Performance	Gold Blaze

2000-1996
2000
Torduff Boy	Joyful River	Jolly John
1999
West Trix	Paddy's Pet	Pharmacy Trio
1998
See Just There	Jimmy Dan	Fairy Mist
1997
Interim Account	Royal Oasis	Another Deadly
1996
Brook Hill Lady	Castalino	Steel Dawn

The John Meagher Memorial Chase is a Listed National Hunt steeplechase in Ireland which is open to horses aged five years or older. It is run at Thurles over a distance of about 2 miles and 6 furlongs (4,426 metres), and it is scheduled to take place each year in November.

The event was formerly a handicap, first run in 1996, and was called the Thurles Handicap Chase. It became a conditions race in 2004, and it was given Listed status in 2009 at which point the race was renamed the Thurles Chase.

It was renamed in 2011 in memory of John Meagher, a great supporter of Thurles, who had one of his biggest days there when Monanore, which he also bred, landed the prestigious Molony Cup when trained by his great friend Billy Harney. A keen amateur rider in his younger days, Meagher was nicknamed ‘Bougoure’ after the legendary Australian jockey Garnet Bougoure, who was attached to the Vincent O'Brien and Paddy Prendergast yards in the late 1950s and early 1960s.

Since 2015 it has been sponsored by the Boomerang Horse & Country Store.

== Records ==
Most successful jockey (4 wins):

- Ruby Walsh - See Just There (1998), Mossy Green (2005), Noble Prince (2013), Champagne Fever (2016)
- Davy Russell- Public Reaction (2006), War of Attrition (2008), Roi du Mee (2012), Alpha des Obeaux (2018)

Most successful trainer (8 wins):

- Willie Mullins– See Just There (1998), Mossy Green (2005), Sir Des Champs (2015), Champagne Fever (2016), Bachasson (2017), Footpad (2019), Cilaos Emery (2021), Classic Getaway (2023)

== Winners ==
Year	Winner	Age	Jockey	Trainer
1996	Brook Hill Lady	7	Charlie Swan	Aidan O'Brien
1997	Interim Account	11	S H O'Donovan	Joseph G Murphy
1998	See Just There	8	Ruby Walsh	Willie Mullins
1999	West Trix VI	8	Patrick Verling	Gerard Cully
2000	Torduff Boy	7	Kieran Gaule	Paul Nolan
2001	Brownie Returns	8	Ken Whelan	Mouse Morris
2002	Spice Patrol	6	Shay Barry	Henry de Bromhead
2003	Ride The Storm	6	Barry Geraghty	Edward O'Grady
2004	Oh Be the Hokey	6	David Casey	Charlie Swan
2005	Mossy Green	11	Ruby Walsh	Willie Mullins
2006	Public Reaction	8	Davy Russell	Edward Hales
2007	Forget the Past	9	Andrew Lynch	Michael O'Brien
2008	War of Attrition	9	Davy Russell	Mouse Morris
2009	In Compliance	9	Paddy Flood	Dessie Hughes
2010	Glencove Marina	8	Barry Geraghty	Eoin Griffin
2011	Joncol	8	Barry Geraghty	Paul Nolan
2012	Roi du Mee	7	Davy Russell	Gordon Elliott
2013	Noble Prince	9	Ruby Walsh	Paul Nolan
2014	Home Farm	7	David Casey	Henry de Bromhead
2015	Sir Des Champs	9	Bryan Cooper	Willie Mullins
2016	Champagne Fever	9	Ruby Walsh	Willie Mullins
2017	Bachasson	6	Paul Townend	Willie Mullins
2018	Alpha des Obeaux	8	Davy Russell	Gordon Elliott
2019	Footpad	7	Daryl Jacob	Willie Mullins
2020	Presenting Percy	9	Jack Kennedy	Gordon Elliott
2021	Cilaos Emery	9	Brian Hayes	Willie Mullins
2022	Darasso	9	Mark Walsh	Joseph O'Brien
2023	Classic Getaway	7	Danny Mullins	Willie Mullins
2024	Fil Dor	6	Jack Kennedy	Gordon Elliott
2025	Affordale Fury	7	Donagh Meyler	Noel Meade

== See also ==
- Horse racing in Ireland
- List of Irish National Hunt races
