= Éamonn Cleary =

Irish hurler

Éamon Cleary is a retired Irish sportsperson.

== Career ==
He played hurling with the Wexford senior inter-county team in the 1980s and won an All Star award in 1989, being picked in the full back position.

== Racing interests ==
He owned and bred the horse that won the Cheltenham Champion Hurdle called Annie Power.

He owns the 2018 Irish Greyhound Derby winner Ballyanne Sim.
