= Kinloch Brae Chase =

Steeplechase horse race in Ireland

Kinloch Brae Chase (Horse & Jockey Hotel Chase)
- Class: Grade Three
- Location: Thurles Racecourse; Thurles, Ireland
- Inaugurated: 1997
- Race type: Steeplechase
- Sponsor: Horse & Jockey Hotel
- Website: Thurles

Race information
- Distance: 2m 4½f (4,131 metres)
- Surface: Turf
- Track: Right-handed
- Qualification: Six-years-old and up
- Weight: 11 st 5 lb Allowances; 7 lb for mares Penalties; G1 chase win 7 lb* 2 G3 or 1 G2 chase win 5 lb* 3 chases or 1 G3 chase 3 lb* *since 1 July 2020
- Purse: €36,500 (2022); 1st: €21,535

Kinloch Brae Chase
2026
| Appreciate It | James Du Berlais | Gentleman De Mee |

Previous years
2025
Appreciate It | Classic Getaway | Blood Destiny
2024
Allaho | Stattler | Appreciate It
2022
Allaho | Fakir D'Oudairies | Notebook
2021
Allaho | Elimay | Annamix

2020-2011
2020
Real Steel | Footpad | Voix Du Reve
2019
Tout Est Permis | Sub Lieutenant | Total Recall
2018
A Toi Phil | American Tom | Woodland Opera
2017
Sizing John | Sub Lieutenant | Black Hercules
2016
Don Cossack | Wounded Warrior | Rubi Light
2015
Don Cossack | Texas Jack | Smokey Joe Joe
2014
Texas Jack | Baily Green | Last Instalment
2013
Quito De La Roque | Roi Du Mee | Joncol
2012
Apt Approach | Follow The Plan | Roberto Goldback
2011
Follow The Plan | Roberto Goldback | J'y Vole

2010-2001
2010
Newmill | Snowy Morning | Florida Express
2009
Cailin Alainn | Glenfinn Captain | Ponmeoath
2008
Hi Cloy | One Cool Cookie | Knight Legend
2007
Forget The Past | Hi Cloy | Mossy Green
2006
Newmill | Mossy Green | Strong Project
2005
Rathgar Beau | Central House | Nil Desperandum
2004
Native Upmanship | Davids Lad | Beachcomber Bay
2003
Native Upmanship | Arctic Copper | Moscow Express
2002
Native Upmanship | Wicked Crack | Killultagh Storm
2001
Slaney Native | Lyreen Wonder | Delphi Lodge

2000-1997
2000
Amberleigh House | Micko's Dream | Foxchapel King
1999
Ferbet Junior | Opera Hat | Micko's Dream
1998
Manhattan Castle | Beakstown | Fiftysevenchannels
1997
Merry Gale | Royal Mountbrowne | The Real Article

The Kinloch Brae Chase, currently run as the Horse & Jockey Hotel Chase, is a Grade 2 National Hunt steeplechase in Ireland. It is run at Thurles Racecourse in late January or early February, over a distance of about 2 miles and 4½ furlongs (2 miles 4 furlongs and 118 yards, or 4,131 metres) and during its running there are 14 fences to be jumped.

The race was first run in 1997. It was downgraded from Grade 2 to Grade 3 in 2017. and returned to Grade 2 status in 2018.

== Records ==
Most successful horse (3 wins):

- Native Upmanship – (2002, 2003, 2004)
- Allaho - (2021, 2022, 2024)

Leading jockey (6 wins):

- Paul Townend - Quito De La Roque (2013), Real Steel (2020), Allaho (2021, 2022, 2024), Appreciate It (2026)

Leading trainer (7 wins):

- Willie Mullins - Apt Approach (2012), Real Steel (2020), Allaho (2021, 2022, 2024), Appreciate It (2025, 2026)

== Winners ==
| Year | Winner | Jockey | Trainer |
|---|---|---|---|
| 1997 | Merry Gale | Conor O'Dwyer | Jim Dreaper |
| 1998 | Manhattan Castle | Charlie Swan | Arthur Moore |
| 1999 | Ferbet Junior | Jason Titley | Jessica Harrington |
| 2000 | Amberleigh House | Paul Carberry | Michael Hourigan |
| 2001 | Slaney Native | Paul Moloney | Jessica Harrington |
| 2002 | Native Upmanship | Barry Cash | Arthur Moore |
| 2003 | Native Upmanship | Conor O'Dwyer | Arthur Moore |
| 2004 | Native Upmanship | Conor O'Dwyer | Arthur Moore |
| 2005 | Rathgar Beau | Shay Barry | Dusty Sheehy |
| 2006 | Newmill | Robbie Power | John Joseph Murphy |
| 2007 | Forget the Past | Andrew Lynch | Michael O'Brien |
| 2008 | Hi Cloy | Tom Doyle | Michael Hourigan |
| 2009 | Cailin Alainn | Niall Madden | Charles Byrnes |
| 2010 | Newmill | Eddie Power | John Joseph Murphy |
| 2011 | Follow The Plan | Patrick Mangan | Oliver McKiernan |
| 2012 | Apt Approach | Ruby Walsh | Willie Mullins |
| 2013 | Quito De La Roque | Paul Townend | Colm Murphy |
| 2014 | Texas Jack | Paul Carberry | Noel Meade |
| 2015 | Don Cossack | Bryan Cooper | Gordon Elliott |
| 2016 | Don Cossack | Bryan Cooper | Gordon Elliott |
| 2017 | Sizing John | Robbie Power | Jessica Harrington |
| 2018 | A Toi Phil | Jack Kennedy | Gordon Elliott |
| 2019 | Tout Est Permis | Sean Flanagan | Noel Meade |
| 2020 | Real Steel | Paul Townend | Willie Mullins |
| 2021 | Allaho | Paul Townend | Willie Mullins |
| 2022 | Allaho | Paul Townend | Willie Mullins |
| 2023 | Fakir D'oudairies | JJ Slevin | Joseph O'Brien |
| 2022 | Allaho | Paul Townend | Willie Mullins |
| 2025 | Appreciate It | Sean O'Keeffe | Willie Mullins |
| 2026 | Appreciate It | Paul Townend | Willie Mullins |

== See also ==
- Horse racing in Ireland
- List of Irish National Hunt races
