= Thurles Racecourse =

Horse racing venue

- Interactive map of Thurles Racecourse
- Location: Thurles, County Tipperary, Ireland
- Coordinates: 52°40′44″N 7°48′50″W
- Owned by: The Molony Family
- Date opened: 1732
- Screened on: Racing TV
- Course type: National Hunt
- Notable races: Horse & Jockey Hotel Chase; Coolmore N. H. Sires Capri Mares Novice Chase; Michael Purcell Memorial Novice Hurdle
- Attendance: 17,273 (2023)

Thurles Racecourse is a horse racing venue in the town of Thurles, County Tipperary, Ireland which stages National Hunt racing.

== History ==
The first recorded race meeting at Thurles occurred in 1732, as noted in a Trinity College document called “Pue's Occurrences”. The meeting was a three-day festival. In the early days of Thurles, there were four race meetings in February, April, June and November, with just 20 stables on site. Since the early 1900s, Thurles has been owned by the Molony family, who still own and operate the course today. Pierce Molony took over the course from a local committee before his son Paddy became manager, and then his son Pierce took over in 1974. In 2015, after Pierce's death, his daughters Patricia, Helen, Anne Marie and Kate, took charge of Thurles alongside their mother Riona.

In more recent times, Thurles hosted 11 fixtures between October and March each year. The course was noted for its resilient ground there can be raced on after all but exceptional amounts of rainfall and it can withstand a large amount of racing during the winter months. Hosting three Grade 2 races, the most significant of which is the Kinloch Brae Chase in January. The race has been won by the likes of Native Upmanship, Newmill, Hi Cloy and Don Cossack. Other notable horses to have raced at Thurles on their way to Cheltenham include Honeysuckle and Sizing John. In 2020, during the COVID-19 pandemic, Thurles featured on British free to air television channel ITV whilst racing in Great Britain was postponed.

In February 2025, Irish jockey Michael O'Sullivan died following a fall at Thurles Racecourse earlier that month.

On 1 August 2025, it was announced by the owners, the Molony family that the course had closed with immediate effect. On 28 August Horse Racing Ireland announced that they would be taking over the operation of the racecourse and that it would remain open until March 2026.

== Course ==
The course is located 1.5 km west of the town centre. The course is an oval right handed track of one and a quarter miles with 6 flights of hurdles and 7 steeplechase fences in each circuit with a steep uphill finish. The course is noted for being sharp and undulating

== Notable races ==
Month	DOW	Race Name	Type	Grade	Distance	Age/Sex
January	Sunday	Horse & Jockey Hotel Chase	Chase	Grade 2	2m 4½f	6yo +
January	Sunday	Coolmore N. H. Sires Capri Mares Novice Chase	Chase	Grade 2	2m 4½f	5yo + m
February	Thursday	Michael Purcell Memorial Novice Hurdle	Hurdle	Grade 2	2m 4f	5yo +
March	Saturday	Pierce Molony Memorial Novice Chase	Chase	Grade 3	2m 2f	5yo +
November	Thursday	John Meagher Memorial Chase	Chase	Listed	2m 6f	5yo +
