= Yorkshire Rose Mares' Hurdle =

Hurdle horse race in Britain

- Class: Grade 2
- Location: Doncaster Racecourse; Doncaster, England
- Race type: Hurdle race
- Sponsor: Irish Thoroughbred Marketing
- Website: Doncaster

Race information
- Distance: 2m 1/2f
- Surface: Turf
- Track: Left-handed
- Qualification: Four-years-old and up fillies & mares
- Purse: £35,000 (2021); 1st: £19,993

Doncaster Mares' Hurdle
2026
Feet Of A Dancer	Dream On Baby	Jetara

Previous years
2025
Jetara	Kateira	Wyenot
2024
Ashroe Diamond	Under Control	Gala Marceau
2023
Epatante	Salsada	Martello Sky
2022
Miss Heritage	Miranda	Western Victory
2021
Miranda	Floressa	Marie's Rock

2020-2011
2020
Lady Buttons	Irish Roe	Floressa
2019
Lady Buttons	Indefatigable	Irish Roe
2018
Maria's Benefit	Irish Roe	Dusky Legend
2017
Vroum Vroum Mag	Midnight Jazz	Coillte Lass
2016
Smart Talk	Lily Waugh	Morning Run
2015
Intense Tango	Pass The Time	Analifet
2014
Annie Power	Doyly Carte	Alasi
2012
Alasi	Jackies Solitaire	Lifestyle

2010-2008
2010
Zarinava	My Petra	Pepite De Soleil
2009
Pagan Starprincess	Chomba Womba	Helens Vision
2008
Chomba Womba	Theatre Girl	Soliya

The Yorkshire Rose Mares' Hurdle is a Grade 2 National Hunt horse race in Great Britain which is open to mares aged four years or older. It is run at Doncaster over a distance of about 2 miles and half a furlong (2 miles and 128 yards or 3,335 metres), and during its running there are eight hurdles to be jumped. The race is scheduled to take place each year in late January or early February. It was first run in 2008.

== Winners ==
Year	Winner	Age	Jockey	Trainer
2008	Chomba Womba	7	Mick Fitzgerald	Nicky Henderson
2009	Pagan Starprincess	5	Barry Keniry	George M. Moore
2010	Zarinava	6	Paul Moloney	Jessica Harrington
2011	Abandoned due to frost
2012	Alasi	8	Dominic Elsworth	Paul Webber
2013	Abandoned due to frost
2014	Annie Power	6	Ruby Walsh	Willie Mullins
2015	Intense Tango	4	Brian Hughes	Karl Burke
2016	Smart Talk	6	Paddy Brennan	Brian Ellison
2017	Vroum Vroum Mag	8	Paul Townend	Willie Mullins
2018	Maria's Benefit	6	Ciaran Gethings	Stuart Edmonds
2019	Lady Buttons	9	Thomas Dowson	Philip Kirby
2020	Lady Buttons	10	Sean Quinlan	Philip Kirby
2021	Miranda	6	Harry Cobden	Paul Nicholls
2022	Miss Heritage	8	Sean Quinlan	Lucy Wadham
2023	Epatante	9	Nico de Boinville	Nicky Henderson
2024	Ashroe Diamond	7	Patrick Mullins (Note: Amateur jockey)	Willie Mullins
2025	Jetara	7	James Bowen	Jessica Harrington
2026	Feet Of A Dancer	7	Sean O'Keeffe	Paul Nolan

== See also ==
- Horseracing in Great Britain
- List of British National Hunt races
