= Native Upmanship =

Irish-bred Thoroughbred racehorse (1993–2024)

- Sire: Be My Native
- Dam: Hi' Upham
- Damsire: Deep Run
- Sex: Gelded male
- Foaled: 1993
- Died: 13 May 2024 (aged 31)
- Country: Ireland
- Colour: Chestnut
- Breeder: John Noonan
- Owner: John Magnier
- Trainer: Arthur Moore
- Record: 53: 16-12-7
- Earnings: £697,528

Major wins
- Land Rover Champion Novice Hurdle (1999); Durkan New Homes Novice Chase (1999); Dr P J Moriarty Memorial Novice Chase (2000); Powers Gold Cup (2000); Fortria Chase (2000); John Durkan Memorial Chase (2000, 2002); Kinloch Brae Chase (2002, 2003, 2004); Melling Chase (2002, 2003); Webster Cup Chase (2005)

Native Upmanship (1993 – 13 May 2024) was a National Hunt racehorse. He was trained in Ireland by Arthur Moore and owned by John Magnier.

== Early career ==
Native Upmanship made his racecourse debut in a National Hunt flat race in February 1998 at Gowran Park, where he finished third behind subsequent Champion Bumper winner Alexander Banquet. He had one more run that season in April, where stepped up on his debut, to win a National Hunt flat race at the Punchestown Festival.

== 1998–99 season ==
Native Upmanship reappeared in the 1998–99 season, where he made his seasonal debut in a Grade 3 Novice Hurdle at Navan in October, finishing fourth. His trainer stepped him up to the top level a month later for the Royal Bond Novice Hurdle, and Native Upmanship finished seventh of eight runners, behind Alexander Banquet. His next outing saw him dropped down considerably in a maiden hurdle, which he won. He then finished second in his next three runs, two of which were at Grade 2 level. In his final run of the season, Native Upmanship went to the Punchestown Festival, where he was sent off an 8/1 chance for the Land Rover Champion Novice Hurdle and won by 5 lengths.

== 1999–2000 season ==
The 1999–2000 season saw Native Upmanship go down the novice chase route. After winning a beginners chase at Navan in November, he won the Durkan New Homes Novice Chase, before another victory in the Dr P J Moriarty Memorial Novice Chase. He then went to the Cheltenham Festival, where he was sent off the 7/2 favourite for the RSA Chase and finished fourth. In his final appearance of the season, he won the Powers Gold Cup.

== 2000–01 season ==
Native Upmanship began the 2000–01 with two victories in the Fortria Chase and the John Durkan Memorial Chase. Following this, he was sent off the favourite for the Lexus Chase and finished a distant fourth behind Rince Ri. In his final two starts of the season, when pulled up in the Irish Hennessy Chase and fourth in the Gold Cup at Fairyhouse. These runs seemed to confirm the opinion that he didn't get the 3-mile trip.

== 2001–02 season ==
The 2001–02 season saw Native Upmanship finish second in his first three runs of the season, in the Fortria Chase, John Durkan Memorial Chase, and Lexus Chase. He then won the Kinloch Brae Chase in January 2002, before going to the Cheltenham Festival, where he finished second to Flagship Uberalles in the Queen Mother Champion Chase. In his next start, which was over a more adequate trip of 2 miles and 4 furlongs, he won the Melling Chase. In his final start of the season, his trainer again stepped him up to 3 miles plus, for the Punchestown Gold Cup, where he finished second to Florida Pearl.

== 2002–03 season ==
The 2002–03 season saw Native Upmanship follow a near identical path to the previous one. After finishing second in his seasonal debut at Naas, he won the John Durkan Memorial Chase again, before going to Kempton for the first time to contest the King George VI Chase, where he finished fifth to Best Mate. He then won his second successive Kinloch Brae Chase, before returning to the Cheltenham Festival, where he again finished second in the Queen Mother Champion Chase, this time behind Moscow Flyer. He returned to Aintree, where he won his second successive Melling Chase. He again finished the season contesting the Punchestown Gold Cup, where he finished third behind First Gold, seemingly failing to see out the trip again.

== 2003–04 season ==
The 2003–04 season saw Native Upmanship make his seasonal debut in the John Durkan Memorial Chase, where he finished fifth behind Beef Or Salmon. After winning the Kinloch Brae Chase again, he finished third in both the Newlands Chase and the Melling Chase. He completed the season with a fourth place behind Moscow Flyer in the Punchestown Champion Chase.

== Final two seasons ==
Over the next two seasons, Native Upmanship continued to run in the top races in both Ireland and England, including the 2006 Grand National, but he won only one, in a Grade 3 race at Navan in April 2005. After finishing last of 6 runners in the 2006 Punchestown Gold Cup, he was retired.

== Death ==
Native Upmanship died on 13 May 2024, at the age of 31.

== See also ==
- List of British National Hunt races
