= Wexford Racecourse =

Horse racing venue in Ireland

Wexford Racecourse is a horse racing venue in the town of Wexford, Ireland which stages National Hunt racing. The earliest record of racing in the area is in the 1870s.

The course formerly staged Flat racing as well as National Hunt but on 1 June 2016 it was announced that with immediate effect Flat racing would be discontinued. This followed the track being switched from right-handed to left-handed in 2015. The course is an undulating left-handed course of one mile and two furlongs.
