= 2025 Cheltenham Gold Cup =

Horse race in Britain

- Cheltenham Gold Cup
- Location: Cheltenham Racecourse
- Date: 14 March 2025
- Winning horse: Inothewayurthinkin
- Starting price: 15/2
- Jockey: Mark Walsh
- Trainer: Gavin Cromwell
- Owner: J. P. McManus
- Conditions: Good to soft

The 2025 Cheltenham Gold Cup (known as the Boodles Cheltenham Gold Cup for sponsorship reasons) was the 97th annual running of the Cheltenham Gold Cup horse race and was held at Cheltenham Racecourse, Gloucestershire, England, on 14 March 2025.

The race was won by 15/2 Inothewayurthinkin, owned by J. P. McManus, trained by Gavin Cromwell and ridden by Mark Walsh. Inothewayurthinkin won by six lengths, denying Galopin Des Champs a hat-trick of wins.
