= Lombardstown Mares Novice Chase =

Steeplechase horse race in Ireland

Lombardstown Mares Novice Chase
2025
Kala Conti	Kargese	Jalila Moriviere

Previous years
2024
Only By Night	Nara	Karia Des Blaises
2023
Silent Approach	Harmonya Maker	Zenta
2022
Impervious	Dinoblue	Roseys Hollow
2021
Concertista	Jeremys Flame	Magic Daze

2020-2011
2020
Mount Ida	Scarlet And Dove	Jeremys Flame
2019
Elimay	Agusta Gold	Tintangle
2018
Camelia De Cotte	Moyhenna	High School Days
2017
Shattered Love	La Bella Vida	Montana Belle
2016
Listen Dear	Misty Lady	Annamatopoeia
2015
Queens Wild	Perfect Woman	Emcon
2014
Vroum Vroum Mag	Our Katie	Vole Au Vent
2013
Dressedtothenines	Kates Benefit	Caoimhe's Delight
2012
Great Oak	Our Girl Lucy	Glibin
2011
Knockfierna	Shop Dj	Our Victoria

2010-2004
2009
Royal Choice	Brave Betsy	Hello Kitty
2008
Hill Fairy	Brotenstown	Moskova
2007
Pomme Tiepy	Outlaw Princess	All Heart
2006
Lala Nova	Chicago Vic	Banna's
2005
American Jennie	Newtown Dancer	Court Leader
2004
Adarma	The Screamer	Glacial Gillette

The Lombardstown Mares Novice Chase is a Grade 3 National Hunt novice steeplechase in Ireland which is open to mares aged four years or older. It is run at Cork over a distance of about 2 miles and half a furlong (2 miles and 160 yards, or 3,365 metres). The race is scheduled to take place each year in December. Since 2014 the race has been sponsored by the Kerry Group and run as the Kerry Group European Breeders Fund Mares Novice Chase.

The race was first run in 2004, and was awarded Grade 3 status in 2009 and Grade 2 status in 2021.

== Records ==
Leading jockey (3 wins):

- Paul Townend – Vroum Vroum Mag (2014), Listen Dear (2016), Camelia de Cotte (2018)

Leading trainer (6 wins):

- Willie Mullins - Pomme Tiepy (2007), Vroum Vroum Mag (2014), Listen Dear (2016), Camelia de Cotte (2018), Elimay (2019), Concertista (2021)

== Winners ==
Year	Winner	Age	Jockey	Trainer
2004	Adarma	6	Tony McCoy	Christy Roche
2005	American Jennie	7	Davy Russell	Michael Cullen
2006	Lala Nova	7	Sean McDermott	John Joseph Murphy
2007	Pomme Tiepy	4	David Casey	Willie Mullins
2008	Hill Fairy	6	Kevin Coleman	John Morrison
2009	Royal Choice	5	Andrew Lynch	Henry de Bromhead
2010	no race 2010 (Note: The 2010 running was abandoned due to the chase course being frozen)
2011	Knockfierna	6	Davy Russell	Charles Byrnes
2012	Great Oak	6	Mark Enright	John W Nicholson
2013	Dressedtothenines	6	Niall Madden	Edward P Harty
2014	Vroum Vroum Mag	5	Paul Townend	Willie Mullins
2015	Queens Wild (Note: The 2015 running was run at Navan after the original race at Cork was abandoned)	5	Adrian Heskin	Edward P Harty
2016	Listen Dear	6	Paul Townend	Willie Mullins
2017	Shattered Love	6	Jack Kennedy	Gordon Elliott
2018	Camelia de Cotte	6	Paul Townend	Willie Mullins
2019	Elimay	5	Mark Walsh	Willie Mullins
2020	Mount Ida	6	Denis O'Regan	Gordon Elliott
2021	Concertista	7	Sean O'Keeffe	Willie Mullins
2022	Impervious	6	Brian Hayes	Colm Murphy
2023	Silent Approach	5	Danny Mullins	Con O'Keeffe
2024	Only By Night	6	Sean Flanagan	Gavin Cromwell
2025	Kala Conti	5	Jack Kennedy	Gordon Elliott

== See also ==
- Horse racing in Ireland
- List of Irish National Hunt races
