= Tara Hurdle =

Hurdle horse race in Ireland

Tara Handicap Hurdle
2021
Futurum Regem	Sassy Yet Classy	Bread And Butter

Previous years
2020
Jukebox Jive	King Alex	Tintangle
2019
Alfa Mix	Top Moon	Drumacoo
2018
Salty Boy	Golden Jewel	Dromore Lad
2017
Diamond Cauchois	Fine Rightly	Grand Partner
2016
Automated	Scoir Mear	Gurteen
2015
Rossvoss	Bentelimar	Jimmy Two Times
2014
Lite Duties	Dara Tango	Jennies Jewel
2013
Jennies Jewel	He'llberemembered	Call Me Bubbles
2012
Owega Star	Maller Tree	Whatuthink
2011
Zaidpour	Benash	Powerstation
2010
Rigour Back Bob	Stonemaster	Alpine Glade
2009
Donnas Palm	Give It Time	Chicago Grey
2008
Shakervilz	Aitmatov	Give It Time
2007
Jazz Messenger	Sweet Kiln	Adamant Approach
2006
Celestial Wave	Southern Vic	Mounthenry
2005
Solerina	Emotional Moment	Baron De Feypo
2004
Solerina	Hardy Eustace	Rosaker
2003
Solerina	Rosaker	Florida Coast

The Tara Hurdle was a Grade 2 National Hunt hurdle race in Ireland until 2013, when it was downgraded to a Grade B handicap. It is run at Navan Racecourse in December, over a distance of 2 miles and 4 furlongs. The race was first run in 1999.

== Records ==
Most successful horse (3 wins):

- Limestone Lad – 1999, 2001, 2002
- Solerina – 2003, 2004, 2005

Leading jockey (3 wins):

- Paul Carberry – Limestone Lad (2001, 2002), Jazz Messenger (2007)

Leading trainer (6 wins):

- James Bowe – Limestone Lad (1999, 2001, 2002), Solerina (2003, 2004, 2005)

== Winners since 1999 ==
Year	Winner	Age	Weight	Jockey	Trainer
1999	Limestone Lad	7	11–07	Shane McGovern	James Bowe
2000	Sallie's Girl	7	10–07	Barry Geraghty	Noel Meade
2001	Limestone Lad	9	11–12	Paul Carberry	James Bowe
2002	Limestone Lad	10	11–12	Paul Carberry	James Bowe
2003	Solerina	6	11–07	Gary Hutchinson	James Bowe
2004	Solerina	7	11–07	Gary Hutchinson	James Bowe
2005	Solerina	8	11–07	Gary Hutchinson	James Bowe
2006	Celestial Wave	6	11–03	Timmy Murphy	Adrian Maguire
2007	Jazz Messenger	7	11–12	Paul Carberry	Noel Meade
2008	Shakervilz	5	11–08	Paul Townend	Willie Mullins
2009	Donnas Palm	5	11–08	Barry Geraghty	Noel Meade
2010	Rigour Back Bob	5	11–08	Andrew McNamara	Edward O'Grady
2011	Zaidpour	5	11–12	Ruby Walsh	Willie Mullins
2012	Owega Star	5	11–05	Andrew Leigh	Peter Fahey
2013	Jennies Jewel	6	11–00	Ian McCarthy	Jarlath P Fahey
2014	Lite Duties	5	10–06	Philip Enright	Charles Byrnes
2015	Rossvoss	7	9–10	Katie Walsh (Note: amateur jockey)	Ted Walsh
2016	Automated	5	10-10	Bryan Cooper	Gordon Elliott
2017	Diamond Cauchois	6	10–12	Davy Russell	Gordon Elliott
2018	Salty Boy	5	10–07	David Mullins	Margaret Mullins
2019	Alfa Mix	4	09–13	Jonathan Moore	Gavin Cromwell
2020	Jukebox Jive	6	10–11	Conor McNamara	Gavin Cromwell
2021	Futurum Regem	5	09–05	Neil Ryan	Hugh Paul Finegan
2022	San Salvador	6	10-10	JJ Slevin	Joseph O'Brien
2023	Harvard Guy	5	10–07	Mark Walsh	Eddie & Patrick Harty
2024	Sequoiaspirit	7	10–09	Liam Quinlan	Ray Hackett
2025	Paddy's Milestone	6	09–10	Stephen Connor (Note: amateur jockey)	Stuart Crawford

== See also ==
- Horse racing in Ireland
- List of Irish National Hunt races
