= Rule Supreme =

Irish-bred Thoroughbred racehorse

- Sire: Supreme Leader
- Grandsire: Bustino
- Dam: Book of Rules
- Damsire: Phardante
- Sex: Gelding
- Foaled: 28 February 1996
- Country: Ireland
- Colour: Bay
- Breeder: Mary Murphy & H. T. Murphy
- Owner: John P Lynch; John J Fallon; Michael Winters
- Trainer: Pat Hughes; Willie Mullins
- Record: Hurdles: 19:4-5-6; Chases: 17:4-2-2; PTP: 10:3-2-2; Total:46:11-9-10
- Earnings: £490,881

Major wins
- Royal & SunAlliance Chase (2004); Grande Course de Haies d'Auteuil (2004); Hennessy Gold Cup (2005)

Rule Supreme (foaled 28 February 1996) is a retired, Irish Thoroughbred racehorse who competed in National Hunt racing. During a racing career which lasted from May 2001 until December 2009 he won eleven of his forty-six races (including Grade I victories in three countries) and was placed on nineteen occasions. He showed some promise in his early career but emerged as a top-class performer in 2004 when he won the Royal & SunAlliance Chase at Cheltenham Racecourse in England and the Grande Course de Haies d'Auteuil at Auteuil Hippodrome in France. In the following year he won the Hennessy Gold Cup at Leopardstown Racecourse in Ireland. After his career in National Hunt races was ended by injury he had some success on the amateur Point-to-point circuit.

== Background ==
Rule Supreme is a bay gelding bred in Ireland by Mary and H T Murphy. He was sired by Supreme Leader, a high-class flat racer who won the Earl of Sefton Stakes and the Westbury Stakes as well as finishing third in the 2000 Guineas and fourth in The Derby. He later became a very successful sire of National Hunt performers including Keen Leader (Reynoldstown Novices' Chase), Fundalentalist (Royal & SunAlliance Chase), Fota Island (Grand Annual Chase), What's Up Boys (Coral Cup), Pettifour (Sefton Novices' Hurdle) and Supreme Glory (Welsh Grand National). Rule Supreme's dam, Book of Rules, was an unraced mare who produced at least two other winners.

As a three-year-old in June 1999, Rule Supreme was sent to the Tattersalls Ireland sales where he was bought for 57,000 guineas by John Lynch. The gelding was sent into training with Pat Hughes at Bagenalstown, County Carlow.

== Racing career ==
=== 2001/2002 National Hunt season: Novice Hurdles ===
Rule Supreme began his racing career by finishing third in a novice hurdle race at Wexford Racecourse on 4 May 2001 in which he finished third of the fifteen runners. He returned in autumn, and was unplaced in races at Gowran Park and Down Royal before showing improved form to finish second at Navan and Punchestown. On 29 December he started 11/4 favourite for a maiden hurdle over two and a half miles at Leopardstown Racecourse. Ridden by Charlie Swan he led from the start and recorded his first victory as he won by ten lengths despite being eased down in the closing stages.

Rule Supreme returned in March to finish second in novice events at Punchestown and Fairyhouse: in the latter event he was beaten five lengths by the subsequent Grade I winner Davenport Milenium. The gelding returned to Fairyhouse on 17 April for a two and a half mile novice hurdle and started 4/6 favourite against nine opponents. Ridden again by Swan, he led for most of the way and held off the challenge of Four Aces to win by a length. He ended his season ten days later by finishing fourth over three miles at Punchestown.

=== 2002/2003 National Hunt season: Novice Chases ===
For the 2002/2003 season Rule Supreme was transferred to the stable of Willie Mullins and was campaigned in novice steeplechases. He made only two appearances, finishing a close fourth at Leopardstown in January and fifth, beaten thirty lengths by Adamant Approach at Cork Racecourse in April.

=== 2003/2004 National Hunt season ===
Having failed to win two starts in early 2003, Rule Supreme was still eligible for novice chases in the 2003/2004 season which began in April. At the end of that month he carried 161 pounds in handicap race for novices over three miles and a furlong at Punchestown. Ridden by David Casey made steady progress over the last six fences before overtaking his better-fancied stable companion Hedgehunter in the closing stages and winning by three and a half lengths. In the last race of his spring campaign, Rule Supreme started 4/7 favourite at Gowran Park but fell at the eighth fence when in third place.

After a break of more than six months, Rule Supreme returned at Thurles Racecourse in December when he won the Glen Chase, beating more experienced rivals by four lengths when ridden by Ruby Walsh. Three weeks later he was moved up in class when he was sent to England for the Grade I Feltham Novices' Chase at Kempton Park Racecourse. Ridden by A. P. McCoy, he lost touch with the leaders in the closing stages and was the last of the three finishers behind the Paul Nicholls-trained favourite Strong Flow. In the early part of 2004, the gelding was again campaigned in handicap company and ran well without winning, finishing third when attempting to conceded eleven pounds to Hedgehunter at Gowran Park and second when conceding thirty pounds to Coq Hardi Diamond in the Grand National Trial at Punchestown.

Rule Supreme was sent to England for the second time to contest the Grade I Royal & SunAlliance Chase on 17 March at the Cheltenham Festival. He was ridden by Casey and started a 25/1 outsider for a race whose leading contenders appeared to be Our Vic (winner of the Reynoldstown Novices' Chase), Pizarro (Champion Bumper) and Royal Emperor (Towton Novices' Chase). Rule Supreme did not jump well and was towards the rear of the field for most of the way, but began to make progress approaching the second last fence where Mossy Green fell and brought down Pizarro. He overtook Old Vic after the last fence and held off a challenge from Royal Emperor to win by one and a quarter lengths. After the race Mullins said "He'll probably go to Punchestown and then possibly the French Champion Hurdle, then next year we might seriously consider the Stayers' Hurdle. The ability is there for a Gold Cup, but probably not the scope for it with his jumping. He's got a tremendous engine, but is a scrappy jumper". Rule Supreme returned to England again in April, unseating Casey when he made a bad jumping mistake in the Mildmay Novices' Chase at Aintree, and finishing fifth when carrying 164 pounds in the Betfred Gold Cup at Sandown Park on the last day of the season.

Four days after his defeat at Sandown, Rule Supreme started a 20/1 outsider and finished fifth of the six runners behind Beef Or Salmon in the Grade I Punchestown Gold Cup. The National Hunt season in Britain and Ireland then went into the summer break, but Rule Supreme remained active and was sent to race in France. On 30 May he was ridden by Casey and started a 41/1 outsider for the Grade II Prix La Barka over 4300 metres at Auteuil Hippodrome. Racing on very soft ground, he took the lead two hurdles from the finish and kept on after being overtaken to finish third behind Great Love and Nickname. Three weeks later he faced Great Love and Nickname again, as well as the leading steeplechasers Kotkijet and Batman Senora in France's most important hurdle race, the Grande Course de Haies d'Auteuil over 5100 metres. Casey restrained the gelding towards the back of the seven runner field before moving up to dispute the lead three hurdles from the finish. He took the lead 150 metres from the finish and won by two lengths from Great Love, with Kotkijet two and a half lengths back in third place. Mullins was unable to attend, after contracting food poisoning on his previous visit to France but John Lynch, the gelding's owner was reportedly "ecstatic", saying "They said that Kotkijet was unbeatable! This shows what a great trainer Willie Mullins is. After Punchestown, Rule Supreme had a ten-day break and put on so much weight that people thought he was pregnant!"

=== 2004/2005 National Hunt season ===
In the autumn of 2004, Rule Supreme was campaigned in long distance hurdle races, beginning with a win under top weight of 165 pounds in a handicap at Clonmel Racecourse on 18 November. He then finished third behind Solerina and Brave Inca in the Hatton's Grace Hurdle and was sent to England in December where he finished third again beaten less than a length by the French-trained Baracouda in the Long Walk Hurdle at Windsor Racecourse. He returned to steeplechasing later in the month for the Lexus Chase at Leopardstown in which he was matched against Beef Or Salmon and the three time Cheltenham Gold Cup winner Best Mate. He was disputing second place with Best Mate, some way behind Beef Or Salmon, when he fell at the second last fence.

On 6 February 2005 Rule Supreme met Beef Or Salmon again in the Hennessy Cognac Gold Cup over three miles on soft ground at Leopardstown and was made the 11/2 second favourite. Casey positioned the gelding in fourth place, moved up to third with six fences left to run and was left in second place behind Murphy's Cardinal when Pizarro fell at the next obstacle. He took the lead three fences from the finish but was soon joined by Beef Or Salmon, the 8/15 favourite. Rule Supreme regained the advantage at the last fence and drew away on the run-in to win by fourteen lengths. After the race Casey said "He kept coming for me today and he was very good. The horse is very well in himself and we always knew he had the ability to win a race like this. I know he stays all day so I though I would put it up to Beef or Salmon and see what happened". Mullins reiterated his belief that the gelding had "a huge engine", but admitted that "jumping is just not his forte".

At the Cheltenham Festival in March, Rule Supreme bypassed the Cheltenham Gold Cup and reverted to hurdling, starting 4/1 second favourite for the World Hurdle. In a strong renewal of Britain's most prestigious race for long distance hurdlers, he was restrained by Casey in the early stages before staying on in the closing stages to finish third behind Inglis Drever and Baracouda. At Aintree three weeks later he started 2/1 favourite for the Liverpool Hurdle, but unseated Ruby Walsh after being hampered at the second hurdle. On 27 April, Rule Supreme was matched against the Cheltenham Gold Cup winner Kicking King in the Punchestown Gold Cup. He finished second, three lengths behind the Gold Cup winner, but fifteen lengths clear of the other runners.

As in the previous season, Rule Supreme was sent to contest the major French hurdle races in the summer. On 29 May, he repeated his performance of 2004 by finishing third in the Prix La Barka beaten two lengths and six lengths by Rock and Palm and Cyrlight. On 18 June he attempted to win the Grande Course de Haies for a second time, but after disputing the lead for much of the way he was beaten four lengths into second place by the six-year-old Lycaon de Vauzelle.

=== Later career ===
Rule Supreme missed the next two seasons with injury problems returning as a twelve-year-old in the early part of 2008. He finished unpaced behind Hi Cloy in the Grade II Kinloch Brae Chase at Thurles in January and was last of the eight runners behind The Listener in the Hennessy Gold Cup a month later.

In 2009 Rule Supreme was bought by Michael Winters and competed in the amateur Point-to-point circuit. He ran ten times, winning races at Dawstown, Ballindenisk and Ballingarry.

== Pedigree ==
Pedigree of Rule Supreme (IRE), bay gelding, 1996
Sire Supreme Leader (GB) 1982	Bustino (GB); 1971	Busted	Crepello
Sire Supreme Leader (GB) 1982	Bustino (GB); 1971	Busted	Sans Le Sou
Sire Supreme Leader (GB) 1982	Bustino (GB); 1971	Ship Yard	Doutelle
Sire Supreme Leader (GB) 1982	Bustino (GB); 1971	Ship Yard	Paving Stone
Sire Supreme Leader (GB) 1982	Princess Zena (GB); 1975	Habitat	Sir Gaylord
Sire Supreme Leader (GB) 1982	Princess Zena (GB); 1975	Habitat	Little Hut
Sire Supreme Leader (GB) 1982	Princess Zena (GB); 1975	Guiding Light	Crepello
Sire Supreme Leader (GB) 1982	Princess Zena (GB); 1975	Guiding Light	Arbitrate
Dam Book of Rules (IRE) 1989	Phardante (FR); 1982	Pharly	Lyphard
Dam Book of Rules (IRE) 1989	Phardante (FR); 1982	Pharly	Comely
Dam Book of Rules (IRE) 1989	Phardante (FR); 1982	Pallante	Taj Dewan
Dam Book of Rules (IRE) 1989	Phardante (FR); 1982	Pallante	Cavadonga
Dam Book of Rules (IRE) 1989	Chapter Four (GB); 1971	Shackleton	Sayajirao
Dam Book of Rules (IRE) 1989	Chapter Four (GB); 1971	Shackleton	Caspian Sea
Dam Book of Rules (IRE) 1989	Chapter Four (GB); 1971	First Edition	Cacador
Dam Book of Rules (IRE) 1989	Chapter Four (GB); 1971	First Edition	Scriptina (Family: 4-d)
