= For Auction Novice Hurdle =

Hurdle horse race in Ireland

For Auction Novice Hurdle
2026
Thinkitdontjinxit	State Pension	Joe Cool

Previous years
2025
I'll Sort That	Theflyingking	Whimsy
2024
Bleu De Vassy	Mr Percy	Patter Merchant
2023
What's Up Darling	Dee Capo	She's A Fine Wine
2022
Hercule Du Seuil	Imagine	Three Card Brag
2021
My Mate Mozzie	Chemical Energy	Ferdia

2020–2011
2020
N'golo	Annexation	Wide Receiver
2019
Abacadabras	Latest Exhibition	Foreign Secretary
2018
Aramon	Magnium	Choungaya
2017
Mengli Khan	Stratum	Morgan
2016
Labaik	Mick Jazz	Le Martalin
2015
Three Stars	Thomas Hobson	Tycoon Prince
2014
Mckinley	Fort Smith	Princely Conn
2013
Minella Foru	Very Wood	King of The Picts
2012
Sizing Rio	Ted Veale	Celtic Cailin
2011
Il Fenomeno	Dylan Ross	Burn And Turn

2010–2001
2010
Hidden Cyclone	Hazeymm	Maggio
2009
Judge Roy Bean	The Hurl	Alice Bradys Call
2008
Academy Sir Harry	Fisher Bridge	No Full
2007
Quinmaster	Meadow Vale	Lyceum
2006
Clopf	Aitmatov	Gleann An Sagart
2005
O'Muircheartaigh	Alpha Royale	Up Above
2004
Wild Passion	Justified	The Railway Man
2003
Accordion Etoile	Newmill	Green Belt Flyer
2002
Native Sparkle	Nonchalant	Banasan
2001
Golden Row	Lord Edwards Army	Hill Port

2000–1997
2000
Aunt Aggie	Sparkling Gold	Pillar Rock
1999
Very Tempting	Admiral Wings	Market Legacy
1998
To Your Honour	Samapour	Kings Banquet
1997
Go Roger Go	Aboriginal	Texarkana

The For Auction Novice Hurdle is a Grade 3 National Hunt novice hurdle race in Ireland which is open to horses aged four years or older. It is run at Navan over a distance of about 2 miles (3,218 metres). The race is scheduled to take place each year in November.

The race was first run in 1997, and was awarded Grade 3 status in 2003.

== Records ==
Leading jockey (4 wins):

- Barry Geraghty – Aunt Aggie (2000), O'Muircheartaigh (2005), Clopf (2006), Academy Sir Harry (2008)

Leading trainer (6 wins):

- Gordon Elliott - Labaik (2016), Mengli Khan (2017), Abacadabras (2019), What's Up Darling (2023), Bleu De Vassy (2024), Thinkitdontjinxit (2026)

== Winners ==
Year	Winner	Age	Jockey	Trainer
1997	Go Roger Go		Norman Williamson	Edward O'Grady
1998	To Your Honour		F J Flood	Francis Flood
1999	Very Tempting	4	R P McNally	P Hughes
2000	Aunt Aggie	5	Barry Geraghty	Edward O'Grady
2001	Golden Row	7	P P O'Brien	Charles Byrnes
2002	Native Sparkle	5	K Hadnett	Tom Hogan
2003	Accordion Etoile	4	J L Cullen	Paul Nolan
2004	Wild Passion	4	Paul Carberry	Noel Meade
2005	O'Muircheartaigh	5	Barry Geraghty	Edward O'Grady
2006	Clopf	5	Barry Geraghty	Edward O'Grady
2007	Quinmaster	5	Ruby Walsh	Michael Halford
2008	Academy Sir Harry	6	Barry Geraghty	Eoin Griffin
2009	Judge Roy Bean	6	Andrew McNamara	Edward O'Grady
2010	Hidden Cyclone	5	Andrew McNamara	John Joseph Hanlon
2011	Il Fenomeno	5	Davy Russell	Noel Meade
2012	Sizing Rio	4	Andrew Lynch	Henry de Bromhead
2013	Minella Foru	4	Tony McCoy	Edward P Harty
2014	McKinley	4	Bryan Cooper	Willie Mullins
2015	Three Stars	5	Johnny Burke	Henry de Bromhead
2016	Labaik	5	Ruby Walsh	Gordon Elliott
2017	Mengli Khan	4	Jack Kennedy	Gordon Elliott
2018	Aramon	5	Paul Townend	Willie Mullins
2019	Abacadabras	5	Robbie Power	Gordon Elliott
2020	N’golo	5	Paul Townend	Willie Mullins
2021	My Mate Mozzie	5	Mark Walsh	Gavin Cromwell
2022	Hercule Du Seuil	5	Mark Walsh	Willie Mullins
2023	What's Up Darling	6	Sam Ewing	Gordon Elliott
2024	Bleu De Vassy	5	Jack Kennedy	Gordon Elliott
2025	I'll Sort That	5	Declan Queally	Declan Queally
2026	Thinkitdontjinxit	5	Jack Kennedy	Gordon Elliott

== See also ==
- Horse racing in Ireland
- List of Irish National Hunt races
