= Nas Na Riogh Novice Chase =

National Hunt horse race in Ireland

Nas Na Riogh Novice Chase
2025
Prince Palace	Shantreusse	Global Export

Previous years
2024
Battle It Out	Shantreusse	Evies Vladimir
2023
Limerick Lace	Jody Ted	The Little Yank
2022
Gabbys Cross	Ballyshannon Rose	King Alex
2021
Home By The Lee	Enjoy D'allen	Ministerforsport

2020-2011
2020
Castle Oliver	Countess Cathleen	Valdieu
2019
Poker Party	Monatomic	Stowaway Forever
2018
Fitzhenry	Last Encounter	Coeur Joyeux
2017
Edwulf	Space Cadet	Velocity Boy
2016
Marlbrook	Vicangelome	Captain Von Trappe
2015
Empire Of Dirt	Champagne James	Asitsohappens
2014
Mozoltov	Folsom Blue	Summer Star
2013
Sweeney Tunes	Charlie's Vic	Mikael D'Haguenet
2012
Rathlin	Shot From The Hip	Gates Of Rome
2011
Roi Du Mee	Ad Idem	Alpha Ridge

2010-2001
2010
Kempes	Jagoes Mills	Taravada
2009
Joncol	Good Fella	Leanne
2008
Thyne Again	Casey Jones	J'y Vole
2007
Benefit Night	Letterman	Baron De Feypo
2006
Lordofourown	Chetwind Music	Kill Devil Hill
2005
Well Presented	Healy's Pub	Coast To Coast
2004
Jim	Boneyarrow	Stashedaway
2003
Glens Music	Eskimo Jack	I'vehadit
2002
Colonel Braxton	Youlneverwalkalone	Copernicus
2001
Sackville	River Clodagh	Rose Of Inchiquin

2000-1991
2000
Alexander Banquet	Go Roger Go	Saxophone
1999
Rince Ri	Manus The Man	Rocketts Castle
1998
Guest Performance	Glebe Lad	The Quads
1997
Corket	Le Ginno	Maid For Dancing
1996
Love The Lord	Back Bar	Common Policy
1995
Imperial Call	The Crazy Bishop	Tryfirion
1994
Glencloud	Fabricator	Its A Cracker
1993
Galevilla Express	Classical Charm	Thats The Life
1992
Second Schedual	Boro Smackeroo	Stigon
1991
El-Sid Senor	Laura's Beau	Garryduff Mover

1990-1988
1990
Kiichi	Isthatafact	Derrymore Boy
1989
Lucky Baloo	Ruby Lodge	Tonycharlie
1988
Golden Freeze	Sergeant Sprite	Olan Lad

The Nas Na Riogh Novice Chase is a Grade B National Hunt novice handicap chase in Ireland. It is run at Naas in February, over a distance of 2 miles and 4 furlongs and during the race there are 13 fences to be jumped.

The race was first run in 1981 as a Listed race restricted to novices, and was initially known as the Nas Na Ri Chase. The race was renamed in 1996, and was upgraded to Grade 2 status in 2003.

In 2015 the race was downgraded to a novice handicap.

Nas Na Ri/Nás na Ríogh is the Irish name for the town of Naas.

== Records ==
Most successful jockey (4 wins):

- Davy Russell- Thyne Again (2008), Roi Du Mee (2011), Rathlin (2012), Sweeney Tunes (2013)

Most successful trainer (3 wins):

- Willie Mullins– Alexander Banquet (2000), Kempes (2010), Mozoltov (2014)
- Paul Nolan - Joncol (2009), Sweeney Tunes (2013), Fitzhenry (2018)

== Winners ==
- Amateur jockeys indicated by "Mr".

Year	Winner	Age	Jockey	Trainer
1981	King's Servant	7	P Woods	P Connell
1982	Prominent Artist	7	J Maxwell	J P Byrne
1983	Twinburn	8	A Redmond	Frank Berry
1984	Born To Shine	9	Tommy Kinane	Tommy Kinane Jr
1985	Bit of the Action	8	E O'Grady	T J Ryan
1986	Boro Quarter	7	P Mullins	P Gill
1987	Trimar Gold	7	A Keane	Mr T Doyle
1988	Golden Freeze	6	Brendan Sheridan	Mrs R Walsh
1989	Lucky Baloo	7	Charlie Swan	Capt Donald Swan
1990	Kiichi	5	Brendan Sheridan	Dermot Weld
1991	El-Sid Senor	8	F J Flood	Francis Flood
1992	Second Schedual	7	Charlie Swan	A L T Moore
1993	Galevilla Express	6	C N Bowens	V Bowens
1994	Glencloud	6	G M O'Neill	Noel Meade
1995	Imperial Call	6	G M O'Neill	Fergie Sutherland
1996	Love The Lord	6	K F O'Brien	Daniel O'Connell
1997	Corket	7	T Horgan	Aidan O'Brien
1998	Guest Performance	6	Garrett Cotter	Dessie Hughes
1999	Rince Ri	6	Ruby Walsh	Ted Walsh
2000	Alexander Banquet	7	Jason Titley	Willie Mullins
2001	Sackville	8	David Casey	Frances Crowley
2002	Colonel Braxton	7	Norman Williamson	Dessie Hughes
2003	Glens Music	10	T P Treacy	J A O'Connell
2004	Jim	7	Barry Geraghty	Jim Dreaper
2005	Well Presented	7	Robbie Power	Jessica Harrington
2006	Lordofourown	8	Andrew McNamara	S Donohoe
2007	Benefit Night	7	Barry Cash	Rusty M Richards
2008	Thyne Again	7	Davy Russell	W J Burke
2009	Joncol	6	P W Flood	Paul Nolan
2010	Kempes (Note: The 2010 race took place at Thurles after the original race at Naas was abandoned)	7	Ruby Walsh	Willie Mullins
2011	Roi Du Mee	6	Davy Russell	Gordon Elliott
2012	Rathlin	7	Davy Russell	Mouse Morris
2013	Sweeney Tunes	7	Davy Russell	Paul Nolan
2014	Mozoltov	8	Bryan Cooper	Willie Mullins
2015	Empire Of Dirt	8	Luke Dempsey	Colm Murphy
2016	Marlbrook	8	Barry Geraghty	Colm Murphy
2017	Edwulf	8	Robbie Power	Joseph O'Brien
2018	Fitzhenry	6	Barry Geraghty	Paul Nolan
2019	Poker Party	7	Rachael Blackmore	Henry de Bromhead
2020	Castle Oliver	6	Mark Walsh	Padraig Roche
2021	Home By The Lee	6	JJ Slevin	Joseph O'Brien
2022	Gabbys Cross	7	Rachael Blackmore	Henry de Bromhead
2023	Limerick Lace	6	Aidan Kelly	Gavin Cromwell
2024	Battle It Out	6	Charlie O'Dwyer	Conor O'Dwyer
2025	Prince Palace	7	Harry Sexton	Pat Fahy
2026	Goraibhmaithagat	6	Mark Walsh	Colm Murphy

== See also ==
- List of Irish National Hunt races
