= Imperial Call Chase =

Steeplechase horse race in Ireland

Imperial Call Chase
2026
| Nowwhatdoyouthink | Broomfield Bijou | Classic Getaway |

Previous years
2025
Mister Policeman | Fil Dor | Hascoeur Clermont
2024
Asterion Forlonge | Lucid Dreams | Only two ran
2023
Bachasson | Feronily | Chacun Pour Soi
2022
Melon | Doctor Duffy | Minella Times
2021
Waitnsee | Spyglass Hill | Go Another One

2020-2011
2019
Timeforwest | Killultagh Vic | Ball D'Arc
2018
Sumos Novios | Mala Beach | Val De Ferbet
2017
Val De Ferbet | A Toi Phil | Winter Magic
2016
Fine Rightly | Toon River | Arctic Skipper
2015
On His Own | Roi Du Mee | Letter Of Credit
2014
Toner D'Oudairies | Noble Prince | Caim Hill
2013
Roi Du Mee | Pandorama | Toon River
2012
Wellforth | Saddler's Native | Duroob
2011
Roberto Goldback | Swift Counsel | Let Yourself Go

2010-2000
2010
Florida Express | Tinakellylad | Follow The Plan
2009
Badgerlaw | Gripit N Tipit | Dante Hall
2008
In The High Grass | He's On His Way | Tawnies
2007
Our Ben | Lady Kate Ellen | Romek
2006
Slim Pickings | Sher Beau | Augherskea
2005
G V A Ireland | Joueur D'Estruval | Colonel Monroe
2004
Joueur D'Estruval | Dromlease Express | Where Now
2003
Kadoun | Garvivonnian | Goldenhalo
2002
Golden Storm | Risk Accessor | Come In Moscow
2001
Ceoil Agus Craic | Arctic Copper | The Dell
2000
Lyreen Wonder | Cockney Lad | Right'N'Royal

The Imperial Call Chase (Now Bar One Racing Chase) is a Grade 3 National Hunt steeplechase in Ireland which is open to horses aged five years or older. It is run at Cork over a distance of 3 miles (4,828 metres), and is scheduled to take place each year in late March or early April. The race is named in honour of Imperial Call, the winner of the Hennessy Gold Cup and Cheltenham Gold Cup in 1996, who was trained in County Cork.

The race was first run in 2000, and was awarded Grade 3 status in 2012. The 2017 running was named the Dr Vincent O'Brien Centenary Chase to commemorate the centenary of the birth of Vincent O'Brien in April 1917. O'Brien came from Churchtown, County Cork and was president of Cork Racecourse from 1997 to his death in 1997. Since 2019 the race has been run under sponsored titles.

== Records ==
Most successful jockey (2 wins):

- Barry Cash – Lyreen Wonder (2000), Wellforth (2012)
- Barry Geraghty– Joueur D'Estruval (2004), Slim Pickings (2006)
- Robbie Power – G V A Ireland (2005), Roberto Goldback (2011)

Most successful trainer (7 wins):

- Willie Mullins – Joueur D'Estruval (2004), Our Ben (2007), On His Own (2015), Melon (2022), Bachasson (2023), Asterion Forlonge (2024), Mister Policeman (2025)

== Winners ==
| Year | Winner | Age | Jockey | Trainer |
|---|---|---|---|---|
| 2000 | Lyreen Wonder | 7 | Barry Cash | Arthur Moore |
| 2001 | Ceoil Agus Craic | 10 | John Cullen | Michael G Holden |
| 2002 | Golden Storm | 5 | Sean McDermott | Ms Frances Crowley |
| 2003 | Kadoun | 6 | Mr Denis Cullen | Michael O'Brien |
| 2004 | Joueur D'Estruval | 7 | Barry Geraghty | Willie Mullins |
| 2005 | G V A Ireland | 7 | Robbie Power | Francis Flood |
| 2006 | Slim Pickings | 7 | Barry Geraghty | Robert Tyner |
| 2007 | Our Ben | 8 | Ruby Walsh | Willie Mullins |
| 2008 | In The High Grass | 7 | Adrian Joyce | Tom Taaffe |
| 2009 | Badgerlaw | 9 | Andrew Leigh | Jessica Harrington |
| 2010 | Florida Express | 10 | S W Jackson | Philip Redmond |
| 2011 | Roberto Goldback | 9 | Robbie Power | Jessica Harrington |
| 2012 | Wellforth | 8 | Barry Cash | Paul John Gilligan |
| 2013 | Roi Du Mee | 8 | Jason Maguire | Gordon Elliott |
| 2014 | Toner D'Oudairies | 7 | Davy Condon | Gordon Elliott |
| 2015 | On His Own | 11 | David Casey | Willie Mullins |
| 2016 | Fine Rightly | 8 | Andrew Lynch | Stuart Crawford |
| 2017 | Val De Ferbet | 8 | Adrian Heskin | Andrew McNamara |
| 2018 | Sumos Novios | 11 | Jonathan Burke | Liam Burke |
| 2019 | Timeforwest | 7 | Donagh Meyler | Peter Fahey |
| | no race 2020 (Note: The 2020 running was cancelled because of the COVID-19 pandemic in the Republic of Ireland) |
| 2021 | Waitnsee | 7 | Kevin Brouder | John Patrick Ryan |
| 2022 | Melon | 10 | Bryan Cooper | Willie Mullins |
| 2023 | Bachasson | 12 | Sean Flanagan | Willie Mullins |
| 2024 | Asterion Forlonge | 10 | Sean O'Keeffe | Willie Mullins |
| 2025 | Mister Policeman | 7 | JJ Slevin | Willie Mullins |
| 2026 | Nowwhatdoyouthink | 7 | Liam Quinlan | Ray Hackett |

== See also ==
- List of Irish National Hunt races
