= Clonmel Oil Chase =

Steeplechase horse race in Ireland

- Class: Grade 2
- Location: Clonmel; County Tipperary, Ireland
- Race type: Steeplechase
- Sponsor: Clonmel Oil
- Website: www.clonmelraces.ie

Race information
- Distance: 2m 4f 51y (4,070 metres)
- Surface: Turf
- Track: Right-handed
- Qualification: Four-years-old and up
- Weight: 10 st 10 lb (4yo); 11 st 5 lb (5yo+); Allowances; 7 lb for mares Penalties; 7 lb for a G1 steeplechase win 5 lb for a G2 or two G3 chase wins 3 lb for 3 chase wins or 1 G3 chase win
- Purse: €50,000 (2020); 1st: €29,500

Clonmel Oil Chase
2026
Kappa Jy Pyke	Herja	Blaze The Way

Previous years
2025
Il Etait Temps	Senecia	Intense Raffles
2024
Saint Sam	Fil Dor	Solness
2023
Allaho	Janidil	Grange Walk
2022
Blue Lord	Tornado Flyer	Darasso
2021
Fakir D'Oudairies	Royal Rendezvous	Easy Game

2020-2011
2020
Bachasson	Cilaos Emery	Snow Falcon
2019
Douvan	Jett	Monalee
2018
Kemboy	Alpha Des Obeaux	A Toi Phil
2017
Alpha Des Obeaux	A Toi Phil	Balko Des Flos
2016
Alelchi Inois	Clarcam	Monksland
2015
Road To Riches	Bright New Dawn	Felix Yonger
2014
Champagne Fever	Alderwood	Realt Mor
2013
Arvika Ligeonniere	Toner D'Oudairies	Texas Jack
2012
Sizing Europe	Magnanimity	Let Yourself Go
2011
Tranquil Sea	Psycho	Tharawaat

2010-2001
2010
Tranquil Sea	Let Yourself Go	Scotsirish
2009
Watson Lake	One Cool Cookie	Conna Castle
2008
Glenfinn Captain	One Cool Cookie	Light On The Broom
2007
Mossbank	Knight Legend	Light On The Broom
2006
Sir Oj	Kill Devil Hill	Sher Beau
2005
War Of Attrition	Rathgar Beau	Alcapone
2004
Rathgar Beau	Cloudy Bays	Alcapone
2003
Edredon Bleu	Arctic Copper	Beef Or Salmon
2002
Beef Or Salmon	Sackville	Cregg House
2001
Moscow Express	Micko's Dream	Ferbet Junior

2000-1992
2000
Dorans Pride	Clash Of The Gales	Slaney Native
1999
Dorans Pride	His Song	Inis Cara
1998
Dorans Pride	Merry People	Mr Jeeves
1997
Dorans Pride	Imperial Call	Merry People
1996
Royal Mountbrowne	Belvederian	Love The Lord
1995
Imperial Call	King Of The Gales	Jassu
1994
Belvederian	Sullane River	Haki Saki
1993
King Of The Gales	Haki Saki	Lady Bar
1992
Fissure Seal	Ebony Jane	Final Tub

The Clonmel Oil Chase is a Grade 2 National Hunt steeplechase in Ireland which is open to horses aged four years or older. It is run at Clonmel over a distance of about 2 miles and 4 furlongs (2 miles 4 furlongs and 51 yards, or 4,070 metres), and it is scheduled to take place each year in November.

The event is named after its sponsor, the Clonmel Oil Company. It was first run in 1992 over 3 miles in December and was initially known as the Morris Oil Chase. It was cut by half a mile in 1994, and at the same time it was moved to November. The race was given Grade 3 status in 1995, and it was promoted to Grade 2 level the following year. It was first run under its present title in 2003.

== Records ==
Most successful horse (4 wins):

- Dorans Pride – 1997, 1998, 1999, 2000

Most successful jockey (8 wins):

- Paul Townend – Champagne Fever (2014), Kemboy (2018), Douvan (2019), Blue Lord (2022), Allaho (2023), Saint Sam (2024), Il Etait Temps (2025), Kappa Jy Pyke (2026)

Most successful trainer (11 wins):

- Willie Mullins - Arvika Ligeonniere (2013), Champagne Fever (2014), Alelchi Inois (2016), Kemboy (2018), Douvan (2019), Bachasson (2020), Blue Lord (2022), Allaho (2023), Saint Sam (2024), Il Etait Temps (2025), Kappa Jy Pyke (2026)

== Winners ==
Year	Winner	Age	Jockey	Trainer
1992	Fissure Seal	6	Charlie Swan	Harry de Bromhead
1993	King of the Gales	6	Charlie Swan	John Kiely
1994	Belvederian	7	Conor O'Dwyer	Mouse Morris
1995	Imperial Call	6	Gerry O'Neill	Fergie Sutherland
1996	Royal Mountbrowne	8	Charlie Swan	Aidan O'Brien
1997	Dorans Pride	8	Richard Dunwoody	Michael Hourigan
1998	Dorans Pride	9	Richard Dunwoody	Michael Hourigan
1999	Dorans Pride	10	Paul Hourigan	Michael Hourigan
2000	Dorans Pride	11	Paul Hourigan	Michael Hourigan
2001	Moscow Express	9	Shay Barry	Frances Crowley
2002	Beef Or Salmon	6	Paul Carberry	Michael Hourigan
2003	Edredon Bleu	11	Jim Culloty	Henrietta Knight
2004	Rathgar Beau	8	Shay Barry	Dusty Sheehy
2005	War of Attrition	6	Conor O'Dwyer	Mouse Morris
2006	Sir Oj	9	Paul Carberry	Noel Meade
2007	Mossbank	7	Davy Russell	Michael Hourigan
2008	Glenfinn Captain	9	Barry Geraghty	Tom Taaffe
2009	Watson Lake	11	Paul Carberry	Noel Meade
2010	Tranquil Sea	8	Andrew McNamara	Edward O'Grady
2011	Tranquil Sea	9	Barry Geraghty	Edward O'Grady
2012	Sizing Europe	10	Andrew Lynch	Henry de Bromhead
2013	Arvika Ligeonniere	8	Ruby Walsh	Willie Mullins
2014	Champagne Fever	7	Paul Townend	Willie Mullins
2015	Road to Riches	8	Bryan Cooper	Noel Meade
2016	Alelchi Inois	8	Ruby Walsh	Willie Mullins
2017	Alpha Des Obeaux	4	Sean Flanagan	Mouse Morris
2018	Kemboy	6	Paul Townend	Willie Mullins
2019	Douvan	9	Paul Townend	Willie Mullins
2020	Bachasson	9	David Mullins	Willie Mullins
2021	Fakir D'oudairies	6	Mark Walsh	Joseph O'Brien
2022	Blue Lord	7	Paul Townend	Willie Mullins
2023	Allaho	9	Paul Townend	Willie Mullins
2024	Saint Sam	7	Paul Townend	Willie Mullins
2025	Il Etait Temps	7	Paul Townend	Willie Mullins
2026	Kappa Jy Pyke	6	Paul Townend	Willie Mullins

== See also ==
- Horse racing in Ireland
- List of Irish National Hunt races
