= Hilly Way Chase =

Steeplechase horse race in Ireland

Hilly Way Chase
2025
Found A Fifty	Majborough	Energumene

Previous years
2024
Energumene	Dinoblue	Appreciate It
2023
El Fabiolo	Fil Dor	Maskada
2022
Energumene	Epson Du Houx	Born By The Sea
2021
Energumene	Daly Tiger	Sizing Pottsie

2020-2011
2020
Chacun Pour Soi	Darasso	Only two finished
2019
Cilaos Emery	Ballyoisin	Only two finished
2018
Castlegrace Paddy	Doctor Phoenix	Special Tiara
2017
Un De Sceaux	Top Gamble	Alisier D'irlande
2016
Douvan	Days Hotel	Fine Rightly
2015
Felix Yonger	Bright New Dawn	Hidden Cyclone
2014
Felix Yonger	Mallowney	Days Hotel
2013
Twinlight	Lead Kindly Light	Days Hotel
2012
Days Hotel	Realt Dubh	Blazing Tempo
2011
Golden Silver	Hughies Grey	Becauseicouldntsee

2010-2001
2010
Golden Silver	Zaarito	Kempes
2009
Golden Silver	Watson Lake	Blueberry Boy
2008
Scotsirish	Cailin Alainn	Tumbling Dice
2007
Our Ben	Hi Cloy	Foreman
2006
Tumbling Dice	Jim	Steel Band
2005
Central House	Rathgar Beau	Mariah Rollins
2004
Rathgar Beau	Central House	Mistletoeandwine
2003
Beef Or Salmon	Rathgar Beau	Knife Edge
2002
Beef Or Salmon	River Clodagh	Fadoudal Du Cochet
2001
Knife Edge	Moscow Express	Space Trucker

The Hilly Way Chase is a Grade 2 National Hunt steeplechase in Ireland. It is run at Cork Racecourse in December, over a distance of about 2 miles and half a furlong (2 miles and 160 yards, or 3,365 metres).

The race was first run in 2001 as a Grade 3 race, before being awarded Grade 2 status in 2003. It is currently sponsored by the Bar One Betting.

== Records ==
Most successful horse (3 wins)

- Golden Silver (2009, 2010, 2011)
- Energumene (2021, 2022, 2024)

Leading jockey (9 wins):

- Paul Townend – Golden Silver (2009, 2010), Twinlight (2013), Douvan (2016), Castlegrace Paddy (2018), Chacun Pour Soi (2020), Energumene (2022,2024), El Fabiolo (2023)

Leading trainer (16 wins):

- Willie Mullins - Our Ben (2007), Scotsirish (2008), Golden Silver (2009, 2010, 2011), Twinlight (2013), Felix Yonger (2014, 2015), Douvan (2016), Un De Sceaux (2017), Cilaos Emery (2019), Chacun Pour Soi (2020), Energumene (2021,2022,2024), El Fabiolo (2023)

== Winners ==
Year	Winner	Jockey	Trainer
2001	Knife Edge	Tom Rudd	Michael O'Brien
2002	Beef Or Salmon	Timmy Murphy	Michael Hourigan
2003	Beef Or Salmon	Timmy Murphy	Michael Hourigan
2004	Rathgar Beau	Shay Barry	Dusty Sheehy
2005	Central House	Roger Loughran (Note: amateur jockey)	Dessie Hughes
2006	Tumbling Dice	Shane McGovern	Tom Taaffe
2007	Our Ben	David Casey	Willie Mullins
2008	Scotsirish	Ruby Walsh	Willie Mullins
2009	Golden Silver	Paul Townend	Willie Mullins
2010	Golden Silver (Note: The 2010 running took place at Fairyhouse over a distance of 2m 1f, after the original race at Cork was abandoned because the chase course was frozen)	Paul Townend	Willie Mullins
2011	Golden Silver	Emmet Mullins	Willie Mullins
2012	Days Hotel	Phillip Enright	Henry de Bromhead
2013	Twinlight	Paul Townend	Willie Mullins
2014	Felix Yonger	Danny Mullins	Willie Mullins
2015	Felix Yonger (Note: The 2015 running took place at Navan over a distance of 2m 1f, after the original race at Cork was abandoned)	Ruby Walsh	Willie Mullins
2016	Douvan	Paul Townend	Willie Mullins
2017	Un de Sceaux	David Mullins	Willie Mullins
2018	Castlegrace Paddy	Paul Townend	Pat Fahy
2019	Cilaos Emery	Danny Mullins	Willie Mullins
2020	Chacun Pour Soi	Paul Townend	Willie Mullins
2021	Energumene	Sean O'Keeffe	Willie Mullins
2022	Energumene	Paul Townend	Willie Mullins
2023	El Fabiolo	Paul Townend	Willie Mullins
2024	Energumene	Paul Townend	Willie Mullins
2025	Found A Fifty	Jack Kennedy	Gordon Elliot

== See also ==
- Horse racing in Ireland
- List of Irish National Hunt races
