= Imperial Call =

Irish-bred Thoroughbred racehorse

- Racing silks of Lisselan Farms
- Sire: Callernish
- Grandsire: Lord Gayle
- Dam: Princess Menelek
- Damsire: Menelek
- Sex: Gelding
- Foaled: 21 February 1989
- Country: Ireland
- Colour: Brown
- Breeder: T. A. O'Donnell
- Owner: Lisselan Farms
- Trainer: Fergus Sutherland; Raymond Hurley; Augustine Leahy
- Record: 32: 16-4-5
- Earnings: £414,663

Major wins
- Nas Na Riogh Novice Chase (1995); Morris Oil Chase (1995); Hennessy Gold Cup (1996); Cheltenham Gold Cup (1996); Ericsson Chase (1997); Munster National (1998); John Durkan Memorial Punchestown Chase (1998); Punchestown Gold Cup (1999)

Honours
- Imperial Call Chase at Cork Racecourse

Imperial Call (21 February 1989 – 29 November 2014) was an Irish racehorse. He was a specialist steeplechaser who ran thirty-two times and won sixteen races under National Hunt rules. After showing promise as a hurdler and novice chaser, Imperial Call emerged as a top-class jumper with a win in the Hennessy Gold Cup in February 1996. A month later, he became the first Irish-trained horse for ten years to win Britain's most prestigious steeplechase, the Cheltenham Gold Cup. His subsequent career was disrupted by injury problems but he won further major races including the Punchestown Chase in 1998 and the Punchestown Gold Cup in 1999. Unlike most modern racehorses, Imperial Call was not a Thoroughbred.

== Background ==
Imperial Call was a "leggy, sparely made" brown horse bred in County Wexford, Ireland by T. A. O'Donnell. He was sired by the successful National Hunt stallion Callernish out of the mare Princess Menelek. As Princess Menelek's great-grandmother Friend Galee was of unknown parentage, neither she nor any of her offspring were Thoroughbreds.

As a three-year-old gelding, Imperial Call was consigned by the Redpender Stud to the Tattersalls sales in June 1992, where he was sold for a cash bid of 6,000 guineas. A year later, Imperial Call was sold by the bloodstock dealer Tom Costello to Lisselan Farms Ltd and was sent into training with Fergie Sutherland at his stables at Killinaridish, County Cork. Sutherland was a sixty-year-old Scot who had lost a leg in the Korean War. He had trained winners at Royal Ascot in the 1950s before moving to his family estate in Ireland to train jumpers. Imperial Call was ridden in most of his early races by Gerry O'Neill.

== Racing career ==
=== 1993–1995: early career ===
Imperial Call began his racing career as a four-year-old in 1993. After finishing seventh on his debut, he recorded his first win by taking a Novice Hurdle race at Limerick by fifteen lengths.

After the summer break, Imperial Call competed against experienced hurdlers in the 1993/1994 season. He ran five times, winning races at Limerick, Gowran Park, and Leopardstown Racecourse. In January, he finished second by a short head in a handicap race at Naas Racecourse in which he carried ten pounds more than the winner, Dorans Pride.

In the 1994/1995 season, Imperial Call tackled larger obstacles as he competed in steeplechases. He won three more races, including the Grade III Nas Na Riogh Novice Chase at Naas. Sutherland chose not to send Imperial Call to the 1995 Cheltenham Festival as he felt that the horse needed more time to develop. On his final appearance of the year, he contested the Grade I Power Gold Cup at Fairyhouse Racecourse. Racing against some of the leading Irish novice chasers, he finished third of the nine runners behind Strong Platinum and Sound Man.

=== 1995–1997: Gold Cup years ===
Imperial Call began the 1995/1996 at Clonmel in November. He took the lead two fences from the finish of the Grade III Morris Oil Chase and drew clear of the opposition to win easily. His challenge for the Grade I Punchestown Chase later in the month was short-lived as he fell at the first fence. In January, carrying 156 pounds, he won a handicap at Leopardstown, beating Strong Platinum, who was carrying twelve pounds more. Imperial Call's third attempt at Grade I level came in the Hennessy Cognac Gold Cup in February, a race for which the British-trained Cheltenham Gold Cup winner Master Oats was made favourite. Ridden for the first time by Conor O'Dwyer, Imperial Call led from the start and recovered from a bad mistake at the last fence to win by six lengths from the British champion.

At Cheltenham Racecourse on 14 March, Imperial Call started 9/2 second favourite for the Gold Cup in a field of ten runners. The Northern-trained grey One Man was made 11/8 favourite despite concerns that he would be ineffective over the distance of three and a quarter miles. O'Dwyer restrained the Irish gelding in the early stages before moving up to join the leaders on the second circuit. He took the lead four fences from the finish and turned into the straight with One Man challenging on the outside. The grey soon weakened and dropped away as Imperial Call stayed on strongly to win by four lengths from the future Grand National winner Rough Quest. Couldn't Be Better was nineteen lengths further back in third, whilst One Man finish a tired sixth. The win was the first for an Irish horse since Dawn Run in 1986 and provoked scenes of wild celebration, with the crowd waving flags and singing the Cork anthem The Banks Of My Own Lovely Lee. O'Dwyer waved an Irish Tricolour as he rode the horse to the winner's enclosure where he was tossed into the air by wellwishers. When asked for his comments, Sutherland at first struggled for words but then said: "He put them in their place didn't he. I've thought this horse could win a Gold Cup since he was five and he has improved every day this year."

The 1996/1997 season proved a major disappointment for Imperial Call's supporters. On his seasonal debut, he fell at the last fence of the Punchestown Chase in December, although he was not hurt and was remounted to finish a remote fourth to Royal Mountbrowne. In February, he was beaten more than twenty lengths when third to Danoli in the Hennessy Gold Cup. He was made 4/1 favourite for the Cheltenham Gold Cup after reportedly delighting Sutherland in a training gallop at Tralee. He was never in contention, made a bad mistake at the eighteenth fence, and was tailed off when O'Dwyer pulled him up before the next obstacle.

=== 1997–1999: later career ===
The early part of the 1997/1998 season saw improved form from Imperial Call. After finishing second in his first two races, he easily defeated Merry Gale in the Ericsson Chase at Leopardstown in December to record his first win in 21 months. According to The Independent, the gelding jumped impeccably and was strongly fancied for a repeat win at Cheltenham in March. His season ended in February, however, when he was virtually pulled up and finished lame behind Dorans Pride in the Hennessy Gold Cup.

Fergus Sutherland retired in 1998, and the training of Imperial Call was taken over by the twenty-three-year-old Raymond Hurley. Shortly afterwards, it was reported that Imperial Call would be auctioned at Doncaster in July, but he was subsequently withdrawn from the sale.

On 18 October Imperial Call returned in the Munster National Handicap Chase. He carried top weight of 168 pounds and won easily despite conceding at least twenty-six pounds to his opponents. He was beaten when odds-on favourite for the Cork Grand National, but then defeated the leading racemare Opera Hat (winner of the Melling Chase) at Naas, winning by fifteen lengths. In December, he won the Punchestown Chase at his third attempt, leading from the start and jumping "quickly and accurately" to beat Dorans Pride for the first time in four meetings. At the end of the year, he was sent to England to contest the King George VI Chase at Kempton Park, but after disputing the lead for much of the way he tired badly in the closing stages and finished a distant third of four finishers behind Teeton Mill and Escartefigue. Imperial Call missed the Cheltenham Festival but returned in April for the inaugural running of the Punchestown Gold Cup. Ridden by Ruby Walsh, he started at odds of 8/1 in a five horse field against Florida Pearl, Dorans Pride, Opera Hat and Escartefigue. Imperial Call led from the start and recorded his biggest win in three years as he finished fourteen lengths clear of Florida Pearl. The Irish Independent described Imperial Call's victory as a "majestic display". whilst the Racing Post reported that the winner was given a rapturous reception form the large crowd after one of the best ever performances.

On his first start of the 1999/2000 season, Imperial Call started favourite for the Powers Gold Label Champion Chase at Gowran Park in October. He was never travelling well and finished the race lame in his right foreleg. He remained in training until 2001 but never recovered fitness and did not race again.

== Retirement ==
Imperial Call spent his retirement in West Cork and was reportedly still living there in 2009. He died at the age of twenty-five in late November 2014.

== Assessment and honours ==
In their book A Century of Champions, based on the Timeform rating system, John Randall and Tony Morris rated Imperial Call a "superior" Gold Cup winner and the twenty-fourth best steeplechaser of the 20th century.

On the horse's death in 2014, O'Dwyer said "His strengths were he had no weakness. He jumped, travelled, had speed and had guts to burn. He was very straightforward mentally and you could make the running or hold him up. There was no hole in him, only he might not have been the most sound and Fergie did a great job with him".

The Imperial Call Chase is run at Cork Racecourse in honour of the local champion.

== Pedigree ==
Pedigree of Imperial Call (IRE), brown gelding, 1989
Sire Callernish (IRE) 1977	Lord Gayle; 1965	Sir Gaylord	Turn-To
Sire Callernish (IRE) 1977	Lord Gayle; 1965	Sir Gaylord	Somethingroyal
Sire Callernish (IRE) 1977	Lord Gayle; 1965	Sticky Case	Court Martial
Sire Callernish (IRE) 1977	Lord Gayle; 1965	Sticky Case	Run Honey
Sire Callernish (IRE) 1977	Azurine; 1957	Chamossaire	Precipitation
Sire Callernish (IRE) 1977	Azurine; 1957	Chamossaire	Snowberry
Sire Callernish (IRE) 1977	Azurine; 1957	Blue Dun	Blue Train
Sire Callernish (IRE) 1977	Azurine; 1957	Blue Dun	Dunure
Dam Princess Menelek (GB) 1977	Menelek; 1957	Tulyar	Tehran
Dam Princess Menelek (GB) 1977	Menelek; 1957	Tulyar	Neocracy
Dam Princess Menelek (GB) 1977	Menelek; 1957	Queen of Sheba	Persian Gulf
Dam Princess Menelek (GB) 1977	Menelek; 1957	Queen of Sheba	Ojala
Dam Princess Menelek (GB) 1977	Arctic Sue; 1967	Arctic Slave	Arctic Star
Dam Princess Menelek (GB) 1977	Arctic Sue; 1967	Arctic Slave	Roman Galley
Dam Princess Menelek (GB) 1977	Arctic Sue; 1967	Corrangloss	Iceberg
Dam Princess Menelek (GB) 1977	Arctic Sue; 1967	Corrangloss	Friend Galee (non-thoroughbred)
