= Flyingbolt Novice Chase =

Steeplechase horse race in Ireland

Flyingbolt Novice Chase
2026
Jacob's Ladder	Lovely Hurling	Port Joulain

Previous years
2025
Champ Kiely	Jeannot Lapin	Your Honor
2024
Blood Destiny	Spillane's Tower	Flanking Maneuver
2023
Indiana Jones	Ha D'Or	Flame Bearer
2022
Gentleman De Mee	Grange Walk	Streets Of Doyen
2021
Scarlet And Dove	Sempo	I'm A Game Changer

2020-2011
2020
Sizing Pottsie	Cut The Mustard	Ten Ten
2019
Jetz	Benruben	Duca De Thaix
2017
Ball D'arc	Tully East	Only two finished
2016
Sambremont	Ttebbob	Only two finished
2015
Rawnaq	Gilgamboa	Dromnea
2014
Bright New Dawn	Mallowney	Shrapnel
2013
Buckers Bridge	Twinlight	Cootamundra
2012
Donnas Palm	Foildubh	Carloswayback
2011
Saludos	Montan	Torphichen

2010-2003
2010
Shakervilz	Major Finnegan	Osana
2009
Made In Taipan	Hotel Hilamar	Northern Alliance
2008
Maralan	Dark Artist	Scotsirish
2007
Young Desperado	King Johns Castle	Justpourit
2006
Mansony	Zum See	Logical Approach
2005
Watson Lake	Ulaan Baatar	Steel Band
2004
True Blue Victory	Jim	Munster
2003
Schwartzhalle	Rathgar Beau	Stage Affair

The Flyingbolt Novice Chase is Grade 3 National Hunt steeplechase in Ireland. It is run at Navan Racecourse in March, over a distance of 2 miles and 1 furlong and during the race there are 12 fences to be jumped. The race was first run in 2003 and was downgraded from Grade 2 to Grade 3 in 2017.

== Records ==
Most successful jockey (4 wins):

- Ruby Walsh - True Blue Victory (2004), Young Desperado (2007), Shakervilz (2010), Sambremont (2016)

Most successful trainer (5 wins):

- Willie Mullins - Shakervilz (2010), Sambremont (2016), Gentleman De Mee (2022), Blood Destiny (2024), Champ Kiely (2025)

== Winners ==
Year	Winner	Jockey	Trainer
2003	Schwartzhalle	Michael Mooney	David Harvey
2004	True Blue Victory	Ruby Walsh	Ted Walsh
2005	Watson Lake	Paul Carberry	Noel Meade
2006	Mansony	Conor O'Dwyer	Arthur Moore
2007	Young Desperado	Ruby Walsh	Robert Tyner
2008	Maralan	John Cullen	Patrick O'Brady
2009	Made In Taipan	Davy Russell	Tom Mullins
2010	Shakervilz	Ruby Walsh	Willie Mullins
2011	Saludos	Robbie Power	Jessica Harrington
2012	Donnas Palm	Davy Condon	Noel Meade
2013	Buckers Bridge	Andrew Lynch	Henry de Bromhead
2014	Bright New Dawn	Bryan Cooper	Dessie Hughes
2015	Rawnaq	Andrew Lynch	Matthew Smith
2016	Sambremont	Ruby Walsh	Willie Mullins
2017	Ball D'Arc	Bryan Cooper	Gordon Elliott
	no race 2018
2019	Jetz	Paul Townend	Jessica Harrington
2020	Sizing Pottsie	Robbie Power	Jessica Harrington
2021	Scarlet And Dove	Donagh Meyler	Joseph O'Brien
2022	Gentleman De Mee	Mark Walsh	Willie Mullins
2023	Indiana Jones	Darragh O'Keeffe	Mouse Morris
2024	Blood Destiny	Paul Townend	Willie Mullins
2025	Champ Kiely	Paul Townend	Willie Mullins
2026	Jacob's Ladder	Jack Kennedy	Gordon Elliott

== See also ==
- Horse racing in Ireland
- List of Irish National Hunt races
