= Aintree Hurdle =

Hurdle horse race in Britain

- Class: Grade 1
- Location: Aintree Racecourse; Merseyside, England
- Inaugurated: 1976
- Race type: Hurdle race
- Sponsor: Betway
- Website: Aintree

Race information
- Distance: 2m 4f (4,023 metres)
- Surface: Turf
- Track: Left-handed
- Qualification: Four-years-old and up
- Weight: 11 st 0 lb (4yo); 11 st 7 lb (5yo+); Allowances; 7 lb for fillies and mares
- Purse: £250,000 (2022); 1st: £140,325

Aintree Hurdle
2026
Brighterdaysahead	The New Lion	Alexei

Previous years
2025
Lossiemouth	Wodhooh	Take No Chances
2024
Impaire Et Passe	Bob Olinger	Langer Dan
2023
Constitution Hill	Sharjah	Zanahiyr
2022
Epatante	Monmiral	McFabulous
2021
Abacadabras	Buzz	Millers Bank

2020-2011
2019
Supasundae	Buveur D'Air	Ch'tibello
2018
L'Ami Serge	Supasundae	Clyne
2017
Buveur D'air	My Tent Or Yours	The New One
2016
Annie Power	My Tent Or Yours	Nichols Canyon
2015
Jezki	Rock on Ruby	Volnay De Thaix
2014
The New One	Rock on Ruby	Diakali
2013
Zarkandar	The New One	Thousand Stars
2012
Oscar Whisky	Thousand Stars	Rock on Ruby
2011
Oscar Whisky	Thousand Stars	Salden Licht

2010-2001
2010
Khyber Kim	Muirhead	Zaynar
2009
Solwhit	Fiveforthree	United
2008
Al Eile	Osana	Straw Bear
2007
Al Eile	Gaspara	Afsoun
2006
Asian Maze	Hardy Eustace	Sky's The Limit
2005
Al Eile	Inglis Drever	Exotic Dancer
2004
Rhinestone Cowboy	Rooster Booster	Westender
2003
Sacundai	Rooster Booster	Like-A-Butterfly
2002
Ilnamar	Grimes	It Takes Time
2001
Barton	Best Mate	Mr Cool

2000-1991
2000
Mister Morose	Mantles Prince	Effectual
1999
Istabraq	French Holly	Midnight Legend
1998
Pridwell	Istabraq	Kerawi
1997
Bimsey	Pridwell	Make A Stand
1996
Urubande	Strong Promise	Danoli
1995
Danoli	Boro Eight	Large Action
1994
Danoli	Mole Board	Fortune And Fame
1993
Morley Street	Granville Again	Flown
1992
Morley Street	Minorettes Girl	Forest Sun
1991
Morley Street	Nomadic Way	Run For Free

1990-1988
1990
Morley Street	Joyful Noise	Ikdam
1989
Beech Road	Cloughtaney	Celtic Shot
1988
Celtic Chief	Sabin Du Loir	Cloughtaney

The Aintree Hurdle is a Grade 1 National Hunt hurdle race in Great Britain which is open to horses aged four years or older. It is run at Aintree over a distance of about 2 miles and 4 furlongs (4,023 metres), and during its running there are eleven hurdles to be jumped. The race is scheduled to take place each year in early April.

The event was established in 1976, and it was originally run over 2 miles and 5½ furlongs. It was shortened to its present length in 1988. The race is staged during the three-day Grand National meeting, and was traditionally contested on the final day, Saturday. In 2013 it was moved to the opening day of the meeting, Thursday.

The Aintree Hurdle often features horses which ran previously over a shorter distance in the Champion Hurdle, and the last to win both events in the same year was Constitution Hill in 2023.

The 2010 running was named in memory of Dick Francis (1920–2010), a former jockey who was closely associated with Aintree. He famously rode Devon Loch in the Grand National, and he was leading the race on the run-in when the horse jumped and was overtaken. Since 2017 the race has been sponsored by Betway.

== Records ==
Most successful horse (4 wins):

- Morley Street – 1990, 1991, 1992, 1993

Leading jockey (5 wins):

- Ruby Walsh – Ilnamar (2002), Sacundai (2003), Asian Maze (2006), Zarkandar (2013), Annie Power (2016)

Leading trainer (6 wins):

- Nicky Henderson - Oscar Whisky (2011, 2012), Buveur d'Air (2017), L'Ami Serge (2018), Epatante (2022), Constitution Hill (2023)

== Winners ==
Year	Winner	Age	Jockey	Trainer
1976	Comedy of Errors	9	Ken White	Fred Rimell
1977 (dh)	Night Nurse; Monksfield	6; 5	Paddy Broderick; Dessie Hughes	Peter Easterby; Des McDonogh
1978	Monksfield	6	Dessie Hughes	Des McDonogh
1979	Monksfield	7	Dessie Hughes	Des McDonogh
1980	Pollardstown	5	Philip Blacker	Stan Mellor
1981	Daring Run	6	Ted Walsh (Note: amateur jockey)	Peter McCreery
1982	Daring Run	7	Ted Walsh	Peter McCreery
1983	Gaye Brief	6	Richard Linley	Mercy Rimell
1984	Dawn Run	6	Tony Mullins	Paddy Mullins
1985	Bajan Sunshine	6	Peter Scudamore	Martin Tate
1986	Aonoch	7	Jimmy Duggan	Sally Oliver
1987	Aonoch	8	Jacqui Oliver	Sally Oliver
1988	Celtic Chief	5	Richard Dunwoody	Mercy Rimell
1989	Beech Road	7	Richard Guest	Toby Balding
1990	Morley Street	6	Jimmy Frost	Toby Balding
1991	Morley Street	7	Jimmy Frost	Toby Balding
1992	Morley Street	8	Richard Dunwoody	Toby Balding
1993	Morley Street	9	Graham Bradley	Toby Balding
1994	Danoli	6	Charlie Swan	Tom Foley
1995	Danoli	7	Charlie Swan	Tom Foley
1996	Urubande	6	Charlie Swan	Aidan O'Brien
1997	Bimsey	7	Mick Fitzgerald	Reg Akehurst
1998	Pridwell	8	Tony McCoy	Martin Pipe
1999	Istabraq	7	Charlie Swan	Aidan O'Brien
2000	Mister Morose	10	Carl Llewellyn	Nigel Twiston-Davies
2001	Barton	8	Tony Dobbin	Tim Easterby
2002	Ilnamar	6	Ruby Walsh	Martin Pipe
2003	Sacundai	6	Ruby Walsh	Edward O'Grady
2004	Rhinestone Cowboy	8	J. P. Magnier	Jonjo O'Neill
2005	Al Eile	5	Timmy Murphy	John Queally
2006	Asian Maze	7	Ruby Walsh	Tom Mullins
2007	Al Eile	7	Timmy Murphy	John Queally
2008	Al Eile	8	Timmy Murphy	John Queally
2009	Solwhit	5	Davy Russell	Charles Byrnes
2010	Khyber Kim	8	Paddy Brennan	Nigel Twiston-Davies
2011	Oscar Whisky	6	Barry Geraghty	Nicky Henderson
2012	Oscar Whisky	7	Barry Geraghty	Nicky Henderson
2013	Zarkandar	6	Ruby Walsh	Paul Nicholls
2014	The New One	6	Sam Twiston-Davies	Nigel Twiston-Davies
2015	Jezki	7	Tony McCoy	Jessica Harrington
2016	Annie Power	8	Ruby Walsh	Willie Mullins
2017	Buveur d'Air	6	Barry Geraghty	Nicky Henderson
2018	L'Ami Serge	8	Daryl Jacob	Nicky Henderson
2019	Supasundae	9	Robbie Power	Jessica Harrington
	no race 2020 (Note: The 2020 running was cancelled because of the COVID-19 pandemic in the United Kingdom)
2021	Abacadabras	7	Jack Kennedy	Denise Foster
2022	Epatante	8	Aidan Coleman	Nicky Henderson
2023	Constitution Hill	6	Nico de Boinville	Nicky Henderson
2024	Impaire Et Passe	6	Paul Townend	Willie Mullins
2025	Lossiemouth	6	Paul Townend	Willie Mullins
2026	Brighterdaysahead	7	Jack Kennedy	Gordon Elliott

== See also ==
- Horse racing in Great Britain
- List of British National Hunt races
