= Al Eile =

Irish-bred Thoroughbred racehorse

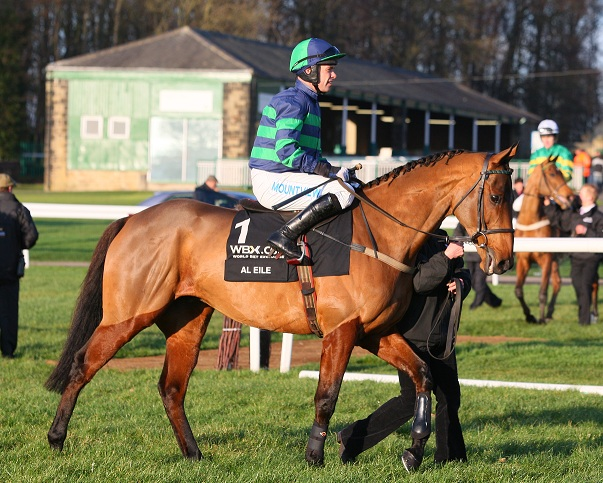
- Al Eile and jockey Timmy Murphy at the 2009 WBX Fighting Fifth Hurdle
- Sire: Alzao
- Grandsire: Lyphard
- Dam: Kilcsem Eile
- Damsire: Commanche Run
- Sex: Gelding
- Foaled: 2000
- Country: Ireland
- Colour: Bay
- Breeder: Michael Ryan
- Owner: Michael Ryan
- Trainer: John Queally
- Record: 45:12-4-6
- Earnings: £598,075

Major wins
- Aintree Hurdle (2005, 2007, 2008); December Festival Hurdle (2007)

Al Eile (foaled on 1 June 2000 in Ireland) is an Irish Thoroughbred racehorse. He is best known for being the only horse to win the Grade I Aintree Hurdle three times.

== Background ==
He was sired by, Alzao out of the mare Kilcsem Eile. He is owned by Michael Ryan and is trained by John Queally. Throughout his time as a racehorse, he has been ridden by several jockeys, including Timmy Murphy and Francis Martin Berry. As of May 2010, Al Eile has amassed a career record of 12 wins, 4 places and 6 shows while accumulating £598,075 in lifetime earnings.

== Racing career ==
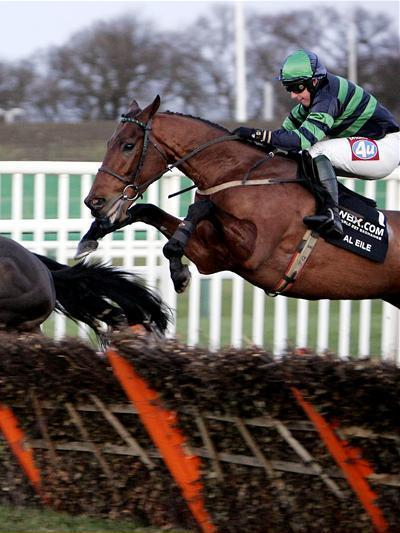
Al Eile and Tony Dobbin

=== Flat Racing ===
Al Eile started racing as a two-year-old in October 2002 when he was entered into the European Breeders Fund Maiden where he finished in 14th place out of 17 entries.

=== 2003/4: Novice Hurdles ===
He won his first race, the Devon Inn 3-Y-O Hurdle, in September 2003 at Listowel Racecourse in Listowel, County Kerry, Ireland. In that race, he beat a field of seven horses in what was his first entry into a jump competition. After the victory, Al Eile went on to win five of his next eight races. Of those wins, the first notable victory was in April 2004 when, as a 25-1 outsider, Al Eile defeated 17 other horses to win the Anniversary 4-Y-O Novices' Hurdle, a Grade 2 National Hunt race.

=== 2005-2009: Senior Hurdle Races ===
In total, Al Eile has won a total of four Grade 1 races, three of which have come in the Aintree Hurdle at Aintree Racecourse in Merseyside, England. In April 2005, Al Eile beat out Inglis Drever by a neck to win his first Aintree Hurdle. In 2007, he defeated Gaspara by 1.5 lengths en route to his second Grade 1 victory. Al Eile followed his win in the 2007 Aintree Hurdle with another in 2008 when he Osana by 10 lengths. The win made Al Eile the first horse to achieve back to back wins in the Aintree Hurdle since Danoli in 1993 and 1994. Al Eile has won one other Grade 1 race in his career, the 2007 December Festival Hurdle at Leopardstown Racecourse in Leopardstown, County Dublin, in which he bested a field of six horses, defeating Hardy Eustace by a single length.
