= 2023 Gold Cup =

2023 Gold Cup may refer to:

- 2023 CONCACAF Gold Cup, international men's association football championship
- 2023 Cheltenham Gold Cup, English horse race
