= Cork Stayers Novice Hurdle =

Hurdle horse race in Ireland

Cork Stayers Novice Hurdle
2025
Good Girl Kathleen	Quantum Quest	Barra Rua

Previous years
2024
Pray Tell	Minella Sixo	Just For Love
2023
Search For Glory	Solitary Man	Sarah Beara
2022
Hiddenvalley Lake	Cool Survivor	Monbeg Park
2021
Nell's Well	Churchstonewarrior	Dedanann

2020-2011
2020
Sayce Gold	Ragnar Lodbrok	Fairyhill Run
2019
Well Set Up	Alpine Cobra	Vis Ta Loi
2018
Derrinross	Sams Profile	Pleasure Dome
2017
Fabulous Saga	Burren Life	Minella Beau
2016
Rathnure Rebel	Monbeg Notorious	Catcheragain
2015
Gangster	Last Encounter	Cogryhill
2014
Black Hercules	Alpha Des Obeaux	Annamatopoeia
2013
The Job Is Right	Band Of Blood	Lots Of Memories
2012
Road To Riches	Dushrembrandt	Beachdale Lad
2011
Corbally Ghost	Best Served Cold	Daring Article

2010-2001
2010
Mossey Joe	Fists Of Fury	Askanna
2009
Quel Esprit	Last Draw	American Job
2008
The Bishop Looney	Part Presenting	Pomme Tiepy
2007
Parsons Pistol	Uncle Junior	Spaceman
2006
Emma Jane	Another Nation	Well Run
2005
Alpha Royale	Mister Top Notch	Justpourit
2004
Homer Wells	Simon	Whizbang
2003
Inexorable	No Small Plans	I Can Imagine
2002
Satco Express	Raven Rock	Colonel Monroe
2001
Barrow Drive	Ira Hayes	Native Sessions

2000-1998
1999
Boley Lad	Native Titan	Sackville
1998
Glazeaway	Kings Banquet	Function Dream

The Cork Stayers Novice Hurdle is a Grade 3 National Hunt novice hurdle in Ireland which is open to horses aged four years or older. The race is run at Cork over a distance of about 3 miles (4,828 metres) and during its running there are 13 hurdles to be jumped. It is scheduled to take place each year in December. It is currently sponsored by the Kerry Group.

The race was first run in 1998 and was awarded Grade 3 status in 2003.

== Records ==
Most successful jockey (2 wins):

- Paul Carberry – Boley Lad (1999), Road To Riches (2012)
- Davy Condon - Homer Wells (2004), Corbally Ghost (2011)
- Paul Townend - Quel Esprit (2009), Black Hercules (2014)

Most successful trainer (5 wins):

- Noel Meade - Boley Lad (1999), Parsons Pistol (2007), Corbally Ghost (2011), Road To Riches (2012), Rathnure Rebel (2016)
- Willie Mullins – Homer Wells (2004), Quel Esprit (2009), Black Hercules (2014), Gangster (2015), Fabulous Saga (2017)

== Winners ==
Year	Winner	Age	Jockey	Trainer
1998	Glazeaway		Ruby Walsh	Michael J O'Connor
1999	Boley Lad	5	Paul Carberry	Noel Meade
2000	no race 2000
2001	Barrow Drive	5	P P O'Brien	Charles Byrnes
2002	Satco Express	6	Timmy Murphy	E Sheehy
2003	Inexorable	5	M D Grant	David Wachman
2004	Homer Wells	6	Davy Condon	Willie Mullins
2005	Alpha Royale	5	Davy Russell	Charles Byrnes
2006	Emma Jane	6	Andrew Lynch	D P Berry
2007	Parsons Pistol	5	Niall Madden	Noel Meade
2008	The Bishop Looney	4	T J Doyle	T J Nagle Jr
2009	Quel Esprit	5	Paul Townend	Willie Mullins
2010	Mossey Joe	7	Andrew Leigh	Willie Austin
2011	Corbally Ghost	4	Davy Condon	Noel Meade
2012	Road To Riches	5	Paul Carberry	Noel Meade
2013	The Job Is Right	5	Adrian Heskin	Michael Hourigan
2014	Black Hercules	5	Paul Townend	Willie Mullins
2015	Gangster	5	Bryan Cooper	Willie Mullins
2016	Rathnure Rebel	6	Sean Flanagan	Noel Meade
2017	Fabulous Saga	5	Danny Mullins	Willie Mullins
2018	Derrinross	7	Luke Dempsey	Philip Dempsey
2019	Well Set Up	6	Ricky Doyle	Mark Fahey
2020	Sayce Gold	7	Darragh O'Keefe	Michael Winters
2021	Nell's Well	7	Mark McDonagh	Sean O'Brien
2022	Hiddenvalley Lake	5	Rachael Blackmore	Henry De Bromhead
2023	Search For Glory	5	Jack Kennedy	Gordon Elliot
2024	Pray Tell	8	John Shinnick	Desmond Kenneally
2025	Good Girl Kathleen	5	Donagh Meyler	Emmet Mullins

== See also ==
- Horse racing in Ireland
- List of Irish National Hunt races
