= 2024 Cheltenham Gold Cup =

Horse race in Britain

- Cheltenham Gold Cup
- Location: Cheltenham Racecourse
- Date: 15 March 2024
- Winning horse: Galopin Des Champs
- Starting price: 10-11 F
- Jockey: Paul Townend
- Trainer: Willie Mullins
- Owner: Mrs Audrey Turley
- Conditions: Soft, heavy in places

The 2024 Cheltenham Gold Cup (known as the Boodles Cheltenham Gold Cup for sponsorship reasons) was the 96th annual running of the Cheltenham Gold Cup horse race and was held at Cheltenham Racecourse, Gloucestershire, England, on 16 March 2024.

The race was won for the second year by the 10-11 favourite Galopin Des Champs, owned by Mrs Audrey Turley, trained in Ireland by Willie Mullins and ridden by Paul Townend. Mullins and Townend were both winning the Cheltenham Gold Cup for a fourth time in six years, after the victories of Al Boum Photo in 2019 and 2020 and Galopin Des Champs in 2023. Gerri Colombe finished second and Corach Rambler was third.

== Race ==
The Real Whacker led the race during the first circuit, with L'Homme Presse close in second and Galopin Des Champs in third. L'Homme Presse moved up to challenge for the lead on the second circuit with Galopin Des Champs remaining close to the leaders. Fastorslow unseated his rider, J. J. Slevin, with seven fences remaining. Gerri Colombe made progress in the field as L'Homme Presse took the lead with three fences left to jump and was left alone in front as the runners turned the final bend. Gerri Colombe and Galopin Des Champs came to challenge and the latter horse took over the lead at the penultimate fence. Gerri Colombe moved into second approaching the last, where Galopin Des Champ's jump confirmed him in a clear lead which he maintained until the finish. Gerri Colombe stayed on up the finishing hill to finish second, with Corach Rambler taking third place ahead of L'Homme Presse.

== Result ==
Source -

	Dist	Horse	Age	Jockey	Trainer ^{†}	SP
1		Galopin Des Champs	8	Paul Townend	Willie Mullins (IRE)	10/11F
2	3½	Gerri Colombe	8	Jack Kennedy	Gordon Elliott (IRE)	13/2
3	9½	Corach Rambler	10	Derek Fox	Lucinda Russell	14/1
4	2¼	L'Homme Presse	9	Charlie Deutsch	Venetia Williams	16/1
5	3½	Bravemansgame	9	Harry Cobden	Paul Nicholls	14/1
6	1¾	Jungle Boogie	10	Rachael Blackmore	Henry de Bromhead (IRE)	16/1
PU		Monkfish	10	Patrick Mullins	Willie Mullins (IRE)	18/1
PU		Gentlemansgame	8	Darragh O'Keeffe	Mouse Morris (IRE)	25/1
PU		Nassalam	7	Niall Houlihan	Gary Moore	33/1
PU		The Real Whacker	8	Sam Twiston-Davies	Patrick Neville	40/1
UR		Fastorslow	8	J. J. Slevin	Martin Brassil (IRE)	8/1

* The distances between the horses are shown in lengths or shorter.
† Trainers are based in Great Britain unless indicated. PU = pulled-up UR = unseated rider.
