= Constitution Hill (horse) =

British-bred hurdling racehorse

- Sire: Blue Bresil
- Grandsire: Smadoun
- Dam: Queen Of The Stage
- Damsire: King's Theatre
- Sex: Gelding
- Foaled: 17 March 2017
- Colour: Bay
- Breeder: Mrs S. A. Noott
- Owner: Michael Buckley
- Trainer: Nicky Henderson
- Record: 17: 12-0-0
- Earnings: £898,465

Major wins
- Tolworth Novices' Hurdle (2022); Supreme Novices' Hurdle (2022); Fighting Fifth Hurdle (2022); Christmas Hurdle (2022, 2023, 2024); Champion Hurdle (2023); Aintree Hurdle (2023); International Hurdle (2025); Timeform rating: 177

Constitution Hill (foaled 17 March 2017) is a British-Thoroughbred racehorse who competed in hurdle racing before switching to Flat Racing as a nine-year-old in 2026. Trained by Nicky Henderson and ridden by Nico de Boinville, he won his first ten starts over hurdles, securing eight Group 1 victories including the 2023 Champion Hurdle at the Cheltenham Festival. His winning streak came to an end when he fell in the 2025 Champion Hurdle. After two more falls and a fifth place, his trainer and owner decided to switch him to the Flat.

== Background ==
Constitution Hill is a bay gelding with a small white star bred by the Worcestershire-based Sally Noott. His sire Blue Bresil won three races on the flat and was also campaigned over hurdles in France. He has sired numerous good National Hunt winners including L'Autonomie (Grande Course de Haies d'Auteuil), Blue Lord (Paddy's Reward Club Chase), Royale Pagaille (Betfair Chase) and Mick Jazz (Ryanair Hurdle). Constitution Hill's dam Queen of the Stage won two minor races over hurdles in the UK. She was a distant female-line descendant of the British broodmare Our Liz.

As a foal in November 2017 he was consigned Tattersalls Ireland November National Hunt Sale and was bought for €16,500 by Warren Ewing and Barry Geraghty.

== Racing career ==
=== Point-to-point racing ===
Constitution Hill was initially trained by Ewing and began his racing career on the amateur point-to-point circuit by finishing second in a maiden race at Tipperary on 24 April 2021, beaten a head by Anyharminasking. The gelding was sent to the Goffs Horses in Training sale a month later and was bought for £120,000 by Nicky Henderson on behalf of Michael Buckley. Henderson trained the horse at Upper Lambourn in Berkshire.

=== 2021/2022 National Hunt season ===
On his first appearance under National Hunt rules, Constitution Hill started the 85/40 second choice in the betting for a nine-runner novice hurdle over two miles on good to soft ground at Sandown Park Racecourse on 4 December 2021. He was ridden by Nico de Boinville, who became his regular jockey, riding him in all but one of his races over hurdles. After settling behind the leaders, he took the lead after jumping the final hurdle and drew away to win by nine lengths in "impressive" fashion. On 8 January 2022, the gelding was stepped up to Grade 1 class for the Tolworth Hurdle over the same distance and went off the 2/5 favourite against five opponents. He went to the front at the penultimate obstacle and steadily increased his advantage to win by twelve lengths from Jetoile. After the race, Henderson commented, "Nico said he knew within ten strides going to the start that the horse would be happy on the [heavy] ground and that he was happy the entire way. He also said he couldn't believe how far clear he was without even having to give the horse a click."

On the opening day of the 2022 Cheltenham Festival, Constitution Hill started the 9/4 joint favourite alongside the Willie Mullins-trained Dysart Dynamo for the Supreme Novices' Hurdle. The other seven contenders included the undefeated Jonbon (also trained by Henderson), Kilcruit (Champion INH Flat Race), and Mighty Potter (Future Champions Novice Hurdle). Constitution Hill raced in third place behind Dysart Dynamo and Jonbon before the Irish gelding fell at the third last. He overtook his stable companion two hurdles from the finish and pulled away from his rivals to win by twenty-two lengths despite being eased down by de Boinville in the closing stages. With this victory, Constitution Hill set the course record time at 3 minutes and 44.43 seconds, beating Annie Power's time in the 2016 Champion Hurdle. This led to the gelding being awarded a timeform rating of 177p - the highest ever recorded by a novice. De Boinville commented, "I knew it was going to be fast and furious and in fairness he did it like a piece of work. I was so happy going to the last. He could be anything, I'm sure he'd jump a fence as well. He's got so much scope."

=== 2022/2023 National Hunt season ===
Constitution Hill began his next campaign in the Grade 1 Fighting Fifth Hurdle at Newcastle Racecourse on 26 November 2022 and started the 1/4 favourite in a five-runner field which included the 2020 Champion Hurdle winner Epatante (trained by Henderson) and Not So Sleepy, who had won the race in 2021. He led from the start and was never in any danger of defeat, opening up a clear advantage three hurdles from the finish and coming home twelve lengths clear of Epatante. After the race, Henderson said, "What we saw last year, it looked pretty freakish. The stats said it was, the times said it was, everything said this is a freak. I was just worried it was going to be a silly tactical race today. I said to Nico, just go and enjoy yourself, you can do anything on this horse, he’s so versatile, his brain is so good... If I pulled out 30 horses and he was in the middle of them, you wouldn’t pick him out in a million years. But he’s so wonderfully geared in his head that you can do whatever you like, make the running, drop him in, it doesn’t matter. He just does it for you.”

A month after his win at Newcastle, Constitution Hill went off the 1/7 favourite for the Christmas Hurdle at Kempton Park Racecourse with Epatante being the only one of his four opponents to start at odds of less than 20/1. He tracked the front-running Highway One O Two before taking the lead four hurdles from the finish. He quickly opened up a clear advantage and won "easily" by seventeen lengths from Epatante. Henderson commented, "Nico said turning in that he was actually dossing and then he pressed the button and off he went. He was having a nice time - he’s quick and fast and accurate and at the moment there’s no chinks in that armour because he’s got such a great mind."

In the Champion Hurdle on 14 March 2023, Constitution Hill started the 4/11 favourite ahead of the Irish gelding State Man, the winner of four consecutive Grade 1 races. The other five contenders were Not So Sleepy, Vauban (Champion Four Year Old Hurdle), I Like To Move It (Kingwell Hurdle), Zanahiyr (Jezki Hurdle), and Jason The Militant (Red Mills Trial Hurdle). Constitution Hill tracked the leaders as I Like To Move It set the pace, then moved up to take the lead three hurdles from the finish. He went clear of the field approaching the final obstacle and won by nine lengths from State Man with a further four lengths back to Zanahiyr in third. After his record ninth win in the race, Henderson said: "You can do anything with this horse. You could jump a fence, you could go three miles. He has had six races now and has barely come off the bridle but it won't last forever so let's enjoy it while we have got it. Sprinter Sacre, did amazing things for us and the emotion behind him was unbelievable. This horse has got into those echelons after six races. It is an extraordinary thing to happen but he is an extraordinary horse. He is a freak." Tony McCoy acclaimed him as the "horse of a generation".

For his final start of the season, Constitution Hill was stepped up in distance at Aintree Racecourse and started the 2/15 favourite for the Aintree Hurdle over two and a half miles. Epatante, Zanahiyr, and I Like To Move It were again in opposition as well as Sharjah, the four-time winner of the Matheson Hurdle and twice runner-up in the Champion Hurdle. Constitution Hill led from the start and was never seriously challenged, winning by three lengths from Sharjah. Henderson said, "That couldn’t have been more straightforward. Two and a half miles out there on your own, your mind could wander but he’s just had a doddle around and was in second gear the whole way."

=== 2023/2024 National Hunt season ===
On 26 December 2023 Constitution Hill attempted to repeat his success in the Christmas Hurdle and started the 1/12 favourite against four opponents headed by the Scottish Champion Hurdle winner Rubaud. He tracked the front-running Rubaud before taking the lead at the second last flight and won "easily" by nine and a half lengths. After the race Henderson said “I’ve not seen one jump better, that’s the great secret to all these good two-milers, and we have been very lucky over the years going way back when with See You Then, and then Binocular, Epatante and Buveur d'Air – it is the way they get from A to B. We had this discussion in the summer to jump fences, but what was there to be gained by doing it... We want to win the Champion Hurdle again."

After a poor performance in a training gallop and an unsatisfactory blood test it was announced that Constitution Hill would not defend his Champion Hurdle title. Henderson announced "Very sadly we are going to have to admit defeat in the battle to get Constitution Hill ready for the Champion Hurdle... it is in everybody's best interests that we have a fit and healthy Constitution Hill to win back his crown next year."

=== 2024/2025 National Hunt Season ===
On 26 December 2024 Constitution Hill returned to the racecourse to win a third Christmas Hurdle after a break of twelve months, during which he had suffered a respiratory tract infection, suspected colic and lameness. Starting as 5/6 favourite in a field of four, he beat Lossiemouth by two and a half lengths. His next race was the Grade 2 International Hurdle at Cheltenham on 25 January. Starting as favourite at odds 1/12, he survived a mistake at the last to win by three lengths from Brentford Boy. The victory took his tally to ten wins from ten starts over hurdles. The eight-year-old then started as odd-on favourite when attempting to regain his title in the Champion Hurdle at the Cheltenham Festival, but fell at the fifth hurdle. It was the first time he had fallen in a race, and was followed by another fall in the Aintree Hurdle.

On 2 May 2025, Constitution Hill ran for the first time in Ireland, contesting the Punchestown Champion Hurdle. He was ridden by James Bowen, as his regular jockey Nico de Boinville was sidelined with injuries. He trailed home in fifth place and was found to have a grazed hind leg after the race. His trainer said: "He was beaten two out and James looked after him. Something has obviously gone wrong because that's not him and our job is to try to unravel the mystery."

=== 2025/2026 National Hunt Season ===
Constitution Hill made his seasonal reappearance on 29 November 2025 in the Fighting Fifth Hurdle at Newcastle, a race he had won on his only previous attempt in 2022. He started as 6/4 favourite and fell at the second hurdle. As he had fallen in three of his last four starts over hurdles, Constitution Hill's owner and trainer decided to switch him to the Flat.

=== Flat racing ===
Date	Distance	Race	Grade	Track	Field	Finish	Winning Time	Winning (Losing) Margin	Winner (2nd Place)	Jockey	Ref
2026 – Nine-year-old season
February 20	1m 4f (2400m)	Road to Cheltenham Novice Stakes	Novice	Southwell	13	1st	2:34.67	9.5 lengths	(Square Necker)	Oisin Murphy	
March 25	1m 4f (2400m)	Virgin Bet Novice Stakes	Novice	Kempton Park	8	1st	2:34.47	2 Lengths	(Classic Allusion)	Ryan Moore	
September 5	1m 3f 219y (2413m)	September Stakes	G3	Kempton Park	5	4th		5.75 Lengths	Pride of Arras	Billy Loughnane	
October 25	1m 4f	Gran Premio del Jockey Club	G2	San Siro	12					Rossa Ryan	
November 25	1m 4f	Floodlit Stakes	Listed	Kempton Park							

== Pedigree ==
Pedigree of Constitution Hill (GB), bay gelding, 2017
Sire Blue Bresil (FR) 2005	Smadoun (FR); 1990	Kaldoun	Caro (IRE)
Sire Blue Bresil (FR) 2005	Smadoun (FR); 1990	Kaldoun	Katana
Sire Blue Bresil (FR) 2005	Smadoun (FR); 1990	Mossma	Tip Moss
Sire Blue Bresil (FR) 2005	Smadoun (FR); 1990	Mossma	Ticma (GB)
Sire Blue Bresil (FR) 2005	Miss Recif (IRE); 1995	Exit To Nowhere (USA)	Irish River (FR)
Sire Blue Bresil (FR) 2005	Miss Recif (IRE); 1995	Exit To Nowhere (USA)	Coup de Folie
Sire Blue Bresil (FR) 2005	Miss Recif (IRE); 1995	Miss Bresil (FR)	Bellypha (IRE)
Sire Blue Bresil (FR) 2005	Miss Recif (IRE); 1995	Miss Bresil (FR)	Lady Eglantine
Dam Queen of the Stage (IRE) 2010	King's Theatre (IRE); 1991	Sadler's Wells (USA)	Northern Dancer (CAN)
Dam Queen of the Stage (IRE) 2010	King's Theatre (IRE); 1991	Sadler's Wells (USA)	Fairy Bridge
Dam Queen of the Stage (IRE) 2010	King's Theatre (IRE); 1991	Regal Beauty (USA)	Princely Native
Dam Queen of the Stage (IRE) 2010	King's Theatre (IRE); 1991	Regal Beauty (USA)	Dennis Belle
Dam Queen of the Stage (IRE) 2010	Supreme du Casse (IRE); 1999	Supreme Leader (GB)	Bustino
Dam Queen of the Stage (IRE) 2010	Supreme du Casse (IRE); 1999	Supreme Leader (GB)	Princess Zena
Dam Queen of the Stage (IRE) 2010	Supreme du Casse (IRE); 1999	Pede Gale	Strong Gale
Dam Queen of the Stage (IRE) 2010	Supreme du Casse (IRE); 1999	Pede Gale	Deep Adventure (Family 4-i)
