= Danoli =

Irish-bred Thoroughbred racehorse

- Sire: The Parson
- Grandsire: Aureole
- Dam: Blaze Gold
- Damsire: Arizona Duke
- Sex: Gelding
- Foaled: 14 May 1988
- Country: Ireland
- Colour: Bay
- Breeder: Francis Austin
- Owner: Dan O'Neill
- Trainer: Tom Foley
- Record: 32:17-3-6
- Earnings: £330,661

Major wins
- Sun Alliance Novices' Hurdle (1994); Aintree Hurdle (1994, 1995); Morgiana Hurdle (1994); Hatton's Grace Hurdle (1994); Red Mills Trial Hurdle (1996); Denny Gold Medal Chase (1996); Hennessy Gold Cup (1997)

Danoli (14 May 1988 – April 2006) was an Irish Thoroughbred racehorse. He was best known for his successes in hurdle races, although he also had success in steeplechases later in his career. Danoli was described as the most popular racehorse in Ireland during the 1990s, and was regarded as "the People's Champion". His successes were achieved despite the fact that his career was frequently disrupted by injury. He was noted for a rivalry with another Irish horse, Dorans Pride.

== Background ==
Danoli was a bay horse with a small white star and a white sock on his rear left foot. He was sired by the successful National Hunt stallion The Parson out of the mare Blaze Gold.

As a three-year-old gelding he was sent to the Goffs sales in June 1991, but failed to attract a buyer. He was subsequently acquired by Dan O'Neill and sent into training with Tom Foley at his stables near Bagenalstown in County Carlow. The horse was named by combining the name of his owner Dan O'Neill with that of his daughter, Olivia Among the jockeys to ride Danoli were Charlie Swan and Tommy Treacey.

== Racing career ==
=== 1992–1993: National Hunt flat races ===
Danoli began his career by running in National Hunt flat races (also known as "bumpers") in the 1992/1993 season. He was unbeaten in three starts, winning two races at Naas and one at Punchestown.

=== 1993–1996: hurdle races ===
In the 1993/1994 season he began to race over hurdles and won his first two starts before he was beaten by Winter Belle at Leopardstown in December. Despite this defeat he was promoted to run against more experienced hurdlers in the Grade I Irish Champion Hurdle at Leopardstown and finished second to the odds-on favourite Fortune and Fame. He was ten lengths clear of the other runners who included the Champion Hurdler Granville Again. Three weeks later at the same course he won the Deloitte and Touche Hurdle by ten lengths and was then sent to England to contest the Grade I Sun Alliance Novices' Hurdle at the Cheltenham Festival. He was a popular choice with the large Irish contingent and was sent off the 7/4 favourite against twenty-two opponents. Ridden by Charlie Swan he took the lead four hurdles from the finish and stayed on to win by two lengths from Corrouge. Describing the reaction of the crowd, George Ennor of the Racing Post wrote that "they cheered him down to the start, they cheered him as he started, they cheered more loudly as he took the lead, and they raised the roof as he passed the post in front." Having defeated the best of the English and Irish novices, Danoli next faced a much stronger field in the Aintree Hurdle a month later. He started 9/2 third favourite behind the newly crowned English champion Flakey Dove and Fortune and Fame. Swan tracked the leader Muse before going into the lead three hurdles from the finish. Danoli went into a clear lead and was never seriously challenged, winning by eight lengths from Mole Board, with Fortune and Fame third and Flakey Dove fifth.

Danoli began the 1994/1995 season by winning the Morgiana Hurdle at odds of 1/5 and then beat Doran's Pride by eight lengths in the Grade I Hatton's Grace Hurdle. For the second year in succession, Danoli's winning run came to an end at Leopardstown's Christmas meeting. In the Grade III Christmas Hurdle he jumped poorly and was struggling two hurdles out before finishing a remote second to Doran's Pride. Danoli did not run again before the Champion Hurdle at Cheltenham on 14 March, for which he started 4/1 joint favourite. He finished third, beaten seven lengths by the top class flat racer Alderbrook, with Large Action in second. On his final run of the season, Danoli returned to England for a second Aintree Hurdle. He was always among the leaders and ran on gamely in the closing stages to win by three quarters of a length from Boro Eight, with Large Action third and Doran's Pride fourth. Danoli returned from the race badly lame, and examinations revealed a fracture of the cannon bone in his right foreleg. He was operated on at the University of Liverpool's Leahurst Veterinary College, and his future as a racehorse was left in the balance.

After a hiatus of more than nine months, Danoli returned with his new regular jockey Tommy Treacy and finished third in the Irish Champion Hurdle. His comeback from injury was received with such enthusiasm by the public and the media that the winner, Collier Bay was virtually ignored. He attracted a record crowd to Gowran Park in February for the Red Mills Trial Hurdle and won by eight lengths. The Glasgow Daily Record described the scenes at the course as resembling "a huge, happy, raucous party". He started 5/1 second favourite for the Champion Hurdle and finished fourth behind Collier Bay, Alderbrook and Pridwell. His bid for a third Aintree Hurdle ended in failure as he ran third to the novice Urubande.

=== 1996–2000: steeplechases ===
The 1996/1997 season saw Danoli switched to racing over larger obstacles as he began his career as a steeplechaser. He won minor races at Clonmel and Naas before falling for the first time in his career in a race at Fairyhouse won by Doran's Pride. At Leopardstown on Boxing Day he won his first major race over fences as he beat the English challenger Land Afar by seven lengths in the Denny Gold Medal Chase. Danoli fell in the Arkle Novice Chase in January and then contested one of Ireland's most prestigious weight-for-age chase, the Hennessy Gold Cup at Leopardstown on 2 February. The field of experienced steeplechasers included the Cheltenham Gold Cup winners Jodami and Imperial Call as well as the multiple Grade I winner Merry Gale. Ridden by Treacy, Danoli disputed the lead from the start and stayed on under pressure to win by one and a half lengths from Jodami. His victory was greeted with enthusiastic celebrations from the Irish crowd, who treated him as an "equine folk hero". Danoli was made second favourite for the Cheltenham Gold Cup but was never going well and looked beaten when he fell two fences from the finish.

Injury problems kept Danoli off the racecourse for nineteen months. He returned in October 1998 and finished third to Doran's Pride in a race at Gowran Park, but was then sidelined by injury yet again. In February 2000, now twelve years old, Danoli unseated Treacy in the Hennessy but then showed signs of returning form as he finished third to Micko's Dream at Naas and second to His Song in the Grade II Newlands Chase at Navan Racecourse. Danoli returned to Navan on 25 March and recorded his first win in over three years by beating Jeffell by two and a half lengths. On his final appearance five weeks later, he fell at the sixth fence in the Punchestown Gold Cup.

== Retirement ==
Danoli's retirement was announced in August 2000 with Foley explaining that "he's given us some great memories and is a horse we'll hardly ever see the like of again. We just don't want to take any kind of chance with him in a chase and see him being put down." Danoli spent most of his retirement at the Irish National Stud, Kildare. During retirement he became inseparable from another favourite race horse from the 1990s, the Melbourne Cup winner Vintage Crop. He was euthanised in April 2006 after suffering from a severe bout of colic. According to Tom Foley, "they tried everything they could and had no choice but to put him down."

== Pedigree ==
Pedigree of Danoli (IRE), bay gelding, 1988
Sire The Parson (GB) 1968	Aureole; 1950	Hyperion	Gainsborough
Sire The Parson (GB) 1968	Aureole; 1950	Hyperion	Selene
Sire The Parson (GB) 1968	Aureole; 1950	Angelola	Donatello
Sire The Parson (GB) 1968	Aureole; 1950	Angelola	Feola
Sire The Parson (GB) 1968	Bracey Bridge; 1962	Chanteur	Chateau Bouscaut
Sire The Parson (GB) 1968	Bracey Bridge; 1962	Chanteur	La Diva
Sire The Parson (GB) 1968	Bracey Bridge; 1962	Rutherford Bridge	Sayajirao
Sire The Parson (GB) 1968	Bracey Bridge; 1962	Rutherford Bridge	Rustic Bridge
Dam Blaze Gold (IRE) 1974	Arizona Duke; 1968	Dud de Gueldre	Le Haar
Dam Blaze Gold (IRE) 1974	Arizona Duke; 1968	Dud de Gueldre	Nuit de Veille
Dam Blaze Gold (IRE) 1974	Arizona Duke; 1968	Arizonnette	Rigolo
Dam Blaze Gold (IRE) 1974	Arizona Duke; 1968	Arizonnette	Barbizonnette
Dam Blaze Gold (IRE) 1974	Jut Gold; 1957	Liberator	Djebel
Dam Blaze Gold (IRE) 1974	Jut Gold; 1957	Liberator	Liberation
Dam Blaze Gold (IRE) 1974	Jut Gold; 1957	Jut Put	Prestissimo
Dam Blaze Gold (IRE) 1974	Jut Gold; 1957	Jut Put	Come Hither (Family 42)
