= Fergie Sutherland =

Personal information
- Born: 1 June 1931 London, England
- Died: 31 October 2012 (aged 81) Macroom, County Cork, Ireland
- Occupation: Trainer

Horse racing career
- Sport: Horse racing

Major racing wins
- Queen Mary Stakes (1958); Falmouth Stakes (1962); Nas Na Riogh Novice Chase (1995); Morris Oil Chase (1995); Cheltenham Gold Cup (1996); Hennessy Gold Cup (1996)

Significant horses
- A.20 Tournella Fox King Go Go Gallant Tempo Pancho's Tango Imperial Call

Fergus "Fergie" Sutherland was an Irish National Hunt trainer and soldier, who was best known for training Imperial Call to win the Cheltenham Gold Cup in 1996.

== Early life ==
Sutherland was named after Fergus Bowes-Lyon, a brother of the Queen Mother who was killed during the Battle of Loos; Bowes-Lyon had been a friend of Sutherland's father Arthur.

Although Sutherland was born in London he spent most of his childhood in Scotland near the town of Peebles. He spent his summers at the Somerset seaside village of Porlock where prominent trainer Dick Hern taught him how to ride.

== Military career ==
He received his education at Eton and Sandhurst. He attained the rank of captain and was posted to the 5th Royal Inniskilling Dragoon Guards. During service with the regiment in the Korean War he lost his left leg in an explosion. Sutherland later recounted the event: "Going up a hill, one of the four troops I was with tripped the wire of a landmine and set off the blast. I was the only one badly injured". A soldier who was with him declared 'You're OK, Mr Fergie, it's only the leg'. "I knew that because I had already checked".

After a period of convalescence Sutherland was posted to Egypt.

He refused to allow his disability to affect his quality of life and commissioned artificial legs for specific activities – for instance, he had different legs for horse riding, shooting and dancing.

== Horse training ==
In 1957 he began his horse training career at Carlburg Stables in Newmarket as assistant to Geoffrey Brooke. In addition, he worked for Joe Lawson. Following Lawson's retirement, Sutherland's father purchased the Newmarket yard. During his initial season he enjoyed a considerable degree of success, his first winner coming when Tribune won at Wolverhampton in April 1958 and saddling a winner at Royal Ascot when A.20 won the Queen Mary Stakes 1958. She was ridden by Bill Rickaby, owned by H. Clifton, and started at odds of 5/1.

In 1967 Sutherland moved to County Cork in Ireland, when he heard his mother was contemplating selling Aghinagh House in Killinardrish. He transformed the dairy and pig farm into one of the country's most successful small racing stables.

=== Imperial Call ===
After an impressive start to the 1996 racing season, Imperial Call ridden by Wexford born Jockey Conor O'Dwyer, beat Master Oats by six lengths to win the Hennessy at Leopardstown. Later that year he captured the Gold Cup at Cheltenham. He was Sutherland's first runner at the festival and became the first Irish-trained horse since Dawn Run ten years previously to capture the "blue riband event".

He retired in 1996 but briefly resumed training for two years in 2000. Sutherland was awarded Irish Horse Racing Personality of the Year in 1996.

During his retirement he enjoyed shooting and occasionally fishing.

== Personal life ==
In April 1954 Sutherland married Judy Ranger in London. The reception was held in The Savoy. The couple had four children. After a brief second marriage he married for a third time to Ann. The marriage produced one daughter.

== Death ==
He died on 31 October 2012 at the Marymount Hospice in County Cork.
