= Beef Or Salmon =

Irish-bred Thoroughbred racehorse

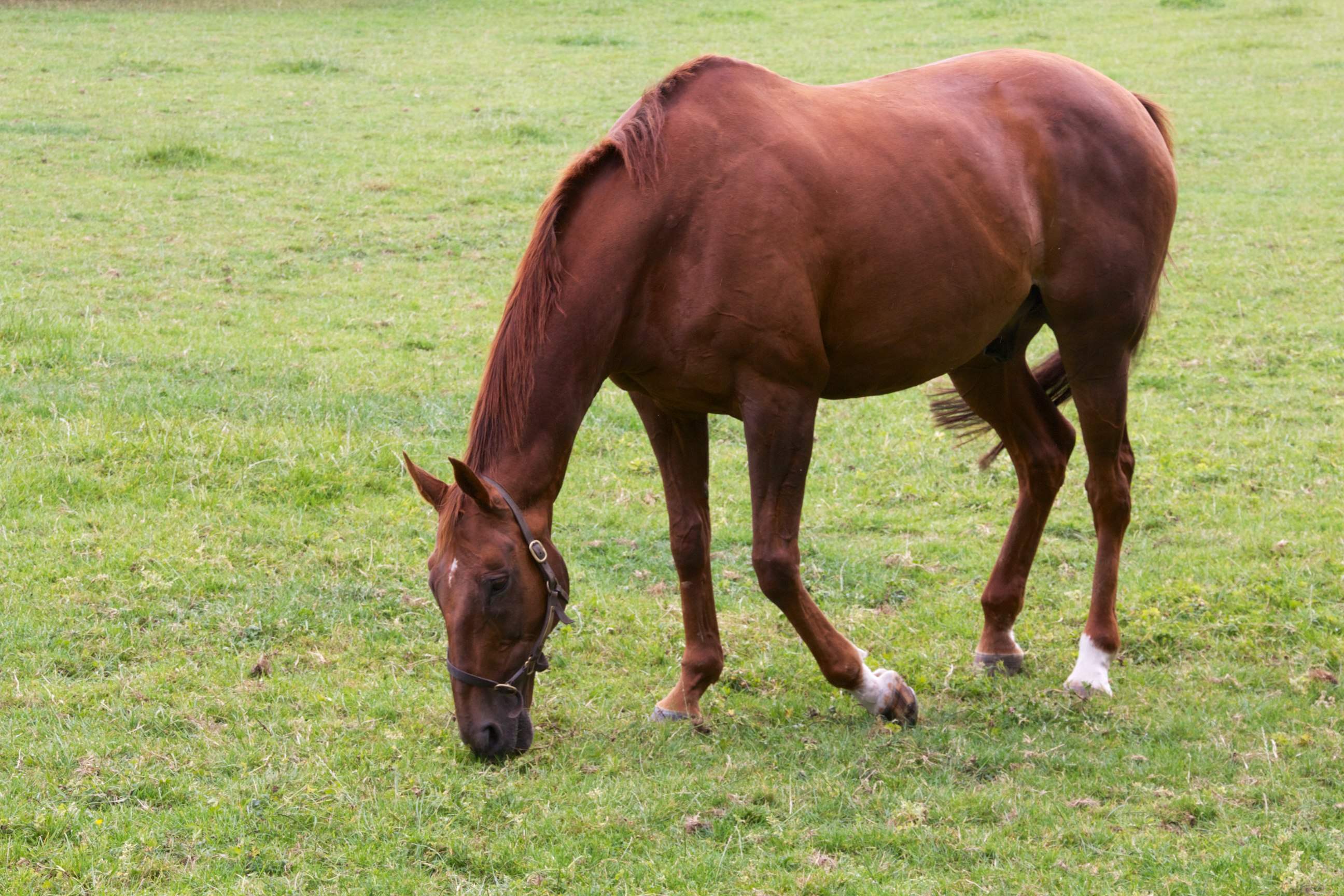
- Beef Or Salmon at the Irish National Stud in 2013.
- Sire: Cajetano
- Grandsire: Run The Gantlet
- Dam: Farinella
- Damsire: Salmon Leap
- Sex: Gelding
- Foaled: 30 April 1996
- Country: Ireland
- Colour: Chestnut
- Breeder: John Murphy
- Owner: B J Craig, D McLarnon
- Trainer: Michael Hourigan
- Record: 51: 19-9-6
- Earnings: £985,658

Major wins
- Clonmel Oil Chase (2002); Hilly Way Chase (2002, 2003); Lexus Chase (2002, 2004, 2005); Hennessy Gold Cup (2003, 2006, 2007); JNwine.com Champion Chase (2004, 2006); John Durkan Memorial Chase (2003); Punchestown Gold Cup (2004)

Beef Or Salmon is a multiple Grade 1 winning National Hunt racehorse. He was trained in Ireland by Michael Hourigan and owned by B J Craig And Dan McLarnon. He was most famous for defeating three Cheltenham Gold Cup winners in Best Mate, Kicking King, and War of Attrition and also for his defeat of the 2005 Grand National winner, Hedgehunter.

== Background ==
Beef Or Salmon is a chestnut horse bred in Ireland by John Murphy. He is the only horse of any consequence sired by Cajetano, an American-bred colt who had some success as a racehorse in Switzerland. Beef Or Salmon's dam Farinella showed no racing ability, finishing unplaced on her only racecourse appearance. She was descended from The Oaks winner Keystone, making her a distant relative of Display and Ballymoss.

== Early career ==
Beef Or Salmon made his racecourse debut in May 2001 at Fairyhouse, where he finished third in the Goffs Land Rover Bumper. He did not race again till November 2001, where he won a National Hunt flat race at Clonmel, before finishing second at Fairyhouse. Beef Or Salmon went on to run seven more times that season, winning twice.

== 2002/03 season ==
He made a winning seasonal reappearance in October at Galway and following that won the Clonmel Oil Chase and the Hilly Way Chase. He followed that up with two wins at the highest level in the Lexus Chase and Irish Hennessy Chase. He then went to the Cheltenham Festival, where he contested the Cheltenham Gold Cup. Beef Or Salmon fell as Best Mate won. He ended the season with victory in April in a Flat race at the Curragh.

== 2003/04 season ==
He started the 2003/04 season a beaten odds on favourite as he finished third behind Edredon Bleu in the Clonmel Oil Chase. In his next two starts, he won the John Durkan Memorial Chase and the Hilly Way Chase. December 2003 saw Beef Or Salmon come up against Best Mate again, and Best Mate won with Beef Or Salmon finishing third. His next run saw him cross the shores again, and he finished fourth behind Best Mate in the Cheltenham Gold Cup. He ended the season on a winning note as he took the Punchestown Gold Cup.

== 2004/05 season ==
To begin the 2004/05 season, Beef Or Salmon won the JNwine.com Champion Chase. He could only finish third on his next start though, behind Kicking King in the John Durkan Memorial Chase. In his next start, he beat Best Mate in the Lexus Chase. Then he finished second behind Rule Supreme in the Irish Hennessy Chase, before being pulled up in the Cheltenham Gold Cup, which was won by Kicking King.

== 2005/06 season ==
Beef Or Salmon started the season with a spin on the Flat and finished ninth in the Irish Cesarewitch in October before he came to Haydock and finished second behind Kingscliff in the Betfair Chase. He then won the Lexus Chase and the Irish Hennessy Chase, beating Hedgehunter by twelve lengths in the latter race. These wins saw Beef Or Salmon start off the 4/1 favourite for the Cheltenham Gold Cup, but he finished 11th behind War Of Attrition. He then unseated his rider, Paul Carberry, in the Totesport Bowl at Aintree before finishing third in a hurdle race at Fairyhouse. In his final race of the season, Beef Or Salmon finished second behind War Of Attrition in the Punchestown Gold Cup.

== Final two seasons ==
His final two seasons saw Beef Or Salmon run in the top races in England and Ireland, and he recorded three wins. He won the JNwine.com Champion Chase again, and also recorded a final victory in the Irish Hennessy Chase, beating The Listener. He was retired after running in the 2008 Punchestown Gold Cup.

== Retirement ==
In retirement Beef Or Salmon joined the living legends at the Irish National Stud. In 2020 the tourist attraction included Beef Or Salmon, Kicking King, Hardy Eustace, Rite of Passage and Hurricane Fly.

== Pedigree ==
Pedigree of Beef Or Salmon (IRE), chestnut gelding, 1996
Sire Cajetano (USA) 1986	Run the Gantlet (USA); 1968	Tom Rolfe	Ribot
Sire Cajetano (USA) 1986	Run the Gantlet (USA); 1968	Tom Rolfe	Pocahontas
Sire Cajetano (USA) 1986	Run the Gantlet (USA); 1968	First Feather	First Landing
Sire Cajetano (USA) 1986	Run the Gantlet (USA); 1968	First Feather	Quill
Sire Cajetano (USA) 1986	Intensive (USA); 1979	Sir Wiggle	Sadair
Sire Cajetano (USA) 1986	Intensive (USA); 1979	Sir Wiggle	Wiggle
Sire Cajetano (USA) 1986	Intensive (USA); 1979	Flying Legs	Palestine
Sire Cajetano (USA) 1986	Intensive (USA); 1979	Flying Legs	Alona
Dam Farinella (IRE) 1988	Salmon Leap (USA); 1980	Northern Dancer	Nearctic
Dam Farinella (IRE) 1988	Salmon Leap (USA); 1980	Northern Dancer	Natalma
Dam Farinella (IRE) 1988	Salmon Leap (USA); 1980	Fish-Bar	Baldric
Dam Farinella (IRE) 1988	Salmon Leap (USA); 1980	Fish-Bar	Fisherman's Wharf
Dam Farinella (IRE) 1988	Boldella (GB); 1977	Bold Lad (IRE)	Bold Ruler
Dam Farinella (IRE) 1988	Boldella (GB); 1977	Bold Lad (IRE)	Barn Pride
Dam Farinella (IRE) 1988	Boldella (GB); 1977	Ardelle	Supreme Court
Dam Farinella (IRE) 1988	Boldella (GB); 1977	Ardelle	Per Ardua (Family: 2-u)
