= Tom Foley (racehorse trainer) =

Irish racehorse trainer (1946–2021)

Personal information
- Full name: Thomas C. Foley
- Born: 1946 Bagenalstown, County Carlow, Ireland
- Died: 24 February 2021 (aged 74) Bagenalstown, County Carlow, Ireland
- Occupation: Trainer

Horse racing career
- Sport: Horse racing

Major racing wins
- Sun Alliance Novices' Hurdle (1994); Irish Gold Cup (1997)

Significant horses
- Danoli, Royal Paradise, Moon Man, The Subbie, Go Now, Dariak, Dancing Hero

Thomas C. Foley (1946 – 24 February 2021) was an Irish racehorse trainer.

== Career ==
Based at Bagenalstown, County Carlow, Foley switched from farming to training after buying an Irish draught horse, later building his own stables. His first winner was at Tramore in January 1988 when Rua Batric won a handicap hurdle at 6–1. He was involved in the training of Danoli, a horse that became popular during the 1990s and earned the nickname "the People's Champion". In 1994, the Foley-trained Danoli won the Sun Alliance Novices' Hurdle at the Cheltenham Festival, while further success followed with victory at the Hennessy Gold Cup at Leopardstown in 1997.

He played once as a half-back at minor level for the Carlow county football team, scoring two points.

== Death ==
Foley died of cancer on 24 February 2021.
