= Galopin Des Champs =

French-bred Thoroughbred National Hunt racehorse (2016–2026)

- Racing silks of Mrs Audrey Turley
- Sire: Timos
- Grandsire: Sholokhov (IRE)
- Dam: Manon Des Champs (FR)
- Damsire: Marchand De Sable (USA)
- Sex: Gelding
- Foaled: 12 May 2016
- Died: 1 September 2026 (aged 10)
- Colour: Black
- Breeder: G A E C Des Champs
- Owner: Mrs Audrey Turley
- Trainer: Willie Mullins
- Record: 26: 15-4-4
- Earnings: £1,961,010

Major wins
- Martin Pipe Conditional Jockeys' Handicap Hurdle (2021); Irish Mirror Novice Hurdle (2021); Dr P. J. Moriarty Novice Chase (2022); Boylesports Gold Cup (2022); John Durkan Memorial Punchestown Chase (2022); Irish Gold Cup (2023, 2024, 2025); Punchestown Gold Cup (2025); Cheltenham Gold Cup (2023, 2024); Savills Chase (2023, 2024); Timeform rating: 181

Honours
- Horse Racing Ireland Horse of the Year 2024, 2025 (joint); Anglo-Irish Jumps Classifications highest rated horse 2022/23, 2023/24, 2024/25 (joint)
- Last updated on 28 August 2026

Galopin Des Champs (12 May 2016 – 1 September 2026) was a French-bred, Irish-trained thoroughbred racehorse who competed in National Hunt racing. Trained by Willie Mullins and ridden by Paul Townend, he won the 2023 and 2024 Cheltenham Gold Cup and the 2023, 2024 and 2025 Irish Gold Cup. He was retired from racing in 2026, having won 12 Grade 1 races. Five days after his retirement was confirmed, he sustained a fatal leg injury in his paddock.

== Background ==
Galopin Des Champs was a black gelding who was bred in France by Hubert Bunel, under the pseudonym G A E C Des Champs. He was sired by Timos and his dam was Manon Des Champs.

== Racing career ==
=== 2020/21 season ===
On 17 May 2020, Galopin Des Champs won on debut in his native France at Auteuil before he was sold to Mrs Audrey Turley in November 2020 and was transferred to the yard of Willie Mullins in Ireland, to be looked after by groom Adam Connolly. His first win for Mullins came in the Martin Pipe Conditional Jockeys' Handicap Hurdle at the Cheltenham Festival on 19 March 2021, which was followed with a victory in the Irish Mirror Novice Hurdle at Punchestown on 28 April 2021.

=== 2021/22 season ===
In his second season, Galopin Des Champs won the Dr P. J. Moriarty Novice Chase at Leopardstown on 6 February 2022, but fell at the final fence while leading in the Golden Miller Novices' Chase at the Cheltenham Festival on 17 March 2022, handing victory to Bob Olinger. He finished the season with a victory in the Boylesports Gold Cup at Fairyhouse on 17 April 2022.

=== 2022/23 season ===
Galopin Des Champs began the season with a win in the John Durkan Memorial Punchestown Chase on 19 December 2022 and won the Irish Gold Cup on 4 February 2023, successfully adapting to a step up in trip. His next race was the 2023 Cheltenham Gold Cup on 17 March 2023 in which he started as the 7/5 favourite and went on to win by seven lengths, with Bravemansgame in second place. His final race of the season was the Punchestown Gold Cup, in which he started odds-on favourite and was beaten two and a quarter lengths into second place by 20/1 chance Fastorslow.

=== 2023/24 season ===
On 26 November 2023, Galopin Des Champs attempted a second consecutive victory in the John Durkan Memorial Punchestown Chase, but was beaten one and three-quarter lengths into third place by Fastorslow and Appreciate It. A month later he won the Savills Chase at Leopardstown by an impressive 23 lengths, before going on to secure back-to-back Irish Gold Cup victories at Leopardstown on 3 February 2024, beating Fastorslow by more than four lengths.

On 15 March 2024, Galopin Des Champs defended the Cheltenham Gold Cup, starting odds-on favourite in a field of eleven. In spite of having to contend with loose horse Fastorslow, who had unseated his jockey, he went clear before the last fence to beat Gerri Colombe by three-and-a-half lengths, with Corach Rambler in third place. His trainer said: "I think he just put himself into the superstar category, to do what he did and the way he did it with the loose horse". Galopin des Champs' final outing of the season was the Punchestown Gold Cup. Starting odds-on favourite, he was beaten one-and-a-quarter lengths into second place by Fastorslow in a repeat of the previous year's result.

=== 2024/25 season ===
The eight-year-old began his campaign with a third appearance in the John Durkan Memorial Punchestown Chase, on this occasion being beaten into third place by Fact To File and Spillane's Tower.

On 2 December 2024, Galopin Des Champs beat a strong field that included City of Troy and Kyprios to be crowned horse of the year at the Horse Racing Ireland awards.

On 28 December 2024, he beat Fact To File to secure a second victory in the Savills Chase. He then won a third consecutive victory in the Irish Gold Cup on 1 February 2025, beating Grangeclare West into second place and Fact To File into third. Mullins said: "He jumped and galloped for three miles and it didn't look like he was stopping coming up to the winning post. He's just a real champion". At the 2025 Cheltenham Festival, Galopin Des Champs attempted to emulate Arkle and Best Mate by winning a third Gold Cup, but was beaten six lengths into second place by Inothewayurthinkin. His next race was the Punchestown Gold Cup, in which he had twice been beaten into second place by Fastorslow. Starting odds-on favourite in a field of four, he made all to win by 22 lengths from Spillane's Tower. His trainer said: "He was back to his best, he was jumping at his ease".

=== 2025/26 season ===
Galopin Des Champs started as odds-on favourite in the Savills Chase on 28 December 2025, but could manage only third place. On 2 February 2026, he came third in the Irish Gold Cup A month later, Mullins said he had suffered a setback in training and would not attempt to regain his crown in the 2026 Cheltenham Gold Cup or run again in the season. His retirement from racing was confirmed on 27 August. Mullins said: "We took a collective decision to retire Galopin Des Champs at his age because we felt he could not do himself justice at the level he was used to. He retires a good, sound horse who will hopefully have a good second career as a sport horse." Owner Audrey Turley said that he had been moved to the farm of former jockey Ruby Walsh to be retrained by his daughter Isabelle.

== Death ==
On 1 September 2026, five days after his retirement was confirmed, Galopin Des Champs sustained a fatal leg injury in his paddock. Ruby Walsh said: "x-rays revealed extensive, unrepairable damage".

== Pedigree ==
Pedigree of Galopin des Champs (FR), black gelding, 2016
Sire Timos (GER) 2005	Sholokhov (IRE); 1999	Sadler's Wells (USA)	Northern Dancer (CAN)
Sire Timos (GER) 2005	Sholokhov (IRE); 1999	Sadler's Wells (USA)	Fairy Bridge
Sire Timos (GER) 2005	Sholokhov (IRE); 1999	La Meilleure	Lord Gayle (USA)
Sire Timos (GER) 2005	Sholokhov (IRE); 1999	La Meilleure	Gradille
Sire Timos (GER) 2005	Triclaria (GER); 1991	Surumu	Literat
Sire Timos (GER) 2005	Triclaria (GER); 1991	Surumu	Surama
Sire Timos (GER) 2005	Triclaria (GER); 1991	Tiputip	Nebos
Sire Timos (GER) 2005	Triclaria (GER); 1991	Tiputip	Tricky Flash
Dam Manon des Champs (FR) 2000	Marchand de Sable (USA); 1990	Theatrical (IRE)	Nureyev (USA)
Dam Manon des Champs (FR) 2000	Marchand de Sable (USA); 1990	Theatrical (IRE)	Tree of Knowledge
Dam Manon des Champs (FR) 2000	Marchand de Sable (USA); 1990	Mercantile (FR)	Kenmare
Dam Manon des Champs (FR) 2000	Marchand de Sable (USA); 1990	Mercantile (FR)	Mercuriale
Dam Manon des Champs (FR) 2000	Bianca des Champs (FR); 1989	Mont Rouge	Shirley Heights (GB)
Dam Manon des Champs (FR) 2000	Bianca des Champs (FR); 1989	Mont Rouge	Scarlet Woman (GB)
Dam Manon des Champs (FR) 2000	Bianca des Champs (FR); 1989	Carvelle	Carvin
Dam Manon des Champs (FR) 2000	Bianca des Champs (FR); 1989	Carvelle	Baldarella (Family 1-w)
