= 2023 Cheltenham Gold Cup =

Horse race in Britain

- Cheltenham Gold Cup
- Location: Cheltenham Racecourse
- Date: 17 March 2023
- Winning horse: Galopin Des Champs
- Starting price: 7-5 F
- Jockey: Paul Townend
- Trainer: Willie Mullins
- Owner: Mrs Audrey Turley
- Conditions: Soft

The 2023 Cheltenham Gold Cup (known as the Boodles Cheltenham Gold Cup for sponsorship reasons) was the 95th annual running of the Cheltenham Gold Cup horse race and was held at Cheltenham Racecourse, Gloucestershire, England, on 17 March 2023.

The race was won by the 7-5 favourite Galopin Des Champs, owned by Mrs Audrey Turley, trained in Ireland by Willie Mullins and ridden by Paul Townend. Mullins and Townend were both winning the Cheltenham Gold Cup for a third time in five years, after the victories of Al Boum Photo in 2019 and 2020. Bravemansgame finished second and Conflated was third.

== Result ==
Source -

	Dist	Horse	Age	Jockey	Trainer ^{†}	SP
1		Galopin Des Champs	7	Paul Townend	Willie Mullins (IRE)	7/5F
2	7	Bravemansgame	8	Harry Cobden	Paul Nicholls	6/1
3	6½	Conflated	9	Sam Ewing	Gordon Elliott (IRE)	22/1
4	1¼	Noble Yeats	8	Sean Bowen	Emmet Mullins (IRE)	14/1
5	½	Protektorat	8	Harry Skelton	Dan Skelton	25/1
6	9	Royale Pagaille	9	Charlie Deutsch	Venetia Williams	50/1
7	13	Eldorado Allen	9	Brendan Powell	Joe Tizzard	100/1
