= Irish Gold Cup =

Steeplechase horse race in Ireland

Irish Gold Cup
2026
Fact To File	Gaelic Warrior	Galopin Des Champs

Previous years
2025
Galopin Des Champs	Grangeclare West	Fact To File
2024
Galopin Des Champs	Fastorslow	I Am Maximus
2023
Galopin Des Champs	Stattler	Fury Road
2022
Conflated	Minella Indo	Janidil
2021
Kemboy	The Storyteller	Delta Work

2020-2011
2020
Delta Work	Kemboy	Presenting Percy
2019
Bellshill	Road To Respect	The Storyteller
2018
Edwulf	Outlander	Djakadam
2017
Sizing John	Empire Of Dirt	Don Poli
2016
Carlingford Lough	Road To Riches	Fine Rightly
2015
Carlingford Lough	Foxrock	Lord Windermere
2014
Last Instalment	Tidal Bay	First Lieutenant
2013
Sir Des Champs	Flemenstar	Joncol
2012
Quel Esprit	Roberto Goldback	Treacle
2011
Kempes	Glencove Marina	Joncol

2010-2001
2010
Joncol	Cooldine	Schindlers Hunt
2009
Neptune Collonges	Notre Pere	Chelsea Harbour
2008
The Listener	Turko	Snowy Morning
2007
Beef Or Salmon	The Listener	Hi Cloy
2006
Beef Or Salmon	Hedgehunter	Native Upmanship
2005
Rule Supreme	Beef Or Salmon	Cloudy Bays
2004
Florida Pearl	Le Coudray	Rince Ri
2003
Beef Or Salmon	Colonel Braxton	Harbour Pilot
2002
Alexander Banquet	Behrajan	Rince Ri
2001
Florida Pearl	Alexander Banquet	Dorans Pride

2000-1991
2000
Florida Pearl	Dorans Pride	Rince Ri
1999
Florida Pearl	Escartefigue	Addington Boy
1998
Dorans Pride	Dun Belle	Anabatic
1997
Danoli	Jodami	Imperial Call
1996
Imperial Call	Master Oats	Monsieur Le Cure
1995
Jodami	Merry Gale	Nuaffe
1994
Jodami	Deep Bramble	Force Seven
1993
Jodami	Chatam	General Idea
1992
Carvill's Hill	Garamycin	Gold Options
1991
Nick The Brief	Olan Lad	Roc De Prince

1990-1989
1990
Nick The Brief	Carvill's Hill	Maid Of Money
1989
Carvill's Hill	Weather The Storm	Lastofthebrownies

The Irish Gold Cup (Irish: Corn Óir na hÉireann) is a Grade 1 National Hunt steeplechase in Ireland which is open to horses aged five years or older. It is run at Leopardstown over a distance of about 3 miles (4,828 metres), and during its running there are seventeen fences to be jumped. The race is scheduled to take place each year in February.

The event was first run in 1987, and it was originally titled the Vincent O'Brien Irish Gold Cup. It was named after Vincent O'Brien (1917–2009), who was a successful racehorse trainer. The race was renamed the Hennessy Gold Cup in 1991, when Hennessy began sponsoring and it was often referred to as the "Irish Hennessy", as there was also a long-established chase in Great Britain called the Hennessy Gold Cup. Hennessy's sponsorship ended after the 2015 running and the 2016 event was run as the unsponsored Irish Gold Cup. Unibet sponsored the Irish Gold Cup from 2017 to 2019. In 2017, it was run as the Stan James Irish Gold Cup Chase and in 2018 and 2019 as the Unibet Irish Gold Cup. Since 2020 the race has been sponsored by Paddy Power.

Throughout its history the race has served as a leading trial for the Cheltenham Gold Cup. Four horses have won both events in the same year – Jodami (1993), Imperial Call (1996), Sizing John (2017) and Galopin Des Champs (2023 and 2024).

== Records ==
Most successful horse (4 wins):

- Florida Pearl – 1999, 2000, 2001, 2004

Leading jockey (4 wins):

- Mark Dwyer – Forgive 'n Forget (1987), Jodami (1993,1994,1995)

Leading trainer (15 wins):

- Willie Mullins - Florida Pearl (1999, 2000, 2001, 2004), Alexander Banquet (2002), Rule Supreme (2005), Kempes (2011), Quel Esprit (2012), Sir Des Champs (2013), Bellshill (2019), Kemboy (2021), Galopin Des Champs (2023, 2024, 2025), Fact To File (2026)

== Winners ==
- Amateur jockeys indicated by "Mr".

Year	Winner	Age	Jockey	Trainer
1987	Forgive 'n Forget	10	Mark Dwyer	Jimmy FitzGerald
1988	Playschool	10	Paul Nicholls	David Barons
1989	Carvill's Hill	7	Ken Morgan	Jim Dreaper
1990	Nick the Brief	8	Martin Lynch	John Upson
1991	Nick the Brief	9	Robbie Supple	John Upson
1992	Carvill's Hill	10	Peter Scudamore	Martin Pipe
1993	Jodami	8	Mark Dwyer	Peter Beaumont
1994	Jodami	9	Mark Dwyer	Peter Beaumont
1995	Jodami	10	Mark Dwyer	Peter Beaumont
1996	Imperial Call	7	Conor O'Dwyer	Fergie Sutherland
1997	Danoli	9	Tommy Treacy	Tom Foley
1998	Dorans Pride	9	Richard Dunwoody	Michael Hourigan
1999	Florida Pearl	7	Richard Dunwoody	Willie Mullins
2000	Florida Pearl	8	Paul Carberry	Willie Mullins
2001	Florida Pearl	9	Richard Johnson	Willie Mullins
2002	Alexander Banquet	9	Barry Geraghty	Willie Mullins
2003	Beef Or Salmon	7	Timmy Murphy	Michael Hourigan
2004	Florida Pearl	12	Richard Johnson	Willie Mullins
2005	Rule Supreme	9	David Casey	Willie Mullins
2006	Beef Or Salmon	10	Paul Carberry	Michael Hourigan
2007	Beef Or Salmon	11	Andrew McNamara	Michael Hourigan
2008	The Listener	9	Daryl Jacob	Robert & Sally Alner
2009	Neptune Collonges	8	Ruby Walsh	Paul Nicholls
2010	Joncol	7	Alain Cawley	Paul Nolan
2011	Kempes	8	David Casey	Willie Mullins
2012	Quel Esprit	8	Ruby Walsh	Willie Mullins
2013	Sir Des Champs	7	Davy Russell	Willie Mullins
2014	Last Instalment	9	Brian O'Connell	Philip Fenton
2015	Carlingford Lough	9	Tony McCoy	John Kiely
2016	Carlingford Lough	10	Mark Walsh	John Kiely
2017	Sizing John	7	Robbie Power	Jessica Harrington
2018	Edwulf	9	Mr Derek O'Connor	Joseph O'Brien
2019	Bellshill	9	Ruby Walsh	Willie Mullins
2020	Delta Work	7	Jack Kennedy	Gordon Elliott
2021	Kemboy	9	Danny Mullins	Willie Mullins
2022	Conflated	8	Davy Russell	Gordon Elliott
2023	Galopin Des Champs	7	Paul Townend	Willie Mullins
2024	Galopin Des Champs	8	Paul Townend	Willie Mullins
2025	Galopin Des Champs	9	Paul Townend	Willie Mullins
2026	Fact To File	9	Mark Walsh	Willie Mullins

== See also ==
- List of Irish National Hunt races
- Recurring sporting events established in 1987 – this race is included under its original title, Vincent O'Brien Irish Gold Cup.
