= Inothewayurthinkin =

Irish thoroughbred racehorse (born 2018)

- Racing silks of J P McManus
- Sire: Walk In The Park
- Dam: Sway
- Damsire: Califet
- Sex: Gelding
- Foaled: 4 April 2018
- Country: Ireland
- Colour: Bay
- Breeder: Noreen McManus
- Owner: J. P. McManus
- Trainer: Gavin Cromwell

Major wins
- Cheltenham Gold Cup (2025)

Honours
- Horse Racing Ireland Horse of the Year 2025 (joint)

Inothewayurthinkin (born 4 April 2018) is an Irish-bred, Irish-trained thoroughbred racehorse. A steeplechaser, he is best known for winning the 2025 Cheltenham Gold Cup.

Inothewayurthinkin is owned by J. P. McManus, and bred by his wife, Noreen. He is trained by Gavin Cromwell at Danestown in Co. Meath.

Much attention leading up to the 2025 Cheltenham Gold Cup was on Galopin Des Champs, winner in 2023 and 2024 and favoured to win a third time in a row. Inothewayurthinkin was added to the race as a supplementary entry. Ridden by Mark Walsh, Inothewayurthinkin beat the odds-on favourite into second place and won by six lengths.

The 2026 Cheltenham Gold Cup was won by Gaelic Warrior with Inothewayurthinkin finishing third.
