= Gavin Cromwell =

Irish racehorse trainer

Gavin Cromwell (born 29 September 1974) is an Irish dual-purpose racehorse trainer. He has won multiple Grade 1 races, including the 2025 Cheltenham Gold Cup.

== Background ==
Cromwell comes from Ardcath, County Meath, where his grandfather and uncle trained horses. Originally hoping to become a jockey, Cromwell worked in yards in Ireland, Newmarket and Australia, before returning to Ireland to start a four-year farrier apprenticeship. He took out a trainer's licence in 2005, while continuing to work as a farrier until he became established.

== Career as a trainer ==
Cromwell sent out his first winner from his Danestown yard in April 2007, when Dodder Walk won a handicap hurdle at Cork. He achieved his first Grade 1 success when Jer's Girl won the Mares Novice Hurdle Championship Final at Fairyhouse in March 2016. His first success at the Cheltenham Festival came in 2019, when Espoir d'Allen won the Champion Hurdle. When Inothewayurthinkin, owned by J. P. McManus and ridden by Mark Walsh, won the Cheltenham Gold Cup in 2025, it was the trainer's eighth victory at the Festival.

Although better known as a National Hunt trainer, Cromwell also trains horses to run on the flat and is one of the few trainers to have had winners at both the Cheltenham Festival and Royal Ascot, where his first winner was Quick Suzy in the Grade 2 Queen Mary Stakes.

== Personal life ==
Cromwell is married to Kiva, with whom he has three children.

== Cheltenham Festival winners (9) ==
- Cheltenham Gold Cup - (1) Inothewayurthinkin (2025)
- Champion Hurdle - (1) Espoir d'Allen (2019)
- Stayers' Hurdle - (2) Flooring Porter (2021, 2022)
- Albert Bartlett Novices' Hurdle - (1) Vanillier (2021)
- Liberthine Mares' Chase - (1) Limerick Lace (2024)
- Fulke Walwyn Kim Muir Challenge Cup - (1) Inothewayurthinkin (2024)
- Glenfarclas Cross Country Chase - (1) Stumptown (2025), Final Orders (2026)

== Other major wins ==
(Republic of Ireland) Ireland

- Mares Novice Hurdle Championship Final - (1) Jer's Girl (2016)
- Tattersalls Ireland Champion Novice Hurdle - (1) Jer's Girl (2016)
- Christmas Hurdle - (1) Flooring Porter (2020)
- Spring Juvenile Hurdle - (1) Hello Neighbour (2025)

(United Kingdom) Great Britain

- Mildmay Novices' Chase - (1) Inothewayurthinkin (2024)
