= Cork Racecourse =

Horse racing venue in Ireland

Coordinates: 52.130833°N 8.641389°W

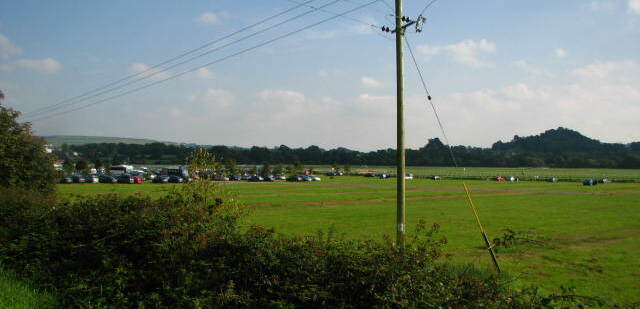
Cork Racecourse Mallow

Cork Racecourse, also known as Cork Racecourse Mallow, is a horse racing venue at Mallow, County Cork, Ireland which stages both National Hunt racing and Flat racing. It is located 35 km north of Cork and 64 km from Limerick

The course is right handed, one and a half miles round and has a straight sprint course of five furlongs. In 2017 work commenced on an extension to the straight course which will make it one of only two seven furlongs straights in Ireland.

The course was opened in 1924 and was originally known as Mallow Racecourse. It is close to Buttevant and Doneraile, where the first steeplechase was supposedly run in 1752.

== Emergency landing ==
On 18 April 1983, a Gulfstream II jet (registration XA-FOU) carrying 4 passengers and 4 crew, was travelling from New Jersey USA to Munich in Germany with a planned stop in Shannon to refuel, but could not land due to foggy weather. After a couple of missed approaches at Shannon, the plane was diverted to Cork Airport. The plane's captain, Ruben Ocaña, knowing he did not have enough fuel to make Cork, contacted Cork tower who directed him to Mallow Racecourse for an emergency landing, where he landed on a grass field with roughly three minutes of fuel to spare. The plane suffered minor damage to one of the wings when it hit a fence post during the landing.

Captain Ocaña told local media "I will be out of here once the ground dries out", but he and his crew remained stranded in Mallow for 39 days as the plane's insurers, Lloyds of London and Air Claims of America, insisted on a temporary 3,000-foot tarmac runway and rejected a proposal to take the wings off the plane and ferry it by road to Cork Airport.

Ocaña successfully took off 39 days later, on 23 May 1983, using this airstrip. The departure was broadcast on BTV and Captain Ocaña said a few words in Irish to say goodbye. After takeoff, which was witnessed by 2,000 people, Ocaña came back and made a low fly-pass over the temporary runway. These events inspired the 2010 film The Runway.

Captain Ocaña stayed in touch with many of the friends he made in Ireland over the years before his death in 2009. In April 2023, an "Ocaña Fest" event was held to mark 40 years since Ocaña landed at Mallow. It was attended by 27 members of his family and his daughters spread his ashes at Mallow. Whilst attended Ocaña Fest, his daughters also left a plaque reading:

"Deeply grateful to Mallow County people for your love and friendship to our father Captain Ruben Ocaña, part of him will remain here forever as he wished, 1983-2023. Captain Ocaña's daughters: Ana Elsa, Roxana, Mariana and Silvana".

== Notable races ==
Month	DOW	Race Name	Type	Grade	Distance	Age/Sex
April	Sunday	Imperial Call Chase	Chase	Grade 3	3m	5yo +
June	Sunday	Munster Oaks	Flat	Group 3	1m 4f	3yo + f
August	Thursday	Platinum Stakes	Flat	Listed	1m	3yo+
August	Thursday	Give Thanks Stakes	Flat	Group 3	1m 4f	3yo + f
November	Sunday	Cork E.B.F. Novice Hurdle	Hurdle	Grade 3	3m	4yo +
November	Sunday	Cork E.B.F. Novice Chase	Chase	Grade 3	2m 4f	5yo +
December	Sunday	Lombardstown Mares Novice Chase	Chase	Grade 3	2m 1f	4yo + m
December	Sunday	Hilly Way Chase	Chase	Grade 2	2m	5yo +
December	Sunday	Cork Stayers Novice Hurdle	Hurdle	Grade 3	3m	4yo +
