= Navan Racecourse =

Horse racing venue in Navan, Ireland

Coordinates: 53.6833°N 6.6737°W

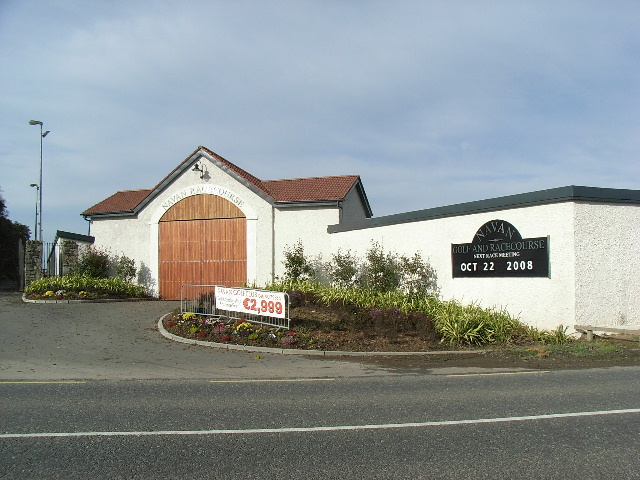
Navan Racecourse

Navan Racecourse is a horse racing venue at Proudstown near Navan, County Meath, Ireland, approximately 48 kilometres from Dublin. The course stages Flat racing but is best known for National Hunt racing. Navan Racecourse is owned by Horse Racing Ireland.

The course is 1 1/2 miles round with a home straight of 3 1/2 furlongs, left-handed with wide sweeping bends and an uphill finish from two furlongs out. There is a straight sprint course of six furlongs.

== Notable races ==
Month	DOW	Race Name	Type	Grade	Distance	Age/Sex
February	Sunday	Boyne Hurdle	Hurdle	Grade 2	2m 5f	5yo +
February	Sunday	Ten Up Novice Chase	Chase	Grade 2	3m	5yo +
February	Sunday	Flyingbolt Novice Chase	Chase	Grade 3	2m 1f	5yo +
March	Saturday	Webster Cup Chase	Chase	Grade 2	2m 4f	5yo +
April	Saturday	Ballysax Stakes	Flat	Group 3	1m 2f	3yo only
May	Sunday	Vintage Crop Stakes	Flat	Group 3	1m 6f	4yo +
November	Sunday	Lismullen Hurdle	Hurdle	Grade 2	2m 4f	4yo +
November	Sunday	Fortria Chase	Chase	Grade 2	2m	5yo +
November	Sunday	For Auction Novice Hurdle	Hurdle	Grade 3	2m	4yo +
November	Sunday	Monksfield Novice Hurdle	Hurdle	Grade 2	2m 4f	4yo +
December	Sunday	Tara Hurdle	Hurdle	Handicap	2m 4f	4yo +
December	Sunday	Navan Novice Hurdle	Hurdle	Grade 1	2m 4f	4yo +
