= Mark Walsh (jockey) =

Irish jockey

Mark Walsh (born 23 March 1986) is an Irish jockey who competes in National Hunt racing.

Walsh grew up in Clane, County Kildare. He is not related to jockey Ruby Walsh, but his older cousin David Walsh was a jockey. He learnt to ride at an early age and took part in pony racing. Aged fifteen, he went to work at the yard of trainer Christy Roche. He rode his first winner on Shrug in a handicap hurdle at Punchestown in September 2002.

After enjoying some early success, he went through a lean period for three seasons before securing 19 winners in the 2008/09 season, including Glenfinn Captain, owned by J. P. McManus and trained by Tom Taaffe, in the Grade 2 Red Mills Chase at Gowran Park. He achieved his first Grade 1 success when Defy Logic won the Racing Post Novice Chase at Leopardstown in December 2013. He won the Irish Gold Cup in 2016 on Carlingford Lough, who was owned by McManus. He had his first win at the Cheltenham Festival in the 2018 Coral Cup on Bleu Berry and the following year won the Champion Hurdle on 16/1 outsider Espoir D'Allen, the second string of owner McManus. Already retained by McManus to ride his horses in Ireland, Walsh rode more of the owner's top horses in Britain after Barry Geraghty retired in 2020. The partnership narrowly missed out on Grand National success in 2022, when Any Second Now came second, having come third the previous year.

In March 2025, Walsh rode Inothewayurthinkin, owned by McManus and trained by Gavin Cromwell in Ireland, to victory in the Cheltenham Gold Cup. He said after the race: "It's something you dream of when you’re a kid wanting to be a jockey, winning the Gold Cup and the Grand National and things like that, so it's a dream come true".

== Cheltenham Festival winners (16) ==
- Cheltenham Gold Cup - (1) Inothewayurthinkin (2025)
- Champion Hurdle - (1) Espoir d'Allen (2019)
- Stayers' Hurdle - (1) Sire Du Berlais (2023)
- Broadway Novices' Chase - (1) Fact To File (2024)
- Ryanair Chase - (1) Fact To File (2025)
- Gallagher Novices' Hurdle - (1) City Island (2019)
- Albert Bartlett Novices' Hurdle - (1) Vanillier (2021)
- Fred Winter Juvenile Novices' Handicap Hurdle - (4) Aramax (2020), Brazil (2022), Puturhandstogether (2025), Saratoga (2026)
- Liberthine Mares' Chase - (3) Elimay (2022), Dinoblue (2025, 2026)
- Coral Cup - (1) Bleu Berry (2018)
- Triumph Hurdle - (1) Majborough (2024)

== Other major wins ==
(Republic of Ireland) Ireland

- Irish Gold Cup - (2) Carlingford Lough (2016), Fact To File (2026)
- WillowWarm Gold Cup - (1) Spillane's Tower (2024)
- Champion Stayers Hurdle - (2) Jezki (2015), Unowhatimeanharry (2019)
- Drinmore Novice Chase - (2) Coney Island (2016), Fakir D’oudairies (2019)
- Dublin Chase - (1) Majborough (2026)
- Racing Post Novice Chase - (3) Defy Logic (2013), Le Richebourg (2018), Saint Roi (2022)
- Paddy Power Dial-A-Bet Chase - (3) Simply Ned (2017, 2018), Dinoblue (2023)
- KPMG Champion Novice Hurdle - (2) Mystical Power (2024), Irancy (2025)
- Dr P. J. Moriarty Novice Chase - (2) Fact To File (2024), Kaid 'Authie (2026)
- Neville Hotels Novice Chase - (1) Shattered Love (2017)
- Greenmount Park Novice Chase - (1) Gilgamboa (2014)
- Arkle Novice Chase - (2) Le Richebourg (2019), Majborough (2025)
- Spring Juvenile Hurdle - (2) Sir Erec (2019), Narciso Has (2026)
- Dooley Insurance Group Champion Novice Chase - (2) Capodanno (2022), Spillane's Tower (2024)
- John Durkan Chase - (1) Fact To File (2024)
- Barberstown Castle Novice Chase - (1) Majborough (2025)
- Champion Four Year Old Hurdle - (1) Saratoga (2026)

(United Kingdom) Great Britain

- Anniversary 4-Y-O Novices' Hurdle - (1) Zenta (2023)
- Ascot Chase - (1) Fakir D'oudairies (2022)
- Liverpool Hurdle - (2) Sire Du Berlais (2022, 2023)
- Maghull Novices' Chase - (1) Gentleman De Mee (2022)
- Melling Chase - (2) Fakir D'oudairies (2021, 2022)
- Mildmay Novices' Chase - (1) Inothewayurthinkin (2024)
- Sefton Novices' Hurdle - (1) Champ (2019)
- Top Novices' Hurdle - (1) Mystical Power (2024)
- Turners Mersey Novices' Hurdle - (1) Honesty Policy (2025)
