= Apple's Jade =

French-bred racehorse

- Racing silks of Gigginstown House Stud
- Sire: Saddler Maker
- Grandsire: Sadler's Wells
- Dam: Apple's For Ever
- Damsire: Nikos
- Sex: Mare
- Foaled: 24 April 2012
- Country: France
- Colour: Bay
- Breeder: Ronny Coveliers
- Owner: Damien Coveliers; Gigginstown House Stud
- Trainer: Emmanuel Clayeux; Willie Mullins; Gordon Elliott
- Record: 28: 15-5-4
- Earnings: £814,910

Major wins
- Knight Frank Juvenile Hurdle (2015); Anniversary Juvenile Hurdle (2016); Champion Four Year Old Hurdle (2016); Hatton's Grace Hurdle (2016, 2017, 2018); David Nicholson Mares' Hurdle (2017); Mares Champion Hurdle (2017); Lismullen Hurdle (2017, 2018); Christmas Hurdle (2017, 2018, 2019); Irish Champion Hurdle (2019)

Apple's Jade (foaled 24 April 2012) is a French-bred, Irish-trained Thoroughbred racehorse who competed in National Hunt hurdle races. She won 11 times at Grade I level, making her one of the most successful jumping mares of all time.

After winning her only race in her native country she was sold and exported to Ireland. In her first season at her new base she was one of the best juvenile hurdlers in the British Isles, winning the Knight Frank Juvenile Hurdle, Anniversary Juvenile Hurdle and Champion Four Year Old Hurdle as well as finishing second in the Triumph Hurdle. In the following season she was narrowly beaten in the Fighting Fifth Hurdle but proceeded to win the Hatton's Grace Hurdle, David Nicholson Mares' Hurdle and Mares Champion Hurdle. In the 2017/2018 National Hunt season she won the Lismullen Hurdle, a second Hatton's Grace Hurdle and the Christmas Hurdle. In her next season she repeated her successes in the Lismullen Hurdle, Hatton's Grace Hurdle and Christmas Hurdle but was beaten when favourite for the Champion Hurdle. In the curtailed 2019/2020 National Hunt season she failed to consistently reproduce her best form but recorded an eleventh Grade I success when she won the Christmas Hurdle for the third time.

== Background ==
Apple's Jade is a bay mare with a small white star bred in France by Ronny Coveliers. She began her racing career in the ownership of Damien Coveliers and was initially trained in France by Emmanuel Clayeux.

She was sired by Saddler Maker, a well-bred horse who made no impact on the track as he failed to win in four races. He later had more success as a sire of jumpers, with the best of his other progeny including Bristol de Mai (Betfair Chase), Alpha des Obeaux (Clonmel Oil Chase) and Janika (Haldon Gold Cup).

Apple's Jade's dam Apple's For Ever showed no racing ability, but her granddam Apple's Girl was a high-class hurdler who finished third in the Grand Prix d'Automne and fourth in the French Champion Hurdle. She was a distant female line descendant of the British broodmare Miss Wiss (foaled 1919) who was a full-sister to both Sunny Jane and Craig an Eran.

== Racing career ==
=== 2015/2016 National Hunt season ===
On her racecourse debut Apple's Jade contested a hurdle race over 3300 metres on soft ground at Vichy on 5 May and won by five and a half lengths at odds of 21/1.

The mare was subsequently acquired by the Gigginstown House Stud and sent to Ireland where she joined the stable of Willie Mullins at Bagenalstown, County Carlow.

On her first run in Ireland Apple's Jade started at odds of 12/1 for the Grade 2 Knight Frank Juvenile Hurdle over two miles at Leopardstown Racecourse on 26 December and produced a strong late run to win by a head from Jer's Girl. On her next appearance the filly was stepped up to the highest class when she was sent to England to contest the Grade 1 Triumph Hurdle at Cheltenham Racecourse on 18 March. She took the lead approaching the penultimate flight of hurdles but was overtaken by the favourite Ivanovich Gorbatov in the last hundred yards and beaten into second place by one and a quarter lengths.

Apple's Jade was fitted with earplugs when she faced a rematch with Ivanovich Gorbatov in the Anniversary Hurdle at Aintree Racecourse on 7 April. Ridden by Bryan Cooper she went to the front at the third last hurdle and pulled away from her opponents to win by more than forty lengths. After the race Willie Mullins said "I could not dream of anything like that... That was extraordinary the performance she put in there. I thought Bryan was mad going on before he turned in, you could see him letting her slip into the lead and I thought ‘this straight is far too long with hurdles to jump, keep a little bit up your tank’, but when he got off her he said he still had plenty left in the tank."

Twenty-three days after her win at Aintree Apple's Jade was matched against Ivanovich Gorbatov for a third time in the Champion Four Year Old Hurdle at Punchestown Racecourse. Starting the 8/13 favourite she led from the start and steadily increased her advantage over the last two hurdles to win "easily" by nine lengths from her stablemate Let's Dance. Mullins commented "She had a very hard race in Aintree and I wondered if it would impact on her today... She looks very, very good. She won at Christmas but then we had an awful time as she was stiff and sore and we couldn't train her. She came back at Cheltenham and that put her right as she flew in at Aintree. I'd say we will leave it at that [for the season]."

=== 2016/2017 National Hunt season ===
For the next National Hunt season Apple's Jade was transferred to the stable of Gordon Elliott in County Meath after Gigginstown's owner Michael O'Leary had a disagreement with Mullins over training fees. On her first run for her new trainer, the mare started 1/2 favourite for the WKD Hurdle at Down Royal Racecourse on 4 November but after leading for most of the way she was overtaken in the closing stages and beaten into second place by Rashaan. Later that month she was sent to England for the Grade 1 Fighting Fifth Hurdle at Newcastle Racecourse. She lost her position after being hampered by the fall of Petit Mouchoir at the third last and despite rallying strongly she failed by a nose to overhaul the eight-year-old gelding Irving. In the Hatton's Grace Hurdle at Fairyhouse in December Apple's Jade started second favourite behind the Punchestown Champion Hurdle winner Vroum Vroum Mag in a seven-runner field which also included Ivanovich Gorbatov and Shaneshill (Champion INH Flat Race). After tracking the leaders Apple's Jade, with Cooper in the saddle, went to the front three obstacles from the finish but was joined at the last by the favourite. The two mares drew away from their opponents on the run-in, and although Vroum Vroum Mag gained the advantage, Apple's Jade came on again in the final strides to win by a head. Explaining his horse's improvement O'Leary said "She may have suffered a bit in the transition from Willie's to Gordon's. When we ran her first, she probably just wasn’t fit enough. I think Newcastle brought her on a tonne".

Apple's Jade returned to all-female competition for the Quevega Mares Hurdle at Punchestown on 22 February but despite starting the 2/5 favourite she proved no match for the Mullins-trained Limini and was beaten two lengths into second place. On 14 March at Cheltenham the mare was equipped with a tongue-tie for the first time when she started third choice in the betting behind Limini and Vroum Vroum Mag in the Grade 1 David Nicholson Mares' Hurdle: the only other contenders in the seventeen-strong field to start at less than 33/1 were Jer's Girl and Lifeboat Mona. Cooper settled Apple's Jade behind the leaders and took the lead at half way but was headed at the final flight by Vroum Vroum Mag. As in her previous start she rallied strongly on the run-in to regain the advantage and drew away in the closing stages to win by one and a half lengths with Limini a nose away in third. After the race Elliott said Today was her Gold Cup. We knew the ground would suit her and I put a tongue tie on for the first time and thankfully it worked out. We kept our mouths shut after Punchestown because we knew she would come on a good bit for it. The tongue tie and drying ground were a big help... she's as tough as old boots."

Apple's Jade ended her season in the Mares Champion Hurdle at Punchestown on 29 April and started favourite, with the best-fancied of her six opponents being the Mullins trained Augusta Kate (Mares Novice Hurdle Championship Final) and Karalee. After tracking the front-running Airlie Beach she took the lead at the penultimate flight and drew right away to win "easily" by fourteen lengths. Bryan Cooper commented Cooper said: "She did it very well. I was a little worried turning out of the back as she hit a flat spot. She's probably getting a bit better and racing a bit lazier. She stuck her head out and it's only when she got upsides she started racing."

=== 2017/2018 National Hunt season ===
Jack Kennedy took over as Apple's Jade's regular jockey for the 2017/2018 National Hunt season. She began her campaign in the Grade 2 Lismullen Hurdle at Navan Racecourse on 12 November and won comfortably by two lengths from her old rival Jer's Girl after leading from the start. Three weeks later she attempted to repeat her 2016 success in the Hatton's Grace Hurdle and headed the betting from the multiple Grade 1 winner Nichols Canyon and the Herald Champion Novice Hurdle winner Cilaos Emery. both representing the Mullins stable. Kennedy sent the mare into the lead from the start and she increased her advantage over the last two hurdles to win by nine lengths from Nichols Canyon with the Coral Cup winner Supasundae in third. After the race Kennedy said "She seems to be getting better. She's a lot stronger this year. She's not slow, but she stays galloping and is able to gallop them into the ground over that (two-and-a-half-mile) trip... she's definitely one of the best I've ridden."

On 28 December Apples Jade was stepped up in distance for the Irish Christmas Hurdle over three miles and started the 4/6 favourite in a six-runner field which included Nichols Canyon, Supasundae, Jezki and Augusta Kate. With Davy Russell deputising for the injured Kennedy, the mare disputed the early lead before settling in second behind Supasundae and produced a strong late run to gain the advantage near the finish and win by half a length. The race was marred by the death of Nichols Canyon who was euthanised after a fall at the fifth flight.

At Cheltenham on 13 March Apple's Jade started the 1/2 favourite in a nine-runner field as she attempted to repeat in the David Nicholson Hurdle. She was in contention from the start but after having every chance at the last hurdle she was unable to make progress on the heavy ground and was beaten into third place by Benie des Dieux (trained by Mullins) and the outsider Midnight Tour. Despite her defeat the mare started favourite ahead of Benie des Dieux in the Mares Champion Hurdle at Punchestown in April. She took the lead at half way, but was overtaken by her rival approaching the last and lost second place to Augusta Kate in the closing stages.

=== 2018/2019 National Hunt season ===
The first half of Apples's Jade's 2018/2019 campaign followed the pattern set in the previous season. She began by repeating her success in the Lismullen Hurdle, leading from the start and coming home eleven lengths clear of Jezki. She then attempted to complete a hat-trick of victories in the Hatton's Grace Hurdle on 2 December and started 5/6 favourite in a field of nine. After tracking the front-running Wicklow Brave she went to the front after the third last and steadily increased her advantage to win by twenty lengths from Supasundae with Limini two lengths back in third place. Gordon Elliott commented "You are always nervous when you've got something like her running, and when she went down and jumped the last it was a big relief. Horses like her are what the public want to see and I'm lucky enough to be training her. Jack said he knew halfway down the back there was plenty there. She loves a fight and is something else".

As in 2017, Apple's Jade ended her year in the Christmas Hurdle at Leopardstown and started the 8/13 against seven opponents including Faugheen, Bapaume (Champion Four Year Old Hurdle), Jezki and Shaneshill. Kennedy sent her into the lead from the start and having been left with no serious challengers when her closest pursuer Faugheen fell at the second last she came home 26 lengths clear of the outsider Early Doors. After the race Kennedy said "I had to make the running again on her, but it didn't matter. (She) jumped great, travelled away, jumped the second last and she changed gears and was away from the back of it and galloped all the way to the line. She was very good. I could see on the big screen I was fairly well clear of what was in behind me. She's unreal, she is a pleasure to be riding. She was in good form this time last year and then lost her way, so hopefully she can keep continuing this way anyway".

At Leopardstown on 2 February Apple's Jade raced over two miles for the first time since 2016 when she contested the Irish Champion Hurdle and started 8/13 favourite against five opponents including Supasundae, Melon (runner-up in the 2018 Champion Hurdle) and Petit Mouchoir (winner of the race in 2017). She made all the running, held a two-length advantage approaching the final flight and drew away on the run-in to win by a record margin of sixteen lengths from Supasundae. When asked about the mare's likely target at the Cheltenham Festival Elliott said "We will get her home and discuss it with the owners. She's [entered] in the Champion Hurdle, she's in the Mares' Hurdle and she's in the Stayers' Hurdle... Everything is a possibility now."

On 12 March at Cheltenham Apple's Jade started the 7/4 favourite in a ten-runner for the 2019 Champion Hurdle as she attempted to become the fourth mare (after African Sister, Dawn Run, Flakey Dove and Annie Power) to take the title. After appearing to be going well in the first half of the race she began to struggle approaching the third last and faded to come home sixth of the seven finishers behind Espoir d'Allen, beaten almost 30 lengths by the winner. Elliott could offer no explanation for the poor performance. Apple's Jade returned to England for the Liverpool Hurdle over three miles at Aintree Racecourse in April. Starting odds-on favourite she led for most of the way but was caught in the closing stages and beaten a head and a neck into third place by If The Cap Fits and Roksana. The mare ended her season in the Punchestown Champion Hurdle over two miles on 3 May when she came home fifth behind Buveur d'Air, Supasundae, Wicklow Brave and Petit Mouchoir.

=== 2019/2020 National Hunt season ===
On her first appearance of the 2019/2020 National Hunt season Apple's Jade attempted to win the Lismullen Hurdle again but after taking an early lead she was overtaken at the penultimate obstacle and beaten into second place by the Tattersalls Ireland Champion Novice Hurdle winner Bacardys. On her next appearance she made a bid to win the Hatton's Grace Hurdle for a record-breaking fourth time but despite briefly taking the lead at the third last she was soon overtaken and came home third behind Honeysuckle and Bacardys, beaten thirteen lengths by the winner. The Christmas Hurdle (renamed the Frank Ward Memorial Hurdle) at Leopardstown on 28 December saw the mare start 6/4 joint favourite with Bacardys in a seven-runner field which also included Penhill (Stayers' Hurdle), Unowhatimeanharry (Champion Stayers Hurdle) and Killultagh Vic (Irish Daily Mirror Novice Hurdle). Apple's Jade went to the front at the first hurdle and was never in any danger of defeat, steadily increasing her advantage and winning "easily" by seventeen lengths from Unowhatimeanharry. Michael O'Leary admitted "If she hadn't run well today, she was going to be retired... She was very lifeless at Fairyhouse and in Navan, which isn't like her. It looks like she's back, which is great... if she runs like that and jumps like that, we'll keep going. She'll tell us herself – she's like all ladies when they decide they've had enough, they've had enough".

On 23 January at Gowran Park Apple's Jade contested the Grade 2 Galmoy Hurdle, a three-mile race which was run in thick fog making accurate reporting difficult. Ridden by Davy Russell, Apple's Jade was in front at half way but faded badly thereafter and was pulled up before the second last. At Cheltenham on 12 March the mare started at odds of 7/1 for the Stayer's Hurdle and led for most of the way before dropping from contention approaching the second last and finishing eighth behind the 50/1 outsider Lisnagar Oscar.

After her run in the Stayer's Hurdle Elliott announced that the mare would be retired from racing forthwith. He said "She's been the horse of lifetime. She's going to go to stud now. We've been lucky to train her. She enjoyed herself today. The engine just isn't go as fast it used to be. She owes us nothing."

== Breeding career ==
In December 2020, Apple's Jade was sold to Noel and Valerie Moran of Bective Stud for €530,000, a record price for a National Hunt mare sold at public auction. She was in foal to Walk in the Park and gave birth to a filly foal in April 2021.

== Pedigree ==
Pedigree of Apple's Jade (FR), bay mare, 2012
Sire Saddler Maker (IRE) 1998	Sadler's Wells (USA); 1981	Northern Dancer (CAN)	Nearctic
Sire Saddler Maker (IRE) 1998	Sadler's Wells (USA); 1981	Northern Dancer (CAN)	Natalma (USA)
Sire Saddler Maker (IRE) 1998	Sadler's Wells (USA); 1981	Fairy Bridge	Bold Reason
Sire Saddler Maker (IRE) 1998	Sadler's Wells (USA); 1981	Fairy Bridge	Special
Sire Saddler Maker (IRE) 1998	Animatrice (USA); 1985	Alleged	Hoist The Flag
Sire Saddler Maker (IRE) 1998	Animatrice (USA); 1985	Alleged	Princess Pout
Sire Saddler Maker (IRE) 1998	Animatrice (USA); 1985	Alexandrie	Val de l'Orne
Sire Saddler Maker (IRE) 1998	Animatrice (USA); 1985	Alexandrie	Apachee
Dam Apple's For Ever (FR) 2000	Nikos (GB); 1981	Nonoalco (USA)	Nearctic (CAN)
Dam Apple's For Ever (FR) 2000	Nikos (GB); 1981	Nonoalco (USA)	Seximee
Dam Apple's For Ever (FR) 2000	Nikos (GB); 1981	No No Nanette (FR)	Sovereign Path (GB)
Dam Apple's For Ever (FR) 2000	Nikos (GB); 1981	No No Nanette (FR)	Nuclea (GER)
Dam Apple's For Ever (FR) 2000	Apple's Girl (FR); 1989	Le Pontet	Succes
Dam Apple's For Ever (FR) 2000	Apple's Girl (FR); 1989	Le Pontet	Arielle
Dam Apple's For Ever (FR) 2000	Apple's Girl (FR); 1989	Silver Girl	Son of Silver (GB)
Dam Apple's For Ever (FR) 2000	Apple's Girl (FR); 1989	Silver Girl	Our Best (Family: 16-h)

- Apple's Jade is inbred 4 × 4 to Nearctic, meaning that this stallion appears twice in the fourth generation of her pedigree.
