= O'Driscolls Irish Whiskey Juvenile Hurdle =

Hurdle horse race in Ireland

Knight Frank Juvenile Hurdle
2025
Narciso Has	Adrienne	North Shore

Previous years
2024
Hello Neighbour	Lady Vega Allen	Sony Bill
2023
Kala Conti	Kargese	Nurburgring
2022
Lossiemouth	Gala Marceau	Nusret
2021
Fil Dor	Lunar Power	Britzka

2020-2011
2020
Zanahiyr	Busselton	Ha D'or
2019
Aspire Tower	Wolf Prince	A Wave Of The Sea
2018
Rocky Blue	Chief Justice	Got Trumped
2017
Espoir D'allen	Farclas	Mitchouka
2016
Bapaume	Landofhopeandglory	Mega Fortune
2015
Apple's Jade	Jer's Girl	Footpad
2014
Fiscal Focus	Kalkir	Prussian Eagle
2013
Guitar Pete	Clarcam	Henry Higgins
2012
Blood Cotil	Stocktons Wing	Fisher
2011
His Excellency	One Cool Shabra	Burrenbridge Lodge

2010-2001
2010
Sailors Warn	Fearless Falcon	Accidental Outlaw
2009
Carlito Brigante	Alaivan	Leblon
2008
Lethal Weapon	Tharawaat	King Of Queens
2007
Won In The Dark	Indian Spring	The Ethiopian
2006
Lounaos	Robin Du Bois	Deputy Consort
2005
Clear Riposte	Artist's Muse	Dreux
2004
Arch Rebel	Don't Be Bitin	Stromstad
2003
Top Strategy	Al Eile	Berkeley Note
2002
Party Airs	Kenilworth	Dyrick Daybreak
2001
Newhall	Moore's Law	Emperors Guest

2000-1991
2000
Pittsburgh Phil	Francies Fancy	Hill Port
1999
Calladine	Yeoman's Point	Francines-Boy
1998
Knife Edge	Golden Rule	Persian Isle
1997
Rainbow Frontier	Khairabar	Keeping The Faith
1996
Grimes	Greenhue	Rescue Time
1994
Notcomplainingbut	Clifdon Fog	Nun's Island
1993
Shirley's Delight	The Beruki	Magic Feeling
1992
Autumn Gorse	Titled Dancer	Arctic Weather
1991
Crowded House	Irish Peace	Novello Allegro

1990-1987
1990
Galevilla Express	Mounamara	Galaxy High
1989
Dail Eireann	Il Trovatore	Prince Lyphard
1988
Derrinore	Break Fast	Kinky Lady
1987
Old Dundalk	Dos Adventica	Atteses

The Mercedes-Benz South Dublin Juvenile Hurdle is a Grade 2 National Hunt hurdle race in Ireland. It is run at Leopardstown in December over a distance of about 2 miles (3,219 metres) and during the race there are eight flights of hurdles to be jumped.

The race is normally run on Saint Stephen's Day, during the course's Christmas Festival and is restricted to 3 year old horses only. It has been run under a series of sponsored titles - the 2012 running was called the Q8 Oil Juvenile Hurdle, the 2011 running was sponsored by the United Arab Emirates Embassy and in 2010 it was sponsored by the Bord na Móna peat harvesting company and run as the Bord na Mona Fire Magic Juvenile Hurdle. Prior to 2009 it was known as the Durkan New Homes Juvenile Hurdle and in 2009 it was run as the Inforthenight.ie Juvenile Hurdle.

In the 1990s the race was known as the Dennys Juvenile Hurdle.

== Records ==
Leading jockey since 1987 (3 wins):

- Davy Russell – Carlito Brigante (2009), His Excellency (2011), Fil Dor (2021)

Leading trainer since 1987 (6 wins):

- Willie Mullins – Clear Riposte (2005), Blood Cotil (2012), Apple's Jade (2015), Bapaume (2016), Lossiemouth (2022), Narciso Has (2025)

== Winners since 1987 ==
Year	Winner	Jockey	Trainer
1987	Old Dundalk	Frank Berry	David Murray Smith
1988	Derrinore	P Kavanagh	Paddy Mullins
1989	Dail Eireann	Anthony Powell	Mick O'Toole
1990	Galevilla Express	C N Bowens	Victor Bowens
1991	Crowded House	Josh Byrne	Barry Kelly
1992	Autumn Gorse	Charlie Swan	Mrs A M O'Brien
1993	Shirley's Delight	Paul Carberry	Noel Meade
1994	Notcomplainingbut	Tommy Treacy	Paddy Mullins
1995	Cancelled due to frozen course
1996	Grimes	Conor O'Dwyer	Christy Roche
1997	Rainbow Frontier	Charlie Swan	Aidan O'Brien
1998	Knife Edge	Tom Rudd	Michael O'Brien
1999	Calladine	Eddie Callaghan	Steve Mahon
2000	Pittsburgh Phil	Tom Rudd	Michael O'Brien
2001	Newhall	Francis Flood	Francis Flood
2002	Party Airs	Barry Geraghty	Dermot Weld
2003	Top Strategy	Gary Hutchinson	Ted Walsh
2004	Arch Rebel	Niall Madden (Note: amateur jockey)	Noel Meade
2005	Clear Riposte	David Casey	Willie Mullins
2006	Lounaos	Barry Geraghty	Eoin Griffin
2007	Won In The Dark	Michael Mooney	Sabrina Harty
2008	Lethal Weapon	Alan Crowe	Christy Roche
2009	Carlito Brigante	Davy Russell	Gordon Elliott
2010	Sailors Warn	Andrew McNamara	Edward O'Grady
2011	His Excellency	Davy Russell	Gordon Elliott
2012	Blood Cotil	Paul Townend	Willie Mullins
2013	Guitar Pete	Bryan Cooper	Dessie Hughes
2014	Fiscal Focus	Mikey Fogarty	Des McDonagh
2015	Apple's Jade	Johnny Burke	Willie Mullins
2016	Bapaume	Ruby Walsh	Willie Mullins
2017	Espoir D'Allen	Mark Walsh	Gavin Cromwell
2018	Rocky Blue	David Mullins	Thomas Mullins
2019	Aspire Tower	Rachael Blackmore	Henry de Bromhead
2020	Zanahiyr	Jack Kennedy	Gordon Elliott
2021	Fil Dor	Davy Russell	Gordon Elliott
2022	Lossiemouth	Danny Mullins	Willie Mullins
2023	Kala Conti	Danny Gilligan	Gordon Elliott
2024	Hello Neighbour	Keith Donoghue	Gavin Cromwell
2025	Narciso Has	Danny Mullins	Willie Mullins

== See also ==
- Horse racing in Ireland
- List of Irish National Hunt races
