= Galmoy Hurdle =

Hurdle horse race in Ireland

Galmoy Hurdle
2026
Home By The Lee	Staffordshire Knot	Gerri Colombe

Previous years
2025
Rocky's Diamond	Thedevilscoachman	Franciscan Rock
2024
Monkfish	Summerville Boy	Ashdale Bob
2023
Teahupoo	Summerville Boy	My Design
2021
Sams Profile	Diol Ker	Sixshooter

2020–2011
2020
Benie Des Dieux	Penhill	Killultagh Vic
2019
Presenting Percy	Bapaume	Killultagh Vic
2018
Presenting Percy	Augusta Kate	Diamond Cauchois
2017
Shaneshill	Apache Stronghold	Clondaw Warrior
2016
Alpha Des Obeaux	At Fishers Cross	Martello Tower
2015
Dedigout	Monksland	Zaidpour
2014
Mala Beach	Un Beau Matin	Jetson
2013
Bog Warrior	Zaidpour	Chicago Grey
2012
Zaidpour	Voler La Vedette	Chicago Grey
2011
Mourad	Moskova	Oscar Dan Dan

2010–2002
2010
War of Attrition	Powerstation	Jadanli
2009
Alpha Ridge	Whatuthink	Shakervilz
2008
Earth Magic	Sweet Kiln	Kazal
2007
Celestial Wave	Studmaster	Our Ben
2006
Emotional Moment	Strangely Brown	Jack High
2005
Emotional Moment	Homer Wells	Rosaker
2004
Rosaker	Yogi	Prince of Tara
2003
Satco Express	Rostropovich	Evening Scent
2002
Be My Belle	Boss Doyle	Sackville

The Galmoy Hurdle is a Grade 2 National Hunt hurdle race in Ireland. It is run at Gowran Park in January, over a distance of about 3 miles (4,828 metres) and during the race there are 13 flights of hurdles to be jumped. The race was first run in 2002 and was contested at Grade 3 level between 2003 and 2008.

The race is named in honour of the John Mulhern trained Galmoy, who won the Stayers' Hurdle in 1987 and 1988.

== Records ==
Most successful horse (2 wins):

- Emotional Moment – 2005, 2006
- Presenting Percy – 2018, 2019

Leading jockey (5 wins):

- Davy Russell – Alpha Ridge (2009), Bog Warrior (2013), Presenting Percy (2018, 2019), Teahupoo (2023)

Leading trainer (5 wins):

- Willie Mullins – Mourad (2011), Zaidpour (2012), Shaneshill (2017), Benie Des Dieux (2020), Monkfish (2024)

== Winners ==
Year	Winner	Age	Jockey	Trainer
2002	Be My Belle	6	Tom Treacy	Sean Treacy
2003	Satco Express	7	Charlie Swan	Dusty Sheehy
2004	Rosaker	7	Paul Carberry	Noel Meade
2005	Emotional Moment	8	Barry Geraghty	Tom Taaffe
2006	Emotional Moment	9	Barry Geraghty	Tom Taaffe
2007	Celestial Wave	7	Conor O'Dwyer	Adrian Maguire
2008	Earth Magic	8	Andrew McNamara	Michael Bowe
2009	Alpha Ridge	7	Davy Russell	Paul Nolan
2010	War Of Attrition	11	Niall Madden	Mouse Morris
2011	Mourad	6	Paul Townend	Willie Mullins
2012	Zaidpour	6	Ruby Walsh	Willie Mullins
2013	Bog Warrior	6	Davy Russell	Tony Martin
2014	Mala Beach	6	Robbie Colgan	Gordon Elliott
2015	Dedigout	9	Bryan Cooper	Tony Martin
2016	Alpha Des Obeaux	6	Bryan Cooper	Mouse Morris
2017	Shaneshill	8	Paul Townend	Willie Mullins
2018	Presenting Percy	7	Davy Russell	Patrick Kelly
2019	Presenting Percy	8	Davy Russell	Patrick Kelly
2020	Benie Des Dieux	9	Paul Townend	Willie Mullins
2021	Sams Profile	7	Philip Enright	Mouse Morris
2022	Royal Kahala	7	Kevin Sexton	Peter Fahey
2023	Teahupoo	6	Davy Russell	Gordon Elliott
2024	Monkfish	10	Paul Townend	Willie Mullins
2025	Rocky's Diamond	5	Shane Fitzgerald	Declan Queally
2026	Home By The Lee	11	JJ Slevin	Joseph O'Brien

== See also ==
- Horse racing in Ireland
- List of Irish National Hunt races
