= Fishery Lane Hurdle =

Hurdle horse race in Ireland

Fishery Lane Hurdle
2026
Love Me Tender	Bartholomew	Golden Handshake

Previous years
2025
Tir Og	Our Lucky Lady	Hopeful Hero
2024
Pinot Gris	Palamon	Wonleg
2023
Smooth Tom	Mayor's Walk	Golden Joy
2022
Brazil	Fil Dor	Prairie Dancer
2021
Teahupoo	Quilixios	Jeff Kidder

2020-2011
2020
Call Me Lyreen	Wolf Prince	Gars En Noir
2019
Surin	Gardens of Babylon	Quartz Du Rheu
2018
Espoir D'Allen	Mr Adjudicator	Mastermind
2017
Early Doors	Meri Devie	Delta Work
2016
Missy Tata	Slowmotion	Swamp Fox
2015
Gwencily Berbas	Petite Parisienne	Neverushacon
2014
Kitten Rock	Henry Higgins	Gerdago
2013
Diakali	Mr Fiftyone	Dalasiri
2012
Jezki	Un Beau Matin	Pageboy
2011
Unaccompanied	Sailors Warn	Lyreen Legend

2010-2006
2010
Alaivan	Son Amix	Leblon
2009
Torphichen	Arabella Boy	Ebadiyan
2008
River Liane	Beau Michael	Head Of The River
2007
Migmatite	Loup Du Saubouas	Merveilles
2006
Catch Me	Breathing Fire	Artist's Muse

The Fishery Lane Hurdle is a Grade 3 National Hunt hurdle race in Ireland which is open to horses aged four years. It is run at Naas over a distance of about 2 miles (3,218 metres), and it is scheduled to take place each year in November.

The race was first run in 2006, was awarded Listed status in 2007, then raised to Grade 3 in 2012. It was run as a Grade 2 race as a one-off in 2020.

== Records ==
Leading jockey (3 wins):

- Mark Walsh - Early Doors (2017), Espoir d'Allen (2018), Brazil (2022)

Leading trainer (4 wins):

- Edward O'Grady - Catch Me (2006), Torphichen (2009), Alaivan (2010), Kitten Rock (2014)
- Gordon Elliott - Miss Tata (2016), Surin (2019), Call Me Lyreen (2020), Teahupoo (2021)

== Winners ==
Year	Winner	Jockey	Trainer
2006	Catch Me	Barry Geraghty	Edward O'Grady
2007	Migmatite	David Casey	John E Kiely
2008	River Liane	Niall Madden	Thomas Cooper
2009	Torphichen	Andrew McNamara	Edward O'Grady
2010	Alaivan	Andrew McNamara	Edward O'Grady
2011	Unaccompanied	Paul Townend	Dermot Weld
2012	Jezki	Barry Geraghty	Jessica Harrington
2013	Diakali	Ruby Walsh	Willie Mullins
2014	Kitten Rock	Ruby Walsh	Edward O'Grady
2015	Gwencily Berbas	Adrian Heskin	Alan Fleming
2016	Missy Tata	Keith Donoghue	Gordon Elliott
2017	Early Doors	Mark Walsh	Joseph O'Brien
2018	Espoir d'Allen	Mark Walsh	Gavin Cromwell
2019	Surin	Luke Dempsey	Gordon Elliott
2020	Call Me Lyreen	Jack Kennedy	Gordon Elliott
2021	Teahupoo	Jack Kennedy	Gordon Elliott
2022	Brazil	Mark Walsh	Padraig Roche

== See also ==
- Horse racing in Ireland
- List of Irish National Hunt races
