= Cork E.B.F. Novice Hurdle =

Hurdle horse race in Ireland

Cork E.B.F. Novice Hurdle
2026
Roc Dino	Theflyingking	Too Hot To Trot

Previous years
2025
Tackletommywoowoo	Good Girl Kathleen	Cardcounter
2024
Oscars Brother	Paggane	Cast A Spell
2023
Solitary Man	What Path	Pinyon Jay
2022
Cool Survivor	Granny Lowrie	Glamorgan Duke
2021
Chicago Time	Ballywilliam Boy	Mr Josiey Wales

2020-2011
2020
Darrens Hope	Ragnar Lodbrok	Goodbye Someday
2019
Well Set Up	Doctor Duffy	Blazing Emily
2018
Robin De Carlow	Milliner	Rolanna
2017
Cracking Smart	Robin Des Foret	Fabulous Saga
2016
Blood Crazed Tiger	Screaming Rose	Garri Rua
2015
Moylisha Tim	Ben Button	Goonyella
2014
Martello Tower	Ask Vic	Elsie
2013
Lots Of Memories	Horendus Hulabaloo	Courtncatcher
2012
Our Vinnie	Rule The World	Busty Brown
2011
Sword Of Destiny	Farrells Fancy	Taraval

2010-2000
2010
Mount Helicon	Original Option	Tango Knight
2009
Premier Victory	Last Draw	Definitive Edge
2008
Alpha Ridge	Glenquest	The Bay Lad
2007
Liskennett	Major Finnegan	Signatory
2006
Footy Facts	Swiss Hall	Eternal Lady
2005
Laetitia	Mossbank	Outlaw Princess
2004
Asian Maze	Baily Breeze	Moscow City
2003
Alpha Rhythm	Darby Wall	What A Hussy
2002
Satco Express	Rockspring Hero	Collinstown
2001
Panchovillas Gleam	Tobeornotobe	More Doe
2000
Be My Royal	Trevino	Oggie Moran

The Cork E.B.F. Novice Hurdle is a Listed National Hunt novice hurdle race in Ireland which is open to horses aged four years or older. It is run at Cork over a distance of 3 miles (4,828 metres), and it is scheduled to take place each year in late October or early November. The race has been sponsored since 2014 by Paddy Power.

The race was first run in 2000 and was awarded Grade 3 status in 2008. It was downgraded to Listed status in 2016.

== Records ==
Most successful jockey (3 wins):

- Paul Townend - Robin de Carlow (2018), Darrens Hope (2020), Roc Dino (2026)

Most successful trainer (3 wins):

- Charles Byrnes– Laetitia (2005), Liskennett (2007), Our Vinnie (2012)
- Gordon Elliott - Blood Crazed Tiger (2016), Cracking Smart (2017), Cool Survivor (2022)
- Willie Mullins - Be My Royal (2000), Robin de Carlow (2018), Roc Dino (2026)

== Winners ==
Year	Winner	Age	Jockey	Trainer
2000	Be My Royal	6	Garrett Cotter	Willie Mullins
2001	Panchovillas Gleam	7	Charlie Swan	Dermot Day
2002	Satco Express	6	Charlie Swan	E Sheehy
2003	Alpha Rhythm	5	I J Power	Noel Meade
2004	Asian Maze	5	Ruby Walsh	Paddy Mullins
2005	Laetitia	5	Davy Russell	Charles Byrnes
2006	Footy Facts	6	Paul Carberry	Robert Tyner
2007	Liskennett	4	Niall Madden	Charles Byrnes
2008	Alpha Ridge	6	Alain Cawley	Paul Nolan
2009	Premier Victory	5	J L Cullen	Tom Hogan
2010	Mount Helicon	5	J L Cullen	Tom Hogan
2011	Sword Of Destiny	5	Davy Russell	Noel Meade
2012	Our Vinnie	5	Andrew Lynch	Charles Byrnes
2013	Lots Of Memories	6	S E Butler	Peter Fahey
2014	Martello Tower	6	Adrian Heskin	Margaret Mullins
2015	Moylisha Tim	5	JJ Slevin	Robert Rath
2016	Blood Crazed Tiger	5	David Mullins	Gordon Elliott
2017	Cracking Smart	5	Jack Kennedy	Gordon Elliott
2018	Robin de Carlow	5	Paul Townend	Willie Mullins
2019	Well Set Up	6	Ricky Doyle	Mark Fahey
2020	Darrens Hope	6	Paul Townend	Robert Murphy
2021	Chicago Time	6	Sean O'Keeffe	Matthew Tynan
2022	Cool Survivor	5	Jack Kennedy	Gordon Elliott
2023	Solitary Man	5	Darragh O'Keeffe	Enda Bolger
2024	Oscars Brother	6	Daniel King	Connor King
2025	Tackletommywoowoo	5	Sean O'Keeffe	Declan Queally
2026	Roc Dino	5	Paul Townend	Willie Mullins

== See also ==
- Horse racing in Ireland
- List of Irish National Hunt races
