= Leopardstown E.B.F. Mares Hurdle =

Hurdle horse race in Ireland

Leopardstown E.B.F. Mares Hurdle
2025
Wodhooh	Feet Of A Dancer	Dream On Baby

Previous years
2024
July Flower	Kala Conti	Jetara
2023
Jetara	Pink In The Park	Risk Belle
2022
Shewearsitwell	Queens Brook	My Design
2021
Royal Kahala	Heaven Help Us	Telmesomethinggirl

2020-2011
2020
Concertista	Minella Melody	Black Tears
2019
Stormy Ireland	Elfile	Black Tears
2018
Good Thyne Tara	Elimay	Limini
2017
Let's Dance	Forge Meadow	Dawn Shadow
2016
Let's Dance	Slowmotion	Solita
2015
Keppols Queen	Rock On The Moor	Morning Run
2014
Carrigmoorna Rock	Keppols Queen	Princess Leya
2013
Theatre Bird	Caoimhe's Delight	Jennies Jewel
2012
Zuzka	Burn And Turn	Glens Melody
2011
Our Girl Salley	Stephanie Kate	What A Charm

2010-2005
2010
Our Girl Salley	Shop Dj	Macville
2009
Voler La Vedette	No One Tells Me	Zarinava
2008
Give It Time	Aura About You	Shirley Casper
2007
Grangeclare Lark	Brave Betsy	Candy Girl
2006
Grangeclare Lark	Blazing Sky	La Marianne
2005
Celestial Wave	Brogella	Mrs Wallensky

The Leopardstown E.B.F. Mares Hurdle is a Grade 3 National Hunt hurdle race in Ireland which is open to mares aged four years or older. It is run at Leopardstown over a distance of 2 miles and four furlongs (4,023 metres) and during its running there are 10 flights of hurdles to be jumped. The race is scheduled to take place each year during the Christmas Festival at the end of December.

The race was first run in 2005, and was awarded Grade 3 status in 2011.

== Records ==
Most successful horse (2 wins):

- Grangeclare Lark – 2006, 2007
- Our Girl Salley - 2010, 2011
- Let's Dance- 2016, 2017

Leading jockey (5 wins):

- Paul Townend – Voler La Vedette (2009), Let's Dance (2017), Stormy Ireland (2019), Concertista (2020), Shewearsitwell (2022)

Leading trainer (7 wins):

- Willie Mullins - Zuzka (2012), Let's Dance (2016, 2017), Good Thyne Tara (2018), Stormy Ireland (2019), Concertista (2020), Shewearsitwell (2022)

== Winners ==
Year	Winner	Age	Jockey	Trainer
2005	Celestial Wave	5	Nina Carberry (Note: amateur jockey)	Adrian Maguire
2006	Grangeclare Lark	5	Roger Loughran	Dessie Hughes
2007	Grangeclare Lark	6	Roger Loughran	Dessie Hughes
2008	Give It Time	5	Andrew Leigh	Jessica Harrington
2009	Voler La Vedette	5	Paul Townend	Colm Murphy
2010	Our Girl Salley	5	Barry Geraghty	Prunella Dobbs
2011	Our Girl Salley	6	Barry Geraghty	Prunella Dobbs
2012	Zuzka	5	Patrick Mullins	Willie Mullins
2013	Theatre Bird	5	Bryan Cooper	Sean Thomas Doyle
2014	Carrigmoorna Rock	6	Phillip Enright	Robert Tyner
2015	Keppols Queen	7	Mark Bolger	Jessica Harrington
2016	Let's Dance	4	Ruby Walsh	Willie Mullins
2017	Let's Dance	5	Paul Townend	Willie Mullins
2018	Good Thyne Tara	8	David Mullins	Willie Mullins
2019	Stormy Ireland	5	Paul Townend	Willie Mullins
2020	Concertista	6	Paul Townend	Willie Mullins
2021	Royal Kahala	6	Kevin Sexton	Peter Fahey
2022	Shewearsitwell	7	Paul Townend	Willie Mullins
2023	Jetara	5	Jack Kennedy	Jessica Harrington
2024	July Flower	5	Rachael Blackmore	Henry de Bromhead
2025	Wodhooh	5	Jack Kennedy	Gordon Elliott

== See also ==
- Horse racing in Ireland
- List of Irish National Hunt races
