= Galway Hurdle =

Hurdle horse race in Ireland

Galway Hurdle
2026
Putapoundinthejar	Thisistheway	Gameball

Previous years
2025
Ndaawi	Helvic Dream	Casheldale Lad
2024
Nurburgring	Ndaawi	My Mate Mozzie
2023
Zarak The Brave	Jesse Evans	My Mate Mozzie
2022
Tudor City	Jesse Evans	Prairie Dancer
2021
Saldier	Milkwood	Cape Gentleman
2020
Aramon	Hearts Are Trumps	Petit Mouchoir
2019
Tudor City	Due Reward	Band of Outlaws
2018
Sharjah	Blazer	Leoncavallo
2017
Tigris River	Swamp Fox	Airlie Beach
2016
Clondaw Warrior	Hidden Cyclone	Princely Conn
2015
Quick Jack	Max Dynamite	Ted Veale
2014
Thomas Edison	Bayan	The Game Changer
2013
Missunited	Flaxen Flare	Make Your Mark
2012
Rebel Fitz	Cause of Causes	Captain Cee Bee
2011
Moon Dice	Fosters Cross	Dirar

2010-2001
2010
Overturn	Bahrain Storm	Dirar
2009
Bahrain Storm	Deutschland	Lucky Wish
2008
Indian Pace	Eagle's Pass	Northern Alliance
2007
Farmer Brown	Freeloader	Eagle's Pass
2006
Cuan Na Grai	Shandon Star	The Last Hurrah
2005
More Rainbows	Tiger Cry	Callow Lake
2004
Cloone River	Gemini Guest	Mirpour
2003
Sabadilla	Cloone River	Lafayette
2002
Say Again	Mutakarrim	Just Our Job
2001
Ansar	The Gatherer	Vivo

2000-1991
2000
Perugino Diamond	Darialann	Barba Papa
1999
Quinze	Dance So Suite	Vivo
1998
Black Queen	Tidjani	Shantarini
1997
Toast The Spreece	Kinnescash	Valley Erne
1996
Mystical City	Space Trucker	Just Little
1995
No Tag	Saibot	Skipo
1994
Oh So Grumpy	Royal Print	No Tag
1993
Camden Buzz	Mubadir	Native Portrait
1992
Natalies Fancy	Natural Ability	Mansion House
1991
Sagaman	Cheering News	Cock Cockburn

The Galway Hurdle is a National Hunt hurdle race in Ireland which is open to horses aged four years or older. It is run at Galway over a distance of about 2 miles (2 miles and 11 yards, or 3,229 metres), and during its running there are nine hurdles to be jumped. It is a handicap race, and it is scheduled to take place each year in late July or early August.

The event is held during the seven-day Galway Festival meeting. It was established in 1913, and the inaugural running was won by Red Damsel. For the first six years it was contested over 1½ miles. The race is now sponsored by Guinness.

== Records ==
Most successful horse since 1988 (2 wins):

- Tudor City (2019, 2022)

Leading jockey since 1988 (3 wins):

- Patrick Mullins - Sharjah (2018), Aramon (2020), Saldier (2021)

Leading trainer since 1988 (6 wins):

- Willie Mullins – Mystical City (1996), Clondaw Warrior (2016), Sharjah (2018), Aramon (2020), Saldier (2021), Zarak The Brave (2023)

== Winners since 1988 ==
- Weights given in stones and pounds

Year	Winner	Age	Weight	Jockey	Trainer
1988	Try a Brandy	6	09-07	Harry Rogers	Marty Dunne
1989	I'm Confident	5	09-07	Fran Flood (Note: amateur jockey)	M. McDonagh
1990	Athy Spirit	5	10–11	Tom Taaffe	Willie Fennin
1991	Sagaman	5	10–12	Philip Fenton	L. J. Codd
1992	Natalies Fancy	6	10-03	Jason Titley	Pat Kelly
1993	Camden Buzz	5	10–12	Charlie Swan	Paddy Mullins
1994	Oh So Grumpy	6	10-09	Mark Dwyer	Jessica Harrington
1995	No Tag	7	10–11	Jason Titley	Pat Kelly
1996	Mystical City	6	10-01	David Casey	Willie Mullins
1997	Toast the Spreece	5	10-09	Tony McCoy	Aidan O'Brien
1998	Black Queen	7	10-02	Shay Barry	John Kiely
1999	Quinze	6	11–12	Richard Dunwoody	Pat Hughes
2000	Perugino Diamond	4	09-08	Jim Culloty	Seamus O'Farrell
2001	Ansar	5	09-09	Paul Carberry	Dermot Weld
2002	Say Again	6	10-07	John Cullen	Paul Nolan
2003	Sabadilla	9	09-07	Pat Verling	Pat Verling
2004	Cloone River	8	10-07	John Cullen	Paul Nolan
2005	More Rainbows	5	09-10	Niall Madden	Noel Meade
2006	Cuan Na Grai	5	10-09	Paddy Flood	Paul Nolan
2007	Farmer Brown	6	10–11	Davy Russell	Pat Hughes
2008	Indian Pace	7	09-10	Paul Townend	John Kiely
2009	Bahrain Storm	6	10–12	Stephen Gray	Pat Flynn
2010	Overturn	6	11-06	Graham Lee	Donald McCain Jr
2011	Moon Dice	6	10-04	Tom Doyle	Paul Flynn
2012	Rebel Fitz	7	11-05	Davy Russell	Michael Winters
2013	Missunited	6	10-08	Robbie Power	Michael Winters
2014	Thomas Edison	7	10-06	Tony McCoy	Tony Martin
2015	Quick Jack	6	10-04	Denis O'Regan	Tony Martin
2016	Clondaw Warrior	9	11-05	Ruby Walsh	Willie Mullins
2017	Tigris River	6	10-09	Barry Geraghty	Joseph O'Brien
2018	Sharjah	5	11-07	Patrick Mullins	Willie Mullins
2019	Tudor City	7	11-00	Robbie Power	Tony Martin
2020	Aramon	7	11-10	Patrick Mullins	Willie Mullins
2021	Saldier	7	11-10	Patrick Mullins	Willie Mullins
2022	Tudor City	10	10-11	Liam McKenna	Tony Martin
2023	Zarak The Brave	4	11-05	Paul Townend	Willie Mullins
2024	Nurburgring	4	10-10	JJ Slevin	Joseph O'Brien
2025	Nadaawi	5	11-07	Jack Kennedy	Gordon Elliott
2026	Putapoundinthejar	6	10-02	Daniel King	Tony Martin

== Earlier winners ==
- 1913 – Red Damsel
- 1950 – Lady's Find
- 1951 – Wye Fly
- 1952 – Warrenscourt Lad
- 1953 – Prince of Devon
- 1954 – Cloudless Days
- 1955 – Antigue II
- 1956 – Ivy Green
- 1957 – Tymon Castle
- 1958 – Knight Errant
- 1959 – Cashel View
- 1960 – Commutering
- 1961 – Cynge Noir / Newgrove *
- 1962 – Tripacer
- 1963 – Snow Trix
- 1964 – Extra Stout
- 1965 – Ticonderoga
- 1966 – Warkey
- 1967 – Muir
- 1968 – Annalong
- 1969 – Bonne
- 1970 – Dictora
- 1971 – Highway View
- 1972 – Hardboy
- 1973 – Lesabelle
- 1974 – Just for Fun
- 1975 – Double Default / Spanner *
- 1976 – Negrada
- 1977 – Paddy Bouler
- 1978 – Prince Tammy
- 1979 – Hard Tarquin
- 1980 – Pearlstone
- 1981 – Double Wrapped
- 1982 – Pinch Hitter
- 1983 – Pinch Hitter
- 1984 – Tara Lee
- 1985 – Strathline
- 1986 – Rushmoor
- 1987 – Belsir

* The 1961 race was a dead-heat and has joint winners.
* There were two winners in 1975 as the race was split into separate divisions.

== See also ==
- Horse racing in Ireland
- List of Irish National Hunt races
