= Sporting Limerick 4yo Hurdle =

Irish National Hunt graded horse race

Sporting Limerick Hurdle
2021
Teahupoo	Quilixios	Slip Of The Tongue

Previous years
2020
Grand Roi	Wolf Prince	Indiana Jones
2019
Soviet Pimpernel	Gardens of Babylon	Global Equity
2018
Espoir D'Allen	Stormy Ireland	Saglawy
2017
Duca De Thaix	Us And Them	Prospectus
2016
Missy Tata	Cap D'aubois	Swamp Fox
2015
Dicosimo	Theophilus	Bamako Moriviere
2014
Kitten Rock	Max Dynamite	Gerdago
2013
Smashing	Carriganog	One Fine Day
2012
Love Rory	Umpact	Ballynacree
2011
Trifolium	Plan	Mister Carter

2010-2001
2010
Rory Anna	Sounds Of Jupiter	Big Game Hunter
2009
Rigour Back Bob	Der Spieler	Second Glance
2008
Quiscover Fontaine	Alpine Eagle	The Last Derby
2007
Lounaos	Quintana	Bahrain Storm
2006
Mister Hight	Rindoon	Artist's Muse
2005
Arch Rebel	Skyhawk	Liss Ard
2004
Emotional Article	Guest Artist	Montanel
2003
Dyrick Daybreak	Detention	Benjis Treasure
2002
King Carew	Private Ben	Millennium Lilly
2001
Risky Reef	Pittsburgh Phil	Best Wait

The Sporting Limerick 4yo Hurdle is a Grade 2 National Hunt novice hurdle race in Ireland which is open to horses aged four years. It is run at Limerick over a distance of 2 miles (3,218 metres), and it is scheduled to take place each year at the Christmas Festival.

The race was first run in 2001 as a valuable Conditions race. It was awarded Listed status in 2014, raised to Grade 3 in 2017 and has been a Grade 2 event since 2020.

== Winners ==
Year	Winner	Jockey	Trainer
2001	Risky Reef	Tommy Treacy	Andrew Lee
2002	King Carew	Mr R O Harding	Michael Hourigan
2003	Dyrick Daybreak	Timmy Murphy	David A Kiely
2004	Emotional Article	S M McGovern	Tom Taaffe
2005	Arch Rebel	Denis O'Regan	Noel Meade
2006	Mister Hight	Davy Condon	Willie Mullins
2007	Lounaos	Barry Geraghty	Eoin Griffin
2008	Quiscover Fontaine	Emmet Mullins	Willie Mullins
2009	Rigour Back Bob	S W Flanagan	Edward O'Grady
2010	Rory Anna	E F Power	John J Walsh
2011	Trifolium	Niall Madden	Charles Byrnes
2012	Love Rory	Mr J T McNamara	Enda Bolger
2013	Smashing	Paul Townend	Willie Mullins
2014	Kitten Rock	Mark Walsh	Edward O'Grady
2015	Dicosimo	Danny Mullins	Willie Mullins
2016	Missy Tata	Daryl Jacob	Gordon Elliott
2017	Duca De Thaix	J M Moore	Gordon Elliott
2018	Espoir d'Allen	Jody McGarvey	Gavin Cromwell
2019	Soviet Pimpernel	Kevin Sexton	Peter Fahey
2020	Grand Roi	Denis O'Regan	Gordon Elliott
2021	Teahupoo	Jordan Gainford	Gordon Elliott
2022	No Looking Back	Phillip Enright	Oliver McKiernan

== See also ==
- Horse racing in Ireland
- List of Irish National Hunt races
