= Spring Juvenile Hurdle =

Hurdle horse race in Ireland

Spring Juvenile Hurdle
2026
Narciso Has	Selma De Vary	Mange Tout

Previous years
2025
Hello Neighbour	Galileo Dame	Lady Vega Allen
2024
Kargese	Storm Heart	Majborough
2023
Gala Marceau	Lossiemouth	Tekao
2022
Vauban	Fil Dor	Il Etait Temps
2021
Quilixios	Saint Sam	Busselton

2020-2011
2020
A Wave Of The Sea	Wolf Prince	Cerberus
2019
Sir Erec	Gardens of Babylon	Surin
2018
Mr Adjudicator	Farclas	Grey Waters
2017
Mega Fortune	Bapaume	Dinaria Des Obeaux
2016
Footpad	Allblak Des Places	Let's Dance
2015
Petite Parisienne	Kalkir	Prussian Eagle
2014
Guitar Pete	Tiger Roll	Plinth
2013
Our Conor	Diakali	Ruacana
2012
Hisaabaat	Shadow Catcher	Countrywide Flame
2011
Unaccompanied	Sailors Warn	Fearless Falcon

2010-2001
2010
Pittoni	Cross Appeal	Big Game Hunter
2009
Jumbo Rio	Ebadiyan	Mourad
2008
Personal Column	Won In The Dark	Thousand Stars
2007
Convincing	Financial Reward	Island Life
2006
Mister Hight	Breathing Fire	First Row
2005
Strangely Brown	Barati	Arch Rebel
2004
Power Elite	Nopekan	Quel Doun
2003
Mutineer	Golden Cross	Kenilworth
2002
Newhall	Scolardy	Turtleback
2001
Lisaan	Hill Port	Rostropovich

2000-1994
2000
Sungazer	Topacio	Calico Lady
1999
Knife Edge	Golden Rule	Persian Isle
1998
Iron County Xmas	Khairabar	Loquacious
1997
Commanche Court	Hard News	Strategic Ploy
1996
Talina's Law	Shaunies Lady	Lady Arpel
1995
Notcomplainingbut	Sign Of Peace	Brief Reunion
1994
Shirley's Delight	Tropical Lake	Magic Feeling

The Spring Juvenile Hurdle is a Grade 1 National Hunt hurdle race in Ireland. It is run at Leopardstown Racecourse in February, over a distance of 2 miles. The race is restricted to four-year-old horses only and is usually contested by horses who go on to run in the Triumph Hurdle at the Cheltenham Festival.

The race was first run in 1994 as a Listed event, replacing the Le Coq Hardi Hurdle, a Grade 3 all-aged 2 mile Novice Hurdle. It was raised to Grade 3 in 1995, to Grade 2 in 2003 and has been a Grade 1 event since 2010.

== Records ==
Leading jockey since 1994 (3 wins):

- Paul Carberry – Shirley's Delight (1994), Sungazer (2000), Power Elite (2004)
- Barry Geraghty - Personal Column (2008), Guitar Pete (2014), A Wave of the Sea (2020)
- Paul Townend - Unaccompanied (2011), Mr Adjudicator (2018), Vauban (2022)
- Danny Mullins - Footpad (2016), Gala Marceau (2023), Kargese (2024)

Leading trainer since 1994 (8 wins):

- Willie Mullins - Mister Hight (2006), Petite Parisienne (2015), Footpad (2016), Mr Adjudicator (2018), Vauban (2022), Gala Marceau (2023), Kargese (2024), Narciso Has (2026)

== Winners ==
Year	Winner	Jockey	Trainer
1994	Shirley's Delight	Paul Carberry	Noel Meade
1995	Notcomplainingbut	Tommy Treacy	Paddy Mullins
1996	Talina's Law	Tom Treacy	Paddy Mullins
1997	Commanche Court	Norman Williamson	Ted Walsh
1998	Iron County Xmas	Norman Williamson	Dermot Weld
1999	Knife Edge	Tom Rudd	Michael O'Brien
2000	Sungazer	Paul Carberry	Noel Meade
2001	Lisaan	Barry Cash	William Durkan
2002	Newhall	Francis Flood	Francis Flood
2003	Mutineer	Kieran Kelly	Dessie Hughes
2004	Power Elite	Paul Carberry	Noel Meade
2005	Strangely Brown	David Casey	Eric McNamara
2006	Mister Hight	David Casey	Willie Mullins
2007	Convincing	E F Power	John Joseph Murphy
2008	Personal Column	Barry Geraghty	Jessica Harrington
2009	Jumbo Rio	Andrew McNamara	Edward O'Grady
2010	Pittoni	Davy Russell	Charles Byrnes
2011	Unaccompanied	Paul Townend	Dermot Weld
2012	Hisaabaat	Andrew Lynch	Dermot Weld
2013	Our Conor	Bryan Cooper	Dessie Hughes
2014	Guitar Pete	Barry Geraghty	Dessie Hughes
2015	Petite Parisienne	Bryan Cooper	Willie Mullins
2016	Footpad	Danny Mullins	Willie Mullins
2017	Mega Fortune	Davy Russell	Gordon Elliott
2018	Mr Adjudicator	Paul Townend	Willie Mullins
2019	Sir Erec	Mark Walsh	Joseph O'Brien
2020	A Wave of the Sea	Barry Geraghty	Joseph O'Brien
2021	Quilixios	Jack Kennedy	Gordon Elliott
2022	Vauban	Paul Townend	Willie Mullins
2023	Gala Marceau	Danny Mullins	Willie Mullins
2024	Kargese	Danny Mullins	Willie Mullins
2025	Hello Neighbour	Keith Donoghue	Gavin Cromwell
2026	Narciso Has	Mark Walsh	Willie Mullins

== See also ==
- Horse racing in Ireland
- List of Irish National Hunt races
