= Mares Champion Hurdle =

Hurdle horse race in Ireland

Mares Champion Hurdle
2026
Place De La Nation	Jade De Grugy	Wodhooh

Previous years
2025
Jade De Grugy	Gala Marceau	Brighterdaysahead
2024
Lossiemouth	Gala Marceau	Ashroe Diamond
2023
Echoes In Rain	Anna Bunina	Shewearsitwell
2022
Marie's Rock	Stormy Ireland	Epatante
2021
Stormy Ireland	Minella Melody	Concertista

2020-2011
2019
Benie Des Dieux	Stormy Ireland	Good Thyne Tara
2018
Benie Des Dieux	Augusta Kate	Apple's Jade
2017
Apple's Jade	Airlie Beach	Karalee
2016
Whiteout	Limini	Keppols Queen
2015
Annie Power	Analifet	Kalane
2014
Annie Power	Jennies Jewel	Katie T
2013
Glens Melody	Shadow Eile	Swincombe Flame
2012
Mae's Choice	Gorgeous Sixty	Lucia Bay
2011
Shop Dj	Shirley Casper	Golden Sunbird

2010-2004
2010
Tarla	Leblon	Alpine Glade
2009
Voler La Vedette	Shirley Casper	Handfull Of Euros
2008
Oscar Rebel	Serpentaria	Moskova
2007
Grangeclare Lark	Shuil Aris	Blazing Sky
2006
Brogella	Chicago Vic	Grangeclare Lark
2005
Blazing Liss	Mags Benefit	Greenhall Rambler
2004
Stashedaway	Greenhall Rambler	Aine Dubh

The Mares Champion Hurdle is a Grade 1 National Hunt hurdle race in Ireland which is open to mares aged four years or older. It is run at Punchestown Racecourse over a distance of about 2 miles and 4 furlongs (4,023 metres), and during its running there are twelve hurdles to be jumped. The race is scheduled to take place each year in late April or early May.

The race was first run in 2004. It was initially a Listed race, was awarded Grade 3 status in 2006, and then fast-tracked to Grade 1 in 2013. It was initially contested over 2 miles and 2 furlongs, and was increased to the present distance in 2017.

== Records ==
Most successful horse (2 wins):

- Annie Power – 2014, 2015
- Benie Des Dieux - 2018, 2019

Leading jockey (8 wins):

- Paul Townend – Tarla (2010), Glens Melody (2013), Whiteout (2016), Benie Des Dieux (2018, 2019), Echoes In Rain (2023), Lossiemouth (2024), Jade De Grugy (2025)

Leading trainer (12 wins):

- Willie Mullins - Tarla (2010), Glens Melody (2013), Annie Power (2014, 2015), Whiteout (2016), Benie Des Dieux (2018, 2019), Stormy Ireland (2021), Echoes In Rain (2023), Lossiemouth (2024), Jade De Grugy (2025), Place De La Nation (2026)

== Winners ==
Year	Winner	Age	Jockey	Trainer
2004	Stashedaway	7	I J Power	Michael O'Brien
2005	Blazing Liss	6	Davy Russell	John E Kiely
2006	Brogella	6	Ruby Walsh	Frances Crowley
2007	Grangeclare Lark	6	Roger Loughran (Note: amateur rider)	Dessie Hughes
2008	Oscar Rebel	6	Davy Russell	W J Burke
2009	Voler La Vedette	5	S W Flanagan	Colm Murphy
2010	Tarla	4	Paul Townend	Willie Mullins
2011	Shop Dj	6	Davy Russell	Peter Fahey
2012	Mae's Choice	6	Paul Carberry	Gordon Elliott
2013	Glens Melody	5	Paul Townend	Willie Mullins
2014	Annie Power	6	Ruby Walsh	Willie Mullins
2015	Annie Power	7	Ruby Walsh	Willie Mullins
2016	Whiteout	5	Paul Townend	Willie Mullins
2017	Apple's Jade	5	Bryan Cooper	Gordon Elliott
2018	Benie Des Dieux	7	Paul Townend	Willie Mullins
2019	Benie Des Dieux	8	Paul Townend	Willie Mullins
	no race 2020 (Note: The 2020 running was cancelled because of the COVID-19 pandemic in the Republic of Ireland)
2021	Stormy Ireland	7	Danny Mullins	Willie Mullins
2022	Marie's Rock	7	Nico de Boinville	Nicky Henderson
2023	Echoes In Rain	7	Paul Townend	Willie Mullins
2024	Lossiemouth	5	Paul Townend	Willie Mullins
2025	Jade De Grugy	6	Paul Townend	Willie Mullins
2026	Place De La Nation	5	Danny Mullins	Willie Mullins

== See also ==
- Horse racing in Ireland
- List of Irish National Hunt races
