= Anniversary 4-Y-O Juvenile Hurdle =

Hurdle horse race in Britain

- Class: Grade 1
- Location: Aintree Racecourse; Merseyside, England
- Race type: Hurdle race
- Sponsor: Jewson
- Website: Aintree

Race information
- Distance: 2m 209y (3,410 metres)
- Surface: Turf
- Track: Left-handed
- Qualification: Four-year-olds
- Weight: 11 st 0 lb Allowances; 7 lb for fillies
- Purse: £110,000 (2022); 1st: £61,897

Anniversary 4-Y-O Juvenile Hurdle
2026
Mange Tout	Selma De Vary	Indian River

Previous years
2025
Murcia	Live Conti	Puturhandstogether
2024
Sir Gino	Kargese	Kalif Du Berlais
2023
Zenta	Bo Zenith	Nusret
2022
Knight Salute	Pied Piper	Brazil
2021
Monmiral	Adagio	Fiveandtwenty

2020-2011
2019
Pentland Hills	Fakir D'Oudairies	Christopher Wood
2018
We Have A Dream	Gumball	Apple's Shakira
2017
Defi Du Seuil	Divin Bere	Bedrock
2016
Apple's Jade	Ivanovich Gorbatov	Azzuri
2015
All Yours	Devilment	Bristol De Mai
2014
Guitar Pete	Clarcam	Calipto
2013
L'unique	Runswick Royal	Irish Saint
2012
Grumeti	Countrywide Flame	Sadler's Risk
2011
Zarkandar	Kumbeshwar	Houblon Des Obeaux

2010-2001
2010
Orsippus	Barizan	Sanctuaire
2009
Walkon	Ski Sunday	Starluck
2008
Binocular	Celestial Halo	Harper Valley
2007
Katchit	Punjabi	Degas Art
2006
Detroit City	Premier Dane	Afsoun
2005
Faasel	Phar Bleu	Strangely Brown
2004
Al Eile	Made in Japan	My Will
2003
Le Duc	Spectroscope	Well Chief
2002
Quazar	Abbot	Newhall
2001
Bilboa	Azertyuiop	Armen

2000-1991
2000
Lord Brex	High Stakes	Perugino Diamond
1999
Hors La Loi	Afarad	Golden Rule
1998
Deep Water	Rainbow Frontier	Torn Silk
1997
Quakers Field	Far Dawn	Circus Star
1996
Zabadi	Our Kris	Danjing
1995
Stompin	Clifton Beat	Silver Wedge
1994
Tropical Lake	Kadastrof	Mysilv
1993
Titled Dancer	Her Honour	Nadjati
1992
Salwan	Staunch Friend	Absalom's Lady
1991
Montpelier Lad	Runway Romance	Native Mission

1990-1988
1990
Sybillin	Midfielder	Bally Rue
1989
Vayrua	Highland Bud	Bank View
1988
Royal Illusion	Combermere	Old Eros

The Anniversary 4-Y-O Juvenile Hurdle is a Grade 1 National Hunt hurdle race in Great Britain which is open to horses aged four years. It is run at Aintree over a distance of about 2 miles and 1 furlong (2 miles and 209 yards, or 3,410 metres), and during its running there are nine hurdles to be jumped. The race is for novice hurdlers, and it is scheduled to take place each year during the Grand National meeting in early April.

During the 1960s and early 1970s the race was called the Lancashire Hurdle, and it was subsequently known by several different sponsored titles. For a period it was classed at Grade 2 level, and it was promoted to Grade 1 status in 2005.

The Anniversary 4-Y-O Juvenile Hurdle usually features horses which ran previously in the Triumph Hurdle, and the last to win both events was Pentland Hills in 2019.

== Records ==
Leading jockey since 1970 (3 wins):

- Tony McCoy – Zabadi (1996), Hors La Loi III (1999), Binocular (2008)
- Robert Thornton – Katchit (2007), Walkon (2009), Grumeti (2012)

Leading trainer since 1970 (4 wins):

- Alan King – Katchit (2007), Walkon (2009), Grumeti (2012), L'Unique (2013)
- Paul Nicholls - Le Duc (2003), Zarkandar (2011), All Yours (2015), Monmiral (2021)
- Nicky Henderson - Binocular (2008), We Have A Dream (2018), Pentland Hills (2019), Sir Gino (2024)

== Winners since 1950 ==
- Separate divisions of the race indicated by (1) and (2).

Year	Winner	Jockey	Trainer
1950	Solar	T P Burns	P Beary
1951	Sir Ken	Tim Molony	Willie Stephenson
1952	French Flyer	Johnnie Gilbert	G Archibald
1953	Pintail	Jack Dowdeswell	Jack Bissill
1954	Baby Don	Tim Molony	Willie Stephenson
1955	Didoric	Rene Emery	T Farmer
1956	Rosati	Johnnie Gilbert	T Hanbury
1957	Rattler	Fred Winter	Ryan Price
1958	Malacca III	Fred Winter	Ryan Price
1959	Morning Coat	Derek Ancil	Derek Ancil
1960 (Note: The 1960 race was a dead-heat and has joint winners) (dh)	Clasping; Scarab	Paddy Farrell; Fred Winter	Charlie Hall; S C Banks
1961	Anzio	Bobby Beasley	Fulke Walwyn
1962	Imperator	Johnnie Gilbert	Jack Fawcus
1963	Running Rock	Frankie Carroll	Paddy Norris
1964	Crown Prince	Pat Taaffe	Tom Dreaper
1965	Eurotas	J Gallagher	D Quirke
1966 (1)	The Spaniard	George Milburn	Ken Oliver
1966 (2)	Chancer	Pat McCarron	Charlie Hall
1967	Chaou II	David Mould	Peter Cazalet
1968	Golden Duck	Brian Fletcher	M Kane
1969	Clever Scott	Brian Fletcher	C H Davies
1970	Tudor Dance	Jeff King	Bob Turnell
1971	True Luck	Terry Biddlecombe	Fred Rimell
1972	Be My Guest	David Mould	Jumbo Wilkinson
1973	Reclaim	Doug Barrott	Josh Gifford
1974	Perama	David Mould	Harry Thomson Jones
1975	Wovoka	Tommy Stack	I Dudgeon
1976	Cooch Behar	L O'Donnell	Christy Kinane
1977	Decent Fellow	Richard Linley	Toby Balding
1978	Beparoejojo	Dessie Hughes	Jim Bolger
1979	Pollardstown	Philip Blacker	Stan Mellor
1980	Starfen	Jonjo O'Neill	Peter Easterby
1981	Broadsword	Peter Scudamore	David Nicholson
1982	Prince Bless	Martin O'Halloran	Dina Smith
1983	Benfen	Alan Brown	Peter Easterby
1984	Afzal	Graham McCourt	Reg Hollinshead
1985	Humberside Lady	Mark Dwyer	Geoff Huffer
1986	Dark Raven	Tommy Carmody	Dermot Weld
1987	Aldino	Simon Sherwood	Oliver Sherwood
1988	Royal Illusion	Micky Hammond	George M. Moore
1989	Vayrua	Mark Perrett	Guy Harwood
1990	Sybillin	Derek Byrne	Jimmy FitzGerald
1991	Montpelier Lad	Neale Doughty	Gordon W. Richards
1992	Salwan	Robert Stronge	Peter Bevan
1993	Titled Dancer	John Shortt	Jimmy Coogan
1994	Tropical Lake	Kevin O'Brien	Michael Hourigan
1995	Stompin	Jamie Osborne	Henrietta Knight
1996	Zabadi	Tony McCoy	David Nicholson
1997	Quakers Field	Dean Gallagher	Gary L. Moore
1998	Deep Water	Russ Garritty	Micky Hammond
1999	Hors La Loi III	Tony McCoy	Martin Pipe
2000	Lord Brex	Richard Johnson	Philip Hobbs
2001	Bilboa	Thierry Doumen	François Doumen
2002	Quazar	Tony Dobbin	Jonjo O'Neill
2003	Le Duc	Ruby Walsh	Paul Nicholls
2004	Al Eile	Timmy Murphy	John Queally
2005	Faasel	Tony Dobbin	Nicky Richards
2006	Detroit City	Richard Johnson	Philip Hobbs
2007	Katchit	Robert Thornton	Alan King
2008	Binocular	Tony McCoy	Nicky Henderson
2009	Walkon	Robert Thornton	Alan King
2010	Orsippus	Davy Condon	Michael Smith
2011	Zarkandar	Ruby Walsh	Paul Nicholls
2012	Grumeti	Robert Thornton	Alan King
2013	L'Unique	Wayne Hutchinson	Alan King
2014	Guitar Pete	Paul Carberry	Dessie Hughes
2015	All Yours	Sam Twiston-Davies	Paul Nicholls
2016	Apple's Jade	Bryan Cooper	Willie Mullins
2017	Defi du Seuil	Barry Geraghty	Philip Hobbs
2018	We Have A Dream	Daryl Jacob	Nicky Henderson
2019	Pentland Hills	Nico de Boinville	Nicky Henderson
	no race 2020 (Note: The 2020 running was cancelled because of the COVID-19 pandemic in the United Kingdom)
2021	Monmiral	Harry Cobden	Paul Nicholls
2022	Knight Salute (Note: Pied Piper dead-heated for first place in 2022 but was placed second after a stewards' enquiry)	Paddy Brennan	Milton Harris
2023	Zenta	Mark Walsh	Willie Mullins
2024	Sir Gino	Nico de Boinville	Nicky Henderson
2025	Murcia	Paul Townend	Willie Mullins
2026	Mange Tout	Jack Kennedy	Gordon Elliott

== See also ==
- Horse racing in Great Britain
- List of British National Hunt races
