= Golden Cygnet Novice Hurdle =

Hurdle horse race in Ireland

Golden Cygnet Novice Hurdle
2026
Doctor Steinberg	Kazansky	Love Me Tender

Previous years
2025
Final Demand	Wingmen	Mozzies Sister
2024
Dancing City	Predators Gold	Jetara
2023
Good Land	Absolute Notions	Sandor Clegane
2022
Minella Cocooner	Minella Crooner	Hollow Games
2021
Gaillard Du Mesnil	Gentlemansgame	Stattler

2020-2011
2020
Latest Exhibition	Cobbler's Way	Longhouse Poet
2019
Commander Of Fleet	Rhinestone	Gallant John Joe
2018
Tower Bridge	Jetz	Carter Mckay
2017
Let's Dance	Kemboy	Joey Sasa
2016
A Toi Phil	Acapella Bourgeois	Woodland Opera
2015
Outlander	Martello Tower	Killultagh Vic
2014
Sure Reef	Moonshine Lad	Gilt Shadow
2013
Pont Alexandre	Sizing Gold	Our Vinnie
2012
Boston Bob	Lyreen Legend	Make Your Mark
2011
Hidden Cyclone	Ballyhaunis	Si C'etait Vrai

2010-2001
2010
Coole River	Quel Esprit	American Job
2009
Roberto Goldback	Weapon's Amnesty	Oscar Dan Dan
2008
Liskennett	Siegemaster	Our Bob
2007
Kazal	Aitmatov	Foligold
2006
Nicanor	Travino	Finger Onthe Pulse
2005
Washington Lad	Asian Maze	Arteea
2004
Watson Lake	Away Home	Kildare
2003
Solerina	Moore's Law	Ashstorm
2002
Pietro Vannucci	Native Jack	Canary Wharf
2001
Big-And-Bold	For Paddy's Day	Copernicus

2000-1999
2000
Monifeth Man	Kirmar	Vanilla Man
1999
Annie Cares	Mary's Manna	Star Service

The Golden Cygnet Novice Hurdle is a Grade 1 National Hunt novice hurdle race in Ireland which is for horses aged five years or older. It is run at Leopardstown over a distance of about 2 miles and 6 furlongs (4,426 metres). The race is scheduled to take place each year in late January or early February.

The race was first run in 1999 and is named in honour of Golden Cygnet, a racehorse trained by Edward O'Grady who was fatally injured while racing in 1978. It was awarded Grade 3 status in 2003 and then raised to Grade 2 in 2008. Since 2016 the race has been sponsored and run as the Nathaniel Lacy and Partners Solicitors Novice Hurdle. Prior to 2018 it was run over 2 miles and 4 furlongs, and in 2018 it was extended to its present distance and upgraded to Grade 1 status as part of the new Dublin Racing Festival.

== Records ==
Leading jockey since 1999 (4 wins):

- Ruby Walsh – Boston Bob (2012), Pont Alexandre (2013), Sure Reef (2014), Let's Dance (2017)
- Paul Townend - Outlander (2015), Gaillard Du Mesnil (2021), Final Demand (2025), Doctor Steinberg (2026)

Leading trainer since 1999 (11 wins):

- Willie Mullins - Boston Bob (2012), Pont Alexandre (2013), Sure Reef (2014), Outlander (2015), A Toi Phil (2016), Let's Dance (2017), Gaillard Du Mesnil (2021), Minella Cocooner (2022), Dancing City (2024), Final Demand (2025), Doctor Steinberg (2026)

== Winners ==
Year	Winner	Age	Jockey	Trainer
1999	Annie Cares	7	Charlie Swan	W F Treacy
2000	Monifeth Man	5	Tony McCoy	Mouse Morris
2001	Big-And-Bold	5	Conor O'Dwyer	Ger Lyons
2002	Pietro Vannucci	6	Paul Carberry	Noel Meade
2003	Solerina	6	Paul Carberry	James Bowe
2004	Watson Lake	6	I J Power	Noel Meade
2005	Washington Lad	5	Tony McCoy	P A Fahy
2006	Nicanor	5	Paul Carberry	Noel Meade
2007	Kazal	6	Barry Geraghty	Eoin Griffin
2008	Liskennett	5	Niall Madden	Charles Byrnes
2009	Roberto Goldback	7	Barry Geraghty	Jessica Harrington
2010	Coole River	6	Barry Geraghty	Jessica Harrington
2011	Hidden Cyclone	6	Andrew McNamara	John Joseph Hanlon
2012	Boston Bob	7	Ruby Walsh	Willie Mullins
2013	Pont Alexandre	5	Ruby Walsh	Willie Mullins
2014	Sure Reef	5	Ruby Walsh	Willie Mullins
2015	Outlander	7	Paul Townend	Willie Mullins
2016	A Toi Phil	6	Bryan Cooper	Willie Mullins
2017	Let's Dance	5	Ruby Walsh	Willie Mullins
2018	Tower Bridge	5	JJ Slevin	Joseph O'Brien
2019	Commander of Fleet	5	Jack Kennedy	Gordon Elliott
2020	Latest Exhibition	7	Bryan Cooper	Paul Nolan
2021	Gaillard Du Mesnil	5	Paul Townend	Willie Mullins
2022	Minella Cocooner	6	Danny Mullins	Willie Mullins
2023	Good Land	7	Michael O'Sullivan	Barry Connell
2024	Dancing City	7	Danny Mullins	Willie Mullins
2025	Final Demand	6	Paul Townend	Willie Mullins
2026	Doctor Steinberg	6	Paul Townend	Willie Mullins

== See also ==
- Horse racing in Ireland
- List of Irish National Hunt races
