= Christmas Hurdle (Ireland) =

Hurdle horse race in Ireland

Christmas Hurdle (Ireland)
2025
Teahupoo	Bob Olinger	Ballyburn

Previous years
2024
Home By The Lee	Bob Olinger	Rocky's Diamond
2023
Irish Point	Asterion Forlonge	Ballyadam
2022
Home by the Lee	Ashdale Bob	Meet And Greet
2021
Klassical Dream	Flooring Porter	Burning Victory

2020–2011
2020
Flooring Porter	The Storyteller	Sire Du Berlais
2019
Apple's Jade	Unowhatimeanharry	Penhill
2018
Apple's Jade	Early Doors	Bapaume
2017
Apple's Jade	Supasundae	Bapaume
2016
Vroum Vroum Mag	Clondaw Warrior	Snow Falcon
2015
Prince of Scars	Alpha Des Obeaux	Martello Tower
2014
Lieutenant Colonel	Jetson	Monksland
2013
Zaidpour	Rule The World	Mala Beach
2012
Monksland	Zaidpour	So Young
2011
Voler La Vedette	Mourad	Shakervilz

2010–2001
2010
Mourad	Powerstation	Rigour Back Bob
2009
Powerstation	Oscar Dan Dan	Noble Prince
2008
Catch Me	Whatuthink	Beau Michael
2007
Sweet Kiln	Sonnyanjoe	Adamant Approach
2006
Celestial Wave	Sweet Kiln	Strangely Brown
2005
Rosaker	Emotional Moment	Strangely Brown
2004
Emotional Moment	Yogi	Macs Gildoran
2003
Sacundai	Be My Belle	Rostropovich
2002
Limestone Lad	Boss Doyle	Bannow Bay
2001
Bannow Bay	Limestone Lad	Boss Doyle

2000–1996
2000
Bannow Bay	Slaney Native	Boss Doyle
1999
Limestone Lad	Boss Doyle	Spirit Dancer
1998
Commanche Court	Miltonfield	Tarthooth
1997
Nocksky	Cockney Lad	Antapoura
1996
What A Question	Antapoura	Rathgibbon

The Christmas Hurdle is Grade 1 National Hunt hurdle race in Ireland. It is run at Leopardstown Racecourse in December, over a distance of 3 miles (4,828 metres) and during its running there are 12 flights of hurdles to be jumped.

The race is one of the feature races of Leopardstown's Christmas Festival. Prior to 2013 it carried Grade 2 status. The 2019 race was run as the Frank Ward Memorial Hurdle. Since 2022 the race has been run as the Jack De Bromhead Christmas Hurdle.

== Records ==
Most successful horse (3 wins):

- Apple's Jade – (2017, 2018, 2019)

Leading jockey (4 wins):

- Jack Kennedy – Apple's Jade (2018, 2019), Irish Point (2023), Teahupoo (2025)

Leading trainer (6 wins):

- Gordon Elliott – Prince of Scars (2015), Apple's Jade (2017, 2018, 2019), Irish Point (2023), Teahupoo (2025)

== Recent winners ==
Year	Winner	Jockey	Trainer
1996	What A Question	Conor O'Dwyer	Mouse Morris
1997	Nocksky	Stephen Craine	Liam Browne
1998	Commanche Court	Ruby Walsh	Ted Walsh
1999	Limestone Lad	Shane McGovern	Michael Bowe
2000	Bannow Bay	Charlie Swan	Christy Roche
2001	Bannow Bay	Charlie Swan	Christy Roche
2002	Limestone Lad	Paul Carberry	James Bowe
2003	Sacundai	Barry Geraghty	Edward O'Grady
2004	Emotional Moment	Barry Geraghty	Tom Taaffe
2005	Rosaker	Paul Carberry	Noel Meade
2006	Celestial Wave	Timmy Murphy	Adrian Maguire
2007	Sweet Kiln	Tom Doyle	Michael Bowe
2008	Catch Me	Andrew McNamara	Edward O'Grady
2009	Powerstation	Andrew McNamara	Eamonn O'Connell
2010	Mourad	Paul Townend	Willie Mullins
2011	Voler la Vedette	Andrew Lynch	Colm Murphy
2012	Monksland	Paul Carberry	Noel Meade
2013	Zaidpour	Ruby Walsh	Willie Mullins
2014	Lieutenant Colonel	Bryan Cooper	Sandra Hughes
2015	Prince of Scars	Davy Russell	Gordon Elliott
2016	Vroum Vroum Mag	Ruby Walsh	Willie Mullins
2017	Apple's Jade	Davy Russell	Gordon Elliott
2018	Apple's Jade	Jack Kennedy	Gordon Elliott
2019	Apple's Jade	Jack Kennedy	Gordon Elliott
2020	Flooring Porter	Jonathan Moore	Gavin Cromwell
2021	Klassical Dream	Paul Townend	Willie Mullins
2022	Home by the Lee	JJ Slevin	Joseph O'Brien
2023	Irish Point	Jack Kennedy	Gordon Elliott
2024	Home by the Lee	JJ Slevin	Joseph O'Brien
2025	Teahupoo	Jack Kennedy	Gordon Elliott

== See also ==
- Horse racing in Ireland
- List of Irish National Hunt races
