= Cuan Na Grai =

Irish-bred Thoroughbred racehorse

- Sire: Erins Isle
- Dam: Volnost
- Damsire: Lyphard
- Sex: Gelding
- Foaled: 2001
- Country: Ireland
- Colour: Bay
- Breeder: D H W Dobson
- Owner: John Brennan
- Trainer: Paul Nolan
- Record: 19: 6-6-1
- Earnings: £138,361

Major wins
- Galway Hurdle (2006)
- Last updated on June 30, 2009

Cuan Na Grai (born 27 May 2001) is an Irish thoroughbred racehorse whose hurdling career was highlighted in 2006 when he won the Galway Hurdle at the Galway Festival. By Erins Isle and out of Volnost, the eight-year-old is owned by John Brennan and trained by Paul Nolan in Enniscorthy, County Wexford, Ireland. His name has several meanings in Irish but translates as Stud Bay in the eyes of his owner.

Cuan Na Grai featured in the 2010 Liz Mermin documentary 'Horses', which followed a year in the life of 3 horses at Paul Nolan's Stable, also including Joncol and Ardalan.
