= Champion Four Year Old Hurdle =

Hurdle horse race in Ireland

- Class: Grade 1
- Location: Punchestown; County Kildare, Ireland
- Race type: Hurdle race
- Sponsor: Ballymore Group
- Website: Punchestown

Race information
- Distance: 2 miles (3,219 metres)
- Surface: Turf
- Track: Right-handed
- Qualification: Four-year-olds
- Weight: 11 st 2 lb Allowances; 7 lb for fillies
- Purse: €100,000 (2021); 1st: €59,000

AES Champion Four Year Old Hurdle
2026
Saratoga	Bartholomew	Macho Man

Previous years
2025
Lulamba	Poniros	Hello Neighbour
2024
Kargese	Bottler'secret	Nurburgring
2023
Lossiemouth	Zarak The Brave	Gala Marceau
2022
Vauban	Fil Dor	Hms Seahorse
2021
Jeff Kidder	Zanahiyr	Haut En Couleurs

2020-2011
2019
Fusil Raffles	Fakir D'Oudairies	French Made
2018
Saldier	Mr Adjudicator	Saglawy
2017
Bapaume	Landofhopeandglory	Meri Devie
2016
Apple's Jade	Let's Dance	Ivanovich Gorbatov
2015
Petite Parisienne	Buiseness Sivola	Thunder Zone
2014
Abbyssial	Plinth	Fox Norton
2013
Diakali	Blood Cotil	Dogora
2012
Hisaabaat	Ut De Sivola	Wingtips
2011
Grandouet	Kumbeshwar	Twinlight

2010-2003
2010
Barizan	Carlito Brigante	Loch Long
2009
Jumbo Rio	Mourad	The Fist Of God
2008
Won In The Dark	Indian Spring	Paco Jack
2007
Punjabi	Financial Reward	Bahrain Storm
2006
Quatre Heures	Artist's Muse	Breathing Fire
2005
United	Strangely Brown	Akilak
2004
Cherub	Made In Japan	Essex
2003
Sporazene	Spectroscope	Golden Cross

The Champion Four Year Old Hurdle is a Grade 1 National Hunt hurdle race in Ireland which is open to horses aged four years. It is run at Punchestown over a distance of about 2 miles (3,219 metres), and during its running there are nine hurdles to be jumped. The race is for novice hurdlers, and it is scheduled to take place each year during the Punchestown Festival in late April or early May. The race is currently sponsored by the Ballymore Group

The field usually includes horses which ran previously in the Triumph Hurdle at Cheltenham, and the last to win both events was Lossiemouth in 2023.

== Records ==
Leading jockey since 1980 (5 wins):

- Ruby Walsh - Holy Orders (2001), Sporazene (2003), Diakali (2013), Abbyssial (2014), Bapaume (2017)

Leading trainer since 1980 (11 wins):

- Willie Mullins - Holy Order (2001), Quatre Heures (2006), Diakali (2013), Abbyssial (2014), Petite Parisienne (2015), Apple's Jade (2016), Bapaume (2017), Saldier (2018), Vauban (2022), Lossiemouth (2023), Kargese (2024)

== Winners since 1980 ==
Year	Winner	Jockey	Trainer
1980	Pearlstone	Sean Treacy	Paddy Mullins
1981	Tie Anchor	Tom Morgan	Paddy Prendergast, Jr.
1982	Bustineto	Niall Madden	Mick O'Toole
1983	Grateful Heir	Dermot Browne (Note: amateur jockey)	Liam Browne
1984	Clarinbridge	Brian Nolan	Jim Bolger
1985	Atherstone	Pat Leech	Noel Meade
1986	Derrymore Boy	Tony Mullins	Paddy Mullins
1987	Grabel	Tony Mullins	Paddy Mullins
1988	Allen's Mistake	Brendan Sheridan	Dermot Weld
1989	Royal Derbi	Graham McCourt	Neville Callaghan
1990	Orbis	Tommy Carmody	Jim Bolger
1991	Mounamara	Tommy Carmody	Paddy Mullins
1992	Staunch Friend	Steve Smith Eccles	Mark Tompkins
1993	Shawiya	Charlie Swan	Michael O'Brien
1994	Glenstal Flagship	Charlie Swan	Aidan O'Brien
1995	Shaihar	Kevin O'Brien	Michael O'Brien
1996	Shaunies Lady	Tony McCoy	Aidan O'Brien
1997	Grimes	Conor O'Dwyer	Christy Roche
1998	Zafarabad	Richard Johnson	David Nicholson
1999	Katarino	Mick Fitzgerald	Nicky Henderson
2000	Topacio	Charlie Swan	Pat Hughes
2001	Holy Orders (Note: The 2001 running took place at Fairyhouse)	Ruby Walsh	Willie Mullins
2002	Quazar	Tony Dobbin	Jonjo O'Neill
2003	Sporazene	Ruby Walsh	Paul Nicholls
2004	Cherub	Tony Dobbin	Jonjo O'Neill
2005	United	Leighton Aspell	Lucy Wadham
2006	Quatre Heures	Mick Fitzgerald	Willie Mullins
2007	Punjabi	Mick Fitzgerald	Nicky Henderson
2008	Won in the Dark	Davy Russell	Sabrina Harty
2009	Jumbo Rio	Andrew McNamara	Edward O'Grady
2010	Barizan	Jason Maguire	Evan Williams
2011	Grandouet	Barry Geraghty	Nicky Henderson
2012	Hisaabaat	Andrew Lynch	Dermot Weld
2013	Diakali	Ruby Walsh	Willie Mullins
2014	Abbyssial	Ruby Walsh	Willie Mullins
2015	Petite Parisienne	Bryan Cooper	Willie Mullins
2016	Apple's Jade	Bryan Cooper	Willie Mullins
2017	Bapaume	Ruby Walsh	Willie Mullins
2018	Saldier	Robbie Power	Willie Mullins
2019	Fusil Raffles	Daryl Jacob	Nicky Henderson
	no race 2020 (Note: The 2020 running was cancelled because of the COVID-19 pandemic in the Republic of Ireland)
2021	Jeff Kidder	Sean Flanagan	Noel Meade
2022	Vauban	Paul Townend	Willie Mullins
2023	Lossiemouth	Paul Townend	Willie Mullins
2024	Kargese	Paul Townend	Willie Mullins
2025	Lulamba	James Bowen	Nicky Henderson
2026	Saratoga	Mark Walsh	Padraig Roche

== See also ==
- Horse racing in Ireland
- List of Irish National Hunt races
