= Fred Winter Juvenile Handicap Hurdle =

Hurdle horse race in Britain

- Class: Premier Handicap
- Location: Cheltenham Racecourse; Cheltenham, England
- Inaugurated: 2005
- Race type: Hurdle race
- Sponsor: Hallgarten and Novum Wines
- Website: Cheltenham

Race information
- Distance: 2m 87y (3,298 metres)
- Surface: Turf
- Track: Left-handed
- Qualification: Four-year-olds
- Weight: Handicap
- Purse: £80,000 (2025); 1st: £45,016

Fred Winter Juvenile Handicap Hurdle
2026
Saratoga	Winston Junior	Klycot

Previous years
2025
Puturhandstogether	Robbies Rock	Liam Swagger
2024
Lark In The Mornin	Eagles Reign	Ndaawi
2023
Jazzy Matty	Byker	Risk Belle
2022
Brazil	Gaelic Warrior	Bell Ex One
2021
Jeff Kidder	Saint Sam	Elham Valley

2020-2011
2020
Aramax	Night Edition	Saint D'Oroux
2019
Band of Outlaws	Coko Beach	Ciel De Neige
2018
Veneer Of Charm	Style De Garde	Nube Negra
2017
Flying Tiger	Divin Bere	Nietzsche
2016
Diego Du Charmil	Romain De Senam	Coo Star Sivola
2015
Qualando	Bouvreuil	The Saint James
2014
Hawk High	Katgary	Orgilgo Bay
2013
Flaxen Flare	Caid Du Berlais	Ptit Zig
2012
Une Artiste	Edeymi	Vendor
2011
What A Charm	Kumbeshwar	Dhaafer

2010-2005
2010
Sanctuaire	Notus De La Tour	Orsippus
2009
Silk Affair	Ski Sunday	Saticon
2008
Crack Away Jack	Ashkazar	Grand Schlem
2007
Gaspara	Altilhar	Laustra Bad

The Fred Winter Juvenile Handicap Hurdle, known for sponsorship purposes as the Hallgarten and Novum Wines Juvenile Handicap Hurdle, is a Premier Handicap National Hunt hurdle race in Great Britain which is open to horses aged four years. It is run on the Old Course at Cheltenham over a distance of about 2 miles and ½ furlong (2 miles and 87 yards, or 3,298 metres), and during its running there are eight hurdles to be jumped. It is a handicap race for juvenile hurdlers, and it is scheduled to take place each year during the Cheltenham Festival in March.

The event is named in memory of Fred Winter (1926–2004), who was successful as both a jockey and a trainer in National Hunt racing. Winter's record at the Cheltenham Festival included seventeen victories as a jockey, and twenty-eight as a trainer.

The Fred Winter Juvenile Hurdle was one of several new races introduced at the Festival when a fourth day was added to the meeting in 2005. It was initially classed at Listed level, and it was promoted to Grade 3 status in 2009. The race was re-classified as a Premier Handicap from the 2023 running when Grade 3 status was renamed by the British Horseracing Authority.

== Records ==
Leading jockey (4 wins):

- Mark Walsh - Aramax (2020), Brazil (2022), Puturhandstogether (2025), Saratoga (2026)

Leading trainer (4 wins):

- Gordon Elliott - Flaxen Flare (2013), Veneer of Charm (2018), Aramax (2020), Jazzy Matty (2023)

== Winners ==
- Weights given in stones and pounds.

Year	Winner	Weight	Jockey	Trainer
2005	Dabiroun	11-04	Nina Carberry (Note: amateur jockey)	Paul Nolan
2006	Shamayoun	11-03	Paddy Brennan	Charles Egerton
2007	Gaspara	10–11	Andrew Glassonbury	David Pipe
2008	Crack Away Jack	11–10	Paul Carberry	Emma Lavelle
2009	Silk Affair	10-04	Tom O'Brien	Mick Quinlan
2010	Sanctuaire	11-02	Ruby Walsh	Paul Nicholls
2011	What A Charm	10-06	Paul Townend	Arthur Moore
2012	Une Artiste	10–13	Jeremiah McGrath	Nicky Henderson
2013	Flaxen Flare	10-07	Davy Condon	Gordon Elliott
2014	Hawk High	11-01	Brian Hughes	Tim Easterby
2015	Qualando	11-00	Nick Scholfield	Paul Nicholls
2016	Diego du Charmil	11-01	Sam Twiston-Davies	Paul Nicholls
2017	Flying Tiger	11-05	Richard Johnson	Nick Williams
2018	Veneer of Charm	11-00	Jack Kennedy	Gordon Elliott
2019	Band of Outlaws	11-08	JJ Slevin	Joseph O'Brien
2020	Aramax	11-08	Mark Walsh	Gordon Elliott
2021	Jeff Kidder	10-08	Sean Flanagan	Noel Meade
2022	Brazil	11-09	Mark Walsh	Padraig Roche
2023	Jazzy Matty	10-06	Michael O'Sullivan	Gordon Elliott
2024	Lark In The Mornin	11-00	JJ Slevin	Joseph O'Brien
2025	Puturhandstogether	11-06	Mark Walsh	Joseph O'Brien
2026	Saratoga	11-06	Mark Walsh	Padraig Roche

== See also ==
- Horse racing in Great Britain
- List of British National Hunt races
