= Aine O'Connor =

Irish jockey

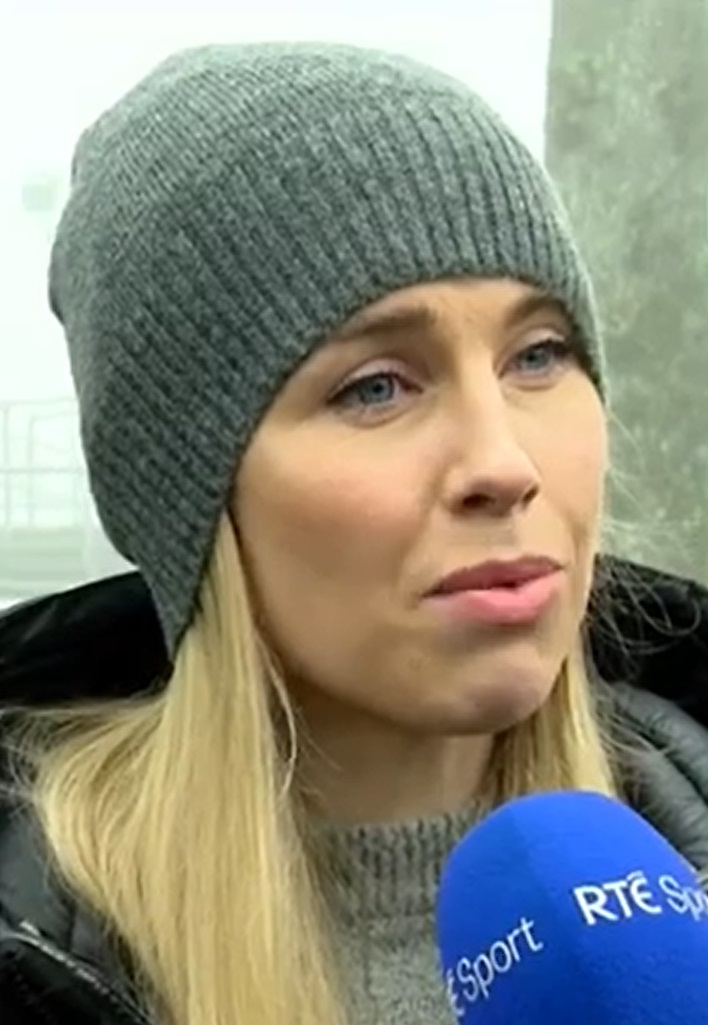
- O'Connor in 2020

Personal information
- Nationality: Irish
- Born: County Limerick
- Occupation: Jockey
- Spouse: Niall Madden (m. 2022)

Horse racing career
- Sport: Horse racing

Aine O'Connor is an Irish jockey.

== Early life ==
The youngest of four girls from Askeaton in County Limerick, she started riding at twelve years-old and was also a keen swimmer as a youngster. She has worked for Equuip, the education and training department of Horse Racing Ireland and for RACE recruiting young people to trainee jockey courses and junior academies.

== Career ==
O’Connor made her point-to-point debut aboard Hordargo for Seamus Braddish at Dromahane in 2009. She rode Supersede to victory at Templemore in April 2012. She won the Class 2 Clarke Chase at Uttoxeter Harry Fry, and the 2017 Ladies National aboard Coldstonesober. In 2018, she rode American in the Ladbrokes Trophy at Newbury. That year, she won a Hunters Chase at Listowel on On The Fringe.

O’Connor achieved the first double of her career at the Fairyhouse Winter Festival in December 2019, riding Demi Plie to a win in the Mares' Handicap Chase and then won on Brawler in the Handicap Hurdle. She won the ladies’ handicap hurdle at Fairyhouse on New Year's Day 2020, winning on JP McManus-owned Spruced Up.

In 2020, she won the Schiaparelli Willoughby De Broke Open Hunters' Chase on Minella Rocco.

In January 2023, she won at Gowran Park on Goffs Thyestes Day where she rode Hands Of Gold to win the ladies’ maiden hurdle.

In May 2024, she won the Grade Three Mares Bumper at Punchestown on Familiar Trait. That month, she finished runner-up to Jody Townend as Champion lady amateur.

== Personal life ==
She married fellow jockey Niall Madden in County Limerick in June 2022. Her sister Ciara is also a jockey, and is married to race horse owner Harry Fry.
