= Espoir d'Allen =

French racehorse

- Sire: Voix du Nord
- Grandsire: Valanour
- Dam: Quadanse
- Damsire: Maille Pistol
- Sex: Gelding
- Foaled: 23 February 2014
- Country: France
- Colour: Bay
- Breeder: Bruno Vagne
- Owner: Walter Connors; John P. McManus
- Trainer: Gavin Cromwell
- Record: 10: 9-0-0
- Earnings: £371,707

Major wins
- Bar One Racing Juvenile Hurdle (2017); Knight Frank Juvenile Hurdle (2017); Fishery Lane Hurdle (2018); Irish Independent Hurdle (2018); Limestone Lad Hurdle (2019); Champion Hurdle (2019)

Espoir d'Allen was a French-bred, Irish-trained racehorse who won the 2019 Champion Hurdle.

== Background ==
Espoir d'Allen was a bay horse with a narrow white blaze bred in France by Bruno Vagne. He was sired by the Thoroughbred stallion Voix du Nord out of the AQPS mare Quadanse.

== Racing career ==
=== 2017/2018 season ===
Espoir d'Allen won the Bar One Racing Juvenile Hurdle at Fairyhouse and the Knight Frank Juvenile Hurdle at Leopardstown Racecourse in the latter part of 2017.

=== 2018/2019 season ===
In his second season over jumps Espoir d'Allen won the Fishery Lane Hurdle at Naas Racecourse in November and the Irish Independent Hurdle at Limerick Racecourse in December. In January 2019 he took the Limestone Lad Hurdle at Naas. At Cheltenham Racecourse on 12 March he won the Champion Hurdle at odds of 16/1, coming home fifteen lengths clear of his nine opponents.

In August 2019 Espoir d'Allen injured his shoulder after rearing up and falling during an exercise canter. His condition deteriorated and he was euthanised on 23 August.
