= JJ Slevin =

Irish National Hunt jockey

Personal information
- Born: 1992 (age 33–34) Enniscorthy, County Wexford, Ireland
- Occupation: Jockey

Horse racing career
- Sport: Horse racing
- Career wins: 291 (4 January 2025)

Significant horses
- General Principle, Intense Raffles, Home By The Lee, Banbridge, Fastorslow
- Updated on 4 January 2025

James Joseph Slevin (born July 1992) is an Irish National Hunt jockey, who has ridden multiple Grade 1 winners and two Irish Grand National winners. In January 2025 he was appointed retained rider to owners Simon Munir and Isaac Souede.

== Background ==
Slevin comes from a racing background. His father, Shay Slevin, is a trainer and his mother, Elizabeth, is the sister of trainer Aidan O'Brien. Slevin grew up in Kiltrea, near Enniscorthy in County Wexford. He obtained a degree in journalism from Griffith College Dublin, while his brother Mark trained as a vet.

== Career as a jockey ==
Slevin rode for several years as an amateur jockey. He rode 34 winners in point-to-points, the first of them being Herecomestherain, trained by his father Shay, at Ballydarragh on 14 November 2010. His first winner under rules was Chapel Garden, trained by John Clifford, in a National Hunt flat race at Thurles on 22 December 2013. His eleven wins as an amateur included a Grade 3 win on Moylisha Tim in the Cork E.B.F. Novice Hurdle in November 2015, and two wins for trainer Nigel Twiston-Davies in Britain.

In August 2016, Slevin took out a professional licence and finished joint first in a dead-heat in his first race as conditional jockey in a handicap hurdle at Roscommon. He achieved his first Cheltenham Festival win in March 2017, when he rode Champagne Classic, trained by Gordon Elliott, to victory in the Martin Pipe Conditional Jockeys' Handicap Hurdle. In February 2018, he won his first Grade 1 race on Tower Bridge in the Golden Cygnet Novice Hurdle at Leopardstown for his cousin Joseph O'Brien.

Slevin won his first Irish Grand National on the Elliott-trained General Principle in April 2018. Starting at odds of 20/1, General Principle was not one of the more fancied of Elliot's 13 runners but gave the trainer his first victory in the race in a photo-finish. A second win in the race for Slevin came six years later on the grey Intense Raffles, trained by Thomas Gibney and owned by Simon Munir and Isaac Souede. Fastorslow, trained by Martin Brassil, provided Slevin with back-to-back wins in the 2023 and 2024 Punchestown Gold Cup and a win in the 2023 John Durkan Memorial Punchestown Chase. Banbridge and Home By The Lee, both trained by O'Brien, also provided him with Grade 1 victories.

Following the retirement of Daryl Jacob on 29 December 2024, Slevin was offered the role of retained jockey in Great Britain and Ireland for owners Munir and Souede. That weekend he had won two Grade 1 races at the Leopardstown Christmas festival: the Paddy's Reward Club Chase on Solness and the Savills Hurdle on Home By The Lee, with whom he had previously won the race in 2022. On his first day in his new role, 2 January 2025, he partnered Al Kalila and O'Toole to win at Ayr in the double green colours of Munir and Souede.

== Cheltenham Festival winners (4) ==
- Stayers' Hurdle - (1) Home By The Lee (2026)
- Martin Pipe Conditional Jockeys' Handicap Hurdle - (1) Champagne Classic (2017)
- Fred Winter Juvenile Handicap Hurdle - (2) Band of Outlaws (2019), Lark in the Mornin (2024)

== Major wins ==
(Republic of Ireland) Ireland

- Golden Cygnet Novice Hurdle - (1) Tower Bridge (2018)
- Christmas Hurdle - (2) Home By The Lee (2022, 2024)
- Punchestown Gold Cup - (2) Fastorslow (2023, 2024)
- John Durkan Memorial Punchestown Chase - (1) Fastorslow (2023)
- Punchestown Champion Chase - (1) Banbridge (2024)
- Paddy's Reward Club Chase - (1) Solness (2024)
- Tattersalls Ireland Novice Hurdle - (1) Talk The Talk (2026)
- Channor Real Estate Group Novice Hurdle - (1) Le Frimeur (2026)

(United Kingdom) Great Britain

- Liverpool Hurdle - (1) Home By The Lee (2026)
- Manifesto Novices' Chase - (1) Banbridge (2023)
- Sefton Novices' Hurdle - (1) Zeus Power (2026)
