= Tongue-tie (tack) =

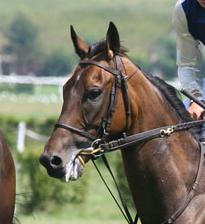
This horse wears a tongue-tie, the yellow object seen by the mouth.

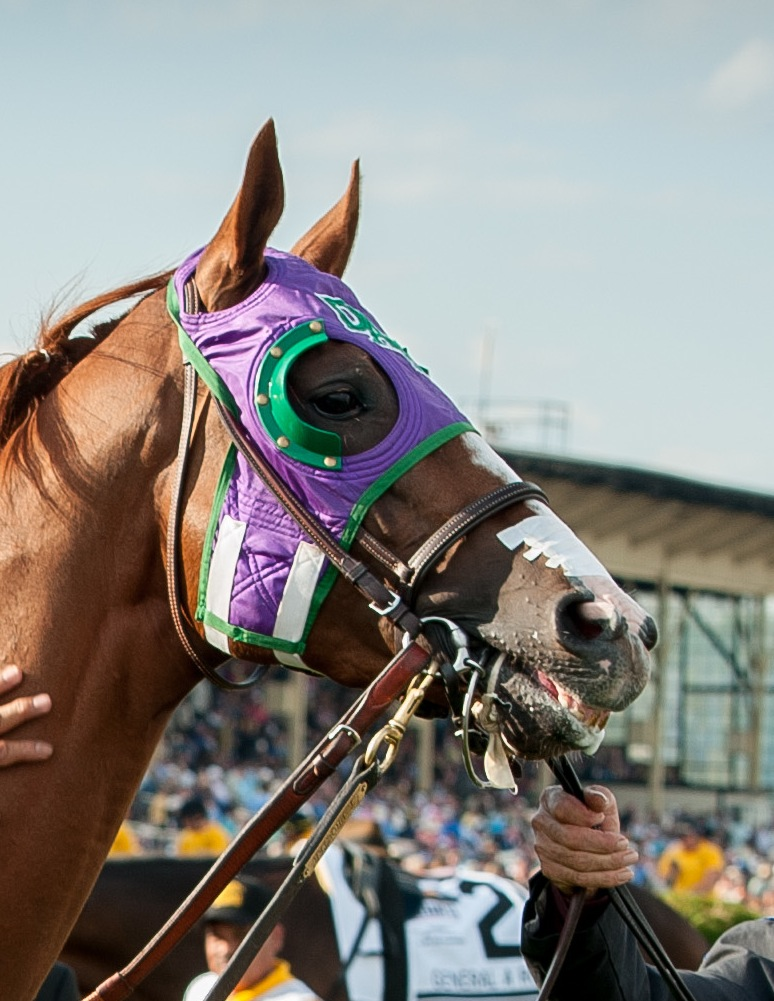
Tongue tie visible below the bit on California Chrome

A tongue-tie is a piece of equipment used by equestrians to prevent a horse from getting its tongue over the bit, which would make the animal very difficult to control. It is usually a strip of cloth or rubber, passed through the mouth and tied below the chin.

Tongue ties are illegal in competitive events such as most horse show disciplines, but very common in other sports, such as horse racing. The device is controversial in some circles where its use considered abusive. However, due to the life or death safety and control issues inherent in certain extreme equestrian sports, such as horse racing, it is considered by its proponents as a necessary tool for some animals. Sometimes it is viewed as necessary to prevent the horse's tongue from moving, either to move the bit out of position, rendering it ineffective, or to keep the tongue from obstructing the airway if the horse puts its tongue over the bit. The horse's inability to "accept" the bit, whether it be that it was broken in abruptly, or due to assorted riders' heavy-handedness, is often given as another reason for use of a tongue tie. Some equine behaviorists argue that the need of a tongue tie is indication of a deeper underlying issue, and that the tongue tie itself is a mere crutch that does not solve the problem.

Research has shown that the tongue-tie does not restrict the animal's breathing. However, research has also shown that the tongue-tie does not provide a respiratory benefit in healthy animals (as some trainers believe it prevents the horse's tongue from coming up, and therefore allows for free air intake). Other studies have shown that it does help prevent dorsal displacement of the soft palate, but success rate is low.
