= 2019 Champion Hurdle =

89th Champion Hurdle
- Champion Hurdle
- Location: Cheltenham Racecourse
- Date: 12 March 2019
- Winning horse: Espoir d'Allen
- Jockey: Mark Walsh
- Trainer: Gavin Cromwell

The 2019 Champion Hurdle was a horse race held at Cheltenham Racecourse on Tuesday 12 March 2019. It was the 89th running of the Champion Hurdle.

The race was won by 16/1 chance Espoir d'Allen, ridden by Mark Walsh and trained by Gavin Cromwell. Two-time winner Buveur d'Air fell at the third hurdle.

== Race details ==
- Sponsor: Unibet
- Purse:
- Going:Soft
- Distance:2 miles 87 yards
- Number of runners: 10
- Winner's time: 3:59.07
