= Bryan Cooper (jockey) =

Irish jockey (born 1992)

Personal information
- Nationality: Irish
- Born: 7 August 1992 (age 33) Tralee, County Kerry, Ireland
- Occupation: Jockey

Horse racing career
- Sport: Horse racing

Major racing wins
- Triumph Hurdle, Cheltenham Gold Cup
- Updated on 4 January 2014

Bryan Cooper (born 7 August 1992) is a retired Irish National Hunt jockey and is the son of trainer Tom Cooper and his mother is Geraldine Cooper née O'Brien. Cooper was born in Tralee, County Kerry, Ireland and in his short career scored notable wins at the National Hunt Cheltenham Festival.

== Background and early life ==
Coming from a horsey family it was virtually inevitable that Cooper would be involved in that industry. Around the time he was born his parents won a pony in a raffle and this was named Snowy by the family. At an early age Cooper jumped up on Snowy's back and rode him around his father's yard. He then progressed to the pony and show jumping circuit and retained an interest in these events until he was around 15 years old.

Cooper took part in his first race when he was just 14, learning his trade in his father's yard and spending his school holidays in the yard of Dessie Hughes. Knowing that a life in the horse industry was for him, Cooper left school before completing his final exams and took up a post in the yard of Kevin Prendergast which led to his first racecourse ride in The Curragh on 14 September 2008.

== Riding career ==
At 15 Cooper weighed 8 stone 4 pound, but a growth spurt during this period put paid to his chances of riding on the flat. He returned to Dessie Hughes' yard so that he could take up riding National Hunt horses which was always his first love. Memorably for Cooper his first win was aboard Rossdara, a horse trained by his father, in a maiden hurdle race at Clonmel on 29 October 2009.

A few weeks later Cooper rode his first winner for Dessie Hughes at Punchestown and in the next season 2010/11 he fulfilled his promise by winning the conditional championship and winning his first Listed race by piloting Coscorrig to victory in the John Fowler Mares Chase. His winning margin was 14 better than his nearest rival and he also managed to win at the renowned Galway Races that begin on the last Monday in July. The teenage Cooper had another exceptional season in 2011/12 finishing the season with 36 wins and also scoring his first Grade 1 victory aboard Benefficent for Tony Martin in the Deloitte Novice Hurdle at Leopardstown in February. He also won two Grade 2 races for Dessie Hughes at Thurles and Limerick and managed to ride a few placed horses at the Cheltenham Festival meet.

The world really took notice of Cooper in the 2012/13 season after 3 wins at the Cheltenham Festival meeting. His wins came on rides aboard Benefficient in the Golden Miller Novices' Chase, Our Conor in the Triumph Hurdle and Ted Veale in the County Handicap Hurdle. His total number of wins was only one behind that of Ruby Walsh. He also managed to place fifth in the Grand National at Aintree on Rare Bob, but his season was cut short after he broke his femur while riding at Down Royal.

It was announced on 3 January 2014 that Cooper would take over the position of retained jockey for Gigginstown House Stud from the 2012/13 Irish Champion Jockey Davy Russell. Cooper had his first winner for the stud riding Toner D’Oudairies at the Listed Thurles Racecourse Supporters Club Chase on 6 January 2014.

On the second day of the 2014 Cheltenham Festival, Cooper sustained fractures to his tibia and fibula in a fall at the last in the Fred Winter Juvenile Novices' Handicap Hurdle. At the 2016 Cheltenham Festival Meeting Cooper won the Cheltenham Gold Cup riding Don Cossack; this race is the Blue Riband of National Hunt Racing. On 28 July Gigginstown Stud manager Eddie O'Leary announced that Cooper would no longer be retained by Gigginstown but would continue to ride for Gigginstown a lot.

On the second day of the Cheltenham Festival 2023 Cooper was scheduled for three rides but felt compelled to cry off, after which he announced his surprise retirement.

== Cheltenham Festival winners (9) ==
- Cheltenham Gold Cup -(1) Don Cossack (2016)
- Triumph Hurdle -(1) Our Conor (2013)
- David Nicholson Mares' Hurdle -(1) Apple's Jade (2017)
- RSA Insurance Novices' Chase -(1) Don Poli (2015)
- Golden Miller Novices' Chase -(1) Benefficient (2013)
- Pertemps Final – (1) Mrs Milner (2021)
- Magners Plate Handicap Chase – (2) Empire of Dirt (2016), Road to Respect (2017)
- County Handicap Hurdle – (1) Ted Veale (2013)

== Major wins ==
(Republic of Ireland) Ireland

- Ryanair Gold Cup -(1) Road To Respect (2017)
- Mares Champion Hurdle -(1) Apple's Jade (2017)
- Champion Four Year Old Hurdle -(2) Petite Parisienne (2015), Apple's Jade (2016)
- Irish Daily Mirror Novice Hurdle -(1) Champagne Classic (2017)
- Drinmore Novice Chase -(2) Valseur Lido (2014), No More Heroes (2015)
- Hatton's Grace Hurdle -(1) Apple's Jade (2016)
- Racing Post Novice Chase -(2) Clarcam (2014), Franco De Port (2020)
- Paddy's Reward Club "Sugar Paddy" Chase -(1) Benefficient (2013)
- Christmas Hurdle -(1) Lieutenant Colonel (2014)
- JNwine.com Champion Chase -(2) Roi du Mee (2013), Don Cossack (2015)
- Savills Chase -(2) Road To Riches (2014), Don Poli (2015)
- December Festival Hurdle -(1) Petit Mouchoir (2016)
- Fort Leney Novice Chase -(2) Don Poli (2014), No More Heroes (2015)
- Arkle Novice Chase -(2) Benefficient (2013), Trifolium (2014)
- Golden Cygnet Novice Hurdle -(2) A Toi Phil (2016), Latest Exhibition (2020)
- Spring Juvenile Hurdle -(1) Petite Parisienne (2015)
- Chanelle Pharma Novice Hurdle -(1) Benefficient (2012)
- Dr P. J. Moriarty Novice Chase -(1) Outlander (2016)
- Dooley Insurance Group Champion Novice Chase -(1) Disko (2017)

(United Kingdom) Great Britain

- Anniversary 4-Y-O Novices' Hurdle -(1) Apple's Jade (2016)
- Betway Bowl -(1) First Lieutenant (2013)
- Maghull Novices' Chase -(1) Special Tiara (2013)
- Fighting Fifth Hurdle -(1) Identity Thief (2015)
