= Andrew McNamara (jockey) =

Irish jockey

Andrew McNamara is a retired Irish National Hunt jockey. McNamara had his first winning ride on La Captive in a bumper at Wexford in July 2002. He turned professional at the beginning of the 2004-05 season.

In 2006, he won the Queen Mother Champion Chase on Newmill. He also won the 2010 Irish Grand National on Bluesea Cracker. On 14 August 2015, he won on his last ride, which was on The Right Honourable at Tramore.

McNamara retired on a winner when he partnered the 'Shark' Hanlon-trained Most Honourable at Tramore on 14 August 2015 and immediately turned his attentions to training. He trained his first winner at Punchestown on 14 May 2016 when Double Speak won the opening maiden hurdle in the hands of Robbie Power.

In 2013, he appeared on documentary The Irish Road To Cheltenham, which was shown on RTÉ One channel in Irelaje.

== Major wins ==
(Republic of Ireland) Ireland

- Irish Gold Cup -(1) Beef Or Salmon (2007)
- Irish Champion Hurdle -(1) Sizing Europe (2008)
- Punchestown Champion Chase -(1) Newmill (2006)
- Christmas Hurdle -(2) Catch Me (2008), Powerstation (2009)
- John Durkan Memorial Punchestown Chase -(2) Hi Cloy (2005), Tranquil Sea (2010)
- Drinmore Novice Chase -(1) Sky's the Limit (2007)
- Hatton's Grace Hurdle -(1) Catch Me (2008)
- Racing Post Novice Chase -(1) Sky's The Limit (2007)
- Alanna Homes Champion Novice Hurdle -(1) Tranquil Sea (2008)
- Paddy's Reward Club "Sugar Paddy" Chase -(1) Hi Cloy (2005)
- JNwine.com Champion Chase -(2) Beef Or Salmon (2006), The Listener (2009)
- Greenmount Park Novice Chase -(1) Argocat (2012)
- Golden Cygnet Novice Hurdle -(1) Hidden Cyclone (2011)
- Spring Juvenile Hurdle -(1) Jumbo Rio (2009)
- Champion Four Year Old Hurdle -(1) Jumbo Rio (2009)
- Mares Novice Hurdle Championship Final -(1) Shadow Eile (2012)

(United Kingdom) Great Britain

- Queen Mother Champion Chase -(1) Newmill (2006)
- Melling Chase -(1) Hi Cloy (2006)
