= Leopardstown Racecourse =

Horse racing venue in the Republic of Ireland

Coordinates: 53°15′57″N 6°11′21″W

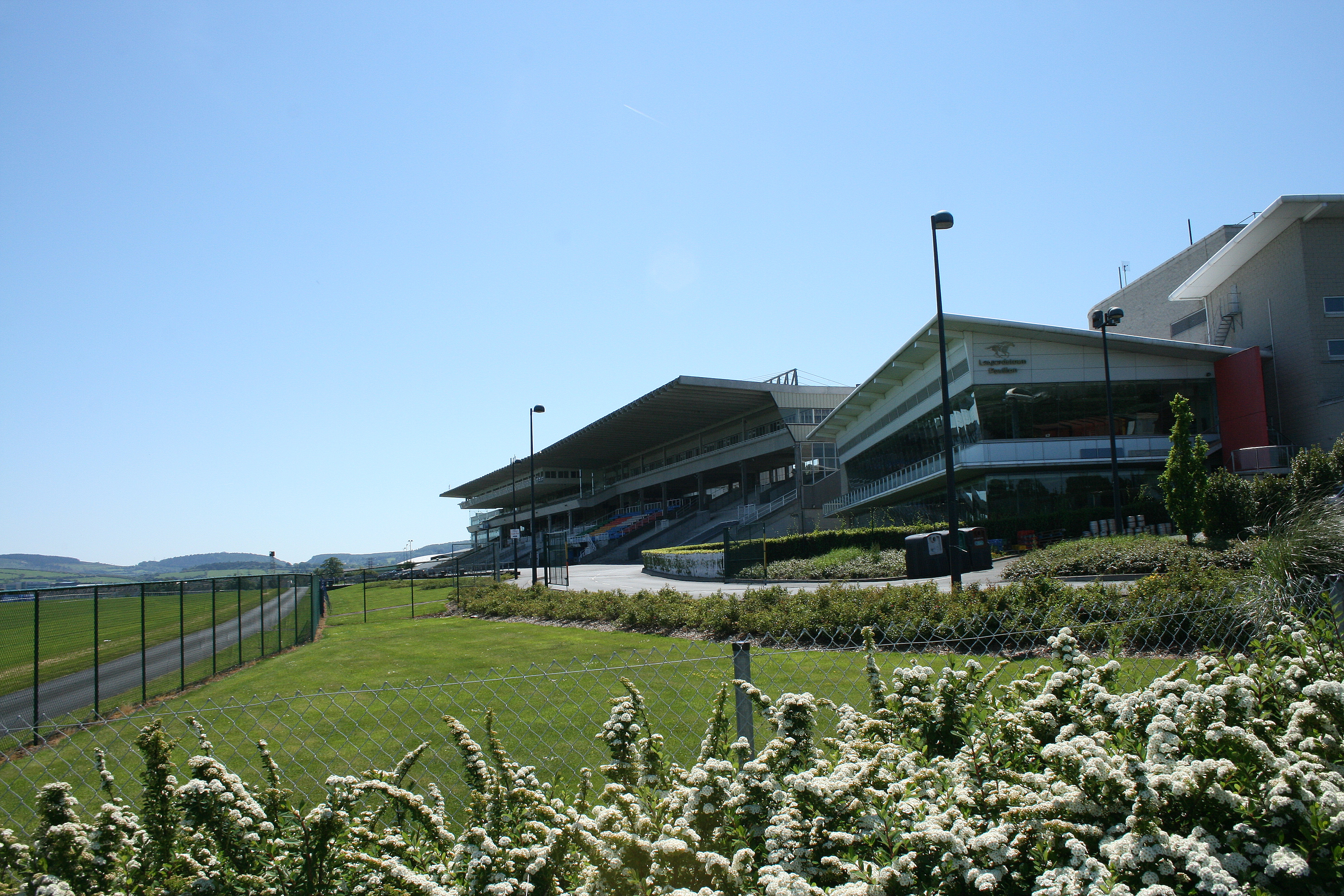
Stand at Leopardstown Racecourse

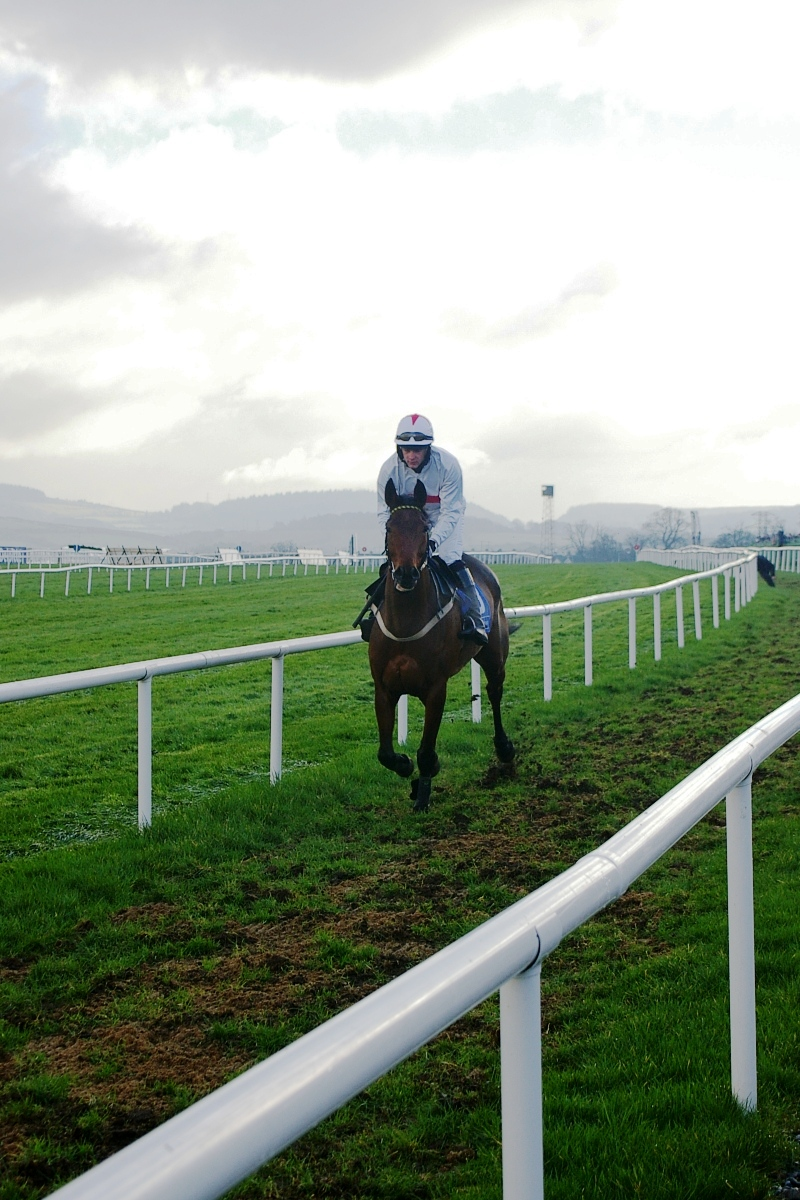
Heading for the start with Wicklow Mountains in background

Leopardstown Racecourse is a horse-racing course in Leopardstown, approximately 8 kilometres (5 mi) south of Dublin city centre, in Ireland. Like the majority of Irish courses, it hosts both National Hunt and Flat racing.

Built by Captain George Quin and modelled on Sandown Park Racecourse in England, it was completed in 1888 and acquired by the Horse Racing Board of Ireland in 1967. Many important races are held there; racing takes place all year round, with about 22 meetings per year.

In 1941, Royal Air Force pilot Hugh Verity, who flew many secret agents at night into and out of farm fields in France, force-landed on the racecourse. He was interned briefly before escaping back to England.

The Leopardstown Hall of Fame honours famous Irish horse racing trainers, jockeys and horses, including Vincent O'Brien, Tom Dreaper, Pat Taaffe and Pat Eddery, Arkle, Dawn Run, Levmoss and Nijinsky.

== Facilities ==
Leopardstown golf course and club house is situated in the middle of the racetrack. The course also has designer shops, a fitness centre, the Leopardstown Pavilion, Fillies Café Bar, the Silken Glider Restaurant, the Paddock Food Hall, Club 92 nightclub, Madigans pub, and numerous bars and snack areas. A farmers' market is also on-site every Friday. The "Bulmers Live at Leopardstown" music festival takes place every summer between June and August. Acts such as Horslips, the Human League, Johnny Marr, and the Boomtown Rats have performed there.

== Notable races ==
Month	Day/Date	Race Name	Type	Grade	Distance	Age/Sex
January	Saturday	Killiney Novice Chase	Chase	Grade 3	2m 3f	5yo +
January	Saturday	Ladbrokes Hurdle	Hurdle	Handicap	2m	4yo +
January	Sunday	Irish Champion Hurdle	Hurdle	Grade 1	2m	4yo +
January	Sunday	Golden Cygnet Novice Hurdle	Hurdle	Grade 2	2m 4f	5yo +
January	Sunday	Arkle Novice Chase	Chase	Grade 1	2m 1f	5yo +
February	Sunday	Irish Gold Cup	Chase	Grade 1	3m	5yo +
February	Sunday	Dr P. J. Moriarty Novice Chase	Chase	Grade 1	2m 5f	5yo +
February	Sunday	Chanelle Pharma Novice Hurdle	Hurdle	Grade 1	2m 2f	5yo +
February	Sunday	Spring Juvenile Hurdle	Hurdle	Grade 1	2m	4yo only
March	Sunday	Leopardstown 2,000 Guineas Trial Stakes	Flat	Listed	1m	3yo only
March	Sunday	Leopardstown 1,000 Guineas Trial Stakes	Flat	Group 3	7f	3yo only
April	Wednesday	Heritage Stakes	Flat	Listed	1m	4yo +
May	Sunday	Amethyst Stakes	Flat	Group 3	1m	3yo +
May	Sunday	Derrinstown Stud Derby Trial	Flat	Group 3	1m 2f	3yo only
May	Sunday	Cornelscourt Stakes	Flat	Group 3	1m	3yo only f
June	Friday	Saval Beg Stakes	Flat	Listed	1m 6f	4yo +
June	Thursday	Ballycorus Stakes	Flat	Group 3	7f	3yo +
June	Thursday	Ballyogan Stakes	Flat	Group 3	6f	3yo + f
July	Thursday	Silver Flash Stakes	Flat	Group 3	7f	2yo only f
July	Thursday	Meld Stakes	Flat	Group 3	1m 1f	3yo +
July	Thursday	Tyros Stakes	Flat	Group 3	7f	2yo only
August	Thursday	Ballyroan Stakes	Flat	Group 3	1m 4f	3yo +
August	Thursday	Desmond Stakes	Flat	Group 3	1m	3yo +
September	Saturday	Irish Champion Stakes	Flat	Group 1	1m 2f	3yo +
September	Saturday	Golden Fleece Stakes	Flat	Group 1	1m 1f	2yo only
September	Saturday	Matron Stakes	Flat	Group 1	1m	3yo + f
September	Saturday	Kilternan Stakes	Flat	Group 3	1m 2f	3yo +
October	Saturday	Killavullan Stakes	Flat	Group 3	7f	2yo only
November	Sunday	Eyrefield Stakes	Flat	Listed	1m 1f	2yo only
December	St. Stephen's Day	Fort Leney Novice Chase	Chase	Grade 1	3m	4yo +
December	St. Stephen's Day	O'Driscolls Irish Whiskey Juvenile Hurdle	Hurdle	Grade 2	2m	3yo only
December	27th	Paddy's Reward Club Chase	Chase	Grade 1	2m 1f	5yo +
December	27th	Paddy Power Future Champions Novice Hurdle	Hurdle	Grade 1	2m	4yo +
December	28th	Christmas Hurdle	Hurdle	Grade 1	3m	4yo +
December	28th	Savills Chase	Chase	Grade 1	3m	5yo +
December	29th	December Hurdle	Hurdle	Grade 1	2m	4yo +
December	29th	Leopardstown E.B.F. Mares Hurdle	Hurdle	Grade 3	2m 4f	4yo + m

== Transport ==
Leopardstown Racecourse was originally served by Foxrock railway station on the Harcourt Street line until it closed in 1958. A Luas Green Line stop is located in the top of Carrickmines at the southern end of the racecourse. However, as of January 2016 it remains unopened and devoid of all signage, with trams passing through non-stop. The nearest active Luas stop is Central Park.

== See also ==
- Fairyhouse racecourse
- List of Irish flat horse races
- Phoenix Stakes
- Trial races for the Epsom Derby
