= Niall Madden =

Irish jockey

Niall "Slippers" Madden (born 11 November 1985) is a retired Irish jockey who rode the racehorse Numbersixvalverde to win the 2006 Grand National steeplechase at Aintree Racecourse.

Madden's nickname is "Slippers", as a comparison with his father Niall Madden, also a jockey, whose nickname was "Boots". He rode for Noel Meade and won the 2006 Christmas Hurdle for Meade on Jazz Messenger. Madden retired as a jockey after riding at Punchestown on 31 December 2020.

== Personal life ==
He married fellow jockey Aine O'Connor in June 2022.

== Major wins ==
(Republic of Ireland) Ireland

- Slaney Novice Hurdle -(1) Toofarback (2006)
- Golden Cygnet Novice Hurdle -(1) Liskennett (2008)
- Paddy's Reward Club "Sugar Paddy" Chase -(1) Nickname (2006)

(United Kingdom) Great Britain

- Grand National -(1) Numbersixvalverde (2006)
- Christmas Hurdle - (1) Jazz Messenger (2006)
