= Jack Kennedy (jockey) =

Irish jockey

- Occupation: Jockey
- Discipline: National Hunt racing
- Born: April 22, 1999 (age 27)

Jack Kennedy (born 22 April 1999) is an Irish jockey who competes in National Hunt racing. He registered his biggest win when riding Minella Indo to victory in the 2021 Cheltenham Gold Cup.

== Cheltenham Festival winners (13) ==
- Cheltenham Gold Cup - (1) Minella Indo (2021)
- Stayers' Hurdle - (1) Teahupoo (2024)
- Supreme Novices' Hurdle - (1) Labaik (2017)
- Baring Bingham Novices' Hurdle - (1) Samcro (2018)
- Triumph Hurdle - (1) Farclas (2018)
- David Nicholson Mares' Hurdle - (2) Black Tears (2021), Wodhooh (2026)
- Golden Miller Novices' Chase - (1) Shattered Love (2018)
- Fred Winter Juvenile Novices' Handicap Hurdle - (1) Veneer of Charm (2018)
- Glenfarclas Cross Country Chase - (2) Delta Work (2022, 2023)
- National Hunt Chase Challenge Cup - (1) Galvin (2021)
- Fulke Walwyn Kim Muir Challenge Cup - (1) Mount Ida (2021)

== Other major wins ==
(Republic of Ireland) Ireland

- Irish Gold Cup - (1) Delta Work (2020)
- Irish Champion Hurdle - (2) Apple's Jade (2019), Brighterdaysahead (2026)
- Champion Stayers Hurdle - (1) Teahupoo (2024)
- Ladbrokes Champion Chase - (2) Outlander (2017), Gerri Colombe (2023)
- Morgiana Hurdle - (2) Abacadabras (2020), Brighterdaysahead (2024)
- Royal Bond Novice Hurdle - (3) Mengli Khan (2017), Ballyadam (2020), Farren Glory (2023)
- Drinmore Novice Chase - (2) Envoi Allen (2020), Mighty Potter (2022)
- Hatton's Grace Hurdle - (5) Apple's Jade (2017, 2018), Teahupoo (2022, 2023, 2025)
- Paddy Power Future Champions Novice Hurdle - (4) Abracadabras (2019), Mighty Potter (2021), Caldwell Potter (2023), Skylight Hustle (2025)
- Christmas Hurdle - (4) Apple's Jade (2018, 2019), Irish Point (2023), Teahupoo (2025)
- Savills Chase - (2) Delta Work (2019), Conflated (2022)
- Slaney Novice Hurdle - (3) Death Duty (2017), Battleoverdoyen (2019), Ginto (2022)
- Golden Cygnet Novice Hurdle - (1) Commander of Fleet (2019)
- Chanelle Pharma Novice Hurdle - (1) Samcro (2018)
- Dooley Insurance Group Champion Novice Chase - (1) Western Fold (2026)
- Alanna Homes Champion Novice Hurdle - (1) Dortmund Park (2018)
- Fort Leney Novice Chase - (1) Fury Road (2021)
- Bective Stud Champion Novice Hurdle - (1) Mighty Potter (2022)
- Racing Post Novice Chase - (1) Found A Fifty (2023)
- Arkle Novice Chase - (1) Romeo Coolio (2026)

(United Kingdom) Great Britain

- Aintree Bowl - (1) Gerri Colombe (2024)
- Aintree Hurdle - (2) Abacadabras (2021), Brighterdaysahead (2026)
- Anniversary 4-Y-O Juvenile Hurdle - (1) Mange Tout (2026)
- Maghull Novices' Chase - (1) Found A Fifty (2024)
- Mersey Novices' Hurdle - (1) Brighterdaysahead (2024)
- Top Novices' Hurdle - (1) Felix Desjy (2019)

United States

- Grand National Hurdle Stakes – (2) Zanahiyr (2025), Western Fold (2026)
