= Paul Townend =

Irish jockey (born 1990)

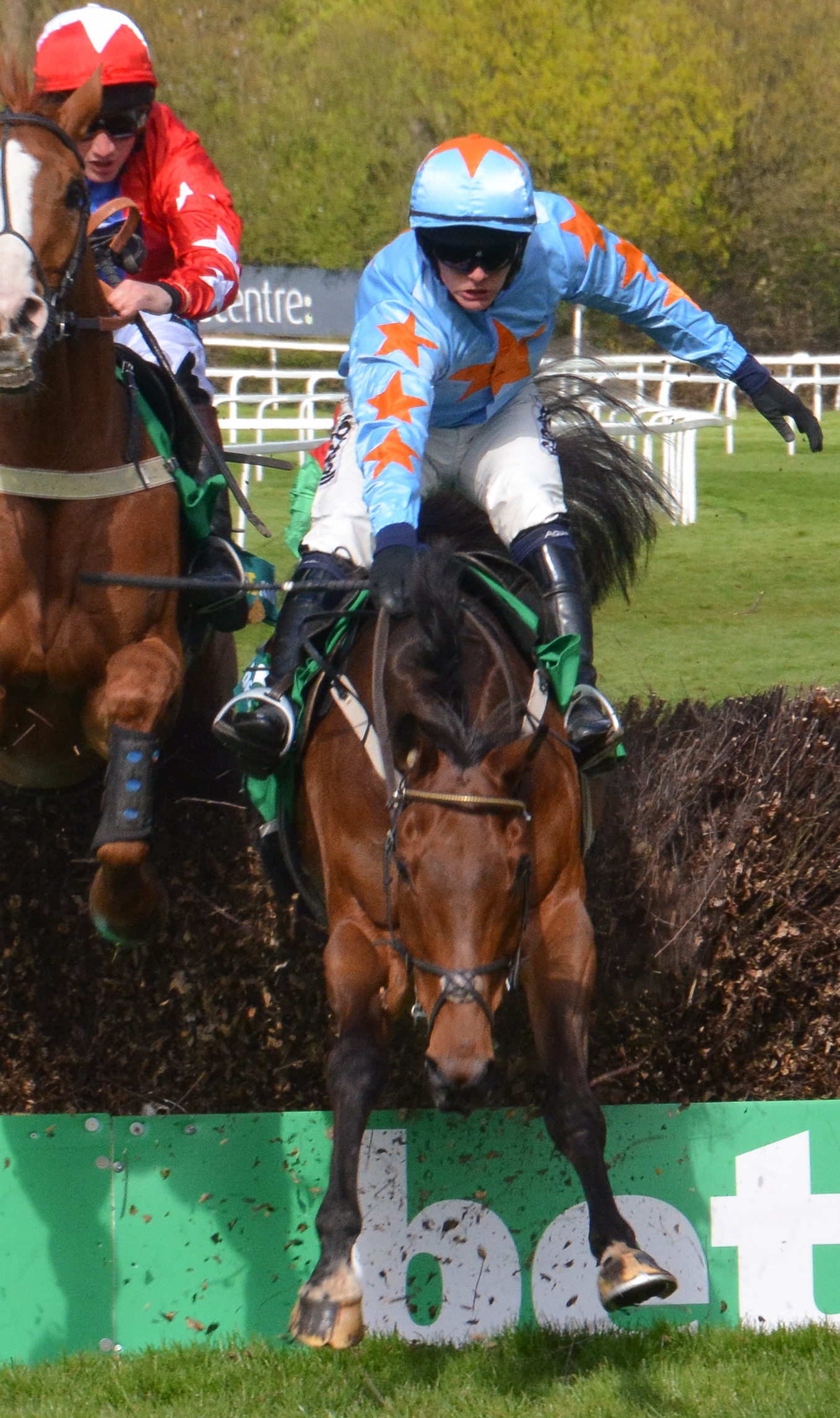
Paul Townend (right) riding Un De Sceaux at Sandown Park in 2016

Paul Townend (born 15 September 1990) is an Irish jockey who competes in National Hunt racing. From Lisgoold in County Cork, he has been attached to the yard of Irish trainer Willie Mullins since he was fifteen, beginning his career as an apprentice flat racing jockey. Following the retirement of Ruby Walsh in 2019, Townend became the number one jockey to the Mullins yard.

In 2019 he gave Willie Mullins his first Cheltenham Gold Cup winner with Al Boum Photo and he repeated this success in 2020. He recorded his third and fourth win in the race on Galopin Des Champs in 2023 and 2024, and his fifth win in 2026 with Gaelic Warrior. He won the 2023 Irish Grand National, the 2024 Aintree Grand National and the 2026 Aintree Grand National on I Am Maximus for Mullins. He is a seven-time Irish jump racing Champion Jockey (2010/11, 2018/19, 2019/20, 2020/21, 2021/22, 2022/23 and 2024/25 seasons).

== Early life ==
Townend (born 15 September 1990) comes from a racing background and grew up on a small farm in east County Cork. His father Tim trains point-to-point horses, his youngest sister Jody is an amateur jockey, and a cousin is retired jockey Davy Condon. He attended primary school in the village of Lisgoold and then went on to Midleton CBS Secondary School. While at school, he competed in pony racing. Having lost his mother Josephine to cancer, he left school after junior certificate and became an apprentice at the yard of trainer Willie Mullins, where his cousin was a jockey.

== Career ==
Townend started his racing career riding on the flat. His first win was on The Chip Chopman in an apprentice handicap at Limerick on 22 June 2007, when he was sixteen. He rode ten winners that season, but switched to riding over fences as a conditional jockey in 2008 due to his weight. In July 2008 he rode Indian Pace to victory in the Galway Hurdle. There were no more wins until November 2008, when he rode Hurricane Fly to victory in the Royal Bond Novice Hurdle on his first ride in a Grade 1 for Mullins. He had been given the ride because Mullins' number one jockey was sidelined with an injury. On New years Eve 2008 he rode out his claim by winning a treble at Tramore. He had his first ride in the Grand National in 2009, coming eleventh on Irish Invader. He rode his first Cheltenham Festival winner in 2011, when What A Charm, trained by Arthur Moore, won the Fred Winter Juvenile Novices' Handicap Hurdle. That season he became Irish jump racing Champion Jockey for the first time.

A bizarre incident in the Growise Champion Novice Chase at the 2018 Punchestown Festival cost Townend a 21 day ban for dangerous riding. Riding Al Boum Photo for Mullins, he had mistakenly thought that the last fence was to be bypassed and carried out another horse. The ban did not take effect until the start of the 2018/19 season, and Townend gained a treble the day after the incident. In March 2019 Townend rode Al Boum Photo in the Cheltenham Gold Cup, winning by two-and-a-half lengths to give both Townend and Mullins a first win in the race. Later that month, Townend achieved his maiden century, riding his 100th Irish winner at Clonmel. At the end of the 2018/19 season he was Irish jump racing Champion Jockey for the second time with 109 winner. When Walsh retired in May 2019, Townend became number one jockey for Mullins.

In 2020 Townend became top jockey at the Cheltenham Festival for the first time. He had 5 winners including a second win on Al Boum Photo in Gold Cup. At the end of the 2019/20 season Townend was crowned Irish jump racing Champion Jockey for the third time. He held the title for the next five seasons. He was top jockey at the Cheltenham festival in 2022, 2023, 2024, 2025 and 2026. He won the Queen Mother Champion Chase three times. He won riding Energumene in 2023 and 2024, while in 2026 he won the race for the third time on Il Etait Temps. He achieved back-to-back victories in the Gold Cup on Galopin Des Champs, equalling Pat Taaffe's record of four wins in the race in 2024 and breaking the record in 2026 with Gaelic Warrior. In 2024 he won the Champion Hurdle on State Man and won the race in 2026 on Lossiemouth.

In April 2023, Townend won the Irish Grand National with I Am Maximus, owned by JP McManus and trained by Mullins. The following year, the partnership won the Aintree Grand National. It was Townend's thirteenth ride in the race. He had only completed the course on three occasions, coming eleventh on Irish Invader in 2009, sixteenth on Prince De Beauchene in 2014 and third on Gaillard Du Mesnil in 2023. In the 2025 Grand National, Townend again rode I Am Maximus, who finished second to Nick Rockett. In 2026, I Am Maximus, with Townend riding, regained the Grand National, the first horse since Red Rum to do so.

== Personal life ==
Townend lives in Co Kilkenny with his girlfriend Sophie Vard Ryan and three Shetland ponies.

== Cheltenham Festival winners (42) ==
- Cheltenham Gold Cup - (5) Al Boum Photo (2019, 2020), Galopin Des Champs (2023, 2024), Gaelic Warrior (2026)
- Queen Mother Champion Chase - (3) Energumene (2022, 2023), Il Etait Temps (2026)
- Champion Hurdle - (2) State Man (2024), Lossiemouth (2026)
- Arkle Challenge Trophy - (3) Duc des Genievres (2019), El Fabiolo (2023), Gaelic Warrior (2024)
- Broadway Novices' Chase - (1) Monkfish (2021)
- Supreme Novices' Hurdle - (2) Appreciate It (2021), Kopek Des Bordes (2025)
- Turner Novices' Hurdle - (4) Sir Gerhard (2022), Impaire Et Passe (2023), Ballyburn (2024), King Rasko Grey (2026)
- Champion Bumper - (1) Ferny Hollow (2020)
- David Nicholson Mares' Hurdle - (3) Glens Melody (2015), Lossiemouth (2024, 2025)
- Albert Bartlett Novices' Hurdle - (3) Penhill (2017), Monkfish (2020), Jasmin De Vaux (2025)
- Stayers' Hurdle - (1) Penhill (2018)
- Triumph Hurdle - (3) Burning Victory (2020), Vauban (2022), Lossiemouth (2023)
- Centenary Novices' Handicap Chase - (1) Irish Cavalier (2015)
- Fred Winter Juvenile Novices' Handicap Hurdle - (1) What A Charm (2011)
- County Handicap Hurdle - (5) Wicklow Brave (2015), Arctic Fire (2017), State Man (2022), Absurde (2024), Kargese (2025)
- Liberthine Mares' Chase - (1) Colreevy (2021)
- Ryanair Chase - (2) Min (2020), Allaho (2022)
- Dawn Run Mares' Novices' Hurdle - (1) Laurina (2018)

== Major wins ==
(Republic of Ireland) Ireland

- Irish Gold Cup - (3) Galopin Des Champs (2023, 2024, 2025)
- Arkle Novice Chase - (4) Golden Silver (2009), Footpad (2018), Energumene (2021), Blue Lord (2022)
- Alanna Homes Champion Novice Hurdle - (6) Gaillard Du Mesnil (2021), State Man (2022), Impaire Et Passe (2023), Ballyburn (2024), Final Demand (2025), King Rasko Grey (2026)
- Dublin Chase - (4) Chacun Pour Soi (2020, 2021, 2022), El Fabiolo (2024)
- Champion Stayers Hurdle - (3) Quevega (2010), Klassical Dream (2022, 2023)
- Tattersalls Ireland Novice Hurdle - (5) Champagne Fever (2013), Appreciate It (2021), Sir Gerhard (2022), Ballyburn (2024), Kopek Des Bordes (2025)
- Christmas Hurdle - (2) Mourad (2010), Klassical Dream (2021)
- Punchestown Gold Cup - (3) Allaho (2022), Galopin Des Champs (2025), Gaelic Warrior (2026)
- Dr P. J. Moriarty Novice Chase - (6) Citizen Vic (2010), Boston Bob (2013), Faugheen (2020), Monkfish (2021), Galopin Des Champs (2022), Ballyburn (2025)
- Future Champions Novice Hurdle - (4) Hurricane Fly (2008), Saturnas (2016), Appreciate It (2020), Facile Vega (2022)
- Golden Cygnet Novice Hurdle - (4) Outlander (2015), Gaillard Du Mesnil (2021), Final Demand (2025), Doctor Steinberg (2026)
- Greenmount Park Novice Chase - (1) Bellshill (2016)
- Hatton's Grace Hurdle - (2) Hurricane Fly (2010), Lossiemouth (2024)
- Fort Leney Novice Chase - (3) Monkfish (2020), Gaillard Du Mesnil (2022), Grangeclare West (2023)
- Champion Four Year Old Hurdle - (3) Vauban (2022), Lossiemouth (2023), Kargese (2024)
- John Durkan Memorial Punchestown Chase - (3) Min (2019), Galopin Des Champs (2022), Gaelic Warrior (2025)
- Herald Champion Novice Hurdle - (2) Blackstairmountain (2010), Facile Vega (2023)
- Irish Champion Hurdle - (4) Hurricane Fly (2011), State Man (2023, 2024, 2025)
- Irish Mirror Novice Hurdle - (8) Marasonnien (2012), Killultagh Vic (2015), Next Destination (2018), Galopin Des Champs (2021), The Nice Guy (2022), Gaelic Warrior (2023), Dancing City (2024), Jasmin De Vaux (2025)
- Mares Champion Hurdle -(8) Tarla (2010), Glens Melody (2013), Whiteout (2016), Benie Des Dieux (2018, 2019), Echoes In Rain (2023), Lossiemouth (2024), Jade De Grugy (2025)
- Mares Novice Hurdle Championship Final - (6) Adriana Des Mottes (2014), Laurina (2018), Brandy Love (2022), Ashroe Diamond (2023), Jade De Grugy (2024), Aurora Vega (2025)
- Morgiana Hurdle -(6) Faugheen (2017), Sharjah (2018), State Man (2022,2023), Lossiemouth (2025, 2026)
- Paddy Power Dial-A-Bet Chase - (3) Golden Silver (2009), Twinlight (2014), Chacun Pour Soi (2020)
- Punchestown Champion Chase -(6) Golden Silver (2010), Un de Sceaux (2019), Chacun Pour Soi (2021), Energumene (2022, 2023), Il Etait Temps (2026)
- Punchestown Champion Hurdle -(5) Hurricane Fly (2010), State Man (2023, 2024, 2025), Lossiemouth (2026)
- Racing Post Novice Chase - (3) Blackstairmountain (2011), Arvika Ligeonniere (2012), Ferny Hollow (2021)
- Royal Bond Novice Hurdle -(3) Hurricane Fly (2008), Zaidpour (2010), Nichols Canyon (2014)
- December Hurdle - (5) Hurricane Fly (2010), Unaccompanied (2011), State Man (2022, 2023), Lossiemouth (2025)
- Ryanair Novice Chase - (3) Energumene (2021), Blue Lord (2022), El Fabiolo (2023)
- Savills Chase - (2) Galopin Des Champs (2023, 2024)
- Slaney Novice Hurdle - (2) Mckinley (2015), Next Destination (2018)
- Spring Juvenile Hurdle - (3) Unaccompanied (2011), Mr Adjudicator (2018), Vauban (2022)
- Boylesports Gold Cup - (1) Galopin Des Champs (2022)
- BetVictor Champion Chase - (1) Haiti Couleurs (2026)

(United Kingdom) Great Britain

- Aintree Hurdle - (2) Impaire Et Passe (2024), Lossiemouth (2025)
- Anniversary 4-Y-O Juvenile Hurdle- (1) Murcia (2025)
- Clarence House Chase - (1) Un de Sceaux (2018)
- Kauto Star Novices' Chase - (1) Kitzbuhel (2025)
- King George VI Chase - (1) Banbridge (2024)
- Maghull Novices' Chase - (1) Douvan (2016)
- Manifesto Novices' Chase - (2) Il Etait Temps (2024), Impaire Et Passe (2025)
- Melling Chase - (1) Boston Bob (2014)
- Mildmay Novices' Chase - (1) Gold Dancer (2026)
- Mersey Novices' Hurdle - (1) Yorkhill (2016)
- Sefton Novices' Hurdle - (1) Dancing City (2024)
- Tingle Creek Chase - (1) Il Etait Temps (2025)
- Top Novices' Hurdle - (1) Salvator Mundi (2025)
- Grand National - (2) I Am Maximus (2024) (2026)

United States

- Iroquois Steeplechase – (1) Scaramanga (2023)

France

- Grande Course de Haies d'Auteuil - (1) Benie des Dieux (2019)
- Prix Alain du Breil - (1) Selma De Vary (2026)
