= Hurdling (horse race) =

Track and field event where horses jump over obstacles called hurdles or flights

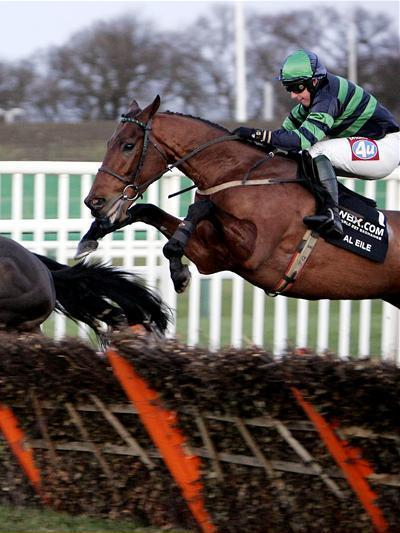
Tony Dobbin on Al Eile in the 2007 Fighting Fifth Hurdle.

A hurdle race in Great Britain and Ireland is a National Hunt horse race where the horses jump over obstacles called hurdles or flights that are over three and a half feet high. They are typically made of a series of panels made of brush and are flexible. Hurdle races always have a minimum of eight hurdles and a minimum distance of two miles (3.2 km).

National Hunt horses that have the size and scope to jump higher than the height of a hurdle use these types of races in order to gain experience of jumping obstacles so they can later be sent to jump bigger obstacles called fences. Hurdle races tend to be run at a faster pace than Chases as the height of the hurdle is much lower than a chasing fence. The best hurdlers have a low and efficient style of jumping, which means they do not lose much momentum when they run over or hurdle a hurdle.

Australian hurdle races were conducted over wooden fences which provide some flexibility when ran over or hurdled. In Victoria, these runs consist of portable hurdles in which the natural brush has been replaced by bright yellow soft synthetic brush. Hurdle races are usually run over a minimal distance of 2 800 metres. Victoria and South Australia were for a time the only two states in Australia that conduct jumping races but in 2022 the South Australian Government outlawed jumping races in the state (although racing authorities had already discontinued jumps racing due to a decline in local horse numbers). In 2021, the One Fit model of hurdles was introduced in Victoria, and they were being used in 13 tracks in UK.

== See also ==
- Steeplechasing
