= Call Equiname =

British-bred Thoroughbred racehorse

- Sire: Belfort
- Grandsire: Tyrant
- Dam: Cherry Season
- Damsire: Silly Season
- Sex: Gelding
- Foaled: 28 May 1990
- Country: United Kingdom
- Colour: Grey
- Breeder: Mrs L Steele
- Owner: Karen McLintock; Paul Barber et al
- Trainer: Don Eddy; Paul Nicholls
- Record: 21: 11-3-2
- Earnings: £176,866

Major wins
- Kennel Gate Novices' Hurdle (1995); Victor Chandler Chase (1999); Queen Mother Champion Chase (1999)

Call Equiname (foaled 28 May 1990) was a British Thoroughbred racehorse who competed under National Hunt rules. In a racing career frequently interrupted by injury he raced twenty-one times in eight seasons, winning eleven races. Despite an undistinguished pedigree, he showed promise in his early career, winning the Kennel Gate Novices' Hurdle in 1995. He reached his peak in the spring of 1999 when he won the Victor Chandler Chase and the Queen Mother Champion Chase. He was retired from racing in January 2001.

== Background ==
Call Equiname was a grey gelding bred in the United Kingdom by Mrs L Steele. He was by far the most notable horse sired by Belfort, a moderate racehorse and an obscure breeding stallion. Call Equinames dam, Cherry Season, won one minor race from fifteen starts in 1982 and 1983.

As a yearling, Call Equiname was sent to the Doncaster bloodstock sale in September 1991 and bought for 1,500 guineas by Don Eddy acting on behalf of Karen McLintock. Although it was originally intended to use the horse for dressage, he was trained for racing by Eddy at his stable at Black Heddon, Northumberland. According to the Encyclopedia of British Horse Racing, Equiname was a company set up to allow advertisers to name a horse without actually buying one and Call Equiname was intended to act as their "mobile advertisement".

Throughout his racing career, Call Equiname's efforts were compromised by a series of injury problems: the Racing Post described him as having "legs like glass and a heart of oak".

== Racing career ==
=== 1993/1994 season: National Hunt flat races ===
Call Equiname made his racecourse debut in a National Hunt Flat race at Musselburgh Racecourse on 7 January 1994. Starting at odds of 5/1 in a fourteen-runner field he accelerated clear of his opponents in the last three furlongs to win by fifteen lengths from Benbeath. After finishing second when favourite for a similar event at Doncaster Racecourse three weeks later he ended his first season in a National Hunt flat race at Ayr Racecourse in April. Starting the 7/4 favourite, he led from the start and won by six lengths from Sparky Gayle.

In May 1994 Call Equiname was sent back to the Doncaster sales and was bought for 64,000 guineas by Paul Nicholls who moved the gelding to his stable in Somerset. For the remainder of his racing career, Call Equiname was owned by Paul Barber in a variety of partnerships. In his early days at Nicholls's yard Call Equiname was extremely aggressive: according to Robin Oakley he was "almost certainly responsible" for the death of the highly promising chaser See More Indians (winner of the Feltham Novices' Chase) who was euthanised after his leg was "shattered" by a kick from Call Equiname.

=== 1994/1995 & 1995/1996 seasons: Novice hurdles ===
On 28 October 1994, Call Equiname made his first appearance as a hurdler in a novice event at Wetherby Racecourse. He jumped poorly and finished fourth of the nineteen runners behind Callisoe Bay. On his only other appearance of the season, he started favourite for a similar even at Newbury Racecourse in March but was beaten four lengths by the 66/1 outsider Raqib.

Having failed to win in the previous season, Call Equiname was still eligible to compete in novice hurdle events in the 1995/1996 campaign and had his most active season, racing seven times and ridden in all of his races by Tony McCoy. On 30 September 1995, he recorded his first win over obstacles when winning at Chepstow Racecourse, beating Speedwell Prince by half a length. He was then matched against more experienced hurdlers in a handicap race at the same course in November and finished unplaced behind Lightening Lad under top weight of 167 pounds. A week later, the gelding was then moved up in class for the Grade 2 Flowers Fine Ales Novices' Hurdle and finished second of the twelve runners behind the Josh Gifford-trained Mandy's Mantino. On 1 December, Call Equiname conceded ten pounds to nine opponents in a novices' event at Sandown Park Racecourse and won by four lengths from Crack On. Two weeks later Call Equiname started the 7/4 favourite for the Kennel Gate Novices' Hurdle at Ascot Racecourse. McCoy sent the favourite into the lead at the second last flight of hurdles and Call Equiname prevailed in a closely contested finish, winning by a neck and a short head from Speedwell Prince and Strong Promise.

On 23 February 1996 Call Equiname started 4/7 favourite for a novices' handicap at Kempton Park Racecourse. Carrying top weight of 162 pounds he took the lead at the fourth hurdle and drew away from his rivals to win by twenty lengths from Peace Lord. In March, Call Equiname ran for the first time at the Cheltenham Festival when he contested the Supreme Novices' Hurdle and started 10/1 fourth choice in the betting behind Castle Sweep, Kimanicky and Dance Beat. He was never in contention and finished eleventh of the twenty-seven runners behind the Jenny Pitman-trained Indefence.

=== 1996/1997 season: Novice chases ===
In the 1996/1997 season Call Equiname was campaigned in novice steeplechases and was unbeaten in an abbreviated campaign which comprised only two races. At Chepstow on 5 October he was ridden by Richard Dunwoody and started at odds of 4/5 for a two and a half mile novices' event. He won by eighteen lengths from Sonic Star, the only one of his three opponents to complete the course. Three weeks later in a similar event at Worcester Racecourse he was reunited with McCoy and won by one and a half lengths from Fine Thyne at odds of 8/13.

=== 1997/1998 & 1998/1999 seasons: Steeplechases ===
On his only appearance of the 1997/1998 season, Call Equiname was matched against more experienced chasers in the Mitsubishi Shogun Trophy Handicap Chase at Chaltenham on 14 November 1997. Ridden by Timmy Murphy, he took the lead at the second last fence and won by a length from Time Won't Wait.

When Call Equiname appeared for the Victor Chandler Chase at Kempton on 23 January 1999 he was running for only the second time in more than twenty-six months. Ridden by Robert Thornton he started at odds of 15/2 in a seven runner field. After being restrained by Thornton in the early stages he made progress from the seventh fence and took the lead from the favourite Get Real at the final fence. Get Real regained the advantage on the run-in, but Call Equiname rallied to retake the lead in the final strides to win by a neck.

On 17 March, three years after his previous appearance at the Festival, Call Equiname returned to Cheltenham to contest the Queen Mother Champion Chase. Ridden for the first time by Mick Fitzgerald, who was given the ride ahead of the less experienced table jockey Joe Tizzard he started the 7/2 second favourite behind Edredon Bleu in a thirteen runner field. The other contenders included Papillon, Direct Route (1998 Tingle Creek Trophy), Hill Society, Ask Tom (1997 Tingle Creek Trophy), Celibate (Game Spirit Chase), Mulligan (Arkle Novice Chase) and Or Royal (Arkle Challenge Trophy). Fitzgerald positioned the gelding towards the middle of the closely bunched field as Edredon Bleu set the pace. He jumped the second last in fourth but then made rapid progress on the rail on the final turn and entered the straight in second place before moving up to challenge the favourite at the final fence. Call Equiname overhauled Edredon Bleu a hundred yards from the finish and won by one and a quarter lengths, with Direct Route a further three and a half lengths back in third place. After the race Fitzgerald said "Any race here is good but when you win them they're even better. He was fantastic but he was stopping in front". Commenting on the horse's chronic leg problems, Nicolls said "Call Equiname has given us plenty of headaches and has been pin-fired, bar-fired and implanted." On the same subject, one of his co-owners said: "We bought him as a four-year-old, he's now nine and he's had bad shins for the last five years".

Call Equiname started the 11/10 favourite for the Melling Chase at Aintree Racecourse in April but after a making a jumping error at the fourth last fence he sustained his first defeat in over three years as he finished third behind Direct Route and Mulligan.

=== Later career ===
In November 1999 Call Equiname carried top weight of 164 pounds in the Murphy's Gold Cup over two and a half miles at Cheltenham and started the 3/1 favourite. He was never in contention and was tailed off when pulled up by Fitgerald four fences from the finish. According to the racecourse vet the horse was "distressed" after the race and was found to be suffering from an irregular heartbeat. When carrying 168 pounds in a handicap over the same course and distance in December, the gelding weakened badly in the closing stages and finished last of the four runners, again ending the race in a distressed condition. After a break of over ten months, Call Equiname returned in the Haldon Gold Cup at Exeter Racecourse on 31 October 2000 and finished third behind Bellator and Upgrade.

== Retirement ==
In January 2001 Call Equiname was retired from racing. Nicholls commented "On his day he was top-notch. He has been a great servant to us and a privilege to train, even if he has suffered from recurring injury problems".

== Pedigree ==
Pedigree of Call Equiname (GB), grey gelding, 1990
Sire Belfort (FR) 1977	Tyrant (USA); 1966	Bold Ruler	Nasrullah
Sire Belfort (FR) 1977	Tyrant (USA); 1966	Bold Ruler	Miss Disco
Sire Belfort (FR) 1977	Tyrant (USA); 1966	Anadem	My Babu
Sire Belfort (FR) 1977	Tyrant (USA); 1966	Anadem	Anne of Essex
Sire Belfort (FR) 1977	Belle de Retz (IRE); 1962	Gilles de Retz	Royal Charger
Sire Belfort (FR) 1977	Belle de Retz (IRE); 1962	Gilles de Retz	Ma Soeur Anne
Sire Belfort (FR) 1977	Belle de Retz (IRE); 1962	Abracadabra	Abernant
Sire Belfort (FR) 1977	Belle de Retz (IRE); 1962	Abracadabra	Malcolmia
Dam Cherry Season (GB) 1980	Silly Season (USA); 1962	Tom Fool	Menow
Dam Cherry Season (GB) 1980	Silly Season (USA); 1962	Tom Fool	Gaga
Dam Cherry Season (GB) 1980	Silly Season (USA); 1962	Double Deal	Straight Deal
Dam Cherry Season (GB) 1980	Silly Season (USA); 1962	Double Deal	Nonats
Dam Cherry Season (GB) 1980	Tudor Gus (GB); 1971	Gustav	Grey Sovereign
Dam Cherry Season (GB) 1980	Tudor Gus (GB); 1971	Gustav	Gamesmistress
Dam Cherry Season (GB) 1980	Tudor Gus (GB); 1971	Tudor Garth	Tudor Minstrel
Dam Cherry Season (GB) 1980	Tudor Gus (GB); 1971	Tudor Garth	Cherrygarth (Family: 1-t)
