= Vautour (horse) =

French-bred Thoroughbred racehorse

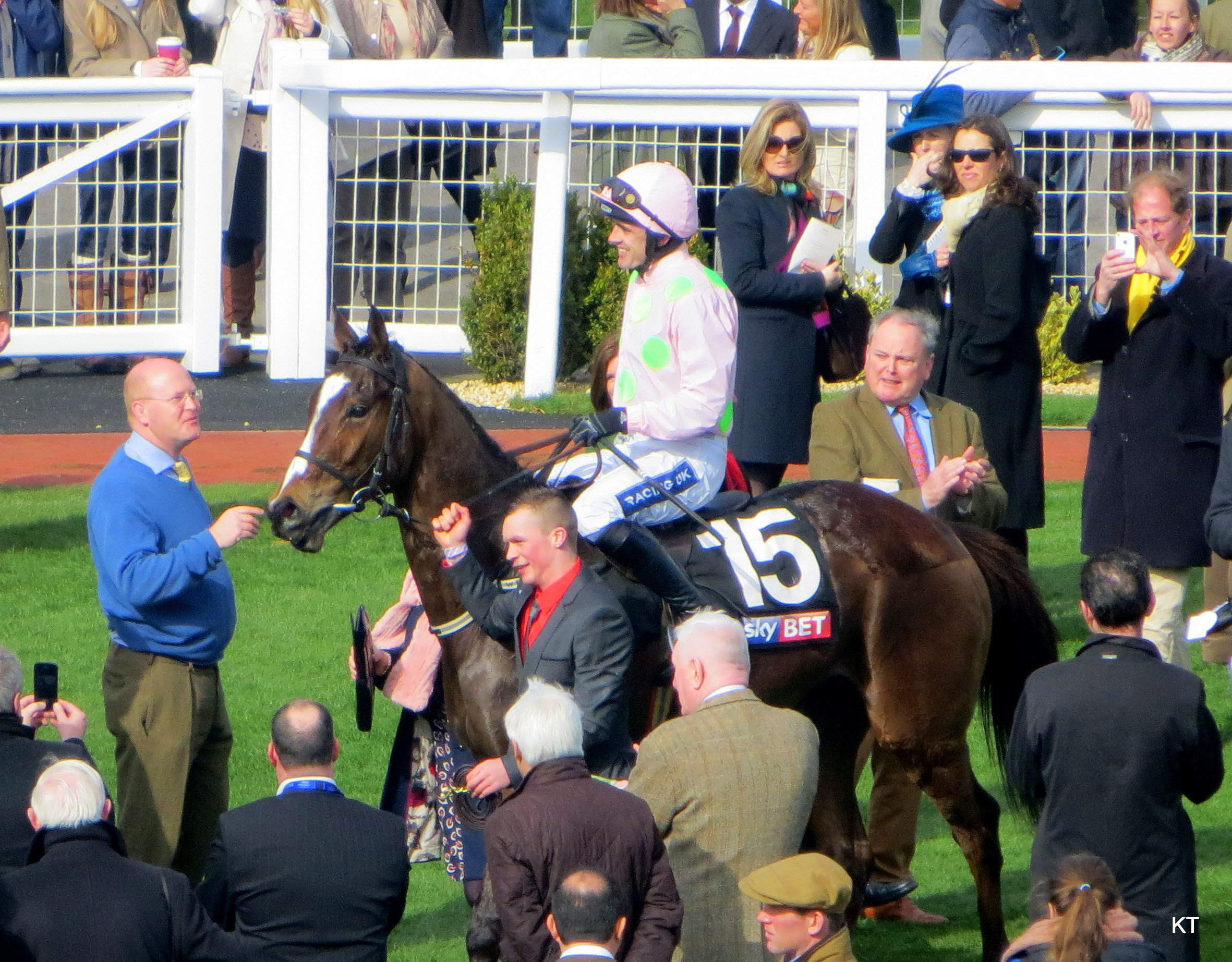
- Vautour at the 2014 Cheltenham Festival.
- Sire: Robin des Champs
- Grandsire: Garde Royale
- Dam: Gazelle de Mai
- Damsire: Dom Pasquini
- Sex: Gelding
- Foaled: 19 May 2009
- Country: France
- Colour: Bay
- Breeder: Haras de Saint Voir & Patrick Joubert
- Owner: Haras de Saint Voir & Patrick Joubert; Susannah Ricci
- Trainer: Guillaume Macaire; Willie Mullins
- Record: 16: 10-5-0; 9:5-3-0 (Chases); 7:5-2-0 (Hurdles)
- Earnings: £568,187

Major wins
- Moscow Flyer Novice Hurdle (2014); Deloitte Novice Hurdle (2014); Supreme Novices' Hurdle (2014); Tattersalls Champion Novice Hurdle (2014); Killiney Novice Chase (2015); JLT Novices' Chase (2015); 1965 Chase (2015); Ryanair Chase (2016)
- Last updated on 8 April 2016

Vautour (19 May 2009 – 6 November 2016) was a Thoroughbred racehorse who competed in National Hunt racing and won three times at the Cheltenham Festival. After beginning his racing career in France he moved to Ireland and made an immediate impact over hurdles in the spring of 2014 winning the Moscow Flyer Novice Hurdle, Deloitte Novice Hurdle, Supreme Novices' Hurdle and Tattersalls Champion Novice Hurdle.

When moved up to compete in steeplechases he added wins in the Killiney Novice Chase, JLT Novices' Chase, 1965 Chase and Ryanair Chase as well as finishing a close second in the King George VI Chase. He died after a paddock accident on 6 November 2016 at the age of seven.

== Background ==
Vautour was a bay gelding with a white blaze and white socks on his front feet bred in France by Haras De Saint Voir & Patrick Joubert. He was sired by the French stallion Robin des Champs, whose other progeny include Quevega and Sir Des Champs.

== Racing career ==
=== Early career in France ===
On his racecourse debut, Vautour contested a hurdle race for three-year-olds at Pau in December 2012 in which he finished second to Vizir d'Estruvel. At Auteuil Hippodrome in March, he again finished second, beaten six lengths by Black River. At the end of the season, Vautour was bought by Rich and Susannah Ricci and sent to Ireland to be trained by Willie Mullins.

=== 2013/2014 National Hunt season: Novice hurdles ===
On his Irish debut, Vautour started 1/2 for a thirty-runner maiden hurdle at Navan Racecourse in December and won by five and a half lengths. In January he was moved up in class for the Grade 2 Moscow Flyer Novice Hurdle at Punchestown Racecourse. Starting the 1/4 favourite, he was headed on the run-in by Western Boy but rallied to win by three quarters of a length. In the Grade 1 Deloitte Novice Hurdle at Leopardstown Racecourse he started second favourite behind The Tullow Tank, a six-year-old who had won the Royal Bond Novice Hurdle and the Paddypower.com Future Champions Novice Hurdle. Ruby Walsh sent Vautour into the lead from the start and went clear of his rivals before beating The Tullow Tank by three lengths.

On 11 March 2014, Vautour made his first appearance at the Cheltenham Festival when he contested the Supreme Novices' Hurdle. Ridden by Walsh, he started 7/2 joint-favourite alongside Irving who was unbeaten in his last five races including the Kennel Gate Novices' Hurdle and the Dovecote Novices' Hurdle. Vautour led for most of the way, accelerated approaching the last and won by six lengths from the Nicky Henderson-trained Josses Hill. On his final appearance of the season, the gelding started 1/3 favourite for the Grade 1 Tattersalls Ireland Champion Novice Hurdle at Punchestown and won by three and a half lengths from Apache Stronghold.

=== 2014/2015 National Hunt season: Novice chases ===
In the 2014/2015 National Hunt season Vautour was campaigned in Novice steeplechases. On his debut over the larger obstacles at Navan in November he started at odds of 2/11 and led all the way to win by eight lengths from the four-year-old Clarcam. The gelding then started 1/4 favourite in a six-runner field for the Grade 1 Racing Post Novice Chase at Leopardstown in December. After disputing the lead for most of the way he made a jumping error at the fifth last and tired in the closing stages before dead-heating for second, seventeen lengths behind Clarcam. Only two horses appeared to oppose Vautour when he contested the Group 2 Killiney Chase in January. His closest rival, Real Steel fell at the final fence, allowing Vautour to come home ninety-two lengths clear of Aladdin's Cave.

On 12 March 2015 Vautour won the JLT Novices' Chase at Cheltenham in impressive fashion marking him a main contender for next year's Gold Cup and received early quotes of 7–1 with race sponsor Betfred.

=== 2015/2016 National Hunt season ===
Vautour started a successful campaign by winning the 1965 Chase five-runner field on his seasonal reappearance. He was out in front for the entire race and the main challenger, three-times Grade 2 winner Ptit Zig, only came upside at the last fence but after a good jump Vautour went on to win by 2 lengths. His next start was on Boxing Day in the King George VI Chase where he made his debut against older horses at Grade 1 level. He travelled prominently and followed the pace set by the previous two-times winner of the race Silviniaco Conti until Vautour's jockey Ruby Walsh decided to send him into the lead at the start of the second circuit maintaining a strong tempo upfront. As they entered the final home straight Vautour was travelling the best but at the second last fence the favourite Don Cossack fell leaving only Cue Card to chase down Vautour with Al Ferof a further 5 lengths back in third. At the last fence the deficit between Cue Card and Vautour was down to one length but they both made a jumping error and a thrilling battle began up to the finish line with Vautour going all out to repel the challenge but in the end he was narrowly denied by a head.

Vautour then took part in the third straight Cheltenham Festival where he was sent the evens favourite for the 2016 renewal of the Ryanair Chase. He travelled strongly under usual race-rider Ruby Walsh and after a good round of jumping he won by 6 lengths from stablemate Valseur Lido. He came out only three weeks later at Aintree for the Melling Chase but failed to complete and fell at the ninth fence. He was next sent by trainer Willie Mullins for the first time in almost two years back down over the minimum trip of two miles, for the Punchestown Champion Chase where he met six rivals. After following the pace set by Special Tiara for most of the race, he started to make ground on the leader but going into the home straight he failed to show a turn of foot and was overtaken by Gods Own and Simonsig. He stayed on well after the last fence to regain the second spot finishing two lengths behind Gods Own, jockey Ruby Walsh reporting: "He was flat out the whole way over that trip".

On 6 November 2016 it was announced that Vautour had been euthanised. Willie Mullins explained "he was out in a paddock with another of our horses, Shaneshill – the two of them go out to the same paddock most days. We don't know what exactly happened – it must have been a freak accident – but when one of the girls went out to feed the horses Vautour was found with a broken front leg and our vet had no option but to put him down".

== Pedigree ==
Pedigree of Vautour (FR), bay gelding, 2009
Sire Robin des Champs (FR) 1997	Garde Royale (IRE); 1980	Mill Reef	Never Bend
Sire Robin des Champs (FR) 1997	Garde Royale (IRE); 1980	Mill Reef	Milan Mill
Sire Robin des Champs (FR) 1997	Garde Royale (IRE); 1980	Royal Way	Sicambre
Sire Robin des Champs (FR) 1997	Garde Royale (IRE); 1980	Royal Way	Right Way
Sire Robin des Champs (FR) 1997	Relayeuse (FR); 1987	Iron Duke	Sicambre
Sire Robin des Champs (FR) 1997	Relayeuse (FR); 1987	Iron Duke	Insulaire
Sire Robin des Champs (FR) 1997	Relayeuse (FR); 1987	Reliorneuse	El Relicario
Sire Robin des Champs (FR) 1997	Relayeuse (FR); 1987	Reliorneuse	Ordonneuse
Dam Gazelle de Mai (FR) 1989	Dom Pasquini (FR); 1980	Rheffic	Traffic
Dam Gazelle de Mai (FR) 1989	Dom Pasquini (FR); 1980	Rheffic	Rhenane
Dam Gazelle de Mai (FR) 1989	Dom Pasquini (FR); 1980	Boursonne	La Varende
Dam Gazelle de Mai (FR) 1989	Dom Pasquini (FR); 1980	Boursonne	Arctic Star
Dam Gazelle de Mai (FR) 1989	Mexia (FR); 1976	Sword Dancer	Sunglow
Dam Gazelle de Mai (FR) 1989	Mexia (FR); 1976	Sword Dancer	Highlland Fling
Dam Gazelle de Mai (FR) 1989	Mexia (FR); 1976	Kozmic Blues	Swaps
Dam Gazelle de Mai (FR) 1989	Mexia (FR); 1976	Kozmic Blues	Red Spy (Family 10-c)

- Through his sire, Vautour was inbred 4 × 4 to Sicambre, meaning that this stallion appears twice in the fourth generation of his pedigree.
