= Supreme Novices' Hurdle =

Hurdle horse race in Britain

Michael O'Sullivan Supreme Novices' Hurdle
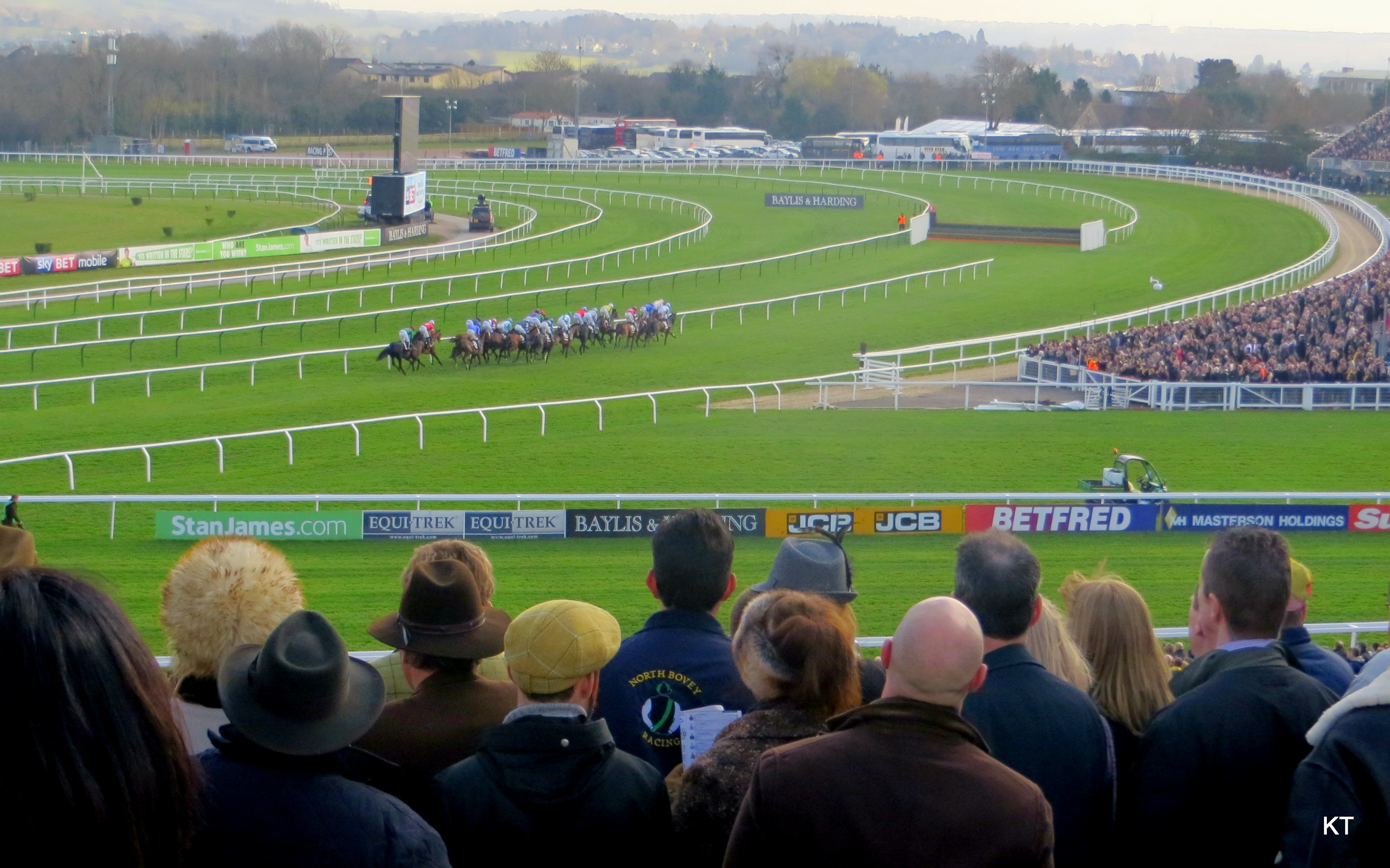
- The field head away from the stands in the 2014 running
- Class: Grade 1
- Location: Cheltenham Racecourse; Cheltenham, England
- Race type: Hurdle race
- Sponsor: Sky Bet
- Website: Cheltenham

Race information
- Distance: 2m 87y (3,298 metres)
- Surface: Turf
- Track: Left-handed
- Qualification: Four-years-old and up
- Weight: 10 st 11 lb (4yo); 11 st 7 lb (5yo+); Allowances; 7 lb for fillies and mares
- Purse: £150,000 (2025); 1st: £84,405

Supreme Novices' Hurdle
2026
Old Park Star	Sober Glory	Mydaddypaddy

Previous years
2025
Kopek Des Bordes	William Munny	Romeo Coolio
2024
Slade Steel	Mystical Power	Firefox
2023
Marine Nationale	Facile Vega	Diverge
2022
Constitution Hill	Jonbon	Kilcruit
2021
Appreciate It	Ballyadam	For Pleasure

2020-2011
2020
Shishkin	Abacadabras	Chantry House
2019
Klassical Dream	Thomas Darby	Itchy Feet
2018
Summerville Boy	Kalashnikov	Mengli Khan
2017
Labaik	Melon	River Wylde
2016
Altior	Min	Buveur D'air
2015
Douvan	Shaneshill	Sizing John
2014
Vautour	Josses Hill	Vaniteux
2013
Champagne Fever	My Tent Or Yours	Jezki
2012
Cinders And Ashes	Darlan	Trifolium
2011
Al Ferof	Spirit Son	Sprinter Sacre

2010-2001
2010
Menorah	Get Me Out of Here	Dunguib
2009
Go Native	Medermit	Somersby
2008
Captain Cee Bee	Binocular	Snap Tie
2007
Ebaziyan	Granit Jack	Amaretto Rose
2006
Noland	Straw Bear	Buena Vista
2005
Arcalis	Wild Passion	Dusky Warbler
2004
Brave Inca	War of Attrition	Fleet Street
2003
Back in Front	Kicking King	Chauvinist
2002
Like-A-Butterfly	Westender	In Contrast

2000-1991
2000
Sausalito Bay	Best Mate	Youlneverwalkalone
1999
Hors La Loi III	Joe Mac	Arctic Fancy
1998
French Ballerina	His Song	Gatflax
1997
Shadow Leader	Princeful	Nordic Breeze
1996
Indefence	Kimanicky	Castle Sweep
1995
Tourist Attraction	Ventana Canyon	Simple Arithmetic
1994
Arctic Kinsman	Pridwell	Dreams End
1993
Montelado	Lemon's Mill	Satin Lover
1992
Flown	Halkopous	Fortune And Fame
1991
Destriero	Granville Again	Gran Alba

1990-1988
1990
Forest Sun	Danny Harrold	Rakes Lane
1989
Sondrio	Island Set	Cruising Altitude
1988
Vagador	Mixed Blends	Relekto

The Supreme Novices' Hurdle is a Grade 1 National Hunt hurdle race in Great Britain which is open to horses aged four years or older. It is run on the Old Course at Cheltenham over a distance of about 2 miles and ½ furlong (2 miles and 87 yards, or 3,298 metres), and during its running there are eight hurdles to be jumped. The race is for novice hurdlers, and it is scheduled to take place each year during the Cheltenham Festival in March.

It is the first event on the opening day of the Festival, and its start is traditionally greeted by the "Cheltenham Roar", a loud cheer generated by the crowds of onlookers.

== History ==
The race was originally called the Gloucestershire Hurdle, and it used to be split into two or three separate divisions. The Irish trainer Vincent O'Brien recorded ten victories in the race during an eight-year spell in the 1950s.

It became known as the Lloyds Bank Champion Novices' Hurdle in 1974, when Lloyds Bank began a brief period of sponsorship. Its present title was introduced when Waterford Crystal started to back the race in 1978. This association continued until 1990, and since then the event has had several different sponsors. The current sponsor as of 2021 is the bookmaking company Sky Bet.

The 2025 running carried the name of Michael O'Sullivan, who rode the 2023 winner, Marine Nationale. O'Sullivan died from injuries sustained in a fall at Thurles in February 2025.

== Records ==
Leading jockey since 1972 (6 wins):

- Ruby Walsh – Noland (2006), Al Ferof (2011), Champagne Fever (2013), Vautour (2014), Douvan (2015), Klassical Dream (2019)

Leading trainer since 1972 (8 wins):

- Willie Mullins – Tourist Attraction (1995), Ebaziyan (2007), Champagne Fever (2013), Vautour (2014), Douvan (2015), Klassical Dream (2019), Appreciate It (2021), Kopek Des Bordes (2025)

== Winners since 1946 ==
- Separate divisions of the race indicated by (1), (2) and (3).

Year	Winner	Age	Jockey	Trainer
1946 (1)	Prince Rupert	5	Ron Smyth	Ted Smyth
1946 (2)	Freetown	6	George Archibald	William Larkin
1946 (3)	Gremlin	5	Phil Canty	George Todd
1947	Abandoned due to frost and snow
1948 (1)	Vulgan	5	Rickie Black	John de Moraville
1948 (2)	Jean's Last	6	Bryan Marshall	Fulke Walwyn
1949 (1)	French Wedding	4	Jimmy Brogan	Gerry Wilson
1949 (2)	Tough Guy	4	Denis Dillon	Ivor Anthony
1950 (1)	Tsaoko	5	Martin Molony	Sam Armstrong
1950 (2)	Sir Charles	4	Michael Scudamore (Note: amateur jockey)	Geoffrey Scudamore
1951 (1)	Red Stranger	4	Denis Dillon	Ron Smyth
1951 (2)	Oukileles II	4	Fred Winter	George Archibald
1952 (1)	Cockatoo	6	Phonsie O'Brien	Vincent O'Brien
1952 (2)	Evian	4	Fred Winter	George Archibald
1953 (1)	Assynt	5	Eddie Newman	Danny Morgan
1953 (2)	Dessin	7	Johnny Gilbert	Frank Hudson
1954 (1)	Stroller	6	Pat Taaffe	Vincent O'Brien
1954 (2)	Tasmin	4	René Emery	Henry Count
1955 (1)	Vindore	6	Phonsie O'Brien	Vincent O'Brien
1955 (2)	Illyric	6	Tommy Burns	Vincent O'Brien
1956 (1)	Boys Hurrah	8	Tommy Burns	Vincent O'Brien
1956 (2)	Pelargos	5	Tommy Burns	Vincent O'Brien
1957 (1)	Tokoroa	6	Dave Dick	Fred Rimell
1957 (2)	Saffron Tartan	6	Tommy Burns	Vincent O'Brien
1958 (1)	Admiral Stuart	7	Tommy Burns	Vincent O'Brien
1958 (2)	Prudent King	6	Tommy Burns	Vincent O'Brien
1959 (1)	York Fair	5	Tommy Burns	Vincent O'Brien
1959 (2)	Albergo	5	Doug Page	Clem Magnier
1960 (1)	Blue Mountain	6	Dick Broadway	George Todd
1960 (2)	Bastille	5	Bill Woods	Tom Masson
1961 (1)	Beau Normand	5	Bill Rees	Bob Turnell
1961 (2)	Greektown	5	Michael Scudamore	Willie Stephenson
1962 (1)	Tripacer	4	Tommy Carberry	Dan Moore
1962 (2)	Clerical Grey	4	Willie Robinson	P. Murphy
1963 (1)	Honour Bound	5	Terry Biddlecombe	Fred Rimell
1963 (2)	Buona Notte	6	Johnny Haine	Bob Turnell
1963 (3)	Deetease	5	Clive Chapman	Basil Foster
1964 (1)	Flyingbolt	5	Pat Taaffe	Tom Dreaper
1964 (2)	Elan	5	Dave Dick	John Sutcliffe
1965 (1)	Red Tears	5	Stan Mellor	Harry Thomson Jones
1965 (2)	Havago	6	Bobby Beasley	Paddy Sleator
1966 (1)	Beau Caprice	12	Tommy Jennings	Fulke Walwyn
1966 (2)	Fosco	5	David Moore	Mick Goswell
1967 (1)	Chorus	6	Johnny Haine	Harry Thomson Jones
1967 (2)	Early to Rise	7	Jeff King	Bob Turnell
1968 (1)	King Cutler	5	Brian Fletcher	Denys Smith
1968 (2)	L'Escargot	5	Tommy Carberry	Dan Moore
1969 (1)	Normandy	4	Terry Biddlecombe	Fred Rimell
1969 (2)	Private Room	5	Willie Robinson	Fulke Walwyn
1970 (1)	Ballywilliam Boy	5	Bobby Coonan	Paddy Sleator
1970 (2)	Bula	5	Paul Kelleway	Fred Winter
1971 (1)	Persian Majesty	4	Terry Biddlecombe	Ryan Price
1971 (2)	Barnard	7	Johnny Haine	Fulke Walwyn
1972	Noble Life	5	Tommy Murphy	Christy Grassick
1973	King Pele	4	David Nicholson	Gavin Pritchard-Gordon
1974	Avec Moi	5	Roger Rowell	Auriol Sinclair
1975	Bannow Rambler	6	Frank Berry	Padge Berry
1976	Beacon Light	5	Andrew Turnell	Bob Turnell
1977	Mac's Chariot	6	Dessie Hughes	Mick O'Toole
1978	Golden Cygnet	6	Mr Niall Madden	Edward O'Grady
1979	Stranfield	6	Tommy Kinane	Des McDonogh
1980	Slaney Idol	5	Tommy Carmody	Liam Browne
1981	Hartstown	6	Niall Madden	Mick O'Toole
1982	Miller Hill	6	Tom Morgan	Dessie Hughes
1983	Buck House	5	Tommy Carmody	Mouse Morris
1984	Browne's Gazette	6	Dermot Browne	Michael Dickinson
1985	Harry Hastings	6	Chris Grant	John Wilson
1986	River Ceiriog	5	Steve Smith Eccles	Nicky Henderson
1987	Tartan Tailor	6	Phil Tuck	Gordon W. Richards
1988	Vagador	5	Mark Perrett	Guy Harwood
1989	Sondrio	8	Jonothan Lower	Martin Pipe
1990	Forest Sun	5	Jimmy Frost	Toby Balding
1991	Destriero	5	Pat McWilliams	Andy Geraghty
1992	Flown	5	Jamie Osborne	Nicky Henderson
1993	Montelado	6	Charlie Swan	Pat Flynn
1994	Arctic Kinsman	6	Carl Llewellyn	Nigel Twiston-Davies
1995	Tourist Attraction	7	Mark Dwyer	Willie Mullins
1996	Indefence	5	Warren Marston	Jenny Pitman
1997	Shadow Leader	6	Jamie Osborne	Charles Egerton
1998	French Ballerina	5	Graham Bradley	Pat Flynn
1999	Hors La Loi III	4	Tony McCoy	Martin Pipe
2000	Sausalito Bay	6	Paul Carberry	Noel Meade
2001	Abandoned due to a foot-and-mouth outbreak
2002	Like-A-Butterfly	8	Charlie Swan	Christy Roche
2003	Back in Front	6	Norman Williamson	Edward O'Grady
2004	Brave Inca	6	Barry Cash	Colm Murphy
2005	Arcalis	5	Graham Lee	Howard Johnson
2006	Noland	5	Ruby Walsh	Paul Nicholls
2007	Ebaziyan	6	Davy Condon	Willie Mullins
2008	Captain Cee Bee	7	Robert Thornton	Eddie Harty
2009	Go Native	6	Paul Carberry	Noel Meade
2010	Menorah	5	Richard Johnson	Philip Hobbs
2011	Al Ferof	6	Ruby Walsh	Paul Nicholls
2012	Cinders And Ashes	5	Jason Maguire	Donald McCain
2013	Champagne Fever	6	Ruby Walsh	Willie Mullins
2014	Vautour	5	Ruby Walsh	Willie Mullins
2015	Douvan	5	Ruby Walsh	Willie Mullins
2016	Altior	6	Nico de Boinville	Nicky Henderson
2017	Labaik	6	Jack Kennedy	Gordon Elliott
2018	Summerville Boy	6	Noel Fehily	Tom George
2019	Klassical Dream	5	Ruby Walsh	Willie Mullins
2020	Shishkin	6	Nico de Boinville	Nicky Henderson
2021	Appreciate It	7	Paul Townend	Willie Mullins
2022	Constitution Hill	5	Nico de Boinville	Nicky Henderson
2023	Marine Nationale	6	Michael O'Sullivan	Barry Connell
2024	Slade Steel	6	Rachael Blackmore	Henry de Bromhead
2025	Kopek Des Bordes	5	Paul Townend	Willie Mullins
2026	Old Park Star	6	Nico de Boinville	Nicky Henderson

== See also ==
- Horse racing in Great Britain
- List of British National Hunt races
