= Winter Bumper =

National Hunt flat horse race in Britain

Winter Bumper
2026
| A Likeable Rogue | Get Out Of My Way | Trojan Tale |

Previous years
2025
Sober Glory | Realco | Baron Noir
2024
Royal Infantry | Noahsgreatrainbow | I'm A Lumberjack
2023
Aslukgoes | Masaccio | Shinji
2022
Top Dog | Rosy Redrum | Ballyglass
2021
Good Risk At All | I Like To Move It | Gelino Bello

2020-2011
2020
Ocean Wind | Brief Ambition | Champagnesuperover
2018
Acey Milan | Woulduadamandeveit | Good Boy Bobby
2017
Daphne Du Clos | Western Ryder | Dans Le Vent
2016
Ballyandy | Positively Dylan | Gayebury
2015
Barters Hill | Buveur D'air | Altior
2014
Definitely Red | Tea For Two | Mountain of Mourne
2013
Oscar Rock | Vago Collonges | Caledonia
2012
Shutthefrontdoor | Village Vic | Horatio Hornblower
2011
Ericht | Bygones in Brid | Peckhamecho

2010–2001
2010
Al Ferof | Made in Time | Carpincho
2008
Mad Max | The Nightingale | Midnight Sail
2007
Crocodiles Rock | Just A Thought | Earth Planet
2005
Karanja | Be Be King | De Soto
2004
Earth Man | Netherley | Dusky Lord
2003
Cornish Rebel | Cloudy Grey | Sixo
2002
Iris's Gift | Harrovian | Karinga City
2001
Redde | Armageddon | One Knight

2000–1996
2000
Patriarch | Ready To Rumble | Royal Emperor
1999
Golden Alpha | No Forecast | Frenchman's Creek
1998
Frantic Tan | Luggsy | Mr Music Man
1997
Mr Markham | Dom Beltrano | Arkley Royal
1996
Andanito | Three Farthings | Simple Simon I

The Winter Bumper is a Listed National Hunt flat race in Great Britain which is open to horses aged four to six years. It is run at Newbury over a distance of about 2 miles and 1/2 furlong (2 miles and 69 yards, or 3,282 metres), and it is scheduled to take place each year in February.

The first version of the race was established in 1996, and it was given Grade 2 status in 2002. The title Winter Bumper was introduced ahead of the planned running in 2009, but this race was cancelled because of snow. Prior to this it was known by various titles, usually the name of a sponsor appended with "Standard Open National Hunt Flat Race". Since 2018 the race has been sponsored by Betfair with various different titles.

The event serves as a trial for the Champion Bumper in March, although no horse has ever achieved victory in both races. However, the winner of the latter event in 1999, Monsignor, had earlier finished fourth in this race.

== Records ==
Leading jockey (3 wins):

- Tony McCoy – Golden Alpha (1999), Crocodiles Rock (2007), Shutthefrontdoor (2012)

Leading trainer (3 wins):

- Jonjo O'Neill – Iris's Gift (2002), Crocodiles Rock (2007), Shutthefrontdoor (2012)
- Nicky Henderson - Mad Max (2008), Ericht (2011), Daphne Du Clos (2017)

== Winners ==
| Year | Winner | Age | Jockey | Trainer |
|---|---|---|---|---|
| 1996 | Andanito | 5 | Jamie Osborne | Lady Herries |
| 1997 | Mr Markham | 5 | Philip Hide | Josh Gifford |
| 1998 | Frantic Tan | 6 | Martin Keighley | Nigel Twiston-Davies |
| 1999 | Golden Alpha | 5 | Tony McCoy | Martin Pipe |
| 2000 | Patriarch | 4 | Norman Williamson | Mark Pitman |
| 2001 | Redde | 6 | Brian Crowley | Jack Smith |
| 2002 | Iris's Gift | 5 | Ben Hitchcott | Jonjo O'Neill |
| 2003 | Cornish Rebel | 6 | Ruby Walsh | Paul Nicholls |
| 2004 | Secret Ploy | 4 | Timmy Murphy | Hughie Morrison |
| 2005 | Karanja | 6 | Nina Carberry (Note: amateur jockey) | Victor Dartnall |
| | no race 2006 (Note: The race was abandoned in 2006 due to frost) |
| 2007 | Crocodiles Rock | 5 | Tony McCoy | Jonjo O'Neill |
| 2008 | Mad Max | 6 | Mick Fitzgerald | Nicky Henderson |
| | no race 2009 (Note: The 2009 running was cancelled because of snow) |
| 2010 | Al Ferof | 5 | Ruby Walsh | Paul Nicholls |
| 2011 | Ericht | 5 | Barry Geraghty | Nicky Henderson |
| 2012 | Shutthefrontdoor | 5 | Tony McCoy | Jonjo O'Neill |
| 2013 | Oscar Rock | 5 | Noel Fehily | Harry Fry |
| 2014 | Definitly Red | 5 | Jason Maguire | Steve Gollings |
| 2015 | Barters Hill | 5 | David Bass | Ben Pauling |
| 2016 | Ballyandy | 5 | Sam Twiston-Davies | Nigel Twiston-Davies |
| 2017 | Daphne Du Clos | 4 | Sean Bowen | Nicky Henderson |
| 2018 | Acey Milan | 4 | Brian Hughes | Anthony Honeyball |
| | no race 2019 (Note: The 2019 race was cancelled because of an equine influenza outbreak) |
| 2020 | Ocean Wind | 4 | Aidan Coleman | Roger Teal |
| 2021 | Good Risk At All | 5 | Tom Scudamore | Sam Thomas |
| 2022 | Top Dog | 5 | Thomas Bellamy | Emma Lavelle |
| 2023 | Aslukgoes | 5 | Jack Quinlan | Ben Brookhouse |
| 2024 | Royal Infantry | 5 | Harry Skelton | Dan Skelton |
| 2025 | Sober Glory | 5 | Micheal Nolan | Philip Hobbs & Johnson White |
| 2026 | A Likeable Rogue | 5 | Brian Hughes | John Dawson |

== See also ==
- Horse racing in Great Britain
- List of British National Hunt races
