= Castleshane =

Castleshane can refer to:

- Castleshane, County Monaghan, a village in County Monaghan, Ireland
- Castleshane (racehorse), a racehorse in Lincolnshire, England
