= 1965 Chase =

Steeplechase horse race in Britain

- Class: Grade 2
- Location: Ascot Racecourse; Ascot, England
- Inaugurated: 2006
- Race type: Steeplechase
- Sponsor: Ladbrokes Coral
- Website: Ascot

Race information
- Distance: 2m 5f 18y (4,236 metres)
- Surface: Turf
- Track: Right-handed
- Qualification: Four-years-old and up
- Weight: 10 st 9 lb (4yo); 11 st 4 lb (5yo+); Allowances; 7 lb for fillies & mares
- Purse: £80,000 (2025); 1st: £45,560

1965 Chase
2025
| Jango Baie | Gidleigh Park | Pic D'Orhy |

Previous years
2024
Pic D'Orhy | Hidden Depths | Dashel Drasher
2023
Pic D'Orhy | Straw Fan Jack | Minella Drama
2022
Coole Cody | Saint Calvados | Only two ran
2021
Lostintranslation | Master Tommytucker | Dashel Drasher

2020-2011
2020
Imperial Aura | Itchy Feet | Real Steel
2019
Cyrname | Altior | Solomon Grey
2018
Politologue | Charbel | Gold Present
2017
Top Notch | Double Shuffle | Frodon
2016
Royal Regatta | Kylemore Lough | God's Own
2015
Vautour | Ptit Zig | Third Intention
2014
Al Ferof | Somersby | Wishfull Thinking
2013
Al Ferof | French Opera | Only two ran
2012
Captain Chris | For Non Stop | Ghizao
2011
Master Minded | Somersby | Medermit

2010-2001
2010
Master Minded | I'msingingtheblues | Panjo Bere
2009
Albertas Run | Planet of Sound | Voy Por Ustedes
2008
My Petra | Oceanos des Obeaux | Mahogany Blaze
2007
Howle Hill | Fier Normand | Mister Quasimodo
2006
Cerium | Knowhere | Hoo La Baloo
2004
Massac | Mondial Jack | Latitude
2003
Iris Royal | Le Roi Miguel | Tarxien
2001
Wahiba Sands | Best Mate | Dusk Duel

2000-1991
2000
Upgrade | Bellator | Blowing Wind
1999
Nordance Prince | Dark Stranger | Nicholls Cross
1998
Red Marauder | Chief's Song | Northern Starlight
1997
Simply Dashing | Fine Thyne | Or Royal
1996
Strong Promise | Major Bell | Southampton
1995
Sound Man | Dancing Paddy | Postage Stamp
1994
Raymylette | Couldnt Be Better | Beachy Head
1992
Deep Sensation | Danny Harrold | Bradbury Star
1991
Kings Fountain | Far Senior | Tipping Tim

1990-1988
1990
Blazing Walker | Full Strength | Multum in Parvo
1989
Man O'Magic | Ghofar | Biloxi Blues
1988
Saffron Lord | Four Trix | Southernair

The 1965 Chase is a Grade 2 National Hunt steeplechase in Great Britain which is open to horses aged four years or older. It is run at Ascot over a distance of about 2 miles and 5 furlongs (2 miles 5 furlongs and 13 yards, or 4,236 metres), and during its running there are seventeen fences to be jumped. The race is scheduled to take place each year in November.

The event is sponsored by Ladbrokes Coral, and it commemorates 1965, the inaugural year of jump racing at Ascot. It was established in 2006, and it was originally a limited handicap. It became a conditions race in 2009 and has previously been sponsored by Amlin, Stella Artois, Christy, CopyBet and Chanelle Pharma. Prior to 2015 it was run over 2 miles and 3 furlongs.

The race was run from 1994 to 2004 as the First National Gold Cup, a limited handicap over 2 miles and 4 furlongs which was restricted to horses in their first or second season of steeplechasing. Prior to this the race had been known as the H & T Walker Gold Cup.

== Records ==
Most successful horse (2 wins):

- Master Minded – 2010, 2011
- Al Ferof – 2013, 2014
- Pic D'Orhy - 2023, 2024

Leading jockey (3 wins):

- Richard Dunwoody - Church Warden (1986), Sound Man (1995), Simply Dashing (1997)
- Tony McCoy – Upgrade (2000), Wahiba Sands (2001), Albertas Run (2009)
- Harry Cobden - Cyrname (2019), Pic D'Orhy (2023, 2024)

Leading trainer (9 wins):

- Paul Nicholls – Cerium (2006), Master Minded (2010, 2011), Al Ferof (2013, 2014), Politologue (2018), Cyrname (2019), Pic D'Orhy (2023, 2024)

== Winners ==
| Year | Winner | Age | Jockey | Trainer |
|---|---|---|---|---|
| 1981 | Wayward Lad | 6 | Robert Earnshaw | Michael Dickinson |
| 1982 | Pay Related | 8 | Jonjo O'Neill | Peter Easterby |
| 1983 | The Tsarevich | 7 | John White | Nicky Henderson |
| 1984 | Cybrandian | 6 | Alan Brown | Peter Easterby |
| 1985 | Very Promising | 7 | Peter Scudamore | David Nicholson |
| 1986 | Church Warden | 7 | Richard Dunwoody | David Murray-Smith |
| 1987 | Weather The Storm | 7 | Tom Taaffe | Arthur Moore |
| 1988 | Saffron Lord | 6 | Richard Rowe | Josh Gifford |
| 1989 | Man O'Magic | 8 | Mark Perrett | Kim Bailey |
| 1990 | Blazing Walker | 6 | Chris Grant | Arthur Stephenson |
| 1991 | Kings Fountain | 8 | Anthony Tory | Kim Bailey |
| 1992 | Deep Sensation | 7 | Declan Murphy | Josh Gifford |
| 1993 | Abandoned due to frost |
| 1994 | Raymylette | 7 | Mick Fitzgerald | Nicky Henderson |
| 1995 | Sound Man | 7 | Richard Dunwoody | Edward O'Grady |
| 1996 | Strong Promise | 5 | Kieran Gaule | Geoff Hubbard |
| 1997 | Simply Dashing | 6 | Richard Dunwoody | Tim Easterby |
| 1998 | Red Marauder | 8 | Richard Guest | Norman Mason |
| 1999 | Nordance Prince | 8 | Richard Johnson | Venetia Williams |
| 2000 | Upgrade | 6 | Tony McCoy | Martin Pipe |
| 2001 | Wahiba Sands | 8 | Tony McCoy | Martin Pipe |
| 2002 | Abandoned due to waterlogging |
| 2003 | Iris Royal | 7 | Marcus Foley | Nicky Henderson |
| 2004 (Note: The 2004 running took place at Windsor) | Massac | 5 | Robert Thornton | Alan King |
| 2005 | Abandoned due to frost |
| 2006 | Cerium | 5 | Sam Thomas | Paul Nicholls |
| 2007 | Howle Hill | 7 | Jimmy McCarthy | Alan King |
| 2008 | My Petra | 5 | Barry Geraghty | Nicky Henderson |
| 2009 | Albertas Run | 8 | Tony McCoy | Jonjo O'Neill |
| 2010 | Master Minded | 7 | Noel Fehily | Paul Nicholls |
| 2011 | Master Minded | 8 | Daryl Jacob | Paul Nicholls |
| 2012 | Captain Chris | 8 | Richard Johnson | Philip Hobbs |
| 2013 | Al Ferof | 8 | Daryl Jacob | Paul Nicholls |
| 2014 | Al Ferof | 9 | Ruby Walsh | Paul Nicholls |
| 2015 | Vautour | 6 | Ruby Walsh | Willie Mullins |
| 2016 | Royal Regatta | 8 | Tom O'Brien | Philip Hobbs |
| 2017 | Top Notch | 6 | Nico de Boinville | Nicky Henderson |
| 2018 | Politologue | 7 | Sam Twiston-Davies | Paul Nicholls |
| 2019 | Cyrname | 7 | Harry Cobden | Paul Nicholls |
| 2020 | Imperial Aura | 7 | David Bass | Kim Bailey |
| 2021 | Lostintranslation | 9 | Brendan Powell | Colin Tizzard |
| 2022 | Coole Cody | 11 | Adam Wedge | Evan Williams |
| 2023 | Pic D'Orhy | 8 | Harry Cobden | Paul Nicholls |
| 2024 | Pic D'Orhy | 9 | Harry Cobden | Paul Nicholls |
| 2025 | Jango Baie | 6 | Nico de Boinville | Nicky Henderson |
| 2026 | Blow Your Wad | 8 | Freddie Mitchell | Jamie & Josh Moore |

== See also ==
- Horse racing in Great Britain
- List of British National Hunt races
