= Golden Cygnet =

Irish-bred Thoroughbred racehorse

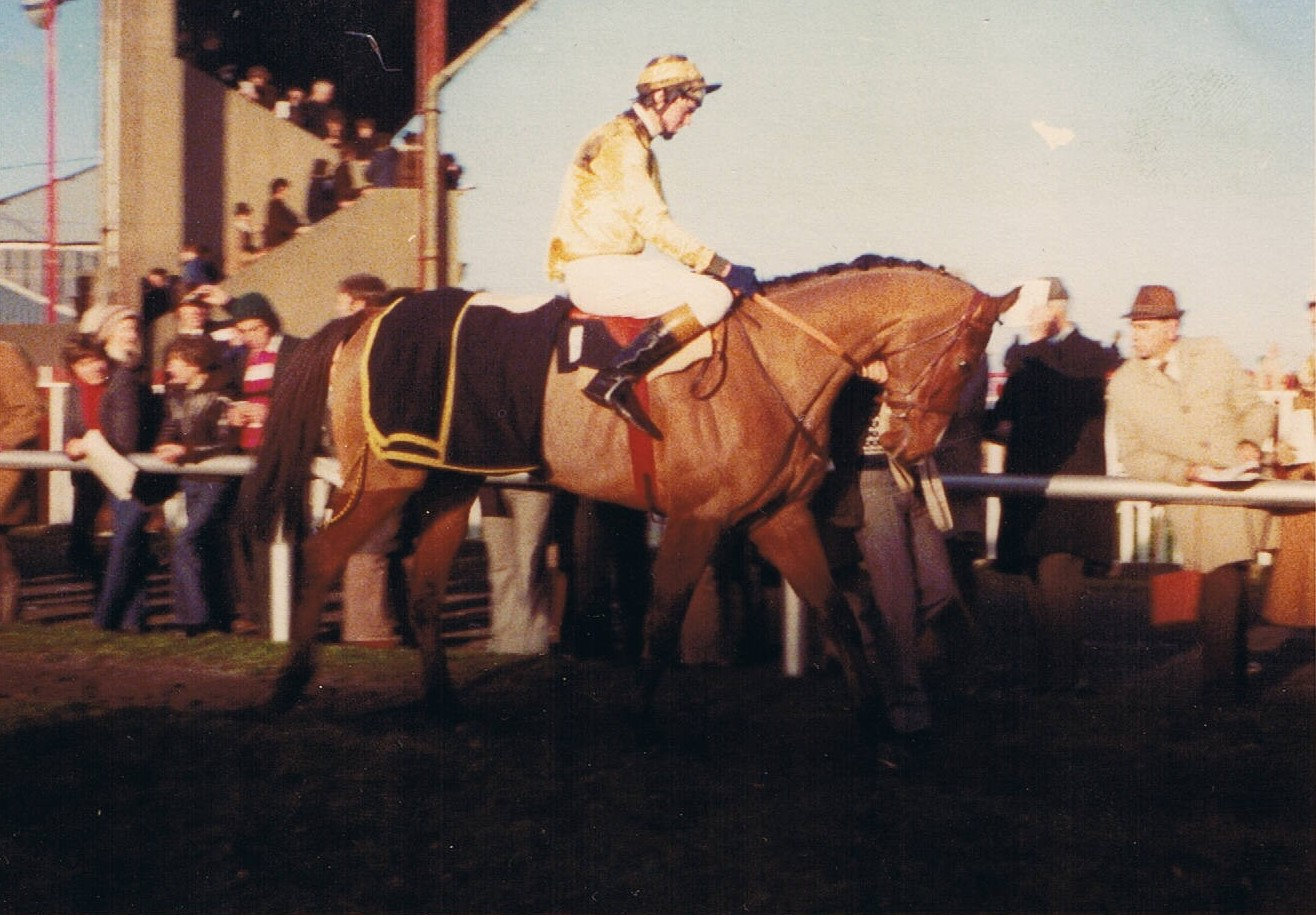
- Golden Cygnet & Niall Madden at Naas before the Slaney Hurdle in January 1978
- Sire: Deep Run
- Grandsire: Pampered King
- Dam: Golden Cygneture
- Damsire: Golden Vision
- Sex: Gelding
- Foaled: 21 June 1972
- Country: Ireland
- Colour: Bay
- Breeder: John T O'Brien
- Owner: Ray Rooney
- Trainer: Edward O'Grady
- Record: 7: 6-0-0 (hurdles)

Major wins
- Supreme Novices' Hurdle (1978); Slaney Hurdle (1978); Fingal Hurdle (1978)

Honours
- Timeform Champion Novice Hurdler 1977/78; Golden Cygnet Novice Hurdle

Golden Cygnet (1972 – 1978) was a racehorse who was described in the 1979 Irish Racing Annual by legendary Irish trainer Vincent O'Brien as "the best hurdler I've ever seen." His hurdling career lasted less than 5 months, as a result of the fatal injury he sustained in the 1978 Scottish Champion Hurdle.

== Lineage ==
Golden Cygnet, a bay gelding, was born on 21 June 1972, which made him a very late foal in bloodstock terms (although barely 6 months old on 1 January 1973, he was officially a yearling). He was from the first crop of Deep Run – who would prove to be the best National Hunt sire of his era by becoming Champion Jumps Sire for 14 consecutive seasons – and his dam (mother) was the unraced Golden Vision mare Golden Cygneture. Golden Cygnet turned out to be the only foal of his dam. His grand-dam My Cygneture was also unraced and had only two foals apart from Golden Cygneture, both of which were colts with one of them being a minor winner.

== Early career ==
Golden Cygnet was sent to Goffs November Sales as an unbroken 3-year-old in 1975, where he was bought by trainer Edward O'Grady for 980 guineas.

He began his racing career as a 4-year-old in a flat maiden over 2 miles at Leopardstown in June 1976. He was well supported in the betting market (7/1 to 3/1) and although he won the race, he was disqualified for causing interference inside the final furlong and placed second. His next run was in a national hunt flat race at Roscommon where he was a fast-finishing third, beaten less than a length before signing off for the year with an 8-length win at Naas in a one-and-a-half mile flat maiden for amateur riders in early October.

It was almost a year before Golden Cygnet appeared on the racetrack again, finishing last in a flat handicap over 2 miles at Listowel in September 1977 before heading to Punchestown the following month for another handicap over a trip that was short of ideal (9 furlongs). The form book noted; 'never placed to challenge, some late progress.' Following this run, he contested the Leopardstown November Handicap and was heavily supported in the betting market (20/1 to 7/2). With only 7 st 7 lbs to carry, the leading British-based lightweight jockey, Richard Fox, was booked for the ride. However, Golden Cygnet failed to settle in the early stages of the race and was in front with half a mile to run before fading in the straight to finish seventh. This being the last day of the flat season, Golden Cygnet's sights were then switched to hurdling.

== Hurdling career ==
His first appearance over hurdles came at Clonmel on 8 December 1977 where he was ridden by 18-year-old amateur Niall Madden, who had ridden him to his only victory on the flat and was to ride him in all of his hurdle races. He won by 3 lengths (Form Book: 11/10 Fav, soon in touch, 2nd after 3 out, led between last two, ran on well). His next appearance was at Leopardstown on Saint Stephen's Day in the Sean Graham Roundwood Hurdle, a 'winners' hurdle for which he started favourite at 6/4. Having been held up off the pace early on, he gradually made progress to join the leaders approaching the straight. At this stage, he was travelling so well that Madden was struggling to restrain him. As soon as he loosened his grip, the horse pulled clear on the run to the final hurdle and stretched away to win by 20 lengths (Form Book: 6/4 Fav, waited with, improved to 4th 3 out, joined leader cantering entering straight, soon led, drew clear, impressive).

So easily had Golden Cygnet won at Leopardstown that his trainer Edward O'Grady decided to let him take his chance in the Slaney Hurdle at Naas only 12 days later. He won again but was not as impressive as his starting price suggested, and he also had to survive a stewards' inquiry into possible interference. (Form Book: 4/6 Fav, mid-division & waited with, improved when mistake 4 out, 5th 3 out, led from next, edged right at last, ran on well). O'Grady intimated afterwards that he may have run him too soon after Leopardstown and he planned to give him a break. He was given all the time he needed and did not re-appear until 25 February, exactly 7 weeks later. His target was the Fournoughts Hurdle at Punchestown, a trial for the Supreme Novices' Hurdle at the Cheltenham Festival. He travelled well throughout the race and settled it in a matter of strides when he swept past the leader approaching the final hurdle to win with the minimum of fuss. (Form Book: 4/7 Fav, always close up, 2nd 2 out, led on bridle entering straight, went clear before last, easily).

Golden Cygnet started the Supreme Novices' Hurdle at Cheltenham as the 4/5 favourite and as soon as he was asked to make his move at the top of the hill with 3 to jump, he began to take a strong hold. Once he jumped the second last, Madden let him go and he shot clear, flew the final hurdle, and sprinted up the hill to win by 15 lengths from Western Rose in a faster time than the Champion Hurdle, which would take place one hour later. (Form Book: 4/5 Fav, always going easily, led 2 out, went clear flat, impressive). Timeform's 'Chasers & Hurdlers' recorded that "he toyed with his seventeen rivals....pulling over his field and striding majestically up the final hill to win running away by fifteen lengths. The others might as well have stayed in their boxes." Trainer of the runner-up Fred Rimell was astonished at the performance of the winner and told reporters afterwards that he had "never seen a horse win so easily at the Festival." Golden Cygnet was immediately installed as favourite for the 1979 Champion Hurdle.

Golden Cygnet ran twice more. First, he headed to the Fairyhouse Easter Festival for the Fingal Hurdle, a race for the best novices in Ireland. As in previous races, he had little difficulty in disposing of his eight opponents, coming home to win eased down by 10 lengths (Form Book: 2/7 Fav, waited with, 2nd 4 out, disputed lead approaching next, soon led, quickened clear approaching last, impressive). It was expected to be his last race of the season, but he was so well in himself afterwards that connections decided to enter him in the Scottish Champion Hurdle at Ayr 18 days later.

== Last race ==
The Scottish Champion Hurdle represented a huge step up in grade. Until now, Golden Cygnet had been taking on fellow novices. At Ayr, he faced very experienced hurdlers of the highest class. It was also a handicap. In most years, a Cheltenham-winning novice could expect to receive up to 10 lbs or more in weight from their more experienced championship rivals, especially from the likes of Night Nurse, the Champion Hurdle winner in 1976 & 1977, and Sea Pigeon who went on to win the Champion Hurdle in 1980 & 1981. However, the handicapper allotted Golden Cygnet 11 st 13 lbs, which was 5 lbs more than dual champion Night Nurse, 7 lbs more than Beacon Light, who had been fourth in the Champion Hurdle the previous month, and 12 lbs more than Decent Fellow, winner of the Irish Sweeps Handicap Hurdle under 11–4. The only horse with a higher weight was Sea Pigeon, who was asked to carry just 1 lb more, having finished a close second to Monksfield in the previous month's Champion Hurdle.

The race went according to plan most of the way. Having been held up early on, Golden Cygnet moved into third place as they came to the second last hurdle. Approaching the final flight, he moved alongside the leader Night Nurse travelling very strongly and looked an assured winner, but he did not lift his front legs high enough and crashed through the hurdle, somersaulting on his head before hitting the ground. Fortunately, Madden was thrown clear and although shaken, he was uninjured. Sea Pigeon went on to win the race, catching Night Nurse close home. "I was cantering on him," said Madden afterwards. "Still cruising. He had jumped brilliantly, never touched a hurdle. And then for some reason, he stood off a bit too far at the last and he just clipped the top of it and came down on his neck." Racing's highly respected judges 'Timeform' stated in their 1977/1978 Annual:

"The race confirmed two important points – that Sea Pigeon had no superior among the established hurdlers apart from Monksfield, and that all the superlatives heaped on Golden Cygnet had been justified.... Golden Cygnet appeared to have plenty left, and was two lengths up on Sea Pigeon and about to take the lead from Night Nurse when he suffered his fatal fall. Judging by the way Golden Cygnet finished in his previous races, he would have taken some catching.....The connections of Sea Pigeon did not dispute the general feeling afterwards that Golden Cygnet would have beaten Sea Pigeon in the Scottish Champion Hurdle if he had not come to grief at the last. And for a novice to have defeated a seasoned campaigner of Sea Pigeon's calibre at a difference of only 1 lb would have been a staggering achievement."

The compilers of the form book commented (7/4 JF, waited with, improved approaching 2 out, quickened between last two, disputed & looked winner when fell last) .

Golden Cygnet eventually got back to his feet after the fall and appeared to be in relatively good shape, although dazed and sore. A long period of rest over the summer seemed to be all that was required. However, trainer Edward O'Grady was not 100% happy with the horse's condition. A lump had developed on his neck which appeared to be some form of haematoma but O'Grady was worried that it might be something more serious. After consulting the racecourse vet, he decided as a precaution to send the horse to the veterinary unit at the University of Edinburgh for a couple of days to be sure that everything was OK before allowing him to travel home. When he was contacted by the university the following day (Sunday), everything appeared to be fine, but 24 hours later Golden Cygnet's condition began to deteriorate rapidly. When O'Grady arrived home from Kilbeggan races on Monday evening, his phone rang. It was the university again. He was hoping to receive the all-clear for the horse to travel home. Instead, he was told that Golden Cygnet had suffered a brain hemorrhage as a result of an injured vertebrae and had been humanely destroyed. O'Grady said, "It was devastating, absolutely devastating. Rather like a friend or part of the family not only dying unexpectedly but in a different country. That was the hardest part." Timeform stated in their annual publication:

"Tragically, a bad fall at the last flight in the Scottish Champion Hurdle in April left him fatally injured and robbed hurdling of its most exciting recruit for years. Without doubt Golden Cygnet was a tremendous prospect and, with another year on him, there was no telling how good he might have proved himself to be. By the time of his death, he had achieved much more in his first season as a hurdler than either of the most recent winners of the Champion Hurdle, Monksfield and Night Nurse, at the same stage of their careers.......There was no doubt that he was still improving when we last saw him and it is as certain as anything can be in racing that he would have had a very bright future in the top class had he survived."

Golden Cygnet remained the highest-rated novice hurdler for over 40 years. Timeform rated him 176 at the end of that season. Sea Pigeon would later attain a rating of 175 after winning 2 Champion Hurdles. Their highest rated hurdler ever, Night Nurse, was given a mark of 182 at his best in 1976-77 but given the normal improvement one could have reasonably expected from a novice of Golden Cygnet's potential, there is every chance that he would have exceeded that figure in the future but for his fatal fall.

Golden Cygnet's full race record over hurdles is listed below:

Date	Racecourse	Distance	Race	Jockey	Weight	Going	Odds	Field	Result	Margin
08 Dec 77	Clonmel	2 miles	Maiden Hurdle	Mr N Madden	12–0	Heavy	11/10f	17	1st	3 lengths
26 Dec 77	Leopardstown	2 miles	Sean Graham Roundwood Hurdle	Mr N Madden	11–11	Yielding	6/4f	12	1st	20 lengths
07 Jan 78	Naas	2 miles	Slaney Hurdle	Mr N Madden	11–6	Yielding	4/6f	12	1st	2 lengths
25 Feb 78	Punchestown	2 miles	Fournoughts Hurdle	Mr N Madden	11–9	Soft	4/7f	7	1st	4 lengths
15 Mar 78	Cheltenham	2 miles 1f	Supreme Novices' Hurdle	Mr N Madden	11–11	Good	4/5f	18	1st	15 lengths
28 Mar 78	Fairyhouse	2 miles	Fingal Hurdle	Mr N Madden	12–0	Heavy	2/7f	9	1st	10 lengths
15 Apr 78	Ayr	2 miles	Scottish Champion Hurdle (Handicap)	Mr N Madden	11–13	Good	7/4jf	7	Fell	

== Legacy ==
Niall Madden described Golden Cygnet as "a freak." "I knew then that no matter how long I'd be in the game I'd never ride another like him." "He was different alright," said O'Grady. "The further most horses go in a race the more they come off the bridle. When he jumped off at the back of the field, he wouldn't pull. But the further he moved through the field, the more he started to pull. Exactly the opposite to a normal horse. He was certainly the best I ever had and I would like to think that he was the best I saw over hurdles." O'Grady also considered that he was not so distraught at the time as he might have been later, "Being so young, I fully expected that another every bit as good would come along and I simply didn't realize that a horse of his ability would prove to be quite so rare."

Golden Cygnet has a race named in his honour, the Golden Cygnet Novice Hurdle, which takes place annually at Leopardstown in early February.

In the aftermath of his death, one Irish newspaper described him as "the greatest loss to National Hunt racing since Arkle" whilst another quoted a leading trainer as saying "They say that there is always another one around the corner but somehow I think it is going to be a very long corner before we see another Golden Cygnet." He remained Timeform's highest-rated novice hurdler until they gave Constitution Hill a rating of 177 after the 2022 Supreme Novices' Hurdle.
