= Castleshane (horse) =

Irish-bred Thoroughbred racehorse

- Sire: Kris
- Grandsire: Sharpen Up
- Dam: Ahbab
- Damsire: Ajdal
- Sex: Gelding
- Foaled: 1997
- Country: Ireland
- Colour: Bay
- Breeder: Shadwell Estate Company Limited
- Owner: Mrs D Dukes
- Trainer: Steve Gollings
- Record: 92: 10-9-14
- Earnings: £124,121

Major wins
- Welsh Hurdle, Tetley Smooth Handicap

Castleshane is a racehorse who has been trained in Lincolnshire by Steve Gollings since moving to Britain from Ireland in 2000. In total the horse has won 8 flat races and 2 jumps races and has been placed 23 times. He is primarily a hurdler, only having several runs over fences.

== See also ==
- List of racehorses
