= Al Ferof =

French-bred Thoroughbred racehorse

- Sire: Dom Alco
- Grandsire: Dom Pasquini
- Dam: Maralta
- Damsire: Altayan
- Sex: Gelding
- Foaled: 30 March 2005
- Country: France
- Colour: Grey
- Breeder: J. Rauch and G. Chenu
- Owner: John Hales
- Trainer: Dan Skelton
- Record: 28: 11-4-7
- Earnings: £510,857

Major wins
- Winter Bumper (2010); Supreme Novices' Hurdle (2011); November Novices' Chase (2011); Henry VIII Novices' Chase (2011); Paddy Power Gold Cup (2012); Amlin 1965 Chase (2013, 2014); Peterborough Chase (2015)

Al Ferof (30 March 2005) is a retired French-bred British-based National Hunt horse owned by John Hales. He was initially trained by Barry Murphy in wexford for Martin Timothy Murphy. He was then trained by Paul Nicholls and won the 2011 Supreme Novices’ Hurdle at the Cheltenham Festival before progressing to chasing the following season, where he won several top races including the Paddy Power Gold Cup. He moved to the stable of Dan Skelton in 2015 and won the Peterborough Chase for his new trainer. Al Ferof was retired from racing in October 2016.

== Background ==
Al Ferof is a grey gelding and was bred by J. Rauch and G. Chenu in France. His sire Dom Alco is a hugely successful sire of National Hunt horses, with 2012 Grand National winner Neptune Collonges and 2012 Betfair Chase winner Silviniaco Conti among his progeny. Al Ferof was initially owned by Martin Timothy Murph an engineer from Cork in Ireland before being sold to John Hales.

== Racing career ==
=== 2008/2009 season: Point to Point ===
Al Ferof began his career on the amateur Point-to-point circuit. He made his racing debut at Summerhill in 2009, where he fell behind Jetnova. He then won a three-mile race at Athlacca, beating future Tolworth Hurdle winner Minella Class.

=== 2009/2010 season: National Hunt Flat races ===
Al Ferof finished third to Summit Meeting in a National Hunt Flat race at Punchestown, before winning a similar event at Fairyhouse.

Al Ferof made his debut for Champion Trainer Paul Nicholls in a Grade 2 Bumper race at Newbury, which he won by five lengths under Ruby Walsh. He then finished an eight length second to Cue Card in the Champion Bumper at the Cheltenham Festival.

=== 2010/11 National Hunt season: novice hurdling ===
Al Ferof's first start over hurdles ended in a fall when leading at Cheltenham in December. He immediately stepped up in class and trip to contest the Grade 1 Challow Hurdle at Newbury, finishing nine lengths back in third behind Backspin. Al Ferof finally got off the mark over hurdles in a two-mile three furlong race at Taunton, which he won easily by twenty lengths as the 1/7 favourite.

==== Newbury incident ====
Al Ferof was then involved in a tragic incident at Newbury, where live cables under the parade ring electrocuted two horses before a novice hurdle race. Al Ferof avoided a shock, and won the race by fifteen lengths before the rest of the meeting was abandoned due to safety concerns.

Al Ferof's next race came in the Supreme Novices' Hurdle at Cheltenham, where he was considered a 10/1 shot behind the favourite Cue Card. In an unusually strong field, Al Ferof became outpaced two flights out, but stayed on resolutely up the hill to beat Spirit Son by two lengths. The subsequent performances of the beaten horses marked this out as a quality renewal of the race: Spirit Son went on to romp in the Grade 2 Mersey Novices' Hurdle at Aintree, third placed Sprinter Sacre developed into a top class two mile chaser and won the Arkle Challenge Trophy and Cue Card also became a top class chaser and winner of the Ascot Chase.

=== 2011/12 National Hunt season: novice chasing ===
Al Ferof switched to fences the following season and made his chasing debut in the Grade 2 November Novices' Chase at Cheltenham, which he won easily by seven lengths from Astracad. He then stepped up in class for the Grade 1 Henry VIII Novices' Chase at Sandown in December. Sent off the 4/11 favourite, Al Ferof was forced to work unexpectedly hard to repel future Scilly Isles Novices' Chase winner For Non Stop by a neck.

Paul Nicholls next pitted Al Ferof against seasoned chasers in the Grade 1 Victor Chandler Chase at Ascot in January. Kept wide by Ruby Walsh, Al Ferof jumped well but was outpaced by Somersby and subsequent Queen Mother Champion Chase winner Finian's Rainbow. Afterwards, Walsh suggested that the King George VI Chase over three miles at Kempton would suit the horse, who appeared more of a stayer.

Despite the reverse, Al Ferof stayed at two miles for a rematch with Sprinter Sacre, who was unbeaten in two starts over fences, in the Grade 1 Arkle Challenge Trophy at the Cheltenham Festival. Sent off at 3/1, Al Ferof attempted to pressurise Sprinter Sacre on the far side of the course, but made a bad mistake four out and dropped away to finish a distant fourth behind Sprinter Sacre, Cue Card and 2010 Supreme Novices’ Hurdle winner Menorah.

Al Ferof completed his first season chasing in the Grade 1 Manifesto Novices’ Chase over two and a half miles at Aintree. Although the favourite, Al Ferof ran a rather lifeless race to finish third to Menorah and stablemate Cristal Bonus.

=== 2012/13 National Hunt season ===
Al Ferof made his seasonal debut in the Paddy Power Gold Cup at Cheltenham, a race his trainer Paul Nicholls had never won. He was given the weight of top weight of 11 st 8 lbs and, in very soft conditions, stayed on stoutly to defeat Walkon by three lengths. Trainer Paul Nicholls called it "a stunning performance". After the race, the King George on Boxing Day was announced as his target, and he was cut to around 5/1 second favourite behind Long Run for the race.

On 17 December 2012, Paul Nicholls announced that Al Ferof had "a small nick in a tendon", and would miss the King George and the rest of the season. In a strange coincidence, his illustrious stablemate Big Buck's, four-time winner of the World Hurdle, suffered a similar injury at the same time. Owner John Hales announced that Al Ferof would probably need around twelve months off, but would hopefully be fit to race the following season.

=== 2013/14 National Hunt season ===
After more than a year off the track Al Ferof returned in a two-runner affair, considered by Racing Post a public schooling session, in the Ascot 1965 Chase on which he made all to win by 8 lengths. His next start was in the King George VI Chase where after staying in touch with the leader who set a good gallop he could only manage third spot behind his stablemate Silviniaco Conti. In February 2014 he started 5/4 short favourite in the Denman Chase but facing a heavy going and a three miles trip he failed to get home and finished in second spot, 25 lengths behind the winner, trainer Paul Nicholls reporting: "Daryl (Jacob) said he travelled really well into the straight but then just ran out of stamina". At the 2014 Cheltenham Festival Al Ferof was dropped down in trip, going instead for the 2m5f(4.22 km) Ryanair Chase and while the good ground was in his favour he still failed to make an impression, only staying on for the 5th place with the Vet reporting after the race that he had got struck into on his off fore.

=== 2014/15 National Hunt season ===
Al Ferof returned for his first run of the 2014/15 campaign in the same race that he won at the start of last season, the Ascot 1965 Chase, in which he met six opponents, two of them higher rated on the official handicapper scale than himself at that time. He tracked the leader throughout the race but by the last fence he took the lead and drew away clear of his opponents to win by 7 lengths. The Grade 1 King George VI Chase was targeted a month later but like in the previous year his stablemate Silviniaco Conti proved better than Al Ferof, who stayed on well in the final stage of the race to take the third place. In February 2015 Al Ferof was entered in the Ascot Chase but Paul Nicholls ruled him out with couple of days prior to the race and also took him out of the upcoming Cheltenham Festival, explaining that "He has a partially entrapped epiglottis which requires minor corrective surgery", and only returned for the Aintree and Sandown festivals at the end of National Hunt season. In the Grade 1 Melling Chase at Aintree Al Ferof wasn't able to prove competitive and only finished in fifth place while two weeks later at Sandown he was dropped in class for the listed event Oaksey Chase where he found an opponent too good finishing only a length and a quarter in second spot at the line.

=== 2015/16 National Hunt season ===
In the next season Al Ferof was transferred to a new stable and was sent in training with Dan Skelton, the former assistant of Paul Nicholls. He reported at the start of the campaign that "Al Ferof is absolutely fine and we are just ticking away quietly with him". In early December on his first seasonal appearance he bolted up in the Grade 2 Peterborough Chase after travelling the best of his rivals. At the last fence Al Ferof was three lengths in front of his main adversary Ptit Zig, who made a mistake and went down, leaving Al Ferof to finish 40 lengths clear of the nearest pursuer.

Al Ferof next start was his third successive attempt in the King George VI Chase over three miles trip with Skelton declaring that "Al Ferof is in the best shape possible". He travelled in the rear for the first circuit and was only asked to make progress in the last mile. He responded well to his jockey Harry Skelton and was about to make a move in the home straight when the lack of stamina, just like in his previous attempts in this race, prevented him of getting in contention with the three leaders. At the second last fence the favourite of the race Don Cossack fell and left Al Ferof to run on for the same third spot in which he completed for the last two renewals, with the Hennessy winner Smad Place a further three lengths in behind.

Al Ferof was expected to compete in steeplechases again in the 2016–17 season but sustained a minor leg injury. The injury was not serious but given the horse's age, it was decided to retire him from racing. He won 11 of his 28 races and over £500,000 in prize money.
