= Donohoe Marquees Novice Hurdle =

Hurdle horse race in Ireland

Dunboyne Castle Novice Hurdle
2026
Koktail Brut	Ebony King	Murat

Previous years
2025
Irancy	Karniquet	Belloccio
2024
Mirazur West	Kilbarry Saint	Western Diego
2023
Hercule Du Seuil	Hunters Yarn	Amir Kabir
2022
Flame Bearer	Ha D'Or	The Tide Turns
2021
Echoes In Rain	M C Muldoon	Colonel Mustard

2020-2011
2019
Mister Blue Sky	Cash Back	Valdieu
2018
Getabird	Draconien	Hardline
2017
Bleu Berry	Outspoken	Montalbano
2016
Sutton Place	Royal Caviar	Moon Over Germany
2015
Sempre Medici	Identity Thief	Rich Coast
2014
Valseur Lido	Real Steel	Double Irish
2013
Pique Sous	Cops And Robbers	Sizing Rio
2012
Alderwood	Allure Of Illusion	Jacksonslady
2011
Prima Vista	Rathlin	Dare To Doubt

2010-2001
2010
Luska Lad	Blackstairmountain	Mr Cracker
2009
Kempes	Dundrum	Alice Bradys Call
2008
Jered	Made In Taipan	Narquois
2007
De Valira	Cuan Na Grai	Glencove Marina
2006
Glenfinn Captain	O'Muircheartaigh	Jazz Messenger
2005
Justified	The Railway Man	Blazing Liss
2004
Royal Alphabet	Snapper Creek	Power Elite
2003
Glenhaven Nugget	Mutakarrim	Carlesimo
2002
Hyderabad	Turtleback	Cashel Bay
2001
Ned Kelly	Kilcash Castle	Grinkov

2000-1991
2000
Ross Moff	Minella Hotel	Hot Stuff
1999
Cardinal Hill	Native Upmanship	Dance So Suite
1998
Unarmed	Amberleigh House	Taklif
1997
Gazalani	Humbel	Grey Guy
1996
Castlekellyleader	Rifawan	Kaldan Khan
1995
Hotel Minella	The Carrig Rua	Ventana Canyon
1994
Klairon Davis	Sound Man	Idiots Venture
1993
Princess Casilia	Winds Of War	Muir Station
1992
Fortune And Fame	Buckboard Bounce	I'Ve Topped It
1991
Minorettes Girl	Kalanski	Wide Support

1990-1989
1990
Little Bighorn	North To Alaska	My View
1989
Toureen Prince	Silent Jet	Naevog

The Donohoe Marquees Novice Hurdle is a Grade 2 National Hunt novice hurdle race in Ireland. It is run at Fairyhouse, over a distance of 2 miles (3,218 metres) and it is scheduled to take place each year in March or April at the course's Easter Festival. The 2017 running was moved to a fixture in early April to avoid clashing with similar races at the Punchestown Festival. It is currently sponsored by Donohoe Marquees. During the 1990s it was known as the Jameson Gold Cup (Novice) Hurdle and during the 1970s & 1980s was known as the Fingal Hurdle.

== Records ==
Leading jockey since 1989 (5 wins):

- Paul Carberry – Cardinal Hill (1999), Ross Moff (2000), Scottish Memories (2002), Jered (2008), Prima Vista (2011)

Leading trainer since 1989 (13 wins):

- Willie Mullins - Princess Casilia (1993), Royal Alphabet (2004), Kempes (2009), Pique Sous (2013), Valseur Lido (2014), Sempre Medici (2015), Bleu Berry (2017), Getabird (2018), Mister Blue Sky (2019), Echoes in Rain (2021), Hercule Du Seuil (2023), Mirazur West (2024), Irancy (2025)

== Winners ==
Year	Winner	Age	Jockey	Trainer
1989	Toureen Prince	6	Tony Mullins	Paddy Mullins
1990	Little Bighorn	5	Tommy Carmody	Noel Meade
1991	Minorettes Girl	6	Tony Mullins	Paddy Mullins
1992	Fortune And Fame	5	Brendan Sheridan	Dermot Weld
1993	Princess Casilia	8	Willie Mullins (Note: amateur jockey)	Willie Mullins
1994	Klairon Davis	5	T Horgan	Arthur Moore
1995	Hotel Minella	8	Jamie Osborne	Aidan O'Brien
1996	Castlekellyleader	7	Tommy Treacy	Paddy Mullins
1997	Gazalani	5	Tommy Treacy	Patrick O Brady
1998	Unarmed	5	Tommy Treacy	Paddy Mullins
1999	Cardinal Hill	5	Paul Carberry	Noel Meade
2000	Ross Moff	7	Paul Carberry	Tony Martin
2001	Ned Kelly	5	Norman Williamson	Edward O'Grady
2002	Scottish Memories	6	Paul Carberry	Noel Meade
2003	Glenhaven Nugget	7	Norman Williamson	Edward O'Grady
2004	Royal Alphabet	6	David Casey	Willie Mullins
2005	Justified	6	Shay Barry	Dusty Sheehy
2006	Glenfinn Captain	7	Tony McCoy	Tom Taaffe
2007	De Valira	5	Andrew Lynch	Michael O'Brien
2008	Jered	6	Paul Carberry	Noel Meade
2009	Kempes	6	Ruby Walsh	Willie Mullins
2010	Luska Lad	6	Davy Russell	John Joseph Hanlon
2011	Prima Vista	6	Paul Carberry	Noel Meade
2012	Alderwood	8	Tony McCoy	Thomas Mullins
2013	Pique Sous	6	Paul Townend	Willie Mullins
2014	Valseur Lido	5	Davy Russell	Willie Mullins
2015	Sempre Medici	5	Ruby Walsh	Willie Mullins
2016	Sutton Place	5	Barry Geraghty	Gordon Elliott
2017	Bleu Berry	6	Ruby Walsh	Willie Mullins
2018	Getabird	6	Paul Townend	Willie Mullins
2019	Mister Blue Sky	5	Ruby Walsh	Willie Mullins
	no race 2020 (Note: The 2020 running was cancelled because of the COVID-19 pandemic in the Republic of Ireland)
2021	Echoes In Rain	5	Paul Townend	Willie Mullins
2022	Flame Bearer	7	Jack Doyle	Pat Doyle
2023	Hercule Du Seuil	6	Mark Walsh	Willie Mullins
2024	Mirazur West	6	Mark Walsh	Willie Mullins
2025	Irancy	7	Mark Walsh	Willie Mullins
2026	Koktail Brut	6	Jack Kennedy	Gordon Elliott

== See also ==
- Horse racing in Ireland
- List of Irish National Hunt races
