= Kennel Gate Novices' Hurdle =

Hurdle horse race in Britain

Kennel Gate Novices' Hurdle (Sky Bet Supreme Trial Novices' Hurdle)
- Class: Grade 2
- Location: Ascot Racecourse; Ascot, England
- Race type: Hurdle race
- Sponsor: Sky Bet
- Website: Ascot

Race information
- Distance: 1m 7f 152y (3,156 metres)
- Surface: Turf
- Track: Right-handed
- Qualification: Four-years-old and up
- Weight: 11 st 0 lb Allowances; 7 lb for fillies and mares Penalties; 5 lb for winners of Class 1 wfa hurdles 3 lb for winners of Class 2 wfa hurdle or Class 1 handicap hurdle
- Purse: £25,000 (2020); 1st: £14,238

Kennel Gate Novices' Hurdle
2021
Jonbon	Colonel Mustard	Knappers Hill

Previous years
2020
My Drogo	Llandinabo Lad	Soaring Glory
2019
Master Debonair	Ribble Valley	Time Flies By
2018
Angels Breath	Danny Kirwan	Seddon
2017
Claimantakinforgan	Dr Des	Theclockisticking
2016
Capitaine	Captain Forez	Keep In Line
2015
Yanworth	Charbel	Aqua Dude
2014
L'ami Serge	Killultagh Vic	Only two finished
2013
Irving	Volnay De Thaix	Splash of Ginge
2012
Puffin Billy	Up To Something	Bathcounty
2011
Molotof	Peckhamecho	Hazy Tom

2010–2001
2008
Medermit	Dee Ee Williams	Wendel
2007
Deep Purple	Willie Pep	Golden Alchemist
2006
Tagula Blue	Moon Over Miami	Carlitos
2003
Perle De Puce	Lingo	Eric's Charm
2002
Kopeck	Puntal	Foreman
2001
Never	Image De Marque II	Jaboune

2000–1994
2000
Ben Ewar	Jaseur	Reiziger
1999
Monsignor	Dusk Duel	Val De Fleurie
1998
Hidebound	Renzo	Salamah
1997
Wahiba Sands	Soloman	Polydamas
1996
Make A Stand	Eagles Rest I	Bowcliffe Court
1995
Call Equiname	Speedwell Prince	Strong Promise
1994
Berude Not To	Chief's Song	Court Master

The Kennel Gate Novices Hurdle was a Grade 2 National Hunt hurdle race in Britain. It was run at Ascot a distance of about 2 miles (1 mile 7 furlongs and 152 yards, or 3,156 metres), and during its running there were eight hurdles to be jumped. The race took place each year in early December. It was most recently sponsored by Sky Bet and run as the Sky Bet Supreme Trial Novices' Hurdle.

In April 2023 the British Horseracing Authority announced the removal of the Kennel Gate from the 2023/24 programme.

== Winners ==
Year	Winner	Age	Jockey	Trainer
1994	Berude Not To	5	Jamie Osborne	Oliver Sherwood
1995	Call Equiname	5	Tony McCoy	Paul Nicholls
1996	Make A Stand	5	Tony McCoy	Martin Pipe
1997	Wahiba Sands	4	Tony McCoy	John Dunlop
1998	Hidebound	6	Mick Fitzgerald	Nicky Henderson
1999	Monsignor	5	Norman Williamson	Mark Pitman
2000	Ben Ewar	6	Thierry Doumen	François Doumen
2001	Never	4	Thierry Doumen	François Doumen
2002	Kopeck	4	Leighton Aspell	Josh Gifford
2003	Perle De Puce	4	Mick Fitzgerald	Nicky Henderson
2004	Marcel (Note: The 2004 race was run at Windsor while Ascot was closed for redevelopment)	4	Timmy Murphy	Martin Pipe
2005	Abandoned due to frost
2006	Tagula Blue	6	Wayne Hutchinson	Ian Williams
2007	Deep Purple	6	Paul Moloney	Evan Williams
2008	Medermit	4	Robert Thornton	Alan King
	no race 2009 (Note: The 2009 race was abandoned because of snow)
	no race 2010 (Note: The 2010 race was abandoned because of frost)
2011	Molotof	4	Barry Geraghty	Nicky Henderson
2012	Puffin Billy	4	Barry Geraghty	Oliver Sherwood
2013	Irving	5	Nick Scholfield	Paul Nicholls
2014	L'ami Serge	4	Barry Geraghty	Nicky Henderson
2015	Yanworth	5	Barry Geraghty	Alan King
2016	Capitaine	4	Sam Twiston-Davies	Paul Nicholls
2017	Claimantakinforgan	5	Nico de Boinville	Nicky Henderson
2018	Angels Breath	4	Nico de Boinville	Nicky Henderson
2019	Master Debonair	5	Robbie Power	Colin Tizzard
2020	My Drogo	5	Harry Skelton	Dan Skelton
2021	Jonbon	5	Aidan Coleman	Nicky Henderson
	no race 2022 (Note: The 2022 race was abandoned because of a frozen track)

== See also ==
- Horse racing in Great Britain
- List of British National Hunt races

== Sources ==
- Racing Post:
  - 1994, 1995, 1996, 1997, 1998, 1999, 2000, 2001, 2002, 2003
  - 2004, 2006, 2007, 2008, 2011, 2012, 2013, 2014, 2015, 2016
  - 2017, 2018, 2019, 2020
