= Pin firing =

Obsolete treatment of horse injury

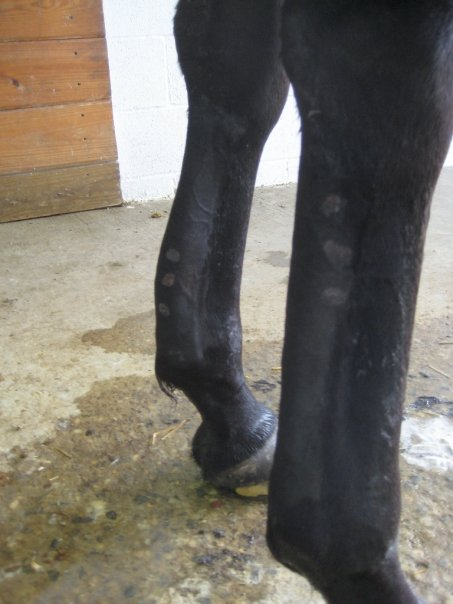
A horse with bowed tendons showing marks from recent pin firing treatment

Pin firing, also known as thermocautery, is the treatment of an injury to a horse's leg, by burning or freezing. This is supposed to induce a counter-irritation and speed and/or improve healing. This treatment is used more often on racehorses than on other performance horses. It is sometimes used in the treatment of bucked shins or splint, curb, or chronic bowed tendons. There was also the theory that it would "toughen" the leg of the horse. This treatment is prevalent in equine veterinary books published in the early 20th century; however, many present-day veterinarians and horse owners consider it barbaric and a cruel form of treatment. It is not generally taught in veterinary schools today.

== See also ==
- Prolotherapy
