= Pudim Molotov =

Portuguese dessert

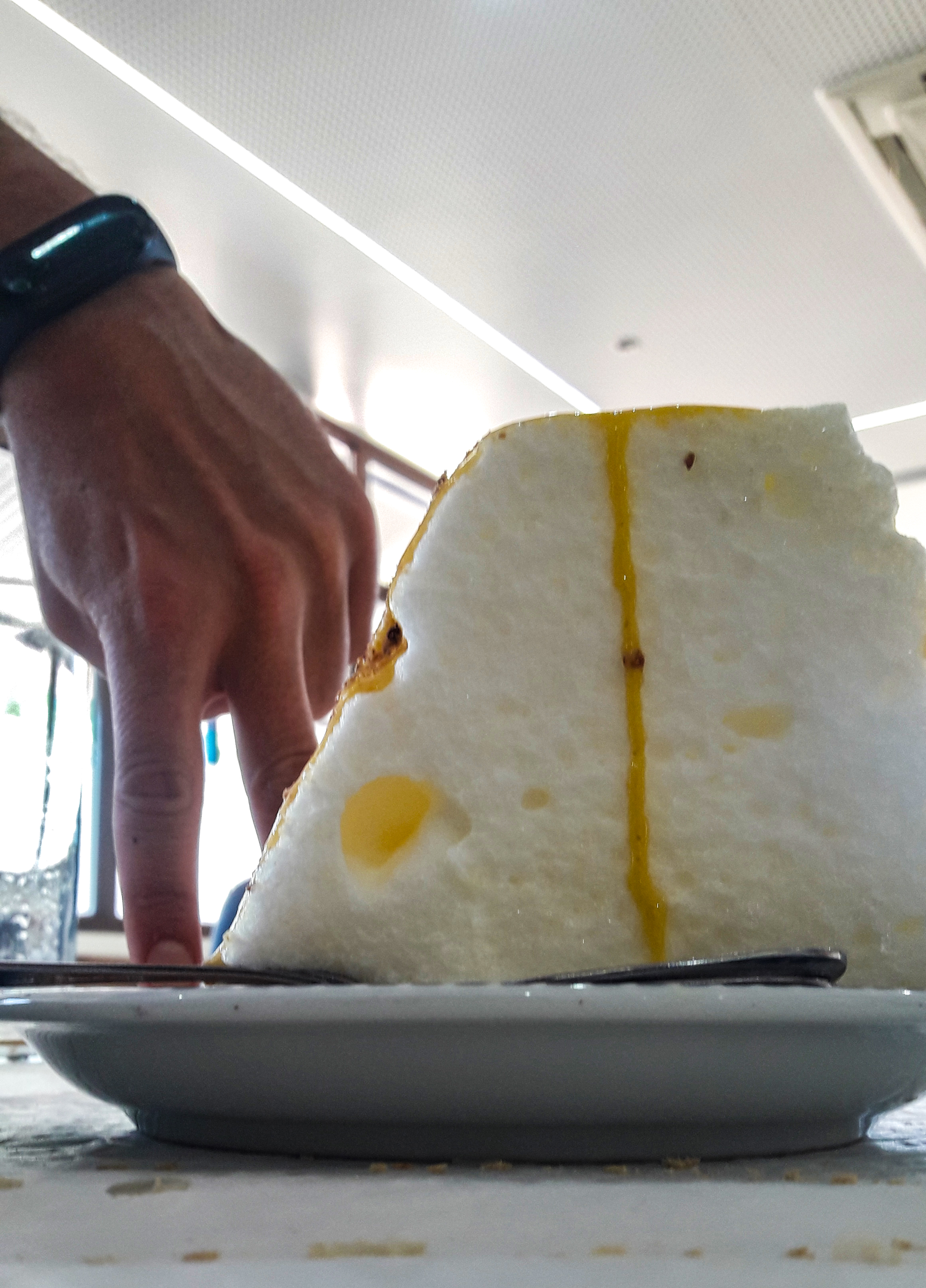
Pudim Molotov in Elvas

Pudim Molotov is a popular dessert in Portuguese cuisine. It is made with egg whites, sugar, and sometimes a touch of vanilla. The egg whites are whipped until stiff peaks form, then mixed with caramel sauce. The mixture is then baked in the oven, resulting in a light and fluffy dessert with a caramelized top.

== Origin ==
There are various theories about the origin of the dessert's name. It is believed to have been originally called malakoff pudding, named after the Malakoff Fortress in Crimea. The name Malakoff itself is thought to be derived from the Prophet Malachi.

During the Crimean War (1853-1856), the Malakhoff Fortress protected the key city of Sevastopol. After French General Aimable Pélissier captured the redoubt, he was granted the title of 1st Duke of Malakoff. His title quickly became associated with the wartime dessert made from leftover egg whites.

By World War II, Vyacheslav Skriabin was appointed as the Minister of Foreign Affairs of the USSR. Like many Soviet revolutionaries, Skriabin had adopted a pseudonym while in hiding. He chose the name Molotov, derived from the word "sledgehammer" (молот), as he believed that the name had an "industrial" and "proletarian" ring to it. As Molotov became a globally recognized figure, it is likely that confusion over the name and origin led the Portuguese to start calling the dessert pudim molotof instead of pudim malakoff.
