= T. P. Burns =

Irish jockey

Thomas Pascal "TP" Burns (14 April 1924 – 14 May 2018) was an Irish flat racing and jump jockey, who rode mainly for trainer Vincent O'Brien. In 1957, Burns won a British Classic at St Leger atop Ballymoss, a first for an Irish-bred horse. He also won six Irish Classics from 1957 to 1972.

Burns was born 14 April 1924 to Tommy "The Scotchman" Burns, a 1932 champion jockey. At age 14, TP won his first race at the 1938 Irish Derby and, again, in 1941 at the Irish Cambridgeshire.

Burns's jockey career lasted for over 50 years, with his last win being at Punchestown, on 7 July 1989.

Burns died at age 94 on 14 May 2018 in Athy.
