= Gay Future =

Irish-bred Thoroughbred racehorse

Gay Future was the racehorse at the centre of a substitution scam (also known as a ring-in) by an Irish betting syndicate in Great Britain in 1974 involving two chestnut horses. The plot's ringleaders were the millionaire Irish builder Tony Murphy, a racing enthusiast, and the Scottish trainer Antony Collins.

== Preparation ==
At his stables, Collins initially presented a poorly performing horse as if it were the real Gay Future. This lowered the expectations of reviewers, and hence raised the betting odds on offer when the horse was entered in the Ulverston Novice Hurdle at Cartmel in Cumbria to be held during the Bank holiday on 26 August 1974. The real horse was illicitly substituted, for the impostor, Arctic Chevalier, in an M6 lay-by.

== On the day ==
The attempted fraud took place on the busiest day in the racing calendar with ten events taking place, and bets being made in numerous betting shops in London in double and triple wagers, which involved Gay Future in combination bets with two additional horses trained by Collins in earlier races at other courses. On the day, these two additional horses were withdrawn shortly before the races; they were never intended to run and remained at their stables. Numerous bets would now roll over onto Gay Future, as the conspirators had planned.

Cartmel Racecourse, a small isolated venue, had only one telephone line at the time connecting it with the outside world. This was deliberately kept engaged to prevent enquiries being made by betting firms headquarters, and the on course Tote was over worked by accomplices to prevent other bets being placed on the horse, which would have lowered the odds from 10-1. Soap flakes were rubbed into the horse's legs to give the false impression that he was sweating. Gay Future won easily, by fifteen lengths, but bookmakers refused to pay out before an inquiry. In Ireland, however, they paid out. Collins's other two horses involved in the scam were discovered at this time to have remained at their stables and suspicions were further raised.

== Trial and legacy ==
Following an investigation by Scotland Yard's Serious Crimes Squad, a trial was held at Preston Crown Court in February 1976. The two leading syndicate members, Collins and Murphy, were convicted of conspiracy to defraud the bookmakers. Mr Justice Caulfield, a sympathetic judge, fined Collins £1,000 combined with a suspended prison sentence. The UK's Jockey Club "warned off" Collins and Murphy from British racecourses for ten years. The horse, Gay Future, broke his neck and died, aged six, at a racing event in Wetherby in January 1976.

The affair was dramatised in Murphy's Stroke (1980), a TV film produced by Thames Television with Pierce Brosnan and Niall Toibin in the leads. At an event commemorating the 40th anniversary in late August 2014 at the Cartmel racecourse, Collins said that he did not regret his actions.
