= Edward O'Grady =

Irish National Hunt trainer (1949–2025)

- O'Grady at his stables in 2024

Personal information
- Born: 27 September 1949
- Died: 27 July 2025 (aged 75) Dublin, Ireland
- Occupation: Trainer
- Spouses: Judy Mullins (m. 1972, divorced) Maria Anderton (m. 1999; died 2017) Kay Russell (m. 2024)
- Website: https://www.edwardogrady.com/

Horse racing career
- Sport: Horse racing

Major racing wins
- As a trainer in British National Hunt Grade Ones; Tingle Creek Chase (1995, 1996); Aintree Hurdle (2003); Victor Chandler Chase (1991).

Honours
- Leading Trainer Ireland 1979

Significant horses
- Gay Future; Golden Cygnet; Shining Flame; Hind Hope; Rugged Lucy; Hard Tarquin; Drumlargan

Edward O'Grady (27 September 1949 – 27 July 2025) was an Irish National Hunt racehorse trainer. In the 1980s and 1990s, O'Grady was the second best of the Irish trainers at Cheltenham in number of winning horses, after Vincent O'Brien. He was played by Pierce Brosnan in the 1980 film Murphy's Stroke.

== Early life ==
O'Grady was born on 27 September 1949. He attended Blackrock College and left veterinary college in Dublin to take over at Killeen Stables following his father's death on 23 January 1972. His father, Willie, was a top jump jockey and twice Irish Champion Jockey, in 1934 and 1935. The younger O'Grady trained his first winner when his first cousin Timmy Hyde rode Vibrax in a handicap hurdle at Gowran Park on 27 January 1972. Following this success a virus struck all of his 18 horses causing many owners to leave him.

== 1970s and 1980s ==
In March 1974, O'Grady's debut Cheltenham Festival winner occurred when Mr. Midland was ridden to victory by Mouse Morris. The next August, another of his horses, Gay Future, was involved in an attempted coup by an Irish betting syndicate. He was one of the four people who were arrested during the following police investigation, however, all charges laid against him were then dropped. The Irish Times wrote of it in 2020, "one of racing’s most daring scams was almost pulled off." The incident was the basis of the 1980 film Murphy's Stroke, in which Pierce Brosnan played him.

Soon, he established himself as the leading national hunt trainer in Ireland, and Golden Cygnet became the star race horse of his stable. He said the horse was the most naturally talented horse he had ever trained. The horse won the 1978 Supreme Novice Hurdle at Cheltenham. However, Golden Cygnet died after a fall in the Scottish Champion Hurdle at Ayr. Afterwards, Shining Flame, one of his horses that was owned by J.P. McManus, broke his leg at Tramore Racecourse less than two weeks after capturing the Galway Plate. In spite of this, O'Grady became Leading Trainer Ireland 1979.

After Shining Flame's 1978 victory, O'Grady's horses went on to win three Galway Plates over the span of four years, with Hind Hope and Rugged Lucy winning in 1979 and 1981 respectively. Hard Tarquin's victory in the 1979 Galway Hurdle made him the fifth trainer to win both "big races" in the same year.

One of his other horses, Drumlargan, won the 1983 Whitbread Gold Cup, which O'Grady called "the most memorable win of my career". Bit of a Skite then won that same year's Irish Grand National.

== 1990s and 2000s ==
His horse, Sound Man won two Tingle Creek Chases in a row (1995 and 1996), and Blitzkrieg won the 1991 Victor Chandler Chase. Sacundai, being ridden by Ruby Walsh, won the Martell Cognac Aintree Hurdle in 2003. That same year, Back in Front came in first place at Cheltenham's Supreme Novices' Hurdle and the Evening Herald Novice Hurdle at Punchestown. Another victory came in 2009, when Tranquil Sea, ridden by Andrew McNamara, became the second Irish-trained runner to claim victory in the Paddy Power Gold Cup at Cheltenham, only after Bright Highway in 1980.

== Personal life and death ==
O'Grady married his first wife, Judy Mullins, in January 1972, she died as Judy Sweeney in October 2009. He married his second wife, Maria Anderton, in 1999. She was killed in November 2017 after a fall during a hunting session with the Tipperary Foxhounds. He later married his third wife, Kay Russell. He had five children total, Amber, Jonathan, Lucy, Mimi, and Rosie Mae.

O'Grady died on 27 July 2025, after a short illness at the age of 75, at St. James's Hospital in Dublin. He was buried on 1 August.
