= Harry Hastings =

Scottish physician and Presbyterian missionary

- Born: c. 1894
- Died: January 20, 1951; Edinburgh, Scotland
- Other names: Henry Hastings
- Citizenship: Scottish
- Education: The University of Edinburgh (M.B., Ch.B)
- Years active: 1922/4 – 1949
- Spouse: Mrs. I. Y. Hastings
- Medical career
- Profession: Medical Missionary, Doctor, Surgeon, Christian Missionary
- Institutions: Uburu Hospital, Nigeria
- Awards: Order of the British Empire (1945)

Harry Hastings (c. 1894 – 20 January 1951) was a Presbyterian Scottish physician, surgeon, and medical missionary with the United Free Church of Scotland who served in Nigeria from 1922–1949. Hastings worked primarily at the Uburu Hospital but also in the village of Itu, both in Ogoja Province in Nigeria. Hastings was assisted by his wife, described as a "practical nurse", who accompanied him on his missions to Africa from 1922–1949 and shared responsibility with him in developing clinics to treat leprosy. He also worked with fellow physicians R.M. Macdonald of Scotland and Akanu Ibiam of Nigeria during his time in Uburu. He is known for developing Nigerian staff to run health services without additional foreign missionaries.

== Early life and education ==
Hastings was born in Scotland. After military service in Germany in World War I, he studied medicine and graduated from the University of Edinburgh with a Bachelor of Medicine and a Bachelor of Surgery in 1922.

== Career ==
=== Missionary work in Itu ===
A part of the Calabar mission, Hastings began his missionary service in Itu, Nigeria in 1922. Hastings saw over 500 patients in the first few days. However, many in Itu were more trusting of the local healers in the community, leading to a decline in their condition before being seen by Hastings. He left Itu in 1924 and was stationed at Uburu.

=== Missionary work in Uburu ===
==== Yaws ====
Hasting's reputation began to grow as a result of his treatment of yaws in Uburu in 1924. Hastings gave the novoarsenobenzyl injection (N.A.B.), the clinic in Uburu grew. After one or two shots, yaws would be cured. The number of patients in Uburu grew from 4,983 in 1924 to 60,401 in 1928. During one weekend in the nearby village of Abiriba, Hastings gave 6,000 injections of the N.A.B. shot, effective in treating yaws and syphilis.

==== Leprosy ====
Hastings began to focus on leprosy in 1928 with the establishment of a "leprosy camp" to treat the epidemic that was sweeping Nigeria in the 1920s and 1930s. He asked the council of the British Medical Journal for permission for land to create a treatment facility (at that time referred to as a "leper colony" in Uburu). Unlike other missionaries, though, he never asked the council for money or for staff. Treatment was with hydnocarpus oil, adopted from traditional practices in India and China. The facility began with seventy patients in 1928, and grew to 200 by 1933. As a result of constructing a second hospital in Osu, a nearby village, Hastings was supervising 532 patients and grew to be called the Ogoja Leprosy Scheme, later named the Southern Ogoja Leprosy Service in 1946.

Of the 532 patients, only 197 of them remained in the camp itself. Hastings did not isolate all patients with leprosy into compulsory, European style separate communities, which was considered a standard practice at the time. Hastings instead allowed patients to live in communities of their choosing arranged for by kin, thus providing therapy and being cheaper and easier to manage. The Hastings model was widely adopted in a number of different provinces in Nigeria. Hastings later built three more clinics. He thought his third clinic––in Owerri Eda, another village––would be his last, but competition from Catholic missionaries in the area starting in 1940 spurred Hastings to treat even more people. By 1943, Hastings opened the three additional clinics, and then he returned to Scotland in 1949 as a result of an illness.

== Legacy ==
Hastings was an advocate for transferring control of schools to local Nigerian teachers. By 1949, thirty-six out of fifty-four members of the Education Authority––a group overseeing local schools––were native Nigerians, not European missionaries.

Ernest Muir, in a report on anti-leprosy work in Nigeria in 1936, indicates that Hastings approach of not isolating all patients with leprosy into separate communities was utilized in nearby Nigerian areas, such as Oji River (Onitsha Province) and Uzuakoli (Owerri Province).

Besides Hasting's wife and Macdonald, every other position in the hospital or treatment facility was filled by a local trainee. A local man and physician who graduated from the University of St. Andrews, Akanu Ibiam, was tasked with training nurses. Ibiam later became a mission doctor and a president of the World Council of Churches. When Hastings and Macdonald returned to Europe, two hospitals, two leper colonies, and an able team of local staff remained in Nigeria.

After R.M. Macdonald and Hastings left Nigeria, the characteristics of a medical missionary changed. Gone were the days of the colonial period of missionary work, where there were one or two doctors in a hospital. Starting in the 1950s, those who came to African nations were groups of doctors who had just graduated from medical school and were trained in the use of newer treatments, such as antibiotics, vaccinations, and blood transfusions.

=== Awards and death ===
In 1945, Hastings was awarded the Order of the British Empire for "medical and missionary services in Nigeria." He died in 1951 after returning to Scotland for medical reasons in 1949.
