= Steve Gollings =

Steve Gollings is a racehorse trainer based in Scamblesby, near Louth, Lincolnshire Steve Gollings is a highly respected dual Flat and National Hunt Racehorse Trainer based in Scamblesby, near Louth in Lincolnshire. High-profile winners include - The high class Royal Shakespeare winner of the Martell Top Novice at Aintree also second to Brave Inca in Ireland in a Grade One novice hurdle. Winner of the Agfa UK Hurdle (Listed Race) at Sandown Park. Winner of the Elite Hurdle at Wincanton (Grade 2) In 2006 Royal Shakespeare won the prestigious "Order of Merit" In Truth winner of the Kim Muir at the Cheltenham Festival. Multiple winner Conquisto winner of the Grade 2 Old Roan Chase at Aintree. winner of The Scotty Brand Handicap Chase (Listed Race) at Ayr. Prolific winner Local Hero winner of the JCB Triumph Hurdle Trial (Grade 2) at Cheltenham. Summer Hurdle (Listed Race) at Market Rasen - also the 32RED Hurdle (Listed Race) Market Rasen. Soudain (FR) winner of the Lincolnshire National at Market Rasen and also winner of the Cambridgeshire National at Huntingdon. Rare Talent winner of the Moet & Chandon Silver Magnum A/R Derby at Epsom - Rutland Chantry winner of the Moet & Chandon Silver Magnum A/R Derby at Epsom. Kings Thought winner of The City and Suburban Handicap at Epsom. Sister Superior winner of the EBF Crandon Park Mares Final (Listed Race) at Newbury.

== Royal Shakespeare ==
Gollings' best jumps horse to date is Royal Shakespeare. The horse had a very successful Novice season which included 3 straight wins and a second to Brave Inca in a Grade 1 Novice Hurdle in Ireland, he was disappointing the following year.

In 2006 Royal Shakespeare won the Order of Merit. The year after this the horse was sent novice chasing. Gollings trained the horse, Mr Shambles (Kevin Tobin) who won at Market Rasen in 2008.
