= Newbury Racecourse =

Horse racing, conference and events venue in England

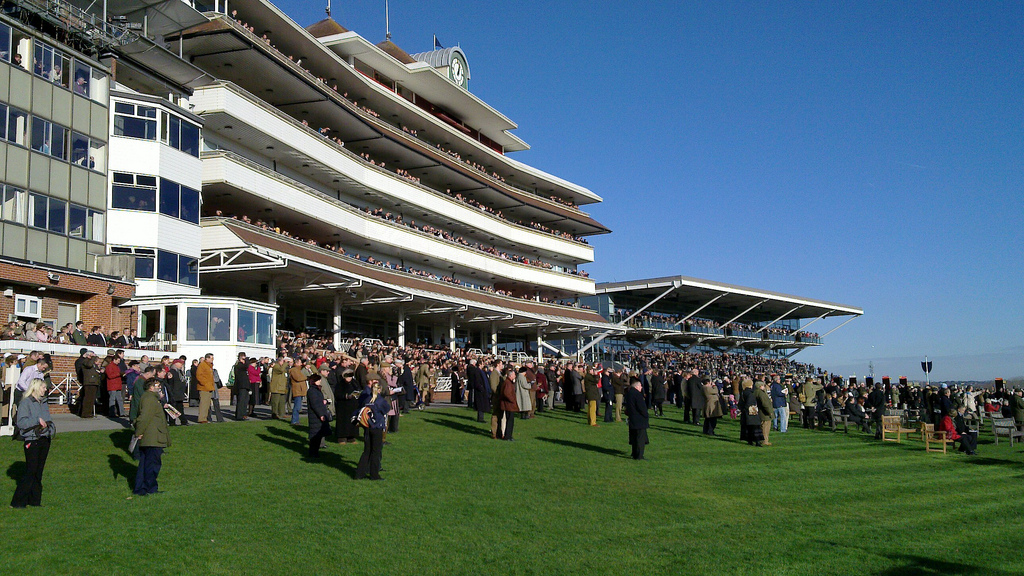
- The Berkshire Stand and The Grandstand
- Interactive map of Newbury Racecourse
- Location: Newbury, Berkshire, England
- Coordinates: 51°23′40″N 1°18′2″W
- Date opened: 26 September 1905
- Capacity: 24,000
- Screened on: Sky Sports Racing
- Course type: Flat; National Hunt
- Notable races: Lockinge Stakes, Hennessy Gold Cup, Challow Novices' Hurdle

Newbury Racecourse is a racecourse and events venue in the civil parish of Greenham, adjoining the town of Newbury in Berkshire, England. It has courses for flat races and over jumps. It hosts one of Great Britain's 36 annual Group 1 flat races, the Lockinge Stakes.

The racecourse is noted for its proximity to the Lambourn training centre, which means that the course is often home to locally-grown talent as well as attracting horses from further afield. Newbury's major races include the Lockinge Stakes and its most famous race, the Coral Gold Cup (formerly known as the Hennessy Gold Cup).

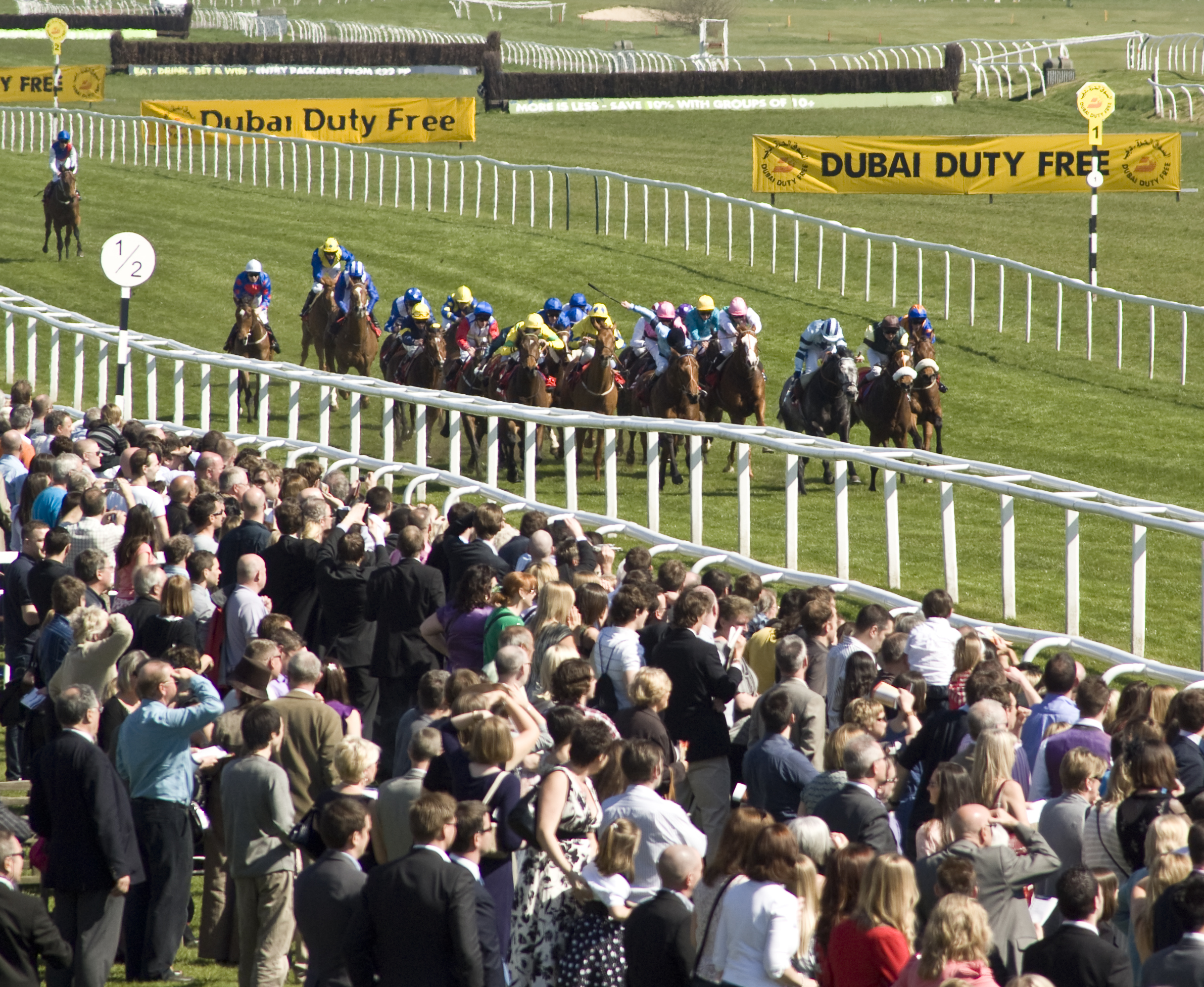
Horserace finishing at Newbury

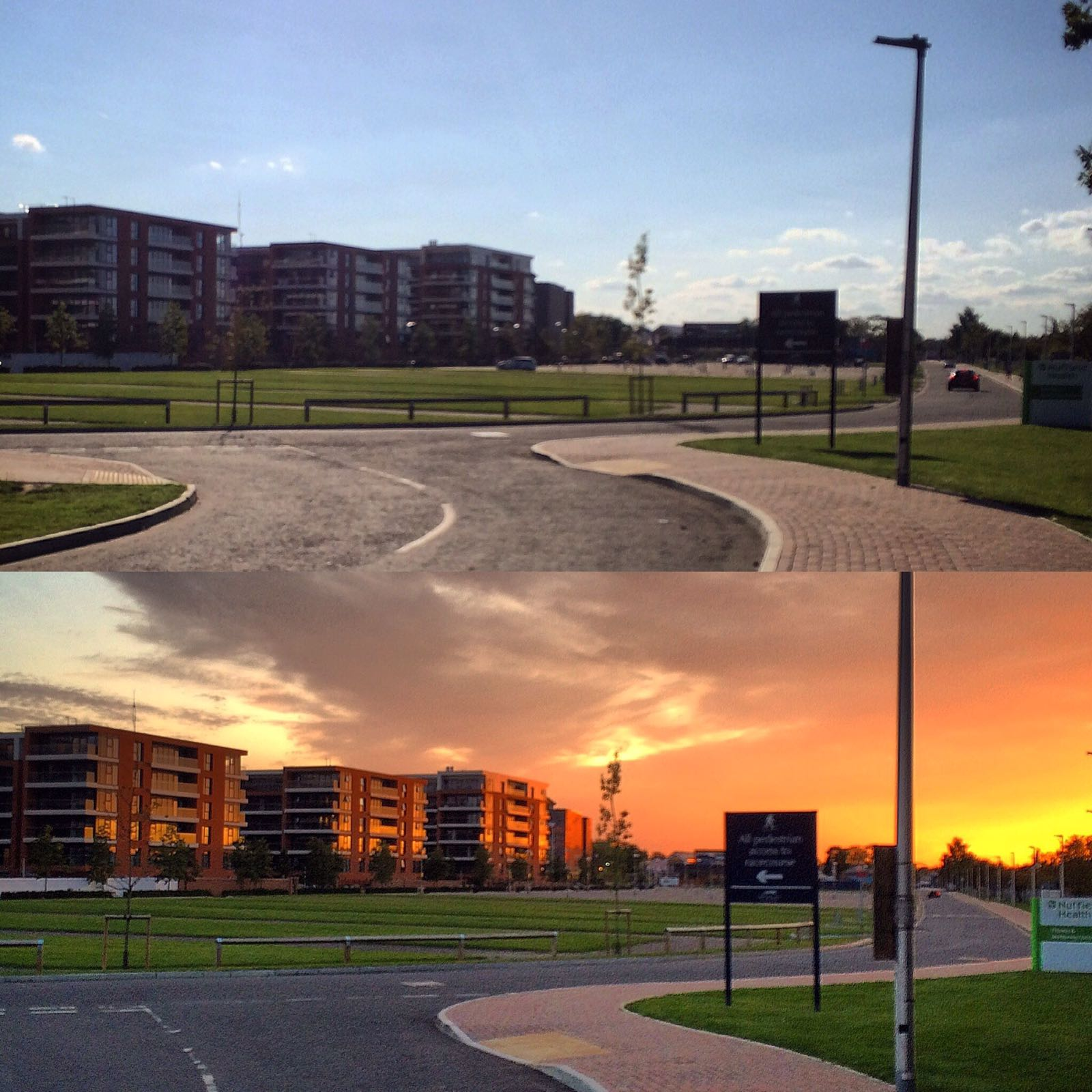
Newbury Racecourse Road, view from the Nuffield Health Gym

== History ==
Although the racecourse on its current site was not established until 1905, the first recorded horse racing in Newbury took place in 1805 with 'Newbury Races', an annual two-day race meeting at Enborne Heath. The meeting lasted until 1811 when it transferred to Woodhay Heath until 1815.

The course came into being in the early 20th century, and was the idea of a leading Kingsclere trainer, John Porter, who realised that the flat meadows beside the railway and the River Kennett at Newbury would be an ideal site for a course to serve the many training stables within a 30-mile radius of Newbury. These included Kingsclere, Weyhill, Wantage and Lambourn. The land which Porter wanted was owned by Mr. L. H. Baxendale, who lived at Greenham. Mr Baxendale liked Porter's idea and eventually became Chairman of the Newbury Racecourse Company.

In 1903 Porter took his plans to the Stewards of the Jockey Club, who turned them down because there were already enough racecourses. The story goes that a dejected John Porter left the Jockey Club and happened to bump into King Edward VII on Newmarket High Street, The king listened to Porter's story and gave his support to the proposal of a racecourse at Newbury. The Jockey Club changed its mind and granted a licence. In 1904 the Newbury Racecourse Company was founded, purchased the land and constructed the buildings and stables on the current site. The Great Western Railway Company built a station near the course. Many of the opening day's crowd of 15,000 would have travelled by train.

On Tuesday and Wednesday, 26 and 27 September 1905, the first ever race meeting took place at Newbury Racecourse. Mr. D. V. Pullinger's Copper King, at 100–7, ridden by Charlie Trigg and trained by Charles Marnes, won the opening race, the Whatcombe Handicap at 2pm, worth £160, over five furlongs. There were twenty-eight runners. The racecourse's founder, John Porter, trained Zealous to win the 1m 4f Regulation Plate, worth £100, on 27 September.

National Hunt racing followed shortly after Flat racing and in 1906, nine days racing were planned for Newbury – six on the Flat and three over Jumps. The course has been home to both Flat and Jump racing ever since, and celebrated its centenary in 2005.

During the First World War, the racecourse was used as a prisoner-of-war camp for German prisoners. Reports of unpleasant conditions at the camp - reported in German newspapers - led to its closure in early 1915.

During the Second World War, Newbury was occupied by the American Army. The turf was covered with twenty-two miles of sidings, which necessitated fresh grass being laid for the whole course. Racing resumed in April 1949, but until the early 1950s the straight course was restricted to six furlongs, rather than a mile.

Sir Peter O'Sullevan's last broadcast commentary took place in November 1997 at Newbury, on the Hennessey Gold Cup, won by Suny Bay.

In 2012, a programme of improvement to racecourse facilities was announced to be funded by developing land for housing in partnership with David Wilson Homes, a part of Barrett Developments. The first blocks of apartments at the western perimeter of the racecourse were completed in 2015.

Elizabeth II was a regular attendee of race meetings at Newbury, most notably in 2012, when she celebrated her 86th birthday there.

In September 2020 it was reported that, due to the COVID-19 pandemic, Newbury Racecourse had experienced a 68% loss of turnover for the first 6 months of 2020.

In January 2021 a COVID-19 vaccination centre was established at Newbury Racecourse.

== Course ==
James Gill wrote in 1975: "There is not a racecourse in the country more popular among both National Hunt and flat than Newbury. Riders appreciate the good ground they generally find on what is a fine, galloping track with long straights, easy left-handed bends and a racing surface of resilient, thickly-matted meadow turf. The course undulates slightly just below the seven furlong bend and inside the final furlong, and there is a gentle downhill run to the turn for home, but otherwise Newbury if pretty well flat, 80 feet wide on the round course, 90 on the straight and as fair a test of a racehorse as could be devised."

The flat course is over 1 mile 6 furlongs round, with a straight mile which joins the round course to form a home straight of 5 furlongs. Races over 7 furlongs and one mile are also run on the round course, starting on a chute.

The national hunt course is over 1 mile 5 furlongs, with eleven fences: eight plain, two open ditches and the water jump. There are four fences in the home straight, the second of which is an open ditch.

== Concerts ==
Newbury Racecourse has increasingly played host to numerous live concerts in recent years. This has predominantly been through the Party in the Paddock, in which horse racing meets during the summer are accompanied by a live concert at the end of racing.

One of the first concerts held at the racecourse was by Welsh reggae-metal band Skindred in 2006, followed by English reggae and pop band UB40 in July 2008. The latter was one of two concerts held in 2008, with Irish boyband Boyzone performing in August as part of the Ladies Day horse racing meet.

Since 2008, Newbury Racecourse has held between one and three concerts each year, mostly in support of horse racing meets. This has included three appearances by Madness, Tom Jones, Simply Red and Olly Murs.

American singer Lionel Richie was forced to cancel a performance at Newbury Racecourse in September 2012 due to illness, which would have been his first performance in the UK since 2009.

American girl group Pussycat Dolls were scheduled to perform at Newbury Racecourse as part of the Party in the Paddock on 15 August 2020, but was cancelled as a result of the COVID-19 pandemic.

However, the Party in the Paddock returned in 2021, when Olly Murs performed the first concert at Newbury Racecourse following the COVID-19 pandemic on 14 August, with an audience of 17,000. Murs had to perform with a leg brace following a serious knee injury. He returned to perform at Newbury Racecourse in August 2023, his third appearance at the venue.

Concerts held at Newbury Racecourse
Date	Performer	Tour	Notes
10 November 2006	Skindred	Babylon Tour	
11 July 2008	UB40		
16 August 2008	Boyzone	Back Again... No Matter What Tour	
30 May 2009	Madness		
15 August 2009	Simply Red	Greatest Hits Tour	
9 July 2010	Simply Red	Farewell – The Final Tour	
14 Aug 2010	Westlife	Where We Are Tour	
21 May 2011	The Wanted		
29 May 2011	Rod Stewart		
13 August 2011	Tom Jones		
18 August 2012	Jessie J		
8 June 2013	Rita Ora		Supported by Charlie Brown
17 August 2013	Meat Loaf		
19 July 2014	The Beach Boys		
18 July 2015	DJ Fresh		
19 September 2015	Madness	Grandslam Madness	
16 July 2016	Simply Red	Big Love Tour	
22 July 2017	Jess Glynne		
19 August 2017	Olly Murs	2017 UK Summer Tour	
21 July 2018	Craig David		
18 August 2018	Rudimental		
20 July 2019	Tom Jones		
17 August 2019	Madness	Madness XL	
14 August 2021	Olly Murs		
18 September 2021	Rick Astley		
16 July 2022	Craig David	Hold That Thought Tour	
22 July 2023	Tom Jones	Ages & Stages	
19 August 2023	Olly Murs	Marry Me Tour	
20 July 2024	Sigala		
17 August 2024	Dizzee Rascal		

== Facilities ==
The racecourse has a dedicated railway station, which sees heavy traffic and additional trains on race days. It also acts as a venue for conferences, meetings, weddings and Hen and Stag parties.

== 2011 incident ==
On 12 February 2011, two horses, Marching Song and Fenix Two, collapsed and died in the Paddock while parading for the first race of the day. Two others also appeared to have been affected, Kid Cassidy and The Merry Giant. The novice hurdle race went ahead, starting about 20 min late, but the rest of the day's racing was abandoned.

On 17 February, the preliminary results of the investigation into the incident were released. Professor Tim Morris, Director of Equine Science and Welfare for the British Horseracing Authority, reported that they had been informed that there had been leakage from an electrical cable running under the parade ring. Both the horses had been examined postmortem and sudden cardiac arrest, consistent with accidental electrocution, had been identified as the cause of death and no other cause of death was further investigated.

Professor Morris also stated:

I can also confirm that, contrary to speculation, no evidence of any burn marks around the mouth was found on post mortem examination, neither were such marks found by the veterinary surgeons on the horses at the start.

== Notable races ==
Month	DOW	Race Name	Type	Grade	Distance	Age/Sex
February	Saturday	Game Spirit Chase	Chase	Grade 2	2m ½f	5yo +
February	Saturday	William Hill Hurdle	Hurdle	Premier Hcap	2m ½f	4yo +
February	Saturday	Denman Chase	Chase	Grade 2	2m 7½f	5yo +
February	Saturday	Winter Bumper	N H Flat	Conditions	2m ½f	4yo-6yo
March	Saturday	Greatwood Gold Cup	Chase	Premier Hcap	2m 4f	5yo +
April	Saturday	Fred Darling Stakes	Flat	Group 3	7f	3yo only f
April	Saturday	John Porter Stakes	Flat	Group 3	1m 4f 5y	4yo +
April	Saturday	Greenham Stakes	Flat	Group 3	7f	3yo only c&g
May	Saturday	Fillies' Trial Stakes	Flat	Conditions	1m 2f	3yo only f
May	Saturday	Carnarvon Stakes	Flat	Conditions	6f	3yo only
May	Saturday	Aston Park Stakes	Flat	Conditions	1m 4f	3yo only f
May	Saturday	Lockinge Stakes	Flat	Group 1	1m	4yo +
July	Saturday	Weatherbys Super Sprint	Flat	Conditions	5f 34y	2yo only
July	Saturday	Hackwood Stakes	Flat	Group 3	6f 8y	3yo +
August	Friday	St Hugh's Stakes	Flat	Conditions	5f 34y	2yo only f
August	Saturday	Geoffrey Freer Stakes	Flat	Group 3	1m 5f 61y	3yo +
August	Saturday	Hungerford Stakes	Flat	Group 2	7f	3yo +
August	Saturday	Denford Stakes	Flat	Conditions	7f	2yo only
September	Friday	Haynes, Hanson and Clark Conditions Stakes	Flat	Novice	1m	2yo only
September	Saturday	Mill Reef Stakes	Flat	Group 2	6f 8y	2yo only
September	Saturday	World Trophy	Flat	Group 3	5f 34y	3yo +
October	Saturday	St. Simon Stakes	Flat	Group 3	1m 4f	3yo +
October	Saturday	Horris Hill Stakes	Flat	Group 3	7f	2yo only
November	Saturday	Gerry Feilden Hurdle	Hurdle	Premier Hcap	2m ½f	4yo+
November	Friday	John Francome Novices' Chase	Chase	Grade 2	2m 4f	4yo +
November	Friday	Long Distance Hurdle	Hurdle	Grade 2	3m	4yo +
November	Saturday	Coral Gold Cup	Chase	Premier Hcap	3m 2f	4yo +
December	29th	Challow Novices' Hurdle	Hurdle	Grade 1	2m 4½f	4yo +

== Image gallery ==
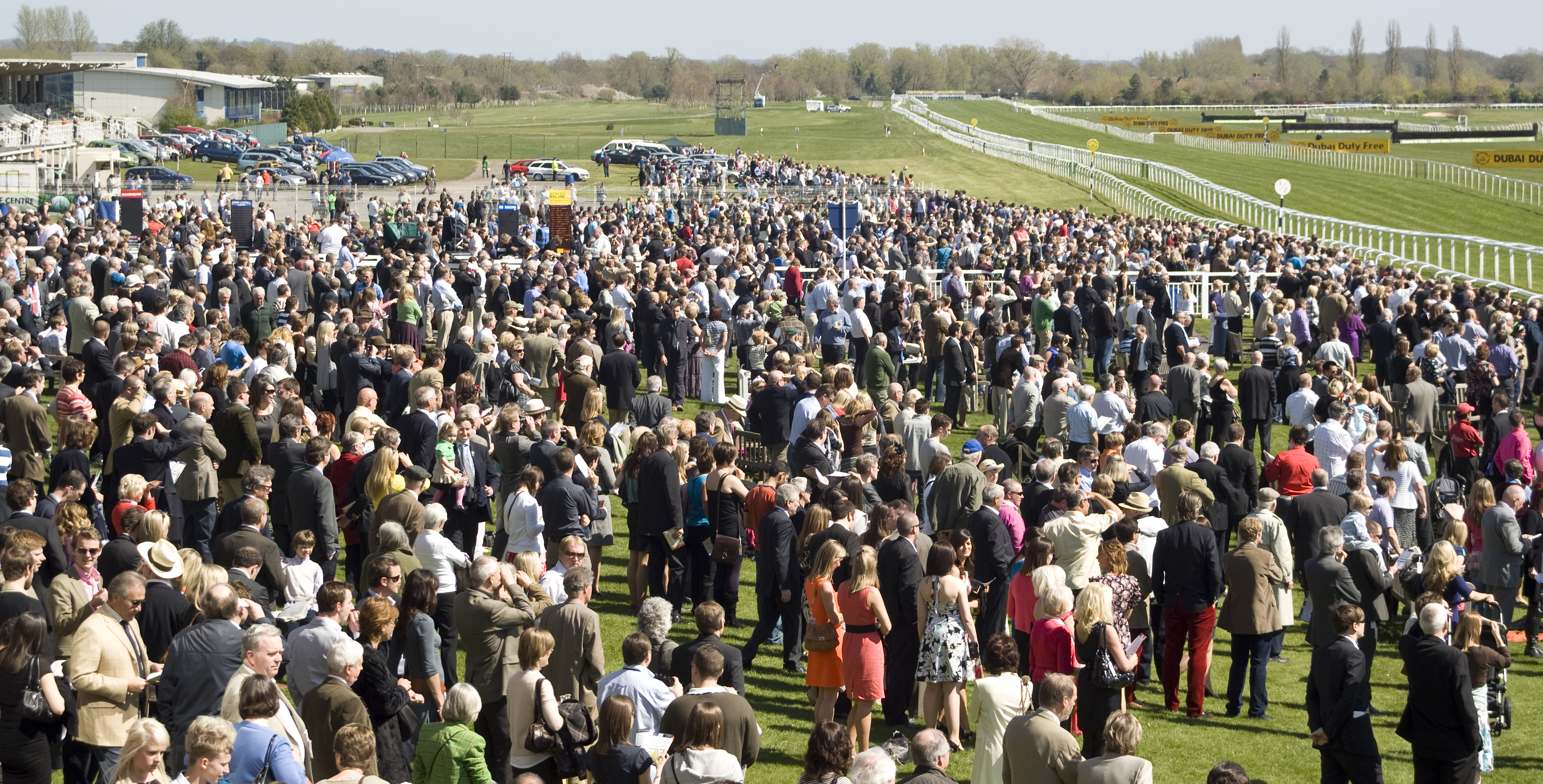
Crowds at Newbury Racecourse

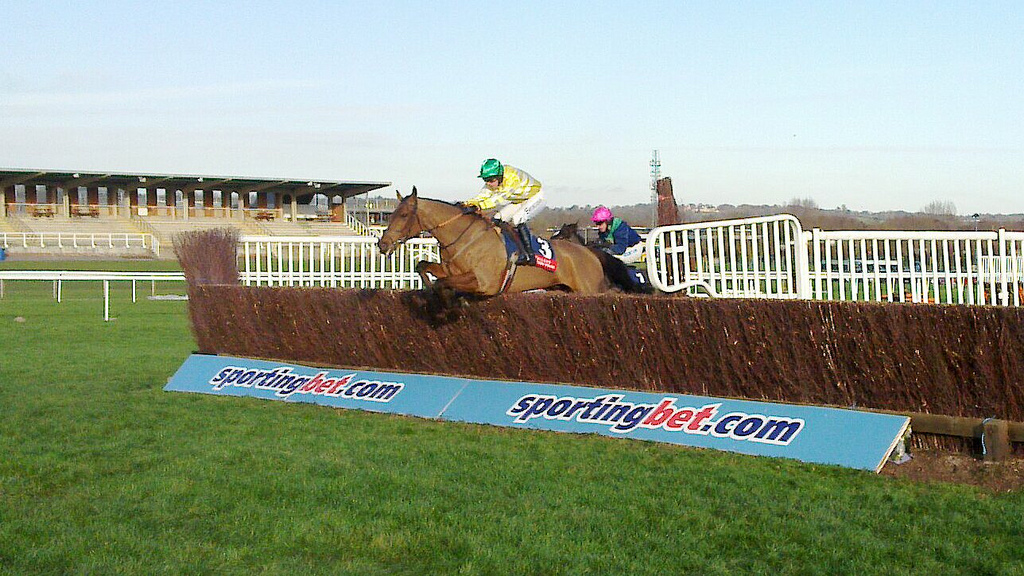
Cois Farraig jumps the last in front at Newbury

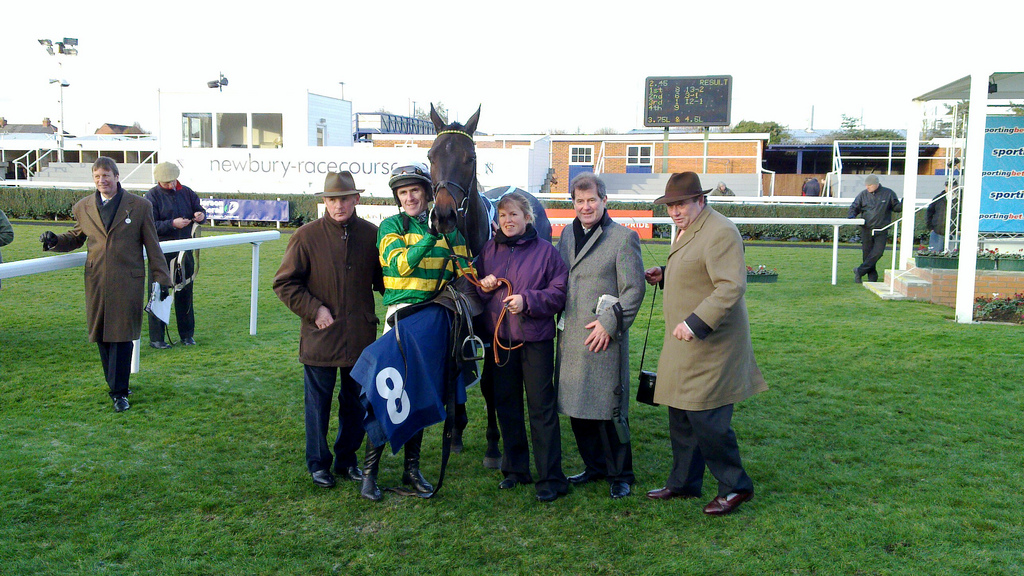
Tony McCoy, Aigle D'or, J. P. McManus & Nicky Henderson

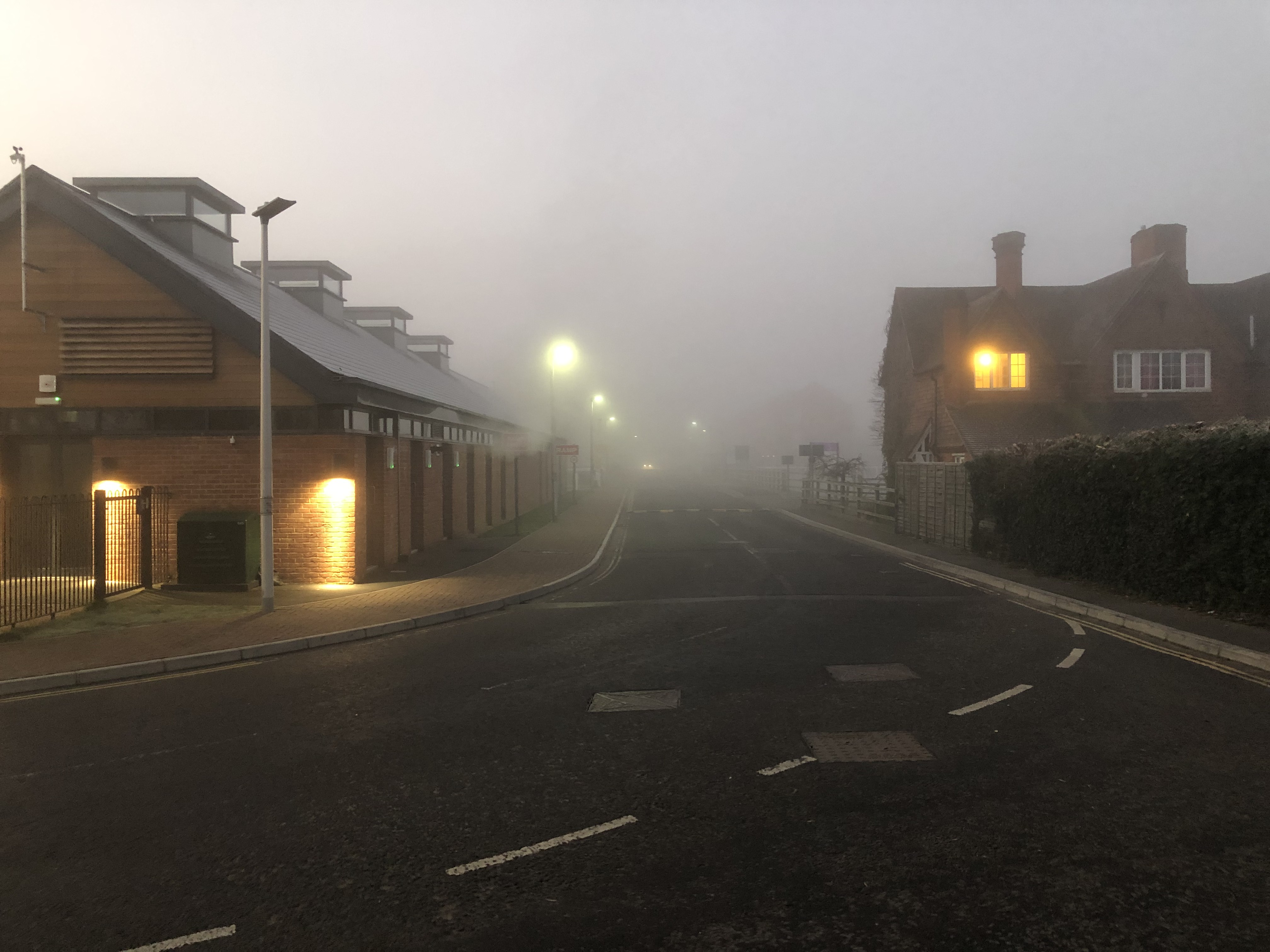
Newbury Racecourse Road, view from the main corner with the main entrance

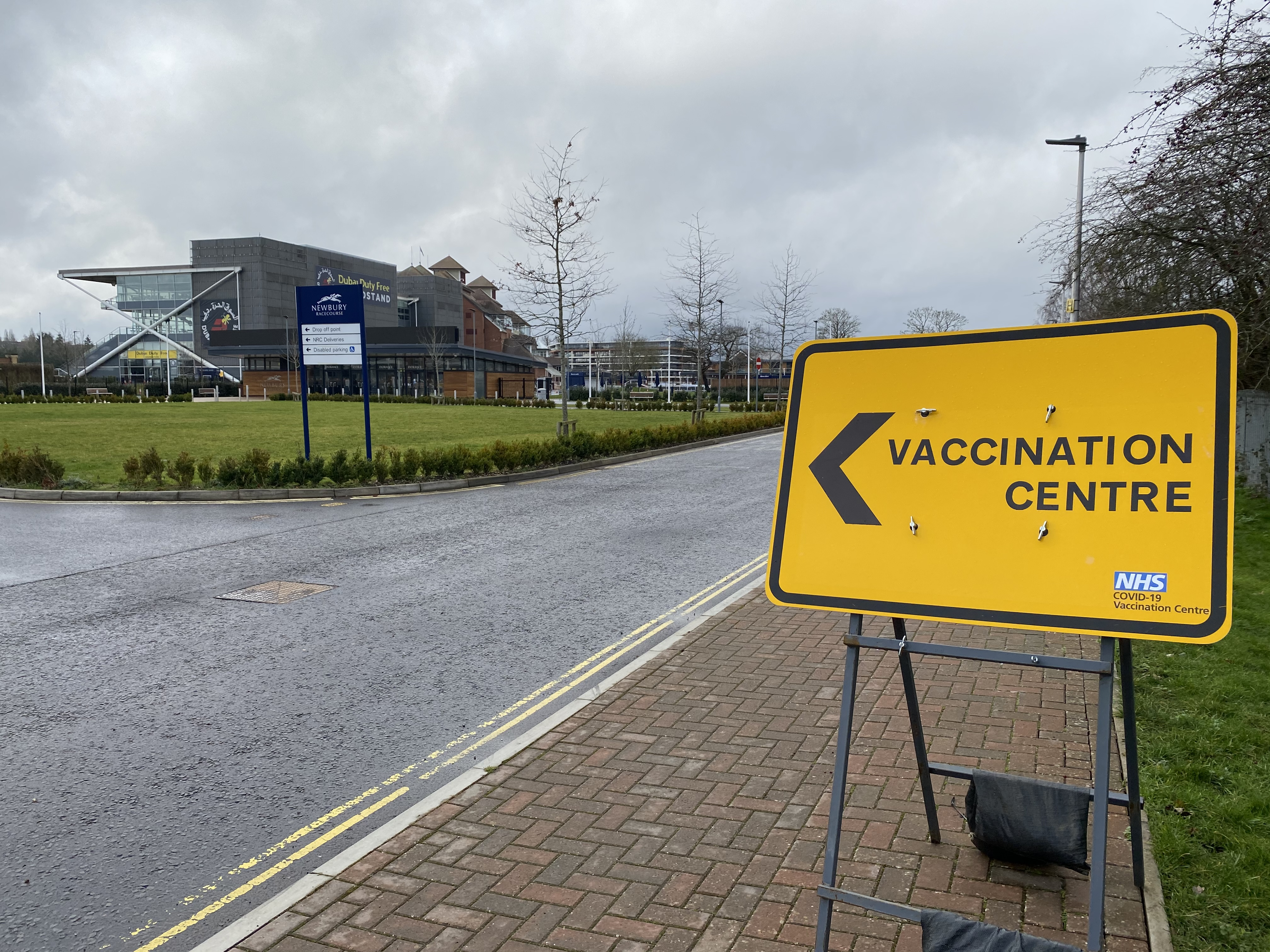
Vaccination centre in January 2021
