= Silver Trophy Handicap Chase =

Steeplechase horse race in Britain

Silver Trophy Chase
2025
Riskintheground	O'Moore Park	Bhaloo

Previous years
2024
In Excelsis Deo	Hang In There	Scarface
2023
Caribean Boy	Super Six	Gemirande
2022
Stolen Silver	Simply The Betts	Coole Cody
2021
Manofthemountain	Magic Saint	Romain De Senam

2020-2011
2019
Mister Whitaker	Got Away	Highway One O One
2018
Traffic Fluide	Art Of Payroll	Kalondra
2017
Henryville	Foxtail Hill	Casino Markets
2016
Voix D'eau	Art Mauresque	Johns Spirit
2015
Anay Turge	French Opera	Carrigmorna King
2014
Buywise	Astracad	Real Milan
2013
Champion Court	Menorah	Hunt Ball
2012
Hector's Choice	Aerial	The Cockney Mackem
2011
Poquelin	Holmwood Legend	De Boitron

2010-2001
2010
Duc De Regniere	I'm So Lucky	From Dawn To Dusk
2009
Atouchbetweenacara	Private Be	Mr Boo
2008
Stan	Il Duce	Glenfinn Captain
2007
Nycteos	Too Forward	Madison Du Berlais
2006
Our Vic	Too Forward	Monkerhostin
2005
Quazar	Le Roi Miguel	Therealbandit
2004
Seebald	Tikram	Jakari
2003
Poliantas	Fondmort	Upgrade
2002
Fadalko	Wahiba Sands	Earthmover

2000-1991
2000
Upgrade	Native Charm	The Land Agent
1999
Super Tactics	Northern Starlight	Mulligan
1998
The Grey Monk	Pimberley Place	Pete The Parson
1997
Strong Promise	Gales Cavalier	Viking Flagship
1996
Gales Cavalier	Viking Flagship	Travado
1995
Coulton	Young Hustler	Southolt
1994
Gale Again	Elfast	Far Senior
1993
Beech Road	Calapaez	Katabatic
1992
Katabatic	Waterloo Boy	Golden Freeze
1991
Norton's Coin	Waterloo Boy	Pegwell Bay

1990-1988
1990
Barnbrook Again	Pegwell Bay	Ida's Delight
1989
Norton's Coin	Aughavogue	Beau Ranger
1988
Beau Ranger	Chief Ironside	Bishops Yarn

The Silver Trophy Handicap Chase is a Grade 2 National Hunt steeplechase in Great Britain which is open to horses aged five years or older. It is run on the New Course at Cheltenham over a distance of about 2 miles and 4½ furlongs (2 miles 4 furlongs and 127 yards, or 4,139 metres), and during its running there are seventeen fences to be jumped. It is a limited handicap race. It is scheduled to take place each year in mid April.

The event was established in 1986, and its original distance was 2 miles and 4 furlongs. It was given Grade 2 status in 1991, and it was extended to its present length in 1993. For a period it was a conditions race, but it became a limited handicap in 2003.

== Records ==
Most successful horse (2 wins):

- Norton's Coin – 1989,1991
- Riskintheground - 2025,2026

Leading jockey (3 wins):

- Tony McCoy – Upgrade (2000), Seebald (2004), Quazar (2005)
- Ruby Walsh – Poliantas (2003), Nycteos (2007), Poquelin (2011)

Leading trainer (4 wins):

- Martin Pipe – Beau Ranger (1988), Upgrade (2000), Seebald (2004), Our Vic (2006)
- Paul Nicholls – Fadalko (2002), Poliantas (2003), Nycteos (2007), Poquelin (2011)

== Winners ==
- Weights given in stones and pounds.

Year	Winner	Age	Weight	Jockey	Trainer
1986	Mr Moonraker	9	11-02	Brendan Powell	Les Kennard
1987	Duke of Milan	10	10-02	Simon Sherwood	Nick Gaselee
1988	Beau Ranger	10	11-00	Peter Scudamore	Martin Pipe
1989	Norton's Coin	8	11-00	Richard Dunwoody	Sirrel Griffiths
1990	Barnbrook Again	9	11–10	Hywel Davies	David Elsworth
1991	Norton's Coin	10	11-04	Graham McCourt	Sirrel Griffiths
1992	Katabatic	9	11-04	Luke Harvey	Andrew Turnell
1993	Beech Road	11	11-00	Richard Dunwoody	Toby Balding
1994	Gale Again	7	11-04	Declan Murphy	Tommy Stack
1995 (Note: The 1995 and 1999 runnings took place at Sandown Park)	Coulton	8	11-07	Jamie Osborne	Oliver Sherwood
1996	Gales Cavalier	8	11-04	Mark Dwyer	David Gandolfo
1997	Strong Promise	6	11-07	Norman Williamson	Geoff Hubbard
1998	The Grey Monk	10	11-07	Tony Dobbin	Gordon W. Richards
1999	Super Tactics	11	11-04	Andrew Thornton	Robert Alner
2000	Upgrade	6	11-05	Tony McCoy	Martin Pipe
	no race 2001 (Note: The 2001 running was cancelled because of the 2001 United Kingdom foot-and-mouth outbreak)				
2002	Fadalko	9	11–10	Mick Fitzgerald	Paul Nicholls
2003	Poliantas	6	11-01	Ruby Walsh	Paul Nicholls
2004	Seebald	9	10–13	Tony McCoy	Martin Pipe
2005	Quazar	7	10-04	Tony McCoy	Jonjo O'Neill
2006	Our Vic	8	11-01	Timmy Murphy	Martin Pipe
2007	Nycteos	6	10-04	Ruby Walsh	Paul Nicholls
2008	Stan	9	10-07	Aidan Coleman	Venetia Williams
2009	Atouchbetweenacara	8	10-04	Aidan Coleman	Venetia Williams
2010	Duc de Regniere	8	10-09	Barry Geraghty	Nicky Henderson
2011	Poquelin	8	11–10	Ruby Walsh	Paul Nicholls
2012	Hector's Choice	8	11-01	Jamie Moore	Richard Lee
2013	Champion Court	8	10-07	Ian Popham	Martin Keighley
2014	Buywise	7	10–12	Paul Moloney	Evan Williams
2015	Anay Turge	10	10-04	Tom Scudamore	Nigel Hawke
2016	Voix D'Eau	6	09-13	Michael Legg (Note: amateur rider)	Harry Fry
2017	Henryville	9	10-06	Niall Madden	Harry Fry
2018	Traffic Fluide	8	10-04	Joshua Moore	Gary Moore
2019	Mister Whitaker	7	11-09	Jonathan Burke	Mick Channon
	no race 2020 (Note: The 2020 running was cancelled because of the COVID-19 pandemic in the United Kingdom)				
2021	Manofthemountain	8	10-04	Tom Bellamy	Emma Lavelle
2022	Stolen Silver	7	10-13	Sam Twiston-Davies	Sam Thomas
2023	Caribean Boy	9	11-12	Daryl Jacob	Nicky Henderson
2024	In Excelsis Deo	6	10-12	Jonathan Burke	Harry Fry
2025	Riskintheground	8	10-06	Harry Skelton	Dan Skelton
2026	Riskintheground	9	11-04	Harry Skelton	Dan Skelton

== See also ==
- Horse racing in Great Britain
- List of British National Hunt races
