= JCB Triumph Hurdle Trial =

JCB Triumph Hurdle Trial may refer to:

- Prestbury Juvenile Hurdle, a horse race held at Cheltenham Racecourse each November
- Finesse Juvenile Hurdle, a horse race held at Cheltenham Racecourse each January
