= Fairlawne Handicap Chase =

Steeplechase horse race in Britain

Fairlawne Handicap Chase
2026
Matata	Il Ridoto	Grandeur D'ame

Previous years
2025
Springwell Bay	Marble Sands	Seddon
2024
Shakem Up'arry	Frero Banbou	Al Dancer
2023
Midnight River	Stolen Silver	Nassalam
2022
Vienna Court	Simply The Betts	Alnadam

2020-2011
2020
Oldgrangewood	Saint Calvados	Lalor
2019
Aso	Happy Diva	Ballyhill
2018
Ballyhill	Shantou Flyer	Sametegal
2017
Shantou Flyer	Village Vic	Top Gamble
2016
Village Vic	Tenor Nivernais	Top Gamble
2015
Splash of Ginge	Hunt Ball	Caid Du Berlais
2014
Double Ross	Cedre Bleu	Kumbeshwar
2012
Calgary Bay	Hector's Choice	Matuhi
2011
Tartak	Carole's Legacy	Mahogany Blaze

2010-2001
2010
Can't Buy Time	Private Be	Mister McGoldrick
2009
Stan	Fier Normand	Hold Em
2008
Vodka Bleu	Patman Du Charmil	Model Son
2007
Too Forward	Nozic	Le Volfoni
2006
Fondmort	Too Forward	Made in Japan
2005
Le Duc	Redemption	Kandjar D'allier
2004
Whereareyounow	Spring Grove	Foly Pleasant
2003
Ballinclay King	Katarino	Grey Abbey

2000-1990
2000
The Outback Way	Storm Damage	Northern Starlight
1999
Eirespray	Mr Strong Gale	Jathib
1998
Pete The Parson	Unguided Missile	Nahthen Lad
1994
Southern Minstrel	Lake Teereen	Only two finished
1992
Nodform	Wigtown Bay	Another Coral
1991
New Halen	Al Hashimi	Iron Gray
1990
Paddyboro	Private Views	Dudie

The Fairlawne Handicap Chase, currently run under the sponsored title of the Paddy Power New Year's Day Handicap Chase, is a Grade 3 National Hunt steeplechase in Great Britain which is open to horses aged five years or older. It is run on the New Course at Cheltenham over a distance of about 2 miles and 4½ furlongs (2 miles 4 furlongs and 127 yards, or 4,139 metres) and during its running there are 17 fences to be jumped. It is a handicap race, and is scheduled to take place each year on New Year's Day.

The race was first run in 1990 as the Cleeve Hill Handicap Chase and was awarded Grade 3 status in 2009.

From 2014 the race became officially known as the Fairlawne Chase, a name previously associated with a three-mile conditions chase run at Windsor until 1997.

== Winners ==
Year	Winner	Age	Weight	Jockey	Trainer
1990	Paddyboro	12	11–13	Richard Rowe	Josh Gifford
1991 (Note: The 1991 and 1992 runnings took place on New Year's Eve of the preceding year)	New Halen	9	09-12	Eamon Tierney	Paul James
1992	Nodform	7	10–12	Declan Murphy	Josh Gifford
1993	Abandoned due to frost
1994	Southern Minstrel	11	10-06	Adrian Maguire	Peter Cheesbrough
1995	Abandoned due to frost
1996	Abandoned due to frost
1997	Abandoned due to frost
1998	Pete The Parson	9	10-02	Mick Fitzgerald	Jim Old
1999	Eirespray	8	10-07	Seamus Durack	Sue Smith
2000	The Outback Way	10	11-10	Norman Williamson	Venetia Williams
2001	Abandoned due to frost
2002	Abandoned due to frost
2003	Ballinclay King	9	10–11	Davy Russell	Ferdy Murphy
2004	Whereareyounow	7	10-01	Carl Llewellyn	Nigel Twiston-Davies
2005	Le Duc	6	10-08	Ruby Walsh	Paul Nicholls
2006	Fondmort	10	11–12	Mick Fitzgerald	Nicky Henderson
2007	Too Forward	11	11-04	Timmy Murphy	Carl Llewellyn
2008	Vodka Bleu	9	10–13	Timmy Murphy	David Pipe
2009	Stan	9	11-00	Aidan Coleman	Venetia Williams
2010	Can't Buy Time	8	11-00	Tony McCoy	Jonjo O'Neill
2011	Tartak	8	11-08	Paddy Brennan	Tom George
2012	Calgary Bay	9	10-04	Dominic Elsworth	Henrietta Knight
2013	Abandoned due to waterlogging
2014	Double Ross	8	11-05	Sam Twiston-Davies	Nigel Twiston-Davies
2015	Splash of Ginge	7	11-02	Jamie Bargary	Nigel Twiston-Davies
2016	Village Vic	9	10-10	Richard Johnson	Philip Hobbs
2017	Shantou Flyer	7	11-02	Aidan Coleman	Rebecca Curtis
2018	Ballyhill	7	10-02	Jamie Bargary	Nigel Twiston-Davies
2019	Aso	9	11-12	Charlie Deutsch	Venetia Williams
2020	Oldgrangewood	9	10-07	Harry Skelton	Dan Skelton
2021	Abandoned due to waterlogging
2022	Vienna Court	7	10-06	Sam Twiston-Davies	Nigel Twiston-Davies
2023	Midnight River	8	11-04	Harry Skelton	Dan Skelton
2024	Shakem Up'Arry	10	10-02	Ben Jones	Ben Pauling
2025	Springwell Bay	8	11-03	Jonjo O'Neill Jr	Jonjo O'Neill
2026	Matata	8	11-12	Sam Twiston-Davies	Nigel Twiston-Davies & Willie Twiston-Davies

== See also ==
- Horse racing in Great Britain
- List of British National Hunt races
