= New Year's Day Hurdle =

Discontinued hurdle horse race in Britain

The New Year's Day Hurdle was a National Hunt hurdle race in England which was open to horses aged four years and older. It was run at Windsor over a distance of 2 miles (3,218 metres), and was scheduled to take place each year on New Year's Day (January 1).

The race was first run in 1975 and was last run in 1998, when Windsor stopped hosting National Hunt racing. National Hunt racing returned to Windsor temporarily in 2004 when Ascot was closed for renovations, and Windsor hosted the Long Walk Hurdle.

The race was initially a Conditions race, attracting high quality hurdlers, but became a Limited Handicap in 1993, reduced to an ordinary handicap in 1998. The race was revived on 1 January 2026 with Windsor once again racing on New Year's Day. It is a £100,000 Class 2 handicap hurdle run over 2 miles 4 furlongs, sponsored by Fitzdares.

== Winners ==
Year	Winner	Age	Jockey	Trainer
1975	Flash Imp	6	P Beasant	Ron Smyth
1976	Comedy of Errors	9	Ken White	Fred Rimell
1977	Strombolus	6	Ron Barry	Peter Bailey
1978	Beacon Light	7	Andy Turnell	Bob Turnell
1979	Abandoned because of snow
1980	Abandoned because of frost
1981	Celtic Ryde	6	Hywel Davies	Peter Cundell
1982	Celtic Ryde	7	Hywel Davies	Peter Cundell
1983	Sula Bula	5	Tim Easterby	Peter Easterby
1984	Secret Ballot	9	Ted Waite	Andy Turnell
1985	Ra Nova	6	Richard Dunwoody	Nan Kennedy
1986	Southemair	6	Alan Webb	Peter Haynes
1987	Ra Nova	8	Mark Perrett	Ian Matthews
1988	Celtic Shot	6	Peter Scudamore	Fred Winter
1989	Wishlon	6	Ian Shoemark	Ron Smyth
1990	Aldino	7	Jamie Osborne	Oliver Sherwood
1991	Royal Derbi	6	Declan Murphy	Neville Callaghan
1992	Shu Fly	8	Alan Jones	Sally Oliver
1993	Muse	6	Antony Procter	David Elsworth
1994	Absalom's Lady	6	Paul Holley	David Elsworth
1995	Abandoned due to frost
1996	Abandoned due to frost
1997	Abandoned due to frost
1998	Halona	8	Dean Gallagher	Charlie Morlock

== See also ==
- Horse racing in Great Britain
- List of British National Hunt races
