= Norton's Coin =

British-bred Thoroughbred racehorse

- Racing silks of Sirrell Griffiths
- Sire: Mount Cassino
- Grandsire: Varano
- Dam: Grove Chance
- Damsire: St Columbus
- Sex: Gelding
- Foaled: 16 March 1981
- Country: United Kingdom
- Colour: Chestnut
- Breeder: Percy Thomas
- Owner: Percy Thomas; Sirrell Griffiths
- Trainer: Sirrell Griffiths
- Record: 33: 6-8-3
- Earnings: £138,990

Major wins
- Silver Trophy Chase (1989, 1991); Cheltenham Gold Cup (1990)

Norton's Coin (16 March 1981 – 15 January 2001) was a British Thoroughbred racehorse, best known for his 100/1 win in the 1990 Cheltenham Gold Cup. He was an obscurely-bred gelding owned and trained in Wales by Sirrell Griffiths, a dairy farmer who had only two other horses in his stable.

After success on the amateur Point-to-point circuit and in hunter chases Norton's Coin graduated to professional competition as a seven-year-old in 1988. In his first season under National Hunt rules he showed promise and won the Silver Trophy Chase in April at Cheltenham Racecourse. He struggled to win in the following season, but left all his previous form well behind to record his most famous win over Toby Tobias and the favourite Desert Orchid in Britain's most important weight-for-age steeplechase.

Norton's Coin was injured in winning the Gold Cup and won only once (a repeat win in the Silver Trophy) in his remaining eighteen races. He developed breathing problems and was retired in 1993. He spent his retirement on Griffiths' farm before dying from a suspected heart attack in January 2001.

== Background ==
Norton's Coin was a gelding with a white blaze, described by his owner as an "ugly, plain chestnut". He was the only horse of any consequence sired by Mount Cassino, a fairly useful racehorse but not a top-class performer (rated 92 by Timeform), who recorded the better of his two wins in a handicap race at Sandown Park Racecourse in 1973. Norton's Coin was the only foal produced by his dam Grove Chance, an unraced mare who was descended from Bebe Grande, the leading British two-year-old filly of 1952. Bebe Grand's other descendants have included Lure and the Eclipse Stakes winner Pieces of Eight. At the time of Norton's Coin's conception, both his parents were owned by Sirrell Griffiths, a dairy farmer who kept a few horses at Rwyth Farm near the village of Nantgaredig in Carmarthenshire. He had bought the stallion and the mare for 700 guineas and £500 respectively. Griffiths sold the pregnant Grove Chance to Percy Thomas, who was officially Norton's Coin's breeder.

Norton's Coin began his racing career on the amateur Point-to-point circuit and won several races for Percy Thomas. After the horse won one of his two hunter chases in 1987 Griffiths bought Norton's Coin back for approximately £5000 in 1987 and trained him throughout the rest of his racing career. In his point-to-point races and in his hunter chase win, the gelding was ridden by the leading Welsh amateur jockey Tim Jones. In late 1988, Jones was attending a dinner dance for the local point-to-point community when he was asked about the prospects of local horses by the guest speaker Peter Scudamore: Jones told Scudamore that Norton's Coin would win a Gold Cup. Griffiths was the holder of a training permit rather than a full licence, meaning that he was only allowed to train horses which he (or his immediate family) also owned.

== Racing career ==
=== 1988/1989 National Hunt season ===
Norton's Coin began his career in professional company by finishing third in a minor handicap chase at Warwick Racecourse in December 1988. Later that month he finished second in two handicaps at Hereford Racecourse and then finished fourth when favourite for a similar event at Chepstow in January. Norton's Coin's form began to improve in spring and he recorded his first success when ridden by Richard Dunwoody to a ten-length win at Bangor-on-Dee Racecourse on 8 March. He made his first appearance at the Cheltenham Festival eight days later when he started a 25/1 outsider for the two and a half mile Cathcart Challenge Cup. Ridden by Hywel Davies, he was towards the rear of the nine-runner field before making steady progress to finish second behind Observer Corps. His race came an hour after Desert Orchid had won the Gold Cup at the same venue. Norton's Coin was then moved up in distance for a three-mile handicap chase at Newbury and won by three lengths from Fair Child. On his final appearance of the season, the gelding was ridden by Dunwoody when he started a 20/1 outsider for the Silver Trophy Chase over two and a half miles at Cheltenham on 19 April. He raced behind the leaders before taking the lead on the run-in and won by two and a half lengths from Aughavogue, with the other beaten horses including Beau Ranger, Panto Prince and Golden Freeze.

=== 1989/1990 National Hunt season ===
After a break of more than eight months, Norton's Coin returned on 26 December when he was moved up sharply in class to contest the King George VI Chase over three miles at Kempton Park Racecourse. Starting a 33/1 outsider, he was ridden for the first time by Graham McCourt who became his regular jockey. He made several jumping errors and began to tire two fences out before finishing last of the six runners, thirty-nine lengths behind the winner Desert Orchid. A drop back to two miles in January brought no improvement as he finished ninth of ten in the Victor Chandler Chase. Later that month he showed better form when running second in a handicap at Cheltenham, conceding ten pounds to the winner, and then finished third on heavy ground when favourite a handicap at Newbury in February. After the Newbury race, the gelding contracted a throat infection which interrupted his training. Griffiths had entered the horse for the Gold Cup early in the season but Norton's Coin's moderate form and health problems led him to look for alternative targets at the Cheltenham Festival. When he realised that the horse was ineligible for the Cathcart, and had missed the entry deadline for the Mildmay of Flete Handicap Chase, he reverted to his original plan and allowed him to take his chance in the championship race. Griffiths said that he was hoping to finish in the first six in order to recover the £1,000 entry fee.

On 15 March 1990 Norton's Coin, ridden by McCourt, started at odds of 100/1 in a twelve-runner field for the 63rd running of the Cheltenham Gold Cup. On the morning of the race, Griffiths milked his cows before driving the horse trailer carrying his horse to the racecourse. Desert Orchid was made the 10/11 favourite ahead of Bonanza Boy (winner of the Racing Post Chase and Welsh National) and the Jenny Pitman-trained Toby Tobias. The other contenders included Cavvies Clown (Jim Ford Challenge Cup), Nick The Brief (Irish Gold Cup), Maid of Money (Irish Grand National), Yahoo (runner -up in the previous year and winner of the Martell Cup) and Pegwell Bay (Mackeson Gold Cup, December Gold Cup). McCourt allowed the outsider to race at the back of the main group but moved steadily forward and was close behind the leaders Desert Orchid and Ten of Spades at the end of the first circuit at which point Pegwell Bay, Yahoo and Toby Tobias were also well-placed. At the third last he was in a close fourth behind Desert Orchid, Ten of Spades and Toby Tobias, with most of the other runners beginning to struggle, and moved up into second behind Toby Tobias and the tiring Desert Orchid at the next fence, where Ten of Spades fell. Norton's Coin moved up alongside Toby Tobias at the final fence and got the better of a prolonged struggle on the run-in to win by three quarters of a length, with four lengths back to Desert Orchid in third place. The winning time of 6 minutes, 30.9 seconds was the fastest in the race since 1953.

The trophies were presented by the Queen Mother, who told Griffiths "I think it's marvellous to think that you've only got two horses and you can win a race like this. To think that my husband and I had racehorses almost all our lives and we haven't won a race like this".

Although the major bookmakers took few substantial bets on the horse, many minor betting shops in Wales sustained heavy losses owing to strong support from local gamblers. Despite the financial damage he had caused, Norton's Coin was invited to "open" a betting shop in Cardiff in May.

=== 1990/1991 National Hunt season ===
In the following season, Norton's Coin did not appear until January when he fell at the tenth fence in the Newton Chase at Haydock Park and then finished third behind Celtic Shot and Toby Tobias at Cheltenham. He failed to complete the course in his next two races, refusing at a fence in the Irish Gold Cup and falling at the third last when attempting to repeat his 1990 success in the Cheltenham Gold Cup. Later in the spring of 1991, Norton's Coin showed improved form. On 4 April in the Martell Cup at Aintree he recovered from a bad mistake at the second last to take the lead final fence but was overtaken on the run-in and beaten one and a half lengths by the Martin Pipe-trained Aquilifer. Two weeks later at Cheltenham he was matched against Pegwell Bay and the outstanding two-mile chaser Waterloo Boy as he contested the Silver Trophy Chase for a second time. McCourt settled the gelding in third place before taking the lead from Pegwell Bay at the last and held off the late challenge of Waterloo Boy to win by a head.

On 4 May Norton's Coin made his first and last appearance over hurdles when he finished second of the ten runners in the Grade 2 Staffordshire Hurdle, a length behind the winner Randolph Place. In June he made his only appearance in a flat race when he was ridden by Lester Piggott in the Queen Alexandra Stakes at Royal Ascot. Starting at odds of 10/1 he never looked likely to win and finished eighth behind Easy To Please.

=== Later career ===
Norton's Coin failed to win in his two remaining seasons. Griffiths believed that the horse's loss of form was due to a failed surgical procedure intended to correct a breathing problem.

In the early part of the 1991/1992 National Hunt season he finished second to Katabatic at Chepstow and then produced his best effort of the season in the Peterborough Chase at Huntingdon Racecourse finishing four lengths second to Sabin du Loir and a short head in front of Desert Orchid at level weights. In the King George VI Chase at Kempton he came home last of the five finishers behind The Fellow, Docklands Express, Remittance Man and Toby Tobias. After finishing fifth in the Agfa Diamond Chase he appeared for the third time in the Cheltenham Gold Cup but made no impact and was pulled up by McCourt after the third last. In his two remaining races that season Norton's Coin fell at the second fence in the Martell Cup and finished last of the four runners behind Katabatic, Waterloo Boy and Golden Freeze in the Silver Trophy.

In his final season, Norton's Coin showed no worthwhile form in three races. He finished last at Wincanton in October and last again at Chepstow in November. On his last appearance he was dropped in class for a minor handicap at Newbury in February but was already out of contention when he refused to jump the third last fence.

== Retirement ==
After retiring from racing, Norton's Coin returned to Griffiths' farm in Wales and was never ridden again reportedly enjoying his life of leisure and remaining in excellent health until the age of 19. On the morning of 15 January Griffiths turned the horse out into the field and returned to find that the horse had collapsed and died, probably from a heart attack. Griffiths commented; "He was one of the family, but we can't do much about it. It's a pity we can't all go the same way instead of suffering goodness knows what".

== Pedigree ==
Pedigree of Norton's Coin (GB), chestnut gelding, 1981
Sire Mount Cassino (GB) 1970	Varano (GB); 1962	Darius	Dante
Sire Mount Cassino (GB) 1970	Varano (GB); 1962	Darius	Yasna
Sire Mount Cassino (GB) 1970	Varano (GB); 1962	Varna	Bey
Sire Mount Cassino (GB) 1970	Varano (GB); 1962	Varna	Vampa
Sire Mount Cassino (GB) 1970	Fusilade; 1961	High Treason	Court Martial
Sire Mount Cassino (GB) 1970	Fusilade; 1961	High Treason	Eastern Grandeur
Sire Mount Cassino (GB) 1970	Fusilade; 1961	Arquebuse	Niccolo dell'Arca
Sire Mount Cassino (GB) 1970	Fusilade; 1961	Arquebuse	Buse Bondree
Dam Grove Chance 1977	St Columbus (GB); 1967	Saint Crespin	Aureole
Dam Grove Chance 1977	St Columbus (GB); 1967	Saint Crespin	Neocracy
Dam Grove Chance 1977	St Columbus (GB); 1967	Lovely Lady	My Love
Dam Grove Chance 1977	St Columbus (GB); 1967	Lovely Lady	Flying Colours
Dam Grove Chance 1977	Spotty Bebe (GB); 1967	Credo	Crepello
Dam Grove Chance 1977	Spotty Bebe (GB); 1967	Credo	Marsyaka
Dam Grove Chance 1977	Spotty Bebe (GB); 1967	Bebe Royale	Royal Palm
Dam Grove Chance 1977	Spotty Bebe (GB); 1967	Bebe Royale	Bebe Grande (Family 3-o)
