= Put The Kettle On =

Irish Thoroughbred racehorse

- Sire: Stowaway
- Grandsire: Slip Anchor
- Dam: Name For Fame
- Damsire: Quest For Fame
- Sex: Mare
- Foaled: 10 March 2014
- Country: Ireland
- Colour: Bay
- Breeder: Butlersgrove Stud
- Owner: One For Luck Racing Syndicate
- Trainer: Henry De Bromhead
- Record: 16: 9-2-4
- Earnings: £422,247

Major wins
- November Novices' Chase (2019); Arkle Challenge Trophy (2020); Shloer Chase (2020); Champion Chase (2021)

Put The Kettle On (foaled 10 March 2014) is an Irish racehorse who competes in National Hunt racing. She won two minor races over hurdles but made dramatic improvement when campaigned in steeplechases. In the 2019/2020 National Hunt season she won six races including the November Novices' Chase and the Arkle Challenge Trophy. In the following season she won the Shloer Chase and the Champion Chase.

== Background ==
Put The Kettle On is a bay mare bred by Charlie Purcell at the Butlersgrove Stud in County Kilkenny. As a three-year-old in June 2017 she was consigned to the Goffs June Land Rover NH Sale and was bought for €22,000 by Keith Phelan. She went into training with Henry De Bromhead at Knockeen, County Waterford and races in the colours of the One For Luck Racing Syndicate.

She was sired by Stowaway, who won the Gordon Stakes and the Great Voltigeur Stakes in 1997. Stowaway made some impact as a National Hunt stallion, also siring Champagne Fever, Outlander (Lexus Chase) and Monkfish (Broadway Novices' Chase). Put The Kettle On's dam Name For Fame won one race on the flat in France before being purchased by the Purcell family and continuing her career in Ireland where she won a hurdle race at Cork Racecourse in 2005. As a descendant of the American broodmare Mock Orange (foaled 1959), she came from a family which had produced several major flat race winners including Equiano, Cryptoclearance and Devil May Care.

== Racing career ==
=== 2018/19 season ===
Put The Kettle On began her racing career by finishing fifth in a Novice's Hurdle at Clonmel Racecourse on 20 September 2018 and then ran second in a similar event at Wexford Racecourse in October. On 25 November she started at odds of 11/4 for a mares-only novice hurdle at Navan Racecourse and recorded her first success as she led from the start and won by a length from the favourite Gypsy Island. In her two other races that season she finished fifth when favourite for a novice hurdle at Limerick Racecourse in December and fifth in a Handicap at Gowran Park in January.

=== 2019/20 season ===
On 2 May at Punchestown Put The Kettle On finished third in a handicap hurdle, after which she was mainly campaigned in novice chases. Over two and a half miles at Kilbeggan Racecourse on 15 May she made a successful debut over the larger obstacles as she won by a length and a quarter from ten opponents at odds of 5/4. On 16 June she returned to hurdles for a final time and won a mares' handicap at Downpatrick Racecourse, leading from the start and coming home seven lengths clear of Dollys Destination. The mare ended her summer campaign at Tipperary Racecourse on 21 July when Rachael Blackmore rode her to a seven and a half length victory in a novice chase over two and a half miles on good ground.

After a six-week break, Put The Kettle On returned to the track at Wexford on 7 September for a novice chase in which she was ridden by the apprentice jockey Hugh Morgan and won by two and a quarter lengths from Victoria Bay after leading from the start. She was then stepped up in class for the Grade 3 Like A Butterfly Novice Chase at Tipperary in October in which she finished second, beaten half a length by the Willie Mullins-trained mare Robin de Carlow. On 17 November the mare was sent to England for the Grade 2 Arkle Trophy Trial Novices' Chase at Cheltenham Racecourse and started the 6/1 outsider of the four runners behind Al Dancer (winner of the Betfair Hurdle), Getaway Trump and Rouge Vif (Kelso Novices' Hurdle). Partnered by Aidan Coleman she led from the start and kept on well in the closing stages to win by two and a half lengths from Al Dancer. After the race De Bromhead said "I'm delighted and it was a great ride by Aidan... She loves jumping. We said we'd drop her back over two miles and let her rock and roll, and she really enjoyed it", while Coleman commented "She was super and jumped exceptionally... she was very economical, which made a difference... There was no fluke about it".

Put The Kettle On returned to Cheltenham on 10 March and started a 16/1 outsider for the Grade 1 Arkle Challenge Trophy over two miles. Her stablemate Notebook (winner of the Arkle Novice Chase) started favourite, while the other nine runners included Al Dancer, Rouge Vif, Fakir d'Oudairies (Drinmore Novice Chase) and Esprit du Large (Henry VIII Novices' Chase). With Coleman in the saddle, Put The Kettle On was among the leaders from the start and gained the advantage three fences from the finish. Although strongly pressed by Fakir d'Oudairies on the run-in she kept on "gamely" to win by one and a half lengths. Coleman commented "All the way I absolutely was having some craic - then turning in, I was going to be sick if I got beaten. I turned off the bend and gave her a kick down to the second last and she absolutely lifted into the middle of it and I thought 'brilliant, we're away now'. Then I was just praying. If she'd have got beat she'd have been very unlucky, but she's a very good mare. It's her jumping - it is a joy to behold. She's just brilliant".

=== 2020/21 season ===
Put The Kettle On began her next campaign in the Shloer Chase over two miles on soft ground at Cheltenham on 15 November in which she was ridden by Coleman and started the 7/4 second favourite behind the multiple Grade 1 winner Defi du Seuil in a four-runner field. She was in contention throughout the race, recovered a mistake at the third last, and overtook the front-running Duc Des Genievres in the closing stages to win by one and a quarter lengths. After the race Coleman said "She has got a massive heart as she hated the ground. She was never happy the whole way. It was a testament to her ability and her attitude as it was a hard race for her. Since November last year, she has only run once, so she might be a touch rusty. When I got on top, I won well". In the Grade 1 Paddy's Reward Club Chase at Leopardstown Racecourse on 27 December the mare was ridden by Sean Flanagan and finished third behind Chacun Pour Soi and Notebook, beaten more than eight lengths by the winner.

On 17 March Put The Kettle On made her second appearance at the Cheltenham Festival and went off the 17/2 second favourite behind Chacun Pour Soi for the Grade 1 Champion Chase. The other seven runners were Notebook, Rouge Vif, First Flow (Clarence House Chase), Nube Negra (Desert Orchid Chase), Cilaos Energy (Hilly Way Chase), Sceau Royal (Game Spirit Chase) and Greaneteen (Haldon Gold Cup). The mare raced in second place behind Rouge Vif for most of the race before going to the front at the third last. She was overtaken by the favourite approaching the final fence but rallied on the run-in to regain the advantage and won by half a length from the fast-finishing Nube Negra. Henry De Bromhead admitted that he had considered bypassing the race in favour of the Liberthine Mares' Chase two days later but said "I spoke to the owners and we looked at the stats of Arkle winners [in this race], it's her trip and she loves the course, so we thought we'd give it a lash and see. She's a bit crackers the whole time, to be honest, she's just quite wild, but a real character. She's nuts, but in a great way". Coleman commented "Her tenacity and attitude is something to behold. She doesn’t give you anything easy but when you are on her side, you couldn’t have a more willing partner".

=== 2021/22 season ===
Put The Kettle On's first race of the season was again the Shloer Chase, where she went off 15/8 favourite to repeat her win of the previous season but was beaten into third place, 10½ lengths behind Nube Negra and Politologue. In January 2022 she finished last of five runners in the John and Chich Fowler Memorial Mares Chase at Fairyhouse, beaten 42 lengths by Mount Ida. At the Cheltenham Festival in March she finished fifth of seven runners in the Champion Chase, beaten 27 lengths by Energumene. After these disappointing results, her owners announced that she would retire from the racecourse and be put up for sale as a broodmare at Goffs Aintree Sale. One of the part-owners said: "We'd love to keep her but we don't have the facilities or the expertise to cater for a broodmare like her. She was a queen on the track and I have no doubt she will be a queen off it."

She retired as the winner of nine of her 20 starts.

== Pedigree ==
Pedigree of Put The Kettle On, bay mare, 2014
| Sire Stowaway (GB) 1994 | Slip Anchor (GB); 1982 | Shirley Heights (IRE) | Mill Reef |
| Sire Stowaway (GB) 1994 | Slip Anchor (GB); 1982 | Shirley Heights (IRE) | Hardiemma |
| Sire Stowaway (GB) 1994 | Slip Anchor (GB); 1982 | Sayonara (GER) | Birkhahn |
| Sire Stowaway (GB) 1994 | Slip Anchor (GB); 1982 | Sayonara (GER) | Suleika |
| Sire Stowaway (GB) 1994 | On Credit (FR); 1988 | No Pass No Sale (IRE) | Northfields |
| Sire Stowaway (GB) 1994 | On Credit (FR); 1988 | No Pass No Sale (IRE) | No Disgrace |
| Sire Stowaway (GB) 1994 | On Credit (FR); 1988 | Noble Tiara (USA) | Vaguely Noble |
| Sire Stowaway (GB) 1994 | On Credit (FR); 1988 | Noble Tiara (USA) | Tayyara |
| Dam Name For Fame (USA) 1999 | Quest For Fame (GB); 1987 | Rainbow Quest (USA) | Blushing Groom (FR) |
| Dam Name For Fame (USA) 1999 | Quest For Fame (GB); 1987 | Rainbow Quest (USA) | I Will Follow |
| Dam Name For Fame (USA) 1999 | Quest For Fame (GB); 1987 | Aryenne (FR) | Green Dancer (USA) |
| Dam Name For Fame (USA) 1999 | Quest For Fame (GB); 1987 | Aryenne (FR) | Americaine |
| Dam Name For Fame (USA) 1999 | Berceau (USA); 1989 | Alleged | Hoist The Flag |
| Dam Name For Fame (USA) 1999 | Berceau (USA); 1989 | Alleged | Princess Pout |
| Dam Name For Fame (USA) 1999 | Berceau (USA); 1989 | River Lullaby | Riverman |
| Dam Name For Fame (USA) 1999 | Berceau (USA); 1989 | River Lullaby | Aladancer (Family: 4-m) |
