= Katchit =

Irish-bred Thoroughbred racehorse

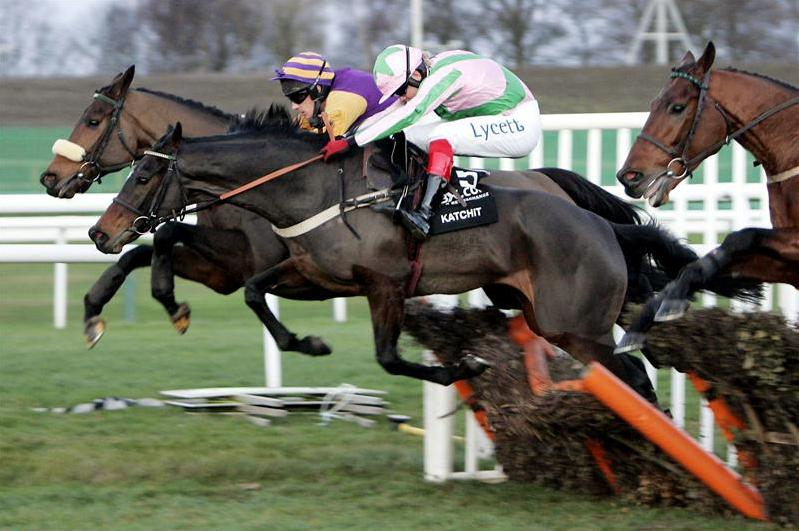
- Katchit at the 2007 Fighting Fifth Hurdle
- Sire: Kalanisi
- Dam: Miracle
- Damsire: Ezzoud
- Sex: Gelding
- Foaled: 23 February 2003
- Country: Ireland
- Colour: Bay
- Breeder: Whitley Stud
- Owner: Tim Corby; D S J P Syndicate
- Trainer: Mick Channon; Alan King
- Record: Flat 16:1-6-2; Hurdle 24:10-5-4; Total 40: 11-11-6
- Earnings: £599,708

Major wins
- Ryman Hurdle (2006); Finesse Juvenile Novices' Hurdle (2007); Triumph Hurdle (2007); Anniversary 4-Y-O Novices' Hurdle (2007); Kingwell Hurdle (2008); Champion Hurdle (2008)
- Last updated on 30 June 2009

Katchit (23 February 2003 – 9 January 2013) was an Irish-bred, British-trained Thoroughbred racehorse, the peak of whose flat racing and hurdling career came in 2008 when, against the odds, he won the Champion Hurdle at the Cheltenham Festival. Katchit was a moderate flat racer, winning only once in sixteen races. In his first two seasons as a hurdler however, he showed great improvement, winning ten times between September 2006 and March 2008. He won the Triumph Hurdle in 2007 and the Championship a year later. No Triumph Hurdle winner had gone on to win the Champion Hurdle since Kribensis in 1990, and 73 five-year-olds had been beaten in the race since See You Then registered the last five-year-old success in 1985. His later career was affected by injury and he never won again.

== Background ==
Katchit was a small bay horse with an irregular white star, bred in Ireland by the Whitley Stud. He was sired by the Breeders' Cup Turf winner Kalanisi out of a mare named Miracle. As a yearling, the colt was sent by the Irish-based Corduff Stud to the Tattersalls sales at Newmarket in October. He was bought for 15,500 guineas by the bloodstock agents Equine Services and entered into the ownership of Tim Corby. He was sent to be trained as a flat racer by Mick Channon.

== Racing career ==
=== 2005–2006: Flat racing ===
As a two-year-old in 2005, Katchit ran four times without winning, although he did finish second in a maiden race at Brighton Racecourse. In 2006, Katchit lost his first nine races, finishing second on four occasions. In July he won at the fourteenth attempt when taking a minor handicap race at Salisbury Racecourse. In a bar at the racecourse, Channon agreed the sale of Katchit to his fellow trainer Alan King for £30,000. King passed the horse on to the D S J P Syndicate and took him back to his stable at Barbury Castle in Wiltshire to be trained as a jumper. Before embarking on his hurdling career he had two more unsuccessful runs on the flat.

=== 2006–2011: Hurdle racing ===
==== 2006–2007: Novice Hurdle racing ====
In his first season under National Hunt rules, Katchit competed against horses of his own age in novice hurdle races for three and four-year-olds (sometimes called Juvenile Hurdles). He was the dominant horse in his division, winning seven of his eight races. After winning minor races at Market Rasen and Chepstow he was beaten by Degas Art in the Wensleydale Hurdle, but then recorded his first important success when taking the Grade II Ryman Hurdle at Cheltenham Racecourse in November. He further races at Cheltenham in both January and February (the Finesse Juvenile Novices' Hurdle) before returning for the Festival meeting where he contested the Grade I Triumph Hurdle. Ridden as usual by Robert "Choc" Thornton he started the 11/2 favourite in a field of twenty-three four-year-olds. Katchit tracked the leaders before taking the lead approaching the final hurdle, and pulled clear in the closing stages to win by nine lengths. Thornton was able to ease the horse down in the final strides and crossed the line waving his whip to the crowd. On his final start of the season he was sent to Aintree Racecourse for the Grade I Anniversary 4-Y-O Novices' Hurdle and won by four lengths from Punjabi and Degas Art. Commenting on the performance, Thornton said, "He's obviously got ability, but a lot of it is attitude – he just loves the game."

==== 2007–2008: Championship ====
In the 2007/2008 season, Katchit moved into open competition, with the Champion Hurdle as his objective. In December he sustained his first defeat in over a year when third to Harchibald in the Fighting Fifth Hurdle at Newcastle and then finished second to Osana at Cheltenham two weeks later. On his final start before the 2008 Cheltenham Festival he won the Kingwell Hurdle at Wincanton Racecourse, beating the high-class flat racer Blythe Knight (Diomed Stakes). The win established Katchit as a championship contender and was described by the Daily Telegraph's correspondent as "battling" and "terrier-like". In the Champion Hurdle on 11 March he was the 10/1 fifth choice in the betting behind Sizing Europe, Osana, Harchibald and Sublimity. Thornton positioned Katchit among the leaders from the start before moving up to take the lead two hurdles from the finish. He was challenged by Osana at the last, but stayed on under strong pressure to win by a length, with Punjabi five lengths back in third. King admitted that he had not expected the gelding to win but said that Katchit had "amazed him all the way through" his jumping career. Thornton was penalised by the racecourse stewards for using his whip with "excessive frequency" on the winner.

==== 2008–2011: Later career ====
Katchit never recaptured his championship form and failed to win in his last eleven races. In 2008/2009 he ran five times, finishing sixth behind Punjabi in the Champion Hurdle. Alan King later stated that he had "made a mess" of the horse's season by running him under a big weight in a competitive handicap race on his debut. In the following season Katchit was moved up to longer distances and showed some promise when third to Tidal Bay in the Cleeve Hurdle, but in the World Hurdle at the Cheltenham Festival he was beaten more than forty lengths when unplaced behind Big Buck's. On his first start of the 2010/2011 season he finished second at Kempton in October, but sustained a leg injury and was off the course for over a year. In November 2011 he returned to finish a distant third behind Overturn in the Ascot Hurdle before his injury problems returned.

== Death ==
Katchit died at Barbury Castle after unsuccessful surgery for colic in January 2013.

== Pedigree ==
Pedigree of Katchit (IRE), bay gelding, 2003
Sire Kalanisi dk b (Ire)	Doyoun b (Ire)	Mill Reef b	Never Bend dk b
Sire Kalanisi dk b (Ire)	Doyoun b (Ire)	Mill Reef b	Milan Mill b
Sire Kalanisi dk b (Ire)	Doyoun b (Ire)	Dumka b (Fra)	Kashmir b (Ire)
Sire Kalanisi dk b (Ire)	Doyoun b (Ire)	Dumka b (Fra)	Faizebad dk b (Fra)
Sire Kalanisi dk b (Ire)	Kalamba b (Ire)	Green Dancer b	Nijinsky II b
Sire Kalanisi dk b (Ire)	Kalamba b (Ire)	Green Dancer b	Green Valley II dk b
Sire Kalanisi dk b (Ire)	Kalamba b (Ire)	Kareena b (Ire)	Riverman b
Sire Kalanisi dk b (Ire)	Kalamba b (Ire)	Kareena b (Ire)	Kermiya b (Fra)
Dam Miracle gr/ro (GB)	Ezzoud b (Ire)	Last Tycoon dk b (Ire)	Try My Best b
Dam Miracle gr/ro (GB)	Ezzoud b (Ire)	Last Tycoon dk b (Ire)	Mill Princess b (Ire)
Dam Miracle gr/ro (GB)	Ezzoud b (Ire)	Royal Sister II b (Ire)	Claude b (Ity)
Dam Miracle gr/ro (GB)	Ezzoud b (Ire)	Royal Sister II b (Ire)	Ribasha b
Dam Miracle gr/ro (GB)	Madiyla gr (Ire)	Darshaan br (GB)	Shirley Heights b (GB)
Dam Miracle gr/ro (GB)	Madiyla gr (Ire)	Darshaan br (GB)	Delsy b (Fra)
Dam Miracle gr/ro (GB)	Madiyla gr (Ire)	Manntika gr	Kalamoun gr (GB)
Dam Miracle gr/ro (GB)	Madiyla gr (Ire)	Manntika gr	Manushka ch (Fra) (Family: 8-i)
