= Exotic Dancer (horse) =

French-bred Thoroughbred racehorse

- Sire: Turgeon
- Grandsire: Caro
- Dam: Northine
- Damsire: Northern Treat
- Sex: Gelding
- Foaled: 2000
- Died: April 2, 2009
- Country: France
- Colour: Bay
- Breeder: Gaetan Gilles & Ecurie Jules Ouaki
- Owner: Sir Robert Ogden
- Trainer: Jonjo O'Neill
- Record: 27: 8 – 7 – 7
- Earnings: £730,067

Major wins
- Lexus Chase (2008); Totesport Bowl (2007); Cotswold Chase (2007); Paddy Power Gold Cup (2006); Boylesports.com Gold Cup (2006)
- Last updated on December 29, 2008

Exotic Dancer (29 March 2000 – 2 April 2009) was a French-bred National Hunt racehorse, who was trained by Jonjo O'Neill. He had a famous rivalry with Kauto Star but never beat him.

In April 2005, Exotic Dancer finished seventh in the World Hurdle at Cheltenham and as a 50/1 outsider finished third in the Grade 1 Aintree Hurdle at Aintree. In December 2005 he had his first win in a novice chase at Cheltenham.

Exotic Dancer had a successful 2006/07 season with three victories at Cheltenham, in the Paddy Power Gold Cup, Boylesports.com Gold Cup and an 18 length victory in the Letheby and Christopher Chase. However the horse finished second in both King George VI Chase and Cheltenham Gold Cup both times behind Kauto Star. He ended the season with victory at Aintree where he won the Betfair Bowl.

In the 2007/08 season Exotic Dancer ran five times, on each occasion beaten by Kauto Star including the King George VI Chase where Exotic Dancer finished third.

Exotic Dancer began the 2008/09 season with two place finishes before completing a 20 length victory in the Lexus Chase in December 2008, the horse's first win in 20 months.

A contender to win the 2009 John Smith's Grand National, Exotic Dancer was pulled out to concentrate on other races.

Exotic Dancer's final race was the Totesport Bowl at Aintree on Thursday 2 April 2009. He started 3 to 1 as the second favourite and finished second to Madison Du Berlais. Shortly after the race, Exotic Dancer died of a heart attack in his box stall.
