= Finesse Juvenile Hurdle =

Hurdle horse race in Britain

Finesse Juvenile Hurdle
2026
Maestro Conti	One Horse Town	Minella Yoga

Previous years
2023
Comfort Zone	Scriptwriter	Dixon Cove
2022
Pied Piper	Moka De Vassy	Forever William

2020-2011
2020
Galahad Quest	Night Edition	Gerolamo Cardano
2019
Fakir D'Oudairies	Fine Brunello	Adjali
2018
Apple's Shakira	Look My Way	Ulysses
2017
Defi Du Seuil	Rainbow Dreamer	Early Du Lemo
2016
Protek Des Flos	Clan Des Obeaux	Consul De Thaix
2015
Peace And Co	Karezak	Zarib
2014
Le Rocher	Kentucky Hyden	Vicenzo Mio
2013
Rolling Star	Irish Saint	Roc D'apsis
2012
Grumeti	Pearl Swan	Hollow Tree
2011
Local Hero	Third Intention	Indian Daudaie

2010-2001
2010
Baccalaureate	Pistolet Noir	Reaction
2009
Walkon	Reve De Sivola	Simarian
2008
Franchoek	Serabad	Squadron
2007
Katchit	Good Bye Simon	Pauillac
2005
Akilak	Yankeedoodledandy	Salut Saint Cloud
2004
Mondul	Val Du Don	Meryl
2003
Moneytrain	Don Fernando	Saintsaire
2002
Vol Solitaire	Golden Alpha	Mercato
2001
Jair Du Cochet	Pedro Pete	Majlis

2000-1991
2000
Mister Banjo	Estacado	Ibal
1999
Hors La Loi	Behrajan	Noble Demand
1998
Zafarabad	Guilder	Kingdom Emperor
1997
Shooting Light	Noble Lord	Roseberry Avenue
1995
Brave Tornado	Clifton Beat	Romancer
1994
Pridwell	My Ballyboy	Nawar
1993
Major Bugler	Ivor's Flutter	Kadi
1991
Hopscotch	Muse	Master Dancer

1990-1989
1990
Sayyure	Lucky Verdict	Northants
1989
Highland Bud	Enemy Action	Propero

The Finesse Juvenile Hurdle is a Grade 2 National Hunt hurdle race in Great Britain which is open to horses aged four years. It is run on the New Course at Cheltenham over a distance of about 2 miles and 1 furlong (2 miles and 179 yards, or 3,382 metres), and during its running there are eight hurdles to be jumped. The race is for novice hurdlers, and it is scheduled to take place each year in January. The race is currently sponsored by JCB and run under the name of the JCB Triumph Trial Juvenile Hurdle – similar races of the same name also take place at Cheltenham's November and December meetings.

The race was first run in 1985 and winners of the race usually go on to participate in the Triumph Hurdle in March. Since 1989 three horses have achieved victory in both events – Katchit in 2007, Peace And Co in 2015 and Defi Du Seuil in 2017.

== Winners ==
Year	Winner	Jockey	Trainer
1985	Out of The Gloom	Jonjo O'Neill	Peter Easterby
1986	Tangognat	Peter Scudamore	Rod Simpson
1987	Abandoned due to frost
1988	Jason's Quest	Michael Williams	John Baker
1989	Highland Bud	Richard Dunwoody	David Nicholson
1990	Sayyure	Graham McCourt	Nigel Tinkler
1991	Hopscotch	Peter Scudamore	Martin Pipe
1992	Abandoned due to frost
1993	Major Bugler	Adrian Maguire	Toby Balding
1994	Pridwell	Richard Dunwoody	Martin Pipe
1995	Brave Tornado	Tony McCoy	Toby Balding
1996	Abandoned due to frost
1997	Shooting Light	Richard Dunwoody	Pat Murphy
1998	Zafarabad	Richard Johnson	David Nicholson
1999	Hors La Loi III	Thierry Doumen	François Doumen
2000	Mister Banjo	Mick Fitzgerald	Nicky Henderson
2001	Jair du Cochet	Jacques Ricou	Guillaume Macaire
2002	Vol Solitaire	Joe Tizzard	Paul Nicholls
2003	Moneytrain	Robert Thornton	Christian von der Recke
2004	Mondul	Ollie McPhail	Milton Harris
2005	Akilak	Graham Lee	Howard Johnson
2006	Abandoned due to frost
2007	Katchit	Robert Thornton	Alan King
2008	Franchoek	Robert Thornton	Alan King
2009	Walkon	Robert Thornton	Alan King
2010	Baccalaureate	Paddy Brennan	Nigel Twiston-Davies
2011	Local Hero	Tony McCoy	Steve Gollings
2012	Grumeti	Wayne Hutchinson	Alan King
2013	Rolling Star	Barry Geraghty	Nicky Henderson
2014	Le Rocher	Richard Johnson	Nick Williams
2015	Peace And Co	Barry Geraghty	Nicky Henderson
2016	Protek Des Flos	Noel Fehily	Nicky Henderson
2017	Defi Du Seuil	Barry Geraghty	Philip Hobbs
2018	Apple's Shakira	Barry Geraghty	Nicky Henderson
2019	Fakir D'oudairies	JJ Slevin	Joseph O'Brien
2020	Galahad Quest	Harry Cobden	Nick Williams
2021	Abandoned due to waterlogging
2022	Pied Piper	Davy Russell	Gordon Elliott
2023	Comfort Zone	Jonjo O'Neill Jr	Joseph O'Brien
2024	Sir Gino	James Bowen	Nicky Henderson
2025	East India Dock	Sam Twiston-Davies	James Owen
2026	Maestro Conti	Harry Skelton	Dan Skelton

== See also ==
- Horse racing in Great Britain
- List of British National Hunt races
