= National Spirit Hurdle =

Hurdle horse race in Britain

National Spirit Hurdle
2026
| Potters Charm | Brewin'upastorm | Botox Has |

Previous years
2025
Nemean Lion | Steel Ally | Salver
2023
Brewin'upastorm | Sceau Royal | Knappers Hill
2022
Botox Has | Brewin'upastorm | Guard Your Dreams
2021
Brewin'upastorm | Mcfabulous | Molly Ollys Wishes

2020-2011
2020
William Henry | Quel Destin | Thomas Darby
2019
Vision Des Flos | If The Cap Fits | Lil Rockerfeller
2018
Old Guard | Lil Rockerfeller | Air Horse One
2017
Camping Ground | Le Rocher | L'Ami Serge
2016
Lil Rockerfeller | Ubak | San Benedeto
2015
Kilcooley | Silsol | Cannon Fodder
2014
Kayf Moss | Meister Eckhart | Chris Pea Green
2013
Prospect Wells | Meister Eckhart | Dark Lover
2012
Third Intention | Topolski | Duc De Regniere
2011
Celestial Halo | Trenchant | Afsoun

2010-2001
2010
Trenchant | Souffleur | Afsoun
2009
Lough Derg | Pierrot Lunaire | Hills of Aran
2008
Lough Derg | My Way de Solzen | Refinement
2007
United | Refinement | Hereditary
2006
My Way de Solzen | Dancing Bay | Sporazene
2005
Blue Canyon | Copeland | Le Duc
2004
Starzaan | Vic Toto | Big Moment
2003
Classified | Telimar Prince | Comex Flyer
2002
Rouble | Stromness | Jair Du Cochet
2001
Baracouda | Solo Mio | Hulysse Royal

2000-1991
2000
Male-Ana-Mou | Master Beveled | Count Campioni
1999
Lady Cricket | Lord Of Love | Toto Toscato
1998
Shahrur | Darakshan | Serenus
1997
St Ville | Roger's Pal | Raahin
1996
Melnik | Flight Lieutenant | Blazon Of Troy
1993
Flown | Ketti | Highland Bounty
1992
Honest Word | Propero | Major Inquiry
1991
Al Asoof | Beech Road | Sondrio

1990-1988
1990
Vagador | Beech Road | Propero
1989
Beech Road | Vagador | Little Toro
1988
Vagador | High Knowl | Juven Light

The National Spirit Hurdle is a Grade 2 National Hunt hurdle race in Great Britain which is open to horses aged four years or older. It is run at Fontwell Park over a distance of about 2 miles and 3 furlongs (2 miles, 3 furlongs and 33 yards or 3,852 metres), and during its running there are ten hurdles to be jumped. The race is scheduled to take place each year in late February or early March.

The event is named after National Spirit, a dual winner of the Champion Hurdle in the 1940s. National Spirit won five times at Fontwell Park, including three successive victories in the Rank Challenge Cup. The National Spirit Hurdle was established in 1965, and the inaugural running was won by Salmon Spray. During its early years it was also won by Comedy of Errors.

For a period the race was run over 2¼ miles, and it served as a trial for the Champion Hurdle (Beech Road won both events in 1989). It was discontinued in 1994, but its title was revived for a handicap race which took place annually from 1996 to 1998. It was relaunched as a conditions race over 2 miles and 2½ furlongs in 1999, and it was extended to its present length in 2004.

The National Spirit Hurdle is now regarded as a trial for the Stayers' Hurdle. The only horse to have won both races in the same year was My Way de Solzen in 2006. Another horse to have achieved victory in both events, albeit in different seasons, was Baracouda.

== Winners ==
| Year | Winner | Age | Jockey | Trainer |
|---|---|---|---|---|
| 1965 | Salmon Spray | 7 | John Haine | Bob Turnell |
| 1966 | Johns-Wort | 5 | Michael Scudamore | J F Norris |
| 1967 | Sempervivum | 9 | Tommy Jennings | Fulke Walwyn |
| 1968 | Abandoned due to waterlogging |
| 1969 | Privy Seal | 5 | Clive Searle | Frank Cundell |
| 1970 | Coral Diver | 5 | Terry Biddlecombe | Fred Rimell |
| 1971 | Varma | 5 | David Mould | M Masson |
| 1972 | St Patrick's Blue | 7 | David Mould | D Tatlow |
| 1973 | Brantridge Farmer | 5 | Richard Rowell | Auriol Sinclair |
| 1974 | Brantridge Farmer | 6 | Terry Biddlecombe | Fulke Walwyn |
| 1975 | Bladon | 5 | Robert Kington | Fred Winter |
| 1976 | Comedy of Errors | 9 | John Burke | Fred Rimell |
| 1977 | Comedy of Errors | 10 | John Burke | Fred Rimell |
| 1978 | Kybo | 5 | Bob Champion | Josh Gifford |
| 1979 | Bird's Nest | 9 | Andy Turnell | Bob Turnell |
| 1980 | Snowtown Boy | 5 | John Francome | Fred Winter |
| 1981 | Random Leg | 6 | Bob Champion | Josh Gifford |
| 1982 | Mr Moonraker | 5 | Paul Carvill | Miss S Morris |
| 1983 | Abandoned due to frost |
| 1984 | Cut A Dash | 5 | John Francome | Mrs N Smith |
| 1985 | Abandoned due to frost |
| 1986 | Abandoned due to frost |
| 1987 | Corporal Clinger | 8 | Peter Scudamore | Martin Pipe |
| 1988 | Vagador | 5 | Mark Perrett | Guy Harwood |
| 1989 | Beech Road | 7 | Richard Guest | Toby Balding |
| 1990 | Vagador | 7 | Mark Perrett | Guy Harwood |
| 1991 | Al Asoof | 6 | Mark Richards | Peter Hedger |
| 1992 | Honest Word | 7 | Peter Scudamore | Martin Pipe |
| 1993 | Flown | 6 | Richard Dunwoody | Nicky Henderson |
| 1999 | Lady Cricket | 5 | Tony McCoy | Martin Pipe |
| 2000 | Male-Ana-Mou | 7 | Andrew Thornton | Jamie Poulton |
| 2001 | Baracouda | 6 | Thierry Doumen | François Doumen |
| 2002 | Rouble | 6 | Leighton Aspell | Josh Gifford |
| 2003 | Classified | 7 | Tony McCoy | Martin Pipe |
| 2004 | Starzaan | 5 | Timmy Murphy | Hughie Morrison |
| 2005 | Blue Canyon | 7 | Tony McCoy | François Doumen |
| 2006 | My Way de Solzen | 6 | Robert Thornton | Alan King |
| 2007 | United | 6 | Leighton Aspell | Lucy Wadham |
| 2008 | Lough Derg | 8 | Tom Scudamore | David Pipe |
| 2009 | Lough Derg | 9 | Tom Scudamore | David Pipe |
| 2010 | Trenchant | 5 | Robert Thornton | Alan King |
| 2011 | Celestial Halo | 7 | Harry Skelton | Paul Nicholls |
| 2012 | Third Intention | 5 | Joe Tizzard | Colin Tizzard |
| 2013 | Prospect Wells | 8 | Daryl Jacob | Paul Nicholls |
| 2014 | Kayf Moss | 6 | Rhys Flint | John Flint |
| 2015 | Kilcooley | 6 | Noel Fehily | Charlie Longsdon |
| 2016 | Lil Rockerfeller | 5 | Trevor Whelan | Neil King |
| 2017 | Camping Ground | 7 | Joshua Moore | Gary Moore |
| 2018 | Old Guard | 7 | Harry Cobden | Paul Nicholls |
| 2019 | Vision Des Flos | 6 | Tom Scudamore | Colin Tizzard |
| 2020 | William Henry | 10 | Nico de Boinville | Nicky Henderson |
| 2021 | Brewin'upastorm | 8 | Aidan Coleman | Olly Murphy |
| 2022 | Botox Has | 6 | Joshua Moore | Gary Moore |
| 2023 | Brewin'upastorm | 10 | Aidan Coleman | Olly Murphy |
| 2024 | Abandoned due to waterlogging |
| 2025 | Nemean Lion | 8 | Richard Patrick | Kerry Lee |
| 2026 | Potters Charm | 7 | Sam Twiston-Davies | Nigel & Willy Twiston-Davies |

== See also ==
- Horseracing in Great Britain
- List of British National Hunt races
