= November Novices' Chase =

Steeplechase horse race in Britain

November Novices' Chase
2026
Passing Diamond	Workahead	Folie Golith

Previous years
2025
July Flower	Be Aware	Burdett Road
2024
L'eau Du Sud	Western Zephyr	Lookaway
2023
Homme Public	Petit Tonnerre	Mighty Tom
2022
Banbridge	Tommy's Oscar	Sole Pretender
2021
Third Time Lucki	Sebastopol	Mick Pastor

2020-2011
2020
Eldorado Allen	Quel Destin	Le Patriote
2019
Put The Kettle On	Al Dancer	Getaway Trump
2018
Lalor	Dynamite Dollars	Claimantakinforgan
2017
North Hill Harvey	River Wylde	Ozzie The Oscar
2016
Le Prezien	Hammersly Lake	Three Stars
2015
Garde La Victoire	Fox Norton	Calipto
2014
Dunraven Storm	Vibrato Valtat	Little Jon
2013
Dodging Bullets	Raya Star	Ted Veale
2012
Captain Conan	Sire De Grugy	Third Intention
2011
Al Ferof	Astracad	Maggio

2010-2001
2010
Ghizao	Captain Chris	Loosen My Load
2009
Tataniano	Pigeon Island	Five Dream
2008
Tatenen	Straw Bear	Crescent Island
2007
Moon Over Miami	Predateur	Dev
2006
Fair Along	Natal	Penzance
2005
Accordion Etoile	Tamarinbleu	Albuhera
2004
Fundamentalist	Contraband	My Will
2003
Thisthatandtother	Ryders Storm	Atum Re
2002
Azertyuiop	Golden Alpha	Stars Out Tonight
2001
Seebald	Armaturk	Sandy Duff

2000-1991
2000
Best Mate	Fatehalkhair	Dusk Duel
1999
Fadalko	Toto Toscato	Donadino
1998
Mister Morose	Dines	Desert Mountain
1997
Queen Of Spades	Direct Route	Ashwell Boy
1996
Celibate	Land Afar	Hedgehopper
1995
Captain Khedive	Cable Beach	Cumbrian Challenge
1994
Martin's Lamp	Absalom's Lady	Merlins Wish
1993
Baydon Star	Ghia Gneuiagh	Country Lad
1992
Egypt Mill Prince	Belstone Fox	Golden Fare
1991
Deadly Charm	Stay Awake	Montalino

1990-1988
1990
Black Amber	Montalino	Pinemartin
1989
Another Coral	Campsea-Ash	Father Paddy
1988
Southernair	Fred The Tread	Only two ran
1987
Jim Thorpe	Majestic Buck	Neblin

The November Novices' Chase, currently known as the Paddy Power Arkle Challenge Trophy Trial Novices' Chase, is a Grade 2 National Hunt chase in Great Britain which is open to horses aged four years or older. It is run on the Old Course at Cheltenham over a distance of about 2 miles (1 mile 7 furlongs and 199 yards, or 3,199 metres), and during its running there are twelve fences to be jumped. The race is for novice chasers, and it is scheduled to take place each year in November.

The event was formerly known as the Coventry Novices' Chase, and for a period it was classed at Listed level. It was given the title of the November Novices' Chase and promoted to Grade 2 status in 1994. The race was sponsored by The Independent from 2000 to 2011 before the Racing Post took over sponsorship in 2012 and renamed it the Arkle Trophy Trial Novices' Chase. Paddy Power began sponsoring the race in 2022.

== Winners ==
Year	Winner	Age	Jockey	Trainer
1974	Highland Abbe	8	A Andrews	Les Kennard
1975	Mister Fantasy	6	Mr George Sloan	Josh Gifford
1976	No race (Note: No racing took place at Cheltenham during the 1976/77 National Hunt season until 31st December, as the course was unfit for racing due to the effects of drought in the UK.)
1977	Pavement Artist	5	Steve Smith Eccles	Harry Thomson Jones
1978	Carrigeen Hill	7	Jeff King	Verley Bewicke
1979	Drusus	5	Colin Tinkler	Fred Rimell
1980	Snowtown Boy	5	John Francome	Fred Winter
1981	Spinning Saint	7	Mr Norman Babbage	Mrs N Babbage
1982	Secret Ballot	8	Steve Knight	Andy Turnell
1983	Noddy's Ryde	6	Neale Doughty	Gordon W. Richards
1984	Freight Forwarder	10	John Francome	Arthur Pitt
1985	Music Be Magic	6	Phil Tuck	Gordon W. Richards
1986	Olympic Prize	7	Peter Hobbs	Josh Gifford
1987	Jim Thorpe	6	Phil Tuck	Gordon W. Richards
1988	Southernair	8	Steve Smith Eccles	John Jenkins
1989	Another Coral	6	Richard Dunwoody	David Nicholson
1990	Black Amber	6	Richard Dunwoody	Nicky Henderson
1991	Deadly Charm	5	Richard Dunwoody	David Nicholson
1992	Egypt Mill Prince	6	Mark Pitman	Jenny Pitman
1993	Baydon Star	6	Adrian Maguire	David Nicholson
1994	Martin's Lamp	7	Adrian Maguire	David Nicholson
1995	Captain Khedive	7	Tony McCoy	Paul Nicholls
1996	Celibate	5	Richard Dunwoody	Charlie Mann
1997	Queen of Spades	7	Carl Llewellyn	Nigel Twiston-Davies
1998	Mister Morose	8	Carl Llewellyn	Nigel Twiston-Davies
1999	Fadalko	6	Joe Tizzard	Paul Nicholls
2000	Best Mate	5	Jim Culloty	Henrietta Knight
2001	Seebald	6	Tony McCoy	Martin Pipe
2002	Azertyuiop	5	Ruby Walsh	Paul Nicholls
2003	Thisthatandtother	7	Ruby Walsh	Paul Nicholls
2004	Fundamentalist	6	Carl Llewellyn	Nigel Twiston-Davies
2005	Accordion Etoile	6	John Cullen	Paul Nolan
2006	Fair Along	4	Richard Johnson	Philip Hobbs
2007	Moon Over Miami	6	Noel Fehily	Charlie Mann
2008	Tatenen	4	Sam Thomas	Paul Nicholls
2009	Tataniano	5	Ruby Walsh	Paul Nicholls
2010	Ghizao	6	Timmy Murphy	Paul Nicholls
2011	Al Ferof	6	Ruby Walsh	Paul Nicholls
2012	Captain Conan	5	Barry Geraghty	Nicky Henderson
2013	Dodging Bullets	5	Daryl Jacob	Paul Nicholls
2014	Dunraven Storm	9	Richard Johnson	Philip Hobbs
2015	Garde La Victoire	6	Richard Johnson	Philip Hobbs
2016	Le Prezien	5	Barry Geraghty	Paul Nicholls
2017	North Hill Harvey	6	Harry Skelton	Dan Skelton
2018	Lalor	6	Richard Johnson	Kayley Woollacott
2019	Put The Kettle On	5	Aidan Coleman	Henry de Bromhead
2020	Eldorado Allen	6	Robbie Power	Colin Tizzard
2021	Third Time Lucki	6	Harry Skelton	Dan Skelton
2022	Banbridge	6	JJ Slevin	Joseph O'Brien
2023	Homme Public	6	Henry Brooke	Oliver Greenall & Josh Guerriero
2024	L'Eau Du Sud	6	Harry Skelton	Dan Skelton
2025	July Flower	6	Darragh O'Keeffe	Henry de Bromhead
2026	Passing Diamond	6	Richie McLernon	Ben Haslam

== See also ==
- Horse racing in Great Britain
- List of British National Hunt races
