= Dipper Novices' Chase =

Steeplechase horse race in Britain

Dipper Novices' Chase
2023
The Real Whacker	Monmiral	Thunder Rock

Previous years
2022
L'Homme Presse	The Glancing Queen	Fantastikas
2021
Messire Des Obeaux	Protektorat	Lieutenant Rocco

2020-2011
2020
Midnight Shadow	Paint The Dream	Deyrann de Carjac
2019
Lostintranslation	Defi Du Seuil	Black Op
2018
Yanworth	Sizing Tennessee	Willoughby Court
2017
Whisper	Clan Des Obeaux	Briery Belle
2016
Seeyouatmidnight	Blaklion	Le Mercurey
2015
Ptit Zig	Champagne West	Top Totti
2014
Oscar Whisky	Taquin Du Seuil	Close House
2012
Champion Court	Solix	Invictus
2011
Hell's Bay	Medermit	Reve De Sivola

2010-2001
2010
Seven Is My Number	Pigeon Island	Only two ran
2009
Calgary Bay	Kicks For Free	Tartak
2008
Lead On	Predateur	Papini
2007
My Way de Solzen	Turko	Dalriath
2006
The Listener	Napolitain	Star De Mohaison
2005
My Will	El Vaquero	Only two finished
2002
Barton	Errand Boy	Shining Tyne
2001
Red Striker	Gregorio	A Piece Of Cake

2000-1991
2000
Donnybrook	Robbo	Only two finished
1999
Bobby Grant	Course Doctor	No Retreat
1998
Celestial Choir	Jymjam Johnny	True Scot
1996
Avro Anson	Lord Gyllene	Cumbrian Challenge
1995
Morceli	Northern Squire	Toogood To Be True
1993
Dawson City	Greek Flutter	Shuil Saor
1992
Gale Again	Leigh Boy	On The Hooch
1991
Meritmoore	Intarsia	Only two finished

1990-1987
1989
Blazing Walker	Third In Line	Mister Point
1988
Cool Strike	Nos Na Gaoithe	The Demon Barber
1987
Jim Thorpe	Saizano	Botham

The Dipper Novices' Chase was a Grade 2 National Hunt chase in Great Britain which was run annually from 1980 until 2023. In April of the latter year, the British Horseracing Authority announced the removal of the Dipper from the programme from the 2023/24 season onwards.

The race was open to novice chasers aged five years or older.

Before 2005 the event was usually run at Newcastle in mid January. Its distance at this venue was 2 miles and 4 furlongs (4,023 metres), and there were sixteen fences to jump. Prior to the 1990–91 season it took place in November.

After 2005, it was scheduled to take place each year on New Year's Day on the New Course at Cheltenham over a distance of about 2 miles and 4½ furlongs (2 miles 4 furlongs and 127 yards or 4,175 metres), and during its running there were seventeen fences to be jumped.

== Winners ==
Year	Winner	Age	Jockey	Trainer
1980	Little Owl	6	Jonjo O'Neill	Peter Easterby
1981	Abandoned because of frost
1982	Rosewell Riever	9	Donal Nolan	Peter Monteith
1983	Lettoch	6	Graham Bradley	Michael Dickinson
1984	Jimbrook	7	Alan Brown	Peter Easterby
1985	Abandoned because of snow
1986	Joint Sovereignty	6	Mark Dwyer	Jimmy FitzGerald
1987	Jim Thorpe	6	Phil Tuck	Gordon W. Richards
1988	Cool Strike	7	Brian Storey	George M. Moore
1989	Blazing Walker	5	Chris Grant	Arthur Stephenson
1991	Meritmoore	8	Jason Callaghan	George M. Moore
1992	Gale Again	5	Chris Grant	Arthur Stephenson
1993	Dawson City	6	Lorcan Wyer	Peter Easterby
1994	Abandoned due to waterlogged state of course
1995	Morceli	7	Neale Doughty	Howard Johnson
1996	Avro Anson	8	Peter Niven	Maurice Camacho
1997	Abandoned due to frost
1998	Celestial Choir	8	Brian Storey	Les Eyre
1999	Bobby Grant	8	Robbie Supple	Chris Grant
2000	Donnybrook	7	Brian Harding	Bob Woodhouse
2001	Red Striker	7	Richard Guest	Norman Mason
2002	Barton	9	Tony Dobbin	Tim Easterby
	no race 2003–04 (Note: The race was abandoned twice in 2003 – firstly at Newcastle (waterlogging), and then at Haydock Park (frost)) (Note: The 2004 running at Newcastle was cancelled because of frost)
2005	My Will	5	Ruby Walsh	Paul Nicholls
2006	The Listener	7	Andrew Thornton	Robert Alner
2007	My Way de Solzen	7	Robert Thornton	Alan King
2008	Lead On	7	Richard Johnson	Philip Hobbs
2009	Calgary Bay	6	Tony McCoy	Henrietta Knight
2010	Seven Is My Number	8	Timmy Murphy	David Pipe
2011	Hell's Bay	9	Joe Tizzard	Colin Tizzard
2012	Champion Court	7	Alain Cawley	Martin Keighley
	no race 2013 (Note: The 2013 running was abandoned because of waterlogging)
2014	Oscar Whisky	9	Barry Geraghty	Nicky Henderson
2015	Ptit Zig	6	Sam Twiston-Davies	Paul Nicholls
2016	Seeyouatmidnight	8	Brian Hughes	Sandy Thomson
2017	Whisper	9	Davy Russell	Nicky Henderson
2018	Yanworth	8	Barry Geraghty	Alan King
2019	Lostintranslation	7	Robbie Power	Colin Tizzard
2020	Midnight Shadow	7	Danny Cook	Sue Smith
2021	Messire Des Obeaux (Note: The 2021 race took place at Wincanton after the original Cheltenham fixture was abandoned due to waterlogging)	9	Daryl Jacob	Alan King
2022	L'Homme Presse	7	Charlie Deutsch	Venetia Williams
2023	The Real Whacker	7	Sam Twiston-Davies	Patrick Neville

== See also ==
- Horse racing in Great Britain
- List of British National Hunt races

== Sources ==
- Racing Post:
  - 1987, 1988, 1989, 1991, 1992, 1993, 1995, 1996, 1998, 1999
  - 2000, 2001, 2002, 2005, 2006, 2007, 2008, 2009, 2010, 2011
  - 2012, 2014, 2015, 2016, 2017, 2018, 2019, 2020, 2021, 2022
  - 2023
- pedigreequery.com – Dipper Novices' Chase – Cheltenham.
- bbc.co.uk – Haydock racing abandoned (4 January 2003).
- telegraph.co.uk – Weather forecast unfavourable (2 January 2004).
