= December Gold Cup =

Steeplechase horse race in Britain

- Class: Premier Handicap
- Location: Cheltenham Racecourse; Cheltenham, England
- Inaugurated: 1963
- Race type: Steeplechase
- Website: Cheltenham

Race information
- Distance: 2m 4f 127y (4,139 metres)
- Surface: Turf
- Track: Left-handed
- Qualification: Four-years-old and up
- Weight: Handicap
- Purse: £125,000 (2025); 1st: £71,188

December Gold Cup
2025
Glengouly	Vincenzo	Jagwar

Previous years
2024
Gemirande	Madara	Fugitif
2023
Fugitif	Il Ridoto	Frero Banbou
2021
Coole Cody	Zanza	Midnight Shadow
2020
Chatham Street Lad	Midnight Shadow	Benatar
2019
Warthog	Spiritofthegames	Robin Des Foret
2018
Frodon	Cepage	Guitar Pete
2017
Guitar Pete	Clan Des Obeaux	King's Odyssey
2016
Frodon	Aso	Village Vic
2015
Village Vic	Champagne West	Tenor Nivernais
2014
Niceonefrankie	Barrakilla	Edgardo Sol
2013
Double Ross	Cantlow	Colour Squadron
2012
Unioniste	Walkon	Golden Chieftain
2011
Quantitativeeasing	Medermit	Roudoudou Ville

2010-2001
2010
Poquelin	Great Endeavour	Sunnyhillboy
2009
Poquelin	Razor Royale	Skippers Brig
2007
Tamarinbleu	Le Volfoni	Patman Du Charmil
2006
Exotic Dancer	Knowhere	Taranis
2005
Sir Oj	Le Passing	Lacdoudal
2004
Monkerhostin	Thisthatandtother	Europa
2003
Iris Royal	Risk Accessor	Telemoss
2002
Fondmort	Foly Pleasant	Youlneverwalkalone

2000-1991
2000
Go Roger Go	Robbo	Connor Macleod
1999
Legal Right	Nordance Prince	Irbee
1998
Northern Starlight	Simply Dashing	Mr Strong Gale
1997
Senor El Betrutti	Challenger du Luc	Bells Life
1996
Addington Boy	Go Universal	Northern Hide
1994
Dublin Flyer	Nuaffe	Southolt
1993
Fragrant Dawn	Young Hustler	Freeline Finishing
1992
Another Coral	Second Schedual	Tipping Tim
1991
Kings Fountain	Another Coral	Ida's Delight

1990-1987
1989
Clever Folly	Welsh Oak	Barnbrook Again
1988
Pegwell Bay	Beau Ranger	Oregon Trail
1987
Bishops Yarn	Music Be Magic	Raise An Argument

The December Gold Cup (run since 2024 as the Nyetimber December Gold Cup) is a Premier Handicap National Hunt steeplechase in Great Britain which is open to horses aged four years or older. It is run on the New Course at Cheltenham over a distance of about 2 miles and 4½ furlongs (2 miles 4 furlongs and 127 yards, or 4,139 metres), and during its running there are seventeen fences to be jumped. It is a handicap race, and it is scheduled to take place each year in December.

The event was first run in 1963. It was originally sponsored by Massey Ferguson and known as the Massey Ferguson Gold Cup. The race continued with this title until 1980, but since then it has had various sponsors and consequently several title changes. The 2005 running was named the Robin Cook Memorial Gold Cup. This was in memory of Robin Cook (1946–2005), a former Foreign Secretary who was a keen racing enthusiast. Boylesports supported the race from 2006 to 2009 as the Boylesports.com Gold Cup. The 2010 race was run as the Vote A P Gold Cup as part of a successful campaign to encourage racegoers to vote for Tony McCoy in the BBC Sports Personality of the Year award. In 2011 the racehorse owner Andy Stewart began backing the race to promote the Spinal Research charity, following a spinal injury suffered by his son Paul in 2008. The race was run as the Spinal Research The Atlantic 4 Gold Cup in 2011, the Paul Stewart IronSpine Charity Challenge Gold Cup in 2012 and was then named the Stewart Family Thank You Gold Cup in 2013. From 2014 to 2020 it was run as the Caspian Caviar Gold Cup and in 2021 it was titled the Racing Post Gold Cup. The race has become commonly known in the racing media as the December Gold Cup. and in 2022 Ais took over sponsorship and the word December appeared in the official race title. Nyetimber have sponsored the race since 2023. The race was give Grade 3 status when the National Hunt Pattern was revised in 1989 and was re-classified as a Premier Handicap from the 2022 running when Grade 3 status was renamed by the BHA.

The race is often contested by horses which ran previously in the Paddy Power Gold Cup (also formerly known by other titles). Three have won both races in the same season – Pegwell Bay, Senor El Betrutti and Exotic Dancer.

== Records ==
Most successful horse (2 wins) :

- Poquelin – (2009),(2010)
- Frodon - (2016, 2018)

Leading jockey (3 wins):

- Richard Johnson – Legal Right (1999), Monkerhostin (2004) Village Vic (2015)

Leading trainer (5 wins):

- Paul Nicholls – Poquelin (2009, 2010), Unioniste (2012), Frodon (2016, 2018)

== Winners ==
- Weights given in stones and pounds.

Year	Winner	Age	Weight	Jockey	Trainer
1963	Limeking	6	10–12	Toss Taaffe	Danny Morgan
1964	Flying Wild	8	10-06	Tommy Carberry	Dan Moore
1965	Flyingbolt	6	12-06	Pat Taaffe	Tom Dreaper
1966	The Laird	5	10-09	Jeff King	Bob Turnell
1967	Abandoned due to foot-and-mouth restrictions
1968	Tassilo	10	10-01	Aly Branford	Fulke Walwyn
1969	Titus Oates	7	11–13	Ron Barry	Gordon W. Richards
1970	Simian	8	11-08	David Moore	Auriol Sinclair
1971	Leap Frog	7	12-01	Val O'Brien	Tom Dreaper
1972	Arctic Bow	7	10–12	Andrew Turnell	Bob Turnell
1973	Pendil	8	12-07	Richard Pitman	Fred Winter
1974	Garnishee	10	10-06	David Mould	Harry Thomson Jones
1975	Easby Abbey	8	11-10	Ron Barry	Peter Easterby
1976	Abandoned due to frost
1977	Even Melody	8	11-02	Colin Hawkins	Neville Crump
1978	The Snipe	8	10-00	Anthony Webber	John Webber
1979	Father Delaney	7	10–10	Alan Brown	Peter Easterby
1980	Bueche Giorod	9	10-00	Bryan Smart	Jenny Pitman
1981	Abandoned due to snow
1982	Observe	6	10–11	John Francome	Fred Winter
1983	Fifty Dollars More	8	11-10	Richard Linley	Fred Winter
1984	Beau Ranger	6	09-10	John Hurst	John Thorne
1985	Combs Ditch	9	11-09	Colin Brown	David Elsworth
1986	Oregon Trail	6	10-07	Ronnie Beggan	Simon Christian
1987	Bishops Yarn	8	10-07	Richard Guest	Toby Balding
1988	Pegwell Bay	7	10–13	Brendan Powell	Tim Forster
1989	Clever Folly	9	10-04	Neale Doughty	Gordon W. Richards
1990	Abandoned due to snow
1991	Kings Fountain	8	11–10	Anthony Tory	Kim Bailey
1992	Another Coral	9	11-04	Richard Dunwoody	David Nicholson
1993	Fragrant Dawn	9	10-02	Declan Murphy	Martin Pipe
1994	Dublin Flyer	8	10-02	Brendan Powell	Tim Forster
1995	Abandoned due to frost
1996	Addington Boy	8	11–10	Tony Dobbin	Gordon W. Richards
1997	Senor El Betrutti	8	11-03	Graham Bradley	Susan Nock
1998	Northern Starlight	7	10-01	Tony McCoy	Martin Pipe
1999	Legal Right	6	10–13	Richard Johnson	Jonjo O'Neill
2000	Go Roger Go	8	11-00	Norman Williamson	Edward O'Grady
2001	Abandoned due to frost
2002	Fondmort	6	10-05	Mick Fitzgerald	Nicky Henderson
2003 (Note: The 2003 edition was run on Cheltenham's Old Course over 2 miles and 4½ furlongs)	Iris Royal	7	10–13	Mick Fitzgerald	Nicky Henderson
2004	Monkerhostin	7	10-02	Richard Johnson	Philip Hobbs
2005	Sir Oj	8	10-00	Paul Carberry	Noel Meade
2006	Exotic Dancer	6	11-04	Tony Dobbin	Jonjo O'Neill
2007	Tamarinbleu	7	11-08	Denis O'Regan	David Pipe
2008	Abandoned due to waterlogging
2009	Poquelin	6	11-08	Ruby Walsh	Paul Nicholls
2010	Poquelin	7	11-07	Ian Popham	Paul Nicholls
2011	Quantitativeeasing	6	10-07	Barry Geraghty	Nicky Henderson
2012	Unioniste	4	10-00	Harry Derham	Paul Nicholls
2013	Double Ross	7	10-08	Sam Twiston-Davies	Nigel Twiston-Davies
2014	Niceonefrankie	8	11-05	Aidan Coleman	Venetia Williams
2015	Village Vic	8	10-00	Richard Johnson	Philip Hobbs
2016	Frodon	4	10-10	Sam Twiston-Davies	Paul Nicholls
2017	Guitar Pete	7	10-02	Ryan Day	Nicky Richards
2018	Frodon	6	11-12	Bryony Frost	Paul Nicholls
2019	Warthog	7	10-03	David Noonan	David Pipe
2020	Chatham Street Lad	8	10-10	Darragh O'Keeffe	Michael Winters
2021	Coole Cody	10	10-12	Adam Wedge	Evan Williams
2022	Abandoned due to frost
2023	Fugitif	8	11-03	Gavin Sheehan	Richard Hobson
2024	Gemirande	8	10-02	Charlie Deutsch	Venetia Williams
2025	Glengouly	9	10-02	Sean Bowen	Faye Bramley

== See also ==
- Horse racing in Great Britain
- List of British National Hunt races
