= My Way de Solzen =

French racehorse

My Way De Solzen
- Sire: Assessor
- Dam: Agathe De Solzen
- Damsire: Chamberlin
- Sex: Gelding
- Foaled: 2000
- Country: France
- Colour: Bay
- Breeder: Catherine Ricous-Guerin & Jacques Guerin
- Owner: B Winfield, A Longman, J Wright & C Fenton
- Trainer: Alan King
- Record: 24: 10-7-0
- Earnings: £433,651

Major wins
- World Hurdle (2006); Arkle Challenge Trophy (2007); Long Walk Hurdle (2005); National Spirit Hurdle (2006); Dipper Novices' Chase (2007)
- Last updated on December 5, 2008

My Way De Solzen (foaled 2000) was a French-bred National Hunt racehorse, who began his racing career trained in France by A. Lamotte D'Argy.

== Racing career ==
=== 2004/5 ===
He made his first start in 2 mile 1 furling chase at Dieppe, where he was pulled up. After his second race, he was sold to new connections and sent to England to be trained by Alan King.

He made his British debut on November 15, 2004 at Leicester, where he won a 2-mile Class D Novices hurdle under jockey, Robert Thornton. After winning his second race a month on at Bangor, My Way De Solzen was stepped up in class, where he contested the Grade 1 Tolworth Hurdle at Sandown, finishing fifth. In his debut season in Britain (2004-2005), he went on to contest top Novice Hurdle races at both the Cheltenham and Aintree Festivals, where he finished a distant 15th in the Supreme Novices' Hurdle and a 6-length 2nd in the Mersey Novices Hurdle, respectively.

=== 2005/6 ===
It was the following season (2005-2006), where My Way De Solzen began to shine. He began the season finishing 2nd to St. Matthew in a Handicap Hurdle at Haydock in November. Then, when stepped up to 3 miles for he first time, he ran out a 5-length winner of the Long Walk Hurdle at Chepstow in December 2005. In his prep run for the Cheltenham Festival, he came home a comfortable 9-length winner of the National Spirit Hurdle at Fontwell. He then went on to contest the 2006 World Hurdle at Cheltenham, where he was sent off a 9/2 chance. He stayed on strongly up the hill to deny the Mick Halford trained Golden Cross by a head, and in the process secured his first victory at the Cheltenham Festival. In his final appearance of the season, he finished a 7 length second to Mighty Man in the Liverpool Hurdle at Aintree.

=== 2006/7 ===
My Way De Solzen reappeared in the 2006-2007 season in the Grade 2 John Smith's Hurdle at Wetherby in October. He was sent off a 4/9 chance, but could only finish second when trying to give 8 pounds in weight to the winner, Redemption. His trainer, Alan King, then decided to embark on a novice chasing campaign that season, and My Way De Solzen began with a 14 length victory in a Lingfield Beginners Chase. He was stepped straight up in class, where he contested the Grade 2 Henry VIII Novices Chase at Sandown, where he was sent off an odds on 4/7 chance, but could only finish second to Fair Along. He, however regained the winning thread in his next two races, winning Grade 2 Beginner's Chases at Cheltenham and Haydock respectively. Following this, he was sent off the 7/2 2nd favourite for the Arkle Challenge Trophy at Cheltenham, where he was a most impressive 5 length winner under jockey, Robert Thornton. After a long season, Alan King put his gelding away for the season and began to prepare him for the 2007-2008 season.

=== 2007/8 ===
He began the 2007-2008 season, with connections dreaming of the Cheltenham Gold Cup and started off in the 2007 Betfair Chase, where he was unable to trouble the odds on favourite Kauto Star and eventually finished 5th. Connections, however, were not too disheartened and were sure their gelding would come on for the run when he contested the Grade 1 King George VI Chase at Cheltenham. He was sent off 13/2 3rd favourite behind odds on favourite Kauto Star and Exotic Dancer. But he never managed to get into the race and was eventually pulled up. Alan King then reverted him back to hurdles for the remainder of the season, but My Way De Solzen was still unable to regain the winning thread, finishing 2nd in the National Spirit Hurdle, and 5th and 6th respectively in the World Hurdle at Cheltenham in March and the Aintree Hurdle in April.
