= Prestbury Juvenile Hurdle =

Hurdle horse race in Britain

Prestbury Juvenile Hurdle (JCB Triumph Trial Juvenile Hurdle)
- Class: Grade 2
- Location: Cheltenham Racecourse; Cheltenham, England
- Race type: Hurdle race
- Sponsor: JCB
- Website: Cheltenham Racecourse

Race information
- Distance: 2m 87y (3,298 metres)
- Surface: Turf
- Track: Left-handed
- Qualification: Three-years-old
- Weight: 11 st 0 lb Allowances; 7 lb for fillies and mares Penalties; 5 lb for winners of a Class 1 wfa hurdle 3 lb for winners of a Class 2 wfa or Class 1 handicap hurdle
- Purse: £80,000 (2025); First: £47,552

JCB Triumph Hurdle Trial
2026
| Atomic City | Charles Darnay | Don Dandy |

Previous years
2023
Burdett Road | An Bradan Feasa | Milan Tino
2022
Scriptwriter | Perseus Way | War Correspondent
2021
Knight Salute | Saint Riquier | Yorksea

2020-2011
2020
Duffle Coat | Adagio | Balko Saint
2019
Allmankind | Botox Has | Repetitio
2018
Quel Destin | Cracker Factory | Never Adapt
2017
Apple's Shakira | Gumball | Eragon De Chanay
2016
Defi Du Seuil | Diable De Sivola | Lambeau Field
2015
Wolf of Windlesham | Coo Star Sivola | Romain De Senam
2014
Golden Doyen | Hargam | Baraka De Thaix
2013
Royal Irish Hussar | Guitar Pete | Azza
2012
Far West | Vasco Du Ronceray | Roc D'apsis
2011
Hinterland | Hollow Tree | Secret Edge

2010-2001
2010
Sam Winner | Grandouet | Plan A
2009
Pistolet Noir | Barizan | Olofi
2008
Simarian | R De Rien Sivola | Reve De Sivola
2007
Franchoek | Won in the Dark | Lemon Silk
2006
Katchit | Freeze The Flame | Cheveley Flyer
2005
Fair Along | Afsoun | Kasbah Bliss
2004
Cerium | Phar Bleu | Fire Dragon
2003
Al Eile | Web Perceptions | Barneys Lyric
2002
Don Fernando | Le Duc | Silver Charmer
2001
Greenhope | Picture Palace | Arellano

2000-1991
2000
Montreal | Kadarann | Sunday Rain
1999
High Stakes | Mixsterthetrixster | Calico Lady
1998
Katarino | Simply Gifted | Charlie's Gold
1997
The French Furze | Keeping The Faith | Kilbride Lad
1996
Noble Lord | Always Happy | Ben Bowden
1995
Chicodari | Talk Back | Shining Edge
1993
Spring Marathon | Wings Cove | Love You Madly
1992
Mohana | Clurican | Be My Habitat
1991
Montebel | Sir Dancelot | Pharly Story

1990-1987
1990
Hopscotch | Bookcase | Mariner's Mirror
1989
Major Inquiry | Coe | Tring Park
1988
Liadett | Great Saling | Arctic Baron
1987
Daffodil | South Parade | Record Flight

The Prestbury Juvenile Hurdle is a Grade 2 National Hunt hurdle race in Great Britain which is open to three-year-old horses. It is run on the Old Course at Cheltenham over a distance of approximately 2 miles and a furlong (2 miles and 87 yards, or 3,298 metres), and during its running there are eight hurdles to be jumped. The race is for novice hurdlers, and it is scheduled to take place each year in November.

Originally known as the "Rosehill Hurdle", the event was given Grade 2 status in 2004. It is currently sponsored by JCB and is run under the name of the JCB Triumph Trial Juvenile Hurdle.

== Winners ==
| Year | Winner | Jockey | Trainer |
|---|---|---|---|
| 1972 | Bridge Of Sighs | Jeff King | Verley Bewicke |
| 1973 | Young Robert | Jimmy Uttley | Peter Ashworth |
| 1974 | Destiny Hill | John Burke | Fred Rimell |
| 1975 | Military Debt | Eddie Wright | Les Kennard |
| 1976 | No race (Note: No racing took place at Cheltenham during the 1976/77 National Hunt season until 31st December, as the course was unfit for racing due to the effects of drought in the UK.) |
| 1977 | Roi-Des-Toits | Alan Flint | E Collingwood |
| 1978 | Landa's Friend | Kevin Gray | Peter Ashworth |
| 1979 | Palace Dan | Colin Tinkler | Fred Rimell |
| 1980 | Davidgalaxy Affair | Billy Morris | Frank Yardley |
| 1981 | Sandalay | Tommy Carmody | Pat Rohan |
| 1982 | The Grey Bomber | Chris Grant | Denys Smith |
| 1983 | Santella King | Mr Dermot Browne | Michael Dickinson |
| 1984 | Barnbrook Again | John Francome | Stan Mellor |
| 1985 | Saffron Lord | Brendan Powell | Les Kennard |
| 1986 | Melendez | Peter Scudamore | Martin Pipe |
| 1987 | Daffodil | Ron Hyett | Sally Oliver |
| 1988 | Liadett | Peter Scudamore | Martin Pipe |
| 1989 | Major Inquiry | Graham Bradley | David Elsworth |
| 1990 | Hopscotch | Mark Perrett | Martin Pipe |
| 1991 | Montebel | Eamon Murphy | Nigel Twiston-Davies |
| 1992 | Mohana | Peter Scudamore | Martin Pipe |
| 1993 | Spring Marathon | Paul Holley | Nerys Dutfield |
| 1994 | No race |
| 1995 | Chicodari | Adrian Maguire | David Nicholson |
| 1996 | Noble Lord | Brendan Powell | Bob Buckler |
| 1997 | The French Furze | Tony McCoy | Martin Pipe |
| 1998 | Katarino | Mick Fitzgerald | Nicky Henderson |
| 1999 | High Stakes | Norman Williamson | Christy Roche |
| 2000 | Montreal | Tony McCoy | Martin Pipe |
| 2001 | Greenhope | Mick Fitzgerald | Nicky Henderson |
| 2002 | Don Fernando | Tony McCoy | Martin Pipe |
| 2003 | Al Eile | Jim Culloty | John Queally |
| 2004 | Cerium | Ruby Walsh | Paul Nicholls |
| 2005 | Fair Along | Richard Johnson | Philip Hobbs |
| 2006 | Katchit | Robert Thornton | Alan King |
| 2007 | Franchoek | Robert Thornton | Alan King |
| 2008 | Simarian | Donal Fahy | Evan Williams |
| 2009 | Pistolet Noir | Daryl Jacob | Nick Williams |
| 2010 | Sam Winner | Noel Fehily | Paul Nicholls |
| 2011 | Hinterland | Ruby Walsh | Paul Nicholls |
| 2012 | Far West | Ruby Walsh | Paul Nicholls |
| 2013 | Royal Irish Hussar | Barry Geraghty | Nicky Henderson |
| 2014 | Golden Doyen | Richard Johnson | Philip Hobbs |
| 2015 | Wolf of Windlesham | Joshua Moore | Stuart Edmunds |
| 2016 | Defi Du Seuil | Barry Geraghty | Philip Hobbs |
| 2017 | Apple's Shakira | Barry Geraghty | Nicky Henderson |
| 2018 | Quel Destin | Harry Cobden | Paul Nicholls |
| 2019 | Allmankind | Harry Skelton | Dan Skelton |
| 2020 | Duffle Coat | Robbie Power | Gordon Elliott |
| 2021 | Knight Salute | Paddy Brennan | Milton Harris |
| 2022 | Scriptwriter | Paddy Brennan | Milton Harris |
| 2023 | Burdett Road | Harry Cobden | James Owen |
| 2024 | East India Dock | Sam Twiston-Davies | James Owen |
| 2025 | One Horse Town | Paul O'Brien | Harry Derham |
| 2026 | Atomic City | JJ Slevin | Joseph O'Brien |

== See also ==
- Horse racing in Great Britain
- List of British National Hunt races
