= Ron Barry =

Irish jump jockey

Ron Barry was an Irish professional jump jockey from Limerick. He had a career spanning 1960 to 1980s, mainly riding in Great Britain.

He won the Whitbread Gold Cup three times in 1971, 1973, and 1974. In 1969, he won the Scottish Grand National, the Massey Ferguson Gold Cup, and the Mackeson Gold Cup. He set a record of 125 race wins, was British jump racing Champion Jockey in the 1973 and 1974 seasons, and was stable jockey to Gordon W. Richards.
