= Declan Murphy (jockey) =

Irish former jockey (born 1966)

Personal information
- Nationality: Irish
- Born: 5 March 1966 (age 60) County Limerick, Ireland
- Occupation: Jockey

Horse racing career
- Sport: Horse racing

Honors
- 1993 Queen Mother Champion Chase (Deep Sensation), 1993 Mackeson Gold Cup (Bradbury Star), Bula Hurdle, Tripleprint Gold Cup

Significant horses
- Deep Sensation, Bradbury Star, Arcot

Declan Murphy (born 5 March 1966) is an Irish former jockey known for his return to his career after a life-threatening injury.

== Biography ==
Murphy was raised in County Limerick and went on to study law at the University of California. His first win under Rules was on Prom at Tralee in 1983. Barney Curley brought him to England where he would become Josh Gifford's stable jockey. Through this partnership, Murphy rode Deep Sensation to win the 1993 Queen Mother Champion Chase and Bradbury Star to the 1993 Mackeson Gold Cup. He would also ride winners at the Bula Hurdle and the Tripleprint Gold Cup.

He suffered a near fatal fall while riding Arcot at the 1994 Swinton Handicap Hurdle. He made a comeback the following year at Chepstow before retiring from the sport.

The book Centaur by Ami Rao was published about Murphy in 2017.
