= Aidan Coleman =

Irish National Hunt Jockey

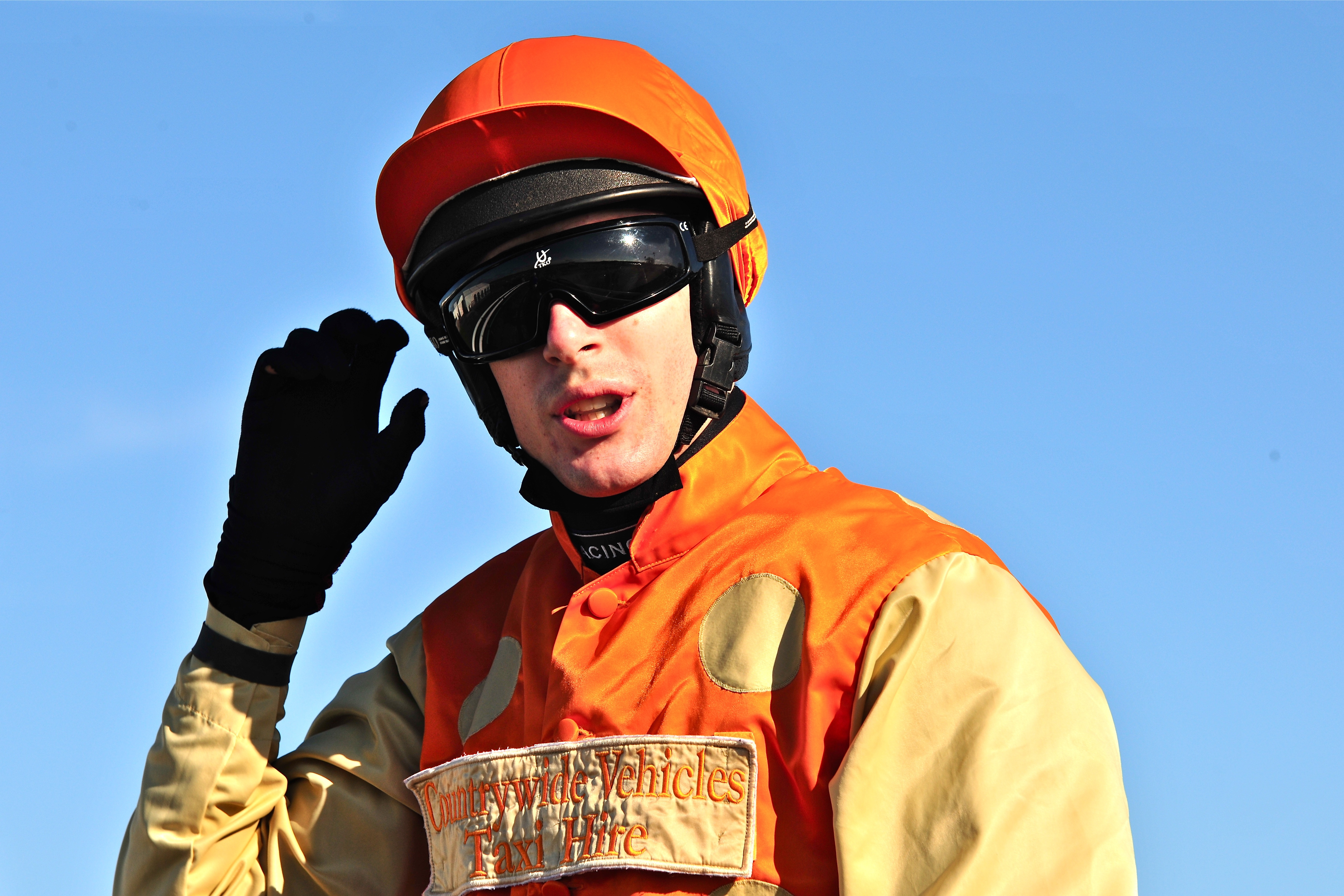
- Coleman in 2012

Personal information
- Nationality: (Republic of Ireland) Irish
- Born: 17 August 1988 (age 37) Cork, Ireland
- Occupation: Jockey

Horse racing career
- Sport: Horse racing
- Career wins: 1251

Major racing wins
- Top Novices' Hurdle (2022); Aintree Hurdle (2022); Fighting Fifth (2020, 2021); Queen Mother Champion Chase (2021); Long Walk Hurdle (2018, 2020); Arkle Challenge Trophy (2020); Stayers' Hurdle (2019); JLT Hurdle (2018)

Racing awards
- Champion Conditional Jockey (2008/09)

Significant horses
- Jonbon, Epatante, Put The Kettle On, Paisley Park

Aidan Coleman (born 17 August 1988) is a retired Irish National Hunt jockey. During a seventeen-year career based in Great Britain, he rode four winners at the Cheltenham Festival and a total of 13 Grade 1 winners. In June 2023 he sustained a serious leg injury in a fall at Worcester and was unable to return to race-riding. He announced his retirement on medical advice in April 2024.

== Career ==
Coleman grew up in the village of Innishannon near Cork in Ireland. The son of schoolteachers, he followed his older brother Kevin into racing, took part in pony racing and moved to England in 2006 to work for trainer Henrietta Knight. His first ride was in December 2006, finishing 9th in a bumper (National Hunt flat race) at Hereford riding Silverbar. His first victory came in October 2007 on Tashkandi in a hurdle race at Uttoxeter. He then switched to the yard of Venetia Williams, winning the 2008/09 champion conditional jockey championship with 55 winners and becoming Williams's retained jockey.

Coleman achieved his first Grade race success aged 19 when Stan, trained by Williams, won the Grade 3 Red Rum Handicap Chase at Aintree on 3 April 2008. Two days later, he rode in his first Grand National and finished in 10th place on the Williams-trained Mon Mome. The following year he opted to ride Stan, the more fancied of Williams's two runners, only to fall at the 7th fence while Mon Mome went on to win under Liam Treadwell. In 2010 he again took the ride on Mon Mome, falling at the 26th fence. Coleman went on to ride in every Grand National up to and including that of 2023 (with the exception of 2020, when the race was cancelled due to the COVID-19 pandemic). His best result was second place on Balko Des Flos in 2022. In 2009 Coleman secured his first win at the Cheltenham Festival when Kayf Aramis won the Pertemps Final.

In 2015, Coleman left the yard of Williams to become retained rider for the new Bloomfields racing operation of John Ferguson in Newmarket. Bloomfields lasted just one season, with the horses auctioned by Tattersalls in April 2016, as Ferguson had been appointed to the post of chief executive of Godolphin. Coleman then spent two seasons as stable jockey to trainer Jonjo O'Neill (jockey) before going freelance.

Coleman secured his first Grade 1 win with Paisley Park, a horse trained by Emma Lavelle that took him to victory in the Long Walk Hurdle at Ascot in December 2018. The pair went on to win the Stayers' Hurdle at the Cheltenham Festival in 2019. There were also two more victories in the Long Walk Hurdle, in 2020 and 2022. In June 2019, Coleman reached the 1,000 career winners mark. Put The Kettle On, trained by Henry de Bromhead provided Coleman with two Grade 1 victories at the Cheltenham Festival, winning the Arkle Challenge Trophy in 2020 and the Queen Mother Champion Chase in 2021. Coleman achieved Grade 1 successes on two horses owned by J. P. McManus and trained by Nicky Henderson, with Epatante winning the Fighting Fifth Hurdle in 2020 and 2021 (in a dead-heat) and the Aintree Hurdle in 2022 and Jonbon adding a further four Grade 1 victories in 2022 and 2023. Coleman rode as stable jockey to trainer Ollie Murphy for the 2020/21 and 2021/22 seasons before going back to freelance riding in order to concentrate on his commitments to Epatante, Jonbon and Paisley Park.

In June 2023, Coleman suffered a career-ending leg injury when Ascension Day crashed through the wing of a hurdle at Worcester. He announced his retirement on medical advice in April 2024.

== Cheltenham Festival winners (4) ==
- Arkle Challenge Trophy – (1) – Put The Kettle On (2020)
- Queen Mother Champion Chase – (1) – Put The Kettle On (2021)
- Pertemps Final – (1) – Kayf Aramis (2009)
- Stayers' Hurdle – (1) – Paisley Park (2019)

== Major wins ==
(United Kingdom) Great Britain

- Aintree Hurdle – (1) – Epatante (2022)
- Celebration Chase – (1) – Jonbon (2023)
- Fighting Fifth Hurdle – (2) – Epatante (2020, 2021 (dead heat))
- Henry VIII Novices' Chase – (1) – Jonbon (2022)
- Long Walk Hurdle – (3) – Paisley Park (2018, 2020, 2022)
- Top Novices' Hurdle – (1) – Jonbon (2022)
- Maghull Novices' Chase – (1) – Jonbon (2023)
- National Spirit Hurdle – (2) – Brewin’upastorm (2021, 2023)
