= Robert Thornton (jockey) =

English jockey (born 1978)

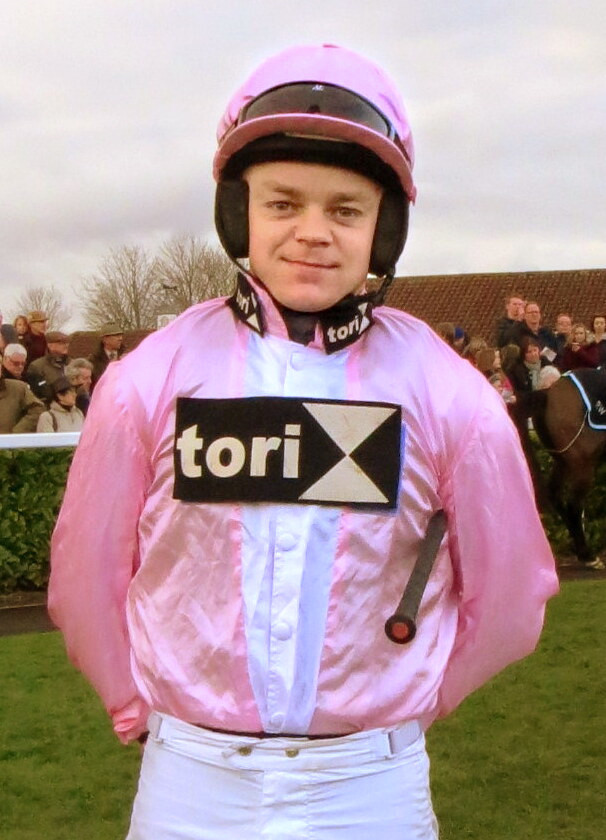
Thornton in 2013

Robert "Choc" Thornton (born 14 July 1978 in Darlington) is a retired English National Hunt jockey.

== Career ==
Robert "Chocolate" Thornton (known as Choc) was one of the United Kingdom's leading National Hunt jockeys. After growing up riding hunters with his father, a professional Huntsman, he started working for trainer David Nicholson in 1997 as an amateur. After immediate success, he became a Conditional jockey, riding 71 winners during his first season in the sport. He won the Conditional Jockey's title the following year.

After making his professional debut in the 1994–95 season, his performance was consistent, if unspectacular, featuring in the top 10 of the British Jumps Jockey Championship. Thornton's most successful season was the 2007/2008-season, during which he broke the 100-winner barrier for the first time, by winning 105 of his 597 races. After Nicholson retired in 1999, Thorton joined up with trainer Alan King. Robert Thornton shies away from the spotlight and he did not talk to the television cameras until he spoke to his owners and trainer.

Robert Thornton's greatest achievements with Alan King were mostly linked to the Cheltenham Festival, where he won his first feature race in 2006, when he rode My Way de Solzen to victory in the World Hurdle. He won the Queen Mother Champion Chase on Voy Por Ustedes in 2007, and the Arkle Challenge Trophy in the same year. Thornton won the Top Jockey title at the Cheltenham Festival in 2007, by riding 4 winners during the meeting. In 2008 he rode three winners including a notable 1st day double. Thornton rode his 1,000th career winner on Araldur at Towcester on 28 March 2011.

He is unrelated to the jockey Andrew Thornton. His worst moment in racing was when Strong Promise died in the 2000 Martel Cup at Liverpool.Thornton was forced into early retirement in 2015, after being unable to recover from a fall at Chepstow in 2014, where he sustained a fractured vertebrae with further complications to the neck and arms.

== Cheltenham Festival Winners ==
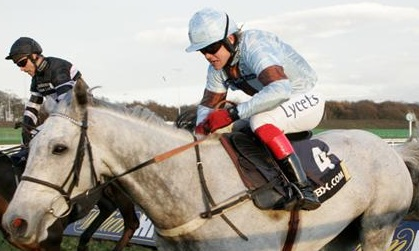
Robert Thornton on Kandjar D'Allier during the 2007 WBX Rehearsal Chase on Fighting Fifth Hurdle day

Cheltenham Festival winners (15)
| Year | Race | Mount |
|---|---|---|
| 1997 | Fulke Walwyn Kim Muir Challenge Cup | King Lucifer |
| 1997 | Pertemps Final | Pharanear |
| 2004 | Festival Trophy Handicap Chase | Fork Lightning |
| 2005 | Festival Trophy Handicap Chase | Kelami |
| 2005 | Triumph Hurdle | Penzance |
| 2006 | Arkle Challenge Trophy | Voy Por Ustedes |
| 2006 | World Hurdle | My Way de Solzen |
| 2007 | Arkle Challenge Trophy | My Way de Solzen |
| 2007 | Queen Mother Champion Chase | Voy Por Ustedes |
| 2007 | Triumph Hurdle | Katchit |
| 2007 | Johnny Henderson Grand Annual Chase | Andreas |
| 2008 | Supreme Novices' Hurdle | Captain Cee Bee |
| 2008 | Champion Hurdle | Katchit |
| 2008 | Albert Bartlett Novices' Hurdle | Nenuphar Collonges |
| 2011 | Festival Trophy Handicap Chase | Bensalem |

== See also ==
- List of jockeys
