= Cheltenham Racecourse =

National Hunt racecourse in England

Coordinates: 51°55′13″N 2°3′28″W

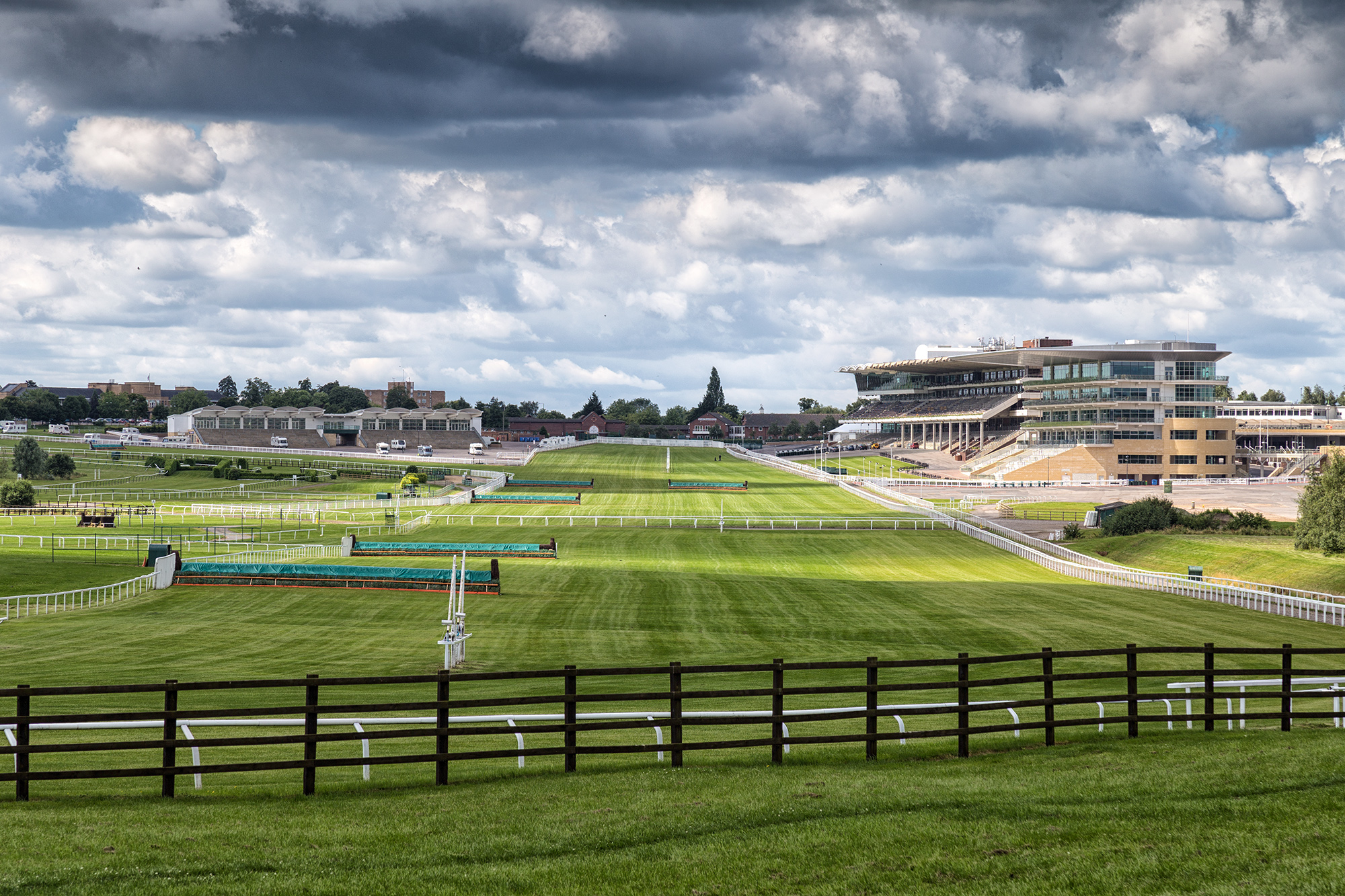
- The stands and home straight
- Interactive map of Cheltenham Racecourse
- Location: Cheltenham, Gloucestershire
- Owned by: Jockey Club Racecourses
- Screened on: Racing TV, ITV (TV network)
- Course type: National Hunt

Cheltenham Racecourse at Prestbury Park, near Cheltenham, Gloucestershire, England, hosts National Hunt horse racing. Racing at Cheltenham took place in 1815, but comprised only minor flat races on Nottingham Hill. The first racing on Cleeve Hill was on Tuesday 25 August 1818 when the opening race was won by Miss Tidmarsh, owned by Mr E Jones. It was a year later when the results were printed in the Racing Calendar when a programme of flat racing was watched by the Duke of Gloucester who donated 100 Guineas to the prize fund. By 1831 races were being staged at Prestbury, although not on the present day course. In 1834 the Grand Annual Steeplechase was run for the first time. In 1839 Lottery won the Grand Annual having previously won the first Aintree Grand National. In 1840 the meeting transferred to Andoversford for a brief period, only to return to Prestbury in 1847. 1902 was a notable year in that racing moved to the present course at Prestbury Park. The new stands were completed in 1914 and the present day Festival races, as we know them, began to take shape. The Cheltenham Gold Cup, over 3 ¼ miles, was run for the first time in 1924, with the Champion Hurdle following in 1927.

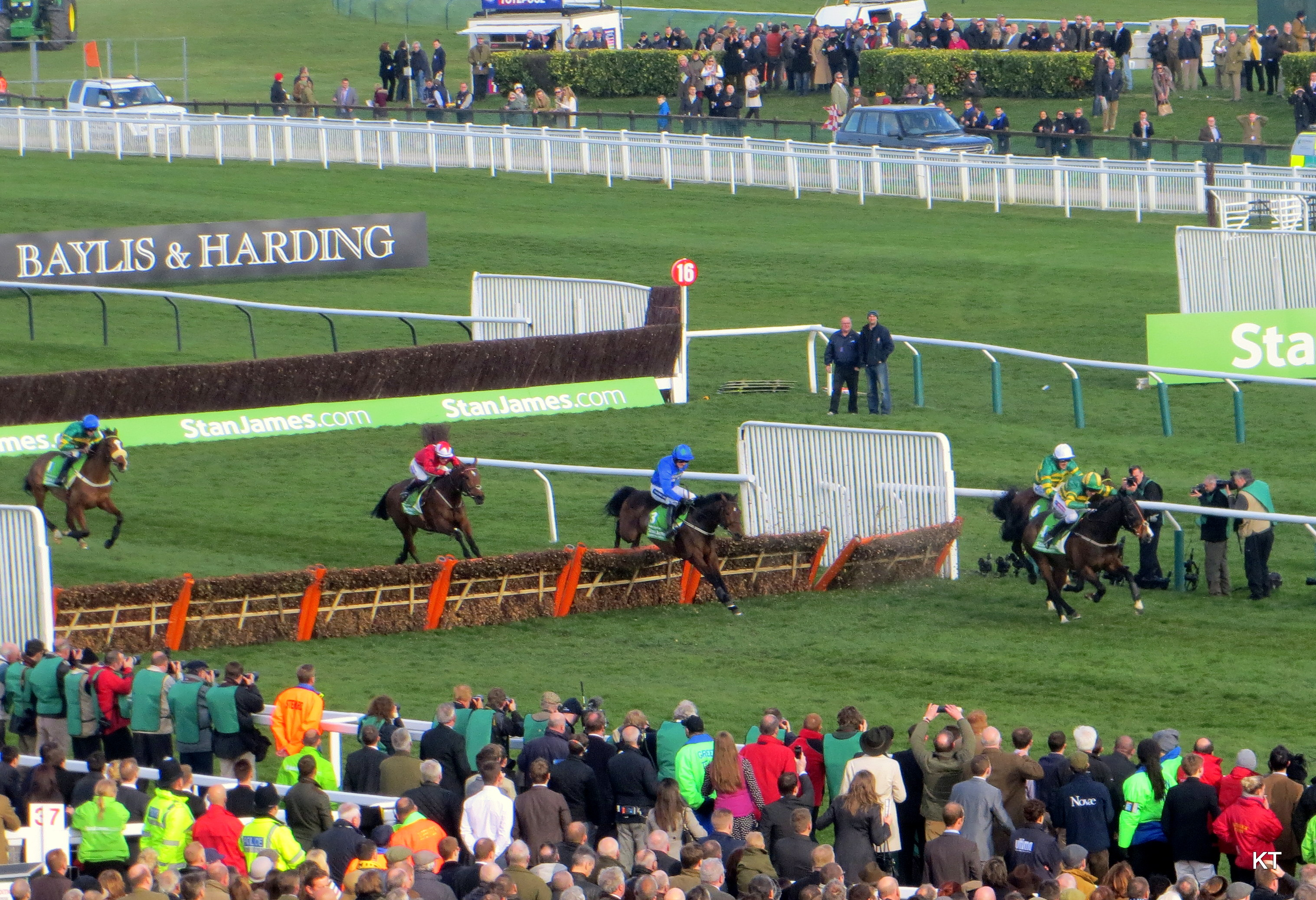
The finish to the 2014 Champion Hurdle

The course's most prestigious meeting is the Cheltenham Festival, held in March, which features several Grade I races including the Cheltenham Gold Cup, Champion Hurdle, Queen Mother Champion Chase, Ryanair Chase and the Stayers' Hurdle.

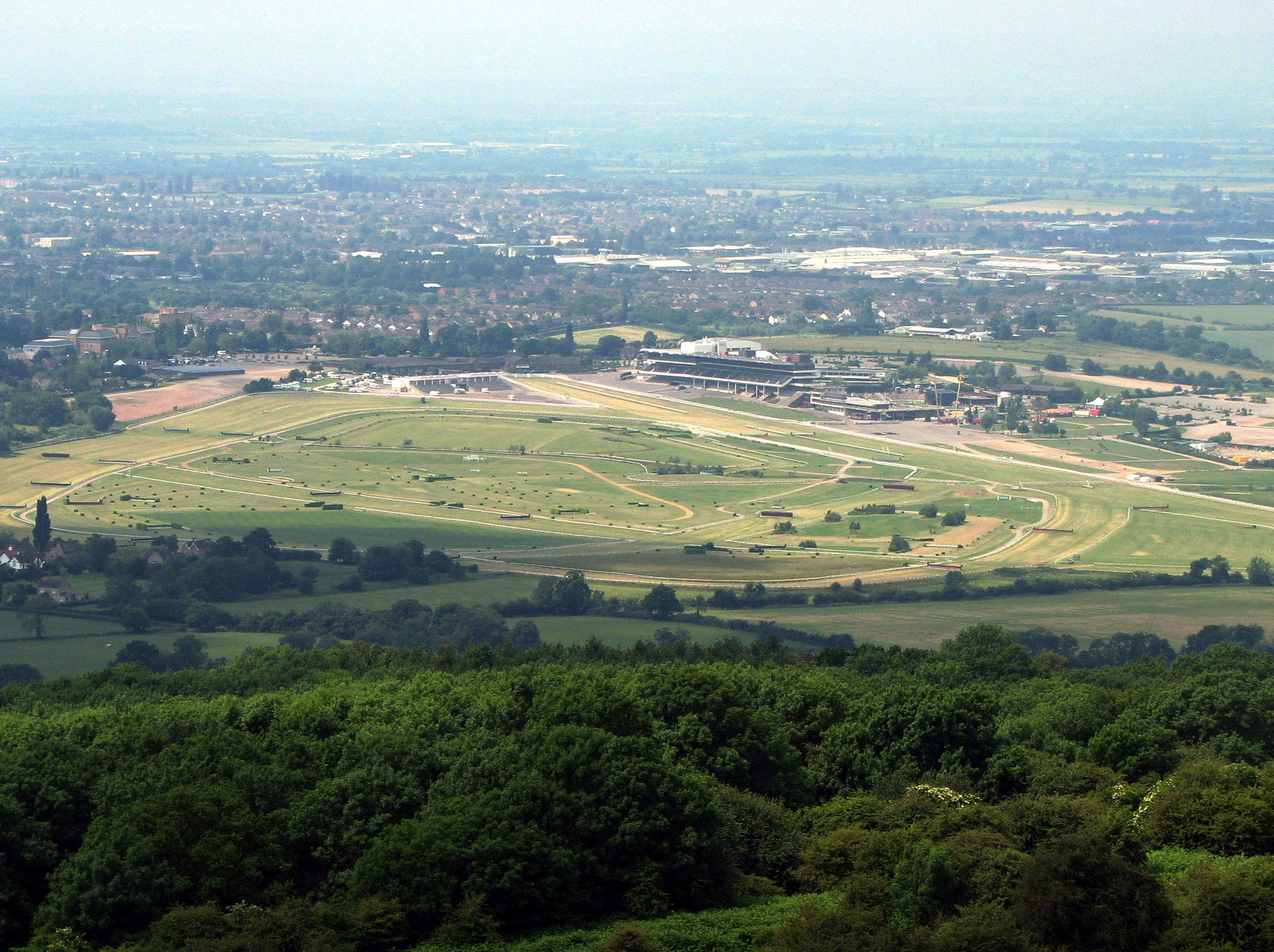
The racecourse seen from Cleeve Hill

The racecourse has a scenic location in a natural amphitheatre, just below the escarpment of the Cotswold Hills at Cleeve Hill, with a capacity of 67,500 spectators. Cheltenham Racecourse railway station no longer connects to the national rail network, but is the southern terminus of the preserved Gloucestershire Warwickshire Railway.

The main racecourse has two separate courses alongside each other, the Old Course and the New Course. The New Course has a tricky downhill fence and a longer run-in for steeplechases than the Old Course. Hurdle races over two miles on the New Course also have a slight peculiarity in that most of the hurdles are jumped early on in the race with only two hurdles being jumped in the last seven furlongs. The Old Course is the racecourse used for The Showcase, The November Meeting and the first two days of the Cheltenham Festival. There is also a cross-country course which is laid out inside the main racecourse and is used for cross-country steeplechases.

The racecourse is the home of The Centaur, one of the largest auditoria in the South West of England. This multiple-use complex seats over 2,000 people for conferences and around 4,000 standing for concerts. It is also home to the Steeplechasing Hall of Fame. From 1999 to 2013, the racecourse was the venue for the annual Greenbelt festival and remains the venue for the Wychwood Music Festival. The University of Gloucestershire holds its graduation ceremony and summer ball at the racecourse. Alongside its other events, the racecourse hosts a weekly market and car boot sale, which resumed in March 2026 after a 20-year hiatus.

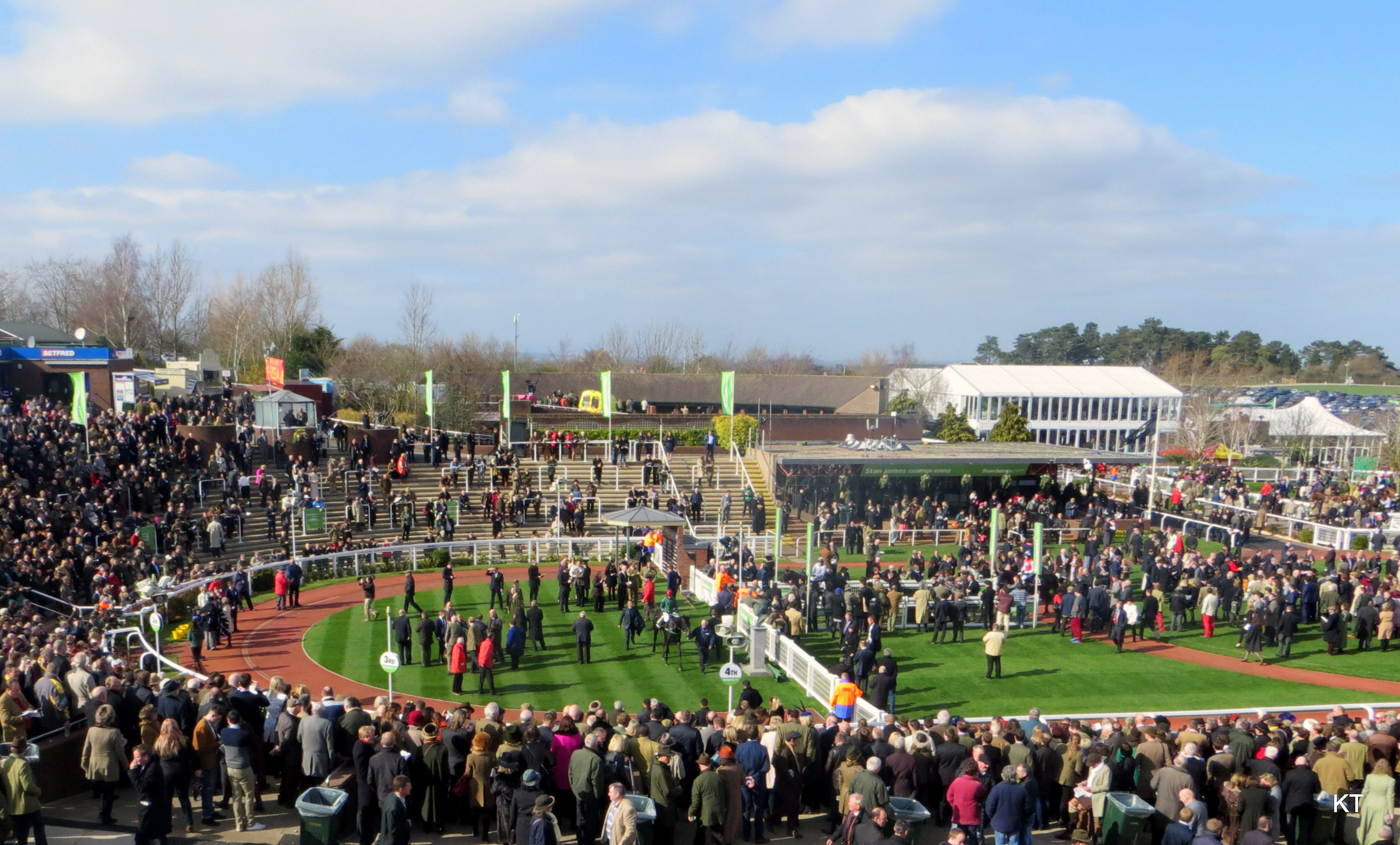
The parade ring during the 2014 Festival

In 2001 during the 2001 United Kingdom foot-and-mouth outbreak, the 2001 Cheltenham Festival was cancelled for the first time since 1943 due to World War II.

From 2008, the racecourse and The Jockey Club were in talks with Cheltenham Town F.C. about a possible move to the racecourse. This would have meant the building of a new stadium with a double-sided stand, one side in the stadium and the other for watching the races. In 2011, Cheltenham Town F.C. decided against the move for financial reasons. The racecourse featured in the 2010 novel Jump! by Jilly Cooper. In 2026, one of the bars at the racecourse was renamed The Rutshire Arms and a memorial bench was installed to commemorate Cooper.

In 2015, Cheltenham Racecourse opened the £45m 6,500-capacity Princess Royal Stand, which completed the redevelopment of the course.

== Notable races ==
| Month | Meeting | DOW | Race name | Type | Grade | Distance | Course | Age/Sex |
|---|---|---|---|---|---|---|---|---|
| January | New Year | 1st | Fairlawne Handicap Chase | Chase | Premier Handicap | 2m 5f | New | 5yo + |
| January | New Year | 1st | Dipper Novices' Chase | Chase | Grade 2 | 2m 5f | New | 5yo + |
| January | New Year | 1st | Relkeel Hurdle | Hurdle | Grade 2 | 2m 4½f | New | 4yo + |
| January | Trials | Saturday | Finesse Juvenile Novices' Hurdle | Hurdle | Grade 2 | 2m 1f | New | 4yo only |
| January | Trials | Saturday | Paddy Power Cheltenham Countdown Podcast Handicap Chase | Chase | Premier Hcap | 2m 4½f | New | 5yo + |
| January | Trials | Saturday | Cotswold Chase | Chase | Grade 2 | 3m 1½f | New | 5yo + |
| January | Trials | Saturday | Cleeve Hurdle | Hurdle | Grade 2 | 3m | New | 5yo + |
| January | Trials | Saturday | Classic Novices' Hurdle | Hurdle | Grade 2 | 2m 4½f | New | 4yo + |
| January | Trials | Saturday | International Hurdle | Hurdle | Grade 2 | 2m 1f | New | 4yo + |
| March | Festival | Tuesday | Arkle Challenge Trophy | Chase | Grade 1 | 2m | Old | 5yo + |
| March | Festival | Tuesday | Ultima Business Solutions Hcap Chase | Chase | Premier Handicap | 3m ½f | Old | 5yo + |
| March | Festival | Tuesday | National Hunt Chase Challenge Cup | Chase | Grade 2 | 3m 6f | Old | 5yo + |
| March | Festival | Tuesday | Supreme Novices' Hurdle | Hurdle | Grade 1 | 2m ½f | Old | 4yo + |
| March | Festival | Tuesday | Close Brothers Mares' Hurdle | Hurdle | Grade 1 | 2m 4f | Old | 4yo + m |
| March | Festival | Tuesday | Champion Hurdle | Hurdle | Grade 1 | 2m 110y | Old | 4yo + |
| March | Festival | Wednesday | Glenfarclas Cross Country Handicap Chase | Chase | Handicap | 3m 7f | Cross | 5yo + |
| March | Festival | Wednesday | Baring Bingham Novices' Hurdle | Hurdle | Grade 1 | 2m 5f | Old | 4yo + |
| March | Festival | Wednesday | Coral Cup | Hurdle | Premier Handicap | 2m 5f | Old | 4yo + |
| March | Festival | Wednesday | Brown Advisory Novices' Chase | Chase | Grade 1 | 3m 80y | Old | 5yo + |
| March | Festival | Wednesday | Champion Bumper | N H Flat | Grade 1 | 2m 110y | Old | 4yo-6yo |
| March | Festival | Wednesday | Queen Mother Champion Chase | Chase | Grade 1 | 2m | Old | 5yo + |
| March | Festival | Wednesday | Boodles Juvenile Handicap Hurdle | Hurdle | Premier Handicap | 2m 110y | Old | 4yo only |
| March | Festival | Thursday | Pertemps Final | Hurdle | Premier Handicap | 3m | New | 5yo + |
| March | Festival | Thursday | Stayers' Hurdle | Hurdle | Grade 1 | 3m | New | 4yo + |
| March | Festival | Thursday | Fulke Walwyn Kim Muir Challenge Cup | Chase | Handicap | 3m 1f 110y | New | 5yo + |
| March | Festival | Thursday | Turners Novices' Chase | Chase | Grade 1 | 2m 4f | New | 5yo + |
| March | Festival | Thursday | Ryanair Chase | Chase | Grade 1 | 2m 5f | New | 5yo + |
| March | Festival | Thursday | Magners Plate Handicap Chase | Chase | Premier Handicap | 2m 4f | New | 5yo + |
| March | Festival | Friday | St James's Place Festival Hunter Chase | Chase | Conditions | 3m 2f 110y | New | 5yo + |
| March | Festival | Friday | Triumph Hurdle | Hurdle | Grade 1 | 2m 1f | New | 4yo only |
| March | Festival | Friday | County Handicap Hurdle | Hurdle | Premier Handicap | 2m 1f | New | 5yo + |
| March | Festival | Friday | Martin Pipe Conditional Jockeys' Handicap Hurdle | Hurdle | Handicap | 2m 4f 110y | New | 4yo + |
| March | Festival | Friday | Albert Bartlett Novices' Hurdle | Hurdle | Grade 1 | 3m | New | 4yo + |
| March | Festival | Friday | Cheltenham Gold Cup | Chase | Grade 1 | 3m 2f 110y | New | 5yo + |
| March | Festival | Friday | Johnny Henderson Grand Annual Chase | Chase | Premier Handicap | 2m 110y | New | 5yo + |
| April | April | Wednesday | Silver Trophy Handicap Chase | Chase | Grade 2 | 2m 5f | New | 5yo + |
| October | Showcase | Friday | Sharp Novices' Hurdle | Hurdle | Grade 2 | 2m 110y | Old | 4yo + |
| November | November | Friday | Hyde Novices' Hurdle | Hurdle | Grade 2 | 2m 5f | Old | 4yo + |
| November | November | Saturday | Paddy Power Gold Cup | Chase | Premier Handicap | 2m 4f 110y | Old | 4yo + |
| November | November | Sunday | Oddschecker Handicap Chase | Chase | Premier Handicap | 3m 3f ½y | Old | 4yo + |
| November | November | Saturday | Prestbury Juvenile Hurdle | Hurdle | Grade 2 | 2m 110y | Old | 3yo only |
| November | November | Saturday | Mares' Open NH Flat Race | Flat | Listed | 2m 87y | Old | 4-6yo m |
| November | November | Sunday | November Novices' Chase | Chase | Grade 2 | 2m | Old | 4yo + |
| November | November | Sunday | Greatwood Hurdle | Hurdle | Premier Handicap | 2m 110y | Old | 4yo + |
| December | Christmas | Friday | Turners Handicap Chase | Chase | Premier Handicap | 3m 2f | New | 4yo + |
| December | Christmas | Saturday | Bristol Novices' Hurdle | Hurdle | Grade 2 | 3m | New | 4yo + |
| December | Christmas | Saturday | December Gold Cup | Chase | Premier Handicap | 2m 4½f | New | 4yo + |

== Horse welfare concerns ==
Cheltenham Racecourse is known to be one of the most dangerous in the United Kingdom. Since 2007, Animal Aid has recorded the 133 known deaths on the course. Causes of death include broken bones, spinal injuries, and horse being killed following sustaining injuries from falls.
