= List of Grand National first four placings =

This article lists the first, second, third and fourth-placed runners in the Grand National, a National Hunt horse race held annually over a distance of 4 miles 3½ furlongs at Aintree Racecourse in England.

Shaded areas indicate the unofficial precursors of the Grand National (1836–38), the wartime substitutes at Gatwick Racecourse (1916–18), the cancelled period during World War II (1941–45) and the void race in 1993.

The list features two horses called Peter Simple and two called Royal Mail. It also includes two with slightly different spellings, Mathew (1847) and Matthew (1902). For the purposes of this article, the horses with identical names are distinguished by (1) and (2).

== Grand National 1–2–3–4 ==
Year	First	Second	Third	Fourth	Ran
1836	The Duke	Polyanthus	Cockahoop	Percy	10
1837	The Duke	The Disowned	Dan O'Connell	(only three finished)	4
1838	Sir William	Scamp	The Duke	(others not recorded)	3+
1839	Lottery	Seventy Four	Paulina	True Blue	17
1840	Jerry	Arthur	Valentine	The Sea	13
1841	Charity	Cigar	Peter Simple (1)	Revealer	11
1842	Gaylad	Seventy Four	Peter Simple (1)	The Returned	15
1843	Vanguard	Nimrod	Dragsman	Claude Duval	16
1844	Discount	The Returned	Tom Tug	Caesar	15
1845	Cure-All	Peter Simple (1)	The Exquisite	Tom Tug	15
1846	Pioneer	Culverthorpe	Switcher	Firefly	22
1847	Mathew	St Leger	Jerry	Pioneer	26
1848	Chandler	The Curate	British Yeoman	Standard Guard	29
1849	Peter Simple (2)	The Knight of Gwynne	Prince George	Alfred	24
1850	Abd-el-Kader	The Knight of Gwynne	Sir John	Tipperary Boy	32
1851	Abd-el-Kader	Maria Day	Sir John	Half-and-Half	21
1852	Miss Mowbray	Maurice Daley	Sir Peter Laurie	Chieftain	24
1853	Peter Simple (2)	Miss Mowbray	Oscar	Sir Peter Laurie	21
1854	Bourton	Spring	Crabbs	Maley	20
1855	Wanderer	Freetrader	Maurice Daley	Janus	20
1856	Freetrader	Minerva	Minos	Hopeless Star	21
1857	Emigrant	Weathercock	Treachery	Westminster	28
1858	Little Charley	Weathercock	Xanthus	Morgan Rattler	16
1859	Half Caste	Jean du Quesne	Huntsman	Midge	20
1860	Anatis	Huntsman	Xanthus	Maria Agnes	19
1861	Jealousy	The Dane	Old Ben Roe	Bridegroom	24
1862	Huntsman	Bridegroom	Romeo	Xanthus	13
1863	Emblem	Arbury	Yaller Gal	Fosco	16
1864	Emblematic	Arbury	Chester	Thomastown	25
1865	Alcibiade	Hall Court	Emblematic	Mistake	23
1866	Salamander	Cortolvin	Creole	Lightheart	30
1867	Cortolvin	Fan	Shangarry	Globule	23
1868	The Lamb	Pearl Diver	Alcibiade	Captain Crosstree	21
1869	The Colonel	Hall Court	Gardener	Alcibiade	22
1870	The Colonel	The Doctor	Primrose	Surney	23
1871	The Lamb	Despatch	Scarrington	Pearl Diver	25
1872	Casse Tete	Scarrington	Despatch	The Lamb	25
1873	Disturbance	Ryshworth	Columbine	Master Mowbray	28
1874	Reugny	Chimney Sweep	Merlin	Defence	22
1875	Pathfinder	Dainty	La Veine	Jackal	19
1876	Regal	Congress	Shifnal	Chimney Sweep	19
1877	Austerlitz	Congress	The Liberator	Chimney Sweep	16
1878	Shifnal	Martha	Pride of Kildare	Jackal	12
1879	The Liberator	Jackal	Martha	Wild Monarch	18
1880	Empress	The Liberator	Downpatrick	Jupiter Tonans	14
1881	Woodbrook	Regal	Thornfield	New Glasgow	13
1882	Seaman	Cyrus	Zoedone	(only three finished)	12
1883	Zoedone	Black Prince	Mohican	Downpatrick	10
1884	Voluptuary	Frigate	Roquefort	Cyrus	15
1885	Roquefort	Frigate	Black Prince	Redpath	19
1886	Old Joe	Too Good	Gamecock	Magpie	23
1887	Gamecock	Savoyard	Johnny Longtail	Chancellor	16
1888	Playfair	Frigate	Ballot Box	Ringlet	20
1889	Frigate	Why Not	M.P.	Bellona	20
1890	Ilex	Pan	M.P.	Brunswick	16
1891	Come Away	Cloister	Ilex	Roquefort	21
1892	Father O'Flynn	Cloister	Ilex	Ardcarn	25
1893	Cloister	Aesop	Why Not	Tit for Tat	15
1894	Why Not	Lady Ellen II	Wild Man from Borneo	Trouville	14
1895	Wild Man from Borneo	Cathal	Van der Berg	Manifesto	19
1896	The Soarer	Father O'Flynn	Biscuit	Barcalwhey	28
1897	Manifesto	Filbert	Ford of Fyne	Prince Albert	28
1898	Drogheda	Cathal	Gauntlet	Filbert	25
1899	Manifesto	Ford of Fyne	Elliman	Dead Level	19
1900	Ambush II	Barsac	Manifesto	Breemount's Pride	16
1901	Grudon	Drumcree	Buffalo Bill	Levanter	24
1902	Shannon Lass	Matthew	Manifesto	Detail	21
1903	Drumcree	Detail	Manifesto	Kirkland	23
1904	Moifaa	Kirkland	The Gunner	Shaun Aboo	26
1905	Kirkland	Napper Tandy	Buckaway II	Ranunculus	27
1906	Ascetic's Silver	Red Lad	Aunt May	Crautacaun	23
1907	Eremon	Tom West	Patlander	Ravenscliffe	23
1908	Rubio	Mattie Macgregor	The Lawyer III	Flaxman	24
1909	Lutteur III	Judas	Caubeen	Tom West	32
1910	Jenkinstown	Jerry M	Odor	Carsey	25
1911	Glenside	Rathnally	Shady Girl	Foolhardy	26
1912	Jerry M	Bloodstone	Axle Pin	Carsey	24
1913	Covertcoat	Irish Mail	Carsey	(only three finished)	22
1914	Sunloch	Trianon III	Lutteur III	Rory O'Moore	20
1915	Ally Sloper	Jacobus	Father Confessor	Alfred Noble	20
1916	Vermouth	Irish Mail	Schoolmoney	Jacobus	21
1917	Ballymacad	Chang	Ally Sloper	Vermouth	19
1918	Poethlyn	Captain Dreyfus	Ballymacad	Berneray	17
1919	Poethlyn	Ballyboggan	Pollen	Loch Allen	22
1920	Troytown	The Turk II	The Bore	Sergeant Murphy	24
1921	Shaun Spadah	The Bore	All White	Turkey Buzzard	35
1922	Music Hall	Drifter	Taffytus	Sergeant Murphy	32
1923	Sergeant Murphy	Shaun Spadah	Conjuror II	Punt Gun	28
1924	Master Robert	Fly Mask	Silvo	Drifter	30
1925	Double Chance	Old Tay Bridge	Fly Mask	Sprig	33
1926	Jack Horner	Old Tay Bridge	Bright's Boy	Sprig	30
1927	Sprig	Bovril III	Bright's Boy	Drinmond	37
1928	Tipperary Tim	Billy Barton	(only two finished)		42
1929	Gregalach	Easter Hero	Richmond II	Melleray's Belle	66
1930	Shaun Goilin	Melleray's Belle	Sir Lindsay	Glangesia	41
1931	Grakle	Gregalach	Annandale	Rhyticere	43
1932	Forbra	Egremont	Shaun Goilin	Near East	36
1933	Kellsboro' Jack	Really True	Slater	Delaneige	34
1934	Golden Miller	Delaneige	Thomond II	Forbra	30
1935	Reynoldstown	Blue Prince	Thomond II	Lazy Boots	27
1936	Reynoldstown	Ego	Bachelor Prince	Crown Prince	35
1937	Royal Mail (1)	Cooleen	Pucka Belle	Ego	33
1938	Battleship	Royal Danieli	Workman	Cooleen	36
1939	Workman	MacMoffat	Kilstar	Cooleen	37
1940	Bogskar	MacMoffat	Gold Arrow	Symaethis	30
1941–45	Cancelled due to World War II				
1946	Lovely Cottage	Jack Finlay	Prince Regent	Housewarmer	34
1947	Caughoo	Lough Conn	Kami	Prince Regent	57
1948	Sheila's Cottage	First of the Dandies	Cromwell	Happy Home	43
1949	Russian Hero	Roimond	Royal Mount	Cromwell	43
1950	Freebooter	Wot No Sun	Acthon Major	Rowland Roy	49
1951	Nickel Coin	Royal Tan	Derrinstown	(only three finished)	36
1952	Teal	Legal Joy	Wot No Sun	Uncle Barney	47
1953	Early Mist	Mont Tremblant	Irish Lizard	Overshadow	31
1954	Royal Tan	Tudor Line	Irish Lizard	Churchtown	29
1955	Quare Times	Tudor Line	Carey's Cottage	Gigolo	30
1956	E.S.B.	Gentle Moya	Royal Tan	Eagle Lodge	29
1957	Sundew	Wyndburgh	Tiberetta	Glorious Twelfth	35
1958	Mr. What	Tiberetta	Green Drill	Wyndburgh	31
1959	Oxo	Wyndburgh	Mr. What	Tiberetta	34
1960	Merryman II	Badanloch	Clear Profit	Tea Fiend	26
1961	Nicolaus Silver	Merryman II	O'Malley Point	Scottish Flight II	35
1962	Kilmore	Wyndburgh	Mr What	Gay Navarree	32
1963	Ayala	Carrickbeg	Hawa's Song	Team Spirit	47
1964	Team Spirit	Purple Silk	Peacetown	Eternal	33
1965	Jay Trump	Freddie	Mr Jones	Rainbow Battle	47
1966	Anglo	Freddie	Forest Prince	The Fossa	47
1967	Foinavon	Honey End	Red Alligator	Greek Scholar	44
1968	Red Alligator	Moidore's Token	Different Class	Rutherfords	45
1969	Highland Wedding	Steel Bridge	Rondetto	The Beeches	30
1970	Gay Trip	Vulture	Miss Hunter	Dozo	28
1971	Specify	Black Secret	Astbury	Bowgeeno	38
1972	Well To Do	Gay Trip	Black Secret; General Symons	(dead-heat for third)	42
1973	Red Rum	Crisp	L'Escargot	Spanish Steps	38
1974	Red Rum	L'Escargot	Charles Dickens	Spanish Steps	42
1975	L'Escargot	Red Rum	Spanish Steps	Money Market	31
1976	Rag Trade	Red Rum	Eyecatcher	Barona	32
1977	Red Rum	Churchtown Boy	Eyecatcher	The Pilgarlic	42
1978	Lucius	Sebastian V	Drumroan	Coolishall	37
1979	Rubstic	Zongalero	Rough and Tumble	The Pilgarlic	34
1980	Ben Nevis	Rough and Tumble	The Pilgarlic	Royal Stuart	30
1981	Aldaniti	Spartan Missile	Royal Mail (2)	Three to One	39
1982	Grittar	Hard Outlook	Loving Words	Delmoss	39
1983	Corbiere	Greasepaint	Yer Man	Hallo Dandy	41
1984	Hallo Dandy	Greasepaint	Corbiere	Lucky Vane	40
1985	Last Suspect	Mr Snugfit	Corbiere	Greasepaint	40
1986	West Tip	Young Driver	Classified	Mr Snugfit	40
1987	Maori Venture	The Tsarevich	Lean Ar Aghaidh	West Tip	40
1988	Rhyme 'n' Reason	Durham Edition	Monanore	West Tip	40
1989	Little Polveir	West Tip	The Thinker	Lastofthebrownies	40
1990	Mr Frisk	Durham Edition	Rinus	Brown Windsor	38
1991	Seagram	Garrison Savannah	Auntie Dot	Over the Road	40
1992	Party Politics	Romany King	Laura's Beau	Docklands Express	40
1993	Race void				
1994	Miinnehoma	Just So	Moorcroft Boy	Ebony Jane	36
1995	Royal Athlete	Party Politics	Over the Deel	Dubacilla	35
1996	Rough Quest	Encore un Peu	Superior Finish	Sir Peter Lely	27
1997	Lord Gyllene	Suny Bay	Camelot Knight	Buckboard Bounce	36
1998	Earth Summit	Suny Bay	Samlee	St Mellion Fairway	37
1999	Bobbyjo	Blue Charm	Call It a Day	Addington Boy	32
2000	Papillon	Mely Moss	Niki Dee	Brave Highlander	40
2001	Red Marauder	Smarty	Blowing Wind	Papillon	40
2002	Bindaree	What's Up Boys	Blowing Wind	Kingsmark	40
2003	Monty's Pass	Supreme Glory	Amberleigh House	Gunner Welburn	40
2004	Amberleigh House	Clan Royal	Lord Atterbury	Monty's Pass	39
2005	Hedgehunter	Royal Auclair	Simply Gifted	It Takes Time	40
2006	Numbersixvalverde	Hedgehunter	Clan Royal	Nil Desperandum	40
2007	Silver Birch	McKelvey	Slim Pickings	Philson Run	40
2008	Comply or Die	King Johns Castle	Snowy Morning	Slim Pickings	40
2009	Mon Mome	Comply or Die	My Will	State of Play	40
2010	Don't Push It	Black Apalachi	State of Play	Big Fella Thanks	40
2011	Ballabriggs	Oscar Time	Don't Push It	State of Play	40
2012	Neptune Collonges	Sunnyhillboy	Seabass	Cappa Bleu	40
2013	Auroras Encore	Cappa Bleu	Teaforthree	Oscar Time	40
2014	Pineau de Re	Balthazar King	Double Seven	Alvarado	40
2015	Many Clouds	Saint Are	Monbeg Dude	Alvarado	39
2016	Rule the World	The Last Samuri	Vics Canvas	Gilgamboa	39
2017	One For Arthur	Cause of Causes	Saint Are	Blaklion	40
2018	Tiger Roll	Pleasant Company	Bless The Wings	Anibale Fly	38
2019	Tiger Roll	Magic of Light	Rathvinden	Walk in the Mill	40
2020	Cancelled due to coronavirus pandemic				
2021	Minella Times	Balko Des Flos	Any Second Now	Burrows Saint	40
2022	Noble Yeats	Any Second Now	Delta Work	Santini	40
2023	Corach Rambler	Vanillier	Gaillard Du Mesnil	Noble Yeats	39
2024	I Am Maximus	Delta Work	Minella Indo	Galvin	32
2025	Nick Rockett	I Am Maximus	Grangeclare West	Iroko	34
2026	I Am Maximus	Iroko	Jordans	Johnnywho	34

== Horses placed more than once ==
A list of horses which have achieved a first-four placing in the Grand National on more than one occasion.

Shading indicates a horse placed in an unofficial 1830s precursor or a wartime substitute race.

Horse	1st	2nd	3rd	4th	Period
Placed six times
Manifesto	2	0	3	1	1895–1903
Placed five times
Red Rum	3	2	0	0	1973–77
Placed four times
Frigate	1	3	0	0	1884–89
West Tip	1	1	0	2	1986–89
Wyndburgh	0	3	0	1	1957–62
Placed three times
I Am Maximus	2	1	0	0	2024–26
The Duke	2	0	1	0	1836–38
The Lamb	2	0	0	1	1868–72
Cloister	1	2	0	0	1891–93
Huntsman	1	1	1	0	1859–62
L'Escargot	1	1	1	0	1973–75
Royal Tan	1	1	1	0	1952–56
The Liberator	1	1	1	0	1877–80
Why Not	1	1	1	0	1889–94
Kirkland	1	1	0	1	1903–05
Corbiere	1	0	2	0	1983–85
Ilex	1	0	2	0	1890–92
Mr What	1	0	2	0	1958–62
Alcibiade	1	0	1	1	1865–69
Roquefort	1	0	1	1	1884–91
Sergeant Murphy	1	0	0	2	1920–23
Sprig	1	0	0	2	1925–27
Greasepaint	0	2	0	1	1983–85
Peter Simple (1)	0	1	2	0	1841–45
Tiberetta	0	1	1	1	1957–59
Chimney Sweep	0	1	0	2	1874–77
Cooleen	0	1	0	2	1937–39
Jackal	0	1	0	2	1875–79
Xanthus	0	0	2	1	1858–62
Carsey	0	0	1	2	1910–13
Spanish Steps	0	0	1	2	1973–75
State of Play	0	0	1	2	2009–11
The Pilgarlic	0	0	1	2	1977–80
Placed twice
Abd-el-Kader	2	0	0	0	1850–51
Peter Simple (2)	2	0	0	0	1849–53
Poethlyn	2	0	0	0	1918–19
Reynoldstown	2	0	0	0	1935–36
The Colonel	2	0	0	0	1869–70
Tiger Roll	2	0	0	0	2018–19
Comply or Die	1	1	0	0	2008–09
Cortolvin	1	1	0	0	1866–67
Drumcree	1	1	0	0	1901–03
Father O'Flynn	1	1	0	0	1892–96
Freetrader	1	1	0	0	1855–56
Gay Trip	1	1	0	0	1970–72
Gregalach	1	1	0	0	1929–31
Hedgehunter	1	1	0	0	2005–06
Jerry M	1	1	0	0	1910–12
Merryman II	1	1	0	0	1960–61
Miss Mowbray	1	1	0	0	1852–53
Party Politics	1	1	0	0	1992–95
Regal	1	1	0	0	1876–81
Shaun Spadah	1	1	0	0	1921–23
Ally Sloper	1	0	1	0	1915–17
Amberleigh House	1	0	1	0	2003–04
Ballymacad	1	0	1	0	1917–18
Don't Push It	1	0	1	0	2010–11
Emblematic	1	0	1	0	1864–65
Gamecock	1	0	1	0	1886–87
Jerry	1	0	1	0	1840–47
Lutteur III	1	0	1	0	1909–14
Red Alligator	1	0	1	0	1967–68
Shaun Goilin	1	0	1	0	1930–32
Shifnal	1	0	1	0	1876–78
Wild Man from Borneo	1	0	1	0	1894–95
Workman	1	0	1	0	1938–39
Zoedone	1	0	1	0	1882–83
Forbra	1	0	0	1	1932–34
Hallo Dandy	1	0	0	1	1983–84
Monty's Pass	1	0	0	1	2003–04
Noble Yeats	1	0	0	1	2022–23
Papillon	1	0	0	1	2000–01
Pioneer	1	0	0	1	1846–47
Team Spirit	1	0	0	1	1963–64
Vermouth	1	0	0	1	1916–17
Arbury	0	2	0	0	1863–64
Cathal	0	2	0	0	1895–98
Congress	0	2	0	0	1876–77
Durham Edition	0	2	0	0	1988–90
Freddie	0	2	0	0	1965–66
Hall Court	0	2	0	0	1865–69
Irish Mail	0	2	0	0	1913–16
MacMoffat	0	2	0	0	1939–40
Old Tay Bridge	0	2	0	0	1925–26
Seventy Four	0	2	0	0	1839–42
Suny Bay	0	2	0	0	1997–98
The Knight of Gwynne	0	2	0	0	1849–50
Tudor Line	0	2	0	0	1954–55
Weathercock	0	2	0	0	1857–58
Black Prince	0	1	1	0	1883–85
Any Second Now	0	1	1	0	2021-22
Black Secret	0	1	1	0	1971–72
Clan Royal	0	1	1	0	2004–06
Delta Work	0	1	1	0	2022–24
Despatch	0	1	1	0	1871–72
Fly Mask	0	1	1	0	1924–25
Ford of Fyne	0	1	1	0	1897–99
Martha	0	1	1	0	1878–79
Maurice Daley	0	1	1	0	1852–55
Rough and Tumble	0	1	1	0	1979–80
Saint Are	0	1	1	0	2015–17
Scarrington	0	1	1	0	1871–72
The Bore	0	1	1	0	1920–21
Wot No Sun	0	1	1	0	1950–52
Bridegroom	0	1	0	1	1861–62
Cappa Bleu	0	1	0	1	2012–13
Cyrus	0	1	0	1	1882–84
Delaneige	0	1	0	1	1933–34
Detail	0	1	0	1	1902–03
Drifter	0	1	0	1	1922–24
Ego	0	1	0	1	1936–37
Filbert	0	1	0	1	1897–98
Iroko	0	1	0	1	2025–26
Jacobus	0	1	0	1	1915–16
Melleray's Belle	0	1	0	1	1929–30
Mr Snugfit	0	1	0	1	1985–86
Oscar Time	0	1	0	1	2011–13
Pearl Diver	0	1	0	1	1868–71
The Returned	0	1	0	1	1842–44
Tom West	0	1	0	1	1907–09
Blowing Wind	0	0	2	0	2001–02
Bright's Boy	0	0	2	0	1926–27
Eyecatcher	0	0	2	0	1976–77
Irish Lizard	0	0	2	0	1953–54
M.P.	0	0	2	0	1889–90
Sir John	0	0	2	0	1850–51
Thomond II	0	0	2	0	1934–35
Cromwell	0	0	1	1	1948–49
Downpatrick	0	0	1	1	1880–83
Sir Peter Laurie	0	0	1	1	1852–53
Slim Pickings	0	0	1	1	2007–08
Tom Tug	0	0	1	1	1844–45
Alvarado	0	0	0	2	2014–15

The following performances are included above, but are not strictly defined as "placed" due to a low number of runners:

- Cyrus (fourth of fifteen in 1884)
- Downpatrick (fourth of ten in 1883)
- Jackal (fourth of twelve in 1878)
- The Returned (fourth of fifteen in 1842)
- Tom Tug (fourth of fifteen in 1845)
- Xanthus (fourth of thirteen in 1862)

1836–1838	"A History of Steeple-Chasing". (for details, see Bibliography)
1839–1907	"Heroes and Heroines of the Grand National". (for details, see Bibliography)
1908–1987	Online newspaper archives and articles.
1988–present	Online results from the Racing Post.

== Bibliography ==
- Abelson, Edward; John Tyrrel (1993). The Breedon Book of Horse Racing Records. Breedon Books. pp. 239–244. ISBN 1-873626-15-0.
- Blew, William C. A. (1901). A History of Steeple-Chasing. J. C. Nimmo. pp. 73–194.
- Green, Reg (1988). A Race Apart: The History of the Grand National. Hodder & Stoughton. ISBN 0-340-41578-9.
- Mason, Finch (1907). Heroes and Heroines of the Grand National. The Biographical Press.
- Randall, John; Tony Morris (1985). Horse Racing: The Records. Guinness Superlatives Ltd. pp. 89–97. ISBN 0-85112-446-1.
