= 1986 Grand National =

English steeplechase horse race

- Grand National
- Location: Aintree Racecourse
- Date: 5 April 1986
- Winning horse: (Republic of Ireland) West Tip
- Starting price: 15/2
- Jockey: (Northern Ireland) Richard Dunwoody
- Trainer: Michael Oliver
- Owner: Peter Luff
- Conditions: Good to soft

External videos
- 1986 Grand National in full BBC Sport/YouTube

The 1986 Grand National (officially known as the Seagram Grand National for sponsorship reasons) was the 140th running of the Grand National horse race that took place at Aintree Racecourse near Liverpool, England, on 5 April 1986.

The race was won by nine-year-old 15/2 second favourite West Tip, ridden by jockey Richard Dunwoody. in a time of 9 minutes, 33 seconds for a prize of £57,254. The winner was owned by Mr Peter Luff and trained in Droitwich, Worcestershire by Michael Oliver.

== Build-up, leading contenders and the race ==
One hundred and nine horses were entered the 1986 Grand National of which fifty six stood their ground and declared to run For health and safety reasons only a maximum field of forty could take part so the sixteen entrants given the lowest handicap mark by handicapper, Captain Christopher Mordaunt were balloted out. These included former competitors, King Spruce, Onapromise and Colonel Christy

The previous year's runner up, Mr Snugfit was installed as the 13/2 favourite despite having been injured for a time during the season and having run unimpressively in his last four starts. Phil Tuck took the mount, as he had done last year. with last year's favourite, West Tip was again heavily supported at 15/2 with many of his supporters feeling that he had been unlucky when falling at Becher's Brook while disputing the lead last year. His jockey on that occasion, Richard Dunwoody was released from his retainer on Port Askaig to take the mount on the second favourite. Four months before the National, West Tip had been defeated by the impressive chaser, Door Latch, considered by the racing press as owner, Jim Joel's best chance of winning the race in his almost thirty years of trying. Richard Rowe took the mount on the 9/1 chance trained by former champion jockey Josh Gifford. The remaining public support was placed in former winners, Corbiere and Last Suspect who would both set off at 14/1 in company of their riders in victory, Ben de Haan and Hywell Davies.

Aside from these main contenders the majority of the remainder of public support was placed with The Tsarevich, former twice runner up, Greasepaint and 1984 winner Hallo Dandy at 16/1. Mark Dwyer was considered to have the best chance of the seven riders taking part in their debut National on board 18/1 shot Knock Hill. Among the other six debut riders was future winner Steve Knight, riding Tracy's Special.

Unusually there were no riders taking part with experience of more than six previous rides in the race with Steve Smith Eccles, on board Classified and Paul Barton, on Fethard Friend both taking their seventh mounts

Starter, Michael Sayers was starting his third National and had some difficulty communicating instructions to Czech rider, Vaclav Chalupka, on board the top weight, Essex who did not speak English but still managed to dispatch the forty competitors at the first attempt.

Richard Rowe's race ended early when Door Latch exited at the first fence while Corbiere fell at the fourth. Last Suspect was always well to the rear before being pulled up at the eighteenth fence but both West Tip and Mr Snugfit were well in contention in a leading group of eight crossing the Melling Road towards the second last fence. West Tip had cruised up into second place at that point behind the 66/1 outsider, Young Driver with Classified, The Tsarevich and Sommelier the other challengers with Mr Snugfit having dropped back to eighth. West Tip moved upsides Young Driver after jumping the final fence and always looked comfortable on the run in despite only defeating the outsider by two lengths.

== Finishing order ==
Position	Name	Jockey	Age	Weight	SP	Distance
1st	West Tip	Richard Dunwoody	9	10-11	15/2	Won by 2 lengths
2nd	Young Driver	Chris Grant	9	10-0	66/1	20 lengths
3rd	Classified	Steve Smith-Eccles	10	10-3	22/1	
4th	Mr Snugfit	Phil Tuck	9	10-7	13/2 F	
5th	Sommelier	Tom Taaffe	8	10-0	50-1	
6th	Broomy Bank	Peter Scudamore	11	10-3	20-1	
7th	The Tsarevich	John White	10	10-7	16-1	
8th	Monanore	Tom Morgan	9	10-0	22-1	
9th	Little Polveir	Colin Brown	9	10-3	66-1	
10th	Greasepaint	Tommy Carmody	11	10-9	16-1	
11th	Northern Bay	Philip Hobbs	10	10-0	33-1	
12th	Hallo Dandy	Neale Doughty	12	10-8	16-1	
13th	Kilkilowen	Ken Morgan	10	11-3	25-1	
14th	Imperial Black	Reg Crank	10	10-0	66-1	
15th	Rupertino	Gareth Charles-Jones	11	10-0	66-1	
16th	Why Forget	Ridley Lamb	10	10-7	35-1	
17th	Gayle Warning	Mr Sandy Dudgeon	12	10-9	50-1	Last to complete

== Non-finishers ==
Fence	Name	Rider	Age	Weight	Starting price	Fate
1	Door Latch	Richard Rowe	8	11-0	9-1	Fell
1	Port Askaig	Graham McCourt	11	10-5	35-1	Fell
2	Lantern Lodge	Tony Mullins	9	10-7	100-1	Fell
4	Corbiere	Ben De Haan	11	11-7	14-1	Fell
6 (Becher's Brook)	Dudie	Kevin Doolan	9	10-0	100-1	Unseated Rider (3) remounted & Fell
8 (Canal Turn)	Plundering	Simon Sherwood	9	10-1	25-1	Fell
9 (Valentine's Brook)	Mount Oliver	John Bryan	8	10-0	500-1	Fell
9 (Valentine's Brook)	Tracys Special	Steve Knight	9	10-6	150-1	Fell
10	Acarine	Robert Stronge	10	10-13	33-1	Brought Down
10	Another Duke	Paul Nicholls	13	10-4	200-1	Fell
10	Master Tercel	Dermot Browne	10	10-7	150-1	Fell
10	Ten Cherries	Adrian Sharpe	11	10-0	66-1	Fell
15 (The Chair)	Drumlargan	Tommy Ryan	12	11-6	40-1	Fell
15 (The Chair)	Essex	Vaclav Chaloupka	8	12-0	100-1	Pulled Up
17	Doubleuagain	Charlie Mann	12	10-0	500-1	Knocked Over
17	Late Night Extra	Mr Tim Thomson-Jones	10	10-2	500-1	Pulled Up
18	Last Suspect	Hywel Davies	12	11-2	14-1	Pulled Up
19 (open ditch)	Ballymilan	Colin Hawkins	9	10-0	50-1	Unseated Rider
19 (open ditch)	Tacroy	Andrew Stringer	12	10-1	200-1	Unseated Rider
23 (Foinavon)	Knock Hill	Mark Dwyer	10	10-1	18-1	Pulled Up
23 (Foinavon)	St Alezan	Craig Smith	9	10-2	150-1	Brought Down
26	Ballinacurra Lad	Graham Bradley	11	10-8	22-1	Fell
27 (open ditch)	Fethard Friend	Paul Barton	11	10-2	35-1	Pulled Up

== Media coverage and aftermath ==
The official attendance of 75,637 was an increase of over 10,000 on the previous year and 20,000 on the year prior to that. While the Aintree Executive pointed to this as a mark of the recent success in saving the racecourse from being closed, some elements of the press stated that these figures were still some way short of those estimated in the 1920s-50s. In doing so however the press failed to point out that spectators had been able to watch the race for free if they took position on the country side of the Melling Road in those days while they were now charged admission in the modern era.

The race was broadcast live by the BBC as part of its regular Saturday afternoon Grandstand programme in a Grand National special, as it had done every year since 1960. The commentary team for the fifteenth consecutive year was John Hanmer, Julian Wilson and lead commentator Peter O'Sullevan who was calling his forty-first Grand National on Radio or Television. The programme itself was presented by Des Lynam who also leased the horse Another Duke to run in his colours. This situation presented Lynam with the prospect of having to interview himself if the 200/1 outsider were to win, until they departed the contest at the tenth fence. Jockey Paul Nicholls later commented that "He cleared Becher's like a dream then fell at a little one. We [He and Des Lynam] still have a laugh about it"

In addition to its Television coverage, The BBC also broadcast the race live on Radio Two as part of its regular Saturday Sports Programme, having broadcast every National since 1927 with Peter Bromley calling home the winner.

In the post race interview with Lynam, Richard Dunwoody explained how the horse had almost been killed years before in a road accident. "He needed 90-100 stitches and lost an awful lot of blood...It's a miracle he's here today, never mind winning the race."

West Tip over on the far side, has the advantage from Young Driver. West Tip by 2 lengths from Young driver. West Tip by 3 lengths from Young Driver. Young Driver is striding back, but West Tip is going to hold him and win the National, and as they come to the line, West Tip has won the National!

— BBC Commentator Peter O'Sullevan describes the climax of the 1986 National
