= 1985 Grand National =

English steeplechase horse race

- Grand National
- Location: Aintree Racecourse
- Date: 30 March 1985
- Winning horse: Last Suspect
- Starting price: 50/1
- Jockey: (Wales) Hywel Davies
- Trainer: (England) Capt. Tim Forster, OBE
- Owner: (Republic of Ireland) Anne Grosvenor, Duchess of Westminster
- Conditions: Good to Soft

External videos
- 1985 Grand National in full BBC Sport
- Highlights of the 1985 Grand National in German YouTube

The 1985 Grand National (officially known as the Seagram Grand National for sponsorship reasons) was the 139th renewal of the Grand National horse race that took place at Aintree Racecourse near Liverpool, England, on 30 March 1985.

The race was won by eleven-year-old, 50/1 outsider, Last Suspect, ridden by Hywel Davies in a time of 9 minutes 42.7 seconds for a prize of £54,314. The winner was owned by Anne, Duchess of Westminster and trained by Captain Tim Forster in Letcombe Bassett, Oxfordshire.

== Build up, leading contenders and race ==
Aintree chose this year to honour all of the surviving winning jockeys in National history. Almost all of those still alive attended the event which took place in front of the Grandstand two hours before the race was due to take place. Each rider was introduced to the crowd before being presented with an Aynsley China Trophy by Princess Anne. The oldest of those to take part was eighty-two-year-old Tim Hamey who had been victorious aboard Forbra in 1932.

As for its introduction last year, the maximum field safety limit of forty runners was filled with no entrants being withdrawn on the day of the race. The public however were undecided on where they believed the title would fall this year with joint favourites, Greasepaint and West Tip at 13/2. The former had joined an elite group of competitors to have been runner up in the race twice, having done so in each of the last two years and at ten years old was thought to have now reached the prime age at which to go one better and win the race. He was partnered, as in defeat last year by Tommy Carmody. The other co favourite had no Grand National experience for neither horse nor rider but still attracted heavy public attention. The horse, West Tip had been fortunate to survive being hit by a lorry in 1982, which left a huge scar in his hind quarters. Having recovered, he went on to show impressive form by winning four races in the buildup to the National, including The Ritz Club National Hunt Handicap at Cheltenham a few weeks before Aintree. His partner was Richard Dunwoody, the youngest rider in the contest and among thirteen riders making their National debut. Such was the interest in the pair in the days leading to the race that he was asked to appear on the Wogan show on BBC.

Those who questioned the ability of the two favourites turned instead to champion jockey John Francome who would partner 8/1 chance Drumlargen. The horse had been third in the previous year's Cheltenham Gold Cup while speculation was rife that this would be Francome's last attempt at the National, having so far never won the race.

Despite being given top weight of 11 stones 10 lbs, Corbiere was by now something of a housewives' favourite at 9/1, having followed victory in the race in 1983 by finishing third in 1984. This year he would be deprived of his partner in victory, Ben de Haan, through injury and was instead partnered by Peter Scudamore.

Lucky Vane had finished just behind Corbiere last year and followed that by winning the four-mile Happy New Year Chase at Cheltenham in January. His proven ability over long distance saw him backed to 10/1 on the day in partnership with the most experienced rider in the race, John Burke who had won the race in 1976 and had already announced his retirement before what would be his eleventh and final ride in the National.

Those with a more keen eye to study form looked to the bottom of the handicap for a horse that had slipped under the radar of the handicapper and found him in Mr Snugfit, a horse that had only just scraped into the final forty and had won five races in the last four months. They racecourse pundits considered him the eyecatcher of the field and backed him heavily at 12/1 with Phil Tuck taking the ride. His detractors noted however that the handicapper had allotted the horse only 9 stones and that he would have to carry a stone more to meet minimum weight in this race.

The majority of the betting public put their faith in last year's champion Hallo Dandy at 14/1, Fethard Friend at 16/1, and Classified at 20/1 with Hill of Slain, Kumbi, Scot Lane, Broomy Bank, Rupertino, Tacroy and Talon considered the only others in the field capable of winning the race. Last Suspect was among those largely unconsidered at 50/1. In the company of Welsh jockey Hywel Davies he had developed a reputation as a stubborn horse and had pulled himself up in his last race. His owner, Anne, Duchess of Westminster, instantly decided to scratch her horse from the race, having never really wanted to run him in the first place, and when her decision was supported by trainer, Captain Tim Forster it took all of Davies' persuasive powers to convince them to give the horse his chance. The jockey was convinced that Aintree would suit the horse whose jumping and stamina were unquestioned.

The runners were sent off at the first time of asking but a huge groan came from the stands when it was seen that Hallo Dandy was among four horses to fall at the first fence. All of the other main contenders remained in contention at the end of the first circuit with the exception of Lucky Vane who had been pulled up after breaking down jumping Valentine's Brook.

Corbiere had been the most prominent of the favourites on the first circuit but West Tip seemed to be cantering and moved up to dispute the lead as the field came to Becher's Brook for the second time only to crumple on landing and fall. Rupertino, Corbiere and Last Suspect led Greasepaint over the Canal Turn with Mr Snugfit and Classified both still in contention while Drumlargen had stopped at the fence before Becher's and Fethard Friend was tailed off.

At the third last fence Corbiere held a two length lead over Greasepaint, Last Suspect, Mr Snugfit, Rupertino and Classified with Scot Lane and Glenfox still in contention but by the penultimate flight Mr Snugfit had moved up to take the lead and looked assured of victory at the final fence with Corbiere, Greasepaint, Last Suspect and Classified all labouring behind him. However, Mr Snugfit appeared to tire as they reached the elbow, with both Corbiere and Last Suspect making renewed efforts. The latter finished particularly strongly over the final 100 yards to win. The race was won in a time of 9 minutes 42.7 seconds, 40.8 seconds outside the race record set twelve years earlier.

== Finishing order ==
Position	Name	Jockey	Age	Weight	SP	Distance
01	Last Suspect	Hywel Davies	11	10-5 [3 lbs ow]	50/1	Won by 1½ lengths
02	Mr. Snugfit	Phil Tuck	8	10-0	12/1	3 lengths
03	Corbiere	Peter Scudamore	10	11-10	9/1	7 lengths
04	Greasepaint	Tommy Carmody	10	10-13	13/2 JF	
05	Classified	John White	9	10-7	20/1	
06	Imperial Black	Colin Hawkins	9	10-1	66/1	
07	Rupertino	Robert Stronge	10	10-0	33/1	
08	Scot Lane	Craig Smith	12	10-1	28/1	
09	Glenfox	Mr Denis Gray	8	10-0	50/1	
10	Blackrath Prince	Brian Reilly	9	10-0	66/1	
11	Captain Parkhill	Chris Grant	12	10-0	100/1	Last to complete

== Non-finishers ==
Fence	Name	Jockey	Age	Weight	SP	Fate
01	Hallo Dandy	Graham Bradley	11	10-12	14/1	Unseated rider
22 (Becher's Brook)	West Tip	Richard Dunwoody	8	10-1	13/2 JF	Fell
06 (Becher's Brook)	Tacroy	Andrew Stringer	11	10-3	33/1	Fell
05	Kumbi	Kevin Doolan	10	10-0	25/1	Fell
19	Dudie	Tony Mullins	7	10-0	50/1	Unseated rider
05	Shady Deal	Richard Rowe	12	10-3	50/1	Fell (3) rem, pulled up
01	Talon	Anthony Webber	10	10-0	33/1	Fell
03	Knockawad	Kevin O'Brien	8	10-0	66/1	Fell
06 (Becher's Brook)	Hill of Slane	Steve Smith-Eccles	9	10-2	25/1	Fell
21	Royal Appointment	Padge Gill	10	10-0	66/1	Unseated rider
01	Solihull Sport	Sam Morshead	11	10-0	100/1	Fell
24 (Canal Turn)	Fauloon	Kevin Mooney	10	10-2	66/1	Fell
01	Bashful Lad	Graham McCourt	10	10-3	50/1	Fell
03	Crosa	Stan Moore	10	10-0	100/1	Unseated rider
10	Leney Dual	Mr David Pitcher	10	10-8	100/1	Unseated rider
22 (Becher's Brook)	Immigrate	John Hansen	12	10-0	100/1	Unseated rider
02	Northern Bay	Philip Hobbs	9	10-1	66/1	Fell
21	Drumlargan	John Francome	11	11-8	8/1	Refused/pulled up
10	Lucky Vane	John Burke	10	10-13	10/1	Pulled up
27	Fethard Friend	Paul Barton	10	10-7	16/1	Pulled up
19	Musso	Mr Simon Sherwood	9	10-0	50/1	Pulled up
19	Onapromise	Alan Brown	9	10-5	100/1	Pulled up
24 (Canal Turn)	Clonthturtin	Mr Tim Thomson Jones	11	10-5	50/1	Pulled up
17	Never Tamper	Colin Brown	10	10-3	200/1	Pulled up
17	Greenhill Hall	David Wilkinson	9	10-0	200/1	Pulled up
23	Broomy Bank	Mr Jim Wilson	10	10-7	33/1	Saddle slipped, unseated rider
24	Tubbertelly	Tom Taffe	8	10-1	50/1	Refused
18	Roman Bistro	Paul Nicholls	9	10-3	150/1	Refused
19	Our Cloud	Mr John Queally	9	10-0	150/1	Refused

Note: Sources vary on the fate of many of the competitors. In instances where sources differ, the television footage from the BBC is used as the source.

== Media coverage and aftermath ==
64,924 spectators came through the gates on Grand National day, which marked an increase of over 10,000 spectators on the previous year.

The race was broadcast live by the BBC as part of its regular Saturday afternoon sports programme, Grandstand, which was broadcast as a Grand National special, as it had been done every year since 1960. Des Lynam became the fourth person to host the broadcast, making the first of fifteen consecutive appearances as presenter, replacing David Coleman who had presented all but two of the previous twenty-five broadcasts. Another new innovation this year was the BBC's decision to change the way it filmed the start of the race, switching from the previous shot alongside the runners from inside the course to a new shot taken from a helicopter above the runners. While the overhead shots have continued ever since in the slow motion reruns of the races, it was only used once more in the live footage before being replaced by a camera in a gantry above the banking of the course.

The commentary team remained unchanged from that which had covered every National since 1972. John Hanmer called the race as the runners raced away from and back towards the racecourse proper, Julian Wilson called the runners at the far side of the course as they jumped Becher's Brook and the Canal Turn while lead commentator, Peter O'Sullevan called the start and end of each circuit, including the finish, as he had done on first radio and then Television in all bar one year since 1946. Richard Pitman presented a post race rerun, using camera shots not used during the original broadcast, to show viewers what fate had befallen the horse they had backed.

Twenty-five years after jockey Hywel Davies' win, his hometown of Cardigan in Mid Wales held a commemorative dinner to celebrate the anniversary of his Grand National victory. Champion jockey Peter Scudamore, who finished the race third on Corbiere, and Neale Doughty, who won the race in 1984, were among the guests at the dinner in February 2010. Davies said of the horse "In the last race before the National, at Warwick, we went about halfway round and he just pulled up and as a result his owner nearly didn't run him at the National. He was a careful jumper and had never fallen. He got his blood up the day of the National and just went. I kept him out of traffic on the first circuit and just rode him home on the second circuit."

Doughty had been due to ride Hallo Dandy in the race but was forced to withdraw through injury. Trainer Gordon Richards would later intimate that the horse's early exit from the race was due to rider, Graham Bradley's failure to heed his warning that the horse "Took a tremendous hold and tended to over-jump at the opening obstacles." Bradley responded that the criticisms were unfair, stating the horse merely landed too steeply at the first fence.

Mr Snugfit being challenged again by Corbiere. It's Mr Snugfit from Corbiere and Last Suspect putting in a tremendous run towards the stand side. It's Mr Snugfit from Last Suspect, Last Suspect is beginning to get up on the near side and Last Suspect has won it! Last Suspect the winner!

— BBC Commentator Peter O'Sullevan describes the climax of the 1985 National
