= Last Suspect =

British-bred Thoroughbred racehorse

- Sire: Above Suspicion
- Dam: Last Link
- Damsire: Fortina
- Sex: Gelding
- Foaled: 1975
- Country: United Kingdom
- Colour: Seal brown
- Breeder: Eileen Wren, Countess of Mount Charles
- Owner: Anne Grosvenor, Duchess of Westminster
- Trainer: Tim Forster

Major wins
- Grand National (1985)

Last Suspect (foaled 1975) was a British-bred Thoroughbred racehorse who competed in National Hunt racing.

In 1985 he won the Grand National despite being a 50/1 outsider.

== Background ==
Last Suspect was bred by the Countess of Mount Charles, and the brown gelding came from a good breeding background - his sire, Above Suspicion, had been a regular winner on the Flat and his dam, Last Link, had won the Irish Grand National.

Despite this though Last Suspect was said to be "moody, unreliable, disinterested" and developed a reputation for being stubborn.

== Racing career ==
During the race at Warwick prior to the 1985 Grand National, the 11-year-old gelding showed his stubbornness as he pulled himself up. Forster and the Duchess of Westminster only ran him in the National at the insistence of his jockey Hywel Davies who was convinced Aintree would suit the horse whose jumping and stamina were very good. It proved to be the correct decision as Last Suspect won by 1 1/2 lengths in front of Mr Snugfit and the 1983 Grand National winner Corbiere coming in third.

Last Suspect was retired following his National victory, but the Duchess of Westminster decided to bring him out of retirement after seeing that he wasn't flagging and this was proven correct when he won two marathon races in the run up to the 1986 Grand National. However, he was now twelve years old, with eleven more pounds to carry compared to Mr Snugfit who only had an extra seven and was the 13-2 favourite. He had a poor race and was always well to the rear before being pulled up at the eighteenth fence after which he was retired for the final time.

== Grand National record ==
Grand National	Position	Jockey	Age	Weight	SP	Distance
1985	1st	Hywel Davies	11	10-5 [3 lbs ow]	50/1	Won by 1½ lengths
1986	DNF	Hywel Davies	12	11-2	14/1	Pulled up at fence 18

== Pedigree ==
Pedigree of Last Suspect (GB), bay gelding, 1975
Sire Above Suspicion (GB) 1956	Court Martial (GB); 1942	Fair Trial (GB)	Fairway (GB)
Sire Above Suspicion (GB) 1956	Court Martial (GB); 1942	Fair Trial (GB)	Lady Juror (GB)
Sire Above Suspicion (GB) 1956	Court Martial (GB); 1942	Instantaneous (GB)	Hurry On (GB)
Sire Above Suspicion (GB) 1956	Court Martial (GB); 1942	Instantaneous (GB)	Picture (GB)
Sire Above Suspicion (GB) 1956	Above Board (GB); 1947	Straight Deal (GB)	Solario (GB)
Sire Above Suspicion (GB) 1956	Above Board (GB); 1947	Straight Deal (GB)	Good Deal (GB)
Sire Above Suspicion (GB) 1956	Above Board (GB); 1947	Feola (GB)	Friar Marcus (GB)
Sire Above Suspicion (GB) 1956	Above Board (GB); 1947	Feola (GB)	Aloe (GB)
Dam Last Link (GB) 1956	Fortina (FRA); 1941	Formor (FRA)	Ksar (FRA)
Dam Last Link (GB) 1956	Fortina (FRA); 1941	Formor (FRA)	Formose (FRA)
Dam Last Link (GB) 1956	Fortina (FRA); 1941	Bertina (FRA)	La Farina (FRA)
Dam Last Link (GB) 1956	Fortina (FRA); 1941	Bertina (FRA)	Thea (AUT)
Dam Last Link (GB) 1956	Senria (IRE); 1939	Sun Yat-sen (IRE)	Santoi (GB)
Dam Last Link (GB) 1956	Senria (IRE); 1939	Sun Yat-sen (IRE)	Nesta (IRE)
Dam Last Link (GB) 1956	Senria (IRE); 1939	Rozria (IRE)	Captain Ross (USA)
Dam Last Link (GB) 1956	Senria (IRE); 1939	Rozria (IRE)	Proudstown (IRE)
