= 1984 Grand National =

English steeplechase horse race

- Grand National
- Location: Aintree Racecourse
- Date: 31 March 1984
- Winning horse: Hallo Dandy
- Starting price: 13/1
- Jockey: (Wales) Neale Doughty
- Trainer: (England) Gordon W. Richards
- Owner: Richard Shaw
- Conditions: Good

External videos
- 1984 Grand National in full BBC Sport/YouTube

And it's Greasepaint on the far side, Hallo Dandy on the nearside, there's nothing between them as they come to the line. Hallo Dandy on the nearside is just gonna win it, Hallo Dandy has won it!

— BBC Commentator Peter O'Sullevan describes the climax of the 1984 National

The 1984 Grand National (officially known as the Seagram Grand National for sponsorship reasons) was the 138th official renewal of the world-famous Grand National horse race that took place at Aintree Racecourse near Liverpool, England, on 31 March 1984.

For the first time, the field was limited to a maximum of 40 runners. A sell-out crowd at Aintree saw 23 contenders complete the course, breaking the record for most finishers and one which still stands today.

Hallo Dandy won the race, ridden by Welsh jockey Neale Doughty. The pairing had finished fourth in the previous year's National. By the 26th fence Hallo Dandy and last year's runner-up Greasepaint were contesting the lead, which Hallo Dandy took at the second-last and held on to, securing victory by a distance of four lengths. The 1983 winner Corbiere finished third.

There was one equine fatality in the race when Earthstopper collapsed and died after finishing in fifth place.

Racing colours of Mr Richard Shaw - black, black cap, emerald green spots

== Race card ==
Greasepaint was made market favourite on the day of the race, proving popular to a large section of the general public for whom the National was their only bet of the year due to his having been narrowly beaten into second place in the previous year's race. He was also being given 2 lbs less to carry but had yet to win a race since being transferred to the yard of Dermot Weld who was aiming to land a unique spring double, having saddled the winner of the Lincoln Handicap a week before the National.

Broomy Bank was relatively lightly raced prior to his winning the Kim Muir Challenge Cup at the Cheltenham festival a few weeks before the National but with a 66% win rate he was backed to 12/1 for leading amateur rider, Jim Wilson.

Lucky Vane came to Aintree on the back of three victories during the season, the most notable being the Eider Chase, regarded by the racing fraternity as a good Grand National trial. The 12/1 chance would also benefit from the most experienced rider in the field, John Burke, taking his tenth ride in the race, having previously won it in 1976

Grittar returned to try to regain the title he claimed in 1982, having prepared this year with a creditable third place in the Whitbred trial at Ascot. Although given 2 lbs less than when finishing fifth lest year, it was still 5 lbs more than when victorious. Having been partnered by two different riders in his previous attempts he would again have a new jockey in John Francome who had missed the ride the previous year through injury and was also a 12/1 chance.

Hallo Dandy had been a freely available 33/1 chance for the race at the start of 1984, having been pulled up in the Hennessey Cognac Gold Cup but was the subject of huge gambles when the handicapper seemed to have completely underestimated him by raising him just 1 lb in the weights to run carrying ten stones 2 lbs. A good prep race at Ayr and conditions at Aintree suggesting the horse would get the good ground he favoured, as opposed to the soft ground upon which he had tired to finish fourth last year only served to enhance his chances with his backers who sent him off at 13/1 in the hands of regular jockey Neale Doughty.

The majority of the remainder of the betting public placed their faith with last year's winner and top weighted, Corbiere, Cheltenham Foxhunters winner, Eliogarty, 1981 runner up, Spartan Missile, who provided the amateur, John White with the best backed mount of the eleven riders making their debut in the race, and Ashley House, who had been a firm ante post favourite for last year's race before being a late withdrawal. At the other end of the market over a quarter of the field were allowed to go off at 100/1 while thirteen of the field carried the minimum allowed weight of ten stones, having been handicapped below that mark.

== Finishing order ==
The Jockey club appointed a new handicapper and starter for this years race with Captain Christopher Mordaunt framing the weights for the race and Captain Michael Sayers starting the race.

All five leading contenders ran well throughout the first three quarters of the race and were all well placed to mount a challenge as they jumped the Canal Turn for the second time. Greasepaint kicked on to lead at that stage and was joined four fences from the finish by Hallo Dandy who both began to stretch the chasing field. Broomy Bank and Grittar were among those who began to lose touch while Lucky Vane continued to chase the leaders towards the penultimate fence but was fighting for the minor places by the last fence.

Hallo Dandy took a one length lead over Greasepaint at the final fence but was never able to stretch away, keeping the result in doubt right up until the final few strides of the race.

Position	Name	Jockey	Age	Weight	SP	Distance
01	Hallo Dandy	Neale Doughty	10	10-02	13/1	Won by 4 lengths
02	Greasepaint	Tommy Carmody	9	11-2	9/1 F	
03	Corbiere	Ben De Haan	9	12-0	16/1	
04	Lucky Vane	John Burke	9	10-13	12/1	
05	Earthstopper	Richard Rowe	10	11-1	33/1	
06	Two Swallows	Anthony Webber	11	10-0	28/1	
07	Fethard Friend	Gerry Newman	9	10-12	22/1	
08	Broomy Bank	Mr Jim Wilson	9	10-12	12/1	
09	Jivago De Neuvy	Mr Roger Grand	9	11-0	50/1	
10	Grittar	John Francome	11	11-10	12/1	
11	Hill Of Slane	Steve Smith-Eccles	8	10-2	33/1	
12	Tacroy	Frank Berry	10	10-7	28/1	
13	Doubleuagain	Tom Morgan	10	10-5	100/1	
14	Beech King	Pat Kiely	10	10-1	66/1	
15	Eliogarty	Mr Donal Hassett	9	11-5	16/1	
16	Spartan Missile	Mr John White	12	11-4	18/1	
17	Yer Man	Val O'Connell	9	10-2	25/1	
18	Fauloon	Bill Smith	9	10-13	50/1	
19	Another Captain	Andrew Stringer	12	10-1	66/1	
20	Mid Day Gun	Graham McCourt	10	10-3	40/1	
21	Poyntz Pass	H Rogers	9	10-5	100/1	
22	Jacko	Sam Morshead	12	10-4	66/1	
23	Canford Ginger	Colin Brown	9	10-1	100/1	Last to complete

== Non-finishers ==
Fence	Name	Jockey	Age	Weight	SP	Fate
03 (open ditch)	Golden Trix	Kevin Mooney	9	10-1	50/1	Fell
06 (Becher's Brook)	Clonthurtin	Tom Taaffe	10	10-0	100/1	Fell
06 (Becher's Brook)	Hazy Dawn	Mr Willie Mullins	9	10-9	100/1	Fell
06 (Becher's Brook)	Midnight Love	Chris Grant	9	11-4	28/1	Fell
06 (Becher's Brook)	Three To One	Phil Tuck	13	10-2	66/1	Fell
08 (Canal Turn)	Bush Guide	Miss Valerie Alder	8	10-5	33/1	Fell
13	Roman General	Major Malcolm Wallace	11	10-3	500/1	Unseated Rider
15 (The Chair)	Ashley House	Graham Bradley	10	11-13	20/1	Fell
15 (The Chair)	Carl's Wager	Mr Ronnie Beggan	9	10-2	28/1	Fell
17	The Drunken Duck	Alan Brown	11	10-3	100/1	Pulled Up
18	Door Step	Mr John Queally	8	10-2	100/1	Fell
19 (open ditch)	Fortune Seeker	Paul Barton	9	10-0	100/1	Fell
19 (open ditch)	Kumbi	Kevin Doolan	9	10-0	100/1	Fell
19 (open ditch)	Pilot Officer	Mr Adrian Sharpe	9	10-2	33/1	Refused
22 (Becher's Brook)	Imperial Black	Colin Hawkins	8	10-7	50/1	Fell
23	Burnt Oak	Peter Scudamore	8	10-7	25/1	Pulled Up
27 (open ditch)	Silent Valley	Geordie Dun	11	10-8	33/1	Pulled Up

== Media coverage and aftermath ==
The race was watched by an official attendance of 54,583.

The BBC broadcast the race live on Television for the twenty-fifth consecutive year, as part of its regular Saturday afternoon Grandstand programme. This was to be the last year the Grand National coverage was presented by David Coleman. Coleman had presented every television National bar (excluding the 1960 Grand National and the 1977 Grand National). For the thirteenth consecutive year, the commentary team consisted of John Hanmer, Julian Wilson and lead commentator, Peter O'Sullevan who was calling his thirty-ninth Grand National on Radio or Television.

The race was also broadcast live on BBC Radio for the fifty-third time as part of Radio 2's regular Sport on Two programme, with Peter Bromley calling the winner home.
