= Blue Prince (disambiguation) =

Blue Prince is a 2025 puzzle video game.

Blue Prince may also refer to:

- Blue Prince (album), a 2001 jazz album by Philip Catherine
  - "Blue Prince" (song), the title track of the album
- Blue Prince, a commercial variety of the flowering plant Ilex rugosa
- Blue Prince, a racehorse at the 1930s Grand Nationals; see List of Grand National first four placings

== See also ==
- Felipe Estrada (born 1952), Mexican lucador wrestler with the ringname "Principe Azul" (Spanish: Blue Prince)
- Persib Bandung (nicknamed Indonesian: Pangeran Biru, lit. 'Blue Prince'), Bandung, West Java, Indonesia; a soccer club
- Prince Carl, Duke of Västergötland (1861–1951; nicknamed German: Blå Prinsen, lit. 'The Blue Prince'), Swedish prince
- Prince (disambiguation)
- Blue (disambiguation)
