= 1987 Grand National =

English steeplechase horse race

- Grand National
- Location: Aintree Racecourse
- Date: 4 April 1987
- Winning horse: (Wales) Maori Venture
- Starting price: 28/1
- Jockey: (England) Steve Knight
- Trainer: (England) Andrew Turnell
- Owner: (South Africa) Jim Joel
- Conditions: Good

External videos
- Replay of the 1987 Grand National in full YouTube

The 1987 Grand National (officially known as the Seagram Grand National for sponsorship reasons) was the 141st running of the Grand National horse race that took place at Aintree Racecourse near Liverpool, England, on 4 April 1987.

The race was won in a time of 9 minutes, 19.3 seconds, and by a distance of five lengths by the 28/1 each way chance, Maori Venture who provided jockey Steve Knight with his second Grand National ride. The winner was trained in East Hendred, Oxfordshire by Andy Turnell and ran in the black jacket and scarlet cap of his nonagenarian owner, Jim Joel who collected a £64,000 prize.

The field was at full (maximum-allowed) capacity; of the forty runners that started the race, twenty-two completed the course. The well-favoured grey, Dark Ivy, was killed in a fall during the race.

== Leading contenders ==
Eighty nine horses had entered the race with forty-three declared to run, but the maximum starter rule meant that three of the horses from outside the handicap, Doubleuagain, Hill of Slain and Leney Duel were balloted out of the race. Just eleven of the runners were considered of a high enough quality to run with a weight handicap. This was even after the late but expected withdrawal of the recent Cheltenham Gold Cup Champion, The Thinker. That left last year's winner, West Tip as the top weighted competitor of the eleven given a handicap mark, though the actual to weight of 12 stones was given to the American and Czech entries, Bewley's Hill and Valencio as they had not raced enough in the UK or Ireland to warrant a rating. The public installed him as ante post favourite at a very early stage, despite being burdened with 10 lbs more than in victory the previous year and had been impressive when finishing fourth behind The Thinker at Cheltenham. At the off he was down to 5/1 and was partnered, as in his two previous Nationals by Richard Dunwoody.

The grey, Dark Ivy had come from Ireland to race in Britain this year with results, notching up six victories before being beaten second in the Tote Eider Chase at Newcastle. As one of the many on the minimum weight he stood out as the form horse and was already heavily backed before coming to the attention of the once a year punters on the day. described as the housewives choice, he was sent off at 11/2 in the charge of Phil Tuck. At 9/1 Classified was another who attracted public attention on the back of a good performance in the National, when third behind West Tip last year. However the pair would meet this time with Classified on the same weight as last year and in the company of the jointly most experienced rider in the race, Steve Smith Eccles, taking his eighth ride in the race.

Corbiere was the veteran of the field but the 1983 winner was in as good forma fettle as for any of his four previous attempts at the race having finished fourth in the Welsh National four months earlier. Ben De Haan was partnering him for the fourth time for trainer, Jenny Pitman and was backed to 12/1. Her second string, the grey, Smith's Man was also very popular at 14/1 and had already proved himself over one circuit of the course when winning the 1985 Topham Chase Lean Ar Aghaidh was the best supported of the mounts of the sixteen debut riders, which included future winners, Brendan Powell and Marcus Armytage. The claimer, Guy Landau was on board the 14/1 shot.

Other runners popular with the public were 1986 Whitbread Gold Cup Plundering and Peter Scudamore, despite having failed to complete the course the previous year. The Ellier was the mount of Fran Berry, who was having his eighth and final ride in the National, Monanore and The Tsarevich were both also considered to have excellent chances. Those looking for better value each way bets looked towards the young 25/1 shot, Attitude Adjuster and the 1984 Mandarin Chase winner, Maori Venture, who at 28/1 offered punters concerns about his jumping ability. Steve Knight's mount was featured before the race on Television as a potential fairy tale winner for his owner, ninety-two-year-old Jim Joel, who had been trying to see his colours carried to National victory for thirty years. Trainer, Andy Turnell was hoping to improve on his record in the race as a rider, having finished no better than third in twelve attempts.

In the race all the leading contenders, with the exception of Dark Ivy reached the Canal turn on the second circuit. The grey was blocked off by other horses going into Becher's Brook on the first circuit and took a fatal somersault over the fence. Of the others The Ellier seemed off the pace throughout, coming past tired horses in the closing stages to finish seventh while Corbiere was also beaten by the time they reached Becher's second time. Classified was in fourth place when Steve Smith Eccles' saddle slipped at The Canal Turn second time, the rider being unseated. Plundering and Smith's Man both held chances at that stage but weakened on the run back towards the racecourse while Lean Ar Aghaidh led the race almost throughout to that point. After jumping the final fence he was challenged from either side by Maori Venture and The Tsarevich while West Tip's challenge faded. The Tsarevich briefly looked the more likely but never headed Maori venture who gradually opened up a winning lead, The Tsarevich was second, Lean Ar Aghaidh third and West Tip fourth.

== Finishing order ==
Position	Horse	Jockey	Age	Handicap	SP	Distance
1st	Maori Venture	Steve Knight	11	10-13	28/1	Won by 5 lengths
2nd	The Tsarevich	John White	11	10-05	20/1	4 lengths
3rd	Lean Ar Aghaidh	Guy Landau	10	10-00	14/1	
4th	West Tip	Richard Dunwoody	10	11-07	5/1 F	
5th	You're Welcome	Peter Hobbs	11	10-02	50/1	
6th	Tracys Special	Simon McNeill	10	10-00	50/1	
7th	The Ellier	Frank Berry	11	10-00	18/1	
8th	Attitude Adjuster	Niall Madden	7	10-06	25/1	
9th	Northern Bay	Reg Crank	11	10-01	50/1	
10th	Monanore	Tom Morgan	10	10-03	20/1	
11th	Smith's Man	Mark Perrett	9	10-00	14/1	
12th	Corbiere	Ben de Haan	12	10-00	12/1	
13th	Big Brown Bear	Robert Stronge	10	10-02	200/1	
14th	Cranlome	Mark Richards	9	10-00	500/1	
15th	Colonel Christy	Stan Moore	12	10-00	300/1	
16th	Plundering	Peter Scudamore	10	10-11	16/1	
17th	Preben Fur	Andrew Stringer	10	10-00	66/1	
18th	Bright Dream	Richard Rowe	11	10-02	50/1	
19th	Why Forget	Chris Grant	11	10-00	40/1	
20th	Gala Prince	Tim Jarvis	10	10-00	500/1	
21st	Brit	Alan Jones	8	10-01	500/1	
22nd	Insure	Mr Charlie Brooks	9	10-10	45/1	

== Non-finishers ==
Fence	Horse	Jockey	Age	Handicap	SP	Fate
1	Lucky Rew	Charlie Mann	12	10-00	500/1	Unseated rider
1	Smartside	Padge Gill	12	10-00	100/1	Unseated rider
3	Brown Trix	Mr David Pitcher	9	10-08	100/1	Unseated rider
3	Glenrue	Brendan Powell	10	10-03	33/1	Fell
6 (Becher's Brook)	Dark Ivy	Phil Tuck	11	10-02	11/2	Fell
6 (Becher's Brook)	Bewley's Hill (USA)	Mr. William Dixon-Stroud, Jr.	10	12-00	100/1	Brought down
12	Spartan Orient	Luke Harvey	11	10-00	500/1	Unseated rider
13	Run To Me	Mr. Norman Mitchell	12	10-02	150/1	Pulled up
15 (The Chair)	Eamon's Owen	Ms. Jacqui Oliver	10	10-00	200/1	Unseated rider
15 (The Chair)	Little Polveir	Colin Brown	10	10-02	33/1	Unseated rider
17	Daltmore	Tony Mullins	9	10-00	100/1	Pulled up
17	Le Bambino	Chris Warren	10	10-02	500/1	Pulled up
19	Drumlargan	Mr. Geoff Wragg	13	11-02	66/1	Refused
19	Hi Harry	Mickey Flynn	9	10-00	100/1	Pulled up
23 (Foinavon)	Brown Veil	Mr. Marcus Armytage	12	10-01	200/1	Pulled up
24 (Canal Turn)	Classified	Steve Smith Eccles	11	10-03	9/1	Unseated rider
25 (Valentine's)	Valencio (CZE)	Roger Rowell	10	12-00	500/1	Fell
27	Marcolo	Pat Leech	10	10-00	66/1	Unseated rider

== Media coverage and aftermath ==
For the first time since 1978, three time Champion, Red Rum did not lead the parade of runners. Owner, Ginger McCain explained that the 22-year-old horse had a problem with his off hind leg that could result in injury if the horse was risked on the course. 1981 Grand National winner Aldaniti and his rider in victory Bob Champion instead galloped in front of the stands before the race.

The build up, parade and race were still covered, as for every year since 1960, live by the BBC as part of its regular Saturday afternoon Grandstand programme in a Grand National special. The commentary team for the sixteenth consecutive year was John Hanmer, Julian Wilson and lead commentator Peter O'Sullevan, who was calling his 42nd Grand National on radio or television. The programme itself was presented by Des Lynam, who interviewed celebrity race goers and the connections of some of the competitors before the race, and then the winning connections after the race. Shortly after the connections of the winner were interviewed, the race was analysed in a slow motion re-run using camera shots not broadcast during the race itself. Former Grand National jockeys, Richard Pitman and Bill Smith. Both Pitman and Smith made heavy reference throughout toward the loose horse Lucky Rew, who continued riderless after a first fence fall for the duration of the race, by repeatedly stating that the horse would not do it if it did not like it. This was viewed by elements in the press as an attempt to deflect attention from the fall of Dark Ivy, which received only scant mention during the rerun, pointing out that horses are, by nature, herd animals and that a loose horse has a natural inclination to follow a herd of other horses. The race was also broadcast live on BBC Radio 2 as part of Saturday Sport. Most major national daily newspapers in the United Kingdom and Ireland published Grand National special pull outs of various sizes, many with full colour guides.

At the final fence and Lean Ar Aghaidh lands in the lead from Maori Venture, The Tsarevich in third, four is You're Welcome, five West Tip. They're racing towards the elbow and it's Lean Ar Aghaigh being challenged by Maori Venture towards the stand side, The Tsarevich towards the far side. The Tsarevich with his white face on the far side. Maori Venture taking it up now. It's Maori Venture on the near side by half a length from The Tsarevich as they race up towards the line. Maori Venture is gonna win the National. As they come to the line, Maori Venture has won it for 92 year old Jim Joel!

— Commentator Peter O'Sullevan describes the climax of the race

Owner Jim Joel was not at the course to see his colours carried to victory as he was mid-flight to the UK from South Africa. He was however able to attend the following day's victory celebrations, where he announced Maori Venture's immediate retirement from racing. The horse was later left to jockey, Steve Knight, in Jim Joel's will.

The immediate press reaction however centred on the fatal fall of Dark Ivy with graphic images of his fall making the front pages of many of the tabloids on the Monday and causing an initial public outcry in favour of making the race safer or indeed banning it altogether. There had often been brief public anguish towards fatalities in the National but the public outcry on this occasion was greater than the National had ever before faced due to a combination of the public having taken the horse to their hearts before the race and the graphic nature of both his fall and the tabloid coverage in the forty-eight hours after. Worse still was news, released later in the week that Dark Ivy's hide had been sold to a Tannery, albeit against the wishes of the horse's connections. Jockey Phil Tuck had been concussed in the fall but later stated that while everyone connected with the horse was heart broken, he, as a jockey had a job to do and had to get on with it. A small portion of supporters of the Grand National attempted to deflect blame away from the race itself and towards jockey Niall Madden, whose mount, Attitude Adjuster was felt to have taken Dark Ivy's racing line. Although questioned by stewards, it was agreed that Attitude Adjuster was a notoriously difficult ride and that no blame could be put on Madden for causing Dark Ivy's fall. Although the public outcry quickly died down, it has raised the issue of safety at the National to a level of scrutiny that forced Aintree to act after two further fatalities two years later.

The remaining horses and riders returned safely, with the exception of American amateur, William Dixon Stroud who had suffered a broken nose when his mount, Bewley's Hill was brought down by the fatally injured Dark Ivy. Czech horse Valencio was also found to be so injured in the National that he was still unfit to race in the Velka Pardubicka six months later.
