= Fred Wilson =

Fred Wilson may refer to:

- Fred Wilson (baseball) (1908–1948), American Negro league baseball player
- Fred Wilson (footballer) (1912–1953), played Australian football with Richmond in the VFL
- Fred Wilson (politician) (born 1941), Canadian politician
- Fred Wilson (artist) (born 1954), African-American conceptual artist
- Fred Wilson (financier) (born 1961), New York–based venture capitalist
- Fred Wilson (ice hockey) (1892–1971), Canadian ice hockey player
- Fred O. Wilson (1903–1983), American politician, Attorney General of Arizona

== See also ==
- Frederic Wilson (1881–1932), English sportsman and journalist known sometimes as Fred Wilson
- Frederick Wilson (disambiguation)
- Fred F. Willson (1877–1956), American architect
