= Tim Forster =

English racehorse trainer (1934–1999)

Personal information
- Born: 27 February 1934 Cold Ashby, Northamptonshire, England
- Died: 21 April 1999 (aged 65) Ludlow, Shropshire, England
- Occupation: Racehorse trainer

Horse racing career
- Sport: Horse racing
- Career wins: 1,346

Major racing wins
- Grand National (1972, 1980, 1985); Mackeson Gold Cup Handicap Chase; Queen Mother Champion Chase; Hennessy Gold Cup; King George VI Chase.

Honours
- Order of the British Empire

Significant horses
- Martha's Son, Well To Do, Ben Nevis II, Last Suspect, Dublin Flyer

Captain Timothy Arthur Forster, OBE (27 February 1934 – 21 April 1999) commonly known as Tim Forster, was an English racehorse trainer and previously an amateur jockey. As a trainer he had 1,346 winners, including 3 Grand Nationals at Aintree in Liverpool. Forster's last runner as a Licensed Trainer came on 30 May 1998, when he won with Albermarle in a novice chase at Market Rasen.

== Family background and early life ==
Forster was born at Cold Ashby Hall, Cold Ashby in Northamptonshire on 27 February 1934. He was the son of Lieutenant-Colonel Douglas Forster, who as a racehorse owner had won the Wokingham Stakes at Ascot in 1957 with Light Harvest.

He was educated at Eton College and went into the military with the 11th Hussars from 1954 to 1960. He served in Malaya, Cumbria and Northern Ireland and because of this he was commonly known as "The Captain" within racing circles.

== Riding career ==
In 1957, Forster travelled from the 11th Hussars barracks in Carlisle, Cumbria to ride a winner at the Vale of the White Horse ("VWH") Hunt's point-to-point meeting at Siddington, Gloucestershire. Forster rode four winners as an amateur under National Hunt rules.

== Training career ==
When he left the services, he moved to Newmarket in Suffolk as pupil to trainer Geoffrey Brooke. Forster then became Assistant Trainer to Derrick Candy. By August 1962 he became a Licensed Trainer and just a year later he moved from his original yard at Kingston Lisle, in Oxfordshire where he had a few boxes owned by a farmer friend, Colin Nash. When trainer Tom Yates retired due to ill health, he took over the stables at the Old Manor House in Letcombe Bassett near Lambourn in Berkshire.

Just one year later in 1963, Forster celebrated his first winner at the Cheltenham Festival in the United Hunts Challenge Cup with Baulking Green. Forster went on to win the same race with Baulking Green again in 1964, 1965 and 1967.

=== Grand National winners ===
Forster had three Grand National (Grade 3) winners. His first was in the 1972 Grand National with Well To Do. Forster had bought the unbroken three-year-old for just over £700 in 1966 on behalf of one of his chief racehorse owners, Heather Summer. When she died of cancer, she left him the choice of any of her horses in her will. Forster chose her favourite horse, Well To Do. When Well To Do won the Grand National, Forster became the first trainer and owner to win the race since the World War II.

Forster's second victory in the Grand National came with the American horse Ben Nevis II (1968–1995) in the 1980 Grand National. In the United Kingdom, the horse was known simply as Ben Nevis. Ben Nevis II was bred in England by A. S. Pattenden. The horse fell in his first two races but won his third start. This was enough for Ben Nevis II to be purchased by the American owner Redmond Stewart for US$6,900. Stewart moved the Ben Nevis over the United States to his son-in-law, Charlie Fenwick, Jnr to train. Ben Nevis II started racing in the United States in 1976 and won seven consecutive races included two victories in the Maryland Hunt Cup in 1977 and 1978 and five point-to-point events.

Ben Nevis II was sent to England to train with Forster for the 1979 Grand National, but fell at the 15th fence (The Chair). A year later in the 1980 Grand National Ben Nevis II, ridden by Charlie Fenwick Jnr, broke clear of the field to win by twenty lengths. It was Ben Nevis II's only victory in 12 starts in England. The horse became only the third American-based horse, along with Battleship and Jay Trump, to win the Grand National. Ben Nevis II retired after his victory with earnings of US$124,199. He lived the remainder of his life on Fenwick's farm back in Maryland, where he died in 1995 at the age of 27. Ben Nevis II was inducted into the America's National Museum of Racing's Hall of Fame in 2009.

Forster's third and final Grand National winner was Last Suspect, who was owned by the Duchess of Westminster. She had also owned Foinavon (winner of the 1967 Grand National, although she had sold Foinavon prior to his winning the Aintree Grand National] and Arkle (winner of the Cheltenham Gold Cup (1964, 1965, 1966). Last Suspect was said to be "moody, unreliable, disinterested". During the race at Warwick prior to the 1985 Grand National, the 11-year-old gelding pulled himself up. Forster and the Duchess of Westminster only ran him in the race at the insistence of his jockey Hywel Davies. Last Suspect won by 1 1/2 lengths in front of Mr Snugfit and the 1983 Grand National winner Corbiere coming in third.

=== Other racing achievements ===
Grade 1 winners trained by Tim Forster
Year	Race	Horse	Jockey
1973	Arkle Challenge Trophy	Denys Adventure	Graham Thorner
1976	King George VI Chase	Royal Marshall II	Graham Thorner
1985	Tingle Creek Chase	Lefrak City	Richard Dunwoody
1993	Tolworth Hurdle	Sun Surfer	Carl Llewellyn
1995	Victor Chandler Chase	Martha's Son	Rodney Farrant
1995	Ascot Chase	Martha's Son	Rodney Farrant
1997	Queen Mother Champion Chase	Martha's Son	Rodney Farrant
1997	Melling Chase	Martha's Son	Carl Llewellyn

Important Grade 2 and 3 winners trained by Tim Forster
Year	Race	Grade	Horse	Jockey
1974	Hennessy Gold Cup	III	Royal Marshall II	Graham Thorner
1986	Peterborough Chase	II	Western Sunset	Hywel Davies
1988	Mackeson Gold Cup	III	Pegwell Bay	Peter Scudamore
1988	A. F. Budge Gold Cup	III	Pegwell Bay	Brendan Powell
1990	Peterborough Chase	II	Pegwell Bay	Jamie Railton
1994	Peterborough Chase	II	Martha's Son	Rodney Farrant
1994	Tripleprint Gold Cup	III	Dublin Flyer	Brendan Powell
1995	Mackeson Gold Cup	III	Dublin Flyer	Brendan Powell
1996	Peterborough Chase	II	Dublin Flyer	Brendan Powell

Forster moved to Downton Hall Stables, 2 miles north of Ludlow on the Downton Hall estate in Shropshire in the summer of 1994. Forster retired with a full training licence in 1998 and ended winning his last race, a novice chase at Market Rasen on 30 May 1998 with Albermarle. He continued to train under permit and his last winner under Rules was Gill'mar at Leicester on 1 January 1999.

== Death ==
When Forster retired in 1998 he was suffering from a cancer of the bone marrow. He had also been fighting multiple sclerosis for a number of years. Forster had trained 1,346 winners in total on a full licence. He died in Ludlow, Shropshire on 21 April 1999.

== Awards ==
Forster received an Order of the British Empire ("OBE") in the 1999 New Year Honours List for services to Horse Racing, which were announced on 31 December 1998.

== See also ==
- List of race horse trainers
