= Frederick Wilson =

Frederick Wilson may refer to:

- Frederick Wilson (film editor) (1912–1994), British film editor and director
- Frederick Wilson (artist) (1858–1932), British stained glass artist
- Frederick Wilson (Raja) (1817–1883), British hunter, timber trader, and entrepreneur and settler in India, also sometime referred to Pahari Wilson or the Raja of Harsil
- Frederick William Wilson (1844–1924), British politician and newspaper owner
- Rick Wilson (political consultant) (born 1963), born Frederick Wilson, American political strategist, media consultant, and author

== See also ==
- Frederic Wilson (1881–1932), English sportsman and journalist
- Fred Wilson (disambiguation)
