= 1982 Grand National =

English steeplechase horse race

- Grand National
- Location: Aintree Racecourse
- Date: 3 April 1982
- Winning horse: Grittar
- Starting price: 7/1 F
- Jockey: Mr. Dick Saunders
- Trainer: Frank H Gilman
- Owner: Frank H Gilman
- Conditions: Good

External videos
- 1982 Grand National in full BBC Sport/YouTube
- 1982 Grand National in full BBC Sport/YouTube

And it's 48 year old Dick Saunders on Grittar from Hard Outlook. Grittar strides into the final furlong and is already being acclaimed as the National Hero of 1982. Frank Gilman's Grittar strides up to the line to win it in fantastic style, ear's pricked, he's a fresh horse, Grittar wins the National!

— BBC Commentator Peter O'Sullevan describes the climax of the 1982 National

The 1982 Grand National (officially known as The Sun Grand National for sponsorship reasons) was the 136th running of the Grand National horse race that took place at Aintree Racecourse near Liverpool, England, on 3 April 1982.

The race was won by 7/1 favourite Grittar, ridden by amateur Dick Saunders, who at the age of 48 became, and remains, the oldest jockey to have won the Grand National.

Saunders retired after the race and became chairman of the Aintree stewards. Grittar finished fifth in the next year's National and 10th in 1984. The horse retired to his owner's Rutland base and died aged 25.

The race was also notable for being the first in which a female jockey, Geraldine Rees, completed the course. She rode Cheers to be the eighth and last of the finishers.

== Leading contenders ==
Grittar was installed as a 7/1 favourite on the day of the race, due mostly to the Cheltenham and Liverpool Foxhunter Chase double in 1981 The victory at Liverpool was enough for him to get the support of BBC Radio 2 commentator, Peter Bromley though several newspaper pundits expressed concern at the horse's being a hunter chaser. Forty-eight-year-old amateur rider Dick Saunders told trainer Frank Gilman to employ the services of a professional rider, Peter Scudamore for the big race, but Gilman insisted Saunders take the ride if fit. His age and amateur status did little to deter the betting public although leading professional gambler, Alex Bird exclaimed "I immediately pencilled him in for the '82 National, but I'm not happy about the jockey - I'll be keeping my money in my pocket." In preparation for the National, he won at a canter at Leicester before finishing a creditable sixth in the Cheltenham Gold Cup.

== Finishing order ==
Position	Name	Jockey	Age	Weight	SP	Distance
01	Grittar	Mr Dick Saunders	9	11-5	7/1 F	Fifteen lengths
02	Hard Outlook	Anthony Webber	11	10-1	50/1	
03	Loving Words	Richard Hoare	9	10-11	16/1	
04	Delmoss	Bill Smith	12	10-3	50/1	
05	Current Gold	Neale Doughty	11	10-8	25/1	
06	Tragus	Peter Scudamore	10	11-4	14/1	
07	Three Of Diamonds	Mr Pat O'Connor	10	10-7	100/1	
08	Cheers	Mrs Geraldine Rees	10	10-0	66/1	Last to finish

== Non-finishers ==
Fence	Name	Jockey	Age	Weight	SP	Fate
01	Aldaniti	Bob Champion	12	11-9	12/1	Fell
01	Artistic Prince	Colin Brown	11	10-0	50/1	Fell
01	Cold Spell	Steve Jobar	10	10-0	40/1	Brought Down
01	Jimmy Miff	Mr Michael Williams	10	10-1	50/1	Fell
01	Man Alive	Andy Turnell	11	11-0	33/1	Fell
01	Mullacurry	Mr Tom Taaffe	10	10-12	16/1	Fell
01	Rambling Jack	Geordie Dun	11	11-1	16/1	Fell
01	Rathlek	Mr John Carden	12	10-12	100/1	Fell
01	Three To One	Ridley Lamb	11	10-3	12/1	Fell
01	Deep Gale	Tommy Ryan	9	11-2	22/1	Fell
03	Coolishall	Ron Barry	13	10-3	33/1	Fell
03	Deermount	JP Byrne	8	10-0	100/1	Fell
03	Martinstown	Miss Charlotte Brew	10	10-3	100/1	Unseated Rider
03	Sun Lion	Steve Smith-Eccles	12	10-3	50/1	Fell
06	Choral Festival	Mr Marcus Low	11	10-4	100/1	Unseated Rider
06	Peter Scot	Paul Barton	11	11-5	16/1	Fell
06	Royal Mail	Bob Davies	12	11-10	17/2	Fell
06	The Vintner	Mr Dermot Browne	11	10-7	50/1	Unseated Rider
08	Again The Same	Jonjo O'Neill	9	11-8	16/1	Pulled Up
08	This Way	Clive Candy	11	10-2	100/1	Fell
11	Old Society	P Walsh	8	10-8	33/1	Fell
11	Senator Maclacury	Pat Kiely	8	10-0	20/1	Fell
17	Good Prospect	Richard Linley	13	10-12	50/1	Refused
19	Royal Stuart	Mr Dennis Gray	11	10-4	40/1	Brought Down
22	Gandy VI	Niall Madden	13	10-8	50/1	Fell
22	Rough And Tumble	John Francome	12	10-8	16/1	Refused
22	Monty Python	Ben De Haan	10	10-0	66/1	Refused
22	Rolls Rambler	Mr Jim Wilson	11	10-12	20/1	Refused
22	Tiepolino	Hywel Davies	10	10-4	50/1	Refused
27	Carrow Boy	Gerry Newman	10	11-7	40/1	Fell
27	Saint Fillans	Phil Tuck	8	10-11	33/1	Fell

== Media coverage ==
BBC Grandstand covered the race with David Coleman fronting the coverage live from Aintree.
