= International cricket in 1905 =

International cricket season

The 1905 international cricket season was from April 1905 to August 1905. The season included the famous British Authors vs British Actors cricket match in England.

== Season overview ==
International tours
Start date	Home team	Away team	Results [Matches]			
Start date	Home team	Away team	Test	ODI	FC	LA
29 May 1905	England	Australia	2–0 [5]	—	—	—
29 June 1905	Authors	Actors	—	—	—	0–1 [1]
22 July 1905	Philadelphia	Marylebone	—	—	1–1 [2]	—

== May ==
=== Australia in England ===
The Ashes Test series
No.	Date	Home captain	Away captain	Venue	Result
Test 83	29–31 May	Stanley Jackson	Joe Darling	Trent Bridge, Nottingham	England by 213 runs
Test 84	15–17 June	Stanley Jackson	Joe Darling	Lord's, London	Match drawn
Test 85	3–5 July	Stanley Jackson	Joe Darling	Headingley Cricket Ground, Leeds	Match drawn
Test 86	24–26 July	Stanley Jackson	Joe Darling	Old Trafford Cricket Ground, Manchester	England by an innings and 80 runs
Test 87	14–16 August	Stanley Jackson	Joe Darling	Kennington Oval, London	Match drawn

== June ==
=== Actors vs Authors in England ===
One-day match
No.	Date	Home captain	Away captain	Venue	Result
Match	29 June	Arthur Conan Doyle	Aubrey Smith	Lord's, London	Actors by 7 wickets

== July ==
=== MCC in USA ===
First-class Series
No.	Date	Home captain	Away captain	Venue	Result
Match 1	22–25 July	John Lester	Eric Mann	Germantown Cricket Club Ground, Manheim	Marylebone by 7 wickets
Match 2	22–25 July	John Lester	Eric Mann	Merion Cricket Club Ground, Philadelphia	Gentlemen of Philadelphia by 61 runs
