= Grittar =

British-bred Thoroughbred racehorse (1973–1998)

- Sire: Grisaille
- Dam: Tarama
- Damsire: Tamerlane
- Sex: Gelding
- Foaled: 1973
- Country: United Kingdom
- Colour: Bay
- Breeder: Frank H Gilman
- Owner: Frank H Gilman
- Trainer: Frank H Gilman

Major wins
- Grand National (1982)

Grittar (1973–1998) was a British-bred Thoroughbred racehorse who competed in National Hunt racing.

In 1982 he won the Grand National as the 7/1 favourite being ridden by amateur jockey Dick Saunders, who at the age of 48 became, and remains, the oldest jockey to have won the Grand National.

== Background ==
Grittar was a bay gelding bred in the United Kingdom by Frank H Gilman. He was owned and trained by Gilman and resided in Rutland.

== Racing career ==
And it's 48 year old Dick Saunders on Grittar from Hard Outlook. Grittar strides into the final furlong and is already being acclaimed as the National Hero of 1982. Frank Gilman's Grittar strides up to the line to win it in fantastic style, ear's pricked, he's a fresh horse. Grittar wins the National!

— BBC Commentator Peter O'Sullevan describes the climax of the 1982 National

In 1981 Grittar won the Cheltenham and Liverpool Foxhunters and Gilman decided he should be entered in the National the following year.

In preparation for the National, he won at a canter at Leicester before finishing a creditable sixth in the Cheltenham Gold Cup.

Grittar was installed as a 7/1 favourite on the day of the 1982 Grand National race, due mostly to the Foxhunter Chase double in 1981. The victory at Liverpool was enough for him to get the support of BBC Radio 2 commentator, Peter Bromley though several newspaper pundits expressed concern at the horse being a hunter chaser. Forty-eight-year-old amateur rider Dick Saunders told trainer Frank Gilman to employ the services of a professional rider, Peter Scudamore for the big race, but Gilman insisted Saunders take the ride if fit. His age and amateur status did little to deter the betting public although leading professional gambler, Alex Bird commented "I immediately pencilled him in for the '82 National, but I'm not happy about the jockey - I'll be keeping my money in my pocket."

Grittar had a virtually trouble free run beating the other 7 finishers by 15 lengths with Saunders retiring immediately after the race and becoming chairman of the Aintree stewards.

Grittar ran in two more Nationals. In 1983 he finished 5th behind Corbiere and the following year ridden by John Francome he finished 10th to Hallo Dandy.

Grittar died aged 25 in Leicestershire.

== Grand National record ==
Grand National	Position	Jockey	Age	Weight	SP	Distance
1982	1st	Dick Saunders	9	11-5	7/1 F	Won by 15 lengths
1983	5th	Paul Barton	10	11-12	6/1	
1984	10th	John Francome	11	11-10	12/1	

== Pedigree ==
Pedigree of Grittar (GB), bay gelding, 1973
Sire Grisaille (GB) 1965	Grey Sovereign (GB); 1948	Nasrullah (GB)	Nearco (ITY)
Sire Grisaille (GB) 1965	Grey Sovereign (GB); 1948	Nasrullah (GB)	Mumtaz Begum
Sire Grisaille (GB) 1965	Grey Sovereign (GB); 1948	Kong (GB)	Baytown
Sire Grisaille (GB) 1965	Grey Sovereign (GB); 1948	Kong (GB)	Clang
Sire Grisaille (GB) 1965	Goyamora (FRA); 1954	Goyama (FRA)	Goya II
Sire Grisaille (GB) 1965	Goyamora (FRA); 1954	Goyama (FRA)	Devineress
Sire Grisaille (GB) 1965	Goyamora (FRA); 1954	Temora (FRA)	Tourbillon
Sire Grisaille (GB) 1965	Goyamora (FRA); 1954	Temora (FRA)	Pharyva
Dam Tarama (GB) 1965	Tamerlane (GB); 1952	Persian Gulf (GB)	Bahram (GB)
Dam Tarama (GB) 1965	Tamerlane (GB); 1952	Persian Gulf (GB)	Double Life (IRE)
Dam Tarama (GB) 1965	Tamerlane (GB); 1952	Eastern Empress (GB)	Nearco (ITY)
Dam Tarama (GB) 1965	Tamerlane (GB); 1952	Eastern Empress (GB)	Cheveley Lady
Dam Tarama (GB) 1965	Confection (GB); 1948	Fun Fair (GB)	Fair Trial (GB)
Dam Tarama (GB) 1965	Confection (GB); 1948	Fun Fair (GB)	Humoresque
Dam Tarama (GB) 1965	Confection (GB); 1948	Choclo (GB)	Blandford
Dam Tarama (GB) 1965	Confection (GB); 1948	Choclo (GB)	Athasi
