= Topham Chase =

Steeplechase horse race in Britain

- Class: Premier Handicap
- Location: Aintree Racecourse, Aintree, Merseyside, England
- Inaugurated: 1949
- Race type: Steeplechase
- Sponsor: Randox Health
- Website: www.thejockeyclub.co.uk/aintree/

Race information
- Distance: 2 miles 5 furlongs 19 yards (4,242 metres)
- Surface: Turf
- Qualification: Five-years-old and up
- Weight: Handicap; Maximum: 11 st 12 lb
- Purse: £150,000 (2022); 1st: £84,195

Topham Chase
2026
| Will The Wise | Ile Atlantique | Madara |

Previous years
2025
Gentleman De Mee | Lisnamult Lad | The Goffer
2024
Arizona Cardinal | James Du Berlais | Kandoo Kid
2023
Bill Baxter | Fantastic Lady | Killer Kane
2022
Mac Tottie | Batcio | Annamix
2021
Livelovelaugh | Pink Eyed Pedro | Senior Citizen

2020-2011
2019
Cadmium | Sub Lieutenant | Doitforthevillage
2018
Ultragold | Shanahan's Turn | Theatre Territory
2017
Ultragold | Katnap | Portrait King
2016
Eastlake | Fairy Rath | Third Intention
2015
Rajdhani Express | Fairy Rath | Rathlin
2014
Ma Filleule | Bennys Mist | Eastlake
2013
Triolo D'Alene | Walkon | Last Time D'albain
2012
Always Waining | Chance Du Roy | Fistral Beach
2011
Always Waining | Mon Parrain | Scotsirish

2010-2001
2010
Always Waining | Scotsirish | Isn't That Lucky
2009
Irish Raptor | Oodachee | Cossack Dancer
2008
Gwanako | Irish Raptor | Bothar Na
2007
Dunbrody Millar | Theatre Knight | Latimer's Place
2006
Liberthine | Hakim | Pak Jack
2005
Cregg House | Haut de Gamme | Le Duc
2004
Cassia Heights | Longshanks | Scotmail Boy
2003
Clan Royal | Macs Gildoran | Exit Swinger
2002
Its Time For A Win | Monty's Pass | Korakor
2001
Gower-Slave | Goguenard | Scotmail Boy

2000-1991
2000
Northern Starlight | Kings Cherry | Fourth In Line
1999
Listen Timmy | Linden's Lotto | Maitre De Musique
1998
Cyfor Malta | Ballyline | With Impunity
1997
Bells Life | Yeoman Warrior | Kadi
1996
Joe White | Go Universal | Mugoni Beach
1995
Dublin Flyer | Toureen Prince | River Bounty
1994
Indian Tonic | Kentish Piper | Sirrah Jay
1993
Sirrah Jay | Southern Minstrel | Nos Na Gaoithe
1992
The Antartex | Captain Mor | Strong Gold
1991
J-J-Henry | The Antartex | Tom Caxton

1990-1988
1990
Wont Be Gone Long | Villierstown | Golden Minstrel
1989
Villierstown | Eton Rouge | Red Columbia
1988
Wiggburn | Pan Arctic | Villierstown

The Topham Chase is a Premier Handicap National Hunt handicap chase in England which is open to horses aged five years or older. It is run at Aintree over a distance of about 2 miles and 5 furlongs (2 miles 5 furlongs and 19 yards, or 4,242 metres), and it is scheduled to take place each year in April.

From 1989 to 2001 the race was named to commemorate the late clerk of the course John Hughes.

In April 2012 the race was won for the third consecutive year by Always Waining, trained by Peter Bowen and ridden by Tom O'Brien.

== History ==
The inaugural running of the Topham was in 1949. The Topham is now one of three races run over the Grand National fences at the Aintree Festival, the other two races being the Foxhunters' Chase for amateur jockeys and the Grand National itself. The Topham Chase is currently run on the second day of the meeting.

== Records ==
Most successful horse (3 wins):

- Always Waining – 2010, 2011, 2012

Leading jockey (3 wins):

- Richard Dunwoody – Glenrue (1986), Won't Be Gone Long (1990), The Antartex (1992)
- Barry Geraghty – Triolo D'Alene (2013), Ma Filleule (2014), Eastlake (2016)

Leading trainer (5 wins):

- Nicky Henderson - Won't Be Gone Long (1990), Liberthine (2006), Triolo D'Alene (2013), Ma Filleule (2014), Rajdhani (2015)
- Peter Bowen - Dunbrody Millar (2007), Always Waining (2010, 2011, 2012), Mac Tottie (2022)

== Winners ==
| Year | Winner | Age | Weight | Jockey | Trainer |
|---|---|---|---|---|---|
| 1949 | Cadamstown | 9 | 11-04 | Jimmy Brogan | J Powell |
| 1950 | Culworth | 9 | 10-12 | Dick Curran | W (Charlie) Hall |
| 1951 | Culworth | 10 | 11-06 | Dick Curran | W (Charlie) Hall |
| 1952 | Ballymagillan | 6 | 10-09 | Pat Taaffe | Tom Dreaper (Ir) |
| 1953 | Irish Lizard | 10 | 10-04 | Dick Francis | Frenchie Nicholson |
| 1954 | Little Yid | 12 | 10-11 | George Slack | Bobby Renton |
| 1955 | Stormhead | 11 | 11-12 | Paddy Farrell | W (Charlie) Hall |
| 1956 | John Jacques | 9 | 10-08 | Jimmy Power | Walter Wharton |
| 1957 | Roughan | 10 | 11-00 | Harry East | Neville Crump |
| 1958 | Roughan | 11 | 11-02 | Fred Winter | Neville Crump |
| 1959 | Clanyon | 11 | 11-04 | Grenville Underwood | W Johns-Powell |
| 1960 | Fresh Winds | 9 | 11-01 | Stan Mellor | Roy Whiston |
| 1961 | Cupid's Charge | 6 | 11-03 | Bill Rees | Peter Cazalet |
| 1962 | Dagmar Gittell | 7 | 10-11 | Josh Gifford | Bobby Renton |
| 1963 | Barberyn | 8 | 11-09 | Michael Scudamore | W (Arthur) Stephenson |
| 1964 | Red Tide | 7 | 10-06 | Jeff King | Bob Turnell |
| 1965 | Hopkiss | 7 | 10-12 | E P Harty | Alec Kilpatrick |
| 1966 | Walpole | 10 | 11-05 | Josh Gifford | Ryan Price |
| 1967 | Georgetown | 7 | 10-07 | P Mahoney | Noel Kusbish |
| 1968 | Surcharge | 10 | 10-08 | S Davenport | John Barclay |
| 1969 | Dozo | 8 | 10-05 | Eddie Harty | Toby Balding |
| 1970 | Charter Flight | 8 | 11-12 | Johnny Haine | Bob Turnell |
| 1971 | Rigton Prince | 10 | 11-01 | John Enright | W (Arthur) Stephenson |
| 1972 | Sunny Lad | 8 | 10-08 | Ken White | Fred Rimell |
| 1973 | Inch Arran | 9 | 11-02 | David Mould | Peter Cazalet |
| 1974 | Clear Cut | 10 | 11-08 | Jonjo O'Neill | W (Charlie) Hall |
| 1975 | Our Greenwood | 7 | 12-00 | Tommy Carberry | Jim Dreaper (Ir) |
| 1976 | Lictor | 9 | 10-00 | David Sunderland | Edward Courage |
| 1977 | Churchtown Boy | 10 | 10-00 | Chris Read | Taffy Salaman |
| 1978 | Canit | 8 | 10-00 | Colin Tinkler | Fred Rimell |
| 1979 | Artic Ale | 8 | 10-08 | John Fowler (Note: amateur jockey) | Dan Moore (Ir) |
| 1980 | Uncle Bing | 11 | 11-11 | John Francome | Richard Head |
| 1981 | Mr Marlsbridge | 8 | 10-10 | Paul Barton | David Gandolfo |
| 1982 | Beacon Time | 8 | 10-09 | Kevin Mooney | Fulke Walwyn |
| 1983 | Tiepolino | 11 | 10-04 | Hywel Davies | Kevin Bishop |
| 1984 | Fabulous | 11 | 10-00 | Andrew Stringer | J S Wilson |
| 1985 | Smith's Man | 7 | 10-00 | Mark Perrett | Jenny Pitman |
| 1986 | Glenrue | 9 | 10-02 | Richard Dunwoody | Terry Casey |
| 1987 | Strath Leader | 9 | 11-10 | Tom Morgan | John Edwards |
| 1988 | Wiggburn | 9 | 10-02 | Mike Williams | Anne Hewitt |
| 1989 | Villierstown | 10 | 11-10 | Simon Sherwood | W (Arthur) Stephenson |
| 1990 | Wont Be Gone Long | 8 | 11-07 | Richard Dunwoody | Nicky Henderson |
| 1991 | J-J-Henry | 12 | 10-10 | Anthea Farrell | Peter Beaumont |
| 1992 | The Antartex | 9 | 10-02 | Richard Dunwoody | Gordon W. Richards |
| 1993 | Sirrah Jay | 13 | 10-00 | Adrian Maguire | Toby Balding |
| 1994 | Indian Tonic | 8 | 10-04 | Chris Maude | Nigel Twiston-Davies |
| 1995 | Dublin Flyer | 9 | 12-00 | Brendan Powell Snr | Tim Forster |
| 1996 | Joe White | 10 | 11-00 | Paul Carberry | Howard Johnson |
| 1997 | Bells Life | 8 | 11-04 | Glen Tormey | Philip Hobbs |
| 1998 | Cyfor Malta | 5 | 11-01 | Tony McCoy | Martin Pipe |
| 1999 | Listen Timmy | 10 | 11-08 | Tony Dobbin | Steve Brookshaw |
| 2000 | Northern Starlight | 9 | 11-05 | Tony McCoy | Martin Pipe |
| 2001 | Gower-Slave | 9 | 10-07 | Richard Johnson | Philip Hobbs |
| 2002 | Its Time For A Win | 10 | 10-12 | Ruby Walsh | Willie Mullins |
| 2003 | Clan Royal | 8 | 10-02 | Liam Cooper | Jonjo O'Neill |
| 2004 | Cassia Heights | 9 | 10-00 | Jim Culloty | Steve Brookshaw |
| 2005 | Cregg House | 10 | 10-05 | Davy Russell | Shane Donohoe |
| 2006 | Liberthine | 7 | 10-04 | Sam Waley-Cohen | Nicky Henderson |
| 2007 | Dunbrody Millar | 9 | 10-00 | Jamie Moore | Peter Bowen |
| 2008 | Gwanako | 5 | 11-08 | Ruby Walsh | Paul Nicholls |
| 2009 | Irish Raptor | 10 | 10-00 | Paddy Brennan | Nigel Twiston-Davies |
| 2010 | Always Waining | 9 | 10-00 | Brian Hughes | Peter Bowen |
| 2011 | Always Waining | 10 | 10-04 | Tom O'Brien | Peter Bowen |
| 2012 | Always Waining | 11 | 10-11 | Tom O'Brien | Peter Bowen |
| 2013 | Triolo D'Alene | 6 | 10-07 | Barry Geraghty | Nicky Henderson |
| 2014 | Ma Filleule | 6 | 11-07 | Barry Geraghty | Nicky Henderson |
| 2015 | Rajdhani Express | 8 | 11-08 | Sam Waley-Cohen | Nicky Henderson |
| 2016 | Eastlake | 10 | 10-11 | Barry Geraghty | Jonjo O'Neill |
| 2017 | Ultragold | 9 | 10-05 | Harry Cobden | Colin Tizzard |
| 2018 | Ultragold | 10 | 11-01 | Harry Cobden | Colin Tizzard |
| 2019 | Cadmium | 7 | 11-01 | Paul Townend | Willie Mullins |
| | no race 2020 (Note: The 2020 running was cancelled because of the COVID-19 pandemic in the United Kingdom) |
| 2021 | Livelovelaugh | 11 | 11-00 | Patrick Mullins | Willie Mullins |
| 2022 | Mac Tottie | 9 | 10-00 | Sean Bowen | Peter Bowen |
| 2023 | Bill Baxter | 7 | 10-04 | Sam Twiston-Davies | Warren Greatrex |
| 2024 | Arizona Cardinal | 8 | 10-10 | Ciaran Gethings | Stuart Edmunds |
| 2025 | Gentleman De Mee | 9 | 11-11 | Mark Walsh | Willie Mullins |
| 2026 | Will The Wise | 7 | 10-08 | Conor Stone-Walsh | Gavin Cromwell |

== See also ==
- Horse racing in Great Britain
- List of British National Hunt races
