= James Marsh (cricketer) =

English cricketer and clergyman

Personal information
- Full name: James William Marsh
- Born: 16 October 1870; Thame, Oxfordshire, England
- Died: 26 March 1930 (aged 59); Ludlow, Shropshire, England
- Batting: Right-handed
- Role: Wicket-keeper
- Relatives: Frederick Marsh (brother)

Domestic team information
- Years: Team
- 1898–1906: Oxfordshire
- 1901–1903: Cambridge University

Career statistics
Competition	First-class
Matches	8
Runs scored	145
Batting average	11.15
100s/50s	–/–
Top score	29*
Catches/stumpings	5/5
- Source: Cricinfo, 19 June 2022

James William Marsh (16 October 1870 – 26 March 1930) was an English clergyman and a cricketer who played in first-class cricket matches for Cambridge University and amateur teams between 1901 and 1907. He was born at Thame, Oxfordshire and died at Ludlow, Shropshire.

Marsh was educated at Amersham Hall School, Reading, and at Jesus College, Cambridge, where, unusually, he was in his late 20s by the time of his matriculation in 1900. As a cricketer, he was a lower-order right-handed batsman and a wicketkeeper, and he had already played a single Minor Counties game for Oxfordshire County Cricket Club before he arrived in Cambridge. During his time at Cambridge University, Marsh was unable to secure a regular spot in the first cricket team, and as a result, he did not participate in the annual University Match against Oxford University during any of his three years there. His younger brother Frederick, who was contemporary with him at Jesus College but then remained for a fourth year in 1904, was even less favoured by the cricket selectors in the years that James was at the university, appearing only in trial matches from 1901 to 1903. However, Frederick did eventually achieve selection in 1904 and went on to break the record for the highest individual score in the University Match.

James Marsh played for Oxfordshire in the Minor Counties Championship, representing them regularly from 1901 to 1906. However, after leaving the university, he only played in one more first-class match which was an end-of-season game against the 1907 South Africans.

Marsh graduated from Cambridge University in 1903 with a Bachelor of Arts degree. He was ordained as a deacon in the Church of England in 1904 and as a priest the following year. He had an itinerant clerical career, being successively at Oakham, Rutland and Knighton, Leicester as a curate, then vicar at Belgrave, Leicester and rector at Kings Cliffe, Northamptonshire, and finally reverting to curate status at Bitterley, Shropshire.
