= 1983 Grand National =

Horse race held in 1983

- Grand National
- Location: Aintree Racecourse
- Date: 9 April 1983
- Winning horse: (England) Corbiere
- Starting price: 13/1
- Jockey: (England) Ben de Haan
- Trainer: (England) Jenny Pitman
- Owner: Bryan Burrough
- Conditions: Soft

External videos
- 1983 Grand National in full – BBC Sport/YouTube
- 1983 Grand National in full – BBC Sport/YouTube
- Replay of the latter stages of the 1983 Grand National – BBC Sport

And it's Corbiere with a furlong to run in the National, being pressed by Greasepaint. Corbiere from Greasepaint, Greasepaint putting in a tremendous run for Ireland, ridden by Mr Colin Magnier. It's Greasepaint on the nearside, beginning to get up as they race towards the line. It's Corbiere from Greasepaint, and Corbiere's won it!

— BBC commentator Peter O'Sullevan describing the climax of the 1983 Grand National

The 1983 Grand National (officially known as the 1983 The Sun Grand National for sponsorship reasons) was the 137th renewal of the Grand National horse race, which took place at Aintree Racecourse near Liverpool, England, on 9 April 1983.

The race was won by Corbiere, who became the first Grand National winner trained by a female horse trainer, Jenny Pitman. The winning jockey was Ben de Haan.

The favourite in the 41-strong field was the previous year's winner, Grittar, at odds of 7/1. Approaching Valentine's, the 23rd fence, Corbiere held a four-length lead over his nearest challenger, Greasepaint. At the finishing post, Corbiere held off Greasepaint by three-quarters of a length. Yer Man finished third.

Corbiere went on to finish third in the next two Grand Nationals. He fell in his fourth consecutive National and finished 12th in his fifth and final appearance in the 1987 race.

== Race Card ==
Many long-time ante-post bets had already been lost on the eve of the race when top weight and ante-post favorite, Ashley House, was withdrawn due to the expected heavy ground. Last year's winner, Grittar, was then installed as both joint top weight and the 6/1 favorite, despite a disrupted preparation that saw him race just twice all season without distinction. Champion jockey John Francome was initially booked to ride but was ruled out due to injury, with Paul Barton taking over the ride. Grittar's former jockey, Dick Saunders, had retired.

Barton kept the favorite in the front rank throughout the race, surviving a jumping error at the fence before Becher's Brook on the second circuit to remain in contention, never more than a few lengths behind the leader. However, an injection of pace towards the penultimate fence saw the four horses ahead of him pull away, and Grittar was unable to stay with them, eventually fading to finish a distant fifth.

Bonum Omen was a well-supported contender among racing experts, carrying less than eleven stone and showing strong form over long distances during the winter. However, his jumping ability was a concern. Ridden by Kevin Mooney, he was never able to get into the race and was well behind by the time other horses stopped in front of him, causing him to refuse at the twentieth fence.

Spartan Missile, who had finished second in the 1981 Grand National but subsequently suffered a serious injury, had impressed backers with a win at Newbury earlier in the year. Following the death of his former jockey, John Thorne, in a 1982 riding accident, Hywel Davies took the ride. The pair raced in the middle to rear of the field but were still in contention before falling at Becher's Brook on the second circuit.

Peaty Sandy, a former Welsh National winner, had finished third in that race the previous Christmas. His reputation ensured he went off at 12/1, making him the best-backed horse ever trained by a woman at the time. Ridden by T.G. Dun, he was never a factor, jumping Becher's Brook at the rear of the field on the second circuit. However, he passed tired horses in the closing stages to finish a distant sixth.

Corbiere, trained by Jenny Pitman, had narrowly won the Welsh Grand National in December. Further success at Doncaster and a strong second-place finish at the Cheltenham Festival justified his 13/1 starting price. Ridden by Ben de Haan, Corbiere raced prominently from the start, sharing the lead with Hallo Dandy between the 20th and 28th fences before pulling ahead. Taking a clear lead from the penultimate fence, Corbiere appeared to have the race won at The Elbow but had to fend off a late surge from Greasepaint, ultimately holding on for victory.

The narrowly beaten Greasepaint was the best-supported Irish entry at 14/1, having won the Kim Muir Chase at the recent Cheltenham Festival. Amateur jockey Colin Magnier, one of thirteen riders making their Grand National debut, timed his late run well but just fell short, finishing second.

Mid Day Gun, also sent off at 14/1, was ridden by another debutant, Graham McCourt, after two strong performances in the build-up. However, his National experience ended abruptly at the first fence.

Keengaddy, who had finished second in the previous year's Topham Chase, was considered to be in excellent form and was sent off at 15/1. He jumped freely and was moving towards the front of the field when he was carried out at the Canal Turn. He continued in the race for three more fences before eventually falling.

Other notable contenders included Fortina's Express, ridden by Peter Scudamore; Pilot Officer, the Welsh National runner-up; Beacon Time, the previous year's Topham Chase winner; and Three To One, who had placed third in a previous Grand National and was also a Scottish Grand National runner-up.

== Finishing order ==
Position	Name	Jockey	Age	Weight	SP	Distance
01	Corbiere	Ben De Haan	8	11-04	13/1	Won by ¾ length
02	Greasepaint	Colin Magnier	8	10-7	14/1	
03	Yer Man	Val O'Connell	8	10-0	80/1	
04	Hallo Dandy	Neale Doughty	9	10-1	60/1	
05	Grittar	Paul Barton	10	11-12	6/1	
06	Peaty Sandy	Geordie Dunn	9	11-3	12/1	
07	Political Pop	Graham Bradley	9	11-3	28/1	
08	Venture to Cognac	Oliver Sherwood	10	11-12	28/1	
09	Colonel Christy	Philip Hobbs	8	10-0	66/1	
10	Delmoss	Bill Smith	13	10-3	50/1	Last to finish

== Non-finishers ==
Fence	Name	Jockey	Age	Weight	SP	Fate
01	Mid Day Gun	Graham McCourt	9	10-8	14/1	Fell
01	Midday Welcome	Geraldine Rees	12	10-0	500/1	Fell
01	Tower Moss	Richard Rowe	10	10-1	300/1	Fell
03 (open ditch)	That's It	Gordon Holmes	9	10-0	200/1	Unseated
04	Mender	Anthony Webber	12	10-1	50/1	Fell
06 (Becher's Brook)	Beech King	Mr P Duggan	9	10-8	60/1	Hampered & Unseated
06 (Becher's Brook)	King Spruce	Joy Carrier	9	11-4	28/1	Hampered & Unseated
06 (Becher's Brook)	Royal Mail	Tim Thomson-Jones	13	11-4	50/1	Fell
06 (Becher's Brook)	Three To One	Phil Tuck	12	10-2	25/1	Fell
08 (Canal Turn)	Duncreggan	Gerry McGlinchley	10	10-0	75/1	Fell fatally
11 (open ditch)	Keengaddy	Steve Smith-Eccles	10	10-0	15/1	Fell
15 (The Chair)	Arrigle Boy	Chris Pimlott	11	10-1	100/1	Refused
15 (The Chair)	Monty Python	P O'Brien	11	10-2	150/1	Refused
15 (The Chair)	O'er The Border	Pat O'Connor	9	10-12	200/1	Refused
15 (The Chair)	Pilot Officer	Sam Morshead	8	10-7	22/1	Unseated
15 (The Chair)	Sydney Quinn	Peter Double	11	10-0	300/1	Refused
15 (The Chair)	Williamson	Charlie Mann	9	10-0	100/1	Brought Down
16 (Water Jump)	Oakprime	Richard Linley	8	10-5	66/1	Pulled Up
17	Canford Ginger	James Davies	8	10-0	33/1	Brought Down {15} Remounted & Pulled Up
19 (open ditch)	Carrow Boy	Gerry Newman	11	10-12	33/1	Fell
19 (open ditch)	Menford	Mark Perret	8	10-0	100/1	Refused
19 (open ditch)	The Vintner	Chris Grant	12	10-0	66/1	Refused
19 (open ditch)	Artistic Prince	Colin Brown	12	10-0	66/1	Refused
20	Beacon Time	Jonjo O'Neill	9	10-6	25/1	Pulled Up
20	Bonum Omen	Kevin Mooney	9	10-9	15/2	Refused
20	The Lady's Master	Mr Willie Mullins	12	11-2	200/1	Ran Out
22 (Becher's Brook)	Spartan Missile	Hywel Davies	11	11-7	9/1	Unseated Rider
22 (Becher's Brook)	Tacroy	Frank Berry	9	11-9	33/1	Pulled Up
26	Fortina's Express	Peter Scudamore	9	10-3	20/1	Pulled Up
27 (open ditch)	Never Tamper	John Williams	8	10-0	500/1	Refused
30	Hot Tomato	John Burke	11	10-2	100/1	Fell

== Media coverage and aftermath ==
The BBC broadcast the race live on television for the twenty-fourth consecutive year as part of its regular Saturday afternoon Grandstand programme. The programme was hosted by David Coleman, who had presented all but two of the previous twenty-three National broadcasts. For the twelfth consecutive year, the commentary team consisted of John Hanmer, Julian Wilson, and lead commentator Peter O'Sullevan, who was calling his thirty-eighth Grand National on radio or television. The race was also broadcast live on BBC Radio for the fifty-third consecutive renewal as part of Radio Two's Sport on Two Saturday afternoon sports programme. The BBC also aired a short late-evening highlights programme on BBC1, presented by Julian Wilson.

Although the race was sponsored by the national newspaper The Sun, most other major national and regional newspapers continued to publish their own race cards in their Friday evening or Saturday editions. For the major newspapers, this created the dilemma of having to mention a rival publication when referring to the race as The Sun Grand National.
