= 1980 Grand National =

English steeplechase horse race

- Grand National
- Location: Aintree
- Date: 29 March 1980
- Winning horse: (England) Ben Nevis
- Starting price: 40/1
- Jockey: (United States) Charlie Fenwick
- Trainer: (England) Tim Forster
- Owner: (England) R.C. Stewart Jnr
- Conditions: Heavy

External videos
- 1980 Grand National in full BBC Sport/YouTube

And it's Ben Nevis getting tremendous American cheers here, here's a historic triumph here, the second American amateur to win the National since the war. He's coming up to the line the comfortable winner, Ben Nevis, trained by Tim Foster, who trained the winner with Well To Do, and he's won the National, Ben Nevis Wins the National.

— BBC commentator Peter O'Sullevan describes the climax of the race

The 1980 Grand National (officially known as The Sun Grand National for sponsorship reasons) was the 134th renewal of the Grand National horse race that took place at Aintree Racecourse near Liverpool, England, on 29 March 1980. The race, which carried the title, the World's greatest steeplechase, was won by Ben Nevis, ridden by the American amateur rider Charlie Fenwick. Only 4 horses finished the race out of 30 starters.

== Finishing order ==
Position	Name	Jockey	Age	Weight	SP	Distance
01	Ben Nevis	Mr. Charlie Fenwick	12	10-12	40/1	20 lengths
02	Rough and Tumble	John Francome	10	10-11	11/1	10 lengths
03	The Pilgarlic	Ron Hyett	12	10-4	33/1	15 lengths
04	Royal Stuart	Philip Blacker	9	10-10	20/1	Last to complete

== Non-finishers ==
Fence	Horse	Jockey	Age	Weight (st-lb)	SP	Fate
01	Mannyboy	Richard Rowe	10	10-2	33/1	Unseated rider
01	Salkeld	Colin Hawkins	8	10-0	20/1	Fell
03	Coolishall	Broderick Munro-Wilson	11	10-10	40/1	Unseated rider
03	Jer	Phil Tuck	9	10-4	10/1	Fell
03	Churchtown Boy	Andy Turnell	13	10-0	50/1	Fell
06	Another Dolly	Jonjo O'Neill	10	10-10	12/1	Fell
06	So and So	Richard Linley	11	10-10	28/1	Fell
15	Rubstic	Maurice Barnes	11	10-11	8/1	Fell
17	The Vintner	Bob Davies	9	10-8	16/1	Pulled Up
18	Even Up	Anthony Webber	13	10-6	50/1	Refused
19	Casamayor	Jeff King	10	10-12	50/1	Unseated rider
19	Drumroan	Tommy McGivern	12	10-5	22/1	Unseated rider
19	Godfrey Secundus	Sam Morshead	10	10-0	20/1	Pulled up
19	Kinivie	John Williams	11	10-0	100/1	Unseated rider
19	Levanka	Frank Berry	11	10-4	100/1	Pulled up
19	Prince Rock	Tommy Carmody	12	11-0	12/1	Unseated rider
19	Sandwillan	Jenny Hembrow	12	10-0	100/1	Refused
20	Zongalero	Steve Smith-Eccles	10	10-13	11/1	Refused
22	Delmoss	Gerry Newman	10	10-2	25/1	Fell
22	Jimmy Miff	Alan Brown	8	10-5	50/1	Fell
22	Three To One	Geordie Dun	9	10-2	25/1	Fell
23	Our Greenwood	Aiden O'Connell	12	11-6	100/1	Fell
24	Flashy Boy	Chris Grant	12	10-8	50/1	Fell
27	Dromore	Peter Duggan	12	10-8	100/1	Refused
27	Rathlek	Paul Barton	10	10-0	35/1	Refused
27	Royal Frolic	John Burke	11	11-4	16/1	Refused

== Media coverage ==
The twenty-first Grand National covered live on the BBC in a Grandstand special presented by David Coleman.
