= Hallo Dandy =

British-bred Thoroughbred racehorse (1974–2007)

- Sire: Menelek
- Dam: Dandy Hall
- Damsire: Last Of The Dandies
- Sex: Gelding
- Foaled: 1974
- Country: United Kingdom
- Colour: Bay
- Owner: Richard Shaw
- Trainer: Gordon W. Richards

Major wins
- Grand National (1984)

Hallo Dandy (1974 – 8 January 2007) was a British-bred Thoroughbred racehorse who competed in National Hunt racing.

He raced in 4 Grand Nationals (1983, 1984, 1985, 1986) winning the 1984 race.

He is also known for being discovered in 1994, many years after his retirement, in very poor health highlighting and raising awareness of neglect in ex-racehorses.

== Racing career ==
And it's Greasepaint on the far side, Hallo Dandy on the nearside, there's nothing between them as they come to the line. Hallo Dandy on the nearside is just gonna win it, Hallo Dandy has won it!

— BBC Commentator Peter O'Sullevan describes the climax of the 1984 National

Hallo Dandy won the 1984 Grand National, ridden by Welsh jockey Neale Doughty. The pairing had finished fourth in the previous year's National.

Before the race he had been a freely available 33/1 chance for the race at the start of 1984, having been pulled up in the Hennessey Cognac Gold Cup but was the subject of huge gambles when the handicapper seemed to have completely underestimated him by raising him just 1 lb in the weights to run carrying ten stones 2 lbs. A good prep race at Ayr and conditions at Aintree suggesting the horse would get the good ground he favoured, as opposed to the soft ground upon which he had tired to finish fourth last year only served to enhance his chances with his backers who sent him off at 13/1.

By the 26th fence Hallo Dandy and last year's runner-up Greasepaint were contesting the lead, which Hallo Dandy took at the second-last and held on to, securing victory by a distance of four lengths. The 1983 winner Corbiere finished third.

He ran in the next two Nationals, falling at the first in 1985 and finishing twelfth in 1986 at the age of 12. He was then retired from racing.

== Post-racing career ==
Following his retirement from racing Hallo Dandy was loaned to the Earl of Onslow, who rode him to hounds with the Fernie Hunt in Leicestershire. However at the age of 20 Hallo Dandy was turned out in a field on Onslow's Surrey estate.

In 1994 he was discovered in a very poor condition and suffering from neglect. The owner, Richard Shaw, took Hallo Dandy back and gifted him to the British Thoroughbred Retraining Centre (BTRC) who nursed him back to health and he became a champion for the welfare of ex-racehorses.

He died in January 2007 at the age of 33.

== Grand National record ==
Grand National	Position	Jockey	Age	Weight	SP	Distance
1983	4th	Neale Doughty	9	10-1	60/1	
1984	1st	Neale Doughty	10	10-2	13/1	Won by 4 lengths
1985	DNF	Graham Bradley	11	10-12	14/1	Unseated rider at fence 1
1986	12th	Neale Doughty	12	10-8	16/1	

== Pedigree ==
Pedigree of Hallo Dandy (GB), bay gelding, 1974
Sire Menelek (IRE) 1957	Tulyar (IRE); 1949	Tehran (GB)	Bois Roussel (FRA)
Sire Menelek (IRE) 1957	Tulyar (IRE); 1949	Tehran (GB)	Stafaralla (FRA)
Sire Menelek (IRE) 1957	Tulyar (IRE); 1949	Neocracy (GB)	Nearco (ITY)
Sire Menelek (IRE) 1957	Tulyar (IRE); 1949	Neocracy (GB)	Harina (IRE)
Sire Menelek (IRE) 1957	Queen of Sheba (GB); 1948	Persian Gulf (GB)	Bahram (GB)
Sire Menelek (IRE) 1957	Queen of Sheba (GB); 1948	Persian Gulf (GB)	Double Life (IRE)
Sire Menelek (IRE) 1957	Queen of Sheba (GB); 1948	Ojala (IRE)	Buen Ojo (ARG)
Sire Menelek (IRE) 1957	Queen of Sheba (GB); 1948	Ojala (IRE)	Dursilla (GB)
Dam Dandy Hall (IRE) 1954	Last of the Dandies (GB); 1927	D'Orsay (GB)	Son-in-law (GB)
Dam Dandy Hall (IRE) 1954	Last of the Dandies (GB); 1927	D'Orsay (GB)	My Dame (GB)
Dam Dandy Hall (IRE) 1954	Last of the Dandies (GB); 1927	Bill and Coo (GB)	William the Third (GB)
Dam Dandy Hall (IRE) 1954	Last of the Dandies (GB); 1927	Bill and Coo (GB)	Coo-Ee (GB)
Dam Dandy Hall (IRE) 1954	Overjoy (GB); 1938	Alishah (GB)	Tetratema (GB)
Dam Dandy Hall (IRE) 1954	Overjoy (GB); 1938	Alishah (GB)	Teresina (GB)
Dam Dandy Hall (IRE) 1954	Overjoy (GB); 1938	Under Thirty (GB)	Nothing Venture (GB)
Dam Dandy Hall (IRE) 1954	Overjoy (GB); 1938	Under Thirty (GB)	Austin (GB)
