= Frederick Marsh (cricketer) =

English cricketer

Personal information
- Full name: John Frederick Marsh
- Born: 11 May 1875; Thame, Oxfordshire, England
- Died: 30 October 1927 (aged 52); Higham on the Hill, Leicestershire, England
- Batting: Right-handed
- Role: Opening batsman
- Relatives: Brother, James

Domestic team information
- Years: Team
- 1897–1906: Oxfordshire
- 1904: Cambridge University
- First-class debut: 12 May 1904 Cambridge University v Yorkshire
- Last First-class: 9 July 1904 Cambridge University v Warwickshire

Career statistics
Competition	First-class
Matches	8
Runs scored	548
Batting average	42.15
100s/50s	2/2
Top score	172*
Balls bowled	24
Wickets	–
Bowling average	–
5 wickets in innings	–
10 wickets in match	–
Best bowling	0-18
Catches/stumpings	7/–
- Source: CricketArchive, 24 September 2017

John Frederick Marsh (11 May 1875 – 30 October 1927) was an English cricketer who played in eight first-class cricket matches for Cambridge University in 1904. His unbeaten 172 in the second innings of the 1904 University Match was the highest score in the fixture at the time. He was born at Thame, Oxfordshire and died at Higham on the Hill, Leicestershire.

Marsh was educated at Amersham Hall school and at Jesus College, Cambridge. As a cricketer he was a right-handed opening batsman and he had made his debut for Oxfordshire County Cricket Club in minor matches in 1892, playing regularly in the county's Minor Counties matches from 1897. He was described in his obituary in Wisden Cricketers' Almanack as "a batsman with a dogged defence and no pretensions to style". He was 25 years old before he went to Cambridge University and played in the freshmen's trial match in 1901, scoring 98 in the second innings, but then failed to be selected for any games except trial matches at Cambridge for the next three seasons. In 1904, however, having made a century in a trial match for the university side, Marsh finally made his first-class debut and in his third game, the match against the London County Cricket Club, W. G. Grace's team, he scored 118 in the second innings. That led to his selection for the 1904 University Match against Oxford University, where he proved to be a successful but controversial player. In the second Cambridge innings, Marsh made an unbeaten 172, the highest score in the history of the University Match, beating by one run the 171 made by Tip Foster in 1900. The decision by Cambridge captain Frederic Wilson to delay the second innings declaration to enable Marsh to beat the record was widely criticised as the match then ended in a draw. Wisden Cricketers' Almanack wrote that the delay "was clearly a mistake" and that "the chance of winning the match should have outweighed all considerations of personal distinction", though it added that rain and missed catches had also contributed to Cambridge's failure to win.

Marsh played no further first-class cricket after leaving Cambridge University in the summer of 1904, and his appearances for Oxfordshire tailed off by 1906. He became a schoolmaster at Rossall School – where he was joined fleetingly by his Cambridge cricket captain, Wilson, who soon left to become a sports journalist; Marsh remained at Rossall until 1915.
