= 1972 Grand National =

English steeplechase horse race

- Grand National
- Location: Aintree
- Date: 8 April 1972
- Winning horse: Well To Do
- Jockey: Graham Thorner
- Trainer: Capt Tim Forster
- Owner: Capt Tim Forster
- Conditions: Good to Soft

External videos
- The 1972 Grand National in full (BBC)
- Highlights of the 1972 Grand National, along with 1970 and 1971 BBC Sport

The 1972 Grand National was the 126th renewal of the Grand National horse race that took place at Aintree near Liverpool, England, on 8 April 1972.
The winner was Well To Do, whose price went down from 33–1 to 14-1 the day before. Former winner Gay Trip was second, and there was a dead-heat for third place.

The winning colours of Capt Tim Forster were - crimson, gold sleeves, hooped cap.

== Finishing order ==
Position	Name	Jockey	Age	Handicap (st-lb)	SP	Distance
01	Well To Do	Graham Thorner	9	10-1	14/1	
02	Gay Trip	Terry Biddlecombe	10	11-9	12/1	
03	Black Secret	Sean Barker	8	11-2	14/1	
03	General Symons	Pat Kiely	9	10-0	40/1	
05	Astbury	Jimmy Bourke	9	10-0	25/1	
06	Specify	Barry Brogan	10	10-11	22/1	
07	Bright Willow	Bill Smith	11	10-1	28/1	
08	Money Boat	Frank Berry	8	10-3	16/1	
09	Rough Silk	David Nicholson	9	10-6	25/1	Last to finish

== Non-finishers ==
Fence	Name	Jockey	Age	Handicap (st-lb)	Starting price	Fate
01	Gyleburn	Ron Barry	9	10-4	20/1	Fell
01	Saggart's Choice	Tommy Stack	9	10-1	28-1	Fell
03	L'Escargot	Tommy Carberry	9	12-0	17/2	Knocked Over
04	Cardinal Error	John Francome	8	10-4	12/1	Refused
04	Lime Street	Richard Pitman	8	10-1	25/1	Unseated
06	Beau Park	Mr A Nicholson	9	11-2	50/1	Fell
06	Lisnaree	Frank Turner	9	10-0	100/1	Fell
06	Swan Shot	Pat McCarron	9	10-3	33/1	Fell
08	Nom De Guerre	Johnny Haine	10	10-0	33/1	Fell
09	Country Wedding	Bob Champion	10	10-4	50/1	Fell
10	Bullocks Horn	Richard Smith	9	10-0	28/1	Refused
10	Cloudsmere	David Mould	8	10-4	18/1	Fell
11	Gay Buccaneer	Tim Hyde	11	10-0	33/1	Unseated
11	The Inventor	Bill Shoemark	11	10-2	33/1	Refused
13	Alaska Fort	Bobby Beasley	7	10-13	33/1	Brought Down
13	The Pantheon	Ken White	9	10-4	33/1	Fell
15	Even Delight	Richard Dennard	7	10-2	40/1	Pulled Up
15	Vulture	Peter Brogan	10	10-2	100/1	Refused
16	Deblin's Green	David Cartwright	9	10-0	33/1	Pulled Up
17	Just A Gamble	Pat Buckley	10	10-1	100/1	Fell
19	Nephin Beg	Peter Morris	10	10-0	100/1	Pulled Up
19	The Otter	Buck Jones	11	10-0	25/1	Fell
19	Vichysoise	Philip Blacker	10	10-3	100/1	Refused
21	Miss Hunter	Arthur_Moore	11	10-0	50/1	Pulled Up
22	Fair Vulgan	Macer Gifford	8	10-0	14/1	Fell
22	Fortina's Palace	Jeff King	9	10-7	16/1	Fell
22	Kellsboro' Wood	Andy Turnell	12	10-0	100/1	Fell
23	Limeburner	Bill Rees	11	10-0	100/1	Pulled Up
23	Rigton Prince	John Enright	11	10-9	25/1	Pulled Up
23	Twigairy	Tom Davies	9	10-9	28/1	Pulled Up
24	Permit	Richard Evans	9	10-0	100/1	Fell
24	The Pooka	Cecil Ross	10	10-5	50/1	Fell
26	Pearl of Montreal	Bobby Coonan	9	10-4	55/1	Pulled Up

== Media coverage ==
David Coleman presented Grand National Grandstand on the BBC for the thirteenth year (his twelfth). Peter O'Sullevan, John Hanmer (first National), and Julian Wilson formed the commentary team. The three of them would go on to cover 21 National's together. Peter Bromley remained the voice on BBC radio.
