= Well To Do =

British-bred thoroughbred racehorse

- Sire: Phebus
- Dam: Princess Puzzlement
- Sex: Gelding
- Foaled: 1963
- Country: United Kingdom
- Colour: Chestnut
- Owner: Tim Forster
- Trainer: Tim Forster

Major wins
- Grand National (1972)

Well To Do (1963–1985) was a British-bred Thoroughbred racehorse who competed in National Hunt racing.

He is best known for winning the 1972 Grand National giving Tim Forster his first Grand National win of three.

He entered the National 14/1, a price which had dropped from 33/1 on confirmation that Graham Thorner would be his jockey.

== Grand National record ==
Grand National	Position	Jockey	Age	Weight	SP	Distance
1972	1st	Graham Thorner	9	10-1	14/1	
