= Fred Wilson (footballer) =

Australian rules footballer, born 1912

Personal information
- Full name: Fred Wilson
- Born: 17 July 1912
- Died: 5 January 1953 (aged 40)
- Original team: Union
- Height: 182 cm (6 ft 0 in)
- Weight: 78 kg (172 lb)

Playing career^{1}
Years	Club	Games (Goals)
1937	Richmond	7 (1)
- ^{1} Playing statistics correct to the end of 1937.

Fred Wilson (17 July 1912 – 5 January 1953) was a former Australian rules footballer who played with Richmond in the Victorian Football League (VFL).
