= Ben Nevis (horse) =

British-bred Thoroughbred racehorse

- Sire: Casmiri
- Grandsire: Bright News
- Dam: Ben Trumiss
- Damsire: Hop Bridge
- Sex: Gelding
- Foaled: 1968
- Country: United Kingdom
- Colour: Chestnut
- Breeder: A. S. Pattenden
- Owner: Redmond C. Stewart Jr.
- Trainer: Tim Forster
- Record: 21-9-3-2

Major wins
- Maryland Hunt Cup (1977, 1978); Grand National (1980)

Honours
- United States Racing Hall of Fame inductee (2009)

Ben Nevis (1968 – 26 February 1995) was a British-bred racehorse who became the third American-owned steeplechaser to win the Grand National at Aintree and was inducted into the National Museum of Racing and Hall of Fame in 2009. In the United States he was known as Ben Nevis II.

The racing colours of Ben Nevis were as follows - emerald green and white halved, striped sleeves, white cap.

== Early career ==
Ben Nevis was a chestnut gelding with a white blaze bred in England by A S Pattenden. Ben Nevis was named after a mountain in Scotland. He began his career on the amateur Point-to-point circuit but had little success and was exported to race in the United States.

== American career ==
In America, Ben Nevis was unbeatable, winning eight times while setting two course records. He was a repeat champion of the Maryland Hunt Cup. His other major victories were repeat wins in Maryland's Grand National point to point purse. In 1979, he was taken back to England to attempt to win the prestigious Grand National, and was sent to be trained by Captain Tim Forster at Letcombe Bassett in Oxfordshire.

== Return to England ==
In the 1979 Grand National, Ben Nevis was strongly fancied and started fourth choice in the betting but fell at The Chair obstacle. In the 1980 edition of the race, he went off an odds of 40/1 outsider in a race run on heavy going. He was ridden by the American amateur Charlie Fenwick, a merchant banker. By the second circuit, he had taken the lead. At the last jump, he was in front by 10 lengths, and at the end of the race he won by 20. Ben Nevis became the third American-owned jumps racehorse to win the Grand National. He died of colic in early 1995 at the age of 27, and was buried alongside the 13th fence at the Grand National course in Butler, Maryland.

== Hall of fame ==
In 2009 Ben Nevis was inducted into the National Museum of Racing and Hall of Fame.

== Grand National record ==
Grand National	Position	Jockey	Age	Weight	SP	Distance
1979	DNF	Charlie Fenwick	11	11-2	14/1	Brought Down at fence 15, Remounted, Pulled Up at fence 16
1980	1st	Charlie Fenwick	12	10-12	40/1	Won by 20 lengths

== See also ==
- List of racehorses
