= Blue Prince (album) =

Studio album by Philip Catherine
- Released: 2001
- Recorded: 13–15 June 2000
- Genre: Jazz, jazz fusion, post-bop
- Length: 64:25
- Label: Dreyfus Records
- Producer: Francis Dreyfus

Philip Catherine chronology
Guitar Groove	Blue Prince	Summer Night

Professional ratings
Review scores
Source	Rating
Allmusic	4/5 stars

Blue Prince is a 2001 album by the Belgian Jazz guitarist Philip Catherine. He was accompanied by Hein van de Geyn (double bass,) Hans Van Oosterhout (drums) and Bert Joris (bugle, trumpet.) The album was well received by Jazz critiques, rosing Catherine's performance and saying that (he is) "one of the finest guitarists on the globe."

The album Blue Prince earned AMG Album Pick with four stars by Allmusic.

== Reception of Blue Prince ==
Blue Prince received favourable reviews from a number of professional critics.

- Ronnie D. Lankford, Jr. (Allmusic)

"Philip Catherine has had a distinguished career, and Blue Prince captures him in fine form."

- Glenn Astarita (All About Jazz)

"Belgian guitarist Philip Catherine has performed with the creme de la creme of modern jazz and fusion. Blue Prince is a solid and expertly executed effort, as Catherine implicitly illustrates why he is one of the finest guitarists on the globe."

- Don Williamson (All About Jazz)

"Catherine has managed to blend all of his seemingly disparate interests into a compelling whole on Blue Prince, a complete summary of his vast talents."

== Track listing ==
No.	Title	Length
1.	"Coffe Groove"	3:34
2.	"Global Warning"	5:03
3.	"With a Song in My Heart Hart"	3:50
4.	"The Creeper"	7:42
5.	"The Postman"	5:39
6.	"More Bells"	6:35
7.	"Memories of You Blake"	4:22
8.	"Kwa Heri"	6:02
9.	"Blue Prince"	4:10
10.	"Arthur Rainbow"	6:32
11.	"Magic Box"	6:18
12.	"Sweet Lorraine"	4:38

== Personnel ==
- Philip Catherine - Guitar
- Hein van de Geyn - Double bass
- Hans Van Oosterhout - Drums
- Bert Joris - Bugle, Trumpet
