= West Tip =

Irish-bred Thoroughbred racehorse (1977–2001)

- Sire: Gala Performance
- Grandsire: Native Dancer
- Dam: Astryl
- Damsire: Vulgan
- Sex: Gelding
- Foaled: 1977
- Country: Ireland
- Colour: Bay
- Owner: Peter Luff
- Trainer: Michael Oliver

Major wins
- Ritz Club Handicap Chase (1985); Grand National (1986)
- Last updated on 7 March 2009

West Tip (1977 – July 2001) was a racehorse who won the Grand National in 1986.

== Background ==
West Tip was a bay gelding bred in Ireland near Fethard, County Tipperary, by Joe Hayes. He was owned by Peter Luff and during his racing career he was trained by Michael Oliver at Elmley Lovett near Droitwich in Worcestershire.

In 1982, West Tip was injured in an accident involving a lorry just down the lane from Michael Oliver's stables in Elmley Lovett. It was a foggy morning and Oliver's string was waiting for the arrival of jockey Philip Hobbs to join them riding out. As the horses were walking along Walton Lane the lorry approached and went past them. West Tip was the last in the string and whipped round as the lorry went by. Unfortunately a hook on the bed of the lorry caught West Tip on his near side hindquarters and tore a huge hole. The lorry did not stop. West Tip required over 70 internal stitches and many external stitches. It was feared that the horse would have to be put down, but thanks to the expertise of veterinary surgeon Peter Thorne, the horse made a complete recovery and went on to win on his racecourse debut at Warwick on 29 December 1982, at 50–1, ridden by Philip Hobbs. West Tip was left with a distinctive large scar on his hindquarters.

== Racing career ==
In 1985 West Tip won the Ritz Club Handicap Chase at the Cheltenham Festival. He started joint-favourite for the 1985 Grand National but fell at Bechers Brook on the second circuit while disputing the lead. West Tip returned to Aintree for the 1986 Grand National and started the 15/2 second favourite under a weight of 151 pounds. Ridden by Richard Dunwoody he was always amongst the leaders and jumped the last fence in second place behind the Scottish-trained outsider Young Driver. West Tip took the lead on the run-in and got the better of a sustained struggle with Young Driver to win by two lengths.

In subsequent runs in the National he finished fourth in 1987 and 1988, second in 1989, and tenth in 1990. On each occasion between 1985 and 1989 he was ridden by Dunwoody, and on his last appearance in 1990 he was ridden by Peter Hobbs.

== Grand National record ==
Grand National	Position	Jockey	Age	Weight	SP	Distance
1985	DNF	Richard Dunwoody	8	10-1	13/2 JF	Fell at fence 22 (Becher's Brook)
1986	1st	Richard Dunwoody	9	10-11	15/2	Won by 2 lengths
1987	4th	Richard Dunwoody	10	11-7	5/1 Fav	
1988	4th	Richard Dunwoody	11	11-7	11/1	2½ lengths
1989	2nd	Richard Dunwoody	12	10-11	12/1	½ length
1990	10th	Peter Hobbs	13	10-11	20/1	
