= Eric W. Mann =

English cricketer and philatelist

Eric Mann
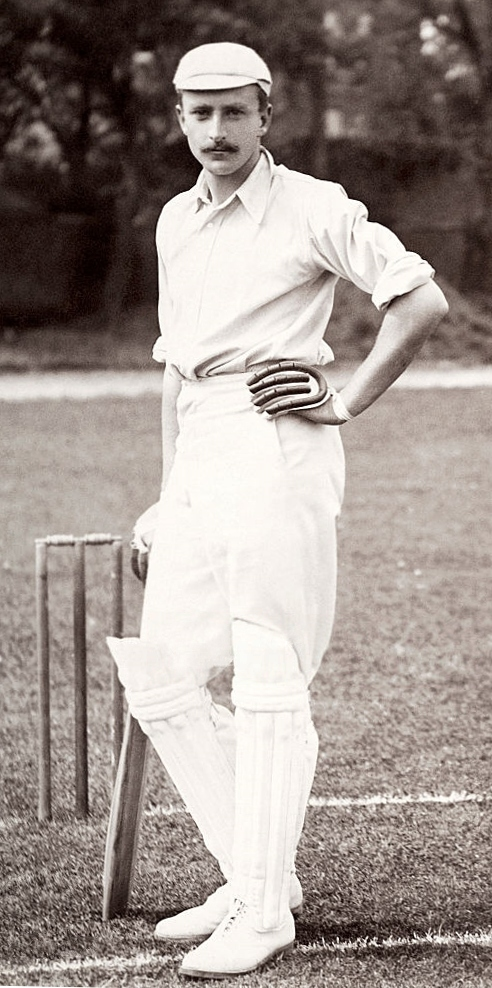
- Mann in about 1908

Personal information
- Full name: Eric William Mann
- Born: 4 March 1882; Sidcup, Kent, England
- Died: 11 February 1954 (aged 71); Rye, East Sussex, England
- Batting: Right-handed
- Bowling: Right-arm fast-medium

Domestic team information
- Years: Team
- 1902–1905: Cambridge University
- 1902–1903: Kent

Career statistics
Competition	First-class
Matches	43
Runs scored	1,932
Batting average	25.09
100s/50s	2/0
Top score	157
Balls bowled	744
Wickets	19
Bowling average	39.15
5 wickets in innings	0
10 wickets in match	0
Best bowling	4/25
Catches/stumpings	43/–
- Source: CricInfo, 11 December 2018

Eric William Mann (4 March 1882 – 11 February 1954) was an English cricketer and philatelist who signed the Roll of Distinguished Philatelists in 1947. He was President of the Royal Philatelic Society London between 1946 and 1949. Mann was an expert on the stamps of Natal and Tasmania.

== Early life ==
Mann was born at Sidcup in Kent and educated at Harrow School and Trinity College, Cambridge. He played both cricket and football at school, captaining the cricket team in 1901 and the football team in 1899 and 1900. He captained the cricket team to victory in the Eton v Harrow match at Lord's in 1901, scoring 69 runs in an innings which was described as "fine and attractive".

== Cricket ==
At school Mann was described as "a good player and a good captain" and at University he played for Cambridge University from 1902 to 1905, captaining it in his final season. He won his first cricket Blue in 1903 and played in three University matches from 1903 to 1905. His form as a batsman was generally steady and it was not until his final season at Cambridge that he stood out, topping the Cambridge batting averages with 758 runs at an average of 46.05 runs per innings, including scoring both of his first-class centuries. He captained the team to victory in the university match, although he made scores of only 14 and 0.

His Wisden obituary described Mann as "a hard-hitting batsman with free style and special strength on the leg-side" and as "a useful change bowler", although he played little first-class cricket after leaving university, at least in part due to business commitments. He played in six matches for Kent while he was at university, but had "little success" and averaged only 7.50 runs.

In 1905, Mann captained the Marylebone Cricket Club (MCC) team which toured North America, playing in both matches against the Gentlemen of Philadelphia, the last of his career. He continued to play club cricket when time allowed, playing for a variety of teams including Band of Brothers, Sidmouth and Marylebone Cricket Club (MCC).

== Business and later life ==
After leaving university, Mann joined the family business EW Mann & Co, a coal distribution and marketing business which operated across southern England. He married Kitzie Cameron, the daughter of Ewen Cameron, chairman of the Hong Kong and Shanghai Bank, in 1906; the couple had five children, one of whom died on active service during World War II.

Mann was in business throughout his life. He was a director of a range of companies, including pharmaceutical manufacturer's Southall's, British Safety Films, Belmont Hotels and Mann, Taylor & Co and was chairman of the British East Africa Corporation. He was president of the Royal Philatelic Society between 1946 and 1949 and hunted with the Royal Berkshire Hunt.

Mann died at Rye in Sussex in 1954 aged 71.

== Bibliography ==
- Carlaw, Derek (2020). Kent County Cricketers, A to Z: Part One (1806–1914) (PDF). Cardiff: ACS.
