= Frederic Wilson =

English cricketer and sporting journalist

Personal information
- Full name: Frederic Bonhote Wilson
- Born: 21 September 1881; Bayswater, Middlesex, England
- Died: 19 January 1932 (aged 50); Kensington, London, England
- Batting: Right-handed
- Bowling: Right-arm slow

Domestic team information
- Years: Team
- 1902–1904: Cambridge University

Career statistics
Competition	First-class
Matches	27
Runs scored	1,130
Batting average	26.90
100s/50s	–/8
Top score	76
Balls bowled	268
Wickets	4
Bowling average	45.25
5 wickets in innings	–
10 wickets in match	–
Best bowling	2/64
Catches/stumpings	15/–
- Source: Cricinfo, 19 June 2022

Frederic Bonhôte Wilson (21 September 1881 – 19 January 1932), known as Fred or Freddy, was a sporting journalist and, in his youth, a cricketer who played in first-class cricket matches for Cambridge University and amateur teams between 1902 and 1906. He was born and died in London.

Wilson was educated at Harrow School and at Trinity College, Cambridge. He was a successful schoolboy cricketer, playing in the Eton v Harrow match at Lord's in both 1899 and 1900, and in the second of these matches he scored 79 and 24 as a middle-order right-handed batsman and took four Etonian wickets with his right-arm slow bowling. At Cambridge, he bowled very little and won a Blue by playing as a reliable batsman in the University Match against Oxford University for three seasons from 1902 to 1904, having failed even to have a trial match in 1901. He captained the Cambridge side in 1904 and was criticised for delaying the second innings declaration so that Frederick Marsh could break the University Match record for the highest individual score, the match ending in a draw. Wisden Cricketers' Almanack wrote that the delay "was clearly a mistake" and that "the chance of winning the match should have outweighed all considerations of personal distinction", though it added that rain and missed catches also contributed to Cambridge's failure to win.

Wilson was an all-round sportsman at Cambridge, winning blues for lawn tennis and rackets, and the obituary for him in The Times in 1932 stated that he had seen rackets as his principal sport, though he was unable to continue as a player because of indifferent health. After leaving Cambridge University with a Bachelor of Arts degree, he played in only one further first-class cricket match, a game for the Marylebone Cricket Club in 1906.

Wilson became a schoolmaster at Rossall School in Lancashire, but did not take to the profession and became instead a sporting journalist, reporting on cricket, rackets and tennis principally, before the First World War, for the Daily Mirror, where he developed a distinctive "light" conversational style of reportage which was very popular. On the outbreak of war, he joined the Royal Naval Volunteer Reserve, later being commissioned into the Royal Fusiliers and being wounded in service. After the war, most of his journalism was for The Times and more serious in tone, and he claimed to have reported on more than 20 different sports.

Wilson's son, Peter Wilson, followed him into sports journalism and was sports editor of the Daily Mirror in the 1950s and 1960s, known as "The Man They Can't Gag" for his forthright opinions; Peter Wilson's own son, Julian Wilson, was the horse-racing correspondent for the British Broadcasting Corporation.
