= Colin Brown (jockey) =

English jockey

Colin Brown (born 16 August 1955) is a former National Hunt jockey in the UK, best known for his association with the famous steeplechaser Desert Orchid. He rode Desert Orchid in more than half his races, a total of 42 starts, winning 17 times. Many of Brown's successes were achieved through his association with Desert Orchid's trainer, David Elsworth. During his 16-year career, he rode more than 400 winners, among them Barnbrook Again in the 1987 Irish Sweeps Hurdle (now known as the Boylesports.com Hurdle), Burrough Hill Lad, Combs Ditch and Floyd, winner of the 1985 Imperial Cup, 1987 Fighting Fifth Hurdle and 1988 Kingwell Hurdle. He rode the 1989 Grand National winner Little Polveir when completing the course in the 1986 Grand National and when falling in the 1987 Grand National. He also partnered the 1988 Grand National winner, Rhyme 'n' Reason, to victory in the Mildmay Cazalet Memorial Chase at Sandown Park three months before his win at Aintree Racecourse. Brown retired as a jockey after riding at the Cheltenham Festival on 17 March 1988.
