= Hywel Davies (jockey) =

Welsh jockey

Personal information
- Born: 1957 (age 68–69) Cardigan, Ceredigion, Wales
- Occupations: Jockey (retired) and guest horse racing commentator with At the Races, Channel 4 Racing, BBC Cymru (TV and radio) and co-presenter of "Rasus" (S4C) from 1995-present day

Horse racing career
- Sport: Horse racing
- Career wins: UK–761; Worldwide–Greater than 800

Major racing wins
- 1985 Grand National; 1989 Hennessy Gold Cup; 1992 Whitbread Gold Cup; 1986 Peterborough Chase; 1990 Queen Mother Champion Chase; 1986 Whitbread Gold Label Cup

Hywel Davies is a retired Welsh professional National Hunt jockey. He rode for 16 years with 761 wins in the UK and he ended his riding career in 1994.

== Early life ==
Davies is a Welsh speaker and didn't speak English until he was 7 years of age. He attended Cardigan Comprehensive School from 1969 until 1975.

== Racing career ==
Davies was the retained jockey for Tim Forster for 8 years at his Letcombe Bassett stables near Lambourn in Berkshire. He became a freelance jockey and rode for several other trainers like Josh Gifford and Nicky Henderson. He won the 1985 Grand National on Last Suspect a 50-1 outsider. He retired from riding at the age of 37 in 1994. Since retiring Davies has been the UK representative Gain Horse Feeds.

== Career after racing ==
Davies has been a guest horse racing commentator on At the Races, Channel 4 Racing, BBC Cymru (TV and radio) and co-presenter of "Rasus" (S4C) from 1995–present day

== Personal life ==
Davies was born in Cardigan in 1957. He was married to Rachel Davies for 13 years. He has a son, James Davies, who is also a professional jockey. His current partner is Vikki Dunn, who is a co-founder of The Farm Group a post-production television company.
