= Julian Wilson (commentator) =

English horse racing presenter (1940–2014)

- Born: Julian David Bonhote Wilson; 21 June 1940; Sidmouth, Devon, England
- Died: 20 April 2014 (aged 73)
- Education: Harrow School
- Occupations: Television presenter (1979–1997); Sports commentator (1966–1992)
- Employer: BBC (1966–1997)
- Parent: Peter Wilson (father)
- Relatives: Frederic Wilson (grandfather), Eric W. Mann (grandfather)

Julian David Bonhote Wilson (21 June 1940 – 20 April 2014) was an Englishman who was BBC Television's horse racing correspondent from 1966 until his retirement in 1997. He was succeeded by Clare Balding. Between 1969 and 1992, he was one of the commentators for the Grand National and, for a time, had editorial control over the BBC's midweek racing coverage. He was born in Sidmouth, Devon. His father was the Daily Mirror sportswriter Peter Wilson, his grandfather the Times and Mirror sportswriter Frederic Wilson.

Outside his presenting career, Wilson was a racehorse owner and racing manager. His winners as an owner included Tumbledownwind, a two-year-old winner at Goodwood, and Tykeyvor, a winner in the Bessborough Stakes at Royal Ascot in 1996. He was a racehorse manager to Clement Freud and Walter Mariti.

Wilson was a former pupil of Harrow School.

== Broadcasting ==
During his debut Grand National commentary in 1969, Wilson covered the first four fences on both circuits. The following year only he and Peter O'Sullevan provided commentary. From 1971 three commentators were again used for the National and Wilson was stationed out at Becher's Brook where he would remain until 1992.

Wilson's final broadcast on the BBC's Grandstand programme was on Saturday 20 December 1997 with racing from Ascot. The BBC also showed highlights and memories of his broadcasting career.

The final broadcast of his career came a week later (27 December) as BBC 2 showed racing from Chepstow which included the Welsh Grand National.

In his autobiography Some You Win, published in 1998, he revealed a rift with Peter O'Sullevan, his long-time colleague at the BBC. Wilson felt that he had been misled as to whether or not he would succeed O'Sullevan as chief BBC race commentator. He also said that he had a strained relationship with Clare Balding.

== Personal life ==
He was twice married: firstly to Carolyn Michael in 1970, then to Alison Ramsay in 1981. He had one son, Thomas, with his first wife. Wilson died of cancer on 20 April 2014.
