= Corbiere (horse) =

British-bred Thoroughbred racehorse

- Sire: Harwell
- Grandsire: Court Harwell
- Dam: Ballycashin
- Damsire: Vulgan
- Sex: Gelding
- Foaled: 1975
- Country: United Kingdom
- Colour: Chestnut
- Breeder: M Parkhill
- Owner: B Burrough
- Trainer: Jenny Pitman

Major wins
- Welsh Grand National (1982); Grand National (1983)

Corbiere (1975–1988) was the racehorse which won the Grand National in 1983. In training, Corbiere was also known as Corky.

== Background ==
Corbiere was a chestnut gelding with a broad white blaze bred in the United Kingdom by M Parkhill. During his racing career, he was trained by Jenny Pitman at Lambourn.

== Racing career ==
In December 1982 the seven-year-old Corbiere won the Welsh Grand National and was then aimed at the 1983 Grand National. At Aintree he carried 158 pounds and started at odds on 13/1 and was ridden by Ben De Haan. Corbiere was always among the leaders and went to the front after Valentine's Brook on the second circuit. He was strongly challenged by the Irish horse Greasepaint in the run-in but held on to win by three-quarters of a length. His victory made Pitman the first woman to train a Grand National winner.

Corbiere also came third in the 1984 and 1985 Grand Nationals, and after falling in 1986, he finished 12th in 1987.

== Grand National record ==
Grand National	Position	Jockey	Age	Weight	SP	Distance
1983	1st	Ben De Haan	8	11-4	13/1	Won by ¾ length
1984	3rd	Ben De Haan	9	12-0	16/1	
1985	3rd	Peter Scudamore	10	11-10	9/1	7 lengths
1986	DNF	Ben De Haan	11	11-7	14/1	Fell at fence 4
1987	12th	Ben De Haan	12	10-00	12/1	

== Pedigree ==
Pedigree of Corbiere (GB), chestnut gelding, 1975
Sire Harwell (IRE) 1962	Court Harwell (GB); 1954	Prince Chevalier	Prince Rose
Sire Harwell (IRE) 1962	Court Harwell (GB); 1954	Prince Chevalier	Chevalerie
Sire Harwell (IRE) 1962	Court Harwell (GB); 1954	Neutron	Hyperion
Sire Harwell (IRE) 1962	Court Harwell (GB); 1954	Neutron	Participation
Sire Harwell (IRE) 1962	East Africa (GB); 1951	Ujiji	Umidwar
Sire Harwell (IRE) 1962	East Africa (GB); 1951	Ujiji	Theresina
Sire Harwell (IRE) 1962	East Africa (GB); 1951	Blandana	Easton
Sire Harwell (IRE) 1962	East Africa (GB); 1951	Blandana	Centeno
Dam Ballycashin (GB) 1963	Vulgan (FR); 1943	Sirlan	Sir Nigel
Dam Ballycashin (GB) 1963	Vulgan (FR); 1943	Sirlan	Laniste
Dam Ballycashin (GB) 1963	Vulgan (FR); 1943	Vulgate	Motrico
Dam Ballycashin (GB) 1963	Vulgan (FR); 1943	Vulgate	Vodka
Dam Ballycashin (GB) 1963	Ballyrory (GB); 1952	Flamenco	Flamingo
Dam Ballycashin (GB) 1963	Ballyrory (GB); 1952	Flamenco	Valescure
Dam Ballycashin (GB) 1963	Ballyrory (GB); 1952	Fuse	Match
Dam Ballycashin (GB) 1963	Ballyrory (GB); 1952	Fuse	Marine Lady (Family: 3-j)
