= Tom Olliver Handicap Chase =

Steeplechase horse race in Britain

- Class: Premier Handicap
- Location: Cheltenham Racecourse, Cheltenham, Gloucestershire, England
- Race type: Steeplechase
- Sponsor: Oddschecker
- Website: Cheltenham

Race information
- Distance: 3 miles 3 furlongs 71 yards (5,496 metres)
- Surface: Turf
- Qualification: Four-years-old and up
- Weight: Handicap; Maximum: 11 st 12 lb
- Purse: £75,000 (2025); 1st: £42,713

Tom Olliver Handicap Chase
2026
Holokea	Resplendent Grey	Double Powerful

Previous years
2023
Malina Girl	Cloudy Glen	Guetapan Collonges
2022
Does He Know	Eva's Oskar	Back On The Lash
2021
Yala Enki	The Mighty Don	Empire De Maulde

2020-2011
2020
Ramses De Teillee	Yala Enki	Big River
2019
West Approach	Achille	Potters Legend
2018
Rock The Kasbah	Royal Vacation	Coneygree
2017
Perfect Candidate	Vicente	Three Faces West
2016
Viconte Du Noyer	Warrantor	Minella Rocco
2015
Sausalito Sunrise	Upswing	Knockanrawley
2014
Sam Winner	The Druids Nephew	Saint Are
2013
Alvarado	Knockara Beau	Bradley
2012
Monbeg Dude	Bradley	Viking Blond
2011
Galaxy Rock	Ballyfitz	Carruthers

2010-2001
2010
Midnight Chase	Any Currency	Junior
2009
Galant Nuit	Don't Push It	Hello Bud
2008
Joe Lively	Halcon Genelardais	Beat The Boys
2007
Sir Rembrandt	Cornish Sett	L'ami
2006
My Will	Idle Talk	Run For Paddy
2005
Innox	Lou Du Moulin Mas	Control Man
2004
Stormez	Ballycassidy	Lord Noelie
2003
Shardam	Stormez	Montayral
2002
Stormez	Southern Star	Good Shuil
2001
Hati Roy	Beau	Earthmover

2000-1991
2000
Foxchapel King	Earthmover	Beau
1999
Hanakham	Callisoe Bay	Baronet
1998
Tennessee Twist	Strong Chairman	Yahmi
1997
Banjo	What A Hand	Coome Hill
1996
Evangelica	Copper Mine	Martomick
1995
Willsford	Earth Summit	Flyer's Nap
1994
Gold Cap	Dakyns Boy	Christmas Gorse
1993
Royal Athlete	What's The Crack	Dakyns Boy
1992
Belmount Captain	Arctic Call	Seagram
1991
Ace Of Spies	Master Bob	Bigsun

1990-1987
1990
Topsham Bay	Bigsun	Golden Minstrel
1989
Royal Cedar	Bajan Sunshine	The Langholm Dyer
1988
Run And Skip	The Langholm Dyer	Eton Rouge
1987
Knock Hill	The Langholm Dyer	West Tip

The Tom Olliver Handicap Chase (currently known as the Oddschecker Handicap Chase for sponsorship reasons) is a Premier Handicap National Hunt race in Great Britain. It is a handicap steeplechase and is run at Cheltenham Racecourse in November, over a distance of about 3 miles and 3½ furlongs (3 miles 3 furlongs and 71 yards, or 5,496 metres).

== History ==
From 1987 to 1998 the race was known as the Flowers Original Handicap Chase. The 1999 running was known as the Hoegaarden Handicap Chase. From 2000 to 2002 it was sponsored by Intervet and known as the Intervet Trophy. The 2003 race was run under the name of the Open Trophy. The race was sponsored by Servo from 2004 to 2009, Morson Group in 2010 and Rewards4Racing in 2011. In 2012 it was renamed the Henrietta Knight Handicap Chase in honour of Henrietta Knight, a recently retired trainer whose training successes included winning three Cheltenham Gold Cups with Best Mate. From 2013 to 2015 the race was sponsored by the Murphy Group, whilst Oddschecker sponsor for 2026. In 2026, the race gained the registered title of the Tom Olliver Handicap Chase, honouring three-time Grand National-winning jockey Tom Olliver.

== Records since 1987 ==
Most successful horse:

- Stormez – (2002, 2004)

Leading jockey (4 wins):

- Tony McCoy – Evangelica (1996), Hanakham (1999), Innox (2005), Galaxy Rock (2011)

Leading trainer (4 wins):

- Martin Pipe – Evangelica (1996), Hanakham (1999), Stormez (2002, 2004)
- Widest winning margin – Joe Lively (2008) – 14 lengths
- Narrowest winning margin – Hati Roy (2001), My Will (2006), Galant Nuit (2009) – ½ length
- Most runners – 16, in 2005
- Fewest runners – 4, in 1992 and 1996

== Winners since 1987 ==
Year	Winner	Age	Weight	Jockey	Trainer
1987	Knock Hill	11	10–00	George Mernagh	John Webber
1988	Run And Skip	10	11–07	Peter Scudamore	John Spearing
1989	Royal Cedar	8	10–01	Richard Dunwoody	John McConnochie
1990	Topsham Bay	7	10–07	Hywel Davies	David Barons
1991	Ace of Spies	10	09-09	Adrian Maguire	Gill Jones
1992	Belmount Captain	7	10–03	Richard Guest	Toby Balding
1993	Royal Athlete	10	12–00	Graham Bradley	Jenny Pitman
1994	Gold Cap	9	10–00	Richard Dunwoody	Philip Hobbs
1995	Willsford	12	12–00	Warren Marston	Jenny Pitman
1996	Evangelica	6	10–00	Tony McCoy	Martin Pipe
1997	Banjo	7	11–02	Adrian Maguire	David Nicholson
1998	Tennessee Twist	8	10–00	Norman Williamson	Jenny Pitman
1999	Hanakham	10	11–10	Tony McCoy	Martin Pipe
2000	Foxchapel King	7	10–05	Shay Barry	Mouse Morris
2001	Hati Roy	8	10–13	Jim Culloty	Henrietta Knight
2002	Stormez	5	10–06	Barry Geraghty	Martin Pipe
2003	Shardam	6	10–02	Carl Llewellyn	Nigel Twiston-Davies
2004	Stormez	7	11–05	Timmy Murphy	Martin Pipe
2005	Innox	9	10–06	Tony McCoy	François Doumen
2006	My Will	6	11–06	Ruby Walsh	Paul Nicholls
2007	Sir Rembrandt	11	10–02	James White	Victor Dartnall
2008	Joe Lively	9	10–03	Joe Tizzard	Colin Tizzard
2009	Galant Nuit	5	10–00	Graham Lee	Ferdy Murphy
2010	Midnight Chase	8	11–09	Dougie Costello	Neil Mulholland
2011	Galaxy Rock	7	10-10	Tony McCoy	Jonjo O'Neill
2012	Monbeg Dude	7	10–00	Jamie Moore	Michael Scudamore
2013	Alvarado	8	10–00	Paul Moloney	Fergal O'Brien
2014	Sam Winner	7	11–12	Sam Twiston-Davies	Paul Nicholls
2015	Sausalito Sunrise	7	11–03	Richard Johnson	Philip Hobbs
2016	Viconte Du Noyer	7	10–13	Harry Cobden	Colin Tizzard
2017	Perfect Candidate	10	10–12	Paddy Brennan	Fergal O'Brien
2018	Rock the Kasbah	8	10–13	Richard Johnson	Philip Hobbs
2019	West Approach	9	11–01	Robbie Power	Colin Tizzard
2020	Ramses De Teillee	8	11–05	Tom Scudamore	David Pipe
2021	Yala Enki	7	11–12	Bryony Frost	Paul Nicholls
2022	Does He Know	7	12–00	David Bass	Kim Bailey
2023	Malina Girl	6	11–07	Sean Flanagan	Gavin Cromwell
2024	Abuffalosoldier	7	10–03	Sean Bowen	Warren Greatrex
2025	Marble Sands	9	10–05	Kielan Woods	David Killahena & Graeme McPherson
2026	Holokea	7	10-08	Brian Hughes	Mickey Bowen

== See also ==
- Horse racing in Great Britain
- List of British National Hunt races
