= 1996 Grand National =

English steeplechase horse race

- Grand National
- Location: Aintree
- Date: 30 March 1996
- Winning horse: (England) Rough Quest
- Starting price: 7/1 F
- Jockey: (Republic of Ireland) Mick Fitzgerald
- Trainer: (Republic of Ireland) Terry Casey
- Owner: Andrew Wates

External videos
- 1996 Grand National in full Racing UK, BBC Sport, YouTube

The 1996 Grand National (known as the Martell Grand National for sponsorship reasons) was the 149th official renewal of the world-famous Grand National steeplechase that took place at Aintree on 30 March 1996. It was the first national to run since 3 time winner Red Rum was buried at the winning post following his death the previous October.

The race was won in a time of nine minutes and 0.8 seconds and by a distance of 1 1/4 lengths by Rough Quest, the 7/1 favourite, ridden by Mick Fitzgerald. The winner was trained by Terry Casey at his base in Dorking, Surrey, and ran in the colours of Andrew Wates, the chairman of Kempton Park Racecourse. Casey collected £142,534 of a total prize fund shared through the first four finishers of over £230,000. A maximum of 40 competitors was permitted but only 27 ran. There was one equine fatality during the race.

== Leading contenders ==
Rough Quest was sent off as 7/1 favourite having won the Racing Post Chase at Kempton in February and then followed up by finishing second in the Cheltenham Gold Cup sixteen days before the National. Jockey Mick Fitzgerald took his second ride in the race. The favourite moved into contention at the start of the second circuit, taking the last flight in second place before overhauling the leader to win by 1 1/4 lengths.

Son Of War was regarded as the housewives' choice, being the only grey in the race and was considered the best hope of a first Irish-trained victory for over two decades, having won the Irish Grand National in 1994. Connor O'Dwyer was taking his sixth ride in the race and had moved into tenth position when he was unseated at the Canal Turn on the second circuit.

Young Hustler, trained by Nigel Twiston-Davies, was having his third attempt in the National, having fallen early on in 1994 and being brought down before completing a circuit in 1995. However he regained public confidence when winning the Becher Chase over one circuit of the course in November. Chris Maude was given his second ride in the race and took the 8/1 shot to the front right from the start, remaining there until being headed turning for the second-last and eventually finishing fifth.

Superior Finish had also failed to complete a circuit of his previous attempt at the National in 1995 when considered an each-way chance but was backed down to 9/1 when the most experienced and successful rider in the race, Richard Dunwoody, booked him as his 11th National ride after winning the Cazelet/Mildmay Memorial Chase in February. The horse looked to be struggling taking the Canal Turn for the second time but finished strongly, passing beaten horses to snatch third place on the line.

Life Of A Lord was a seventh National ride for Charlie Swan and was backed down to 10/1 after winning the Kerry Grand National the previous September. The only ever training entry of the flat trainer, Aidan O'Brien, he had every chance when jumping the Canal Turn in fifth place but came under pressure after the third-last and faded to finish seventh.

Party Politics was a favourite among the masses of once-a-year punters, having won the race in 1992 and been second in 1995, and provided Carl Llewellyn with his sixth ride, having also been in the saddle for all three of his mount's previous attempts, including the void race of 1993. The former winner was a shock faller at the third fence and was promptly retired.

Other well-fancied runners included 1995 Agfa Diamond Chase winner Deep Bramble who was pulled up after going lame on the way to the second-last fence and was later retired; twice Thystes Chase winner Wylde Hide who was still in touch in 11th place when unseating his rider at the Canal Turn second time around; Fulke Walwyn Kim Muir Challenge Cup runner-up at Cheltenham Encore En Peu, who moved up to dispute the lead at Valentine's on the second circuit before going clear after the second-last, only to be headed after the elbow; and the 1994 Badger Ales Chase winner Lusty Light, despite having fallen at the first fence in 1995, who this time got around without ever getting into contention to finish a distant 16th.

== Finishing order ==
Position	Name	Jockey	Age	Weight (st, lb)	Starting price	Distance
1st	Rough Quest	Mick Fitzgerald	10	10-07	7/1 F	Won by 1 1/4 lengths
2nd	Encore Un Peu (FRA)	David Bridgwater	9	10-00	14/1	16 lengths
3rd	Superior Finish	Richard Dunwoody	10	10-03	9/1	Short head
4th	Sir Peter Lely	Mr. Chris Bonner	9	10-00	33/1	3/4 length
5th	Young Hustler	Chris Maude	9	11-07	8/1	4 lengths
6th	Three Brownies	Paul Carberry	9	10-00	100/1	14 lengths
7th	Life Of A Lord	Charlie Swan	10	11-06	10/1	13 lengths
8th	Antonin (FRA)	John Burke	8	10-00	28/1	2 1/2 lengths
9th	Over The Deel	Mr. Tim McCarthy	10	10-00	33/1	15 lengths
10th	Vicompt De Valmont	Philip Hide	11	10-01	22/1	4 lengths
11th	Captain Dibble	Tom Jenks	11	10-00	40/1	2 lengths
12th	Riverside Boy	David Walsh	13	10-00	66/1	14 lengths
13th	Over The Stream	Andrew Thornton	10	10-00	50/1	14 lengths
14th	Greenhill Raffles	Martin Foster	10	10-00	100/1	3 lengths
15th	Into The Red	Richard Guest	12	10-00	33/1	A distance
16th	Lusty Light	Warren Marston	10	10-11	14/1	A distance
17th	Sure Metal	Donald McCain, Jr.	13	10-01	200/1	Last to complete

== Non-finishers ==
Fence	Name	Jockey	Age	Weight (st, lb)	Starting price	Fate
1st	Bavard Dieu (IRE)	Jason Titley	8	10-01	50/1	Unseated rider
1st	Bishops Hall	Mr. Marcus Armytage	10	10-01	22/1	Unseated rider
3rd	Party Politics	Carl Llewellyn	12	10-11	10/1	Fell
5th	Chatam (USA)	Jonothan Lower	12	10-03	40/1	Refused
13th	Rust Never Sleeps	Trevor Horgan	12	10-00	20/1	Pulled up
19th	Brackenfield	Guy Lewis	10	10-00	100/1	Unseated rider
22nd (Becher's Brook)	Far Senior	Tim Eley	10	10-00	150/1	Tailed off, pulled up
24th (Canal Turn)	Son Of War	Conor O'Dwyer	9	11-00	8/1	Unseated rider
24th	Wylde Hide	Francis Woods	9	10-00	12/1	Unseated rider
29th	Deep Bramble	Tony McCoy	8	10-01	50/1	Pulled up

Rust Never Sleeps and Deep Bramble were found to have broken down badly and while the latter recovered and was retired from racing, the former was euthanised. Former winner Party Politics was also retired after the race. Jason Titley was the only rider injured during the race and was taken to hospital after his fall at the first fence.

== Media coverage ==
Encore En Peu leads with Rough Quest over in second, Young Hustler third. Racing towards the elbow... Encore En Peu from Rough Quest. Rough Quest coming to tackle him towards the nearside. Rough Quest, the Gold Cup second is now striding away! And Rough Quest is going to win the 1996 National! Rough Quest comes up to the line to win it.

— Commentator Peter O'Sullevan describes the climax of the race

The BBC retained the rights to broadcast the race live on television for the 37th consecutive year and was shown as part of a Grandstand Grand National special, presented live from the course by Des Lynam. The race would start earlier this year at 3.00pm so to fit in the Formula One qualifying for the Brazilian Grand Prix later in the programme.

The build-up to the race included analysis of the runners from Richard Pitman, Peter Scudamore and Bill Smith and interviews with connections in the saddling boxes and parade ring from Sue Barker, while Julian Wilson also provided special reports and a postscript of events afterwards.

The race itself was covered for the third consecutive year by commentary team John Hamner, Jim McGrath, and lead commentator Peter O'Sullevan, who called the winner home for the 49th year.

Pitman, Scudamore and Smith also covered a slow motion replay of the race.

== Stewards' enquiry ==
The 1996 race was only the second National in history where a stewards' enquiry was called against the winner. The possibility that Rough Quest had crossed and impeded Encore En Peu on the run-in was investigated.

While television pictures clearly showed David Bridgwater having to reel in the reins of his mount to avoid a collision, it was also evident that Rough Quest was finishing the stronger, having overtaken Encore En Peu on the run-in. The stewards upheld the result despite suggestions that the result would have been overturned in a less significant race. Julian Wilson commented on Grandstand: "The wonderful thing is that a change in the rules has allowed the winner to keep the race but to be honest ten or twelve years ago I think he would have been thrown out and the second would have got it." Second-placed Bridgwater said: "I thought three out that I was gonna win. Mick [Fitzgerald] has come across me and I've had to snatch up a little bit and had it been at Hereford I probably would have got it but being as it's Aintree and there's so many million people watching, they've gotta be a bit careful about it. It was the right result on the day. If I'd have got it in the stewards' room it wouldn't have felt like I'd won a Grand National."

There was also a stewards enquiry into third place but the result was also allowed to stand.

Once the enquiry was complete, Mick Fitzgerald made the infamous comment in a post-race interview: "I've not enjoyed 12 minutes for as long in a long time. I think sex is an anti-climax after that!"
