= The Chair (Aintree Racecourse) =

Fence on Aintree Racecourse, England

The Chair is a fence on Aintree Racecourse's National Course and thus is one of 30 that are jumped during the Grand National steeplechase which is held annually at the racecourse near Liverpool, England.

It is the 15th fence that the runners jump and is one of only two (the other being the 16th, the Water Jump) in the race to be negotiated only once.

Positioned in front of the grandstand, it is the tallest fence on the course, at 5 feet 2 inches (1.57 m), preceded by a 6 feet 0 inches (1.83 m) open ditch on the takeoff side. The Chair is also comfortably the narrowest fence on the Grand National course, bar the Water Jump. The landing side of The Chair fence is actually 6 inches (15 cm) above the ground on the takeoff side, creating the reverse effect to that at the Becher's Brook fence, meaning the ground comes up to meet horse and rider sooner than anticipated.

Generally it is jumped fairly safely by most horses in the Grand National field, probably due to the lengthy run they have before reaching the fence, and because, by the time the fence is approached, most of the runners have settled into a smooth running rhythm. However, it regularly claims fallers, not just in the Grand National but other races held over the course. Perhaps The Chair's most notorious pile up occurred during the 1979 Grand National, won by Rubstic. Two loose horses veered across the main body of the field and contributed to the falls or refusals of nine horses, including Kintai who was euthanised as a result of injuries sustained when he was brought down. For the following year's race, in which Ben Nevis returned and won having been one of the victims in the prior year's pile-up, channels were installed around the fence so that loose horses reluctant to negotiate the obstacle were able to bypass it rather than jump over it. There has been no equine fatality in the Grand National at The Chair since 1979, and only three at the fence since the race was founded in 1839.

The Chair has also claimed the life of the only human fatality in a Grand National when Joseph Wynne, the son of former winning jockey Denny Wynne, was badly injured in a fall at the fence during the 1862 running. Although taken alive from the course to the nearby Sefton Arms pub, he died hours later, never having regained consciousness. Former winning jockey George Ede, who rode under the name Mr. Edwards, also lost his life in a fall at the fence in 1872, albeit not in a Grand National. In the 1964 Grand National, rider Paddy Farrell fractured his spine in a fall at The Chair. His plight highlighted the lack of support for jockeys who are badly injured in racing, leading to the creation of the Injured Jockeys' Fund.

The fence has caught out numerous Grand National winners over the years, including Russian Hero (1951), Ayala (1964), Rubstic (1980) and Silver Birch (2006).

The Chair receives its name from the chair once situated alongside the fence, at which a distance judge would sit when races used to be run in heats. Horses that tailed off too far were disqualified from later heats. In the 19th century the fence was more widely known as The Monument, but this term began to fall out of favour during the 1890s, although it was still occasionally used in the press up to and during the 1920s.

== Number of fallers ==
This table documents the number of runners which fell in recent Grand Nationals at The Chair, including those who unseated riders or were brought down, but not those who were pulled up, carried out or refused at the fence. The 2020 running was cancelled due to the COVID-19 pandemic.

Year	Falls
2026	2
2025	0
2024	2
2023	2
2022	3
2021	2
2019	0
2018	2
2017	1
2016	2
2015	0
2014	1
2013	1
2012	1
2011	0
2010	1
2009	1
2008	0
2007	0
2006	3
2005	1
2004	1
2003	1
2002	0
2001	3
2000	0
1999	0
1998	0
1997	1
1996	0
1995	0
1994	2
1993*	0
1992	1
1991	1
1990	1
1989	0
1988	0

*Race void
