= 1995 Grand National =

English steeplechase horse race

- Grand National
- Location: Aintree
- Date: 8 April 1995
- Winning horse: (England) Royal Athlete
- Starting price: 40/1
- Jockey: (Republic of Ireland) Jason Titley
- Trainer: (England) Jenny Pitman
- Owner: Gary & Libby Johnson
- Conditions: Good

External videos
- 1995 Grand National in full Racing UK, BBC Sport, YouTube

The 1995 Grand National (officially known as the Martell Grand National for sponsorship reasons) was the 148th official renewal of the famous Grand National steeplechase that took place at Aintree near Liverpool, England, on 8 April 1995.

The race was won in a time of nine minutes and 4.1 seconds and by a distance of seven lengths by Royal Athlete, at 40/1, ridden by Irish rider Jason Titley. The winner was a second victory in the race for trainer Jenny Pitman of Lambourn, Berkshire, and ran in the colours of Gary and Libby Johnson. Pitman collected £118,854 of a total prize fund shared through the first five finishers of £200,000. A maximum of 40 competitors was permitted but only 35 ran. All of the horses that took part returned safely.

== Leading contenders ==
Master Oats had carried all before him since falling in the 1994 Grand National and was installed as 5/1 favourite after winning the Welsh Grand National in December, before winning the Cheltenham Gold Cup in March. He was bidding to be the first horse to win the Gold Cup and Grand National in the same season for 61 years but handicapped with the top weight of 11 stone and 10 lb. Regular rider Norman Williamson was having his fifth ride in the National and took the favourite up to dispute the lead at the start of the second circuit, which they disputed with Royal Athlete until the home turn where it became apparent that the extra weight was telling. The top weight jumped the final fence in second place but was never likely to catch the eventual winner and quickly weakened to finish seventh, 15¼ lengths off victory.

Dubacilla was bidding to be the first mare to win the race for 43 years and was made 9/1 second favourite after finishing second to Master Oats in the Gold Cup. She was Dean Gallagher's third National ride but was outpaced in the early stages, struggling to keep in touch on the first circuit and was still well to the rear as the field took the Canal Turn for the second time. The mare began to eat up ground in the final mile and although never in contention of victory she managed to overhaul tired opponents to claim fourth place, 13½ lengths down on the winner in what proved to be her final race.

Young Hustler was the winner of the 1993 Sun Alliance chase who had been brought down when well supported in the 1994 National before bouncing back to win the Charlie Hall chase in October and finish fifth in the Gold Cup. He was sent off at 10/1 when Carl Llewellyn chose him as his fifth National mount over his partner in victory in 1992, Party Politics. The horse's popularity was increased by his sponsorship from tabloid newspaper The Sun, whose readers were advised to back him in the week leading up to the race. The hopes of those backers were dashed early when falling at the third fence.

Country Member was the winner of the 1993 Agfa Diamond Chase before coming into the reckoning for the National as an 11/1 chance after winning the Horse & Hound Grand Military Cup at Sandown a month before the big race. Regular professional rider Luke Harvey missed out on that ride as it was a race for amateur riders only but was restored for what was his second ride in the National, which ended when Country Member crumpled at the first fence.

Miinnehoma was naturally popular with the once-a-year betting public, having won the 1994 National and was again partnered by Richard Dunwoody, the most experienced and successful rider in the race, weighing out for his 11th National and at 11/1. The defending champion was always struggling and was tailed off by the time the field reached the ninth fence (Valentine's), eventually being pulled up before the 21st.

Other well backed contestants included the former top class novice hurdler and chaser and voted best turned out on the day, Crystal Spirit, Badger Beer Chase winner Lusty Light at 12/1, the 1991 runner-up Garrison Savannah, 1992 winner Party Politics at 16/1, the 1993 Mackeson Gold Cup third-placed General Pershing, Becher Chase winner Into The Red, 1994 Irish Grand National runner-up Nouaffe and third-placed Ebony Jane, and double Whitbread Gold Cup winner Topsham Bay at 20/1.

Eventual winner Royal Athlete was among those worthy of respect but considered out of form with Chatam, Riverside Boy, Romany King and Superior Finish, and was sent off at 40/1. Jockey Jason Titley was among 12 riders making their race debut, including two future winners, Tony McCoy (on Chatam) and Mick Fitzgerald (on Tinryland). At the other extreme, John White who crossed the line first in the void race of 1993, was lured out of retirement to remount Esha Ness for what proved to be his last ride in the race.

At the other extreme of the betting market, Its A Snip was sent off as a 200/1 outsider, having been allotted only 6 stones and 6 lbs by the handicapper. No horse in the history of the race prior to or up to 2011 has ever faced the starter on such a low handicap. The horse actually carried 10 stones, the minimum weight allowed in the National, and fell on the first circuit.

Royal Athlete was also one of a six-strong line-up saddled by trainer Jenny Pitman, which at that time was the largest number of horses prepared for one Grand National by a single trainer.

For the first time since 1978, the triple National winner Red Rum did not lead the parade of competitors due to old age and failing health. The record breaking winner died later that year.

== Finishing order ==
40 runners were declared on the Tuesday before the race but five, including Tartan Tyrant, were withdrawn before raceday. That left 35 to face the starter, which for the second consecutive year was Simon Morant who again despatched the field at the first attempt.

Position	Name	Jockey	Age	Weight (st, lb)	Starting price	Distance
1st	Royal Athlete	Jason Titley	12	10-06	40/1	Won by 7 lengths
2nd	Party Politics	Mark Dwyer	11	10-02	16/1	6 lengths
3rd	Over The Deel	Mr. Chris Bonner	9	10-00	100/1	½ length
4th	Dubacilla	Dean Gallagher	9	11-00	9/1	½ length
5th dead heat	Into The Red	Richard Guest	11	10-00	20/1	½ length
5th dead heat	Romany King	Mr. Marcus Armytage	11	10-00	40/1	1¼ lengths
7th	Master Oats	Norman Williamson	9	11-10	5/1 F	13 lengths
8th	Riverside Boy	Charlie Swan	12	10-00	40/1	11 lengths
9th	Garrison Savannah	Warren Marston	12	10-00	16/1	9 lengths
10th	Topsham Bay	Philip Hide	12	10-00	20/1	5 lengths
11th	Cool Ground	Paul Holley	13	10-00	50/1	½ length
12th	Ebony Jane	Adrian Maguire	10	10-00	20/1	A distance
13th	Gold Cap	Graham McCourt	10	10-00 (carried 10-06)	50/1	20 lengths
14th	Crystal Spirit	Jamie Osborne	8	10-04	12/1	A distance
15th	For William	Conor O'Dwyer	9	10-00	100/1	Last to complete

== Non-finishers ==
Fence	Name	Jockey	Age	Weight (st, lb)	Starting price	Fate
1st	Bishops Hall	Chris Maude	9	10-00	66/1	Fell
1st	Country Member	Luke Harvey	10	10-00	11/1	Fell
1st	Errant Knight	Mark Perrett	11	10-00	75/1	Unseated rider
1st	Jumbeau	Simon McNeill	10	10-00	100/1	Brought down
1st	Lusty Light	Rod Farrant	9	10-02	12/1	Fell
1st	The Committee	Tsuyoshi Tanaka (JPN)	12	10-00	75/1	Fell
1st	Tinryland	Mick Fitzgerald	11	10-00 (carried 10-02)	50/1	Fell
3rd (open ditch)	Young Hustler	Carl Llewellyn	8	11-02	10/1	Unseated rider
3rd (open ditch)	General Pershing	David Bridgwater	9	10-00	20/1	Unseated rider
3rd (open ditch)	Zeta's Lad	Graham Bradley	12	10-03	50/1	Fell
10th	Dakyns Boy	Tom Jenks	10	10-00	50/1	Unseated rider
10th	Superior Finish	Peter Niven	9	10-00 (carried 10-03)	33/1	Unseated rider
12th	Chatam (USA)	Tony McCoy	11	10-06	25/1	Fell
12th	Esha Ness	John White	12	10-00	50/1	Fell
12th	Its A Snip	John Kavanagh	10	10-00	200/1	Unseated rider
20th	Do Be Brief	Brendan Powell	10	10-00	66/1	Fell
20th	Nuaffe	Sean O'Donovan	10	10-00	20/1	Fell
21st	Camelot Knight	Mr. Mark Rimell	9	10-00 (carried 10-02)	66/1	Fell
21st	Desert Lord	Fran Woods	9	10-00	100/1	Fell
21st	Miinnehoma	Richard Dunwoody	12	11-04	11/1	Tailed off, pulled up

== Media coverage and aftermath ==
The BBC covered the race live on television for the 36th consecutive year and it was broadcast as part of a Grandstand Grand National special, presented by Des Lynam with interviews on course from Julian Wilson. Bill Smith conducted interviews in the saddling boxes and paddock in the build-up to the race, with analysis on the runners from Richard Pitman and Peter Scudamore. Four races from the Aintree card were shown live with the National being the last of the four. The three-man commentary team was unchanged for the third consecutive year with John Hanmer, Jim McGrath and lead commentator Peter O'Sullevan. Including the races he covered for BBC Radio, this was the 48th National O'Sullevan had called.

They're coming down towards the final fence. It's Royal Athlete the leader towards the right there from Romany King, and then Master Oats in third and four is Party Politics... Is this going to be another one for Jenny Pitman? They're racing towards the elbow. And it's Royal Athlete being chased now by Party Politics, a previous winner. They're coming into the final hundred yards and Royal Athlete is sprinting! Royal Athlete cannot be caught now. Royal Athlete under 24-year-old Jason Titley comes to the line to win it!

— Commentator Peter O'Sullevan describes the climax of the race

The race was also broadcast for the 64th year live on BBC Radio as part of Radio Five Live's regular Saturday sports broadcast. The race was also covered in-depth with full colour pullouts in most of the UK and Irish national newspapers.

Japanese television took great interest in the race with Tsuyoshi Tanaka being the first, and so far only, Japanese rider to weigh out for a Grand National. Tanaka's first-fence exit means that no Japanese rider has yet successfully negotiated a fence in the race though Japanese television has continued to broadcast the event live ever since.

Jason Titley was the first rider to carry a sponsor's name on the winning silks, Danka having their name emblazoned on the front of his jacket. Titley told the BBC after the race that the horse had been brilliant and only fiddled the last fence: "I never looked round but I could hear Party Politics' tube, but I thought keep going."

Trainer Jenny Pitman said that she had been proved wrong because she had told the owners they were mad to go for the Grand National because she believed Royal Athlete "could win the Scottish National [the following week] doing triple toe loops."

Animal rights demonstrators tried to disrupt the race by setting off an orange smoke bomb on the canal towpath beside the 11th fence as the runners took the Canal Turn for the second time. Most of the smoke did not make its way onto the course and the horses were able to continue without incident.

Marcus Armytage later wrote of the race in his role as a Daily Telegraph journalist on the difficulties of guiding a top weighted Gold Cup winner to victory at Aintree: "I was riding Romany King, Kim Bailey's second string in that year's National. He was something of an Aintree specialist, but who did not quite last out the National trip. He had, however, got to the stage where he could not win a hunter chase on a park course. At the third last, Master Oats' jockey, Norman Williamson, entertained hopes of winning, even though the tremendous gallop was beginning to take its toll on the horse's stamina. But imagine his surprise as he began to push and shove on the long run to the second-last, when I came past him on Romany King, sitting motionless with a double handful trying to ration my petrol so that it lasted home. 'Marcus,' he said as I sailed past him, 'what are you doing? You're not meant to be here!'"
