= 1991 Grand National =

English steeplechase horse race

- Grand National
- Location: Aintree Racecourse
- Date: 6 April 1991
- Winning horse: (New Zealand) Seagram
- Starting price: 12/1
- Jockey: (England) Nigel Hawke
- Trainer: (England) David Barons
- Owner: (England) Sir Eric Parker
- Conditions: Good to soft

External videos
- Replay of the 1991 Grand National in full Youtube

The 1991 Grand National (officially known as the Seagram Grand National for sponsorship reasons) was the 145th renewal of the Grand National horse race that took place at Aintree Racecourse near Liverpool, England, on, on 6 April 1991.

It was the last Grand National to be sponsored by Seagram, a Canadian distillery corporation that had begun sponsoring the world-famous steeplechase in 1984. Aptly, the race was won by a horse named Seagram, in a time of nine minutes and 29.9 seconds.

Cheltenham Gold Cup winner Garrison Savannah looked likely to go on and win when he jumped the 30th and final fence, four lengths clear of his nearest challenger, 11-year-old Seagram. But Seagram made up the ground on the long run-in to secure victory. There was one equine fatality in the race when Ballyhane collapsed and died after finishing.

== Leading contenders ==
Bonanza Boy was sent off as favourite despite having finished well beaten in his two previous attempts at the race. Under Peter Scudamore the horse had previously won the Welsh Grand National at Chepstow in 1988 and '89 but had pulled up in the most recent renewal when partnered by Hywel Davies. When reunited with Scudamore, Bonanza Boy bounced back by winning the Ansell's National Handicap Chase at Uttoxeter three weeks before the National. Scudamore took the ride at Aintree and was, jointly with Chris Grant, the most experienced rider in the race, both taking their eleventh National mounts. The favourite was never in contention, being well to the rear on the first circuit and always just out of reach of the leaders on the second. He picked his way through tired horses to earn fifth place. Bonanza Boy returned for a fourth attempt at the National in 1992 but his best days were behind him and he failed to complete the course for the first time. He also lined up for a fifth and final time in the void race of 1993 and retired from racing in 1994 spending his days opening fetes and local events before dying in 2011 at the age of 30.

Garrison Savannah came to Aintree bidding to be only the second horse ever, and the first for over half a century to win the Cheltenham Gold Cup and Grand National in the same year. In partnership of Mark Pitman, son of trainer Jenny Pitman, the pair were well placed throughout and turned for home disputing the lead. At the penultimate fence the Cheltenham champion kicked on and built a lead of three lengths going to the final flight, which looked decisive when his lead increased after the fence but just as he approached the elbow the horse's stride shortened dramatically and he began virtually running on the spot to be caught in the final strides by the eventual winner. In defeat Garrison Savannah has often been cited in articles and television recollections of gallant National losers and in another ironic twist, his defeat is often likened to that of Crisp in 1973 when caught on the run in similar circumstances when being ridden by Pitman's father Richard. Pitman senior also had to recall his sons fate as a BBC reporter taking viewers through a rerun of the race. Garrison Savannah returned for three further attempts at the National, including the void race of 1993 but failed to repeat his performance of his first attempt. He however remains one of just two horses since the war to have won and finished second in chasings two major events in the same season. After a happy retirement, he died in 2005 at the age of twenty-two.

Rinus shared co second favourite spot with Garrison Savannah at 7/1, largely on the back of an impressive performance when finishing third in the previous year's race. In company of Neale Doughty, himself a winning rider in 1984 he was going very well, moving up to dispute the lead when he crashed through the twentieth fence and fell, being met with a huge gasp from the crowd in the stands. it proved to be the only time in ten attempts that Doughty had failed to complete the course.

Bigsun was another who had performed well in the National the previous year to finish sixth and with former winning rider Richard Dunwoody in the saddle, was well backed to improve on that at 9/1. They were in touch with the leaders and looking like they may be about to mount a serious challenge when a very bad mistake at Becher's Brook second time saw the horse come right down on his belly. Dunwoody somehow managed to stay on board but they had been brought to a complete standstill and any hope of victory was gone. They jumped another fence before Dunwoody pulled up with Bigsun having possibly pulled a muscle in the Becher's mistake.

Seagram was naturally popular among coincidence backers who noted the horse carried the name of the sponsors though his price of 12/1 had more to do with his recent victory in the Ritz Club Chase at Cheltenham. His detractors pointed to the horse being the smallest in the field as well as being partnered with the relatively inexperienced Nigel Hawke, one of fourteen riders making the National debut. Seagram was kept in mid division during the first circuit before moving into contention early on the second. Seagram was one of five disputing the lead after jumping the Canal turn but looked to have been beaten into second at the final flight before finding a second wind to streak past the tired Garrison Savannah in the final strides to win by five lengths. His rider Nigel Hawke admitted to being overawed by the attention victory brought and later claimed that he had settled for second place when jumping the final fence. Like many National winners, Seagram failed to achieve anything of note after his victory. He returned to tackle the Aintree fences twice more, once in the National and once in the Becher chase, failing to complete the course on either occasion. The horse, once described as easily bored, was eventually retired to the hunting field until his death in 1997, aged 17.

== Finishing order ==
Position	Name	Jockey	Age	Weight	SP	Distance
1st	Seagram (NZL)	Nigel Hawke	11	10-06	12/1	Won by 5 lengths
2nd	Garrison Savannah	Mark Pitman	8	11-01	7/1	8 lengths
3rd	Auntie Dot	Mark Dwyer	10	10-04	50/1	25 lengths
4th	Over the Road	Robbie Supple	10	10-07	50/1	Short head
5th	Bonanza Boy	Peter Scudamore	10	11-07	13/2 F	1½ lengths
6th	Durham Edition	Chris Grant	13	10-13	25/1	4 lengths
7th	Golden Minstrel	Tom Grantham	12	10-02	50/1	6 lengths
8th	Old Applejack	Tim Reed	11	10-01	66/1	2 lengths
9th	Leagaune	Mark Richards	9	10-00	200/1	4 lengths
10th	Foyle Fisherman	Eamon Murphy	12	10-00	40/1	12 lengths
11th	Ballyhane	Declan Murphy	10	10-03	22/1	1½ lengths
12th	Harley I	Ger Lyons	11	10-00	150/1	30 lengths
13th	Mick's Star	Charlie Swan	11	10-00	100/1	5 lengths
14th	Ten of Spades	John White	11	11-01	15/1	
15th	Forest Ranger	Dai Tegg	9	10-00	100/1	
16th	Yahoo	Norman Williamson	10	11-01	33/1	
17th	Golden Freeze	Michael Bowlby	9	11-00	40/1	Last to complete

== Non-finishers ==
Fence	Name	Jockey	Age	Weight	SP	Fate
1st	Docklands Express	Anthony Tory	9	10-03	20/1	Fell
2nd	Run and Skip	Derek Byrne	13	10-00	66/1	Fell
5th	Envopak Token	Mark Perrett	10	10-00	28/1	Pulled up
7th (Foinavon)	Southernair I	Mr. Jose Simo	11	10-01	100/1	Unseated rider
11th (open ditch)	Joint Sovereignty	Liam O'Hara	11	10-00	100/1	Fell
15th (The Chair)	Crammer	John Durkan	11	10-02	28/1	Fell
17th	Abba Lad	Dean Gallagher	9	10-00	250/1	Pulled up
18th	Fraze (CZE)	Vaclav Chaloupka	8	11-10	100/1	Pulled up
19th (open ditch)	Master Bob	Jamie Osborne	11	10-05	20/1	Pulled up
19th (open ditch)	Team Challenge	Ben De Haan	9	10-00	50/1	Refused
20th	Rinus	Neale Doughty	10	10-07	7/1	Fell
20th	The Langholm Dyer	Graham McCourt	12	10-06	100/1	Unseated rider
21st	Mister Christian (NZL)	Simon Earle	10	10-00	100/1	Pulled up
21st	Bumbles Folly (NZL)	Jimmy Frost	10	10-05	150/1	Pulled up
21st	Solidasarock	Graham Bradley	9	10-04	50/1	Pulled up
22nd (Becher's Brook)	Mr. Frisk	Mr. Marcus Armytage	12	11-06	25/1	Pulled up
22nd (Becher's Brook)	Hotplate	Peter Niven	9	10-02	80/1	Pulled up
22nd (Becher's Brook)	Blue Dart	Hywel Davies	11	10-02	80/1	Unseated rider
23rd (Foinavon)	New Halen	Seamus O'Neill	10	10-00	50/1	Unseated rider
24th (Canal Turn)	Oklaoma (FRA)	Roland Kleparski	11	10-07	66/1	Pulled up
24th (Canal Turn)	Bigsun	Richard Dunwoody	10	10-04	9/1	Pulled up
25th (Valentine's)	Huntworth	Mr. Alan Walter	11	10-08	50/1	Pulled up
26th	General Chandos	Mr. John Bradburne	10	10-03	150/1	Pulled up

== Media coverage and aftermath ==
And it's Garrison Savannah being chased all the time by Seagram, Garrison Savannah by four lengths as they come to the elbow, from Seagram who hasn't given up! Garrison Savannah, with Seagram putting in a tremendous run! Seagram is beginning to get up on the nearside, Seagram has taken it up and he's going to win the National! Seagram, a first ride for Nigel Hawke, has won the National!

— Commentator Peter O'Sullevan describes the climax of the race

The BBC provided coverage of the race for the sixtieth time on Radio and for the thirty-second consecutive year on Television, with this year's race broadcast as part of a Grand National Grandstand special. The Television commentary team was unchanged for the twentieth consecutive year in John Hanmer, Julian Wilson and lead commentator, Peter O'Sullevan who was calling his forty-sixth Grand National. The race was broadcast live across the United Kingdom at 3.20pm.

Speaking in 1999, Hawke said of his victory: "It just all happened so quickly with Seagram that I couldn't really appreciate it. You never catch up with yourself. I wouldn't mind trying it again. I just happened to be on the right horse on the right day, which doesn't happen very often when you're a jockey. I found that out later."
