= 1994 Grand National =

English steeplechase horse race

- Grand National
- Location: Aintree Racecourse
- Date: 9 April 1994
- Winning horse: (Republic of Ireland) Miinnehoma
- Starting price: 16/1
- Jockey: (Northern Ireland) Richard Dunwoody
- Trainer: (England) Martin Pipe
- Owner: (England) Freddie Starr
- Conditions: Heavy

External videos
- 1994 Grand National in full Racing UK, BBC Sport, YouTube

The 1994 Grand National (officially known as the Martell Grand National for sponsorship reasons) was the 147th official renewal of the Grand National horse race that took place at Aintree near Liverpool, England, on 9 April 1994.

It was won in a time of 10 minutes 18.8 seconds, and by a distance of 1 1/4 lengths by 16/1 shot Miinnehoma, ridden by Northern Irish jockey Richard Dunwoody, his second Grand National victory. The winner was trained by Martin Pipe of Wellington, Somerset, and carried the red jacket with yellow star and sleeves and cap with red star of comedian Freddie Starr. The winning owner collected £115,606 of a total prize fund shared through the first five finishers of £194,000 (none of which was carried over from the aborted 1993 race). A maximum of 40 competitors were permitted but only 36 ran. All of the horses returned safely.

== Leading contenders ==
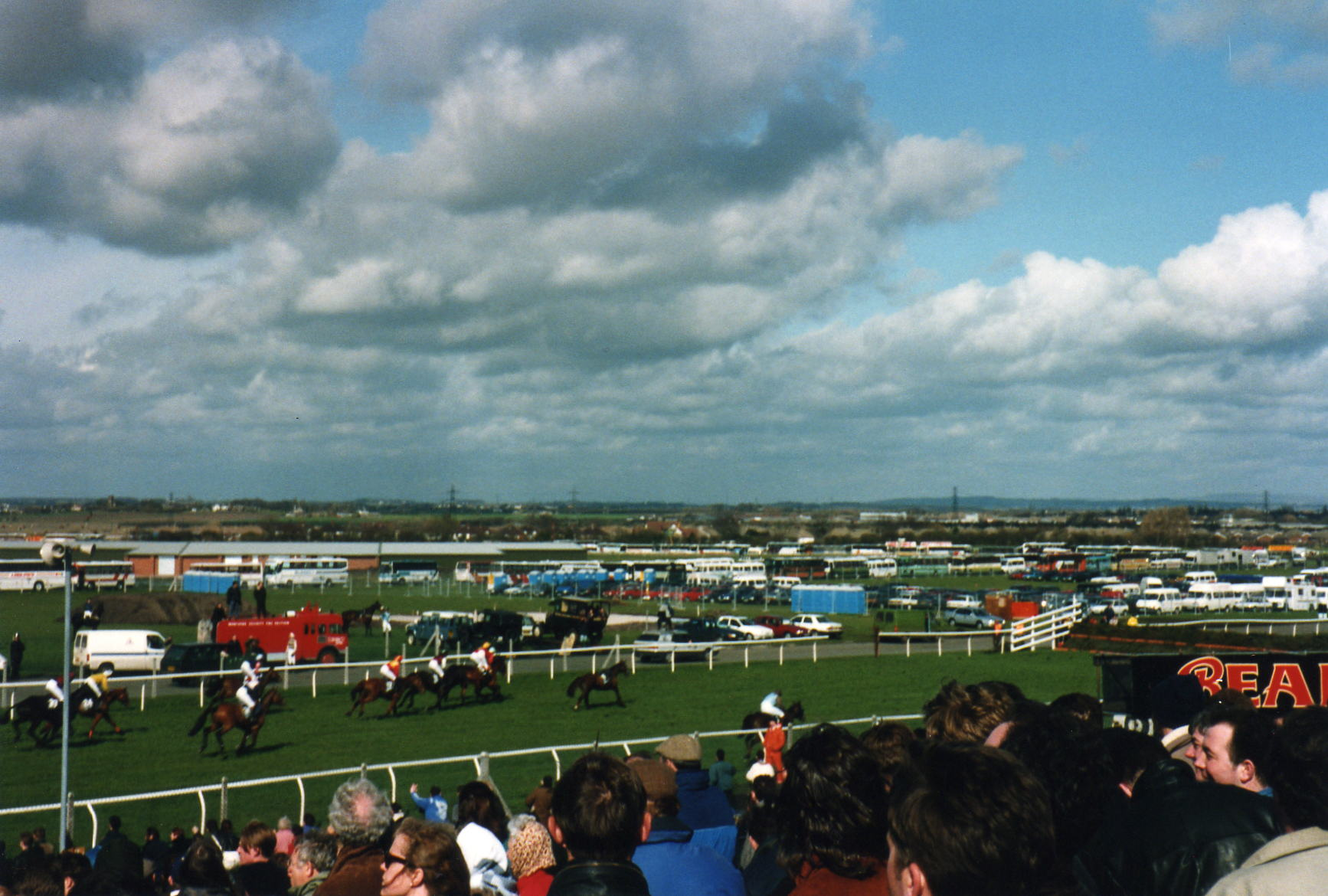
Approaching the 17th fence, from right to left: Riverside Boy, The Fellow, Miinnehoma, Garrison Savannah, Ebony Jane, Moorcroft Boy, Rust Never Sleeps, Fiddler's Pike, Into The Red and Just So

Moorcroft Boy was installed as favourite on race day after an impressive season which had seen him finish first or second in nine consecutive long-distance chases, including a victory in the Warwick National in January and a second place to Master Oats in the Greenhalls Gold Cup at Kempton in February. This impressive run and very lenient treatment from the handicapper, who allotted him nine stone and 8 lbs and ensured he would not be giving weight to any of his rivals, led the public to back him down to 5/1 at the off. Adrian Maguire who had partnered him in the most recent four of those nine outings took the mount as his second ride in the National, having also been part of the previous year's void race. Maguire was also the leading rider at the meeting with three wins going into the National, although he had been handed a three-day riding ban after the first race of the day for over use of the whip. The ban would not take effect at the Aintree meeting however.

Maguire kept the horse out of trouble in mid-division for most of the race before gradually moving through the fallers and tiring horses to lie fifth at the second jump of Becher's Brook. The favourite moved up to join the three leaders turning for home and jumped the second-last disputing the lead with Miinnehoma. When Maguire asked the horse to quicken into the last fence he jumped two lengths clear, but weakened on the 494-yard run-in to finish 21 lengths back in third. After the race it emerged that Moorcroft Boy had broken a blood vessel within strides of the last fence and raced up the run-in choking. He later suffered a broken neck when falling in the Becher Chase the following November but was nursed back to health to win the 1996 Scottish Grand National, his final race before retiring.

Double Silk was another hunter chaser who went to Aintree on the back of a run of ten consecutive victories, which included the 1993 Cheltenham and Aintree Foxhunters chases, the former of which had seen him secure a second consecutive victory over Moorcroft Boy. The remainder of his wins had been in small hunter chases before returning to Cheltenham three weeks before the National to successfully defend his Foxhunters title. Like the favourite, he was lightly treated by the handicapper, carrying ten stone and 4 lbs, and was heavily backed down to a starting price of 6/1 at the off. Amateur rider Ron Treloggan, who had partnered the horse in all of his previous fourteen starts, became one of nine riders making their Grand National debut, including future winning riders, Paul Carberry and Tony Dobbin. Double Silk was sent to the front right at the start and stayed there until the 13th fence when, for the only time in a career that spanned 31 races, he fell, having possibly been unsighted by a loose horse. Neither horse nor rider took part in the National again.

Master Oats was backed heavily after beating Moorcroft Boy in the Greenhall's Gold cup at Kempton in February and was sent off at 9/1, giving Norman Williamson his fourth ride in the race. The pair were moving up into the front rank when they fell at the 13th fence. The horse went on to win his next five races including the Welsh Grand National and Cheltenham Gold Cup.

The Fellow was aiming to be the first French-trained horse to win the race for 85 years and also the second horse ever to win the Grand National and Cheltenham Gold Cup in the same season, and was sent off at 9/1 after his victory in the Blue Ribband three weeks earlier. The French raider was providing Polish rider Adam Kondrat with his only ride in the race and was lying fourth going into the second circuit and moved up into second on the way down to Becher's Brook for the second time. Mistakes at Becher's and the 23rd saw him drop back to a close fourth when he fell at the Canal Turn. The Cheltenham champion returned to France to win the Prix Millionaire II in May.

Miinnehoma was a popular runner among locals, being owned by Liverpool comedian Freddie Starr, and was sent off at 16/1 after finishing seventh behind The Fellow in the Gold Cup. The winner of the 1992 Sun Alliance Chase at Cheltenham had lost his regular partner Peter Scudamore to retirement and had had four different riders since. Only Richard Dunwoody had won and he took the ride at Aintree as his tenth National ride, having won the race previously in 1986. The pair were prominent throughout, moving into third place at the 14th fence and then going up to dispute the lead at the start of the second circuit. Miinnehoma survived a bad mistake at Becher's second time but remained at the head of the race from there until being headed by Moorcroft Boy going to the last fence. He regained the lead when the favourite broke a blood vessel, going on to survive the late challenge of Just So to win by 1 1/4 lengths. He failed to complete the course in his defence of the title in 1995.

Mr. Boston was backed at 16/1 on the back of a quartet of long-distance victories in minor handicaps and provided Peter Niven with his fifth National ride. The pair were always towards the rear until falling at the 13th fence.

Young Hustler was also 16/1 after winning the Sun Alliance Chase and finishing third to The Fellow in the Gold Cup but lost his regular rider Carl Llewellyn to injury. David Bridgwater was drafted in to make his Grand National debut. The pair were tracking the leaders in fourth place when they were brought down by the loose running Henry Mann. Young Hustler continued riderless and actually passed the post first, coming perilously close to stopping the eventual winner at the last fence in the process.

Zeta's Lad was also sent off at 16/1 having won the Peter Marsh Chase at Haydock in January. He had previously completed a circuit of the previous year's void National before pulling up with Robbie Supple in the saddle. Supple again took the ride as his fourth National mount but the pair were never in contention and was tailed off when falling at the final fence with the horse returning lame.

== Finishing order ==
39 were declared to run but Bishop's Hall, Windy Ways and Rifle Range all scratched on the morning of the race to leave 36 starting.

Simon Morant started his first Grand National, after the retirement of Keith Brown who was partly blamed for the 1993 void race.

The parade was led by three-time winner Red Rum. The contestants had won 285 races between them, earning over £3,500,000 in their careers to that date.

Position	Name	Jockey	Age	Weight (st, lb)	Starting price	Distance	Colours
1st	Miinnehoma	Richard Dunwoody	11	10-08	16/1	Won by 1¼ lengths	Red, Yellow Star and Sleeves, Yellow Cap, Red Star
2nd	Just So	Simon Burrough	11	10-03	20/1	20 lengths	Dark Blue, Red Hoops and Armlets
3rd	Moorcroft Boy	Adrian Maguire	9	10-00	5/1 F	25 lengths	Red and Yellow (Quartered), Red Sleeves, Yellow Spots, Red Cap, Yellow Spots
4th	Ebony Jane	Liam Cusack	9	10-01	25/1	9 lengths	Maroon, Light Green Sleeves, Black Cap, Light Green star
5th	Fiddlers Pike	Mrs. Rosemary Henderson	13	10-00	100/1	A distance	Dark Blue and Pink (Quartered), Dark Blue Sleeves, Dark Blue Cap, Pink Spots
6th	Roc De Prince (FRA)	Jonothan Lower	11	10-00	100/1	Last to complete	Pink, Purple Cross-belts, Hooped Sleeves, Purple Cap

== Non-finishers ==
Fence	Name	Jockey	Age	Weight (st, lb)	Starting price	Fate	Colours
1st	Elfast	Graham McCourt	11	10-04	18/1	Fell	White, Green Sleeves and Collar, Claret Cap
1st	Fourth Of July	John Banahen	10	10-00	50/1	Fell	Light Blue, Black Seams, Quartered Cap
1st	Henry Mann	Charlie Swan	11	10-00	50/1	Fell	Dark Blue, Emerald Green Hoop, Quartered Cap
3rd	Ushers Island	Tony Dobbin	8	10-00	66/1	Unseated rider	Yellow and Maroon Chevrons, Hooped Cap
4th	Romany King	Richard Guest	10	10-01	22/1	Fell	Beige and Black Diamonds, Beige Sleeves, Beige Cap, Black Diamond
6th (Becher's Brook)	It's A Cracker	Conor O'Dwyer	10	10-00	33/1	Fell	Dark Blue, White Sleeves, Dark Blue Diamonds, White Cap, Dark blue Diamonds
6th (Becher's Brook)	Laura's Beau	Brendan Sheridan	10	10-00	40/1	Fell	Emerald Green, Orange Hoops, White Cap
6th (Becher's Brook)	New Mill House	Trevor Horgan	11	10-00	150/1	Fell	White & Emerald Green Diablo, Hooped Sleeves, White Cap
7th (Foinavon)	Gay Ruffian	Rod Farrant	8	10-00	150/1	Fell	White and Emerald Green Diablo, Hooped Sleeves and Cap
9th (Valentine's)	Captain Brandy	Kevin O'Brien	9	10-00	50/1	Unseated rider	Cream, Scarlet Sleeves, Green Cap, Brown Hoops
11th	Southern Minstrel	Mark Dwyer	11	10-01	50/1	Tailed off, pulled up	Black, Red Sleeves, Black and Red Quartered Cap
11th	Young Hustler	David Bridgwater	7	10-12	16/1	Brought down	Dark Blue, Yellow Stripe, Yellow Sleeves, Dark Blue Armlets and Star on Yellow Cap
13th	Double Silk	Mr. Ron Treloggen	10	10-04	6/1	Fell	Yellow, Red Armlets, Quartered Cap
13th	Master Oats	Norman Williamson	8	10-00	9/1	Fell	Black, Yellow Chevron, Chevrons on Sleeves
13th	Mighty Falcon	Paul Holley	9	10-00	250/1	Brought down	Black and Yellow Diamonds, Black Collar, Red and Yellow Hooped Cap
13th	Mr. Boston	Peter Niven	9	10-02	16/1	Fell	Black and White (Halved), Sleeves Reversed, Black and White Quartered Cap
13th	Topsham Bay	Jimmy Frost	11	10-11	25/1	Hampered, unseated rider	Light Blue, White Cross-belts, Red Cap
15th (The Chair)	Black Humour	Graham Bradley	10	10-12	33/1	Fell	Pink and Grey Diamonds, Pink Cap
15th (The Chair)	Quirinus (CZE)	Chiko Brecka	12	11-10	250/1	Tailed off, unseated rider	Yellow, Emerald Green Epaulets, Black and Emerald Green Hooped Sleeves, Quartered Cap
17th	Garrison Savannah	Jamie Osborne	11	10-03	25/1	Hampered, refused	Orange, Black Star, Black and Orange Striped Sleeves, Orange Cap, Black Star
17th	He Who Dares Wins	Chris Grant	10	10-00	66/1	Tailed off, pulled up	Royal Blue, White Hoops and Sleeves, Orange Cap
17th	Paco's Boy	Martin Foster	9	10-00	200/1	Tailed off, pulled up	Yellow, Black inverted triangle, Black Sleeves, Light Blue Diamonds, Black Cap
17th	Run For Free	Mark Perrett	10	11-07	25/1	Hampered, refused	Maroon, Yellow Epaulets, Armlets and Star on Cap
18th	Riverside Boy	Mark Richards	11	10-00	33/1	Refused	Light Blue, Brown Epaulets, Sleeves and Cap
19th	Channels Gate	Tom Jenks	10	10-00	100/1	Refused	Brown, Yellow Chevrons on Sleeves, Yellow Cap
24th (Canal Turn)	Mister Ed	Derek Morris	11	10-00	50/1	Tailed off, hampered, unseated rider	Royal Blue, White Star, White Sleeves, Red Armlets, Royal Blue Cap, White Star
24th (Canal Turn)	The Fellow (FRA)	Adam Kondrat	9	11-04	9/1	Fell	Red, Light Green Cap
27th	Rust Never Sleeps	Paul Carberry	10	10-00	66/1	Unseated rider	Royal Blue, Orange Sleeves, Mauve Cap, Light Green Stripes
30th	Into The Red	John White	10	10-00	25/1	Unseated rider	Yellow, White Cap, Dark Blue Star
30th	Zeta's Lad	Robbie Supple	11	10-13	16/1	Tailed off, fell	Royal Blue, White Star, White Stars on Sleeves and Cap

== Media coverage and aftermath ==
The race was broadcast live on BBC One in the United Kingdom for the 35th consecutive year as part of its regular Saturday afternoon sports programme Grandstand. The entire five-hour-long programme was presented from the course as a Grand National Grandstand special, presented by Des Lynam, and featured interviews with the connections of the runners and features on some of the competitors as well as looking back at the history of the race and interviews with celebrities and racegoers on the course.

It's Moorcroft Boy from Miinnehoma as they come to the elbow but it's still wide open. It's Moorcroft Boy and Miinnehoma and Miinnehoma's travelling the stronger now. Miinnehoma on the far side, and Just So renewing his challenge towards the nearside. It's Miinnehoma now from Just So. Miinnehoma with Just So putting in a tremendous challenge towards the near side! Miinnehoma and Just So as they race towards the line. Miinnehoma is going to win the National from Just So! Miinnehoma has won it! Just So is second and third is Moorcroft Boy.

— Commentator Peter O'Sullevan describes the climax of the race

Three other races on the Aintree card were broadcast on the programme before Lynam handed over to Richard Pitman and Peter Scudamore who presented the build-up to the big race itself, which included live scenes from inside the jockeys' weighing room. Bill Smith also interviewed many of the connections of the runners in the saddling boxes and paddock before the race, while betting shows were read by Graham Rock. Julian Wilson was at the start in case any incidents similar to the false start of the previous year occurred. Once the runners were on the course and had paraded, the commentary was handed over to Jim McGrath, John Hanmer and lead commentator Peter O'Sullevan who was commentating a National for the BBC for the 49th time and had called home the winners of all the televised Nationals.

Lynam conducted the post-race interviews with trainer Martin Pipe and jockey Richard Dunwoody as well as the first instance of an interview over a mobile phone as Lynam talked briefly with owner and comedian Freddie Starr in front of a bemused audience unable to hear Starr's comments. Pipe explained that Starr had been unable to attend Aintree due to television commitments. Lynam also interviewed Rosemary Henderson who, at the age of 52, became the first woman to collect Grand National prize money by coming fifth on Fiddlers Pike.

Pitman, Scudamore and Smith then guided viewers through a slow motion re-run of the race using camera angles not used during the race itself to show viewers who had not backed the winner where their money went. Wilson then confirmed all the finishers and fallers, also revealing that all the riders had returned safely. It later emerged that Zeta's Lad had returned lame while Moorcroft Boy had broken down on the run-in.

The race was also broadcast live on BBC Radio for the 63rd time, while preview pullouts were published in most major national newspapers, most in colour.

Liam Cusack reported that his mount Ebony Jane had been almost stopped by a loose horse during the race.

Rosemary Henderson became only the second woman ever to complete the course and the first to finish in the top six when coming fifth on Fiddlers Pike. Henderson, an amateur rider in her early fifties, had been labelled the 'Galloping Grandmother' by the press in the build-up to the race. After the race she said: "I'm almost ashamed to say it but I'm not very puffed after that. Perhaps I didn't try hard enough. He jumped very big over the first three or four fences but after that he really settled into it. We stayed out wide to avoid trouble but also because I thought the ground was better. There were a few that fell in front of us but he's very clever, although I think we trampled on someone who fell. I didn't see him in time. It's the experience of a lifetime and I'm so glad were weren't tailed off."

In an interview with Des Lynam on Grandstand Adrian Maguire, who rode Moorcroft Boy, said: "I can't really be too annoyed because we've finished third but he ran a great race and just got very tired after the last." When asked if he thought at any stage he was going to win he replied, "No, I jumped the last very well and got a length on Richard [Dunwoody] but could always see he was filling the tank up. That's why I kicked down to the last and hoped he'd stay galloping but Richard had too much guns for me. I was quite lucky with a couple of fallers, especially The Fellow. I'd just jumped the fence on the inside of him and lucky enough he rolled outwards."

Dunwoody's victory in the National helped seal one of the closest jockey's titles for year as he finished just three wins ahead of Adrian Maguire at the end of the season as champion jockey.

Just So (1983) finished sixth (1992) and second (1994) in his only two appearances round the Grand National course. He was owned by Henry T Cole from the west country.
