= 1989 Grand National =

English steeplechase horse race

- Grand National
- Location: Aintree Racecourse
- Date: 8 April 1989
- Winning horse: (Northern Ireland) Little Polveir
- Starting price: 28/1
- Jockey: (England) Jimmy Frost
- Trainer: (United States) Toby Balding
- Owner: Edward Harvey
- Conditions: Heavy

External videos
- 1989 Grand National in full (BBC)
- Replay and analysis of the 1989 Grand National (BBC)

The 1989 Grand National (officially known as the Seagram Grand National for sponsorship reasons) was the 143rd renewal of the Grand National horse race that took place at Aintree Racecourse near Liverpool, England, on 8 April 1989.

The race was won in a time of 10 minutes 6.9 seconds and by a distance of 7 lengths by Irish 12-year-old Little Polveir, ridden by jockey Jimmy Frost. West Tip was second and The Thinker finished third. Fourteen of the 40 runners completed the course.

The winner had been sold by a four-way partnership six weeks before the race to Edward Harvey. It was Little Polveir's fourth attempt at the Grand National; he was sent off at odds of 28/1. Jockey Frost's son, Hadden, attempted to emulate his father's victory 22 years later by riding Calgary Bay in the 2011 Grand National; he fell at the fourth fence. Jimmy Frost's daughter, Bryony, then rode in the 2018 Grand National on Milansbar; she came in fifth place.

There were two equine fatalities during the race, both at Becher's Brook. The deaths came two years after the dramatic fatal fall of the popular grey Dark Ivy at Becher's in 1987. Following an outcry, Aintree took significant measures to reduce the severity of the fence.

The main race was seen by a record Grand National crowd at Aintree, with 74,189 people in attendance, over 8,500 more than the previous year, and it would not be until the Monday race of 1997 that a larger crowd would attend the main race day.

== Leading contenders ==
Dixton House was backed down from 33/1 to 7/1 favourite after he won the National Hunt Handicap Chase at Cheltenham a few weeks before Aintree, helping his rider, Tom Morgan, to the leading rider's trophy at the festival in the process. Morgan, having his fifth ride in the Grand National, took the favourite to the front going to Becher's Brook for the first time, only to crumple on landing and exit the contest. Dixton House only ever returned to a racecourse once more, in January 1990, when he pulled up lame and was subsequently retired while Morgan also never raced in the National again.

Durham Edition had been prepared by trainer Arthur Stephenson specifically with the Grand National in mind after his second-place finish the previous year. A proven ability to be at the business end of the National ensured plenty of public support to be sent off at 15/2. In addition, he was to be partnered, as last year, by Chris Grant, jointly the most experienced rider in the race, weighing out for his ninth National. The pair ran what was considered at the time by many in racing to be a textbook Grand National: hunting around the first circuit in mid-division before gradually moving through the field on the second; always in touch, they moved into the rear of a leading group of seven at the Canal Turn on the second circuit, tracking the group until moving up onto the tail of the leader over the final two fences. When asked to quicken however, Grant found his mount to be a spent force and instead of closing on the leader he was swallowed up by other stronger finishers, coming home in fifth place. The pair would return in 1990 for a third attempt at the race together.

Bonanza Boy had won the Welsh Grand National at Chepstow four months earlier before going on to win the Racing Post Chase in even more impressive style. These two victorious performances on ground getting close to the conditions at Aintree in the week leading up to the National led the public to discount a modest performance in the recent Cheltenham Gold Cup and back him to win at 10/1. His regular rider, Peter Scudamore who, like Grant was taking his tenth ride in the race was hoping to finally win the race for the first time. Scudamore guided his mount through the first circuit to sit among the leading half a dozen contestants as they started out for the second circuit but soon after jumping the Canal Turn it could be seen that Bonanza Boy was being given reminders. They turned for home a close up fourth but as they came to the second last flight it became clear that he was unlikely to win, dropping out of contention by the final flight before making the best of their way home in eighth place. Bonanza Boy returned to Chepstow eight months later to retain his Welsh National crown before embarking on another attempt at Aintree.

The Thinker was bidding to be only the third Cheltenham Gold Cup winner in history to complete the Grand National double, having been crowned the Champion Chaser in 1987. The former Gold Cup winner came to Aintree after finishing third in the Welsh National, behind Bonanza Boy but then fell when trying to score a second Gold Cup the month before the National. That race had been won by Simon Sherwood aboard Desert Orchid but with the Cheltenham Champion not sent to Aintree, Sherwood took the ride on The Thinker in a bid to complete the double in the same season. Despite being given the top weight of 11 stone 10 lbs, The Thinker was backed down to 10/1 at the off but for most of the race it looked as if they would fare no better than to complete the course. At the Canal Turn on the second circuit they were a good ten lengths adrift of the leading group of eight and seemed only to be making modest headway as they crossed the Anchor Bridge crossing. On the run to the second last flight however the top weight made relentless progress to not only catch the group ahead of him but start to work through them, taking the penultimate flight in fourth place, albeit crashing through the fence and nearly falling. Sherwood was able to gather The Thinker up and took the final flight in third place, quickly reeling in Durham Edition to move into second place but at the elbow their challenge began to falter and they passed the post a length down on the runner up in third. The Thinker was yet again burdened with top weight for the 1990 Grand National only to be withdrawn on the eve of the race. Worse was to follow in 1991, when the horse was backed down to 16/1, despite being thirteen years old. In company with Chris Grant he was cantering at Aintree on the Thursday before the race when he shattered a leg and had to be destroyed.

West Tip was by now a people's champion after following up his 1986 Grand National victory with fourth-placed finishes in 1987 and 1988 after falling at his first attempt in 1985. As in all his previous Nationals he was partnered by Richard Dunwoody. West Tip went into the front rank right from the off and led the field over the Chair at the half way stage. They were headed by the eventual winner on the way down to Becher's Brook for the second time and looked to a beaten horse, dropping back to fifth as the leaders turned for the second last fence. Dunwoody was able to find a second wind from the former National winner jumping the final fence as they moved into second place before being outpaced by the eventual winner.

Others widely supported on the day were 1986 Welsh National winner, Stearsby at 14/1, Lastofthebrownies and Perris Valley at 16/1, the latter of which provided Brendan Sheridan with the best fancied ride of the sixteen jockeys making their debut in the race. Former National winner Neale Doughty took the mount on Gala's Image which started at 18/1 with the 1988 Lord Mildmay of Fleet winner, Smart Tar. Last year's third placed Monanore was considered an excellent each-way chance at 20/1 while fifth placed Attitude Adjuster started at the longer odds of 25/1 with Bob Tisdall and Gainsay, the latter of which being owned by Errol Brown, better known as the lead singer of the popular 1970s and 1980s pop group, Hot Chocolate. Little Polveir was allowed to go off at the modest odds of 28/1, despite having won the Scottish Grand National in 1987. This would be the horse's fourth, and surely final attempt at a race he had completed in tenth place in 1987 before falling in each of the last two Nationals, the latter of which had seen him leading when unseating his rider five fences from the finish. Jimmy Frost took the mount as his debut ride in the race with many newspaper tipsters suggesting that the pair would part company during the race. Frost kept Little Polveir among the leading dozen on the first circuit, moving up to take the lead as the field jumped the water at the end of the first circuit. They were never again headed and after the fall of Smart Tar at the twenty-first fence, maintained a lead of at least three lengths for the rest of the race.

== Finishing order ==
Position	Name	Jockey	Age	Weight	SP	Distance
1st	Little Polveir	Jimmy Frost	12	10-03	28/1	Won by 7 lengths
2nd	West Tip	Richard Dunwoody	12	10–11	12/1	½ length
3rd	The Thinker	Simon Sherwood	11	11–10	10/1	6 lengths
4th	Lastofthebrownies	Tommy Carmody	9	10-00	16/1	5 lengths
5th	Durham Edition	Chris Grant	11	10–11	15/2	8 lengths
6th	Monanore	Graham McCourt	12	10-06	20/1	2½ lengths
7th	Gala's Image	Neale Doughty	9	10-03	18/1	1½ lengths
8th	Bonanza Boy	Peter Scudamore	8	11-01	10/1	4 lengths
9th	Team Challenge	Michael Bowlby	7	10-00	30/1	15 lengths
10th	Newnham	Mr. Simon Andrews	12	10-05	50/1	25 lengths
11th	The Thirsty Farmer	Lars Kelp	10	10-02	100/1	
12th	Attitude Adjuster	Niall Madden	9	10-06	25/1	
13th	Sidbury Hill	Kevin Mooney	13	10-00	100/1	
14th	Mr. Baker	Michael Moran	11	10-00	100/1	Last to complete

== Non-finishers ==
Fence	Name	Jockey	Age	Weight	SP	Fate
1st	Cerimau	Peter Hobbs	11	10-00	80/1	Fell
2nd	Cranlome	Kevin O'Brien	11	10-00	66/1	Fell
2nd	Bob Tisdall	John White	10	10-07	25/1	Refused
6th (Becher's Brook)	Hettinger	Ray Goldstein	9	10-00	300/1	Fell
6th (Becher's Brook)	Sir Jest	Mickey Hammond	11	10-01	40/1	Brought down
6th (Becher's Brook)	Dixton House	Tom Morgan	10	10-03	7/1 F	Fell
6th (Becher's Brook)	Sergeant Sprite	Tom Taaffe	9	10-02	50/1	Fell
6th (Becher's Brook)	Brown Trix	Mr. David Pitcher	11	10-05	300/1	Fell
6th (Becher's Brook)	Seeandem	Liam Cusack	9	10-00	100/1	Fell
11th (open ditch)	Friendly Henry	Hywel Davies	9	10-04	66/1	Fell
11th (open ditch)	Perris Valley	Brendan Sheridan	8	10-00	16/1	Fell
11th (open ditch)	Stearsby	Brendan Powell	10	10-09	14/1	Refused
15th (The Chair)	Smartside	Mr. Al Hambly	14	10-05	300/1	Refused
16th (Water Jump)	Mr. Chris	Brian Storey	10	10-00	200/1	Fell
18th	Beamwam	Mr. David Naylor-Leyland	11	10-06	100/1	Pulled up
19th (open ditch)	Gainsay	Mark Pitman	10	10-06	25/1	Fell
19th (open ditch)	Queensway Boy	Alan Webb	10	10-00	50/1	Refused
20th	Smart Tar	Carl Llewellyn	8	10-03	18/1	Fell
21st	Mearlin	Simon McNeill	10	10-00	300/1	Pulled up
21st	Numerate	Tarnya Davis	10	10-00	100/1	Pulled up
25th (Valentine's)	Polar Nomad	Alan Merrigan	8	10-00	80/1	Pulled up
25th (Valentine's)	Bartres	Graham Bradley	10	10-03	33/1	Pulled up
27th (open ditch)	Kersil	Andrew Orkney	12	10-00	300/1	Pulled up
28th	Rausal	Dai Tegg	10	10-00	50/1	Refused
28th	Memberson	Guy Upton	11	10-02	33/1	Pulled up
28th	Mithras	Robert Stronge	11	10-01	66/1	Pulled up

== Media coverage and aftermath ==
Racing into the final 225 yards it's Little Polveir from The Thinker. West Tip is putting in a great challenge on the far side. Lastofthebrownies is finishing well, but Little Polvier is homing in and is gonna win it. Little Polveir has a riderles horse to beat, and Little Polveir has won it!

— Commentator Peter O'Sullevan describes the climax of the race

The BBC broadcast the race live on television for the thirtieth consecutive year as part of its regular Saturday afternoon Grandstand programme, in a Grand National special. Des Lynam was the anchor presenter. Former Grand National jockeys, Richard Pitman and Bill Smith provided background and build up to all the races on the card including the National. The television commentary team was unchanged for the eighteenth consecutive year in John Hanmer, Julian Wilson and lead commentator, Peter O'Sullevan who was calling his forty-fourth Grand National.

The BBC, and in particular Julian Wilson and Richard Pitman came in for heavy criticism from the general public for their handling of an incident at Becher's Brook on the first circuit which left two horses having to be euthanised. Seeandem, ridden by Liam Cusack, broke his back in a horrific fall at the fence while Brown Trix, ridden by amateur jockey David Pitcher, fell into the water-filled brook, fracturing a shoulder, and being saved from drowning by his rider jumping into the brook to support his head until he could be freed.

By the time the remaining runners reached the fence on the second circuit, course officials had not yet been able to remove Seeandem's body, while Brown Trix still lay in a distressed state by the fence, which had been partly dolled off, meaning television viewers clearly saw the tarpaulin covering Seeandem's body by the inside edge of the fence, and Brown Trix laying mortally injured on the outside. These images were shown again in the post-race analysis, and during the race, commentator Julian Wilson compounded the incident by pointing out to viewers that the runners had to avoid "a dead horse", and in the post-race analysis Richard Pitman had said Brown Trix had "got up after a short rest, only winded".

While the comments of the two commentators caused many complaints among viewers, it was the BBC's decision to show the incident again in slow motion in the post race review, covered by Pitman and Smith, which created the bigger outcry. In addition, when the BBC screened its Scheduled late evening highlights programme, they received further criticism for showing the race in full and not editing out the field jumping Becher's Brook on both circuits with Wilson's original commentary omitted from the highlights footage.

Following an outcry, and further to criticisms following Dark Ivy's fatal fall in the 1987 Grand National, a question of the future safety of the race was raised in the House of Commons.

In response Aintree made several changes to Becher's, including levelling-off the slope on the landing side and raising the brook itself to contain only one inch of water. Security on the course was also tightened after another incident in the later stages of the race where a group of intoxicated youths ran onto the course and were seen to be playing chicken with the runners as they turned towards the second last fence.

Further criticisms were raised by some of the riders in the race itself that amateur rider David Pitcher had been allowed to take part at all. Pitcher, who had only a few years riding experience, had set off in an alarming manner on board his mount Brown Trix, diving the horse alarmingly at the third fence in particular. The criticism was heightened by the fact that Brown Trix was one of the two horses to suffer fatal falls. On viewing a playback of the race, champion jockey Peter Scudamore was scathing in his criticism when he stated "I like David Pitcher. He's a nice man and as a person I've got a lot of time for him. But, in my view, he had no right to ride in the Grand National.... He's a bad tactician and, as far as I could see, he had no race plans. He just rode like a maniac down over those first three or four fences and, to me, that's not fearless. It's brainless. He rides a horse like he's swinging from the heels against West Indian fast-bowling." Pitcher did not help his cause by stating "What could the best jockey in the world do about his horse falling back into the ditch? In National Hunt racing, you learn to live with dead horses."

Aintree responded by bringing in tighter qualifying regulations for amateur riders for the following year. Pitcher himself had to be treated in hospital for biting through his tongue and bottom lip in his fall, while Ray Goldstein was also taken to hospital after being left unconscious and suffering concussion, having been one of four other riders to fall at Becher's Brook on the first circuit.

Little Polveir ran just four more times over fences, being beaten twice by Bonanza Boy, including the 1989 Welsh Grand National. In his final race in January 1990 he was pulled up and promptly retired. Jimmy Frost competed in a further four Grand Nationals without success before retiring from the saddle to become a trainer. His son Hadden and daughter Bryony later also rode in the Grand National.

In August 2007 the Sheffield-based band Monkey Swallows the Universe released a single named Little Polveir, named after the Grand National winner, although the song is not actually about the horse, nor mentions him in the lyrics. As coincidence had it, the band were signed to a record label owned by the son in law of Little Polveir's trainer, Toby Balding
