= 1993 Grand National =

1993 horse race, voided after a false start

- Grand National
- Location: Aintree
- Date: 3 April 1993
- Winning horse: None
- Jockey: None
- Trainer: None
- Owner: None
- Conditions: Good to firm

External videos
- 1993 Grand National on YouTube

The 1993 Grand National (officially the Martell Grand National Chase Handicap Grade 3) was scheduled on 3 April 1993 to be the 147th running of the Grand National horse race, held annually at Aintree Racecourse near Liverpool, England.

It was the first and so far only time that the steeplechase was declared void, after 30 of the 39 runners began and carried on racing despite there having been a false start. Seven of the field even went on to complete the course, with Esha Ness crossing the finishing post first, in what would have been the second-fastest time.

The Jockey Club decided not to re-run the race, and as a result it has often been called "the race that never was". Bookmakers were forced to refund an estimated £75 million in bets staked. The Jockey Club launched an inquiry which led to a number of changes in the starting and recall procedures in future races.

== Circumstances ==
=== False start ===
And they're away – oh, and once again the tape has snagged, and it's a recall... It was caught round Richard Dunwoody's neck, the tape. And they've been recalled – but the majority don't realise that it is a recall! They're going down to jump the first, they're going to!

— The BBC's lead commentator Peter O'Sullevan describes the second false start.

The meeting at Aintree had been beset by problems before the race. Fifteen animal rights protesters invaded the course near the first fence (as had also happened at the 1991 Grand National) resulting in a delayed start. A first false start was caused by several riders becoming tangled in the starting tape. Starter Keith Brown, who was officiating his last National before retirement, waved his red recall flag and a second official, Ken Evans, who was situated 100 yards further down the track, in turn signalled to the leading runners to turn around. At the second attempt, the tape became tangled again – around the neck of jockey Richard Dunwoody – and Brown called another false start. However, this time his recall flag did not unfurl as he waved it. As a result, Evans failed to appear and 30 of the 39 riders set off around the track, oblivious to the recall.

=== First circuit ===
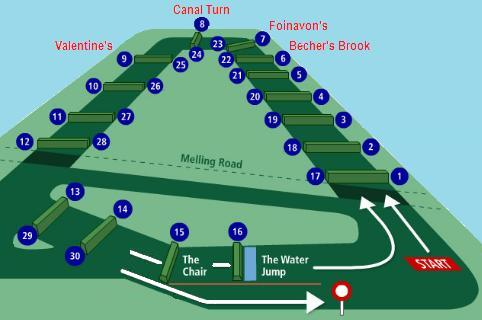
A map of the National Course at Aintree.

Officials, trainers and the crowd tried desperately to halt the race, but the majority of the field continued racing. By the Becher's Brook (the sixth fence) only one of the 30 still competing had fallen: outsider Farm Week at the fourth, who hampered David's Duky in the process.

Royal Athlete had gained popularity with the public after finishing third in the Cheltenham Gold Cup and was sent to post at 17/2, providing Ben de Haan, the 1983 winning jockey, with his 11th and final ride in the race. He fell at Valentine's (the ninth).

One fence later, outsider Senator Snugfit fell. The BBC's commentary team, consisting of Peter O'Sullevan, John Hanmer and Jim McGrath continued to describe proceedings, periodically reminding viewers that "it's got to be a void race".

It was not until the water jump – the final fence of the first circuit – that many riders became aware of the situation and pulled up, including champion jockey Peter Scudamore on Captain Dibble, Garrison Savannah, and Zeta's Lad, who was widely considered by tipsters as the form horse in the field, having raced unbeaten in his five starts that season, including beating Romany King in the Racing Post Chase at Kempton two months prior. Most of the horses at the rear were pulled up too, including Stay on Tracks, David's Duky, Direct, Mister Ed and the tailed-off Quirinus.

Captain Dibble was the Scottish Grand National winner in 1992 and vied for favouritism for the Grand National until a few days before the race. Scudamore had turned down a host of competitors to take the ride in his 13th National, and the pair were sent off at 9/1. Scudamore saw trainer Martin Pipe waving at him near the water jump to stop. The jockey had never won the National in his previous 12 attempts, and retired from racing a short time later.

Party Politics, who won the 1992 Grand National with partner Carl Llewellyn, was also pulled up after the water jump when in a good position. Since his Aintree victory the previous April he had run unimpressively in two chases without Llewellyn in the saddle before they were reunited to win the Greenhalls Gold Cup at Haydock in February. As defending champion, and with his jockey taking his fourth ride in a Grand National, the horse was popular with the public who had backed him down to 7/1 favourite at the start.

=== Second circuit ===
Fourteen horses continued racing onto the second circuit, led by Sure Metal and Howe Street who between them held a decent lead until they both fell at the 20th fence.

This put Romany King into the lead, which he held on to until being passed at the final fence and finishing third. The horse had been narrowly beaten by Party Politics in the previous year's National but had won just one of his six races since, a moderate event at Exeter in November. He shared pre-race favouritism with Party Politics until shortly before the start when he drifted to 15/2 joint-second favourite. His Irish jockey, Adrian Maguire, was one of nine riders making their debut in the race.

One fence later, at the 21st, Joyful Noise refused, Paco's Boy fell, as did the tailed-off The Gooser. Interim Lib unseated his rider at the Canal Turn and a tailed-off Bonanza Boy refused at the same fence. Seven runners remained and went on to complete the course: Romany King, The Committee, Esha Ness, Cahervillahow, Givus A Buck, On The Other Hand and a distant Laura's Beau. As they crossed the Melling Road before approaching the penultimate fence, commentator Peter O'Sullevan declared the unfolding events "the greatest disaster in the history of the Grand National."

So as they race up to the line, in the National that surely isn't, Esha Ness is the winner, second is Cahervillahow, third is Romany King, four The Committee and five is Givus A Buck. Then comes On The Other Hand and Laura's Beau and they are the only ones to have completed in the race that surely never was.

— Peter O'Sullevan describes the climax of the 'race'.

As they came to the elbow, on the 494-yard run-in to home, Cahervillahow, Romany King, The Committee and Esha Ness remained tight and vying for position. But it was 50/1 shot Esha Ness, ridden by John White, trained by Jenny Pitman and owned by Patrick Bancroft, who crossed the line first, in the second-fastest time in Grand National history. Cahervillahow came home second despite trailing in fourth at the elbow, Romany King was third and The Committee fourth. Givus A Buck completed in fifth, with On The Other Hand and Laura's Beau completing the seven finishers of the National that never was.

=== Aftermath ===
Initially there was confusion as to what would happen next. Keith Brown, the race starter, was interviewed briefly by the BBC and alluded to the possibility that the nine jockeys who noticed and obeyed his recall could be eligible to take part in a re-run. Several jockeys said that they thought the officials attempting to stop them were actually protestors. Esha Ness's jockey John White said of the latter stages of the race: "I could see there were only a few horses around, but I thought the others had fallen or something."

Romany King's jockey Adrian Maguire said: "Going to The Chair, I wondered what the hell was going on because I saw a fellow wandering nonchalantly across the fence. There were two cones in front of it, but the horses still in the race all kept going."

The Jockey Club later declared the race void, ruled out any re-running of it, and launched an inquiry. Bookmakers were forced to refund an estimated £75 million in bets staked.

Zeta's Lad trainer John Upson was among those trainers who were particularly angry, feeling, correctly as it transpired, that this was his only chance to have a leading contender in a National. Before the race Upson had said: "I'm not someone who always thinks their horse is going to win, but this year I just have a feeling." The horse was in mid-division taking the water jump but was instantly pulled up as jockey Robbie Supple, riding in his third National, realised the race was not on. Upson later revealed: "The reason I really blew my top was, that once the initial fiasco had happened, there was the starter standing there saying, 'Right, I'm disqualifying everything, apart from the nine that didn't go. I'll start the race again with nine runners.' At that stage I just thought the world had gone completely mad. The adrenaline was going and I was jumping up and down."

== Investigation ==
An inquiry was chaired by High Court judge Sir Michael Connell, the deputy senior steward of the Jockey Club since 1988. His report apportioned some blame to Keith Brown for allowing the horses to get too close to the tape, but most blame to Ken Evans, the official further down the track, for failing to notice the second false start. Brown retired later that year and said: "It was very sad for all concerned. Whatever could go wrong that day did."

A working group produced a 34-page report with recommendations following the official inquiry, which was approved by the Jockey Club. Considerable public discussion had arisen over the possibility of introducing electronic devices, such as horns or flashing lights, to provide a fail-safe starting and recall system. The use of modern technology however was dismissed on the basis of a lack of total success overseas, and being open to sabotage and technical failure.

The tape at the start line was made more sturdy, consisting of three strands instead of one, and in a more distinctive pattern; the width of the start was also reduced. If a false start is called, two officials (in contact with the starter by radio) will wave fluorescent yellow flags at jockeys. Further up the course, a third official will be positioned so as to arrest those who fail to notice the two initial flags. If necessary, the third official will follow the field in a car to stop them.

Andrew Parker Bowles, who chaired the working group which produced the recommendations, said he was confident that the exceptional circumstances of the 1993 National would never be repeated: "You start 7,000 races a year with flagmen and it went wrong just three times last year, but one of them was the Grand National. It won't happen again."

== Race card ==
Name	Jockey	Age	Handicap (st-lb)	SP	Fate
Quirinus (CZE)	J Brecka	11	11-10	300/1	Fence 17, pulled up
Garrison Savannah	Mark Pitman	10	11-08	10/1	Fence 16, pulled up
Chatam (USA)	Jonothon Lower	9	11-07	28/1	Did not start
Party Politics	Carl Llewellyn	9	11-02	7/1 F	Fence 17, pulled up
Cahervillahow	C Swan	9	10-11	25/1	Completed, 2nd
Captain Dibble	P Scudamore	8	10-08	9/1	Fence 17, pulled up
Romany King	A Maguire	9	10-07	15/2	Completed, 3rd
Roc de Prince (FRA)	Graham McCourt	10	10-06	66/1	Did not start
Royle Speedmaster	John Durkan	9	10-05	200/1	Did not start
Zeta's Lad	Robbie Supple	10	10-04	15/2	Fence 17, pulled up
Royal Athlete	Ben de Haan	11	10-04	17/2	Fence 10, fell
Interim Lib	Mr. J Bradburne	10	10-04	200/1	Fence 24, unseated rider
On The Other Hand	Neale Doughty	10	10-03	20/1	Completed, 6th
Direct	Peter Niven	10	10-03	100/1	Fence 16, pulled up
Latent Talent	J Osborne	9	10-02	28/1	Did not start
Nos Na Gaoithe	Russ Garritty	10	10-02	66/1	Did not start
Travel Over	Mr. M Armytage	12	10-02	100/1	Fence 2, pulled up
Wont Be Gone Long	R Dunwoody	11	10-01	16/1	Did not start
Joyful Noise	T Jarvis	10	10-01	150/1	Fence 20, refused
Farm Week	Simon Hodgson	11	10-01	200/1	Fence 4, fell
Givus A Buck	Paul Holley	10	10-00	16/1	Completed, 5th
Laura's Beau	Conor O'Dwyer	9	10-00	20/1	Completed, 7th
The Committee	N Williamson	10	10-00	25/1	Completed, 4th
Mister Ed	Derrick Morris	10	10-00	25/1	Fence 17, pulled up
Riverside Boy	Mark Perrett	10	10-00	28/1	Fence 17, pulled up
Kildimo	Lorcan Wyer	13	10-00	40/1	Did not start
Esha Ness	John White	10	10-00	50/1	Completed, 1st
Stay on Tracks	Kenny Johnson	11	10-00	50/1	Fence 17, pulled up
Rowlandsons Jewels	Dean Gallagher	12	10-00	50/1	Fence 17, pulled up
Sure Metal	Seamus O'Neill	10	10-00	50/1	Fence 20, fell
Howe Street	Andy Orkney	10	10-00	66/1	Fence 20, fell
The Gooser	K O'Brien	10	10-00	50/1	Fence 21, fell
New Mill House	Trevor Horgan	10	10-00	66/1	Fence 18, pulled up
Bonanza Boy	Simon McNeill	12	10-00	100/1	Fence 24, refused
David's Duky	M Brennan	11	10-00	100/1	Fence 17, pulled up
Paco's Boy	M Foster	8	10-00	100/1	Fence 20, fell
Formula One	Mrs. J Davies	11	10-00	200/1	Did not start
Senator Snugfit (USA)	Peter Hobbs	8	10-00	200/1	Fence 11, fell
Tarqogan's Best	Barney Clifford	13	10-00	500/1	Did not start
