= Becher's Brook =

British horse race fence

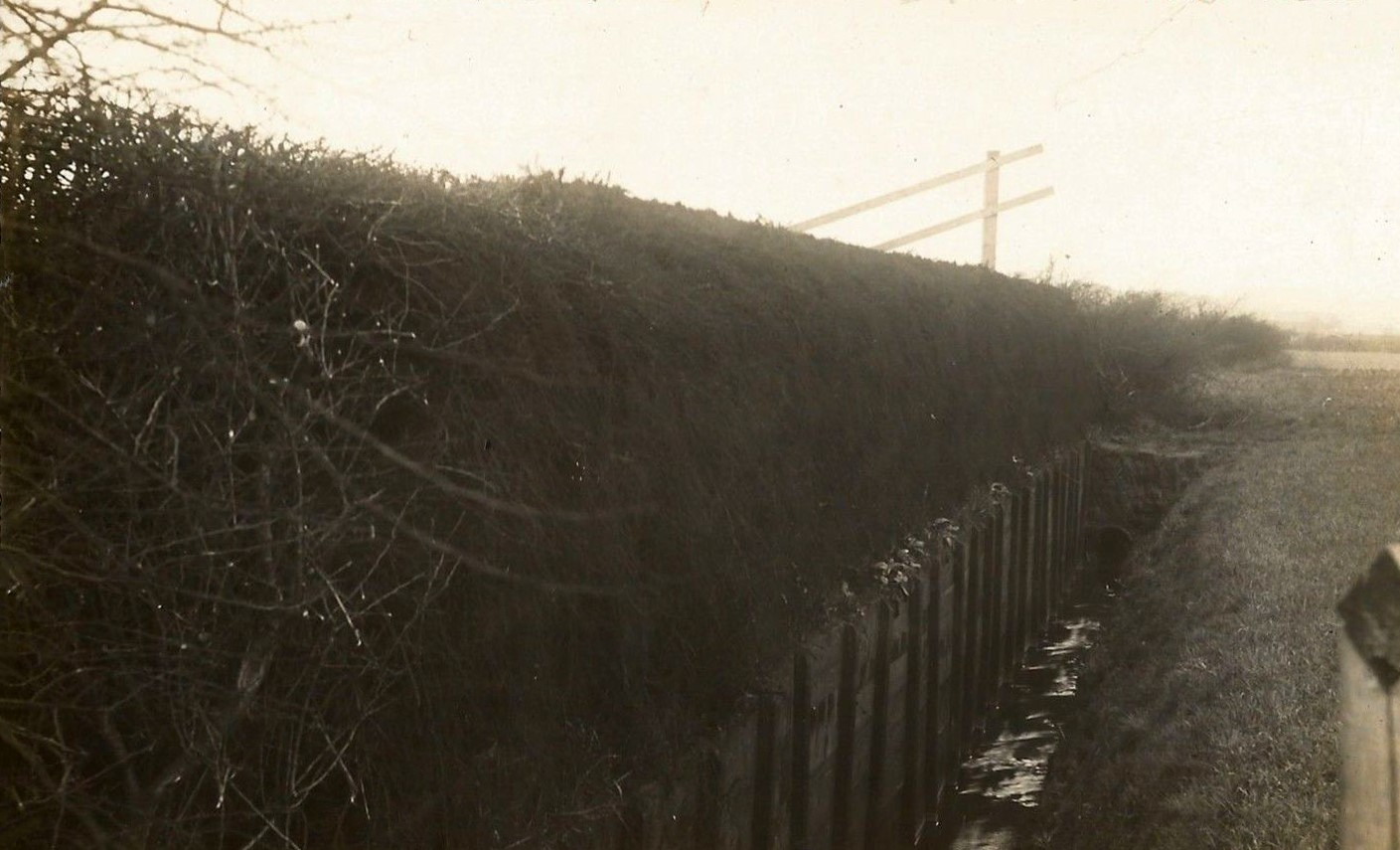
Becher's Brook before the modifications were made to the fence

Becher's Brook (/ˈbiːtʃərz/ BEECH-ərz) is a fence jumped during the Grand National, a National Hunt horse race held annually at Aintree Racecourse near Liverpool, England. It is jumped twice during the race, as the 6th and 22nd fence, as well as on four other occasions during the year. It has always been a notorious and controversial obstacle, because of the size and angle of the 6-foot-9-inch (2.06 m) drop on the landing side. Some jockeys have compared it to "jumping off the edge of the world."

After the deaths of Dark Ivy in the 1987 Grand National, Seeandem and Brown Trix in the 1989 Grand National, all at Becher's Brook, Aintree bowed to pressure from animal rights groups and undertook extensive modifications to the fence. Further changes were made after two horses, Ornais and Dooneys Gate, died during the 2011 Grand National, the latter at Becher's. The incident involving Dooneys Gate resulted in the fence being jumped only once for the first time in the race's history; it was bypassed on the outside on the second circuit while veterinary staff attended to him.

== History ==
The fence took its name from Captain Martin Becher, who fell there from his mount, Conrad, in the first official Grand National in 1839, and took shelter in the brook to avoid injury. The jump originally consisted of an 8 ft (2.4 m)-wide brook with a fence set back a yard (0.91 m) in front of the water, the ground on the landing side 3 ft (0.91 m) lower than the take-off side.

== Modifications ==
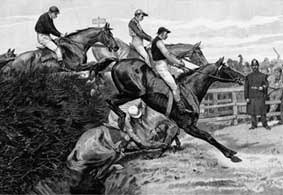
1890 engraving of horses jumping the Becher's Brook fence.

Slight amendments were made to the landing side of Becher's Brook in 1954 after recommendations were made to the National Hunt Committee, but the most significant modifications took place following the 1987 and 1989 Grand Nationals.

In 1987, Dark Ivy, a grey horse, fell at the fence and landed perpendicular, incurring a cervical fracture which killed him instantly. In 1989, six horses fell at Becher's on the first circuit. Seeandem, ridden by Liam Cusack, broke his back and had to be euthanised, while Brown Trix, ridden by amateur jockey David Pitcher, fractured a shoulder and then rolled down into the water-filled brook where he almost drowned. He was later euthanised. By the time the remaining runners reached Becher's Brook on the second circuit, course officials had been unable to remove the bodies in time. Audiences were given a clear view of Brown Trix's body at one end of the fence and a green tarpaulin covering Seeandem's body at the other end of the fence. Following an outcry, Aintree made several changes to the fence:

- The sharply sloped ground leading into the brook on the landing side was levelled off significantly.
- The brook itself was raised by 30 inches (76 cm) to include only 1 inch (2.5 cm) of water.
- Outside running rails were splayed out to allow more room for horses landing wide.

After an eight-horse pile up on the first circuit of the 2004 Grand National where some horses rolled back towards the mostly filled-in brook, the brook was completely rebuilt in 2005. It was built deeper and included running water for the first time since 1989 but was covered over with rubber matting in an effort to make the jump less hazardous for horses that had fallen.

In 2009, the Grand National course was widened so there is enough room for runners to bypass fences if required, including Becher's Brook. The new bypass lane at Becher's was used for the first time during the 2011 Grand National as marshals waved flags and diverted the remaining contenders around the fence on the second circuit while veterinary staff attended to a fatally injured horse, Dooneys Gate, who had broken his back.

On 15 August 2011, Aintree announced new modifications to Becher's Brook following a review of the course in the aftermath of the 2011 National. Amongst the changes to the course, the landing side of Becher's was re-profiled to reduce the current drop by between 4 and 5 inches (10 and 13 cm) across the width of the fence. The drop is now approximately 10 inches (25 cm) on the inside of the course and 6 inches (15 cm) on the outside of the course. This difference in drop from the inside to the outside of the fence has been retained to encourage riders to spread out across the width of the fence and also to retain the unique characteristics of the fence. The height of the fence remains unaltered at 4 feet 10 inches (1.47 m).

== Number of fallers ==
The following table shows the number of fallers at Becher's Brook during the main Grand National race (excluding the other races held on the course during the three-day meeting), including those who unseated their riders or were brought down, but not including those that pulled up, were carried out, or refused at the fence. The 2020 running was cancelled due to the COVID-19 pandemic.

Year	Falls	Equine fatalities
1960	6	
1961	3	
1962	0	
1963	1	
1964	1	
1965	6	
1966	6	
1967	1	
1968	4	
1969	3	
1970	2	
1971	5	
1972	6	
1973	2	
1974	0	
1975	4	1
1976	7	
1977	7	1
1978	4	
1979	5	1
1980	5	
1981	2	
1982	6	
1983	5	
1984	5	
1985	4	
1986	1	
1987	2	1
1988	4	
1989	6	2
1990	2	
1991	1	
1992	3	
1993 (void)	0	
1994	3	
1995	0	
1996	0	
1997	2	
1998	2	
1999	7	1
2000	3	
2001	3	
2002	2	
2003	3	
2004	9	
2005	2	
2006	2	
2007	5	
2008	2	
2009	3	
2010	2	
2011*	4	1
2012	3	1
2013	0	
2014	2	
2015	1	
2016	2	
2017	3	
2018*	3	
2019	0	
2021	0	
2022	0	
2023	0	
2024	0	
2025	0	
2026	1	

*Jumped only on first circuit.

== See also ==
- List of equine fatalities in the Grand National
- Canal Turn
- Foinavon
- The Chair
- National Velvet
