= Rhyme 'n' Reason =

British racehorse

- Foaled: 1979
- Owner: Juliet Reed
- Trainer: David Murray Smith; David Elsworth

Major wins
- Mumm Novices' Chase (1985); Irish Grand National (1985); Racing Post Chase (1988); Grand National (1988)

Rhyme 'n' Reason was a racehorse who won the Grand National in 1988. Ridden by Brendan Powell and starting at odds of 10/1, he finished the race four lengths clear of Durham Edition. It was his only run in the Grand National as he suffered a fractured hock when jumping Becher's Brook. He had an operation the following day and never raced again.

== Grand National record ==
| Grand National | Position | Jockey | Age | Weight | SP | Distance |
|---|---|---|---|---|---|---|
| 1988 | 1st | Brendan Powell | 9 | 11-00 | 10/1 | Won by 4 lengths |
