= Canal Turn =

Fence jumped during the Grand National

The Canal Turn is a fence on Aintree Racecourse's National Course and thus is jumped during the Grand National steeplechase which is held annually at the racecourse, located near Liverpool, England. Named for the Leeds & Liverpool Canal which passes alongside the racecourse at this point, it is jumped twice during the race, as the 8th and 24th fences.

The fence is notable for the sharp left turn that the runners have to take as soon as they have negotiated the fence. The turn is almost 90 degrees and it is not uncommon for jockeys to become unbalanced as they change course; unseatings and falls are common. Seven equine fatalities have been recorded at the Canal Turn in Grand Nationals since the race was first run officially in 1839; the most recent death was that of The Last Fling in 2002.

The Canal Turn has been the scene of a number of incidents that have had a major impact upon the outcome of the Grand National. In 1928, the favourite and top-weight Easter Hero refused at the ditch which at the time preceded the fence (this was filled in following the race). This refusal took out 20 horses. By the end of the first circuit only six horses remained in the field. By the final fence just two remained. Billy Barton fell at the last, leaving the 100/1 outsider Tipperary Tim to finish alone. Billy Barton was, however, remounted to pick up the second-place prize money.

In the 2001 Grand National the riderless Paddy's Return ran in front of the field as they approached the fence. This caused a number of horses to be stopped in their tracks or brought down. In total nine horses in the field were taken out of the race at the Canal Turn, including Amberleigh House, who went on to win the National in 2004. On the final circuit Paddy's Return again ran across the fence, but this time Red Marauder, the eventual winner, and Smarty, who eventually took second, avoided the loose horse.

In the 2015 Grand National the fence bypassed for the first time on the final circuit as vets treated Balthazar King, who was injured in a fall the first time round.

Two Cheltenham Gold Cup winners have departed at this fence in more recent years, The Fellow, (1994 Gold Cup winner) took a heavy fall on the second circuit the same year as his Cheltenham success, and Lord Windermere, (2014 Gold Cup winner) unseated his rider on the first circuit in 2018.

== Number of fallers ==
This table documents the number of runners which fell in recent Grand Nationals at the Canal Turn, including those who unseated riders or were brought down, but not those who were pulled up, carried out or refused at the fence. The 2020 running was cancelled due to the COVID-19 pandemic.

Year	Falls	Equine fatalities
2026	0	0
2025	0	0
2024	0	0
2023	2	0
2022	4	0
2021	0	0
2019	0	0
2018	3	0
2017	0	0
2016	1	0
2015*	2	0
2014	3	0
2013	3	0
2012	5	0
2011	1	0
2010	1	0
2009	0	0
2008	2	0
2007	3	0
2006	1	0
2005	0	0
2004	0	0
2003	1	0
2002	1	1
2001	6	0
2000	1	0
1999	0	0
1998	1	0
1997	0	0
1996	2	0
1995	0	0
1994	2	0
1993†	1	0
1992	1	0
1991	0	0
1990	1	1
1989	0	0
1988	2	0

* Fence was only jumped once, on first circuit.
† 1993 race void.
