= Seagram (horse) =

New Zealand-bred Thoroughbred racehorse

- Sire: Balak
- Grandsire: Busted
- Dam: Llanah
- Damsire: Bally Royal
- Sex: Gelding
- Foaled: c. 1980
- Country: New Zealand
- Colour: Chestnut
- Owner: Sir Eric Parker
- Trainer: David Barons

Major wins
- Grand National (1991)
- Last updated on 12 April 2015

Seagram (c.1980–1997) was a New Zealand bred Thoroughbred racehorse, famous for his victory in the 1991 Grand National sponsored by his namesake Seagram. This was his only notable victory. He came close to winning the Whitbread Gold Cup and was pulled up at the 27th fence in the 1992 Grand National. He lived in retirement until his death at the age of 17.

== Grand National record ==
Grand National	Position	Jockey	Age	Weight	SP	Distance
1991	1st	Nigel Hawke	11	10-6	12/1	Won by 5 lengths
1992	DNF	Nigel Hawke	12	11-4	33/1	Pulled up at fence 28

== Pedigree ==
Pedigree of Seagram (NZ), chestnut gelding, 1980
Sire Balak 1971	Busted (GB); 1963	Crepello (GB)	Donatello
Sire Balak 1971	Busted (GB); 1963	Crepello (GB)	Crepuscule
Sire Balak 1971	Busted (GB); 1963	Sans Le Sou (IRE)	Vimy
Sire Balak 1971	Busted (GB); 1963	Sans Le Sou (IRE)	Martial Loan
Sire Balak 1971	Schonbrunn (GER); 1957	Blue Peter (GB)	Fairway
Sire Balak 1971	Schonbrunn (GER); 1957	Blue Peter (GB)	Fancy Free
Sire Balak 1971	Schonbrunn (GER); 1957	Marie Theresa (GB)	Mieuxce
Sire Balak 1971	Schonbrunn (GER); 1957	Marie Theresa (GB)	Mary Tavy
Dam Llanah 1973	Bally Royal (GB); 1960	Ballymoss (GB)	Mossborough
Dam Llanah 1973	Bally Royal (GB); 1960	Ballymoss (GB)	Indian Call
Dam Llanah 1973	Bally Royal (GB); 1960	Code Militaire (GB)	Mieuxce
Dam Llanah 1973	Bally Royal (GB); 1960	Code Militaire (GB)	Battle Law
Dam Llanah 1973	Llanis Castle; 1956	Llanstephan (GB)	Dante
Dam Llanah 1973	Llanis Castle; 1956	Llanstephan (GB)	Gadabout
Dam Llanah 1973	Llanis Castle; 1956	Castle Moat	Milling
Dam Llanah 1973	Llanis Castle; 1956	Castle Moat	Arena
