= 1988 Grand National =

English steeplechase horse race

- Grand National
- Location: Aintree Racecourse
- Date: 9 April 1988
- Winning horse: (Northern Ireland) Rhyme 'n' Reason
- Starting price: 10/1
- Jockey: (Republic of Ireland) Brendan Powell
- Trainer: (England) David Elsworth
- Owner: Juliet Reed
- Conditions: Good to soft

External videos
- Replay of the 1988 Grand National in full YouTube

The 1988 Grand National (officially known as the Seagram Grand National for sponsorship reasons) was the 142nd renewal of the Grand National horse race that took place at Aintree Racecourse near Liverpool, England, on 9 April 1988.

The race was won by Rhyme 'n' Reason, in a time of nine minutes and 53.5 seconds and by a distance of four lengths. Durham Edition was second, and Monamore third. West Tip finished fourth. 17/2 favourite Sacred Path fell at the first fence. Nine of the 40 runners completed the course. One horse, Smith's Man, broke down during the race and died a few days later.

== Leading contenders ==
Sacred Path had been off the racecourse for fourteen months prior to a win at Warwick in March, which led him to be backed down to 17/2 favourite at the off despite the relative inexperience of his jockey, Clive Cox. The conditional jockey was one of eleven riders making their debut in the race but also proved to be one of the three who departed the race at the first fence. Neither horse nor rider competed in the race again.

Rhyme 'n Reason was a former Irish Grand National winner who had gone through a two-season barren spell before emerging as the form horse going into the Grand National. Wins in the Anthony Mildmay, Peter Cazalet Memorial Chase at Sandown and the Racing Post Chase in January were followed by an appearance in the Cheltenham Gold Cup where he was still in contention but under pressure when falling four fences from home. Few of his potential backers were put off by that and he was sent off at 10/1 with Brendan Powell in the saddle. Their race looked certain to come to an end when the horse all but fell at Becher's Brook and was left in last place by the time horse and rider had recovered to continue. Powell settled his mount back into the field and moved forward to challenge going to Becher's second time round, emerging from the fence in second place after Strands Of Gold fell and Course Hunter suffered an identical fate to Rhyme 'n Reason on the first circuit. They were left in front by the fall of Little Polveir five fences from home and remained there until being passed by Durham Edition at the penultimate fence, at which stage they looked beaten. Rhyme 'N Reason rallied after the final fence and overhauled the leader to win. The 1988 National was his first, and was also to be his last, picking up a fractured hock while jumping Becher's Brook on the first circuit. The gelding was retired from racing after his victory and spent the remainder of his life at Woodhaven stud in Hampshire.

Lean Ar Aghaidh and jockey, Guy Landau were also well backed at 10/1 after finishing third in the previous year's National despite having only made one appearance on a racecourse in the year since, when finishing second to Rhyme 'N Reason in the Racing Post Chase. In addition the horse was being asked to carry a full stone more than the previous year. Landau made a bid to win from the front and led the field through the first circuit. Early on the second circuit it became clear that the pace was telling as Lean Ar Aghaidh began to drop back through the field. They were still in touch at the Canal Turn but rapidly lost ground from that point forward before being the last of eight competitors to finish.

West Tip was by now an old favourite with the public, having won the race in 1986 and finishing fourth in 1987 and was partnered, as for his three previous appearances, by Richard Dunwoody. Staying out of trouble on the first circuit, Dunwoody moved the 11/1 shot into contention at Becher's Brook on the second circuit and was left in second place by the fall of Little Polvier five fences from home. West Tip was among the leading quartet at the Anchor Bridge crossing but rapidly came under pressure and was beaten by the penultimate fence, holding off a late challenge from Attitude Adjuster to retain fourth place to the finish. The old favourite would return again for a fifth attempt the following year.

You're Welcome and Hard Case also attracted a great deal of public support but their odds of 13/1 proved unlucky for both. Peter Hobbs broke a stirrup leather at the fourth fence on the former and almost carried out Course Hunter before finally regaining enough control to pull You're Welcome up before Becher's first time. Hard Case fared little better and made no impression before falling at the nineteenth fence when well to the rear.

== Finishing order ==
| Position | Name | Jockey | Age | Weight | SP | Distance |
|---|---|---|---|---|---|---|
| 1st | Rhyme 'n' Reason | Brendan Powell | 9 | 11-00 | 10/1 | Won by 4 lengths |
| 2nd | Durham Edition | Chris Grant | 10 | 10-09 | 20/1 | 15 lengths |
| 3rd | Monanore | Tom Taaffe | 11 | 10-04 | 33/1 | 8 lengths |
| 4th | West Tip | Richard Dunwoody | 11 | 11-07 | 11/1 | 2½ lengths |
| 5th | Attitude Adjuster | Niall Madden | 8 | 10-0 | 33/1 | 20 lengths |
| 6th | Friendly Henry | Neale Doughty | 8 | 10-04 | 100/1 | |
| 7th | The Tsarevich | John White | 12 | 10-10 | 18/1 | |
| 8th | Course Hunter | Paul Croucher | 10 | 10-01 | 20/1 | |
| 9th | Lean Ar Aghaidh | Guy Landau | 11 | 11-00 | 10/1 | Last to complete |

== Non-finishers ==
| Fence | Name | Jockey | Age | Weight | SP | Fate |
|---|---|---|---|---|---|---|
| 1st | Sacred Path | Clive Cox | 8 | 10-00 | 17/2 F | Fell |
| 1st | Tullamarine | Michael Bowlby | 11 | 10-00 | 200/1 | Fell |
| 1st | Hettinger | Ms. Penny Ffitch-Heyes | 8 | 10-00 | 100/1 | Fell |
| 3rd (open ditch) | Smith's Man | Mark Perrett | 10 | 10-00 | 50/1 | Broke blood vessel, pulled up |
| 5th | You're Welcome | Peter Hobbs | 12 | 10-01 | 13/1 | Broken stirrup leather, pulled up |
| 6th (Becher's Brook) | Lucisis | Mr. John Queally | 9 | 10-06 | 40/1 | Brought down |
| 6th (Becher's Brook) | Marcolo | Ms. Venetia Williams | 11 | 10-00 | 200/1 | Fell |
| 8th (Canal Turn) | Polly's Pal | Jayo Kinane | 10 | 10-00 | 100/1 | Brought down |
| 17th | Smartside | Mr. Al Hambly | 13 | 10-04 | 100/1 | Fell |
| 17th | Oyde Hills | Martin Brennan | 9 | 10-00 | 100/1 | Refused |
| 18th | Repington | Colin Hawkins | 10 | 10-01 | 16/1 | Refused |
| 19th (open ditch) | Hard Case | Kevin Morgan | 10 | 10-12 | 13/1 | Fell |
| 19th (open ditch) | Northern Bay | Hywel Davies | 12 | 10-04 | 50/1 | Pulled up |
| 20th | Insure | Ben De Haan | 10 | 10-00 | 80/1 | Unseated rider |
| 20th | Midnight Madness | Mark Richards | 10 | 10-05 | 25/1 | Pulled up |
| 21st | Preben Fur | Seamus O'Neill | 11 | 10-00 | 100/1 | Pulled up |
| 21st | Tracys Special | Steve Knight | 11 | 10-00 | 33/1 | Pulled up |
| 22nd (Becher's Brook) | Kumbi | Carl Llewellyn | 13 | 10-00 | 100/1 | Fell |
| 22nd (Becher's Brook) | Strands of Gold | Peter Scudamore | 9 | 10-03 | 20/1 | Fell |
| 22nd (Becher's Brook) | Bright Dream | Richard Rowe | 12 | 10-02 | 66/1 | Brought down |
| 26th | Little Polveir | Tom Morgan | 11 | 10-07 | 33/1 | Unseated rider |
| 26th | Eton Rouge | Dermot Browne | 9 | 10-05 | 80/1 | Pulled up |
| 26th | Gee-A | Gee Armytage | 9 | 10-03 | 33/1 | Pulled up |
| 27th (open ditch) | Brass Change | Martin Kinane | 10 | 10-00 | 100/1 | Fell |
| 27th (open ditch) | Lastofthebrownies | Tommy Carmody | 8 | 10-00 | 25/1 | Fell |
| 27th (open ditch) | Memberson | Ronnie Beggan | 10 | 10-03 | 33/1 | Pulled up |
| 27th (open ditch) | Big Brown Bear | Robert Stronge | 11 | 10-02 | 66/1 | Refused |
| 27th (open ditch) | Sir Jest | Kenny Jones | 10 | 10-02 | 22/1 | Refused |
| 27th (open ditch) | Seeandem | Pat Leech | 8 | 10-00 | 100/1 | Refused |
| 27th (open ditch) | Bucko | Mark Dwyer | 11 | 10-05 | 16/1 | Pulled up |
| 30th | Border Burg | Simon Sherwood | 11 | 10-07 | 16/1 | Pulled up |

== Media coverage and aftermath ==
Racing towards the elbow now, and Durham Edition, ridden by Chris Grant for Arthur Stephenson, is clear of Rhyme 'n' Reason, but Rhyme 'n' Reason is challenging again! Rhyme 'n' Reason is reducing his lead! Rhyme 'n' Reason is cutting it down as they race into the final hundred yards! Over on the far side is Durham Edition and on the near side is Rhyme 'n' Reason! Rhyme 'n' Reason is beginning to get up! He's going to win it! As they come to the line, Rhyme 'n' Reason has won the National!

— Commentator Peter O'Sullevan describes the climax of the race

The BBC broadcast the race live on television for the twenty-ninth consecutive year as part of its regular Saturday afternoon Grandstand programme, in a Grand National special. Commentary on the race itself, for the seventeenth consecutive year was provided by John Hanmer, Julian Wilson and lead commentator, Peter O'Sullevan who was calling his forty-third Grand National on Television and prior to that, Radio. BBC Radio Two's regular Saturday sport on two programme also broadcast live from Aintree and broadcast the race as it had done every year since 1927. All of the leading United Kingdom daily newspapers carried multi-page Grand National special pull outs and colour guides.

There were no recorded serious injuries among riders but Smith's Man broke down very badly and was put down a few days later.

Post race celebrations included a gala dinner and auction for 350 invited guests at the Adelphi Hotel.
