= Michael Connell (judge) =

British judge

Sir Michael Connell

Justice of the High Court
- In office 1991–2002

Personal details
- Born: Michael Bryan Connell
- Education: Harrow School; Brasenose College, Oxford

Sir Michael Bryan Connell (6 August 1939 – 30 January 2013) was a British barrister and High Court judge who sat in the Family Division from 1991 to 2002. A family law specialist, he was also noted for his involvement in horse racing.

== Biography ==
The son of Lorraine "Larry" Connell, founder of the eponymous estate agency, and of Joan Connell, Michael Connell was educated at Harrow School and Brasenose College, Oxford. He was called to the bar by the Inner Temple in 1962 and joined chambers at Queen Elizabeth Buildings, where he eventually came to specialise in family law. He became a QC in 1981.

After serving as a recorder from 1980 to 1991, Connell was appointed to the High Court in 1991 and received the customary knighthood. He was assigned to the Family Division, serving until his retirement in 2002 for health reasons.

Connell was involved with horse racing throughout his life. A jockey in his youth, he was a member of the Jockey Club and served on several of its committees. He led the investigation into the cancelled 1993 Grand National. He was also a fox hunter, and served as Master of the Grafton Hunt from 1973 until 1995.
