= Party Politics (horse) =

British-bred Thoroughbred racehorse

- Sire: Politico
- Grandsire: Right Royal
- Dam: Spin Again
- Damsire: Royalty
- Sex: Gelding
- Foaled: 1984
- Country: Great Britain
- Colour: Brown
- Breeder: David Stoddart
- Owner: David Stoddart; Patricia Thompson
- Trainer: Nick Gaselee

Major wins
- Grand National (1992); Greenalls Gold Cup (1993); Rehearsal Chase (1993)
- Last updated on August 23, 2007

Party Politics (1984–2009) was a Thoroughbred racehorse which won the 1992 Grand National at Aintree Racecourse, ridden by Carl Llewellyn, trained by Nick Gaselee and owned by Patricia Thompson. He also finished second to Royal Athlete in the 1995 Grand National. He was retired after falling at the first open ditch (fence 3) in the 1996 Grand National. He was put down in 2009, aged 25 due to old age.

== Grand National record ==
Grand National	Position	Jockey	Age	Weight	SP	Distance
1992	1st	Carl Llewellyn	8	10-7	14/1	Won by 2½ lengths
1993	DNF	Carl Llewellyn	9	11-2	7/1 F	Pulled up at fence 17 in void race
1995	2nd	Mark Dwyer	11	10-2	16/1	6 lengths
1996	DNF	Carl Llewellyn	12	10–11	10/1	Fell at fence 3

== Pedigree ==
Pedigree of Party Politics (GB) brown 1984
Sire Politico (USA) B. 1967	Right Royal (FR); B. 1958	Owen Tudor (GB)	Hyperion (GB)
Sire Politico (USA) B. 1967	Right Royal (FR); B. 1958	Owen Tudor (GB)	Mary Tudor (FR)
Sire Politico (USA) B. 1967	Right Royal (FR); B. 1958	Bastia (FR)	Victrix (FR)
Sire Politico (USA) B. 1967	Right Royal (FR); B. 1958	Bastia (FR)	Barberybush
Sire Politico (USA) B. 1967	Tendentious; B. 1959	Tenerani (ITY)	Bellini (ITY)
Sire Politico (USA) B. 1967	Tendentious; B. 1959	Tenerani (ITY)	Tofanella (GB)
Sire Politico (USA) B. 1967	Tendentious; B. 1959	Ambiguity (GB)	Big Game (GB)
Sire Politico (USA) B. 1967	Tendentious; B. 1959	Ambiguity (GB)	Amber Flash (GB)
Dam Spin Again (GB) B. 1975	Royalty (GB); B. 1968	Relko (GB)	Tanerko (FR)
Dam Spin Again (GB) B. 1975	Royalty (GB); B. 1968	Relko (GB)	Relance
Dam Spin Again (GB) B. 1975	Royalty (GB); B. 1968	Fair Bid (UK)	My Babu
Dam Spin Again (GB) B. 1975	Royalty (GB); B. 1968	Fair Bid (UK)	Market Fair (GB)
Dam Spin Again (GB) B. 1975	Spin A Yarn; B. 1967	Doubtless (ARG)	Cute Eyes (ARG)
Dam Spin Again (GB) B. 1975	Spin A Yarn; B. 1967	Doubtless (ARG)	Sospecha (ARG)
Dam Spin Again (GB) B. 1975	Spin A Yarn; B. 1967	Spinning Coin (GB)	Kingsway (GB)
Dam Spin Again (GB) B. 1975	Spin A Yarn; B. 1967	Spinning Coin (GB)	Oh Fie (GB)
