= Little Polveir =

British-bred Thoroughbred racehorse

- Sire: Cantab
- Grandsire: Cantaber
- Dam: Blue Speedwell
- Damsire: Escart
- Sex: Gelding
- Foaled: 1977
- Country: United Kingdom
- Colour: Bay
- Owner: Mike Shone –1989, Edward Harvey 1989–1999
- Trainer: Toby Balding 1989–1999

Major wins
- Scottish Grand National (1987); Grand National (1989)
- Last updated on August 23, 2007

Little Polveir (1977–1999) was a race horse. He won the 1989 Grand National steeplechase ridden by Jimmy Frost, beating West Tip by seven lengths. The horse had previously finished ninth in 1986 and did not finish in 1987 and 1988 (where he fell at one after Valentine's Brook) while owned by Mike Shone, after which he was sold as a 12-year-old for 15,000gns in February 1989.

The track "Little Polveir" by the Sheffield-based band Monkey Swallows the Universe is named after the horse. After the track was written, the band signed to Loose Records, which coincidentally is owned by Tom Bridgewater, the son-in-law of Toby Balding, Little Polveir's trainer. Little Polveir died in 1999.

== Grand National record ==
Grand National	Position	Jockey	Age	Weight	SP	Distance
1986	9th	Colin Brown	9	10-3	36/1	
1987	DNF	Colin Brown	10	10-2	33/1	Unseated rider at fence 15
1988	DNF	Tom Morgan	11	10-7	33/1	Unseated rider at fence 26
1989	1st	Jimmy Frost	12	10-3	28/1	Won by 7 lengths
