= 1992 Grand National =

Horse race held in 1992

- Grand National
- Location: Aintree Racecourse
- Date: 4 April 1992
- Winning horse: Party Politics
- Starting price: 14/1
- Jockey: (Wales) Carl Llewellyn
- Trainer: Nick Gaselee
- Owner: Patricia Thompson
- Conditions: Good to soft

External videos
- 1992 Grand National in full Racing UK, BBC Sport, YouTube
- Replay of the latter stages of the 1992 Grand National BBC Sport

The 1992 Grand National (officially known as the Martell Grand National for sponsorship reasons) was the 146th renewal of the world-famous Grand National horse race that took place at Aintree Racecourse near Liverpool, England, on 4 April 1992.

It was won in a time of nine minutes and 6.4 seconds and by a distance of 2 1/2 lengths by 14/1 shot Party Politics, ridden by Welsh jockey Carl Llewellyn. The winner was trained by Nick Gaselee of Hungerford, Berkshire, and carried the colors of owner Patricia Thompson, pink with purple crossbelts, hooped sleeves, and a purple cap. The winning owner collected £99,943 of a total prize fund shared through the first five finishers of £167,386. For safety reasons, the field was restricted to 40 runners. All of the horses returned safely to the stables.

The winner proved a very popular horse with a topical name; many of the once-a-year punters backed him because the race fell just five days before the 1992 United Kingdom general election.

== Leading contenders ==
Docklands Express was sent off as the 15/2 favorite despite having been a first fence faller in the previous year's National. In the year since he had put together several good performances in the major chases, winning the Racing Post Chase at Kempton in February and then finishing third in the Cheltenham Gold Cup the following month. With regular rider Anthony Tory unavailable, champion jockey Peter Scudamore took the ride and gave their backers every chance jumping the Canal Turn on the second circuit among an unusually large number of runners still holding a chance of victory. Scudamore moved his mount through the field on the run back to the racecourse, turning for home a close-up third but was unable to quicken into the second-last fence and was beaten by the final flight, fading to finish over 25 lengths down in fourth.

Brown Windsor was backed down to 8/1 in partnership with 1986 winning rider Richard Dunwoody despite the horse having been off the course for more than a year after finishing fourth in the 1990 race. The horse returned to the course early in 1992 in three preps for the National, winning the third and was among the leaders when falling at Becher's Brook on the first circuit. Owner Michael Buckley later said: "The form says he fell, but that's unfair to Brown Windsor. Richard Dunwoody was unseated. Albeit by a loose horse crashing into him mid-air."

Twin Oaks was allocated top weight of 11 stone 7 lbs and had won two of his three prep races since pulling up in the Welsh Grand National in December, one of those being the Peter Marsh chase at Haydock in February and was sent off at 9/1 in company with regular jockey, Neale Doughty, himself the winner of the race in 1984. Doughty rode a patient waiting race towards the rear of the main pack before moving through the field three fences from home. They jumped into a distant fourth briefly at the second last flight but could make no impression from that point and finished twenty-seven and a half lengths distant in fifth. This proved to be Twin Oaks' only attempt at the National and went on to win the Tommy Whittle Chase in December before being retired after a poor run in a Greenalls Gold Cup in February 1993.

Cool Ground was bidding to become only the second horse ever to win the Cheltenham Gold Cup and Grand National in the same season. In the absence of regular rider, Adrian Maguire, Martin Lynch took the ride and was in contention in the first dozen at The Canal Turn but was under pressure after jumping the third last flight and never got closer than his eventual tenth-place finish.

Auntie Dot proved popular with the public after her third in the previous year's National and four victories in the year since enhanced her credentials when sent off as a 12/1 shot with Mark Dwyer in the saddle. The mare was at the rear of the main pack at the Canal Turn second time around but was unable to get on terms and finished a distant sixteenth in what proved to be her final race.

Laura's Beau attracted attention after winning the four-mile National handicap chase at Uttoxeter three weeks before the National and was sent off at 12/1 with Conor O'Dwyer in the saddle. Having spent the majority of the race well to the rear, Laura's Beau came through the field after the Canal Turn to take the last fence in fourth place, albeit a long way behind. He overhauled Docklands Express on the run-in to take third place.

Both the eventual winner and second, Romany King were also well supported at 14/1 and 16/1 respectively while the grey, Stay on Tracks and the 1990 Midlands Grand National winner, Wilsford were both also 16/1.

== Finishing order ==
Position	Name	Jockey	Age	Weight	SP	Distance
1st	Party Politics	Carl Llewellyn	8	10-07	14/1	Won by 2 1/2 lengths
2nd	Romany King	Richard Guest	8	10-03	16/1	15 lengths
3rd	Laura's Beau	Conor O'Dwyer	8	10-00	12/1	8 lengths
4th	Docklands Express	Peter Scudamore	10	11-02	15/2 F	2 lengths
5th	Twin Oaks	Neale Doughty	12	11-07	9/1	A head
6th	Just So	Simon Burrough	9	10-02	50/1	4 lengths
7th	Old Applejack	Andy Orkney	12	10-00	35/1	2 1/2 lengths
8th	Over the Road	Robbie Supple	11	10-00	22/1	4 lengths
9th	Stay on Tracks	Chris Grant	10	10-00	16/1	2 lengths
10th	Cool Ground	Martin Lynch	10	11-01	10/1	3 1/2 lengths
11th	Ghofar	Hywel Davies	9	10-03	25/1	2 1/2 lengths
12th	Forest Ranger	Dai Tegg	10	10-00	200/1	A neck
13th	What's the Crack	Jamie Osborne	9	10-00	20/1	10 lengths
14th	Rubika (FRA)	Peter Niven	9	10-02	28/1	7 lengths
15th	Golden Minstrel	Eamon Murphy	13	10-00	150/1	2 lengths
16th	Auntie Dot	Mark Dwyer	11	10-07	12/1	1 length
17th	Roc de Prince (FRA)	Charlie Swan	9	10-09	40/1	3/4 length
18th	Mighty Falcon	Paul Holley	7	10-00	80/1	3/4 length
19th	Radical Lady	Jason Callaghan	8	10-00	80/1	3 1/2 lengths
20th	Willsford	Michael Bowlby	9	10-00	16/1	8 lengths
21st	Team Challenge	Ben de Haan	10	10-00	100/1	A distance
22nd	Sirrah Jay	Ronnie Beggan	12	10-00	100/1	Last to complete

== Non-finishers ==
Fence	Name	Jockey	Age	Weight	SP	Fate
1st	Rawhide	Kevin O'Brien	8	10-00	50/1	Unseated rider
6th (Becher's Brook)	Brown Windsor	Richard Dunwoody	10	10-08	8/1	Fell
7th (Foinavon's)	Omertà	Lorcan Wyer	12	10-04	33/1	Pulled up
8th (Canal Turn)	Honeybeer Mead	Nicky Mann	10	10-00	100/1	Unseated rider
9th (Valentine's)	Stearsby	Seamus Mackey	13	10-06	250/1	Refused
15th (The Chair)	Rowlandsons Jewels	Graham Bradley	11	10-03	60/1	Unseated rider
17th	Huntworth	Mark Richards	12	10-00	66/1	Pulled up
19th (open ditch)	Bonanza Boy	Steve Smith-Eccles	11	10-11	25/1	Unseated rider
19th (open ditch)	New Halen	Robert Bellamy	11	10-00	66/1	Refused
20th	Golden Fox	Simon Earle	10	10-00	200/1	Refused
22nd (Becher's Brook)	Mister Ed	Derek Morris	9	10-00	100/1	Fell
22nd (Becher's Brook)	Cloney Grange	Doc O'Connor	13	10-00	100/1	Fell
24th (Canal Turn)	Kittinger	Ian Lawrence	11	10-00	200/1	Refused
24th (Canal Turn)	Royal Battery (NZL)	Rodi Greene	9	10-00	80/1	Pulled up
25th	Why So Hasty	Billy Worthington	11	10-00	250/1	Pulled up
26th	Karakter Reference	Darren O'Sullivan	10	10-01	50/1	Pulled up
27th (open ditch)	Seagram (NZL)	Nigel Hawke	12	11-04	33/1	Pulled up
28th	Hotplate	Graham McCourt	9	10-05	50/1	Pulled up

== Media coverage and aftermath ==
It's Party Politics from Romany King. Laura's Beau coming to challenge Docklands Express for 3rd. Racing towards the line, Party Politics from Romany King. Laura's Beau has moved into 3rd and racing up to the line, Party Politics is going to win the 1992 Grand National!

— Commentator Peter O'Sullevan describes the climax of the race

The race and its build-up were broadcast live on BBC television for the thirty-third consecutive year as part of a Grandstand Grand National special hosted by Des Lynam. The commentary team for the twenty-second consecutive year was John Hanmer who covered the first four fences, Julian Wilson who covered the fence before Becher's Brook until Valentine's Brook before handing back to Hanmer who covered the field back onto the racecourse proper, before handing over to the anchor commentator, Peter O'Sullevan who covered the start, midway point and finish of the race. This was the last year that Wilson commentated for the BBC thus bringing an end to the longest unbroken commentary team line-up in the televised history of the race. The start time of 4.00pm was slightly later than usual as The Boat Race was also shown in Grandstand earlier in the afternoon.
