= David Barons =

British horse trainer

David Hawken Barons (6 December 1936 – 18 February 2018) was a British horse trainer who specialized in training horses competing in National Hunt racing.

Barons gained his most notable success when training Seagram to win the 1991 Grand National. In a career lasting more than 30 years he trained over 900 winners.
