= Peter Niven =

Scottish jockey (born 1964)

Peter Niven (b. 7 Aug 1964) is a retired British jump jockey in National Hunt racing. In May 2001 he became the first Scotsman and sixth jockey to ride over 1,000 winners, eventually retiring in September that year with 1002 winners. At the time of his retirement he was the only jockey to have won five races in a day on four occasions. He is now a racehorse trainer.

== Racing career ==
Niven won his first race at Sedgefield in 1984 on a horse called Loch Brandy. After struggling for a few years to make his way in the sport, he teamed up with Mary Reveley at her Saltburn stables in Clevelend soon forging a formidable partnership. He became a professional jockey in 1986. Some of the 'major' races he won include:

=== Notable wins ===
- International Hurdle 1987 (Pat's Jester)
- Great Yorkshire Chase 1991 (Dalkey Sound), 1994 (Carbisdale)
- Future Champion Novices' Chase 1993 (Cab On Target)
- Tingle Creek Chase 1993 (Sybillin)
- Fighting Fifth Hurdle 1994 (Batabanoo)
- RSA Chase 1994 (Monsieur Le Cure)
- Liverpool Hurdle 1995 (Cab on Target), 1998 (Marello)
- Maghull Novices' Chase 1996 (Ask Tom)
- Eider Chase 1995 (Willsford), 1997 (Seven Towers)
- Midlands Grand National 1997 (Seven Towers)

=== Grand National ===
He rode in the Grand National on six occasions:

- 1991 Grand National Hotplate (Pulled up 22nd)
- 1992 Grand National Rubika (Finished 14th)
- 1994 Grand National Mr Boston (Fell at the 13th)
- 1995 Grand National Superior Finish (Unseated rider at the 10th)
- 1997 Grand National Avro Anson (Finished 6th)
- 2000 Grand National Hollybank Buck (Finished 10th)

=== Awards ===
- Lester Award: Jump Jockey of the Year 1991
- Lester Award: Jump Jockey Special Recognition Award 2000
