= Royal Athlete =

British Thoroughbred racehorse (1983–2003)

- Sire: Roselier
- Grandsire: Misti
- Dam: Darjoy
- Damsire: Darantus
- Sex: Gelding
- Foaled: 1983
- Country: United Kingdom
- Colour: Chestnut
- Breeder: John Brophy
- Owner: Gary & Libby Johnson
- Trainer: Jenny Pitman
- Record: 32: 11-2-4
- Earnings: £222,260

Major wins
- Long Walk Hurdle (1989); Reynoldstown Novices' Chase (1990); Mumm Club Chase (1990); Grand National (1995)

Royal Athlete (1983–2003) was a British-bred racehorse whose most famous victory was the 1995 Grand National at Aintree, ridden by 24-year-old Irishman Jason Titley at odds of 40/1. He had previously won several important races including the Long Walk Hurdle, Reynoldstown Novices' Chase, Mumm Club Chase as well as finishing third to Jodami in the Cheltenham Gold Cup.

The horse had been among the favourites for the 1993 Grand National but fell in the race, which was later declared void due to an unrecalled false start. In 1995 his trainer Jenny Pitman tried to talk the owners, Gary and Libby Johnson out of running him at Aintree, confessing to the BBC's Des Lynam in a post race interview that she thought they were "Mad bringing him here 'cause he could win the Scottish National (scheduled to be run two weeks later) doing triple toeloops." As it was, Royal Athlete was pulled up in that race at Ayr and was retired shortly afterwards.

Royal Athlete returned to Aintree for the next seven years to take part in the parade of champions before his death in May 2003 at the age of 20.
