= Jenny Pitman =

British racehorse trainer

Jenny Pitman OBE
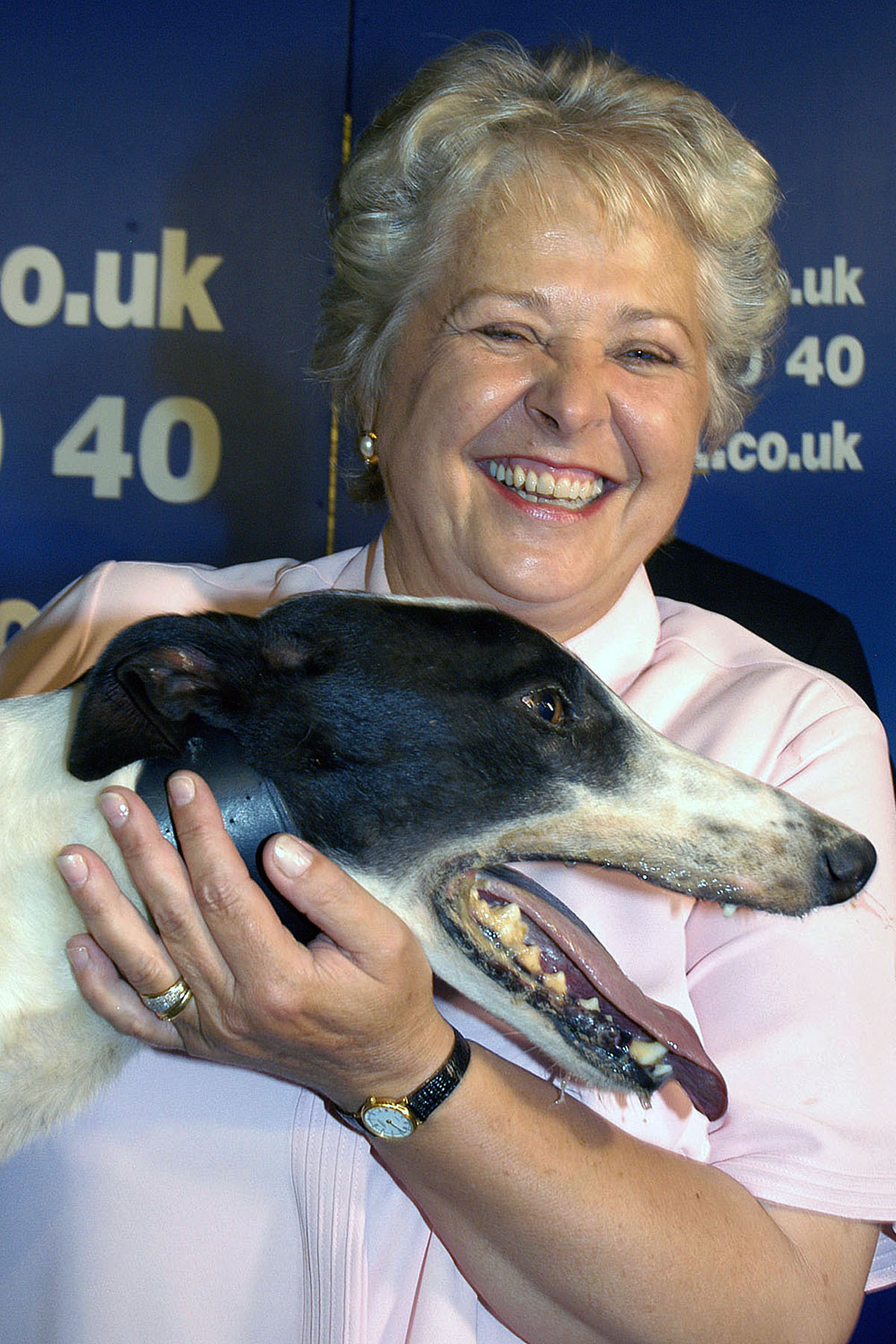

Personal information
- Nationality: British
- Born: 11 June 1946 (age 80) Hoby, Leicestershire, England
- Occupations: Horse trainer, novelist

Horse racing career
- Sport: Horse racing

Major racing wins
- Grand National (1983, 1995); Cheltenham Gold Cup (1984, 1991)

Honours
- OBE

Significant horses
- Corbiere, Royal Athlete, Esha Ness, Burrough Hill Lad, Garrison Savannah

Dame Jennifer Susan Pitman OBE (née Harvey, born 11 June 1946) is a British former racehorse trainer and author. She became the first woman to train a Grand National winner when Corbiere won the race in 1983, and she won a second Grand National with Royal Athlete in 1995. She has also trained two Cheltenham Gold Cup winners with Burrough Hill Lad in 1984 and Garrison Savanah in 1991. Following her retirement from horse training in 1998, she became a writer of novels, principally with a racing theme. She is a member of the Disciplinary Panel and Licensing Committee of the British Horseracing Authority.

== Childhood ==
Pitman grew up on her family's farm near Hoby, Leicestershire, the fourth of seven children. Her father, George, was a tenant farmer who "kept a few of everything". The farm had no electricity, gas supply or mains water. She was brought up assisting in manual farm work, where horse powered equipment was a novelty, and learned to ride a pony "so young that being on horseback seemed as natural as walking". In 1957 she left the Hoby village school to attend Sarson Secondary Modern Girls' School in Melton Mowbray. She sustained a fractured skull when a showjumping pole fell on her head during a gymkhana at Syston and it was many months before the resultant convulsions were diagnosed. At the age of 14, she obtained a weekend and school holiday job at Brooksby Grange horse racing yard.

Pitman left school two weeks before her 15th birthday, taking up a position as a stable girl at Brooksby Grange for a weekly wage of £3 4s 5d. Her first overnight stop was at Manchester where her filly, Star Princess, won the 1962 Diomedes Handicap. Two years later she changed employers, moving to a stable in Bishop's Cleeve, Gloucestershire, the first time she had lived away from her Leicestershire home.

== Career ==
Pitman worked at Bishop's Cleeve for two years. One day, she was returning from a workout on the local gallops when her horse was spooked by a cyclist travelling around a corner too fast and on the wrong side of the road; the cyclist was jockey Richard Pitman. Jenny's initial reaction to Pitman was unfavourable, but later, when Richard obtained a job in Lambourn, Berkshire at Fred Winter's training stables 50 miles (80 km) from Bishop's Cleeve, Jenny was persuaded to apply for a job in Lambourn with Major Champneys at Church Farm Stables. She moved there in 1964.

In the winter of 1967, missing the world of horses, she and Pitman (by then her husband) bought a 6-acre (2.4 ha) property with stables and an indoor school in Hinton Parva, Wiltshire, to provide a service to other trainers for recuperating injured horses. At 'Parva Stud', the family struggled to live in an unheated caravan. By the end of 1968, Pitman had eight horses at the yard. With Richard's second place prize from the 1969 Grand National, the Pitmans were able to commission a bungalow on the premises to escape the poor condition caravan. In 1969 she employed a 'lad' to assist at the yard, Melvyn Saddler, who became her right-hand man as her success grew.

In February 1974, Pitman entered a horse she had trained in her first point-to-point race. Ridden by stable lad Bryan Smart, Road Race did not figure in the race betting, but passed the favourite after the last fence to win. She obtained a horse training licence in her own name in 1975, and her first winner came in the same year. After her separation from Richard she bought the then dilapidated Wethercock Farm and continued training. Her and Richard had a brief reconciliation where he invested his share of the money from Parva Stud into renovating Wethercock Farm. They finally separated for good and Jenny bought out Richard's share.

In 1983 she became the first woman to train a Grand National winner, when Corbiere was the victor. She was to win one other Grand National with Royal Athlete in 1995, although her horse Esha Ness was first past the post in the void National of 1993.

In 1998 she was appointed OBE for services to horseracing. She retired from training racehorses in 1999, handing over the reins to her son, Mark. Later that year she was the first winner of the BBC Sports Personality of the Year Helen Rollason Award.

Although still seen at the races, she is now a prolific writer of novels, principally with a racing spin. In 2017 she became a member of the Disciplinary Panel and Licensing Committee of the British Horseracing Authority

== Personal life ==
Aged 19, she married Richard Pitman. In August 1966, their son Mark was born and Jenny became a full-time housewife. Son Paul was born in October 1967. In 1977 Jenny and Richard divorced. She is now married to businessman David Stait.

Pitman is a survivor of thyroid cancer and a patron of the British Thyroid Foundation.

== Books ==
- Pitman, Jenny; Gibson, Sue (1984). Glorious Uncertainty. Willow. ISBN 9780002181105. co-author Sue Gibson
- Pitman, Jenny (2002). On the Edge. Pan books. ISBN 978-0-330-49034-4.
- Double Deal. Pan Macmillan. 2002. ISBN 978-0-75052-1208.
- The Dilemma. Jan Hardy. Pan Books. 2004. ISBN 978-0-330-41296-4.
- The Vendetta. Pan Books. 2005. ISBN 978-0-330-41295-7.
- The Inheritance. Pan Books. 2006. ISBN 978-0-330-43424-9.
- Jenny Pitman: The Autobiography. Transworld. 2012. ISBN 978-1-4464-9793-7.
