= Garrison Savannah (horse) =

British-bred Thoroughbred racehorse

- Racing silks of Autofour Engineering
- Sire: Random Shot
- Grandsire: Pirate King
- Dam: Merry Coin
- Damsire: Current Coin
- Sex: Gelding
- Foaled: 1983
- Country: Ireland
- Colour: Bay
- Breeder: John McDowell
- Owner: Autofour Engineering
- Trainer: Jenny Pitman
- Record: 49: 9-9-9
- Earnings: £283,484

Major wins
- Sun Alliance Chase (1990); Cheltenham Gold Cup (1991)

Garrison Savannah (1983–2005) was a Thoroughbred racehorse.

He won the Cheltenham Gold Cup in 1991 by a short-head from The Fellow with Desert Orchid back in third place. In the same year, he came second in the Aintree Grand National. He won the previous year's Royal & SunAlliance Chase. He had only one race between his two Cheltenham Festival wins. In that race he came second to Celtic Shot in the Tommy Whittle Chase.

His Gold Cup win is rather unusual in that he beat two former champions in Desert Orchid (third) and Norton's Coin (fell) and two future champions in The Fellow (second) and Cool Ground (fourth). Also in the race were a former Champion Hurdle winner Celtic Shot (seventh) and a future Grand National winner Party Politics (pulled up).

He was trained by Jenny Pitman, in Lambourn, Berkshire, England and was ridden by her son Mark Pitman. The groom after he retired was Marie Thompson

His victory in the Gold Cup was accompanied by an upsurge in interest in acupuncture, as his trainer revealed that he had been treated with acupuncture and homeopathy for a stubborn lameness.<citation>

Garrison Savannah was put down after a paddock accident in August 2005.
