= Carl Llewellyn =

Welsh racehorse trainer

Personal information
- Born: 29 July 1965 (age 60) Pembrokeshire, Wales
- Occupations: Jockey (retired) and assistant racehorse trainer
- Height: 5 ft 6 in (1.68 m)

Horse racing career
- Sport: Horse racing

Major racing wins
- Grand National (1992, 1998); Welsh Grand National; Scottish Grand National; Whitbread Gold Cup; Aintree Hurdle; Sefton Novices' Hurdle; Long Walk Hurdle; Feltham Novices' Chase; Charlie Hall Chase; Mackeson Gold Cup Handicap Chase; Triumph Hurdle; Bristol Novices' Hurdle; Challow Novices' Hurdle; Rising Stars Novices' Chase

Significant horses
- Earth Summit; Party Politics; Barton Bank; Bindaree; Martha's Son; Beau; Run For Paddy.

Carl Llewellyn (born 29 July 1965) is an assistant racehorse trainer to Nigel Twiston-Davies and a retired Welsh professional National Hunt jockey. Llewellyn won the Grand National on two occasions along with the Welsh Grand National and Scottish Grand National as a jockey. He has also won the Whitbread / Bet365 Gold Cup both as a jockey and as a trainer and many grade races.

== Racing career ==
Llewellyn began his riding career with his father Eryl, a farmer, riding in point to points and moved on to ride under National Hunt rules, where he rode as an amateur with Stan Mellor and Jim Old. His first winner came on 14 March 1986 with Stargestic at Wolverhampton Racecourse, who was trained by Roy Robinson.

His first big race victory was the Mildmay of Flete Challenge Cup at the 1988 Cheltenham Festival meeting on Smart Tar trained by Mark (Jumbo) Wilkinson.

He broke his leg in two places at Market Rasen on Saturday 3 March 1990 on Suncia, after Cool Trade fell. He had multiple operations at Lincoln County Hospital.

On 12 March 1992 Llewellyn again had a winner at the Cheltenham Festival on Tipping Tim in the Ritz Club National Hunt Handicap Chase and later going on to win the 1992 Grand National on Party Politics and on 14 November 1992, during the Open Meeting, he won the Mackeson Gold Cup Handicap Chase again on Tipping Tim.

He was the main jockey for Nigel Twiston-Davies throughout his career. In 1997 he won the Grade 1 Christmas Hurdle on Kerawi at the King George VI Chase meeting at Kempton Park. Llewellyn rode Beau to success at the 2000 Whitbread Gold Cup held at Sandown Park. Llewellyn won the race by the biggest winning margin in the history of the race. In 2003 he rode Bindaree to win the Welsh Grand National. His last ride as jockey came on 29 April 2009 at Punchestown Racecourse where he came in 4th position on Roll Along in the Punchestown Gold Cup.

Grade 1 winners ridden by Carl Llwellyn
Year	Race	Horse
1992	Sefton Novices' Hurdle	Barton Bank †
1993	Liverpool Hurdle	Sweet Duke
1993	Long Walk Hurdle	Sweet Duke
1993	Tolworth Hurdle	Sun Surfer ‡
1993	Scilly Isles Novices' Chase	Young Hustler
1993	Baring Bingham Novices' Hurdle	Gaelstrom
1994	Supreme Novices' Hurdle	Arctic Kinsman
1996	Long Walk Hurdle	Ocean Hawk
1997	Christmas Hurdle	Kerawi
1997	Melling Chase	Martha's Son ‡
1998	Scilly Isles Novices' Chase	Jack Doyle
1998	Triumph Hurdle	Upgrade
1999	Challow Novices' Hurdle (2 Jan)	King's Road
1999	Challow Novices' Hurdle (31 Dec)	Bindaree
2000	Aintree Hurdle	Mister Morose
2004	Kauto Star Novices' Chase	Ollie Magern
2004	Baring Bingham Novices' Hurdle	Fundamentalist
All horses trained by Nigel Twiston-Davies except † David Nicholson and ‡ Tim Forster

== Training career ==
In August 2005 Llewellyn became assistant trainer and jockey to Mark Pitman, the son of Richard Pitman and Jenny Pitman, at Weathercock House, Lambourn. Llewellyn took over as the head trainer from Pitman after the 2006 Grand National in April of that year. Later that month he rode and trained Run For Paddy to win the Scottish Grand National.

Llewellyn trained 79 winners in three years at Weathercock House, but by June 2009, Llewellyn was sacked as trainer by the owner of Weathercock House, Malcolm Denmark. He has won the Whitbread / Bet365 Gold Cup as both a jockey and as a trainer. Llewellyn led out his last two horses for the stable on 27 Jun 2009 at Uttoxeter Racecourse, without any success. The following day he again joined Nigel Twiston-Davies as a business partner.

Grade 1 winner trained by Carl Llwellyn
Year	Race	Horse	Jockey
2007	Celebration Chase	Dempsey	Timmy Murphy

== Family and business life ==
Carl Llewellyn, whose nickname is Carlos, was born on 29 July 1965 in Pembrokeshire, Wales. His father is Eryl Llewellyn, a Pembrokeshire farmer. He has been a director of Carl Llewellyn Business and Leisure Limited since September 2000. Previously he was also a director of the Professional Jockeys' Association from November 1991 until June 2008.

== Controversy over racist remark ==
In April 2014, Llewellyn was fined £1,500 by the British Horseracing Authority (BHA) after admitting bringing the sport into disrepute for making a racist remark at the Hollow Bottom pub in Gloucestershire on 10 March. He told an audience of 140 racegoers that "There are no niggers in here because Hugh [Kelly, the owner] doesn’t allow them in". The BHA charged Llewellyn after the Gloucestershire Police questioned him under caution. They did not take any further action because no official complaint was lodged. Llewellyn said after the hearing "I am absolutely mortified that my comment caused offence, that was never my intention. I apologised immediately on the evening in question, and do so again now".

== See also ==
- List of jockeys
