= Peter Scudamore =

British champion jockey (born 1958)

Peter Scudamore MBE
Personal information
- Nationality: English
- Born: 13 June 1958 (age 68)
- Children: Michael Scudamore; Tom Scudamore

Horse racing career
- Sport: Horse racing

Major racing wins
- Swinton Handicap Hurdle (1984); Welsh Grand National (1985, 1988, 1989, 1991); Triumph Hurdle (1986); Ritz Club National Hunt Chase (1986); Queen Mother Champion Chase (1987); Champion Hurdle (1988, 1993); Hennessy Gold Cup (1988, 1991); Mackeson Gold Cup (1988); Sun Alliance Chase (1991, 1992, 1993); Imperial Cup (1989, 1993); Scottish Grand National (1987, 1992)

Racing awards
- Champion Jockey (1981–82, 1985–86, 1986–87, 1987–88, 1988–89, 1989–90, 1990–91, 1991–92)

Significant horses
- Bonanza Boy; Carvill's Hill; Celtic Shot; Strands Of Gold; Little Polveir; Miinnehoma

Peter Michael Scudamore MBE (born 29 June 1958), often known as 'Scu', is a trainer and former jockey in National Hunt racing. He was an eight-time Champion Jockey (including one title shared with John Francome), riding 1,678 winning horses in his career. He was appointed a Member of the Order of the British Empire (MBE) for services to National Hunt Racing in the 1990 Birthday Honours.

== Early life ==
Scudamore was born in June 1958 to jockey Michael Scudamore and his wife Mary. Michael Scudamore won the 1959 Grand National on Oxo, when his son was still a baby. Scudamore remembers little about his father's career, except for the fall that ended it. He has, however, spoken of his father's toughness as a jockey and of wanting to live up to him.

== Racing career ==
Scudamore's first competitive ride came in 1978, the start of a 15-year career which would see him break many jumps racing records. He benefited particularly from being a stable jockey for the record breaking trainer Martin Pipe and the partnership was an extremely successful one throughout the 1980s and early 1990s.

As well as setting the then all-time career record of 1,678 winners, he also set the record for most winners in a season (221) in 1988–89, surpassing Jonjo O'Neill's mark to become the first jockey to exceed 150 in one season. Although both records have since been surpassed, Scudamore's records were set before the advent of year-round National Hunt racing. In all, he was champion eight times.

He won 13 times at the Cheltenham Festival including two Champion Hurdles - Celtic Shot in 1988 and Granville Again in 1993 - and a Queen Mother Champion Chase on Pearlyman. Other major victories included the Hennessy Cognac Gold Cup (twice), Mackeson Gold Cup, four Welsh Nationals (including two on Bonanza Boy) and two Scottish Nationals. Horses with which he was associated during his racing career included Grand National winners Miinnehoma and Little Polveir although he himself won neither a National nor a Cheltenham Gold Cup nor a King George.

He retired on 7 April 1993 with a winning ride on Sweet Duke at Ascot, his 1,678th winner.

== Post-retirement ==
Immediately after retirement as a jockey, Scudamore became an assistant trainer to his business partner Nigel Twiston-Davies. He later moved to Scotland to live with, and become assistant trainer to, jumps trainer, Lucinda Russell at Arlary House Stables near Milnathort.

He has also pursued a career in media, featuring regularly as a pundit on BBC racing coverage and writing a racing column for the Daily Mail.

He is involved with his son Michael's yard in Herefordshire and his other son Tom Scudamore is a retired professional jockey.

Peter is second cousin to former Chief Executive of the F.A. Premier League, Richard Scudamore.
