= 2009 Grand National =

English steeplechase horse race

- Grand National
- Location: Aintree Racecourse
- Date: 4 April 2009
- Winning horse: (France) Mon Mome
- Starting price: 100/1
- Jockey: (England) Liam Treadwell
- Trainer: (England) Venetia Williams
- Owner: (England) Vida Bingham
- Conditions: Good

External videos
- Replay of the 2009 Grand National in full Racing TV, YouTube

The 2009 Grand National (officially known as the John Smith's Grand National for sponsorship reasons) was the 162nd running of the Grand National horse race that took place at Aintree Racecourse near Liverpool, England, on 4 April 2009.

A 100/1 outsider, the French-bred Mon Mome, ridden by Liam Treadwell, won the race by 12 lengths from the previous year's winner Comply or Die (14/1) in a time of 9 minutes 34 seconds. Mon Mome became the first 100/1 shot to win since Foinavon in 1967. He also became the first winner of the race to have been bred in France for 100 years.

Mon Mome was trained by Venetia Williams at her Herefordshire stables and was owned by Vida Bingham of East Sussex.

Seventeen runners completed the 4-mile 4 furlong course over Aintree's National circuit. Hear The Echo collapsed during the latter stages of the race and later died.

== Race card ==
Note: Trained in Great Britain unless otherwise stated in brackets.

- 1: Cloudy Lane

Weight: 11–10. Jockey: Jason Maguire; trainer: Donald McCain, Jr. Colours: white cap, green and yellow checked vest with white sleeves.

- 2: Chelsea Harbour

Weight: 11–8. Jockey: Emmet Mullins; trainer: Tom Mullins (Ireland). Colours: white cap with black ring, orange vest with black star and orange and black diamond sleeves.

- 3: Snowy Morning

Weight: 11–8. Jockey: Andrew McNamara; trainer: Willie Mullins (Ireland). Colours: yellow and white checked cap, yellow and black striped vest with yellow sleeves.

- 4: Knowhere

Weight: 11–7. Jockey: Paddy Brennan; trainer: Nigel Twiston-Davies. Colours: green cap, vest and sleeves all with white stars.

- 5: Comply or Die

Weight: 11–6. Jockey: Timmy Murphy; trainer: David Pipe. Colours: white cap with blue stars, blue vest with green sleeves.

- 6: Ollie Magern

Weight: 11–6. Jockey: Mr Sam Waley-Cohen; trainer: Nigel Twiston-Davies. Colours: blue cap, blue vest with claret stars and claret sleeves.

- 7: Stan

Weight: 11–6. Jockey: Aidan Coleman; trainer: Venetia Williams. Colours: pink cap, blue vest with pink and blue striped sleeves.

- 8: Black Apalachi

Weight: 11–5. Jockey: Denis O'Regan; trainer: Dessie Hughes (Ireland). Colours: green cap with blue star, green vest with blue and green striped sleeves.

- 9: Hear The Echo

Weight: 11–5. Jockey: Davy Russell; trainer: Mouse Morris (Ireland). Colours: claret cap with white star, claret vest with white star and white stripe to claret sleeve.

- 10: Preists Leap

Weight: 11–5. Jockey Philip Enright; trainer: Gerald O'Leary (Ireland). Colours: blue cap with yellow star, blue vest with yellow star to chest and sleeves.

- 11: My Will

Weight: 11–4. Jockey: Ruby Walsh; trainer: Paul Nicholls. Colours: red cap, white and black vest with red sleeves.

- 12: Eurotrek

Weight: 11–3. Jockey: Sam Thomas; trainer: Paul Nicholls. Colours: light blue cap, vest and sleeves with dark blue diamond.

- 13: State Of Play

Weight: 11–2. Jockey: Paul Moloney; trainer: Evan Williams. Colours: blue cap, blue vest with pink stripe and blue sleeves.

- 14: Big Fella Thanks

Weight: 11–1. Jockey: Christian Williams; trainer: Paul Nicholls. Colours: dark green and white checked cap, dark green vest with a white V and light green sleeves.

- 15: Mon Mome

Weight: 11–0. Jockey: Liam Treadwell; trainer: Venetia Williams. Colours: green cap, green vest with blue and green stripe sleeves.

- 16: Silver Birch

Weight: 11–0. Jockey: Robbie Power; trainer: Gordon Elliott (Ireland). Colours: blue cap, black vest with blue star, blue sleeves with black stars.

- 17: Butlers Cabin

Weight: 10–13. Jockey: Tony McCoy; trainer: Jonjo O'Neill. Colours: white cap, green and orange striped vest and sleeves.

- 18: Offshore Account

Weight: 10–13. Jockey: David Casey; trainer: Charlie Swan. Colours: orange and green checked cap, white vest and sleeves with green flashes to shoulder.

- 19: Parsons Legacy

Weight: 10–12. Jockey: Richard Johnson; trainer: Philip Hobbs. Colours: yellow cap, claret vest with yellow stripe and yellow sleeves.

- 20: Reveillez

Weight: 10–12. Jockey: Mark Walsh; trainer: Jonjo O'Neill. Colours: orange cap, green and orange striped vest and sleeves.

- 21: Fundamentalist

Weight: 10–11. Jockey: David England; trainer: Nigel Twiston-Davies. Colours: orange cap, black and orange striped vest, black sleeves with orange stars.

- 22: Golden Flight

Weight: 10–11. Jockey: Barry Geraghty; trainer: Nicky Henderson. Colours: yellow cap with blue rings, yellow and blue striped vest and sleeves.

- 23: Lami

Weight: 10–11. Jockey: Robert Thornton; trainer: Enda Bolger (Ireland). Colours: yellow and green checked cap, orange and green striped vest and sleeves.

- 24: Battlecry

Weight: 10–10. Jockey: Tom Scudamore; trainer: Nigel Twiston-Davies. Colours: orange cap, yellow and green checked vest with white sleeves.

- 25: Cornish Sett

Weight: 10–10. Jockey: Nick Scholfield; trainer: Paul Nicholls. Colours: black and white checked cap, black and white stripe vest with black and white checked sleeves.

- 26: Fleet Street

Weight: 10–10. Jockey: Andrew Tinkler; trainer: Nicky Henderson. Colours: red and white checked cap, white vest and sleeves with red trim.

- 27: Musica Bella

Weight: 10–10. Jockey: Philip Carberry; trainer: Francois Cottin (France). Colours: orange cap, black and orange striped vest and sleeves.

- 28: Can't Buy Time

Weight: 10–9. Jockey: Noel Fehily; trainer: Jonjo O'Neill. Colours: blue cap, orange and green striped vest and sleeves.

- 29: Darkness

Weight: 10–9. Jockey: Wayne Hutchinson; trainer: Charles Egerton. Colours: pink cap, pink and grey diamonded vest and sleeves.

- 30: Irish Invader

Weight: 10–9. Jockey: Paul Townend; trainer: Willie Mullins (Ireland). Colours: blue cap with black spot, orange vest with white star and blue sleeves.

- 31: Rambling Minster

Weight: 10–9. Jockey: James Reveley; trainer: Keith Reveley. Colours: blue cap, white vest and sleeves with blue stars.

- 32: Southern Vic

Weight: 10–9. Jockey: Niall Madden; trainer: Ted Walsh (Ireland). Colours: yellow cap with black star, yellow and black checked vest with black sleeves.

- 33: Kilbeggan Blade

Weight: 10–7. Jockey: Graham Lee; trainer: Tom George. Colours: red cap with blue diamond, Blue vest and sleeves with red diamond.

- 34: Brooklyn Brownie

Weight: 10–6. Jockey: Phil Kinsella; trainer: Malcolm Jefferson. Colours: orange cap, brown and orange checked vest with brown sleeves.

- 35: Himalayan Trail

Weight: 10–6. Jockey: Paddy Flood; trainer: Jimmy Mangan (Ireland). Colours: red cap, blue vest with white V and blue sleeves with white stripes.

- 36: Arteea

Weight: 10–5. Jockey: Richie McGrath; trainer: David Pipe. Colours: white cap with black star, Green vest with white star and black and green striped sleeves.

- 37: Cerium

Weight: 10–5. Jockey: Keith Mercer; trainer: Paul Murphy. Colours: green cap, Green vest with white star and black and green striped sleeves

- 38: Idle Talk

Weight: 10–5. Jockey: Brian Harding; trainer: Donald McCain Jr. Colours: green cap, yellow and green checked vest with white sleeves.

- 39: Kelami

Weight: 10–5. Jockey: Derek Laverty; trainer: Lisa Williamson. Colours: red and white ringed cap, black vest with red and white striped sleeves.

- 40: Zabenz

Weight: 10–5. Jockey: Tom O'Brien; trainer: Philip Hobbs. Colours: green cap, beige vest and sleeves.

== Leading contenders ==
2007 Irish Grand National winner Butler's Cabin was made the favourite having fallen in the previous year's National when going well and in addition he had champion jockey Tony McCoy in the saddle. The favourite was still among a group of sixteen horses who still held serious chances with four fences to jump but he made a mistake at the 27th and was always struggling to get back on terms with those at the head of the group. After the race, jockey Tony McCoy said: "He ran OK. He's probably still a bit high in the handicap. From Becher's on the second circuit he was just starting to get a little bit tired and he made a lot of little mistakes late on."

My Will was made favourite for the race after finishing fifth in the Cheltenham Gold Cup but was sent off as joint-second favourite on the day with two-time winning rider Ruby Walsh in the saddle. Despite a series of jumping errors the horse turned for the home straight marginally leading an unusually large contending pack of sixteen horses and briefly looked to be on the way to victory at the penultimate flight. The horse was quickly passed by the eventual winner and took the last flight in third place where he remained, finishing 13¼ lengths behind the winner. Jockey Ruby Walsh said: "He was just hitting the fences low and I was really having to work hard at keeping him upright. We did well to stay on our feet."

Rambling Minster was identified as the 'trend' horse after winning the Blue Square Gold Cup at Haydock two months before the National. Despite ticking all the boxes the tipsters looked for in a potential National winner, he proved very disappointing in the race itself and was well to the rear when he was almost brought down at the 18th fence and was pulled up soon after. Jockey James Reveley said afterwards: "He didn't take to it and just didn't like it. He jumped OK until he made a mistake down the back and he was looking after himself after that so I pulled up going down the back on the second circuit."

Black Apalachi had been a faller in the 2008 Grand National but became popular when he won the Becher Chase over one circuit of the course in November and followed that by winning the Bobbyjo Chase in February. He went straight to the front from the start, taking the lead at the third fence where he remained for over a circuit. He was still three lengths clear and going well when he stumbled on landing over Becher's Brook and threw his rider Denis O'Reagan, who later said: "It was very disappointing – he was travelling well and jumping from fence to fence. I don't know what happened until I see a replay."

Comply Or Die was the defending champion and came within 12 lengths of being the first horse for over thirty years to win back-to-back Nationals. The horse jumped alongside Mon Mome at the final flight but was outpaced on the run-in. After, jockey Timmy Murphy said: "He ran a blinder. Apart from failing to get 10 lengths closer to the winner I have no complaints whatsoever."

State Of Play had won the 2006 Hennessy Cognac Gold Cup but appealed to his backers after winning the Charlie Hall Chase in November at Wetherby. The horse was among the leading eight throughout the race and was among four who shared the lead jumping the penultimate fence. He was unable to mount a challenge after that and finished fourth, 14 lengths behind the winner. Jockey Paul Moloney said of his race: "There was a moment when I thought I was going to win going to two out. You can't do it without the horse and I had a lot of confidence in him."

Big Fella Thanks was backed after winning the Sky Bet Chase in January and on race day ran a textbook National in mid-division on the first circuit before moving into a challenging position at the Canal Turn on the second circuit. The horse was always having to find a few lengths and was never quite able to get on terms with the leader before finishing sixth. Jockey Christian Williams regarded the race as a prep for a bigger bid next year, saying: "He'll be a year older next year, and perhaps on softer ground you never know. He's only a baby. I had AP [McCoy, on Butler's Cabin] upsides me so I knew I was in the right place. He's got a slight cut on his hind leg and that may have made a slight difference, but if he improves again and comes back with a nice weight next year he could go close."

Mon Mome was among the less-considered outsiders at 100–1 despite a good racing pedigree that had seen him sent off as favourite in the Welsh National in December. A disappointing run there and subsequent loss of form, in addition to his regular rider opting to ride Stan instead led the public to ignore the credentials which were seen as obvious after the event.

== Finishing order ==
Position	Horse	Jockey	Age	Handicap (st-lb)	SP	Distance	Prize money
1st	Mon Mome	Liam Treadwell	9	11–0	100/1	Won by 12 lengths	£506,970
2nd	Comply or Die	Timmy Murphy	10	11–6	14/1	1¼ lengths	£190,980
3rd	My Will	Ruby Walsh	9	11–4	8/1	4½ lengths	£95,580
4th	State of Play	Paul Moloney	9	11–2	14/1	¾ length	£47,790
5th	Cerium	Keith Mercer	8	10–5	100/1	4 lengths	£23,940
6th	Big Fella Thanks	Christian Williams	7	11–1	14/1	1¾ lengths	£11,970
7th	Butler's Cabin	Tony McCoy	9	10–13	7/1 favourite	¾ length	Nil
8th	Southern Vic	Niall Madden	10	10–9	33/1	5 lengths	Nil
9th	Snowy Morning	Andrew McNamara	9	11–8	33/1	9 lengths	Nil
10th	Arteea	Johnny Farrelly	10	10–5	200/1	4½ lengths	Nil
11th	Irish Invader	Paul Townend	8	10–9	16/1	3 lengths	Nil
12th	Idle Talk	Brian Harding	10	10–5	66/1	3½ lengths	Nil
13th	Darkness	Wayne Hutchinson	10	10–9	16/1	25 lengths	Nil
14th	Preists Leap	Philip Enright	9	11–5	100/1	24 lengths	Nil
15th	Offshore Account	David Casey	9	10–13	20/1	12 lengths	Nil
16th	Battlecry	Tom Scudamore	8	10–10	33/1	A distance	Nil
17th	Cornish Sett	Nick Scholfield	10	10–10	33/1	Last to complete	Nil

== Non-finishers ==
Fence	Horse	Jockey	Age	Handicap (st-lb)	SP	Fate
Run-in	Hear The Echo	Davy Russell	8	11–5	33/1	Collapsed
30th	L'ami	Robert Thornton	10	10–11	16/1	Pulled up
25th (Valentine's)	Knowhere	Paddy Brennan	11	11–7	50/1	Pulled up
22nd (Becher's Brook)	Black Apalachi	Denis O'Regan	10	11–5	11/1	Unseated rider
22nd (Becher's Brook)	Silver Birch	Robbie Power	12	11–0	40/1	Fell
22nd (Becher's Brook)	Parson's Legacy	Richard Johnson	11	10–12	20/1	Fell
22nd (Becher's Brook)	Kelami	Derek Laverty	11	10–5	200/1	Pulled up
21st	Fundamentalist	David England	11	10–11	100/1	Pulled up
21st	Kilbeggan Blade	Graham Lee	10	10–7	20/1	Pulled up
19th	Rambling Minster	James Reveley	11	10–9	8/1	Pulled up
18th	Can't Buy Time	Noel Fehily	7	10–9	33/1	Fell
18th	Fleet Street	Andrew Tinkler	10	10–10	100/1	Unseated rider
17th	Eurotrek	Sam Thomas	13	11–3	80/1	Pulled up
16th (Water Jump)	Zabenz	Tom O'Brien	12	10–5	100/1	Fell
15th (The Chair)	Cloudy Lane	Jason Maguire	9	11–10	50/1	Unseated rider
12th	Musica Bella	Phillip Carberry	9	10–10	66/1	Fell
7th (Foinavon)	Stan	Aidan Coleman	10	11–6	50/1	Fell
3rd	Chelsea Harbour	Emmet Mullins	9	11–8	40/1	Fell
3rd	Reveillez	Mark Walsh	10	10–12	100/1	Brought down
2nd	Ollie Magern	Mr. Sam Waley-Cohen	11	11–6	66/1	Fell
2nd	Brooklyn Brownie	Phil Kinsella	10	10–6	22/1	Fell
1st	Golden Flight	Barry Geraghty	10	10–11	66/1	Fell
1st	Himalayan Trail	Paddy Flood	10	10–6	28/1	Fell

== Broadcasting ==
Mon Mome has taken the lead now as they race towards the elbow. It's Mon Mome who's out in front here by four or five lengths. Comply Or Die battling on, then State of Play and My Will. But it's Mon Mome who's clearing away. Up towards the line now, and it's Mon Mome, Liam Treadwell who's going to win the Grand National at the first attempt! It's Mon Mome who's going to come home, a very, very easy winner by the best part of ten lengths.

— BBC commentator Jim McGrath describes the climax of the 2009 Grand National

The Grand National was accorded status as an event of national interest, listed on the Ofcom Code on Sports and Other Listed and Designated Events, therefore ensuring that the event is broadcast live on terrestrial television in the United Kingdom. The BBC broadcast the race for the 50th consecutive year. The winner, Mon Mome, was not mentioned in commentary at any stage on the first circuit, being named for the first time when in 12th place as the runners started the second circuit. The commentary team for the sixth consecutive year was Ian Bartlett, Tony O'Hehir, Darren Owen, and Jim McGrath who called the winner home for the 12th consecutive year.

The programme was presented by Clare Balding. 1,477 people lodged complaints to the BBC when, after the race, she asked winning rider Liam Treadwell to show his teeth to the camera and then suggested he would be able to get them "fixed" with his prize money. Balding later issued a public apology. On the evening before the following year's race, Treadwell was again interviewed by Balding for the BBC's The One Show in which he thanked her for her comments as it had led to him getting free dentistry resulting in a perfect smile.

Treadwell said of his winning ride: "It's an absolutely unbelievable finish, I had the perfect run through the race, he jumped brilliant for me. A couple of times loose horses fell upsides me and went under his legs but it didn't really affect the horse. He gave me such a great ride. He was an absolute pleasure to ride. He is so genuine."

Trainer Venetia Williams said: "How can you ever expect that in a race like this? I'm so proud of the horse. I'm so proud of Liam for giving him such a good ride, and the girl who looks after him as well. I'm so proud of everyone in the yard – I never get chance to praise them and give them the credit they deserve, it is all a team effort."

== Aftermath ==
Hear The Echo and Butlers Cabin both collapsed, the former on the run-in and the latter shortly after passing the finishing post. Both required oxygen treatment but Hear The Echo did not respond and died.

Bookmakers were delighted by the race result with a 100/1 winner. Ladbrokes spokesman David Williams said: "It was better than we could ever have dreamed of. Liam Treadwell was our saviour. A win for Walsh or McCoy would have seen a multi-million pound turnaround. The sun shone on Aintree and the sun shone on the bookies. If last year was one for the punters, 2009 was very much one for us."

== Quotes ==
- Keith Mercer (Cerium, fifth): "He was brilliant. He jumped magnificently and was in contention on the run to the second-last. it was an amazing feeling. I had just been hoping we would get round. He far surpassed my expectations and gave me an amazing spin."
- Niall Madden (Southern Vic, eighth): "He has run a great race, the ground was just too quick for him."
- Andrew McNamara (Snowy Morning, ninth): "We had a couple of bumps on the way round, but he ran a nice race."
- Johnny Farrelly (Arteea, tenth): "I had a good ride round and he jumped great."
- Paul Townend (Irish Invader, eleventh): "It was great. I think he just maybe didn't see it (the trip) out."
- Brian Harding (Idle Talk, twelfth): "He jumped round, but didn't get home. He gave me a great ride and he was pretty good over the fences, but didn't get home."
- Wayne Hutchinson (Darkness, thirteenth): "He gave me a good spin and he travelled away fine. He was just a bit on and off the bridle but you couldn't fault him over these fences. He's jumped economically and he galloped on round."
- Philip Enright (Preists Leap, fourteenth): "He gave me a great ride and jumped well. I thought I would go very close jumping the second-last, but he got very tired. I had to use him a bit more than I would have liked early on because of the ground. He ran well and should be back next year."
- David Casey (Offshore Account, fifteenth): "I had a great ride round and he jumped so well, but he hadn't run over fences for over a year and it told on him in the end. He's still a good horse to look forward to."
- Tom Scudamore (Battlecry, sixteenth): "He gave me a great spin for a circuit and a half, but got tired from Becher's second time. He gave me a great thrill for a long way."
- Nick Scholfield (Cornish Sett, seventeenth and last): "He got round once again and gave me a great spin and jumped well in the main, but just didn't seem to get the trip this year. He was on his nose once or twice but is so clever."
- Graham Lee (Kilbeggan Blade, pulled up before 21st): "Not much happened in the race for me and I pulled up the one before Becher's second time."
- Phil Kinsella (Brooklyn Brownie, fell at 2nd): "All sorts of things go through your head as you watch them gallop away from you. He was great down to the first and met it lovely and gave me a lot of confidence, but he didn't meet the second as well and that was that."
- Robbie Power (Silver Birch, fell at 22nd): "It is disappointing, he just got a bit too close to Becher's, caught the top and just couldn't get his front end out. But the old lad was travelling really well and jumping for fun and he ran a big race."
- Richard Johnson (Parsons Legacy, fell at 22nd): "I wish I hadn't fallen. He was dead right, but it was too far out to tell where we might have finished."
- Barry Geraghty (Golden Flight, fell at 1st): "That was a bit of an anti-climax."
- Sam Thomas (Eurotrek, pulled up before 17th): "We were never going well and pulled up after the water."
- Tom O'Brien (Zabenz, fell at 16th): "We fell at the water. Until then we were going fine."
- Paddy Brennan (Knowhere, pulled up before 25th): "All I've got to report is that he was never travelling."
- David England (Fundamentalist, pulled up before 21st): "He was good. He ran well and jumped very well, even though he was a big outsider. I pulled him just before Becher's second time, but he's run really well for an old lad."
- Noel Fehily (Can't Buy Time, fell at 18th): "He just got in a bit deep. He jumped well up to that point."
- Andrew Tinkler (Fleet Street, unseated rider at 18th): "We went a circuit and a bit, then he hit a fence really hard and unseated me. He'd given me a fair ride up to then but we were middle to back and going nowhere."
- Sam Waley-Cohen (Ollie Magern, fell at 2nd): "He just got in under it, didn't get high enough, and couldn't get his landing gear down."
- Aidan Coleman (Stan, fell at 7th): "He didn't enjoy himself and fell at Foinavon."
- Robert Thornton (L'Ami, pulled up before last): "He gave me a great ride, but just didn't get home and I pulled him up."
- Derek Laverty (Kelami, pulled up before 22nd): "He gave me a great spin. They went a great gallop early doors and I was handy, but he is an old horse and began to feel the pinch on the second circuit. I noticed three horses disappear at Becher's and thought it best to pull him up. We were someway behind."
- Emmet Mullins (Chelsea Harbour, fell at 2nd): "He got his back up too high and came down too steeply. But he is grand and so I am. I am looking forward to next time."
- Jason Maguire (Cloudy Lane, unseated at The Chair): "He landed on the fence, but that is the National isn't it? I couldn't have been happier up to that point because he was jumping so well."
- Paddy Flood (Himalayan Trail, fell at 1st): "We didn't get very far did we!"
- Mark Walsh (Reveillez, brought down at the 3rd): "It was disappointing to (only) get as far as the third, but he is a nice horse."
- Philip Carberry (Musica Bella, fell at 12th): "She just got a bit close got her hind legs caught and flipped. She is unlucky, she was jumping quite well up to then."

Tony McCoy was the most experienced rider in the race for the third consecutive year, having taken over from Carl Llewellyn after the 2006 race, though he had previously shared the honour with Mick Fitzgerald and Paul Carberry. McCoy was having his fourteenth ride in the race, joining an exclusive club of just thirteen riders to have reached that landmark, however he also shared the unwanted record with Jeff King of being the only two riders among the thirteen not to have won or been runner-up in any of their fourteen rides.

Eight riders made their Grand National debut, including Liam Treadwell, the twenty-second rider to win at the first attempt and the second in the 21st century. Paul Townend and Philip Enright also completed the course while at the other extreme, Phil Kinsella got no further than the second fence. Emmet Mullins, Mark Walsh, James Reveley and Derek Lavery also took their first rides in the race.
