= 2010 Grand National =

English steeplechase horse race

- Grand National
- Location: Aintree Racecourse
- Date: 10 April 2010
- Winning horse: (Republic of Ireland) Don't Push It
- Starting price: 10/1 JF
- Jockey: (Northern Ireland) Tony McCoy
- Trainer: (Republic of Ireland) Jonjo O'Neill
- Owner: (Republic of Ireland) J. P. McManus
- Conditions: Good (good to soft in places)

External videos
- Replay of the 2010 Grand National in full Racing TV, YouTube

The 2010 Grand National (officially known as the John Smith's Grand National for sponsorship reasons) was the 163rd renewal of the Grand National horse race that took place at Aintree near Liverpool, England, on 10 April 2010.

The main race was held at 16:15 BST and was won by Don't Push It, ridden by Tony McCoy, five lengths ahead of Black Apalachi in second, and twenty ahead of State of Play in third.

It was McCoy's first win in the Grand National at his fifteenth attempt. Don't Push It started the race as 10–1 joint-favourite, having been backed down from 20–1 in the hours prior to the race. In the process of winning, McCoy avoided equalling the record for most rides in the National without winning, held by Jeff King.

The main race was seen by the largest attendance at Aintree since 2005, with a crowd of 70,341 on the day, and a total of 150,426 attending over the course of the three-day meeting.

== Race card ==
- 1: Madison Du Berlais

Weight: 11–10. Jockey: Tom Scudamore; trainer: David Pipe. Colours: purple, yellow triple diamond, yellow sleeves with red armlets and cap.

- 2: Mon Mome

Weight: 11–7. Jockey: Aidan Coleman; trainer: Venetia Williams. Colours: green, purple armlets

- 3: Vic Venturi

Weight: 11–6. Jockey: Roger Loughran; trainer: Dessie Hughes (Ireland). Colours: black, yellow diamond on body and cap, diamonds on sleeves.

- 4: Black Apalachi

Weight: 11–6. Jockey: Denis O'Regan; trainer: Dessie Hughes (Ireland). Colours: green, blue chevrons on sleeves, blue star on cap.

- 5: Joe Lively

Weight: 11–6. Jockey: Joe Tizzard; trainer: Colin Tizzard. Colours: yellow with red diamond, quartered cap.

- 6: Don't Push It

Weight: 11–5. Jockey: Tony McCoy; trainer: Jonjo O'Neill. Colours: green and yellow hoops, white cap.

- 7: Comply or Die

Weight: 11–5. Jockey: Timmy Murphy; trainer: David Pipe. Colours: royal blue, green sleeves, white cap with blue spots.

- 8: Niche Market

Weight: 11–4. Jockey: Harry Skelton; trainer: Bob Buckler. Colours: orange and blue quarters, hooped sleeves, quartered cap.

- 9: Tricky Trickster

Weight: 11–4. Jockey: Richard Johnson; trainer: Paul Nicholls. Colours: pink, large purple spots, hooped sleeves. Note: Johnson replaced Barry Geraghty as the jockey of Tricky Trickster following an injury to Ruby Walsh. Geraghty switched to ride joint-favourite Big Fella Thanks.

- 10: Made in Taipan

Weight: 11–4. Jockey: Niall Madden; trainer: Tom Mullins (Ireland). Colours: orange with black star, diablo sleeves, white and black hooped cap.

- 11: Dream Alliance

Weight: 11–3. Jockey: Tom O'Brien; trainer: Philip Hobbs. Colours: grey with maroon epaulettes and armbands, hooped cap.

- 12: Cloudy Lane

Weight: 11–3. Jockey: Jason Maguire; trainer: Donald McCain, Jr. Colours: green and yellow quartered, white sleeves and cap.

- 13: Nozic

Weight: 11–3. Jockey: Liam Treadwell; trainer: Paul Nicholls. Colours: blue, white disc, stars on sleeves and star on cap.

- 14: My Will

Weight: 11–2. Jockey: Nick Scholfield; trainer: Paul Nicholls. Colours: black and white halves, red sleeves and cap.

- 15: Pablo Du Charmil

Weight: 11–2. Jockey: Danny Cook; trainer: David Pipe. Colours: purple, yellow chevron, diablo sleeves.

- 16: Ballyholland

Weight: 11–0. Jockey: Andrew McNamara; trainer: Colin McBratney (Ireland). Colours: white, yellow stripe, quartered cap.

- 17: Backstage

Weight: 11–0. Jockey: Davy Condon; trainer: Gordon Elliott (Ireland). Colours: light blue, orange epaulettes, light blue and purple checked cap.

- 18: Beat the Boys

Weight: 11–0. Jockey: Brian Hughes; trainer: Nigel Twiston-Davies. Colours: pink, blue diamond, diablo sleeves, pink star on blue cap.

- 19: Priests Leap

Weight: 11–0. Jockey: Philip Enright; trainer: Tom O'Leary (Ireland). Colours: blue, yellow star, stars on sleeves, star on cap.

- 20: Snowy Morning

Weight: 10–13. Jockey: David Casey; trainer: Willie Mullins (Ireland). Colours: yellow, black braces, yellow and white quartered cap.

- 21: Can't Buy Time

Weight: 10–13. Jockey: Richie McLernon; trainer: Jonjo O'Neill. Colours: green and yellow hoops, white star on green cap.

- 22: Big Fella Thanks

Weight: 10–12. Jockey: Barry Geraghty; trainer: Paul Nicholls. Colours: purple with grey hooped sleeves. Note: Twice-winning jockey Ruby Walsh was originally scheduled to ride Big Fella Thanks but was ruled out when he was injured in a heavy fall on Celestial Halo in the 2:50 pm race earlier in the day.

- 23: State of Play

Weight: 10–11. Jockey: Paul Moloney; trainer: Evan Williams. Colours: blue with pink hoop.

- 24: Character Building

Weight: 10–11. Jockey: Nina Carberry; trainer: John Quinn. Colours: pink with purple crossbelts, hooped sleeves and cap.

- 25: Ellerslie George

Weight: 10–10. Jockey: Christian Williams; trainer: Nick Mitchell. Colours: blue with green hoop and cap, red sleeves.

- 26: Eric's Charm

Weight: 10–9. Jockey: Wayne Hutchinson; trainer: Oliver Sherwood. Colours: yellow and pink diamonds, yellow sleeves and cap.

- 27: King Johns Castle

Weight: 10–9. Jockey: Paul Carberry; trainer: Arthur Moore (Ireland). Colours: green and yellow hoops, red cap.

- 28: Conna Castle

Weight: 10–9. Jockey: Sean Flanagan; trainer: Jimmy Mangan (Ireland). Colours: orange and light blue diamonds, orange sleeves and cap with blue stars.

- 29: Ballyfitz

Weight: 10–9. Jockey: David England; trainer: Nigel Twiston-Davies. Colours: light blue and maroon diablo and quartered cap, light blue sleeves.

- 30: Ollie Magern

Weight: 10–9. Jockey: Tom Molloy; trainer: Nigel Twiston-Davies. Colours: light blue, maroon stars and sleeves.

- 31: Arbor Supreme

Weight: 10–8. Jockey: Paul Townend; trainer: Willie Mullins (Ireland). Colours: green and yellow hoops, blue cap.

- 32: Maljimar

Weight: 10–8. Jockey: Daryl Jacob; trainer: Nick Williams. Colours: orange with black star on body and cap.

- 33: The Package

Weight: 10–7. Jockey: Graham Lee; trainer: David Pipe. Colours: royal blue, emerald green sleeves, red cap.

- 34: Piraya

Weight: 10–7. Jockey: Johnny Farrelly; trainer: David Pipe. Colours: white, large red spots, armlets and quartered cap.

- 35: Irish Raptor

Weight: 10–7. Jockey: Paddy Brennan; trainer: Nigel Twiston-Davies. Colours: green, yellow stars, striped sleeves, blue and yellow cap.

- 36: Cerium

Weight: 10–5. Jockey: Davy Russell; trainer: Paul Murphy. Colours: green, white star, black striped sleeves, white cap with black star.

- 37: Palypso De Creek

Weight: 10–6. Jockey: Tom Siddall; trainer: Charlie Longsdon. Colours: blue, dark green sleeves and cap.

- 38: Hello Bud

Weight: 10–6. Jockey: Sam Twiston-Davies; trainer: Nigel Twiston-Davies. Colours: white, blue spotted body and sleeves, striped cap.

- 39: Flintoff

Weight: 10–5. Jockey: Andrew Tinkler; trainer: Venetia Williams. Colours: blue, pink hooped sleeves and cap.

- 40: Royal Rosa

Weight: 10–5. Jockey: Wilson Renwick; trainer: Howard Johnson. Colours: black and beige halved, beige sleeves with black chevrons, beige cap

Originally, Royal Rosa was a reserve, but ran because of the withdrawal of Abbeybraney. Silver Birch was originally due to be the first reserve, when it was clear there were to be no withdrawals, Gordon Elliott took out Silver Birch so Mr Wylie could run Royal Rosa instead of Abbeybraney, and Silver Birch ran in the Topham Chase instead.

== Finishing order ==
Position	Name	Rider	Age	Weight	Starting price	Distance	Prize money
1st	Don't Push It	Tony McCoy	10	11-05	10/1 JF	Winner by 5 lengths	£521,052
2nd	Black Apalachi	Denis O'Regan	11	11-06	14/1	5 lengths	£196,285
3rd	State of Play	Paul Moloney	10	10–11	16/1	20 lengths	£98,235
4th	Big Fella Thanks	Barry Geraghty	8	10–12	10/1 JF	3 lengths	£49,117
5th	Hello Bud	Sam Twiston-Davies	12	10-06	20/1	7 lengths	£24,605
6th	Snowy Morning	David Casey	10	10–13	14/1	1 1/2 lengths	£12,302
7th	Character Building	Nina Carberry	10	10–11	16/1	Neck	£6,105
8th	Cloudy Lane	Jason Maguire	10	11-03	25/1	12 lengths	£3,145
9th	Tricky Trickster	Richard Johnson	7	11-04	16/1	3/4 length	Nil
10th	Joe Lively	Joe Tizzard	11	11-06	33/1	Short head	Nil
11th	Cerium	Davy Russell	9	10-06	50/1	A distance	Nil
12th	Comply or Die	Timmy Murphy	11	10-05	12/1	8 lengths	Nil
13th	Piraya	Johnny Farrelly	7	10-07	100/1	A distance	Nil
14th	Priests Leap	Philip Enright	10	11-00	100/1	Last to complete	Nil

== Non-finishers ==
Fence	Name	Rider	Age	Weight	Starting price	Fate
Start line	King John's Castle	Paul Carberry	11	10-09	28/1	Refused to start
1st	Eric's Charm	Wayne Hutchinson	12	10-09	33/1	Fell
2nd	Pablo Du Charmil	Danny Cook	9	11-02	100/1	Fell
4th	My Will	Nick Scholfield	10	11-02	20/1	Fell
5th	Made in Taipan	Niall Madden	8	11-04	100/1	Fell
8th (Canal Turn)	Can't Buy Time	Richie McLernon	8	10–13	33/1	Unseated rider
14th	Irish Raptor	Paddy Brennan	11	10-07	33/1	Fell
14th	Royal Rosa	Wilson Renwick	11	10-05	66/1	Unseated rider
15th (The Chair)	Arbor Supreme	Paul Townend	8	10-08	16/1	Unseated rider
19th	Madison Du Berlais	Tom Scudamore	9	11–10	50/1	Unseated rider
19th	Beat The Boys	Brian Hughes	9	11-00	66/1	Pulled up
19th	The Package	Graham Lee	7	10-07	14/1	Unseated rider
20th	Vic Venturi	Roger Loughran	10	11-06	25/1	Fell when hampered
20th	Nozic	Liam Treadwell	9	11-03	40/1	Unseated rider when hampered
20th	Backstage	Davy Condon	8	11-00	25/1	Unseated rider when hampered
21st	Flintoff	Andrew Tinkler	9	10-05	50/1	Pulled up
22nd (Becher's Brook)	Ballyfitz	David England	10	10-09	50/1	Fell
22nd (Becher's Brook)	Maljimar	Daryl Jacob	10	10-08	28/1	Fell
23rd (Foinavon's)	Ellerslie George	Christian Williams	10	10–10	66/1	Unseated rider
24th (Canal Turn)	Dream Alliance	Tom O'Brien	9	11-03	16/1	Pulled up
26th	Mon Mome	Aidan Coleman	10	11-07	14/1	Fell
27th	Palypso De Creek	Tom Siddall	7	10-06	66/1	Fell
28th	Ballyholland	Andrew McNamara	9	11-00	28/1	Pulled up
29th	Niche Market	Harry Skelton	9	11-04	16/1	Pulled up
29th	Conna Castle	Sean Flanagan	11	10-09	100/1	Pulled up
29th	Ollie Magern	Tom Molloy	12	10-09	100/1	Pulled up

== Trivia ==
For the first time since 2005, there were no equine fatalities in the main race. In each of the previous four years there was one casualty.

Plaisir d'Estruval and Prudent Honour both died instantly after jumping Valentine's, the 13th fence in the Topham Chase on 9 April, a handicap over two miles and 5 1/2 furlongs. Both horses broke their necks. Earlier the same day, in the grade one Melling Chase over standard chase fences on the Mildmay track, Schindlers Hunt was put down after fracturing a leg in a fall at the third fence. Schindlers Hunt's jockey Paddy Flood broke his collarbone in the fall; the other jockeys were unhurt.

Coral bookmakers decided to refund bets placed on race-day for King John's Castle. The horse was bidding to become the first grey to win the National since 1961, but refused to run when the race started. Although under betting rules customers bets should have been classified as losers, Coral decided to make a goodwill refund gesture to their customers.

== Jockeys and quotes ==
Selected quotes from the jockeys including winner at the fifteenth attempt, Tony McCoy, 17-year-old Sam Twiston-Davies who was aiming to become the second-youngest winning jockey ever, and Nina Carberry attempting to be first female rider to win the race:

- Tony McCoy (Don't Push It, first): "If you get enough goes at something and you keep going, once you're in there you've always got a chance. I'm delighted for JP [McManus, owner] as he's the best supporter this game has ever had and ever will have, and I'm very privileged to ride a Grand National winner in his colours."
- Denis O'Regan (Black Apalachi, second): "My fella's a tremendous horse and he gave me a tremendous feel. He just loves bowling along and loves this place. He was a bit keen early on but once he settled into a lovely rhythm he was fantastic. It's a pleasure to ride a horse like him round here."
- Paul Moloney (State of Play, third): "It was a serious run from a serious horse who's been very good to me – and he might win it next year, please God."
- Barry Geraghty (late replacement jockey for Big Fella Thanks, fourth): "That was brilliant. He galloped from end to end, the best ride I've ever had round here. But if you can't have the winner then it's good to see AP [McCoy] win it."
- Sam Twiston-Davies (Hello Bud, fifth): "That was brilliant. The horse has been a real star and has jumped from fence to fence."
- Nina Carberry (Character Building, seventh): "He couldn't lay up and the plan was to give him a chance. I thought I had a really great chance of being in the money and in the first three over the Canal Turn, but he got tapped for toe and in the end I just got done for sixth. He ran a great race had it been softer he might have come back to them a bit more. Hopefully he'll come back next year."

Tony McCoy lined up as the most experienced rider in the race for the fourth consecutive year, having taken over as senior rider from Carl Llewellyn after the 2006 National. It had also been an honour he had shared for a time with Mick Fitzgerald and Paul Carberry. 2010 also marked McCoy's fifteenth ride in the National, a feat previously achieved by only nine other riders, however, defeat this year would have seen McCoy become only the second rider to take fifteen rides in the race without ever winning. His ultimate victory saw this dubious honour remain solely Jeff King's.

At the opposite extreme, nine riders made their Grand National debut, though only one, Sam Twiston-Davies managed to complete the course, finishing fifth. Danny Cook's first National ended at the second fence while Ritchie McLernon, Brian Hughes, Roger Loughran, Tom Siddall, Harry Skelton and Tom Molloy were also taking part for the first time.

== Broadcasting ==
As the Grand National was accorded the status as an event of national interest within the United Kingdom and was listed on the Ofcom Code on Sports and Other Listed and Designated Events, the event had to be shown on free-to-air terrestrial television in the UK. As with previous years the rights to broadcast the race were held by the BBC and the race, along with several others were shown on BBC One. It was also the first horse race in the UK to be broadcast in high definition on the BBC HD channel. The BBC's coverage was produced by Sunset + Vine who, with the aid of the SiS outside broadcast unit, provided coverage of fifteen races throughout the three-day meeting.

Black Apalachi and Don't Push It race towards the elbow; a titanic struggle. They're clear of Big Fella Thanks. They're on the run-in for home. McCoy is rousting Don't Push It. He's galvanising him; he's started to get a real tune out of him! He's going to at last win the Grand National. It's Don't Push It, Tony McCoy at the fifteenth attempt. He wins the Grand National!

— BBC commentator Jim McGrath describes the climax of the 2010 Grand National

Clare Balding served as anchor presenter for the fifth consecutive year with Rishi Persad providing interviews from the jockey's room as well as taking a closer look at the horses in the paddock with Richard Dunwoody. Mick Fitzgerald guided viewers through the course as well as providing post-race analysis from all the build-up races. Richard Pitman provided nostalgia with interviews with several famous names from the history of the race, including an interview with his ex-wife Jenny Pitman while Lizzie Greenwood-Hughes interviewed spectators in the stands for unusual and interesting stories. John Parrott and Gary Wiltshire completed the team with news from the betting ring.

The commentary team for the 2010 Grand National consisted of Ian Bartlett, Darren Owen and Jim McGrath, who called the winner home for the thirteenth consecutive year. This was the first time for six years that the team had been reduced from four to three with Tony O'Hehir being dropped in what the BBC called a cost-cutting exercise. As is tradition, anchor presenter Balding conducted the interviews with the winning connections while Bartlett, Dunwoody and Fitzgerald then took the viewers through a detailed rerun of the race.

BBC radio also covered the race live for the seventy-ninth time as part of its wider Five Live Sports broadcast. Mark Pougatch presented the programme live from Aintree with race commentary called by Cornelius Lysaght and John Hunt. The race was also covered by Racing UK into bookmakers' offices throughout the UK and Ireland using alternative camera shots from the BBC with their own commentary team.
