= George Stevens Handicap Chase =

Steeplechase horse race in Great Britain

George Stevens Handicap Chase
2025
Blaze The Way	L'Homme Presse	The Short Go

Previous years
2024
King Turgeon	Our Power	Chianti Classico
2023
Broadway Boy	Threeunderthrufive	Protektorat
2022
Eva's Oskar	Spiritofthegames	Undersupervision
2021
Commodore	Mister Fogpatches	Court Master

2020-2011
2020
Storm Control	Potters Legend	Court Maid
2019
Cogry	Rock The Kasbah	West Approach
2018
Cogry	Singlefarmpayment	Rolling Dylan
2017
Robinsfirth	Shanroe Santos	Southfield Theatre
2016
Theatre Guide	Perfect Candidate	Bally Longford
2015
Aachen	Wonderful Charm	Mon Parrain
2014
Benbane Head	The Ould Lad	Cowards Close
2013
Monbeg Dude	Theatre Guide	Pigeon Island
2012
Master Overseer	Quartz De Thaix	Planet of Sound
2011
Shakalakaboomboom	Knockara Beau	Mon Parrain

2010-2003
2010
Midnight Chase	Presenting Forever	Exmoor Ranger
2009
The Package	The Tother One	Any Currency
2008
Mon Mome	Star De Mohaison	Possol
2007
Over The Creek	Simon	Monkerhostin
2006
D'Argent	New Alco	My Will
2005
Royal Auclair	All in the Stars	Fork Lightning
2004
Therealbandit	Royal Auclair	Frenchman's Creek
2003
Kingscliff	Haut Cercy	Marlborough

The George Stevens Handicap Chase is a Premier Handicap National Hunt steeplechase in Great Britain which is open to horses aged four years or older. It is run on the New Course at Cheltenham over a distance of about 3 miles and 2½ furlongs (5,230 metres). It is a handicap race, and is scheduled to take place each year in December.

The race was first run in 2003 and was awarded Grade 3 status in 2011. It has been run under various sponsored titles during its history. It was re-classified as a Premier Handicap from the 2022 running when Grade 3 status was renamed by the BHA. It gained its registered title in 2026, honouring five-time Grand National-winning jockey George Stevens who died on his way from Prestbury to his home at Cleeve Hill.

== Records ==
Most successful horse (2 wins):

- Cogry – 2018, 2019

Leading jockey (3 wins):

- Sam Twiston-Davies - Cogry (2018, 2019), Broadway Boy (2023)

Leading trainer (4 wins):

- David Pipe – Over The Creek (2007), The Package (2009), Master Overseer (2012), King Turgeon (2024)

== Winners ==
Year	Winner	Age	Weight	Jockey	Trainer
2003	Kingscliff	6	11-02	Andrew Thornton	Robert Alner
2004	Therealbandit	7	11-09	Timmy Murphy	Martin Pipe
2005	Royal Auclair	8	11-05	Liam Heard	Paul Nicholls
2006	D'Argent	9	10-05	Robert Thornton	Alan King
2007	Over The Creek	8	10-04	Christian Williams	David Pipe
2008	Mon Mome	8	10-11	Aidan Coleman	Venetia Williams
2009	The Package	6	10-00	Timmy Murphy	David Pipe
2010	Midnight Chase	8	11-03	Dougie Costello	Neil Mulholland
2011	Shakalakaboomboom	7	11-00	Barry Geraghty	Nicky Henderson
2012	Master Overseer	9	10-00	Tom Scudamore	David Pipe
2013	Monbeg Dude	8	11-00	Tom Scudamore	Michael Scudamore
2014	Benbane Head	10	09-11	Conor Shoemark	Martin Keighley
2015	Aachen	11	09-09	Charlie Deutsch	Venetia Williams
2016	Theatre Guide	9	11-04	Paddy Brennan	Colin Tizzard
2017	Robinsfirth	8	11-06	Robbie Power	Colin Tizzard
2018	Cogry	9	10-12	Sam Twiston-Davies	Nigel Twiston-Davies
2019	Cogry	10	11-01	Sam Twiston-Davies	Nigel Twiston-Davies
2020	Storm Control	7	10-03	Richard Patrick	Kerry Lee
2021	Commodore	9	10-00	Charlie Deutsch	Venetia Williams
2022	Eva's Oskar	8	11-12	Alan Johns	Tim Vaughan
2023	Broadway Boy	5	10-09	Sam Twiston-Davies	Nigel Twiston-Davies
2024	King Turgeon	6	10-04	Jack Tudor	David Pipe
2025	Blaze The Way	7	10-04	Danny Mullins	Margaret Mullins

== See also ==
- Horse racing in Great Britain
- List of British National Hunt races
