= 2006 Cheltenham Gold Cup =

The 2006 Cheltenham Gold Cup was a horse race which took place at Cheltenham on Friday 17 March 2006. It was the 78th running of the Cheltenham Gold Cup, and it was won by War of Attrition. The winner was ridden by Conor O'Dwyer and trained by Mouse Morris. The pre-race favourite Beef Or Salmon finished eleventh.

For the first time in the race's history the first three finishers – War of Attrition, Hedgehunter and Forget the Past – were all trained in Ireland.

== Race details ==
- Sponsor: Totesport
- Winner's prize money: £228,080.00
- Going: Good
- Number of runners: 22
- Winner's time: 6m 31.7s

== Full result ==
	*	Horse	Age	Jockey	Trainer ^{†}	SP
1		War of Attrition	7	Conor O'Dwyer	Mouse Morris (IRE)	15/2
2	2½	Hedgehunter	10	Ruby Walsh	Willie Mullins (IRE)	16/1
3	7	Forget the Past	8	Barry Geraghty	Michael O'Brien (IRE)	9/1
4	¾	L'Ami	7	Mick Fitzgerald	François Doumen (FR)	10/1
5	½	Take the Stand	10	Tony Dobbin	Peter Bowen	20/1
6	½	Monkerhostin	9	Richard Johnson	Philip Hobbs	13/2
7	1½	Sir Rembrandt	10	Andrew Thornton	Robert Alner	25/1
8	3	Royal Emperor	10	Dominic Elsworth	Sue Smith	40/1
9	nk	Royal Auclair	9	Christian Williams	Paul Nicholls	20/1
10	2	Kingscliff	9	Robert Walford	Robert Alner	12/1
11	¾	Beef Or Salmon	10	Paul Carberry	Michael Hourigan (IRE)	4/1 fav
12	17	Tikram	9	Jamie Moore	Gary L. Moore	100/1
13	1½	Joes Edge	9	Keith Mercer	Ferdy Murphy	100/1
14	7	Ballycassidy	10	Graham Lee	Peter Bowen	100/1
15	5	Iznogoud	10	Tom Scudamore	Martin Pipe	200/1
16	½	Cornish Rebel	9	Joe Tizzard	Paul Nicholls	16/1
17	10	Ollie Magern	8	Carl Llewellyn	Nigel Twiston-Davies	33/1
18	5	Lord of Illusion	9	Jason Maguire	Tom George	33/1
PU	Fence 21	Limerick Boy	8	Sam Thomas	Venetia Williams	150/1
PU	Fence 21	One Knight	10	Paddy Brennan	Philip Hobbs	20/1
PU	Fence 18	Iris's Gift	9	Tony McCoy	Jonjo O'Neill	16/1
UR	Fence 10	Celestial Gold	8	Timmy Murphy	Martin Pipe	16/1

* The distances between the horses are shown in lengths or shorter. nk = neck; PU = pulled-up; UR = unseated rider.
† Trainers are based in Great Britain unless indicated.
Note: Fence 20 was omitted due to the injured jockey Timmy Murphy, unseated at the fence on the first circuit.

== Winner's details ==
Further details of the winner, War of Attrition:

- Foaled: 7 May 1999 in Ireland
- Sire: Presenting; Dam: Una Juna (Good Thyne)
- Owner: Gigginstown House Stud
- Breeder: Bridget Murphy
