= Regal Encore Handicap Chase =

Steeplechase horse race in Britain

- Class: Premier Handicap
- Location: Ascot Racecourse, Ascot, Berkshire, England
- Inaugurated: 2006
- Race type: Steeplechase
- Sponsor: Sodexo
- Website: www.ascot.co.uk

Race information
- Distance: 2m 7f 185y (4791 metres)
- Surface: Turf
- Track: Right-handed
- Qualification: Four-years-old and up
- Weight: Handicap; Maximum: 11 st 12 lb
- Purse: £100,000 (2025); 1st: £56,950

Regal Encore Handicap Chase
2026
Viroflay	Your Darling	Tapley

Previous years
2025
Henry's Friend	The Changing Man	Blow Your Wad
2024
Chianti Classico	Highstakesplayer	Neon Moon
2023
Victtorino	Two For Gold	Eldorado Allen
2022
Our Power	Danny Kirwan	Tea Clipper
2021
Larry	Checkitout	Regal Encore

2020-2011
2020
Regal Encore	Whatmore	Militarian
2019
Vinndication	Regal Encore	Black Corton
2018
Traffic Fluide	Art Mauresque	Go Conquer
2017
Go Conquer	Rock Gone	Braqueur D'or
2016
Antony	Junction Fourteen	Saphir Du Rheu
2015
Pendra	Double Ross	Fox Appeal
2014
What A Warrior	Black Thunder	Merry King
2013
Houblon Des Obeaux	Merry King	Triolo D'Alene
2012
Roberto Goldback	Duke of Lucca	Alfie Spinner
2011
Exmoor Ranger	Razor Royale	Promising Anshan

2010-2006
2010
Massini's Maguire	Take The Breeze	From Dawn To Dusk
2009
The Last Derby	Aimigayle	Shining Gale
2008
Roll Along	Air Force One	Gungadu
2007
Harris Bay	Without A Doubt	Hoo La Baloo
2006
See You Sometime	Zabenz	Sweet Diversion

The Regal Encore Handicap Chase is a Premier Handicap National Hunt race in Great Britain. It is a handicap steeplechase and is run at Ascot in late October or early November, over a distance of about 3 miles (2 miles, 7 furlongs and 185 yards, or 4,796 metres).

== History ==
The race was first run as the United House Gold Cup on 28 October 2006 as a Class 2 race. It was worth £100,000 and was run over three miles. In 2009 the race was upgraded to Listed class and was further upgraded to Grade 3 in 2011. Sodexo sponsored the race from 2015 to 2020 and Bateaux London were sponsors in 2021 and 2022. Sodexo returned for a further period of sponsorship in 2023. The race was given the registered title of the Regal Encore Handicap Chase in 2026 in honour of Regal Encore, who ran 18 times at Ascot, including four wins. The race is now run as the Sodexo Live! Regal Encore Handicap Chase.

== Records ==
Most successful horse:

- no horse has won the race more than once

Leading jockey (3 wins):

- Barry Geraghty – Roll Along (2008), Roberto Goldback (2012), Pendra (2015)

Leading trainer (3 wins):

- Gary Moore - Antony (2016), Traffic Fluide (2018), Larry (2021)
- Widest winning margin – Roberto Goldback (2012) – 9 lengths
- Narrowest winning margin – Harris Bay (2007) – neck
- Most runners – 17, in 2011
- Fewest runners – 9, in 2007

== Winners ==
Year	Winner	Age	Weight	Jockey	Trainer
2006	See You Sometime	11	10–08	Wayne Kavanagh	Seamus Mullins
2007	Harris Bay	8	10–07	Timmy Murphy	Henrietta Knight
2008	Roll Along	8	11–01	Barry Geraghty	Carl Llewellyn
2009	The Last Derby	5	10–03	Liam Treadwell	Eoin Griffin
2010	Massini's Maguire	9	11–03	Tom Scudamore	David Pipe
2011	Exmoor Ranger	9	10-10	Andrew Glassonbury	Victor Dartnall
2012	Roberto Goldback	10	10-10	Barry Geraghty	Nicky Henderson
2013	Houblon Des Obeaux	6	11–03	Aidan Coleman	Venetia Williams
2014	What A Warrior	7	10–06	Harry Skelton	Dan Skelton
2015	Pendra	7	10–07	Barry Geraghty	Charlie Longsdon
2016	Antony	6	10–01	Jamie Moore	Gary Moore
2017	Go Conquer	8	11–00	Aidan Coleman	Jonjo O'Neill
2018	Traffic Fluide	8	11–12	Josh Moore	Gary Moore
2019	Vinndication	6	11–00	David Bass	Kim Bailey
2020	Regal Encore	12	10-10	Richie McLernon	Anthony Honeyball
2021	Larry	8	10–00	Jamie Moore	Gary Moore
2022	Our Power	7	11–02	Charlie Deutsch	Sam Thomas
2023	Victtorino	5	10–12	Charlie Deutsch	Venetia Williams
2024	Chianti Classico	7	12–00	Tom Bellamy	Kim Bailey
2025	Henry's Friend	8	11–10	Ben Jones	Ben Pauling
2026	Viroflay	9	11-07	Lucas Murphy	Paul Nicholls

== See also ==
- Horse racing in Great Britain
- List of British National Hunt races
