= 2008 Grand National =

161st Grand National horse race

- Grand National
- Location: Aintree Racecourse
- Date: 5 April 2008
- Winning horse: (United Kingdom) Comply or Die
- Starting price: 7/1 JF
- Jockey: Timmy Murphy
- Trainer: David Pipe
- Owner: David Johnson
- Conditions: Good

External videos
- Replay of the 2008 Grand National in full Racing TV, YouTube

The 2008 Grand National (officially known as the John Smith's Grand National for sponsorship reasons) was the 161st official annual running of the Grand National steeplechase which took place at Aintree Racecourse near Liverpool, England, on 5 April 2008 and attracted the maximum permitted field of 40 runners, competing for total prize money of £450,640.

Joint-favourite Comply or Die and Irish jockey Timmy Murphy won the race (it was Murphy's eleventh attempt at the National), four lengths ahead of King John's Castle in second place and Snowy Morning in third.

== Competitors and betting ==
Cloudy Lane, ridden by Jason Maguire, was the long-time ante-post favourite but was joined just before the off by Comply or Die, ridden by Timmy Murphy; the pair sent off as 7–1 joint-favourites. The top weight of 11 stone and 12 lbs was carried by former winner Hedgehunter, ridden by Ruby Walsh. The full order of betting at the off was as follows:

SP	Number	Horse	Age	Handicap (st-lb)	Jockey	Trainer	Owner	Colours	Finishing position
7/1	26	Cloudy Lane	8	10–11	Jason Maguire	Donald McCain, Jr.	Trevor Hemmings	Green/yellow quarters, white sleeves and cap	6th
7/1	33	Comply or Die	9	10–9	Timmy Murphy	David Pipe	David Johnson	Blue with green sleeves, white cap with green spots	1st
10/1	11	Butler's Cabin	8	11–3	Tony McCoy	Jonjo O'Neill	J. P. McManus	Green and orange hoops, white cap	Fence 22
10/1	1	Hedgehunter	12	11–12	Ruby Walsh	Willie Mullins	Trevor Hemmings	Green/yellow quarters with white sleeves and green cap	13th
10/1	12	Slim Pickings	9	11–3	Barry Geraghty	Tom Taaffe	syndicate	Blue/whites checks, blue sleeves and cap	4th
11/1	7	Simon	9	11–7	Dominic Elsworth	John Spearing	Mercy Rimell	Purple with sky blue spots, sky blue and purple spotted cap	Fence 25
12/1	17	Bewley's Berry	10	11–0	Denis O'Regan	J. Howard Johnson	Andrea & Graham Wylie	Chocolate and brown halves, brown sleeves with chocolate hoops, chocolate cap	5th
14/1	13	Chelsea Harbour	8	11–12	Davy Russell	Thomas Mullins	Mrs. P. Duffin	Orange with black star, diablo sleeves, black and white hooped cap	9th
16/1	16	Snowy Morning	8	11–1	David Casey	Willie Mullins	Quayside syndicate	Yellow with black braces, quartered cap	3rd
20/1	27	King John's Castle	9	10–11	Paul Carberry	Arthur Moore	J. P. McManus	Green and orange hoops and quartered cap	2nd
20/1	14	Vodka Bleu	9	11–2	Paul Moloney	David Pipe	David Johnson	Blue with green sleeves, blue cap	Fence 19
25/1	22	D'Argent	11	10–12	Robert Thornton	Alan King	Nigel Bunter	Purple with navy star and cap	Fence 27
25/1	39	Philson Run	12	10–8	Daryl Jacob	Nick Williams	Gale Force One	Yellow with orange braces and grey lower sleeves, yellow cap with orange stars	Fence 8
25/1	19	McKelvey	9	11–0	Tom O'Brien	Peter Bowen	N. Elliott	Green with red V and quartered cap	Fence 20
25/1	4	Mr. Pointment	9	11–11	Sam Thomas	Paul Nicholls	Stockton Heath Racing	Red with blue double braces and lower sleeves, red cap	Fence 30
25/1	21	Point Barrow	10	10–13	Tony Dobbin	P. Hughes	Mrs. P. Clune Hughes, Mrs. M. O'Dwyer & J. Foley	Violet with purple trim and quartered cap	Fence 17
28/1	28	Mon Mome	8	10–11	Aidan Coleman	Venetia Williams	Vida Bingham	Green with blue armbands, green cap	10th
33/1	40	Dun Doire	9	10–7	Richard McGrath	Tony Martin	Dunderry Racing Syndicate	Green and navy hoops, navy sleeves, navy and white quartered cap	Fence 29
33/1	15	L'ami	9	11–1	Mick Fitzgerald	François Doumen	J. P. McManus	Green and orange hoops, red cap	Fence 2
33/1	5	Turko	6	11–10	Richard Johnson	Paul Nicholls	Stewart family	White and black halves with red sleeves and cap	Fence 25
50/1	9	Iron Man	7	11–5	Christian Williams	Peter Bowen	R. Owen & P. Fullager	White with red V, green and red striped sleeves, red cap	Fence 3
66/1	24	Bailey Breeze	9	10–11	Paddy Flood	Mouse Morris	R. A. Scott	Green with red star, stars on sleeves and cap	8th
66/1	38	Black Apalachi	9	10–8	Andrew McNamara	Dessie Hughes	Gerard Burke	Green with blue hoops on sleeves and star on cap	Fence 2
66/1	10	Fundamentalist	10	11–4	Paddy Brennan	Nigel Twiston-Davies	C. Cornes	Black with orange stripes, starson sleeves and orange cap	Fence 4
66/1	34	Idle Talk	9	10–9	Brian Harding	Donald McCain Jr.	Trevor Hemmings	Green and yellow quarters, white sleeves, red cap	14th
66/1	20	Joacci	8	10–13	Johnny Farrelly	David Pipe	David Johnson	Blue, green sleeves, white cap with green spots	Fence 20
66/1	35	Kelami	10	10–9	Barry Keniry	François Doumen	Halewood International Ltd.	Black with red and white striped sleeves and hooped cap	Fence 11
66/1	3	Knowhere	10	11–11	Joe Tizzard	Nigel Twiston-Davies	H. R. Mould	Green with white stars and star on cap	Fence 25
66/1	6	Madison Du Berlais	7	11–9	Tom Scudamore	David Pipe	Roger Stanley & Yvonne Reynolds II	Blue with white diamond belt and sleeves with red armbands and cap	Fence 8
66/1	30	Naunton Brook	9	10–10	Andrew Tinkler	Nigel Twiston-Davies	David Langdon	Navy and green stripes, red cap with navy star	Fence 19
80/1	29	Cornish Sett	9	10–10	Nick Scholfield	Paul Nicholls	Peter Hart	Green with white hoop, checkered sleeves and quartered cap	12th
100/1	8 (41)	Ardaghey	9	10–7	David England	Nigel Twiston-Davies	D. J. & S. A. Goodman	Green with white star, diablo sleeves and white star on cap	Fence 4
100/1	32	Backbeat	11	10–9	Wilson Renwick	J Howard Johnson	Andrea & Graham Wylie	Chocolate and brown halves, brown sleeves with chocolate hoops, red cap	Fence 2
100/1	25	Bob Hall	7	10–11	Noel Fehily	Jonjo O'Neill	J. P. McManus	Green and orange hoops, blue cap	Fence 19
100/1	18	Contraband	10	11–0	Keith Mercer	Paul Murphy	F. G. Wilson	Red, with white star, red and black striped sleeves, white cap with black star	Fence 11
100/1	2	Hi Cloy	11	11–12	Tom Doyle	Michael Hourigan	Susan McCloy	White with red belt and striped sleeves, white cap	11th
100/1	31	Tumbling Dice	9	10–10	Tom Ryan	Tom Taaffe	John Donegan	Black with red hollow square and checkered cap	Fence 3
125/1	36	Milan Deux Mille	6	10–9	Tom Malone	David Pipe	F. G. & J. E. Wilson	Orange with white cap, black striped sleeves, white cap with black star	15th
125/1	37	Nadover	7	10–9	Robbie Power	Charlie Mann	G. H. Storey	Sky blue with yellow belt	7th
125/1	23	No Full	7	10–12	Shay Barry	Eion Doyle	Mrs. P. Doyle	Green with white sash and diamond piping on sleeves, striped cap	Fence 6

Three riders were having their thirteenth ride in the race: Mick Fitzgerald, who won the race in 1996 on Rough Quest, Paul Carberry, who won the race in 1999 on Bobbyjo, and Tony McCoy. Other former winning riders competing were Ruby Walsh (Hedgehunter in 2005 and Papillon in 2000), Barry Geraghty (Monty's Pass in 2003), Tony Dobbin (Lord Gyllene in 1997) and Robbie Power (Silver Birch in 2007).

Ardaghey was listed as first reserve and was called into the race when Opera Mundi was withdrawn the day before.

== The race ==
The runners were sent away to a clean first start with No Full leading over the first fence, which all 40 runners cleared safely. The fences leading up to the sixth, Becher's Brook, claimed seven runners as Black Apalachi fell having taken the lead at the second; L'Ami, whose rider Mick Fitzgerald had to go to hospital with neck and back injuries, and Backbeat also fell. Tumbling Dice and Iron Man both unseated their riders when taking off too soon at the third, while Ardaghey and Fundamentalist got in too close to the fourth fence and both fell, leaving 31 runners continuing to Becher's, led by Mr. Pointment and Milan Deux Mille.

No Full was up in the leading dozen runners when he clipped the top of Becher's and fell, and the casualties increased at the Canal Turn where Madison Du Berlais fell and hampered Philson Run, whose rider was unseated. The 11th fence claimed two more fallers when Contraband and Kelami both failed to negotiate that obstacle, leaving 26 to complete the first circuit.

The water jump (16th fence) marked the end of the first circuit and was taken with Chelsea Harbour having moved up to lead from Mr. Pointment, D'Argent, Simon and Comply Or Die next in a tightly-packed field, which was reduced by one when Point Barrow was pulled up. Five other runners all left the contest before reaching Becher's Brook for the second time; Voldka Bleu, Naunton Brook and Bob Hall were all pulled up before the 19th; Joacci fell at the next and McKelvey also unseated his rider. McKelvey then veered sharply off the course after falling when trying to negotiate the running rails and suffering fatal injuries.

At Becher's Brook for the second time the first dozen remained tightly grouped consisting of Chelsea Harbour, Mr. Pointment, Comply or Die, D'Argent, Butler's Cabin, Snowy Morning, Idle Talk, Bewley's Berry, Knowhere, Simon, Mon Mome and Hedgehunter; Butler's Cabin fell there.

Knowhere and Simon were beginning to lose touch when unseated at Valentine's Brook, where Turko also fell. Joint-favourite Cloudy Lane had never been in the front rank and now looked too far off the pace to mount a challenge, as did Nadover, Bailey Breeze and Hi Cloy, with Cornish Sett and Milan Deux Mille tailed off with five fences to jump.

D'Argent also looked like he was just starting to drop away when he fell four fences from home. Comply or Die took the final fence the best and was never headed on the long run-in, winning by four lengths from King John's Castle and Snowy Morning; Slim Pickings was again fourth. Eleven others finished in the following order: Bewley's Berry, Cloudy Lane, Nadover, Baily Breeze, Chelsea Harbour, Mon Mome, Hi Cloy, Cornish Sett, Hedgehunter, Idle Talk and Milan Deux Mille. Dun Doire was pulled up before jumping the second-last fence and long-time leader Mr. Pointment pulled up before the last.

== Aftermath ==
It was the first Grand National win for all of the connections with Comply or Die, with jockey Timmy Murphy telling reporters that the race was the highlight of his career, confessing that the trainer had said the horse was a certainty to win. Owner David Johnson was also delighted to win after having had around 20 horses compete unsuccessfully in previous Nationals.

All of the other jockeys to complete the course returned stating their happiness with their mounts and such was the competitive nature of the race that all had felt they still had a chance at Becher's on the second circuit, the only exception being Tom Malone, whose Milan Deux Mille was already tailed off at that stage and finished a long way behind the rest.

2008 was Tony Dobbin's final ride in the Grand National, having announced his retirement before the race.

As a result of spinal injuries suffered in the race, Mick Fitzgerald also announced his retirement from race riding later that year.

== Media coverage ==
Murphy looks over his right shoulder and sees King John's Castle coming at him hard. They race towards the elbow. It's Comply or Die in front. Snowy Morning is coming again, King John's Castle the outside. Comply or Die, punched out by Murphy, leads by three or four lengths, and is going to go on and win the Grand National! It's Comply or Die, Timmy Murphy who wins the Grand National.

— Commentator Jim McGrath describes the climax of the 2008 Grand National

The National was televised live in the United Kingdom in a four-hour-long broadcast on BBC One, presented by Clare Balding with Rishi Persad and guest presenter Richard Dunwoody. The commentary team of four commentators was Ian Bartlett, Tony O'Hehir, Darren Owen and lead commentator Jim McGrath who called the winner home for the eleventh consecutive year.

The action was broadcast via fifty-two cameras, including cameras situated inside fences, although the use of jockey cams, cameras placed inside riders helmets was not used this year. The famous head-on elevated shot of Becher's Brook, which became synonymous with the fence for almost 50 years was replaced with a low angle shot. This was the 49th annual broadcast of the race live by the BBC.

== Jockeys ==
For the second consecutive year, Tony McCoy, Mick Fitzgerald and Paul Carberry weighed out as the most experienced riders in the race, each taking their thirteenth attempt at a Grand National. Both Fitzgerald (1996) and Carberry (1999) had previously won the race but McCoy joined Jeff King, Peter Scudamore and David Nicholson in having faced the starter thirteen times in the National without ever being winner or runner-up, although in Scudamore's case this included the void race of 1993. It proved to be the final race that Fitzgerald rode in as he suffered serious neck, back and knee ligament injuries from his fall from L'Ami at the second fence. It forced him to retire from race riding.

Eight riders made their debut in the race with Paddy Flood, Aidan Coleman and Nick Scholfield all completing the course while Wilson Renwick fell at the second fence.
