= Comply or Die =

Irish-bred Thoroughbred racehorse

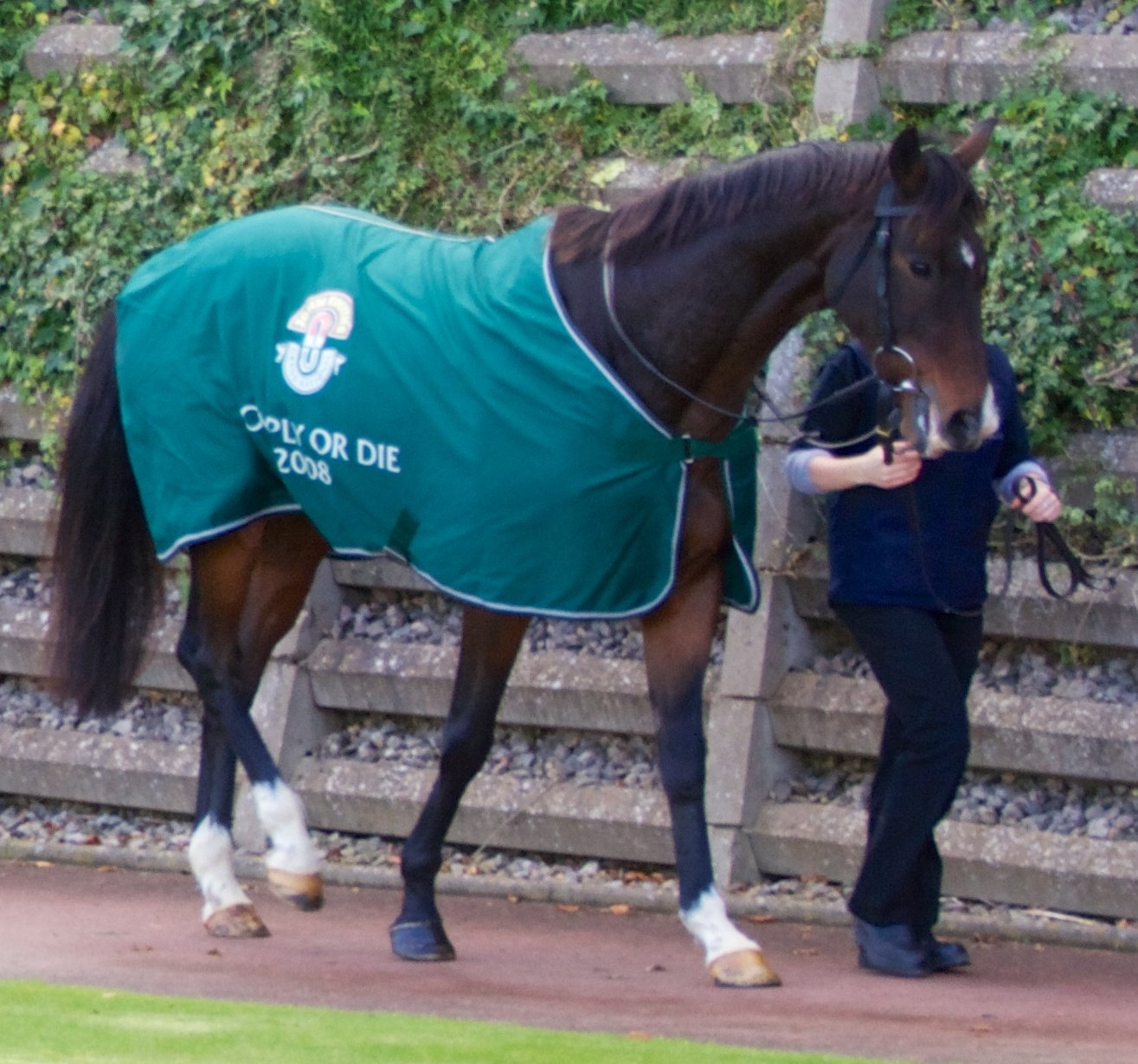
- Sire: Old Vic
- Grandsire: Sadler's Wells
- Dam: Madam Madcap
- Damsire: Furry Glen
- Sex: Gelding
- Foaled: 1999
- Country: Ireland
- Colour: Bay
- Breeder: Martin J. Dibbs
- Owner: David Johnson
- Trainer: David Pipe
- Record: 20-8-4-0
- Earnings: £606,640

Major wins
- Bristol Novices' Hurdle (2003); Rising Stars Novices' Chase (2004); Eider Chase (2008); Grand National (2008)
- Last updated on 5 April 2009

Comply or Die (1999–2016) was a British-trained Thoroughbred racehorse, owned by David Johnson. Ridden by Timmy Murphy and trained by David Pipe he was the winner of the 2008 John Smith's Grand National at Aintree Racecourse, run on Saturday 5 April 2008. He pushed ahead at the last fence to win from the grey King John's Castle.

Bookmakers William Hill conceded that his victory cost the chain 7 million GBP.

In the John Smith's Grand National on 4 April 2009, Comply Or Die finished 2nd place at odds of 14–1. He carried approximately one extra stone of weight than in his previous Grand National and lost to Mon Mome.

Comply Or Die participated in two additional Grand Nationals in the coming two years. He finished 12th in 2010 and was pulled up before the third-last fence in 2011. After that, Comply Or Die was immediately retired.

Comply or Die was cremated on Monday 9 May 2016 after having died over the weekend. David Pipe stated that Comply or Die had been involved in dressage events since his retirement, and was "greatly saddened to hear of his loss".
