= Grand Sefton Handicap Chase =

Steeplechase horse race in Britain

Grand Sefton Handicap Chase
2025
Colonel Harry	Gaboriot	Excello

Previous years
2024
King Turgeon	Vintage Fizz	Gaboriot
2023
Gesskille	Percussion	Frero Banbou
2022
Al Dancer	Gesskille	Percussion
2021
Mac Tottie	Senior Citizen	Manwell

2020-2011
2020
Beau Bay	Sir Jack Yeats	Modus
2019
Hogan's Height	Wishfull Dreaming	Beau Bay
2018
Warriors Tale	Brandon Hill	Kilcrea Vale
2017
Gas Line Boy	Ultragold	Sametegal
2016
As De Mee	Seefood	Henryville
2015
Bennys Mist	Seventh Sky	Distime
2014
Poole Master	Cedre Bleu	Bennys Mist
2013
Rebel Rebellion	Your Busy	You Must Know Me
2012
Little Josh	Gansey	Tranquil Sea
2011
Stewarts House	Linnel	Buffalo Bob

2010-2003
2010
Frankie Figg	Nikola	Private Be
2009
Dev	Pak Jack	Craiglands
2008
Endless Power	Brooklyn Brownie	Iron Man
2007
Lampion Du Bost	Jimmy Bond	Bannister Lane
2006
I Hear Thunder	Shannon's Pride	Theatre Knight
2005
Hakim	Fiori	Shannon's Pride
2004
Forest Gunner	Asparagus	Flinders Chase
2003
Dark Room	Scotmail Boy	Whereareyounow

The Grand Sefton Handicap Chase is a National Hunt steeplechase in Great Britain which is open to horses aged six years or older. It is run at Aintree over a distance of about 2 miles and 5 furlongs (2 miles 5 furlongs and 19 yards, or 4,242 metres), and during its running there are eighteen fences to be jumped. The race is scheduled to take place in December.

It was first run over a one hundred-year period from 1865 to 1965 as part of Aintree's autumn meeting and was run over a distance of just under three miles. Originally, the Grand Sefton was one of the most important events of the autumn, but after the Second World War its popularity waned as Aintree's fortunes foundered. In 2003, the race was revived and run on the first day of the November Becher Meeting and run over the same fences as Aintree's most famous race, the Grand National. Prior to 2021 the race was run at Aintree's meeting on the first Saturday in December, but was moved to early November; it returned to the early-December slot in 2026.

== Winners since 2003 ==
Year	Winner	Age	Weight	Jockey	Trainer	Owner
2003	Dark Room	6	10-06	Liam Cooper	Jonjo O'Neill	J. P. McManus
2004	Forest Gunner	10	11-07	Peter Buchanan	Richard Ford	Mr John Gilsenan
2005	Hakim	11	10-12	Paddy Brennan	John Spearing	Mr T N Siviter
2006	I Hear Thunder	8	11-05	Daryl Jacob	Bob Buckler	Mr Nick Elliott
2007	Lampion Du Bost	8	10-00	Phil Kinsella	Jim Goldie	The Dodoz Partnership
2008	Endless Power	8	10-03	James Reveley	Jim Goldie	Fyffees
2009	Dev	9	10-07	Jamie Moore	Michael Quinlan	Mr Liam Mulryan
2010	Frankie Figg	8	11-05	Brian Hughes	Howard Johnson	Andrea & Graham Wylie
2011	Stewarts House	9	11-08	Aidan Coleman	Tim Vaughan	Double Trouble Partnership
2012	Little Josh	10	10-09	Sam Twiston-Davies	Nigel Twiston-Davies	Mr Tony Bloom
2013	Rebel Rebellion	8	11-11	Ryan Mahon	Paul Nicholls	Mr & Mrs M Woodhouse
2014	Poole Master	9	10-12	Tom Scudamore	David Pipe	G Thompson
2015	Bennys Mist	9	10-04	Liam Treadwell	Venetia Williams	Mezzone Family
2016	As De Mee	6	11-00	Sean Bowen	Paul Nicholls	Stewart Family / Judi Dench
2017	Gas Line Boy	11	11-10	Robert Dunne	Ian Williams	The Three Graces
2018	Warriors Tale	9	11-12	Sean Bowen	Paul Nicholls	Trevor Hemmings
2019	Hogan's Height	8	10-08	Tom Cannon	Jamie Snowden	Foxtrot Racing
2020	Beau Bay	9	10-02	Charlie Hammond	Richard Newland	Peter Green / Richard Newland
2021	Mac Tottie	8	11-01	James Bowen	Peter Bowen	Steve & Jackie Fleetham
2022	Al Dancer	9	10-13	Charlie Deutsch	Sam Thomas	Walters Plant Hire Ltd
2023	Gesskille	7	11-07	Henry Brooke	Oliver Greenall & Josh Guerriero	The Nevers Racing Partnership
2024	King Turgeon	6	10-02	Jack Tudor	David Pipe	Somerset Racing
2025	Colonel Harry	8	11-12	Gavin Sheehan	Jamie Snowden	The GD Partnership

== See also ==
- Horse racing in Great Britain
- List of British National Hunt races
