= Teeton Mill =

British-bred Thoroughbred racehorse

- Sire: Neltino
- Grandsire: Bustino
- Dam: Celtic Well
- Damsire: Celtic Cone
- Sex: Gelding
- Foaled: 19 May 1989
- Country: United Kingdom
- Colour: Grey
- Breeder: Mrs K I Hayward
- Owner: C R Saunders; The Winning Line
- Trainer: Caroline Bailey; Venetia Williams
- Record: 11: 9-1-0
- Earnings: £191,604

Major wins
- Badger Beer Chase (1998); Hennessy Gold Cup (1998); King George VI Chase (1998); Ascot Chase (1999)

Teeton Mill (19 May 1989 – November 2014) was a British Thoroughbred racehorse who competed under National Hunt rules. He originally competed in hunter chases, which are confined to horses who have taken part in fox hunting, and won five of his first six races. When moved into open competition he won four consecutive races including the Badger Beer Chase, Hennessy Gold Cup, King George VI Chase and the Ascot Chase before sustaining a career-ending injury in the 1999 Cheltenham Gold Cup.

== Background ==
Teeton Mill was a grey gelding bred in the United Kingdom by Mrs K I Hayward. He was sired by Neltino who won one of his five races before his racing career was ended by injury as a three-year-old in 1981. He became a successful National Hunt stallion whose other offspring included Flying Instructor (winner of fourteen races including the Red Rum Chase) and Mandy's Mantino (seven races including the Sport of Kings Challenge). Teeton Mill's dam Celtic Well was an unraced daughter of the broodmare Rydewell who also produced the Christmas Hurdle winner Ryde Again. Rydewell was a distant descendant of Ayrshire Beauty, a half-sister of The Derby winner Volodyovski. Teeton Mill was first sent into training with Caroline Bailey and was owned during his racing career by The Winning Line.

== Racing career ==
=== 1997/1998 National Hunt season ===
Teeton Mill made his first appearance under National Hunt rules as an eight-year-old in February 1997, when he won a hunter chase over two and a half miles at Leicester Racecourse, beating thirteen opponents at odds of 11/10. When the next hunter chase season began in early 1998 he won by more than thirty lengths at Wetherby Racecourse in February before following up in March with victories at Leicester and Newbury in March. The gelding was then moved to the stable of Venetia Williams in Herefordshire. Having been ridden in his first four races by the amateur Ben Pollock, Teeton Mill was partnered by Seamus Durack when the gelding contested a hunter chase at Cheltenham Racecourse in April 1998. He started the 4/5 favourite but after taking the lead at the third last fence and weakened to finish second, beaten twelve lengths by Double Thriller. A month later Teeton Mill was ridden by Shirley Vickery when he contested the Horse & Hound Cup Champion Hunter Chase over three and a half miles at Stratford Racecourse. He started the 5/1 third choice behind the Scottish hunter Jigtime (winner of all seven of his completed races) and the mare Grimley Gale whilst the other runners included Double Silk, a winner of eighteen hunter chases including two editions of the CGA Foxhunter Chase at the Cheltenham Festival. Teeton Mill took the lead at the eleventh fence and went clear at the final fence to win by seven lengths from Grimley Gale with a gap of more than thirty lengths back to Jigtime. Double Silk was the only one of the six other runners to complete the course.

=== 1998/1999 National Hunt season ===
In the 1998/1999 season, Teeton Mill moved out of hunter chases to compete against professional opposition and was ridden in all of his five races by Norman Williamson. On his seasonal debut, he carried 158 pounds in the Badger Beer Handicap Chase over three and a quarter miles at Wincanton Racecourse on 7 November and won by eight lengths from Menesonic. Three weeks later, Teeton Mill was one of sixteen horses to contest the forty-second running of the Hennessy Gold Cup at Newbury. Carrying 145 pounds, he started the 5/1 second favourite behind the Midlands Grand National winner Seven Towers, with the other runners including Addington Boy (Tripleprint Gold Cup), Call It A Day (Whitbread Gold Cup), Coome Hill (winner of the race in 1996), The Toiseach (Reynoldstown Novices' Chase), Fiddling The Facts (Feltham Novices' Chase) and Boss Doyle (Mildmay Novices' Chase). Williamson positioned the grey just behind the leaders before taking the lead three fences from the finish. He drew steadily clear of the field in the straight to win by fifteen lengths from Eudipe. On 26 December 1998 Teeton Mill was stepped up to Grade 1 level for the King George VI Chase over three miles at Kempton Park Racecourse in which he was matched against many of the leading steeplechasers of the time including Imperial Call, See More Business, Simply Dashing (FNB Gold Cup), Escartefigue (Martell Cup), Coome Hill, Challenger du Luc (Cathcart Challenge Cup, Murphy's Gold Cup) and Mulligan (Henry VIII Novices' Chase). Starting the 7/2 second favourite on soft ground, he raced just behind the leaders before taking the lead from Imperial Call at the fourteenth of the eighteen fences. He quickly went clear of the field and won by six lengths from Escartefigue with Imperial Call more than thirty lengths away in third and Challenger du Luc last of the four finishers.

In February, Teeton Mill was dropped back in distance for the Grade 1 Ascot Chase over two and a half miles in which he was pitted against the Tingle Creek Trophy winner Direct Route, the Mildmay of Flete winner Super Coin, the Murphy's Gold Cup and December Gold Cup winner Senor El Betrutti and Challenger du Luc. Teeton Mill took the lead at the sixth fence and drew clear of the field to establish a twelve length advantage at the second last fence. He was eased down in the closing stages to win by four lengths from Senor El Betrutti with the subsequently disqualified Challenger du Luc in third place. On 18 March 1999, Teeton Mill started the 7/2 second favourite behind the Irish gelding Florida Pearl for the 72nd Cheltenham Gold Cup in a field which included Dorans Pride, See More Business, Double Thriller, Addington Boy, Simply Dashing, Escartefigue, Suny Bay and Senor El Betrutti. Teeton Mill made several jumping errors before pulling up lame before the tenth fence and was later found to have dislodged a tendon on his hock.

== Retirement ==
Although Venetia William hoped to bring Teeton Mill back in the 1999/2000 season, the injuries sustained in the 1999 Gold Cup ended Teeton Mill's racing career. He served as a hack for his trainer for several years. Teeton Mill died in November 2014 at the age of twenty-five.

== Pedigree ==
Pedigree of Teeton Mill (GB), grey gelding, 1989
Sire Neltino (GB) 1978	Bustino (GB); 1971	Busted	Crepello
Sire Neltino (GB) 1978	Bustino (GB); 1971	Busted	Sans le Sou
Sire Neltino (GB) 1978	Bustino (GB); 1971	Ship Yard	Doutelle
Sire Neltino (GB) 1978	Bustino (GB); 1971	Ship Yard	Paving Stone
Sire Neltino (GB) 1978	Flying Nelly (IRE); 1970	Nelcius	Temareze
Sire Neltino (GB) 1978	Flying Nelly (IRE); 1970	Nelcius	Namagua
Sire Neltino (GB) 1978	Flying Nelly (IRE); 1970	Flying By	Bleep-Bleep
Sire Neltino (GB) 1978	Flying Nelly (IRE); 1970	Flying By	Japhette
Dam Celtic Well (GB) 1980	Celtic Cone (GB); 1967	Celtic Ash	Sicambre
Dam Celtic Well (GB) 1980	Celtic Cone (GB); 1967	Celtic Ash	Ash Plant
Dam Celtic Well (GB) 1980	Celtic Cone (GB); 1967	Fircone	Mossborough
Dam Celtic Well (GB) 1980	Celtic Cone (GB); 1967	Fircone	Wood Fire
Dam Celtic Well (GB) 1980	Rydewell (GB); 1964	Blast	Djebe
Dam Celtic Well (GB) 1980	Rydewell (GB); 1964	Blast	Gale Warning
Dam Celtic Well (GB) 1980	Rydewell (GB); 1964	Arceeno	Arciere
Dam Celtic Well (GB) 1980	Rydewell (GB); 1964	Arceeno	Avageeno (Family: 14-d)
