= David Johnson (racehorse owner) =

British thoroughbred racehorse owner

- Born: 21 September 1943; London, United Kingdom
- Died: 6 July 2013 (aged 69)
- Occupation: Businessman
- Known for: Racehorse Owner
- Spouse: Shirley Gerard (m. 1968)
- Children: 2

David Johnson (21 September 1943 – 6 July 2013) was a British businessman, known for owning National Hunt racehorses.

== Early life ==
Johnson was born in September 1943, and was brought up in Essex. He was a West Ham United fan. His father was a docker in London.

== Business ==
Johnson began his first role in banking as a clerk for Martins Bank in Lombard Street, where he initially earned £9 per week. He would go on to work for Cedar Holdings, and began to specialise in the specialist lending industry. He established his own finance house, J&J Securities, in the 1990s which was acquired multiple times before becoming iGroup. Johnson was Managing Director of iGroup when it was sold to GE Capital in 2001, with the business valued at £200million. He resigned the following year.

In 2003, Johnson set up Commercial First Mortgages, and lender Link Group in 2006. However, the 2008 financial crisis, Johnson's businesses declined rapidly. He was able to keep the business afloat, and in 2011 was able to secure funding from Royal Bank of Scotland to acquire Whiteaway Laidlaw from the Manchester Building Society, which was rebranded as Shawbrook Bank.

== Horse racing ==
Johnson formed a close relationship with the trainer, Martin Pipe, and from the early 1990's the pair enjoyed great success. AP McCoy, and later Timmy Murphy, were the primary jockeys to carry Johnson's silks - a mixture of blue, white and green. Johnson had over 100 horses at his peak of ownership. He enjoyed significant success, notably winning the 2008 Grand National with Comply or Die. Other notable horses owned by Johnson included Well Chief, Our Vic, Cyfor Malta, Classified and It Takes Time. Johnson was champion jumps owner six times.

After the 2008 financial crisis, Johnson scaled back his ownership restructuring but remaining with the Pipe stables. Following his death, horses continued to run in his colours under the name The Johnson Family.

== Personal life ==
In 1968, Johnson married Shirley Gerard and the pair had two children, Stephen and Lisa. Johnson died on 6 July 2013 of cancer.
