= Hear The Echo =

Irish National Hunt racehorse

- Sire: Luso
- Grandsire: Salse
- Dam: Echo Creek
- Damsire: Strong Gale
- Sex: Gelding
- Foaled: 2001
- Country: Ireland
- Colour: Bay
- Breeder: Nuala Delaney
- Owner: Gigginstown House Stud
- Trainer: Mouse Morris
- Record: 23: 4-1-1
- Earnings: £164,006

Major wins
- Paddy Fitzpatrick Memorial Novice Chase (2007); Irish Grand National (2008)
- Last updated on December 4, 2009

Hear The Echo (2001 – 4 April 2009) was an Irish-bred National Hunt racing horse trained by Mouse Morris and ridden by jockey Davy Russell.

In 23 starts, Hear The Echo won four races, finished second once and third once, with career earnings of £164,006; his best-known win was the 2008 Irish Grand National, a 12-length victory. On 4 April 2009, Hear The Echo collapsed near the finish of the Grand National and later died.

== See also ==
- List of equine fatalities in the Grand National
