= Liam Treadwell =

English jockey (1986–2020)

Personal information
- Born: 3 January 1986 Arundel, West Sussex, England
- Died: 23 June 2020 (aged 34) Billingsley, Shropshire, England
- Occupation: National Hunt jockey

Horse racing career
- Sport: Horse racing
- Career wins: 308

Significant horses
- Mon Mome

Liam Treadwell (3 January 1986 – 23 June 2020) was an English National Hunt jockey, who won over 300 races between 2009 and 2019. He won the 2009 Grand National on Mon Mome at odds of 100/1, and also won the United House Gold Cup, Byrne Group Plate and Grand Sefton Steeplechase races.

== Personal life ==
Treadwell was born in Arundel, West Sussex, England. He attended the local Angmering School. He was nicknamed "Tredders".

== Career ==
Treadwell worked alongside trainer Venetia Williams. He was the winner of the 2009 Grand National, having ridden Mon Mome to victory at odds of 100/1. It was only the fifth time a horse at those odds won the race, the most recent being Foinavon in 1967. It was Treadwell's debut in the Grand National, in his first season in jump racing. After his Grand National victory on 4 April 2009, Clare Balding interviewed him and made fun of his apparently bad teeth. Both the BBC and Balding apologised by 6 April. Balding later said on BBC's Have I Got News for You quiz that she believed Treadwell to have had his teeth "kicked out" by a horse, a common injury suffered by jockeys, apologising again for her error. The BBC received over 2,000 complaints about Balding's remarks. Treadwell later received calls from dentists offering to fix his teeth for free. Later in 2009, Treadwell caused another upset by winning the United House Gold Cup at Ascot on The Last Derby at odds of 33/1.

In 2013, Treadwell won the Byrne Group Plate race at the Cheltenham Festival on Carrickboy. He was taken to hospital after falling in the Topham Chase. In the 2013–14 season, Treadwell had 42 winners, the most he achieved in a racing season. Treadwell was a standby rider for the 2014 Grand National. In 2015, he came third at the Grand National riding Monbeg Dude, and won the Grand Sefton Steeplechase on Bennys Mist. In 2016, he sustained a head injury after falling at Bangor. He was unable to race for six months. His injury was featured in a Professional Jockeys Association film about the dangers of concussion in horse racing.

Treadwell announced his retirement on 13 February 2018, citing health reasons, including his head injury and a shoulder injury. He had 298 winners at the time. In March 2019, he resumed racing, working with trainer Alastair Ralph. In his first race back, he rode Czech Her Out, who narrowly lost out to Miss Honey Ryder. He rode ten winners in the 2019–20 season, and worked as an assistant trainer for Ralph.

In total, Treadwell won 308 National Hunt races, and 28 flat races.

== Death ==
Treadwell died on 23 June 2020, aged 34, in Billingsley, Shropshire, after taking a mixture of drugs including an animal painkiller and class A substances. At an inquest in February 2021 a coroner recorded a verdict of misadventure.

== See also ==
- List of jockeys
