= Killiney Novice Chase =

Horse race in Ireland

Killiney Novice Chase
2026
| Kappa Jy Pyke | Jacob's Ladder | Predators Gold |

Previous years
2025
Lecky Watson | Down Memory Lane | Farren Glory
2024
Spillane's Tower | Blood Destiny | Silent Approach
2023
Impervious | Journey With Me | Minella Crooner
2022
Bob Olinger | Capodanno | Gaillard Du Mesnil
2021
Envoi Allen | Fils D'oudairies | Dinny Lacey

2020-2011
2020
Carefully Selected | City Island | Dallas Des Pictons
2019
Winter Escape | A Plus Tard | Jetz
2018
Invitation Only | Koshari | The Storyteller
2017
Yorkhill | Jett | Gangster
2016
Killultagh Vic | Blair Perrone | Lord Scoundrel
2015
Vautour | Aladdins Cave | Only two finished
2014
Djakadam | Bright New Dawn | Mullaghanoe River
2013
Texas Jack | Lord Windermere | Marito
2012
Sir Des Champs | Fists Of Fury | Hidden Cyclone
2011
Magnanimity | Jessies Dream | Elysian Rock

2010-2001
2010
Roberto Goldback | Apt Approach | Jessies Dream
2009
Merchent Paddy | Bohemian Lass | Beroni
2008
Glencove Marina | Finger Onthe Pulse | Charlie Yardbird
2007
Hear The Echo | Justpourit | Mac Three
2006
Nickname | Father Matt | Romaha
2005
Newmill | Strong Project | Keepatem
2004
Emotional Moment | Stashedaway | BallyAmber
2003
Ten Poundsworth | Ground Ball | Be My Belle
2002
Silver Steel | Regal Venture | Ellenjay
2001
Ross Moff | Idiot's Star | Buck's Venture

2000-1995
2000
To Your Honour | Sallie's Girl | Feathered Leader
1999
Native Estates | Inis Cara | Sarsfield The Man
1998
Glebe Lad | Private Peace | Bavard Jet
1997
Ultra Flutter | Miracle Man | The Carrig Rua
1996
Treble Bob | Minella Lad | Topical Tip
1995
Frank Be Lucky | Topical Tip | Athy Spirit

The Killiney Novice Chase is a Grade 3 National Hunt chase in Ireland. It is currently run at Punchestown Racecourse in early January, over a distance of about 2 miles and 3½ furlongs (2 miles, 3 furlongs and 146 yards).

The race was run at Leopardstown Racecourse over a distance of 2 miles and 3 furlongs from its first running in 1995 to 2017. The race changed venues in 2018 due to the creation of the Leopardstown Dublin Festival. This new meeting "combines the feature races from Leopardstown's current three stand-alone meetings in late January and mid-February".

Prior to 2010, the race was titled the Paddy Fitzpatrick Memorial Novice Chase. In 2010, it was called the MCR Chase, in 2011, it was called Tote Pick Six Killiney Novice Chase and in 2012 and 2013, the race was sponsored by Boylesports and run as the Boylesports.com Bet On Your Mobile Novice Chase. Boylesports continued to sponsor the race in 2013 when the title reverted to the Killiney Novice Chase. From 2016, it was sponsored by the Ladbrokes Coral bookmaking group. It was downgraded from Grade 2 to Grade 3 in 2017. The race was sponsored by Total Event Rental for the 2018 and 2019 runnings. There was no race sponsor in 2020. The 2024 running is sponsored by Sky Bet.

== Records ==
Most successful jockey (5 wins):

- Davy Russell - Ten Poundsworth (2003), Hear The Echo (2007), Merchent Paddy (2009), Magnanimity (2011), Sir Des Champs (2012)

Most successful trainer (10 wins):

- Willie Mullins – Glencove Marina (2008), Sir Des Champs (2012), Djakadam (2014), Vautour (2015), Killultagh Vic (2016), Yorkhill (2017), Invitation Only (2018), Carefully Selected (2020), Lecky Watson (2025), Kappa Jy Pyke (2026)

== Winners ==
| Year | Winner | Age | Jockey | Trainer |
|---|---|---|---|---|
| 1995 | Frank Be Lucky | 9 | Frank Woods | Jim Dreaper |
| 1996 | Treble Bob | 6 | Richard Dunwoody | Dermot Weld |
| 1997 | Ultra Flutter | 10 | Tony McCoy | Michael Hourigan |
| 1998 | Glebe Lad | 6 | Tom Rudd | Michael O'Brien |
| 1999 | Native Estates | 7 | Paul Carberry | Noel Meade |
| 2000 | To Your Honour | 7 | David Casey | Francis Flood |
| 2001 | Ross Moff | 8 | Conor O'Dwyer | Tony Martin |
| 2002 | Silver Steel | 7 | Alan Crowe (Note: amateur jockey) | Christy Roche |
| 2003 | Ten Poundsworth | 10 | Davy Russell | G Stewart |
| 2004 | Emotional Moment | 7 | Barry Geraghty | Tom Taaffe |
| 2005 | Newmill | 7 | Barry Geraghty | Thomas Gerard O'Leary |
| 2006 | Nickname | 7 | Conor O'Dwyer | Martin Brassil |
| 2007 | Hear The Echo | 6 | Davy Russell | Mouse Morris |
| 2008 | Glencove Marina | 6 | Ruby Walsh | Willie Mullins |
| 2009 | Merchent Paddy | 8 | Davy Russell | Charles Byrnes |
| 2010 | Roberto Goldback | 8 | Robbie Power | Jessica Harrington |
| 2011 | Magnanimity | 7 | Davy Russell | Dessie Hughes |
| 2012 | Sir Des Champs | 6 | Davy Russell | Willie Mullins |
| 2013 | Texas Jack | 7 | Paul Carberry | Noel Meade |
| 2014 | Djakadam | 5 | Paul Townend | Willie Mullins |
| 2015 | Vautour | 6 | Ruby Walsh | Willie Mullins |
| 2016 | Killultagh Vic | 7 | Ruby Walsh | Willie Mullins |
| 2017 | Yorkhill | 7 | Ruby Walsh | Willie Mullins |
| 2018 | Invitation Only | 7 | David Mullins | Willie Mullins |
| 2019 | Winter Escape | 8 | Mark Walsh | Aidan Howard |
| 2020 | Carefully Selected | 8 | Paul Townend | Willie Mullins |
| 2021 | Envoi Allen | 7 | Jack Kennedy | Gordon Elliott |
| 2022 | Bob Olinger | 7 | Rachael Blackmore | Henry de Bromhead |
| 2023 | Impervious | 7 | Brian Hayes | Colm Murphy |
| 2024 | Spillane's Tower | 6 | Mark Walsh | James Joseph Mangan |
| 2025 | Lecky Watson | 7 | Paul Townend | Willie Mullins |
| 2026 | Kappa Jy Pyke | 6 | Danny Mullins | Willie Mullins |

== See also ==
- Horse racing in Ireland
- List of Irish National Hunt races
