= Sun Racing Plate Handicap Chase =

Steeplechase horse race in Britain

TrustATrader Plate Handicap Chase
- Class: Premier Handicap
- Location: Cheltenham Racecourse; Cheltenham, England
- Race type: Steeplechase
- Sponsor: TrustATrader
- Website: Cheltenham

Race information
- Distance: 2m 4f 127y (4,139 metres)
- Surface: Turf
- Track: Left-handed
- Qualification: Five-years-old and up
- Weight: Handicap
- Purse: £120,000 (2023); 1st: £67,524

Mildmay of Flete Challenge Cup
2026
Madara	Will The Wise	Moon D'orange

Previous years
2025
Jagwar	Thecompanysergeant	Masaccio
2024
Shakem Up'arry	Crebilly	Straw Fan Jack
2023
Seddon	Fugitif	Shakem Up'arry
2022
Coole Cody	Imperial Alcazar	Spiritofthegames
2021
The Shunter	Farclas	Top Notch

2020-2011
2020
Simply The Betts	Happy Diva	Mister Whitaker
2019
Siruh Du Lac	Janika	Spiritofthegames
2018
The Storyteller	Splash of Ginge	King's Odyssey
2017
Road To Respect	Baron Alco	Bouvreuil
2016
Empire of Dirt	Tango De Juilley	Kings Palace
2015
Darna	Monetaire	Rawnaq
2014
Ballynagour	Colour Squadron	Tatenen
2013
Carrickboy	Vino Griego	Tartak
2012
Salut Flo	The Cockney Mackem	Glam Gerry
2011
Holmwood Legend	Aimigayle	Beautiful Sound

2010-2001
2010
Great Endeavour	Sunnyhillboy	From Dawn To Dusk
2009
Something Wells	Ping Pong Sivola	Notable D'Estruval
2008
Mister McGoldrick	Gwanako	Fundamentalist
2007
Idole First	Palarshan	Mariah Rollins
2006
Non So	Kelrev	Graphic Approach
2005
Liberthine	Banker Count	Simply Gifted
2004
Tikram	Iznogoud	Fondmort
2003
Young Spartacus	Fondmort	Scots Grey
2002
Blowing Wind	Lady Cricket	Its Time for a Win

2000-1991
2000
Dark Stranger	Native Charm	Inn at the Top
1999
Majadou	King of Sparta	Wayward King
1998
Super Coin	Sparky Gayle	Monnaie Forte
1997
Terao	All The Aces	Air Shot
1996
Old Bridge	Call It A Day	Postage Stamp
1995
Kadi	Dublin Flyer	Well Briefed
1994
Elfast	Dublin Flyer	Smartie Express
1993
Sacre D'Or	Smartie Express	Southern Minstrel
1992
Elfast	Sea Island	King Of The Lot
1991
Foyle Fisherman	Romany King	Gold Options

1990-1988
1990
New Halen	Lacidar	King Of The Lot
1989
Paddyboro	Aughavogue	Rambling Song
1988
Smart Tar	Bishops Yarn	Comeragh King

The TrustATrader Plate Handicap Chase is a Premier Handicap National Hunt steeplechase in Great Britain which is open to horses aged five years or older. It is run on the New Course at Cheltenham over a distance of about 2 miles and 4½ furlongs (2 miles 4 furlongs and 127 yards, or 4,139 metres), and during its running there are seventeen fences to be jumped. It is a handicap race, and is scheduled to take place each year during the Cheltenham Festival in March.

== History ==
The race was established in memory of the 2nd Baron Mildmay of Flete (1909–1950), an amateur National Hunt jockey who rode three winners at the Cheltenham Festival. The inaugural race took place in April 1951, because the planned running, in March, had to be abandoned, due to a waterlogged course. It was originally titled the Mildmay of Flete Handicap Chase.

The Racing Post sponsored the race from 2006 to 2008, and during this period it was titled the Racing Post Plate. The 2009 running was named the Freddie Williams Festival Plate, in tribute to Freddie Williams (1942–2008), a popular Scottish bookmaker who owned a pitch at Cheltenham. The construction company Byrne Group supported the event from 2010 to 2014 and from 2015 to 2020 it was sponsored by Brown Advisory and Merriebelle Stable. The bookmaking firm Paddy Power sponsored in 2021. The Craft Irish Whiskey Co. took over the sponsorship from 2022 and the 2023 race was sponsored by Magners. The race held Grade 3 status until 2022 and was reclassified as a Premier Handicap from the 2023 running when Grade 3 status was renamed by the British Horseracing Authority.

== Records ==
Most successful horse (2 wins):

- The Tsarevich – 1985, 1986
- Elfast – 1992, 1994

Leading jockey (3 wins):

- Fred Winter – Slender (1951, dead-heat), Sy Oui (1953), Caesar's Helm (1958)

Leading trainer (4 wins):

- Bobby Renton – Tudor Line (1954), Caesar's Helm (1958), Siracusa (1959), Merry Court (1968)
- Nicky Henderson – The Tsarevich (1985, 1986), Liberthine (2005), Non So (2006)
- Martin Pipe – Terao (1997), Majadou (1999), Dark Stranger (2000), Blowing Wind (2002)

== Winners ==
- Weights given in stones and pounds.

Year	Winner	Age	Weight	Jockey	Trainer
1951	Canford (DH)	9	12-02	Glen Kelly	Ivor Anthony
1951	Slender (DH)	9	10–11	Fred Winter	Ryan Price
1952	Portarlington	7	10-08	Ken Mullins	Willie Stephenson
1953	Sy Oui	8	10-03	Fred Winter	Ryan Price
1954	Tudor Line	9	10–12	George Slack	Bobby Renton
1955	Mont Tremblant	9	12-07	Dave Dick	Fulke Walwyn
1956	Pondapatarri	7	11-00	René Emery	George Beeby
1957	Madras	7	10-02	Johnny Bullock	Michael Marsh
1958	Caesar's Helm	7	11-06	Fred Winter	Bobby Renton
1959	Siracusa	6	10–12	Jumbo Wilkinson	Bobby Renton
1960	Devon Customer	8	10-04	Joe Guest	Syd Bowler
1961	Malting Barley	6	10-04	Owen McNally	Toby Balding
1962	Spring Greeting	7	10–06	Johnny Lehane	Verly Bewicke
1963	Milo	8	10-04	Josh Gifford	Herbert Blagrave
1964	Take Plenty	8	10-01	Ron Vibert	Tim Forster
1965	Snaigow	6	10-03	Johnny Lehane	Verly Bewicke
1966	Tibidabo	6	10-04	Jeff King	Arthur Freeman
1967	French March	7	09-09	Ben Hanbury (Note: amateur jockey)	Tom Hanbury
1968	Merry Court	7	10-03	Josh Gifford	Bobby Renton
1969	Specify	7	11-02	Bob Davies	Denis Rayson
1970	Verona Forest	7	11-00	Gerry Scott	Neville Crump
1971	Hound Tor	7	10-02	Macer Gifford	Guy Harwood
1972	Mocharabuice	9	10-07	Graham Thorner	Tim Forster
1973	Vulgan Town	7	10-00	Johnny Haine	Toby Balding
1974	Garnishee	10	10–10	David Mould	Harry Thomson Jones
1975	Summerville	9	10–13	Andrew Turnell	Bob Turnell
1976	Broncho II	7	11-01	Michael Dickinson	Tony Dickinson
1977	Uncle Bing	8	12-05	John Francome	Richard Head
1978	King or Country	7	10-09	Paul Leach	David Barons
1979	Brawny Scot	9	10-00	Ridley Lamb	George Fairbairn
1980	Snowshill Sailor	8	10-04	Andrew Turnell	Bob Turnell
1981	Political Pop	7	10-00	Robert Earnshaw	Michael Dickinson
1982	Doubleuagain	8	10-00	Frank Berry	Andy Geraghty
1983	Mr Peapock	7	09-07	Leslie Bloomfield	Trevor Hallett
1984	Half Free	8	11-06	Richard Linley	Fred Winter
1985	The Tsarevich	9	11-07	John White	Nicky Henderson
1986	The Tsarevich	10	11-05	John White	Nicky Henderson
1987	Gee-A	8	09–10	Gee Armytage	Geoff Hubbard
1988	Smart Tar	7	10-02	Carl Llewellyn	Mark Wilkinson
1989	Paddyboro	11	10-07	Richard Rowe	Josh Gifford
1990	New Halen	9	09-07	Eamon Tierney	Paul James
1991	Foyle Fisherman	12	11-00	Eamon Murphy	Josh Gifford
1992	Elfast	9	11-00	Martin Lynch	John Webber
1993	Sacre d'Or	8	11-00	Graham McCourt	Nigel Tinkler
1994	Elfast	11	11-04	Graham McCourt	John Webber
1995	Kadi	6	10-04	Norman Williamson	David Nicholson
1996	Old Bridge	8	09-07	Gary Crone	Andrew Turnell
1997	Terao	11	10-07	Timmy Murphy	Martin Pipe
1998	Super Coin	10	10-00	Norman Williamson	Richard Lee
1999	Majadou	5	11-00	Tony McCoy	Martin Pipe
2000	Dark Stranger	9	10-03	Richard Johnson	Martin Pipe
	no race 2001 (Note: The 2001 running was cancelled because of a foot-and-mouth crisis)
2002	Blowing Wind	9	10–09	Ruby Walsh	Martin Pipe
2003	Young Spartacus	10	10-09	Richard Johnson	Henry Daly
2004	Tikram	7	10-00	Timmy Murphy	Gary L. Moore
2005	Liberthine	6	10-01	Sam Waley-Cohen	Nicky Henderson
2006	Non So	8	11-03	Mick Fitzgerald	Nicky Henderson
2007	Idole First	8	10-07	Alan O'Keeffe	Venetia Williams
2008	Mister McGoldrick	11	11-07	Dominic Elsworth	Sue Smith
2009	Something Wells	8	10-07	Will Biddick	Venetia Williams
2010	Great Endeavour	6	10-01	Danny Cook	David Pipe
2011	Holmwood Legend	10	10-09	Keiran Burke	Patrick Rodford
2012	Salut Flo	7	10–10	Tom Scudamore	David Pipe
2013	Carrickboy	9	10-05	Liam Treadwell	Venetia Williams
2014	Ballynagour	8	10-09	Tom Scudamore	David Pipe
2015	Darna	9	10–11	David Bass	Kim Bailey
2016	Empire of Dirt	9	10–11	Bryan Cooper	Colm Murphy
2017	Road to Respect	6	10–13	Bryan Cooper	Noel Meade
2018	The Storyteller	7	11–04	Davy Russell	Gordon Elliott
2019	Siruh Du Lac	6	10-08	Lizzie Kelly	Nick Williams
2020	Simply The Betts	7	11-04	Gavin Sheehan	Harry Whittington
2021	The Shunter	8	10-05	Jordan Gainford	Emmet Mullins
2022	Coole Cody	11	11-02	Adam Wedge	Evan Williams
2023	Seddon	10	10-09	Ben Harvey	John McConnell
2024	Shakem Up'Arry	10	11-05	Ben Jones	Ben Pauling
2025	Jagwar	6	10-10	Jonjo O'Neill Jr	Oliver Greenall & Josh Guerriero
2026	Madara	7	11-00	Harry Skelton	Dan Skelton

== See also ==
- Horse racing in Great Britain
- List of British National Hunt races
