= L'Ami =

L'Ami (meaning friend in French) is the surname of the following notable people:

- Alina l'Ami (born 1985), Romanian chess player
- Carlo l'Ami (born 1966), Dutch football coach and former player
- Dianne L'Ami (born 1976), Zealand basketball player
- Erwin l'Ami (born 1985), Dutch chess grandmaster, husband of Alina
