= Darren Owen =

British sports broadcaster

Darren Charles Owen is a horse racing commentator, born 3 June 1967 in St. Asaph, North Wales.

Having been interested in horse racing since a young age, Owen won the regional final of an amateur sports commentator competition, organised by BBC Radio 2 and sponsored by Foster's Lager, in 1989. He finished third in the nationwide final. Following this breakthrough, he began commentating on horse racing for BBC Radio Wales, starting with the 1989 Welsh National won by Bonanza Boy.

He contributed to both the Sporting Life and Racing Post from 1992, providing in-running comments for individual races. Following the closure of the Sporting Life, he continued to work for the Racing Post and still contributes to the present day - mainly at local racecourses such as Bangor-On-Dee, Chester and Haydock Park.

Joining the racecourse commentary team in 1997, Owen made his debut at Wolverhampton on 29 March. By the end of 2010, he had called at 40 of Britain's 60 racecourses. In 2011, Kempton Park, Yarmouth, Towcester and Plumpton will be new additions to his list, taking the total to forty-four.

Following a decision by the BBC to add a fourth commentator to their Grand National team, Owen joined Jim McGrath, Ian Bartlett and Tony O'Hehir for the 2004 running of the Aintree spectacular - taking the field from Valentine's Brook to the Melling Road. He continued in this position until 2010, when he moved to cover Becher's Brook, Foinavon and the Canal Turn. Since 2013 Owen has commentated on races over the Grand National course at the Grand National meeting for BBC Radio 5 Live.

He has also been heard calling at Chepstow and Haydock Park for BBC Television, including the last race to be transmitted from Haydock Park by the BBC before coverage switched to rival broadcaster, Channel 4.

When not working for the Racing Post or as a Racecourse Commentator, Owen can be heard at harness racing fixtures throughout the UK as well as a small-number of Point-to-Points, for William Hill Bookmakers, broadcasting to their betting shop estate and internet radio service and on the official racing audio services provided by Independent Content Services Limited.
