= Mon Môme =

French racehorse

- Sire: Passing Sale
- Grandsire: No Pass No Sale
- Dam: Etoile Du Lion
- Damsire: New Target
- Sex: Gelding
- Foaled: 29 April 2000
- Country: France
- Colour: bay
- Breeder: Alexandre Deschere
- Owner: Vida Bingham
- Trainer: Venetia Williams
- Record: 47:5-10-5
- Earnings: £751,521

Major wins
- Boylepoker.com Chase (2008); Grand National (2009)
- Last updated on 4 April 2009

Mon Môme (foaled 29 April 2000) is a retired AQPS steeplechaser, winner of the Grand National at Aintree Racecourse on 4 April 2009. He was ridden by Liam Treadwell and trained by Venetia Williams. He won by 12 lengths at odds of 100–1, making him the longest-priced winner since Foinavon in 1967.

Mon Môme was victorious in the second of three attempts to win the Grand National, having finished tenth in 2008 and parting company with rider Aidan Coleman in the 2010 race at the twenty-sixth of the thirty fences.

His victory in the 2009 race was exactly a century since the previous victory in the Grand National by a French-bred horse, Lutteur III, owned by Mr. James Hennessy and ridden by Georges Parfrement.

He was also third in the 2010 Cheltenham Gold Cup.

He was retired at the age of 13, with his last appearance being at Warwick on 10 March 2013. His trainer, Venetia Williams, said: "He's been an amazing horse to train and gave me the best day of my career when winning the Grand National."

Mon Môme's April 2009 victory made Williams, a former Grand National jockey, only the second woman after Jenny Pitman (Corbiere in 1983 and Royal Athlete in 1995) to train a National winner.
