= Jim McGrath (Australian commentator) =

Jim Aloysius McGrath (born 13 June 1952 in Charlton, Victoria, Australia) is a broadcaster who was the BBC's senior horse racing commentator from 1997 to 2012, when the corporation lost the television rights to all horse racing in Great Britain to Channel 4.

He was previously deputy race commentator, and sometimes a paddock commentator from 1993 to 1997, when Peter O'Sullevan was the lead commentator.

== Career ==
McGrath initially commentated in his native Australia but found few opportunities so he moved to Hong Kong in 1973.

In 1984 he moved to Europe, initially commentating at Phoenix Park in Dublin. In the same year he covered the Ebor meeting at York, receiving positive reviews from national news sources.

McGrath joined the BBC in time for the 1993 racing season. He succeeded Peter O'Sullevan as the BBC's senior race commentator in December 1997. He then commentated on all of the BBC's major meetings including the Derby and The Oaks, Royal Ascot, the Prix de l'Arc de Triomphe, the Irish Derby, the Hennessy Gold Cup, Glorious Goodwood, the Welsh National, and the world's most famous steeplechase, the Grand National. Before becoming the main race caller for the Grand National in 1998 he was stationed out in the country at Becher's Brook covering fences 5/21 - fences 9/25 (Valentine's Brook) from 1993 - 1997. The three portions of the 4½-mile race he would cover from 1998 would be from the start up to the first fence, the 13th to 17th fence, and from the 29th fence to the finishing post. McGrath called home the winner of every National from 1998 to 2012.

McGrath has also commentated on the Melbourne Cup in Australia.

In 2004 he became a presenter on At The Races. He was "Hotspur" of The Daily Telegraph from 1991 to 2014.

In 2013 the rights to televise British horse racing went exclusively to Channel 4 and McGrath decided not to make the move. He was publicly critical of the BBC for losing the National and other key meetings.

== Awards ==
McGrath won the Royal Television Society's Commentator of the Year award in 2001.
