= Timmy Murphy =

Irish jockey (born 1974)

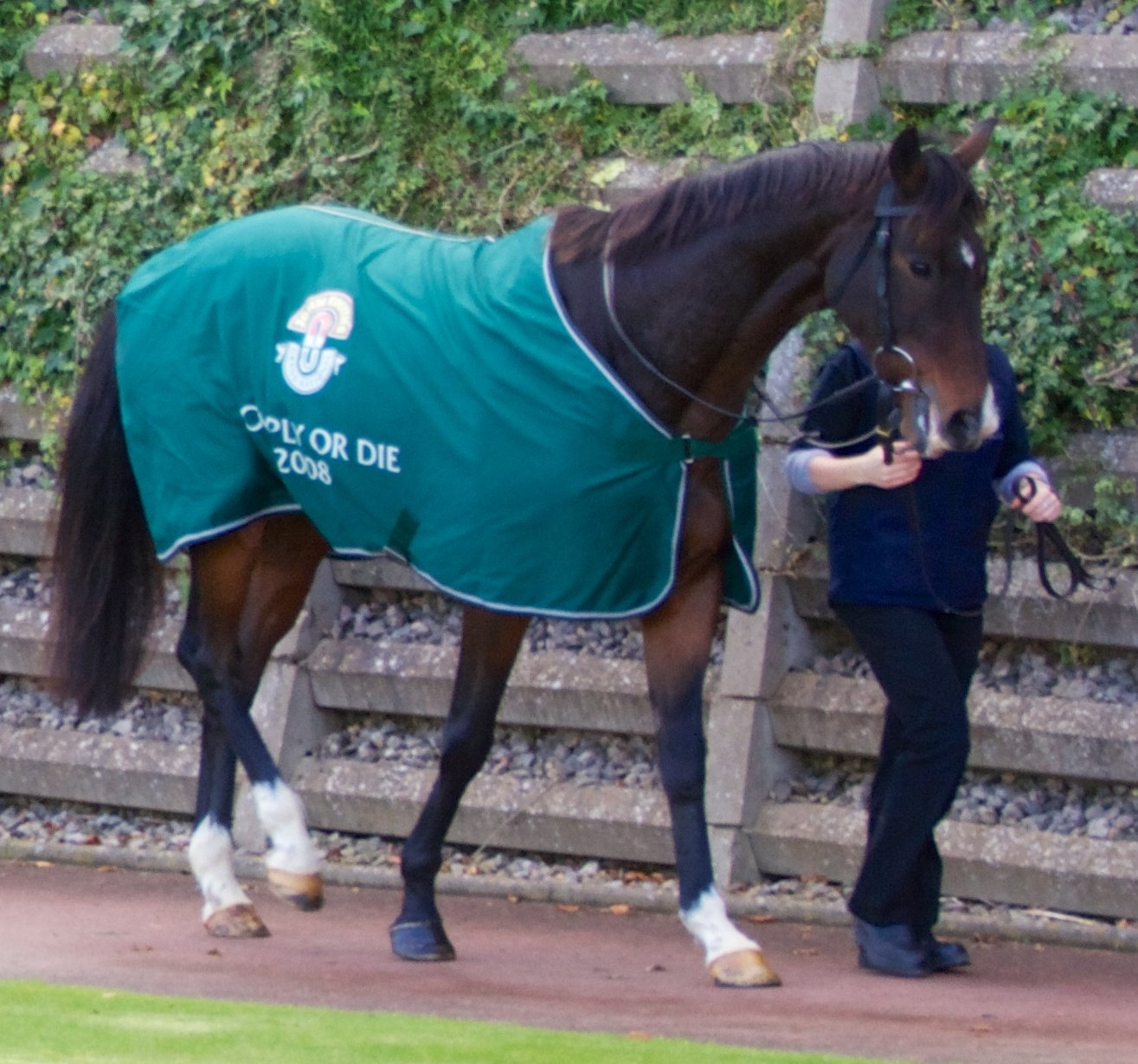
- Murphy won the 2008 Grand National on Comply or Die

Personal information
- Born: 20 August 1974 (age 52) County Kildare
- Occupation: Jockey

Horse racing career
- Sport: Horse racing

Racing awards
- 2005 jump jockey of the year Lester Award

Significant horses
- Beef Or Salmon; Al Eile; Our Vic; Comply or Die

Timothy James Murphy (born 20 August 1974 in County Kildare, Ireland), known as Timmy Murphy, is a retired Irish jockey who competed mostly in National Hunt racing. A multiple Grade 1-winning rider, he is best known for his victory on Comply or Die in the 2008 Grand National. He overcame problems with alcohol, which had led to a prison sentence after a drunken incident on a plane in 2002, to resume a successful career and win the 2005 jump jockey of the year Lester Award. He won the Irish Grand National on Davids Lad in 2001, and the Scottish Grand National on Merigo in 2010 and 2012. He had eight winners at the Cheltenham Festival, the first in 1997 and the last in 2009. He recorded his 1000th win in Britain in 2010. Following an injury in a fall in 2010 he was unable to regain his licence to ride over jumps and switched codes, riding on the flat from 2015 until 2018, when he retired from race riding.

== Background ==
Murphy was born on 20 August 1974 on Newberry Stud near Kilcullen where his father, former point-to-point jockey James Murphy, was stud groom. He grew up on the stud farm with brother Brian and learnt to ride as a young child. He went hunting and competed in gymkhanas and pony racing with his pony, Bluebell. At the age of fourteen he started riding out for trainer Noel Chance on the Curragh at weekends and during school holidays and began full-time work at the yard on leaving school shortly before his sixteenth birthday. He moved to the yard of trainer Dermot Weld and then to that of Declan Gillespie, but he was sacked from both yards and, apart from riding in a bumper and a point-to-point on horses owned by his father, had yet to ride on a racecourse. It was when he was working for trainer Mick Halford that he started to get rides with an amateur licence, winning his first point-to-point in 1993 on Gayloire at Kilmuckridge. After a stint with Michael Hourigan in Patrickswell, which brought in more point-to-point winners and a first bumper winner with The Real Article at Puchestown in 1994, Murphy moved to England in 1995. He turned professional later that year while working at the yard of trainer Kim Bailey in Lambourn, Berkshire.

== Career ==
Murphy rode 26 winners during his first season in England. In late 1996 he lost his job with Bailey, due to his drinking which left him unable to get up in the morning. He rode as a freelance for the rest of the 1996/97 season, riding 28 winners including his first Cheltenham Festival winner in March 1997 on Terao in the Mildmay of Flete Challenge Cup. At the beginning of the 1997/98 season he was offered the job of first stable jockey to trainer Paul Nicholls. The job involved only occasional work riding in the mornings, so Murphy's timekeeping was not a problem. He rode 60 winners that season, in spite of a total of 52 days' suspension for use of the whip, but lost his job in November 1998, due mainly to his lack of communication with owners. He was soon offered a job riding for owner Wally Sturt, whose horses were trained by Jim Old, and rode his second Cheltenham Festival winner in 1999 on Sturt's Sir Talbot in the Vincent O'Brien County Hurdle. He finished the season on 73 winners.

The following two seasons, 1999/2000 and 2000/01, Murphy was again riding freelance, and his tally of winners went down slightly. In November 1999 he won the Hennessy Gold Cup at Newbury on Ever Blessed for trainer Mark Pitman. In April 2001 Murphy rode Smarty, trained by Mark Pitman, into second place in the Grand National. The race is remembered for the atrocious wet and muddy conditions in which it was run and for a pile-up caused by a loose horse at the Canal Turn on the first circuit. Only two horses, Smarty and winner Red Marauder, finished unhindered, with two more finishing after being remounted. In May 2001 he won the Irish Grand National on Davids Lad. That summer Nicholls asked him to return to his yard at Ditcheat as stable jockey and the 2001/02 was Murphy's most successful to date, with 98 winners by mid-April.

In April 2002 Murphy rode the Nicholls-trained Cenkos into fifth place in the Nakayama Grand Jump in Japan. On the flight home, Murphy became very drunk and put his hand up the skirt of a cabin crew member. The police were waiting for him at Heathrow. In July 2002 he pleaded guilty to being drunk on an aeroplane and to sexual assault at Isleworh Crown Court and was sentenced to six months in prison. In the meantime he had spent five months in The Priory, Southampton, to address his problems with alcohol. After his release from Wormwood Scrubs, Murphy went to Ireland and spent a few weeks with trainer Michael Hourigan before returning to race riding. It was Hourigan's horse Beef Or Salmon who provided Murphy with the victories he needed to rebuild his career, winning the Ericsson Chase in December 2002 and the Irish Gold Cup in February 2003. Murphy rode Beef Or Salmon in fifteen races for seven wins, including five Grade 1s.

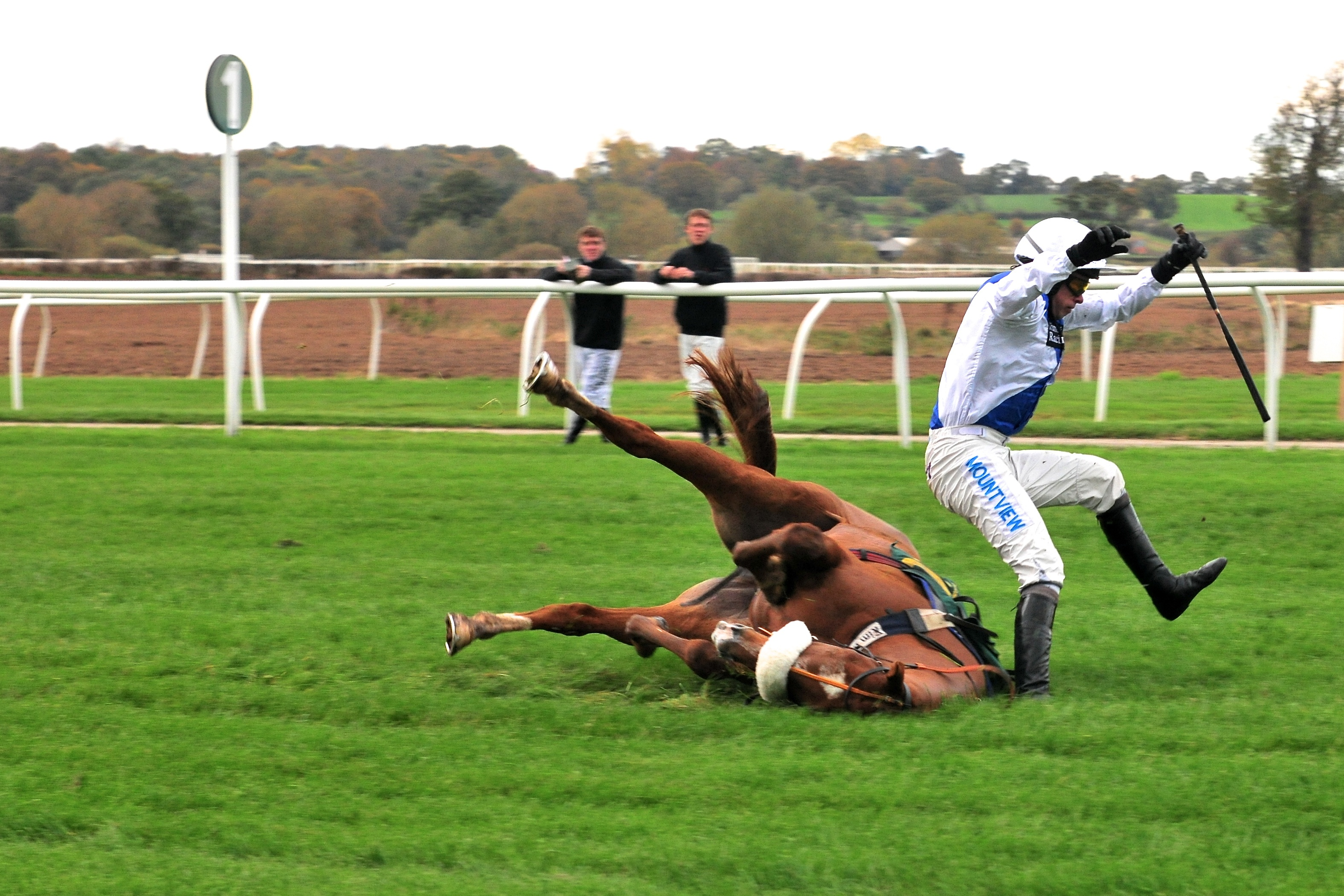
Murphy falling from Savant Bleu in 2012

Murphy rode two winners at the 2004 Cheltenham Festival: Tikram in the Mildmay of Flete Challenge Cup and Creon in the Pertemps Final. In May 2004 Murphy was signed as retained rider for Martin Pipe's major owner David Johnson. He rode two winners for Pipe at the 2005 Cheltenham Festival, Contraband in the Arkle Chase and Fontanesi in the Vincent O'Brien County Hurdle, and the following month won the Aintree Hurdle on Al Eile for trainer John Queally. He finished the season on 143 winners, the first time he had passed a century. Murphy was awarded the 2005 Lester Award for jump jockey of the year.

In the 2005/6 season Murphy rode Our Vic, owned by Johnson and trained by Pipe, to wins in the Paddy Power Gold Cup, the Grade 1 Ascot Chase and the Silver Trophy Chase. The following season Our Vic, now trained by David Pipe, who had taken over the licence from his father, won the Charlie Hall Chase and Al Eile won a second Aintree Hurdle.

In March 2008 Murphy won the Ryanair Chase on Old Vic, taking his Festival tally to seven. On 5 April 2008 Johnson's Comply or Die provided Murphy with the highlight of his career when they won the Grand National. Murphy rode Comply or Die in the following three Grand Nationals, coming second to Mon Mome in 2009, twelfth in 2010 and pulling up in 2011. When Comply or Die retired, he went to live at Murphy's Cilldara Stud. The 2008 Aintree meeting also saw Murphy win the Totesport Bowl Chase on Old Vic, beating Kauto Star by a nose, and secure a third win on Al Eile in the Aintree Hurdle.

In 2009 Murphy rode his eighth, and final, Cheltenham Festival winner with Chapoturgeon, trained by Nicholls, in the Centenary Novices' Handicap Chase. In January 2010 he rode his 1000th British National Hunt winner. In 2010 and 2012 he rode Merigo, trained by Andrew Parker and owned by Murphy's father-in-law Ray Green, to victory in the Scottish Grand National. In December 2013 Murphy was suspended for nine days after starting a fight in the weighing room, during which his shoulder was discolated when he was restrained by a jockeys' valet. A fall in January 2014 caused another dislocation and Murphy underwent surgery. When he returned to race riding in May 2015 it was with a licence to ride on the flat, as he was not passed as medically fit to ride over jumps. His first winner on the flat was at Wolverhampton Racecourse on 7 May 2015 on Houdini, trained by Jamie Osborne. The trainer, himself a former National Hunt jockey, said that Murphy's style of riding would stand him in good stead in flat racing: "One thing that he has always been is a master of almost smuggling a horse through from A to B as efficiently as possible".

Murphy rode for three seasons on the flat, riding 31 winners in 2017. He struggled with his weight however and decided to retire aged 43 in 2018, his last race being a win on Happy Escape at Chepstow on 15 May 2018.

== Personal life ==
Murphy met his partner Dawn Symonds, who was a work rider for trainer Mark Pitman, in 1999 and the couple had a son, Shane, in December 2000. They separated in 2005. In 2008 Murphy married Verity Green, daughter of Scottish racehorse owner Ray Green. The couple have two sons, Lucas and Finn, who compete in pony racing. Murphy's Cilldara Stud near Cheltenham provides rest and recuperation for racehorses.

In 2002, Murphy was sentenced to six months imprisonment for indecently assaulting an air stewardess on a Virgin Atlantic flight from Tokyo to London Heathrow. He ultimately spent 84 days in Wormwood Scrubs before returning to racing.

== Cheltenham Festival winners (8) ==
- Arkle Challenge Trophy - (1) Contraband (2005)
- Ryanair Chase - (1) Our Vic (2008)
- Centenary Novices' Handicap Chase - (1) Chapoturgeon (2009)
- Pertemps Final - (1) Creon (2004)
- Brown Advisory & Merriebelle Stable Plate Handicap Chase - (2) Terao (1997), Tikram (2004)
- County Handicap Hurdle - (2) Sir Talbot (1999), Fontanesi (2005)

== Major wins ==
(United Kingdom) Great Britain

- Grand National - (1) Comply or Die (2008)
- Henry VIII Novices' Chase - (2) Contraband (2004), Racing Demon (2005)
- Finale Juvenile Hurdle - (1) Hollow Tree (2011)
- Challow Novices' Hurdle - (1) Diamond Harry (2009)
- Tolworth Novices' Hurdle - (2) Thisthatandtother (2003), Marcel (2005)
- Clarence House Chase - (1) Well Chief (2005)
- Ascot Chase - (1) Our Vic (2006)
- Anniversary 4-Y-O Novices' Hurdle - (1) Al Eile (2004)
- Betway Bowl - (2) Celestial Gold (2006), Our Vic (2008)
- Aintree Hurdle - (3) Al Eile (2005, 2007, 2008)
- Maghull Novices' Chase - (1) Armaturk (2002)
- Celebration Chase - (2) Well Chief (2005), Dempsey (2007)

(Republic of Ireland) Ireland

- Irish Gold Cup - (1) Beef Or Salmon (2003)
- Punchestown Gold Cup - (1) Beef Or Salmon (2004)
- Irish Grand National - (1) Davids Lad (2001)
- Drinmore Novice Chase - (1) Jessies Dream (2010)
- Faugheen Novice Chase - (1) Hi Cloy (2003)
- Savills Chase - (1) Beef Or Salmon (2002)
- Fort Leney Novice Chase - (1) Be My Belle (2002)
- Arkle Novice Chase - (1) Ulaan Baatar (2005)
