= Ian Bartlett =

British sports commentator

Ian Bartlett is a horse racing commentator and occasionally was an analyst for the BBC. He has also commentated for Channel 4 Racing.

Bartlett has always been associated with his role at Aintree. He commentated for SIS's feed of their Grand National coverage from 1998 to 2001. (Except 2000, where the BBC's commentary team gave live pictures and commentary for SIS). For the BBC's television coverage of the Grand National, from 2004 up to and including the 2012 race after which the BBC lost the rights, Bartlett commentated on four sections of the 4½-mile steeplechase, from the 1st to 5th fence, 10th to 12th, 17th to 21st and 26th to 28th. It wasn't expected any BBC commentators would move to Channel 4 but Bartlett did join Channel 4 and started commentating on the Grand National at Aintree for Channel 4 in 2013 and joined Richard Hoiles and lead commentator Simon Holt in the commentary box. He also joined Mick Fitzgerald, Clare Balding and Rishi Persad in moving from the BBC to Channel 4. While working for Channel 4's Grand National coverage, he was stationed out in the country picking up the commentary from the fifth fence to the tenth, before handing back over to Simon Holt. During this stint, he runs the viewers over the action over most of the signature fences in the race, including Becher's Brook and the Canal Turn. In 2017 Bartlett continued his association with the Grand National when ITV took over the broadcasting rights, he continued to cover the signature fences out in the country until he finished commentating on the Grand National after the 2022 running.

Also known by his racing peers as Barty, he is known for his love of Veuve and claims that his Mastermind specialist subject would be the road network of the United Kingdom as he drives in excess of 40,000 miles per year.

Bartlett also counts comedy duo Hale & Pace amongst his closest friends after working with them on the television show Jobs for the Boys.

Ian Bartlett's terrestrial television Grand National commentary posts

•2004 - 2009 (BBC)

1st - 4th

17th - 20th

•2010 - 2012 (BBC)

1st - 4th, 10th - Anchor Bridge crossing

17th - 20th, 26th - Anchor Bridge crossing

•2013 - 2016 (Channel 4)

5th - 10th

21st - 26th

•2017 - 2022 (ITV)

5th - 9th

21st - 25th
