= David Pipe (racehorse trainer) =

British horse racing trainer (born 1973)

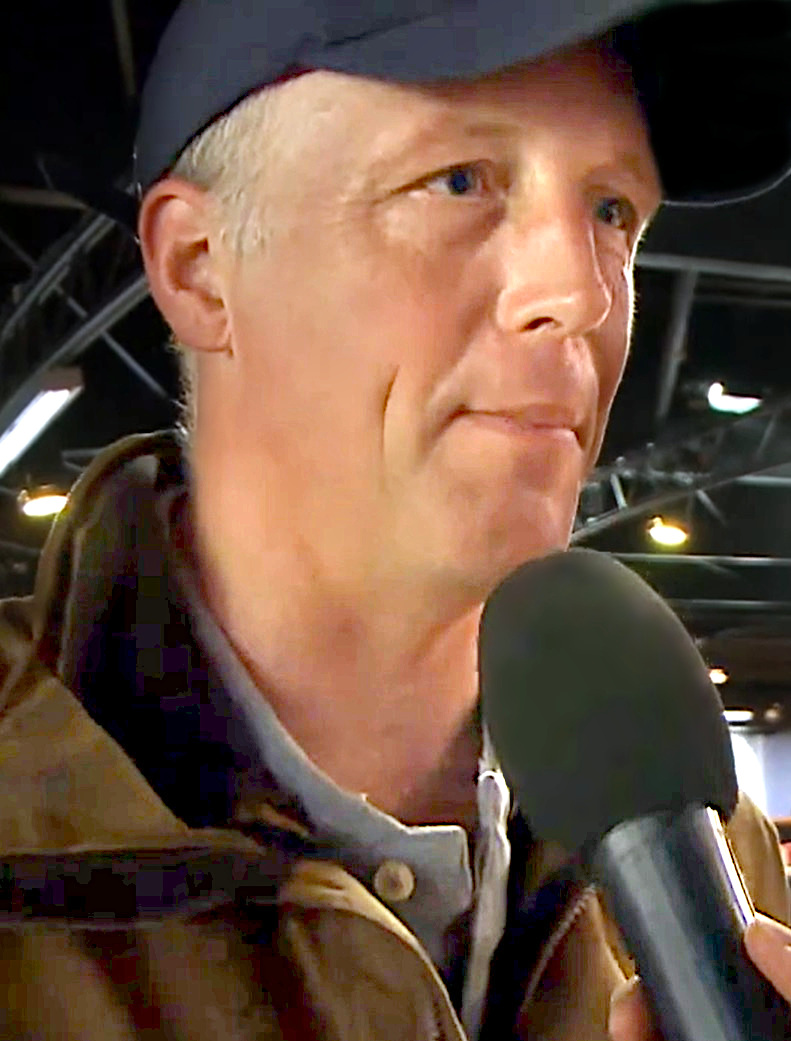
David Pipe in 2016

David Pipe (born 7 February 1973) is a British horse racing trainer based in Somerset, England. He is the son of 15 time champion trainer Martin Pipe.

== Early career ==
Pipe started riding in point to points in 1992 and scored 22 wins in 5 seasons, and 2 under rules - including on Bonanza Boy in the Ludlow Gold Cup. After retiring from the saddle he would begin learning the training craft across the globe spending time with Michael Dickinson, Criquette Head-Maarek and Joey Ramsden.

== Training career ==
Pipe had great success with training point to point horses; 164 winners over six seasons. In April 2006, he took over the training licence from his father Martin Pipe. His first winners as racing trainer came on 9 May 2006 with Standin Obligation at Kelso Racecourse. On the same day at Exeter Racecourse he had another winner with Papillon De Iena ridden by AP McCoy.

During his first season, Pipe struck success with Gaspara winning the Imperial Cup and the Fred Winter his first trained winner at the Cheltenham Festival along with a £75,000 bonus.

Long term Pipe owner David Johnson provided Pipe with some of his early successes. Our Vic won the Charlie Hall Chase at Wetherby and would go on to win the 2008 Ryanair Chase at Cheltenham. A few weeks later, Our Vic also won the totesport Bowl Chase at Aintree Racecourse on Grand National weekend beating Kauto Star by a nose. Comply Or Die was the victor in the 2008 Grand National at Aintree. Later in 2008, Pipe would saddle the winner of the Hennessy Gold Cup at Newbury with Madison Du Berlais.

Pipe has saddled 15 winners at the Cheltenham Festival. Both Our Vic and Dynaste have won the Ryanair Chase, Buena Vista is a two time Pertemps Final winner and Western Warhorse won the 2014 Arkle.

Pipe has also seen success with the likes of Vieux Lion Rouge and Un Temps Pour Tout, the latter winning at both the Cheltenham Festival and Grade 1 Grand Course de Haies d'Auteuil in France.

In addition, Pipe has successes on the flat winning the Chester Cup with Mamlook and also winning the Ascot Stakes during Royal Ascot with Junior who later went on to win the Fulke Walwyn Kim Muir Challenge Cup at the Cheltenham Festival.

Pipe has over 1,000 winners to his name as a trainer and has trained a winner at every course in the UK.

== Cheltenham festival winners (15) ==
- Ryanair Chase (2) - Our Vic (2008), Dynaste (2014)
- Arkle Challenge Trophy - Western Warhorse (2014)
- Champion Bumper - Moon Racer (2015)
- Paddy Power Plate Handicap Chase (3) - Great Endeavour (2010), Salut Flo (2012), Ballynagour (2014)
- Ultima Handicap Chase (2) - Un Temps Pour Tout (2016, 2017)
- Festival Trophy Handicap Chase - An Accordion (2008)
- Pertemps Final (2) - Buena Vista (2010, 2011)
- Fulke Walwyn Kim Muir Challenge Cup (2) - Junior (2011), The Package (2015)
- Fred Winter - Gaspara (2007)

== Major wins ==
(United Kingdom) Great Britain

- Ryanair Chase (2) - Our Vic (2008), Dynaste (2014)
- Kauto Star Novices Chase (2) - Grands Crus (2011), Dynaste (2012)
- Long Walk Hurdle - Lough Derg (2007)
- Clarence House Chase - Tamarinbleu (2008)
- Arkle Challenge Trophy - Western Warhorse (2014)
- Champion Bumper - Moon Racer (2015)
- Finale Juvenile Hurdle - Adagio (2021)

(Republic of Ireland) Ireland

- Champion INH Flat Race - The Liquidator (2013)

France

- Grand Course de Haies d'Auteuil - Un Temps Pour Tout (2015)
