= Venetia Williams =

British horse trainer

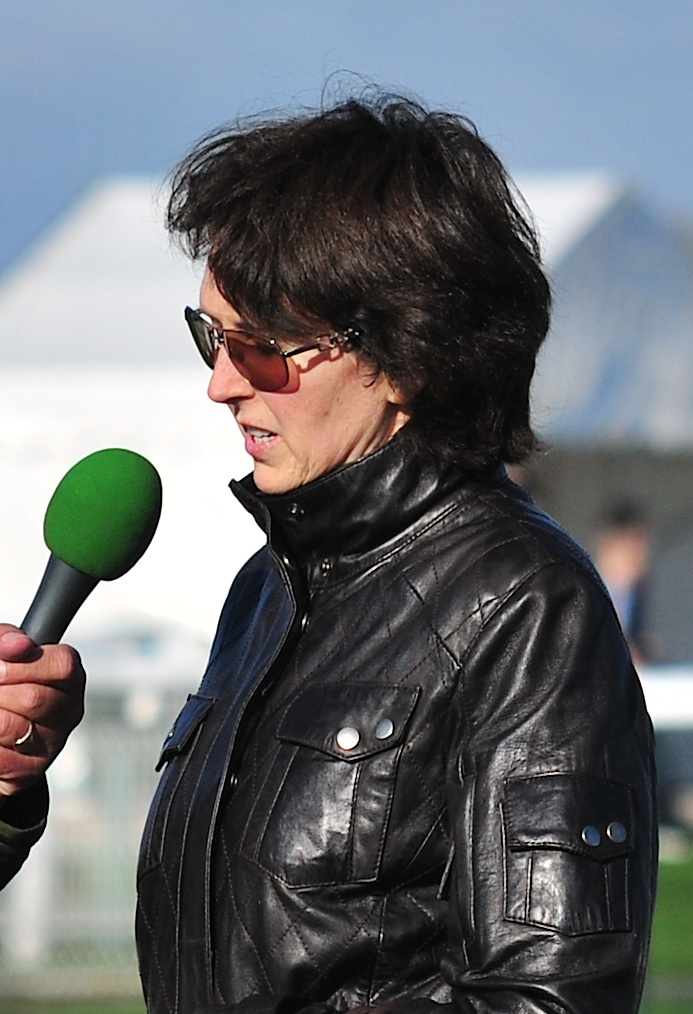
- Venetia Williams at Bangor Races in 2012

Personal information
- Born: 10 May 1960 (age 66) Scorrier, Cornwall, England
- Occupation: Racehorse trainer

Horse racing career
- Sport: Horse racing

Major racing wins
- Hennessy Gold Cup; King George VI Chase

Significant horses
- Teeton Mill; Mon Mome

Venetia Williams (born 10 May 1960) is an English racehorse trainer specialising in National Hunt racing. She is based at stables at Aramstone in Herefordshire, England. She won the Hennessy Gold Cup and King George VI Chase with Teeton Mill in 1998, and went on to win the 2009 Grand National with 100-1 outsider Mon Mome.

== Life and career ==
Williams was born 10 May 1960, at Scorrier House, Cornwall. She started as an amateur National Hunt jockey, she rode in the Grand National in 1988 and fell at Bechers Brook, and another fall 2 weeks later at Worcester Racecourse, she was forced to retire after sustaining a broken neck. She worked for racehorse trainers Martin Pipe and John Edwards, before herself taking up a licence to train in 1995.

In 2009, she won the Grand National with 100-1 outsider Mon Mome. This victory made her only the second female trainer to win the race, after Jenny Pitman. After the race, even Williams was shocked by the outcome, saying, "How can you ever expect that? It's unbelievable." She also trained Teeton Mill, winner of the Hennessy Gold Cup and King George VI Chase in 1998.

She trained Something Wells to a win in the Freddie Williams Festival Plate at the 2009 Cheltenham Festival, saddling the first two home, less than two hours after winning with Kayf Aramis in the Pertemps Final at the same meeting.

Her total earnings for hurdles, chasing and National Hunt flat totalled over £5 million pounds in 2024.

== Major wins ==
(United Kingdom) Great Britain

- Grand National - (1) Mon Mome (2009)
- Hennessy Gold Cup - (1) Teeton Mill (1998)
- King George VI Chase - (1) Teeton Mill (1998)
- Betfair Chase - (2) Royale Pagaille (2023, 2024)
- Scilly Isles Novices' Chase - (2) Golden Goal (2002) & L'Homme Presse (2022)
- Ascot Chase - (1) Teeton Mill (1999)
- Brown Advisory Novices' Chase - (1) L'Homme Presse (2022)

== See also ==
- List of female Grand National jockeys
