= 2015 Grand National =

Horse race held in 2015

- Grand National
- Location: Aintree Racecourse
- Date: 11 April 2015
- Winning horse: (Republic of Ireland) Many Clouds
- Starting price: 25/1
- Jockey: (Republic of Ireland) Leighton Aspell
- Trainer: (England) Oliver Sherwood
- Owner: (England) Trevor Hemmings
- Conditions: Good to soft

External videos
- Full replay of the 2015 Grand National Racing TV, YouTube

The 2015 Grand National (officially known as the 2015 Crabbie's Grand National for sponsorship reasons) was the 168th annual running of the Grand National horse race at Aintree Racecourse near Liverpool, England. The showpiece steeplechase took place on 11 April 2015, the final day of a three-day meeting. A field of 39 runners competed for a share of the £1 million prize fund, and all returned safely to the stables following the race.

The 2015 National was won by Many Clouds, ridden by Leighton Aspell and trained by Oliver Sherwood. This was Aspell's second consecutive Grand National victory, having won aboard Pineau de Re in 2014. Many Clouds is owned by Trevor Hemmings, who also owned the winners in 2005 and 2011.

The race was sponsored by ginger-beer producer Crabbie's for the second year. It was broadcast live on television by Channel 4, which took over the television rights after 2012; and on radio by BBC Radio, which has held the radio rights since 1927, and Talksport, which was covering the race live for the second time.

== Race card ==
Entries for the 2015 Grand National closed on 3 February 2015 and 98 entrants were announced the following day, down from the record 115 that had been received for the 2014 race. Prior to the handicap announcement one horse was scratched, while another was ruled out as unqualified. Handicap weights were announced by the British Horseracing Authority in London on 17 February. A scratching deadline on 3 March saw the total number of horses reduced to 87; the second scratching deadline on 24 March reduced the field to 74. The five-day confirmation stage took place on 6 April and left 65 potential runners, reduced to 40 on 9 April.

One horse, number 14 Carlito Brigante, was subsequently declared a non-runner, reducing the field to 39 – the first time since 2004 that the maximum 40 did not start.

No	Colours	Horse	Age	Handicap (st–lb)	SP	Jockey	Trainer
1		Lord Windermere (IRE)	9	11–10		Brian O'Connell	Jim Culloty (IRE)
2		Many Clouds (IRE)	8	11–09		Leighton Aspell	Oliver Sherwood
3		Unioniste (FRA)	7	11–06		Noel Fehily	Paul Nicholls
4		Rocky Creek (IRE)	9	11–03		Sam Twiston-Davies	Paul Nicholls
5		First Lieutenant (IRE)	10	11–03		Ms. Nina Carberry	Mouse Morris (IRE)
6		Balthazar King (IRE)	11	11–02		Richard Johnson	Philip Hobbs
7		Shutthefrontdoor (IRE)	8	11–02		Tony McCoy	Jonjo O'Neill (IRE)
8		Pineau de Re (FRA)	12	11–00		Daryl Jacob	Richard Newland
9		Ballycasey (IRE)	8	10–13		Ruby Walsh	Willie Mullins (IRE)
10		Spring Heeled (IRE)	8	10–12		Nick Scholfield	Jim Culloty (IRE)
11		Rebel Rebellion (IRE)	10	10–12		Ryan Mahon	Paul Nicholls
12		Dolatulo (FRA)	8	10–11		Dougie Costello	Warren Greatrex
13		Mon Parrain (FRA)	9	10–11		Sean Bowen	Paul Nicholls
14		Non-Runner	N/A	N/A		N/A	N/A
15		Night in Milan (IRE)	9	10–09		James Reveley	Keith Reveley
16		Rubi Light (IRE)	10	10–09		Andrew Lynch	Robert Hennessy (IRE)
17		The Druids Nephew (IRE)	8	10–09		Aidan Coleman	Neil Mulholland
18		Cause of Causes (USA)	7	10–09		Paul Carberry	Gordon Elliott (IRE)
19		Godsmejudge (IRE)	9	10–08		Wayne Hutchinson	Alan King
20		Al Co (FRA)	10	10–08		Denis O'Regan	Peter Bowen
21		Monbeg Dude (IRE)	10	10–07		Liam Treadwell	Michael Scudamore
22		Corrin Wood (IRE)	8	10–07		David Casey	Donald McCain
23		The Rainbow Hunter	11	10–07		David Bass	Kim Bailey
24		Saint Are (FRA)	9	10–06		Paddy Brennan	Tom George
25		Across the Bay (IRE)	11	10–06		Henry Brooke	Donald McCain
26		Tranquil Sea (IRE)	13	10–05		Gavin Sheehan	Warren Greatrex
27		Oscar Time (IRE)	14	10–05		Mr. Sam Waley-Cohen	Robert Waley-Cohen
28		Bob Ford (IRE)	8	10–04		Paul Townend	Rebecca Curtis
29		Super Duty (IRE)	9	10–04		Will Kennedy	Ian Williams
30		Wyck Hill (IRE)	11	10–04		Tom Cannon	David Bridgwater
31		Gas Line Boy (IRE)	9	10–04		James Best	Philip Hobbs
32		Chance Du Roy (FRA)	11	10–04		Tom O'Brien	Philip Hobbs
33		Portrait King (IRE)	10	10–03		Davy Condon	Maurice Phelan (IRE)
34		Owega Star (IRE)	8	10–03		Robbie Power	Peter Fahey (IRE)
35		River Choice (FRA)	12	10–03		David Cottin	Richard Chotard (FRA)
36		Court by Surprise (FRA)	10	10–03		Richie McLernon	Emma Lavelle
37		Alvarado (FRA)	10	10–03		Paul Moloney	Fergal O'Brien
38		Soll	10	10–02		Tom Scudamore	David Pipe
39		Ely Brown (IRE)	10	10–02		Jonathan Burke	Charlie Longsdon
40		Royale Knight	9	10–02		Brendan Powell	Richard Newland

- Great Britain unless stated.
- Amateur jockeys denoted by preceding title, e.g. Mr.

Robbie McNamara was due to ride Lord Windermere but withdrew due to injury.

== Race overview ==
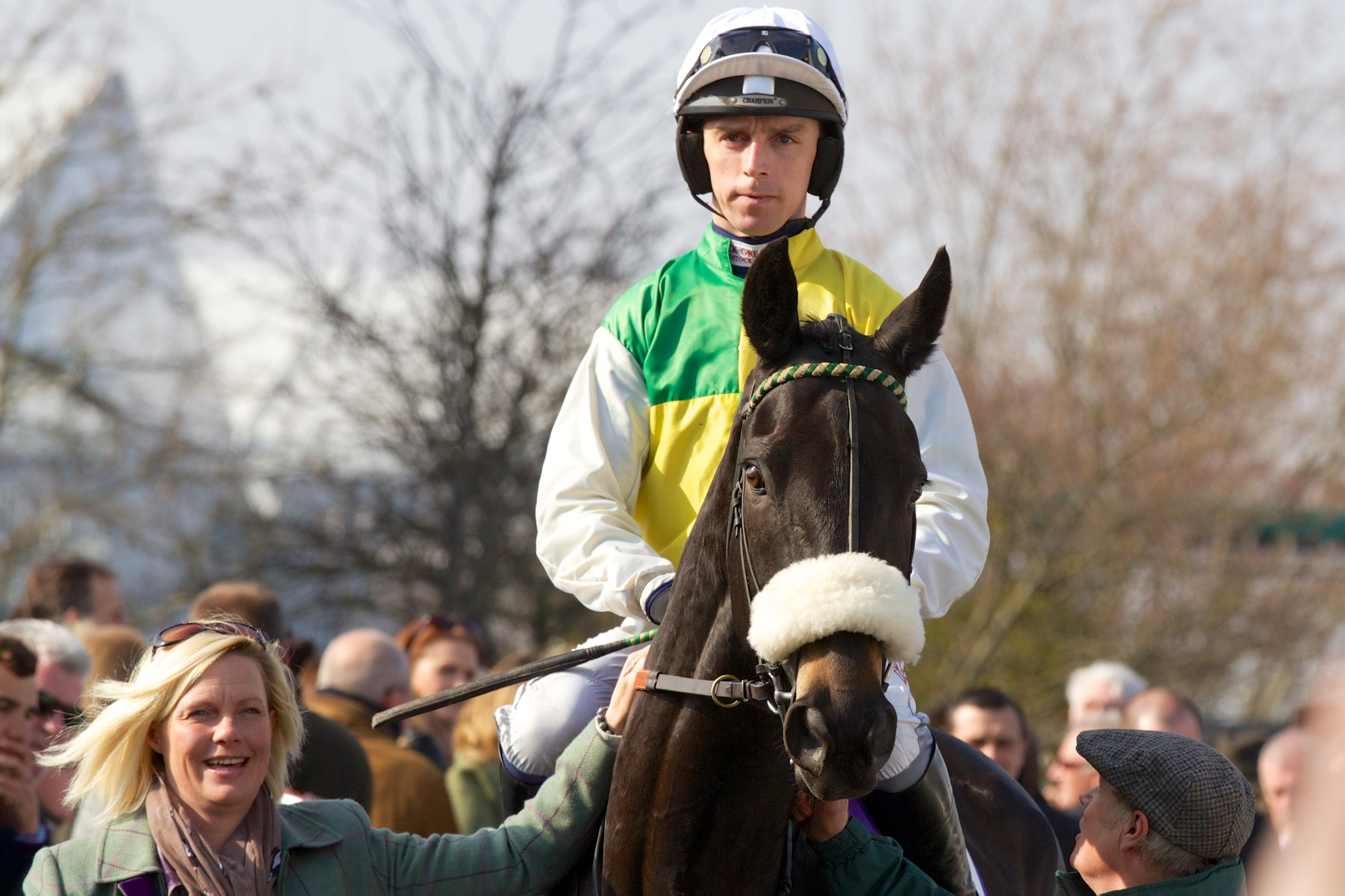
Winning jockey Leighton Aspell pictured in 2014 aboard Many Clouds

The race saw a larger than usual number of fallers on the first lap, including the favoured Balthazar King, whose fall at the Canal Turn led to the field being diverted around that fence on the final lap. Jockey Ruby Walsh (whose horse Ballycasey was brought down) helped stewards alert the field to the diversion. Balthazar King suffered broken ribs in the fall.

Many eyes were on Tony McCoy on the favourite Shutthefrontdoor on what was his last Grand National. He told the media he would retire immediately after the race if he won but his mount ran out of stamina on the home turn and eventually finished fifth.

It was left to Many Clouds, ridden by Leighton Aspell, to come through to win the race. Aspell became the first rider to win successive Nationals since Brian Fletcher rode Red Rum to victory in 1973 and 1974. Saint Are finished second, with Monbeg Dude third, and Alvarado fourth for the second time. Pineau de Re, the previous year's winner and now ridden by Daryl Jacob, finished 12th.

== Finishing order ==
Placed horses

1: Many Clouds

2: Saint Are

3: Monbeg Dude

4: Alvarado

Nineteen runners completed the course as follows:

Position	Horse	Jockey	SP	Distance	Prize money
1st	Many Clouds	Leighton Aspell	25/1	Won by 1 3/4 lengths	£561,300
2nd	Saint Are	Paddy Brennan	25/1	6 lengths	£211,100
3rd	Monbeg Dude	Liam Treadwell	40/1	3 1/2 lengths	£105,500
4th	Alvarado	Paul Moloney	20/1	1 1/2 lengths	£52,700
5th	Shutthefrontdoor	Tony McCoy	6/1 F	2 1/4 lengths	£26,500
6th	Royale Knight	Brendan Powell	25/1	10 lengths	£13,200
7th	Tranquil Sea	Gavin Sheehan	33/1	2 1/4 lengths	£6,800
8th	Cause of Causes	Paul Carberry	14/1	14 lengths	£3,600
9th	Soll	Tom Scudamore	9/1	10 lengths	£2,000
10th	Chance Du Roy	Tom O'Brien	40/1	5 lengths	£1,000
11th	Mon Parrain	Sean Bowen	33/1	1 1/2 lengths	
12th	Pineau de Re	Daryl Jacob	25/1	6 lengths	
13th	Owega Star	Robbie Power	50/1	25 lengths	
14th	Spring Heeled	Nick Scholfield	25/1	2 1/2 lengths	
15th	Oscar Time	Mr. Sam Waley-Cohen	20/1	3 3/4 lengths	
16th	First Lieutenant	Ms. Nina Carberry	14/1	5 lengths	
17th	Rocky Creek	Sam Twiston-Davies	8/1	2 1/2 lengths	
18th	Night in Milan	James Reveley	20/1	3 1/4 lengths	
19th	Dolatulo	Dougie Costello	66/1	Last to complete	

== Non-finishers ==
Fence	Horse	Jockey	SP	Fate
1	Ely Brown	Brian Hughes	100/1	Fell
1	Gas Line Boy	James Best	66/1	Fell
1	Al Co	Denis O'Regan	18/1	Unseated rider
3 (open ditch)	Rubi Light	Andrew Lynch	50/1	Unseated rider
4	Corrin Wood	David Casey	66/1	Pulled up
5	Unioniste	Noel Fehily	16/1	Fell
6 (Becher's Brook)	River Choice	David Cottin	100/1	Fell
8 (Canal Turn)	Balthazar King	Richard Johnson	17/2	Fell
8 (Canal Turn)	Ballycasey	Ruby Walsh	25/1	Brought down
19	Court by Surprise	Richie McLernon	33/1	Pulled up
25 (Valentine's)	Across the Bay	Henry Brooke	33/1	Pulled up
25 (Valentine's)	Super Duty	Will Kennedy	66/1	Pulled up
25 (Valentine's)	Lord Windermere	Brian O'Connell	33/1	Pulled up
26	The Rainbow Hunter	David Bass	33/1	Fell
26	The Druids Nephew	Aidan Coleman	10/1	Fell
27 (open ditch)	Rebel Rebellion	Ryan Mahon	33/1	Pulled up
28 (ditch)	Portrait King	Davy Condon	50/1	Fell
29	Godsmejudge	Wayne Hutchinson	18/1	Pulled up
29	Wyck Hill	Tom Cannon	66/1	Pulled up
29	Bob Ford	Paul Townend	50/1	Pulled up

== Broadcasting and media ==
They make the long run-in now, and Many Clouds still out in front by two or three lengths to Saint Are. Monbeg Dude still stays on, then Shutthefrontdoor. A furlong left to go, passing the elbow. Many Clouds by three lengths to Saint Are. Many Clouds is getting tired. Saint Are stays on down the outside. Many Clouds by two lengths, by a length and a half! Here comes the line, it's Leighton Aspell! Back to back Grand Nationals, he wins on Many Clouds! Many Clouds has won the National.

— Channel 4 lead commentator Simon Holt describes the climax of the race.

With Clare Balding unavailable to present Channel 4's coverage, due to her BBC commitments as The Boat Race was unusually held on the same day, Nick Luck therefore led the coverage, being the first male lead presenter of the race since 1999. Luck's usual role of anchoring the event from the trackside studio was filled by Emma Spencer, supported by Jim McGrath and Graham Cunningham. Reports were provided by Mick Fitzgerald and Alice Plunkett and betting updates by Tanya Stevenson and Brian Gleeson. To broaden the scope of its coverage, flat racing jockey Frankie Dettori joined the team as a guest reporter for race day and more emphasis was placed on style and fashion of racegoers and celebrities, with fashion expert Gok Wan presenting segments on both race day and the preceding 'Ladies Day' on the festival meeting.

The commentary team was by Richard Hoiles, Ian Bartlett and Simon Holt, who called the winner home for the third time. Following the race, Spencer, Fitzgerald and Hoiles guided viewers on a fence-by-fence analysis of the race.

Further Channel 4 programming in the build-up to the race included special editions of chatshow Alan Carr: Chatty Man and Sunday Brunch, the latter being shown under the title of Weekend Brunch, with segments of the programme coming direct from Aintree.

The BBC continued an unbroken run of 83 consecutive renewals of the race to be broadcast live on radio, dating back to 1927. The race was part of its 5 Live Sport broadcast, presented by Mark Pougatch with pre-race build-up from former National riders Andrew Thornton and Luke Harvey. Cornelius Lysaght interviewed connections in the ring and Rob Nothman provided market updates. The commentary team for the race itself was Malcolm Tomlinson, Darren Owen, Gary O'Brien and John Hunt, who called the finish.

== See also ==
- Horseracing in Great Britain
- List of British National Hunt races
