= 2014 Grand National =

English steeplechase horse race

- Grand National
- Location: Aintree Racecourse
- Date: 5 April 2014
- Winning horse: (France) Pineau de Re
- Starting price: 25/1
- Jockey: (Republic of Ireland) Leighton Aspell
- Trainer: (England) Richard Newland
- Owner: John A. Provan
- Conditions: Good to soft

External videos
- Full replay of the 2014 Grand National Racing TV, YouTube

The 2014 Grand National (officially known as the 2014 Crabbie's Grand National for sponsorship reasons) was the 167th annual running of the Grand National horse race at Aintree Racecourse near Liverpool, England. The showpiece steeplechase, which concluded a three-day meeting (one of only four held at Aintree throughout the year), took place on 5 April 2014. The maximum permitted field of 40 runners competed for a share of a record £1 million prize fund, which makes the National the most valuable jump race in Europe.

It was sponsored by Crabbie's for the first time, the ginger beer producer having taken over the sponsorship rights from John Smith's after the 2013 Grand National. The race was broadcast live on television by Channel 4 for the second time, having won the TV rights from the BBC after 2012, while the BBC retains the UK radio coverage rights it has held since 1927.

Pineau de Re, a 25/1 shot ridden by Leighton Aspell, won the race for trainer Dr Richard Newland and owner John Provan, to become the sixth French-bred horse to win the Grand National. Eighteen runners completed the course, and all returned safely to the stables.

== Race card ==
Entries for the Grand National had to be submitted by 28 January 2014. The following day, Aintree announced that 115 horses had been entered for consideration in the 2014 Grand National, an increase of 31 on the previous year and the highest number of initial entries since 2009. Handicap weights were announced by the British Horseracing Authority in London on 11 February.

There were scratchings' deadlines on 25 February and 18 March, after which 73 horses went forward to the five-day confirmation stage on 31 March. At that time they were reduced to 65 in total and the remaining contenders were ranked according to their ratings. On 3 April the final field of 40 runners was declared as follows:

No	Colours	Horse	Age	Handicap (st-lb)	SP	Jockey	Trainer	Owner(s)
1		Tidal Bay (IRE)	13	11–10	16/1	Sam Twiston-Davies	Paul Nicholls	A. & G. Wylie
2		Long Run (FRA)	9	11–09	12/1	Mr. Sam Waley-Cohen	Nicky Henderson	Robert Waley-Cohen
3		Hunt Ball (IRE)	9	11–07	50/1	Andrew Tinkler	Nicky Henderson	Atlantic Equine
4		Triolo d'Alene (FRA)	7	11–06	16/1	Barry Geraghty	Nicky Henderson	S. & C. Orr
5		Rocky Creek (IRE)	8	11–05	16/1	Noel Fehily	Paul Nicholls	Johnson & Stewart families
6		Quito de la Roque (FRA)	10	11–01	40/1	Brian O'Connell	Colm Murphy (IRE)	Gigginstown House Stud
7		Colbert Station (IRE)	10	11–00	33/1	Mark Walsh	Ted Walsh (IRE)	J. P. McManus
8		Walkon (FRA)	9	11–00	40/1	Wayne Hutchinson	Alan King	McNeill family
9		Balthazar King (IRE)	10	10–13	14/1	Richard Johnson	Philip Hobbs	The Brushmakers
10		Wayward Prince	10	10–13	66/1	Jack Doyle	Hilary Parrott	J. & H. Parrott
11		Mr. Moonshine (IRE)	10	10–12	20/1	Ryan Mania	Sue Smith	D. Pryde, J. Beaumont & D. van der Hoeven
12		Teaforthree (IRE)	10	10–12	10/1 JF	Nick Scholfield	Rebecca Curtis	Conyers, O'Reilly, Roddis, Zeffman
13		Across the Bay (IRE)	10	10–11	50/1	Henry Brooke	Donald McCain	Scotch Piper Syndicate
14		Double Seven (IRE)	8	10–11	10/1 JF	A. P. McCoy	Martin Brassil (IRE)	J. P. McManus
15		Battle Group	9	10–10	40/1	Brendan Powell	Johnny Farrelly	Jolly Boys Outing
16		Buckers Bridge (IRE)	8	10–10	66/1	Andrew Lynch	Henry de Bromhead (IRE)	A. & A. Potts
17		Líon Na Bearnaí (IRE)	12	10–10	33/1	Davy Russell	Tom Gibney (IRE)	The Lock Syndicate
18		Prince de Beauchene (FRA)	11	10–10	20/1	Paul Townend	Willie Mullins (IRE)	A. & G. Wylie
19		Monbeg Dude (IRE)	9	10–09	16/1	Paul Carberry	Michael Scudamore	Oydunow
20		Big Shu (IRE)	9	10–08	14/1	Peter Buchanan	Peter Maher (IRE)	H. Duffy/R. Robinson/C. Woods
21		Burton Port (IRE)	10	10–08	16/1	Brian Harding	Jonjo O'Neill	T. Hemmings
22		Our Father (IRE)	8	10–08	25/1	Denis O'Regan	David Pipe	Ives & Johnson families
23		Mountainous (IRE)	9	10–07	40/1	Jamie Moore	Richard Lee	Walters Plant Hire, J. & J. Potter
24		The Rainbow Hunter	10	10–07	25/1	Aidan Coleman	Kim Bailey	May We Never Be Found Out
25		Vintage Star (IRE)	8	10–07	50/1	Brian Hughes	Sue Smith	T. Hemmings
26		Chance Du Roy (FRA)	10	10–06	33/1	Tom O'Brien	Philip Hobbs	D. Du Pre
27		Hawkes Point	9	10–06	50/1	Ryan Mahon	Paul Nicholls	G. Roach
28		Kruzhlinin (GER)	7	10–06	100/1	Wilson Renwick	Donald McCain	P. & C. Rooney
29		Pineau De Re (FRA)	11	10–06	25/1	Leighton Aspell	Richard Newland	J. A. Provan
30		Golan Way	10	10–05	66/1	Michael Byrne	Tim Vaughan	W R B Racing 58
31		Twirling Magnet (IRE)	8	10–05	100/1	Richie McLernon	Jonjo O'Neill	G. Smith
32		Vesper Bell (IRE)	8	10–05	40/1	Katie Walsh	Willie Mullins (IRE)	S. Ricci
33		The Package	11	10–04	14/1	Tom Scudamore	David Pipe	Johnson family
34		Raz De Maree (IRE)	9	10–03	50/1	David Condon	Dessie Hughes (IRE)	J. J. Swan
35		Rose of the Moon (IRE)	9	10–03	50/1	Jake Greenall	David O'Meara	Middleham Park Racing XXXIII & Ptrs
36		Shakalakaboomboom (IRE)	10	10–03	16/1	David Bass	Nicky Henderson	L. Breslin
37		Alvarado (IRE)	9	10–02	33/1	Paul Moloney	Fergal O'Brien	W. & A. Rucker
38		Last Time D'Albain (FRA)	10	10–02	50/1	Robbie Colgan	Liam Cusack (IRE)	Fontstown Syndicate
39		One in a Milan (IRE)	9	10–02	40/1	Adam Wedge	Evan Williams	P. Langford
40		Swing Bill (FRA)	13	10–01	66/1	Conor O'Farrell	David Pipe	Halewood Int Ltd

- Great Britain unless stated.
- Amateur jockeys denoted by preceding title, e.g. Mr.

== Race overview ==
Placed horses

1: Pineau de Re

2: Balthazar King

3: Double Seven

4: Alvarado

The race was due to go off at 4:15 pm on 5 April 2014 but a false start delayed the showpiece steeplechase. The starter Hugh Barclay got the field away at the second attempt, but Battle Group refused to race.

Twirling Magnet, Burton Port and Big Shu were fallers over the first three fences, before the Canal Turn claimed three further casualties. Another three fell at Valentine's, including the 12–1 shot Long Run. Teaforthree, who was sent off joint-favourite with Double Seven at 10/1, unseated his mount at The Chair.

Going onto the second circuit, 50/1 outsider Across the Bay held a strong lead until being all but carried out by the loose Tidal Bay before continuing almost tailed off. Shakalakaboomboom and Quito De La Roque were pulled up after the 20th and 21st fences respectively, then One in a Milan fell at Becher's Brook. Eighteen of the 39 runners made it over the final fence and on the long run-in to the finishing post Pineau de Re extended his lead over Balthazar King to win by five lengths. For Richard Johnson, aboard Balthazar King, this was his 18th attempt at the Grand National since his debut in the race in 1997, increasing an unwanted record for having taken most rides in the race without being victorious. A. P. McCoy finished third on Double Seven, and in doing so equalled Tom Olliver's 155-year record of having taken part in a record 19 Nationals. Alvarado was fourth and Rocky Creek came in fifth. Despite having been almost carried out, Across The Bay did complete the course, in 14th position.

The charity World Horse Welfare issued a statement after the race declaring that they were pleased with the positive effect the modifications of the course and strict guidelines laid down to riders had on the welfare of the horses; however, the stewards issued a 12-day riding ban to Jack Doyle, whom they judged should have pulled up when tailed off as his mount, Wayward Prince, appeared in an exhausted state before falling at the third-last fence. Jockeys had been told in their briefing before the race to pull up any horse that was tailed off with no serious chance of winning prize money, which is paid out to 10th place.

A stewards' inquiry was also called into the conduct of the jockeys at the start of the race, where it was claimed the welfare of assistant starter, Simon McNeill, who was knocked over but not injured, was compromised. While most of the 39 jockeys called to the inquiry initially attended, they all refused to return for a second inquiry after racing, issuing a statement in which they [the jockeys] had all agreed not to return to face the stewards as they were unhappy with the manner in which the inquiry was being conducted.

== Finishing order ==
Position	Horse	Jockey	SP	Distance	Prize money
1st	Pineau De Re	Leighton Aspell	25/1	Won by 5 lengths	£561,300
2nd	Balthazar King	Richard Johnson	14/1	1 1/4 lengths	£211,100
3rd	Double Seven	A. P. McCoy	10/1 JF	10 lengths	£105,500
4th	Alvarado	Paul Moloney	33/1	2 1/2 lengths	£52,700
5th	Rocky Creek	Noel Fehily	16/1	Short head	£26,500
6th	Chance Du Roy	Tom O'Brien	33/1	3 lengths	£13,200
7th	Monbeg Dude	Paul Carberry	16/1	16 lengths	£6,800
8th	Raz De Maree	Davy Condon	50/1	Short head	£3,600
9th	Swing Bill	Conor O'Farrell	66/1	4 1/2 lengths	£2,000
10th	Kruzhlinin	Wilson Renwick	100/1	2 1/2 lengths	£1,000
11th	Buckers Bridge	Andrew Lynch	66/1	18 lengths	
12th	The Package	Tom Scudamore	14/1	6 lengths	
13th	Vesper Bell	Katie Walsh	40/1	2 lengths	
14th	Across The Bay	Henry Brooke	50/1	7 lengths	
15th	Mr. Moonshine	Ryan Mania	20/1	37 lengths	
16th	Prince De Beauchene	Paul Townend	20/1	33 lengths	
17th	Hunt Ball	Andrew Tinkler	50/1	1 length	
18th	Hawkes Point	Ryan Mahon	50/1	Last to complete	

== Non-finishers ==
Fence	Horse	Jockey	SP	Fate
Start line	Battle Group	Brendan Powell	40/1	Refused to start
1	Twirling Magnet	Richie McLernon	100/1	Fell
2	Burton Port	Brian Harding	16/1	Unseated rider
3 (open ditch)	Big Shu	Peter Buchanan	14/1	Fell
6 (Becher's Brook)	Last Time D'Albain	Robbie Colgan	50/1	Unseated rider
8 (Canal Turn)	Tidal Bay	Sam Twiston-Davies	16/1	Unseated rider
8 (Canal Turn)	Our Father	Denis O'Regan	25/1	Unseated rider
8 (Canal Turn)	Golan Way	Michael Byrne	66/1	Fell
9 (Valentine's)	Long Run	Mr. Sam Waley-Cohen	12/1	Fell
9 (Valentine's)	Mountainous	Jamie Moore	40/1	Fell
9 (Valentine's)	The Rainbow Hunter	Aidan Coleman	25/1	Unseated rider
15 (The Chair)	Teaforthree	Nick Scholfield	10/1 JF	Unseated rider
20	Shakalakaboomboom	David Bass	16/1	Pulled up
21	Quito De La Roque	Brian O'Connell	40/1	Pulled up
22 (Becher's Brook)	One in a Milan	Adam Wedge	40/1	Fell
22 (Becher's Brook)	Triolo D'Alene	Barry Geraghty	16/1	Pulled up
25 (Valentine's)	Colbert Station	Mark Walsh	33/1	Pulled up
26	Rose of the Moon	Jake Greenall	50/1	Fell
26	Vintage Star	Brian Hughes	50/1	Pulled up
27 (open ditch)	Líon Na Bearnaí	Davy Russell	33/1	Pulled up
28 (ditch)	Wayward Prince	Jack Doyle	66/1	Fell
29	Walkon	Wayne Hutchinson	33/1	Pulled up

== Broadcasting and media ==
Pineau De Re and Leighton Aspell, chased hard by Balthazar King and Richard Johnson and by Double Seven and AP McCoy. But at the elbow, it's Pineau De Re by six lengths. Inside the final furlong, Balthazar King, and after him Double Seven as they race up towards the line. Pineau De Re, the 11-year-old for trainer, Dr Richard Newland and Leighton Aspell is going to take out the Crabbie's Grand National! Pineau De Re wins, Balthazar King second, Double Seven third.

— Channel 4 lead commentator Simon Holt describes the climax of the race.

As the Grand National is accorded the status of an event of national interest in the United Kingdom and is listed on the Ofcom Code on Sports and Other Listed and Designated Events, it must be shown on free-to-air terrestrial television in the UK. The race was broadcast live on TV by Channel 4, entering the second of their four-year deal for the race.

Clare Balding and Nick Luck presented Channel 4's coverage, supported by Jim McGrath, Mick Fitzgerald and Graham Cunningham. Reports were provided by Rishi Persad and Alice Plunkett and betting updates by Tanya Stevenson and Brian Gleeson. The commentary team was by Richard Hoiles, Ian Bartlett and Simon Holt, who called the winner home for the second time. After the race, Rishi Persad, Mick Fitzgerald and Richard Hoiles guided the viewers through a detailed re-run of the race. Channel 4 aimed its build-up to the race at the once-a-year punter rather than the dedicated racing fan with a special broadcast of its Sunday magazine show Sunday Brunch, as a Grand National Special Weekend Brunch, which included outside broadcast from Aintree.

Racing UK televised the race into bookmakers around the UK and Ireland.

The BBC continued an unbroken run of 82 consecutive renewals of the race to be broadcast live on radio, dating back to 1927. The race was part of its Saturday Sport 5 Live broadcast, presented by Mark Pougatch with pre-race build-up from former National riders Andrew Thornton and Luke Harvey. Cornelius Lysaght interviewed connections in the ring and Rob Nothman provided market updates. The commentary team for the race itself was Malcolm Tomlinson, Darren Owen, Gary O'Brien and John Hunt, who called the finish.

The Grand National also continued to move rapidly into new media with the majority of betting on the race taking place with online bookmakers. In addition to this, broadcaster Channel 4 provided an online app that could be downloaded for backers to track their runner during the race.

== See also ==
- Horseracing in Great Britain
- List of British National Hunt races
