= Ulster Grand National =

Steeplechase horse race in Northern Ireland

The Ulster National, officially the Randox Ulster National, referred to as the Ulster Grand National, and sometimes the Northern Ireland Grand National, is a National Hunt steeplechase in Northern Ireland which is open to horses aged five years or older. It is run at Downpatrick over a distance of about 3 miles and 4½ furlongs (~5,733 meters), and during its running there are sixteen fences to be jumped. It is a handicap race, and it is scheduled to take place each year in late March to early April.

It is the opener for the most prestigious grand nationals, which is followed by the Irish Grand National. It is the Northern Ireland equivalent of the Grand National and is held during Downpatrick's most prestigious race meeting of the year and attracts large crowds.

== History ==
The first Ulster Grand National took place on 17 May 1939. The inaugural winner was Ballyhooley, which won priced at 25/1, and was owned by Mr. Dick Sheehan. The jockey to ride Ballyhooley to the historic finish was E Kennedy.

The Ulster Grand National ran into trouble two years into its existence, when the 1941 edition was cancelled due to a spread of foot-and-mouth disease.

From 1942 to 1944 the race was not held due to World War II.

In 1945, the return of the Ulster National was won by Caughoo. Caughoo became the first horse to retain the Ulster National, winning it again in 1946. Caughoo is one of the most famous horses to win the Ulster National, as he went on to win the 1947 Grand National at a price of 100/1.

In April 1962, the Queen Mother visited Downpatrick, and watched her horse Laffy win the Ulster National. This occurred following the disqualification of Connkehely, and Laffy was then announced as the winner.

In 2013, the Ulster National was won by Pineau De Re, the French-bred horse went on to win the 2014 Grand National.

In 2020, despite the outbreak of the COVID-19 Pandemic, the race still took place. It was won by Space Cadet. The horse won by two lengths with a 25/1 victory.

== See also ==
- Ulster Derby
- Scottish Grand National
- Irish Grand National
- Welsh Grand National
- List of Irish National Hunt races
