= Prelude Handicap Hurdle =

Hurdle horse race in Britain

Prelude Handicap Hurdle
2026
Un Sens A La Vie	Morning Mayhem	Crooked Path

Previous years
2025
Saligo Bay	Sir Galahad	Rock On Pedro
2024
Saint Riquier	Got Grey	Allmankind
2023
Liverpool Knight	Castel Gandolfo	Chance A Tune
2022
Mandocello	Kihavah	Pisgah Pike
2021
Valentino Dancer	Hang In There	Blakeney Point

2020-2011
2020
Marine One	Pisgah Pike	Strong Glance
2019
Scarlet Dragon	Earlofthecotswolds	Gumball
2018
Caius Marcius	Theclockisticking	Political Policy
2017
Listen To The Man	Hello Sweetie	Caid Du Lin
2016
Hassle	Kapstadt	Wisty
2015
Cloonacool	Queen Alphabet	Swansea Mile
2014
Exitas	Purple 'n Gold	Odin
2013
Ahyaknowyerself	Orthodox Lad	Prompter
2012
Local Hero	Laudatory	Kayaan
2011
Rumble Of Thunder	King In Waiting	Rajnagan

2010-2007
2010
Palomar	Tarkari	Astracad
2009
Treaty Flyer	Quasar D'oudairies	Hibiki
2008
Katies Tuitor	Riguez Dancer	Truckers Delight
2007
Scutch Mill	Mr Shambles	Storm of Applause

The Prelude Handicap Hurdle is a National Hunt hurdle race in Great Britain which is open to horses aged three years or older. It is run at Market Rasen over a distance of about 2 miles and 110 yards (3,319 metres), and it is scheduled to take place each year in September.

The race was first run in 2007 and was awarded Listed status in 2011. It was downgraded to Class 2 status from the 2021 running.

== Winners ==
Year	Winner	Age	Weight	Jockey	Trainer
2007	Scutch Mill	5	10-06	Barry Keniry	Patrick Haslam
2008	Katies Tuitor	5	11-12	Noel Fehily	Charlie Mann
2009	Treaty Flyer	8	10-06	Johnny Farrelly	Alison Thorpe
2010	Palomar	8	10-13	Fearghal Davis	Brian Ellison
2011	Rumble Of Thunder	5	10-09	Richie McGrath	Kate Walton
2012	Local Hero	5	11-12	Paul Bohan	Steve Gollings
2013	Ahyaknowyerself	7	11-04	Sam Twiston-Davies	Richard Newland
2014	Exitas	6	10-00	Conor Shoemark	Phil Middleton
2015	Cloonacool	6	10-04	Paddy Brennan	Stuart Edmunds
2016	Hassle	7	11-00	Charlie Hammond	Richard Newland
2017	Listen To The Man	7	10-13	Ian Popham	Dan Skelton
2018	Caius Marcius	7	10-03	Brian Hughes	Nicky Richards
2019	Scarlet Dragon	6	10-06	Wayne Hutchinson	Alan King
2020	Marine One	6	09-13	Cillin Leonard	Richard Newland
2021	Valentino Dancer	6	10-02	Paddy Brennan	Fergal O'Brien
2022	Mandocello	6	10-13	Ciaran Gethings	Stuart Edmunds
2023	Liverpool Knight	4	11-05	Sean Bowen	Olly Murphy
2024	Saint Riquier	6	10-08	C J Todd	Ian Williams
2025	Saligo Bay	7	10-02	Jonathan England	Sam England
2026	Un Sens A La Vie	6	11-05	Sam Twiston-Davies	Nigel & Willy Twiston-Davies

== See also ==
- Horse racing in Great Britain
- List of British National Hunt races
