= Leighton Aspell =

Irish jockey

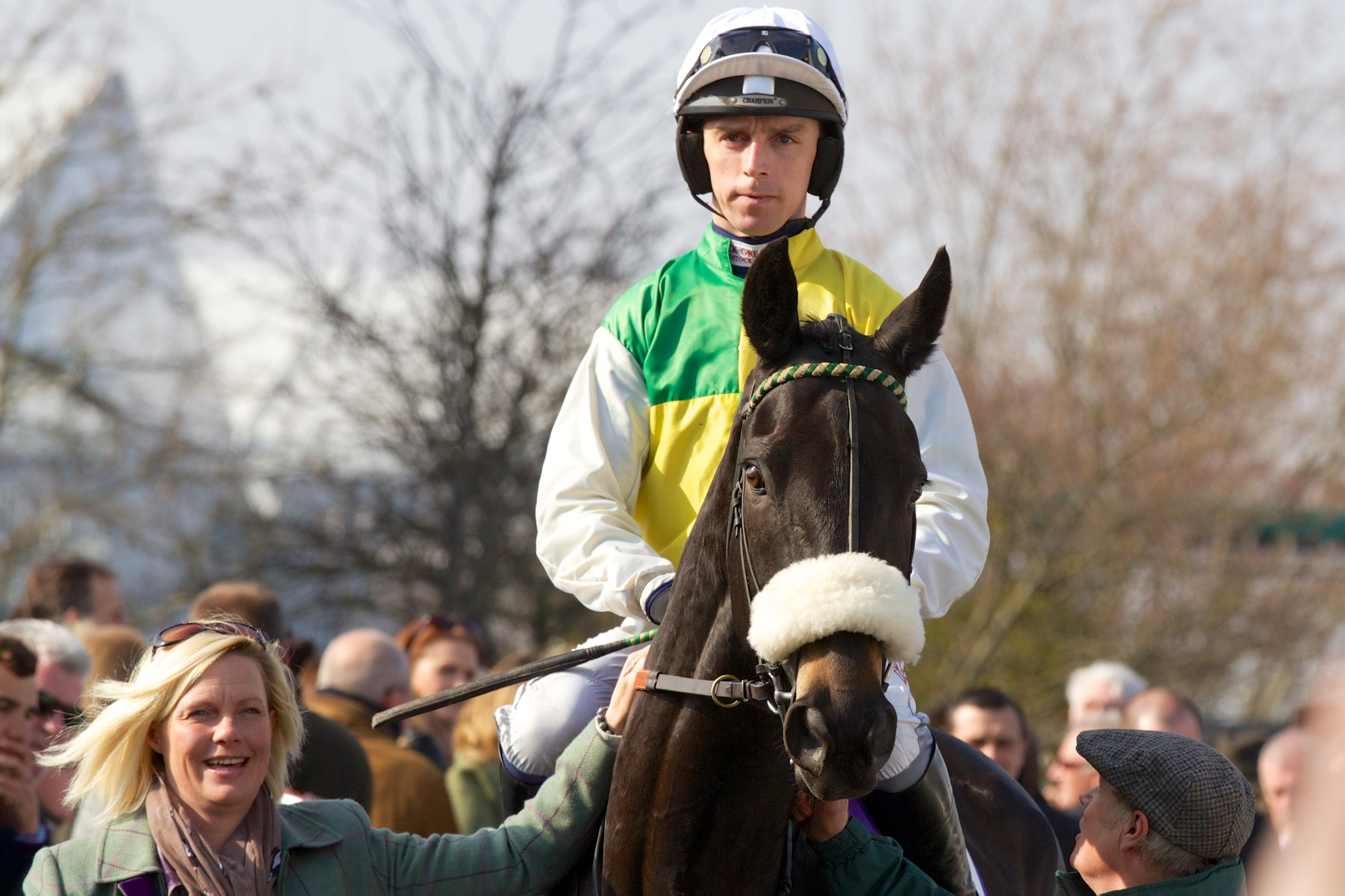
- Leighton Aspell riding Many Clouds, the horse with which he won the Grand National

Personal information
- Born: 12 June 1976 (age 50) Dublin, Ireland
- Occupation: Jockey
- Spouse: Nicola Aspell
- Children: 3

Horse racing career
- Sport: Horse racing
- Career winnings: £9,422,664.00
- Career wins: 911

Major racing wins
- Welsh National (2001, 2005); Champion Four Year Old Hurdle (2005); Grand National (2014, 2015); Hennessy Gold Cup (2014)

Significant horses
- United, Pineau de Re, Many Clouds

Leighton Aspell (born 12 June 1976) is a retired Irish jockey, best known for winning both the 2014 and 2015 Grand National's riding Pineau de Re and Many Clouds

== Personal life ==
Leighton Aspell was born 12 June 1976 in Dublin, Ireland. He grew up in Narraghmore, County Kildare. Aspell has a brother, Paddy, who is also a jockey, and was originally taught to ride by his father, Patrick. Aspell has a fan club, making him "one of the few jockeys" to have such a thing. He and his brother Paddy are second cousins of former Ireland Rugby international Shane Horgan and his actress sister Sharon Horgan. His niece is actress and equestrian show jumper Lilly Aspell.

== Career ==
Aged 16, Aspell moved from Ireland to Great Britain and joined Reg Hollinshead as an apprentice following in the footsteps of Pat Eddery, Kevin Darley and Walter Swinburn. Initially competing as a flat jockey, Aspell's first win was Prime Painter trained by Roger Fisher at Hamilton Park in May 1993. He later moved to Sussex to join Josh Gifford at Findon switching to National Hunt riding. His first winner over fences was Karar, trained by Richard Rowe in a Novices Handicap Hurdle at Huntingdon Racecourse in May 1995. Aspell won the December Novices Chase at Lingfield Park in December 1996 onboard Foodbroker Star for Gifford.

Aspell continued working closely with Gifford, Peter Bowen and Pat Murphy. It would be for Murphy that he won his first Welsh Grand National for in December 2001 riding Supreme Glory, finishing ahead of Bindaree who would go on to win the Grand National at Aintree the following April. Aspell also won the 2005 Welsh Grand National with L'Aventure for Paul Nicholls.

2005 would also mark Aspell's only Grade 1 victory in the Champion Four Year Old Hurdle at Punchestown Racecourse for trainer Lucy Wadham riding United. Aspell and United would later win the National Spirit Hurdle at Fontwell Park.

In July 2007, Aspell announced his retirement from race riding, and left to work for trainer John Dunlop in Arundel. 18 months later, Aspell returned to race riding.

A strong start to the 2013/14 season saw Aspell win several key races including the Persian War Novices Chase and the December Novices Chase. At the turn of the year, victories for Emma Lavelle and Oliver Sherwood in two feature races at Warwick - the Classic Chase and Leamington Novices Hurdle led to him securing the ride on Pineau de Re in the 2014 Grand National for trainer Richard Newland. The horse's regular rider Sam Twiston-Davies opted to ride the more fancied Tidal Bay around three weeks prior to the race. After a false start, Aspell and Pineau de Re won the race by five lengths at odds of 25/1.

Heading into the 2014/15 season saw Aspell form a close relationship with Many Clouds riding for Sherwood in the colours of owner Trevor Hemmings. Wins in the Hennessey Gold Cup and Cotswold Chase were chalked up on the way to Aintree where Aspell won his second Grand National, recording the first back-to-back wins for a jockey in the race since the 1970s by Red Rum jockey Brian Fletcher.

In February 2020, Aspell retired from racing riding almost 1,000 winners.

== Major wins ==
(United Kingdom) Great Britain

- Grand National – (2) Pineau de Re (2014), Many Clouds (2015)
- Welsh Grand National – (2) Supreme Glory (2001), L'Aventure (2005)

(Republic of Ireland) Ireland

- Champion Four Year Old Hurdle – (1) United (2005)
