= Summer Handicap Hurdle =

Hurdle horse race in Britain

Summer Hurdle
2026
High Fibre	Indemnity	Squeezebox

Previous years
2025
Cavern Club	Kihavah	Nibras Gold
2024
Castel Gandolfo	Kihavah	Magical Maggie
2023
Too Friendly	Castel Gandolfo	Glorious Zoff
2022
Pisgah Pike	Castel Gandolfo	Wolf Prince
2021
Stonific	Hang In There	Valentino Dancer

2020-2011
2020
Red Force One	Fair Mountain	Caius Marcius
2019
Grapevine	Legal History	Ingleby Hollow
2018
L'inganno Felice	Fair Mountain	Cubswin
2017
John Constable	Red Tornado	Kapstadt
2016
Red Tornado	Minellaforleisure	Gwafa
2015
Gran Maestro	Hammersly Lake	Manhattan Swing
2014
Purple Bay	Max Ward	Slim Pickens
2013
Sea Lord	Coffee	Roman Flight
2012
Local Hero	Kian's Delight	Kayaan
2011
Viva Colonia	Kylenoe Fairy	Street Entertainer

2010-2001
2010
Australia Day	Gloucester	Stage Acclaim
2009
Cootehill	Danehill Willy	Ameeq
2008
Katies Tuitor	Advancement	Swordsman
2007
Kings Quay	Prince Ary	Ellerslie Tom
2006
Tycoon Hall	Wee Dinns	Portavadie
2005
Buena Vista	Hilltime	Borora
2004
Alrida	Wet Lips	Torrid Kentavr
2003
Italian Counsel	Showpiece	Cosmic Case
2002
Puntal	Loop The Loup	Cotopaxi
2001
Magic Combination	Whistling Dixie	Saragann

2000-1995
2000
Aerleon Pete	Shalaal	Sawlajan
1999
Eden Dancer	Lady Confess	Normanby Road
1998
Call My Guest	George Dillingham	Indian Jockey
1997
Kinnescash	Sarmatian	Welsh Mill
1996
Mister Drum	Suivez	Magslad
1995
Monty Royale	Distant Echo	The Premier Express

The Summer Handicap Hurdle is a National Hunt hurdle race in Great Britain which is open to horses aged three years or older. It is run at Market Rasen over a distance of about 2 miles and half a furlong (2 miles and 148 yards, or 3,354 metres), and it is scheduled to take place each year in late July.

The race was first run in 1995 as the Summer Festival Handicap Hurdle. It was awarded Listed status in 2008 but was downgraded as of 2020. The distance of the race was reduced from 2m 1½f to 2m ½f in 2010.

== Records ==
Leading jockey since 1995 (3 wins):

- Denis O'Regan – Australia Day (2010), Viva Colonia (2011), Sea Lord (2013)

Leading trainer since 1995 (3 wins):

- Martin Pipe – Eden Dancer (1999), Puntal (2002), Buena Vista (2005)

== Winners ==
Year	Winner	Age	Weight	Jockey	Trainer
1995	Monty Royale	6	10-01	Richard Johnson	Noel Chance
1996	Mister Drum	7	11-04	Mark Dwyer	Jumbo Wilkinson
1997	Kinnescash	4	10-08	Richard Dunwoody	Peter Bowen
1998	Call My Guest	8	10-13	Mick Fitzgerald	Ray Peacock
1999	Eden Dancer	7	10-00	Chris Maude	Martin Pipe
2000	Aerleon Pete	6	11-04	Charlie Swan	Christy Roche
2001	Magic Combination	8	11-04	Tony Dobbin	Len Lungo
2002	Puntal	6	11-10	Tony McCoy	Martin Pipe
2003	Italian Counsel	6	10-00	Derek Laverty	Luke Dace
2004	Alrida	5	10-00	Richie McGrath	Richard Fahey
2005	Buena Vista	4	11-07	Tony McCoy	Martin Pipe
2006	Tycoon Hall	6	10-02	Tom O'Brien	Peter Bowen
2007	Kings Quay	5	10-09	Dougie Costello	John Quinn
2008	Katies Tuitor	5	11-03	Noel Fehily	Charlie Mann
2009	Cootehill	5	10-00	Paddy Brennan	Nigel Twiston-Davies
2010	Australia Day	7	11-05	Denis O'Regan	Paul Webber
2011	Viva Colonia	6	11-00	Denis O'Regan	David O'Meara
2012	Local Hero	5	11-04	Paul Bohan	Steve Gollings
2013	Sea Lord	6	11-01	Denis O'Regan	John Ferguson
2014	Purple Bay	5	11-04	Mikey Ennis	John Ferguson
2015	Gran Maestro	6	10-01	Will Kennedy	Dr. Richard Newland
2016	Red Tornado	4	10-09	Harry Skelton	Dan Skelton
2017	John Constable	6	11-12	Davy Russell	Evan Williams
2018	L'Inganno Felice	8	11-02	Ross Chapman	Iain Jardine
2019	Grapevine	6	09-09	Connor Brace	Sophie Leech
2020	Red Force One	5	10-12	Harry Cobden	Paul Nicholls
2021	Stonific	8	10-09	Tom Scudamore	David O'Meara
2022	Pisgah Pike	7	11-06	Gavin Sheehan	Jamie Snowden
2023	Too Friendly	5	11-10	Harry Cobden	James Owen
2024	Castel Gandolfo	7	10-13	Jonathan Burke	Fergal O'Brien
2025	Cavern Club	5	10-11	Gavin Sheehan	James Owen
2026	High Fibre	7	10-07	Sean Bowen	James Owen

== See also ==
- Horse racing in Great Britain
- List of British National Hunt races
