= Summer Plate =

Steeplechase horse race in Britain

Summer Plate
2026
| Queensbury Boy | Kingston Narcissus | Breizh River |

Previous years
2025
Ballysax Hank | Courtland | Bhaloo
2024
Sure Touch | Soul Icon | Statuario
2023
Born Famous | Courtland | Hang In There
2022
Francky Du Berlais | La Domaniale | Statuario
2021
Francky Du Berlais | Exelerator Express | Pink Eyed Pedro

2020-2011
2020
Really Super | Fidux | Solomon Grey
2019
Casablanca Mix | Royal Village | Van Gogh Du Granit
2018
More Buck's | Too Many Diamonds | Shantou Village
2017
Alcala | Wadswick Court | Shelford
2016
Long House Hall | Ballynagour | Theinval
2015
Brave Spartacus | Baby Mix | Valco De Touzaine
2014
It's A Gimme | Lost Legend | Mazuri Cowboy
2013
Bobowen | Woolcombe Folly | Finger Onthe Pulse
2012
I Have Dreamed | Al Co | Qulinton
2011
Qulinton | Logans Run | Pilgrims Lane

2010-2001
2010
Grand Slam Hero | Putney Bridge | King Troy
2009
Nostringsattached | Keepitsecret | No Panic
2008
Snoopy Loopy | Brooklyn Brownie | William Butler
2007
Iron Man | Hoo La Baloo | It Takes Time
2006
Yes Sir | Ballycassidy | Mr Fluffy
2005
Tango Royal | Impek | Ballycassidy
2004
Glinger | Colca Canyon | Wuxi Venture
2003
Ballycassidy | Ei Ei | Il Capitano
2002
Chicuelo | Star Jack | Logician
2001
Dorans Gold | Royal Predica | Toskano

2000-1995
2000
Foundry Lane | Gladiateur | Manhattan Castle
1999
Fleeting Mandate | The Gopher | Stately Home
1998
Saskia's Hero | Time Won't Wait | Scottish Bambi
1997
Stately Home | Weaver George | Super Coin
1996
Bobby Socks | Wise Approach | Sword Beach
1995
Mils Mij | Sohail | Stepfaster

The Summer Plate is a Premier Handicap National Hunt chase in Great Britain which is open to horses aged four years or older. It is run at Market Rasen over a distance of about 2 miles and 5½ furlongs (2 miles 5 furlongs and 89 yards, or 4,306 metres), and it is scheduled to take place each year in late July.

The race was first run in 1995 as the Summer Festival Handicap Chase, it was awarded Listed status in 2005 and the distance was increased from 2m 3f to 2m 5½f. The race was upgraded to Grade 3 in 2020 and was re-classified as a Premier Handicap from the 2023 running when Grade 3 status was renamed by the British Horseracing Authority.

== Winners ==
| Year | Winner | Age | Weight | Jockey | Trainer |
|---|---|---|---|---|---|
| 1995 | Mils Mij | 10 | 11–03 | Peter Niven | Thomas Cuthbert |
| 1996 | Bobby Socks | 10 | 10–08 | Richard Johnson | Richard Lee |
| 1997 | Stately Home | 6 | 12–00 | Norman Williamson | Peter Bowen |
| 1998 | Saskia's Hero | 11 | 10–00 | Derek Byrne | James Hetherton |
| 1999 | Fleeting Mandate | 7 | 10–13 | Dean Gallagher | Paul Webber |
| 2000 | Foundry Lane | 9 | 11–03 | Anthony Ross | Mary Reveley |
| 2001 | Dorans Gold | 7 | 10–00 | Timmy Murphy | Paul Nicholls |
| 2002 | Chicuelo | 6 | 10–04 | Tony McCoy | Martin Pipe |
| 2003 | Ballycassidy | 7 | 10–13 | Barry Geraghty | Peter Bowen |
| 2004 | Glinger | 11 | 10–02 | Brian Harding | Nicky Richards |
| 2005 | Tango Royal | 9 | 10–08 | T J Malone | Martin Pipe |
| 2006 | Yes Sir | 7 | 10-10 | Tony McCoy | Peter Bowen |
| 2007 | Iron Man | 6 | 10–13 | Paddy Merrigan | Peter Bowen |
| 2008 | Snoopy Loopy | 10 | 11–02 | Seamus Durack | Peter Bowen |
| 2009 | Nostringsattached | 8 | 11–05 | Tony McCoy | Jonjo O'Neill |
| 2010 | Grand Slam Hero | 9 | 10–09 | Graham Lee | Nigel Twiston-Davies |
| 2011 | Qulinton | 7 | 11–04 | Conor O'Farrell | David Pipe |
| 2012 | I Have Dreamed | 10 | 10–07 | David Bass | Mrs Lawney Hill |
| 2013 | Bobowen | 7 | 10–06 | Sam Twiston-Davies | Richard Newland |
| 2014 | It's A Gimme | 7 | 11–01 | Tony McCoy | Jonjo O'Neill |
| 2015 | Brave Spartacus | 9 | 10–12 | James Reveley | Keith Reveley |
| 2016 | Long House Hall | 8 | 10–12 | Harry Skelton | Dan Skelton |
| 2017 | Alcala | 7 | 11–07 | Sam Twiston-Davies | Paul Nicholls |
| 2018 | More Buck's | 8 | 10–05 | Sean Bowen | Peter Bowen |
| 2019 | Casablanca Mix | 7 | 11–06 | Nico de Boinville | Nicky Henderson |
| 2020 | Really Super | 6 | 10–04 | Jack Quinlan | Amy Murphy |
| 2021 | Francky Du Berlais | 8 | 10–13 | James Bowen | Peter Bowen |
| 2022 | Francky Du Berlais | 9 | 12–00 | James Bowen | Peter Bowen |
| 2023 | Born Famous | 6 | 10–03 | Harry Cobden | Iain Jardine |
| 2024 | Sure Touch | 8 | 11–13 | Harry Cobden | Olly Murphy |
| 2025 | Ballysax Hank | 6 | 10-05 | Harry Cobden | Gavin Cromwell |
| 2026 | Queensbury Boy | 7 | 10-12 | James Bowen | Mikey Bowen |

== See also ==
- Horse racing in Great Britain
- List of British National Hunt races
