= Hunt Ball =

Irish-bred Thoroughbred racehorse

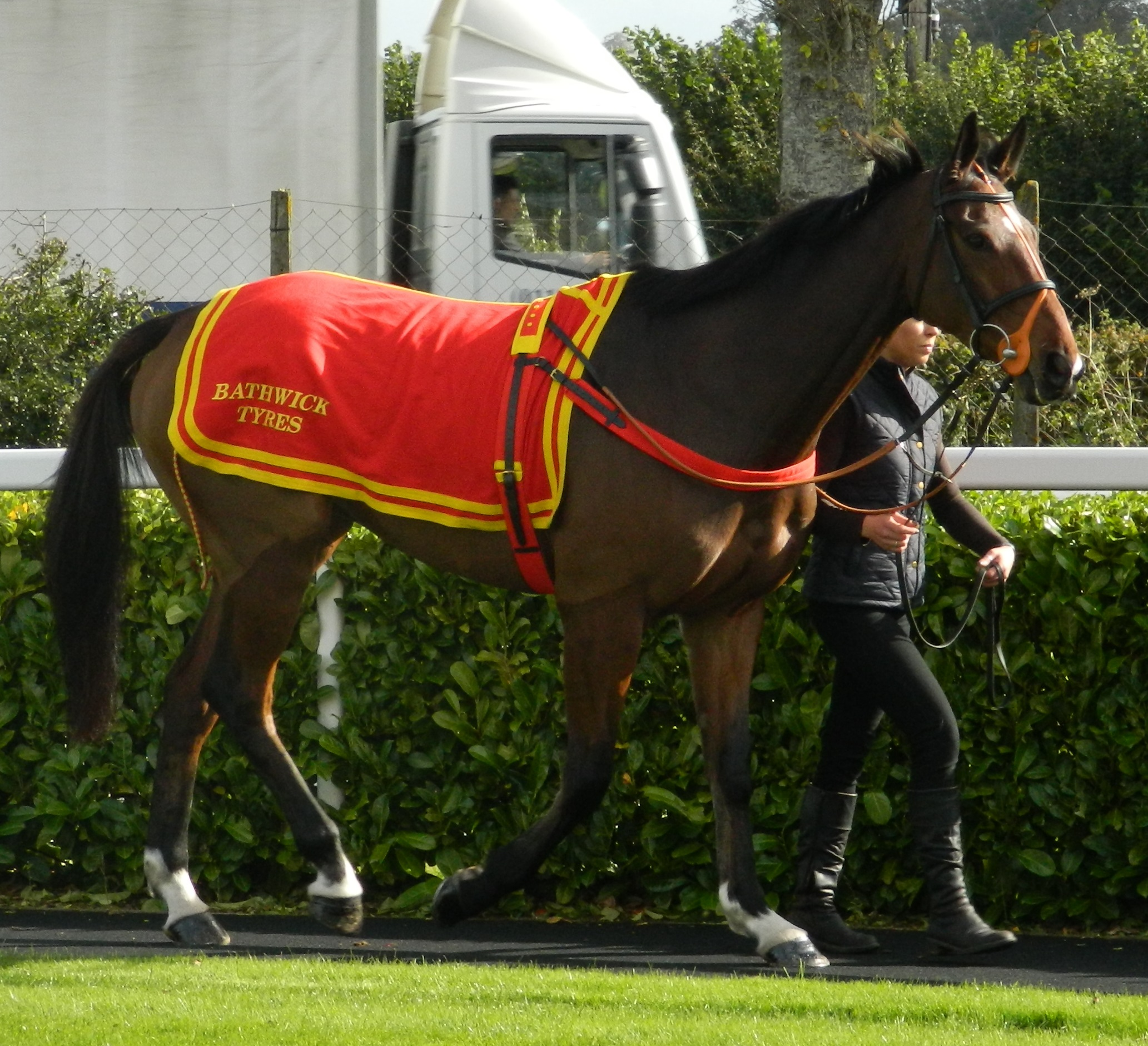
- Hunt Ball parading at Wincanton (October 2012)
- Sire: Winged Love
- Grandsire: In The Wings
- Dam: La Fandango
- Damsire: Taufan
- Sex: Gelding
- Foaled: 11 March 2005
- Country: Ireland
- Colour: Bay
- Breeder: Michael Slevin
- Owner: Atlantic Equine
- Trainer: Nicky Henderson; Keiran Burke
- Record: 25: 8-2-4
- Earnings: £161,648

Major wins
- Centenary Novices' Handicap Chase (2012)

Awards
- Special Achievement Award (Racehorse Owners Association’s 31st Horseracing Awards)

Hunt Ball (foaled on 11 March 2005) is a popular Thoroughbred racehorse. He was bred in Ireland and originally trained in Great Britain. His most noted success to date was winning the Centenary Novices' Handicap Chase at the Cheltenham Festival on 13 March 2012.

== Background ==
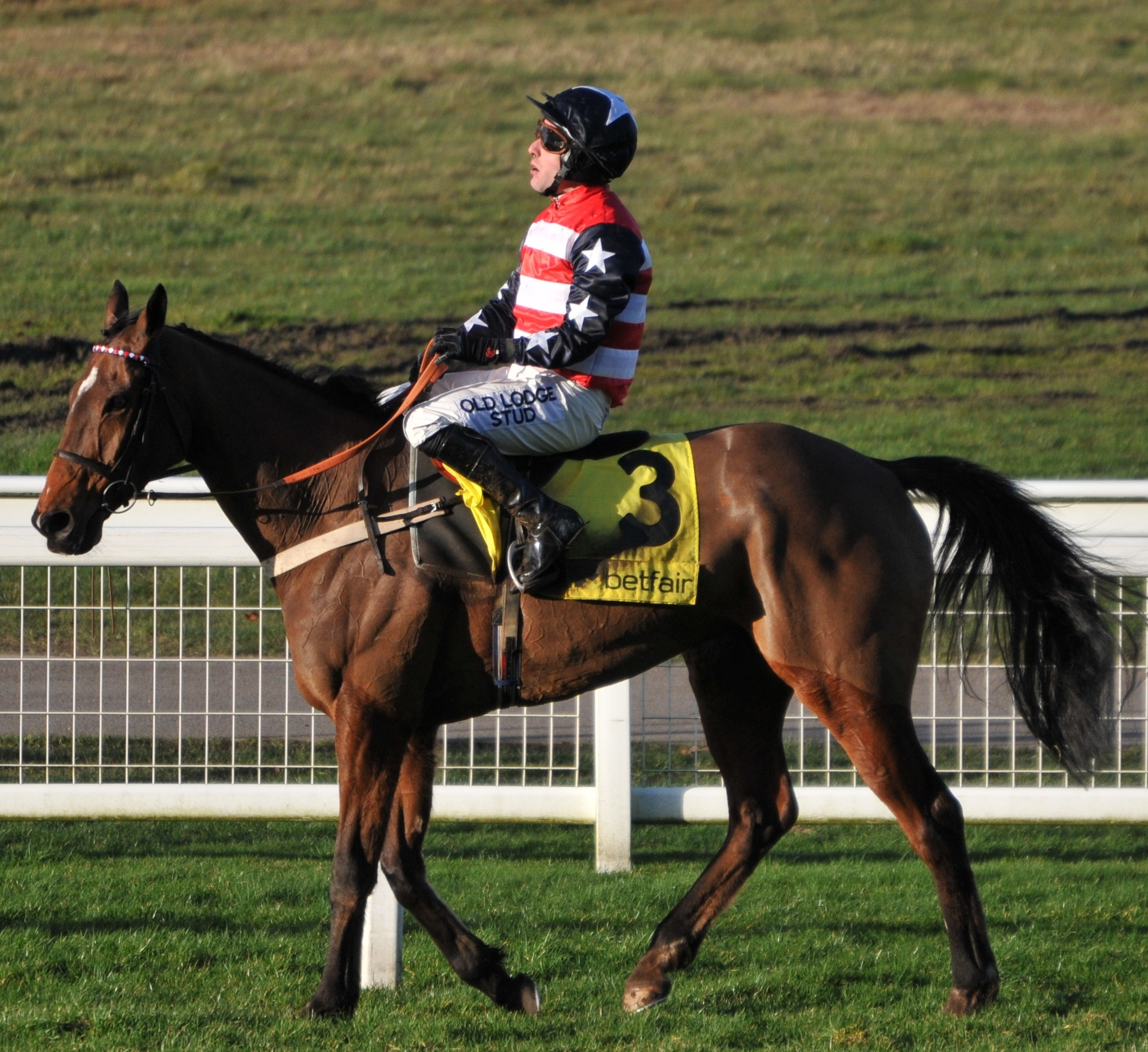
Hunt Ball after the Betfair Ascot Chase (February 2014)

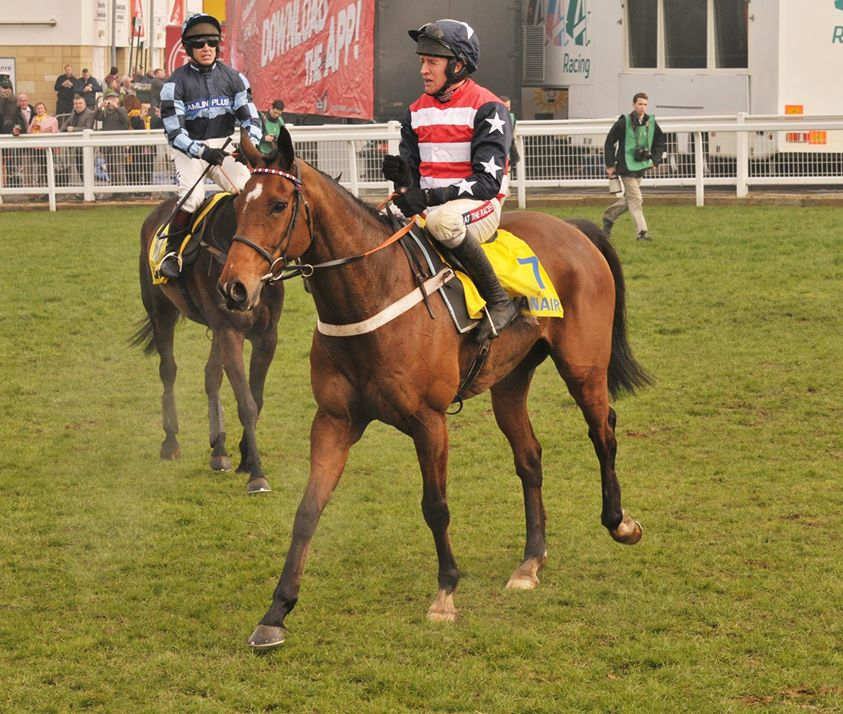
Hunt Ball after the Ryanair Chase at Cheltenham Festival (March 2014)

Between November 2011 and March 2012, Hunt Ball, trained by Keiran Burke, shot to fame with a significant rise through the handicap ranks and a weight increase in excess of 80lbs. He won seven races and climbed from a mark of 69 to 154, culminating in victory in the Pulteney Land Investments Novices’ Handicap Chase at the Cheltenham Festival, which cemented his popularity amongst racing fans. He was sent off the 13/2 favourite and raced prominently under his regular rider Nick Scholfield. He was pulled out of the pack and led the field just after 2 out before storming clear to win.

Hunt Ball went on to win Taunton's richest-ever prize on 4 April 2013 after finishing second in the Grade 2 Peterborough Chase and third in the Grade 2 Argento Chase.

Hunt Ball won a total of 8 races while in training with Kieran Burke, but his then-owner Anthony Knott agreed to a private sale of the horse to Atlantic Equine, an American-based syndicate run by Nick Carter and business partner Stephen Price. Hunt Ball left the UK for the US on 24 May 2013, where he joined the stable of Jonathan E. Sheppard.

After four unsuccessful attempts over American obstacles and with a final run in the Breeders' Cup Grand National Steeplechase at Far Hills, it was decided that Hunt Ball would return to England and join the yard of three-time British jump racing Champion Trainer Nicky Henderson while still racing for Atlantic Equine.

Hunt Ball's first run back in the UK yielded a 3rd place in the Grade 1 Betfair Ascot Chase in February 2014 followed by a 4th in the Grade 1 Ryanair Chase at the Cheltenham Festival.

His penultimate run for the 2013/2014 season was in the Crabbies Grand National where he finished 17th, having raced well for much of the 4m 3f. Hunt Ball chased the leaders until 3 fences out only to tire over the marathon trip. He finished the season at Sandown, finishing 3rd in the Bet365 Oaksey Chase.
