= Winged Love =

Irish-bred Thoroughbred racehorse

- Racing colours of Sheikh Mohammed
- Sire: In The Wings
- Grandsire: Sadler's Wells
- Dam: J'ai Deux Amours
- Damsire: Top Ville
- Sex: Stallion
- Foaled: 15 April 1992
- Country: Ireland
- Colour: Bay
- Breeder: Eric Puerari
- Owner: Sheikh Mohammed
- Trainer: André Fabre
- Record: 9: 3-2-2
- Earnings: £442,148

Major wins
- Prix de Suresnes (1995); Irish Derby (1995)

Winged Love (15 April 1992 – 24 May 2015) was an Irish-bred, French-trained Thoroughbred racehorse and sire best known for his win in the 1995 Irish Derby. After winning one of his two races as a juvenile in 1994, the colt showed steady improvement in the early part of his three-year-old season, finishing second in his first two races before winning the Listed Prix de Suresnes. He finished a close third behind Celtic Swing in the Prix du Jockey Club before reversing the form to win the Irish Derby. He went on to finish fourth in the King George VI and Queen Elizabeth Stakes and third in the Prix Niel and was retired from racing at the end of the year. He has subsequently become a successful sire of National Hunt horses.

== Background ==
Winged Love is a bay horse with a narrow white blaze and four white feet bred in Ireland by the bloodstock agent Eric Puerari. He was sired by In the Wings, a son of Sadler's Wells whose wins included the Coronation Cup, the Grand Prix de Saint-Cloud and the Breeders' Cup Turf in America. At stud he also sired Singspiel, Mamool, Inglis Drever, Adlerflug (German Derby), Act One (Prix Lupin) and Kutub (Singapore Gold Cup). Winged Love's dam J'ai Deux Amours won one race and produced several other winners including Daiwa Caerleon who won at Grade II level in Japan. As a descendant of the broodmare Prompt Payment, J'ai Deux Amours was a distant relative of Chief Singer and Pleasantly Perfect

Winged Love was acquired by Sheikh Mohammed and sent into training with André Fabre at Chantilly in France.

== Racing career ==
=== 1994: two-year-old season ===
Winged Love made a successful racecourse debut by winning a minor race at Longchamp Racecourse on 4 September 1994 and was then moved up in class to contest the Group Three Prix de Condé over 1800 metres at the same course in October. Ridden by Thierry Jarnet, he started the 2.6/1 second favourite but after reaching second place in the straight he was unable to quicken on the soft ground and finished seventh of the eight runners behind the Criquette Head-trained Poliglote.

=== 1995: three-year-old season ===
In the early spring of 1995, Winged Love finished second to Un Solitaire in the Prix Longus over 2000 metres at Évry and second again when beaten a length by Rifapour in the Prix Christian de l'Hermite over 2100 metres at Saint-Cloud Racecourse. He recorded his first win of the season in the Listed Prix de Suresnes over 2100 metres at Longchamp on 27 April, beating Brother In Law by four lengths. In France, horses in the same ownership are coupled for betting purposes, and in the Prix du Jockey Club at Chantilly Racecourse on 4 June, the colt started at odds of 5/1 as part of a four horse entry by Sheikh Mohammed which also included Classic Cliche, Flemensfirth and Affidavit. The other French contenders included Rifapour, Poliglote, Diamond Mix (Prix Greffulhe) and Walk On Mix (Prix Noailles), but the clear favourite for the race was the British-trained Celtic Swing, the top-rated European juvenile of 1994. Ridden by Olivier Peslier, Winged Love raced in sixth place before moving up to third place in the straight. He was unable to make further progress, but ran on under a strong ride from Peslier to finish third, beaten half a length and a short head by Celtic Swing and Poliglote with Classic Cliche in fourth.

Winged Love was the only French-trained challenger for the Budweiser-sponsored Irish Derby at the Curragh on 2 July. Celtic Swing was made the 5/4 favourite, with Winged Love second in the betting on 5/1 alongside the unbeaten Dermot Weld-trained Definite Article. The other runners included Classic Cliche, Munwar (Lingfield Derby Trial), Annus Mirabilis (runner-up in the Racing Post Trophy and Dante Stakes), Humbel (Derrinstown Stud Derby Trial), Oscar Schindler and Double Eclipse (Zetland Stakes). Peslier positioned the colt just behind the leaders before moving up on the inside to take third place behind Munwar and Court of Honour entering the straight. Winged Love took the lead a quarter mile from the finish but was quickly challenged and overtaken by Definite Article on the outside with Celtic Swing making a run even further wide. After looking beaten, the French colt rallied strongly to regain the lead in the final strides and won by a short head from Definite Article, with Annus Mirabilis three quarters of a length away in third ahead of Oscar Schindler. Three weeks after his win at the Curragh, Winged Love was matched against older horses for the first time when he contested Britain's most prestigious weight-for-age race, the King George VI and Queen Elizabeth Stakes at Ascot Racecourse, and started 9/2 fourth choice in the betting behind Lammtarra, Carnegie and Pentire. He was restrained by Peslier in the early stages, and although he made progress in the straight he never looked likely to win and finished fourth behind Lammtarra, Pentire and Strategic Choice.

After a break of seven weeks, Winged Love returned on 10 September, for the Prix Niel, a trial race for the Prix de l'Arc de Triomphe. He started the 11/10 favourite against three opponents, but after making the running in a slowly-run race he finished third in a sprint finish, beaten a head and a neck by Housamix and Poliglote.

== Stud record ==
At the end of his racing career Winged Love was retired to stud to become a breeding stallion. He was originally based in Germany in 1996–2002 at Gestut Karlshof before moving to Scarvagh House Stud GB in 2002 and Tullyraine House Stud in County Down in 2006 where he covered more than a hundred mares in his first two seasons. He had little impact as a sire of runners on the flat, but made his mark as a National Hunt stallion. The best of his jumpers has been the outstanding two-mile chaser Twist Magic, whilst his other progeny have included Hunt Ball, Bostons Angel (Dr P. J. Moriarty Novice Chase, Fort Leney Novice Chase, RSA Chase) and Glynn. Winged Love died of colic on 24 May 2015 at Tullyraine House Stud. Tullyraine's owner Hugh Suffern described the stallion as "an absolute gentleman and very intelligent – a lovely horse to be associated with".

== Pedigree ==
Pedigree of Winged Love (IRE), bay stallion, 1992
Sire In The Wings (GB) 1986	Sadler's Wells (USA); 1981	Northern Dancer	Nearctic
Sire In The Wings (GB) 1986	Sadler's Wells (USA); 1981	Northern Dancer	Natalma
Sire In The Wings (GB) 1986	Sadler's Wells (USA); 1981	Fairy Bridge	Bold Reason
Sire In The Wings (GB) 1986	Sadler's Wells (USA); 1981	Fairy Bridge	Special
Sire In The Wings (GB) 1986	High Hawk (IRE); 1980	Shirley Heights	Mill Reef
Sire In The Wings (GB) 1986	High Hawk (IRE); 1980	Shirley Heights	Hardiemma
Sire In The Wings (GB) 1986	High Hawk (IRE); 1980	Sunbittern	Sea Hawk
Sire In The Wings (GB) 1986	High Hawk (IRE); 1980	Sunbittern	Pantoufle
Dam J'ai Deux Amours (FR) 1986	Top Ville (IRE); 1976	High Top	Derring-Do
Dam J'ai Deux Amours (FR) 1986	Top Ville (IRE); 1976	High Top	Camenae
Dam J'ai Deux Amours (FR) 1986	Top Ville (IRE); 1976	Sega Ville	Charlottesville
Dam J'ai Deux Amours (FR) 1986	Top Ville (IRE); 1976	Sega Ville	La Sega
Dam J'ai Deux Amours (FR) 1986	Pollenka (FR); 1973	Reliance	Tantieme
Dam J'ai Deux Amours (FR) 1986	Pollenka (FR); 1973	Reliance	Relance
Dam J'ai Deux Amours (FR) 1986	Pollenka (FR); 1973	Polana	Botticelli
Dam J'ai Deux Amours (FR) 1986	Pollenka (FR); 1973	Polana	Parabola (Family: 16-a)
