= Market Rasen Racecourse =

Horse racing venue in Market Rasen, England

Coordinates: 53°22′54.38″N 0°18′37.73″W

Market Rasen
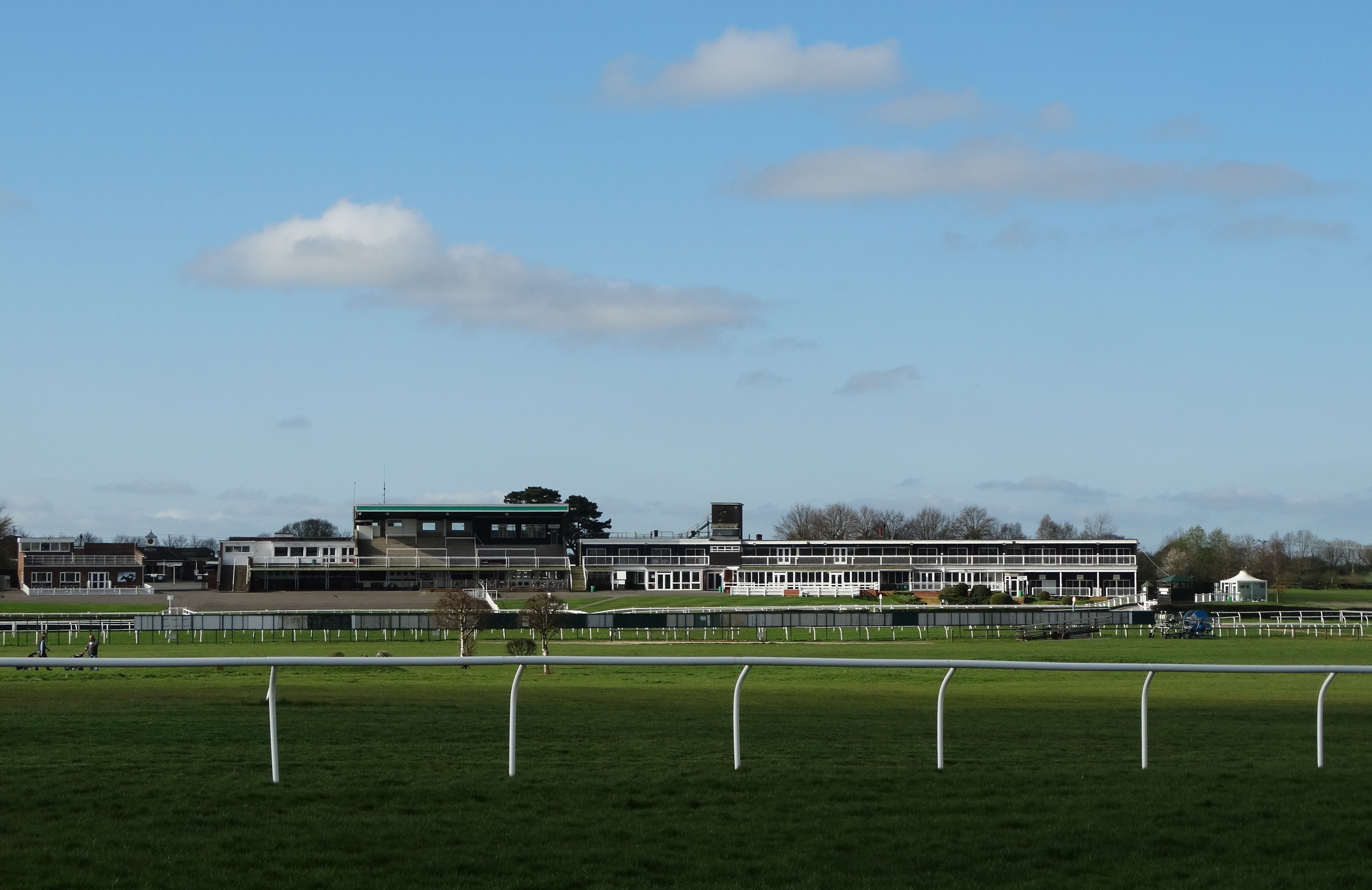
- The stands
- Interactive map of Market Rasen
- Location: Market Rasen, Lincolnshire
- Owned by: Jockey Club
- Screened on: Racing TV
- Course type: National Hunt

Market Rasen Racecourse is a National Hunt racecourse in the town of Market Rasen, in Lincolnshire, England. It is owned and operated by Jockey Club Racecourses.

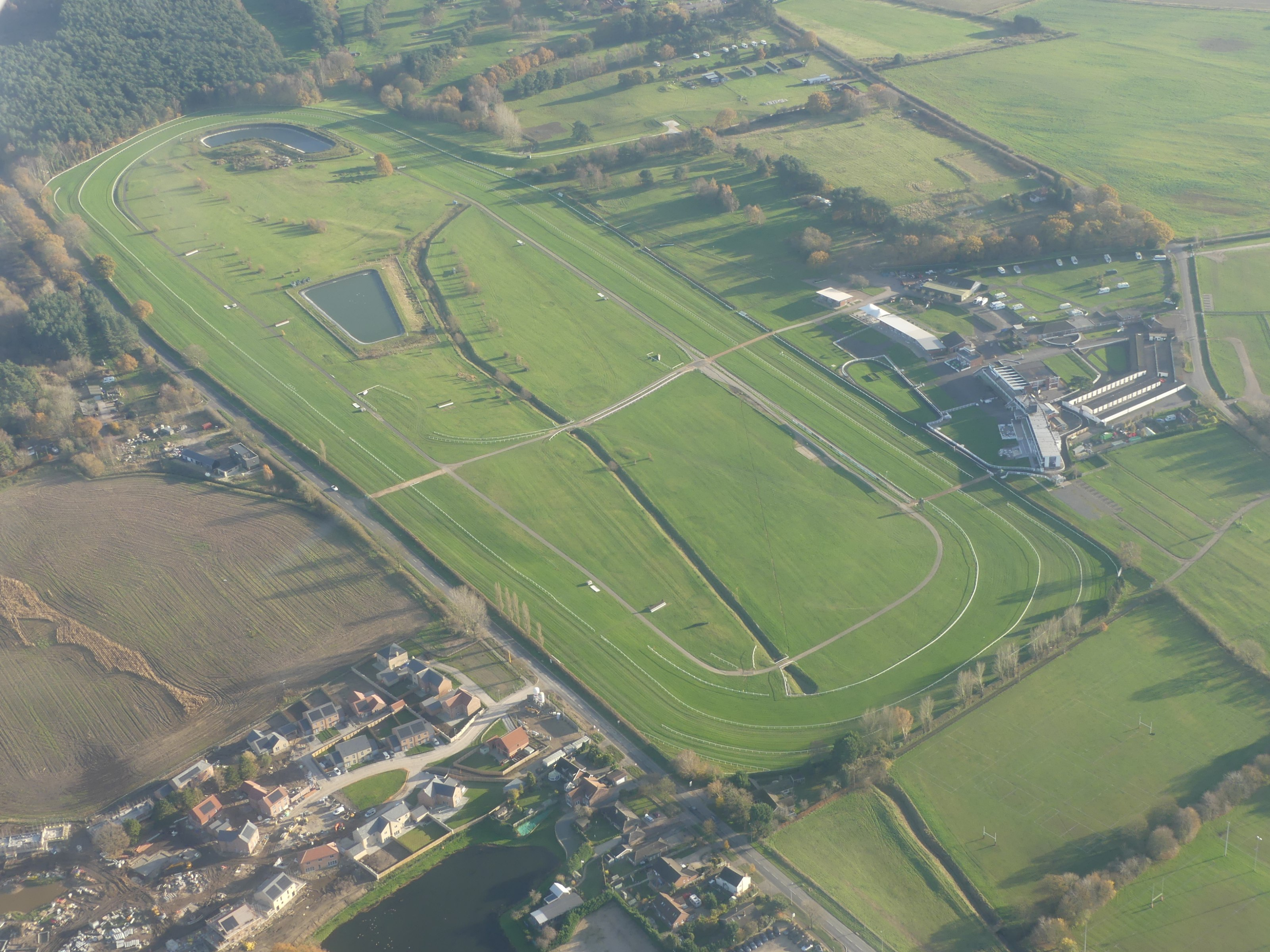
The racecourse from the air

Racing initially began at Market Rasen in the early 1800s, however found its current home in 1924, its first race meeting coming in April of that year. The course is a right-handed oval with a circumference of around one-and-a-quarter miles. Although National Hunt racing is traditionally a winter sport, Market Rasen stages a year-round programme of racing.

Its most high-profile fixture is the Summer Plate meeting, normally staged on the third Saturday in July. This features the two-and-a-quarter miles Summer Hurdle and the eponymous Summer Plate, a two-and-three-quarter miles chase, both of which are among the most valuable National Hunt races staged in Britain during the summer months.

Former jockey AP McCoy is the leading jockey by statistics, winning 27% of races he entered at Market Rasen. In 2014, he rode his 4,192nd winner beating friend and former colleague Martin Pipe's overall wins record.

== Notable races ==
Month	Race Name	Type	Grade	Distance	Age/Sex
July	Summer Plate	Chase	Premier Handicap	2m 5½f	4yo+
July	Summer Handicap Hurdle	Hurdle	Class 2 Handicap	2m ½f	3yo+
September	Prelude Handicap Hurdle	Hurdle	Class 2 Handicap	2m ½f	3yo+
November	Bud Booth Mares' Chase	Chase	Listed	3m	4yo+ m
December	Lincolnshire National	Chase	Class 3 Handicap	3m 3½f	4yo+
January	Alan Swinbank Mares' NH Flat Race	NH Flat	Listed	2m ½f	4-6yo m
