= Pineau de Re =

French-bred racehorse

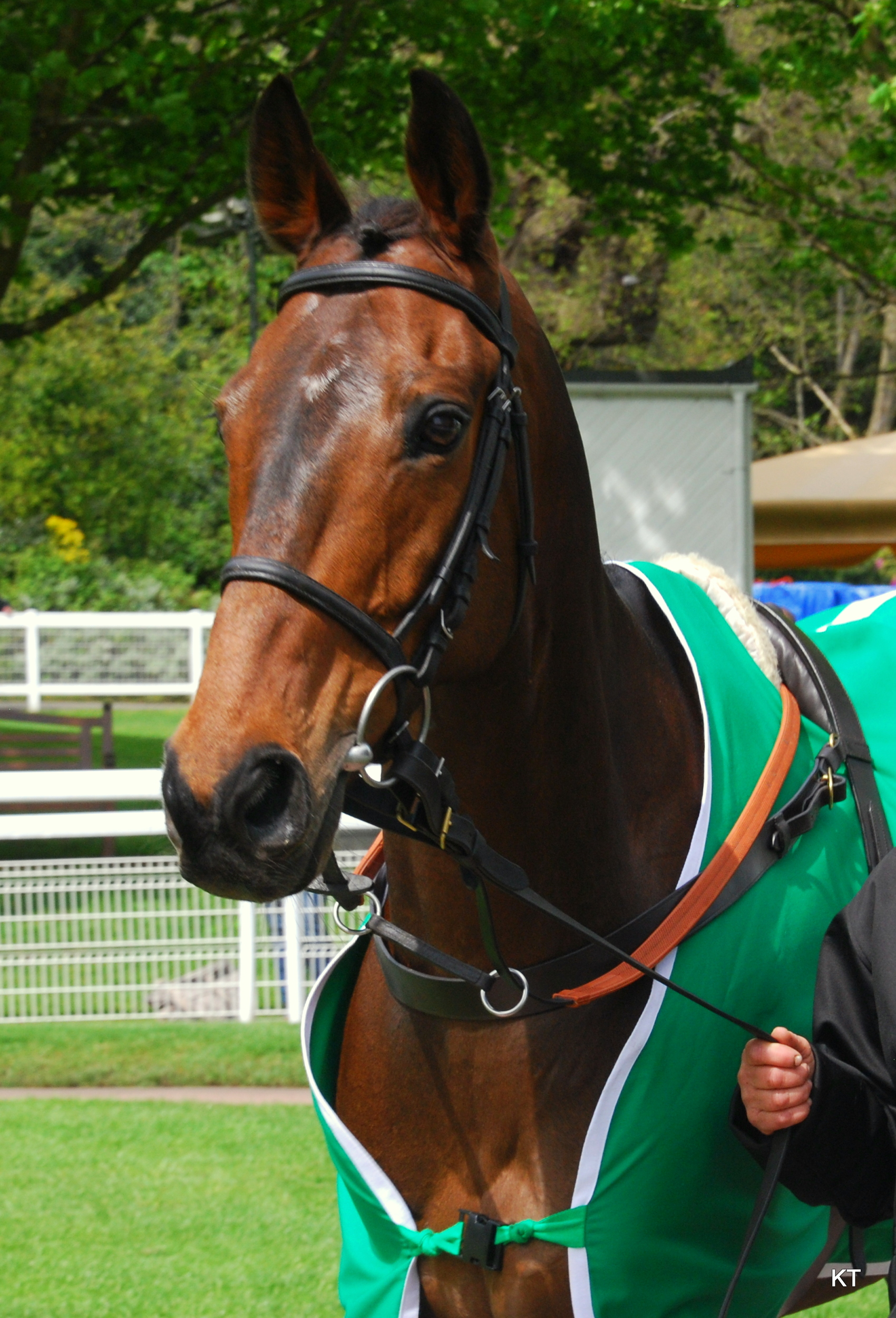
- Pineau De Re at Sandown in April 2014.
- Sire: Maresca Sorrento
- Grandsire: Cadoudal
- Dam: Elfe du Perche
- Damsire: Abdonski
- Sex: Gelding
- Foaled: 8 May 2003
- Country: France
- Colour: Bay
- Breeder: Michel Hardy
- Owner: Barry Connell; John Provan
- Trainer: Philip Fenton; Richard Newland
- Record: 44: 8-7-4
- Earnings: £677,271

Major wins
- Ulster Grand National (2013); Grand National (2014)

Pineau de Re (foaled 8 May 2003) is a French-bred, British-trained AQPS racehorse best known for winning the 2014 Grand National.

== Background ==
Pineau de Re is a bay gelding with no white markings bred in France by Michel Hardy. His sire Maresca Sorrento was a winning hurdler in France and has had some success as a sire of jumpers. His dam, Elfe du Perche was not a Thoroughbred, being of Selle Français ancestry. In July 2005 the gelding was consigned by the Ecurie Bayard to the Goffs France sale where he was bought for €20,000 by Seamus Murphy. The gelding was sent into training with Philip Fenton at Carrick-on-Suir, County Tipperary.

== Racing career ==
=== Irish career ===
Pineau de Re began his racing career in National Hunt Flat races in the 2007/2008 National Hunt season. He ran five times, finishing second on his debut at Limerick and recording his only success when winning at Fairyhouse on 23 February 2008.

After missing the whole of the next two seasons, Pineau de Re returned as a Novice hurdler. He won on his debut over obstacles at Limerick on 17 November 2010. He was beaten in four subsequent starts but showed good form when finishing second in both the Grade I Royal Bond Novice Hurdle and the Grade II Michael Purcell Memorial Novice Hurdle. The gelding continued to compete over hurdles in the 2011/2012 season recording his only success in six attempts when winning a handicap race at Thurles Racecourse in October.

In the following season, Pineau de Re was moved up to compete in steeplechases. He made little initial impact, being well beaten in his first four attempts over the larger obstacles before winning a minor event at Thurles on 3 January 2013. After two further defeats he was matched against more experienced opponents in the three and a half-mile Ulster Grand National at Downpatrick Racecourse on 3 April. Ridden by Danny Mullins, he started the 13/2 second favourite in a field of fifteen runners and won by twenty-three lengths.

=== British career ===
After his win in the Ulster National Pineau de Re was sold to John Provan and sent to be trained in England by Richard Newland at Claines in Worcestershire. Racing for his new connections, Pineau de Re ran four times without success in the summer of 2013.

Pineau de Re began the 2013/2014 season by finishing fifth in a hurdle race at Cheltenham Racecourse and then fell in the Becher Chase on his first run at Aintree in December. Later that month he returned to handicap hurdling, finishing second at Carlisle Racecourse and seventh at Haydock Park. He recorded his first victory in England in a Veterans' Steeplechase (restricted to horses aged 10 or over) at Exeter Racecourse on 14 January. Ridden by Sam Twiston-Davies he started the 11/4 favourite and won by five lengths from Tullamore Dew. On his final appearance before the Grand National, Pineau de Re ran for the first time at the Cheltenham Festival when he contested the Pertemps Final, a two-mile, five furlong handicap hurdle. Starting a 33/1 outsider, he finished strongly to take third place, beaten a nose and a neck by Fingal Bay and Southfield Theatre.

On 5 April, Pineau de Re started at odds of 25/1 for the 2014 Grand National at Aintree. He was ridden by the veteran jockey Leighton Aspell as Sam Twiston-Davies had opted to ride the more fancied Tidal Bay. The race was delayed by two false starts. Pineau de Re took the lead approaching the last of the thirty fences and drew away on the run-in to win by five lengths from Balthazar King, with the joint-favourite Double Seven in third place. After the race Aspell said "It's a wonderful day, this is what we do it for. I've been watching the National since I was a very young boy. As much as you enjoy sharing everyone's success, you crave a bit too. To get a chance to ride in the National is a great thing, and to get on one with a chance is even better".

In the following season, Pineau de Re was again aimed at the National, but his form was poor. He finished towards the rear in hurdle races at Cheltenham in November and Exeter in February and was pulled up at Carlisle in December. He again ran in the Pertemps Final in March, but on this occasion he finished eleventh of the twenty-three runners behind Call The Cops. In the Grand National he started at odds of 25/1 and finished twelfth of the nineteen finishers behind Many Clouds.

Pineau de Re returned in October 2015 and finished unplaced in a veteran's chase at Chepstow and then ran second to Vino Grigio at Sandown in November. The gelding fell at the second in the Becher Chase and then started at odds of 7/1 in a handicap hurdle at Carlisle on 13 December. Ridden by Richard Johnson he took the lead at the second last and won by four lengths under a weight of 162 pounds. His victory was notable as no Grand National winner had gone on to win another race since Bindaree won the Welsh National in 2003. He was pulled up in a hurdle race at Chepstow in February and then finished seventh in a veterans' chase at Newbury. He was assigned a weight of 142 pounds for the 2016 Grand National but did not qualify to run: the race was restricted to forty runners and Pineau de Re was rated forty-sixth in the handicap. Newland was unhappy at the exclusion, stating "The Grand National is the public's race and the public surely want to see a previous winner" before pointing out that many of the horses rated above Pineau de Re had earned their handicap marks over much shorter distances. Pineau de Re was then entered in the Scottish Grand National in which he unseated his rider. He was pulled up in his final race, a handicap chase at Uttoxeter on 30 April 2016 and the thirteen-year-old's retirement was announced after the race.

Following his retirement in 2016, Pineau de Re was retrained at the eventing yard near Worcester of Lizzie Brunt, a work rider for Newland's yard. He has competed at Novice level in eventing and was one of three finalists for the 2023 Retraining of Racehorses horse of the year competition.

== Honours ==
In July 2014 the sign welcoming visitors to the village of Claines was redesigned to read "Welcome to Claines, Home of 2014 Grand National winner Pineau De Re".

== Pedigree ==
Pedigree of Pineau de Re (FR), bay gelding, 2003
Sire Maresca Sorrento (FR) 1995	Cadoudal (FR); 1979	Green Dancer	Nijinsky
Sire Maresca Sorrento (FR) 1995	Cadoudal (FR); 1979	Green Dancer	Green Valley
Sire Maresca Sorrento (FR) 1995	Cadoudal (FR); 1979	Come To Sea	Sea Hawk
Sire Maresca Sorrento (FR) 1995	Cadoudal (FR); 1979	Come To Sea	Camarilla
Sire Maresca Sorrento (FR) 1995	French Free Star (FR); 1981	Carmarthen	Devon
Sire Maresca Sorrento (FR) 1995	French Free Star (FR); 1981	Carmarthen	Kuwait
Sire Maresca Sorrento (FR) 1995	French Free Star (FR); 1981	Varga	Tombeur
Sire Maresca Sorrento (FR) 1995	French Free Star (FR); 1981	Varga	Peditao
Dam Elfe du Perche (FR) 1992	Abdonski (FR); 1980	Bolkonski	Balidar
Dam Elfe du Perche (FR) 1992	Abdonski (FR); 1980	Bolkonski	Perennial
Dam Elfe du Perche (FR) 1992	Abdonski (FR); 1980	Abdecka	Abdos
Dam Elfe du Perche (FR) 1992	Abdonski (FR); 1980	Abdecka	Strelka
Dam Elfe du Perche (FR) 1992	Ut de Perche (FR); 1986	Carmont	Carmarthen
Dam Elfe du Perche (FR) 1992	Ut de Perche (FR); 1986	Carmont	Montagne
Dam Elfe du Perche (FR) 1992	Ut de Perche (FR); 1986	Djoumi	Vieux Chateau
Dam Elfe du Perche (FR) 1992	Ut de Perche (FR); 1986	Djoumi	Loyola (Selle Français)

- Pineau de Re is inbred 3 × 4 to the French stallion Carmarthen, meaning that this stallion appear in both the third and fourth generation of his pedigree.
