= Líon Na Bearnaí =

Irish-bred Thoroughbred racehorse

- Sire: New Frontier
- Dam: Polly Plum
- Foaled: 2002
- Trainer: Tom Gibney
- Rider: Andrew Thornton

Líon Na Bearnaí is an Irish bred racehorse that won the Irish Grand National in 2012. Líon na bearnaí is Irish for "Fill in the gaps," a common instruction in school textbooks. The horse which is owned by the Lock Syndicate, trained by Tom Gibney, and ridden by Andrew Thornton, won the Irish National by four and a half lengths at a starting price of 33–1.

Líon Na Bearnaí comes from the bloodline of his sire, New Frontier, a Sadler's Wells horse, and on his dam's side, Mr. Prospector.
