= Crabbie's =

Brand of alcoholic ginger beer

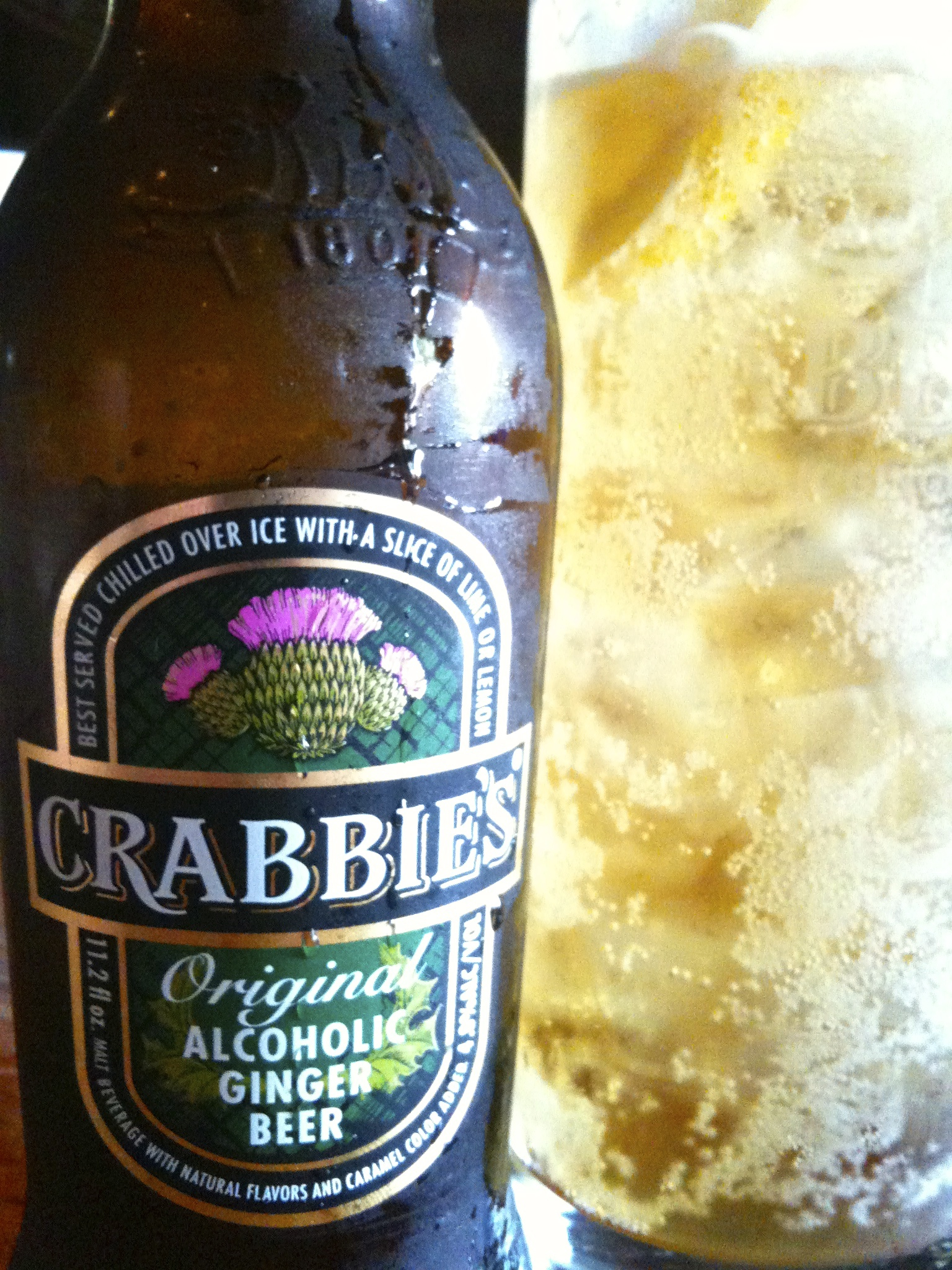
- Type: Ginger beer
- Manufacturer: John Crabbie & Company
- Distributor: Halewood International Limited (United Kingdom, Australia) Bruce Ashley Group (CAN) St. Killian (USA)
- Origin: Scotland, Leith, Edinburgh
- Introduced: 1801
- Alcohol by volume: 3.4%
- Colour: golden yellow
- Flavour: Ginger beer with a spicy sparkling flavour
- Variants: Spiced Orange Strawberry & Lime Scottish Raspberry
- Website: Crabbie's

Crabbie's is a brand of alcoholic ginger beer originating in Scotland. It is owned by UK-based Halewood International Ltd and manufactures at Halewood's plant in Liverpool.

== Background ==
Crabbie's traces its founding to 1801 when Miller Crabbie was a merchant in Edinburgh. The business was inherited by his son John Crabbie (1806 – 1891) who went on to found John Crabbie & Co.

In the mid-19th century, John Crabbie acquired a former porter brewery located between Yardheads and Great Junction Street in Edinburgh's port of Leith. Over the ensuing years the premises were extended mainly to provide bonded warehouses for Crabbie's whisky business. The company was also engaged in gin rectifying and the production of fruit-based cordials. Of these, Crabbie's was best known for its green ginger wine which was continued to be made in Leith until the 1980s when John Crabbie & Co was acquired by another Leith distiller and blender, Macdonald & Muir, and production of green ginger wine was transferred to Broxburn, West Lothian. Macdonald & Muir had acquired the Glenmorangie Distillery in 1918 and renamed itself The Glenmorangie Company in 1996. In 2007, it sold the brand to the present owners, Halewood International. Preserving its links with Leith, John Crabbie & Company Limited is in the present day a dormant company with a company address in Mitchell Street, Leith. However, production of Crabbie's ginger beer takes place in Liverpool, England.

== Distribution ==
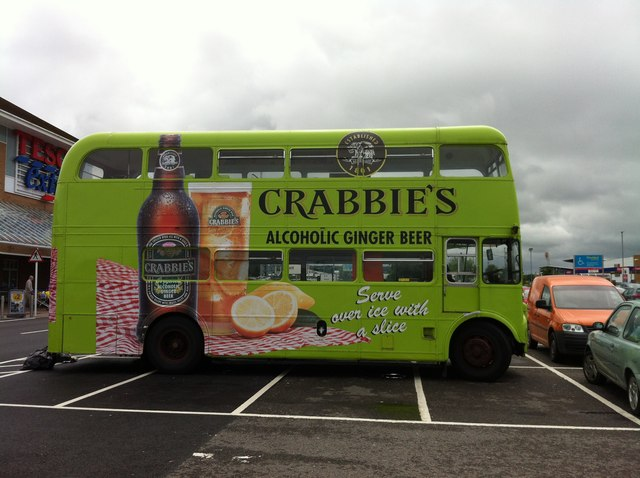
Crabbie's advertisement on a bus in the UK

Since 2011, Crabbie's has been distributed in Australia through Woolworths Liquor, Beer Wine Spirits and Dan Murphy's grocery stores. In 2012, Crabbie's began distribution in the United States through St. Killian company.

== Variations ==
In the UK, Crabbie's is available in flavours such as Original, Scottish Raspberry, IPA and Stout, with a Spiced Orange variant also available in the United States. Outside of the UK and the United States, other variations might be found in speciality shops.

In the UK, it is a gluten free product. in May 2019 Crabbie's changed their Ginger Beer recipe to contain 5% actual beer so it now contains wheat and barley, but still maintains its Gluten Free label as the new gluten containing ingredients have a gluten level of less than 20 ppm. The product is no longer suitable for anyone with a wheat or barley intolerance.

In May 2024, the alcohol content of the UK variant was reduced from 4.0% ABV to 3.4%

In the United States, Crabbie's is sold as a malt beverage and is not gluten free. The discovery that the American version of Crabbie's is not gluten free caused much alarm and controversy among the celiac and gluten intolerant community, as Crabbie's was originally marketed as gluten free in the United States.

== Sponsorship ==
Crabbie's is a sponsor of both international and grassroots rugby, with sponsorships of Wales & Scotland, and Rugby Union clubs Ospreys, Newport Dragons, Scarlets, Cardiff Blues, Edinburgh Rugby, Glasgow Warriors, Newcastle Falcons, Northampton Saints, Yorkshire Carnegie, Richmond, Esher, Caldy, Southport and Rugby League club St Helens.

Crabbie's is the headline sponsor for Bournemouth 7s Festival who are the World's Largest Sports and Music Festival taking place with over 400 teams in the last Bank Holiday weekend in May.

Crabbie's was the official sponsor of the Grand National Festival from 2013 to 2016.

Scottish football club Hibernian has also been sponsored by Crabbie's.
