= Cornelius Lysaght =

British horse racing journalist (born 1965)

- Born: 1965 (age 60–61); Gloucester, England
- Education: Eton College
- Occupations: Journalist, broadcaster

Cornelius Lysaght (/ˈlaɪsət/ LY-sət, born 1965 in Gloucester, England) is a British journalist and broadcaster who was the BBC's horse racing correspondent from 2001 until 2020.

Lysaght was raised in Herefordshire and educated at Eton College. He began broadcasting in 1981 with radio stations Severn Sound (Gloucester) and Southern Sound (Brighton), then worked as a producer and presenter for the Racecall telephone commentary service.

He joined BBC Radio in 1990, around the time of the launch of the first version of Radio 5, a channel that included sports programmes. He took up the position of horse racing correspondent in June 2001, succeeding Peter Bromley, who had held the position since 1959. In this role he was usually heard on BBC Radio 5 Live. In 2003, Lysaght helped 5 Live's racing team win a Sony Award for its Cheltenham Festival coverage. In the 1990s he appeared on BBC Radio 1 as the voice of Mark and Lard's daily competition feature "Dobbins or Bobbins".

He has written for the London Evening Standard, Horse and Hound magazine, the Sunday Mirror, Owner/Breeder magazine, The Times, The Guardian, Radio Times and for the BBC website. His first book World Racecourses was published by Collins in October 2018.

He is a supporter of Everton F.C., and has been owner or joint owner of a number of racehorses trained by Mrs S C Bradburne, Nick Alexander, A Balding and M D Hammond.

It was announced in December 2019 that he would be leaving the BBC in 2020.
