= Halewood International =

British distiller

Halewood Artisanal Spirits
- Founded: 1978
- Founder: John Edward Halewood
- Products: Artisanal spirits
- Owner: The Estate of the late John Edward Halewood
- Number of employees: c.400
- Website: www.halewood-int.com

Halewood International or Halewood Artisanal Spirits PLC are UK-based distiller and distributor of artisanal spirits.

== Structure ==
Halewood Artisanal Spirit's head office is in Rushden. The company distills across the UK at the following locations: London, Edinburgh, Abergwyngregyn, Bristol, Liverpool, Berkshire, and the Lake District.

The Halewood Group has six operations outside the UK: Australia, China, Canada, Germany, Thailand and the United States.

== History ==
John Halewood founded the company in 1978, initially selling Bulgarian wines from his garage. He later launched his first product, Club Royal (sherry), and in 1987 expanded his portfolio by purchasing Hall & Bramley and Lamb and Watt. In 1990 he formed a joint venture in Romania just after the fall of the Berlin Wall. This was followed by the acquisition of Red Square Vodka in 1991, which was later reconfigured to fit into the new Ready-to-Drink market as Red Square Ice. Witnessing the success of Lambrusco Italian wine in 1994 he launched Lambrini sparkling perry, which quickly became the company's largest-selling product.

Halewood purchased the ginger wine brand Crabbie's from Glenmorangie in 2002 and then created the alcoholic ginger beer in 2009. Subsequently the company built a whisky distillery in Edinburgh.

In 2009, Halewood purchased Whitley Neill Gin from Johnny Neill; Neill was appointed as a Brand Ambassador.

John Halewood died in October 2011. John's wife, Judy Halewood, was appointed as chairman following his death.

Halewood International moved the production of JJ Whitley Vodka to St. Petersburg, Russia in 2020. Two years later, following Russia's invasion of Ukraine in February of 2022, production was moved back to the UK.

In April 2021, the company name changed from Halewood International to Halewood Artisanal Spirits (UK).
