= Downpatrick Racecourse =

Horse racing venue in Northern Ireland

Coordinates: 54°18′45″N 5°43′41″W

Downpatrick Racecourse, located one mile from the town of Downpatrick in County Down, is one of the two horse racing courses in Northern Ireland, (the other being Down Royal).

The first race meeting at Downpatrick was held in 1685 under the charter of James II of England. The king issued letters patent creating The Royal Corporation of Horse Breeders in the County of Down.

Although Northern Ireland is part of the United Kingdom, horse racing is run on an All Ireland basis, so Downpatrick falls under the aegis of Horse Racing Ireland rather than the British Horseracing Authority.

The course now stages only National Hunt racing following the discontinuation of Flat Racing at the track. The feature race at the course is the Ulster National Handicap Chase run over a distance of 3 miles 4 furlongs 110 yards.
