= Richard Newland (racehorse trainer) =

British horse trainer and general practitioner

Richard Newland is a British horse trainer and former general practitioner, whose horse Pineau De Re won the 2014 Grand National. He lives in Worcestershire with his wife Laura and three daughters Amelia, Felicity and Annabelle.
