= Kingwell Hurdle =

Hurdle horse race in Britain

Kingwell Hurdle
2026
Alexei	Rubaud	Secret Squirrel

Previous years
2025
Golden Ace	Burdett Road	Hansard
2024
Nemean Lion	Colonel Mustard	Goshen
2023
I Like To Move It	Knappers Hill	First Street
2022
Goshen	Adagio	Faivoir
2021
Goshen	Song For Someone	Navajo Pass

2020-2011
2020
Song For Someone	Diego Du Charmil	Ch'tibello
2019
Grand Sancy	Sceau Royal	Vision Des Flos
2018
Elgin	Ch'tibello	Call Me Lord
2017
Yanworth	Ch'tibello	Sceau Royal
2016
Rayvin Black	Melodic Rendezvous	Pain Au Chocolat
2015
Blue Heron	Irving	Hint of Mint
2014
Melodic Rendezvous	Zarkandar	Grumeti
2013
Zarkandar	Khyber Kim	Balder Succes
2012
Binocular	Celestial Halo	Starluck
2011
Mille Chief	Celestial Halo	Ronaldo Des Mottes

2010-2001
2009
Ashkazar	Whiteoak	Punjabi
2008
Katchit	Blythe Knight	Alph
2007
Straw Bear	Afsoun	Trouble at Bay
2006
Briareus	Royal Shakespeare	Natal
2005
Inglis Drever	Perouse	Royal Shakespeare
2004
Rigmarole	Intersky Falcon	Grave Doubts
2003
Rhinestone Cowboy	Thisthatandtother	Hors La Loi III
2002
Hors La Loi III	Copeland	Brother Joe
2001
Azertyuiop	Hors La Loi III	Hit And Run

2000-1991
2000
Hors La Loi III	Auetaler	Krabloonik
1999
Grey Shot	Midnight Legend	Upgrade
1998
I'm Supposin	Master Beveled	Wahiba Sands
1997
Dreams End	Romancer	Blast Freeze
1995
Alderbrook	Trying Again	Jazilah
1994
Valfinet	Royal Derbi	High Baron
1993
Valfinet	Kribensis	Muse
1992
Fidway	Gran Alba	Oh So Risky
1991
Welsh Bard	Danny Harrold	Major Inquiry

1990-1988
1990
Kribensis	Island Set	Cruising Altitude
1989
Floyd	Aldino	Jazetas
1988
Floyd	Private Audition	Past Glories

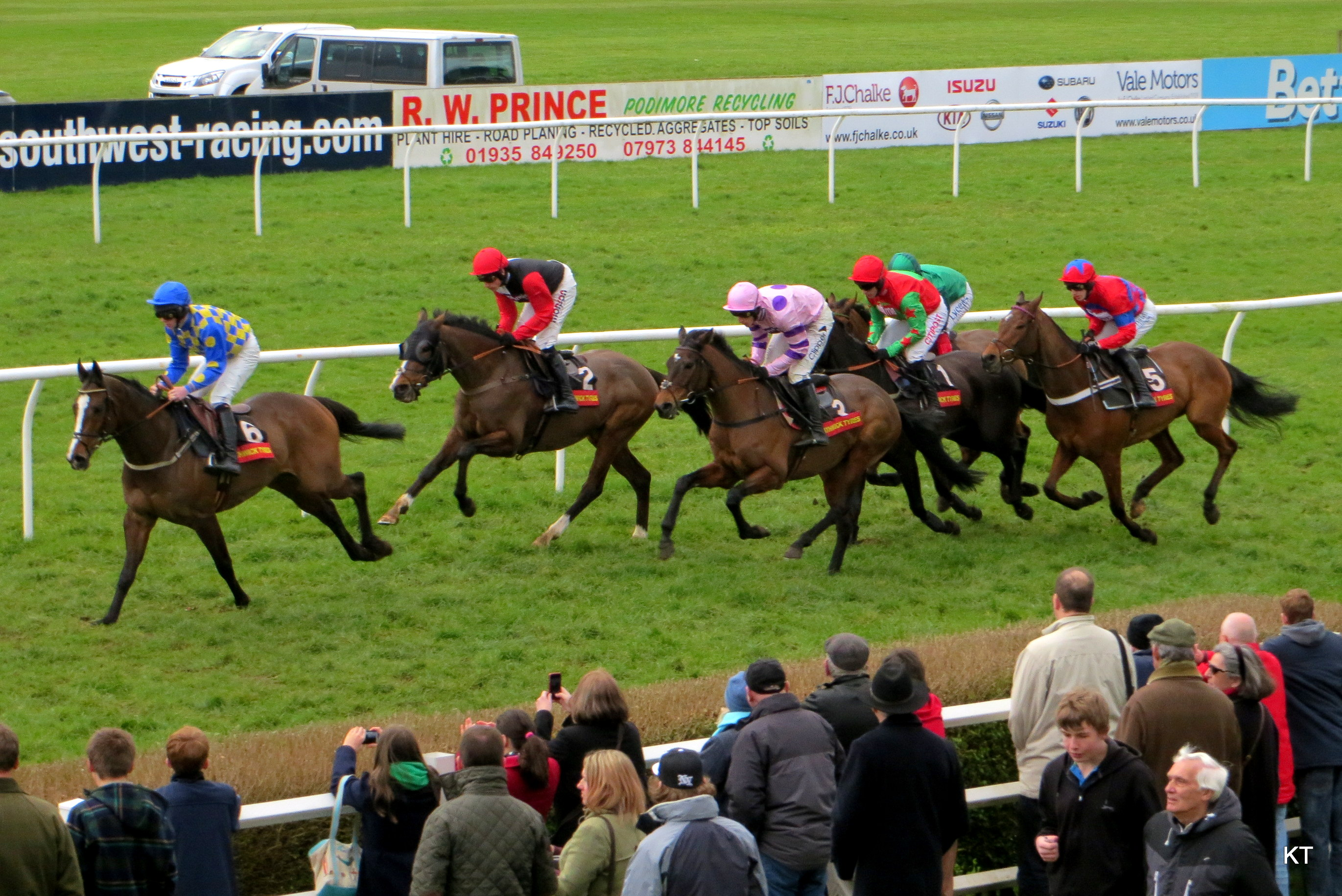
The 2013 running

The Kingwell Hurdle is a Grade 2 National Hunt hurdle race in Great Britain which is open to horses aged four years or older. It is run at Wincanton over a distance of about 2 miles (1 mile, 7 furlongs and 65 yards, or 3,077 metres ), and during its running there are eight hurdles to be jumped. The race is scheduled to take place each year in February.

The race was first run in 1971 and was awarded Grade 2 status in 1991.

The event serves as an important trial for the Champion Hurdle in March. Several horses have won both races in the same year, and the most recent to achieve this was Golden Ace in 2025.

== Winners ==
- Amateur jockeys indicated by "Mr".

Year	Winner	Age	Jockey	Trainer
1971	Bula	6	Richard Pitman	Fred Winter
1972	Bula	7	Paul Kelleway	Fred Winter
1973	Bula	8	Paul Kelleway	Fred Winter
1974	Lanzarote	6	Richard Pitman	Fred Winter
1975	Lanzarote	7	Richard Pitman	Fred Winter
1976	Lanzarote	8	John Francome	Fred Winter
1977	Dramatist	6	Bill Smith	Fulke Walwyn
1978	Abandoned due to snow
1979	Western Rose	7	Colin Tinkler	Fred Rimell
1980	Random Leg	5	Richard Rowe	Josh Gifford
1981	Jugador	6	Peter Haynes	Derek Kent
1982	Walnut Wonder	7	Colin Brown	David Elsworth
1983	Migrator	7	Richard Linley	Les Kennard
1984	Desert Orchid	5	Colin Brown	David Elsworth
1985	Abandoned due to frost and snow
1986	Abandoned due to snow
1987	Hypnosis	8	Peter Scudamore	David Elsworth
1988	Floyd	8	Colin Brown	David Elsworth
1989	Floyd	9	Richard Dunwoody	David Elsworth
1990	Kribensis	6	Richard Dunwoody	Michael Stoute
1991	Welsh Bard	7	Peter Scudamore	Charlie Brooks
1992	Fidway	7	Peter Scudamore	Tim Thomson Jones
1993	Valfinet	6	Peter Scudamore	Martin Pipe
1994	Valfinet	7	Richard Dunwoody	Martin Pipe
1995	Alderbrook	6	Norman Williamson	Kim Bailey
1996	Abandoned due to frost and snow
1997	Dreams End	9	Richard Dunwoody	Peter Bowen
1998	I'm Supposin	6	Richard Dunwoody	Richard Rowe
1999	Grey Shot	7	Jamie Osborne	Ian Balding
2000	Hors La Loi III	5	Dean Gallagher	François Doumen
2001	Azertyuiop	4	Adrian Maguire	Paul Nicholls
2002	Hors La Loi III	7	Dean Gallagher	James Fanshawe
2003	Rhinestone Cowboy	7	Norman Williamson	Jonjo O'Neill
2004	Rigmarole	6	Ruby Walsh	Paul Nicholls
2005	Inglis Drever	6	Tony McCoy	Howard Johnson
2006	Briareus	6	Mr Tom Greenall	Andrew Balding
2007	Straw Bear	6	Tony McCoy	Nick Gifford
2008	Katchit	5	Robert Thornton	Alan King
2009	Ashkazar	5	Timmy Murphy	David Pipe
2010	Abandoned due to frost
2011	Mille Chief	5	Robert Thornton	Alan King
2012	Binocular	8	Tony McCoy	Nicky Henderson
2013	Zarkandar	6	Daryl Jacob	Paul Nicholls
2014	Melodic Rendezvous	8	Nick Scholfield	Jeremy Scott
2015	Blue Heron	7	Harry Skelton	Dan Skelton
2016	Rayvin Black	7	Tom Garner	Oliver Sherwood
2017	Yanworth	7	Barry Geraghty	Alan King
2018	Elgin	6	Wayne Hutchinson	Alan King
2019	Grand Sancy	5	Harry Skelton	Paul Nicholls
2020	Song for Someone	5	Aidan Coleman	Tom Symonds
2021	Goshen	5	Jamie Moore	Gary Moore
2022	Goshen	6	Jamie Moore	Gary Moore
2023	I Like To Move It	6	Sam Twiston-Davies	Nigel Twiston-Davies
2024	Nemean Lion	7	Richard Patrick	Kerry Lee
2025	Golden Ace	7	Lorcan Williams	Jeremy Scott
2026	Alexei	6	Brendan Powell	Joe Tizzard

== See also ==
- Horseracing in Great Britain
- List of British National Hunt races
