= Triple Crown of Hurdling =

The Triple Crown of Hurdling is awarded to a horse that wins all three of the open, two-mile Grade 1 Hurdling races in any given English National Hunt season:

1. The Fighting Fifth Hurdle, held at the Newcastle Racecourse
2. The Christmas Hurdle, held at Kempton Park Racecourse
3. The Champion Hurdle, held at Cheltenham Racecourse

From 2006 to 2010, the World Bet Exchange (WBX) put up a £1,000,000 bonus for any horse that wins the Triple Crown. WBX offered the prize, the richest in hurdling history. The bonus was split among the winning horse's connections as follows:

- Owner: £700,000
- Trainer: £150,000
- Stable Lad: £100,000
- Stable Staff: £50,000

Before 2023, the only horse to win all three races in one season was Kribensis, a grey Henbit gelding, trained by Sir Michael Stoute in 1989–90. Since the WBX bonus was introduced, only Punjabi and Go Native came close to claiming the prize, each winning two of the three races. After the bonus was withdrawn, their achievements were matched by My Tent Or Yours and Faugheen. However, in the 2022/2023 season, the breath-taking Bay gelding Constitution Hill, trained by Nicky Henderson and ridden by Nico de Boinville, swept all three races and claimed the Triple Crown for owner Michael Buckley.

== Punjabi (2008/09) ==
Punjabi was the first horse who came closest of winning the WBX bonus. After narrowly beating the former champion hurdler Sublimity by a head in the 2008 Fighting Fifth Hurdle, Punjabi fell heavily in the 2008 Christmas Hurdle at the second-last flight while vying for the lead. Three months later, Punjabi held off the late rally of Celestial Halo to win the 2009 Smurfit Kappa Champion Hurdle as a 22/1 outsider.

His trainer, Nicky Henderson, was left to regret what might have been: "He was the forgotten horse. We'd have won a £1 million bonus if he hadn't fallen in the Christmas Hurdle at Kempton. He would have won I think. He was cantering. Anyway this makes up for it." Punjabi's owner, Raymond Tooth, later described Punjabi's fall at Kempton as, "...probably the most expensive fall in the history of racing."

== Go Native (2009/10) ==
Without his normal jockey Paul Carberry, Go Native entered the 2009 Fighting Fifth Hurdle as a 25-1 long-shot. Go Native and jockey Davy Condon went on to win the race by 2.5 lengths over Sublimity. Paul Carberry was quoted as saying: It wasn't a surprise to me. It looked tough on paper, but we know how good he is.

Go Native, owned by the Docado Syndicate, entered the Christmas Hurdle as the 5-2 second favourite (behind Binocular), and went on to secure a narrow victory over Starluck.

A win in the 2010 Cheltenham Festival for Go Native would have made him the first horse to win the WBX bonus. Over £205,000 was wagered on WBX for the 2009-10 Triple Crown to be won, the market was backed in from a high of 49/1 before the first leg to a low of 3.8/1 prior to the Champion Hurdle. With jockey Paul Carberry set to ride Go Native, Meade said of his horse: He's in great order and I couldn't be happier with him. It's all systems go. He looks great, he had a little breeze out on the track and he was nice and fresh. His last piece of work was pretty good all right, we were very happy with it. Unfortunately, Go Native was unable to clear the second hurdle cleanly and could not recover, finishing the race in 10th place.

== Triple Crown leg winners since the 1979/80 season ==
Winner Groups
Winners of the Triple Crown
Winners of 2 out of the 3 Triple Crown races that includes the Champion Hurdle
Winners of the Fighting Fifth and Christmas Hurdle

Race Season	Fighting Fifth Hurdle	Christmas Hurdle	Champion Hurdle
1979/80	Birds Nest	Birds Nest	Sea Pigeon
1980/81	Sea Pigeon	Celtic Ryde	Sea Pigeon
1981/82	Ekbalco	— (Note: Race not run)	For Auction
1982/83	Donegal Prince	Ekbalco	Gaye Brief
1983/84	Gaye Brief	Dawn Run	Dawn Run
1984/85	Browne's Gazette	Browne's Gazette	See You Then
1985/86	Out of the Gloom	Aonoch	See You Then
1986/87	Tom Sharp	Nohalmdun	See You Then
1987/88	Floyd	Osric	Celtic Shot
1988/89	Floyd	Kribensis	Beech Road
1989/90	Kribensis	Kribensis	Kribensis
1990/91	Beech Road	Fidway	Morley Street
1991/92	Royal Derbi	Gran Alba	Royal Gait
1992/93	Halkopous	Mighty Mogul	Granville Again
1993/94	—	Muse	Flakey Dove
1994/95	Batabanoo	Absalom's Lady	Alderbrook
1995/96	Padre Mio	—	Collier Bay
1996/97	Space Trucker	—	Make A Stand
1997/98	Star Rage	Kerawi	Istabraq
1998/99	Dato Star	French Holly	Istabraq
1999/00	Dato Star	Dato Star	Istabraq
2000/01	Barton	Geos	—
2001/02	Landing Light	Landing Light	Hors La Loi III
2002/03	Intersky Falcon	Intersky Falcon	Rooster Booster
2003/04	The French Furze	Intersky Falcon	Hardy Eustace
2004/05	Harchibald	Harchibald	Hardy Eustace
2005/06	Arcalis	Feathard Lady	Brave Inca
2006/07	Straw Bear	Jazz Messenger	Sublimity
2007/08	Harchibald	Straw Bear	Katchit
2008/09	Punjabi	Harchibald	Punjabi
2009/10	Go Native	Go Native	Binocular
2010/11	Peddlers Cross	Binocular	Hurricane Fly
2011/12	Overturn	Binocular	Rock On Ruby
2012/13	Countrywide Flame	Darlan	Hurricane Fly
2013/14	My Tent Or Yours	My Tent Or Yours	Jezki
2014/15	Irving	Faugheen	Faugheen
2015/16	Identity Thief	Faugheen	Annie Power
2016/17	Irving	Yanworth	Buveur d'Air
2017/18	Buveur d'Air	Buveur d'Air	Buveur d'Air
2018/19	Buveur d'Air	Verdana Blue	Espoir d'Allen
2019/20	Cornerstone Lad	Epatante	Epatante
2020/21	Epatante	Silver Streak	Honeysuckle
2021/22	Epatante; Not So Sleepy ^{dh}	Epatante	Honeysuckle
2022/23	Constitution Hill	Constitution Hill	Constitution Hill

== See also ==
- Triple Crown of Thoroughbred Racing (United Kingdom)
- Horseracing in Great Britain
