= Buveur d'Air =

French racehorse

- Racing silks of Mme Philippe Chemin, Potensis Ltd and J. P. McManus
- Sire: Crillon
- Grandsire: Saumarez
- Dam: History
- Damsire: Alesso
- Sex: Gelding
- Foaled: 12 May 2011
- Country: France
- Colour: Bay
- Breeder: Gerard Ferte
- Owner: Philippe Chemin; Potensis Bloodstock & Chris Giles; J P McManus
- Trainer: Philippe Chemin; Nicky Henderson
- Record: 25: 17-5-1
- Earnings: £1,220,193

Major wins
- Top Novices' Hurdle (2016); Contenders Hurdle (2017, 2018, 2019); Champion Hurdle (2017, 2018); Aintree Hurdle (2017); Fighting Fifth Hurdle (2017, 2018); Christmas Hurdle (2017); Punchestown Champion Hurdle (2019)

Buveur d'Air (foaled 12 May 2011) is a retired French-bred British-trained AQPS racehorse who competed in National Hunt races. After winning twice in his native France he moved to England and won the Top Novices' Hurdle in 2016. In the following season he won two steeplechases before reverting to hurdle races to win the Contenders Hurdle and then recording his biggest success in the Champion Hurdle. In the 2017–18 season he was unbeaten, winning the Fighting Fifth Hurdle, Christmas Hurdle and a second Champion Hurdle, so becoming the second horse, after Kribensis, to win the Triple Crown of Hurdling. The 2018-19 season saw him win both the Fighting Fifth Hurdle and the Contenders Hurdle for the second time. In November 2019 he sustained a freak injury in the Fighting Fifth Hurdle and did not race for the rest of the season.

Buveur d'Air was retired from racing on 29 June, 2022.

== Background ==
Buveur d'Air (French for "drinker of air") is a bay gelding with a small white star bred in France by Gérard Ferté. In his early racing career he was trained in France by his owner Philippe Chemin.

Buveur d'Air's sire Crillon won five races including the Listed Prix Denisy and ran second to Montjeu in the Prix Foy. He later became a successful sire of jumpers whose other offspring have included Alex he Larredya (Grand Prix d'Automne) and Jemy Baie (Prix Troytown). His dam History was unraced but produced several other winners including Punchestowns whose victories included the Long Walk Hurdle and the Scilly Isles Novices' Chase. She was a distant female-line descendant of Kandy who won the 1000 Guineas in 1932. She was not, however, considered a Thoroughbred as her pedigree included the Selle Français stallion Evainqueur.

== Racing career ==
=== 2014–2015: National Hunt Flat races ===
Buveur d'Air began his racing career in flat races restricted to AQPS horses. He was unbeaten in two French races, winning at Saint-Jean-de-Monts in August 2014 and at Nantes on 2 October. The gelding was then acquired by Potensis Bloodstock and Chris Giles and was sent to England where he was trained at Upper Lambourn in Berkshire by Nicky Henderson. Competing for his new connections in National Hunt Flat races he finished second to Barters Hill in February 2015 at Newbury Racecourse and then finished fourth behind the same horse in the more competitive Champion Standard Open NH Flat Race at Aintree's Grand National meeting in April.

=== 2015/2016 National Hunt season ===
In the 2015/2016 National Hunt season Buveur d'Air was campaigned in novice hurdle races. On his debut over obstacles he won a maiden hurdle at Newbury in November taking the lead at the final flight and accelerating clear to win in "impressive" style by eleven lengths from the favoured Wait For Me. At Huntingdon Racecourse in January he started at odds of 2/11 and won "very easily" by seven lengths from eight opponents.

Buveur d'Air made his first appearance at the Cheltenham Festival on 15 March 2016 when he started the 10/1 third favourite in a fourteen-runner field for the Supreme Novices' Hurdle. After being restrained by his regular jockey Noel Fehily in the early stages he stayed on without ever looking likely to win and finished third behind his stablemate Altior and the Irish-trained Min. Buveur d'Air returned to Aintree in April and started the 11/4 second favourite behind Limini (winner of the Dawn Run Mares' Novices' Hurdle) in the Grade 1 Top Novices' Hurdle. Equipped with ear-plugs, he moved into contention at the final flight, caught the leader Petit Mouchoir in the final strides and won by a neck with a gap of eight lengths back to Limini in third. The unplaced runners included Bleu et Rouge (Deloitte Novice Hurdle) and Agrapart (Betfair Hurdle). At the end of the season he was bought privately by J P McManus.

=== 2016/2017 National Hunt season ===
Buveur d'Air began the 2016/2017 National Hunt season by competing in novice chases. On his debut over fences at Haydock Park on 17 December he was ridden by Aidan Coleman and won "easily" by three and a quarter lengths from Cloudy Dream. He followed up two weeks later at Warwick Racecourse, taking the lead on the run-in and winning by two and a quarter lengths from Gino Trail at odds of 30/100.

With several leading hurdlers being injured and the Henderson-trained Altior dominating the novice chase division it was decided to return Buveur d'Air to the smaller obstacles for the remainder of the season. In the Contenders Hurdle at Sandown Park Racecourse he was partnered by Barry Geraghty and went off at odds of 1/4 against three opponents headed by the dual Fighting Fifth Hurdle winner Irving. After racing in fourth place for most of the way he "cruised" into the lead on the run-in and won by one and a half lengths from Rayvin Black.

In the 2017 Champion Hurdle at Cheltenham on 14 March Buveur d'Air started the 5/1 second favourite behind the Christmas Hurdle winner Yanworth. The other nine runners included Petit Mouchoir (winner of the Irish Champion Hurdle), Brain Power (Wessex Youth Trust Handicap Hurdle), The New One, My Tent Or Yours, Footpad (Prix Alain du Breil, Prix Renaud de Vivier) and Wicklow Brave (Irish St. Leger). Ridden by Fehily Buveur d'Air settled in mid-division as Petit Mouchoir set the pace, and moved into contention after the fifth flight. He overtook Petit Mouchoir approaching the final obstacle and drew away on the run-in to win by four and a half lengths. My Tent Or Yours stayed on to take second ahead of Petit Mouchoir, Footpad and The New One. In the Aintree Hurdle over two and a half miles in April, the gelding was partnered by Geraghty and was made the 4/9 favourite against five opponents. After tracking the leaders he went to the front approaching the final flight and drew clear to win by five lengths from My Tent Or Yours with The New One coming home in third. After the race McManus commented "It doesn’t get much better than that. I can’t remember what Nicky said when he wanted to return Buveur D’Air to hurdles but he said it more than once. He was pretty insistent and in the end we let him have his way. He was sure he wanted to give him a shot even before Faugheen and Annie Power were declared non-runners. He's a top man and sometimes you have to go along with it".

=== 2017/2018 National Hunt season ===
Buveur d'Air was ridden by Geraghty in all four of his races in the 2017/2018 National Hunt season. He began his campaign in the Fighting Fifth Hurdle at Newcastle Racecourse on 2 December and won in a "canter" by five lengths from Irving after taking the lead three hurdles from the finish. Only three horses took the field against the champion in the Christmas Hurdle at Kempton Park Racecourse 24 days later and The New One was the only one of the trio given any serious chance of causing an upset. Starting at odds of 2/11, Buveur d'Air raced in second before overtaking The New One at the last and "cruised" away to win by two and a quarter lengths.

As in 2017, Buveur d'Air prepared for the Cheltenham Festival with a run in the Contenders Hurdle and started at 1/16 against two opponents. He led from the start, went clear after the second last hurdle and was eased down on the run-in only to be challenged by the Swinton Handicap Hurdle winner John Constable, leaving Geraghty needing to drive the favourite out to win by one and three quarter lengths.

On 13 March 2017 Buveur d'Air attempted to repeat his 2017 success in the Champion Hurdle and was made the 4/6 favourite. His ten opponents included Faugheen, Melon (WKD Hurdle), Elgin (Kingwell Hurdle), Wicklow Brave, Yorkhill (Baring Bingham Novices' Hurdle) and John Constable. The favourite raced in third as his stablemate Charlie Parcs set the pace from Faugheen and moved up to take the lead at the second last. He was immediately joined by Melon and the pair engaged in a sustained struggle up the straight before Buveur d'Air gained the advantage in the final strides and prevailed by a neck. Geraghty commented "There was nowhere to hide. The best horse was going to win and, thankfully, I was on the best horse. You don't win these back to back unless you are very good and he's won everything all season. He scrapped it out today. He's been flashy all season because he hasn't had to deal with much but today he had the opposition and he lived up to it. It was a proper race and the runner-up put it up but my fella is battle-hardened and tough as nails".

=== 2018/2019 National Hunt season ===
As in 2017, Buveur d'Air began his campaign in the Fighting Fifth Hurdle, a race which saw him matched at against two of the previous season's outstanding novices Samcro (Baring Bingham Novices' Hurdle) and Summerville Boy (Supreme Novices' Hurdle). He raced in second place behind Samcro before taking the lead at the final hurdle and accelerating away to win by eight lengths in "impressive" style. The gelding started at odds of 1/4 when he attempted to repeat his 2017 success in the Christmas Hurdle and looked likely to win when he took the lead at the second last. On the run-in however, he was strongly challenged by his stablemate Verdana Blue and beaten a short head into second place.

On 2 February Buveur d'Air attempted to win the Contenders Hurdle for the third time and went off at odds of 1/5 against four opponents. He led for most of the way before accelerating away from his rivals on the run in and winning by two lengths from Vision des Flos, having been eased down by Geraghty in the final strides. At the Cheltenham Festival, Buveur d'Air attempted to emulate Hatton's Grace, Sir Ken, Persian War, See You Then and Istabraq by winning the Champion Hurdle for the third time. Starting at odds of 11/4 he was tracking the leaders when he fell for the first time in his racing career at the third hurdle. He apparently suffered no ill effects as he continued riderless, crossing the line alongside the winner Espoir d'Allen.

Buveur d'Air's next race, on 4 April, was the Aintree Hurdle, which he had won two years previously. He went off at 5/6 favourite but could only manage second place to Supasundae, beaten one and a quarter lengths. He ended the season by winning the Punchestown Champion Hurdle, beating Supasundae by two and a half lengths. On this occasion he was ridden by Davy Russell as both his regular jockey Barry Geraghty and replacement Mark Walsh were injured.

=== 2019/2020 National Hunt season ===
Buveur d'Air began the season with an attempt to win the Fighting Fifth Hurdle for the third year running but was beaten a short head by Cornerstone Lad. He finished the race lame, having sustained an injury when he hit the second last and a large splinter of wood went into his hoof. The injury required surgery and prevented him from racing for the rest of the season.

=== 2020/2021 National Hunt season ===
On 23 January Buveur d'Air had his first race since his injury nearly fourteen months previously. Partnered by Nico de Boinville (as Barry Geraghty had retired), he started 8/11 favourite of three runners in the Champion Hurdle Trial Race at Haydock but could manage only second place, beaten four and a quarter lengths by Navajo Pass. Trainer Nicky Henderson remained upbeat in spite of the defeat: "The ground is not for him, but he's done well. His jumping was as good as ever and he's so slick and quick, and he's jumped every hurdle. I would expect him to come on hugely and we'll definitely go straight to the Champion Hurdle." In the event, Buveur d'Air missed Cheltenham and his next race was the Aintree Hurdle, where he came fourth of eleven runners, having been hampered by a loose horse three out when in the lead.

== Pedigree ==
Pedigree of Buveur d'Air (FR), bay gelding, 2011
| Sire Crillon (FR) 1996 | Saumarez (GB); 1987 | Rainbow Quest | Blushing Groom |
| Sire Crillon (FR) 1996 | Saumarez (GB); 1987 | Rainbow Quest | I Will Follow |
| Sire Crillon (FR) 1996 | Saumarez (GB); 1987 | Fiesta Fun | Welsh Pageant |
| Sire Crillon (FR) 1996 | Saumarez (GB); 1987 | Fiesta Fun | Natigua |
| Sire Crillon (FR) 1996 | Shangrila (FR); 1978 | Riverman | Never Bend |
| Sire Crillon (FR) 1996 | Shangrila (FR); 1978 | Riverman | River Lady |
| Sire Crillon (FR) 1996 | Shangrila (FR); 1978 | Garden Green | Pinturischio |
| Sire Crillon (FR) 1996 | Shangrila (FR); 1978 | Garden Green | Focal |
| Dam History (FR) 1995 | Alesso (USA); 1963 | Alleged | Hoist The Flag |
| Dam History (FR) 1995 | Alesso (USA); 1963 | Alleged | Princess Pout |
| Dam History (FR) 1995 | Alesso (USA); 1963 | Leandra | Luthier |
| Dam History (FR) 1995 | Alesso (USA); 1963 | Leandra | Ady Endre |
| Dam History (FR) 1995 | Clair Deux Lune (FR); 1990 | Altayan | Posse |
| Dam History (FR) 1995 | Clair Deux Lune (FR); 1990 | Altayan | Aleema |
| Dam History (FR) 1995 | Clair Deux Lune (FR); 1990 | Lili Dancer | Evainqueur (SF) |
| Dam History (FR) 1995 | Clair Deux Lune (FR); 1990 | Lili Dancer | Keen Dancer (Family 3-n) |
