= 2017 Champion Hurdle =

Horse race

87th Champion Hurdle
- Champion Hurdle
- Location: Cheltenham Racecourse
- Date: 14 March 2017
- Winning horse: Buveur d'Air
- Jockey: Noel Fehily
- Trainer: Nicky Henderson

The 2017 Champion Hurdle was a horse race held at Cheltenham Racecourse on Tuesday 14 March 2017. It was the 87th running of the Champion Hurdle.

Eleven horses started the race. The winner of the race was Buveur d'Air, a six year old French-bred British-trained racehorse ridden by Noel Fehily and trained by Nicky Henderson. The 5/1 winner was the 50th winner at Cheltenham for owner JP McManus.

== The Runners ==
Yanworth was sent off as the 2/1 favourite after displaying the best form over 2 miles of the British contenders throughout the season, winning the Christmas Hurdle by over 3 lengths from The New One (10/1) who in turn was having his 4th consecutive attempt of winning the race. Petit Mouchoir (6/1) was representative of the Irish best hope coming on the back of two Grade 1s including the Irish Champion Hurdle in which Footpad (14/1) finished only 1 length in second and was the choice of Ruby Walsh in this race from the Willie Mullins yard who had left home with injuries both of the previous Champion Hurdle winners in Annie Power (2016) and Faugheen (2015). Trainer Nicky Henderson took advantage of the situation at the head of the market and changed the plans of his horse Buveur D'Air (5/1) at the end of January which started the season over fences but had good credentials over hurdles after placing third in a very competitive renewal of last season's Supreme Novices' Hurdle.

The rest of the contenders included Brain Power (13/2) who was coming on back of two handicap wins but hadn't had a prep race during the current calendar year, same as My Tent Or Yours (16/1) who last ran in December a distant fourth to Yanworth in the Christmas Hurdle and was also beaten by The New One in his previous outing for the Bula Hurdle but had a good record in the Champion Hurdle coming 2nd the previous two times he ran in it. Sceau Royal (25/1), Wicklow Brave (22/1) and Cyrus Darius (50/1) represented the outsiders of the field.

== The Race ==
Buveur d'Air settled in mid-division as Petit Mouchoir set the early pace, and moved into contention after the fifth flight. He overtook Petit Mouchoir approaching the final obstacle and drew away on the run-in to win by four and a half lengths. My Tent Or Yours stayed on to take second ahead of Petit Mouchoir, Footpad and The New One. Yanworth started as the 2/1 favourite but never settled and finished seventh.

== Race details ==
- Sponsor: Stan James
- Purse:
- Going: Good to Soft
- Distance: 2 miles 87 yards
- Number of runners: 11
- Winner's time: 3m 50.90s

== Full result ==
Pos.	Marg.	Horse (bred)	Age	Jockey	Trainer (Country)	Odds
1		Buveur D'Air (FR)	6	Noel Fehily	Nicky Henderson (GB)	5/1
2	4 1/2	My Tent Or Yours (IRE)	10	Aidan Coleman	Nicky Henderson (GB)	16/1
3	3	Petit Mouchoir (FR)	6	Bryan Cooper	Henry de Bromhead (IRE)	6/1
4	3	Footpad (FR)	5	Ruby Walsh	Willie Mullins (IRE)	14/1
5	shd	The New One (IRE)	9	Sam Twiston-Davies	Nigel Twiston-Davies (GB)	10/1
6	2 3/4	Sceau Royal (FR)	5	Daryl Jacob	Alan King (GB)	25/1
7	1/2	Yanworth (GB)	7	Mark Walsh	Alan King (GB)	2/1F
8	3/4	Wicklow Brave (GB)	8	Paul Townend	Willie Mullins (IRE)	22/1
9	15	Brain Power (IRE)	6	David Mullins	Nicky Henderson (GB)	13/2
10	14	Cyrus Darius (GB)	8	Brian Hughes	Malcolm Jefferson (GB)	50/1
PU		Moon Racer (IRE)	8	Tom Scudamore	David Pipe (GB)	10/1

- Abbreviations: nse = nose; nk = neck; shd = short head; hd = head; dist = distance; PU = pulled up
