= William Hill Hurdle =

Hurdle horse race in Britain

Betfair Hurdle
2026
Tutti Quanti	Wellington Arch	Faivoir

Previous years
2025
Joyeuse	Lump Sum	Navajo Indy
2024
Iberico Lord	L'eau Du Sud	Go Dante
2023
Aucunrisque	Filey Bay	Teddy Blue
2022
Glory And Fortune	I Like To Move It	First Street
2021
Soaring Glory	Fifty Ball	Edwardstone

2020-2011
2020
Pic D'Orhy	Ciel De Neige	Remiluc
2019
Al Dancer	Magic Dancer	Blu Cavalier
2018
Kalashnikov	Bleu Et Rouge	Spiritofthegames
2017
Ballyandy	Movewiththetimes	Clyne
2016
Agrapart	Starchitect	Flying Angel
2015
Violet Dancer	Cheltenian	Activial
2014
Splash of Ginge	Dell' Arca	Irish Saint
2013
My Tent Or Yours	Cotton Mill	Swing Bowler
2012
Zarkandar	Get Me Out of Here	Raya Star
2011
Recession Proof	Bothy	Notus De La Tour

2010-2001
2010
Get Me Out of Here	Ronaldo Des Mottes	Manyriverstocross
2008
Wingman	Punjabi	County Zen
2007
Heathcote	Overstrand	Pedrobob
2005
Essex	Bongo Fury	Al Eile
2004
Geos	Rooster Booster	Monkerhostin
2003
Spirit Leader	Non So	Tikram
2002
Copeland	Rooster Booster	Benbyas
2001
Landing Light	Rooster Booster	Milligan

2000-1991
2000
Geos	Copeland	Hit And Run
1999
Decoupage	City Hall	Sadler's Realm
1998
Sharpical	Kerawi	Tidjani
1997
Make A Stand	Hamilton Silk	Direct Route
1996
Squire Silk	Romancer	Non Vintage
1995
Mysilv	Trying Again	Pridwell
1994
Large Action	Jazilah	Glenstal Flagship
1993
King Credo	Native Mission	Bitofabanter
1992
Rodeo Star	Native Mission	Egypt Mill Prince

1990-1988
1990
Deep Sensation	Joyful Noise	Imperial Brush
1989
Grey Salute	Vicario Di Bray	Cashew King
1988
Jamesmead	Buck Up	High Knowl

The William Hill Hurdle is a Premier Handicap National Hunt hurdle race in Great Britain which is open to horses aged four years or older. It is run at Newbury over a distance of about 2 miles and ½ furlong (2 miles and 69 yards, or 3,282 metres), and during its running there are eight hurdles to be jumped. It is a handicap race, and it is scheduled to take place each year in February. It currently has a maximum field of 24 runners.

The event was established in 1963, and the inaugural running took place at Aintree. The race was originally sponsored by Schweppes, and it was known as the Schweppes Gold Trophy. Ryan Price won the first two runnings with Rosyth and trained four of the first five winners of the race. After Rosyth's second win, following four unplaced efforts in between, his jockey was suspended for six weeks and his trainer warned off. More controversy for Price and the Schweppes followed in 1967 when Hill House tested positive for a banned drug. However it was later shown that Hill House had manufactured his own cortisol.

Schweppes' sponsorship continued until 1986 when it was taken over by Tote Bookmakers (later known as totesport). The race was titled the Tote Gold Trophy from 1987 to 2004, and the totesport Trophy from 2005 to 2011. From 2012 to 2024 the race was sponsored by Betfair and known as the Betfair Hurdle. William Hill took over the sponsorship from the 2025 running.

Two winners of the race – Persian War and Make a Stand – subsequently achieved victory in the following month's Champion Hurdle. Persian War holds the weight carrying record for the race when winning as a 5 year old in 1968 with 11 stones 13 pounds on his back.

== Winners ==
- Weights given in stones and pounds.

Year	Winner	Age	Weight	Jockey	Trainer
1963	Rosyth (Note: The 1963 running took place at Aintree)	5	10-00	Josh Gifford	Ryan Price
1964	Rosyth	6	10-02	Josh Gifford	Ryan Price
1965	Elan	6	10-07	David Nicholson	John Sutcliffe, jnr
1966	Le Vermontois	5	11-03	Josh Gifford	Ryan Price
1967	Hill House	7	10-10	Josh Gifford	Ryan Price
1968	Persian War	5	11–13	Jimmy Uttley	Colin Davies
1969	Abandoned because of frost
1970	Abandoned because of snow and frost
1971	Cala Mesquida	7	10-09	John Cook	John Sutcliffe
1972	Good Review	6	10-09	Val O'Brien	Jim Dreaper (Ir)
1973	Indianapolis	6	10-06	Jeff King	John Sutcliffe
1974	Abandoned because of waterlogged state of course
1975	Tammuz	7	10–13	Bill Smith	Fulke Walwyn
1976	Irish Fashion	5	10-04	Ron Barry	Michael Cunningham
1977	True Lad	7	10-04	Tommy Stack	W Swainson
1978	Abandoned because of frost
1979	Within The Law	5	11-04	Alan Brown	Peter Easterby
1980	Bootlaces	6	10-09	Paul Leach	David Barons
1981	Abandoned because of frost
1982	Donegal Prince	6	10-08	John Francome	Paul Kelleway
	no race 1983 (Note: The 1983 running was abandoned due to snow and frost)
1984	Ra Nova	5	10-06	Paddy Farrell	Nan Kennedy
	no race 1985–86 (Note: It was cancelled in 1985 because of snow and frost, and in 1986 because of snow)
1987	Neblin	8	10-00	Stan Moore	Toby Balding
1988	Jamesmead	7	10-00	Brendan Powell	David Elsworth
1989	Grey Salute	6	11-05	Richard Dunwoody	John Jenkins
1990	Deep Sensation	5	11-03	Richard Rowe	Josh Gifford
	no race 1991 (Note: The 1991 and 2006 editions were both abandoned due to frost)
1992	Rodeo Star	6	10-10	Graham McCourt	Nigel Tinkler
1993	King Credo	8	10-00	Adrian Maguire	Steve Woodman
1994	Large Action	6	10-08	Jamie Osborne	Oliver Sherwood
1995	Mysilv	5	10-08	Jamie Osborne	Charles Egerton
1996	Squire Silk	7	10–12	Paul Carberry	Andrew Turnell
1997	Make A Stand	6	11-07	Chris Maude	Martin Pipe
1998	Sharpical	6	11-01	Mick Fitzgerald	Nicky Henderson
1999	Decoupage	7	11-00	Jimmy McCarthy	Charles Egerton
2000	Geos	5	11-03	Mick Fitzgerald	Nicky Henderson
2001	Landing Light	6	10-02	Mick Fitzgerald	Nicky Henderson
2002	Copeland	7	11-07	Tony McCoy	Martin Pipe
2003	Spirit Leader	7	10-00	Norman Williamson	Jessica Harrington
2004	Geos	9	10-09	Marcus Foley	Nicky Henderson
2005	Essex	5	11-06	Barry Geraghty	Michael O'Brien
	no race 2006
2007	Heathcote	5	10-06	Jamie Moore	Gary Moore
2008	Wingman	6	10-00	Jamie Moore	Gary Moore
	no race 2009 (Note: The 2009 race was cancelled because of snow)
2010	Get Me Out of Here	6	10-06	Tony McCoy	Jonjo O'Neill
2011	Recession Proof	5	10-08	Dougie Costello	John Quinn
2012	Zarkandar	5	11-01	Ruby Walsh	Paul Nicholls
2013	My Tent Or Yours	6	11-02	Tony McCoy	Nicky Henderson
2014	Splash of Ginge	6	10-10	Ryan Hatch	Nigel Twiston-Davies
2015	Violet Dancer	5	10-09	Josh Moore	Gary Moore
2016	Agrapart	5	10-05	Lizzie Kelly	Nick Williams
2017	Ballyandy	6	11-01	Sam Twiston-Davies	Nigel Twiston-Davies
2018	Kalashnikov	5	11-05	Jack Quinlan	Amy Murphy
2019	Al Dancer (Note: The 2019 race took place at Ascot after the original Newbury fixture was cancelled because of an equine influenza outbreak)	6	11-08	Sam Twiston-Davies	Nigel Twiston-Davies
2020	Pic D’Orhy	5	11-05	Harry Cobden	Paul Nicholls
2021	Soaring Glory	6	10-07	Jonjo O'Neill Jr	Jonjo O'Neill
2022	Glory and Fortune	7	11-08	Stan Sheppard	Tom Lacey
2023	Aucunrisque	7	11-04	Nick Scholfield	Chris Gordon
2024	Iberico Lord	6	11-08	Nico de Boinville	Nicky Henderson
2025	Joyeuse	6	10-07	Nico de Boinville	Nicky Henderson
2026	Tutti Quanti	6	12-00	Harry Cobden	Paul Nicholls

== See also ==
- Horse racing in Great Britain
- List of British National Hunt races
- Recurring sporting events established in 1963 – the Betfair Hurdle is included under its original title, Schweppes Gold Trophy.
