= Landing Light =

Irish-bred Thoroughbred racehorse

- Sire: In The Wings
- Grandsire: Sadler's Wells
- Dam: Gay Hellene
- Damsire: Ela-Mana-Mou
- Sex: Gelding
- Foaled: 9 May 1995
- Country: Ireland
- Colour: Bay
- Breeder: Ballymacoll Stud
- Owner: Arnold Weinstock; Mr & Mrs John Poynton
- Trainer: Roger Charlton; David Smaga; Nicky Henderson
- Record: 22:9-3-1
- Earnings: £308,650

Major wins
- Tote Gold Trophy (2001); Championship Hurdle (2001); Fighting Fifth Hurdle (2001); Christmas Hurdle (2001); Cesarewitch Handicap (2003)

Landing Light (foaled 9 May 1995) was an Irish-bred Thoroughbred racehorse. Originally trained on the flat in France he was later transferred to England where he excelled in hurdle races. In 2001 he was arguably the best hurdler in Britain, winning the Tote Gold Trophy, Championship Hurdle (a substitute Champion Hurdle), Fighting Fifth Hurdle and Christmas Hurdle. He failed to reproduce his best form in subsequent National Hunt campaigns, but returned to the flat as an eight-year-old in 2003 and won the Cesarewitch Handicap on his final racecourse appearance.

== Background ==
Landing Light was a bay horse with a white star bred in Ireland by the Ballymacoll Stud. He was sired by In The Wings, the British-bred, French-trained winner of the 1990 Breeders' Cup Turf. As a breeding stallion, his other progeny included the multiple Group One winner Singspiel and the outstanding long distance hurdler Inglis Drever. His dam Gay Hellene was a successful racemare who won the Prix de Flore and was rated 111 by Timeform in 1985. Gay Hellene was a daughter of the Irish 1,000 Guineas winner Gaily, whose other descendants have included Pilsudski

Landing Light was sent into training with Roger Charlton at Beckhampton, but was transferred to the stable of David Smaga in France before his racecourse debut.

== Racing career ==
=== 1998: three-year-old season ===
Landing Light contested four races as a three-year-old in France in 1998, ridden on each occasion by Dominique Boeuf. After finishing second on his racecourse debut at Chantilly Racecourse on 3 May he recorded his first victory at Maisons-Laffitte Racecourse in June staying on in the closing stage to win by a head from Musgrave over 2000 metres. He finished ninth in the Listed Prix Pelleas at Maisons-Laffitte later in June and did not reappear until October, when he finished seventh in the Listed Prix Vulcan at Saint-Cloud Racecourse

=== 2000/2001 National Hunt season ===
Landing Light did not race in 1999 and was moved to the stable of Nicky Henderson at Upper Lambourn to be prepared for a career in National Hunt racing. He made his first appearance over obstacles in a novice hurdle at Wincanton Racecourse on 24 February 2000. Ridden by Mick Fitzgerald, he started at odds of 9/2 in a seventeen-runner field and won by six lengths from Salford Flyer. After this race he was sold privately to Mr and Mrs John Poynton.

Having won his only previous hurdle race, Landing Light was no longer eligible to compete in novice events when the new season began in the autumn of 2000 and had to race against much more experienced opponents. In December, he started 2/1 second favourite for the Knights Royal Hurdle at Ascot Racecourse and finished third, twenty lengths behind the French-bred Valiramix. On 27 January, he carried a weight of 154 pounds in the Letheby & Christopher Hurdle at Cheltenham Racecourse and started 6/1 second favourite against sixteen opponents. He was restrained by Fitzgerald in the early stages before moving up to take the lead approaching the last hurdle. He stayed on well in the closing stages to win by six lengths from La Landiere. Henderson praised Fitzgerald for giving the horse "a very good educational ride" but some observers criticised the winner for his tendency to carry his head at a high angle. Two weeks later he was made 4/1 favourite for the Grade III Tote Gold Trophy, the most valuable handicap hurdle in Europe at Newbury Racecourse in which he carried 142 pounds. Fitzgerald repeated the tactics employed at Cheltenham, holding the gelding up in the early stages before moving up to take the lead after the second last and won by three lengths from Rooster Booster.

The 2001 Cheltenham Festival was postponed and then cancelled owing to an outbreak of foot-and-mouth disease. Landing Light reappeared at the Grand National meeting at Aintree Racecourse in April but ran very poorly and was pulled up before the second last in the Aintree Hurdle which was won by Barton. At the end of April Sandown Racecourse staged a series of races intended as substitutes for the major races lost as a result Cheltenham's cancellation including the Grade I Championship Hurdle, a substitute for the Champion Hurdle. As Mick Fitzgerald opted to ride Geos, Richard Johnson took the ride on Landing Light, who started a 12/1 outsider in a field of nine which also included Barton, Valiramix, Hors La Loi III and the French-trained favourite Bilboa. The race's status as a championship event was undermined by the lack of Irish challengers, notably Istabraq who had won the last three Champion Hurdles. In a change of tactics, Landing Light raced in second place behind Teaatral before taking the lead approaching the second last hurdle. He went clear of his rivals at the last and won by three lengths from Geos.

=== 2001/2002 National Hunt season ===
On his first appearance of the new season, Landing Light was sent to Newcastle Racecourse on 1 December for the Fighting Fifth Hurdle which was then a Grade II race. Starting the 4/5 favourite, he took the lead at the second last and repelled the renewed challenge of The French Furze to win by a length. At the Boxing Day meeting at Kempton Park Racecourse he faced Bilboa, Hors La Loi III and Azertyuiop in the Grade I Christmas Hurdle. Starting the 5/4 favourite, he appeared to be struggling three hurdles out but rallied to take the lead at the next obstacle. He went clear of the field at the last and won by two and a half lengths from Bilboa, despite being eased down by Fitzgerald in the closing stages.

On 12 March 2012, Landing Light made his first appearance at the Cheltenham Festival and started 100/30 third favourite behind Istabraq and Valiramix for the Champion Hurdle. After being hampered at the second last he stayed on in the closing stages but was never able to reach the lead and finished fifth, four lengths behind the winner Hors La Loi III. On his final appearance of the season he was sent to Ireland for the Grade I Punchestown Champion Hurdle on 26 April but ran poorly, finishing last of the six runners behind Davenport Milenium.

=== 2002/2003 National Hunt season ===
Landing Light failed to win in four races during the 2002/2003 National Hunt season. On his seasonal debut in November he made no impact when finishing tailed off in last place behind Baracouda in the Ascot Hurdle. Three weeks later he produced his best effort of the season when he finished second to Rooster Booster, to whom he was conceding four pounds, in the Bula Hurdle at Cheltenham. He finished seventh behind Rooster Booster at level weights in the Champion Hurdle in March and fourth behind Deano's Beeno over three miles at Ascot in April.

=== 2003: eight-year-old (flat) season ===
Henderson felt that Landing Light was "starting to get a bit tired of jumping and maybe a bit knowing" and decided to campaign the horse on the flat in 2003. Four and a half years after finishing unplaced at Saint-Cloud, Landing Light returned to flat racing at York Racecourse in May 2003. Assigned top weight of 140 pounds and ridden by Kieren Fallon, he started a 25/1 outsider for a handicap race over fourteen furlongs. He made steady progress in the straight to take the lead near the finish and won by half a length from the Michael Jarvis-trained Hambleden. The gelding was again given top weight of 140 pounds when he started at odds of 7/1 for the Ascot Stakes over two and a half miles at Royal Ascot and finished second of the twenty-seven runners behind Sindapour. On 28 June, Landing Light started the 9/2 favourite for the Northumberland Plate at Newcastle, but finished tenth behind Unleash.

After a break of more than three and a half months, Landing Light returned in the Cesarewitch Handicap over two and a quarter miles at Newmarket Racecourse in October. Ridden by the veteran Pat Eddery, who had never won the race, he carried 130 pounds and started at odds of 12/1 in a field of thirty-six runners. Eddery held the horse up in the early stages before moving forward three furlongs from the finish. He took the lead approaching the final furlong and won by two and a half lengths from the Scottish challenger Sun Bird. After the race, Eddery, who had already announced that he would retire at the end of the season, said "I'd tried to win it for the last 25 years and been placed in it quite a bit but never actually won it. It's hard to get on the right horse but luckily I was on the right one". Landing Light suffered from leg problems in the later part of 2003 and missed all of the 2004/2005 season. He was officially retired from racing in July 2005.

== Pedigree ==
Pedigree of Landing Light (IRE), bay gelding, 1995
| Sire In the Wings (GB) 1986 | Sadler's Wells (USA); 1981 | Northern Dancer | Nearctic |
| Sire In the Wings (GB) 1986 | Sadler's Wells (USA); 1981 | Northern Dancer | Natalma |
| Sire In the Wings (GB) 1986 | Sadler's Wells (USA); 1981 | Fairy Bridge | Bold Reason |
| Sire In the Wings (GB) 1986 | Sadler's Wells (USA); 1981 | Fairy Bridge | Special |
| Sire In the Wings (GB) 1986 | High Hawk (IRE); 1980 | Shirley Heights | Mill Reef |
| Sire In the Wings (GB) 1986 | High Hawk (IRE); 1980 | Shirley Heights | Hardiemma |
| Sire In the Wings (GB) 1986 | High Hawk (IRE); 1980 | Sunbittern | Sea Hawk |
| Sire In the Wings (GB) 1986 | High Hawk (IRE); 1980 | Sunbittern | Pantoufle |
| Dam Gay Hellene (IRE) 1982 | Ela-Mana-Mou (IRE); 1976 | Pitcairn | Petingo |
| Dam Gay Hellene (IRE) 1982 | Ela-Mana-Mou (IRE); 1976 | Pitcairn | Border Bounty |
| Dam Gay Hellene (IRE) 1982 | Ela-Mana-Mou (IRE); 1976 | Rose Bertin | High Hat |
| Dam Gay Hellene (IRE) 1982 | Ela-Mana-Mou (IRE); 1976 | Rose Bertin | Wide Awake |
| Dam Gay Hellene (IRE) 1982 | Gaily (USA); 1971 | Sir Gaylord | Turn-To |
| Dam Gay Hellene (IRE) 1982 | Gaily (USA); 1971 | Sir Gaylord | Somethingroyal |
| Dam Gay Hellene (IRE) 1982 | Gaily (USA); 1971 | Spearfish | Fleet Nasrullah |
| Dam Gay Hellene (IRE) 1982 | Gaily (USA); 1971 | Spearfish | Alabama Gal (Family: 11) |
