= Knights Royal Hurdle =

Knights Royal Hurdle
2000
Valiramix	Scarlet Pimpernel	Landing Light

Previous years
1999
Blue Royal	Sir Talbot	Rainbow Frontier
1998
Toto Toscato	City Hall	Makounji
1997
Mr Markham	Sharpical	I'm Supposin
1996
Mistinguett	Eskimo Nel	Mr Percy
1995
Pridwell	Mysilv	Kadastrof
1994
Relkeel	Holy Wanderer	Ground Nut
1993
Absalom's Lady	Satin Lover	Kilcash
1992
Baydon Star	Corrin Hill	Flown
1990
Wonder Man	Stratford Ponds	Vayrua
1989
Forest Sun	Calapaez	Nodform
1988
Celtic Chief	Calapaez	Jazetas
1987
Osric	Saffron Lord	Ghofar

The Knights Royal Hurdle is a National Hunt hurdle race in England which is open to horses aged four or five years. It was run at Ascot over a distance of 2 miles (3,218 metres), and was scheduled to take place each year in December.

The race was first run in 1965 and was last run in 2000.

The race was initially known as the Knights Royal Hurdle, but from 1972 it was known as the S.G.B. Hire Shops Hurdle, later changed to the H.S.S. Hire Shops Hurdle. The original name was re-adopted in 1993.

During the eighties and nineties, when it held Listed status, the race often attracted some of the best second season hurdlers.

== Winners ==
Year	Winner	Age	Jockey	Trainer
1965	Compton Martin	6	Stan Mellor	G Todd
1966	Abandoned because of waterlogged state of course
1967	Abandoned because of foot and mouth epidemic
1968	Abandoned because of waterlogged state of course
1969	Moyne Royal	4	Brian Leyman	Reg Akehurst
1970	Bowie's Brig	4	Barry Brogan	Arthur Pitt
1971	Flower Picker	5	Aly Branford	Fulke Walwyn
1972	Ruisselet	5	Paul Kelleway	Ryan Price
1973	Lanzarote	5	Richard Pitman	Fred Winter
1974	Tree Tangle	5	Andy Turnell	Bob Turnell
1975	Grand Canyon	5	Peter Haynes	Derek Kent
1976	Abandoned because of frost
1977	Kybo	4	Gerry Enright	Josh Gifford
1978	Kybo	5	Bob Champion	Josh Gifford
1979	Walnut Wonder	4	Lorna Vincent	Les Kennard
1980	Heighlin	4	Steve Jobar	David Elsworth
1981	Abandoned because of snow
1982	Carved Opal	4	Colin Brown	Fred Winter
1983	Admiral's Cup	5	John Francome	Fred Winter
1984	See You Then	4	John Francome	Nicky Henderson
1985	First Bout	4	Steve Smith Eccles	Nicky Henderson
1986	Nohalmdun	5	Peter Scudamore	Peter Easterby
1987	Osric	4	Graham McCourt	Mick Ryan
1988	Celtic Chief	5	Richard Dunwoody	Mrs Mercy Rimell
1989	Forest Sun	4	Jimmy Frost	Toby Balding
1990	Wonder Man	5	Mark Pitman	Jenny Pitman
1991	Abandoned because of frost
1992	Baydon Star	5	Richard Dunwoody	David Nicholson
1993	Absalom's Lady	5	Paul Holley	David Elsworth
1994	Relkeel	5	Adrian Maguire	David Nicholson
1995	Pridwell	5	Tony McCoy	Martin Pipe
1996	Mistinguett	4	Carl Llewellyn	Nigel Twiston-Davies
1997	Mr Markham	5	Philip Hide	Josh Gifford
1998	Toto Toscato	4	Adrian Maguire	David Nicholson
1999	Blue Royal	4	Mick Fitzgerald	Nicky Henderson
2000	Valiramix	4	Tony McCoy	Martin Pipe
