= Harchibald =

French-bred Thoroughbred racehorse (1999–2024)

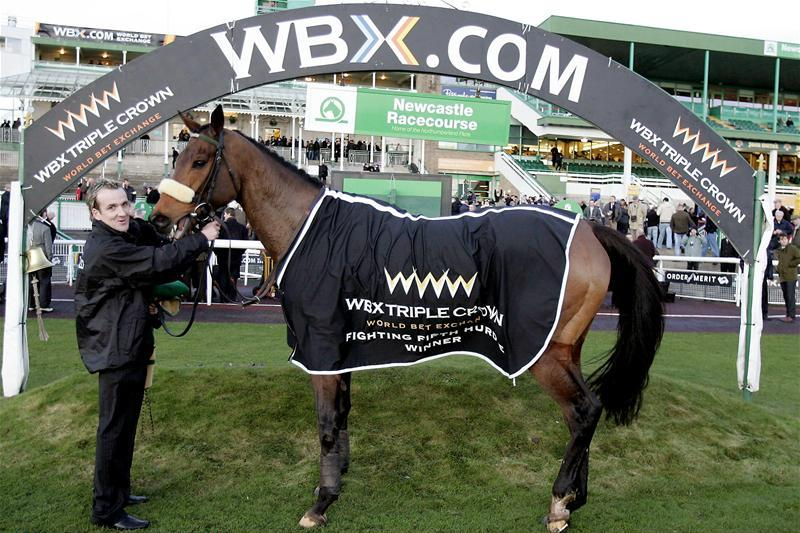
- Harchibald after winning the 2007 Fighting Fifth Hurdle
- Sire: Perugino
- Grandsire: Danzig
- Dam: Dame D’Harvard
- Damsire: Quest for Fame
- Sex: Gelding
- Foaled: February 1999
- Died: May 2024 (aged 25)
- Country: France
- Colour: Bay
- Breeder: S N C Ecurie, Jean-Lo Bouchard
- Owner: DP Sharkey
- Trainer: Noel Meade
- Record: 48:14-11-5
- Earnings: £555,584

Major wins
- Fighting Fifth Hurdle (2004, 2007); Christmas Hurdle (2004, 2008); John James McManus Memorial Hurdle (2005)

Harchibald (February 1999 – May 2024) was a French-bred, Irish-trained thoroughbred racehorse who won four Grade 1 races over hurdles.

== Background ==
Harchibald was sired by the stallion Perugino out of the mare Dame D’Harvard. He was owned by DP Sharkey, trained by Noel Meade and predominantly ridden by Paul Carberry.

== Racing career ==
Harchibald started racing on the flat as a three-year-old in February 2002 and won his first race, the Prix Sengali-Carnaval. After a further nine races, including two wins, he moved to the yard of Meade in Ireland to begin his career in National Hunt racing. He won on his first outing over hurdles in December 2002. He achieved his first victory in a graded race came in November 2004 at Punchestown Racecourse when he won the Grade 2 Morgiana Hurdle, ridden by Carberry. Two weeks later, Harchibald and jockey Carberry won the 2004 Fighting Fifth Hurdle at Newcastle Racecourse beating Inglis Drever by two lengths. In December 2004 they won the Christmas Hurdle, beating Rooster Booster by two and a half lengths. Had Harchibald gone on to win the Champion Hurdle at the 2005 Cheltenham Festival, he would have become just the second horse since Kribensis in 1989–90 to win the Fighting Fifth Hurdle, Christmas Hurdle, and Champion Hurdle in the same racing season. However, Harchibald did not win the race, instead losing to Hardy Eustace by a neck.

Harchibald went on to post wins in the 2007 Fighting Fifth Hurdle and the 2008 Christmas Hurdle – his second win for each race. His 2008 win at the Christmas Hurdle denied Punjabi a chance to win the £1,000,000 bonus put up by WBX for winning the Triple Crown of Hurdling.

During a career of nearly eight years, Harchibald ran in 48 races and tallied 14 wins, 11 second places and 5 third places, with five of his wins coming in Grade 1 races. Carberry was atop Harchibald for 9 of his 14 wins.

== Retirement and death ==
Harchibald was retired in December 2009. His last appearance on a racecourse was in a flat race at Dundalk in November 2009, while the previous month he had finished second to Sizing Europe in the Buck House Novice Chase at Punchestown, his only race over fences. He was to remain with his trainer Meade in Tu Va Stables near Navan, County Meath.

Harchibald died in May 2024, at the age of 25. His trainer said in the Racing Post: "Harchibald was the most wonderful horse. It's funny because he is more popular for the race he didn't win rather than all the races he did win. He didn't maybe do all the things we wanted him to do, but he did a lot of them. He gave us some fantastic days.... He was 25 and he enjoyed a wonderful retirement. Johnny Hurley looked after him since he retired and he treated him like a king."
