= Arcalis (disambiguation) =

Vallnord is a ski/snowboard resort in the Pyrenees mountains in the country of Andorra.

Arcalis may also refer to:

- Arcalis (region), mountain and ski area in the Ordino parish of Andorra
- Arcalís (star), Constellation Bootes; a K0-type subgiant star; a.k.a. BD+18°2957, HD 131496, HIP 72845
- Arcalis (horse) (born 2000), a British racehorse

== See also ==
- Arcadis, design and engineering company
- Arcanis, campaign setting for Dungeons & Dragons
