= 2026 Champion Hurdle =

Horse race at Cheltenham Racecourse, England

96th Champion Hurdle
- Champion Hurdle
- Location: Cheltenham Racecourse
- Date: 10 March 2026
- Winning horse: Lossiemouth
- Starting price: 7/5
- Jockey: Paul Townend
- Trainer: Willie Mullins
- Owner: Susannah Ricci
- Conditions: Good to Soft

The 2026 Champion Hurdle was a horse race held at Cheltenham Racecourse on Tuesday 10 March 2026. It was the 96th running of the Champion Hurdle.

The race was won by 7/5 favourite Lossiemouth, winning by six and half length, ridden by Paul Townend and trained by Willie Mullins.

Lossiemouth tracked Brighterdaysahead during the race before taking the lead on the home turn and finishing six and a half lengths clear of her old rival, with The New Lion in third place and defending champion Golden Ace in fifth. It was her fourth consecutive victory at the Cheltenham Festival and her tenth Grade 1 victory. "“To win the Champion Hurdle definitely outranks everything else she's done", said her trainer after the race.

Lossiemouth became the eighth mare to win the Champion Hurdle, following Golden Ace's victory in 2025.She had previously won the Triumph Hurdle in 2023 and the Mares' Hurdle in 2024 and 2025, giving her four consecutive victories at the Cheltenham Festival.

The remaining finishers were Alexei in fourth, defending champion Golden Ace in fifth, followed by Poniros, Anzadam, Tutti Quanti and Workahead.

The race, which is run on the first day of the Cheltenham Festival was shown live on ITV Racing.

== Race details ==
- Sponsor: Unibet
- Purse: £450,000
- Going:Good to Soft
- Distance:2 miles 87 yards
- Number of runners: 9
- Winner's time:3:54.24
- Winning margin: 6½ lengths
- Starting price: 7/5
- Winning jockey: Paul Townend
- Winning trainer: Willie Mullins
- Winning owner: Susannah Ricci
