= The French Furze =

Irish Thoroughbred racehorse

- The French Furze at the 2007 Fighting Fifth Hurdle
- Sire: Be My Guest
- Grandsire: Northern Dancer
- Dam: Exciting
- Damsire: Mill Reef
- Sex: Gelding
- Foaled: 1994
- Country: Ireland
- Colour: Chestnut
- Breeder: Stonethorn Stud Farms LTD
- Owner: Jim Ennis
- Trainer: Nicky Richards
- Record: 11-12-8
- Earnings: £232,499

Major wins
- Fighting Fifth Hurdle (2003)

The French Furze (foaled on 10 May 1994 in Ireland) is an Irish Thoroughbred racehorse, born to sire, Be My Guest and dam, Exciting. He is owned by Jim Ennis and was trained by Nicky Richards. Throughout his time as a racehorse, he was ridden by several famous jockeys, including Brian Harding, Tony Dobbin and Tony McCoy among others. At the time of his retirement, The French Furze had amassed a career record of 11 wins, 12 places and 8 shows while accumulating £232,499 in lifetime earnings.

The French Furze started racing as a two-year-old in September 1996 when he was entered into the Dance Design European Breeders Fund Maiden, finishing in seventh place out of 12 entries. He won his first race, the Gilane Amusements 3-Y-O Maiden Hurdle, in August 1997 at Tramore Racecourse in County Waterford, Tramore in Ireland. He beat a field of eight horses to earn his first victory. Early in his career, when The French Furze won a race, he would go on to win by impressive distances. His first seven victories were won by 10, 11, 14, 15, 4, 6, and 24 lengths respectively.

Although The French Furze won 11 races, his most notable win came late in his career in November 2003 when he won the Fighting Fifth Hurdle at Newcastle Racecourse in Newcastle, England. Entering the race as a 25 to 1 longshot, The French Furze and jockey Brian Harding bested a field of eight horses en route to a victory over Geos by three-quarters of a length.

In 2007, The French Furze’s achievements and seven consecutive entries into the Fighting Fifth Hurdle were honored when a race was named after him. The race, named the WBX French Furze Novices' Hurdle, spanned two and three-quarter miles and was run on 1 December 2007. The race was won by Tazbar, who defeated Innominate by an astounding 38 lengths.

The French Furze was retired at the age of 13 in December 2007 after a poor showing in the Fighting Fifth Hurdle. When asked about The French Furze, trainer Nicky Richards said: He has been a pleasure to train, but age has caught up with him. I owe him plenty as he was the horse who enabled me to rub shoulders with the big boys shortly after I started out. In all, The French Furze ran over 80 races in his career.
