= 2025 Champion Hurdle =

Horse race at Cheltenham Racecourse, England

95th Champion Hurdle
- Champion Hurdle
- Location: Cheltenham Racecourse
- Date: 11 March 2025
- Winning horse: Golden Ace
- Jockey: Lorcan Williams
- Trainer: Jeremy Scott
- Owner: Ian Gosden

The 2025 Champion Hurdle was a horse race held at Cheltenham Racecourse on Tuesday 11 March 2025. It was the 95th running of the Champion Hurdle.

The race was won by 25/1 Golden Ace, ridden by Lorcan Williams and trained by Jeremy Scott.

== Race details ==
- Sponsor: Unibet
- Purse: £450,000
- Going: Good to Soft
- Distance: 2 miles 87 yards
- Number of runners: 7
- Winner's time: 3.56.12
