= Christmas Hurdle =

Hurdle horse race in Britain

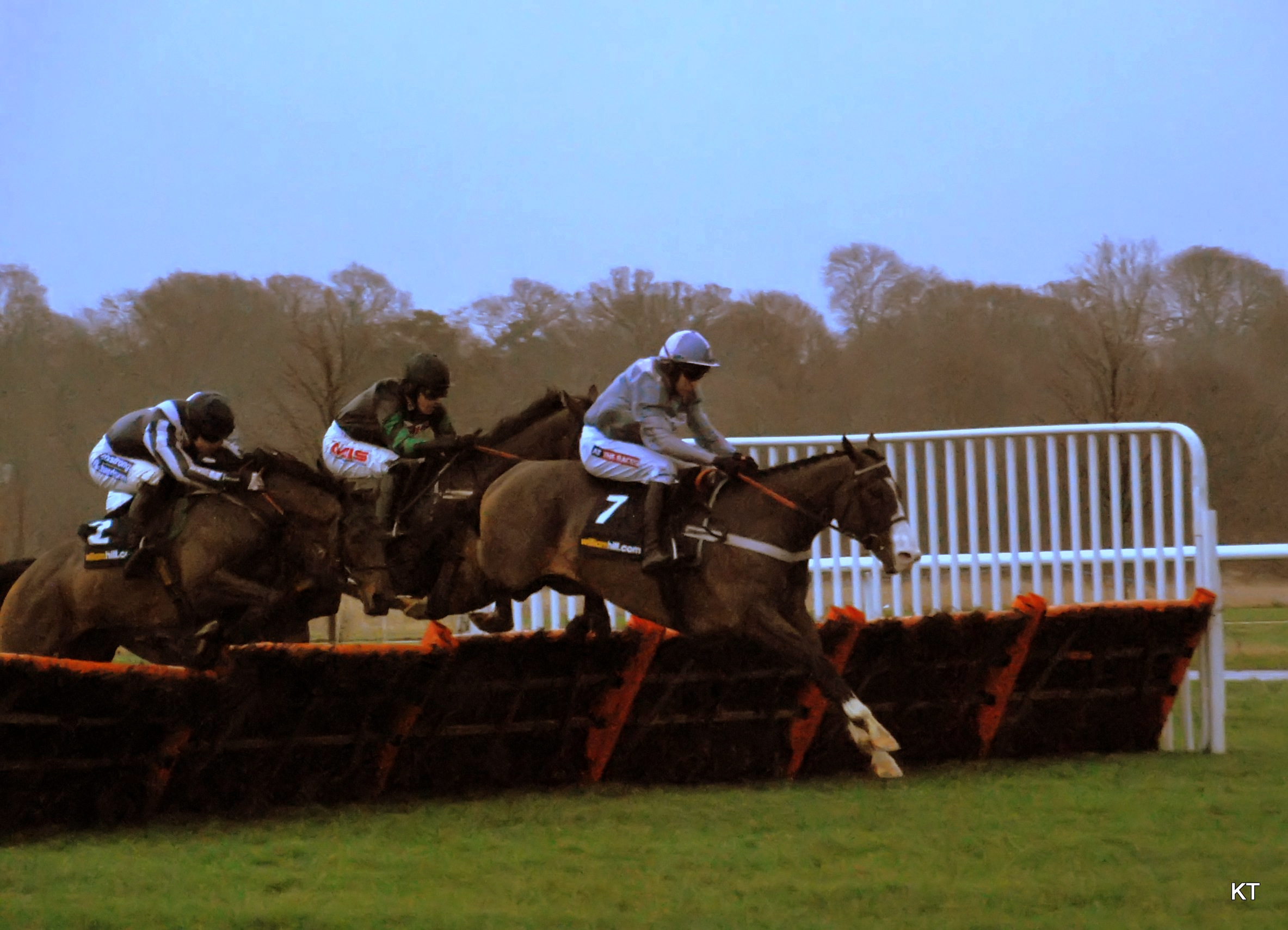
- Punjabi leads in the 2012 running
- Class: Grade 1
- Location: Kempton Park, Sunbury, England
- Race type: Hurdle race
- Sponsor: Ladbrokes
- Website: Kempton Park

Race information
- Distance: 2 miles (3,219 metres)
- Surface: Turf
- Track: Right-handed
- Qualification: Four-years-old and up
- Weight: 11 st 10 lb Allowances; 7 lb for fillies and mares
- Purse: £130,000 (2025); 1st: £74,035

Christmas Hurdle
2025
Sir Gino	Golden Ace	Rubaud

Previous years
2024
Constitution Hill	Lossiemouth	Burdett Road
2023
Constitution Hill	Rubaud	First Street
2022
Constitution Hill	Epatante	Highway One O Two
2021
Epatante	Glory And Fortune	Soaring Glory

2020-2011
2020
Silver Streak	Epatante	Ballyandy
2019
Epatante	Silver Streak	Ballyandy
2018
Verdana Blue	Buveur D'Air	If The Cap Fits
2017
Buveur D'air	The New One	Mohaayed
2016
Yanworth	The New One	Ch'tibello
2015
Faugheen	The New One	Hargam
2014
Faugheen	Purple Bay	Blue Heron
2013
My Tent Or Yours	The New One	Sametegal
2012
Darlan	Raya Star	Dodging Bullets
2011
Binocular	Rock on Ruby	Overturn

2010-2001
2010
Binocular	Overturn	Starluck
2009
Go Native	Starluck	Binocular
2008
Harchibald	Snap Tie	Blue Bajan
2007
Straw Bear	Harchibald	Penzance
2006
Jazz Messenger	Noble Request	Desert Quest
2005
Feathard Lady	Self Defense	Royal Shakespeare
2004
Harchibald	Rooster Booster	Perouse
2003
Intersky Falcon	Rooster Booster	Sporazene
2002
Intersky Falcon	Santenay	Davenport Milenium
2001
Landing Light	Bilboa	Hors La Loi III

2000-1991
2000
Geos	Ashley Park	Seebald
1999
Dato Star	Wahiba Sands	Sharpical
1998
French Holly	Master Beveled	Dato Star
1997
Kerawi	Shadow Leader	Sanmartino
1994
Absalom's Lady	Atours	Jazilah
1993
Muse	High Baron	Absalom's Lady
1992
Mighty Mogul	Flown	Granville Again
1991
Gran Alba	Royal Derbi	Ruling

1990-1987
1990
Fidway	Sybillin	Deep Sensation
1989
Kribensis	Osric	Floyd
1988
Kribensis	Floyd	Wishlon
1987
Osric	Aldino	Nohalmdun

The Christmas Hurdle is a Grade 1 National Hunt hurdle race in Great Britain which is open to horses aged four years or older. It is run at Kempton Park over a distance of about 2 miles (3,219 metres), and during its running there are eight hurdles to be jumped. The race is the second leg of the Triple Crown of Hurdling and is scheduled to take place each year during the King George VI Chase meeting on Boxing Day.

== History ==
During the 1960s Kempton staged a 2-mile handicap race on Boxing Day called the Kempton Park Handicap Hurdle. Its winners included Salmon Spray and Saucy Kit – both subsequent winners of the Champion Hurdle. The race was abandoned in 1967 and 1968, and it returned in the guise of the Christmas Hurdle in 1969.

Six winners of the race in its present format have gone on to victory in the Champion Hurdle. The first was Lanzarote, the winner of the latter event in 1974, and the others are Dawn Run (1983–84), Kribensis (1989–90), Faugheen (2014–15), Epatante (2019–20) and Constitution Hill (2022–23).

== Records ==
Most successful horse since 1969 (3 wins):

- Constitution Hill – 2022, 2023, 2024

Leading jockey since 1969 (6 wins):

- Nico de Boinville - Verdana Blue (2018), Epatante (2021), Constitution Hill (2022, 2023, 2024), Sir Gino (2025)

Leading trainer since 1969 (14 wins):

- Nicky Henderson – Geos (2000), Landing Light (2001), Binocular (2010, 2011), Darlan (2012), My Tent Or Yours (2013), Buveur d'Air (2017), Verdana Blue (2018), Epatante (2019, 2021), Constitution Hill (2022, 2023, 2024), Sir Gino (2025)

== Winners since 1969 ==
Year	Winner	Age	Jockey	Trainer
1969	Coral Diver	4	Terry Biddlecombe	Fred Rimell
1970	Abandoned due to snow
1971	Coral Diver	6	Terry Biddlecombe	Fred Rimell
1972	Canasta Lad	6	Jeff King	Peter Bailey
1973	Lanzarote	5	Richard Pitman	Fred Winter
1974	Tree Tangle	5	Andrew Turnell	Bob Turnell
1975	Lanzarote	7	John Francome	Fred Winter
1976	Dramatist	5	Bill Smith	Fulke Walwyn
1977	Beacon Light	6	Andrew Turnell	Bob Turnell
1978	Kybo	5	Bob Champion	Josh Gifford
1979	Birds Nest (Note: Celtic Ryde finished first in 1979 but he was relegated to second place after a stewards' enquiry)	9	Andrew Turnell	Bob Turnell
1980	Celtic Ryde	5	John Francome	Peter Cundell
1981	Abandoned due to frost
1982	Ekbalco	6	Jonjo O'Neill	Roger Fisher
1983	Dawn Run	5	Jonjo O'Neill	Paddy Mullins
1984	Browne's Gazette	6	Dermot Browne	Monica Dickinson
1985	Aonoch	6	Jimmy Duggan	Sally Oliver
1986	Nohalmdun	5	Peter Scudamore	Peter Easterby
1987	Osric	5	Graham McCourt	Mick Ryan
1988	Kribensis	4	Richard Dunwoody	Michael Stoute
1989	Kribensis	5	Richard Dunwoody	Michael Stoute
1990	Fidway	5	Steve Smith Eccles	Tim Thomson Jones
1991	Gran Alba	5	Graham McCourt	Richard Hannon Sr.
1992	Mighty Mogul	5	Richard Dunwoody	David Nicholson
1993	Muse	6	Mark Richards	David Elsworth
1994	Absalom's Lady	6	Paul Holley	David Elsworth
1995	Abandoned due to frost and snow
1996	Abandoned due to frost
1997	Kerawi	4	Carl Llewellyn	Nigel Twiston-Davies
1998	French Holly	7	Andrew Thornton	Ferdy Murphy
1999	Dato Star	8	Lorcan Wyer	Malcolm Jefferson
2000	Geos	5	Mick Fitzgerald	Nicky Henderson
2001	Landing Light	6	Mick Fitzgerald	Nicky Henderson
2002	Intersky Falcon	5	Charlie Swan	Jonjo O'Neill
2003	Intersky Falcon	6	Liam Cooper	Jonjo O'Neill
2004	Harchibald	5	Paul Carberry	Noel Meade
2005 (Note: The race was switched to Sandown Park in 2005 as Kempton was closed for redevelopment.)	Feathard Lady	5	Ruby Walsh	Colm Murphy
2006	Jazz Messenger	6	Niall Madden	Noel Meade
2007	Straw Bear	6	Tony McCoy	Nick Gifford
2008	Harchibald	9	Paul Carberry	Noel Meade
2009	Go Native	6	Davy Condon	Noel Meade
2010 (Note: The "2010" race was run on 15 January 2011, after Kempton Park's 2010 Boxing Day meeting was cancelled due to snow and frost)	Binocular	7	Tony McCoy	Nicky Henderson
2011	Binocular	7	Tony McCoy	Nicky Henderson
2012	Darlan	5	Tony McCoy	Nicky Henderson
2013	My Tent Or Yours	6	Tony McCoy	Nicky Henderson
2014	Faugheen	6	Ruby Walsh	Willie Mullins
2015	Faugheen	7	Ruby Walsh	Willie Mullins
2016	Yanworth	6	Barry Geraghty	Alan King
2017	Buveur d'Air	6	Barry Geraghty	Nicky Henderson
2018	Verdana Blue	6	Nico de Boinville	Nicky Henderson
2019	Epatante	5	Barry Geraghty	Nicky Henderson
2020	Silver Streak	7	Adam Wedge	Evan Williams
2021	Epatante	7	Nico de Boinville	Nicky Henderson
2022	Constitution Hill	5	Nico de Boinville	Nicky Henderson
2023	Constitution Hill	6	Nico de Boinville	Nicky Henderson
2024	Constitution Hill	7	Nico de Boinville	Nicky Henderson
2025	Sir Gino	5	Nico de Boinville	Nicky Henderson

== See also ==
- Horse racing in Great Britain
- List of British National Hunt races
