= Floyd (horse) =

British-bred Thoroughbred racehorse

- Racing silks of Michael Walsh
- Sire: Relko
- Grandsire: Tanerko
- Dam: Honey Palm
- Damsire: Honeyway
- Sex: Gelding
- Foaled: 1980
- Country: Great Britain
- Colour: Chestnut (coat)
- Breeder: Mrs Y. Gillespie
- Owner: Michael Walsh
- Trainer: David Elsworth
- Record: 39:19-4-3 (16 hurdle + 3 flat wins)
- Earnings: £196,234

Major wins
- Imperial Cup (1985); County Hurdle (1985); Bula Hurdle (1986); Fighting Fifth Hurdle (1987, 1988); Ring & Brymer Hurdle (1988); Kingwell Hurdle (1988, 1989); Long Walk Hurdle (1990); Rendlesham Hurdle (1991); Daily Telegraph Hurdle (1992)

Floyd (foaled 1980, died 7 January 1993) was an English bred and English trained National Hunt racehorse sired by Relko. The horse was named after the English progressive rock band Pink Floyd.

David Elsworth-trained Floyd was the first horse to win the Long Walk Hurdle when it was upgraded to Grade One status in 1990.

Only five horses have done the double of winning the Imperial Cup with a follow-up win at the same year’s Cheltenham Festival, with Floyd being the first in 1985 when he completed the double by winning the County Hurdle.

19 wins, £196,234: 3 wins at 3 and 5 years and £10,872; also 16 wins over hurdles
