= Binocular (horse) =

French-bred Thoroughbred racehorse

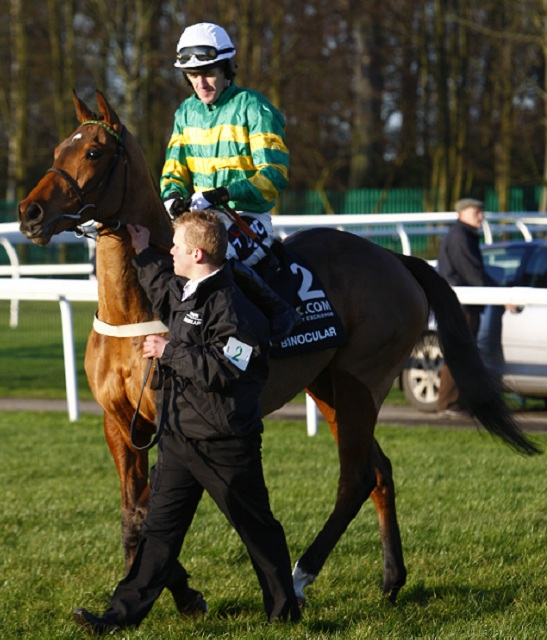
- Binocular and jockey Tony McCoy parading before the 2009 WBX Fighting Fifth Hurdle
- Sire: Enrique
- Grandsire: Barathea
- Dam: Bleu Ciel Et Blanc
- Damsire: Pistolet Bleu
- Sex: Gelding
- Foaled: 2004
- Country: France
- Colour: Bay
- Breeder: Élie Lellouche
- Owner: J. P. McManus
- Trainer: Nicky Henderson
- Record: 9-3-2 (18 starts)
- Earnings: £583,478

Major wins
- Anniversary 4-Y-O Novices' Hurdle (2008); Champion Hurdle (2010); Christmas Hurdle (2010 – run in 2011, 2011)
- Last updated on 29 December 2011

Binocular, foaled on 17 March 2004 in France, is a French thoroughbred retired racehorse. He was sired by Enrique out of the mare Bleu Ciel Et Blanc. He is owned by J. P. McManus and trained by Nicky Henderson. His primary jockey is Tony McCoy.

Binocular started racing as a two-year-old when he was entered into the Prix de Belleville – for unraced colt (horse) and geldings – in October 2006. In that race, he bested 10 other horses en route to his first victory. His first notable win came in February 2008 at Kempton Park Racecourse in Sunbury-on-Thames, Surrey, England where he won the Adonis Juvenile Novices' Hurdle, a Grade 2 National Hunt race. Although he won the race, McManus was disappointed. He said of Binocular; "It seemed that the horse didn't jump as well as he can, but Kempton is a quick track, and maybe he was not suited to it."

Binocular's first major win in a Grade 1 race came in April 2008. With jockey McCoy at the helm, he went on to win the 2008 Anniversary 4-Y-O Novices' Hurdle at Aintree Racecourse in Aintree, Merseyside, England where he beat Celestial Halo by 7 lengths. Binocular's other major Grade 1 National Hunt win came in the Champion Hurdle in March 2010 at Cheltenham Racecourse when he beat Khyber Kim by 3.5 lengths. Binocular had originally been ruled out of the Champion Hurdle due to a muscle problem, and he drifted out to as high as 999–1 to win the race. However, McManus and McCoy later decided he was fit to run. By winning the Champion Hurdle, he denied 4-1 race favourite Go Native the chance to become the first horse to win the Triple Crown of Hurdling.

Binocular's career record reads 9 wins, 3 seconds and 2 thirds, with 2 of his wins coming in Grade 1 races.

On 10 December 2013 it was announced that Binocular was retired due to a heart problem.
