= Fighting Fifth Hurdle =

Hurdle horse race in Britain

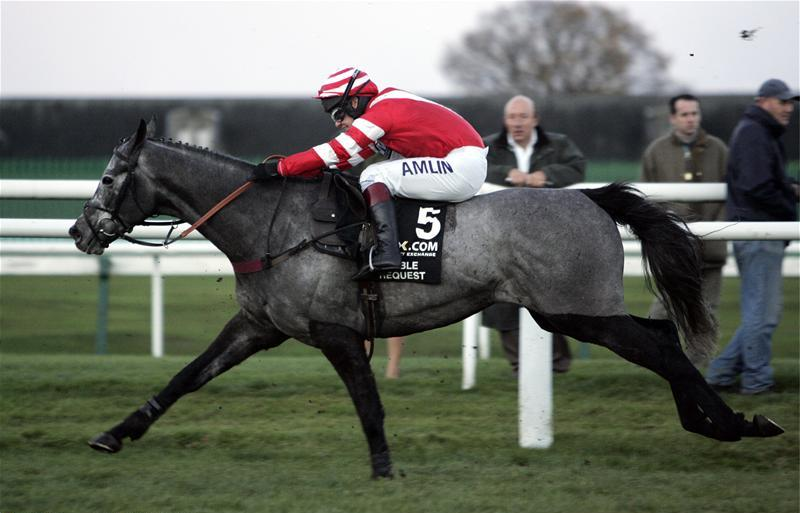
- Richard Johnson at the 2006 Fighting Fifth
- Class: Grade 1
- Location: Newcastle Racecourse; Newcastle, England
- Inaugurated: 1969
- Race type: Hurdle race
- Sponsor: BetMGM
- Website: Newcastle

Race information
- Distance: 2m 190y (3,392 metres)
- Surface: Turf
- Track: Left-handed
- Qualification: Four-years-old and up
- Weight: 11 st 10 lb Allowances; 7 lb for fillies and mares
- Purse: £115,000 (2025); 1st: £66,549

Fighting Fifth Hurdle
2025
Golden Ace	Anzadam	Nemean Lion

Previous years
2024
Sir Gino	Lump Sum	Kihavah
2023
Not So Sleepy	Love Envoi	You Wear It Well
2022
Constitution Hill	Epatante	Not So Sleepy
2021
Not So Sleepy	Epatante	Sceau Royal

2020-2011
2020
Epatante	Sceau Royal	Ribble Valley
2019
Cornerstone Lad	Buveur D'Air	Silver Streak
2018
Buveur D'Air	Samcro	Vision Des Flos
2017
Buveur D'air	Irving	Flying Tiger
2016
Irving	Apple's Jade	Hidden Cyclone
2015
Identity Thief	Top Notch	Wicklow Brave
2014
Irving	Aurore D'estruval	Arctic Fire
2013
My Tent Or Yours	Cockney Sparrow	Grumeti
2012
Countrywide Flame	Cinders And Ashes	Bothy
2011
Overturn	Binocular	Celestial Halo

2010-2001
2010
Peddlers Cross	Starluck	Binocular
2009
Go Native	Sublimity	Solwhit
2008
Punjabi	Sublimity	Blue Bajan
2007
Harchibald	Al Eile	Katchit
2006
Straw Bear	Noble Request	The French Furze
2005
Arcalis	Royal Shakespeare	The French Furze
2004
Harchibald	Inglis Drever	Royal Shakespeare
2003
The French Furze	Geos	Intersky Falcon
2002
Intersky Falcon	The French Furze	Marble Arch
2001
Landing Light	The French Furze	Simply Gifted

2000-1991
2000
Barton	The French Furze	Bring Sweets
1999
Dato Star	Shooting Light	Kilbue King
1998
Dato Star	French Holly	Midnight Legend
1997
Star Rage	Whip Hand	Native-Darrig
1996
Space Trucker	Castle Sweep	Dato Star
1995
Padre Mio	Chief Minister	Non Vintage
1994
Batabanoo	Surrey Dancer	Morceli
1992
Halkopous	Royal Derbi	Corrin Hill
1991
Royal Derbi	Nomadic Way	Sybillin

1990-1988
1990
Beech Road	Royal Derbi	Kharif
1989
Kribensis	Jinxy Jack	Past Glories
1988
Floyd	Celtic Chief	Sprowston Boy

The Fighting Fifth Hurdle is a Grade 1 National Hunt hurdle race in Great Britain which is open to horses aged four years or older. It is run at Newcastle over a distance of about 2 miles and 1 furlong (2 miles and 190 yards, or 3,392 metres), and during its running there are nine hurdles to be jumped. The race is the first leg of the Triple Crown of Hurdling scheduled to take place each year in late November or early December.

== History ==
The event was established in 1969, and the inaugural running was won by Mugatpura. Its title refers to the "Fighting Fifth", the nickname of the Royal Northumberland Fusiliers. In the year prior to the race's launch, the regiment (formerly known as the 5th Regiment of Foot) was amalgamated with three others to form the Royal Regiment of Fusiliers.

There were two triple winners of the Fighting Fifth Hurdle during the 1970s: Comedy of Errors and Bird's Nest. The latter also finished first in 1980 but after a stewards' inquiry he was relegated to second place behind Sea Pigeon.

The Fighting Fifth Hurdle was formerly classed at Grade 2 level, and for a brief spell in the 1990s it was run as a limited handicap. Its past sponsors have included Bellway Homes, Newcastle Building Society and Pertemps and the race has been sponsored by BetMGM since 2024. It was promoted to Grade 1 status in 2004, and it is now the first top-grade hurdle race of the British National Hunt season.

== Records ==
Most successful horse (3 wins):

- Comedy of Errors – 1972, 1973, 1974
- Birds Nest – 1976, 1977, 1979

Leading jockey (3 wins):

- Barry Geraghty - Punjabi (2008), Buveur d'Air (2017, 2018)

Leading trainer (9 wins):

- Nicky Henderson - Landing Light (2001), Punjabi (2008), My Tent Or Yours (2013), Buveur d'Air (2017, 2018), Epatante (2020, 2021 (2021 a dead heat)), Constitution Hill (2022), Sir Gino (2024)

== Winners ==
Year	Winner	Age	Jockey	Trainer
1969	Mugatpura	6	Willie Robinson	Fulke Walwyn
1970	Inishmaan	4	Terry Biddlecombe	Fred Rimell
1971	Dondieu	6	Brian Fletcher	Denys Smith
1972	Comedy of Errors	5	Bill Smith	Fred Rimell
1973	Comedy of Errors	6	Bill Smith	Fred Rimell
1974	Comedy of Errors	7	Ken White	Fred Rimell
1975	Night Nurse	4	Paddy Broderick	Peter Easterby
1976	Birds Nest	6	Steve Knight	Bob Turnell
1977	Birds Nest	7	Andrew Turnell	Bob Turnell
1978	Sea Pigeon	8	Ian Watkinson	Peter Easterby
1979	Birds Nest	9	Andrew Turnell	Bob Turnell
1980	Sea Pigeon (Note: Bird's Nest finished first in 1980, but he was relegated to second place after a stewards' inquiry)	10	Alan Brown	Peter Easterby
1981	Ekbalco	5	David Goulding	Roger Fisher
1982	Donegal Prince	6	Phil Tuck	Paul Kelleway
1983	Gaye Brief	6	Sam Morshead	Mercy Rimell
1984	Browne's Gazette	6	Dermot Browne	Monica Dickinson
1985	Out of the Gloom	4	Jonjo O'Neill	Reg Hollinshead
1986	Tom Sharp	6	Seamus O'Neill	Walter Wharton
1987	Floyd	7	Colin Brown	David Elsworth
1988	Floyd	8	Simon Sherwood	David Elsworth
1989	Kribensis	5	Mark Dwyer	Michael Stoute
1990	Beech Road	8	Richard Guest	Toby Balding
1991	Royal Derbi	6	Chris Grant	Neville Callaghan
1992	Halkopous	6	Steve Smith Eccles	Mark Tompkins
1993	Abandoned due to snow
1994	Batabanoo	5	Peter Niven	Mary Reveley
1995	Padre Mio	7	Richard Guest	Charlie Brooks
1996	Space Trucker	5	John Shortt	Jessica Harrington
1997	Star Rage	7	Dean Gallagher	Mark Johnston
1998	Dato Star	7	Lorcan Wyer	Malcolm Jefferson
1999	Dato Star	8	Lorcan Wyer	Malcolm Jefferson
2000	Barton	7	Tony Dobbin	Tim Easterby
2001	Landing Light	6	John Kavanagh	Nicky Henderson
2002	Intersky Falcon	5	Liam Cooper	Jonjo O'Neill
2003	The French Furze	9	Brian Harding	Nicky Richards
2004	Harchibald	5	Paul Carberry	Noel Meade
2005	Arcalis	5	Tony Dobbin	Howard Johnson
2006	Straw Bear	5	Tony McCoy	Nick Gifford
2007	Harchibald	8	Paul Carberry	Noel Meade
2008 (Note: The 2008 edition was held at Wetherby over 2 miles and 110 yards)	Punjabi	5	Barry Geraghty	Nicky Henderson
2009	Go Native	6	Davy Condon	Noel Meade
2010 (Note: The 2010 edition was held at Newbury over 2 miles and 110 yards)	Peddlers Cross	5	Jason Maguire	Donald McCain Jr.
2011	Overturn	7	Jason Maguire	Donald McCain Jr.
2012	Countrywide Flame	4	Denis O'Regan	John Quinn
2013	My Tent Or Yours	6	Tony McCoy	Nicky Henderson
2014	Irving	6	Nick Scholfield	Paul Nicholls
2015	Identity Thief	5	Bryan Cooper	Henry De Bromhead
2016	Irving	8	Harry Cobden	Paul Nicholls
2017	Buveur d'Air	6	Barry Geraghty	Nicky Henderson
2018	Buveur d'Air	7	Barry Geraghty	Nicky Henderson
2019	Cornerstone Lad	5	Henry Brooke	Micky Hammond
2020	Epatante	6	Aidan Coleman	Nicky Henderson
2021 (dh)	Epatante; Not So Sleepy	7; 9	Aidan Coleman; Jonathan Burke	Nicky Henderson; Hughie Morrison
2022	Constitution Hill	5	Nico de Boinville	Nicky Henderson
2023 (Note: The 2023 edition was held at Sandown Park over 2 miles)	Not So Sleepy	11	Sean Bowen	Hughie Morrison
2024	Sir Gino	4	Nico de Boinville	Nicky Henderson
2025	Golden Ace	7	Lorcan Williams	Jeremy Scott

== See also ==
- Horse racing in Great Britain
- List of British National Hunt races
