= Arcalis (horse) =

British-bred Thoroughbred racehorse

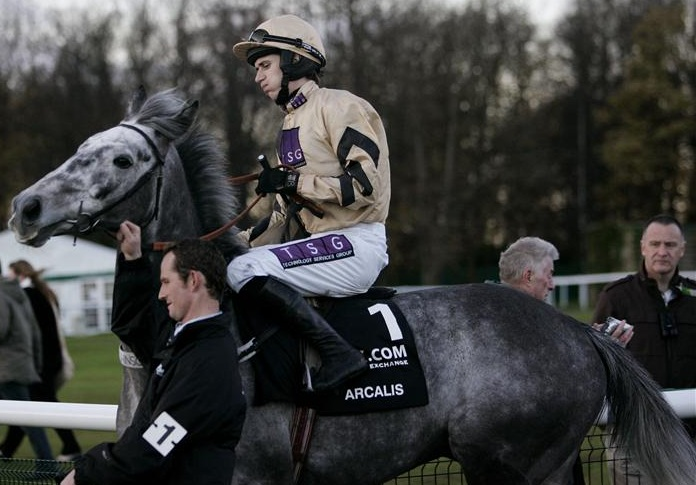
- Arcalis and jockey Paddy Brennan at the 2006 WBX Fighting Fifth Hurdle
- Sire: Lear Fan
- Grandsire: Roberto
- Dam: Aristocratique
- Damsire: Cadeaux Genereux
- Sex: Gelding
- Foaled: 2000
- Country: Great Britain
- Colour: Grey
- Breeder: PE Clinton
- Owner: Andrea Wylie, Graham Wylie
- Trainer: Howard Johnson
- Record: 47: 11-3-4
- Earnings: £345,849

Major wins
- John Smith's Cup (2004); Supreme Novices' Hurdle (2005); Fighting Fifth Hurdle (2005)

Arcalis (foaled on 7 March 2000 in Great Britain) is a British Thoroughbred racehorse, best known for his win in the Supreme Novices' Hurdle at the 2005 Cheltenham Festival.

== Background ==
Arcalis was sired by Lear Fan out of the mare Aristocratique, from whom he inherited his grey coat . He is owned by Andrea and Graham Wylie and is trained by Howard Johnson. Throughout his time as a racehorse, his predominant jockeys have been Denis O'Regan and Paddy Brennan. Arcalis was purchased in 2004 by Howard Johnson for owner Graham Wylie.

== Racing career ==
He started racing as a two-year-old in August 2002 when he was entered into the Cornmill Hotel Maiden Stakes, a Class D race. In that race, Arcalis finished fifth out of 11 entries. His first win came in October 2002 when he won the Annual Members Nursery, a Class E race in which he beat out 20 other entries for the victory.

His first win in a Grade 1 race came in March 2005 when he won the Supreme Novices' Hurdle at Cheltenham Racecourse, located on the outskirts of Cheltenham, Gloucestershire. He again bested a field of 20 horses, defeating Wild Passion by 10 lengths. After his big win, owner Graham Wylie said of his prized horse: He is a good horse and I never lost faith in him. The ground wasn't right last time and he wasn't right either. There were certain horses in the yard that weren't right, and he was amongst them.

Running in his first race since his win in the Supreme Novices' Hurdle, Arcalis went on to win the 2005 Fighting Fifth Hurdle at Newcastle Racecourse in Gosforth Park near Newcastle, England. He entered the race as a 9-4 favourite and went on to beat Royal Shakespeare by five lengths. Tony Dobbin, Acarlis’ jockey for the race said of his winning horse: He's a very high-class horse and traveled really well, quickened up and pricked his ears over the last. He's very good.

In April 2007 at Sandown Park Racecourse in Esher, Surrey, England, Arcalis won the Betfredcasino Hurdle in a deadheat against Penzance. However, the win was costly, as Arcalis was injured and it was serious enough to put him out for the entire 2007-2008 racing season. He did not race again until the 2008 Fighting Fifth Hurdle where he finished in last place. Arcalis has yet to win a race since suffering the injury.

As of May 2010, Arcalis has amassed a career record of 11 wins, 3 places and 2 shows while accumulating £345,849 in lifetime earnings in 43 career starts.
