= Golden Ace =

National hunt racehorse

- Sire: Golden Horn
- Grandsire: Cape Cross
- Dam: Deuce Again
- Damsire: Dubawi
- Sex: Mare
- Foaled: 25 March 2018
- Colour: Bay
- Breeder: Meon Valley Stud
- Owner: Ian Gosden
- Trainer: Jeremy Scott
- Record: 14: 8-3-1
- Earnings: £528,724

Major wins
- Ryanair Mares' Novices' Hurdle (2024); Kingwell Hurdle (2025); Champion Hurdle (2025); Fighting Fifth Hurdle (2025)
- Last updated on 29 November 2025

Colours of Mr I F Gosden, owner of Golden Ace

Golden Ace (foaled 25 March 2018) is a thoroughbred racehorse who competes in National Hunt racing. She gained her biggest victory when winning the 2025 Champion Hurdle, having previously won the Dawn Run Mares' Novices' Hurdle in 2024. She is owned by Ian Gosden and trained by Jeremy Scott.
