= Straw Bear =

American-bred racehorse

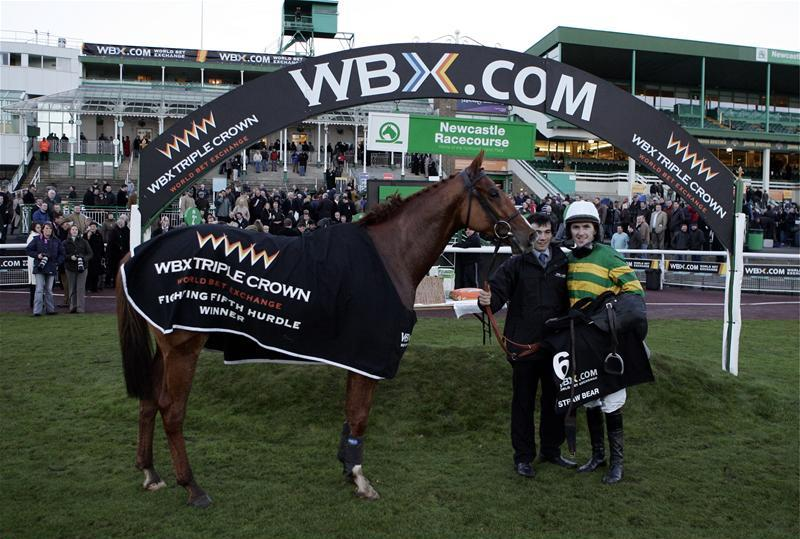
- Straw Bear after winning the 2006 Fighting Fifth Hurdle
- Sire: Diesis
- Grandsire: Sharpen Up
- Dam: Highland Ceilidh
- Damsire: Scottish Reel
- Sex: Gelding
- Foaled: 14 March 2001
- Country: United States
- Colour: Chestnut
- Breeder: Cyril Humphris
- Owner: J. P. McManus
- Trainer: Nick Gifford
- Record: 39:9-10-6
- Earnings: £327,558

Major wins
- Fighting Fifth Hurdle (2006); Christmas Hurdle (2007)

Straw Bear (foaled 2001) is an American-bred Thoroughbred racehorse. He was trained in England throughout his career and was notable for his performances in hurdle races. He won two Grade I events, the Fighting Fifth Hurdle and the Christmas Hurdle.

Straw Bear was bred in Kentucky. He was sired by Diesis out of the mare, Highland Ceilidh. He is owned by John P. McManus, trained by Nick Gifford, and his primary jockey has been Tony McCoy.

== Racing career ==
=== Flat racing ===
Straw Bear started racing as a two-year-old in June 2003. He won his first race, the Ladbrokes Novice Auction Stakes (a Class F race) in September 2006 at Wolverhampton Racecourse in Wolverhampton, West Midlands, England.

=== Hurdle racing ===
His first notable win came in April 2006 at Aintree Racecourse in Aintree, Liverpool, England where he won the John Smith's Imagine Appeal Top Novices' Hurdle, a Grade 2 National Hunt race. Straw Bear's first major win came in November 2006. With jockey Tony McCoy at the helm, he went on to win the 2006 Fighting Fifth Hurdle at Newcastle Racecourse in Newcastle, England where he beat Noble Request.

Straw Bear's other major Grade 1 National Hunt win came in the Christmas Hurdle in December 2007 at Kempton Park Racecourse in Surrey, England. Straw Bear narrowly beat out Harchibald for the victory. Afterward, McCoy spoke of the tough victory for Straw Bear: Harchibald is a very good horse and the plan was to have a little bit to battle with at the finish. We did have a bit left for a battle and mine's a good horse too and deserved to win a good race.

=== Steeplechasing ===
Straw Bear was raced over fences from 2008 but had little success. As of December 2011, he has failed to win in nine steeplechases.
