= Lanzarote (horse) =

British National Hunt horse (1968–1977)

Lanzarote (1968–1977) was a top-class National Hunt horse in both hurdling and steeplechasing. He won the Champion Hurdle in 1974. Lanzarote died after breaking a leg early in the 1977 Cheltenham Gold Cup, only the fourth time he had raced over fences. A powerful horse on the course but quiet off it, Lanzarote won 23 of 36 races and his Timeform rating of 177 places him in the top-10 hurdlers of all time.
