= WBX =

World Bet Exchange
- Type: Public
- Industry: Online gambling
- Founded: 2002
- Defunct: 2015
- Headquarters: Notting Hill Gate, London, United Kingdom
- Key people: Malcolm Gray (CEO)
- Products: Betting exchange, Mobile gambling
- Website: wbx.com

World Bet Exchange (WBX) was a person-to-person betting exchange based in Notting Hill Gate, London in the United Kingdom, and licensed and regulated by the UK Gambling Commission. WBX.com was founded in 2002 by Malcolm Gray but did not officially launch until 25 November 2006. Before the launch, Gray said the company intended to compete with the market leader Betfair, which he characterised as holding a near-monopoly on exchange betting. On 16 March 2015 the company announced that it was shutting, effective 5pm the same day.

== Company Structure ==
World Bet Exchange Limited and WBX Members Funds Limited were wholly owned subsidiaries of WBX Holdings Plc. All three companies were registered in England and Wales. WBX Members Funds Limited, which didn't otherwise trade, was a company that was established in order to safeguard members' funds in a separate bank account. The funds were held subject to a trust deed and quarterly, external audits, which were published on the WBX website. The company's structure was intended to prevent improper use of members' funds. Client-money protection had become a concern for exchanges after Sporting Options, an earlier British betting exchange, went into administration in 2004 owing money to its account holders.

== Racing Sponsorship ==
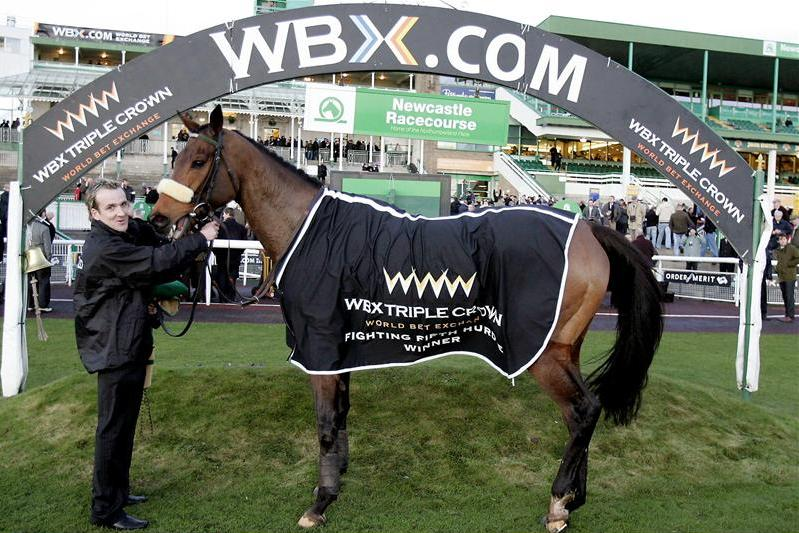
Fighting Fifth Hurdle, sponsored by WBX

Prior to the launch of WBX.com, the company was already the fourth largest sponsor of horse races in Britain, having spent more than £250,000 on over 200 race sponsorships. Coinciding with the November 2006 launch, WBX founded the Triple Crown of Hurdling to complement their sponsorship of the Newcastle Fighting Fifth Hurdle at Kempton Park Racecourse. The series linked three races, the Fighting Fifth Hurdle, the Christmas Hurdle and the Champion Hurdle, into a single championship for National Hunt hurdlers. If a horse won all three races in a single season, a £1 million bonus would be awarded and divided amongst the horse's connections.

== Industry Status ==
Like other rivals to Betfair, WBX attempted to secure new customers by charging less commission on winning bets. According to the findings of their own unpublished study, the company claimed that its members would have paid 35% more commission had they done their betting at Betfair. WBX also moved to capitalise on Betfair's September 2008 decision to impose a Premium Charge on winning bettors. WBX claimed that its members wagered over £500 million against one another in 2008, and in excess of £1 billion since its inception in 2006.
