= Kribensis (horse) =

Irish-bred Thoroughbred racehorse

- Sire: Henbit
- Grandsire: Hawaii
- Dam: Aquaria
- Damsire: Double-U-Jay
- Sex: Gelding
- Foaled: 1984
- Country: Ireland
- Colour: Grey
- Breeder: Martin Ryan
- Owner: Sheikh Mohammed
- Trainer: Sir Michael Stoute
- Record: 13-2-0
- Earnings: £185,795

Major wins
- Triumph Hurdle (1988); Gerry Feilden Hurdle (1988); Fighting Fifth Hurdle (1989); Christmas Hurdle (1988,1989); Champion Hurdle (1990)

Kribensis (foaled in 1984 in Ireland-died in 2007) was an Irish thoroughbred racehorse, born to sire, Henbit and dam, Aquaria. The horse was owned by Sheikh Mohammed and trained by Sir Michael Stoute. Kribensis gave Sheikh Mohammed his first Cheltenham Festival win when he won the Triumph Hurdle in 1988.

In 1989/90, with jockey Richard Dunwoody at the helm, Kribensis became the first horse to win the Fighting Fifth Hurdle, Christmas Hurdle and Champion Hurdle in the same season. This trio of races makes up the Triple Crown of Hurdling., In 2008/09, Punjabi came close to matching Kribensis’ feat, winning the Fighting Fifth and Champion Hurdle, but came up one hurdle short in the Christmas Hurdle.

Kribensis is one of three horses, along with Persian War and Katchit, to have won the Triumph Hurdle and Champion Hurdle in their racing careers., Kribensis is also just one of four grey horses to have won the Champion Hurdle, along with Victor Nornian (1936), Our Hope (1938) and Rooster Booster (2003).

In his career, Kribensis compiled 13 wins, 2 places and 0 shows in 23 career starts. Four of his 13 wins came in Grade 1 races, and overall, he accumulated £185,795 in career earnings. As he grew older, Kribensis’ colour changed slightly from grey to white, much like that of Desert Orchid. After Kribensis was retired in 1993, Sir Michael Stoute would often ride him as a hack. However, even as he grew older, Kribensis maintained his playful nature, and Stoute had to abandon using Kribensis as his hack, as he became prone to bucking and kicking.

On 13 October 2007 Kribensis was euthanised due to inoperable cancer at the age of 23. After his death, Sir Michael Stoute said of Kribensis: “We had [him] at Freemason Lodge for 22 years so you can imagine how much we will miss him."

== See also ==
- Sheikh Mohammed
- Sir Michael Stoute
- Triple Crown of Hurdling
