= Tony McCoy =

Northern Irish jockey (born 1974)

Sir Tony McCoy OBE
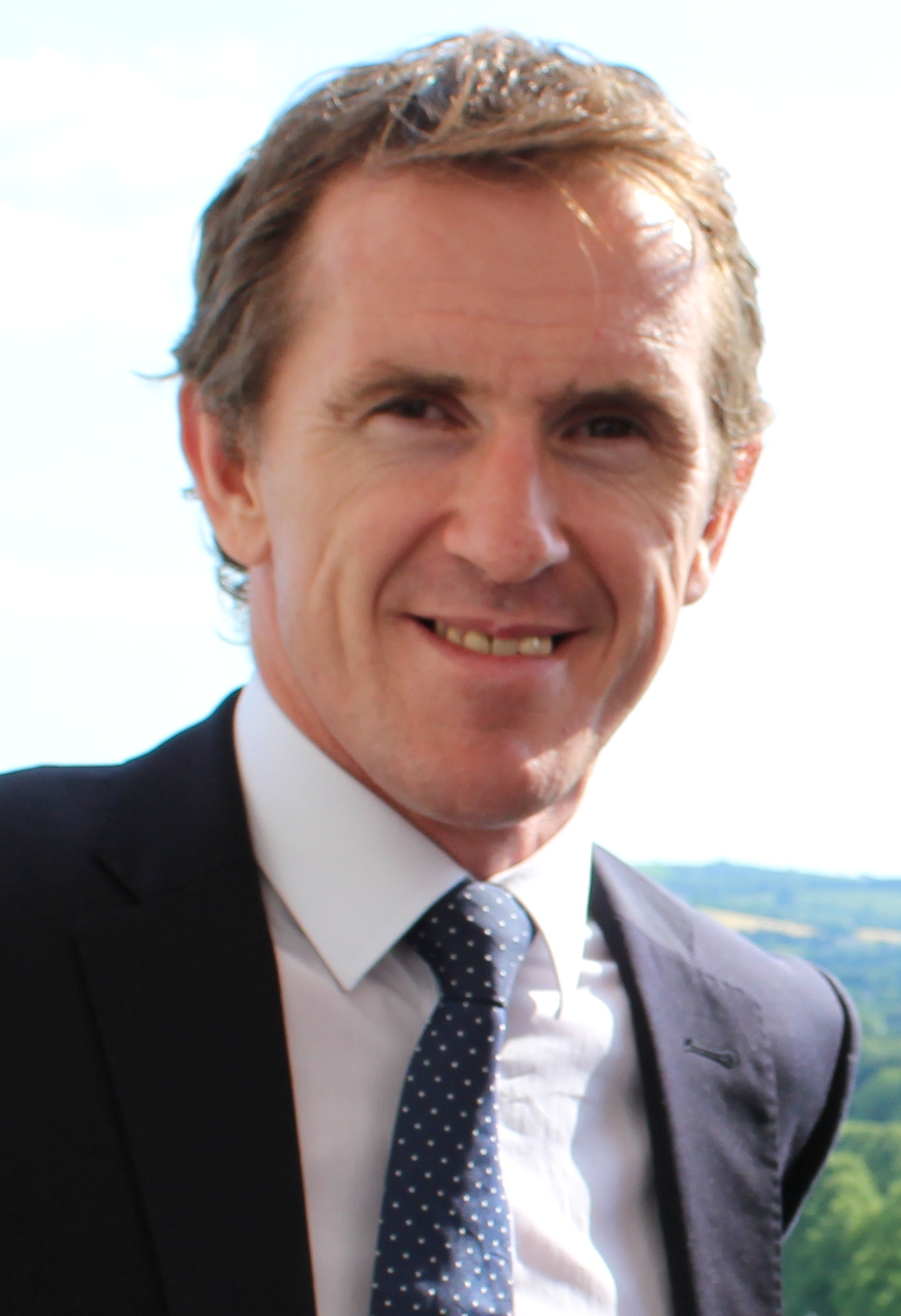
- McCoy in 2014

Personal information
- Full name: Sir Anthony Peter McCoy
- Born: 4 May 1974 (age 52) Moneyglass, County Antrim, Northern Ireland
- Occupation: Jockey (retired)
- Spouses: Chanelle, Lady McCoy
- Children: 2

Horse racing career
- Sport: Horse racing
- Career wins: 4,348 GB & IRE Jumps winners. 10 Flat race wins.

Major racing wins
- Grand National, Scottish Grand National, Cheltenham Gold Cup, Queen Mother Champion Chase, Champion Hurdle, King George VI Chase, Ryanair Chase, RSA Chase, Fighting Fifth Hurdle, Tingle Creek, Arkle Challenge Trophy, Welsh Grand National, Midlands Grand National, Irish Grand National, Lexus Chase, Galway Plate

Honours
- Knight Bachelor; Officer of the Most Excellent Order of the British Empire; BBC Sports Personality of the Year (2010); RTÉ Sports Person of the Year (2013); BBC Sports Personality of the Year Lifetime Achievement Award (2015)

Sir Anthony Peter McCoy (born 4 May 1974), commonly known as AP McCoy or Tony McCoy, is a Northern Irish former National Hunt jockey. Based in Ireland and Britain, McCoy rode a record 4,358 winners and was British jump racing Champion Jockey a record 20 consecutive times, every year that he was a professional.

McCoy recorded his first winner in 1992 at age 17. On 7 November 2013 he rode his 4,000th winner. In his first season riding in Britain, as an apprentice for trainer Toby Balding, McCoy won the Conditional Jump Jockeys Title with a record 74 winners. McCoy claimed his first Champion Jockey title in 1995/96 and retained until his retirement in 2015.

McCoy has won almost every major horse race on the British and Irish jumps circuit. His most high-profile winners include the Cheltenham Gold Cup, Champion Hurdle, Queen Mother Champion Chase, King George VI Chase and the 2010 Grand National.

He was named BBC Sports Personality of the Year in 2010, becoming the first jockey to win the award. In December 2013 he was named RTÉ Sports Person of the Year. He was knighted in January 2016.

== Career ==
McCoy on Refinement in 2006

McCoy rode his first winner of his career on the Jim Bolger trained Legal Steps, in a flat race at Thurles racecourse in Ireland, on 26 March 1992 at the age of 17. McCoy served as an apprentice at Jim Bolger's stable for the initial part of his career. Whilst riding work for Bolger one morning, McCoy suffered a fall and broke his leg on the gallops. By the time McCoy recovered from his leg break, he had continued to grow taller and as a result it was decided that the best option was to become a jump jockey. Success in Ireland soon led to a move across the Irish Sea, and he began riding in England in 1994. His first win in England came at Exeter on 7 September 1994 riding the Gordon Edwards trained Chickabiddy to a length victory. In his first season in England, McCoy served as a conditional jockey for successful trainer Toby Balding, which culminated in winning the Conditional Jump Jockeys Title in 1995. The following season he became champion jockey for the first time.

McCoy had burst on the scene as a result of his first season riding in Britain and soon attracted the attention of leading trainer Martin Pipe and, then, upcoming Paul Nicholls. McCoy joined forces with powerful trainer Martin Pipe in 1997 and between them they proved to be a strong partnership which dominated the sport.

By the end of the decade McCoy had set a new National Hunt record for winners in a season (253), equaled the record of five winners at the 1998 Cheltenham Festival, and became the fastest jockey to reach the 100 winner mark in a season in 2001. He went on to beat the long-standing record of Gordon Richards for the total number of winners ridden in a season, which stood since 1947. McCoy has said he counts this as his biggest achievement, despite his multiple Champion Jockey titles and big race victories.

He beat Richards' record of 269 winners in a season on Valfonic at Warwick on 2 April 2002. He achieved a new high of 289 winners, and on 27 August 2002, at Uttoxeter, his victory on Mighty Montefalco meant he had surpassed Richard Dunwoody's all time jumps record and was now the leading jumps jockey. He became the first jump jockey to ride 2,500 winners when getting Kanpai up to score at Huntingdon on 3 October 2006. McCoy rode his 3000th winner at Plumpton on the Nicky Henderson trained Restless D'Artaix in the Tyser & Co Beginners' Chase on 9 February 2009.

In spite of wins in the biggest races on the jumps racing calendar, including the Cheltenham Gold Cup, Champion Hurdle, Queen Mother Champion Chase, and King George VI Chase, it was the Grand National which had eluded McCoy. The nearest he had in the National were three third-place finishes, in 2001, 2002 aboard Martin Pipe's Blowing Wind, and in 2006 on Jonjo O'Neill's 5-1 joint favourite, Clan Royal, who in 2005 was still travelling well when they were hampered and taken out of the race by a loose horse at Becher's Brook on the second circuit. McCoy won the Grand National at the fifteenth attempt, on 10 April 2010 aboard Don't Push It, trained by Jonjo O'Neill and owned by J. P. McManus.

In 2012, McCoy won his second Cheltenham Gold Cup on Synchronised, trained by Jonjo O'Neill and owned by JP McManus, 15 years after his first Gold Cup win on Mr Mulligan. McCoy's winning ride on Synchronised typified his career as a jockey. Synchronised appeared outpaced during the first half of the extended 3 mile contest, however, Synchronised stayed on powerfully up the famous Cheltenham hill to pass both former winner Long Run and The Giant Bolster to land blue riband event at the Cheltenham Festival.

During the 2012 Grand National, McCoy's mount Synchronised fell at Becher's Brook, the sixth fence on the first circuit. The horse suffered soft-tissue damage, but did not appear to have sustained serious injury. However, Synchronised continued running riderless, until attempting to jump the 11th fence where he fell and incurred a fracture of the tibia and fibula in his right-hind leg, which resulted in him being put down.

McCoy made a delayed start to the 2013/2014 National Hunt season after breaking his ribs from a heavy fall on the Nicky Henderson trained Quantitativeeasing in a handicap hurdle at Cheltenham's end of season April meeting. McCoy, who spent seven nights in hospital, returned to action a month later at Ludlow and immediately opened his account for the season on the JP McManus owned horse Church Field. He surpassed the 100 winner mark for the 2013/2014 season after riding a remarkable 5-timer at Carlisle racecourse in October, closely followed by 5 winners over the two-day Aintree October meeting.

McCoy sealed his 4000th career win riding the Jonjo O'Neill trained Mountain Tunes, in the colours of owner JP McManus, to a hard-fought victory in the Weatherbys Novices' Hurdle at Towcester on 7 November 2013. His mount, Mountain Tunes, looked to have little chance with two hurdles to jump yet McCoy managed to get up in the final strides to beat Kris Spin ridden by Jamie Moore.

On 30 November 2013, Tony McCoy had the choice to ride at Newbury, or Newcastle. McCoy rode My Tent Or Yours to victory in the Grade One Fighting Fifth Hurdle at Newcastle, which eventually turned out to be a good decision as on the same day, At Fishers Cross flopped in the Long Walk Hurdle at Newbury. McCoy reached the 150 winners landmark for the 2013/2014 season after riding a double at Ffos Las racecourse on 16 December 2013. This was the 18th time, out of the 20 seasons riding in Britain, he has surpassed 150 winners for a season. At the end of the 2013/14 season, McCoy was crowned Champion jockey for the 19th consecutive time, further extending his record of title wins.

On 10 June 2014, McCoy recorded his fastest ever half century of winners for a season after riding the Rebecca Curtis trained Bob Keown to victory at Worcester Racecourse. McCoy achieved the 50 winner mark for the 2014/15 National Hunt season, which started on 27 April 2014, in just 44 days.

On 19 July 2014, McCoy reached a significant personal milestone by surpassing the total of 4,191 winners which friend and mentor Martin Pipe achieved as a licensed trainer before retirement in 2006. McCoy recorded winner number 4,192 by guiding the Jonjo O'Neill trained It's A Gimme to victory in the Betfred Summer Plate Listed Handicap Chase at Market Rasen Racecourse. McCoy enjoyed a long period of success as stable jockey to the 15 time Champion Trainer Martin Pipe.

McCoy broke his own record for the fastest ever century of winners for a National Hunt season, recording his 100th winner of the 2014/15 campaign on board the John Ferguson trained Arabic History at Newton Abbot Racecourse on 21 August 2014, 116 days into the season. McCoy's previous record, set during the 2001/2002 season, stood at 100 winners by 4 September, approximately 130 days into the season.

McCoy announced live on Channel 4 after his win on Mr Mole in the Game Spirit Chase that he would retire at the end of the 2014/15 NH Season. It was his 200th win of the season, the ninth occasion on which he had reached that landmark, and he later clarified that it would be his last such achievement. His last ride as a professional was at the Bet365 Gold Cup meeting at Sandown in April 2015.

== Trainer relationships and colours ==
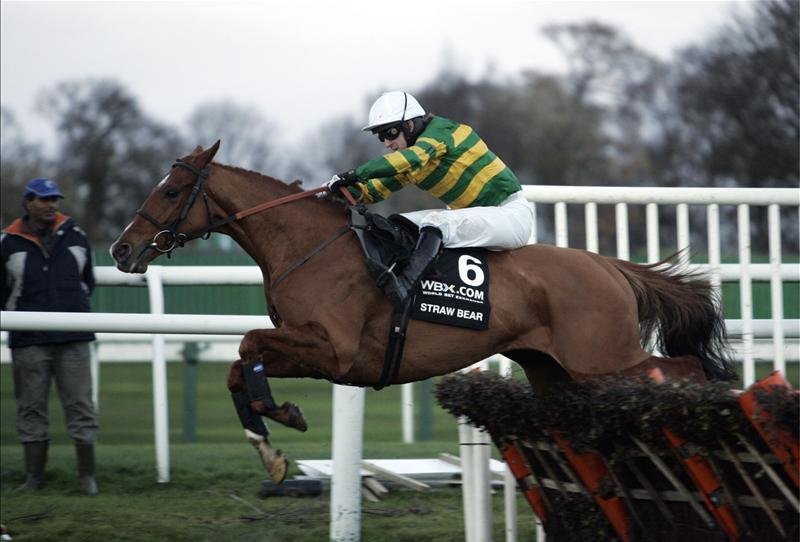
Tony McCoy on Straw Bear, winner of the 2006 Fighting Fifth Hurdle

McCoy was retained by Irish racehorse owner, J. P. McManus and therefore rode all of his horses in Britain and occasionally Ireland. McCoy joined forces with McManus in 2004 after reportedly being offered a £1 million a year retainer. McCoy had previously spent seven years as Martin Pipe's first jockey and many within racing were surprised of his decision to split from the successful Pipe stable. He has won a further 10 jockey titles since their separation.

McManus has the majority of his horses in training with ex-jockey Jonjo O'Neill who trains at the state-of-the-art training facility "Jackdaws Castle" in Gloucestershire, which is owned by McManus. McCoy often rode horses trained by Jonjo O'Neill in addition to those owned by McManus. When he was not required to ride for McManus or O'Neill, McCoy had struck up a number of links with leading national hunt trainers. He rode a number of horses for Welsh-based trainer Rebecca Curtis. He also linked up with powerful trainer Nicky Henderson when his first jockey Barry Geraghty was riding in Ireland. McCoy was most commonly associated with the green and gold hooped silks of McManus.

== Sports Personality of the Year ==
McCoy was named 2010 BBC Sports Personality of the Year and in doing so became the first jockey to win the award, polling ahead of darts player Phil Taylor and Olympic heptathlete Jessica Ennis, who finished second and third place respectively. McCoy's win in the 2010 Grand National at his 15th attempt on board the Jonjo O'Neill trained Don't Push It was seen to be the main contributing factor to his win.

McCoy was made the bookmakers' favourite for the award after his Grand National victory, however there were concerns that those beyond the horse racing fraternity may not fully understand his incredible achievements in racing and subsequently decide to vote for other contenders from "mainstream" sports. He received 293,152 votes, which was more than former winners Joe Calzaghe (2007), Sir Chris Hoy (2008) or Ryan Giggs (2009).

He made the final shortlist of ten for BBC Sports Personality of the Year 2013 after surpassing the landmark total of 4000 career winners over jumps during the course of the 2013/2014 National Hunt racing season. McCoy finished in third place behind the winner Andy Murray and runner up Leigh Halfpenny. He was named 2013 RTÉ Irish Sports Personality of the Year on 21 December 2013.

== Personal life ==
McCoy was born in Moneyglass, County Antrim. He and his wife Chanelle have two children. At 1.78 m (5 ft 10 in), he is tall for a jockey and had to waste to achieve racing weights of 63.5 kg (10 stone) when his natural weight was about 75 kg (one and a half stone more).

McCoy has released five volumes of his autobiography; Real McCoy: My Life So Far (1999), McCoy (2003), A.P. McCoy: My Autobiography (2011) and Winner: My Racing Life (2015). His debut novel, Taking the Fall, was published in 2013. His final season was the subject of a film, Being AP, which was launched in November 2015.

McCoy is an Arsenal fan. As a friend of former Arsenal player Ray Parlour, he played a part in the naming of a racehorse The Romford Pele, in reference to Parlour's nickname during his playing days. He also has friendships with other footballers, including former Liverpool duo Steve McManaman and Robbie Fowler, who engaged him and Martin Pipe for Cheltenham.

In October 2013, McCoy joined BBC Radio 5 Live as a racing pundit every Friday evening on the "5 Live Sport" programme hosted by Dan Walker. In November 2015, following his retirement as a jockey, he joined Channel 4 Racing as a pundit.

In 2017, his wife, Chanelle McCoy was unveiled as the new dragon in RTE's Dragons' Den, replacing former dragon Eamonn Quinn."

== Honours ==
Champion Jockey: 1995/96, 1996/97, 1997/98, 1998/99, 1999/2000, 2000/01, 2001/02, 2002/03, 2003/04, 2004/05, 2005/06, 2006/07, 2007/08, 2008/09, 2009/10, 2010/11, 2011/12, 2012/2013, 2013/2014, 2014/2015

Champion Conditional Jockey: 1994/95

Lester Awards: McCoy has been honoured with 20 Lester Awards during his riding career to date, the most of any jockey past or present.

- Conditional Jockey of the Year: 1995
- Jump Jockey of the Year: 1996, 1997, 1998, 1999, 2000, 2001, 2002, 2003, 2004, 2006, 2007, 2008, 2009, 2010, 2011, 2012
- Jockey of the Year: 1997 (award discontinued after 1997)
- Jump Ride of the Year: 2009 (for the winning ride on Wichita Lineman in the William Hill Trophy at the Cheltenham Festival on 10 March 2009), 2012 (for the winning ride on Synchronised in the Cheltenham Gold Cup at the Cheltenham Festival on 16 March 2012)

McCoy was appointed Member of the Order of the British Empire (MBE) in the 2003 Birthday Honours and Officer of the Order of the British Empire (OBE) in the 2010 Birthday Honours for his services to horse racing.

In December 2010, McCoy was named Sportsman of the Year at the British Sports Awards in London, voted for by the Sports Journalists' Association.

In 2010, McCoy won the 'Jump off the Sofa Moment' Award at the Jaguar Academy of Sport Annual Awards ceremony for his Grand National win.

In December 2013, McCoy was officially awarded three Guinness World Records. He was presented with certificates to mark his record of 289 jump wins in the 2001/2002 season, the most Champion Jump Jockey titles (18) and the most career jump winners, 4022 as of 4 December 2013.

== Knighthood ==
McCoy was knighted in the 2016 New Year Honours for services to horse racing.

== Major Wins ==
Cheltenham Festival (31)

- Albert Bartlett Novices' Hurdle (3): Black Jack Ketchum (2006), Wichita Lineman (2007), At Fishers Cross (2013)
- Arkle Challenge Trophy (3): Or Royal (1997), Champleve (1998), Well Chief (2004)
- Byrne Group Plate (1): Majadou (1999)
- Cathcart Challenge Cup (2): Cyfor Malta (1998), Royal Auclair (2002)
- Champion Bumper (1): Liberman (2003)
- Champion Hurdle (3): Make A Stand (1997), Brave Inca (2006), Binocular (2010)
- Cheltenham Gold Cup (2): Mr Mulligan (1997), Synchronised (2012)
- County Hurdle (2): Blowing Wind (1998), Alderwood (2012)
- Festival Trophy Handicap Chase (1): Wichita Lineman (2009)
- JLT Novices' Chase (2): Noble Prince (2011), Taquin Du Seuil (2014)
- Jewson Novices' Handicap Chase (1): Reveillez (2006)
- Johnny Henderson Grand Annual Chase (3): Kibreet (1996), Edredon Bleu (1998), Alderwood (2013)
- Pertemps Final (1): Unsinkable Boxer (1998)
- Queen Mother Champion Chase (1): Edredon Bleu (2000)
- RSA Chase (1): Albertas Run (2008)
- Ryanair Chase (3): Albertas Run (2010, 2011), Uxizandre (2015)
- Supreme Novices' Hurdle (1): Hors La Loi III (1999)

Major Nationals

- Grand National (1): Don't Push It (2010)
- Irish Grand National (1): Butler's Cabin (2007)
- Midlands Grand National (1): Synchronised (2010)
- Scottish Grand National (1): Belmont King (1997)
- Welsh National (1): Synchronised (2010)

Other Notable Races (United Kingdom) Great Britain

- Aintree Hurdle (2): Pridwell (1998), Jezki (2015)
- Anniversary 4-Y-O Novices' Hurdle (3): Zabadi (1996), Hors La Loi III (1999), Binocular (2008)
- Ascot Chase (2): Tresor de Mai (2002), Tiutchev (2003)
- Bet365 Gold Cup (2): Bounce Back (2002), Hennessy (2009)
- Betfred Bowl (2): Tiutchev (2004), Exotic Dancer (2007)
- Celebration Chase (3): Edredon Bleu (2001), Seebald (2003), French Opera (2011)
- Challow Novices' Hurdle (6): Classified (2001), Coolnagorna (2002), Wichita Lineman (2006), Backspin (2010), Taquin Du Seuil (2012), Captain Cutter (2013)
- Champion Four Year Old Hurdle (1): Shaunies Lady (1996)
- Christmas Hurdle (5): Straw Bear (2006), Binocular (2010, 2011), Darlan (2012), My Tent Or Yours (2013)
- Feltham Novices' Chase (3): Gloria Victis (1999), Maximize (2001), Darkness (2005)
- Fighting Fifth Hurdle (2): Straw Bear (2006), My Tent Or Yours (2013)
- Finale Juvenile Hurdle (2): Rainwatch (1997), Phar Bleu (2004)
- Henry VIII Novices' Chase (3): Direct Route (1997), Dines (1998), Somersby (2009)
- International Hurdle (2): Valiramix (2001), Binocular (2008)
- King George VI Chase (1): Best Mate (2002)
- Lexus Chase (2): Exotic Dancer (2008), Synchronised (2011)
- Liverpool Hurdle (2): Galant Moss (1999), Deano's Beeno (2003)
- Long Walk Hurdle (3): Deano's Beeno (2002), Big Buck's (2010, 2011)
- Maghull Novices' Chase (2): Well Chief (2004), Foreman (2006)
- Manifesto Novices' Chase (1): Uxizandre (2014)
- Melling Chase (3): Viking Flagship (1996), Albertas Run (2010), Don Cossack (2015)
- Mersey Novices' Hurdle (2): Classified (2002), Lac Fontana (2014)
- Mildmay Novices' Chase (3): Boss Doyle (1998), Like-a-Butterfly (2005), Holywell (2014)
- Paddy Power Gold Cup (4): Cyfor Malta (1998), Lady Cricket (2000), Shooting Light (2001), Exotic Dancer (2007)
- Scilly Isles Novices' Chase (3): Upgrade (2000), Tarxien (2003), Napolitain (2006)
- Sefton Novices' Hurdle (3): Unsinkable Boxer (1998), Black Jack Ketchum (2006), At Fishers Cross (2013)
- Tingle Creek Chase (1): Master Minded (2008)
- Tolworth Hurdle (2): Iznogoud (2001), Royal Boy (2014)
- Victor Chandler Chase (2): Nordance Prince (2000), Master Minded (2011)

(Republic of Ireland) Ireland

- December Festival Hurdle (1): Brave Inca (2005)
- Evening Herald Champion Novice Hurdle (4): His Song (1998), Jered (2008), Shot From The Hip (2011), Alderwood (2012)
- Fort Leney Novice Chase (2): Boss Doyle (1997), Carlingford Lough (2013)
- Galway Hurdle (2): Toast the Spreece (1997), Thomas Edison (2014)
- Galway Plate (2): Finger On the Pulse (2010), Carlingford Lough (2013)
- Golden Cygnet Novice Hurdle (2): Monifeth Man (2000), Washington Lad (2005)
- Growise Champion Novice Chase (2): Kempes (2010), Carlingford Lough (2014)
- Hatton's Grace Hurdle (2): Brave Inca (2006), Jezki (2013)
- Hennessy Gold Cup (Ireland) (1): Carlingford Lough (2015)
- Irish Champion Hurdle (1): Brave Inca (2006)
- Morgiana Hurdle (1): Brave Inca (2005)
- Powers Gold Cup (3): Like-a-Butterfly (2005), Justified (2006), Gilgamboa (2015)
- Punchestown Champion Hurdle (2): Brave Inca (2005), Jezki (2014)
- Ryanair Novice Chase (1): Captain Cee Bee (2010)
- World Series Hurdle (2): Derrymoyle (1998), Refinement (2007)
- Champion Four Year Old Hurdle (1) : Shaunies Lady (1996)

=== Winning Milestones ===
- 1,000th winner: Majadou, Cheltenham, 11 December 1999
- 1,500th winner: Celtic Native, Exeter, 20 December 2001
- 2,000th winner: Magical Bailiwick, Wincanton, 17 January 2004
- 2,500th winner: Kanpai, Huntingdon, 3 October 2006
- 3,000th winner: Restless D'Artaix, Plumpton, 9 February 2009
- 4,000th winner: Mountain Tunes, Towcester, 7 November 2013

=== Total National Hunt Winners in Britain by Season ===
- 1994/95 74
- 1995/96 175
- 1996/97 190
- 1997/98 253
- 1998/99 186
- 1999/00 245
- 2000/01 191
- 2001/02 289 †
- 2002/03 258
- 2003/04 209
- 2004/05 200
- 2005/06 178
- 2006/07 184
- 2007/08 140
- 2008/09 186
- 2009/10 195
- 2010/11 218
- 2011/12 199
- 2012/13 185
- 2013/14 218
- 2014/15 231

† A British Horse Racing record for most winners ridden in a season by a jockey (flat or jumps), beating Sir Gordon Richards' long-standing record of 269 winners set in 1947

=== Total National Hunt winners in Ireland by Season (144) ===
- 1993-94 3
- 1994-95 4
- 1995-96 7
- 1996-97 2
- 1997-98 8
- 1998-99 4
- 1999-00 7
- 2000-01 0
- 2001-02 1
- 2002-03 0
- 2003-04 0
- 2004-05 13
- 2005-06 22
- 2006-07 7
- 2007-08 8
- 2008-09 5
- 2009-10 6
- 2010-11 6
- 2011-12 12
- 2012-13 8
- 2013-14 11
- 2014-15 10

== See also ==
- List of jockeys
