= Nicky Henderson =

British racehorse trainer (born 1950)

Nicky Henderson LVO OBE
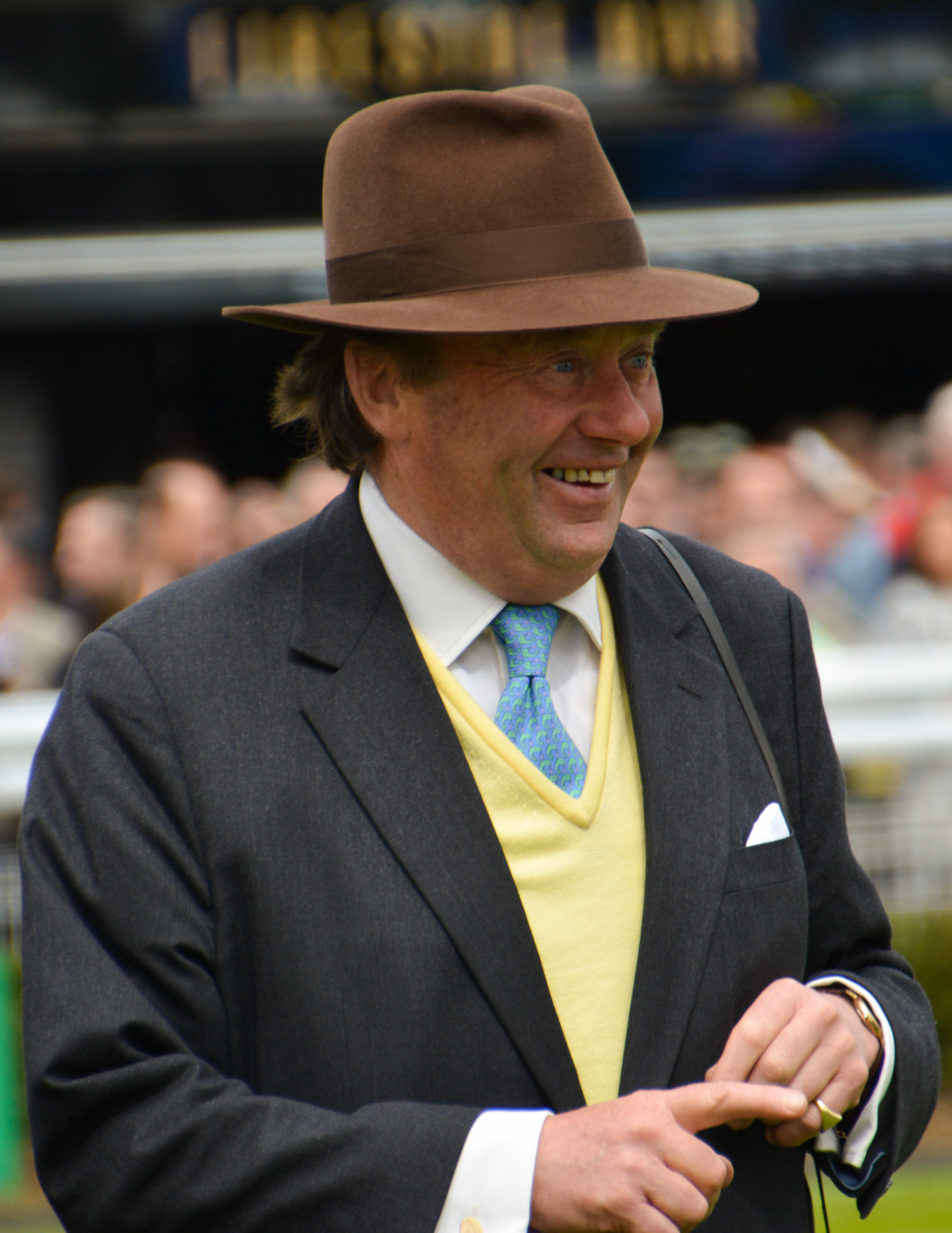
- Henderson in 2015
- Born: Nicholas John Henderson; 10 December 1950 (age 75)
- Education: Eton College
- Occupation: Racehorse trainer
- Relatives: Johnny Henderson (father)

Nicholas John Henderson LVO OBE (born 10 December 1950) is a British racehorse trainer. He has been British jump racing Champion Trainer six times.

== Background ==
His father was Johnny Henderson who was one of the founders of the Racecourse Holdings Trust as well as earlier in life being Aide-de-camp to Field Marshal Montgomery. In 2005 two years after Johnny Henderson's death Cheltenham renamed one of the races at the Cheltenham Festival in his honour as the Johnny Henderson Grand Annual Chase. In 2006 Nicky Henderson won this race with a horse called Greenhope.

Henderson, educated at Eton College, he started in horse racing as an amateur jockey, progressed to assistant trainer to Fred Winter between 1974 and 1978, and has been a trainer since 1978, based at Seven Barrows, in the civil parish of Lambourn, Berkshire.

== Achievements ==
His most notable successes have come with See You Then, winner of the Champion Hurdle in 1985, 1986 and 1987; Remittance Man, winner of the Queen Mother Champion Chase in 1992; Punjabi, winner of the Smurfit Kappa Champion Hurdle in 2009 at the Cheltenham Festival, Binocular, winner of the 2010 Champion Hurdle, Long Run, winner of the 2011 Cheltenham Gold Cup and Bobs Worth, winner of the 2013 Cheltenham Gold Cup. Binocular's Champion Hurdle gave Henderson a fifth win in the race, equalling the record held by Peter Easterby. Zaynar, another horse he trained, also won at the 2009 Cheltenham Festival in the Triumph Hurdle. He was Champion Trainer in the 1985/86 and 1986/87 seasons. His record at the Cheltenham Festival is particularly good and amongst currently active trainers only Willie Mullins has won more races at the Festival than Henderson. His main stable jockey was Mick Fitzgerald until Fitzgerald was forced to retire by an injury sustained in the 2008 Grand National; from the 2008–09 season until the 2014–15 season Barry Geraghty was Henderson's principal jockey in Britain. At the start of the 2015–16 season Nico de Boinville became Henderson's principal jockey after Geraghty replaced Tony McCoy as the principal jockey of J P McManus.

One of Henderson's most popular horses in recent years, Caracciola, won the Cesarewitch Handicap flat race at Newmarket in 2008 at odds of 50/1 as an 11-year-old, despite mainly being a National Hunt horse. Caracciola followed up this success by winning the Queen Alexandra Stakes at Royal Ascot in 2009 as a 12-year-old with Eddie Ahern riding on both occasions. Henderson claimed his second winner at the famous Royal Ascot meeting when Veiled won the 2011 Ascot Stakes at 11/2. In 2013 Henderson had another important win with his horse Bobs Worth (bought for only £20,000) continuing his unbeaten streak at Cheltenham with a win in the Gold Cup. This was despite Henderson raising concerns about the suitability of the soft ground before the race started.

Henderson was appointed Officer of the Order of the British Empire (OBE) in the 2020 New Year Honours for services to horse racing.

== Controversy ==
In June 2009, Henderson was found guilty by a British Horseracing Authority panel of breaching the rules of racing, after Moonlit Path, a mare he trained for the Queen, failed a drugs test. Henderson admitted to three of the four charges he faced in relation to the case, in which a prohibited anti-bleeding drug was found in the horse's bloodstream. Henderson accepted that the drug should not have been administered, but argued that it had been done for the horse's welfare, and that he had not been attempting to enhance performance.

A further hearing was held in July 2009 to determine the sanction to be applied, and Henderson was fined £40,000 (a record penalty for the sport in the UK) and banned from running horses for three months (11 July to 10 October 2009). However, as Henderson is primarily a jumps trainer and this ban was during the flat season it caused him little inconvenience. He was allowed to continue training during the "ban" (which could more accurately be described as a suspension rather than a ban) but was not allowed to enter horses for the period of his ban. The majority of his flat horses were sent to his friend and fellow Lambourn trainer Barry Hills, highest profile of these horses being Caracciola. He caused a little controversy when he attended Royal Ascot when the horse ran but was not breaking any rules as he had not been "warned off" and he was a guest of Barry Hills.

== Cheltenham Festival winners (78) ==
- Cheltenham Gold Cup - (2) Long Run (2011), Bobs Worth (2013)
- Champion Hurdle - (9) See You Then (1985, 1986, 1987), Punjabi (2009), Binocular (2010), Buveur d'Air (2017, 2018), Epatante (2020), Constitution Hill (2023)
- Queen Mother Champion Chase - (6) Remittance Man (1992), Finian's Rainbow (2012), Sprinter Sacre (2013, 2016), Altior (2018, 2019)
- Stayers' Hurdle - (2) Rustle (1989), Bacchanal (2000)
- Supreme Novices' Hurdle - (6) River Ceiriog (1986), Flown (1992), Altior (2016), Shishkin (2020), Constitution Hill (2022), Old Park Star (2026)
- Baring Bingham Novices' Hurdle - (1) Simonsig (2012)
- Triumph Hurdle - (7) First Bout (1985), Alone Success (1987), Katarino (1999), Zaynar (2009), Soldatino (2010), Peace And Co (2015), Pentland Hills (2019)
- Arkle Challenge Trophy - (8) Remittance Man (1991), Travado (1993), Tiutchev (2000), Sprinter Sacre (2012), Simonsig (2013), Altior (2017), Shishkin (2021), Jango Baie (2025)
- David Nicholson Mares' Hurdle - (1) Marie's Rock
- Spa Novices' Hurdle - (1) Bobs Worth (2011)
- RSA Insurance Novices' Chase - (4) Trabolgan (2005), Bobs Worth (2012), Might Bite (2017), Champ (2020)
- Ryanair Chase - (2) Fondmort (2006), Riverside Theatre (2012)
- Festival Trophy Handicap Chase - (2) Marlborough (2000), Beware The Bear (2019)
- Centenary Novices' Handicap Chase - (1) Rajdhani Express (2013)
- Coral Cup - (5) Spirit River (2010), Whisper (2014), William Henry (2019), Dame De Compagnie (2020), Jingko Blue (2026)
- County Handicap Hurdle - (2) Thumbs Up (1993), Barna Boy (1997)
- Fred Winter Juvenile Novices' Handicap Hurdle - (1) Une Artiste (2012)
- Paddy Power Plate Handicap Chase - (4) The Tsarevich (1985, 1986), Liberthine (2005), Non So (2006)
- Fulke Walwyn Kim Muir Challenge Cup - (3) Master Bob (1990), The Bushkeeper (2002), Juveigneur (2005)
- Johnny Henderson Grand Annual Chase - (2) Greenhope (2006), Bellvano (2012)
- Martin Pipe Conditional Jockeys' Handicap Hurdle - (1) Andytown (2009)
- Golden Miller Novices' Chase - (1) Chantry House (2021)
- Cathcart Challenge Cup - (4) Brown Windsor (1990), Raymylette (1994), Stormyfairweather (1999, 2000)
- Pertemps Final - (2) Call The Cops (2015), Doddiethegreat (2025)
- National Hunt Chase Challenge Cup - (1) Holloway Queen (2026)

== Major wins ==
(United Kingdom) Great Britain

- Fighting Fifth Hurdle - (9) Landing Light (2001), Punjabi (2008), My Tent Or Yours (2013), Buveur d'Air (2017, 2018), Epatante (2020, 2021 (dead heat)), Constitution Hill (2022), Sir Gino (2024)
- Henry VIII Novices' Chase - (6) Acre Hill (1990), Fondmort (2001), Captain Conan (2012), Altior (2016), Jonbon (2022), Lulamba (2025)
- Tingle Creek Chase - (4) Sprinter Sacre (2012), Altior (2018), Jonbon (2023, 2024)
- Long Walk Hurdle – (3) Punchestowns (2008), Champ (2021),Impose Toi (2025)
- Kauto Star Novices' Chase - (5) Sparkling Flame (1990), Mutare (1991), Fiddling the Facts (1997), Bacchanal (2000), Long Run (2009)
- Christmas Hurdle - (14) Geos (2000), Landing Light (2001), Binocular (2010, 2011), Darlan (2012), My Tent Or Yours (2013), Buveur d'Air (2017), Verdana Blue (2018), Epatante (2019, 2021), Constitution Hill (2022, 2023, 2024), Sir Gino (2025)
- King George VI Chase - (3) Long Run (2010, 2012), Might Bite (2017)
- Finale Juvenile Hurdle - (4) Mister Banjo (1999), Nas Na Riogh (2002), Blue Shark (2005), We Have A Dream (2017)
- Challow Novices' Hurdle - (2) Captain Cutter (2014), Champ (2019)
- Tolworth Novices' Hurdle - (7) New York Rainbow (1992), Minella Class (2011), Captain Conan (2012), Royal Boy (2014), L'ami Serge (2015), Constitution Hill (2022), Jango Baie (2023)
- Clarence House Chase - (8) Big Matt (1996), Isio (2004), Tysou (2006), Sprinter Sacre (2013), Altior (2019), Shishkin (2022), Jonbon (2025, 2026)
- Scilly Isles Novices' Chase - (6) First Bout (1987), Punchestowns (2010), Captain Conan (2013), Oscar Whisky (2014), Top Notch (2017), Terrefort (2018)
- Ascot Chase - (5) Tiutchev (2001), Riverside Theatre (2011,2012), Shishkin (2023), Jonbon (2026)
- Manifesto Novices' Chase - (2) Mad Max (2010), Captain Conan (2013)
- Anniversary 4-Y-O Novices' Hurdle - (4) Binocular (2008), We Have A Dream (2018), Pentland Hills (2019), Sir Gino (2024)
- Betway Bowl - (3) Might Bite (2018), Shishkin (2023), Jango Baie (2026)
- Aintree Hurdle - (6) Oscar Whisky (2011, 2012), Buveur d'Air (2017), L'Ami Serge (2018), Epatante (2022), Constitution Hill (2023)
- Top Novices' Hurdle - (6) General Miller (2010), Darlan (2012), My Tent Or Yours (2013), Josses Hill (2014), Buveur d'Air (2016), Jonbon (2022)
- Mildmay Novices' Chase - (6) Sparkling Flame (1991), Irish Hussar (2003), Burton Port (2010), Might Bite (2017), Terrefort (2018), Chantry House (2021)
- Melling Chase - (5) Remittance Man (1992), Finian's Rainbow (2012), Sprinter Sacre (2013), Jonbon (2024, 2025)
- Maghull Novices' Chase - (4) Finian's Rainbow (2011), Sprinter Sacre (2012), Shishkin (2021), Jonbon (2023)
- Sefton Novices' Hurdle - (4) Rustle (1988), Beat That (2014), Santini (2018), Champ (2019)
- Mersey Novices' Hurdle - (2) Spirit Son (2011), Simonsig (2012)
- Liverpool Hurdle - (2) Whisper (2014, 2015)
- Celebration Chase - (7) French Opera (2011), Sprinter Sacre (2016), Altior (2017, 2018, 2019), Jonbon (2023,2024)

(Republic of Ireland) Ireland

- Punchestown Champion Chase - (2) Big Matt (1998), Get Real (2000), Sprinter Sacre (2013)
- Punchestown Champion Hurdle - (1) Buveur d'Air (2019)
- Champion INH Flat Race - (1) Royal Rosa (2003)
- Savills Chase - (1) Bobs Worth (2013)
- Ryanair Novice Chase - (1) Tiutchev (2000)
- Champion Four Year Old Hurdle - (5) Katarino (1999), Punjabi (2007), Grandouet (2011), Fusil Raffles (2019), Lulamba (2025)
- Mares Champion Hurdle - (1) Marie's Rock (2022)

France

- Grande Course de Haies d'Auteuil - (1) L'Ami Serge (2017)

United States

- Grand National Hurdle Stakes - (1) Brain Power (2019)
