= David Elsworth =

British racehorse trainer

Personal information
- Born: Salisbury, Wiltshire
- Occupation: Trainer

Horse racing career
- Sport: Horse racing

Major racing wins
- British Classics wins: King George VI Chase (1986, 1988, 1989, 1990); Grand National (1988); Queen Mother Champion Chase (1990); International race wins: Irish Grand National (1990); Irish 1000 Guineas (1990)

Significant horses
- Desert Orchid, Rhyme 'n' Reason, Persian Punch, In the Groove

David Raymond Cecil Elsworth (born 1939) is a British retired horse trainer. He was the trainer of Desert Orchid, winning the King George VI Chase on four occasions, as well as the 1989 Cheltenham Gold Cup and the 1990 Irish Grand National. He trained the 1988 Grand National winner Rhyme 'n' Reason, and 1990 Queen Mother Champion Chase winner Barnbrook Again. He was British jump racing Champion Trainer 1987–88.

Elsworth also had success on the flat, winning the 1990 Irish 1000 Guineas with In the Groove.

== Life and career ==
David Elsworth was born and raised in Salisbury, Wiltshire. After leaving school aged 15, he began his career as a stable lad for Alec Kilpatrick at Richard Hannon racing, before going on to be a professional jump jockey from 1957 to 1972. He was aged 17 when he rode his first winner as a jockey in the Cowley Novices Hurdle onboard Rathrowan in October 1957.

Whilst coming to the end of his jockey career, his training career started as an assistant to Ricky Vallance, at Bishops Cannings in Wiltshire. When Vallance lost his training licence Elsworth took a job as a market trader before setting up as a trainer in his own right. He trained at Whitsbury, near Salisbury, where he trained horses for 25 years, before moving to Egerton House Stables at Newmarket in 2006. He was the trainer of Desert Orchid, winning the King George VI Chase on four occasions, as well as the 1989 Cheltenham Gold Cup and 1990 Irish Grand National. He trained the 1988 Grand National winner with Rhyme 'n' Reason, and 1990 Queen Mother Champion Chase winner Barnbrook Again.

He was British jump racing Champion Trainer 1987–88.

Elsworth also had success on the flat, with Persian Punch, and won the 1990 Irish 1000 Guineas with In the Groove.
