= 2014 Champion Hurdle =

Horse race

84th Champion Hurdle
- Champion Hurdle
- Location: Cheltenham Racecourse
- Date: 11 March 2014
- Winning horse: Jezki (IRE)
- Jockey: Barry Geraghty
- Trainer: Jessica Harrington (IRE)
- Owner: J. P. McManus

The 2014 Champion Hurdle was a horse race held at Cheltenham Racecourse on Tuesday 11 March 2014. It was the 84th running of the Champion Hurdle.

The winner was J. P. McManus's Jezki, a six-year-old gelding trained in Ireland by Jessica Harrington, who was winning the race for the first time. The winning jockey was Barry Geraghty, who had won the race on Punjabi in 2009.

The only previous winner of the race was Hurricane Fly, who had won in 2011 and 2013. A. P. McCoy opted to ride My Tent Or Yours rather than Jezki. All nine of the runners had previously won at Grade I level. Our Conor was fatally injured in a fall at the third hurdle.

== Race details ==
- Sponsor: Stan James
- Purse: £400,000; First prize: £238,051
- Going: Good to Soft
- Distance: 2 miles 110 yards
- Number of runners: 9
- Winner's time: 3m 45.25

== Full result ==
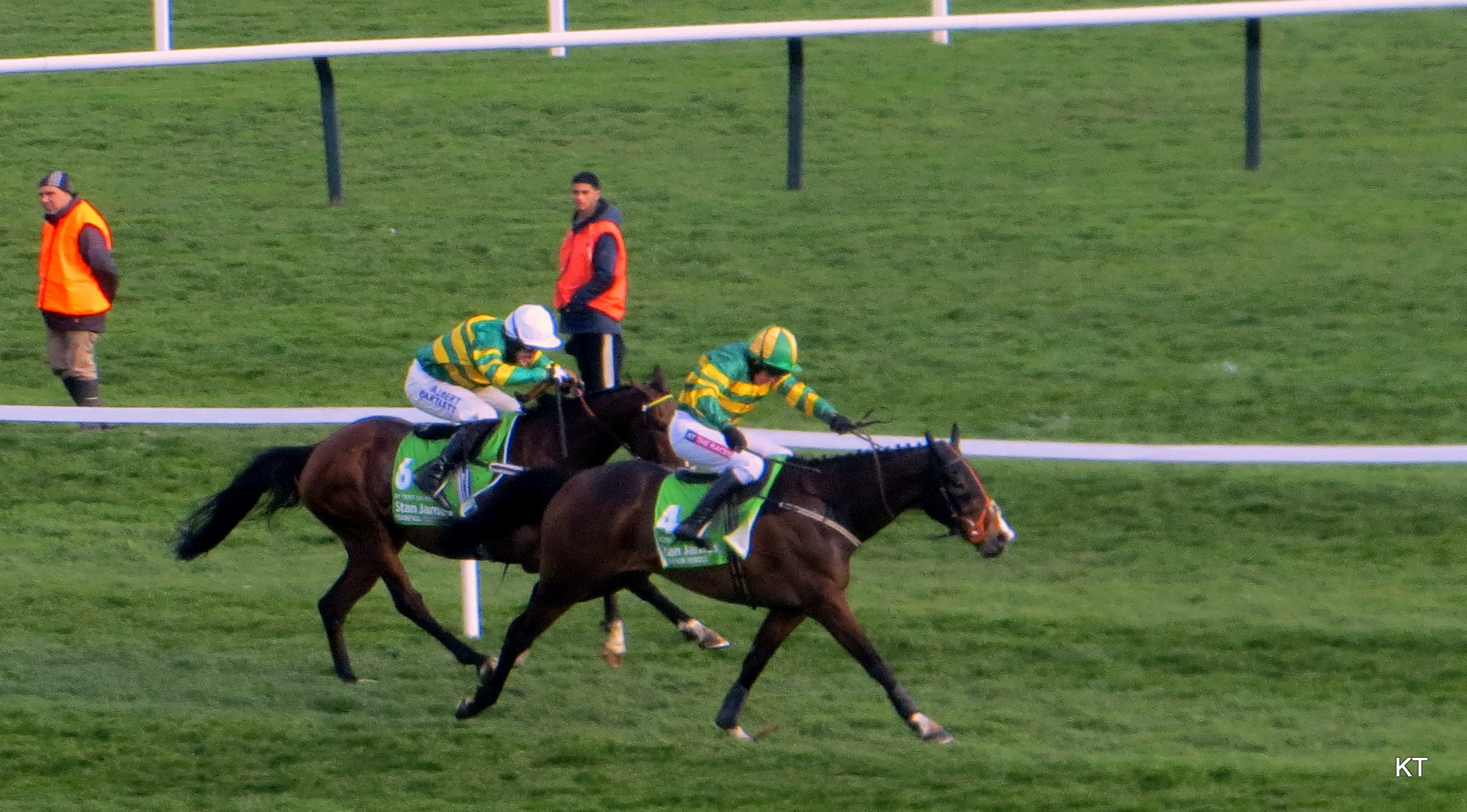
Jezki wins the Champion Hurdle

Pos.	Marg.	Horse (bred)	Age	Jockey	Trainer (Country)	Odds
1		Jezki (IRE)	6	Barry Geraghty	Jessica Harrington (IRE)	9/1
2	nk	My Tent Or Yours (IRE)	7	Tony McCoy	Nicky Henderson (GB)	3/1
3	2½	The New One (IRE)	6	Sam Twiston-Davies	Nigel Twiston-Davies (GB)	100/30
4	2¼	Hurricane Fly (IRE)	10	Ruby Walsh	Willie Mullins (IRE)	11/4 fav
5	7	Captain Cee Bee (IRE)	13	Mark Walsh	Edward Harty (IRE)	100/1
6	2½	Ptit Zig (FR)	5	Daryl Jacob	Paul Nicholls (GB)	28/1
7	4½	Melodic Rendezvous (GB)	8	Nick Scholfield	Jeremy Scott (GB)	20/1
8	11	Grumeti (GB)	6	Wayne Hutchinson	Alan King (GB)	66/1
Fell		Our Conor (IRE)	5	Danny Mullins	Dessie Hughes (IRE)	5/1

- Abbreviations: nse = nose; nk = neck; hd = head; dist = distance

== Winner's details ==
Further details of the winner, Jezki.

- Sex: Gelding
- Foaled: 8 March 2008
- Country: Ireland
- Sire: Milan; Dam: La Noire (Phardante)
- Owner: J. P. McManus
- Breeder: Gerard McGrath
