= Neptune Investment Management Novices' Hurdle (disambiguation) =

The Neptune Investment Management Novices' Hurdle was the sponsored title of the following horse races;

- Hyde Novices' Hurdle, a race run at Cheltenham in November
- Winter Novices' Hurdle, a race run at Sandown Park Racecourse in December
- Leamington Novices' Hurdle, a race run at Warwick in January
- Classic Novices' Hurdle, a race run at Cheltenham in January
- Baring Bingham Novices' Hurdle, a race run at Cheltenham in March
