= Ballymore Novices' Hurdle =

Ballymore Novices' Hurdle may refer to:

- Baring Bingham Novices' Hurdle, a horse race at Cheltenham Racecourse in March
- Classic Novices' Hurdle, a horse race at Cheltenham Racecourse in January
- Hyde Novices' Hurdle, a horse race at Cheltenham Racecourse in November
- Leamington Novices' Hurdle, a defunct horse race at Warwick Racecourse
- Winter Novices' Hurdle, a horse race at Sandown Park Racecourse
