= Road to Cheltenham =

The Road to Cheltenham is a series of seven British and Irish top-class horse races over hurdles, culminating in the Champion Hurdle at the Cheltenham Festival. The Road To Cheltenham is a concept developed by Racing For Change – an arm of the British Horseracing Authority charged with leading a fundamental reappraisal of the way racing is promoted – and the online sportsbook StanJames.com.

The seven races that comprise The Road To Cheltenham are the Elite Hurdle at Wincanton Racecourse in November, the Greatwood Hurdle at Cheltenham Racecourse in November, the Morgiana Hurdle at Punchestown Racecourse, Ireland, in November, the Fighting Fifth Hurdle at Newcastle Racecourse in November, the International Hurdle at Cheltenham Racecourse in December, the Champion Hurdle Trial at Haydock Park in January, and the Champion Hurdle at The Cheltenham Festival in March.

The overall concept of The Road To Cheltenham revolves around the basic premise of raising the profile of British horse racing among the general public's consciousness and thus attracting new followers to British horse racing.

The Road To Cheltenham series is part of a five-year sponsorship deal signed by StanJames.com. The deal begins with the 2010 Fighting Fifth Hurdle.
