= Rhinestone Cowboy (horse) =

Irish-bred Thoroughbred racehorse

- Sire: Be My Native
- Dam: Monumental Gesture
- Damsire: Head For Heights
- Sex: Gelding
- Foaled: 1996
- Country: Ireland
- Colour: Bay
- Breeder: Mrs Frances Whelan
- Owner: John Magnier
- Trainer: Jonjo O'Neill
- Record: 17: 10-1-2
- Earnings: £300,058

Major wins
- Rossington Main Novices' Hurdle (2003); Kingwell Hurdle (2003); Agfa Hurdle (2004); Aintree Hurdle (2004); Punchestown Stayers Hurdle (2004)

Rhinestone Cowboy is an Irish bred racehorse. He was trained in England by Jonjo O'Neill. In a career which lasted from 2002 until 2007 he ran seventeen times and won ten races including two Grade I hurdle races.

== Debut ==
He made his racecourse debut in February 2002, winning a National Hunt Flat race at Ascot. His trainer them immediately stepped him up to the top level, where he contested the Champion Bumper at the Cheltenham Festival. Sent off the 5/2 favourite for the race, he finished second, when he was carried left in the closing stages of the race by the eventual winner, Pizarro.

== 2002/2003 season ==
He made his 2002/03 seasonal debut when winning a Listed Class Bumper at Cheltenham in November. He was then sent hurdling, where he went to complete a four - timer over the obstacles, which culminated in a victory in the Kingwell Hurdle as a novice. The reigning Champion Hurdle winner, Hors La Loi was back in third place. In his next start, the novice was sent off the 5/2 favourite for the Champion Hurdle at Cheltenham, where he finished third behind Rooster Booster.

== 2003/2004 season ==
The 2003/04 season proved by far to be Rhinestone Cowboy's best season. He started with victory in a handicap Hurdle at Haydock, before finishing down the field in the December Festival Hurdle. He then resumed winning ways in the Agfa Hurdle at Sandown in February, before returning to the Cheltenham Festival, where he finished third in the Coral Cup. It was in his next two starts that Rhinestone Cowboy showed how good he was. First, he won the Aintree Hurdle, where he overturned the previous season's Champion Hurdle form by beating Rooster Booster and Westender. More Grade 1 success followed 3 weeks later, as he won the Punchestown Stayers Hurdle on his first try over 3 miles. He had odds on stablemate Iris's Gift back in second that day.

== Leg injury ==
Rhinestone Cowboy suffered a leg injury in November 2004, which all but ended his racing career. He did come back in the 2006/07 season, where he finished down the field in Handicap Hurdles.

== Today ==
The horse has not raced since March 2007 and it is thought that he has now been retired.
