= Albert Bartlett Novices' Hurdle =

The Albert Bartlett Novices' Hurdle is the sponsored title of several different National Hunt horse races in Great Britain.

It may refer to:

- Spa Novices' Hurdle, a Grade 1 race held during the Cheltenham Festival in March
- River Don Novices' Hurdle, a Grade 2 race held at Doncaster in late January or early February
- Prestige Novices' Hurdle, a Grade 2 race held at Haydock Park in February
- Bristol Novices' Hurdle, a Grade 2 race held at Cheltenham in December
- Hyde Novices' Hurdle, a Grade 2 race held at Cheltenham in November
