= Our Conor =

Irish Thoroughbred racehorse

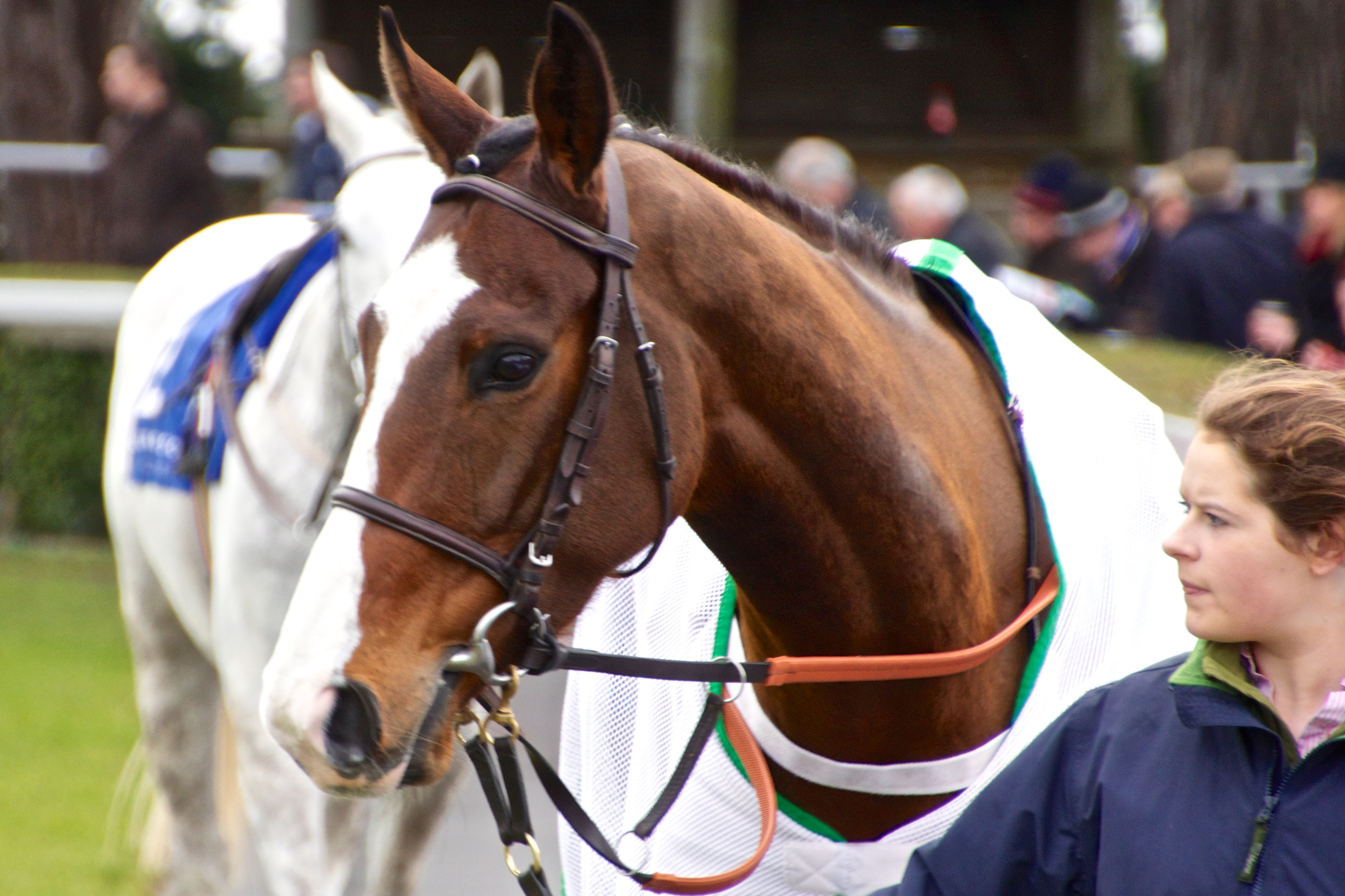
- Our Conor at Leopardstown in February 2013.
- Sire: Jeremy
- Grandsire: Danehill Dancer
- Dam: Flamands
- Damsire: Sadler's Wells
- Sex: Gelding
- Foaled: 28 April 2009
- Country: Ireland
- Colour: Bay
- Breeder: Gerrardstown House Stud
- Owner: Man About Town Syndicate; Barry Connell
- Trainer: Dessie Hughes
- Record: 14:6-2-3
- Earnings: £168,198

Major wins
- Bar One Racing Juvenile Hurdle (2012); Spring Juvenile Hurdle (2013); Triumph Hurdle (2013)

Our Conor (28 April 2009 – 11 March 2014) was an Irish Thoroughbred racehorse best known for his performances in hurdle racing. As a four-year-old he won the Grade I Spring Juvenile Hurdle and then recorded an impressive fifteen-length win in the Triumph Hurdle at the Cheltenham Festival. A year later he was fatally injured when falling in the Champion Hurdle.

== Background ==
Our Conor was a bay horse with a white blaze and four socks bred in County Meath by the Gerrardstown House Stud. He was named after an owners grandson, Conor who was born in November 2011. He was sired by Jeremy, an American-bred horse who won the Jersey Stakes in 2006 and the Sandown Mile in the following year. Apart from Our Conor, the most successful of his progeny have been the Concorde Stakes winner Yellow Rosebud. and the 2023 Grand National winner Corach Rambler. Our Conor's dam Flamands won two races and was a granddaughter of Sweet Mimosa who won the Prix de Diane and was a full sister of the Prix de l'Arc de Triomphe winner Levmoss and the dual Ascot Gold Cup winner Le Moss.

As a yearling colt, Our Conor was sent to the Tattersalls Ireland sales in September 2010 where he was bought for €4,500 by Sean Tiernan privately for Noel Hayes, whereafter he went into training with Eoin Griffin in Kilkenny. He subsequently entered the ownership of the Man About Town Syndicate and was sent into training with Dessie Hughes at The Curragh, County Kildare.

== Racing career ==
=== 2012 Flat season ===
Our Connor began his racing career on the flat as a three-year-old in 2012. After finishing unplaced on his debut at the Curragh he recorded his first success when he won a seven furlong maiden race at Roscommon Racecourse on 11 June. He followed up later that month by carrying 129 pounds to victory in a one-mile handicap race at Naas. He continued to run in handicaps at around a mile, finishing third at Leopardstown, second at Galway and third at Listowel.

=== 2012/2013 National Hunt Season ===
During the 2012/2013 National Hunt season Our Conor was campaigned in novice hurdles and was ridden in all four of his races by Bryan Cooper. On his debut over obstacles he started 8/13 for a maiden hurdle at Navan on 11 November. He took the lead at the second last hurdle and accelerated clear of his opponents to win by eight and a half lengths from Casual Creeper. Three weeks later he was moved up in class for the Grade III Bar One Racing Juvenile Hurdle at Fairyhouse and won by two and a half lengths after taking the lead two hurdles from the finish.

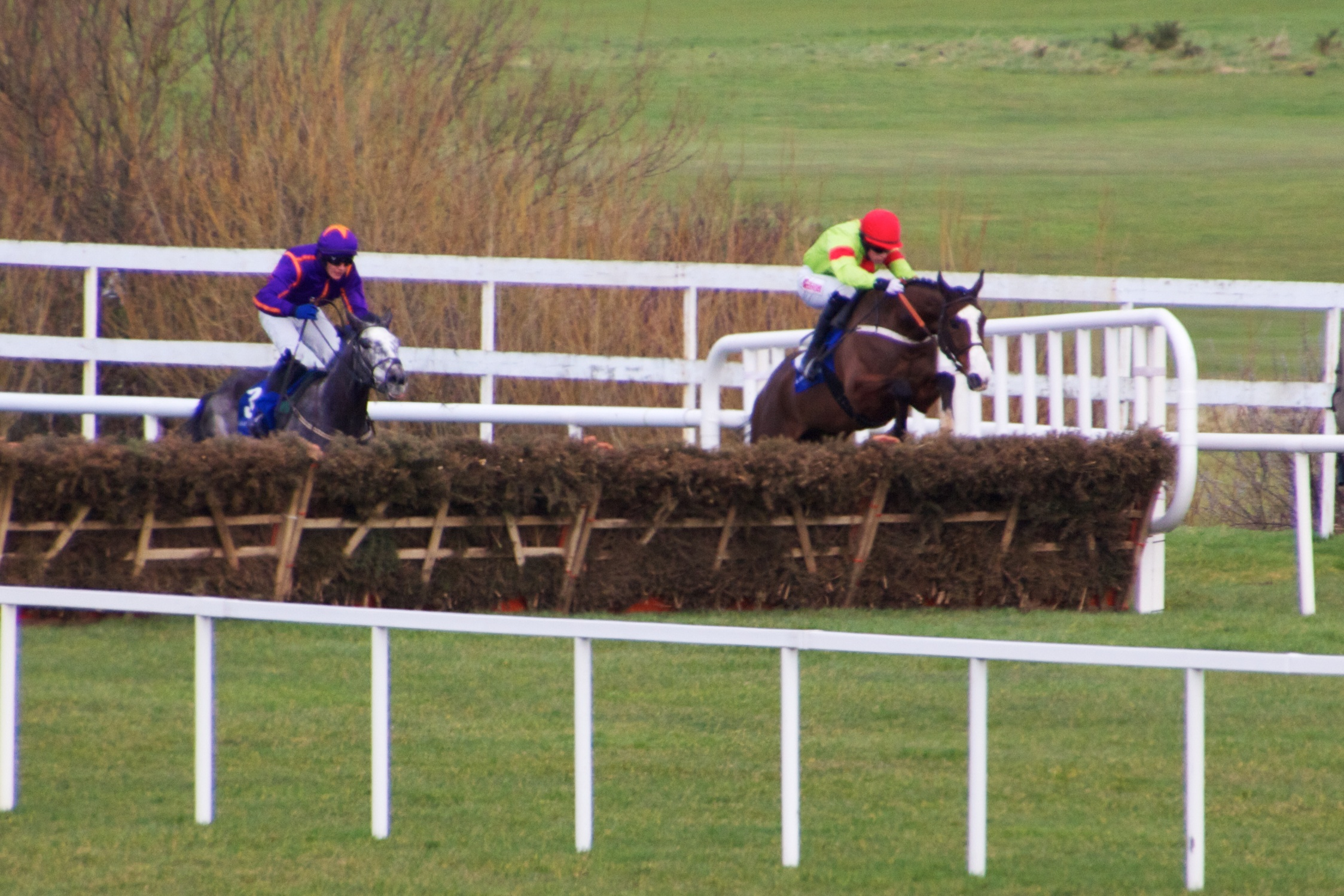
Our Conor leads Diakali in the 2013 Spring Juvenile Hurdle at Leopardstown.

On 9 February, Our Conor was one of seven four-year-old to contest the Grade I Spring Juvenile Hurdle at Leopardstown and started second favourite behind the Willie Mullins trained Diakali. He was restrained by Cooper in the early stages before moving up to overtake Diakali approaching the last and went on to win "comfortably" by five lengths. On his final appearance of the season, Our Conor was sent to England for the Grade I Triumph Hurdle on 15 March at the Cheltenham Festival. Starting at odds of 5/1, he tracked Diakali before taking the lead at the second last. He quickly drew away from the field and won by fifteen lengths from the Paul Nicholls-trained Far West. After the race Dessie Hughes said "everything went well and he jumped brilliant – he's a real one isn't he? I couldn't expect a performance like that. He was on the bit all the way, he was loving it. We've had no problems with him whatsoever. He eats and sleeps and any ground is fine for him. He is certainly a Champion Hurdle horse. He stays, he has foot and he jumps".

Four days after his win at Cheltenham it was announced that Our Conor had been bought for an undisclosed sum by Barry Connell who had previously attempted to buy the horse after he won at Fairyhouse in December.

=== 2013/2014 National Hunt Season ===
Danny Mullins took over from Bryan Cooper as Our Conor's regular jockey in 2013/2014. The gelding prepared for the new season with a run on the flat, finishing fourth when favourite for the October Handicap at Naas. He returned to hurdling in December and started 3/1 third favourite behind the reigning champion Hurricane Fly and the Jessica Harrington-trained Jezki in the Grade I Ryanair Hurdle at Leopardstown. He briefly held the lead after the second last but was soon overtaken and weakened in the closing stages behind Hurricane Fly and Jezki, beaten just under six lengths by the winner. the first three met again in the Irish Champion Hurdle over the same course and distance a month later. Our Conor produced an improved performance, finishing second, a length and a half behind Hurricane Fly, with Jezki in fourth.

Our Conor appeared for the second time at Cheltenham when he was one of nine runners for the Champion Hurdle. In a strong field (all nine had won at Grade I level) he was the fourth choice in the betting behind Hurricane Fly, My Tent Or Yours and The New One. Our Conor went to the front from the start and disputed the lead with the pacemaker over the first two hurdles. At the third he fell heavily, sustaining a serious injury to his back. He was attended by veterinary surgeons for several minutes, but his injury was too severe to be treated and he was euthanised. His death drew criticism from the animal rights organisation, Animal Aid which described the Cheltenham course as "the most lethal in the country"; claims which are completely unfounded and have never been proven by any animal-welfare or horse-racing body.

== Pedigree ==
Pedigree of Our Conor, bay gelding, 2009
Sire Jeremy (USA) 2003	Danehill Dancer (IRE); 1993	Danehill	Danzig
Sire Jeremy (USA) 2003	Danehill Dancer (IRE); 1993	Danehill	Razyana
Sire Jeremy (USA) 2003	Danehill Dancer (IRE); 1993	Mira Adonde	Sharpen Up
Sire Jeremy (USA) 2003	Danehill Dancer (IRE); 1993	Mira Adonde	Lettre d'Amour
Sire Jeremy (USA) 2003	Glint In Her Eye (USA); 1996	Arazi	Blushing Groom
Sire Jeremy (USA) 2003	Glint In Her Eye (USA); 1996	Arazi	Danseur Fabuleux
Sire Jeremy (USA) 2003	Glint In Her Eye (USA); 1996	Wind In Her Hair	Alzao
Sire Jeremy (USA) 2003	Glint In Her Eye (USA); 1996	Wind In Her Hair	Burghclere
Dam Flamands (IRE) 1993	Sadler's Wells (USA); 1981	Northern Dancer	Nearctic
Dam Flamands (IRE) 1993	Sadler's Wells (USA); 1981	Northern Dancer	Natalma
Dam Flamands (IRE) 1993	Sadler's Wells (USA); 1981	Fairy Bridge	Bold Reason
Dam Flamands (IRE) 1993	Sadler's Wells (USA); 1981	Fairy Bridge	Special
Dam Flamands (IRE) 1993	Fleur Royale (IRE); 1983	Mill Reef	Never Bend
Dam Flamands (IRE) 1993	Fleur Royale (IRE); 1983	Mill Reef	Milan Mill
Dam Flamands (IRE) 1993	Fleur Royale (IRE); 1983	Sweet Mimosa	Le Levanstell
Dam Flamands (IRE) 1993	Fleur Royale (IRE); 1983	Sweet Mimosa	Feemoss (Family number 1-k)
