= The New One (horse) =

Irish-bred Thoroughbred racehorse

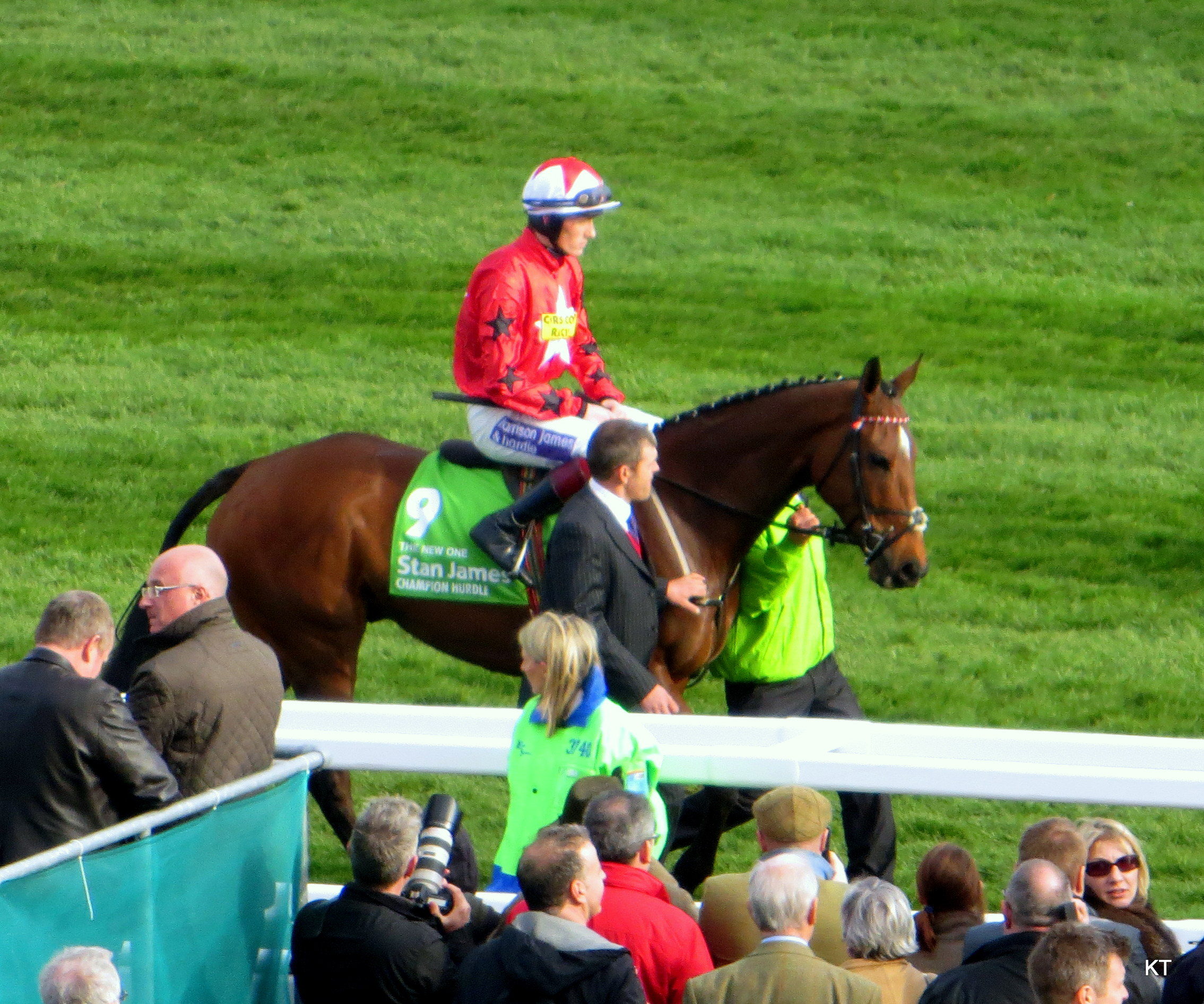
- The New One at Cheltenham in March 2014.
- Sire: King's Theatre
- Grandsire: Sadler's Wells
- Dam: Thuringe
- Damsire: Turgeon
- Sex: Gelding
- Foaled: 23 February 2008
- Country: Ireland
- Colour: Bay
- Breeder: R Brown & Ballylinch Stud
- Owner: Simon & Sarah Such & C G Paletta
- Trainer: Nigel Twiston-Davies
- Record: 40:20-7-2
- Earnings: £1,048,354

Major wins
- Champion Standard Open NH Flat Race (2012); Leamington Novices' Hurdle (2013); Baring Bingham Novices' Hurdle (2013); International Hurdle (2013, 2014, 2016); Aintree Hurdle (2014); Champion Hurdle Trial (2015, 2016, 2017, 2018); Welsh Champion Hurdle (2017)
- Last updated on 20 January 2018

The New One (23 February 2008 – 31 October 2020) was an Irish-bred, British-trained Thoroughbred racehorse who competed in National Hunt races. In a career running from November 2011 to December 2018 he ran in 40 races, winning 20 times, being placed a further nine times and earning over £1,000,000 in win and place prize money. In the 2011/2012 National Hunt season he won three of his four races when competing in National Hunt Flat races including the Champion Standard Open NH Flat Race at Aintree Racecourse. In the following year, competing over hurdles, he won four of his six starts including the Leamington Novices' Hurdle and the Baring Bingham Novices' Hurdle at the Cheltenham Festival. In the following season he won the International Hurdle and finished third in Champion Hurdle before winning the Aintree Hurdle. In the 2014/15 season he won his first four races including a second International Hurdle and the Champion Hurdle Trial. He went on to win three more Champion Hurdle Trials, a third International Hurdle and a Welsh Champion Hurdle. The New One was retired after being pulled up in the International Hurdle at Cheltenham on 15 December 2018.

== Background ==
The New One was a bay gelding with a white star bred in Ireland by R. Brown and the Ballylinch Stud. He is one of many successful National Hunt horses sired by the King George VI and Queen Elizabeth Stakes winner King's Theatre. He is the first foal of his dam Thuringe, a poor racehorse who failed to win in ten races in France and was retired after being pulled up in her only attempt over hurdles in England.

As a colt foal, The New One was consigned to the Tattersalls Ireland sale in November 2008 where he was bought for €9,500 by Justin Rea. He had been gelded by the time he returned to the sales a year later when he was sold by Rea for €26,000 to Philip Dempsey. He was offered for sale for a third time at Tatteralls Ireland as a three-year-old in June 2011 being consigned by Cleaboy Stud and Coppice Farm, and purchased for €25,000 by representatives of Highflyer Bloodstock. The New One was sent into training with Nigel Twiston-Davies at Naunton in Gloucestershire and has been ridden in most of his races by his trainer's son Sam Twiston-Davies.

== Racing career ==
=== 2011/2012 National Hunt season ===
The New One began his racing career in National Hunt Flat races, also known as "bumpers", starting with a fourteen furlong event for three-year-olds at Warwick Racecourse on 16 November. Starting the 11/4 favourite against fifteen opponents, he took the lead three furlong from the finish and went clear in the closing stages to win by three and a quarter lengths from Dalavar. On 1 January at Cheltenham Racecourse, The New One followed up by beating fourteen opponents in another NHF race, taking the lead approaching the final furlong and winning by one and three quarter lengths from Chancery. On 14 March, The New One was moved up in class to contest the Grade I Champion Bumper at the Cheltenham Festival. Starting at odds of 12/1 in a field of twenty runners he tracked the leaders, but appeared outpaced in the closing stages and finished sixth, six lengths behind the Willie Mullins-trained Champagne Fever. A month later, The New One appeared at Aintree Racecourse where he was one of nineteen runner for the Grade II Champion Standard Open NH Flat Race. Sam Twiston-Davies restrained the gelding just behind the leaders before overtaking the five-year-old My Tent Or Yours inside the final furlong and winning by one and a quarter lengths.

=== 2012/2013 National Hunt season ===
In the 2012/2013 National Hunt season, The New One was campaigned in Novice Hurdle races. On his debut over obstacles he started 2/7 favourite against eight opponents at Newton Abbot Racecourse on 1 October and won by twenty-six length after leading from the start. Eighteen days later he started favorite for a Novice Hurdle at Cheltenham and won by two and three-quarter lengths from Village Vic, to whom he was conceding five pounds. The New One was moved up in class in January when he contested the Grade II Leamington Novices' Hurdle at Warwick Racecourse. Starting the 1/2 favourite, he took the lead approaching the seventh hurdle and drew away in the closing stages to win by sixteen lengths from the mare Mickie. After the race Nigel Twiston-Davies said; "He really could be the best one we’ve ever had. And he's so relaxed. He ran four months after we put a saddle on him for the first time. As soon as we put tack on him he was going up the gallop as fast as anything else." Two weeks later, in the Classic Novices' Hurdle at Cheltenham, The New One started 4/5 favourite ahead of Coneygree, a gelding who had won both the Hyde Novices' Hurdle and the Bristol Novices' Hurdle. The New One overtook Coneygree approaching the final hurdle but was overtaken on the run-in and was beaten a neck by the A. P. McCoy ridden six-year-old At Fisher's Cross.

At the 2013 Cheltenham Festival, The New One contested the Grade I Baring Bingham Novices' Hurdle over two miles, five furlongs and started 7/2 second favourite behind the unbeaten Irish-trained five-year-old Pont Alexandre. Sam Twiston-Davies settled the horse just behind the leaders and took the lead from Pont Alexandre approaching the final hurdle. The New One stayed on strongly on the run-in to win by four lengths from Rule The World with Pont Alexandre four and a half lengths further back in third. Nigel Twiston-Davies admitted to being so nervous that he spent most of the race in the toilet, only emerging for the closing stages. He went on to say that while the horse could compete in steeplechases in the following season it was also possible that The New One would be dropped back in distance to contest the 2014 Champion Hurdle. On his final appearance of the season The New One was matched against more experienced hurdlers in the Aintree Hurdle on 4 April and was made favourite ahead of Grandouet, Oscar Whisky (winner of the race in 2011 and 2012), Zarkandar, Thousand Stars (Grande Course de Haies d'Auteuil) and Countrywide Flame (Triumph Hurdle, Fighting Fifth Hurdle). The New One moved up to join the leaders with three hurdles left to negotiate, but has beaten half a length by Zarkandar in what the BBC described as "a thrilling finish".

=== 2013/2014 National Hunt season ===
On his seasonal debut in October, The New One ran in a two-mile hurdle race at Kempton Park for which his opponents included the 2012 Champion Hurdle winner Rock On Ruby. Starting the 1/2 favourite, The New One overtook Rock On Ruby two hurdles from the finish and went clear to win impressively by ten lengths despite being eased down by Twiston-Davies in the closing stages. On 14 December, the gelding faced Zarkandar, the horse which had beaten him at Aintree, in the Grade II International Hurdle at Cheltenham. The New One reversed the form from April, taking the lead approaching the final hurdle, and beating Zarkandar by six lengths. Nigel Twiston-Davies expressed his satisfaction with the winner saying "What I loved was when the other horse got to him he quickened away – that was Champion Hurdle-type acceleration". The betting for the Grade I Christmas Hurdle twelve days later was dominated by The New One and My Tent or Yours (winner of the Fighting Fifth Hurdle). The New One took the lead three hurdles out but lost momentum when making a bad mistake at the last which caused Sam Twiston-Davies to lose an iron. On the run-in The New One was strongly challenged by My Tent or Yours and beaten half a length after what Daily Telegraph described as "the best hurdle race run in England or Ireland this season". Nigel Twiston-Davies felt that the slow pace of the race had not favoured his horse's chances and said that he would probably run a pacemaker in the Champion Hurdle.

In the Champion Hurdle at Cheltenham on 11 March, The New One started the 100/30 third favourite behind Hurricane Fly and My Tent Or Yours. He appeared to be travelling well when he was badly hampered by the fall of Our Conor at the third hurdle and dropped to the back of the field. He stayed on strongly in the closing stages and finished third, beaten a neck and two and a half lengths by Jezki and My Tent Or Yours. On 3 April, The New One started the 4/9 favourite in his second attempt to win the Aintree Hurdle. He tracked the leaders before overtaking the leader Rock On Ruby after the second last hurdle and looked likely to win easily. In the closing stages however, Rock On Ruby rallied strongly and The New One had to be driven out strongly by Sam Twiston-Davies to maintain his advantage and win by a head.

=== 2014/2015 National Hunt season ===
The New One began his fourth season in the williamhill.com Hurdle at Kempton on 19 October. Conceding at least eight pounds to his six opponents he started at odds of 2/11 and won by two and a quarter lengths from Hint of Mint, with Twiston-Davies easing him down in the closing stages. On 22 November The New One started the 1/3 favorite for the Betfair Price Rush Hurdle, a newly instituted two mile hurdle race on soft ground at Haydock. The gelding raced in second before taking the lead after the final flight and accelerating away to win by two and three quarter lengths from Zamdy Man. Nigel Twiston-Davies said "His jumping was superb and I think we've got everything right now... I'm very excited – bring on the others!". Sam Twiston-Davies expressed his satisfaction with the way that the gelding had handled the soft ground and said that "on better ground the world is his oyster". On 13 December The New One started 4/7 favourite as he attempted to repeat his 2013 success in the International Hurdle. He raced behind the clear leader Zamdy Man before taking the lead at the final hurdle and accelerating away to win by four and a half lengths from Vaniteux. After the race his trainer said that The New One "wasn't flashy but he got the job done and did it very, very well".

On 17 January, The New One started the 1/6 favourite for the Champion Hurdle Trial at Haydock. Conceding eight pounds to six opponents of heavy ground, he jumped to the right at several hurdles, but gained the advantage on the run-in and won from the five-year-old Bertimont. The Racing Post described the performance as "unconvincing" and Sam Twiston-Davias admitted "I never imagined it being as hard as that." Nigel Twiston Davies, however, remained optimistic, pointing out that the ground was extremely testing and that the gelding had demonstrated his battling qualities in his first serious test of the season.

In the 2015 Champion Hurdle on 10 March, The New One was the most fancied British contenders, starting the 100/30 second favourite, but faced a strong Irish challenge from Hurricane Fly, Jezki and Faugheen. Despite jumping to the right again he was in contention for most of the race, tracking the leader Faugheen. He began to struggle approaching the final hurdle, and finished fifth behind Faugheen, Arctic Fire, Hurricane Fly and Jezki, beaten nine lengths by the winner.

=== 2015/2016 National Hunt season ===
In the following season The New One was sent odds-on favourite for his usual starting race, the Kempton Listed williamhill.com Hurdle. In the five-runner field he gave a weight advantage of eight pounds to three rivals and seven pounds to the eventual runner-up. After tracking the leaders for most part of the race at a slow pace, he sprinted for home at the last hurdle to win by two lengths and completed a hat-trick of this race. He then competed in the Grade 1 Christmas Hurdle where he finished seven lengths runner-up behind Faugheen but followed it a month later with a victory in the Grade 2 Champion Hurdle Trial which he also took last season on his way to Cheltenham Festival, of which his trainer Nigel Twiston-Davies said: "He'll be going to Cheltenham in better form this year. It was a struggle with his feet (last year), he did all his prep in the swimming pool. We were still only beaten by eight lengths and I'm hoping with a straight run at it we can be more competitive". In his third bid for the Champion Hurdle he finished fourth behind Annie Power, My Tent Or Yours and Nichols Canyon. On his final run of the season he fell for the first time in his career when coming down at the fifth flight of the Aintree Hurdle.

=== 2016/2017 National Hunt season ===
The New One began his next season with a third success in the International Hurdle, leading from the start and coming home three and a half lengths clear of My Tent Or Yours, to whom he was conceding eight pounds in weight. After finishing second to Yanworth in the Christmas Hurdle he took Haydock's Champion Hurdle Trial for the third consecutive year, jumping indifferently before rallying strongly in the closing stages and winning by a length from Clyne with L'Ami Serge in third. In his fourth Champion Hurdle The New One came home fifth of the eleven runners at odds of 10/1, beaten ten and a half lengths by the winner Buveur d'Air. His two subsequent appearances that season saw him finish third to Buveur d'Air in the Aintree Hurdle and fourth to L'Ami Serge in the Grade 2 Select Hurdle at Sandown Park.

=== 2017/2018 National Hunt season ===
On his first run of the new season The New One was ridden by the amateur Zac Baker in the Welsh Champion Hurdle at Ffos Las Racecourse and led from the start to win by a length from Clyne, to whom he was conceding eight pounds. He went on to run fourth under top weight in the Greatwood Handicap Hurdle, second to his old rival My Tent Or Yours in the International Hurdle and second to Buveur d'Air in the Christmas Hurdle. In January at Haydock he started favourite as he attempted to record his fourth win in a row in the Champion Hurdle Trial. After leading for most of the way he was overtaken by the seven-year-old Ch'tibello on the run-in but rallied "gamely" to regain the advantage and won by half a length. At the Cheltenham Festival he bypassed the Champion Hurdle to contest the Stayers' Hurdle over three miles but made little impact and came home twelfth of the thirteen finishers. On his last run of the season he was pulled up three flights from home in the Aintree Hurdle.

=== 2018/2019 National Hunt season ===
In October 2018 The New One attempted to repeat his 2017 success in the Welsh Champion Hurdle but finished seventh after losing a shoe in the race. In the International Hurdle on 15 December he led for most of the way but weakened badly from the third last hurdle and was pulled up before the final flight. He was retired from racing shortly afterwards.

== Retirement and death ==
In retirement The New One was cared for by Wayne Jones, who had been his groom during his racing career. He stayed active, taking part in hunting and horse shows. On 31 October 2020 he was found to be suffering from an inoperable case of horse colic and was euthanised. Jones commented "We're all absolutely gutted. I looked after him his whole life at Nigel Twiston-Davies's and I had him from when he retired. He's been a big part of my life for the last ten years. He was a fabulous horse, you couldn't knock him. He was such an easy horse to do anything with."

== Pedigree ==
Pedigree of The New One, bay gelding, 2008
Sire King's Theatre (IRE) 1991	Sadler's Wells (USA); 1981	Northern Dancer	Nearctic
Sire King's Theatre (IRE) 1991	Sadler's Wells (USA); 1981	Northern Dancer	Natalma
Sire King's Theatre (IRE) 1991	Sadler's Wells (USA); 1981	Fairy Bridge	Bold Reason
Sire King's Theatre (IRE) 1991	Sadler's Wells (USA); 1981	Fairy Bridge	Special
Sire King's Theatre (IRE) 1991	Regal Beauty (USA); 1981	Princely Native	Raise a Native
Sire King's Theatre (IRE) 1991	Regal Beauty (USA); 1981	Princely Native	Charlo
Sire King's Theatre (IRE) 1991	Regal Beauty (USA); 1981	Dennis Belle	Crafty Admiral
Sire King's Theatre (IRE) 1991	Regal Beauty (USA); 1981	Dennis Belle	Evasion
Dam Thuringe (FR) 2001	Turgeon (USA); 1986	Caro	Fortino
Dam Thuringe (FR) 2001	Turgeon (USA); 1986	Caro	Chambord
Dam Thuringe (FR) 2001	Turgeon (USA); 1986	Reiko	Targowice
Dam Thuringe (FR) 2001	Turgeon (USA); 1986	Reiko	Beronaire
Dam Thuringe (FR) 2001	L'Arme au Poing (FR); 1993	Comrade In Arms	Brigadier Gerard
Dam Thuringe (FR) 2001	L'Arme au Poing (FR); 1993	Comrade In Arms	Girl Friend
Dam Thuringe (FR) 2001	L'Arme au Poing (FR); 1993	Munsingen	Emerson
Dam Thuringe (FR) 2001	L'Arme au Poing (FR); 1993	Munsingen	Langenargen (Family 4-c)
