= Champion Hurdle Trial =

Hurdle horse race in Britain

Haydock Champion Hurdle Trial
2022
Tommy's Oscar	Global Citizen	Hunters Call

Previous years
2021
Navajo Pass	Buveur D'Air	Ballyandy

2020-2011
2020
Ballyandy	Pentland Hills	Cornerstone Lad
2019
Global Citizen	Silver Streak	Western Ryder
2018
The New One	Ch'tibello	Unison
2017
The New One	Clyne	L'Ami Serge
2016
The New One	Rayvin Black	Melodic Rendezvous
2015
The New One	Bertimont	Strongpoint
2014
Melodic Rendezvous	Ptit Zig	Jumps Road
2012
Celestial Halo	Desert Cry	Marsh Warbler

2010-2001
2010
Medermit	Punjabi	Afsoun
2009
Songe	Afsoun	Snap Tie
2007
Afsoun	The French Furze	Overstrand
2006
Al Eile	Mister McGoldrick	Faasel
2005
Inglis Drever	Mister McGoldrick	The French Furze
2004
Rooster Booster	Hasty Prince	Specular
2003
Flame Creek	October Mist	Ilnamar
2002
Rodock	The French Furze	Hunters Tweed

2000-1991
2000
Dato Star	Relkeel	Master Beveled
1999
Master Beveled	Wahiba Sands	Toto Toscato
1998
Dato Star	Collier Bay	Blowing Wind
1997
Mistinguett	Dato Star	Bimsey
1996
Mysilv	Atours	Pridwell
1995
Relkeel	Flakey Dove	Great Marquess
1994
Flakey Dove	Tiananmen Square	Sybillin
1993
Jinxy Jack	Coulton	Royal Derbi
1992
Granville Again	Winnie The Witch	Mardood

1990-1989
1990
Bank View	Vicario Di Bray	Milford Quay
1989
Vicario Di Bray	Celtic Shot	Floyd

The Champion Hurdle Trial is a Grade 2 National Hunt hurdle race in Great Britain held each January, which is open to horses aged four years or older. It is run at Haydock Park over a distance of about 1 mile 7½ furlongs (1 mile 7 furlongs and 144 yards, or 3,149 metres), and with nine hurdles. It is currently sponsored by Unibet. Since 2019, the race has carried the name of The New One, a racehorse who had won the race every year from 2015 to 2018.

The race was first run in 1981, and was awarded Grade 2 status in 2003.

The Champion Hurdle Trial is the third leg in the Unibet-sponsored Road to Cheltenham, and the final race of the series before the Champion Hurdle at the Cheltenham Festival. The other two races in the Road to Cheltenham are the Fighting Fifth Hurdle and the International Hurdle.

In April 2023 the British Horseracing Authority announced the removal of the Champion Hurdle Trial from the 2023/24 programme.

== Winners ==
Year	Winner	Age	Jockey	Trainer
1981	Starfen	9	Tim Easterby (Note: amateur jockey)	Peter Easterby
1982	Gaye Chance	7	Sam Morshead	Mercy Rimell
1983	Ekbalco	7	Jonjo O'Neill	Roger Fisher
1984	Abandoned because of frost
1986	Humberside Lady	5	Mark Dwyer	Geoff Huffer
1987	Nohalmdun	6	Lorcan Wyer	Peter Easterby
1988	Abandoned because of snow
1989	Vicario di Bray	6	Mark Dwyer	Jonjo O'Neill
1990	Bank View	5	Graham Bradley	Nigel Tinkler
1991	Abandoned because of frost
1992	Granville Again	6	Peter Scudamore	Martin Pipe
1993	Jinxy Jack	9	Neale Doughty	Gordon W. Richards
1994	Flakey Dove	8	Richard Dunwoody	Richard Price
1995	Relkeel	6	Adrian Maguire	David Nicholson
1996	Mysilv	6	Jamie Osborne	Charles Egerton
1997	Mistinguett	5	Carl Llewellyn	Nigel Twiston-Davies
1998	Dato Star	7	Lorcan Wyer	Malcolm Jefferson
1999	Master Beveled	9	Glenn Tormey	David Evans
2000	Dato Star	9	Lorcan Wyer	Malcolm Jefferson
2001	Abandoned due to frost
2002	Rodock	8	Tony McCoy	Martin Pipe
2003	Flame Creek	7	Seamus Durack	Noel Chance
2004	Rooster Booster	10	Richard Johnson	Philip Hobbs
2005	Inglis Drever	6	Graham Lee	Howard Johnson
2006	Al Eile	6	Timmy Murphy	John Queally
2007	Afsoun	5	Mick Fitzgerald	Nicky Henderson
2008	Abandoned because of waterlogging
2009	Songe	5	Tom Siddall	Charlie Longsdon
2010	Medermit	6	Robert Thornton	Alan King
2011	Abandoned because of frost
2012	Celestial Halo	8	Daryl Jacob	Paul Nicholls
2013	Abandoned because of snow
2014	Melodic Rendezvous	8	Nick Scholfield	Jeremy Scott
2015	The New One	7	Sam Twiston-Davies	Nigel Twiston-Davies
2016	The New One	8	Sam Twiston-Davies	Nigel Twiston-Davies
2017	The New One	9	Sam Twiston-Davies	Nigel Twiston-Davies
2018	The New One	10	Sam Twiston-Davies	Nigel Twiston-Davies
2019	Global Citizen	7	David Bass	Ben Pauling
2020	Ballyandy	9	Sam Twiston-Davies	Nigel Twiston-Davies
2021	Navajo Pass	5	Sean Quinlan	Donald McCain Jr
2022	Tommy's Oscar	7	Danny McMenamin	Ann Hamilton
2023	Abandoned because of a frozen track

== See also ==
- Horse racing in Great Britain
- List of British National Hunt races

== Sources ==
- Racing Post:
  - 1989, 1990, 1992, 1993, 1994, 1995, 1996, 1997, 1998, 1999
  - 2000, 2002, 2003, 2004, 2005, 2006, 2007, 2009, 2010, 2012
  - 2014, 2015, 2016, 2017, 2018, 2019, 2020, 2021
