= Top Novices' Hurdle =

Hurdle horse race in Britain

Top Novices' Hurdle
2026
Storming George	Sinnatra	Baron Noir

Previous years
2025
Salvator Mundi	Romeo Coolio	Karbau
2024
Mystical Power	Firefox	Lookaway
2023
Inthepocket	Strong Leader	Luccia
2022
Jonbon	El Fabiolo	Vina Ardanza
2021
Belfast Banter	Do Your Job	Dusart

2020-2011
2019
Felix Desjy	Aramon	Rouge Vif
2018
Lalor	Vision Des Flos	Bedrock
2017
Pingshou	Mount Mews	The Unit
2016
Buveur D'air	Petit Mouchoir	Limini
2015
Cyrus Darius	Vago Collonges	Qewy
2014
Josses Hill	Sgt Reckless	King of The Picts
2013
My Tent Or Yours	Forgotten Voice	Zuider Zee
2012
Darlan	Captain Conan	Prospect Wells
2011
Topolski	Oilily	Sire De Grugy

2010-2001
2010
General Miller	Menorah	Inventor
2009
El Dancer	American Trilogy	Somersby
2008
Pierrot Lunaire	Blue Bajan	Lazy Darren
2007
Blythe Knight	Osana	Ouninpohja
2006
Straw Bear	Conna Castle	The Duke's Speech
2005
Mighty Man	Dusky Warbler	Napolitain
2004
Royal Shakespeare	Contraband	Fleet Street
2003
Limerick Boy	Man O'Mystery	Lirfox
2002
In Contrast	Westender	April Louise
2001
Ilico	Hunters Tweed	Tidour

2000-1991
2000
Phardante Flyer	Gold Merit	Latalomne
1999
Joe Mac	Grecian Dart	Piped Aboard
1998
Fataliste	Dawn Leader	Petite Risk
1997
Midnight Legend	Sharpical	High in the Clouds
1996
Tragic Hero	Charming Girl	Castle Sweep
1995
Sweet Mignonette	Shankar	Captain Khedive
1994
Jazilah	Winter Forest	Dreams End
1993
Roll A Dollar	Gaelic Myth	Land Afar
1992
Carobee	Halkopous	Hangover
1991
Granville Again	Gran Alba	Young Pokey

1990-1988
1990
Fidway	Rakes Lane	Philosophos
1989
Young Benz	Decided	Redundant Pal
1988
Faraway Lad	Sea Island	Ryde Again

The Top Novices' Hurdle is a Grade One National Hunt hurdle race in Great Britain which is open to horses aged four years or older. It is run at Aintree over a distance of about 2 miles and half a furlong (2 miles and 103 yards, or 3,313 metres), and during its running there are nine hurdles to be jumped. The race is for novice hurdlers, and it is scheduled to take place each year during the Grand National meeting in early April.

The field usually includes horses which ran previously in the Supreme Novices' Hurdle, and the last to achieve victory in both events was Browne's Gazette in 1984. The Top Novices' Hurdle was upgraded to Grade One by the British Horseracing Authority from its 2016 running.

== Winners ==
Year	Winner	Age	Jockey	Trainer
1976	Beacon Light	5	Bob Turnell	Andy Turnell
1977	Irish Rambler	6	Joe Crowley	Joe Crowley
1978	Prousto	5	Jonjo O'Neill	Alan Jarvis
1979	Rimondo	4	Jonjo O'Neill	Ted Carter
1980	Jugador	5	Ron Davies	Derek Kent
1981	Burns	5	Bill Smith	Fulke Walwyn
1982	Bright Oasis	6	Allen Webb	Kim Bailey
1983	Very Promising	5	Sam Morshead	Mercy Rimell
1984	Browne's Gazette	6	Dermot Browne (Note: amateur jockey)	Michael Dickinson
1985	Sailor's Dance	5	Jimmy Duggan	Fred Winter
1986	I Bin Zaidoon	5	Graham McCourt	Jenny Pitman
1987	Convinced	5	Peter Scudamore	Martin Pipe
1988	Faraway Lad	5	Simon Sherwood	Oliver Sherwood
1989	Young Benz	5	Lorcan Wyer	Peter Easterby
1990	Fidway	5	Steve Smith Eccles	Tim Thomson Jones
1991	Granville Again	5	Peter Scudamore	Martin Pipe
1992	Carobee	5	Richard Dunwoody	David Nicholson
1993	Roll a Dollar	7	Paul Holley	David Elsworth
1994	Jazilah	6	Graham McCourt	Reg Akehurst
1995	Sweet Mignonette	7	Peter Niven	Mary Reveley
1996	Tragic Hero	4	Jonothan Lower	Martin Pipe
1997	Midnight Legend	6	Richard Johnson	David Nicholson
1998	Fataliste	4	Tony McCoy	Martin Pipe
1999	Joe Mac	5	Conor O'Dwyer	Christy Roche
2000	Phardante Flyer	6	Richard Johnson	Philip Hobbs
2001	Ilico II	5	Adrian Maguire	Philip Hobbs
2002	In Contrast	6	Richard Johnson	Philip Hobbs
2003	Limerick Boy	5	Tony Dobbin	Venetia Williams
2004	Royal Shakespeare	5	Robert Thornton	Steve Gollings
2005	Mighty Man	5	Richard Johnson	Henry Daly
2006	Straw Bear	5	Tony McCoy	Nick Gifford
2007	Blythe Knight	7	Tony McCoy	John Quinn
2008	Pierrot Lunaire	4	Ruby Walsh	Paul Nicholls
2009	El Dancer	5	Dominic Elsworth	Lucy Wadham
2010	General Miller	5	Barry Geraghty	Nicky Henderson
2011	Topolski	5	Daryl Jacob	David Arbuthnot
2012	Darlan	5	Tony McCoy	Nicky Henderson
2013	My Tent Or Yours	6	Tony McCoy	Nicky Henderson
2014	Josses Hill	6	Barry Geraghty	Nicky Henderson
2015	Cyrus Darius	6	Brian Hughes	Malcolm Jefferson
2016	Buveur d'Air	5	Noel Fehily	Nicky Henderson
2017	Pingshou	7	Robbie Power	Colin Tizzard
2018	Lalor	6	Richard Johnson	Kayley Woollacott
2019	Felix Desjy	6	Jack Kennedy	Gordon Elliott
	no race 2020 (Note: The 2020 running was cancelled because of the COVID-19 pandemic in the United Kingdom)
2021	Belfast Banter	6	Kevin Sexton	Peter Fahey
2022	Jonbon	6	Aidan Coleman	Nicky Henderson
2023	Inthepocket	6	Rachael Blackmore	Henry de Bromhead
2024	Mystical Power	5	Mark Walsh	Willie Mullins
2025	Salvator Mundi	5	Paul Townend	Willie Mullins
2026	Storming George	6	Jack Quinlan	Neil King

== See also ==
- Horse racing in Great Britain
- List of British National Hunt races
