= Jezki =

Irish-bred Thoroughbred racehorse

- Sire: Milan
- Grandsire: Sadler's Wells
- Dam: La Noire
- Damsire: Phardante
- Sex: Gelding
- Foaled: 8 March 2008
- Country: Ireland
- Colour: Bay
- Breeder: Gerard M. McGrath
- Owner: J. P. McManus
- Trainer: Jessica Harrington
- Record: 39:16-7-2
- Earnings: £968,358

Major wins
- Fishery Lane Hurdle (2012); Royal Bond Novice Hurdle (2012); Future Champions Novice Hurdle (2012); Champion Novice Hurdle (2013); WKD Hurdle (2013); Hatton's Grace Hurdle (2013); Champion Hurdle (2014); Racing Post Champion Hurdle (2014); Aintree Hurdle (2015); World Series Hurdle (2015); Istabraq Hurdle (2017)
- Last updated on 29 November 2019

Jezki (foaled 8 March 2008) is an Irish Thoroughbred racehorse who competes in National Hunt racing. After showing promise in National Hunt Flat races he won five times as a novice hurdler in the 2012/2013 season, with his victories including the Fishery Lane Hurdle, Royal Bond Novice Hurdle, Future Champions Novice Hurdle and Evening Herald Champion Novice Hurdle. In the following season he won the WKD Hurdle and the Hatton's Grace Hurdle before taking the 2014 Champion Hurdle at Cheltenham Racecourse and following up with a win in the Racing Post Champion Hurdle. In the following season he was beaten in his first three races by Hurricane Fly and finished fourth to Faugheen in the Champion Hurdle before winning the Aintree Hurdle over two and a half miles and defeating Hurricane Fly in the World Series Hurdle.

== Background ==
Jezki is a bay horse with a white star and snip bred in Ireland by Gerard M. McGrath. He is one of the best horses sired by Milan who won the St Leger Stakes and finished second in the Breeders' Cup Turf in 2001. His other progeny include Darlan, who won the Christmas Hurdle in 2012, but was killed in his next race. Jezki' dam La Noire had previously produced Jered, who won the Evening Herald Champion Novice Hurdle in 2008.

During his racing career, Jezki has been owned by J. P. McManus and trained at Moone, County Kildare by Jessica Harrington.

== Racing career ==
=== 2011/2012 National Hunt season: National Hunt Flat races ===
Jezki began his racing career in National Hunt Flat races beginning with an event restricted to four-year-olds at Leopardstown Racecourse on 28 January 2012. Starting at odds of 4/1 he took the lead in the closing stages and won by three quarters of a length from Ned Buntine. He followed up at the same course on 4 March, beating The Big Easy by two lengths and was then sent to England to contest the Grade I Champion Bumper at the Cheltenham Festival ten days later. Ridden by Robbie Power he started at 12/1 and finished eighth of the twenty runner behind Champagne Fever.

=== 2012/2013 National Hunt season: Novice hurdle races ===
In the 2012/2013 season Jezki was mainly campaigned in novice hurdle races. He prepared for the National Hunt season by finishing fifth in a flat race at Navan Racecourse on 10 October. Ridden for the first time by Barry Geraghty, he made his debut over obstacles at Naas Racecourse on 29 October and prevailed by three quarters of a length from the odds-on favourite Ally Cascade. Twelve days later at the same course he won the Grade III Fishery Lane Hurdle, beating seven opponents at odds of 13/8. The gelding was then moved up in class for the Grade I Royal Bond Novice Hurdle at Fairyhouse in December in which he was matched against Champagne Fever for the second time. He was retrained by Geraghty in the early stages before overtaking Champagne Fever at the last hurdle and winning by one and a half lengths. At the end of the month, Jezki, ridden by Robbie Power, started 11/8 favourite for the Grade I Future Champion Novice Hurdle at Punchestown Racecourse and won easily by six lengths from the Dermot Weld-trained Waaheb.

Jezki made his second appearance at the Cheltenham Festival in March 2013 when he started 5/1 second favourite for the Supreme Novices' Hurdle. He appeared to be making progress when he made a mistake at the last hurdle and finished third behind Champagne Fever and My Tent Or Yours. Jezki and Champagne Fever met for the fourth time in the Herald Champion Novice Hurdle at the Punchestown Festival on 23 April. Starting the 2/1 second favourite he overtook his main rival early in the straight and went clear of the field approaching the last, winning by sixteen lengths from Ted Veale, with Champagne Fever in third place.

=== 2013/2014 National Hunt season ===
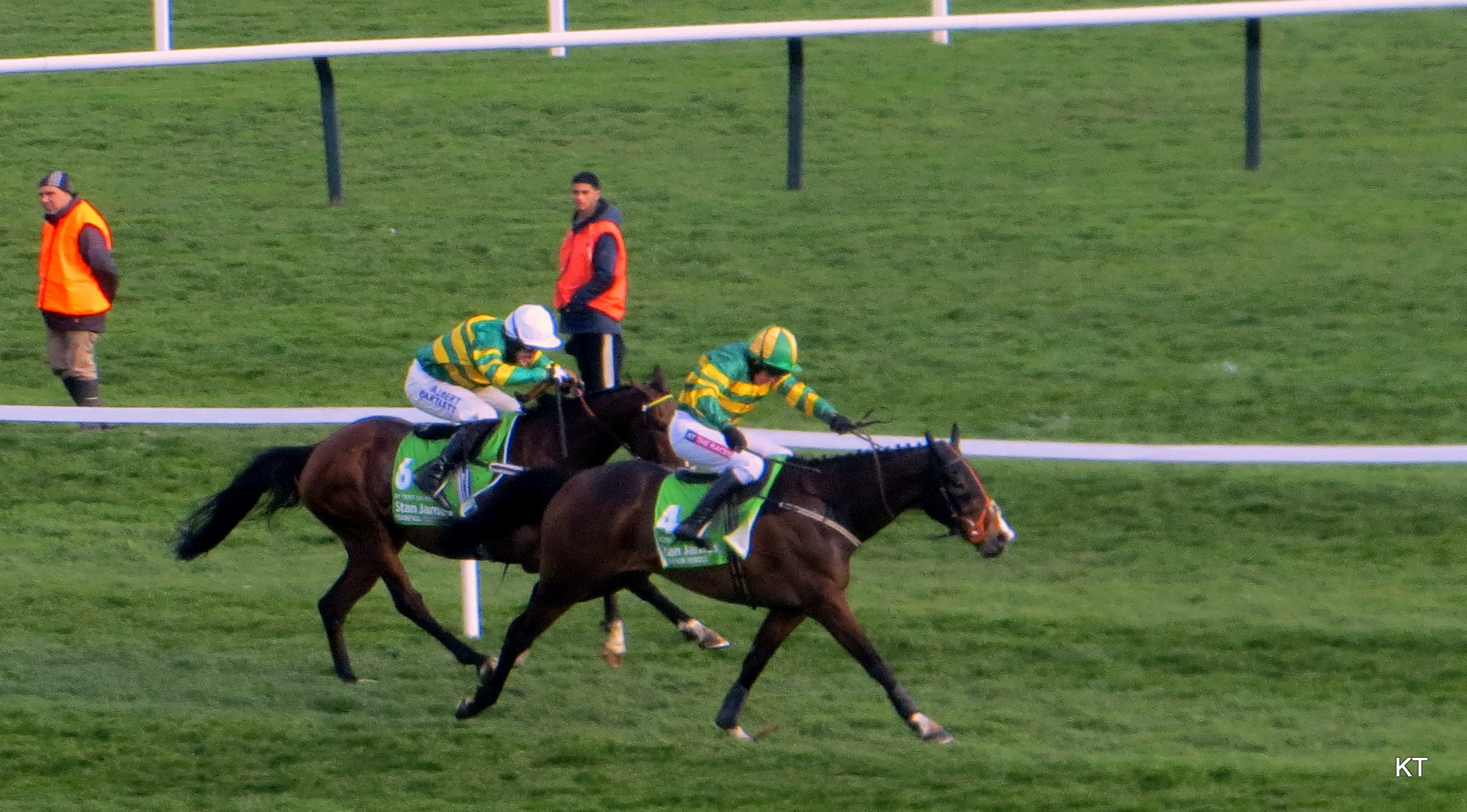
Jezki (right) wins the Champion Hurdle from My Tent Or Yours.

A. P. McCoy took over as Jezki's regular jockey for the 2013/2014 season. The gelding began his third season in the WKD Hurdle, a Grade II handicap race at Down Royal and won "comfortably" under top weight of 164 pounds. Jezki was then stepped up in distance for the Grade I Hatton's Grace Hurdle over two and a half miles at Fairyhouse on 1 December. Starting the 4/6 favourite, he took the lead after the second to last hurdle and won by one and three quarter lengths from the Willie Mullins-trained Zaidpour. On 29 December, Jezki was matched against the reigning Champion Hurdler Hurricane Fly and the Triumph Hurdle winner Our Conor in the Ryanair Hurdle over two miles at Leopardstown. He finished second of the five runners, two and a half lengths behind Hurricane Fly. In the Irish Champion Hurdle over the same course and distance, he finished last of the four runners behind Hurricane Fly, Our Conor and Captain Cee Bee.

In the Champion Hurdle at Cheltenham, Jezki was ridden by Geraghty as McCoy had opted to ride the Nicky Henderson-trained My Tent Or Yours who was also owned by J P McManus. Wearing a hood for the first time he started the 9/1 fifth choice in the betting behind Hurricane Fly, My Tent Or Yours The New One and Our Conor. All nine of the runners were previous Grade I winners. Geraghty tracked the leaders before sending Jezki up to take the lead from the pacemaker Captain Cee Bee at the second last. He first repelled a challenge from Hurricane Fly and then held off the late run of My Tent Or Yours to claim the championship by a neck. The New One finished strongly to take third, two and a half lengths further back. Only Hurricane Fly and the outsider Steps To Freedom appeared to oppose Jezki when he started 4/5 favourite for the Racing Post Champion Hurdle at Punchestown on 2 May. Ridden by McCoy, he took the lead from the start and held off a challenge from Hurricane Fly at the last hurdle to win by three and three-quarter lengths.

=== 2014/2015 National Hunt season ===
Jezki began the new season in the Morgiana Hurdle at Punchestown on 29 November in which he was matched against Hurricane Fly and the improving mare Little King Robin. He raced in second behind the mare before taking the lead at the second last but was then overtaken by Hurricane Fly. He made a mistake at the last and finished second, beaten two and a half lengths by Hurricane Fly. Jezki met Hurricane Fly again in the Ryanair Hurdle at Leopardstown in December. He took the lead in the straight but was overtaken by his rival on the run in and beaten half a length. The Irish Champion Hurdle in January saw yet another meeting between Jezki and Hurricane Fly, with the pair starting at odds of 5/4 and 11/8 respectively. Jezki took the lead at the second lead but made bad mistake at the final hurdle and finished third behind Hurricane Fly and Arctic Fire.

On 10 March at the 2015 Cheltenham Festival, Jezki attempted to repeat his 2014 success in the Champion Hurdle. His seven opponents included Hurricane Fly, The New One and the previously undefeated Faugheen. Starting the 6/1 third choice in the betting he moved up into second place behind Faugheen three hurdles from the finish but was hampered when the leader made a jumping error. He kept on in the closing stages without ever looking likely to win and finished fourth of the eight runners behind Faugheen, Arctic Fire and Hurricane Fly, beaten more than eight lengths by the winner. On 9 April was matched against Arctic Fire and the 2012 Champion Hurdler Rock On Ruby in the Aintree Hurdle over two and a half miles. He was held up by McCoy before moving up into second place behind Arctic Fire approaching the last. When Arctic Fire fell at the final hurdle, Jezki was left with a clear lead and won by thirteen lengths from Rock On Ruby, being eased down by McCoy in the closing stages. Harrington commented "It's great to get him back in the winner's enclosure. They've been hard races all season and he's been on the go for a long time but he was very tough today". Three weeks later he was moved up to three miles for the World Series Hurdle at Punchestown for which he started 5/2 second favourite behind Hurricane Fly. With Mark Walsh taking over from the recently retired McCoy he was restrained in the early stages before moving into fourth at the eleventh of the fourteen hurdles. He took the lead approaching the last and stayed on to win by one and three quarter lengths from Hurricane Fly with a gap of eight lengths back to Zabana in third.

In September 2015 it was announced that Jezki had sustained a leg injury and would probably miss the whole of the 2015/2016 National Hunt season.

== Pedigree ==
Pedigree of Jezki (IRE), bay gelding, 2008
Sire Milan (IRE) 1998	Sadler's Wells (USA); 1981	Northern Dancer	Nearctic
Sire Milan (IRE) 1998	Sadler's Wells (USA); 1981	Northern Dancer	Natalma
Sire Milan (IRE) 1998	Sadler's Wells (USA); 1981	Fairy Bridge	Bold Reason
Sire Milan (IRE) 1998	Sadler's Wells (USA); 1981	Fairy Bridge	Special
Sire Milan (IRE) 1998	Kithanga (IRE); 1990	Darshaan	Shirley Heights
Sire Milan (IRE) 1998	Kithanga (IRE); 1990	Darshaan	Delsy
Sire Milan (IRE) 1998	Kithanga (IRE); 1990	Kalata	Assert
Sire Milan (IRE) 1998	Kithanga (IRE); 1990	Kalata	Kalkeen
Dam La Noire (IRE) 1995	Phardante (FR); 1982	Pharly	Lyphard
Dam La Noire (IRE) 1995	Phardante (FR); 1982	Pharly	Comely
Dam La Noire (IRE) 1995	Phardante (FR); 1982	Pallante	Taj Dewan
Dam La Noire (IRE) 1995	Phardante (FR); 1982	Pallante	Cavadonga
Dam La Noire (IRE) 1995	Arctic Run (IRE); 1985	Deep Run	Pampered King
Dam La Noire (IRE) 1995	Arctic Run (IRE); 1985	Deep Run	Trial By Fire
Dam La Noire (IRE) 1995	Arctic Run (IRE); 1985	Arctic Rhapsody	Bargello
Dam La Noire (IRE) 1995	Arctic Run (IRE); 1985	Arctic Rhapsody	Arctic Blaze (Family 3)
