= Jezki Hurdle =

Hurdle horse race in Ireland

WKD Hurdle
2026
Heads Up	Blake	Gameball

Previous years
2025
Casheldale Lad	Royal Hollow	Eye Of A Tiger
2024
Brighterdaysahead	King Of Kingsfield	Daddy Long Legs
2023
Irish Point	Magical Zoe	Media Naranja
2022
Pied Piper	David Garrick	Gaelic Arc
2021
Zanahiyr	Cask Mate	Bonarc

2020-2011
2019
Coeur Sublime	Coko Beach	Triplicate
2018
Bedrock	Samcro	Sharjah
2017
Melon	Coquin Mans	Mick Jazz
2016
Rashaan	Apple's Jade	Petit Mouchoir
2015
Identity Thief	Whiteout	Modem
2014
Little King Robin	Arctic Fire	Orgilgo Bay
2013
Jezki	Caid Du Berlais	Flaxen Flare
2012
Monksland	Joxer	One Cool Shabra
2011
The Real Article	Kalann	Oscars Well

2010-2001
2010
Gimli's Rock	Der Spieler	Summit Meeting
2009
Voler La Vedette	Go Native	Luska Lad
2008
Jered	Cork All Star	Whatuthink
2007
Aitmatov	Farmer Brown	Salford City
2006
Iktitaf	Davenport Democrat	Sauterelle
2005
Feathard Lady	Sky's The Limit	Royal Paradise
2004
Macs Joy	Brave Inca	Barrack Buster
2003
Khetaam	Mutakarrim	Only 2 finished
2002
Scottish Memories	Turtleback	Risky Reef
2001
Ned Kelly	Joe Cullen	Theseus

The Jezki Hurdle, currently run as the Bottlegreen Hurdle, is a Grade 3 National Hunt hurdle race in Ireland which is open to horses aged four years or older. It is run at Down Royal over a distance of about 2 miles and half a furlong (2 miles and 100 yards, or 3,310 metres), and it is scheduled to take place each year in late October or early November.

The race was first run in 2001. It was awarded Grade 3 status in 2006 and further raised to Grade 2 status in 2010 but was downgraded to Grade 3 status in 2023. The race was previously run as the Anglo Irish Bank Hurdle and WKD Hurdle.

== Records ==
Leading jockey since 2001 (5 wins):

- Paul Carberry – Scottish Memories (2002), Khetaam (2003), Iktitaf (2006), Aitmatov (2007), Monksland (2012)

Leading trainer since 2001 (6 wins):

- Noel Meade – Scottish Memories (2002), Khetaam (2003), Iktitaf (2006), Aitmatov (2007), Jered (2008), Monksland (2012)
- Gordon Elliott - Couer Sublime (2019), Zanahiyr (2021), Pied Piper (2022), Irish Point (2023), Brighterdaysahead (2024), Casheldale Lad (2025)

== Winners ==
Year	Winner	Age	Jockey	Trainer
2001	Ned Kelly	5	Norman Williamson	Edward O'Grady
2002	Scottish Memories	6	Paul Carberry	Noel Meade
2003	Khetaam	5	Paul Carberry	Noel Meade
2004	Macs Joy	5	Barry Geraghty	Jessica Harrington
2005	Feathard Lady	5	Ruby Walsh	Colm Murphy
2006	Iktitaf	5	Paul Carberry	Noel Meade
2007	Aitmatov	6	Paul Carberry	Noel Meade
2008	Jered	6	Tony McCoy	Noel Meade
2009	Voler La Vedette	5	Barry Geraghty	Colm Murphy
2010	Gimli's Rock	4	Tommy Treacy	Jessica Harrington
2011	The Real Article	6	Barry Geraghty	Edward O'Grady
2012	Monksland	5	Paul Carberry	Noel Meade
2013	Jezki	5	Tony McCoy	Jessica Harrington
2014	Little King Robin	6	Mark Walsh	Colin Bowe
2015	Identity Thief	5	Bryan Cooper	Henry de Bromhead
2016	Rashaan	4	Sean Flanagan	Colin Kidd
2017	Melon	5	Ruby Walsh	Willie Mullins
2018	Bedrock	5	Rachael Blackmore	Iain Jardine
2019	Couer Sublime	4	Davy Russell	Gordon Elliott
2020	Aspire Tower	4	Rachael Blackmore	Henry De Bromhead
2021	Zanahiyr	4	Jack Kennedy	Gordon Elliott
2022	Pied Piper	4	Jack Kennedy	Gordon Elliott
2023	Irish Point	5	Jack Kennedy	Gordon Elliott
2024	Brighterdaysahead	5	Sam Ewing	Gordon Elliott
2025	Casheldale Lad	5	Jack Kennedy	Gordon Elliott
2026	Heads Up	6	Danny Mullins	John C McConnell

== See also ==
- Horse racing in Ireland
- List of Irish National Hunt races
