= My Tent Or Yours =

Irish-bred Thoroughbred racehorse

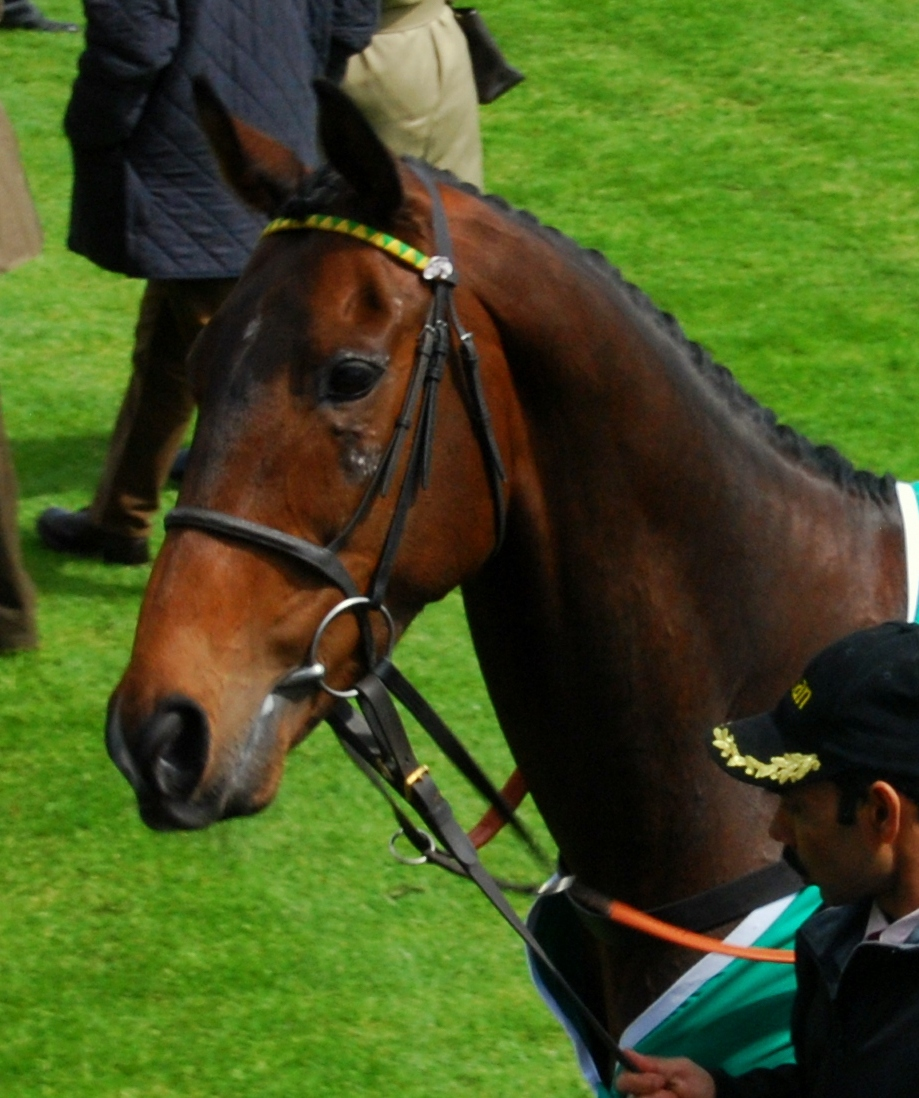
- My Tent Or Yours at Sandown in April 2014.
- Sire: Desert Prince
- Grandsire: Green Desert
- Dam: Spartan Girl
- Damsire: Ela-Mana-Mou
- Sex: Gelding
- Foaled: 16 March 2007
- Country: Ireland
- Colour: Bay
- Breeder: Frank Dunne
- Owner: The Happy Campers; J. P. McManus
- Trainer: Nicky Henderson
- Record: 24:9-11-3
- Earnings: £826,336

Major wins
- Betfair Hurdle (2013); Top Novices' Hurdle (2013); Fighting Fifth Hurdle (2013); Christmas Hurdle (2013); International Hurdle (2017)
- Last updated on 3 May 2017

My Tent Or Yours (foaled 16 March 2007) is an Irish-bred, British-trained Thoroughbred racehorse who competes in National Hunt racing and has finished second in three editions of the Champion Hurdle. In his first season, he showed promising form in National Hunt Flat races, winning on his debut and finishing second in the Champion Standard Open NH Flat Race. In the following year he was one of the best novice hurdlers in the British Isles, winning the Betfair Hurdle against more experienced rivals and the Top Novices' Hurdle at Aintree. In the 2013/2014 National Hunt season he won the Fighting Fifth Hurdle and the Christmas Hurdle and finished runner-up in the Champion Hurdle. His later career was interrupted by injury but he returned to finish second in the Champion Hurdle in 2016 and 2017. In December 2017 he returned to Cheltenham to win the International Hurdle on his seasonal debut after a protracted battle with The New One. On 9 December 2018 it was announced that My Tent Or Yours was retiring to JP McManus's Martinstown Stud.

== Background ==
My Tent Or Yours is a bay gelding bred in Ireland by Frank Dunne. He was sired by Desert Prince, one of the best European-trained colts of his generation who won the Irish 2,000 Guineas, Prix du Moulin and Queen Elizabeth II Stakes in 1998. He has not been a particularly successful breeding stallion, but has sired the Scottish Derby winner Oriental Magic. His dam Spartan Girl won one minor race and came from a very well-regarded family, being a half-sister of Conduit and a close relative of Petrushka, Spectrum and Millenary.

As a foal in November 2007 My Tent Or Yours was consigned by the Irish National Stud to the Goffs sale where he was sold for €2,000 to Tiger Bloodstock. In May 2010, My Tent Or Yours, still an entire colt, was offered for sale at the Doncaster Spring Stores sale and was bought for £12,000 by a partnership of Highflyer Bloodstock and the trainer Nicky Henderson. He subsequently entered the ownership of The Happy Campers syndicate and was trained by Henderson at Upper Lambourn in Berkshire.

== Racing career ==
=== 2011/2012 National Hunt season: National Hunt Flat races ===
My Tent Or Yours began his racing career in National Hunt Flat races, also known as "bumpers", beginning at Ludlow Racecourse on 21 December 2011. Ridden by A. P. McCoy, he started 10/11 favourite and took the lead approaching the final furlong and won very easily by nine lengths from Rainbow Haze. Barry Geraghty took over the ride when My Tent Or Yours started 8/11 favourite for a bumper at Newbury Racecourse on 3 March. He finished strongly but failed by a neck to catch Up To Something. On his final appearance of the season, the gelding was moved up in class for the Grade II Champion Standard Open NH Flat Race at Aintree Racecourse in April. Starting at odds of 5/1, he took the lead approaching the final furlong but was overtaken in the closing stages and beaten by the four-year-old The New One, to whom he was conceding six pounds.

At the end of the season, My Tent Or Yours was bought privately by J. P. McManus.

=== 2012/2013 National Hunt season: Novice hurdles ===
In the following season My Tent Or Yours competed mainly in novice hurdle races. He made his debut over obstacles at Ascot Racecourse in November, when he was ridden by McCoy and started 4/7 favourite against five opponents. He was restrained in the early stages before taking the lead at the last hurdle and won by one and three quarter lengths from the French-bred Taquin Du Seuil who went on tho win the Grade I Challow Novices' Hurdle a month later. On 29 December he started 4/7 favourite for a minor novice event at Newbury but was never able to reach the lead, and was beaten four and a half lengths by his stable companion Chatterbox. Two weeks later the gelding returned to winning form at Huntingdon Racecourse, starting 4/7 favourite against twelve opponents and winning by seven lengths from Population despite being eased down by McCoy in the closing stages.

On 9 February at Newbury, was matched against more experienced hurdlers in the Grade III Betfair Hurdle at Newbury. Ridden as usual by McCoy, he started the 5/1 joint-favourite in a field of twenty-one runners, despite carrying a weight of 156 pounds. He was always travelling well before taking the lead after the second last hurdle and going clear of the field to win impressively by five lengths from Cotton Mill. His win came five days after the stable's leading hurdler Darlan had been killed in a fall at Doncaster. Henderson said that the winner was "terribly keen... a stronger pace would have helped. He has gears and can quicken up". McCoy commented "that was a very good performance off a high mark for a novice on testing ground. He takes a keen hold and I thought the ground may catch us out", before adding "I'd rather wait until next season for the Champion Hurdle".

My Tent Or Yours was sent to the Cheltenham Festival for the first time when he contested the Grade I Supreme Novices' Hurdle on 12 March. He was made the 15/8 favourite against eleven rivals, including Champagne Fever and Cheltenian, the last two winners of the Champion Bumper as well as Jezki, who had defeated Champagne Fever in the Royal Bond Novice Hurdle. My Tent Or Yours tracked the leader before taking a narrow lead at the last but was overtaken by the rallying Champagne Fever on the run-in and beaten half a length into second place. Only three horses, including the Dovecote Novices' Hurdle winner Forgotten Voice, appeared to oppose My Tent Or Yours in the Top Novices' Hurdle at Aintree in April. Starting the 4/11 favourite, he took the lead three hurdles from the finish and went clear of his rival to win very easily by sixteen lengths. After the race, Henderson commented "When you've had a hard race at Cheltenham it's nice to just come back and get confidence and go to bed for the summer happy and relieved. We know he's good. He's got to be in the ‘contenders' bracket for next year's Champion Hurdle. He's becoming very professional. That is what this season has been all about".

=== 2013/2014 National Hunt season ===
My Tent Or Yours began his third season in the Grade I Fighting Fifth Hurdle at Newcastle Racecourse on 30 November and started 8/11 favourite ahead of Melodic Rendezvous who had won the Elite Hurdle three weeks earlier. The gelding fought against McCoy' attempts to restrain him in the early stages, but moved into the lead two hurdles out and won by three lengths from the mare Cockney Sparrow. McCoy described the victory as "a good performance, a good starting point" but pointed out that the gelding was much the best horse in the race on previous form and was expected to win easily. On 26 December at Kempton Park Racecourse My Tent Or Yours faced The New One in a race for the Grade I Christmas Hurdle. Since beating My Tent Or Yours at Aintree in 2012, The New One had won six races including the Baring Bingham Novices' Hurdle and the International Hurdle and was favoured in the betting at 5/6 while My Tent Or Yours starting at 11/8 in a field of six. My Tent Or Yours was restrained by McCoy in the early stages and survived a mistake at the fifth hurdle before moving up into second place behind The New One before the second last. The two leading contenders drew away from the other runners in the straight with My Tent Or Yours gaining the advantage in the last 100 yards to win by half a length after what Daily Telegraph described as "the best hurdle race run in England or Ireland this season".

My Tent Or Yours prepared for the 2014 Champion Hurdle with a run in a two-mile flat race on the Polytrack surface at Kempton on 19 February. He took the lead a quarter of a mile from the finish and won easily by four and a half lengths from Ranjaan and ten others. On 11 March, My Tent Or Yours, ridden by McCoy, started 3/1 second favourite behind Hurricane Fly for the 2014 Champion Hurdle. He tracked the leaders for most of the race before producing a strong late run but failed by a neck to catch Jezki. The New One and Hurricane Fly finished third and fourth respectively. The gelding ended his season in the Scottish Champion Hurdle (a handicap race) at Ayr Racecourse on 12 April. He started favourite, but after taking the lead two hurdles out he was overtaken in the closing stages and finished third behind Cockney Sparrow and Court Minstrel, to whom he was conceding six and sixteen pounds respectively.

In October 2014 it was announced that My Tent Or Yours had undergone surgery for a tendon injury and would miss the whole of the 2014/2015 National Hunt season. Henderson said "It's very frustrating for everyone involved" but added that "there is no reason why he should not come back as good as ever next season".

=== 2015/16 National Hunt season ===
My Tent Or Yours came second to Annie Power by four and a half lengths in the 2016 Champion Hurdle after a 703-day absence. He done this while conceding a seven pounds Mares allowance. In the Aintree Hurdle My Tent Or Yours again came second to Annie Power this time by 18 lengths. In his last race of the season My Tent Or Yours came third in the Punchestown Champion Hurdle behind winner Vroum Vroum Mag and second place Identify Thief.

=== 2016/17 National Hunt season ===
On My Tent Or Yours first start of the season he was third of four runners at haydock. On his next start he was second to The New One by three and a half lengths in the International Hurdle. In his third race of the season My Tent Or Yours was fourth in the Christmas Hurdle, a race won by Yanworth. In the 2017 Champion Hurdle My Tent Or Yours was second to Buveur d'Air by four and a half lengths. In the Aintree Hurdle he was second to Buveur d'Air by five lengths. In his last race of the season My Tent Or Yours came second to Wicklow Brave by one and a half lengths in the Punchestown Champion Hurdle.

== Pedigree ==
Pedigree of My Tent Or Yours (IRE), bay gelding 2007
Sire Desert Prince (IRE) 1995	Green Desert (USA); 1983	Danzig	Northern Dancer
Sire Desert Prince (IRE) 1995	Green Desert (USA); 1983	Danzig	Pas de Nom
Sire Desert Prince (IRE) 1995	Green Desert (USA); 1983	Foreign Courier	Sir Ivor
Sire Desert Prince (IRE) 1995	Green Desert (USA); 1983	Foreign Courier	Courtly Dee
Sire Desert Prince (IRE) 1995	Flying Fairy (GB); 1983	Bustino	Busted
Sire Desert Prince (IRE) 1995	Flying Fairy (GB); 1983	Bustino	Ship Yard
Sire Desert Prince (IRE) 1995	Flying Fairy (GB); 1983	Fairy Footsteps	Mill Reef
Sire Desert Prince (IRE) 1995	Flying Fairy (GB); 1983	Fairy Footsteps	Glass Slipper
Dam Spartan Girl (IRE) 1994	Ela-Mana-Mou (IRE); 1976	Pitcairn	Petingo
Dam Spartan Girl (IRE) 1994	Ela-Mana-Mou (IRE); 1976	Pitcairn	Border Bounty
Dam Spartan Girl (IRE) 1994	Ela-Mana-Mou (IRE); 1976	Rose Bertin	High Hat
Dam Spartan Girl (IRE) 1994	Ela-Mana-Mou (IRE); 1976	Rose Bertin	Wide Awake
Dam Spartan Girl (IRE) 1994	Well Head (IRE); 1989	Sadler's Wells	Northern Dancer
Dam Spartan Girl (IRE) 1994	Well Head (IRE); 1989	Sadler's Wells	Fairy Bridge
Dam Spartan Girl (IRE) 1994	Well Head (IRE); 1989	River Dancer	Irish River
Dam Spartan Girl (IRE) 1994	Well Head (IRE); 1989	River Dancer	Dancing Shadow (Family: 1-l)

- My Tent Or Yours is inbred 4 x 4 to Northern Dancer, meaning that this stallion appears twice in the fourth generation of his pedigree.
