= Detroit City (horse) =

American-bred Thoroughbred racehorse

- Sire: Kingmambo
- Dam: Seattle Victory
- Damsire: Seattle Song
- Sex: Gelding
- Foaled: 5 April 2002
- Country: United States
- Colour: Grey
- Breeder: Edward J Kelly
- Owner: Terry Warner
- Trainer: Philip Hobbs
- Record: 20: 12-1-0
- Earnings: £420,035

Major wins
- Triumph Hurdle (2006); Anniversary 4-Y-O Novices' Hurdle (2006); Cesarewitch (2006); Greatwood Handicap Hurdle (2006); Boylesports.com International Hurdle (2006); Agfa Hurdle

Detroit City (5 April 2002 – 24 November 2007) was a thoroughbred racehorse, most famous as a two mile hurdler. He won five Class 1 races including the 2006 Triumph Hurdle, he also had success on the flat in the Cesarewitch Handicap. The grey died in November 2007, aged five, following a fall at Ascot. He was trained by Jeremy Noseda until his hurdling career began when Philip Hobbs took over. Six of his seven wins over hurdles came with Richard Johnson as jockey.

== Racing career ==
=== Flat ===
Detroit City's racing career began in 2005 on all weather. He made his debut in January 2005, finishing ninth in a one-mile two furlongs maiden. A month later, he won a one mile four furlongs maiden at Wolverhampton and followed this with two handicap wins over the same distance. In May, he returned to turf and finished fifth and sixth in his first two runs. He won a one mile six furlongs handicap at Nottingham in June and was then entered in Bahrain Trophy, where he finished second.

After his first season of hurdling, he returned to the flat in October 2006 for the Cesarewitch. In a field of 31, he won by a length from Inchnadamph.

=== Hurdles ===
Detroit City made his hurdling debut in December 2005 in a juvenile novices hurdle at Warwick. Following an eighth place in that race, he went on a succession of wins. He won two juveniles over two miles one furlong before travelling to the Cheltenham Festival for the Triumph Hurdle. At odds of 7/2, he went into the race as favourite and the bookmakers were proved correct, he outstayed stablemate Fair Along to win by five lengths. He concluded the season with the Anniversary 4-Y-O Novices' Hurdle at Aintree, he won by eight lengths becoming the first horse since Pollardstown in 1979 to complete Triumph Hurdle/Aintree Hurdle double.

After the Cesarewitch success, Detroit City switched back to hurdles again with a run at Cheltenham in the Greatwood Handicap Hurdle. With no pacemakers, he set the pace himself and despite carrying top weight won by 14 lengths; the Racing Post described it as a "stunning performance". Following the race he was made favourite for the Champion Hurdle. He returned to Cheltenham a month later for the Boylesports.com International Hurdle and won, beating Hardy Eustace by a length. The success in a field of four failed to impress the Racing Post, who said he still had "plenty to prove" to justify being favourite for the Champion Hurdle.

Detroit's preparation run before the Champion Hurdle came in the Agfa Hurdle at Sandown. He won, beating Straw Bear by one and 3/4 lengths. He arrived at Cheltenham on the back of eight consecutive wins but was attempting to defy the poor record of five-year-olds in the Champion Hurdle, 71 horses of that age had tried since the last five-year-old winner, See You Then in 1985. He began the race as 6/4 favourite but struggled from the beginning, eventually finishing sixth of the ten runners. Racing Post noted it was a "huge disappointment". He ended the season with a run in the Aintree Hurdle but finished tenth out of ten finishers.

Over the summer of 2007, Detroit City had a wind operation; a back problem and stomach ulcers were also treated. He began the 2007/08 season with the Ascot Hurdle, moving up in trip to two miles and four furlongs. After he jumped the second fence, his back end collapsed. Jockey Richard Johnson held his head down as he thought the horse may have broken a leg on landing, but it was later revealed that a heart problem was the cause. Detroit City died on the track in the arms of Johnson. Afterwards, Johnson paid tribute to the horse, calling him "probably the best hurdler I've ridden".
