= Bar One Racing Juvenile Hurdle =

Hurdle horse race in Ireland

Bar One Racing Juvenile 3-Y-O Hurdle
2025
Mange Tout	Narciso Has	Adrienne

Previous years
2024
Naturally Nimble	Willy De Houelle	Messerschmitt
2023
Nurburgring	Kala Conti	Eagle Fang
2022
Lossiemouth	Zarak The Brave	Comfort Zone
2021
Fil Dor	Lunar Power	Feigh

2020-2011
2020
Zanahiyr	Saint Sam	Druid's Altar
2019
Cerberus	A Wave Of The Sea	Tremwedge
2018
Chief Justice	Coeur Sublime	Lever Du Soleil
2017
Espoir D'allen	Mitchouka	Randalls Ur Poet
2016
Landofhopeandglory	Bapaume	Mega Fortune
2015
Rashaan	Missy Tata	Le Vagabond
2014
Kalkir	Dai Bando	Verawal
2013
Analifet	Noble Inn	Clarcam
2012
Our Conor	Stocktons Wing	South South West
2011
Sam Bass	His Excellency	One Cool Shabra

2010-2001
2010
Toner D'Oudairies	Kalann	Fearless Falcon
2009
Cross Appeal	Action Master	Mosstown
2008
Tharawaat	Drunken Sailor	Tilabay
2007
Maca Rince	Paco Jack	Harper Valley
2006
Sophist	Financial Reward	Victoria Night
2005
The Last Stand	Ballygally Bay	Vox Populi
2004
Stromstad	Don't Be Bitin	Riverboatman
2003
Imazulutoo	Top Strategy	You Need Luck
2002
Golden Cross	Mirpour	Dashing Home
2001
Balapour	Well Fella	Baron De Feypo

2000-1994
2000
Francies Fancy	Golden Storm	Summer Break
1999
Fable	Calico Lady	Yeoman's Point
1998
Miss Emer	Golden Rule	Afarad
1997
Rainbow Frontier	Purchasing Power	Global Diamond
1996
Spirit Dancer	Highly Motivated	Greenhue
1995
Theatreworld	Fresh Deal	Just An Illusion
1994
Majestic Man	Dr Leunt	Celibate

The Bar One Racing Juvenile Hurdle is a Grade 3 National Hunt novice hurdle race in Ireland which is open to horses aged three years old. It is run at Fairyhouse over a distance of about 2 miles (3,218 metres), and it is scheduled to take place each year in late November or early December.

The race was established in 1994, and it has held Grade 3 status throughout its history.

== Records ==
Most successful jockey (4 wins):

- Davy Russell - Tharawaat (2008), Toner D'Oudairies (2010), Chief Justice (2018), Fil Dor (2021)

Most successful trainer (6 wins):

- Gordon Elliott - Tharawaat (2008), Toner D'Oudairies (2010), Chief Justice (2018), Zanahiyr (2020), Fil Dor (2021), Mange Tout (2025)

== Winners ==
Year	Winner	Jockey	Trainer
1994	Majestic Man	T J Mitchell	Peter McCreery
1995	Theatreworld	Charlie Swan	Aidan O'Brien
1996	Spirit Dancer	S C Lyons	Ger Lyons
1997	Rainbow Frontier	Tommy Treacy	Aidan O'Brien
1998	Miss Emer	Paul Carberry	Noel Meade
1999	Fable	Paul Carberry	Noel Meade
2000	Francies Fancy	Conor O'Dwyer	Peter Henley
2001	Balapour	J P Elliott	Patrick O Brady
2002	Golden Cross	Charlie Swan	Michael Halford
2003	Imazulutoo	Mark Walsh	Jessica Harrington
2004	Stromstad	J P Elliott	S J Mahon
2005	The Last Stand	M P Watts	Anthony Mullins
2006	Sophist	Philip Enright	John C McConnell
2007	Maca Rince	I J McCarthy	Jarlath P Fahey
2008	Tharawaat	Davy Russell	Gordon Elliott
2009	Cross Appeal	P W Flood	Noel Meade
2010	Toner D'Oudairies	Davy Russell	Gordon Elliott
2011	Sam Bass	Paul Carberry	Noel Meade
2012	Our Conor	Bryan Cooper	Dessie Hughes
2013	Analifet	Ruby Walsh	Willie Mullins
2014	Kalkir	Ruby Walsh	Willie Mullins
2015	Rashaan	Mikey Fogarty	Colin Kidd
2016	Landofhopeandglory	Barry Geraghty	Joseph O'Brien
2017	Espoir d'Allen	Barry Geraghty	Gavin Cromwell
2018	Chief Justice	Davy Russell	Gordon Elliott
2019	Cerberus	Robbie Power	Joseph O'Brien
2020	Zanahiyr	Jack Kennedy	Gordon Elliott
2021	Fil Dor	Davy Russell	Gordon Elliott
2022	Lossiemouth	Danny Mullins	Willie Mullins
2023	Nurburgring	Richard Deegan	Joseph O'Brien
2024	Naturally Nimble	Richard Deegan	Joseph O'Brien
2025	Mange Tout	Jack Kennedy	Gordon Elliott

== See also ==
- Horse racing in Ireland
- List of Irish National Hunt races
