= Contenders Hurdle =

Hurdle horse race in Britain

Contenders Hurdle
2022
Goshen	Guard Your Dreams	Global Citizen

2020-2011
2020
Quel Destin	Call Me Lord	Eldorado Allen
2019
Buveur D'Air	Vision Des Flos	Roksana
2018
Buveur D'Air	John Constable	Cap'n
2017
Buveur D'air	Rayvin Black	Irving
2016
Connetable	Rayvin Black	Peace And Co
2015
Garde La Victoire	Jollyallan	Bristol De Mai
2013
Rock On Ruby	Countrywide Flame	Clerk's Choice
2011
Binocular	Ruthenoise	Siberian Tiger

2010-2001
2010
Binocular	Dee Ee Williams	Marodima
2009
Celestial Halo	Osana	Afsoun
2008
Afsoun	Straw Bear	Osako D'airy
2007
Detroit City	Straw Bear	Whispered Promises
2006
Royal Shakespeare	Alph	Mister McGoldrick
2005
Self Defense	Rooster Booster	Chivalry
2004
Rhinestone Cowboy	Garde Champetre	Teaatral
2003
Rooster Booster	Self Defense	Telimar Prince
2002
Bilboa	Rodock	Teaatral
2001
Teaatral	Bounce Back	Geos

2000-1991
2000
Auetaler	Mr Percy	Master Beveled
1999
Midnight Legend	Master Beveled	Juyush
1998
Master Beveled	Shadow Leader	Marello
1997
Double Symphony	Chief's Song	Ground Nut
1996
Atours	Land Afar	Telasco
1995
Land Afar	Absalom's Lady	Bokaro
1994
Muse	Valfinet	Mole Board
1993
Mole Board	Valfinet	Ruling
1992
Fidway	Oh So Risky	Forest Sun
1991
Voyage Sans Retour	Fidway	Major Inquiry

1990-1988
1989
Aldino	Yaheeb	Chesham Squire
1988
Celtic Chief	Celtic Shot	Pat's Jester

The Contenders Hurdle was a Listed National Hunt hurdle race in Great Britain which was open to horses aged four years or older. It was run at Sandown Park over a distance of about 2 miles (1 mile 7 furlongs and 216 yards, or 3,319 metres), and during its running there were eight hurdles to be jumped. The race took place each year in late January or early February.

The race was first run in 1949 and was originally titled the Oteley Hurdle, and it was contested over a length of 2 miles (3,219 metres). Winners in the 1970s included Lanzarote and Sea Pigeon, and during the 1980s it was won by Desert Orchid and See You Then.

From the early 1990s until 2007 the race was sponsored by Agfa, and it was known as the Agfa Hurdle. In 1993 its distance was extended by 110 yards (about 100 metres) to the current length. It was most recently sponsored by Betfred. The 2008 running was classed at Grade 2 level, but the event was reverted to its former Listed status in 2009. Prior to 2010 it was open to horses aged five and over. The race often served as a trial for the Champion Hurdle, and the last horse to win both events in the same year was Buveur d'Air in 2017 and 2018.

The race was discontinued in 2023. Nicky Henderson who had won six of the last twelve runnings lamented the fact that it would be no longer an option for preparing his intended Champion Hurdle candidates saying "I had my favourite race at Sandown, it was worth nothing, but was perfect timing - but not surprisingly, it only had three or four runners (every year) and they've done away with it." In April 2023 the British Horseracing Authority confirmed that the race had been removed from the jumps pattern programme in the 2022–23 season.

== Winners ==
- Amateur jockeys indicated by "Mr".

Year	Winner	Age	Jockey	Trainer
1949	National Spirit	8	Bryan Marshall	Vic Smyth
1950	National Spirit	9	Dennis Dillon	Vic Smyth
1951	Abandoned because of waterlogged state of course
1952	Telegram II	5	Dave Dick	Fulke Walwyn
1953	Abandoned because of snow
1954	Fastnet Rock	7	Arthur Freeman	C Jellis
1955	Abandoned because of snow
1956	Abandoned because of frost
1957	Vermillion	9	Fred Winter	Ryan Price
1958	Retour de Flamme	5	Jimmy Lindley	S Warren
1959	Fare Time	6	Fred Winter	Ryan Price
1960	Fare Time	7	Fred Winter	Ryan Price
1961	Eborneezer	6	Fred Winter	Ryan Price
1962	Snuff Box	5	Johnnie Gilbert	John Benstead
1963	Abandoned because of snow and frost
1964	Kirriemuir	4	David Mould	Fulke Walwyn
1965	Magic Court	7	Pat McCarron	T Robson
1966	Abandoned because of waterlogged state of course
1967	Chenonceaux	6	Des Briscoe	Ken Cundell
1968	Into View	5	E P Harty	Fred Winter
1969	Abandoned because of snow
1970	Major Rose	8	Josh Gifford	Ryan Price
1971	Major Rose	9	Paul Kelleway	Ryan Price
1972	Phaestus	6	Ken White	Fred Rimell
1973	Lanzarote	5	Richard Pitman	Fred Winter
1974	Lanzarote	6	Richard Pitman	Fred Winter
1975	Abandoned because of waterlogged state of course
1976	Sea Pigeon	6	Jonjo O'Neill	Gordon W. Richards
1977	Bird's Nest	7	Andy Turnell	Bob Turnell
1978	Sea Pigeon	8	Jonjo O'Neill	Peter Easterby
1979	Abandoned because of frost
1980	Pollardstown	5	Philip Blacker	Stan Mellor
1981	Celtic Ryde	6	John Francome	Peter Cundell
1982	Heighlin^{[1]}	6	Steve Jobar	David Elsworth
1983	Cima	5	Sam Morshead	Jim Old
1984	Sula Bula	6	Mr Tim Easterby	Peter Easterby
1985	Desert Orchid	6	Colin Brown	David Elsworth
1986	See You Then	6	Steve Smith Eccles	Nicky Henderson
1987	Prideaux Boy	9	Michael Bowlby	Graham Roach
1988	Celtic Chief	5	Richard Dunwoody	Mercy Rimell
1989	Aldino	6	Simon Sherwood	Oliver Sherwood
	no race 1990 ^{[2]}
1991	Voyage Sans Retour	6	Peter Scudamore	Martin Pipe
1992	Fidway	7	Peter Scudamore	Tim Thomson Jones
1993	Mole Board	11	Carl Llewellyn	Jim Old
1994	Muse	7	Paul Holley	David Elsworth
1995	Land Afar	8	Graham McCourt	John Webber
1996	Atours	8	Richard Dunwoody	David Elsworth
1997	Double Symphony	9	Jamie Osborne	Charlie Brooks
1998	Master Beveled	8	Tony McCoy	David Evans
1999	Midnight Legend	8	Richard Johnson	David Nicholson
2000	Auetaler	6	Tony McCoy	Martin Pipe
2001	Teaatral	7	Norman Williamson	Charles Egerton
2002	Bilboa	5	Thierry Doumen	François Doumen
2003	Rooster Booster	9	Richard Johnson	Philip Hobbs
2004	Rhinestone Cowboy	8	Mr J. P. Magnier	Jonjo O'Neill
2005	Self Defense	8	Robert Thornton	Patrick Chamings
2006	Royal Shakespeare	7	Tom Scudamore	Steve Gollings
2007	Detroit City	5	Richard Johnson	Philip Hobbs
2008	Afsoun	6	Mick Fitzgerald	Nicky Henderson
2009	Celestial Halo	5	Ruby Walsh	Paul Nicholls
2010	Binocular	6	Tony McCoy	Nicky Henderson
2011	Binocular	7	Tony McCoy	Nicky Henderson
	no race 2012 ^{[3]}
2013	Rock On Ruby^{[4]}	8	Noel Fehily	Harry Fry
	no race 2014 ^{[5]}
2015	Garde La Victoire	6	Richard Johnson	Philip Hobbs
2016	Connetable	4	Sam Twiston-Davies	Paul Nicholls
2017	Buveur d'Air	6	Barry Geraghty	Nicky Henderson
2018	Buveur d'Air	7	Barry Geraghty	Nicky Henderson
2019	Buveur d'Air	8	Barry Geraghty	Nicky Henderson
2020	Quel Destin	5	Harry Cobden	Paul Nicholls
	no race 2021 ^{[6]}
2022	Goshen	6	Jamie Moore	Gary Moore

^{1} The 1982 race was run at Kempton.
^{2} The 1990 running was abandoned because of waterlogging.
^{3} The 2012 running was abandoned due to frost.
^{4} The 2013 race was run at Doncaster after the original meeting at Sandown became chase only due to the waterlogged state of the hurdle course
^{5} The 2014 running was abandoned due to going conditions.
^{6} The 2021 running was abandoned due to waterlogging and the meeting featured an all chase card instead.

== See also ==
- Horseracing in Great Britain
- List of British National Hunt races
