= Richard Woollacott =

British horse trainer

Richard Woollacott (c. 1977 – 22 January 2018) was a British horse trainer who specialized in training horses competing in National Hunt racing.

Woollacott took up training alongside a successful career as a point-to-point jockey, in which he was British national champion in 2010. He began training in 2008 and trained 60 winners from his stables at South Molton in Devon. His biggest successes came when winning two Grade 2 races in 2017, the Champion Standard Open NH Flat Race with Lalor, and the Long Distance Hurdle at Newbury with Beer Goggles.

Woollacott died by suicide on 22 January 2018 at the age of 40.
