= Darlan (horse) =

British Thoroughbred racehorse

- Sire: Milan
- Grandsire: Sadler's Wells
- Dam: Darbela
- Damsire: Doyoun
- Sex: Gelding
- Foaled: 11 March 2007
- Country: United Kingdom
- Colour: Bay
- Breeder: Martin Kilroe
- Owner: Paul Murphy; J. P. McManus
- Trainer: Nicky Henderson
- Record: 9:6-1-0
- Earnings: £114,669

Major wins
- Top Novices' Hurdle (2012); Christmas Hurdle (2012)

Darlan (11 March 2007 – 4 February 2013) was a British Thoroughbred racehorse who competed in National Hunt racing. In a nine-race career that lasted from April 2011 until February 2013, he won six races, finished second once, and fell twice. After winning his only National Hunt Flat race, he was one of the leading novice hurdlers of the 2011/2012 season, winning four races including the Top Novices' Hurdle. In the following year, he established himself as a leading contender for the Champion Hurdle by winning the Christmas Hurdle, but was killed in a fall in his next race.

== Background ==
Darlan was a bay gelding with a white star, bred by Martin Kilroe. He was one of the best horses sired by Milan, who won the St Leger Stakes and finished second in the Breeders' Cup Turf in 2001. His other progeny include Jezki, and One For Arthur. Darlan's dam Darbela had some success as a racehorse, winning four races and finishing second at Grade II level over hurdles. Darbela was a granddaughter of Darazina, a broodmare whose other descendants included the French classic winners Darjina (Poule d'Essai des Pouliches), Darsi (Prix du Jockey Club) and Daryaba (Prix de Diane).

As a yearling colt, Darlan was sent to the Doncaster sale in January 2008 and was bought for £13,000 by the bloodstock agent David Redvers. He entered the ownership of Paul Murphy and was sent into training with Nicky Henderson at Upper Lambourn in Berkshire.

== Racing career ==
=== 2010/2011 National Hunt season: National Hunt Flat races ===
Darlan began his racing career at the age of four when he contested a National Hunt Flat race over two miles at Haydock Park Racecourse on 23 April 2011. He was ridden by Andrew Tinkler and was made the 4/6 favourite against seven opponents. He took the lead three furlongs from the finish and went clear of the other runner in the closing stages to win by twenty-seven lengths. After this race, Darlan was sold privately to J. P. McManus.

=== 2011/2012 National Hunt season: Novice hurdles ===
In the following season, Darlan competed mainly in novice hurdle races. On 21 November at Kempton Park Racecourse, he was partnered by Barry Geraghty for his first appearance over hurdles and started at odds of 1/4. He took the lead halfway through the race and was never seriously challenged, winning by six lengths from Sleeping City. A. P. McCoy took over the ride when the gelding reappeared at Cheltenham Racecourse in December for a novice hurdle in which he carried six pounds more than his eight opponents. He took the lead approaching the final hurdle, but was strongly challenged throughout the closing by High Storm before prevailing by a short head. Darlan extended his unbeaten run to four at Taunton Racecourse in January, beating the Paul Nicholls-trained Jump City by half a length, with the pair finishing fifteen lengths clear of the other runners. According to Greg Wood, writing in The Guardian, the winning margin was "no measure of Darlan's superiority... as Geraghty was motionless on the winner as Ruby Walsh rode furiously on Jump City without making any impression".

In February, Darlan was matched against more experienced rivals in the Betfair Hurdle, a handicap race in which he carried a weight of 150 pounds and started at odds of 12/1 in a field of twenty runners. He was making progress towards the leaders and appeared to be going well when he fell at the second last hurdle. On 13 March, Darlan made his first and only appearance at the Cheltenham Festival when he contested the Grade I Supreme Novices' Hurdle. He was ridden by McCoy and was made the 7/1 second favourite in the nineteen runner field, behind the Dermot Weld-trained Galileo's Choice, a Group race winner on the flat. He was restrained in the early stages before making progress throughout the second half of the race. He took second place from Trifolium in the final strides, but was unable to catch the Donald McCain-trained Cinders and Ashes, who won by one and a quarter lengths. This was Darlan's only career defeat in a race in which he completed the course. A spokesman for J P McManus said that Darlan "ran a cracker but just found one too good. There are no excuses." A month later, Darlan started 7/4 favourite for the Grade II Tangle Teaser Top Novices' Hurdle at Aintree Racecourse with his main opposition appearing to come from Prospect Wells, a former flat racer who had won the Prix Greffulhe and finished second in the Grand Prix de Paris. Darlan took the lead at the final hurdle and went away to win by three and three quarter lengths from Captain Conan (also trained by Henderson), with Prospect Wells seven lengths back in third. After the race, Henderson said, "One day Darlan will jump fences. He's a big weakly sort of a horse. He's got a lot of physical development in him still. I suspect he might stay over hurdles but we've only brushed at it. We've got all summer to think about it", while McCoy described the winner as "a good horse [with] the potential to be a very good horse". Bookmakers responded by offering odds of between 12/1 and 16/1 for the following year's Champion Hurdle.

=== 2012/2013 National Hunt season ===
After a break of more than eight months, Darlan returned in the Grade I Christmas Hurdle in the Boxing Day meeting at Kempton Park. He started at odds of 3/1 in a field of seven which included Cinders and Ashes, Countrywide Flame (Triumph Hurdle) and Punjabi, the winner of the 2009 Champion Hurdle. Darlan took the lead from Punjabi approaching the second last hurdle and accelerated clear of the field to win by four and a half lengths from Raya Star. Henderson commented, "We've always thought he had a lot of ability... he's beaten them fair and square. I think he'll be a chaser one day, but that will come further down the line." Bookmakers responded by making Darlan the 4/1 favourite for the Champion Hurdle, ahead of Hurricane Fly and Rock On Ruby.

On 4 February 2013, a date which Marcus Armytage writing in The Daily Telegraph was to describe as "a black day for racing", Darlan faced the 2012 Champion Hurdler Rock On Ruby, as well as Countrywide Flame, in the 32Red Hurdle at Doncaster Racecourse. He raced in third place before moving up to challenge Rock On Ruby at the final hurdle. He fell heavily at the obstacle, sending McCoy bouncing over the turf "like a rag doll": Darlan had sustained a broken neck and died on the spot. Henderson said, "This is some game. Why is it always the good ones?" Robin Oakley, writing in The Spectator, described Darlan as "the most exciting hurdler in training" at the time of his death.

== Pedigree ==
Pedigree of Darlan (GB), bay gelding, 2007
Sire Milan (IRE) 1998	Sadler's Wells (USA); 1981	Northern Dancer	Nearctic
Sire Milan (IRE) 1998	Sadler's Wells (USA); 1981	Northern Dancer	Natalma
Sire Milan (IRE) 1998	Sadler's Wells (USA); 1981	Fairy Bridge	Bold Reason
Sire Milan (IRE) 1998	Sadler's Wells (USA); 1981	Fairy Bridge	Special
Sire Milan (IRE) 1998	Kithanga (IRE); 1990	Darshaan	Shirley Heights
Sire Milan (IRE) 1998	Kithanga (IRE); 1990	Darshaan	Delsy
Sire Milan (IRE) 1998	Kithanga (IRE); 1990	Kalata	Assert
Sire Milan (IRE) 1998	Kithanga (IRE); 1990	Kalata	Kalkeen
Dam Darbela (IRE) 1994	Doyoun (IRE); 1985	Mill Reef	Never Bend
Dam Darbela (IRE) 1994	Doyoun (IRE); 1985	Mill Reef	Milan Mill
Dam Darbela (IRE) 1994	Doyoun (IRE); 1985	Dumka	Kashmir
Dam Darbela (IRE) 1994	Doyoun (IRE); 1985	Dumka	Faizebad
Dam Darbela (IRE) 1994	Darata (IRE); 1988	Vayrann	Brigadier Gerard
Dam Darbela (IRE) 1994	Darata (IRE); 1988	Vayrann	Val Divine
Dam Darbela (IRE) 1994	Darata (IRE); 1988	Darazina	Labus
Dam Darbela (IRE) 1994	Darata (IRE); 1988	Darazina	Djebellina (Family 1-e)
