= Milan (horse) =

British-bred Thoroughbred racehorse (1998–2022)

- Racing colours of Michael Tabor
- Sire: Sadler's Wells
- Grandsire: Northern Dancer
- Dam: Kithanga
- Damsire: Darshaan
- Sex: Stallion
- Foaled: 8 March 1998
- Died: 21 December 2022 (aged 24)
- Country: United Kingdom
- Colour: Bay
- Breeder: Fittocks Stud
- Owner: Michael Tabor & Susan Magnier
- Trainer: Aidan O'Brien
- Record: 10: 3-2-1
- Earnings: £673,883

Major wins
- Great Voltigeur Stakes (2001); St. Leger Stakes (2001)

Milan (8 March 1998 – 21 December 2022) was a Thoroughbred racehorse and sire who was bred in Britain but trained in Ireland. In a career which lasted from October 2000 until May 2002, he ran ten times and won three races. He recorded his most important success when winning the Classic St. Leger Stakes as a three-year-old in 2001. In the same year also won the Great Voltigeur Stakes and finished second in the Breeders' Cup Turf. He was retired after being injured in his only race as a four-year-old and became a successful National Hunt sire.

== Background ==
Milan was a bay horse with a large white star and four white feet, who was bred at the Fittocks Stud at Upend, Newmarket in Suffolk. The stud is managed by Sara Cumani, the wife of the trainer Luca Cumani. Milan is one of numerous top-class middle-distance runners sired by the thirteen-time Champion sire Sadler's Wells. His dam Kithanga was a successful racemare who won the St. Simon Stakes and finished third in the Irish St. Leger. As a yearling, Milan was sent to the Tattersalls sales at Newmarket, where he was bought for 650,000 guineas by the bloodstock agent Dermot "Demi" O'Byrne on behalf of the Coolmore organisation. Like many of the Coolmore horses he was sent into training with Aidan O'Brien at Ballydoyle. He was registered for racing purposes as being owned by either Michael Tabor, Susan Magnier or a partnership of the two.

== Racing career ==
=== 2000: two-year-old season ===
Milan did not appear until the autumn of his two-year-old season when he began his racing career at the Curragh on 15 October. Contesting the Kildare Maiden Stakes he was ridden by Colm O'Donoghue and started at odds of 9/1 in a field of twenty-two runners. Milan tracked the leaders before moving into the lead a furlong from the finish and quickened clear to win "easily" by three and a half lengths from his stable companion Leopard Spot.

=== 2001: three-year-old season ===
Milan began his three-year-old season in the Listed Ballysax Stakes at Leopardstown on 16 April. He started at odds of 7/1 and finished second to the subsequent Epsom Derby winner Galileo, with Vinnie Roe in third. With his stable companion Galileo aimed for the Derby, Milan was sent to contest Group One races in France. He finished a half length third to Chichicastenago in the Prix Lupin at Longchamp in May after which O'Brien called Milan "still a big baby". In the Prix du Jockey Club at Chantilly in June he was poorly drawn and stumbled exiting the stalls before finishing "powerfully" to take fifth place behind Anabaa Blue. In these races he was ridden by Mick Kinane who rode Milan in all his subsequent races.

Later in June, Milan started favourite for the King Edward VII Stakes at Royal Ascot but finished fourth of the twelve runners behind Storming Home. Milan and Storming Home met again in the Great Voltigeur Stakes at York in August. On this occasion, Milan started second favourite at 6/1, despite receiving three pounds from his English-trained opponent. Kinane restrained Milan in the early stages before moving him forward in the straight. He took the lead a furlong from the finish and stayed on to beat Storming Home by 1 1/2 lengths. Aidan O'Brien explained that the colt had been given a break since things had happened "a bit quick for him" in France and at Ascot, and that he had been looking fresh in training. The Racing Post described Milan as looking "stylish and progressive".

At Doncaster on 15 September, Milan started the 13/8 favourite for the St Leger against nine opponents over 14 1/2 furlongs. Milan was held up at the rear of the field before making steady progress but appeared to be boxed in on the rail before being switched to the outside in the straight. He took the lead a furlong from the finish and pulled clear of the field with what the BBC described as an "incredible burst of speed" to win by five lengths from Demophilos and Mr Combustible. Kinane, winning the race at his first attempt at the age of forty-two, described Milan as "the class horse in the race". Following his Classic win, Milan was brought back in distance to contest the Prix de l'Arc de Triomphe at Longchamp. As part of the Ballydoyle entry, he started 4.8/1 third favourite. He stayed on steadily in the straight, but was never able to reach the leaders and finished fifth behind Sakhee. The final start of Milan's three-year-old season saw him race outside Europe for the only time as he was sent to Belmont Park for the Breeders' Cup Turf. He was towards the rear of the eleven horse field for much of the way before moving into fourth place at the turn into the straight. In the closing stages he stayed on strongly but failed by three quarters of a length to catch the leader Fantastic Light with the two European horses finishing almost six lengths clear of the rest of the runners.

=== 2002: four-year-old season ===
On his four-year-old debut, Milan was made evens favourite for the Mooresbridge Stakes at the Curragh on 6 May 2002. He had been considered doubtful for the race after sustaining a bruised foot in training, but was cleared to run after an X-ray examination. He raced in third place before sustaining an injury and being pulled-up by Kinane approaching the straight. The injury proved to be fracture of the colt's cannon bone, and Milan was retired to stud.

== Stud career ==
Milan was retired to stand for his owners' Coolmore Stud organisation and was primarily marketed as a National Hunt stallion. He was based at the Grange Stud, Fermoy, County Cork, where he stood at an initial stud fee of €3,500, rising to a peak of €10,000 in 2020. His winners include Jezki, Darlan, Raya Star (Scottish Champion Hurdle) and One For Arthur. By December 2022 he had sired 38 individual Graded race winners and was champion National Hunt sire in the 2019–20 season. He died on 21 December 2022, at the age of 24.

== Pedigree ==
Pedigree of Milan (GB) bay 1998
Sire Sadler's Wells (USA) 1981	Northern Dancer (CAN); 1961	Nearctic	Nearco
Sire Sadler's Wells (USA) 1981	Northern Dancer (CAN); 1961	Nearctic	Lady Angela
Sire Sadler's Wells (USA) 1981	Northern Dancer (CAN); 1961	Natalma	Native Dancer
Sire Sadler's Wells (USA) 1981	Northern Dancer (CAN); 1961	Natalma	Almahmoud
Sire Sadler's Wells (USA) 1981	Fairy Bridge (USA); 1975	Bold Reason	Hail to Reason
Sire Sadler's Wells (USA) 1981	Fairy Bridge (USA); 1975	Bold Reason	Lalun
Sire Sadler's Wells (USA) 1981	Fairy Bridge (USA); 1975	Special	Forli
Sire Sadler's Wells (USA) 1981	Fairy Bridge (USA); 1975	Special	Thong
Dam Kithanga (IRE) 1990	Darshaan (GB); 1981	Shirley Heights	Mill Reef
Dam Kithanga (IRE) 1990	Darshaan (GB); 1981	Shirley Heights	Hardiemma
Dam Kithanga (IRE) 1990	Darshaan (GB); 1981	Delsy	Abdos
Dam Kithanga (IRE) 1990	Darshaan (GB); 1981	Delsy	Kelty
Dam Kithanga (IRE) 1990	Kalata (IRE); 1984	Assert	Be My Guest
Dam Kithanga (IRE) 1990	Kalata (IRE); 1984	Assert	Irish Bird
Dam Kithanga (IRE) 1990	Kalata (IRE); 1984	Kalkeen	Sheshoon
Dam Kithanga (IRE) 1990	Kalata (IRE); 1984	Kalkeen	Gioia (family: 5-e)
