= Champion Standard Open NH Flat Race =

National Hunt flat horse race in Britain

Champion Standard Open NH Flat Race
2026
Forthfactor	Look Me	Merlin Allen

Previous years
2025
Green Splendour	Destination Dubai	Koktail Brut
2024
Horaces Pearl	Tripoli Flyer	Good And Clever
2023
Florida Dreams	Blizzard Of Oz	Hasthing
2022
Lookaway	Hullnback	Leave Of Absence
2021
Knappers Hill	Peking Rose	Stage Star

2020-2011
2019
Mcfabulous	Thebannerkingrebel	Santa Rossa
2018
Portrush Ted	Kateson	Harambe
2017
Lalor	Enniscoffey Oscar	Western Ryder
2016
Bacardys	Battleford	The Minch
2015
Barters Hill	Bellshill	Potters Corner
2014
Ballybolley	Relic Rock	Aqalim
2013
Killyglass	Vago Collonges	Caledonia
2012
The New One	My Tent Or Yours	Sir Johnson
2011
Steps To Freedom	Montbazon	Allure of Illusion

2010-2001
2010
Megastar	Dare Me	Whispering Hills
2009
Sitting Tennant	Lidar	Giordano Bruno
2008
Honest John	Touch of Irish	Cape Tribulation
2007
Theatrical Moment	Kealshore Boy	Lease Lend
2006
Pangbourne	Tidal Bay	Kicks For Free
2005
The Cool Guy	Some Touch	Mendo
2004
Diamond Sal	Young Scotton	Rebel Rhythm
2003
Classic Native	Be Fair	Tighten Your Belt
2002
Kickham	Iris's Gift	Touch Closer
2001
The Bajan Bandit	Posh Pearl	Zero Risk

2000-1999
2000
Quadco	Rose of Tracarta	Patriarch
1999
King of the Castle	Errand Boy	Always Wayward

The Champion Standard Open NH Flat Race is a Grade 2 National Hunt flat race in Great Britain which is open to horses aged from four to six years. It is run at Aintree over a distance of about 2 miles and 1 furlong (2 miles and 209 yards, or 3,410 metres), and it is scheduled to take place each year during the Grand National meeting in early April.

The event was established in 1987, and it was given Grade 2 status in 1995. It was sponsored by John Smith's from 2005 to 2013 and by Weatherbys Racing Bank since 2014. The field sometimes includes horses which ran previously in the Champion Bumper.

== Records ==
Leading jockey (2 wins):

- Sam Twiston-Davies - The New One (2012), Ballybolley (2014)

Leading trainer (4 wins):

- Nigel Twiston-Davies – King's Road (1998), The Cool Guy (2005), The New One (2012), Ballybolley (2014)

== Winners ==
Year	Winner	Age	Jockey	Trainer
1987	Rustle	5	Michael Bowlby	Nicky Henderson
1988	Black Moccasin	5	Wayne O'Callaghan	Jenny Pitman
	no race 1989
1990	Going On	4	Brendan McGiff	Sally Hall
1991	Dual Image	4	Adrian Maguire (Note: amateur jockey)	Jimmy FitzGerald
1992	Brief Gale	5	Philip Hide	Josh Gifford
1993	Native Field	4	Willie Dwan	Jimmy FitzGerald
1994	Nahla	4	Sean Curran	Jacqui Doyle
1995	Dante's Cavalie	5	Denis Leahy	David Gandolfo
1996	Burn Out	4	Leighton Aspell	Jeff Pearce
1997	Abandoned due to a security alert
1998	King's Road	5	Martin Keighley	Nigel Twiston-Davies
1999	King of the Castle	4	Liam Corcoran	Jenny Pitman
2000	Quadco	6	Davy Russell	Pat Fahy
2001	The Bajan Bandit	6	Bruce Gibson	Len Lungo
2002	Kickham	6	Philip Fenton	Edward O'Grady
2003	Classic Native	5	Ron Flavin	Jonjo O'Neill
2004	Diamond Sal	6	Fergus King	Mary Reveley
2005	The Cool Guy	5	Steven Crawford	Nigel Twiston-Davies
2006	Pangbourne	5	Robert Thornton	Alan King
2007 (Note: The 2007 edition was run in May after the original race was abandoned due to a Grand National faller being treated on the course.)	Theatrical Moment	4	Tony Dobbin	Alan Swinbank
2008	Honest John	4	Keith Mercer	Tom Tate
2009	Sitting Tennant	6	Richard McGrath	Kate Walton
2010	Megastar	5	Jamie Moore	Gary L. Moore
2011	Steps To Freedom	5	Paul Carberry	Gordon Elliott
2012	The New One	4	Sam Twiston-Davies	Nigel Twiston-Davies
2013	Killyglass	6	Noel Fehily	Emma Lavelle
2014	Ballybolley	5	Sam Twiston-Davies	Nigel Twiston-Davies
2015	Barters Hill	5	David Bass	Ben Pauling
2016	Bacardys	5	Patrick Mullins	Willie Mullins
2017	Lalor	5	Richard Johnson	Richard Woollacott
2018	Portrush Ted	6	Gavin Sheehan	Warren Greatrex
2019	McFabulous	5	Harry Cobden	Paul Nicholls
	no race 2020 (Note: The 2020 running was cancelled because of the COVID-19 pandemic in the United Kingdom)
2021	Knappers Hill	5	Megan Nicholls	Paul Nicholls
2022	Lookaway	5	Jack Quinlan	Neil King
2023	Florida Dreams	5	Danny McMenamin	Nicky Richards
2024	Horaces Pearl	6	Conor Brace	Fergal O'Brien
2025	Green Splendour	5	Patrick Mullins	Willie Mullins
2026	Forthfactor	5	Heidi Palin	Dan Skelton

== See also ==
- Horse racing in Great Britain
- List of British National Hunt races
