= Rooster Booster =

British-bred Thoroughbred racehorse

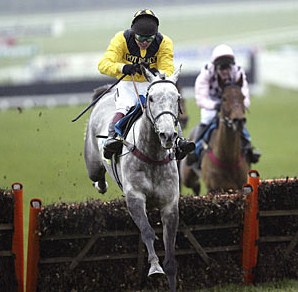
- Sire: Riverwise
- Grandsire: Riverman
- Dam: Came Cottage
- Damsire: Nearly A Hand
- Sex: Gelding
- Foaled: 1 April 1994
- Country: Great Britain
- Colour: Grey
- Breeder: Mrs E Mitchell
- Owner: Richard Mitchell; Terry Warner
- Trainer: Richard Mitchell; Philip Hobbs
- Record: 46: 10-14-6
- Earnings: £687,541

Major wins
- County Handicap Hurdle (2002); Greatwood Handicap Hurdle (2002); Bula Hurdle (2002); Agfa Hurdle (2003); Champion Hurdle (2003); Champion Hurdle Trial (2004)

Rooster Booster (1994–2005) was a British-bred thoroughbred racehorse, best known for winning the 2003 Champion Hurdle.

== Background ==
Rooster Booster was a gelding whose grey coat (inherited from his dam Came Cottage) and racing style made him easily recognisable. He was the only horse of any consequence produced by the unsuccessful racehorse Riverwise. He was originally trained by his owner Norman Richard Mitchell in Dorset but had his biggest successes after he was bought by Terry Warner in 2000 and sent to the stable of Philip Hobbs at Withycombe in Somerset.

== Early career ==
Rooster Booster began his racing career in a National Hunt Flat Race at Wincanton in February 1999, where he finished seventh of eighteen runners. He had six more runs for Richard Mitchell, winning just one of those in the form, a maiden hurdle at Taunton. He was then switched to the yard of Philip Hobbs and made his debut for him in April 2000, finishing 2nd behind Valiramix in a Novices' Hurdle at Chepstow. He had one more run that season, finishing third in a competitive Novice Hurdle at Punchestown.

He began the 2000/01 season with little success, being pulled up at Chepstow at the beginning of November, before falling at Newbury later that month. He then improved to be placed in his next four races, including Pierse Hurdle at Leopardstown and the Imperial Cup at Sandown. His season ended when he was pulled up at Aintree in April in a Handicap Hurdle.

Rooster Booster reappeared in the 2001/02 season, in a Listed Handicap Hurdle at Cheltenham, finishing fifth. He followed up that effort by finishing fifth and fourth in Handicap Hurdles at Sandown and Ascot. In his next two races, he finished second to the Martin Pipe-trained Copeland in valuable handicaps at Cheltenham and Newbury. He then gained his first victory for Philip Hobbs when coming from well off the pace to lead at the last hurdle and win the County Hurdle at the Cheltenham Festival, with Copeland back in fifteenth. His trainer stepped him up to Grade I class, where he finished fourth in the Aintree Hurdle, behind Ilnamar.

== Champion Hurdler ==
The following season (2002/03) proved to the most successful of Rooster Booster's career. He began with victories in Listed Hurdles at Kempton and Cheltenham, before he won the Grade 1 Bula Hurdle at odds of 11/8, coming home 2 1/2 lengths in front of Landing Light. That was followed by another victory in the Agfa Hurdle before going to Cheltenham undefeated in four races.

He was sent off the 9/2 second favourite for the Champion Hurdle behind the 5/2 favourite, Rhinestone Cowboy. Rooster Booster moved up to challenge two hurdles from home, quickened into a clear lead approaching the last, and stayed on strongly up the Cheltenham hill, coming home eleven lengths clear of the second, Westender. His rider, Richard Johnson, said of the gelding, "he's a bit wooden-headed, but it's hard to complain when he keeps going like that. He's a jockey's dream."

Rooster Booster was then sent to Liverpool to contest the Aintree Hurdle in April, where he was sent off the 5/4 favourite. He led over the last but was caught in the closing stages and beaten a head by the Edward O'Grady-trained Sacundai after Johnson dropped his whip on the run to the finish.

In the course of the season, the nine-year-old improved his rating from 144 to 170.

The 2003/04 season saw Rooster Booster win just one race, the Champion Hurdle Trial, but he ran consistently well in top races, finishing second in four Grade I races: the Christmas Hurdle, Champion Hurdle, Aintree Hurdle, and Punchestown Champion Hurdle.

== Later career ==
Rooster Booster ran in many of the same races in the following season, 2004/5, but with little success. After finishing second in the Christmas Hurdle, he finished down the field in both the Champion Hurdle and the Aintree Hurdle. He did win the Concept Hurdle at Sandown in April, before ending the season finishing fourth in the Swinton Hurdle.

Rooster Booster began the 2005/06 season with victory at Huntingdon and followed that up with a run in the Greatwood Hurdle, where he finished fourteenth.

== Death ==
On 20 December 2005, Rooster Booster collapsed during a routine training session in preparation for a run in the Christmas Hurdle and died from heart failure. The Independent described him as one of racing's "most cherished champions", while his regular jockey Richard Johnson said, "He gave great pleasure not only to myself but to the owner and to everyone connected with him".
