= Greatwood Hurdle =

Hurdle horse race in Britain

Greatwood Hurdle
2026
Pioneer Pete	Tennessee Tango	Morning Mayhem

Previous years
2025
Alexei	Helnwein	Faivoir
2024
Burdett Road	Be Aware	Dysart Enos
2023
Iberico Lord	Lookaway	Luccia
2022
I Like To Move It	Gin Coco	Harbour Lake
2021
West Cork	Adagio	No Ordinary Joe

2020-2011
2020
The Shunter	Ballyandy	Tegerek
2019
Harambe	Gumball	Monsieur Lecoq
2018
Nietzsche	Silver Streak	Old Guard
2017
Elgin	Misterton	Old Guard
2016
North Hill Harvey	Modus	Song Light
2015
Old Guard	Superb Story	Waxies Dargle
2014
Garde La Victoire	Vaniteux	Clondaw Warrior
2013
Dell' Arca	Sametegal	Rawnaq
2012
Olofi	Cash And Go	Cause of Causes
2011
Brampour	Olofi	Abergavenny

2010-2001
2010
Menorah	Bothy	Manyriverstocross
2009
Khyber Kim	Harry Tricker	Medermit
2008
Numide	Aigle D'or	King's Revenge
2007
Sizing Europe	Osana	Chivalry
2006
Detroit City	Ameeq	Caraman
2005
Lingo	Tramantano	Phar Bleu
2004
Accordion Etoile	Westender	Perouse
2003
Rigmarole	Caracciola	Hasty Prince
2002
Rooster Booster	Quazar	Dark'n Sharp
2001
Westender	The French Furze	Batswing

2000-1991
2000
Hulysse Royal	The French Furze	Doctor Goddard
1999
Rodock	She's Our Mare	Star Rage
1998
Grey Shot	Tyrolean Dream	Fatehalkhair
1997
Mr Percy	Cadougold	Kerawi
1996
Space Trucker	Mystical City	Barna Boy
1995
Lonesome Train	Express Gift	Chief Minister
1994
Atours	Major Bugler	Chief Minister
1993
Leotard	Nahar	Jeassu
1992
Valfinet	Ketti	Peanuts Pet
1991
Shu Fly	Egypt Mill Prince	Dawson City

1990-1987
1990
Liadett	Midfielder	Shu Fly
1989
Highland Bounty	Nahar	Imperial Brush
1988
South Parade	Windbound Lass	Santopadre
1987
Celtic Shot	Nos Na Gaoithe	Firm Price

The Greatwood Hurdle is a Grade 3 National Hunt hurdle race in Great Britain which is open to horses aged three years or older. It is run on the Old Course at Cheltenham over a distance of about 2 miles and half a furlong (2 miles and 87 yards, or 3,298 metres), and during its running there are eight hurdles to be jumped. It is a handicap race, and it is scheduled to take place each year in November.

The event has been run under various titles, and for a period it was classed at Listed level. It was sponsored on behalf of Greatwood, a charity for the welfare of retired racehorses, from 2003 to 2011. It was run as the Racing Post Hurdle when the Racing Post began sponsored the race in 2012 and from 2013 the sponsorship was taken over by the Stan James bookmaking firm and the name of Greatwood returned to the race title. It attained Grade 3 status in 2004. Unibet became the race's title sponsor in 2017 after purchasing the Stan James business.

== Winners ==
- Weights given in stones and pounds.

Year	Winner	Age ha	Weight	Jockey	Trainer
1962	Beaver II	4	11-04	Fred Winter	Ryan Price
1963	Cash	5	10-06	Paul Kelleway	Sid Dale
1964	Sky Pink	7	10-05	Jeff King	John Sutcliffe Jr.
1965	Makaldar	5	11-11	David Mould	Peter Cazalet
1966	Rackham	5	10-06	David Mould	R Hobson
1967	Bric-Brac	8	10-04	Joe Guest	Harry Hannon
1968	Some Jest	4	10-08	Paul Kelleway	Ryan Price
1969	Dunela	5	10-07	Johnny Haine	Reg Hollinshead
1970	At A Pinch	4	10-07	Bob Davies	Colin Davies
1971	Flower Picker	5	12-03	Stan Mellor	Fulke Walwyn
1972	Cantlie	6	11-00	Richard Smith (Note: amateur rider)	Les Kennard
1973	Kastrup	6	10-00	David Cartwright	David Barons
1974	Good Prospect	5	10-00	Richard Evans	John Edwards
1975	Hodge Hill	6	10-12	Paul Barton	David Gandolfo
1976	No race (Note: No racing took place at Cheltenham during the 1976/77 National Hunt season until 31st December, as the course was unfit for racing due to the effects of drought in the UK.)
1977	Battlement	5	9-09	Alan Flint	Eric Collingwood
1978	Baronial	5	11-10	Kevin Mooney	Fulke Walwyn
1979	Greenways	4	10-00	Jonjo O'Neill	Alan Jarvis
1980	Toy Master	5	9-10	Ben De Haan	Fred Winter
1981	Mr Foodbroker	6	10-06	John Lovejoy	Derek Kent
1982	Patricks Fair	6	10-00	Chris Seward	Derek Haydn Jones
1983	Palatinate	5	10-11	Peter Scudamore	David Nicholson
1984	Robin Wonder	6	11-04	Russ Arnott	David Elsworth
1985	Jim Thorpe	4	10-00	Denis Coakley	Gordon W. Richards
1986	Robin Wonder	8	11-10	Graham Bradley	David Elsworth
1987	Celtic Shot	5	10-06	Peter Scudamore	Fred Winter
1988	South Parade	4	11-00	Graham Bradley	Toby Balding
1989	Highland Bounty	5	10-04	Stuart Turner	Simon Dow
1990	Liadett	5	11-10	Mark Perrett	Martin Pipe
1991	Shu Fly	7	11-01	Steve Smith Eccles	Sally Oliver
1992	Valfinet	5	10-09	Peter Scudamore	Martin Pipe
1993	Leotard	6	12-00	Jamie Osborne	Oliver Sherwood
1994	Atours	6	11-05	Paul Holley	David Elsworth
1995	Lonesome Train	6	09-09	Barry Fenton	Colin Weedon
1996	Space Trucker	5	11-11	Jamie Osborne	Jessica Harrington
1997	Mr Percy	6	10-09	Philip Hide	Josh Gifford
1998	Grey Shot	6	11-05	Jamie Osborne	Ian Balding
1999	Rodock	5	10-00	Tony McCoy	Martin Pipe
2000	Hulysse Royal	5	10-00	Jimmy McCarthy	Oliver Sherwood
2001	Westender	5	10–13	Tony McCoy	Martin Pipe
2002	Rooster Booster	8	11–12	Seamus Durack	Philip Hobbs
2003	Rigmarole	5	11–12	Ruby Walsh	Paul Nicholls
2004	Accordion Etoile	5	10-06	John Cullen	Paul Nolan
2005	Lingo	6	10-06	Tony McCoy	Jonjo O'Neill
2006	Detroit City	4	11–12	Richard Johnson	Philip Hobbs
2007	Sizing Europe	5	11-06	Timmy Murphy	Henry de Bromhead
2008	Numide	5	10-03	Jamie Moore	Gary L. Moore
2009	Khyber Kim	7	11-09	Paddy Brennan	Nigel Twiston-Davies
2010	Menorah	5	11–12	Richard Johnson	Philip Hobbs
2011	Brampour	4	11-04	Harry Derham	Paul Nicholls
2012	Olofi	6	10–11	Paddy Brennan	Tom George
2013	Dell' Arca	4	10-05	Tom Scudamore	David Pipe
2014	Garde La Victoire	5	11-09	Richard Johnson	Philip Hobbs
2015	Old Guard	4	10-10	Harry Cobden	Paul Nicholls
2016	North Hill Harvey	5	11-00	Harry Skelton	Dan Skelton
2017	Elgin	5	10-08	Wayne Hutchinson	Alan King
2018	Nietzsche	5	09-07	Danny McMenamin	Brian Ellison
2019	Harambe	6	11-00	Tom Bellamy	Alan King
2020	The Shunter	7	10-00	Robbie Power	Emmet Mullins
2021	West Cork	7	10-13	Harry Skelton	Dan Skelton
2022	I Like To Move It	5	12-00	Sam Twiston-Davies	Nigel Twiston-Davies
2023	Iberico Lord	5	11-00	Nico de Boinville	Nicky Henderson
2024	Burdett Road	4	11-10	Harry Cobden	James Owen
2025	Alexei	5	11-04	Brendan Powell	Joe Tizzard
2026	Pioneer Pete	6	11-03	Jonjo O'Neill Jr	Jonjo O'Neill & AJ O'Neill

== See also ==
- Horse racing in Great Britain
- List of British National Hunt races
