= Leamington Novices' Hurdle =

Hurdle horse race in Britain

Leamington Novices' Hurdle
2023
Grey Dawning	Ginny's Destiny	Knowsley Road

Previous years
2022
Stag Horn	Gentleman At Arms	Scipion
2021
Adrimel	Mint Condition	Make Me A Believer

2020-2011
2020
Mossy Fen	Decor Irlandais	Shan Blue
2019
Beakstown	Stoney Mountain	Finawn Bawn
2018
Mr Whipped	Paisley Park	Knight In Dubai
2017
Willoughby Court	Gayebury	Peregrine Run
2016
Thomas Hobson	Open Eagle	Definite Outcome
2015
Three Musketeers	Ballagh	Shantou Bob
2014
Deputy Dan	Masters Hill	Splash of Ginge
2013
The New One	Mickie	Hold Court
2012
Cotton Mill	Ambion Wood	Same Difference
2011
Court in Motion	Neptune Equester	Safran De Cotte

2010-2002
2008
Carruthers	Nenuphar Collonges	Souffleur
2007
Labelthou	Zilcash	Hills of Aran
2006
Be Be King	Oscar Park	Miko de Beauchene
2005
No Refuge	Lady Zephyr	Bob Bob Bobbin
2004
Inglis Drever	Eric's Charm	He's The Boss
2002
Classified	Eurotrek	Lanzerac

The Leamington Novices' Hurdle was a Grade 2 National Hunt hurdle race in Great Britain which was open to horses aged five years or older. It was run at Warwick over a distance of about 2 miles and 5 furlongs (4,225 metres), and during its running there were eleven hurdles to be jumped. The race was for novice hurdlers, and took place each year in January. It was first run in 2002. From 2018 the race was sponsored by the Ballymore Group.

In April 2023 the British Horseracing Authority announced the removal of the race from the 2023/24 programme.

== Records ==
Leading jockey (3 wins):

- Harry Skelton – Three Musketeers (2015), Beakstown (2019), Grey Dawning (2023)

Leading trainer (3 wins):

- Dan Skelton - Three Musketeers (2015), Beakstown (2019), Grey Dawning (2023)

== Winners ==
Year	Winner	Age	Jockey	Trainer
2002	Classified	6	Tony McCoy	Martin Pipe
2003	Abandoned because of frost
2004	Inglis Drever	5	Graham Lee	Howard Johnson
2005	No Refuge	5	Graham Lee	Howard Johnson
2006	Be Be King	7	Ruby Walsh	Paul Nicholls
2007	Labelthou	8	Barry Fenton	Emma Lavelle
2008	Carruthers	5	Mattie Batchelor	Mark Bradstock
	no race 2009–10 (Note: The race was abandoned in 2009 because of frost and in 2010 because of snow)
2011	Court in Motion	6	Aidan Coleman	Emma Lavelle
2012	Cotton Mill	5	Jack Quinlan	John Ferguson
2013	The New One	5	Sam Twiston-Davies	Nigel Twiston-Davies
2014	Deputy Dan	6	Leighton Aspell	Oliver Sherwood
2015	Three Musketeers	5	Harry Skelton	Dan Skelton
2016	Thomas Hobson	6	Danny Mullins	Willie Mullins
2017	Willoughby Court	6	David Bass	Ben Pauling
2018	Mr Whipped	5	Nico de Boinville	Nicky Henderson
2019	Beakstown	6	Harry Skelton	Dan Skelton
2020	Mossy Fen	5	Sam Twiston-Davies	Nigel Twiston-Davies
2021	Adrimel	5	Richard Johnson	Tom Lacey
2022	Stag Horn	5	Nick Scholfield	Archie Watson
2023	Grey Dawning	6	Harry Skelton	Dan Skelton

== See also ==
- Horse racing in Great Britain
- List of British National Hunt races

== Sources ==
- Racing Post:
  - 2002, 2004, 2005, 2006, 2007, 2008, 2012, 2013, 2014, 2015
  - 2016, 2017, 2018, 2019, 2020, 2021, 2022, 2023

- pedigreequery.com – Leamington Novices' Hurdle – Warwick.
- breakingnews.ie – "Warwick abandoned" (2009).
- bbc.co.uk – "Weather prospects for racing" (2010).
