= Hyde Novices' Hurdle =

Hurdle horse race in Britain

Hyde Novices' Hurdle (Albert Bartlett Novices' Hurdle)
- Class: Grade 2
- Location: Cheltenham Racecourse; Cheltenham, England
- Race type: Hurdle race
- Sponsor: Albert Bartlett
- Website: Cheltenham

Race information
- Distance: 2m 5f (4,225 metres)
- Surface: Turf
- Track: Left-handed
- Qualification: Four-years-old and up
- Weight: 11 st 1 lb (4yo); 11 st 2 lb (5yo+); Allowances; 7 lb for fillies and mares Penalties; 5 lb for winners of a Class 1 wfa hurdle 3 lb for winners of a Class 2 wfa or Class 1 handicap hurdle
- Purse: £80,000 (2025); 1st: £47,552

Hyde Novices' Hurdle
2026
Lock Stock	Hitintheheadlines	Ferocimo

Previous years
2025
No Drama This End	Heads Up	King's Bucks
2024
Potters Charm	Valgrand	Gale Mahler
2023
Minella Missile	Captain Teague	The Big Doyen
2022
Hermes Allen	Music Drive	Weveallbeencaught
2021
Blazing Khal	Gelino Bello	Current Mood

2020-2011
2020
Does He Know	Wild Romance	Polish
2019
Thyme Hill	Champagne Well	Happygolucky
2018
Coolanly	Pym	Percy Veer
2017
On The Blind Side	Momella	Poetic Rhythm
2016
Peregrine Run	Wholestone	West Approach
2015
Shantou Village	Champers on Ice	Penglai Pavilion
2014
Parlour Games	Blaklion	Port Melon
2013
Creepy	Timesremembered	Port Melon
2012
Coneygree	Bondage	According To Trev
2011
Fingal Bay	Barbatos	Polisky

2010-2001
2010
Champion Court	Sybarite	Mount Helicon
2009
Tell Massini	Reve De Sivola	Berties Dream
2008
Diamond Harry	Door Boy	Dragon Eye
2007
Razor Royale	Nenuphar Collonges	What A Buzz
2006
Massini's Maguire	Wichita Lineman	Juveigneur
2005
Black Jack Ketchum	Powerstation	Massini's Maguire
2004
Brewster	Monte Vista	Majestic Bay
2003
Jollyolly	Fairwood Present	Champagne Harry
2002
Taming	Wouldn't You Agree	Wouldn't You Agree
2001
Tarxien	Hard To Start	Lucky Sinna

2000-1996
2000
Sheer Genius	Fnan	Spirit Glen
1999
Majestic	Copeland	River Gold
1998
Arctic Camper	Door To Door	Tara-Brogan
1997
Tidal Force	Song Of The Sword	Prospero
1996
Hunting Lore	Supermodel	Leap In The Dark

The Hyde Novices' Hurdle is a Grade 2 National Hunt hurdle race in Great Britain which is open to horses aged four years or older. It is run on the Old Course at Cheltenham over a distance of about 2 miles and 5 furlongs (4,225 metres), and during its running there are ten hurdles to be jumped. The race is for novice hurdlers, and it is scheduled to take place each year in November.

The event was given its present name when it attained Grade 2 status in 2008. Prior to this it had been run at a lower grade under various titles. From 2010 to 2016 the race was sponsored by Neptune Investment Management and run as the Neptune Investment Management Novices' Hurdle. Since 2024 it has been sponsored by Albert Bartlett and run as the Albert Bartlett Novices' Hurdle.

The race was first run in 1996.

== Winners ==
Year	Winner	Age	Jockey	Trainer
1996	Hunting Lore	5	Mick Fitzgerald	Nicky Henderson
1997	Tidal Force	6	Richard Dunwoody	Philip Hobbs
1998	Arctic Camper	6	Norman Williamson	Venetia Williams
1999	Majestic	4	Seamus Durack	Ian Williams
2000	Sheer Genius	4	Norman Williamson	Mark Pitman
2001	Tarxien	7	Tony McCoy	Martin Pipe
2002	Taming	6	Tony McCoy	Venetia Williams
2003	Jollyolly	4	Tony McCoy	Peter Bowen
2004	Brewster	7	David Dennis	Ian Williams
2005	Black Jack Ketchum	6	Tony McCoy	Jonjo O'Neill
2006	Massini's Maguire	5	Richard Johnson	Philip Hobbs
2007	Razor Royale	5	Paddy Brennan	Nigel Twiston-Davies
2008	Diamond Harry	5	Timmy Murphy	Nick Williams
2009	Tell Massini	5	Sam Thomas	Tom George
2010	Champion Court	5	Warren Marston	Martin Keighley
2011	Fingal Bay	5	Richard Johnson	Philip Hobbs
2012	Coneygree	5	Mattie Batchelor	Mark Bradstock
2013	Creepy	5	Ian Popham	Martin Keighley
2014	Parlour Games	6	Barry Geraghty	John Ferguson
2015	Shantou Village	5	Noel Fehily	Neil Mulholland
2016	Peregrine Run	6	Roger Loughran	Peter Fahey
2017	On The Blind Side	5	Nico de Boinville	Nicky Henderson
2018	Coolanly	6	Paddy Brennan	Fergal O'Brien
2019	Thyme Hill	5	Richard Johnson	Philip Hobbs
2020	Does He Know	5	David Bass	Kim Bailey
2021	Blazing Khal	5	Donal McInerney	Charles Byrnes
2022	Hermes Allen	5	Harry Cobden	Paul Nicholls
2023	Minella Missile	5	Adam Wedge	Evan Williams
2024	Potters Charm	5	Sam Twiston-Davies	Nigel Twiston-Davies
2025	No Drama This End	5	Harry Cobden	Paul Nicholls
2026	Lock Stock	6	Charlie Hammond	Stuart Edmunds

== See also ==
- Horse racing in Great Britain
- List of British National Hunt races
