= 2010 Champion Hurdle =

Horse race

80th Champion Hurdle
- Champion Hurdle
- Location: Cheltenham Racecourse
- Date: 16 March 2010
- Winning horse: Binocular (FR)
- Jockey: A. P. McCoy
- Trainer: Nicky Henderson (GB)
- Owner: J. P. McManus

The 2010 Champion Hurdle was a horse race held at Cheltenham Racecourse on Tuesday 16 March 2010. It was the 80th running of the Champion Hurdle.

The winner was J. P. McManus's Binocular, a six-year-old gelding trained in Berkshire by Nicky Henderson and ridden by A. P. McCoy. The victory was Henderson's fifth in the race, following See You Then (1985, 1986, 1987) and Punjabi (2009) and a third for McCoy, who had won in 1997 on Make A Stand and 2006 on Brave Inca.

Binocular, who had finished third when favourite for the previous year's race, won by three and a half lengths from Khyber Kim. Punjabi was the only previous Champion Hurdler in the field. All twelve of the runners completed the course. Binocular's win was controversial as Henderson had said in February that the horse would not run in the race. Khyber Kim's trainer Nigel Twiston-Davies said in 2014: "We won the Champion Hurdle four years ago but the horse who was taken out of the race, Binocular, turned up again".

== Race details ==
- Sponsor: Smurfit Kappa
- Purse: £370,000; First prize: £210,937
- Going: Good to Soft
- Distance: 2 miles 110 yards
- Number of runners: 12
- Winner's time: 3m 53.80

== Full result ==
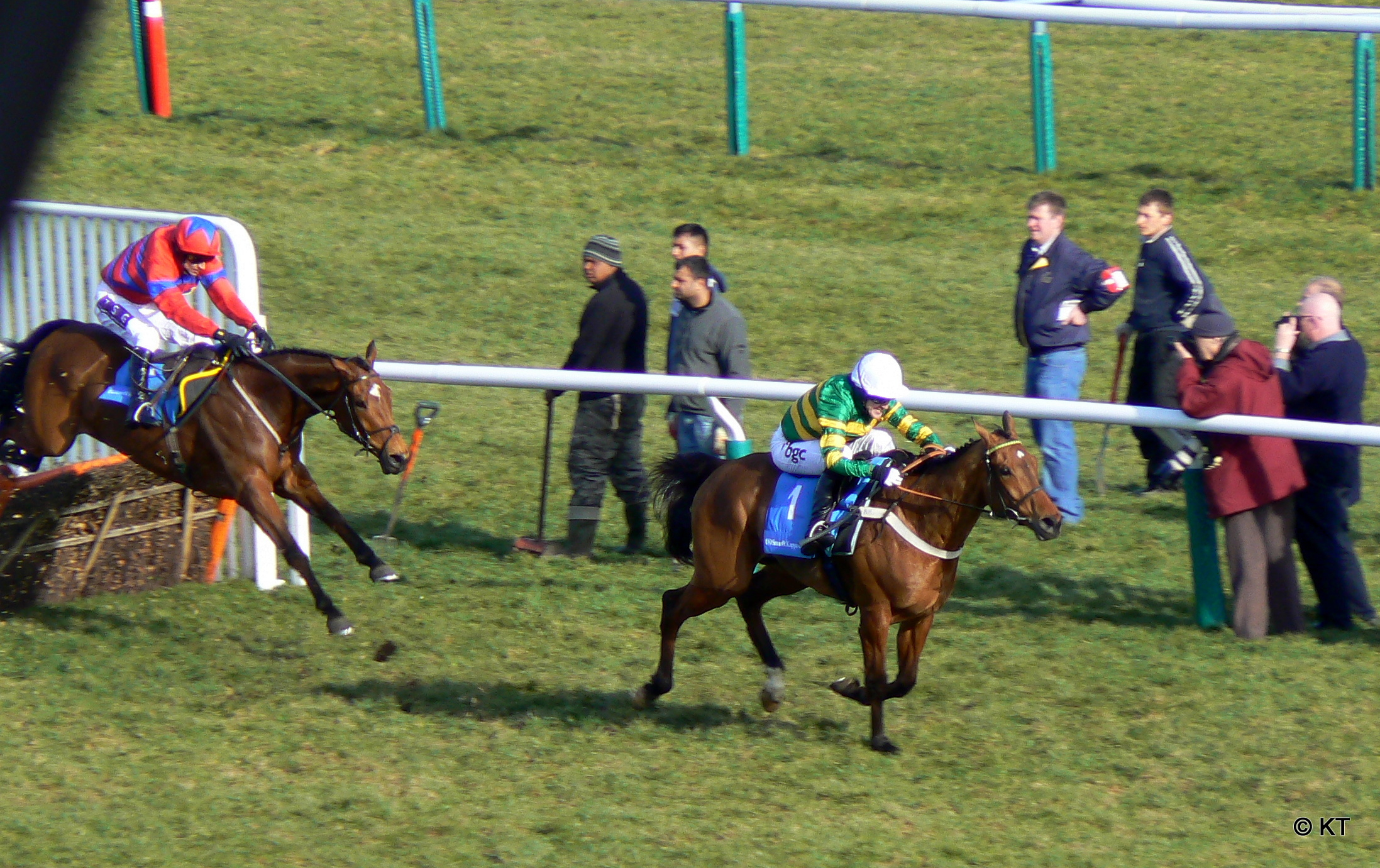
Binocular (right) wins the Champion Hurdle.

Pos.	Marg.	Horse (bred)	Age	Jockey	Trainer (Country)	Odds
1		Binocular (FR)	6	A. P. McCoy	Nicky Henderson (GB)	9/1
2	3½	Khyber Kim (GB)	8	Paddy Brennan	Nigel Twiston-Davies (GB)	7/1
3	6	Zaynar (FR)	5	Andrew Tinkler	Nicky Henderson (GB)	15/2
4	2½	Celestial Halo (IRE)	6	Ruby Walsh	Paul Nicholls (GB)	7/1
5	nse	Starluck (IRE)	5	Timmy Murphy	Alan Fleming (GB)	14/1
6	6	Solwhit (FR)	6	Davy Russell	Charles Byrnes (IRE)	6/1
7	¾	Medermit (FR)	6	Robert Thornton	Alan King (GB)	11/1
8	4½	Jumbo Rio (IRE)	5	Andrew McNamara	Edward O'Grady (IRE)	50/1
9	1¼	Punjabi (GB)	7	Barry Geraghty	Nicky Henderson (GB)	15/2
10	hd	Go Native (IRE)	7	Paul Carberry	Noel Meade (IRE)	11/4 fav
11	nk	Raise Your Heart (IRE)	7	John Cullen	Joanna Morgan (IRE)	100/1
12	19	Won In The Dark (IRE)	6	Graham Lee	Sabrina Harty (IRE)	40/1

- Abbreviations: nse = nose; nk = neck; hd = head; dist = distance; UR = unseated rider; PU = pulled up

== Winner's details ==
Further details of the winner, Binocular.

- Sex: Gelding
- Foaled: 5 April 2004
- Country: France
- Sire: Enrique; Dam: Blue Ciel et Blanc (Pistolet Bleu)
- Owner: J. P. McManus
- Breeder: Élie Lellouche
