= 2009 Champion Hurdle =

Horsing competition

79th Champion Hurdle
- Champion Hurdle
- Location: Cheltenham Racecourse
- Date: 10 March 2009
- Winning horse: Punjabi (GB)
- Jockey: Barry Geraghty
- Trainer: Nicky Henderson (GB)
- Owner: Raymond Tooth

The 2009 Champion Hurdle was a horse race held at Cheltenham Racecourse on Tuesday 10 March 2009. It was the 79th running of the Champion Hurdle.

The winner was Raymond Tooth's Punjabi, a six-year-old gelding trained in Berkshire by Nicky Henderson and ridden by Barry Geraghty. The victory was Henderson's fourth in the race, following See You Then in 1985, 1986 and 1987, and a first in the race for Geraghty.

Punjabi won at odds of 22/1 by a neck from the Triumph Hurdle winner Celestial Halo. The field included four previous winners of the race: Hardy Eustace (2004, 2005), Brave Inca (2006), Sublimity (2007) and Katchit (2008). Twenty-one of the twenty-three runners completed the course.

== Race details ==
- Sponsor: Smurfit Kappa
- Purse: £370,000; First prize: £210,937
- Going: Good to Soft
- Distance: 2 miles 110 yards
- Number of runners: 23
- Winner's time: 4m 00.90

== Full result ==
Pos.	Marg.	Horse (bred)	Age	Jockey	Trainer (Country)	Odds
1		Punjabi (GB)	6	Barry Geraghty	Nicky Henderson (GB)	22/1
2	nk	Celestial Halo (IRE)	5	Ruby Walsh	Paul Nicholls (GB)	17/2
3	hd	Binocular (FR)	5	A. P. McCoy	Nicky Henderson (GB)	6/4 fav
4	2¼	Crack Away Jack (GB)	5	Noel Fehily	Emma Lavelle (GB)	16/1
5	2¾	Muirhead (IRE)	6	Davy Condon	Noel Meade (IRE)	33/1
6	nk	Katchit (IRE)	6	Robert Thornton	Alan King (GB)	12/1
7	8	Snap Tie (IRE)	7	Richard Johnson	Philip Hobbs (GB)	40/1
8	3¼	Jered (IRE)	7	David Casey	Noel Meade (IRE)	33/1
9	½	Hardy Eustace (IRE)	12	Paddy Flood	Dessie Hughes (IRE)	100/1
10	3	Won In The Dark (IRE)	5	Davy Russell	Sabrina Harty (IRE)	33/1
11	¾	Osana (FR)	7	Andrew McNamara	David Pipe (GB)	13/2
12	3¼	Whiteoak (IRE)	6	Jason Maguire	Donald McCain (GB)	16/1
13	3¼	Blue Bajan (IRE)	7	Graham Lee	Andy Turnell (GB)	80/1
14	5	Sentry Duty (FR)	7	Andrew Tinkler	Nicky Henderson (GB)	33/1
15	14	Sublimity (FR)	9	Philip Carberry	Robert Hennessy (IRE)	20/1
16	7	Alph (GB)	12	Colin Bolger	Roger Teal (GB)	250/1
17	¾	Harchibald (FR)	10	Paul Carberry	Noel Meade (IRE)	33/1
18	3¼	Brave Inca (IRE)	11	Dominic Elsworth	Colm Murphy (IRE)	25/1
19	2½	Ashkazar (FR)	6	Timmy Murphy	David Pipe (GB)	14/1
20	2¾	Ebaziyan (IRE)	8	Paul Townend	Willie Mullins (IRE)	50/1
21	10	River Liane (FR)	5	Niall Madden	Thomas Cooper (IRE)	125/1
PU		Cybergenic (FR)	11	Keith Mercer	Paul Murphy (GB)	250/1
Fell		Othermix (FR)	5	Paddy Brennan	Tom George (GB)	100/1

- Abbreviations: nse = nose; nk = neck; hd = head; dist = distance; UR = unseated rider; PU = pulled up

== Winner's details ==
Further details of the winner, Punjabi.

- Sex: Gelding
- Foaled: 3 April 2003
- Country: Great Britain
- Sire: Komaite; Dam: Competa (Hernando)
- Owner: Raymond Tooth
- Breeder: J. H. Wilson
