= 2006 Champion Hurdle =

76th Champion Hurdle
- Champion Hurdle
- Location: Cheltenham Racecourse
- Date: 14 March 2006
- Winning horse: Brave Inca (IRE)
- Jockey: Tony McCoy
- Trainer: Colm Murphy (IRE)
- Owner: Novices Syndicate

The 2006 Champion Hurdle was a horse race held at Cheltenham Racecourse on Tuesday 14 March 2006. It was the 76th running of the Champion Hurdle.

The winner was the Novice Syndicate's Brave Inca, an eight-year-old gelding trained in Ireland by Colm Murphy and ridden by A. P. McCoy. The victory was the first in the race, for the owner and trainer. McCoy had previously won the race on Make A Stand in 1997.

Brave Inca started the 7/4 favourite and won by a length from Macs Joy, with Hardy Eustace, who had won the race for the last two years in third. Fourteen of the eighteen runners completed the course.

== Race details ==
- Sponsor: Smurfit Kappa
- Purse: £350,000; First prize: £202,683
- Going: Good to Soft
- Distance: 2 miles 110 yards
- Number of runners: 18
- Winner's time: 3m 50.00

== Full result ==
Pos.	Marg.	Horse (bred)	Age	Jockey	Trainer (Country)	Odds
1		Brave Inca (IRE)	8	Tony McCoy	Colm Murphy (IRE)	7/4 fav
2	1	Macs Joy (IRE)	7	Barry Geraghty	Jessica Harrington (IRE)	13/2
3	3½	Hardy Eustace (IRE)	9	Conor O'Dwyer	Dessie Hughes (IRE)	11/2
4	6	Al Eile (IRE)	6	Timmy Murphy	John Queally (IRE)	8/1
5	¾	Arcalis (GB)	6	Graham Lee	Howard Johnson (GB)	9/1
6	9	Briareus (GB)	6	Thomas Greenall (Note: amateur jockey)	Andrew Balding (GB)	20/1
7	shd	Kawagino (IRE)	6	Jamie Moore	Seamus Mullins (GB)	500/1
8	¾	Faasel (IRE)	6	Tony Dobbin	Nicky Richards (GB)	16/1
9	shd	The French Furze (IRE)	12	Brian Harding	Nicky Richards (GB)	150/1
10	8	Royal Shakespeare (FR)	7	Tom Scudamore	Tom Gollings (GB)	100/1
11	6	Intersky Falcon (IRE)	9	Mick Fitzgerald	Jonjo O'Neill (GB)	66/1
12	15	Admiral (IRE)	5	Paul O'Neill	Richard Guest (GB)	150/1
13	dist	Astonville (FR)	12	Benjamin Hitchcott	Phillippe Cottin (FR)	500/1
14	dist	Fiepes Shuffle (GER)	6	Paul Carberry	Christian von der Recke (GER)	50/1
PU		Leo's Luckyman (USA)	7	John McNamara	Roger Brookhouse (GB)	500/1
PU		Turnium (FR)	11	James Davies	Phillippe Cottin (FR)	500/1
Fell		Asian Maze (IRE)	7	Ruby Walsh	Thomas Mullins (FIRE)	12/1
Fell		Penzance (GB)	5	Robert Thornton	Alan King (GB)	40/1

- Abbreviations: nse = nose; nk = neck; hd = head; dist = distance; UR = unseated rider; PU = pulled up

== Winner's details ==
Further details of the winner, Brave Inca

- Sex: Gelding
- Foaled: 20 April 1998
- Country: Ireland
- Sire: Good Thyne; Dam: Wigwam Mam (Commanche Run)
- Owner: Novices Syndicate
- Breeder: D. W. Macauley
