= 2008 Champion Hurdle =

78th Champion Hurdle
- Champion Hurdle
- Location: Cheltenham Racecourse
- Date: 11 March 2008
- Winning horse: Katchit (IRE)
- Jockey: Robert Thornton
- Trainer: Alan King (GB)
- Owner: D S J P Syndicate

The 2008 Champion Hurdle was a horse race held at Cheltenham Racecourse on Tuesday 11 March 2008. It was the 78th running of the Champion Hurdle.

The winner was the DSJP Syndicate's Katchit, a five-year-old gelding trained in Wiltshire by Alan King and ridden by Robert Thornton. The victory was the first in the race, for owner, trainer and jockey.

Katchit won at odds of 10/1 by a length from Osana. As of 2017, he remains the only five-year-old to win the race since See You Then in 1985. The field included Sublimity, the winner of the race in the previous year. Fourteen of the fifteen runners completed the course.

== Race details ==
- Sponsor: Smurfit Kappa
- Purse: £350,000; First prize: £205,272
- Going: Good to Soft
- Distance: 2 miles 110 yards
- Number of runners: 15
- Winner's time: 4m 08.10

== Full result ==
Pos.	Marg.	Horse (bred)	Age	Jockey	Trainer (Country)	Odds
1		Katchit (IRE)	5	Robert Thornton	Alan King (GB)	10/1
2	1	Osana (FR)	6	Tom Scudamore	David Pipe (GB)	9/2
3	5	Punjabi (GB)	5	Barry Geraghty	Nicky Henderson (GB)	25/1
4	1	Sublimity (FR)	8	Philip Carberry	John Carr (IRE)	7/1
5	8	Straw Bear (USA)	7	Tony McCoy	Nick Gifford (GB)	20/1
6	2¼	Catch Me (GER)	6	Ruby Walsh	Edward O'Grady (IRE)	10/1
7	½	Afsoun (FR)	6	Mick Fitzgerald	Nicky Henderson (GB)	16/1
8	1¼	Farmer Brown (IRE)	7	Davy Russell	Pat Hughes (IRE)	50/1
9	7	Kawagino (IRE)	8	Wayne Kavanagh	Seamus Mullins (GB)	200/1
10	7	Harchibald (FR)	9	Paul Carberry	Noel Meade (IRE)	13/2
11	2½	Blythe Knight (IRE)	8	Dougie Costello	John Quinn (GB)	50/1
12	¾	Ebaziyan (IRE)	7	Davy Condon	Willie Mullins (IRE)	33/1
13	39	Contraband (GB)	10	Tom Dreaper	Paul Murphy (GB)	250/1
14	26	Sizing Europe (IRE)	6	Andrew McNamara	Henry de Bromhead (IRE)	2/1 fav
PU		Bobs Pride (IRE)	6	Denis O'Regan	Dermot Weld (IRE)	66/1

- Abbreviations: nse = nose; nk = neck; hd = head; dist = distance; UR = unseated rider; PU = pulled up

== Winner's details ==
Further details of the winner, Katchit

- Sex: Gelding
- Foaled: 23 February 2003
- Country: Ireland
- Sire: Kalanisi; Dam: Miracle (Ezzoud)
- Owner: D S J P Syndicate
- Breeder: Whitley Stud
