= 2020 Champion Hurdle =

90th Champion Hurdle
- Champion Hurdle
- Location: Cheltenham Racecourse
- Date: 10 March 2020
- Winning horse: Epatante
- Jockey: Barry Geraghty
- Trainer: Nicky Henderson

The 2020 Champion Hurdle was a horse race held at Cheltenham Racecourse on Tuesday 10 March 2021. It was the 90th running of the Champion Hurdle.

The race was won by the 2/1 favourite Epatante, ridden by Barry Geraghty and trained by Nicky Henderson.

== Race details ==
- Sponsor: Unibet
- Purse:
- Going:Soft
- Distance:2 miles 87 yards
- Number of runners: 17
- Winner's time: 4:07.03
