= 1952 Champion Hurdle =

Horse race

23rd Champion Hurdle
- Champion Hurdle
- Location: Cheltenham Racecourse
- Date: 4 March 1952
- Winning horse: Sir Ken (FR)
- Jockey: Tim Molony
- Trainer: Willie Stephenson

The 1952 Champion Hurdle was a horse race held at Cheltenham Racecourse on Tuesday 4 March 1952. It was the 23rd running of the Champion Hurdle and was the richest hurdle race of the calendar.

== Main contenders ==
The race featured Sir Ken (SP 3/1), a French bred horse who came into it with an untarnished reputation winning his 8 previous England starts over hurdles in facile fashion; Hatton's Grace (SP 13/2) triple champion (1949, 1950, 1951) was looking for his 4th consecutive win in the race but was 12 years old and disappointed last time out at Naas when unplaced, admittedly carrying 12st 7lb in very soft conditions; 11 yo National Spirit (SP 20/1) dual champion (1947, 1948) also looked as a "light of other days" getting beat last time out at Windsor 4 lengths by another live contender Noholme (SP 100/7) whose preparation was going very well and was sent into the race fitter than his previous starts of the season; Telegram II (SP 9/1) who was punted on several news papers as the value bet had form at the course, his jumping skills were very impressive and also had speed to match it proving himself previously a high class flat horse finishing 4th in the 1950 Derby; Hunza (SP 20/1) unbeaten in 6 starts over hurdles against lesser opposition was sent directly to the Champion Hurdle without a preparation run since early December and the same applied to last year's favourite Average (SP 100/7) who came directly into the race from a fall on his seasonal debut in October, his trainer reported that he had him back to his best after some blips in training exercises and other health issues; National Spirit's stablemate Approaval (SP 9/1) was 2 times winner and 2 times runner-up last season and made a good return on his seasonal debut winning by 3 lengths giving 21 pounds to the runner-up.; French-trained Fellah II (SP 100/7) had previously won all his 4 starts at Auteuil and was expected to run well while the Galway Hurdle winner Wye Fly (SP 100/8) was in good form as well and much fancied.

== Race analysis ==
As the race started the former dual champion National Spirit was sent into the lead but couldn't maintain it for long dropping out tamely along with the other veteran Hatton's Grace who never looked like landing the 4th time spoils. Sir Ken was in a prominent position throughout the race and approaching the final stages a great battle began between him, Noholme and Approval, the trio jumping the last flight in line. The crowd bursted in cheers for the heavily backed Sir Ken who started to move away winning by 2 lengths from Noholme, 4 lengths back to Approval with the 4th place going to the Tadcaster trained Average who ran a mighty race considering he hadn't had the ideal preparation with the last run back in October. The other fancy in the betting Telegram II "hit the third hurdle so hard that he nearly stopped. Long before the end he became tailed off and was pulled up before reaching the post".

The winner Sir Ken was at the time a five-year-old gelding trained in by Willie Stephenson and ridden by Tim Molony. It was the first victory of the Champion Hurdle hat trick which he completed in 1953 and 1954. The win extended his unbeaten streak to 9 hurdle races while he also had 1 win over flat and was described as: "among the best of all time, for today's opposition was most formidable" and "bids to become a popular idol."

== Race details ==
- Purse: £4320; First prize: £3672
- Distance: about 2 miles
- Going: Soft
- Number of runners: 16
