= 1997 Champion Hurdle =

68th Champion Hurdle
- Champion Hurdle
- Location: Cheltenham Racecourse
- Date: 11 March 1997
- Winning horse: Make A Stand (GB)
- Jockey: A. P. McCoy
- Trainer: Martin Pipe (GB)
- Owner: Peter Deal

The 1997 Champion Hurdle was a horse race held at Cheltenham Racecourse on Tuesday 11 March 1997. It was the 68th running of the Champion Hurdle.

The winner was Peter Deal's Make A Stand, a six-year-old chestnut gelding trained in Devon by Martin Pipe and ridden by A. P. McCoy. Make A Stand's victory was a first in the race for both jockey and owner: Pipe had previously won the race with Granville Again in 1993.

Make A Stand, formerly a moderate flat racer, but the winner of his last four hurdle races, started the 7/1 fourth choice in the betting and won by five lengths and three quarters of a length from the Irish challengers Theatreworld and Space Trucker. The only previous champion in the field was the 1996 winner Collier Bay who jumped poorly and was pulled up three hurdles from the finish. The 7/2 favourite Large Action who had finished third in 1994 and second in 1995 was pulled up after two hurdles. Fifteen of the seventeen runners completed the course.

== Race details ==
- Sponsor: Smurfit
- Purse: £208,900; First prize: £124,138
- Going: Good
- Distance: 2 miles 110 yards
- Number of runners: 17
- Winner's time: 3m 48.40

== Full result ==
Pos.	Marg.	Horse (bred)	Age	Jockey	Trainer (Country)	Odds
1		Make A Stand (GB)	6	A. P. McCoy	Martin Pipe (GB)	7/1
2	5	Theatreworld (IRE)	5	Norman Williamson	Aidan O'Brien (IRE)	33/1
3	¾	Space Trucker (IRE)	6	John Shortt	Jessica Harrington (IRE)	9/2
4	2	I'm Supposin (IRE)	5	Charlie Swan	Kevin Prendergast (IRE)	13/2
5	3½	Hill Society (IRE)	5	Jason Titley	Noel Meade (IRE)	100/1
6	shd	Sanmartino (IRE)	5	Richard Dunwoody	David Nicholson (GB)	9/1
7	¾	Pridwell (GB)	7	Chris Maude	Martin Pipe (GB)	25/1
8	2	Moorish (IRE)	7	David Bridgwater	Nigel Twiston-Davies (GB)	100/1
9	4	Cockney Lad (IRE)	8	Jim Culloty	Noel Meade (IRE)	33/1
10	3	Mistinguett (IRE)	5	Carl Llewellyn	Nigel Twiston-Davies (GB)	25/1
11	3	Zabadi (IRE)	5	Richard Johnson	David Nicholson (GB)	100/1
12	8	Dardjini (USA)	7	Conor O'Dwyer	Noel Meade (IRE)	50/1
13	1½	Bimsey (IRE)	7	Mick Fitzgerald	Reg Akehurst (GB)	33/1
14	10	Dreams End (GB)	9	Rodney Farrant	Peter Bowen (GB)	50/1
15	1	Guest Performance (IRE)	5	Richard Hughes	Dessie Hughes (IRE)	100/1
PU		Large Action (GB)	9	Jamie Osborne	Oliver Sherwood (GB)	7/2 fav
PU		Collier Bay (GB)	7	Graham Bradley	Jim Old (GB)	4/1

- Abbreviations: nse = nose; nk = neck; hd = head; dist = distance; UR = unseated rider; PU = pulled up; LFT = left at start; SU = slipped up; BD = brought down

== Winner's details ==
Further details of the winner, Make A Stand

- Sex: Gelding
- Foaled: 21 March 1991
- Country: United Kingdom
- Sire: Master Willie; Dam: Make A Signal (Royal Gunner)
- Owner: Peter Deal
- Breeder: R. M. West
