= 2005 Champion Hurdle =

75th Champion Hurdle
- Champion Hurdle
- Location: Cheltenham Racecourse
- Date: 15 March 2005
- Winning horse: Hardy Eustace (IRE)
- Jockey: Conor O'Dwyer
- Trainer: Dessie Hughes (IRE)
- Owner: Laurence Byrne

The 2005 Champion Hurdle was a horse race held at Cheltenham Racecourse on Tuesday 15 March 2005. It was the 75th running of the Champion Hurdle.

The race was won for the second consecutive year by Laurence Byrne's Hardy Eustace, an eight-year-old gelding trained in Ireland by Dessie Hughes and ridden by Conor O'Dwyer.

Hardy Eustace started the 7/2 joint-favourite and led throughout to win by a neck from Harchibald, with Brave Inca in third. The other runners included Rooster Booster (winner of the race in 2003), Back In Front, Macs Joy, Al Eile and Intersky Falcon. All fourteen runners completed the course.

== Race details ==
- Sponsor: Smurfit
- Purse: £300,000; First prize: £174,000
- Going: Good
- Distance: 2 miles 110 yards
- Number of runners: 14
- Winner's time: 3m 51.50

== Full result ==
Pos.	Marg.	Horse (bred)	Age	Jockey	Trainer (Country)	Odds
1		Hardy Eustace (IRE)	8	Conor O'Dwyer	Dessie Hughes (IRE)	7/2 jt fav
2	nk	Harchibald (FR)	6	Paul Carberry	Noel Meade (IRE)	7/1
3	nk	Brave Inca (IRE)	7	Barry Cash	Colm Murphy (IRE)	10/1
4	3	Accordion Etoile (IRE)	6	John Cullen	Paul Nolan (IRE)	14/1
5	1½	Macs Joy (IRE)	6	Barry Geraghty	Jessica Harrington (IRE)	7/1
6	½	Intersky Falcon (GB)	8	Tony Dobbin	Jonjo O'Neill (GB)	40/1
7	2	Al Eile (IRE)	5	Timmy Murphy	John Queally (IRE)	25/1
8	3	Rooster Booster (GB)	11	Richard Johnson	Philip Hobbs (GB)	16/1
9	nk	Back In Front (IRE)	8	Ruby Walsh	Edward O'Grady (IRE)	7/2 jt fav
10	1¾	Self Defense (GB)	8	Robert Thornton	Patrick Chamings (GB)	20/1
11	3	Royal Shakespeare (FR)	6	Jim Culloty	Steve Gollings (GB)	50/1
12	15	Essex (IRE)	5	A. P. McCoy	Michael O'Brien (IRE)	9/1
13	17	Astonville (FR)	11	Tom Scudamore	Michael Scudamore (GB)	500/1
14	20	Turnium (FR)	10	James Davies	Michael Scudamore (GB)	500/1

- Abbreviations: nse = nose; nk = neck; hd = head; dist = distance; UR = unseated rider; PU = pulled up

== Winner's details ==
Further details of the winner, Hardy Eustace

- Sex: Gelding
- Foaled: 5 April 1997
- Country: Ireland
- Sire: Archway; Dam: Sterna Star (Corvaro)
- Owner: Laurence Byrne
- Breeder: Patrick Joyce
