= 2016 Champion Hurdle =

Horse race

86th Champion Hurdle
- Champion Hurdle
- Location: Cheltenham Racecourse
- Date: 15 March 2016
- Winning horse: Annie Power (IRE)
- Jockey: Ruby Walsh
- Trainer: Willie Mullins (IRE)

The 2016 Champion Hurdle was a horse race held at Cheltenham Racecourse on Tuesday 15 March 2016. It was the 86th running of the Champion Hurdle.

Twelve horses started the race, with eight British-trained horses matched against four Irish challengers. The winner of the race was Annie Power, an eight-year-old mare ridden by Ruby Walsh and trained in Ireland by Willie Mullins.

== The Runners ==
Almost all contenders from the previous Champion Hurdle were missing from this renewal, with the 2015 winner Faugheen forced out of the race after sustaining an injury a month earlier and his stablemate and runner-up on many occasions, Arctic Fire also sidelined a week later with a small injury. Following the news, Annie Power, who was in the same ownership as Faugheen was supplemented for the race and was sent off favourite on only her second start in over a year. Her trainer Willie Mullins was also represented by the six-time Grade 1 winner Nichols Canyon (the only horse at the time to have beaten Faugheen). The Grade 1 Fighting Fifth Hurdle winner Identity Thief was in the lineup and well fancied by the punters starting at single figure odds. The best of the English contenders were The New One— unlucky third in the 2014 renewal and fifth in 2015— and My Tent Or Yours —runner-up in the 2014 Champion Hurdle but absent from racing for almost 2 years. The latter was trained by Nicky Henderson who also had another four runners that included the 2015 Triumph Hurdle winner Peace and Co —who had not regained his form in the current season— and the runner-up from that race Top Notch who chased home Identity Thief at Newcastle. The outsiders were Sign of a Victory, Hargam, Sempre Medici(Red Mills Trial Hurdle), Camping Ground (Relkeel Hurdle) and Lil Rockefeller (National Spirit Hurdle).

== The Race ==
There was a fight for the lead in the first furlong with almost four in line trying obtain that spot but eventually Annie Power, who benefitted from a seven pounds mares allowance, settled in front at a good gallop and had The New One closely in behind with Nichols Canyon in third. From the back straight My Tent Or Yours began making ground and went in second on Annie Power's outside. Turning downhill the class horses began to draw clear from the field with Nichols Canyon, Annie Power and My Tent Or Yours all travelling well but in the home straight Annie Power found another gear and cleared from them approaching the final hurdle. She eventually won by four and a half lengths from My Tent Or Yours who was battling out with Nichols Canyon, only a head further back in third. The final time of the race was a new record almost breaking 3m 45s having the tailwind and the drying ground as help in achieving it.

The emotional scenes during the post-race interviews involved both the jockey Ruby Walsh and the owners who were in tears following Annie Power's previous unsuccessful attempts at the Cheltenham Festival in 2014 when she finished second in the World Hurdle and 2015 when she fell at the last hurdle when leading in the OLGB Mares' Hurdle.

== Race details ==
- Sponsor: Stan James
- Purse: £428,983.20 ; First prize: 248,302.00
- Going: Good to Soft
- Distance: 2 miles 87 yards
- Number of runners: 12
- Winner's time: 3m 45.10s

== Full result ==
Pos.	Marg.	Horse (bred)	Age	Jockey	Trainer (Country)	Odds
1		Annie Power (IRE)	8	Ruby Walsh	Willie Mullins (IRE)	5/2 fav
2	4½	My Tent Or Yours (IRE)	9	Barry Geraghty	Nicky Henderson (GB)	10/1
3	hd	Nichols Canyon (GB)	6	Paul Townend	Willie Mullins (IRE)	15/2
4	4	The New One (IRE)	8	Sam Twiston-Davies	Nigel Twiston-Davies (GB)	7/2
5	1	Top Notch (FR)	5	Daryl Jacob	Nicky Henderson (GB)	14/1
6	9	Identity Thief (IRE)	6	Bryan Cooper	Henry de Bromhead (IRE)	8/1
7	1¼	Lil Rockefeller (USA)	5	Trevor Whelan	Neil King (GB)	20/1
8	2¾	Sign of a Victory (IRE)	7	Andrew Tinkler	Nicky Henderson (GB)	66/1
9	nk	Camping Ground (FR)	6	Leighton Aspell	Robert Walford (GB)	16/1
10	28	Hargam (FR)	5	Mark Walsh	Nicky Henderson (GB)	16/1
PU		Sempre Medici (FR)	6	David Mullins	Willie Mullins (IRE)	16/1
PU		Peace and Co (FR)	5	Nico de Boinville	Nicky Henderson (GB)	16/1

- Abbreviations: nse = nose; nk = neck; hd = head; dist = distance; PU = pulled up
