= 2003 Champion Hurdle =

Horse race held at Cheltenham Racecourse

73rd Champion Hurdle
- Champion Hurdle
- Location: Cheltenham Racecourse
- Date: 11 March 2003
- Winning horse: Rooster Booster' (GB)
- Jockey: Richard Johnson
- Trainer: Philip Hobbs (GB)
- Owner: Terry Warner

The 2003 Champion Hurdle was a horse race held at Cheltenham Racecourse on Tuesday 11 March 2003. It was the 73rd running of the Champion Hurdle.

The race was won by Terry Warner's Rooster Booster, a nine-year-old gelding trained in Somerset by Philip Hobbs and ridden by Richard Johnson. His victory was the first in the race for his owner, trainer and jockey.

Rooster Booster started at odds of 9/2 and won by eleven lengths from Westender, with the favourite Rhinestone Cowboy in third. Hors La Loi III who refused to race and was left at the start, was the only previous winner of the race to line up for the race: other runners included Intersky Falcon, Landing Light and Like-A-Butterfly. Fourteen of the seventeen runners completed the course.

== Race details ==
- Sponsor: Smurfit
- Purse: £300,000; First prize: £174,000
- Going: Good
- Distance: 2 miles 110 yards
- Number of runners: 17
- Winner's time: 3m 54.70

== Full result ==
Pos.	Marg.	Horse (bred)	Age	Jockey	Trainer (Country)	Odds
1		Rooster Booster (GB)	9	Richard Johnson	Philip Hobbs (GB)	9/2
2	11	Westender (FR)	7	Rodi Greene	Martin Pipe (GB)	33/1
3	3	Rhinestone Cowboy (IRE)	7	Norman Williamson	Jonjo O'Neill (GB)	5/2 fav
4	¾	Self Defense (GB)	6	Barry Keniry	Emma Lavelle (GB)	100/1
5	2½	Intersky Falcon (GB)	6	Liam Cooper	Jonjo O'Neill (GB)	5/1
6	4	In Contrast (IRE)	6	Barry Geraghty	Philip Hobbs (GB)	25/1
7	2	Landing Light (IRE)	8	Mick Fitzgerald	Nicky Henderson (GB)	14/1
8	2	Holy Orders (IRE)	6	J. R. Barry	Willie Mullins (IRE)	100/1
9	5	Santenay (FR)	5	Ruby Walsh	Paul Nicholls (GB)	33/1
10	hd	Like-A-Butterfly (IRE)	9	Charlie Swan	Christy Roche (IRE)	13/2
11	4	Scottish Memories (IRE)	7	Paul Carberry	Noel Meade (IRE)	25/1
12	1	Marble Arch (GB)	7	Timmy Murphy	Hughie Morrison (GB)	25/1
13	16	Flame Creek (IRE)	7	Seamus Durack	Noel Chance (GB)	14/1
14	2½	Scolardy (IRE)	5	David Casey	Willie Mullins (IRE)	66/1
Fell		Copeland (GB)	8	A. P. McCoy	Martin Pipe (GB)	25/1
LFT		Hors La Loi III (FR)	8	Tony Dobbin	James Fanshawe (GB)	14/1
Fell		Iberus (GER)	5	Tom Scudamore	Martin Pipe (GB)	100/1

- Abbreviations: nse = nose; nk = neck; hd = head; dist = distance; UR = unseated rider; PU = pulled up; LFT = left at start

== Winner's details ==
Further details of the winner, Rooster Booster

- Sex: Gelding
- Foaled: 1 April 1994
- Country: United Kingdom
- Sire: Riverwise; Dam: Came Cottage (Nearly A Hand)
- Owner: Terry Warner
- Breeder: Mrs E Mitchell
