= 2018 Champion Hurdle =

Horse race

88th Champion Hurdle
- Champion Hurdle
- Location: Cheltenham Racecourse
- Date: 13 March 2018
- Winning horse: Buveur d'Air
- Jockey: Barry Geraghty
- Trainer: Nicky Henderson (GB)

The 2018 Champion Hurdle was a horse race held at Cheltenham Racecourse on Tuesday 13 March 2018. It was the 88th running of the Champion Hurdle.

Eleven horses started the race. The winner of the race for the second year in a row was Buveur d'Air, a seven year old French-bred British-trained racehorse ridden by Barry Geraghty and trained by Nicky Henderson.

== Race details ==
- Sponsor: Unibet
- Purse:
- Going: Going: Heavy, Soft in places
- Distance: 2 miles 87 yards
- Number of runners: 11
- Winner's time: 4m 05.00s

== Full result ==
Pos.	Marg.	Horse (bred)	Age	Jockey	Trainer (Country)	Odds
1		Buveur D'Air (FR)	7	Barry Geraghty	Nicky Henderson (GB)	4/6F
2	nk	Melon (GB)	6	Paul Townend	Willie Mullins (IRE)	7/1
3	3	Mick Jazz (FR)	7	Davy Russell	Gordon Elliott (IRE)	25/1
4	9	Identity Thief (IRE)	8	Sean Flanagan	Henry de Bromhead (IRE)	50/1
5	1 3/4	Elgin (GB)	6	Wayne Hutchinson	Alan King (GB)	12/1
6	3	Faugheen (IRE)	10	Ruby Walsh	Willie Mullins (IRE)	4/1
7	1/2	Wicklow Brave (GB)	9	Patrick Mullins (Note: amateur jockey)	Willie Mullins (IRE)	14/1
8	1 3/4	Ch'tibello (FR)	7	Harry Skelton	Dan Skelton (GB)	33/1
9	17	John Constable (IRE)	7	Leighton Aspell	Evan Williams (GB)	66/1
PU		Yorkhill (IRE)	8	David Mullins	Willie Mullins (IRE)	14/1
PU		Charli Parcs (FR)	5	Noel Fehily	Nicky Henderson (GB)	100/1

- Abbreviations: nse = nose; nk = neck; shd = short head; hd = head; dist = distance; PU = pulled up
