= 1991 Champion Hurdle =

62nd Champion Hurdle
- Champion Hurdle
- Location: Cheltenham Racecourse
- Date: 12 March 1991
- Winning horse: Morley Street (GB)
- Jockey: Jimmy Frost
- Trainer: Toby Balding (GB)
- Owner: Michael Jackson Bloodstock

The 1991 Champion Hurdle was a horse race held at Cheltenham Racecourse on Tuesday 12 March 1991. It was the 62nd running of the Champion Hurdle.

The winner was Michael Jackson's Morley Street, a seven-year-old chestnut gelding trained in Hampshire by Toby Balding and ridden by Jimmy Frost. Morley Street's victory was a first in the race for jockey and owner, and a second for the trainer, who had previously won with Beech Road in 1989.

Morley Street had established himself as a top class hurdler by winning the Mersey Novices' Hurdle in 1989 and the Aintree Hurdle in 1990, but had had mixed results when campaigned in steeplechases in the early part of the 1990/1991 National Hunt season. He re-entered the Champion Hurdle picture by winning the Berkshire Hurdle at Newbury on 1 March. Eleven days later he started the 4/1 favourite for the Champion Hurdle and won by one and a half lengths from the American-bred stallion Nomadic Way, with Ruling a head away in third place. The previous winner of the race to take part was Beech Road who finished in eighth place. Twenty-one of the twenty-four runners completed the course.

== Race details ==
- Sponsor: Smurfit
- Purse: £136,592; First prize: £81,790
- Going: Good to Soft
- Distance: 2 miles
- Number of runners: 24
- Winner's time: 3m 54.80

== Full result ==
| Pos. | Marg. | Horse (bred) | Age | Jockey | Trainer (Country) | Odds |
|---|---|---|---|---|---|---|
| 1 | | Morley Street (GB) | 7 | Jimmy Frost | Toby Balding (GB) | 4/1 fav |
| 2 | 1½ | Nomadic Way (USA) | 6 | Richard Dunwoody | Barry Hills (GB) | 9/1 |
| 3 | hd | Ruling (USA) | 5 | Peter Niven | Fulke Johnson Houghton (GB) | 50/1 |
| 4 | 5 | Mole Board (IRE) | 9 | Carl Llewellyn | Jim Old (GB) | 66/1 |
| 5 | 1½ | Voyage Sans Retour (FR) | 6 | Jonathon Lower | Martin Pipe (GB) | 33/1 |
| 6 | nk | Bradbury Star (GB) | 6 | Eamon Murphy | Josh Gifford (GB) | 66/1 |
| 7 | 6 | Wonder Man (FR) | 6 | Ben de Haan | Jenny Pitman (GB) | 50/1 |
| 8 | 3½ | Beech Road (GB) | 9 | Richard Guest | Toby Balding (GB) | 8/1 |
| 9 | 12 | Royal Derbi (GB) | 6 | Tommy Carmody | Neville Callaghan (GB) | 66/1 |
| 10 | ¾ | Deep Sensation (GB) | 6 | Declan Murphy | Josh Gifford (GB) | 50/1 |
| 11 | ½ | Jinxy Jack (IRE) | 7 | Neale Doughty | Gordon W. Richards (GB) | 16/1 |
| 12 | 2½ | Athy Spirit (IRE) | 6 | Tom Taaffe | W. Fennin (IRE) | 10/1 |
| 13 | ¾ | Rare Holiday (IRE) | 5 | Brendan Sheridan | Dermot Weld (IRE) | 50/1 |
| 14 | 1 | Vayrua (FR) | 6 | Mark Perrett | Guy Harwood (GB) | 33/1 |
| 15 | | Philosophos (IRE) | 5 | Nigel Coleman | John Baker (GB) | 250/1 |
| 16 | | Riverhead (USA) | 7 | Paul Holley | David Elsworth (GB) | 50/1 |
| 17 | | Danny Harrold (IRE) | 7 | Mark Pitman | Jenny Pitman (GB) | 16/1 |
| 18 | | Vestris Abu (IRE) | 5 | Charlie Swan | Jim Bolger (IRE) | 33/1 |
| 19 | | Major Inquiry (USA) | 5 | Graham Bradley | David Elsworth (GB) | 66/1 |
| 20 | | Sondrio (IRE) | 10 | Peter Scudamore | Martin Pipe (GB) | 10/1 |
| 21 | | The Illiad | 10 | P. McWilliams | Andrew Geraghty (IRE) | 11/2 |
| PU | | Sybillin (FR) | 5 | Mark Dwyer | Jimmy Fitzgerald (GB) | 20/1 |
| Fell | | Fidway (IRE) | 6 | Steve Smith Eccles | Tim Thomson Jones (GB) | 15/2 |
| Fell | | Black Humour (GB) | 7 | Jamie Osborne | Charlie Brooks (GB) | 20/1 |

- Abbreviations: nse = nose; nk = neck; hd = head; dist = distance; UR = unseated rider; PU = pulled up; LFT = left at start; SU = slipped up; BD = brought down

== Winner's details ==
Further details of the winner, Morley Street

- Sex: Gelding
- Foaled: 19 May 1984
- Country: United Kingdom
- Sire: Deep Run; Dam: High Board (High Line)
- Owner: Michael Jackson Bloodstock
- Breeder: M Parkhill
