= 2013 Champion Hurdle =

Horse race held at Cheltenham Racecourse

83rd Champion Hurdle
- Champion Hurdle
- Location: Cheltenham Racecourse
- Date: 10 March 2013
- Winning horse: Hurricane Fly (IRE)
- Jockey: Ruby Walsh
- Trainer: Willie Mullins (IRE)
- Owner: George Creighton & Rose Boyd

The 2013 Champion Hurdle was a horse race held at Cheltenham Racecourse on Tuesday 10 March 2013. It was the 83rd running of the Champion Hurdle.

The winner was George Creighton & Rose Boyd's Hurricane Fly, a nine-year-old gelding trained in Ireland by Willie Mullins and ridden by Ruby Walsh. The horse had previously won the race in 2011 with the same owner, trainer and rider, and became only the second horse to regain the title after the 1973 and 1975 champion Comedy of Errors.

Hurricane Fly won by two and a half lengths from Rock On Ruby, who had beaten him into fourth place in the 2012 running of the race. The 2010 winner Binocular finished fifth. Six of the nine runners completed the course.

== Race details ==
- Sponsor: Stan James
- Purse: £370,000; First prize: £227,800
- Going: Soft
- Distance: 2 miles 110 yards
- Number of runners: 9
- Winner's time: 3m 59.35

== Full result ==
Pos.	Marg.	Horse (bred)	Age	Jockey	Trainer (Country)	Odds
1		Hurricane Fly (IRE)	9	Ruby Walsh	Willie Mullins (IRE)	13/8 fav
2	2½	Rock On Ruby (IRE)	7	Noel Fehily	Harry Fry (GB)	11/2
3	1¾	Countrywide Flame (GB)	5	Dennis O'Regan	John Quinn (GB)	16/1
4	2½	Zarkandar (IRE)	6	Daryl Jacob	Paul Nicholls (GB)	7/2
5	21	Binocular (FR)	9	Tony McCoy	Nicky Henderson (GB)	10/1
6	4½	Khyber Kim (GB)	11	Paddy Brennan	Nicky Henderson (GB)	50/1
UR		Balder Success (FR)	5	Wayne Hutchinson	Alan King (GB)	100/1
Fell		Grandouet (FR)	6	Barry Geraghty	Nicky Henderson (GB)	13/2
PU		Cinders and Ashes (GB)	6	Jason Maguire	Donald McCain (GB)	16/1

- Abbreviations: nse = nose; nk = neck; hd = head; dist = distance; UR = unseated rider; PU = pulled up

== Winner's details ==
Further details of the winner, Hurricane Fly.

- Sex: Gelding
- Foaled: 5 April 2004
- Country: Ireland
- Sire: Montjeu; Dam: Scandisk (Kenmare)
- Owner: George Creighton & Rose Boyd
- Breeder: Agricola Del Parco
