= 1992 Champion Hurdle =

63rd Champion Hurdle
- Champion Hurdle
- Location: Cheltenham Racecourse
- Date: 10 March 1992
- Winning horse: Royal Gait (GB)
- Jockey: Graham McCourt
- Trainer: James Fanshawe (GB)
- Owner: Sheikh Mohammed

The 1992 Champion Hurdle was a horse race held at Cheltenham Racecourse on Tuesday 10 March 1992. It was the 63rd running of the Champion Hurdle.

The winner was Sheikh Mohammed's Royal Gait, a nine-year-old bay gelding trained in Suffolk by James Fanshawe and ridden by Graham McCourt. Royal Gait's victory was a first in the race for jockey and trainer, and a second for the owner who had won the 1990 running with Kribensis.

Royal Gait had been an outstanding stayer on the flat winning the Group One Prix du Cadran and Prix Royal Oak in 1987 and being controversially disqualified after finishing first in the 1988 Ascot Gold Cup. On what was only his fourth race over hurdles he started at odds of 6/1 and won the Champion Hurdle by half a length and a short head from Oh So Risky and Ruling. Two previous winners of the race, Morley Street and Kribensis took part: Morley Street was made the 2/1 favourite and finished sixth whilst Kribensis finished last. The second favourite Granville Again fell at the penultimate hurdle. Fourteen of the sixteen runners completed the course.

== Race details ==
- Sponsor: Smurfit
- Purse: £133,661; First prize: £80,065
- Going: Good
- Distance: 2 miles
- Number of runners: 16
- Winner's time: 3m 57.40

== Full result ==
| Pos. | Marg. | Horse (bred) | Age | Jockey | Trainer (Country) | Odds |
|---|---|---|---|---|---|---|
| 1 | | Royal Gait (GB) | 9 | Graham McCourt | James Fanshawe (GB) | 6/1 |
| 2 | ½ | Oh So Risky (GB) | 5 | Paul Holley | David Elsworth (GB) | 20/1 |
| 3 | shd | Ruling (USA) | 6 | Peter Niven | Fulke Johnson Houghton (GB) | 20/1 |
| 4 | 6 | Fidway (IRE) | 7 | Hywel Davies | Tim Thomson Jones (GB) | 7/1 |
| 5 | 1 | Bank View (GB) | 7 | M. Duffy | Nigel Tinkler (GB) | 50/1 |
| 6 | shd | Morley Street (GB) | 8 | Jimmy Frost | Toby Balding (GB) | 2/1 fav |
| 7 | ¾ | Chirkpar (GB) | 5 | L. Cusack | Jim Bolger (IRE) | 20/1 |
| 8 | 1½ | Propero (GB) | 7 | Declan Murphy | Josh Gifford (GB) | 150/1 |
| 9 | 3½ | Minorettes Girl (GB) | 7 | Adrian Maguire | Paddy Mullins (IRE) | 16/1 |
| 10 | 2 | Winnie The Witch | 8 | David Bridgwater | Ken Bridgwater (GB) | 50/1 |
| 11 | 2 | Royal Derbi (GB) | 7 | Charlie Swan | Neville Callaghan (GB) | 50/1 |
| 12 | 10 | Mardood (GB) | 7 | Susan Kersey | T. Kersey (GB) | 500/1 |
| 13 | 8 | Shu Fly (NZ) | 8 | Jacqui Oliver | Sally Oliver (GB) | 200/1 |
| 14 | | Kribensis (GB) | 8 | Richard Dunwoody | Michael Stoute (GB) | 12/1 |
| UR | | Valiant Boy (USA) | 6 | S. Lyons | S. Kettlewell (GB) | 100/1 |
| Fell | | Granville Again (GB) | 6 | Peter Scudamore | Martin Pipe (GB) | 9/2 |

- Abbreviations: nse = nose; nk = neck; hd = head; dist = distance; UR = unseated rider; PU = pulled up; LFT = left at start; SU = slipped up; BD = brought down

== Winner's details ==
Further details of the winner, Royal Gait

- Sex: Gelding
- Foaled: 12 April 1983
- Country: United Kingdom
- Sire: Gunner B; Dam: High Gait (High Top)
- Owner: Sheikh Mohammed
- Breeder: Ian H Wills
