= 2023 Champion Hurdle =

93rd Champion Hurdle
- Champion Hurdle
- Location: Cheltenham Racecourse
- Date: 14 March 2023
- Winning horse: Constitution Hill
- Jockey: Nico de Boinville
- Trainer: Nicky Henderson

The 2023 Champion Hurdle was a horse race held at Cheltenham Racecourse on Tuesday 14 March 2023. It was the 93rd running of the Champion Hurdle.

The race was won by 4/11 favourite Constitution Hill, ridden by Nico de Boinville and trained by Nicky Henderson.

== Race details ==
- Sponsor: Unibet
- Purse:
- Going:Soft
- Distance:2 miles 87 yards
- Number of runners: 7
- Winner's time: 3:59.38
