= Macs Joy =

Irish-bred Thoroughbred racehorse

- Sire: Religiously (USA)
- Grandsire: Alleged (USA)
- Dam: Snob's Supreme (IRE)
- Damsire: Supreme Leader (GB)
- Sex: Gelding
- Foaled: 2 April 1999
- Country: Ireland
- Colour: Bay
- Breeder: Northern Breeders Association
- Owner: Mac's J Racing Syndicate
- Trainer: Jessica Harrington
- Record: 31: 9-9-8
- Earnings: £528,853

Major wins
- Swinton Handicap Hurdle (2004); Allied Irish Bank Hurdle (2004); December Festival Hurdle (2004); Irish Champion Hurdle (2005); Red Mills Trial Hurdle (2006); Punchestown Champion Hurdle (2006)

Macs Joy (his name was written without an apostrophe) was an Irish Thoroughbred racehorse who won several important hurdle races including three at Grade I level between 2004 and 2006. He was also known for his long series of races against the Champion Hurdler Brave Inca. He was put down after breaking a leg in a race at Cheltenham in December 2007.

== Background ==
Macs Joy was the best horse sired by the American-bred stallion Religiously. He was trained throughout his career by Jessica Harrington (officially Mrs John Harrington) near Moone, County Kildare. His most regular jockey was Barry Geraghty who rode him in twenty-two of his thirty-one races.

== Racing career ==
=== 2003/4 season ===
Macs Joy began his career by running in two National Hunt flat races in June 2003. He won on his debut at Tralee beating nineteen opponents and finished third in a similar event at Tipperary three weeks later.

When the jumping season proper began in autumn, Macs Joy was campaigned as a Novice Hurdler, running five times in minor events before Christmas. He showed some promise by winning a small race at Downpatrick and finishing second to the future Cheltenham Gold Cup winner War of Attrition at Navan.

After Christmas he was moved out of Novice company, racing instead in Handicap races against more experienced opposition. He made rapid improvement, with his official handicap rating rising from 111 to 142 in the next five months. After a second place in the valuable Pierse Hurdle in January he finished first in a handicap at Leopardstown only to be disqualified for interfering with the runner-up when drifting left in the closing stages. In April Macs Joy recorded his first notable win, carrying 11–0 to victory in the Menolly Homes Handicap Hurdle at Fairyhouse, after which he was sent to England for the first time to compete in the Swinton Handicap Hurdle at Haydock. Held up in the early stages he made progress to lead approaching the last hurdle and ran on strongly to win by two and a half lengths. According to the Racing Post he "oozed class" and was "one to follow".

=== 2004/5 season ===
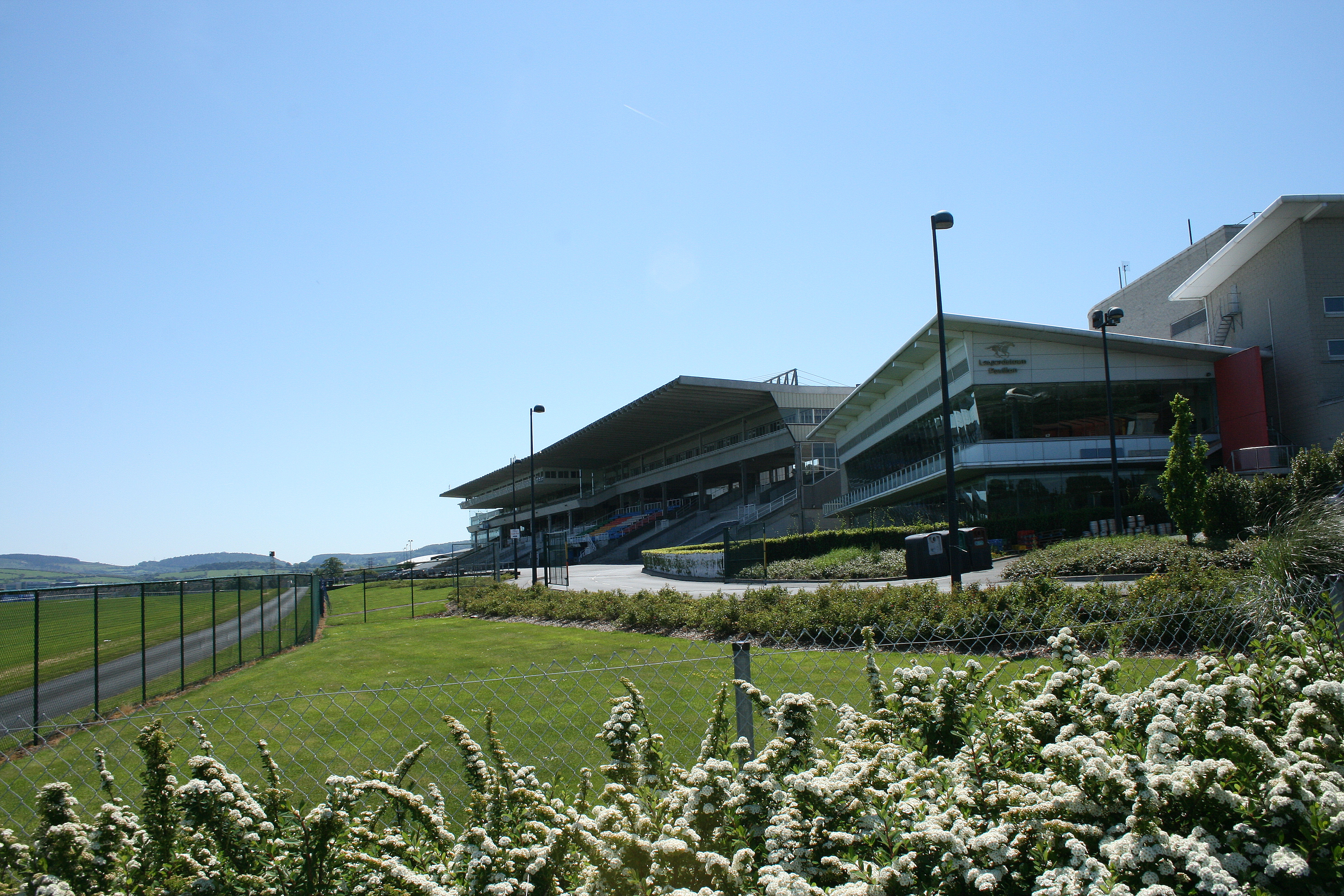
Leopardstown Racecourse. The site of Macs Joy's two Grade I wins in 2004/5

After warming up with third place in a flat race Macs Joy won the Anglo Irish Bank Hurdle at Down Royal, beating the Supreme Novices' Hurdle winner Brave Inca "comfortably" This was to be the first of twelve meetings between the two horses over the next eighteen months (the final score was 7–5 in Brave Inca's favour). Although he was carrying ten pounds less than the runner-up, his performance attracted the attention of the bookmakers, who offered him at odds of 14-1 for the Champion Hurdle immediately after the race.

After a third place to Harchibald in the Morgiana Hurdle in November he was sent to Leopardstown for the Grade I December Festival Hurdle. He produced his best performance to date, taking the lead before the last hurdle and going clear to beat Brave Inca by three lengths, with the Champion Hurdler Hardy Eustace two lengths further back in third. Macs Joy confirmed his superiority over Brave Inca and Hardy Eustace in the Irish Champion Hurdle at Leopardstown, and although the margins were much closer on this occasion, with the three horses crossing the line almost as one, he had established himself as a leading contender for the Champion Hurdle at the Cheltenham Festival. Geraghty was confident, saying,"That is as good a Champion Hurdle trial you will see in a long time.".

At Cheltenham, Macs Joy went off third favourite at odds of 7–1, but after challenging two hurdles from the finish, he could make no further impression and came home fifth to Hardy Eustace, beaten five lengths. He moved up to two and a half miles at Aintree where he finished fourth to Al Eile in the Aintree Hurdle, and ended his season with a third place to Brave Inca and Harchibald at Punchestown.

=== 2005/6 season ===
Macs Joy took some time to find his form in the autumn. He finished last of five to Brave Inca in the Morgiana Hurdle, and a remote fourth to the same horse at the Punchestown December Festival. In the new year he began to improve, getting to within a length of Brave Inca when second in the Irish Champion Hurdle, before recording his first win for over a year in the Red Mills Trial Hurdle. Starting at odds-on, he was never under pressure and was eased down in the closing stages to beat the staying mare Asian Maze by four and a half lengths.

He returned to Cheltenham for the Championship, in which his improving form saw him sent off 13-2 third favourite behind Brave Inca (whose rider Tony McCoy had referred to Macs Joy as his "main danger") and Hardy Eustace, who was seeking his third consecutive win in the race. The three Irish horses dominated the race, but although Macs Joy was always in touch and challenged strongly in the closing stages, he was unable to catch Brave Inca, who beat him by a length, with Hardy Eustace third.

On his final start of the season, Macs Joy produced his best performance. The Punchestown Champion Hurdle attracted only four runners, but they included the first three from Cheltenham. Macs Joy tracked Hardy Eustace in the early stages before moving smoothly into the lead and pulling away to win by an "impressive" four lengths from Brave Inca. Jessica Harrington acknowledged that the faster ground and slower earlier pace had allowed had enabled Macs Joy to use his greater natural speed to his advantage. "We got him at last" she said, referring to Brave Inca.

=== 2006/7 season ===
Macs Joy's return to the racecourse was delayed by a series of "niggly muscle injuries" and he did not run again until January 2007. He was quite promising when taking third to Hardy Eustace in the Irish Champion Hurdle, but was disappointing when beaten at odds-on in the Red Mills Trial Hurdle.

He was still being prepared for a third attempt at the Champion Hurdle, but was forced out by a recurrence of his muscle problems four days before the race. He was re-routed to the Punchestown Festival in April, and after a warm up race on the flat, was made favourite for the Punchestown Champion Hurdle. Macs Joy overtook and then pulled clear of his main rival Hardy Eustace, but was caught in the closing stages and beaten a neck by the 20-1 outsider Silent Oscar.

== Death ==
Macs Joy began the 2007/2008 season with a third place in the Morgiana Hurdle before being sent to England for the Grade II Boylesports.com International Hurdle at Cheltenham on 15 December 2007. Macs Joy broke down with a serious leg injury approaching the third last hurdle. The injury, which proved to be a broken tibia, was untreatable and he was quickly euthanized. It was the only time that he had failed to complete the course in a race.

Jessica Harrington praised Macs Joy saying

He wasn't very big, but he was a real fighter. He was a little tiger and he always tried his heart out. There'll be a big gap in the yard now.

Barry Geraghty called him "a great horse... he'll be sadly missed"

== Assessment ==
Macs Joy's highest official rating was 167, after his win in the 2006 Punchestown Champion Hurdle. This was equal to the highest rating achieved by the Champion Hurdler Brave Inca, and higher than the best rating achieved by the subsequent champions Sublimity (166), Punjabi (164) and Katchit (166).

== Pedigree ==
Pedigree of Macs Joy (IRE), bay gelding, 1999
Sire Religiously (USA) 1984	Alleged; 1974	Hoist The Flag	Tom Rolfe
Sire Religiously (USA) 1984	Alleged; 1974	Hoist The Flag	Wavy Navy
Sire Religiously (USA) 1984	Alleged; 1974	Princess Pout	Prince John
Sire Religiously (USA) 1984	Alleged; 1974	Princess Pout	Dedicated Lady
Sire Religiously (USA) 1984	Pas de Nom; 1968	Admiral's Voyage	Crafty Admiral
Sire Religiously (USA) 1984	Pas de Nom; 1968	Admiral's Voyage	Olympia Lou
Sire Religiously (USA) 1984	Pas de Nom; 1968	Petitioner	Petition
Sire Religiously (USA) 1984	Pas de Nom; 1968	Petitioner	Steady Aim
Dam Snob's Supreme (IRE) 1991	Supreme Leader; 1982	Bustino	Busted
Dam Snob's Supreme (IRE) 1991	Supreme Leader; 1982	Bustino	Ship Yard
Dam Snob's Supreme (IRE) 1991	Supreme Leader; 1982	Princess Zena	Habitat
Dam Snob's Supreme (IRE) 1991	Supreme Leader; 1982	Princess Zena	Guiding Light
Dam Snob's Supreme (IRE) 1991	Boherash Forest; 1982	Proverb	Reliance
Dam Snob's Supreme (IRE) 1991	Boherash Forest; 1982	Proverb	Causerie
Dam Snob's Supreme (IRE) 1991	Boherash Forest; 1982	In The Forest	Crowded Room
Dam Snob's Supreme (IRE) 1991	Boherash Forest; 1982	In The Forest	In The Clouds (Family: 6-f)
