= 1993 Champion Hurdle =

64th Champion Hurdle
- Champion Hurdle
- Location: Cheltenham Racecourse
- Date: 16 March 1993
- Winning horse: Granville Again (GB)
- Jockey: Peter Scudamore
- Trainer: Martin Pipe (GB)
- Owner: Eric Scarth

The 1993 Champion Hurdle was a horse race held at Cheltenham Racecourse on Tuesday 16 March 1993. It was the 64th running of the Champion Hurdle.

The winner was Eric Scarth's Granville Again, a seven-year-old chestnut gelding trained in Devon by Martin Pipe and ridden by Peter Scudamore. Granville Again's victory was a first in the race for trainer and owner and a second for Scudamore, who had ridden Celtic Shot to victory in 1988. Granville Again was a full brother to Morley Street, who had won the race in 1991.

Granville Again was a non-Thoroughbred gelding, who had been strongly fancied for the 1992 running of the race, but fell at the second last hurdle. Starting at odds of 13/2 he won the Champion Hurdle by a length from the 50/1 outsider Royal Derbi with Halkopous in third place. Two previous winners of the race, Morley Street and Kribensis took part and finished eleventh and twelfth respectively. Seventeen of the eighteen runners completed the course.

== Race details ==
- Sponsor: Smurfit
- Purse: £141,590; First prize: £84,734
- Going: Good to Firm
- Distance: 2 miles 110 yards
- Number of runners: 18
- Winner's time: 3m 51.40

== Full result ==
Pos.	Marg.	Horse (bred)	Age	Jockey	Trainer (Country)	Odds
1		Granville Again (GB)	7	Peter Scudamore	Martin Pipe (GB)	13/2
2	1	Royal Derbi (GB)	8	Mark Perrett	Neville Callaghan (GB)	50/1
3	2½	Halkopous (GB)	7	Adrian Maguire	Mark Tompkins (GB)	9/1
4	3	King Credo (GB)	8	Hywel Davies	Steve Woodman (GB)	20/1
5	2	Oh So Risky (GB)	6	Paul Holley	David Elsworth (GB)	10/1
6	hd	Vintage Crop (GB)	6	Brendan Sheridan	Dermot Weld (IRE)	9/1
7	½	Flakey Dove (GB)	7	Carl Llewellyn	Richard Price (GB)	50/1
8	nk	Flown (GB)	6	Richard Dunwoody	Nicky Henderson (GB)	7/2 fav
9	2	Jinxy Jack (IRE)	9	Neale Doughty	Gordon W. Richards (GB)	25/1
10	3	Eyelid	7	Charlie Swan	Michael Purcell (IRE)	50/1
11	nk	Kribensis (GB)	9	Declan Murphy	Michael Stoute (GB)	16/1
12	2	Morley Street (GB)	9	Graham Bradley	Toby Balding (GB)	20/1
13	3½	Coulton (GB)	6	Mark Dwyer	Mick Easterby (GB)	9/1
14	7	Athy Spirit (IRE)	8	K. O'Brien	W. Fennin (IRE)	200/1
15	5	Duke of Monmouth (USA)	5	Graham McCourt	Simon Sherwood (GB)	25/1
16	7	Valfinet (FR)	6	Jonothon Lower	Martin Pipe (GB)	16/1
17		Staunch Friend (USA)	5	Jamie Osborne	Mark Tompkins (GB)	20/1
PU		Ruling (USA)	7	Peter Niven	Fulke Johnson Houghton (GB)	14/1

- Abbreviations: nse = nose; nk = neck; hd = head; dist = distance; UR = unseated rider; PU = pulled up; LFT = left at start; SU = slipped up; BD = brought down

== Winner's details ==
Further details of the winner, Granville Again

- Sex: Gelding
- Foaled: 20 June 1986
- Country: United Kingdom
- Sire: Deep Run; Dam: High Board (High Line)
- Owner: Eric Scarth
- Breeder: M. Parkhill
