= 2004 Champion Hurdle =

74th Champion Hurdle
- Champion Hurdle
- Location: Cheltenham Racecourse
- Date: 16 March 2004
- Winning horse: Hardy Eustace (IRE)
- Jockey: Conor O'Dwyer
- Trainer: Dessie Hughes (IRE)
- Owner: Laurence Byrne

The 2004 Champion Hurdle was a horse race held at Cheltenham Racecourse on Tuesday 16 March 2004. It was the 74th running of the Champion Hurdle.

The race was won by Laurence Byrne's Hardy Eustace, a seven-year-old gelding trained in Ireland by Dessie Hughes and ridden by Conor O'Dwyer. His victory was the first in the race for his owner, trainer and jockey.

Hardy Eustace started a 33/1 outsider and led throughout to win by five lengths from Rooster Booster who had won the race in the previous year, with Intersky Falcon in third. Thirteen of the fourteen runners completed the course.

== Race details ==
- Sponsor: Smurfit
- Purse: £300,000; First prize: £174,000
- Going: Good
- Distance: 2 miles 110 yards
- Number of runners: 14
- Winner's time: 3m 54.50

== Full result ==
Pos.	Marg.	Horse (bred)	Age	Jockey	Trainer (Country)	Odds
1		Hardy Eustace (IRE)	7	Conor O'Dwyer	Dessie Hughes (IRE)	33/1
2	5	Rooster Booster (GB)	10	Richard Johnson	Philip Hobbs (GB)	11/8 fav
3	4	Intersky Falcon (GB)	7	Liam Cooper	Jonjo O'Neill (GB)	8/1
4	1¼	Foreman (GER)	6	Thierry Doumen	Thierry Doumen (FR)	10/1
5	nk	Westender (FR)	8	A. P. McCoy	Martin Pipe (GB)	16/1
6	3	Fota Island (IRE)	8	David Casey	Mouse Morris (IRE)	50/1
7	6	Golden Cross (IRE)	5	Paul Carberry	Michael Halford (IRE)	40/1
8	2½	Rigmarole (GB)	6	Ruby Walsh	Paul Nicholls (GB)	4/1
9	4	Specular (AUS)	8	Barry Geraghty	Jonjo O'Neill (GB)	14/1
10	shd	Self Defense (GB)	7	Barry Keniry	Emma Lavelle (GB)	66/1
11	¾	Hasty Prince (GB)	6	Tony Dobbin	Jonjo O'Neill (GB)	50/1
12	1	Limerick Boy (GER)	6	Sam Thomas	Venetia Williams (GB)	16/1
13	1½	Davenport Milenium (IRE)	8	Timmy Murphy	Willie Mullins (IRE)	25/1
PU		Geos (FR)	9	Mick Fitzgerald	Nicky Henderson (GB)	20/1

- Abbreviations: nse = nose; nk = neck; hd = head; dist = distance; UR = unseated rider; PU = pulled up

== Winner's details ==
Further details of the winner, Hardy Eustace

- Sex: Gelding
- Foaled: 5 April 1997
- Country: Ireland
- Sire: Archway; Dam: Sterna Star (Corvaro)
- Owner: Laurence Byrne
- Breeder: Patrick Joyce
