= 2024 Champion Hurdle =

Horse race at Cheltenham Racecourse, England

94th Champion Hurdle
- Champion Hurdle
- Location: Cheltenham Racecourse
- Date: 12 March 2024
- Winning horse: State Man
- Jockey: Paul Townend
- Trainer: Willie Mullins

The 2024 Champion Hurdle was a horse race held at Cheltenham Racecourse on Tuesday 12 March 2024. It was the 94th running of the Champion Hurdle.

The race was won by 2/5 favourite State Man, ridden by Paul Townend and trained by Willie Mullins.

== Race details ==
- Sponsor: Unibet
- Purse:
- Going:
- Distance:2 miles 87 yards
- Number of runners: 12
- Winner's time:4:13.88
