= Epatante =

French-bred racehorse

- Sire: No Risk At All
- Grandsire: My Risk
- Dam: Kadjara
- Damsire: Silver Rainbow
- Sex: Mare
- Foaled: 27 February 2014
- Country: France
- Colour: Bay
- Breeder: Francois-Xavier & Anne Doulce Lefeuvre
- Owner: Anne Doulce Lefeuvre; J. P. McManus
- Trainer: A Lefeuvre; Nicky Henderson
- Record: 14: 9-2-2
- Earnings: £716,578

Major wins
- Prix Jacques de Vienne (2017); Ladbrokes Intermediate Hurdle (2019); Christmas Hurdle (2019,2021); Champion Hurdle (2020); Fighting Fifth Hurdle (2020, 2021); Aintree Hurdle (2022); Yorkshire Rose Mares' Hurdle (2023)

Epatante (foaled 27 February 2014) is a French-bred AQPS racehorse best known for her performances in Hurdle races. After winning two of her three races in her native country, she was transferred to race in England and showed further promise by winning two of her three starts in the 2018/2019 National Hunt season. In the following season she emerged as a top-class performer, winning the Ladbrokes Intermediate Hurdle, Christmas Hurdle and Champion Hurdle

== Background ==
Epatante is a bay mare with no white markings bred in France by Francois-Xavier & Anne Doulce Lefeuvre. She initially raced in France in the ownership of Mme Lefeuvre.

Her sire, the French stallion No Risk At All, was a successful racehorse whose victories included La Coupe and the Grand Prix de Vichy-Auvergne. Epatante's dam Kadjara was not a Thoroughbred as her maternal grandsire Useful was descended from a mare whose ancestors do not appear in the General Stud Book. On her dam's side she was descendant of the British broodmare Miss Erene (foaled in 1931), making her a distant relative of Raintrap and Sunshack.

== Racing career ==
=== 2017: three-year-old season ===
On her racecourse debut, Epatante finished second to Extra Noire in a race for AQPS horses over 2500 metres at Saint-Malo on 23 August. On 12 September on very soft ground at Le Lion-d'Angers she recorded her first success as she won the Prix Yann Poirier "easily" by six lengths. In the Prix Jacques de Vienne at Saint-Cloud Racecourse she started at odds of 4.8/1 and recorded another easy win, coming home three lengths clear of her opponents despite eased down in the closing stages.

=== 2018/2019 National Hunt season ===
In 2018 Epatante was bought by J. P. McManus and was sent to England where she was trained by Nicky Henderson. She made her first appearance for her new connections on 12 November when she started 8/15 favourite for a Novice Hurdle over two miles at Kempton Park Racecourse. Ridden by Barry Geraghty, who became her regular jockey, she took the lead at the penultimate flight of hurdles and won "easily" by three and a half lengths. On 22 February she contested a Novice Hurdle confined to mares at Exeter Racecourse and won "very easily" at odds of 1/6. She made her first appearance at the Cheltenham Festival on 14 March when she started favourite for the Grade 2 Dawn Run Mares' Novices' Hurdle but ran poorly and came home ninth behind the Irish-trained Eglantine du Seuil.

=== 2019/2020 National Hunt season ===
Aidan Coleman took the ride when Epatante began her third campaign by carrying 160 pounds in the Listed Ladbrokes "Where The Nation Plays" Intermediate Hurdle at Newbury Racecourse on 30 November. Starting the 3/1 favourite in an eleven-runner field she took the lead approaching the final flight of hurdles and drew away on the run-in to win by six lengths from her stablemate French Crusader. The mare was then moved up to Grade 1 Christmas Hurdle at Kempton on 26 December and started the 2/1 joint-favourite alongside her stablemate Fusil Raffles, the winner of the Champion Four Year Old Hurdle. The other runners included Verdana Blue (winner of the race in 2018), Ch'tibello (County Hurdle), Silver Streak (Swinton Handicap Hurdle) and Ballyandy (Champion Bumper). Epatante raced in mid-division before taking the lead after the second-last obstacle and accelerating away from her rivals to win by five lengths from Silver Streak. After the race Nicky Henderson said "She was impressive, wasn't she? I've even got to admit it myself, it was very good... She's lovely, has a great temperament and has a good attitude... She's much more mature now, mentally, and she travelled like a dream."

At Cheltenham on 10 March Epatante started the 2/1 favourite for the 90th running of the Champion Hurdle. Her fifteen opponents included Cilaos Emery (Hilly Way Chase), Darver Star, Supasundae (Aintree Hurdle), Pentland Hills (Triumph Hurdle), Sharjah (Matheson Hurdle), Silver Streak, Fusil Raffles, Petit Mouchoir (Irish Champion Hurdle), Cornerstone Lad (Fighting Fifth Hurdle) and Ballyandy. Epatante was in contention from the start as Petit Mouchoir set the pace. Darver Star briefly gained the advantage approaching the final flight but the mare jumped past him at the last obstacle and stayed on well in the closing stages to win by three lengths from Sharjah.

== Pedigree ==
Pedigree of Epatante (FR), bay mare, 2014
Sire No Risk At All (FR) 2007	My Risk (FR); 1999	Take Risks	Highest Honor
Sire No Risk At All (FR) 2007	My Risk (FR); 1999	Take Risks	Baino Bluff (GB)
Sire No Risk At All (FR) 2007	My Risk (FR); 1999	Miss Pat	Vacarme (USA)
Sire No Risk At All (FR) 2007	My Risk (FR); 1999	Miss Pat	Miss Mood
Sire No Risk At All (FR) 2007	Newness (IRE); 1988	Simply Great (FR)	Mill Reef (USA)
Sire No Risk At All (FR) 2007	Newness (IRE); 1988	Simply Great (FR)	Seneca
Sire No Risk At All (FR) 2007	Newness (IRE); 1988	Neomenie	Rheffic (FR)
Sire No Risk At All (FR) 2007	Newness (IRE); 1988	Neomenie	Nordenburg (GER)
Dam Kadjara (FR) 1998	Silver Rainbow (GB); 1988	Rainbow Quest (USA)	Blushing Groom (FR)
Dam Kadjara (FR) 1998	Silver Rainbow (GB); 1988	Rainbow Quest (USA)	I Will Follow
Dam Kadjara (FR) 1998	Silver Rainbow (GB); 1988	Ayrenne (FR)	Green Dancer (USA)
Dam Kadjara (FR) 1998	Silver Rainbow (GB); 1988	Ayrenne (FR)	Americaine
Dam Kadjara (FR) 1998	Evavia (FR); 1992	Useful AQPS	Vorias (USA)
Dam Kadjara (FR) 1998	Evavia (FR); 1992	Useful AQPS	Etoile du Berger AQPS
Dam Kadjara (FR) 1998	Evavia (FR); 1992	All Grey	New Chapter (GB)
Dam Kadjara (FR) 1998	Evavia (FR); 1992	All Grey	All Commander (Family: 1-n)
