= Red Mills Trial Hurdle =

Hurdle horse race in Ireland

Red Mills Trial Hurdle
2026
| Storm Heart | Workahead | Farren Glory |

Previous years
2025
Kitzbuhel | Break My Soul | Sir Gerhard
2024
Lantry Lady | What's Up Darling | Doyen Ta Win
2023
Fil Dor | Sharjah | Doctor Bravo
2022
Teahupoo | Darasso | Quilixios
2021
Jason The Militant | Petit Mouchoir | Darasso

2020-2011
2020
Cilaos Emery | Darasso | Mengli Khan
2019
Darasso | Forge Meadow | Rashaan
2018
Forge Meadow | Identity Thief | Lagostovegas
2017
Tombstone | Jezki | Rashaan
2016
Sempre Medici | Bentelimar | Rory O'Moore
2015
Kitten Rock | Thunder Zone | Tiger Roll
2014
Un De Sceaux | Midnight Game | Chicago
2013
So Young | Zaidpour | Rory O'Moore
2012
Zaidpour | Kalann | Darwins Fox
2011
Dunguib | Luska Lad | Gimli's Rock

2010-2001
2010
Luska Lad | Jumbo Rio | Noble Prince
2009
Solwhit | Jazz Messenger | Beau Michael
2008
Catch Me | Jazz Messenger | Larkwing
2007
Newmill | Macs Joy | Laetitia
2006
Macs Joy | Asian Maze | Ground Ball
2005
Hardy Eustace | L'Antartique | Ansar
2004
Georges Girl | Hardy Eustace | Bob Justice
2003
Sacundai | Liss A Paoraigh | Calladine
2002
Fadoudal Du Cochet | Kadoun | Bob Justice
2001
Youlneverwalkalone | Goldstreet | Dorans Pride

2000-1990
2000
Balla Sola | Theatreworld | Nomadic
1999
Nomadic | Limestone Lad | Theatreworld
1998
Theatreworld | Noble Thyne | Moscow Express
1997
Theatreworld | Guest Performance | Lady Daisy
1996
Danoli | Tiananmen Square | Holders Hill
1994
Arctic Weather | Novello Allegro | Shankorak
1993
Belvederian | Princess Casilia | Sullane River
1992
Oh What | Out Of Court | Gypsy Lass
1991
Randaka | For William | Chattering
1990
Miriam's Fancy | Dozing Bull | Dirty Diana

The Red Mills Trial Hurdle is a Grade 3 National Hunt hurdle race in Ireland. It is run at Gowran Park in February, over a distance of about 2 miles and during the race there are nine hurdles to be jumped. It was downgraded from Grade 2 to Grade 3 in 2017.

== Records ==
Most successful horse since 1990 (2 wins):

- Theatreworld – 1997,1998

Leading jockey since 1990 (4 wins):

- Conor O'Dwyer – Balla Sola (2000), Youlneverwalkalone (2001), Fadoudal Du Cochet (2002), Hardy Eustace (2005)
- Paul Townend - Zaidpour (2012),Cilaos Emery (2020), Kitzbuhel (2025), Storm Heart (2026)

Leading trainer since 1990 (8 wins):

- Willie Mullins - Balla Sola (2000), Zaidpour (2012), So Young (2013), Un de Sceaux (2014), Sempre Medici (2016), Cilaos Emery (2020), Kitzbuhel (2025), Storm Heart (2026)

== Winners since 1990 ==
| Year | Winner | Jockey | Trainer |
|---|---|---|---|
| 1990 | Miriam's Fancy | Philip Fenton (Note: amateur jockey) | Edward O'Grady |
| 1991 | Randaka | T Mullins | P Mullins |
| 1993 | Belvederian | L P Cusack | Mouse Morris |
| 1994 | Arctic Weather | K L O'Brien | Michael O'Brien |
| 1996 | Danoli | Tom Treacy | Thomas Treacy |
| 1997 | Theatreworld | Charlie Swan | Aidan O'Brien |
| 1998 | Theatreworld | Charlie Swan | Aidan O'Brien |
| 1999 | Nomadic | Paul Carberry | Noel Meade |
| 2000 | Balla Sola | Conor O'Dwyer | Willie Mullins |
| 2001 | Youlneverwalkalone | Conor O'Dwyer | Christy Roche |
| 2002 | Fadoudal Du Cochet | Conor O'Dwyer | Arthur Moore |
| 2003 | Sacundai | Charlie Swan | Edward O'Grady |
| 2004 | Georges Girl | Francis Flood | Francis Flood |
| 2005 | Hardy Eustace | Conor O'Dwyer | Dessie Hughes |
| 2006 | Macs Joy | Barry Geraghty | Jessica Harrington |
| 2007 | Newmill | Andrew McNamara | John Joseph Murphy |
| 2008 | Catch Me | Andrew McNamara | Edward O'Grady |
| 2009 | Solwhit | Davy Russell | Charles Byrnes |
| 2010 | Luska Lad | Davy Russell | John Hanlon |
| 2011 | Dunguib | Brian O'Connell | Philip Fenton |
| 2012 | Zaidpour | Paul Townend | Willie Mullins |
| 2013 | So Young | David Casey | Willie Mullins |
| 2014 | Un de Sceaux | Ruby Walsh | Willie Mullins |
| 2015 | Kitten Rock | Mark Walsh | Edward O'Grady |
| 2016 | Sempre Medici | Ruby Walsh | Willie Mullins |
| 2017 | Tombstone | Bryan Cooper | Gordon Elliott |
| 2018 | Forge Meadow | Robbie Power | Jessica Harrington |
| 2019 | Darasso | Barry Geraghty | Joseph O'Brien |
| 2020 | Cilaos Emery | Paul Townend | Willie Mullins |
| 2021 | Jason The Militant (Note: The 2021 race was run at Fairyhouse after the original Gowran Park fixture was abandoned) | Rachael Blackmore | Henry De Bromhead |
| 2022 | Teahupoo | Robbie Power | Gordon Elliott |
| 2023 | Fil Dor | Jordan Gainford | Gordon Elliott |
| 2024 | Lantry Lady | Rachael Blackmore | Henry De Bromhead |
| 2025 | Kitzbuhel | Paul Townend | Willie Mullins |
| 2026 | Storm Heart | Paul Townend | Willie Mullins |

== See also ==
- Horse racing in Ireland
- List of Irish National Hunt races
