= Raymond Tooth =

English lawyer

Raymond Clive Tooth is a matrimonial and family law lawyer and racehorse owner in the United Kingdom. He represents the wives of male celebrities in high-profile divorces.

== Education and career ==
Tooth attended several schools before earning his law degree, including Dragon School in Oxford, Kings School in Canterbury and University College in Oxford. In 1966, Tooth became a qualified lawyer. Since then, he has worked for several law firms, such as A&G Tooth (1966–70), Payne Hicks Beach (1970–77) and Colombotti Alkin (1977–82). In 1986 Tooth and other international family lawyers, including Fiona Shackleton, co-founded the International Academy of Matrimonial Lawyers, an invitation only organisation which now consists of over 500 of the world's leading family lawyers.

In 1982, Tooth established his own law firm, Raymond Tooth and Co. Later on, the firm would be renamed Sears Tooth. The firm, based out of London, consists of two partners, one assistant solicitor, and three other fee earners. Despite the firm's relatively small size, their cases are often reported in British law reports more frequently than some larger firms. Sears Tooth was involved in the prominent Miller vs. Miller House of Lords case. In addition to high-profile divorces, Tooth and his firm also handle cases that prevent the removal or dissipation of assets and domestic violence as well. He charges roughly £450 per hour.

His firm originated the eponymous "Sears Tooth agreement", a deed that assigns the client's winnings to the solicitor to enable the client to fund the case.

He has earned the nickname Jaws for the manner in which he fights for his clients money in the courtroom. He is also a member of the International Academy of Matrimonial Lawyers. He has gone up against several high-profile British celebrities, such as Jude Law, Michael Barrymore and Colin Montgomerie.

Tooth, never one to shy away from controversial advice, was once quoted as saying: "A rich man in my view should not marry a poor woman. If he does, then he must have a pre-nuptial agreement." He runs his business by the motto: "Don't get even, get Tooth." Tooth was sued in 2005 by a former client and non-celebrity, Olga Spasic. In the end, he was found by the court to have overcharged her for his services by £12,000.,

== List of celebrity clients ==
- Sadie Frost (divorced Jude Law)
- Cheryl Barrymore (divorced Michael Barrymore)
- Eimear Montgomerie (divorced Colin Montgomerie)
- Patti Boyd (divorced Eric Clapton)
- Susan Renouf (divorced Robert Sangster)
- Irina Abramovich (divorced Roman Abramovich)

Originally, the divorce between Roman and Irina Abramovich was believed to have the potential to be the largest divorce settlement in history, with Irina requesting half of Roman's £18 billion fortune. Ultimately, Irina and Roman settled out of court for £155 million.

== Horse racing ==
In addition to being a famous celebrity lawyer in the UK, Tooth also spends some of his free time on the racetrack, as he is also a prominent horse owner. He has worked with some of the UK's most renowned trainers, such as Nicky Henderson and Richard Hannon, Sr. In the 2008/09 season, Tooth came close to collecting a £1,000,000 bonus put up by WBX for winning the Triple Crown of Hurdling, just missing out when his horse, Punjabi, fell while vying for the lead in the Christmas Hurdle.

Significant racing wins:

- Champion Hurdle (Punjabi, 2009)
- Fighting Fifth Hurdle (Punjabi, 2008)
- Punchestown Champion Hurdle (Punjabi, 2008)
- Tattersalls October Auction Stakes (Exclamation, 2007)
- Coronation Stakes (Indian Ink, 2007)
- Ballymore Properties Champion Hurdle (Punjabi, 2007)
- Cheveley Park Stakes (Indian Ink, 2006)
- Watership Down Stud Sales Stakes (Indian Ink, 2006)

== See also ==
- Divorce
- Family law
- International Academy of Matrimonial Lawyers
- List of most expensive divorces
- Punjabi racehorse
