= National Spirit (horse) =

British-bred Thoroughbred racehorse

- Sire: Scottish Union
- Grandsire: Cameronian
- Dam: Cocktail
- Damsire: Coronach
- Sex: Gelding
- Foaled: 1941
- Country: Great Britain
- Colour: Chestnut
- Breeder: Mr L. A. Abelson
- Owner: Mr L. A. Abelson
- Trainer: Vic Smythe

Major wins
- Champion Hurdle Challenge Cup (1947, 1948); Rank Challenge Cup (1948, 1949, 1950); Princess Elizabeth Handicap (1946, 1949); Oteley Hurdle (1949, 1950); Milburn Hurdle (1948, 1950); Trespasser Hurdle (1949); King George VI Stakes (1947, 1948); Cosmopolitan Cup (1947); Croyden Stakes (1947, 1948)

Honours
- National Spirit Hurdle at Fontwell

National Spirit (foaled 1941) was a British National Hunt horse best known for winning the Champion Hurdle twice, as well as the Rank Challenge Cup at Fontwell three times. He was one of the best hurdlers in the post-war era, and was also an excellent dual-purpose horse, winning several major races on the Flat. Along with Irish hurdler Hatton's Grace, National Spirit was one of the most popular horses of his time

== Background ==
A big, long striding chestnut gelding, National Spirit was bred by Mr L. A. Abelson, who owned him throughout his career. His sire, Scottish Union, was a son of Derby and 2000 Guineas winner Cameronian, while his dam Cocktail was a daughter of St Leger winner Coronach. National Spirit was originally called 'Avago', before being renamed and put into training with Epsom based trainer Vic Smyth. He was noted to be somewhat of a character, and loved to 'drop' his riders during exercise by whipping round without warning.

== Career ==
=== 1945/46 Season ===
It took several races for National Spirit to register a win, and he was tried over both hurdles and fences. After two fifth-place finishes in novice hurdles at Fontwell and Windsor, Smyth tried him in chases, only for National Spirit to run out and then fall in his two attempts. Reverted to the smaller obstacles, National Spirit recorded a second place at Plumpton before finally winning the Middleton Novices Hurdle at Fontwell on 4 May 1946. He followed that up with a four length win in the Mayfield Hurdle at Plumpton, before a victory in an amateur riders hurdle at Fontwell, where he was ridden by John Hislop.

Rather than take a summer break as most National Hunt horses did, National Spirit was kept in training to race on the flat. He raced at tracks across the country including Newmarket, and registered wins in the Elvaston Stakes over 1 mile 3 furlongs at Nottingham, the Municipal Handicap over 1 mile 6 furlongs at Doncaster, and the November Handicap Plate over two miles at Thirsk.

=== 1946/47 Season ===
Just four days after his win on the flat at Thirsk, National Spirit reappeared over hurdles at Wolverhampton, winning the Walsall Handicap Hurdle by two lengths from Scottish Welcome. A month later, he won the Princess Elizabeth Handicap Hurdle at Doncaster by five lengths from Legend Of Rank. National Spirit then had a break from racing, and reappeared in the Champion Hurdle Challenge Cup at the Cheltenham Festival in April. National Spirit was moderately fancied at 7/1, as also in the field were French favourite Le Paillon (who would go on to win the 1947 Prix de l’Arc de Triomphe) and 1946 Champion Hurdle winner Distel. Vic Smyth was confident of his horse's chances, "He'll [Le Paillon] have to be pretty good to beat mine", and National Spirit repaid his faith under a clever ride from Danny Morgan, who hugged the inner rail while Le Paillon went wide, ultimately beating the French horse by a length.

Once again, National Spirit switched to flat racing during the summer, registering wins in the King George VI Stakes at Liverpool, the Cosmopolitan Cup and the Croyden Stakes, both at Lingfield. He also finished fourth to Culrain under 9 st 5 lbs in the Northumberland Plate and fifth to Procne in the Ebor Handicap.

=== 1947/48 Season ===
National Spirit's first race over hurdles saw him defeated in the Princess Elizabeth Hurdle by Wintersmoon while trying to give the winner over two stone in weight. He bounced back in the Shipley Bridge Handicap Hurdle at Lingfield, before being beaten less than a length in the Trespasser Handicap Hurdle at the same track.

He returned to Cheltenham for a second win in the Champion Hurdle, winning impressively by two lengths from D.U.K.W. under his trainer's nephew, Ron Smyth. Life referred to him as "a real champion in every way". Back in eighth was an Irish trained gelding called Hatton's Grace, who would improve over the next season to win the next three renewals of the Champion Hurdle.

National Spirit recorded his most successful Flat campaign in the summer of 1948, winning five times from seven starts. He won the King George VI Stakes at Liverpool for the second time, before also winning the Burstow Handicap and second Croyden Stakes at Lingfield, the Earle Dorling Memorial Handicap over a mile and half at Epsom, and the Melbourne Stakes at Newmarket in September.

=== 1948/49 Season ===
National Spirit also had a successful hurdling season, with three wins from five starts. He won the Rank Challenge Cup at Fontwell against a small field, and then led all the way to win Sandown's Milburn Hurdle from D.U.K.W. A poor effort under 12 st 12 lbs in a hurdle at Plumpton preceded an impressive win in the Oteley Hurdle at Sandown, where he led after the fifth flight and was never challenged. In the Champion Hurdle, National Spirit appeared to run below form when only fourth to the Vincent O'Brien trained Hatton's Grace, struggling to get on terms to challenge and losing ground. Some fans blamed jockey Bryan Marshall for holding the horse up when he normally raced from the front, and believed he might gain his revenge against the Irish horse the next year.

Back on the Flat, National Spirit won just two of nine races over the summer, the Mid-Day Sun Handicap at Lingfield and the Hove Plate at Brighton.

=== 1949/50 Season ===
National Spirit returned to form in the autumn of 1949, winning his second Rank Challenge Cup by five lengths from Secret Service, then defying 12 st 7 lbs in weight to win the Princess Elizabeth Handicap Hurdle at Doncaster. National Spirit continued his win streak with a brave victory in the Trespasser Hurdle by a short head (giving second place Harlech 21 lbs) and an effortless win in the Oteley Hurdle by eight lengths under 12 st 7 lbs. Returning to Cheltenham, he was challenging eventual winner Hatton's Grace until a mistake at the final hurdle checked his momentum and knocked him back to fourth.

National Spirit ran four times on the Flat in 1950, but failed to win a race, his best effort coming over 12 furlongs at Epsom in April.

=== 1950/51 Season ===
Back at Fontwell, National Spirit recorded a third win in the Rank Challenge Cup, beating Nagara by an impressive fifteen lengths. He also won a second Milburn Hurdle at Sandown, before falling in the Champion Hurdle when challenging Hatton's Grace, who went on to complete a hat-trick in the race. Some observers felt that National Spirit would have gone close if he hadn't have fallen, and Peter O'Sullevan referred to the two veterans as 'two Peter Pans' who proved their class against younger horses.

Once again, National Spirit failed to win on the Flat over the summer, although he managed to finish second in the Mid-Day Sun Handicap, and third in the Finale Plate at Lingfield, the last race of the Flat season.

=== 1951/52 Season ===
National Spirit recorded just one win over hurdles, in the Bullcroft Hurdle at Doncaster where he gave two stone in weight to Jigaway and beat him by fifteen lengths. He was second in the Rank Challenge Cup to six-year-old Master Bidar, third in the Oteley Hurdle under 12 st 7 lbs and second in the Pangbourne Hurdle at Windsor. Running in the Champion Hurdle for the final time, National Spirit finished ahead of Hatton's Grace, but both were unplaced behind Sir Ken, who would go on to win the race three times. National Spirit completed his season by finishing second to Dankali by three lengths in the Sprotbrough Hurdle at Doncaster.

National Spirit ran for the final time on the Flat at Lincoln, where he finished last under 12 st 7 lbs in an Amateur Riders Handicap Plate.

=== 1952/53 Season ===
In his last season of racing, National Spirit failed to win but ran some good races in defeat, including in the Amberley Handicap Hurdle at Fontwell where conceded over three stone and finished second to Garter Blue, and in the Oakside Hurdle where he was third to Champion Hurdler Sir Ken.

National Spirit's final race came on 9 March 1953, when he finished third to Orphan Boy in the Spring Grove Hurdle at Wye. He concluded his career as the winner of nineteen hurdle races and thirteen Flat races worth £15,702. After his retirement, the Grade 2 National Spirit Hurdle was named in his honour at Fontwell, the track where he had had such success.
