= Champion Hurdle =

Hurdle horse race in Britain

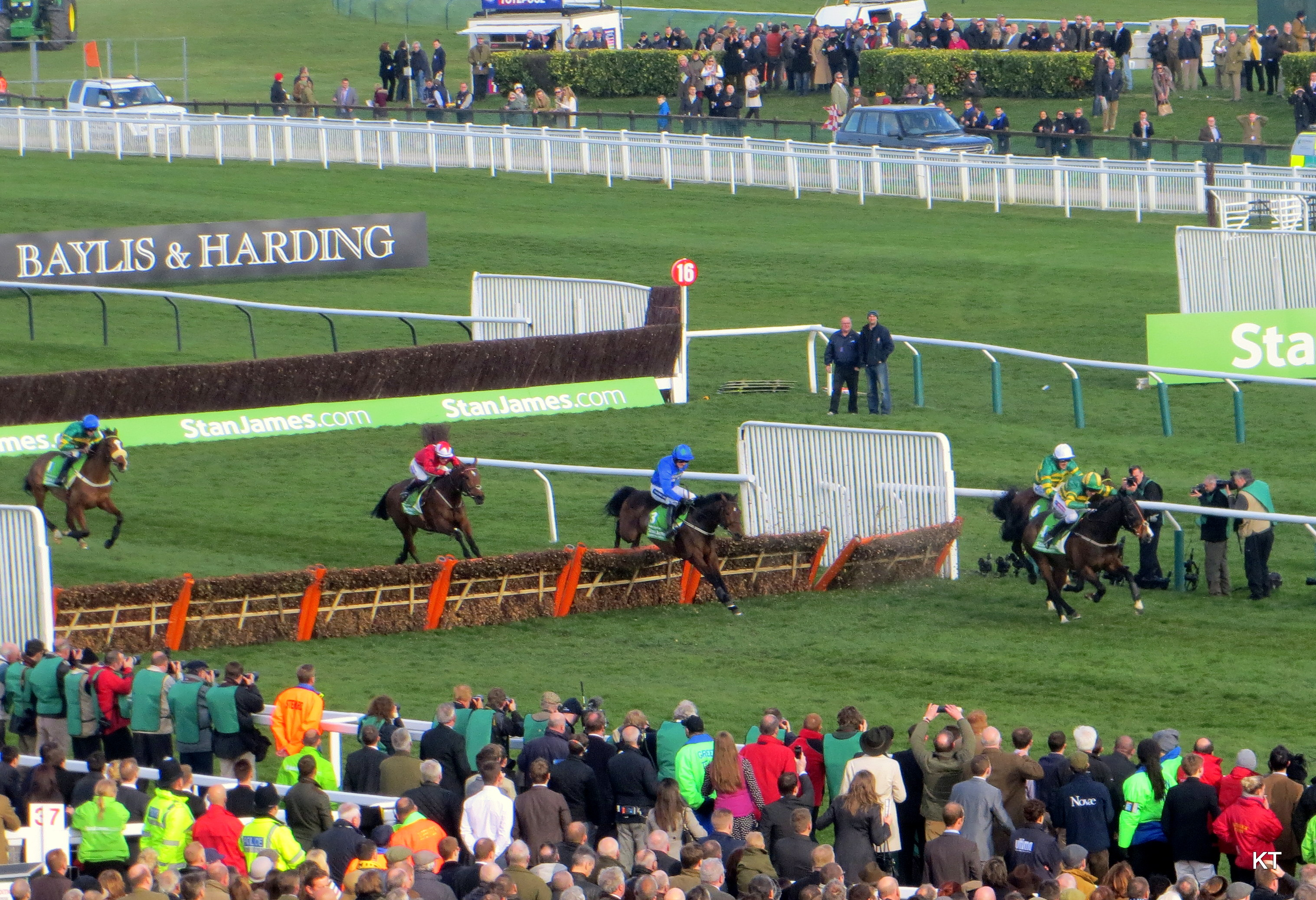
- Jezki leads on his way to victory in the 2014 running
- Class: Grade 1
- Location: Cheltenham Racecourse; Cheltenham, England
- Inaugurated: 1927
- Race type: Hurdle race
- Sponsor: Unibet
- Website: Cheltenham Racecourse

Race information
- Distance: 2m 87y (3,298 metres)
- Surface: Turf
- Track: Left-handed
- Qualification: Four-years-old and up
- Weight: 11 st 0 lb (4yo); 11 st 10 lb (5yo+); Allowances; 7 lb for fillies and mares
- Purse: £450,000 (2025); 1st: £253,215

Champion Hurdle Challenge Trophy
2026
Lossiemouth	Brighterdaysahead	The New Lion

Previous years
2025
Golden Ace	Burdett Road	Winter Fog
2024
State Man	Irish Point	Luccia
2023
Constitution Hill	State Man	Zanahiyr
2022
Honeysuckle	Epatante	Saint Roi
2021
Honeysuckle	Sharjah	Epatante

2020-2011
2020
Epatante	Sharjah	Darver Star
2019
Espoir D'Allen	Melon	Silver Streak
2018
Buveur D'Air	Melon	Mick Jazz
2017
Buveur D'Air	My Tent Or Yours	Petit Mouchoir
2016
Annie Power	My Tent Or Yours	Nichols Canyon
2015
Faugheen	Arctic Fire	Hurricane Fly
2014
Jezki	My Tent Or Yours	The New One
2013
Hurricane Fly	Rock on Ruby	Countrywide Flame
2012
Rock on Ruby	Overturn	Hurricane Fly
2011
Hurricane Fly	Peddlers Cross	Oscar Whisky

2010-2001
2010
Binocular	Khyber Kim	Zaynar
2009
Punjabi	Celestial Halo	Binocular
2008
Katchit	Osana	Punjabi
2007
Sublimity	Brave Inca	Afsoun
2006
Brave Inca	Macs Joy	Hardy Eustace
2005
Hardy Eustace	Harchibald	Brave Inca
2004
Hardy Eustace	Rooster Booster	Intersky Falcon
2003
Rooster Booster	Westender	Rhinestone Cowboy
2002
Hors La Loi III	Marble Arch	Bilboa

2000-1991
2000
Istabraq	Hors La Loi III	Blue Royal
1999
Istabraq	Theatreworld	French Holly
1998
Istabraq	Theatreworld	I'm Supposin
1997
Make A Stand	Theatreworld	Space Trucker
1996
Collier Bay	Alderbrook	Pridwell
1995
Alderbrook	Large Action	Danoli
1994
Flakey Dove	Oh So Risky	Large Action
1993
Granville Again	Royal Derbi	Halkopous
1992
Royal Gait	Oh So Risky	Ruling
1991
Morley Street	Nomadic Way	Ruling

1990-1981
1990
Kribensis	Nomadic Way	Past Glories
1989
Beech Road	Celtic Chief	Celtic Shot
1988
Celtic Shot	Classical Charm	Celtic Chief
1987
See You Then	Flatterer	Barnbrook Again
1986
See You Then	Gaye Brief	Nohalmdun
1985
See You Then	Robin Wonder	Stans Pride
1984
Dawn Run	Cima	Very Promising
1983
Gaye Brief	Boreen Prince	For Auction
1982
For Auction	Broadsword	Ekbalco
1981
Sea Pigeon	Pollardstown	Daring Run

1980-1970
1980
Sea Pigeon	Monksfield	Birds Nest
1979
Monksfield	Sea Pigeon	Beacon Light
1978
Monksfield	Sea Pigeon	Night Nurse
1977
Night Nurse	Monksfield	Dramatist
1976
Night Nurse	Birds Nest	Flash Imp
1975
Comedy of Errors	Flash Imp	Tree Tangle
1974
Lanzarote	Comedy of Errors	Yenisei
1973
Comedy of Errors	Easby Abbey	Captain Christy
1972
Bula	Boxer	Lyford Cay
1971
Bula	Persian War	Major Rose
1970
Persian War	Major Rose	Escalus

The Champion Hurdle is a Grade 1 National Hunt hurdle race in Great Britain which is open to horses aged four years or older. It is run on the Old Course at Cheltenham over a distance of about 2 miles and ½ furlong (2 miles and 87 yards or 3,298 metres), with eight hurdles to be jumped. The most prestigious hurdling event in the British calendar, its list of winners features many of the most highly acclaimed hurdlers in the sport's history. The Champion Hurdle is scheduled to take place each year on the opening day of the Cheltenham Festival in March and is the last leg of the Triple Crown of Hurdling. As part of a sponsorship agreement with the online gambling operator Unibet, the race is now known as the Unibet Champion Hurdle.

== History ==
The first Champion Hurdle was run in 1927, and its inaugural winner, Blaris, was awarded prize money of £365. In its second year the event was won by Brown Jack, who subsequently became a prolific winner of long-distance flat races. The Champion Hurdle was abandoned in 1931 due to persistent frost, and in 1932 it was contested by just three horses – the smallest field in its history. The race was cancelled twice during World War II, in 1943 and 1944.

The 1947 renewal paved the way for a golden era in the Champion Hurdle with just 3 winners until 1955 – National Spirit, Hatton's Grace and Sir Ken, all of them etched into the list of greatest ever hurdlers. Even though it was postponed twice because of winter snows, taking place in mid-April, it proved most popular with a record attendance at that time of 30,000 racing fans. The winner National Spirit became the second horse to retain the hurdling crown while the runner-up to him, a bay horse called Le Paillon trained by Alec Head's father, went on to race on the flat and won the Prix de l'Arc de Triomphe the same year.

As National Spirit was winning his second Champion Hurdle, the horse down the field, Hatton's Grace, trained by one of the most important figures in horse racing Vincent O'Brien, was about to make history and improved for the next seasons to become the first hat-trick winner of the race. The achievement of Hatton's Grace was soon to be matched by Sir Ken, who recorded three successive victories in the 1950s. Before the second of these Sir Ken was given a starting price of 2/5 (a £5 bet would have won £2). He is the shortest-priced horse to have won the race.

The 1970s produced another golden era of hurdling with the third Champion Hurdle triple winner Persian War and the exploits of double champions in Night Nurse, Monksfield, Bula and Comedy of Errors, who was the first horse to win two non-consecutive titles. The Racing Post declared the 1977 running to be the "strongest of fields ever assembled", with Night Nurse beating two other subsequent dual Champion Hurdle winners in Sea Pigeon and Monksfield.

The 1984 winner, Dawn Run, became the second mare to win the Champion Hurdle. In the same year she also won the Irish and French versions of the event, and two seasons later she won the most prestigious chase in National Hunt racing, the Cheltenham Gold Cup. She remains the only horse to have completed the Champion Hurdle-Gold Cup double. From 1985 to 1987 the Champion Hurdle was dominated by See You Then, who became the event's fourth three-time winner. The sixth mare to win the race was Honeysuckle, the winner of the 2021 and 2022 renewals whilst the most recent and eight mare to win was Lossiemouth, trained in Ireland by Willie Mullins, who triumphed in 2026.

The last triple winner of the Champion Hurdle was Istabraq, whose successes came in 1998, 1999 and 2000. In the early weeks of 2001 he was the odds-on favourite to win the race again, for an unprecedented fourth time. However, this opportunity was lost as the entire Cheltenham Festival was cancelled that year because of an outbreak of foot-and-mouth disease. Istabraq returned for the 2002 running, but on this occasion he failed to complete the race, and he was retired thereafter.

Commercial sponsorship of the Champion Hurdle began in 1978, and it was initially backed by Waterford Crystal. Smurfit (now known as the Smurfit Kappa Group), began supporting the race in 1991 and from 2010 to 2017 was sponsored by StanJames.com. Stan James's parent company Unibet became the title sponsor from the 2018 running. The race is the final leg of the Road to Cheltenham, a series of high-class hurdles races consisting of the Fighting Fifth Hurdle, the International Hurdle and the Champion Hurdle Trial.

The Champion Hurdle has been continually run on a Tuesday since 1980. The 1927 race was run on a Wednesday, followed by a Thursday in 1928 and then Tuesday from 1929 to 1939. The race moved to Wednesday for 1940 and 1941 followed by rare Saturday runnings in 1942 and 1945. Tuesday became the established day for the Champion Hurdle from 1946 to 1960, with the exception of the postponed races in 1947 (Saturday) and 1955 (Wednesday). From 1961 to 1979 the race was always run on a Wednesday, except in 1964 when it took place on Friday for the only time in its history.

In 2023 Zanahiyr became the first horse to be disqualified. After finishing third in the 2022 running ahead of Saint Roi, he was disqualified and placed last by a British Horseracing Authority tribunal in early 2023 after a banned substance was discovered in a sample taken on race day. Saint Roi was awarded third place and all other runners were promoted by one place.

== Records ==
Most successful horse (3 wins):

- Hatton's Grace – 1949, 1950, 1951
- Sir Ken – 1952, 1953, 1954
- Persian War – 1968, 1969, 1970
- See You Then – 1985, 1986, 1987
- Istabraq – 1998, 1999, 2000

Leading jockey (4 wins):

- Tim Molony – Hatton's Grace (1951), Sir Ken (1952, 1953, 1954)
- Ruby Walsh – Hurricane Fly (2011, 2013), Faugheen (2015), Annie Power (2016)
- Barry Geraghty - Punjabi (2009), Jezki (2014), Buveur D'Air (2018), Epatante (2020)

Leading trainer (9 wins):

- Nicky Henderson – See You Then (1985, 1986, 1987), Punjabi (2009), Binocular (2010), Buveur D'Air (2017, 2018), Epatante (2020), Constitution Hill (2023)

Leading owner (9 wins):

- J. P. McManus – Istabraq (1998, 1999, 2000), Binocular (2010), Jezki (2014), Buveur D'Air (2017, 2018), Espoir d'Allen (2019), Epatante (2020)

== List of winners ==
- Winning mares indicated by †
- Winning trainers based in Great Britain unless indicated (IRE) = Ireland

Date	Winner	SP	Age	Jockey	Trainer	Owner	Runners	Runners-up	Time
1927, 9 March	Blaris	11/10F	6	George Duller	Bill Payne	Mrs H. Hollins	4	2nd. (8 L) Beddam 7/2; 3rd. (1 L) Harpist 9/4	4:13.6
1928, 15 March	Brown Jack	4/1	4	Bilbie Rees	Aubrey Hastings	Sir Harold Wernher	6	2nd. (1 1/2 L) Peace River 5/1; 3rd. (6 L) Blaris 2/1F	4:05.0
1929, 12 March	Royal Falcon	11/2	6	Dick Rees	Bob Gore	Miss Victoria Williams-Bulkeley	6	2nd. (4 L) Kolie 4/1; 3rd. (6 L) Cleer Cash 7/4F	4:01.2
1930, 11 March	Brown Tony	7/2	4	Tommy Cullinan	Jack Anthony	Mrs J. de Sélincourt	5	2nd. (hd) Cleer Cash 2/1F; 3rd. (sh) Peertoi 9/2	4:20.2
No race 1931 (Note: The race was abandoned in 1931 due to frost)
1932, 1 March	Insurance	4/5F	5	Ted Leader	Basil Briscoe	Dorothy Paget	3	2nd. (12 L) Song of Essex 5/4; 3rd. (dst) Jack Drummer 33/1	4:14.2
1933, 7 March	Insurance	10/11F	6	Billy Stott	Basil Briscoe	Dorothy Paget	5	2nd. (3/4 L) Windermere Laddie 4/1; 3rd. (8 L) Indian Salmon 100/8	4:37.6
1934, 6 March	Chenango	4/9F	7	Danny Morgan	Ivor Anthony	Pete Bostwick	5	2nd. (5 L) Pompelmoose 9/2; 3rd. (6 L) Black Duncan 20/1	4:17.0
1935, 12 March	Lion Courage	100/8	7	Gerry Wilson	Frank Brown	R. Fox Carlyon	11	2nd. (1/2 L) Gay Light 9/4F; 3rd. (3/4 L) Hill Song 3/1	4:00.2
1936, 9 March	Victor Norman	4/1	5	Frenchie Nicholson	Morgan Blair	Mrs Michael Stephens	8	2nd. (3 L) Free Fare 5/2F; 3rd. (1 1/2 L) Cactus II 20/1	4:14.4
1937, 9 March	Free Fare	2/1F	9	Georges Pellerin	Ted Gwilt	Ben Warner	7	2nd. (2 L) Our Hope 100/8; 3rd. (sh) Menton 11/2	4:19.2
1938, 8 March	Our Hope	5/1	9	Perry Harding	Roderic Gubbins	Roderic Gubbins	5	2nd. (1 1/2 L) Chuchoteur 9/2; 3rd. (10 L) Lobau 100/6	4:04.8
1939, 7 March	African Sister†	10/1	7	Keith Piggott	Charles Piggott	Horace Brueton	13	2nd. (3 L) Vitement 20/1; 3rd. (1/2 L) Apple Peel 100/8	4:13.6
1940, 13 March	Solford	5/2F	9	Sean Magee	Owen Anthony	Dorothy Paget	8	2nd. (1 1/2 L) African Sister 8/1; 3rd. (4 L) Carton 3/1	4:13.4
1941, 19 March	Seneca	7/1	4	Ron Smyth	Vic Smyth	Sir Malcolm McAlpine	6	2nd. (hd) Anarchist 33/1; 3rd. (2 L) Ephorus 8/1	4:09.0
1942, 14 March	Forestation	10/1	4	Ron Smyth	Vic Smyth	Vic Smyth	20	2nd. (3 L) Anarchist 100/8; 3rd. (3 L) Southport 9/2F	4:10.4
No races 1943–44 (Note: Race was not run in 1943 and 1944 because of World War II)
1945, 31 March	Brains Trust	9/2	5	Fred Rimell	Gerry Wilson	F. Blakeway	16	2nd. (3/4 L) Vidi 100/6; 3rd. (3/4 L) Red 10/1 April	4:09.4
1946, 12 March	Distel	4/5F	5	Bobby O'Ryan	Charles Rogers (IRE)	Dorothy Paget	8	2nd. (4 L) Carnival Boy 7/2; 3rd. (1/2 L) Robin O'Chantry 100/6	4:05.0
1947, 12 April (Note: The 1947 running was postponed twice due to winter snows)	National Spirit	7/1	6	Danny Morgan	Vic Smyth	Len Abelson	14	2nd. (1 L) Le Paillon 2/1F; 3rd. (2 L) Freddy Fox 8/1	4:03.8
1948, 2 March	National Spirit	6/4F	7	Ron Smyth	Vic Smyth	Len Abelson	12	2nd. (2 L) D.UKW. 5/1; 3rd. (3/4 L) Encoroli 20/1	3:54.8
1949, 7 March	Hatton's Grace	100/7	9	Aubrey Brabazon	Vincent O'Brien (IRE)	Mrs Harry Keogh	14	2nd. (6 L) Vatelys 10/1; 3rd. (1 L) Captain Fox 100/9	4:00.6
1950, 7 March	Hatton's Grace	5/2F	10	Aubrey Brabazon	Vincent O'Brien (IRE)	Mrs Harry Keogh	12	2nd. (1 1/2 L) Harlech 9/2; 3rd. (2 L) Speciality 100/6	3:59.6
1951, 6 March	Hatton's Grace	4/1	11	Tim Molony	Vincent O'Brien (IRE)	Mrs Harry Keogh	8	2nd. (5 L) Pyrrhus III 11/2; 3rd. (1/2 L) Prince Hindou 9/2	4:11.2
1952, 4 March	Sir Ken	3/1F	5	Tim Molony	Willie Stephenson	Maurice Kingsley	16	2nd. (2 L) Noholme 100/7; 3rd. (4 L) Approval 9/1	4:03.2
1953, 3 March	Sir Ken	2/5F	6	Tim Molony	Willie Stephenson	Maurice Kingsley	7	2nd. (2 L) Galatian 4/1; 3rd. (1/2 L) Teapot II 100/9	3:55.4
1954, 2 March	Sir Ken	4/9F	7	Tim Molony	Willie Stephenson	Maurice Kingsley	13	2nd. (1 L) Impney 9/1; 3rd. (3 L) Galatian 10/1	4:11.0
1955, 9 March	Clair Soleil	5/2F	6	Fred Winter	Ryan Price	Gerry Judd	21	2nd. (hd) Stroller 7/2; 3rd. (4 L) Cruachan 50/1	4:12.8
1956, 6 March	Doorknocker	100/9	8	Harry Sprague	Charlie Hall	Clifford Nicholson	15	2nd. (3/4 L) Quita Que 33/1; 3rd. (4 L) Baby Don 100/8	4:02.2
1957, 12 March	Merry Deal	28/1	7	Grenville Underwood	Arthur Jones	Arthur Jones	16	2nd. (5 L) Quita Que 15/2; 3rd. (5 L) Tout Ou Rien 100/8	4:07.4
1958, 11 March	Bandalore	20/1	7	George Slack	Stan Wright	Dorothy Wright	18	2nd. (2 L) Tokoron 5/1F; 3rd. (3 L) Retour de Flamme 11/2	3:56.0
1959, 3 March	Fare Time	13/2	6	Fred Winter	Ryan Price	Gerry Judd	14	2nd. (4 L) Ivy Green 40/1; 3rd. (1 L) Prudent King 13/2	4:07.8
1960, 8 March	Another Flash	11/4F	6	Bobby Beasley	Paddy Sleator (IRE)	John Byrne	12	2nd. (2 L) Albergo 11/2; 3rd. (3 L) Saffron Tartan 3/1	3:55.0
1961, 8 March	Eborneezer	4/1	6	Fred Winter	Ryan Price	Dr Burjor Pajgar	17	2nd. (3 L) Moss Bank 7/4F; 3rd. (1 1/2 L) Farmer's Boy 8/1	4:10.0
1962, 14 March	Anzio	11/2	5	Willie Robinson	Fulke Walwyn	Sir Thomas Ainsworth	14	2nd. (3 L) Quelle Chance 11/2; 3rd. (1 1/2 L) Another Flash 11/10F	4:00.2
1963, 13 March	Winning Fair	100/9	8	Alan Lillingston (Note: amateur jockey)	George Spencer (IRE)	George Spencer	21	2nd. (3 L) Farrney Fox 10/1; 3rd. (nk) Quelle Chance 100/7	4:15.5
1964, 6 March (Note: In 1964 an objection to the winner by the stewards was over-ruled.)	Magic Court	100/7	6	Pat McCarron	Tommy Robson	James McGhie	24	2nd. (4 L) Another Flash 6/1F; 3rd. (3/4 L) Kirriemuir 100/7	4:08.0
1965, 10 March	Kirriemuir	50/1	5	Willie Robinson	Fulke Walwyn	Dorothy Beddington	19	2nd. (1 L) Spartan General 8/1; 3rd. (1 1/2 L) Worcran 8/1	4:06.6
1966, 16 March	Salmon Spray	4/1	8	Johnny Haine	Bob Turnell	Mrs John Rogerson	19	2nd. (3 L) Sempervivum 20/1; 3rd. (3/4 L) Flyingbolt 15/8F	4:10.2
1967, 15 March	Saucy Kit	100/6	6	Roy Edwards	Peter Easterby	K. F. Alder	23	2nd. (4 L) Makaldar 11/4F; 3rd. (1 L) Talgo Abbess 100/8	4:11.2
1968, 20 March	Persian War	4/1	5	Jimmy Uttley	Colin Davies	Henry Alper	16	2nd. (4 L) Chorus 7/2F; 3rd. (5 L) Black Justice 100/6	4:03.8
1969, 19 March	Persian War	6/4F	6	Jimmy Uttley	Colin Davies	Henry Alper	17	2nd. (4 L) Drumikill 100/7; 3rd. (22 L) Privy Seal 33/1	4:41.8
1970, 18 March	Persian War	5/4F	7	Jimmy Uttley	Colin Davies	Henry Alper	14	2nd. (1 1/2 L) Major Rose 8/1; 3rd. (1 1/2 L) Escalus 25/1	4:13.8
1971, 18 March	Bula	15/8F	6	Paul Kelleway	Fred Winter	Bill Edwards-Heathcote	9	2nd. (4 L) Persian War; 3rd. (1 L) Major Rose	4:22.3
1972, 15 March	Bula	8/11F	7	Paul Kelleway	Fred Winter	Bill Edwards-Heathcote	9	2nd. (8 L) Boxer 25/1; 3rd. (3 L) Lyford Cay 66/1	4:25.3
1973, 14 March	Comedy of Errors	8/1	6	Bill Smith	Fred Rimell	Ted Wheatley	8	2nd. (1 1/2 L) Easby Abbey 20/1; 3rd. (2 L) Captain Christy 85/40	4:07.7
1974, 13 March	Lanzarote	7/4	6	Richard Pitman	Fred Winter	Lord Howard de Walden	7	2nd. Comedy of Errors 4/6F; 3rd. Yenisei 100/1	4:17.7
1975, 12 March	Comedy of Errors	11/8F	8	Ken White	Fred Rimell	Ted Wheatley	13	2nd. Flash Imp 12/1; 3rd. Tree Tangle 10/1	4:28.5
1976, 17 March	Night Nurse	2/1F	5	Paddy Broderick	Peter Easterby	Reg Spencer	8	2nd. (1 L) Birds Nest 100/30; 3rd. Flash Imp 40/1	4:05.9
1977, 16 March	Night Nurse	15/2	6	Paddy Broderick	Peter Easterby	Reg Spencer	10	2nd. (2 L) Monksfield; 3rd. (1 L) Dramatist	4:24.0
1978, 15 March	Monksfield	11/2	6	Tommy Kinane	Des McDonogh (IRE)	Dr Michael Mangan	13	2nd. (2 L) Sea Pigeon 5/1; 3rd. (5 L) Night Nurse 3/1F	4:12.7
1979, 14 March	Monksfield	9/4F	7	Dessie Hughes	Des McDonogh (IRE)	Dr Michael Mangan	10	2nd. (1/2 L) Sea Pigeon 6/1; 3rd. Beacon Light 22/1	4:27.9
1980, 11 March	Sea Pigeon	13/2	10	Jonjo O'Neill	Peter Easterby	Pat Muldoon	9	2nd. Monksfield; 3rd. Birds Nest	4:06.0
1981, 17 March	Sea Pigeon	7/4F	11	John Francome	Peter Easterby	Pat Muldoon	14	2nd. Pollardstown 9/1; 3rd. Daring Run 8/1	4:11.4
1982, 16 March	For Auction	40/1	6	Colin Magnier	Michael Cunningham (IRE)	Danno Heaslip	14	2nd. Broadsword 100/30; 3rd. Ekbalco 7/2	4:12.4
1983, 15 March	Gaye Brief	7/1	6	Richard Linley	Mercy Rimell	Sheikh Ali Abu Khamsin	17	2nd. Boreen Prince 50/1; 3rd. For Auction 3/1 JF	3:57.8
1984, 13 March	Dawn Run†	4/5F	6	Jonjo O'Neill	Paddy Mullins (IRE)	Charmian Hill	14	2nd. Cima 66/1; 3rd. Very Promising 16/1	3:52.6
1985, 12 March	See You Then	16/1	5	Steve Smith Eccles	Nicky Henderson	Stype Wood Stud	14	2nd. Robin Wonder 66/1; 3rd. Stans Pride 100/1	3:51.7
1986, 11 March	See You Then	5/6F	6	Steve Smith Eccles	Nicky Henderson	Stype Wood Stud	23	2nd. Gaye Brief 14/1; 3rd. Nohalmdun 20/1	3:53.3
1987, 17 March	See You Then	11/10F	7	Steve Smith Eccles	Nicky Henderson	Stype Wood Stud	18	2nd. Flatterer 10/1; 3rd. Barnbrook Again 14/1	3:57.20
1988, 15 March	Celtic Shot	7/1	6	Peter Scudamore	Fred Winter	David Horton	21	2nd. (4 L) Classical Charm 33/1; 3rd. (3 L) Celtic Chief 5/2F	4:14.40
1989, 14 March	Beech Road	50/1	7	Richard Guest	Toby Balding	Tony Geake	15	2nd. (2 L) Celtic Chief 6/1; 3rd. (1 L) Celtic Shot 8/1	4:02.10
1990, 13 March	Kribensis	95/40	6	Richard Dunwoody	Michael Stoute	Sheikh Mohammed	19	2nd. (3 L) Nomadic Way 8/1; 3rd. (3/4 L) Past Glories 150/1	3:50.70
1991, 12 March	Morley Street	4/1F	7	Jimmy Frost	Toby Balding	Michael Jackson Bloodstock	24	2nd. (1/2 L) Nomadic Way 9/1; 3rd. (hd) Ruling 50/1	3:54.80
1992, 10 March	Royal Gait	6/1	9	Graham McCourt	James Fanshawe	Sheikh Mohammed	16	2nd. (1/2 L) Oh So Risky 20/1; 3rd. (shd) Ruling 20/1	3:57.40
1993, 16 March	Granville Again	13/2	7	Peter Scudamore	Martin Pipe	Eric Scarth	18	2nd. (1 L) Royal Derbi 50/1; 3rd. (2 1/2 L) Halkopous 9/1	3:51.40
1994, 15 March	Flakey Dove†	9/1	8	Mark Dwyer	Richard Price	John Price	15	2nd. (1 1/2 L) Oh So Risky 9/4F; 3rd. (3/4 L) Large Action 8/1	4:02.30
1995, 14 March	Alderbrook	11/2	6	Norman Williamson	Kim Bailey	Ernie Pick	15	2nd. (5 L) Large Action 4/1 JF; 3rd. (2 L) Danoli 4/1 JF	4:03.10
1996, 12 March	Collier Bay	9/1	6	Graham Bradley	Jim Old	Wally Sturt	16	2nd. (2 1/2 L) Alderbrook 10/11F; 3rd. (6 L) Pridwell 33/1	3:59.00
1997, 11 March	Make A Stand	7/1	6	Tony McCoy	Martin Pipe	Peter Deal	17	2nd. (5 L) Theatreworld 33/1; 3rd. (3/4 L) Space Trucker 9/2	3:48.40
1998, 17 March	Istabraq	3/1F	6	Charlie Swan	Aidan O'Brien (IRE)	J. P. McManus	18	2nd. (12 L) Theatreworld 20/1; 3rd. (1 L) I'm Supposin 6/1	3:49.10
1999, 16 March	Istabraq	4/9F	7	Charlie Swan	Aidan O'Brien (IRE)	J. P. McManus	14	2nd. (3 1/2 L) Theatreworld 16/1; 3rd. (2 1/2 L) French Holly 11/2	3:56.80
2000, 14 March	Istabraq	8/15F	8	Charlie Swan	Aidan O'Brien (IRE)	J. P. McManus	12	2nd. (4 L) Hors La Loi III 11/1; 3rd. (nk) Blue Royal 16/1	3:48.10
No race 2001 (Note: The 2001 running was cancelled because of a foot-and-mouth crisis. A substitute race at Sandown was won by Landing Light)
2002, 12 March	Hors La Loi III	10/1	7	Dean Gallagher	James Fanshawe	Paul Green	15	2nd. (3 L) Marble Arch 25/1; 3rd. (1/2 L) Bilboa 14/1	3:53.80
2003, 11 March	Rooster Booster	9/2	9	Richard Johnson	Philip Hobbs	Terry Warner	17	2nd. (11 L) Westender 33/1; 3rd. (3 L) Rhinestone Cowboy 5/2F	3:54.70
2004, 16 March	Hardy Eustace	33/1	7	Conor O'Dwyer	Dessie Hughes (IRE)	Laurence Byrne	14	2nd. (5 L) Rooster Booster 11/8F; 3rd. (4 L) Intersky Falcon 8/1	3:54.50
2005, 15 March	Hardy Eustace	7/2 JF	8	Conor O'Dwyer	Dessie Hughes (IRE)	Laurence Byrne	14	2nd. (nk) Harchibald 7/1; 3rd. (nk) Brave Inca 10/1	3:51.50
2006, 14 March	Brave Inca	7/4F	8	Tony McCoy	Colm Murphy (IRE)	Novices Syndicate	18	2nd. (1 L) Macs Joy 13/2; 3rd. (3 1/2 L) Hardy Eustace 11/2	3:50.00
2007, 13 March	Sublimity	16/1	7	Philip Carberry	John Carr (IRE)	Bill Hennessy	10	2nd. (3 L) Brave Inca 11/2; 3rd. (nk) Afsoun 28/1	3:55.70
2008, 11 March	Katchit	10/1	5	Robert Thornton	Alan King	D S J P Syndicate	15	2nd. (1 L) Osana 9/2; 3rd. (5 L) Punjabi 28/1	4:08.10
2009, 10 March	Punjabi	22/1	6	Barry Geraghty	Nicky Henderson	Raymond Tooth	23	2nd. (nk) Celestial Halo 17/2; 3rd. (hd) Binocular 6/4F	4:00.90
2010, 16 March	Binocular	9/1	6	Tony McCoy	Nicky Henderson	J. P. McManus	12	2nd. (3 1/2 L) Khyber Kim 7/1; 3rd. (6 L) Zaynar 15/2	3:53.80
2011, 15 March	Hurricane Fly	11/4F	7	Ruby Walsh	Willie Mullins (IRE)	Creighton / Boyd	11	2nd. (1 1/4 L) Peddlers Cross 9/2; 3rd. (5 L) Oscar Whisky 7/1	3:53.71
2012, 13 March	Rock On Ruby	11/1	7	Noel Fehily	Paul Nicholls	The Festival Goers	10	2nd. (3 3/4 L) Overturn 9/2; 3rd. (1 3/4 L) Hurricane Fly 4/6F	3:50.10
2013, 12 March	Hurricane Fly	13/8F	9	Ruby Walsh	Willie Mullins (IRE)	Creighton / Boyd	9	2nd. (2 1/2 L) Rock On Ruby 11/2; 3rd. (1 3/4 L) Countrywide Flame 16/1	3:59.35
2014, 11 March	Jezki	9/1	6	Barry Geraghty	Jessica Harrington (IRE)	J. P. McManus	9	2nd. (nk) My Tent Or Yours 3/1; 3rd. (2 1/2 L) The New One 100/30	3:45.25
2015, 10 March	Faugheen	4/5F	7	Ruby Walsh	Willie Mullins (IRE)	Susannah Ricci	8	2nd. (1 1/2 L) Arctic Fire 20/1; 3rd. (5 L) Hurricane Fly 8/1	3:50.90
2016, 15 March	Annie Power†	5/2F	8	Ruby Walsh	Willie Mullins (IRE)	Susannah Ricci	12	2nd. (4 1/2 L) My Tent or Yours 10/1; 3rd. (hd) Nichols Canyon 15/2	3:45.10
2017, 14 March	Buveur d'Air	5/1	6	Noel Fehily	Nicky Henderson	J. P. McManus	11	2nd. (4 1/2 L) My Tent or Yours 16/1; 3rd. (3 L) Petit Mouchoir 6/1	3:50.90
2018, 13 March	Buveur d'Air	4/6F	7	Barry Geraghty	Nicky Henderson	J. P. McManus	11	2nd. (nk) Melon 7/1; 3rd. (3 L) Mick Jazz 25/1	4:05.00
2019, 12 March	Espoir d'Allen	16/1	5	Mark Walsh	Gavin Cromwell (IRE)	J. P. McManus	10	2nd. (15 L) Melon 20/1; 3rd. (nk) Silver Streak 80/1	3:59.07
2020, 10 March	Epatante†	2/1F	6	Barry Geraghty	Nicky Henderson	J. P. McManus	17	2nd. (3 L) Sharjah 16/1; 3rd. (3 3/4 L) Darver Star 17/2	4:07.03
2021, 16 March	Honeysuckle†	11/10F	7	Rachael Blackmore	Henry de Bromhead (IRE)	Kenny Alexander	10	2nd. (6 L) Sharjah 11/1; 3rd. (3 L) Epatante 4/1	3:54.63
2022, 15 March	Honeysuckle†	8/11F	8	Rachael Blackmore	Henry de Bromhead (IRE)	Kenny Alexander	10	2nd. (3½ L) Epatante 16/1; 3rd. (2 3/4L) Saint Roi 33/1	3:50.13
2023, 14 March	Constitution Hill	4/11F	6	Nico de Boinville	Nicky Henderson	Michael Buckley	7	2nd. (9 L) State Man 7/2; 3rd. (4 L) Zanahiyr 66/1	3:59.38
2024, 12 March	State Man	2/5F	7	Paul Townend	Willie Mullins (IRE)	Mrs J Donnelly	12	2nd. (1 1/4 L) Irish Point 9/2; 3rd. (4 1/4 L) Luccia 33/1	4:13.88
2025, 11 March	Golden Ace†	25/1	7	Lorcan Williams	Jeremy Scott	Ian Gosden	7	2nd. (9 L) Burdett Road 66/1; 3rd. (10 1/2L) Winter Fog 150/1	3:56.12
2026, 10 March	Lossiemouth †	7/5F	7	Paul Townend	Willie Mullins (IRE)	Susannah Ricci	9	2nd. (6 1/2 L) Brighterdaysahead 7/2; 3rd. (1/2 L) The New Lion 3/1	3:54.24

== See also ==
- Horse racing in Great Britain
- List of British National Hunt races

== Bibliography ==
- The Breedon Book of Horse Racing Records. Breedon Books. 1993. p. 229. ISBN 1-873626-15-0.
- Horse Racing The Records. Guinness Superlatives Ltd. 1985. pp. 78–83. ISBN 0851124461.
