= Make A Stand (horse) =

British-bred Thoroughbred racehorse

- Sire: Master Willie
- Dam: Make A Signal
- Damsire: Royal Gunner
- Sex: Gelding
- Foaled: 21 March 1991
- Country: Great Britain
- Colour: Chestnut
- Breeder: R M West
- Owner: Robert Barnett; Henry Candy; Kingstone Warren Partners; Peter Deal (from September 1995)
- Trainer: Henry Candy; Martin Pipe
- Record: 30: 12-3-1
- Earnings: £290,026

Major wins
- William Hill Handicap Hurdle (1996); Kennel Gate Novices' Hurdle (1996); Lanzarote Hurdle (1997); Tote Gold Trophy (1997); Champion Hurdle (1997)

Make A Stand (21 March 1991 – 22 November 2019) was a British thoroughbred racehorse. In a career which lasted from 1993 to 2000, he ran thirty times, both on the flat and over hurdles, and won twelve races. His greatest success came in the 1996–1997 National Hunt season when he won nine races, including the 1997 Champion Hurdle.

== Background ==
Make A Stand, a chestnut with a broad white blaze, was bred by R M West in 1991. His sire was the Derby runner-up Master Willie. Originally sent into training with Henry Candy in Oxfordshire, his best performances came after he was bought out of a claimer in 1995 and joined the stable of Martin Pipe.

== Racing career ==
=== 1993-1995: Flat racing ===
Making his debut in 1993, Make A Stand raced on the flat for three seasons. His only wins in twelve starts came in a maiden race at Newmarket in 1993 and a low-grade claiming event at Leicester two years later. Bought for £8,000 he was transferred to the Nicholashayne stable of Martin Pipe in September 1995.

=== 1995/6 National Hunt season ===
His career as a jumper began with a remote ninth in a Novices' Hurdle at Exeter in October, although the fact that he was sent off 15/8 second favourite suggested than he had shown some potential. He was not seen on the course again for almost six months.

=== 1996/7 National Hunt season ===
Beginning in May 1996, Make A Stand put together a sequence which saw him racing fifteen times in ten months, winning ten races and improving by fifty pounds on the way to the Championship. He took the lead from the start and generally stayed there. He began with a hat-trick of wins in the space of twenty-four days, by an aggregate margin of thirty-six lengths. Because the wins took place after 1 May, his novice status for the following season was not affected. Returning to the flat in the summer of 1996, he recorded a win and two places from four starts.

When the jumps season began in earnest in autumn, Make A Stand's career resumed where it had left off in May, with the gelding carrying top weight to an easy victory in a Stratford handicap, but he was well-beaten in his next two starts. Next time out, he led all the way to beat a high-quality field of experienced hurdlers in the William Hill Handicap Hurdle at Sandown. Two weeks later, he won the Grade II Kennel Gate Novices' Hurdle at Ascot by five lengths and in January, he led from the start to win unchallenged in the Lanzarote Hurdle. A large rise in the weights made no difference as he then produced his best performance yet under 159 pounds in the Tote Gold Trophy. His run was described as an "astonishing display" as he "obliterated" the other runners to win by nine lengths. Pipe described him after the race as "a very good, tough horse, a real athlete". Tony Stafford, writing in the Sunday Telegraph called it "the most remarkable handicap performance in any hurdle race of my experience".

At Cheltenham, he was sent off at 7-1 for the Champion Hurdle, against a field that brought together the best hurdlers in Britain and Ireland. Adopting his usual front-running tactics, he came home a five-length winner from Theatreworld. Alastair Down, writing in the Sporting Life, described the performance as "a remorseless display of speed and precision hurdling", while Theatreworld's jockey, Norman Williamson said of the winner, "He is a true champion - he just annihilates you with his speed".

=== Later career ===
It seemed likely that Make A Stand was at the beginning of a long career as a top hurdler: in fact, he never won again. Three weeks later, he attempted to make all the running in the Aintree Hurdle but tired into third in the straight and finished lame. Injury problems then interrupted his career, and he was not seen on the racecourse for almost three years. On his next and final start, he took the early lead in the 2000 Champion Hurdle but soon tired and finished tailed-off behind Istabraq. His retirement was finally announced in February 2001. Pipe said, "He looks wonderful...he just seems to have lost his enthusiasm".

== Retirement ==
After his retirement Make A Stand was retrained by the charity Retraining of Racehorses and became a hunter. He took part in a parade of former champions at the 2010 Cheltenham Festival. His death at the age of 28 was announced on 22 November 2019.

== Pedigree ==
Pedigree of Make A Stand (GB), chestnut gelding, 1991
Sire Master Willie (GB) 1977	High Line; 1966	High Hat	Hyperion
Sire Master Willie (GB) 1977	High Line; 1966	High Hat	Madonna
Sire Master Willie (GB) 1977	High Line; 1966	Time Call	Chanteur
Sire Master Willie (GB) 1977	High Line; 1966	Time Call	Aleria
Sire Master Willie (GB) 1977	Fair Winter; 1964	Set Fair	Denturius
Sire Master Willie (GB) 1977	Fair Winter; 1964	Set Fair	Ria Geno
Sire Master Willie (GB) 1977	Fair Winter; 1964	Winter Gleam	Aureole
Sire Master Willie (GB) 1977	Fair Winter; 1964	Winter Gleam	Red Winter
Dam Make A Signal (GB) 1973	Royal Gunner; 1962	Royal Charger	Nearco
Dam Make A Signal (GB) 1973	Royal Gunner; 1962	Royal Charger	Sun Princess
Dam Make A Signal (GB) 1973	Royal Gunner; 1962	Levee	Hill Prince
Dam Make A Signal (GB) 1973	Royal Gunner; 1962	Levee	Bourtai
Dam Make A Signal (GB) 1973	Look Out; 1961	Vimy	Wild Risk
Dam Make A Signal (GB) 1973	Look Out; 1961	Vimy	Mimi
Dam Make A Signal (GB) 1973	Look Out; 1961	Visor	Combat
Dam Make A Signal (GB) 1973	Look Out; 1961	Visor	Eyewash (Family: 6-e)
