= See You Then =

British-bred Thoroughbred racehorse

- Sire: Royal Palace
- Dam: Melodina
- Damsire: Tudor Melody
- Sex: Gelding
- Foaled: 28 April 1980
- Country: England
- Colour: Brown
- Breeder: Ribblesdale Stud
- Owner: The Stype Wood Stud Ltd
- Trainer: Nicky Henderson

Major wins
- HSS Hire Shops Hurdle (1984); Champion Hurdle (1985, 1986, 1987); Oteley Hurdle (1986)

See You Then (1980–2011) was an English bred racehorse who won the Champion Hurdle three times. He is one of only five horses to achieve this feat. His career over hurdles consisted of fifteen races, of which he won ten. He had suspect tendons throughout his career which made it difficult to keep him sound. His lack of racecourse appearances eventually earned him the nickname in some quarters of 'See You When'.

== Background ==
See You Then was bred in Yorkshire, England, by the Ribblesdale Stud. His sire Royal Palace was a top class flat horse whose victories included the 1967 Epsom Derby. His dam Melodina, was a high class two year old in 1970. See You Then was sold for 17,000 guineas as a yearling before going into training with Con Collins in Ireland.

== 1983/84 season ==
Prior to making his hurdling debut at Naas, in January 1984, See You Then had run eight times on the flat in Ireland, winning on four occasions. He was successful in the Naas race, then followed up with another victory in a seventeen runner race at Punchestown. He was visually impressive in this race, travelling with ease before quickening past the leaders and winning comfortably. Shortly before the Punchestown race, he had been purchased by the Stype Wood Stud Ltd, with the intention of continuing his career in Italy. He temporarily moved to Nicky Henderson's Lambourn stable in England. During this first stay with Henderson, he ran once when starting favourite for the Triumph Hurdle at Cheltenham, the main championship race for juvenile hurdlers. In a thirty-runner field, See You Then finished second, beaten two lengths by Northern Game after holding every chance. See You Then was then transferred to Italy where he won a hurdle race in Milan. It was then announced that he would be returning to England to continue his career with Henderson.

== 1984/85 season ==
See You Then won three of his five starts during this season. On his first outing in November, he finished third to Ra Nova in the Gerry Feilden Hurdle at Newbury. The following month he won the HSS Hire Shops Hurdle at Ascot. The third placed horse in that event was Desert Orchid, who re-opposed See You Then in the Christmas Hurdle at Kempton Park. Both found the Monica Dickinson-trained Browne's Gazette too good. The winner won by fifteen lengths, with a further ten lengths separating Desert Orchid and See You Then in second and third places respectively. See You Then was then tried beyond two miles for the first time at Doncaster in February, where he won the Balmoral Hurdle. Fourteen runners lined up for the 1984 Champion Hurdle. See You Then started at 16/1. Browne's Gazette went off the 4/6 favourite ahead of the 1983 winner of the event, the Mercy Rimell-trained Gaye Brief, who started at 3/1. Ridden by Steve Smith Eccles, who was replacing the injured John Francome, See You Then travelled comfortably throughout the race, moved up to challenge at the last hurdle, then sprinted away to beat outsider Robin Wonder by seven lengths without his jockey needing to pick up his whip. Although See You Then was impressive in victory, the race is often best known for the incident at the start when Browne's Gazette swerved as the tapes went up and lost all chance of winning. He eventually finished sixth. See You Then did not reappear after Cheltenham. He ended the season with a Timeform Rating of 166p, which was 6 pounds behind the organisation's top rated hurdler of the season, Browne's Gazette.

== 1985/86 season ==
See You Then ran only three times during this season, winning twice. He did not reappear until February, when he won the Oteley Hurdle at Sandown Park, beating the 1983 Sun Alliance Novice Hurdle winner Sabin Du Loir who was returning from a long absence. His next race was a defence of his Champion Hurdle crown. In a twenty three runner field, See You Then started the 5/6 favourite, ahead of the Martin Pipe-trained Corporal Clinger who started at 11/1. Kesslin and Gaye Brief came next in the betting. See You Then's stable companion First Bout, who had won the 1985 Triumph Hurdle, also made the line up. Missing was Browne's Gazette, who had collapsed and died in the Fighting Fifth Hurdle at Newcastle, back in November. See You Then won easily again, beating Gaye Brief by seven lengths, with the Peter Easterby-trained Nohalmdun a further length and a half away in third. His now regular rider Steve Smith Eccles recounted, "The race gave me no worries at all. I managed to keep See You Then clear of the pack, cruised up behind Gaye Brief going to the last and let him sprint away up the hill with that devastating turn of foot that marks him as a true champion". See You Then's last run was his only career appearance at Aintree. Stepping up in distance to two miles and five furlongs in the Sandeman Aintree Hurdle, he could not overhaul Aonoch and was beaten a length. The winner had previously finished well behind in the Champion Hurdle. See You Then ended the season as Timeform's top rated hurdler, with a rating of 173.

== 1986/87 season ==
See You Then appeared just twice, winning both races. A series of physical problems resulted in him reappearing only a week and a half before the Champion Hurdle. This came in the De Veres Hotel Hurdle at Haydock Park, where he beat his three rivals. Recounting the race, Timeform stated that, "since See You Then carried an unusual amount of condition for him it was reasonable to assume he would improve significantly for the outing, though he didn't blow particularly hard in the unsaddling enclosure." See You Then faced seventeen rivals at Cheltenham. He started favourite at 11/10, ahead of Nohalmdun, the North American champion Flatterer, and Corporal Clinger. As in the previous runnings, See You Then travelled smoothly and moved up to challenge at the last. He landed ahead and quickly opened up a gap over Barnbrook Again. However, he began to tire halfway up the run in and at the line was fully stretched to hold on by a length and a half from the Jerry Fishback-ridden Flatterer. Barnbrook Again was close behind in third. In winning the Champion Hurdle for the third successive time, See You Then joined the select band of Hatton's Grace, Sir Ken and Persian War. Istabraq would later join the list. See You Then again ended the season as Timeform's top-rated hurdler, achieving the same rating as in the previous season of 173.

== 1987/88 season ==
Connections of See You Then had begun the season with hopes of having the first horse to win the Champion Hurdle four times. He appeared only once, when pulling up lame in the Kingwell Hurdle at Wincanton. After the race it was announced that he had been retired.

== 1989/90 season ==
See You Then's first retirement ended when he reappeared in February 1990, finishing sixth of eight runners behind Royal Derbi in the Listed City Trial Hurdle at Nottingham. He subsequently fell in the Kingwell Hurdle, before finishing 16th in the 1990 Champion Hurdle won by Kribensis. See You Then's final racecourse appearance came in the Scottish Champion Hurdle at Ayr in April 1990, where he finished ninth behind Sayparee.

== Retirement ==
See You Then enjoyed a long retirement at his owner's premises in Italy. He died at the age of 31, in December 2011.

== Pedigree ==
Pedigree of See You Then (GB), brown gelding, 1980
Sire Royal Palace (GB) 1964	Ballymoss (GB); 1954	Mossborough	Nearco
Sire Royal Palace (GB) 1964	Ballymoss (GB); 1954	Mossborough	All Moonshine
Sire Royal Palace (GB) 1964	Ballymoss (GB); 1954	Indian Call	Singapore
Sire Royal Palace (GB) 1964	Ballymoss (GB); 1954	Indian Call	Flittermere
Sire Royal Palace (GB) 1964	Crystal Palace (GB); 1956	Solar Slipper	Windsor Slipper
Sire Royal Palace (GB) 1964	Crystal Palace (GB); 1956	Solar Slipper	Solar Flower
Sire Royal Palace (GB) 1964	Crystal Palace (GB); 1956	Queen of Light	Borealis
Sire Royal Palace (GB) 1964	Crystal Palace (GB); 1956	Queen of Light	Picture Play
Dam Melodina (GB) 1968	Tudor Melody (GB); 1956	Tudor Minstrel	Owen Tudor
Dam Melodina (GB) 1968	Tudor Melody (GB); 1956	Tudor Minstrel	Sansonnet
Dam Melodina (GB) 1968	Tudor Melody (GB); 1956	Matelda	Dante
Dam Melodina (GB) 1968	Tudor Melody (GB); 1956	Matelda	Fairly Hot
Dam Melodina (GB) 1968	Rose of Medina (GB); 1956	Never Say Die	Nasrullah
Dam Melodina (GB) 1968	Rose of Medina (GB); 1956	Never Say Die	Singing Grass
Dam Melodina (GB) 1968	Rose of Medina (GB); 1956	Minaret	Umidwar
Dam Melodina (GB) 1968	Rose of Medina (GB); 1956	Minaret	Neolight (Family:9-c)
