= Punjabi (horse) =

British-bred Thoroughbred racehorse

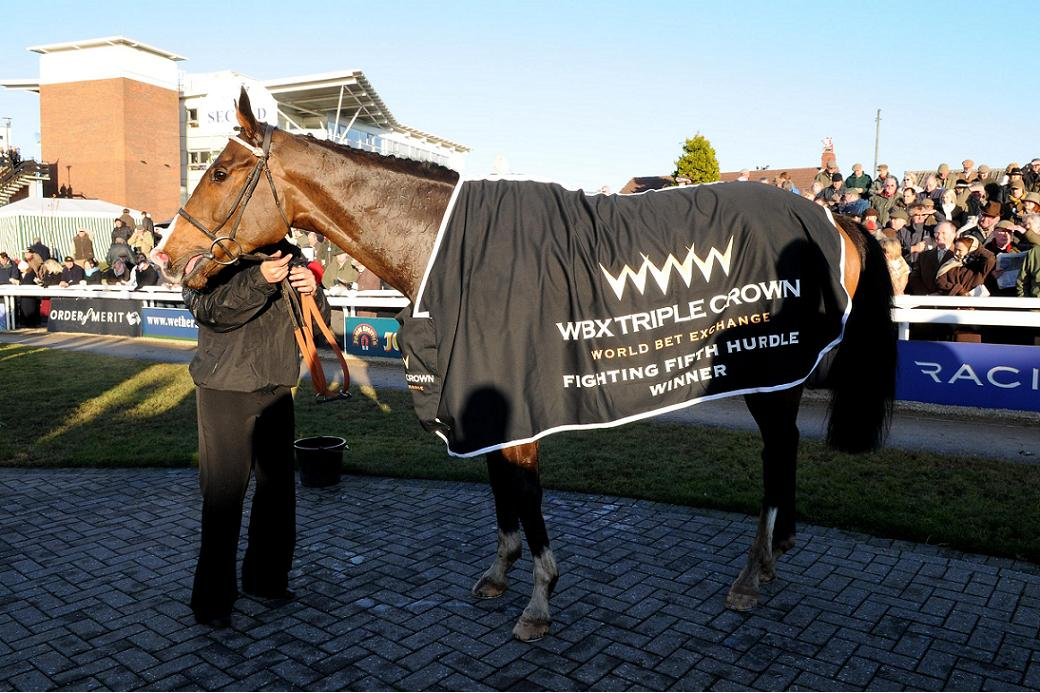
- Punjabi after winning the 2008 Fighting Fifth Hurdle
- Sire: Komaite
- Grandsire: Nureyev
- Dam: Competa
- Damsire: Hernando
- Sex: Gelding
- Foaled: 2003
- Country: Great Britain
- Colour: Bay
- Breeder: Capt. J. H. Wilson
- Owner: Raymond Tooth
- Trainer: Nicky Henderson
- Record: 12-2-4
- Earnings: £550,466

Major wins
- Punchestown Champion Four Year Old Hurdle (2007) Punchestown Champion Hurdle (2008) Fighting Fifth Hurdle (2008) Champion Hurdle (2009)

Punjabi (foaled in 2003 in Great Britain) is a British Thoroughbred racehorse, born to sire, Komatie and dam, Competa. Punjabi started racing as a three-year-old in 2005. He won his first race, a Class 6, in May 2006 at Newcastle Racecourse in Newcastle, England.

Punjabi's first notable win came in February 2007 at Kempton Park Racecourse in Surrey, England where he won the Adonis Juvenile Novices' Hurdle, a Grade 2 National Hunt race. However, it wasn't until 2008 when Punjabi started to make a name for himself, when he became the first horse to legitimately contend for the WBX sponsored Triple Crown of Hurdling. The Triple Crown of Hurdling awards a £1,000,000 bonus to the horse that wins the Fighting Fifth Hurdle at Newcastle, the Christmas Hurdle at Kempton Park and the Champion Hurdle at Cheltenham in Gloucestershire, England in the same racing season. Entering the 2008-2009 racing season, those involved with Punjabi believed their horse was a contender to win the Triple Crown of Hurdling. In early December 2008, jockey Barry Geraghty and Punjabi narrowly beat out Sublimity to win the Fighting Fifth Hurdle. Later that month, Punjabi was running well but fell two fences from the finish line at the Christmas Hurdle. The race was won by Harchibald. In March 2009, Punjabi held off a late charge by Celestial Halo to win the Champion Hurdle in a dramatic photo finish. After the win at the Champion Hurdle, trainer Nicky Henderson lamented at the fact that the fall in the Christmas Hurdle could have been "the most expensive fall in history."

In his career, Punjabi has amassed 12 wins, 2 places and 4 shows, with all four of his 12 wins coming in Grade 1 races. As of May 2009, his overall winning percentage stands at 40%.
