= 1994 Epsom Derby =

- Location: Epsom Downs Racecourse
- Date: 1 June 1994
- Winning horse: Erhaab
- Starting price: 7/2 fav
- Jockey: Willie Carson
- Trainer: John Dunlop
- Owner: Hamdan bin Rashid Al Maktoum

Epsom Derby 1994
1-2-3
Erhaab	King's Theatre	Colonel Collins

Also Ran
4-5-6
Mister Baileys	Khamaseen	Pencader
7-8-9
Golden Ball	Just Happy	Star Selection
10-11-12
Linney Head	Ionio	Chocolat De Meguro
13-14-15
Weigh Anchor	Wishing	Party Season
16-17-18
Jabaroot	Waiting	Chickawicka
19-20-21
Sunshack	The Flying Phantom	Broadway Flyer
22-23-24
Darkwood Bay	Colonel Colt	Plato's Republic
25
Foyer	25 Ran	2m 34.16s

The 1994 Epsom Derby was a horse race which took place at Epsom Downs on Wednesday 1 June 1994. It was the 215th running of the Derby, and it was won by the pre-race favourite Erhaab. The winner was ridden by Willie Carson and trained by John Dunlop.

== Race details ==
- Sponsor: Ever Ready
- Winner's prize money: £473,080
- Going: Good
- Number of runners: 25
- Winner's time: 2m 34.16s

== Full result ==
	*	Horse	Jockey	Trainer ^{†}	SP
1		Erhaab	Willie Carson	John Dunlop	7/2 fav
2	1¼	King's Theatre	Michael Kinane	Henry Cecil	14/1
3	1½	Colonel Collins	John Reid	Peter Chapple-Hyam	10/1
4	5	Mister Baileys	Jason Weaver	Mark Johnston	14/1
5	¾	Khamaseen	Lester Piggott	John Dunlop	33/1
6	nk	Pencader	Brent Thomson	Peter Chapple-Hyam	66/1
7	5	Golden Ball	Kevin Darley	Michael Stoute	50/1
8	1½	Just Happy	Walter Swinburn	Michael Stoute	50/1
9	nk	Star Selection	Alan Munro	Paul Cole	100/1
10	hd	Linney Head	Frankie Dettori	John Gosden	8/1
11	nk	Ionio	Michael Roberts	Clive Brittain	50/1
12	4	Chocolat de Meguro	Ray Cochrane	Guy Harwood	40/1
13	1¼	Weigh Anchor	Cash Asmussen	Ian Balding	10/1
14	4	Wishing	Billy Newnes	Richard Hannon, Sr.	100/1
15	6	Party Season	Kieren Fallon	Charles Cyzer	50/1
16	¾	Jabaroot	Bruce Raymond	Michael Stoute	200/1
17	1¼	Waiting	Richard Quinn	Paul Cole	16/1
18	shd	Chickawicka	John Carroll	Rod Millman	200/1
19	2	Sunshack	Pat Eddery	André Fabre (FR)	12/1
20	nk	The Flying Phantom	Philip Robinson	Mark Tompkins	250/1
21	2½	Broadway Flyer	Michael Hills	John Hills	6/1
22	12	Darkwood Bay	Darryll Holland	David Elsworth	100/1
23	8	Colonel Colt	Brian Rouse	Robin Dickin	500/1
24	2½	Plato's Republic	Darren Biggs	John Jenkins	500/1
UR		Foyer	Willie Ryan	Michael Stoute	20/1

* The distances between the horses are shown in lengths or shorter. shd = short-head; hd = head; nk = neck; UR = unseated rider.
† Trainers are based in Great Britain unless indicated.

== Winner's details ==
Further details of the winner, Erhaab:

- Foaled: 24 May 1991, in Kentucky, US
- Sire: Chief's Crown; Dam: Histoire (Riverman)
- Owner: Hamdan Al Maktoum
- Breeder: Shadwell Farm
- Rating in 1994 International Classifications: 126

== Form analysis ==
=== Two-year-old races ===
Notable runs by the future Derby participants as two-year-olds in 1993.

- Erhaab – 3rd Horris Hill Stakes
- King's Theatre – 1st Haynes, Hanson and Clark Stakes, 1st Racing Post Trophy
- Colonel Collins – 1st Washington Singer Stakes, 2nd Somerville Tattersall Stakes
- Mister Baileys – 1st Vintage Stakes, 6th Gimcrack Stakes, 1st Royal Lodge Stakes
- Khamaseen – 3rd Haynes, Hanson and Clark Stakes, 4th Racing Post Trophy
- Just Happy – 2nd Acomb Stakes
- Star Selection – 2nd Haynes, Hanson and Clark Stakes
- Wishing – 6th Royal Lodge Stakes
- Party Season – 4th Royal Lodge Stakes
- Chickawicka – 3rd Woodcote Stakes, 7th Chesham Stakes, 5th Racing Post Trophy
- Sunshack – 2nd Prix La Rochette, 3rd Prix de Condé, 1st Critérium de Saint-Cloud
- The Flying Phantom – 2nd Silver Tankard Stakes, 5th Zetland Stakes

=== The road to Epsom ===
Early-season appearances in 1994 and trial races prior to running in the Derby.

- Erhaab – 2nd Feilden Stakes, 1st Dante Stakes
- King's Theatre – 1st Craven Stakes, 13th 2,000 Guineas, 4th Dante Stakes
- Colonel Collins – 2nd Craven Stakes, 3rd 2,000 Guineas
- Mister Baileys – 1st 2,000 Guineas, 3rd Dante Stakes
- Khamaseen – 2nd Sandown Classic Trial
- Pencader – 7th Dante Stakes
- Just Happy – 1st Thirsk Classic Trial, 8th 2,000 Guineas
- Star Selection – 6th 2,000 Guineas
- Linney Head – 1st Sandown Classic Trial
- Ionio – 6th Newmarket Stakes
- Chocolat de Meguro – 2nd Lingfield Derby Trial
- Weigh Anchor – 3rd Feilden Stakes, 2nd Dante Stakes
- Wishing – 3rd Lingfield Derby Trial
- Party Season – 5th Dante Stakes
- Waiting – 2nd Dee Stakes
- Chickawicka – 5th Dee Stakes
- Sunshack – 3rd Prix Hocquart
- The Flying Phantom – 6th Easter Stakes, 4th Chester Vase
- Broadway Flyer – 1st Chester Vase
- Darkwood Bay – 5th Predominate Stakes
- Colonel Colt – 5th Glasgow Stakes
- Foyer – 1st Glasgow Stakes

=== Subsequent Group 1 wins ===
Group 1 / Grade I victories after running in the Derby.

- King's Theatre – King George VI and Queen Elizabeth Stakes (1994)
- Sunshack – Prix Royal-Oak (1995)
- Broadway Flyer – Sword Dancer Invitational Handicap (1996)

== Subsequent breeding careers ==
Leading progeny of participants in the 1994 Epsom Derby.

=== Sires of National Hunt horses ===
King's Theatre (2nd)

- Cue Card - 1st Betfair Chase (2013, 2015, 2016), 1st Ascot Chase (2013, 2017), 1st King George VI Chase (2015)
- The New One - 1st Aintree Hurdle (2014), 1st Baring Bingham Novices' Hurdle (2013)
- Menorah - 1st Supreme Novices' Hurdle (2010), 1st Manifesto Novices' Chase (2012)
- Fashionista - Dam of Bobs Worth (1st Cheltenham Gold Cup 2013)

Mister Baileys (4th) - Exported to America before standing in England

- Blazing Bailey - 1st World Series Hurdle (2008)

Sunshack (19th)

- Bambi du Rheu - 3rd Prix des Drags (2010)
- Sundahia - 5th Prix des Drags (2013)

Broadway Flyer (21st)

- Broadway Buffalo - 1st Tommy Whittle Chase (2014)
- Charminster - 3rd Lonesome Glory Hurdle (2016)
- Bay Pearl - Dam of Slate House (1st Kauto Star Novices' Chase 2019)

=== Other Stallions ===
Colonel Collins (3rd) - Sired useful jumps handicappers - Damsire of Frederick Engels (1st July Stakes 2011)
Erhaab (1st) - Exported to Japan - Returned to England - Sired minor winners
Khamaseen (5th) - Exported to America
Pencader (6th) - Exported to Chile
Just Happy (8th) - Exported to South Africa
Linney Head (10th) - Exported to South Africa
Chocolat de Meguro (12th) - Minor jumps winner
Waiting (17th) - Exported to Saudi Arabia
Chickawicka (18th) - Sired moderate jumps runner
Darkwood Bay (22nd) - Sired minor runners
Foyer (Unseated rider) - Exported to India
