= 2014 Cheltenham Gold Cup =

- Cheltenham Gold Cup
- Location: Cheltenham Racecourse
- Date: 14 March 2014
- Winning horse: Lord Windermere
- Starting price: 20/1
- Jockey: Davy Russell
- Trainer: Jim Culloty
- Owner: Dr. Ronan Lambe
- Conditions: Good

The 2014 Cheltenham Gold Cup (known as the Betfred Gold Cup for sponsorship reasons) was the 86th annual running of the Cheltenham Gold Cup horse race and was held at Cheltenham Racecourse on Friday 14 March 2014.

== Build-up ==
A total of 36 entries were received for the race with 2013 winner Bobs Worth the 2/1 favourite, and 2013 King George VI Chase winner Silviniaco Conti at 7/2 second favourite.

The race was shown live on Channel 4 in the UK and Ireland.

== Full result ==
	*	Horse	Age	Jockey	Trainer ^{†}	SP
1		Lord Windermere	8	Davy Russell	Jim Culloty (Ire)	20/1
2	shd	On His Own	7	David Casey	Willie Mullins (Ire)	16/1
3	3/4	The Giant Bolster	8	Tom Scudamore	David Bridgwater	14/1
4	1	Silviniaco Conti	8	Noel Fehily	Paul Nicholls	11/4
5	2 1/4	Bobs Worth	9	Barry Geraghty	Nicky Henderson	6/4 F
6	2 3/4	Lyreen Legend	7	Paul Carberry	Dessie Hughes (Ire)	33/1
7	11	Knockara Beau	11	George Charlton	Jan Faltejsek	66/1
8	3 1/4	Teaforthree	10	Nick Scholfield	Rebecca Curtis	33/1
9	3	Houblon Des Obeux	7	Liam Treadwell	Venetia Williams	50/1
10	6	Triolo D'alene	7	AP McCoy	Nicky Henderson	10/1
11	4 1/2	Katenko	8	Aidan Coleman	Venetia Williams	66/1
UR		Cloudy Too	8	Jonathan England	Sue Smith	50/1
UR		Last Instalment	9	Brian O'Connell	Philip Fenton	15/2

* The distances between the horses are shown in lengths or shorter. shd = short-head.
† Trainers are based in Great Britain unless indicated. PU = pulled-up. NR = non runner. UR = Unseated Rider.

== Race ==
The race was won by 20/1 outsider Lord Windermere who won by a short head from On His Own after a stewards inquiry. Stewards admitted that the runner-up, On His Own, had been impeded, but ruled it was minor interference that did not affect the result.

== Result after stewards inquiry ==
- 1. Lord Windermere: Jockey (Davy Russell), Trainer (Jim Culloty)
- 2. On His Own: Jockey (David Casey), Trainer (Willie Mullins)

== Details ==
- Sponsor: Betfred
- Winner's prize money: £327,325.82
- Going:Good
- Number of runners:13
- Winner's time:6m 43.88s

== See also ==
- Horseracing in Great Britain
- List of British National Hunt races
- 2014 Grand National
