= Wichita Lineman (disambiguation) =

"Wichita Lineman" is a song written by Jimmy Webb and first recorded in 1968 by Glen Campbell.

Wichita Lineman may also refer to:

- Wichita Lineman (album), a 1968 album by Glen Campbell
- Wichita Lineman (horse), National Hunt racehorse
