= Sunshack =

British Thoroughbred racehorse

- Sire: Rainbow Quest
- Grandsire: Blushing Groom
- Dam: Suntrap
- Damsire: Roberto
- Sex: Stallion
- Foaled: 8 February 1991
- Country: United Kingdom
- Colour: Bay
- Breeder: Juddmonte Farms
- Owner: Khalid Abdullah
- Trainer: André Fabre; Robert J. Frankel
- Record: 18: 6-5-4
- Earnings: £397,260

Major wins
- Critérium de Saint-Cloud (1993); Prix du Conseil de Paris (1994); Prix Jean de Chaudenay (1995); Coronation Cup (1995); Prix Royal-Oak (1995)

Sunshack (foaled 8 February 1991) is a British-bred Thoroughbred racehorse and sire who was trained in France and the United States. He showed very good form as a two-year-old in 1993 when he won two of his four races including the Critérium de Saint-Cloud. In the following year he struggled for form before ending his season with a win in the Prix du Conseil de Paris. He reached his peak as a four-year-old in 1995 when he won the Prix Jean de Chaudenay, defeated a world-class field in the Coronation Cup and then stepped up in distance to take the Prix Royal-Oak. His later career was limited by injury and he failed to win again. He stood as a breeding stallion in Japan and France with very little success.

== Background ==
Sunshack was a dark bay horse with a small white star bred in England by his owner Khalid Abdullah's Juddmonte Farms. He was sired by Rainbow Quest who won the Prix de l'Arc de Triomphe before becoming a very successful breeding stallion. Rainbow Quest's other progeny included Quest for Fame, Saumarez, Raintrap, Nedawi, Armiger, Spectrum and Millenary. Sunshack's dam Suntrap was a successful racemare who won three minor races and finished third in both the Prix d'Aumale and the Lupe Stakes. As a broodmare she had previously produced Sunshack's full-brother Raintrap.

Sunshack was sent into training with André Fabre in France.

== Racing career ==
=== 1993: two-year-old season ===
Sunshack made a successful debut in the Prix de Fontenoy over 1600 metres at Longchamp Racecourse on 5 September 1993, beating Goldmine by a short head. He was stepped up to Group Three class for his next two races and ran well in defeat, finishing second to Chimes Band when 7/10 favourite for the Prix La Rochette and third behind Celtic Arms and Three Angels in the Prix de Condé. He had been ridden by Pat Eddery in his first three races but Thierry Jarnet took over the ride in the Group One Critérium de Saint-Cloud over 2000 metres on 31 October. Racehorses in France are coupled for betting purposes and Sunshack was part of a two-horse Khalid Abdullah entry alongside the Prix Saint-Roman winner Zindari. Racing on soft ground he won by four lengths from Zindari with Tikkanen in third.

=== 1994: three-year-old season ===
On his first appearance of 1994, Sunshack started favourite for the Prix Hocquart over 2400 metres at Longchamp but was beaten into third by Vadlawys and Fair Fabulous in a close finish. On 1 June he was the only French challenger for the 215th Epsom Derby and started the 12/1 sixth choice in the betting in a twenty-five-runner field. He was never in contention and finished nineteenth, thirty-five lengths behind the winner Erhaab. After a break of more than three months he returned for the Prix Niel at Longchamp in September and finished third behind his stablemates Carnegie and Northern Spur. On his fourth and final appearance of the season he was matched against older horses for the first time in the Prix du Conseil de Paris on 16 October. Ridden by Eddery he started the 1.7/1 favourite ahead of the German champion Monsun in a field which also included Red Bishop (later to win the Hong Kong Vase) and Rainbow Dancer. After racing towards the rear of the six-runner field he took the lead 200 metres from the finish and won by half a length and a neck from Monsun and Red Bishop.

=== 1995: four-year-old season ===
Sunshack began his third season in the Prix d'Hédouville over 2400 metres at Longchamp on 27 April in which he was ridden by Jarnet and started 4/5 favourite. He was held up at the rear of the six-runner field and although he made some progress in the straight he looked outpaced by his main rivals and finished fourth behind Tot Ou Tard. On 23 May he was made 11/10 favourite for the Group Two Prix Jean de Chaudenay at Saint-Cloud Racecourse. With Jarnet in the saddle he turned into the straight in third place but looked to be outpaced once again before staying on in the closing stages, overtaking the leader Sand Reef 100 metres from the finish and winning by three quarters of a length.

A year after his first, unsuccessful, visit to Epsom Racecourse, Sunshack returned to the English track for the Coronation Cup over one and a half miles on 10 June when he was part of a very strong French challenge. Tikkanen started favourite ahead of Carnegie and Only Royale with Sunshack fourth in the betting on 10/1. The other three runners were Time Star (Derby Italiano), Environment Friend and Ionio. After disputing the early lead he settled behind the leaders by Pat Eddery and turned into the straight in fifth place. He began to make steady progress, overtook the leader Time Star approaching the final furlong and held off the sustained challenge of Only Royale to win by a head. In the Grand Prix de Saint-Cloud three weeks later he was unable to reproduce his Epsom form as he finished fifth behind Carnegie, Luso, Only Royale and Tikkanen.

After a break of three and a half months, Sunshack returned in the Group One Prix Royal-Oak over 3100 metres on firm ground at Longchamp on 22 October and started odds-on favourite ahead of Assessor, a British stayer whose wins included the Doncaster Cup, Prix du Cadran and the 1992 Prix Royal-Oak. The other runners were Tot Ou Tard, Sunrise Song (Prix de Pomone), Peckinpah's Soul (Prix Kergorlay), Patripral (Prix Maurice de Nieuil) and Shrewd Idea. Ridden by Jarnet, he raced in fifth place as Shrewd Idea set the pace before making progress in the straight and taking the lead 300 metres from the finish. He drew away in the closing stages and won by two and a half lengths from Shrewd Idea with Sunrise Song a short neck away in third place.

=== 1996 – 1997: later career ===
In 1996 Sunshack made only two appearances, ridden on both occasions by Sylvain Guillot. In August, after an absence of more than nine months, he was beaten a short head by Water Poet in the Listed Prix de Reux at Deauville Racecourse. On 1 September he was sent to Germany for the Grosser Preis von Baden and finished third behind Pilsudski and Germany.

In 1997 Sunshack was transferred to race in the United States and entered the stable of Bobby Frankel in California. He failed to win but ran prominently in defeat on his only three North American starts. He finished second to Marlin in both the San Luis Rey Handicap and the San Juan Capistrano Handicap at Santa Anita Park and then ran second to Rainbow Dancer in the Hollywood Turf Cup.

== Stud record ==
At the end of his racing career Sunshack become a breeding stallion. He was based in Japan from 1998 until 2003 and sired numerous minor winners but no top class performers. He then returned to France and became a sire of jumpers.

== Pedigree ==
Pedigree of Sunshack (GB), bay stallion, 1991
Sire Rainbow Quest (USA) 1981	Blushing Groom (FR); 1974	Red God	Nasrullah
Sire Rainbow Quest (USA) 1981	Blushing Groom (FR); 1974	Red God	Spring Run
Sire Rainbow Quest (USA) 1981	Blushing Groom (FR); 1974	Runaway Bride	Wild Risk
Sire Rainbow Quest (USA) 1981	Blushing Groom (FR); 1974	Runaway Bride	Aimee
Sire Rainbow Quest (USA) 1981	I Will Follow (USA); 1975	Herbager	Vandale
Sire Rainbow Quest (USA) 1981	I Will Follow (USA); 1975	Herbager	Flagette
Sire Rainbow Quest (USA) 1981	I Will Follow (USA); 1975	Where You Lead	Raise a Native
Sire Rainbow Quest (USA) 1981	I Will Follow (USA); 1975	Where You Lead	Noblesse
Dam Suntrap (USA) 1983	Roberto (USA); 1969	Hail To Reason	Turn-To
Dam Suntrap (USA) 1983	Roberto (USA); 1969	Hail To Reason	Nothirdchance
Dam Suntrap (USA) 1983	Roberto (USA); 1969	Bramalea	Nashua
Dam Suntrap (USA) 1983	Roberto (USA); 1969	Bramalea	Rarelea
Dam Suntrap (USA) 1983	Sunny Bay (USA); 1975	Northern Bay	Northern Dancer
Dam Suntrap (USA) 1983	Sunny Bay (USA); 1975	Northern Bay	Wendasy
Dam Suntrap (USA) 1983	Sunny Bay (USA); 1975	Staunch Lady	Staunchness
Dam Suntrap (USA) 1983	Sunny Bay (USA); 1975	Staunch Lady	Fee Fee Girl (Family: 1-n)
