= Old Vic (horse) =

British-bred Thoroughbred racehorse (1986–2011)

- Sire: Sadler's Wells
- Grandsire: Northern Dancer
- Dam: Cockade
- Damsire: Derring-Do
- Sex: Stallion
- Foaled: 26 April 1986
- Died: 21 February 2011 (aged 24)
- Country: Great Britain
- Colour: Bay
- Breeder: Stowell Hill Ltd
- Owner: Sheikh Mohammed
- Trainer: Henry Cecil
- Record: 9: 6-1-1
- Earnings: £708,046

Major wins
- Sandown Classic Trial (1989); Chester Vase (1989); Prix du Jockey Club (1989); Irish Derby (1989)

Awards
- Leading jump racing sire in GB & Ireland (2007-08); Timeform rating: 136
- Last updated on 28 July 2022

Old Vic (26 April 1986 – 21 February 2011) was a British-bred Thoroughbred racehorse who won the French Derby and the Irish Derby in 1989. After retiring from racing he went on to become a top national hunt sire. He was one of the first crop of foals by the influential sire Sadler's Wells.

== Racing career ==
Old Vic made his racecourse debut in a maiden at Newmarket in September 1988 and finished sixth. He started once more as a two-year-old, winning a maiden at Haydock Park. He easily won the Burghclere Stakes at Newbury on his first race of 1989. He then stepped up in class for the Sandown Classic Trial. He faced only two opponents and won the race by four lengths. He followed this up with a win in the Chester Vase at the May meeting. Old Vic then travelled to France for the Prix du Jockey Club. He quickened clear with two furlongs to run and was never challenged, winning by seven lengths from Dancehall. After this performance, he started the hot favourite for the Irish Derby and won by four lengths despite the presence of a large abscess in the saddle area and the need to have foam pads under the saddle to enable him to run.

Old Vic raced as a four-year-old, beginning at Royal Ascot where he started the 4/5 favourite in the Hardwicke Stakes. He finished third, a long way behind the surprise winner Assatis. Old Vic's final start came in the King George VI and Queen Elizabeth Stakes. He led from the start but was overtaken by Belmez with two furlongs to run. Old Vic came back at Belmez again and just failed to win by a neck. The field also included In the Wings and Assatis.

== Assessment ==
At the end of the 1989 season Old Vic was officially rated as the joint best horse with Zilzal. Timeform gave Zilzal a rating of 137, with Old Vic on 136 and Nashwan on 135. Old Vic was also officially rated the best older horse of the 1990 season.

== Stud career ==
Old Vic was retired to stud. He failed to produce many top class flat horses, the best being multiple Group 3 winner Orchestra Stall. However he went on to become one of the leading National Hunt sires and was leading sire for the 2007/08 season.

=== Notable progeny ===
c = colt, f = filly

Foaled	Name	Sex	Major Wins
1998	Kicking King	c	John Durkan Memorial Chase, King George VI Chase (twice), Cheltenham Gold Cup, Punchestown Gold Cup
1998	Our Vic	c	Ascot Chase, Ryanair Chase, totesport Bowl
1998	Snoopy Loopy	c	Betfair Chase
1999	Comply or Die	c	Grand National
2000	Don't Push It	c	Grand National
2000	In Compliance	c	John Durkan Memorial Chase
2001	One Cool Cookie	c	Powers Gold Cup

Old Vic was euthanized on 21 February 2011.
