= Challow Novices' Hurdle =

Hurdle horse race in Britain

- Class: Grade 1
- Location: Newbury Racecourse; Newbury, England
- Race type: Hurdle race
- Sponsor: Ladbrokes Coral
- Website: Newbury

Race information
- Distance: 2m 4f 118y (4,131 metres)
- Surface: Turf
- Track: Left-handed
- Qualification: Four-years-old and up
- Weight: 11 st 7 lb; Allowances; 7 lb for fillies and mares
- Purse: £100,000 (2025); 1st: £56,950

Challow Novices' Hurdle
2025
No Drama This End	Klimt Madrik	Tiptoptim

Previous years
2024
The New Lion	Wendigo	Bill Joyce
2023
Captain Teague	Lookaway	The Jukebox Man
2022
Hermes Allen	You Wear It Well	Idalko Bihoue
2021
Stage Star	West Balboa	Gringo D'aubrelle

2020-2011
2020
Bravemansgame	Star Gate	The Glancing Queen
2019
Thyme Hill	The Cashel Man	Enrilo
2018
Champ	Getaway Trump	Kateson
2017
Poetic Rhythm	Mulcahys Hill	Kilbricken Storm
2016
Messire Des Obeaux	Baltazar D'allier	Ami Desbois
2015
Barters Hill	Politologue	Label Des Obeaux
2014
Parlour Games	Vyta Du Roc	Blaklion
2013
Captain Cutter	Timesremembered	Oscar Rock
2012
Taquin Du Seuil	Easter Day	Ballybough Pat
2011
Fingal Bay	Ballyrock	Double Ross

2010-2001
2010
Backspin	Court in Motion	Al Ferof
2009
Reve De Sivola	Restless Harry	Finian's Rainbow
2008
Diamond Harry	Junior	Hell's Bay
2007
Souffleur	Elusive Dream	Gauvain
2006
Wichita Lineman	Sir Jimmy Shand	Roll Along
2005
Denman	The Cool Guy	Boychuk
2004
Brewster	Ladalko	Keepthedreamalive
2003
Cornish Rebel	Big Moment	Grey Report
2002
Coolnagorna	Calling Brave	Lady Laureate
2001
Classified	Too Forward	See You Sometime

2000-1993
1999
Bindaree	Barney Knows	Hati Roy
1998
King's Road	Rio's King	Storm of Gold
1994
Berude Not To	Garrylough	Court Master
1993
Large Action	Corrouge	Top Spin

The Challow Novices' Hurdle is a Grade 1 National Hunt hurdle race in Great Britain which is open to horses aged four years or older. It is run at Newbury over a distance of about 2 miles and 4½ furlongs (2 miles 4 furlongs and 118 yards, or 4,131 metres), and there are ten hurdles to be jumped. The race is for novice hurdlers, and it is scheduled to take place each year in late December. Prior to 1999 the race was sometimes run in early January. Initially contested as a two mile juvenile hurdle (restricted to horses who were three years old at the start of the season), the race was opened to older horses from the 1981–82 season onwards. After a hiatus during the mid 1990s, juvenile hurdlers are now excluded from the race.

== Records ==
Leading jockey since 1971 (6 wins):

- Tony McCoy – Classified (2001), Coolnagorna (2002), Wichita Lineman (2006), Backspin (2010), Taquin du Seuil (2012), Captain Cutter (2013)

Leading trainer since 1971 (7 wins):

- Paul Nicholls - Cornish Rebel (2003), Denman (2006), Bravemansgame (2020), Stage Star (2021), Hermes Allen (2022), Captain Teague (2023), No Drama This End (2025)

== Winners since 1970–71 ==
- actual year of race highlighted in bold – when in January, the minimum age is 5-y-o

Season	Winner	Age	Jockey	Trainer
1970–**1971**	True Luck	4	Ken White	Fred Rimell
**1971**–1972	Official	3	Clive Bailey	Toby Balding
**1972**–1973	Glorious Fifteenth	3	Terry Biddlecombe	Ron Smyth
**1973**–1974	Ashendene	3	Redvers Weaver	George Vergette
**1974**–1975	Benroy	3	David Mould	Haynes
1975–**1976**	Havanus	4	Bob Davies	David Morley
1976–**1977**	Abandoned due to frost
**1977**–1978	Pollerton	3	Steve Smith Eccles	Harry Thomson Jones
**1978**–1979	Snowtown Boy	3	Roger Rowell	Auriol Sinclair
**1979**–1980	Celtic Isle	3	Eddie Woods (Note: amateur jockey)	Fred Rimell
1980–**1981**	Highway	4	Bob Davies	David Morley
1981–**1982**	Right Regent	4	Colin Brown	David Elsworth
**1982**–1983	Ambiance	4	Peter Scudamore	Peter Bailey
**1983**–1984	Catch Phrase	5	Peter Double	Josh Gifford
**1984**–1985	The Breener	5	Simon Sherwood	Oliver Sherwood
**1985**–1986	Abandoned due to frost
1986–**1987**	Bonanza Boy	6	Peter Hobbs	Philip Hobbs
1987–**1988**	Slalom	7	John White	Michael Robinson
**1988**–1989	Green Willow	6	Peter Hobbs	Josh Gifford
**1989**–1990	Forest Sun	4	Jimmy Frost	Toby Balding
**1990**–1991	Tyrone Bridge	4	Richard Dunwoody	Martin Pipe
**1991**–1992	Lift and Load	4	Graham McCourt	Richard Hannon Sr.
1992–**1993**	Lord Relic	7	Peter Scudamore	Martin Pipe
1993–**1994**	Large Action	6	Jamie Osborne	Oliver Sherwood
**1994**–1995	Berude Not To	5	Jamie Osborne	Oliver Sherwood
**1995**–1996	Abandoned due to frost
**1996**–1997	Abandoned due to frost
1997–**1998**	Abandoned due to waterlogging
1998–**1999**	King's Road	6	Carl Llewellyn	Nigel Twiston-Davies
**1999**–2000 (Note: The 1999–00 and 2005–06 runnings took place at Cheltenham)	Bindaree	5	Carl Llewellyn	Nigel Twiston-Davies
**2000**–2001	Abandoned due to frost and snow
**2001**–2002	Classified	5	Tony McCoy	Martin Pipe
**2002**–2003	Coolnagorna	5	Tony McCoy	Jonjo O'Neill
**2003**–2004	Cornish Rebel	6	Ruby Walsh	Paul Nicholls
**2004**–2005	Brewster	7	David Dennis	Ian Williams
2005–**2006**	Denman	6	Ruby Walsh	Paul Nicholls
**2006**–2007	Wichita Lineman	5	Tony McCoy	Jonjo O'Neill
**2007**–2008	Souffleur	4	Tom O'Brien	Peter Bowen
**2008**–2009	Diamond Harry	5	Timmy Murphy	Nick Williams
**2009**–2010	Reve de Sivola	4	Daryl Jacob	Nick Williams
**2010**-2011	Backspin	5	Tony McCoy	Jonjo O'Neill
**2011**-2012	Fingal Bay	5	Richard Johnson	Philip Hobbs
**2012**-2013	Taquin du Seuil	5	Tony McCoy	Jonjo O'Neill
**2013**-2014	Captain Cutter	6	Tony McCoy	Nicky Henderson
**2014**-2015	Parlour Games	6	Noel Fehily	John Ferguson
**2015**-2016	Barters Hill	5	David Bass	Ben Pauling
**2016**-2017	Messire Des Obeaux	4	Daryl Jacob	Alan King
**2017**-2018	Poetic Rhythm	6	Paddy Brennan	Fergal O'Brien
**2018**-2019	Champ	6	Barry Geraghty	Nicky Henderson
**2019**-2020	Thyme Hill	5	Richard Johnson	Philip Hobbs
**2020**-2021	Bravemansgame	5	Harry Cobden	Paul Nicholls
**2021**-2022	Stage Star	5	Harry Cobden	Paul Nicholls
**2022**-2023	Hermes Allen	5	Harry Cobden	Paul Nicholls
**2023**-2024	Captain Teague	5	Harry Cobden	Paul Nicholls
**2024**-2025	The New Lion	5	Harry Skelton	Dan Skelton
**2025**-2026	No Drama This End	5	Harry Cobden	Paul Nicholls

== See also ==
- Horse racing in Great Britain
- List of British National Hunt races
