= Wichita Lineman (horse) =

Irish-bred Thoroughbred racehorse

- Sire: King's Theatre
- Grandsire: Sadler's Wells
- Dam: Monumental Gesture
- Damsire: Head for Heights
- Sex: Gelding
- Foaled: 18 April 2001
- Country: Ireland
- Colour: Bay
- Breeder: Pat Tobin
- Owner: Susan Magnier; J. P. McManus
- Trainer: Jonjo O'Neill
- Record: 19:9-4-0
- Earnings: £197,693

Major wins
- Challow Novices' Hurdle (2006); Classic Novices' Hurdle (2007); Spa Novices' Hurdle (2007); William Hill Trophy Handicap Chase (2009)

Wichita Lineman was a National Hunt racehorse, foaled on 18 April 2001.

He won nine of his eighteen races, finishing second in a further four. The majority of his runs were in the hands of Tony McCoy. Wichita Lineman's final win came at the 2009 Cheltenham Festival in the William Hill Trophy where he rallied from 15 to 20 lengths to win by a neck.

He was owned by J. P. McManus and trained by Jonjo O'Neill.

Wichita Lineman suffered a fatal fall, breaking his back at the first fence of the Irish Grand National on Monday 13 April 2009, aged 8 years, after carrying top weight in the race.
