= Lord Windermere =

Irish-bred Thoroughbred racehorse

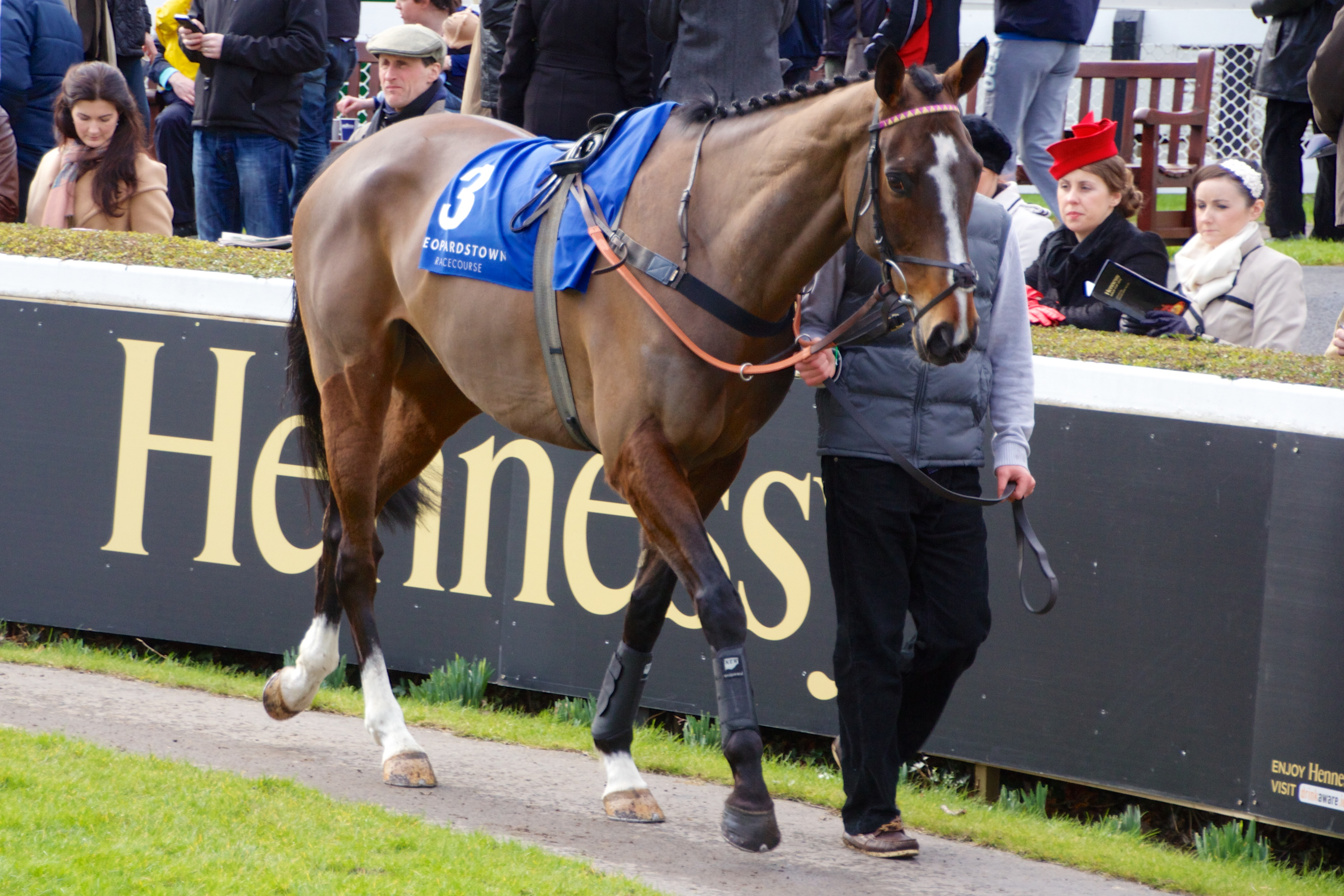
- Lord Windermere at Leopardstown in February 2013.
- Sire: Oscar
- Grandsire: Sadler's Wells
- Dam: Satellite Dancer
- Damsire: Satco
- Sex: Gelding
- Foaled: 11 March 2006
- Country: Ireland
- Colour: Bay
- Breeder: Edmond Coleman
- Owner: Ronan Lambe
- Trainer: Jim Culloty
- Record: 27:6-4-3
- Earnings: £497,694

Major wins
- RSA Chase (2013); Cheltenham Gold Cup (2014)

Lord Windermere (foaled 11 March 2006) is an Irish Thoroughbred racehorse who competed in National Hunt racing. He was a successful steeplechaser, winning the RSA Chase in 2013 and the Cheltenham Gold Cup in 2014.

== Background ==
Lord Windermere is a bay gelding with a white blaze and three white socks bred in Ireland by Edmond Coleman. He was sired by Oscar, a horse who finished second to Peintre Celebre in the Prix du Jockey Club before becoming a leading sire of National Hunt horses. His other major winners have included Big Zeb (Queen Mother Champion Chase), Rock On Ruby (Champion Hurdle), Oscar Whisky (Aintree Hurdle), Peddlers Cross (Baring Bingham Novices' Hurdle), Black Jack Ketchum (Sefton Novices' Hurdle) and At Fishers Cross (Spa Novices' Hurdle). Lord Windermere's name is a reference to the Oscar Wilde play Lady Windermere's Fan. His dam, Satellite Dancer, showed no signs of racing ability when being well beaten in all three of her races in 1999. As a descendant of the broodmare Nantua, she was distantly related to the Prix de l'Arc de Triomphe winner Nikellora.

As a colt foal, Lord Windermere was sent to the Tattersalls Ireland in November 2006 and was bought for €30,000 by the County Kildare-based Kennycourt Stud. As a three-year-old gelding, Lord Windermere was offered for sale at Tattersalls Ireland in June and at Doncaster in August, but failed to find a buyer. In December 2010, the gelding was offered for sale for the fourth time when he was sent to the Cheltenham Breeze-Up sale and was bought for £75,000 by the trainer and former jockey Jim Culloty. The horse entered the ownership of Ronan Lambe and was sent into training with Culloty at Mallow, County Cork.

== Racing career ==
=== 2011/2012 National Hunt season: Novice hurdles ===
Lord Windermere began his racing career in novice hurdle races and was ridden in all of his races in the 2011/2012 National Hunt season by Tom Doyle. When Doyle rode the horse for the first time he told Culloty "this is the one you've been waiting for". He made an inauspicious debut, falling at the fourth hurdle when starting a 28/1 outsider at Cork. He was little better fancied when he reappeared at Thurles Racecourse on 17 November, but recorded his first success, beating Golanbrook by six lengths at odds of 25/1. He was moved up in class in December for a Listed race at Punchestown and prevailed by a head from the favourite Dylan Ross. In the Grade I Deloitte Novice Hurdle at Leopardstown in February he started at odds of 10/1 and finished fourth behind Benefficient. Lord Windermere returned to winning form at Naas in March, beating the four-year-old Ballynacree by three lengths over two miles. On his last appearance of the season, the gelding made little impact in a Grade II event over two and a half miles at Fairyhouse in April, finishing eighth behind the Jessica Harrington-trained Jenari.

=== 2012/2013 National Hunt season: Novice chases ===
Tom Doyle kept the ride in the following season, when Lord Windermere was campaigned in novice steeplechases. He made his debut over the larger obstacles on 11 November when he finished second to Dylan Ross at Navan Racecourse. He then finished second to Mikael d'Haguenet at Punchestown on 9 December and then won his first chase three weeks later at Leopardstown, beating the Willie Mullins-trained Marasonnien by two lengths. When moved up in class he finished second to Texas Jack in a Grade II event at Leopardstown on 26 January and third behind Boston Bob in the Grade I Dr P. J. Moriarty Novice Chase at the same course two weeks later.

At the Cheltenham Festival on 13 March, Lord Windermere started at odds of 8/1 for the Grade I RSA Chase over three miles in which he was ridden for the first time by Davy Russell. He was restrained at the rear of the field before beginning to make progress four fences from the finish. He made a jumping error at the next obstacle before moving up to second when Boston Bob fell at the second last. He took the lead 150 yards from the finish and won by one and three quarter lengths from Lyreen Legend. After the race, Culloty said "we knew this horse would like Cheltenham and it's all paid off. I fancied him like mad – I thought he'd love the ground here

=== 2013/2014 National Hunt season ===
Lord Windermere began his third season in the Hennessy Gold Cup at Newbury Racecourse in England in which he was assigned a weight of 162 pounds. Ridden by Dougie Costello, he was never able to reach the leaders and finished eighth of the sixteen finishers behind the Nicky Henderson-trained Triolo d'Alene. Costello again took the ride when Lord Windermere finished seventh behind Bobs Worth in the Lexus Chase at Leopardstown in December. Russell reclaimed the ride when the gelding started at odds of 6/1 for the Irish Hennessy Gold Cup on 9 February. Lord Windermere briefly disputed second place before finishing sixth behind Last Instalment.

On 14 March, Lord Windermere started a 20/1 outsider for the 2014 Cheltenham Gold Cup in a field which included Bobs Worth, Triolo d'Alene and Last Instalment. The race was run later than scheduled after several jockeys (including Ruby Walsh and Daryl Jacob) were injured in earlier races and was further delayed by two false starts. After racing in last place for most of the way, Lord Windermere began to make progress after the fourth last, but was still in eighth place turning into the straight. He jumped the last in fourth behind Silviniaco Conti, Bobs Worth and On His Own. On the run-in Silviniaco Conti and Bobs Worth, racing on the inside, were unable to make further progress and the race for first place turned into a struggle between Lord Windermere, On His Own and The Giant Bolster all of whom drifted to the right side of the course. In a finish described as "dramatic" and "controversial", Lord Windermere prevailed by a short head from On His Own, with The Giant Bolster three quarters of a length back in third. The racecourse stewards held an inquiry into possible interference between the first three finishers, but allowed the result to stand. Jim Culloty, who had won the race three times as a jockey on Best Mate said "Halfway round I was going to sack the jockey! He's not moved a muscle and he's come from nowhere. It's a dream – I'll wake up in a minute". Russell, who had earlier won the Triumph Hurdle on Tiger Roll said "I can't believe it, I was never on the bridle. I was never in the race, the whole field was in front of me for the whole race, I had to sit and suffer the whole way. I didn't use any petrol, I went around the inside and he jumped great. The whole way round I was hunting, I thought the race had gone. I was on the best horse in the race. He was very idle, like he was last year". He also admitted "I honestly thought on the first circuit that I could be pulling him up and keeping him OK for Punchestown. We managed to keep him going though and, all of a sudden, I knew I had a lot of horse under me. I thought I had a squeak jumping the first fence on the second circuit and then, at the top of the hill, I knew we were in with a chance. He's jumped super. If you leave him alone, he has more confidence, so I didn’t want to do anything for show. He's a confidence horse, so I didn’t want to pick my stick up". David Casey, who took the ride on On My Own after Ruby Walsh's injury, said that "with a straight run, I would have won the race".

=== 2014/2015 National Hunt season ===
Lord Windermere in retirement, 2026

On his first appearance of the new season, Lord Windermere was brought back in distance for the John Durkan Memorial Punchestown Chase over two and a half miles on 7 December. He was held up as usual before finishing well to take third behind Don Cossack and Boston Bob. He started 5/1 third favourite for the Lexus Chase three weeks later, but finished seventh behind Road To Riches . In the Hennessy Gold Cup in February, he took the lead approaching the second last but was overtaken at the final obstacle and finished third behind Carlingford Lough and Foxrock. In March Lord Windermere returned to Cheltenham to defend the Gold Cup and started a 20/1 outsider. As in 2014, he dropped to last on the first circuit but on this occasion he failed to make any late progress and was pulled up by Russell at the second last. The horse's owner was unhappy with Davy Russell's performance and insisted that he should not ride Lord Windermere again. Robbie McNamara was booked to ride the horse in the Grand National but after being injured in a fall at Wexford Racecourse he was replaced by Brian O'Connell. Lord Windermere was pulled up before the second Valentine's Brook in the subsequent Grand National. His final race was a handicap chase at Punchestown, where he finished tenth of nineteen runners.

In retirement, Lord Windermere became a living legend at The National Stud in Newmarket, where he shares a paddock with former sprinter The Tin Man.

== Pedigree ==
Pedigree of Lord Windermere (IRE), bay gelding, 2006
Sire Oscar (IRE) 1994	Sadler's Wells (USA); 1981	Northern Dancer	Nearctic
Sire Oscar (IRE) 1994	Sadler's Wells (USA); 1981	Northern Dancer	Natalma
Sire Oscar (IRE) 1994	Sadler's Wells (USA); 1981	Fairy Bridge	Bold Reason
Sire Oscar (IRE) 1994	Sadler's Wells (USA); 1981	Fairy Bridge	Special
Sire Oscar (IRE) 1994	Snow Day (FR); 1978	Reliance	Tantieme
Sire Oscar (IRE) 1994	Snow Day (FR); 1978	Reliance	Relance
Sire Oscar (IRE) 1994	Snow Day (FR); 1978	Vindaria	Roi Dagobert
Sire Oscar (IRE) 1994	Snow Day (FR); 1978	Vindaria	Heavenly Body
Dam Satellite Dancer (IRE) 1993	Satco (FR); 1983	Blakeney	Hethersett
Dam Satellite Dancer (IRE) 1993	Satco (FR); 1983	Blakeney	Windmill Girl
Dam Satellite Dancer (IRE) 1993	Satco (FR); 1983	Satwa	Nonoalco
Dam Satellite Dancer (IRE) 1993	Satco (FR); 1983	Satwa	Sinaia
Dam Satellite Dancer (IRE) 1993	Greek Empress (IRE); 1976	Royal Buck	Buckhound
Dam Satellite Dancer (IRE) 1993	Greek Empress (IRE); 1976	Royal Buck	Royal Charge
Dam Satellite Dancer (IRE) 1993	Greek Empress (IRE); 1976	Greek Light	Greek Star
Dam Satellite Dancer (IRE) 1993	Greek Empress (IRE); 1976	Greek Light	Only Light (Family:4-h)
