= Classic Novices' Hurdle =

Hurdle horse race in Britain

Classic Novices' Hurdle
2026
Kripticjim	Taurus Bay	Fortune Timmy

Previous years
2025
Sixmilebridge	Potters Charm	Bill Joyce
2024
Gidleigh Park	Lucky Place	Isaac Des Obeaux
2023
Rock My Way	Pembroke	Mofasa
2022
North Lodge	Balco Coastal	A Different Kind

2020-2011
2020
Harry Senior	King Roland	Protektorat
2019
Birchdale	Buster Valentine	Jarveys Plate
2018
Santini	Black Op	Aye Aye Charlie
2017
Wholestone	William Henry	Poetic Rhythm
2016
Yanworth	Shantou Village	Champers on Ice
2015
Ordo Ab Chao	Value at Risk	Vago Collonges
2014
Red Sherlock	Rathvinden	Aubusson
2013
At Fishers Cross	The New One	Coneygree
2012
Batonnier	Broadbackbob	Secret Edge
2011
Bobs Worth	Rock on Ruby	Habbie Simpson

2010-2005
2010
Restless Harry	General Miller	Royal Charm
2009
Diamond Harry	Bensalem	Ernst Blofeld
2008
Aigle D'or	Hold Em	What A Friend
2007
Wichita Lineman	Tidal Bay	Massini's Maguire
2005
Ambobo	Brewster	Mephisto

The Classic Novices' Hurdle is a Grade 2 National Hunt hurdle race in Great Britain which is open to horses aged four years or older. It is run on the New Course at Cheltenham over a distance of about 2 miles and 4½ furlongs (2 miles 4 furlongs and 56 yards, or 4,074 metres), and during its running there are ten hurdles to be jumped. The race is for novice hurdlers, and it is scheduled to take place each year in January. It was first run in 2005. It is currently sponsored by Associated Independent Stores and run as the AIS Novices' Hurdle.

== Records ==
Leading jockey (4 wins):

- Barry Geraghty – Ambobo (2005), Bobs Worth (2011), Yanworth (2016), Birchdale (2019)

Leading trainer (4 wins):

- Nicky Henderson – Aigle d'Or (2008), Bobs Worth (2011), Santini (2018), Birchdale (2019)
- Alan King - Batonnier (2012), Ordo Ab Chao (2015), Yanworth (2016), North Lodge (2022)

== Winners ==
Year	Winner	Age	Jockey	Trainer
2005	Ambobo	5	Barry Geraghty	Arnaud Chaillé-Chaillé
2006	Abandoned due to frost
2007	Wichita Lineman	6	Tony McCoy	Jonjo O'Neill
2008	Aigle d'Or	5	Marcus Foley	Nicky Henderson
2009	Diamond Harry	6	Timmy Murphy	Nick Williams
2010	Restless Harry	6	Henry Oliver	Robin Dickin
2011	Bobs Worth	6	Barry Geraghty	Nicky Henderson
2012	Batonnier	6	Wayne Hutchinson	Alan King
2013	At Fishers Cross	6	Tony McCoy	Rebecca Curtis
2014	Red Sherlock	5	Tom Scudamore	David Pipe
2015	Ordo Ab Chao	6	Wayne Hutchinson	Alan King
2016	Yanworth	6	Barry Geraghty	Alan King
2017	Wholestone	6	Daryl Jacob	Nigel Twiston-Davies
2018	Santini	6	Jeremiah McGrath	Nicky Henderson
2019	Birchdale	5	Barry Geraghty	Nicky Henderson
2020	Harry Senior	6	Robbie Power	Colin Tizzard
2021	Abandoned due to waterlogging
2022	North Lodge	5	Adrian Heskin	Alan King
2023	Rock My Way	5	Tom Scudamore	Syd Hosie
2024	Gidleigh Park	6	Jonathan Burke	Harry Fry
2025	Potters Charm (Note: Sixmilebridge finished first in 2025 but was disqualified for a banned substance in a sample)	6	Sam Twiston-Davies	Nigel Twiston-Davies
2026	Kripticjim	6	Brendan Powell	Joe Tizzard

== See also ==
- Horse racing in Great Britain
- List of British National Hunt races
