= Leading jump racing sire in Great Britain & Ireland =

The list below shows the leading jump sire of racehorses in Great Britain and Ireland for each jump season since 1988–89. This is determined by the amount of prize money won by the sire's progeny during the season.

- 1975–76 – Menelek
- 1976–77 – Master Owen
- 1977–78 – Master Owen
- 1978–79 – Spartan General
- 1979–80 – Deep Run
- 1980–81 – Deep Run
- 1981–82 – Deep Run
- 1982–83 – Deep Run
- 1983–84 – Deep Run
- 1984–85 – Deep Run
- 1985–86 – Deep Run
- 1986–87 – Deep Run
- 1987–88 – Deep Run
- 1988–89 – Deep Run
- 1989–90 – Deep Run
- 1990–91 – Deep Run
- 1991–92 – Deep Run
- 1992–93 – Deep Run
- 1993–94 – Strong Gale
- 1994–95 – Strong Gale
- 1995–96 – Strong Gale
- 1996–97 – Strong Gale
- 1997–98 – Strong Gale
- 1998–99 – Strong Gale
- 1999–00 – Be My Native
- 2000–01 – Be My Native
- 2001–02 – Be My Native
- 2002–03 – Be My Native
- 2003–04 – Be My Native
- 2004–05 – Supreme Leader
- 2005–06 – Supreme Leader
- 2006–07 – Presenting
- 2007–08 – Old Vic
- 2008–09 – Presenting
- 2009–10 – Presenting
- 2010–11 – Presenting
- 2011–12 – King's Theatre
- 2012–13 – Beneficial
- 2013–14 – King's Theatre
- 2014–15 – King's Theatre
- 2015–16 – King's Theatre
- 2016–17 – King's Theatre
- 2017–18 – Flemensfirth
- 2018–19 – Flemensfirth
- 2019–20 – Milan
- 2020–21 – Stowaway
- 2021–22 – Yeats
- 2022–23 – Yeats
- 2023–24 – Walk in the Park

== See also ==
- Leading sire in Great Britain & Ireland
- Leading broodmare sire in Great Britain & Ireland
