= Erhaab =

American-bred Thoroughbred racehorse

- Racing colours of Hamdan Al Maktoum
- Sire: Chief's Crown
- Grandsire: Danzig
- Dam: Histoire
- Damsire: Riverman
- Sex: Stallion
- Foaled: 24 May 1991
- Country: United States
- Colour: Brown
- Breeder: Shadwell Farm Inc & Shadwell Estates Co Ltd
- Owner: Hamdan Al Maktoum
- Trainer: John Dunlop
- Record: 11: 4-3-2
- Earnings: £596,662

Major wins
- Dante Stakes (1994); Epsom Derby (1994)
- Last updated on August 25, 2007

Erhaab (24 May 1991 – 22 November 2021) was a Thoroughbred race horse and sire, bred in the United States but trained in the United Kingdom. He is best known as the winner of the 1994 Epsom Derby. In 2011 he was moved from the Wood Farm Stud in Shropshire to the Batsford Stud in Gloucestershire . He was retired from covering duties since 2013, and died in 2021.

== Background ==
Erhaab was a smaller than average Thoroughbred horse, standing 15.2 hands high with a dark brown coat which has sometimes, incorrectly, been described as black. He was bred in the United States by his owner Hamdan Al Maktoum's, Shadwell Stud breeding organisation.

He was sired by Chief's Crown out of the Riverman mare Histoire. Chief's Crown won the 1984 Breeders' Cup Juvenile and was voted the Eclipse Award for Outstanding Two-Year-Old Male Horse. He sired several other important horses including Chief Bearheart and Grand Lodge. Apart from Erhaab, Histoire's best runner was the filly Oumaldaaya, winner of the Premio Lydia Tesio.

He was trained throughout his career by John Dunlop at Arundel, West Sussex, and was ridden in all but one of his races by Willie Carson.

"Erhaab" (إرهاب) is an Arabic word which can be translated as "terrifying" or "intimidating" and was reportedly given to the colt because of his unusually dark colour.

== Racing career ==
=== 1993: two-year-old season ===
Erhaab had an active season as a juvenile, running six times and winning twice. He made his first appearance in a maiden race at Newmarket in July, finishing seventh of the seventeen runners. The race would prove to have been a highly competitive one: apart from Erhaab, the field included the future Group One winners King's Theatre, Overbury (Queen Elizabeth II Cup) and Nicolotte (Premio Vittorio di Capua). Two weeks later, Erhaab ran disappointingly, finishing twelfth in a similar race at Newbury. Again, the race produced some very good horses, this time including Piccolo (Nunthorpe Stakes), Hawajiss (Nassau Stakes) and Make A Stand (Champion Hurdle).

In August, at Newcastle Erhaab won his first race, quickening well to take the lead inside the final furlong and running on strongly to win by two and a half lengths. At Leicester he showed further improvement, taking the lead two furlongs out and pulling away to win a minor stakes race by seven lengths.

Erhaab started odds-on favourite for his next start, a three-runner race at Salisbury. He took the lead, but was soon challenged and headed by Tatami. The two colts ran together through the final furlong, and although he "rallied" well, Erhaab was beaten by a short head. On his final start of the year, Erhaab was stepped up to Group Three class for the Horris Hill Stakes at Newbury. He took the lead in the straight but was headed by Tatami again, and finished third, beaten two and a half lengths.

=== 1994: three-year-old season ===
==== Spring ====
As a two-year-old, Erhaab had been raced exclusively over seven furlongs, and had shown ability, but appeared to be below top class. At three, he was sent over middle distances and showed immediate improvement. On his debut he ran in the Listed Feilden Stakes at Newmarket, in which he was matched against Weigh Anchor, a colt who was regarded as a serious Derby prospect. Erhaab raced prominently, but Carson was unable to find space for a run on the rails and had to pull the colt to the outside in the closing stages. Erhaab quickened well, proving too good for Weigh Anchor, but failed by a neck to catch the leader Cicerao.

Erhaab then produced his best performance in his most important race to date. He was sent to York for the Dante Stakes an important Derby trial, where he was faced by a field that included the 2,000 Guineas winner, Mister Baileys as well as King's Theatre and Weigh Anchor. Carson made his challenge on Erhaab two furlongs out, and the colt quickened well to take the lead and then pulled clear to win in "impressive" style by three and a half lengths. After the race Carson was full of confidence, praising the colts stamina and speed, and saying that he had "all the credentials to be a Derby winner."

Erhaab was now considered a leading contender for the Derby and was offered at odds as short as 9/4 by the bookmakers. The colt was believed to be particularly suited by fast ground, and a period of wet weather in late May saw his odds lengthen. Dry conditions in the week before the race however, led to his odds shortening again and he regained his position as favourite.

==== Summer ====
At Epsom, Erhaab was made favourite at 7/2 in a field of twenty-five. Jason Weaver sent Mister Baileys to the lead and opened up a gap of several lengths as Erhaab was held up towards the rear. The number of runners led to considerable congestion and bumping, with Willie Ryan being unseated from Foyer in the worst of many incidents- Carson described it as "carnage..there were murders going on". Mister Baileys maintained a six-length lead into the straight but began to struggle two furlongs out, as Carson negotiated his way through a series of gaps on the inside to move into contention with Erhaab. A furlong out King's Theatre moved past Mister Baileys and into the lead. Erhaab was switched to the outside by Carson and produced a strong, sustained run, ("like a dart from a blowpipe") catching King's Theatre inside the last furlong and moving ahead to win by one and a quarter lengths. At 51 years old, Willie Carson was the third oldest jockey to win the Derby.

Erhaab's next race was the Eclipse Stakes at Sandown in which he faced older horses for the first time. His Derby win was sufficiently impressive for him to be sent off the odds on favourite, but after having every chance in the straight, he failed to quicken and finished third behind the five-year-old Ezzoud and the four-year-old Bob's Return. Although Dunlop described the result as merely "disappointing" and pointed out that Erhaab, as a very late foal, was still relatively immature, some commentators saw the result as proof that the standard of the three-year-old colts was unusually poor.

On his final start, Erhaab was moved back up to a mile and a half for the King George VI and Queen Elizabeth Stakes at Ascot for which he was again made favourite. Erhaab was held up and appeared to be moving into contention in the straight when he has badly hampered by the riderless Ezzoud, who had unseated his jockey at the start. He was unable to recover, and faded in the closing stages to finish seventh of the eleven surviving runners behind King's Theatre.

After two disappointing runs (Dunlop had said that the colt was "very sore" after the Eclipse) Erhaab was given a thorough veterinary examination. Initial x-rays revealed no problems but ultrasound scans revealed that he had sustained serious damage to his suspensory ligaments. The prognosis was that he was unlikely to make a full recovery, even with long rest. The decision to retire Erhaab from racing was announced on 11 August. Carson expressed both his disappointment and his belief that Erhaab would have been a strong contender for the Prix de l'Arc de Triomphe.

In October it was announced that Erhaab had been sold for $5,500,000 to stand at stud in Japan.

== Race record ==
Date	Race	Dist (f)	Course	Class	Prize (£K)	Odds	Runners	Placing	Margin	Time	Jockey	Trainer
30 July 1993	EBF Dexa'tex Maiden Stakes	7	Newmarket July	M	5	14/1	17	7	9	1:26.44	Willie Carson	John Dunlop
14 August 1993	Yattendon Maiden Stakes	7	Newbury	M	5	12/1	23	12	12	1:25.80	Willie Carson	John Dunlop
30 August 1993	EBF Hedgehope Maiden Stakes	7	Newcastle	M	4	11/2	7	1	2	1:25.29	Billy Newnes	John Dunlop
13 September 1993	Kegworth Conditions Stakes	7	Leicester		3	6/5	5	1	7	1:29.50	Willie Carson	John Dunlop
29 September 1993	Westbury Motor Auctions Sia Trophy Stakes	7	Salisbury		5	8/13	3	2	Short head	1:28.64	Willie Carson	John Dunlop
21 October 1993	Horris Hill Stakes	7	Newbury	3	25	4/1	8	3	2.5	1:35.63	Willie Carson	John Dunlop
14 April 1994	Feilden Stakes	9	Newmarket Rowley	L	10	4/1	8	2	Neck	1:59.83	Willie Carson	John Dunlop
11 May 1994	Dante Stakes	10.5	York	2	73	11/2	9	1	3.5	2.06.18	Willie Carson	John Dunlop
1 June 1994	Derby	12	Epsom	1	473	7/2	25	1	1.25	2:34.16	Willie Carson	John Dunlop
2 July 1994	Eclipse Stakes	10	Sandown	1	177	4/6	8	3	2.25	2.04.70	Willie Carson	John Dunlop
23 July 1994	King George VI and Queen Elizabeth Stakes	12	Ascot	1	265	7/2	12	7	11	2.28.92	Willie Carson	John Dunlop

== Assessment ==
In the International Classification, released in January 1995, Erhaab was assigned a figure of 126. This placed him equal fourth amongst the European three-year-olds, behind the filly Balanchine, the miler Distant View and the Breeders' Cup Turf winner Tikkanen.

Erhaab was given a Timeform rating of 127 for his Derby win, making him an average winner of the race. In their book A Century of Champions, John Randall and Tony Morris rated Erhaab as an "inferior" Derby winner.

== Stud career ==
Erhaab began his stud career in Japan where he stood from 1995 until 1999. In 1999 Hamdan Al Maktoum bought Erhaab back from the Japanese syndicate to be a part of his Shadwell Stud group. Erhaab spent the 2000 season at Shadwell's American base at Lexington, Kentucky, before being returned to England to stand at the Beech House Stud at Newmarket, Suffolk. In 2005, Erhaab was moved from Newmarket to the Wood Farm Stud near Wellington, Shropshire, where his stud fee was announced as £2,000. In October 2011 it was announced that Erhaab would move to the Batsford Stud in Gloucestershire for the 2012 season.

Erhaab was a success at stud, siring no Group race winners from fourteen crops of foals. His best product was probably Sohraab, a successful sprint handicapper.

Erhaab died in his sleep at Batsford on 22 November 2021, aged 30. The stud announced "We are sorry to say we lost our lovely old boy Erhaab who died peacefully in his sleep last night at the grand old age of 30. He was such a character and had quite a following. People often enquired after his wellbeing. He will be sorely missed by us all at Batsford Stud."

== Pedigree ==
Pedigree of Erhaab (USA), brown stallion, 1991
Sire Chief's Crown (USA) 1982	Danzig (USA); 1977	Northern Dancer	Nearctic
Sire Chief's Crown (USA) 1982	Danzig (USA); 1977	Northern Dancer	Natalma
Sire Chief's Crown (USA) 1982	Danzig (USA); 1977	Pas De Nom	Admiral's Voyage
Sire Chief's Crown (USA) 1982	Danzig (USA); 1977	Pas De Nom	Petitioner
Sire Chief's Crown (USA) 1982	Six Crowns (USA); 1976	Secretariat	Bold Ruler
Sire Chief's Crown (USA) 1982	Six Crowns (USA); 1976	Secretariat	Somethingroyal
Sire Chief's Crown (USA) 1982	Six Crowns (USA); 1976	Chris Evert	Swoon's Son
Sire Chief's Crown (USA) 1982	Six Crowns (USA); 1976	Chris Evert	Miss Carmie
Dam Histoire (FRA) 1979	Riverman (USA); 1969	Never Bend	Nasrullah
Dam Histoire (FRA) 1979	Riverman (USA); 1969	Never Bend	Lalun
Dam Histoire (FRA) 1979	Riverman (USA); 1969	River Lady	Prince John
Dam Histoire (FRA) 1979	Riverman (USA); 1969	River Lady	Nile Lily
Dam Histoire (FRA) 1979	Helvetie (GB); 1965	Klairon	Clarion
Dam Histoire (FRA) 1979	Helvetie (GB); 1965	Klairon	Kalmia
Dam Histoire (FRA) 1979	Helvetie (GB); 1965	Heiress	Rockefella
Dam Histoire (FRA) 1979	Helvetie (GB); 1965	Heiress	Martial Air (family 1-w)
