= Feilden Stakes =

Flat horse race in Britain

- Class: Listed
- Location: Rowley Mile; Newmarket, England
- Inaugurated: 1978
- Race type: Flat / Thoroughbred
- Sponsor: Bet365
- Website: Newmarket

Race information
- Distance: 1m 1f (1,811 metres)
- Surface: Turf
- Track: Straight
- Qualification: Three-year-olds
- Weight: 9 st 2 lb Allowances; 5 lb for fillies Penalties; 5 lb for Group race winners* 3 lb for Listed winners* *after 31 August 2024
- Purse: £55,000 (2025); 1st: £31,191

Feilden Stakes
2026
Morshdi	Poseidon's Warrior	Bourbon Blues

Previous years
2025
Almeric	King Of Cities	Nightwalker
2024
Jayarebe	Whip Cracker	Caviar Heights
2023
Canberra Legend	Kolsai	Killybegs Warrior
2022
Eydon	Masekela	Austrian Theory
2021
Highland Avenue	Secret Protector	Royal Champion

2020-2011
2019
Kick On	Walkinthesand	Boerhan
2018
Mildenberger	Fortune's Pearl	Kew Gardens
2017
Khalidi	Salouen	Law And Order
2016
Ventura Storm	Mustajeer	Tathqeef
2015
Golden Horn	Peacock	Disegno
2014
True Story	Obliterator	Truth Or Dare
2013
Intello	King George River	Glory Awaits
2012
Stipulate	Mister Music	Producer
2011
Dordogne	Happy Today	Moriarty

2010-2001
2010
Rumoush	Fighter Boy	Marie De Medici
2009
Redwood	Drumbeat	Heliodor
2008
Campanologist	Kandahar Run	Poet
2007
Petara Bay	Salford Mill	Fishforcompliments
2006
Atlantic Waves	Olympian Odyssey	Silver Blue
2005
Rocamadour	Kings Quay	Daring Ransom
2004
Gold History	Psychiatrist	Temple Place
2003
Magistretti	Dunhill Star	Excelsius
2002
Playapart	Wahchi	Bollin Eric
2001
Olden Times	Sunny Glenn	Elnahaar

2000-1991
2000
Pawn Broker	Island Sound	Three Points
1999
Golden Snake	Gold Academy	Housemaster
1998
Border Arrow	Alboostan	Dark Moondancer
1997
Fahris	Panama City	Crimson Tide
1996
Storm Trooper	St Mawes	Jack Jennings
1995
Munwar	Flemensfirth	Eltish
1994
Cicerao	Erhaab	Weigh Anchor
1993
Placerville	Desert Team	Yeltsin
1992
Twist And Turn	Young Senor	Thyer
1991
Half A Tick	Regal Sabre	Desert Splendour

1990-1988
1990
Lord Of The Field	Duke Of Paducah	Golan Heights
1989
Greenwich Papillon	Opening Verse	Weldnaas
1988
Kefaah	Undercut	Carroll House

The Feilden Stakes is a Listed flat horse race in Great Britain open to three-year-old horses. It is run over a distance of 1 mile and 1 furlong (1,811 metres) on the Rowley Mile at Newmarket in mid-April.

== History ==
The event was established in 1978, and it was originally called the Heath Stakes. The first running was won by Hawaiian Sound.

The race was renamed the Gerry Feilden Memorial Stakes in 1982. It was named in memory of Major General Sir Randle Feilden (1904–81), a former senior steward of the Jockey Club. Its title was shortened to the Feilden Stakes in 1987.

The event can serve as a trial for various Classic races. The runner-up in 1994, Erhaab, subsequently won The Derby, as did the 2015 winner, Golden Horn. The 2013 winner, Intello, went on to win the Prix du Jockey Club.

The Feilden Stakes is currently held on the first day of Newmarket's three-day Craven Meeting. It is run the day before the Craven Stakes.

== Records ==
Leading jockey (4 wins):

- Greville Starkey – Ela-Mana-Mou (1979), Running Mill (1980), Kalaglow (1981), Zoffany (1983)
- Pat Eddery – Flying Trio (1986), Placerville (1993), Storm Trooper (1996), Olden Times (2001)
- Frankie Dettori - Border Arrow (1998), Dordogne (2011), Golden Horn (2015), Khalidi (2017)

Leading trainer (8 wins):

- Sir Henry Cecil – Ivano (1982), Trojan Fen (1984), Legal Bid (1987), Twist and Turn (1992), Placerville (1993), Cicerao (1994), Storm Trooper (1996), Stipulate (2012)

== Winners ==
Year	Winner	Jockey	Trainer	Time
1978	Hawaiian Sound	Ernie Johnson	Barry Hills	1:55.05
1979	Ela-Mana-Mou	Greville Starkey	Guy Harwood	1:52.32
1980	Running Mill	Greville Starkey	Michael Stoute	1:54.26
1981	Kalaglow	Greville Starkey	Guy Harwood	1:54.48
1982	Ivano	Lester Piggott	Henry Cecil	1:53.38
1983	Zoffany	Greville Starkey	Guy Harwood	1:59.47
1984	Trojan Fen	Lester Piggott	Henry Cecil	1:52.86
1985	Les Arcs	Walter Swinburn	Michael Stoute	1:56.42
1986	Flying Trio	Pat Eddery	Luca Cumani	2:02.18
1987	Legal Bid	Steve Cauthen	Henry Cecil	1:54.09
1988	Kefaah	Ray Cochrane	Luca Cumani	1:54.72
1989	Greenwich Papillon	John Reid	Wally Carter	2:01.05
1990	Lord of the Field	George Duffield	James Toller	1:52.13
1991	Half a Tick	Richard Quinn	Paul Cole	1:49.74
1992	Twist and Turn	Steve Cauthen	Henry Cecil	1:51.95
1993	Placerville	Pat Eddery	Henry Cecil	1:51.11
1994	Cicerao	Walter Swinburn	Henry Cecil	1:59.83
1995	Munwar	Willie Carson	Peter Walwyn	1:48.53
1996	Storm Trooper	Pat Eddery	Henry Cecil	1:49.48
1997	Fahris	Richard Hills	Ben Hanbury	1:50.57
1998	Border Arrow	Frankie Dettori	Ian Balding	1:58.92
1999 (Note: The 1999 edition was run on Newmarket's July Course over 1 mile and 110 yards)	Golden Snake	Michael Hills	Barry Hills	1:44.10
2000	Pawn Broker	Michael Kinane	David Elsworth	1:55.14
2001	Olden Times	Pat Eddery	John Dunlop	1:55.29
2002	Playapart	Eddie Ahern	Gerard Butler	1:49.40
2003	Magistretti	Kieren Fallon	Neville Callaghan	1:53.59
2004	Gold History	Joe Fanning	Mark Johnston	1:53.89
2005	Rocamadour	Ted Durcan	Mick Channon	1:51.81
2006	Atlantic Waves	Joe Fanning	Mark Johnston	1:53.35
2007	Petara Bay	Dane O'Neill	Terry Mills	1:49.76
2008	Campanologist	Joe Fanning	Mark Johnston	1:54.15
2009	Redwood	Michael Hills	Barry Hills	1:52.73
2010	Rumoush	Richard Hills	Marcus Tregoning	1:51.98
2011	Dordogne	Frankie Dettori	Mark Johnston	1:52.16
2012	Stipulate	Tom Queally	Sir Henry Cecil	1:56.62
2013	Intello	Olivier Peslier	André Fabre	1:51.55
2014	True Story	Silvestre de Sousa	Saeed bin Suroor	1:51.60
2015	Golden Horn	Frankie Dettori	John Gosden	1:48.16
2016	Ventura Storm	Ryan Moore	Richard Hannon Jr.	1:56.91
2017	Khalidi	Frankie Dettori	John Gosden	1:50.43
2018	Mildenberger	James Doyle	Mark Johnston	1:53.67
2019	Kick On	Oisin Murphy	John Gosden	1:51.16
	no race 2020 (Note: The 2020 running was cancelled because of the COVID-19 pandemic in the United Kingdom)
2021	Highland Avenue	James Doyle	Charlie Appleby	1:48.23
2022	Eydon	David Egan	Roger Varian	1:50.89
2023	Canberra Legend	Daniel Muscutt	James Ferguson	1:56.24
2024	Jayarebe	Sean Levey	Brian Meehan	1:47.41
2025	Almeric	Oisin Murphy	Andrew Balding	1:53.23
2026	Morshdi	Tom Marquand	William Haggas	1:50.79

== See also ==
- Horse racing in Great Britain
- List of British flat horse races
