= Bobs Worth =

Irish-bred Thoroughbred racehorse

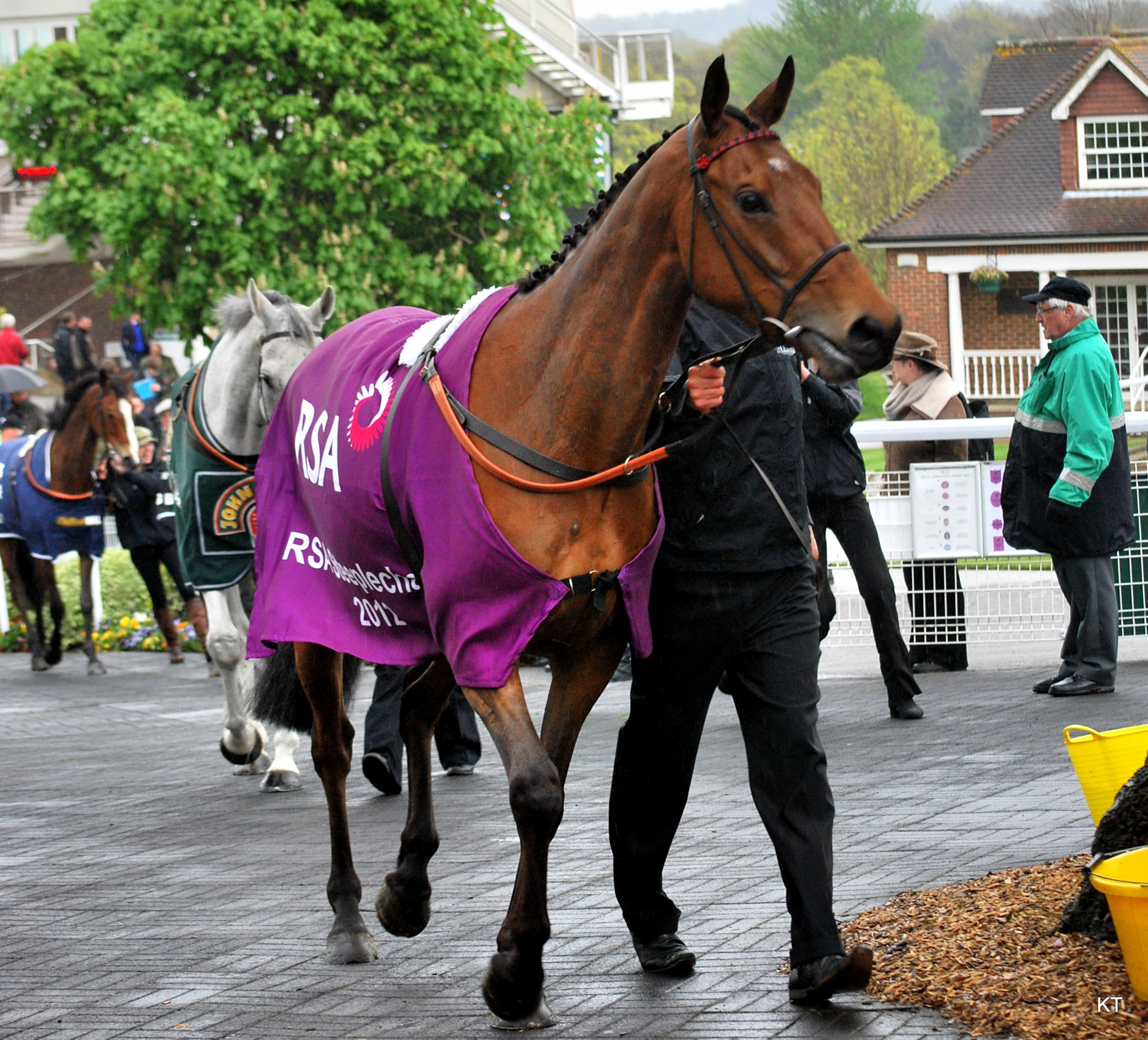
- Bobs Worth at Sandown, in 2012
- Sire: Bob Back
- Grandsire: Roberto
- Dam: Fashionista
- Damsire: King's Theatre
- Sex: Gelding
- Foaled: 21 May 2005
- Died: 20 January 2022 (aged 16) (Note: By horse racing convention, Bobs Worth is regarded as being a 17 year old at the time of his death, as all Thoroughbreds foaled in the Northern Hemisphere are deemed to have been born on 1 January.)
- Country: Ireland
- Colour: Bay
- Breeder: Lois Eadie
- Owner: The Not Afraid Partnership
- Trainer: Nicky Henderson
- Jockey: Barry Geraghty
- Record: 20: 11–2–2; 12: 5–1–1 (Chases); 6: 5–0–1 (Hurdles); 2: 1–1-–0 (Bumpers)
- Earnings: £690,847

Major wins
- Classic Novices' Hurdle (2011); Albert Bartlett Novices' Hurdle (2011); Berkshire Novices' Chase (2011); RSA Chase (2012); Hennessy Gold Cup (2012); Cheltenham Gold Cup (2013); Lexus Chase (2013)

Bobs Worth (21 May 2005 – 20 January 2022) was an Irish-bred, British-trained Thoroughbred racehorse. He won the Albert Bartlett Novices' Hurdle in 2011, the RSA Chase in 2012 and the Cheltenham Gold Cup in 2013 at the Cheltenham Festival, making him the first horse since Flyingbolt in the 1960s to win three different races at consecutive Cheltenham Festivals. In 2012, he also won the Hennessy Gold Cup at Newbury. Bobs Worth was trained by Nicky Henderson, owned by the Not Afraid Partnership.

The name "Bobs Worth" literally meant that he was worth a shilling – a coin worth a twentieth of a pound – but he was sold to Nicky Henderson by Barry Geraghty for £20,000 and went on to earn much more.

== Background ==
Bobs Worth was a bay gelding bred by Lois Eadie in Brookeborough and foaled on 21 May 2005. His sire was top jump sire Bob Back. Bob Back's progeny include Mildmay Novices' Chase winner Burton Port and Supreme Novices' Hurdle winner Back In Front. Bob Back was a son of 1972 Epsom Derby winner Roberto. Bobs Worth's dam, Fashionista, is a daughter of King George VI and Queen Elizabeth Stakes winner King's Theatre.

== Racing career ==
=== Early career ===
Bobs Worth started his racing career in the 2009/10 National Hunt season. He ran in two national hunt flat races at Kempton Park, finishing second in one and winning the other. In November 2010 he raced for the first time over hurdles, beating Sire De Grugy by nine lengths in a two-mile novices hurdle race at Kempton Park. He followed this up, racing away from Kempton for the first time, by winning a two and a half mile hurdle race at Cheltenham. He then stepped up in class for the Grade 2 Classic Novices' Hurdle, also at Cheltenham. Ridden by Barry Geraghty, he won the race by 2 1/4 lengths from future Champion Hurdle winner Rock On Ruby, with the two 9 lengths clear of third placed Habbie Simpson. At the Cheltenham Festival he started as the 15/8 favourite for the Albert Bartlett Novices' Hurdle. In the early stages of the race he was placed in the middle of the eighteen-runner field by Geraghty. He took the lead between the last two hurdles and won by 2 1/4 lengths from Mossley. Court In Motion finished in third place, with Champion Court finishing fourth.

=== 2011/12 season ===
Bobs Worth started his steeplechase career by winning the 2011 Berkshire Novices' Chase, beating former Champion Bumper winner Cue Card by a short head, with the two well clear of the other two runners. He then finished third in the Feltham Novices' Chase, about five lengths behind winner Grands Crus and two lengths behind runner-up Silviniaco Conti. Bobs Worth finished ahead of Silviniaco Conti in his next race, the Reynoldstown Novices' Chase, but was beaten two lengths into second by Invictus. At the 2012 Cheltenham Festival he contested the RSA Chase. Grands Crus started the race as the 6/5 favourite, with the previous year's Neptune Investment Management Novices' Hurdle winner First Lieutenant and Bobs Worth next in the betting, both priced at 9/2. Bobs Worth was in the middle of the pack in the early stages and made progress through the field with eight fences still to jump, taking the lead four out. He was overtaken as they turned into the straight, but regained the lead at the final fence. He drew away near the finish to win by 2 1/2 lengths from First Lieutenant. Call The Police was a further nine lengths back in third, with Grands Crus finishing fourth.

=== 2012/13 season ===
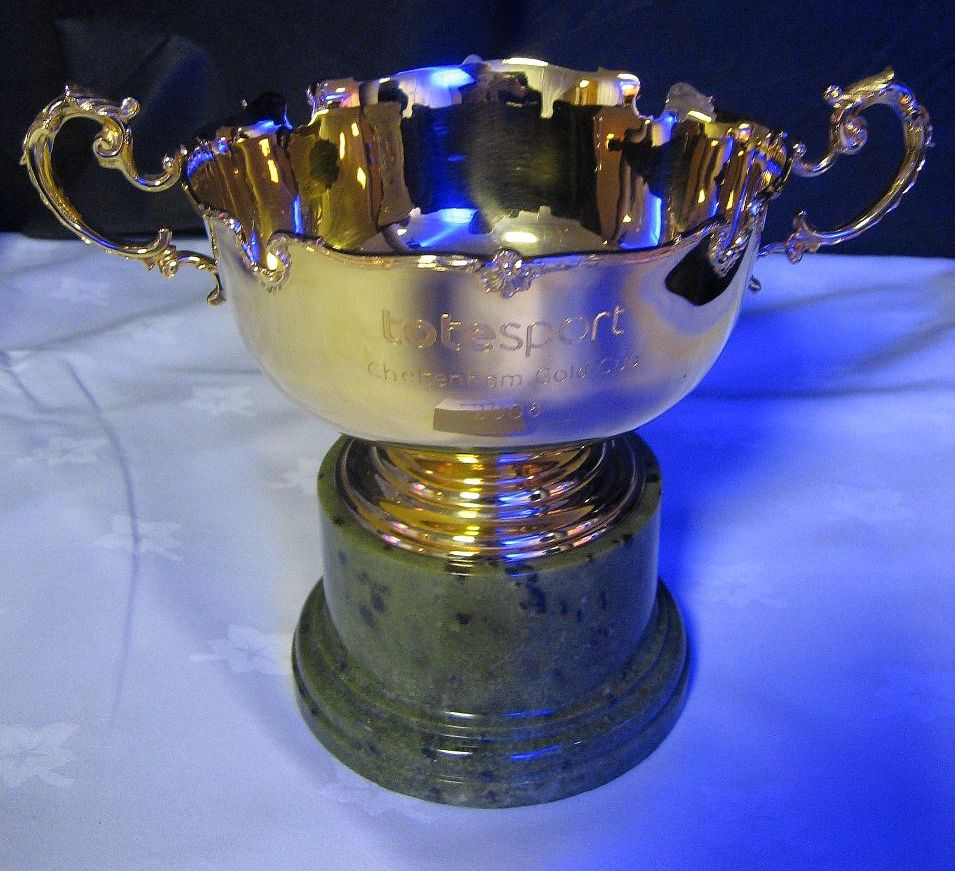
The Cheltenham Gold Cup, which Bobs Worth won in 2013

Carrying 11 stone 6 pounds, Bobs Worth started as the favourite for the Hennessy Gold Cup. He won the race by 3 1/4 lengths from Tidal Bay. After the win, he was immediately installed as the favourite for the 2013 Cheltenham Gold Cup, at about 5/1. He was scheduled to take part in the Argento Chase in January, but was withdrawn by trainer Nicky Henderson. He did however take part in a racecourse gallop with Binocular and Long Run in February.

On 15 March, Bobs Worth started the 11/4 favourite for the Cheltenham Gold Cup. He appeared unlikely to win after being hampered at the third last fence and was still eight lengths behind Long Run on the final turn. Geraghty, however, produced the horse with a strong run to take the lead approaching the final fence, and Bobs Worth drew away from the field on the run-in to win by seven lengths from Sir Des Champs. His win took his career prize money earnings to £578,135 and made him the first horse since Flyingbolt in 1964–1966 to win three different races at the Cheltenham Festival in consecutive years.

=== 2013/14 season ===
Bobs Worth made his seasonal debut in the Betfair Chase at Haydock Park Racecourse in November and started 15/8 favourite in a strong field which included Silviniaco Conti, Long Run, Tidal Bay and Cue Card. He was never travelling well and was eased down by Geraghty when his chance had gone, finishing sixth, forty lengths behind the winner Cue Card. On 28 December 2013, Bobs Worth started 11/4 joint favourite with Sir Des Champs in the Lexus Chase at Leopardstown, a race which also attracted the 2013 RSA Chase winner Lord Windermere. Racing on soft ground, Bobs Worth appeared to be struggling four fences out but stayed on strongly to take the lead in the closing stages and won by 1 1/2 lengths from First Lieutenant, with Sir Des Champs fourth and Lord Windermere seventh of the nine runners. Henderson commented "I would have given anything to take him out two days ago. With the ground and the weather, I wasn't that happy with him, but the horse never stops surprising you".

On 14 March, Bobs Worth started 6/4 favourite ahead of Silviniaco Conti to become the first horse since Best Mate to win consecutive Cheltenham Gold Cups. He was towards the rear of the field in the early stages, but made steady progress to challenge the leader Silviniaco Conti at the last fence, but the two leading contenders were overtaken by a trio of outsiders on the run-in, and Bob Worth finished fifth behind Lord Windermere, On His Own, The Giant Bolster and Silviniaco Conti.

=== 2014/15 season ===
Bobs Worth struggled to recover his form in the following year. He started favourite for the Lexus Chase in December but came home last of the eight finishers behind Road To Riches. When attempting to regain the Cheltenham Gold Cup in March, he was never in contention and was pulled up by Geraghty five fences from the finish in a race won by Coneygree. In his final start of the season he raced in the Bet365 Gold Cup and failed to give weight away, carrying 11st-8lb, finishing only second last.

=== 2015/16 season ===
Bobs Worth made a successful start of his new campaign on 7 November 2015 in the Betfred Hurdle after being sent off as the outsider of the five-runner field, he made all from the front and battled well in the last furlong to repel the challenge from his stablemate Simonsig, who was also having his first outing for 970 days. Bobs Worth finished 1 1/2 lengths in front of Simonsig, and their trainer Nicky Henderson said: "It's been a long way back for both of them from the wilderness". It was Bobs Worth's first run over hurdles since winning the Albert Bartlett Novices' Hurdle at the 2011 Cheltenham Festival and remained unbeaten over the code until coming third in the World Hurdle at the 2016 Cheltenham Festival, after which he was retired to Hillwood Stud, a Thoroughbred stud farm in Wiltshire.

== Death ==
Bobs Worth died accidentally in a field on 20 January 2022 at the age of 16.

== Pedigree ==
Pedigree of Bob's Worth (IRE), bay gelding, 2005
Sire Bob Back (USA) 1981	Roberto (USA); 1969	Hail to Reason	Turn-To
Sire Bob Back (USA) 1981	Roberto (USA); 1969	Hail to Reason	Nothirdchance
Sire Bob Back (USA) 1981	Roberto (USA); 1969	Bramalea	Nashua
Sire Bob Back (USA) 1981	Roberto (USA); 1969	Bramalea	Rarelea
Sire Bob Back (USA) 1981	Toter Back (USA); 1967	Carry Back	Saggy
Sire Bob Back (USA) 1981	Toter Back (USA); 1967	Carry Back	Joppy
Sire Bob Back (USA) 1981	Toter Back (USA); 1967	Romantic Miss	Beauchef
Sire Bob Back (USA) 1981	Toter Back (USA); 1967	Romantic Miss	Roman Zephyr
Dam Fashionista (IRE) 1999	King's Theatre (IRE); 1991	Sadler's Wells	Northern Dancer
Dam Fashionista (IRE) 1999	King's Theatre (IRE); 1991	Sadler's Wells	Fairy Bridge
Dam Fashionista (IRE) 1999	King's Theatre (IRE); 1991	Regal Beauty	Princely Native
Dam Fashionista (IRE) 1999	King's Theatre (IRE); 1991	Regal Beauty	Dennis Belle
Dam Fashionista (IRE) 1999	Last Flair (IRE); 1982	Busted	Crepello
Dam Fashionista (IRE) 1999	Last Flair (IRE); 1982	Busted	Sans le Sou
Dam Fashionista (IRE) 1999	Last Flair (IRE); 1982	Paddy's Flair	Alcide
Dam Fashionista (IRE) 1999	Last Flair (IRE); 1982	Paddy's Flair	Paddy's Sister (Family: 7)
