= 2013 Cheltenham Gold Cup =

- Cheltenham Gold Cup
- Location: Cheltenham Racecourse
- Date: 15 March 2013
- Winning horse: Bobs Worth
- Starting price: 11/4F
- Jockey: Barry Geraghty
- Trainer: Nicky Henderson
- Owner: The Not Afraid Partnership
- Conditions: Soft, Good to Soft in places.

The 2013 Cheltenham Gold Cup (known as the Betfred Gold Cup for sponsorship reasons) was the 85th annual running of the Cheltenham Gold Cup horse race held at Cheltenham Racecourse on 15 March 2013.

Nine horses ran and the steeplechase was won by 11/4 favorite Bobs Worth, who was trained by Nicky Henderson and ridden by Barry Geraghty. Bobs Worth won by a distance of 7 lengths from second-placed Sir Des Champs, with Long Run in third.

The race was shown live on Channel 4 in the UK and Ireland.

== Details ==
- Sponsor: Betfred
- Winner's prize money: £313,225.00
- Going: Soft, Good to Soft in places.
- Number of runners: 9
- Winner's time: 7 mins 5.06 secs

== Full result ==
	*	Horse	Age	Jockey	Trainer ^{†}	SP
1		Bobs Worth	8	Barry Geraghty	Nicky Henderson	11/4F
2	7	Sir Des Champs	7	Tony McCoy	Willie Mullins (Ire)	4/1
3	2 3/4	Long Run	8	Mr Sam Waley-Cohen	Nicky Henderson	7/2
4	6	The Giant Bolster	8	Tom Scudamore	David Bridgwater	16/1
5	6	Cape Tribulation	9	Denis O'Regan	Malcolm Jefferson	12/1
6	13	Captain Chris	9	Richard Johnson	Philip Hobbs	14/1
7	37	Wayward Prince	9	Jack Doyle	Hilary Parrott	100/1
Fell	Fence	Silviniaco Conti	7	Ruby Walsh	Paul Nicholls	4/1
PU	Fence	Monbeg Dude	8	Sam Twiston-Davies	Michael Scudamore, junior	40/1
NR		Bog Warrior	9		Tony Martin
NR		Sunnyhillboy	10	Tony McCoy (Note: Tony McCoy was due to ride Sunnyhillboy but Sunnyhillboy was declared non runner which allowed McCoy ride Sir Des Champs)	Jonjo O'Neill

* The distances between the horses are shown in lengths or shorter. shd = short-head.
† Trainers are based in Great Britain unless indicated. PU = pulled-up. NR = non runner

== Winners details ==
Further details of the winner, Bobs Worth.

- Sex: Gelding
- Foaled: 21 May 2005
- Country: Ireland
- Sire: Bob Back; Dam: Fashionista (Kings Theatre)
- Owner: The Not Afraid Partnership
- Breeder: Mrs L Eadie

== See also ==
- Horseracing in Great Britain
- List of British National Hunt races
- 2013 Grand National
