= King's Theatre (horse) =

Irish-bred Thoroughbred racehorse

- Racing colours of Sheikh Mohammed
- Sire: Sadler's Wells
- Grandsire: Northern Dancer
- Dam: Regal Beauty
- Damsire: Princely Native
- Sex: Stallion
- Foaled: 1991
- Country: Ireland
- Colour: Bay
- Breeder: Michael Poland
- Owner: Michael Poland (1993); Sheikh Mohammed (1994–1995); Godolphin (1996)
- Trainer: Henry Cecil (1993–1994); Bill Mott (1995); Saeed bin Suroor (1996)
- Record: 17: 5-3-3
- Earnings: £756,921

Major wins
- Racing Post Trophy (1993); Craven Stakes (1994); King George VI and Queen Elizabeth Stakes (1994)

Awards
- European Champion Three-year old colt (1994); Leading jump racing sire in Britain & Ireland (2011–12, 2013–14)
- Last updated on June 22, 2007

King's Theatre (1 May 1991 – 13 June 2011) was an Irish-bred Thoroughbred racehorse and sire. He was trained in the United Kingdom and the United States during a racing career which lasted from July 1993 to June 1996, winning five of his seventeen races. He is best known for winning the King George VI and Queen Elizabeth Stakes in 1994, a year in which he was named European Champion Three-year old colt. King's Theatre later became a sire of both flat racers and jumpers.

== Background ==
King's Theatre was bred in Ireland by Michael Poland. He was from the sixth crop of the fourteen times Champion sire Sadler's Wells out of the mare Regal Beauty, making him a half-brother to the Royal Lodge Stakes winner High Estate, who was European Champion Two-Year-Old in 1988. He was sent into training with Henry Cecil at Newmarket.

== Racing career ==
=== 1993: two-year-old season ===
King's Theatre made his first appearance in July 1993, finishing fifth in a maiden race at Newmarket. A five-length win in a Yarmouth maiden race was followed by a four-length win in the Haynes, Hanson and Clark Conditions Stakes at Newbury. He was then moved up to the highest level to contest the Racing Post Trophy at Doncaster, in which he defeated the Fillies' Mile winner, Fairy Heights.

=== 1994: three-year-old season ===
King's Theatre went into the winter of 1993–4 as a leading Derby candidate. On his 1994 debut, however, he proved himself to be a serious contender for the 2000 Guineas by taking a narrow victory in the Craven Stakes. Sent off as 9-2 favourite for the Guineas, he led early but faded into 13th place behind Mister Baileys. A well-beaten fourth place behind Erhaab in the Dante Stakes followed, and his price for the Derby drifted out to 14–1. At Epsom, however, he showed himself to be a top-class middle-distance performer, taking the lead a furlong from home and finishing second of the twenty-five runners behind Erhaab. As a result of his Epsom performance, he was sent off evens favourite for the Irish Derby and duly defeated his male rivals, but could only manage second place to the European Champion filly Balanchine.

In the King George VI and Queen Elizabeth Stakes he was sent off at 12-1 and produced his best performance. Always prominent, he was taken wide to make his challenge in the straight, took the lead a furlong out, and won by one and a quarter lengths from White Muzzle, with Erhaab well-beaten in seventh. The race was marred to some extent by the performance of Ezzoud, who unseated his jockey at the start and went on to interfere with several runners. King's Theatre continued to be tried at the highest level, but never won another race. Following his victory at Ascot, he finished third to Ezzoud in the International Stakes and tenth (beaten less than four lengths) behind Carnegie in the Prix de l'Arc de Triomphe.

=== 1995: four-year-old season ===
For the 1995 season, King's Theatre was moved to the US to be trained by Bill Mott. He failed to win in three starts, the best of them being a third place behind Kiri's Clown in the Sword Dancer Invitational Stakes at Saratoga.

=== 1996: five-year-old season ===
In the winter of 1995–1996 he was transferred to Sheikh Mohammed's Godolphin operation and was trained by Saeed bin Suroor. He made only two starts as a five-year-old, finishing second in a minor stakes race at Newbury and third of four to Strategic Choice in the Gran Premio di Milano. He was then retired to stud.

== Assessment ==
King's Theatre was rated the third best juvenile colt in Europe in 1993. At three he was rated at 128 by Timeform and named best three-year-old colt in the Cartier Racing Awards.

== Stud career ==
Retired to stand at stud in Ireland in 1997, King's Theatre had a long and reasonably successful career as a stallion. For several years he was a "shuttle" stallion- standing at the Ballylinch Stud, County Kilkenny for part of the year, before being "shuttled" to stand at the Glenlogan Stud Queensland, for the Southern Hemisphere breeding season. His winners on the flat included King's Drama (Sword Dancer Invitational Stakes), Young Mick (Cumberland Lodge Stakes), King's Ironbridge (Craven Stakes), Royal Code (Alister Clark Stakes) and Red Rioja (C. L. Weld Park Stakes).

Later in his stud career he became better known as the sire of several prominent jumpers, including Riverside Theatre (Ascot Chase, Ryanair Chase), Captain Chris (Arkle Challenge Trophy), Menorah (Supreme Novices' Hurdle), Wichita Lineman (Spa Novices' Hurdle), Voler la Vedette (Hatton's Grace Hurdle), Cue Card (Champion Bumper, Ascot Chase, Ryanair Chase, Betfair Chase) and The New One (Baring Bingham Novices' Hurdle).

King's Theatre died on 13 June 2011 after suffering complications following an operation for colic.

== Pedigree ==
Pedigree of King's Theatre (IRE), bay stallion, 1991
Sire Sadler's Wells (USA) 1981	Northern Dancer; 1961	Nearctic	Nearco
Sire Sadler's Wells (USA) 1981	Northern Dancer; 1961	Nearctic	Lady Angela
Sire Sadler's Wells (USA) 1981	Northern Dancer; 1961	Natalma	Native Dancer
Sire Sadler's Wells (USA) 1981	Northern Dancer; 1961	Natalma	Almahmoud
Sire Sadler's Wells (USA) 1981	Fairy Bridge; 1975	Bold Reason	Hail To Reason
Sire Sadler's Wells (USA) 1981	Fairy Bridge; 1975	Bold Reason	Lalun
Sire Sadler's Wells (USA) 1981	Fairy Bridge; 1975	Special	Forli
Sire Sadler's Wells (USA) 1981	Fairy Bridge; 1975	Special	Thong
Dam Regal Beauty (USA) 1981	Princely Native; 1971	Raise a Native	Native Dancer
Dam Regal Beauty (USA) 1981	Princely Native; 1971	Raise a Native	Raise You
Dam Regal Beauty (USA) 1981	Princely Native; 1971	Charlo	Francis S.
Dam Regal Beauty (USA) 1981	Princely Native; 1971	Charlo	Neutron
Dam Regal Beauty (USA) 1981	Dennis Belle; 1960	Crafty Admiral	Fighting Fox
Dam Regal Beauty (USA) 1981	Dennis Belle; 1960	Crafty Admiral	Admiral's Lady
Dam Regal Beauty (USA) 1981	Dennis Belle; 1960	Evasion	Spy Song
Dam Regal Beauty (USA) 1981	Dennis Belle; 1960	Evasion	Alnaire (Family: 9-b)
