= Forgive 'n Forget =

British racehorse

- Racing silks of Kilroe Civil Engineering Ltd
- Sire: Precipice Wood
- Dam: Tackienne
- Damsire: Hard Tack
- Sex: Gelding
- Foaled: 1977
- Country: Great Britain
- Colour: Chestnut
- Owner: Kilroe Civil Engineering Ltd
- Trainer: Jimmy FitzGerald

Major wins
- Coral Golden Hurdle Final (1983); Timeform Chase (1984, 1985); Cheltenham Gold Cup (1985); Edward Hanmer Chase (1985, 1986); Charlie Hall Chase (1986); Tommy Whittle Chase(1986); Vincent O’Brien Irish Gold Cup (1987)

Forgive 'n Forget (1977–1988) was an Irish-bred racehorse who developed into a top-class steeplechaser. He was held up and invariably travelled comfortably in his races but sometimes lacked fluency at his obstacles. His biggest success came when winning the 1985 running of the Cheltenham Gold Cup. He would later lose his life in the 1988 running of the same event.

== Background ==
Forgive 'n Forget was foaled in 1974 and went through the sales ring twice at Ballsbridge in Ireland. He was bought for 1,700 guineas as a foal and later sold on for 4,300 guineas as a three-year-old. His sire, Precipice Wood, won the 1970 Ascot Gold Cup and developed into a successful national hunt sire. Forgive 'n Forget's dam won a race over five furlongs on the flat in 1969. He is the last known Thoroughbred horse from the direct sire line through Hermit.

== Early career ==
Forgive 'n Forget went into training with W Brennan in Ireland where he won a bumpers event. He was then sold privately to builder Tim Kilroe and transferred to the stables of Jimmy FitzGerald in Yorkshire, England.

== 1982/1983 season ==
Forgive 'n Forget ran eight times over hurdles, winning on four occasions. He showed himself to be suited by a test of stamina. He passed the post first on both his opening two starts at Stratford and Worcester in October, but was demoted on the second occasion for interfering with the runner-up. After being beaten on his next two starts, Forgive 'n Forget competed in handicap company. After winning events at Catterick and Ayr in January, he was targeted at the Coral Golden Hurdle Final, run over three miles and one furlong at Cheltenham in March. In a field of thirty runners, Forgive 'n Forget carried second top weight of 11 st 6 lb, but was the subject of a gamble and started the 5/2 favourite. With Mark Dwyer in the saddle, Forgive 'n Forget gradually made progress from the rear of the field to move into third with three hurdles left to jump. He led at the last hurdle and went on to beat Brunton Park by three lengths. Forgive 'n Forget appeared once more, when reverting in distance to just over two-and-a-half miles at Aintree in April, where he ran poorly and was pulled up.

== 1983/1984 season ==
Forgive 'n Forget switched to fences during this season. He ran seven times, winning on two occasions. After finishing second on his seasonal debut, he unseated his rider on his next start before winning at Wetherby over the Christmas period, where he again faced Brunton Park, beating him by five lengths. He then lined up for the valuable Timeform Chase at Haydock Park. Forgive 'n Forget went to the front before the last fence and beat the Nicky Henderson-trained The Tsarevich by 2 1/2 lengths. On the strength of this performance, Forgive 'n Forget started the 11/4 favourite for the Sun Alliance Chase, the leading race for staying novice chasers. In a field of eighteen runners, John Francome, filling in for the injured Mark Dwyer, settled Forgive 'n Forget at the back of the field. Commenting on the ride, Timeform said, "We think even Francome would admit, with hindsight, that the task he set Forgive 'n Forget on the final circuit - he was still twenty five lengths behind the leaders passing the stands - was a very stiff one in such company." In the end the partnership made up a considerable amount of ground to hold a chance two fences from home, but could not make any further headway and eventually finished runners up, ten lengths behind A Kinsman. Forgive 'n Forget made his final appearance of the season in the staying novices' chase at Aintree two weeks later. He ran below his best, finishing unplaced behind Baron Blakeney.

== 1984/1985 season ==
At the beginning of the season Jimmy FitzGerald had announced that Forgive 'n Forget was the best horse he had ever trained, adding "I shall be very disappointed if he doesn’t win a Gold Cup one day". Forgive 'n Forget went on to win four of his seven starts during the season, including the Cheltenham Gold Cup on his final start. After beating a sole rival on his reappearance at Kelso, Forgive 'n Forget was beaten by Mossy Moore at Ayr in November but was subsequently found to have been troubled by an old back injury. He ran much better when next seen at Haydock Park in December, running the very useful Gaye Chance to a length in the Tommy Whittle Chase. Forgive 'n Forget returned to the winner's enclosure in the Rowland Meyrick Chase at Wetherby on Boxing Day when he gave weight and a comfortable beating to his three rivals. In the first week in February he ran in a handicap chase at Ascot, failing by a length and a half to concede 15 lb to Greenwood Lad after making a mistake at the final fence. On his final run before Cheltenham, Forgive 'n Forget repeated his previous season's victory in the Timeform Chase at Haydock Park. He was stretched to the limit to beat By The Way by a length-and-a-half, the first two pulling well clear of the remaining runners. The 1985 Cheltenham Gold Cup attracted a field of fifteen runners. Forgive 'n Forget started the 7/1 third favourite behind the David Elsworth-trained Combs Ditch, and the Scottish challenger Earl's Brig. The Monica Dickinson-trained pair Righthand Man and Wayward Lad were also prominent in the betting. Given his customary waiting ride by Mark Dwyer, Forgive 'n Forget moved into third place three fences from home, travelling comfortably with just Half Free and Drumadowney ahead of him. Forgive 'n Forget hit the front at the final fence and quickly built up an advantage. He passed the post a length-and-a-half in front of the staying-on Righthand Man with Earl's Brig back in third. Forgive 'n Forget ended the season with a Timeform rating of 166, 8 lb behind Burrough Hill Lad who missed the Gold Cup due to injury.

== 1985/1986 season ==
Forgive 'n Forget won on his reappearance but suffered defeats on his remaining four starts. The win came in the Edward Hanmer Chase at Haydock Park in November where he beat the only other finisher Richdee, after his main rival Wayward Lad unseated his rider. Forgive 'n Forget made his second appearance of the season at the same venue in the Tommy Whittle Chase, finishing a distant third behind Earl's Brig and Wayward Lad. The Raceform race reader at the course, Ivor Markham, described Forgive 'n Forget's run with, "pulled hard,held up,mistake 13th,chased leaders from 15th,ridden two out,eased when beaten flat." The Rowland Meyrick Chase at Wetherby was chosen for his next run, and Forgive 'n Forget was traveling best of all when unseating the deputising Ron O’Leary three fences from home. Connections of Forgive 'n Forget chose the Peter Marsh Chase at Haydock Park for his final run before Cheltenham. Starting favourite but carrying top weight, he made a mistake when challenging at the final fence and was unable to find extra on the run in. He finished fourth, over seven lengths off the winner, Combs Ditch. Eleven runners lined up for the 1986 Cheltenham Gold Cup. Forgive 'n Forget started the 7/2 second favourite behind the Irish mare Dawn Run. Other notable runners included Wayward Lad, Combs Ditch, and the improved Run And Skip. In a race famous for Dawn Run's dramatic victory, Forgive 'n Forget, under Mark Dwyer, made smooth headway from the rear and took the lead from Dawn Run approaching the final fence but was soon passed by Wayward Lad and the rallying Dawn Run. Forgive 'n Forget passed the line in third, beaten just over three lengths by the winner. He ended the season with a Timeform Rating of 169, the organisation of the opinion that the level of the form shown in finishing third in the Gold Cup was higher than when winning the race the previous season.

== 1986/1987 season ==
Forgive 'n Forget ran in six races, winning four times. He started the season with three wins in succession, beating the Peter Easterby-trained Cybrandian on each occasion. He quickened to beat his rival by half-a-length in the Charlie Hall Chase at Wetherby, giving away 8 lb to the runner up, with Wayward Lad back in third. They then met again in two events at Haydock Park which both attracted only three runners. The first was the Edward Hanmer Chase which Forgive 'n Forget was winning for the second time, conceding 16 lb to his rival. In the Tommy Whittle Chase Forgive 'n Forget had an easier task at level weights with the runner up. Forgive 'n Forget next appeared on Boxing Day when he lined up for the King George VI Chase at Kempton Park for the first time in his career. Starting the 2/1 favourite ahead of Combs Ditch, Bolands Cross and Wayward Lad, Forgive 'n Forget lacked fluency in his jumping and though moving into second place with three fences left to jump, never looked likely to get to grips with the front-running Desert Orchid, who would subsequently win the race three more times. Forgive 'n Forget eventually finished fourth, twenty-two lengths off the winner. In February he was sent over to Leopardstown in Ireland for the first running of the Vincent O’Brien Irish Gold Cup. In a nine-runner field, Forgive 'n Forget went off favourite ahead of fellow English challenger Very Promising, and put up one of the best performances of his career. Travelling smoothly throughout the race, he pulled clear over the final two fences to beat Very Promising by eight lengths. The performance in Ireland contributed to him heading the 1987 Cheltenham Gold Cup market at 5/4. Eleven runners faced him, with The Thinker, Bolands Cross, Combs Ditch and Door Latch following him in the betting. In a renewal that saw the start time delayed by over one hour due to a snow blizzard, Forgive 'n Forget was never fluent at his obstacles and finished in seventh place, nearly twenty lengths behind the winner, The Thinker. Forgive 'n Forget ended the season with a Timeform Rating of 169, 8 lb behind the organisation's highest-rated chaser of the season, Desert Orchid.

== 1987/1988 season ==
Forgive 'n Forget ran five times without registering a success in a season that would end in tragedy. He made his seasonal reappearance in the Edward Hanmer Chase, where he was beaten twenty lengths by the in form Beau Ranger, giving away 20 lb in weight. Forgive 'n Forget next appeared in the King George VI Chase. Starting third in the betting behind Desert Orchid and Beau Ranger, he was held in second place when falling at the final fence. The race was won by the French-trained outsider Nupsala. Forgive 'n Forget was next seen when attempting to follow up his previous season's victory in the Vincent O’Brien Irish Gold Cup. Starting odds-on, he could never get on terms with Playschool, finishing an eight-length runner up at the finish. In his preparation run for the Cheltenham Gold Cup, connections brought Forgive 'n Forget back in trip to two-and-a-half miles, in the John Francome Chase at Worcester. In a four-horse field that included Beau Ranger and Panto Prince, Forgive 'n Forget ran an encouraging race to finish third, beaten less than four lengths by the winner. Raceform's representative at the meeting returned the following commentary in the form book: "Chased leaders, stayed on flat." The 1988 Cheltenham Gold Cup was attracted a field of fifteen runners and was run in soft ground. Playschool went off the 100/30 favourite ahead of Kildimo and Cavvies Clown, with Forgive 'n Forget, now an eleven-year-old, starting at 8/1 alongside Nupsala. Approaching the fourth fence from the finish, Forgive 'n Forget had only Cavvies Clown and Charter Party ahead of him, the race looking to be between the three of them. After jumping the fence in third place, Mark Dwyer suddenly pulled Forgive 'n Forget up. The horse was found to have sustained a broken hind leg and was put down immediately. The race went to Charter Party, who passed the line ahead of Cavvies Clown and Beau Ranger. Reflecting whether the incident cost Forgive 'n Forget the race, Timeform stated, "Whether he would have won is a moot point: he looked to be moving easiest of the three." The organisation gave him a rating of 169 for the third season running, with Desert Orchid again ending the season as their highest-rated chaser.
