= Little Owl (horse) =

Irish-bred Thoroughbred racehorse

- Racing silks of Mrs B Gundry and Mr R J Wilson
- Sire: Cantab
- Grandsire: Cantaber
- Dam: Black Spangle
- Damsire: Black Tarquin
- Sex: Gelding
- Foaled: 1974
- Country: Great Britain
- Colour: Bay
- Owner: Mrs B Gundry, Mr R J Wilson
- Trainer: Peter Easterby at Habton Grange near Malton, North Yorkshire
- Record: 33: 16-4-2

Major wins
- Dipper Novices' Chase (1980); West of Scotland Pattern Novices' Chase (1980); Reynoldstown Novices' Chase (1980); Peter Marsh Chase (1981); Tote Double Chase (1981); Timeform Chase (1981); Cheltenham Gold Cup (1981); Tommy Whittle Chase (1982)

Awards
- Timeform rating: 176

Little Owl was an English trained racehorse. Undefeated in his first eight completed starts over fences, he was described by Timeform as "potentially one of the most talented steeplechasers since Arkle". Particularly after winning a notably strong Cheltenham Gold Cup in 1981. However, after a series of injuries and a general drop in form, he was never to fulfill his promise and ended his career competing in hunter chases.

== Background ==
Little Owl was a bay gelding who was purchased at the 1977 Doncaster August Sales by his trainer at the price of 2,300guineas. His Sire, Cantab, was a useful horse on the flat before switching to the jumps for trainer Ryan Price. His most notable efforts were winning the 1961 Triumph Hurdle and finishing fourth in the 1962 Champion Hurdle. A successful jumps sire, his leading progeny included Little Polveir (1989 Grand National), The Thinker (1987 Cheltenham Gold Cup), Ballyross (1978 Powers Gold Cup) and Canton (1983 Scottish Grand National). His dam, Black Spangle, was a lightly raced half sister to Little Tom - a prolific jumps winner in Ireland and France while her dam, Spangle, was a seven-time winner over hurdles. Little Owl's siblings were pointers and platers of little note.

== Racing career ==
=== 1977/78 season ===
Little Owl's career began in a juvenile hurdle on 1 March 1978 at Wetherby where he ran out an eight length winner. He followed up in two further novice events at the same venue during the spring, ending the season unbeaten in three starts.

=== 1978/79 season ===
After winning a qualifier for the Coral Golden Handicap Hurdle (currently known as the Pertemps Final at Nottingham, Little Owl was sent off favourite while carrying more weight than all but one of his opponents. Despite the race being only his fifth start, he ran with credit chasing home Willie Wumpkins (ironically ridden by Jim Wilson who would become Little Owl's regular jockey) who was six years his senior. Little Owl failed to win his next three starts but regained the winning thread at Market Rasen on his first start under leading amateur Jim Wilson. While success was seemingly assured, the jockey mistook the winning post and had to be rousted along to maintain his position at the finish. No such mistake was made on his next and final outing of the season at Wetherby where, despite conceding 33lb, Little Owl won by twenty lengths from Silversmith who himself had won four races that season. While he did not race outside of handicap company, Little Owl's progression was such that he wound up being rated that season's leading staying hurdler by Timeform - ahead of Stayers' Hurdle winner, Lighter.

=== 1979/80 season ===
Instead of challenging the top staying hurdlers, Little Owl was sent novice chasing and he made his seasonal debut in the Dipper Novices' Chase at Newcastle. Despite conceding experience and race fitness to all of his opponents, he jumped immaculately and comfortably prevailed by a length and a half from Peterhof, a former Triumph Hurdle winner and twice placed in the Stayers' Hurdle in what would be that horses' last start. He was less convincing in his jumping a fortnight later in the West of Scotland Pattern Novices' Chase at Ayr where he beat Irish raider Romany Count by half a length although to his credit, he was giving away 10lb over a trip short of his optimum. Little Owl was seen to better effect next time over three miles in the Reynoldstown Novices' Chase at Ascot where he was well fancied to make it three from three over fences. Again he made several mistakes, blamed on the roving television camera by his jockey, and was still eight lengths behind when Caper's Lad sadly took a fatal fall four out. While whether Little Owl would have won that day was a matter of contention, in the end, he did win the contest by twelve lengths from the average Martinstown. With a perfect record over fences, Little Owl went into the Sun Alliance Chase as a well fancied second favourite behind Edward O'Grady's 1978 Stayers' Hurdle winner Flame Gun. However, the jumping problems which dogged him throughout the season ended his race at the tenth fence.

=== 1980/81 season ===
It was the Saturday before Christmas when Little Owl made a winning seasonal reappearance at Doncaster in a conditions event. A race over two and a half miles he was expected to win easily and did so by twenty lengths. He had been purchased by the Wilson family since his last start and it would be Jim Wilson who would ride Little Owl for the rest of his career. Little Owl stepped up in class for his next start in the Peter Marsh Handicap Chase at Haydock. Among his rivals were the veteran Tied Cottage, who finished eight lengths ahead in the previous season's Gold Cup before losing the race due to a drug test, Ballet Lord, winner of the previous season's Rowland Meyrick Handicap Chase and Straight Jocelyn, twice a winner already that season at Lingfield. Prior to the race, Little Owl was quoted at 14/1 for the Gold Cup alongside Tied Cottage. However, after the latter fell at the eleventh, Little Owl opened up a large lead in the back straight and with sound jumping and resolute galloping, he won by an easy fifteen lengths from Straight Jocelyn, moving towards the head of the Gold Cup market in the process. One week later, he contested the Tote Double Chase at Cheltenham and with Henry Kissinger, who had hitherto won all four completed starts, his only realistic opponent on paper, Little Owl was sent off 8/11 favourite. Due to heavy fog, not much was seen of the race itself. Nevertheless, he reportedly jumped well and in the end, won by six lengths from unfancied novice Lesley Ann (who incidentally, went on to win the Sun Alliance Chase six weeks later. Little Owl returned to Haydock for his final prep race to contest the inaugural running of the Timeform Chase. A valuable race established for novices and second season chasers, it attracted a small field and was effectively a match between Little Owl and leading northern novice Wayward Lad. In the event, Wayward Lad fell four from home leaving Little Owl to win by twelve lengths from Fairy King - a winner of two decent handicaps at Ascot and Cheltenham who was in receipt of 10lb.

==== 1981 Cheltenham Gold Cup ====
In recent seasons, the Cheltenham Gold Cup was going through a spell in the doldrums. After Tied Cottage's disqualification, the previous renewal fell to Master Smudge, a horse beaten in his six previous starts and whose timeform rating of 150 was decidedly below championship standard. In 1979, the race was taken by Alverton whose fatal fall in that year's Grand National brought much bad publicity to the sport. Indeed, it wasn't since 1975 that a Gold Cup winner achieved a timeform rating of 170 or above. However, despite the absences of the likes of Venture To Cognac, Bright Highway and Border Incident, the 1981 renewal was regarded as one of the strongest fields assembled in years. The market was headed by Silver Buck who had won twelve of his thirteen previous starts including two King George VI Chases. Next in the betting was Little Owl who was joint second favourite with stablemate and dual champion hurdler Night Nurse. Dual Punchestown Chase winner and twice King George VI Chase runner up Jack Of Trumps also featured prominently alongside fellow Irish raider Tied Cottage. Other notable runners included Royal Bond (Premier Chase), 1978 victor Midnight Court, top handicapper Diamond Edge and leading hunter chaser Spartan Missile.

Tied Cottage forced a strong pace from the front but the shape of the race changed when unseating jockey Liam O'Donnell with over a circuit to go. Diamond Edge was left in the lead as they set out on their final lap and was soon joined by Night Nurse with Little Owl tracking them closely in third. Night Nurse increased the tempo and on jumping the final ditch six out, led ahead of Little Owl, Diamond Edge, Silver Buck and Spartan Missile while Royal Bond, who wasn't far behind, made a terrible blunder which put him out of contention. While Night Nurse jumped and travelled well throughout, he was joined at the third last by Little Owl and Silver Buck. The latter two began to pull away approaching the penultimate fence where Silver Buck's error gave Little Owl a clear advantage. With another fine jump over the last, Little Owl galloped resolutely up the Cheltenham hill being chased all the while by Night Nurse as Silver Buck's stamina gave way. Little Owl never looked like getting caught and held off his stablemate's challenge by a length and a half at the line. Having only his ninth start over fences at the young age of seven, Little Owl's display of sound jumping and plentiful class had writers mentioning Peter Easterby's charge in the same breath as Pendil and Captain Christy. However, given the inherent fragility of steeplechasers, Little Owl would never again attain those heights again nor would he contest another Gold Cup.

=== 1981/82 season ===
Like others at Peter Easterby's Habton Grange stables, Little Owl was affected by a virus infection and his comeback was delayed until New Year's Eve for a two and a half mile handicap chase at Cheltenham. Re-opposing old rivals Royal Bond and Henry Kissinger, he began as favourite under top weight. However, he got no further than the eleventh fence when falling while disputing the lead. His second start in the three runner Fulwell Chase was shrouded in controversy after he was pulled up due to the bit slipping through his mouth. Questions were raised after large sums were placed on forecasts involving the other two runners Venture To Cognac, returning after a thirteen-month absence, and Great Dean, a 66/1 shot who'd failed to complete his previous two starts. Nevertheless, within a week, the Betting Office Licencees Association determined "there is no reason to withhold payment". In between the Kempton race and his next start at Ascot, he drifted out from 7/2 favourite to 8/1 despite assurances from his owners that nothing was amiss. It was in Ascot's Whitbread Trial Handicap Chase where he met his first defeat when completing over fences. Although disappointing, the effort was still respectable as he beaten by less than twelve lengths while giving away upwards of 19lbs to Grand National winners Aldaniti and Grittar. Little Owl returned to the track nine days later for a handicap chase at Newcastle where he took a heavy fall while not appearing to travel well. This would be his last appearance of the season and he was hobdayed over the summer.

=== 1982/83 season ===
Little Owl returned to the track ten months later in the aptly named "Last Chance Chase", a minor conditions event at Nottingham, where he won in a canter. He followed up with another success nine days later where he defeated Bregawn by ten lengths in the Tommy Whittle Chase. Although it later transpired that Bregawn was running with a pulled muscle. Nevertheless, these two successes rekindled faith in Little Owl as he was sent off as 5/2 second favourite for the King George VI chase splitting Silver Buck and Wayward Lad in the betting. However, while he jumped well in the most part, he could only manage a distant fourth. His next start was in the Peter Marsh Chase, a race which he had won two years prior. Giving upwards of 10lbs away to the likes of Venture To Cognac, Lesley Ann and Ashley House (two handicap wins in past month), he wasn't disgraced in being beaten by less than ten lengths although he did fail to see out the race finishing fourth. He was out a fortnight later for the Gainsborough Chase at Sandown where he once again failed to see out the race, finishing over twenty lengths behind Observe (who went on to win that season's Cathcart Challenge Cup) and the ten year old Royal Judgement. This was his last race for the season and along with another breathing operation over the summer, he was also diagnosed with a trapped epiglottis.

=== 1983/84 season ===
Little Owl's seasonal reappearance came with an attempt at successive victories in Haydock's Tommy Whittle Chase. The task was made easier when odds on favourite, Bregawn, fell three from home although he still had to play second fiddle to Prince Rowan who was no better than a decent handicapper. Not entered for the King George VI Chase, Little Owl contested the Rowland Meyrick Handicap Chase at Wetherby instead where he finished fifth behind Phil The Fluter while conceding weight all round. His final start of the season came in the Anthony Mildmay, Peter Cazalet Memorial Chase where following a first fence unseat, he tore ligaments and muscles in his hind quarters and sustained a suspected broken pelvis after galloping loose.

=== 1984/85 season ===
For his final season, Little Owl joined trainer John Edwards and competed in a pair of hunter chases. In his first hunter chase, he was beaten thirty two lengths into sixth before finishing a similar distance into second behind old rival Royal Judgement at Wincanton.

== Races ==
Date	Finish	Race	Dist	Going	Jockey	Margin	Winner/Runner up	Odds	Track
1 March 1978	1st	Harewood Novices' Hurdle	2m	Heavy	J J O'Neill	8	Pennine Derek	6/1	Wetherby
27 March 1978	1st	Bilton Novices' Hurdle	2m	Good to Soft	J J O'Neill	n/a	Temuco	Evsf	Wetherby
3 May 1978	1st	City Varieties Novices' Hurdle	2m	Good to Soft	J J O'Neill	n/a	Treasure Island	4/11f	Wetherby
16 December 1978	1st	Coral Golden Handicap Hurdle (Qualifier)	2m6f	Soft	J J O'Neill	1.5	Longacre	15/2	Nottingham
13 March 1979	2nd	Coral Golden Handicap Hurdle	3m	Heavy	J J O'Neill	5	Willie Wumpkins	9/2f	Cheltenham
29 March 1979	4th	Emlyn Hughes Handicap Hurdle	2m5f	Soft	J J O'Neill	13.75	Varalgo	11/4f	Aintree
17 April 1979	3rd	Montagu Handicap Hurdle	2m4f	Good	Mr T Easterby	4	Manton Castle	11/2	Wetherby
7 May 1979	2nd	Sunday Sun Handicap Hurdle	2m4f	Good	Mr T Easterby	2	Royal Navy	5/1	Newcastle
19 May 1979	1st	Handicap Hurdle^{[1]}	3m	Good	Mr A Wilson	.75	Star Music	5/1	Market Rasen
28 May 1979	1st	Headley Handicap Hurdle	2m4f	Soft	Mr A Wilson	20	Silversmith	9/4	Wetherby
11 January 1980	1st	Dipper Novices' Chase	3m	Heavy	J J O'Neill	1.5	Peterhof	9/4f	Newcastle
25 January 1980	1st	West of Scotland Pattern Novices' Chase	2m4f	Good to Soft	J J O'Neill	.5	Romany Court	8/11f	Ayr
13 February 1980	1st	Reynoldstown Novices' Chase	3m	Good to Soft	J J O'Neill	12	Martinstown	11/10f	Ascot
12 March 1980	Fell	Sun Alliance Chase	3m	Heavy	J J O'Neill	n/a	Lacson	9/4	Cheltenham
20 December 1980	1st	David M. Adams Developments Chase	2m4f	Good to Soft	Mr A Wilson	20	Cape Felix	10/11f	Doncaster
24 January 1981	1st	Peter Marsh Chase	3m	Soft	Mr A Wilson	15	Straight Jocelyn	4/6f	Haydock Park
31 January 1981	1st	Tote Double Chase	3m1f	Good	Mr A Wilson	6	Lesley Ann	8/11f	Cheltenham
7 March 1981	1st	Timeform Chase	2m4f	Heavy	Mr A Wilson	12	Fairy King	4/5f	Haydock Park
19 March 1981	1st	Cheltenham Gold Cup	3m2f	Heavy	Mr A Wilson	1.5	Night Nurse	6/1	Cheltenham
31 December 1981	Fell	Colt Car Diamond Handicap Chase	2m4f	Heavy	Mr A Wilson	n/a	Royal Bond	9/4f	Cheltenham
23 January 1982	PU	Fulwell Chase	3m	Soft	Mr A Wilson	n/a	Venture To Cognac	4/11f	Kempton Park
10 February 1982	5th	Whitbread Trial Handicap Chase	3m	Good	Mr A Wilson	10.75	Cavity Hunter	9/4	Ascot
19 February 1982	Fell	Trout Chase	3m	Soft	Mr A Wilson	n/a	Peaty Sandy	Evsf	Newcastle
6 December 1982	1st	Last Chance Chase	3m	Good	Mr A Wilson	12	Kalkashanndi	8/15f	Nottingham
15 December 1982	1st	Tommy Whittle Chase	3m	Soft	Mr A Wilson	10	Bregawn	9/4	Haydock Park
27 December 1982	4th	King George VI Chase	3m	Good to Soft	Mr A Wilson	28.5	Wayward Lad	5/2	Kempton Park
22 January 1983	4th	Peter Marsh Chase	3m	Good to Soft	Mr A Wilson	9	Ashley House	11/2	Haydock Park
22 January 1983	3rd	Gainsborough Chase	3m1f	Soft	Mr A Wilson	22	Observe	6/1	Sandown Park
14 December 1983	2nd	Tommy Whittle Chase	3m	Good	Mr A Wilson	5	Prince Rowan	4/1	Haydock Park
26 December 1983	5th	Rowland Meyrick Handicap Chase	3m	Good to Soft	Mr A Wilson	8.5	Phil The Fluter	9/2	Wetherby
7 January 1984	UR	Anthony Mildmay, Peter Cazalet Memorial Chase	3m5f	Good	Mr A Wilson	n/a	Burrough Hill Lad	14/1	Sandown Park
26 February 1985	6th	Dingley Bell Hunters' Chase	2m6f	Good	Mr A Wilson	32	Golden Ty	6/1	Nottingham
7 March 1985	2nd	Hine Cognac Hunter Chase	3m1f	Good to Soft	Mr A Wilson	30	Royal Judgement	5/1	Wincanton

^{1} Full race title;- Dorothy Viscountess Portman Memorial Long Distance Handicap Hurdle

== Pedigree ==
Pedigree of Little Owl (IRE), bay gelding, 1974
Sire Cantab (IRE) 1957	Cantaber (FR); 1946	Djebel (FR); 1937	Tourbillon (FR) 1928
Sire Cantab (IRE) 1957	Cantaber (FR); 1946	Djebel (FR); 1937	Loika (FR) 1926
Sire Cantab (IRE) 1957	Cantaber (FR); 1946	Polaris (FR); 1941	Pharis (FR) 1936
Sire Cantab (IRE) 1957	Cantaber (FR); 1946	Polaris (FR); 1941	Pompeia (FR) 1928
Sire Cantab (IRE) 1957	Balek (FR); 1946	Mehemet Ali (GB); 1938	Felicitation (GB) 1930
Sire Cantab (IRE) 1957	Balek (FR); 1946	Mehemet Ali (GB); 1938	Firouze Mahal (IRE) 1922
Sire Cantab (IRE) 1957	Balek (FR); 1946	Balaclava (FR); 1941	Plassy (GB) 1932
Sire Cantab (IRE) 1957	Balek (FR); 1946	Balaclava (FR); 1941	Ballili (FR) 1936
Dam Black Spangle (GB) 1965	Black Tarquin (USA); 1945	Rhodes Scholar (FR); 1933	Pharos (GB) 1920
Dam Black Spangle (GB) 1965	Black Tarquin (USA); 1945	Rhodes Scholar (FR); 1933	Book Law (GB) 1924
Dam Black Spangle (GB) 1965	Black Tarquin (USA); 1945	Vagrancy (USA); 1939	Sir Gallahad (FR) 1920
Dam Black Spangle (GB) 1965	Black Tarquin (USA); 1945	Vagrancy (USA); 1939	Valkyr (USA) 1925
Dam Black Spangle (GB) 1965	Spangle (GB); 1947	Flamenco (GB); 1931	Flamingo (GB) 1925
Dam Black Spangle (GB) 1965	Spangle (GB); 1947	Flamenco (GB); 1931	Valescure (GB) 1917
Dam Black Spangle (GB) 1965	Spangle (GB); 1947	Vestarsome (IRE); 1936	Vesington Star (IRE) 1921
Dam Black Spangle (GB) 1965	Spangle (GB); 1947	Vestarsome (IRE); 1936	Fusome (IRE) 1918
