= The Thinker (horse) =

Irish-bred Thoroughbred racehorse

- Racing silks of Tom McDonagh
- Sire: Cantab
- Grandsire: Cantaber
- Dam: Maine Pet
- Damsire: Light Year
- Sex: Gelding
- Foaled: 20 April 1978
- Country: Ireland
- Colour: Chestnut
- Breeder: Victor Semple
- Owner: Tom McDonagh
- Trainer: Arthur Stephenson

Major wins
- Midlands Grand National (1986); Cheltenham Gold Cup (1987); Tommy Whittle Chase (1988)

The Thinker (20 April 1978 – 4 April 1991) was an Irish-bred British-trained Thoroughbred racehorse, best known for his win in the 1987 Cheltenham Gold Cup.

== Background ==
The Thinker was a chestnut gelding bred in Ireland by Victor Semple. He was sired by Cantab, a successful hurdler who won the Triumph Hurdle in 1961 before becoming a successful National Hunt stallion. His other progeny included Little Polveir, Little Owl (Cheltenham Gold Cup) and Dixton House (National Hunt Handicap Chase). Cantab was a representative of the Byerley Turk sire line, unlike more than 95% of modern thoroughbreds, who descend directly from the Darley Arabian. The Thinker was the best racer produced by the unraced Maine Pet, but his full-sister Heather-Can did place in a few National Hunt flat and hurdle races in 1979 and 1980.

As a young horse, The Thinker was bought by Arthur Stephenson and entered the ownership of Tom McDonnagh. He was trained in County Durham by Stephenson, who was known for consistently winning numerous minor races at northern racecourses, his motto being "little fish are sweet".

== Racing career ==
=== Early career ===
In November 1985 at Ayr, The Thinker won the Joan Mackay Handicap Race against eight other horses at 14-1 odds. Running in the W.L. Hector Christie Memorial Trophy at Catterick in December 1985 and ridden by Kevin Jones, The Thinker was an 11-8 favourite and "appeared to have the race sewn up" when he was defeated by a neck by a late challenge from Hazy Glen. He did not finish the Townton Handicap Chase at Wetherby later in December 1985 having been pulled up during the race. In January 1986, he was unplaced for the Stokesley Handicap Chase at Catterick. In February 1986, The Thinker won the Stanwix Handicap Chase in Carlisle defeating the Grand National placer Mr. Snugfit. He was unplaced in the March 1987 running of the Kim Muir Memorial Challenge Trophy at Cheltenham. In April 1986, The Thinker recorded his first major win when he won the Midlands Grand National at Uttoxeter Racecourse in snowy conditions. He won the County of Ayr Handicap Chase in May. He was unplaced in the November 1986 Charlie Hall Memorial Wetherby Pattern Chase and the November 1986 Joan Mackay Handicap Chase at Ayr. On 27 December 1986, The Thinker won the Rowland Meyrick Handicap Chase at Wetherby. He was unplaced in the January 1987 Peter Marsh Chase. The Thinker was entered in the 1987 Grand National but was withdrawn shortly before the start due to Stephenson's concerns about the muddy course conditions and the results of a training gallop the morning of the race.

=== 1987 Cheltenham Gold Cup ===
The 1987 Cheltenham Gold Cup, run on 19 March was the 60th running of Britain's most prestigious steeplechase. Arthur Stephenson was not at Cheltenham, preferring to attend the meeting at Hexham, where he had seven runners, and The Thinker was taken to the course by Stephenson's nephew Peter Cheeseborough. The twelve runner field was headed by the 5/4 favourite Forgive 'n' Forget who had won the race in 1985, whilst the other runners included Door Latch and Bolands Cross (second and third behind Desert Orchid in the King George VI Chase, Wayward Lad, Charter Party, Combs Ditch, Earls Brig and West Tip. The Thinker, ridden by Ridley Lamb started at odds of 13/2 after considerable late support from gamblers who felt he would be well-suited by the testing conditions. An hour before the race, snow fell heavily on the course rendering the conditions virtually unraceable and the runners for the Gold Cup, having made their way to the start, were recalled to the paddock. After a delay of well over an hour, during which the snow began to melt, the runners were recalled to the start and the race began. Lamb settled The Thinker towards the rear of the field in the early stages as Cybrandian led the field on the first circuit. Charter Party fell at the fifth whilst Earls Brig was pulled up early on the second circuit and Bolands Cross fell at the fifteenth. Four fences from the finish, Cybrandian led from Door Latch, but The Thinker had made steady progress into third ahead of Forgive 'n' Forget, Wayward Lad and Combs Ditch. The Thinker moved into second but made a bad jumping error at the third last and turned into the straight in third place behind Cybrandian and Wayward Lad. The Thinker maintained his position over the last two fences before tracking to the right on the run-in and producing a strong late run to overtake Cybrandian in the last hundred yards and win by one and a half lengths. Door Latch and West Tip finished well to take third and fourth ahead of Wayward Lad.

=== Later career ===
The Thinker won the Peter Marsh Limited Handicap Chase at Haydock Park in January 1988 against West Tip. In the 1988/9 season, The Thinker won a minor race at Kelso Racecourse and then took the listed Tommy Whittle Chase at Haydock Park, taking the lead at the second last and winning easily by twelve lengths from Kissane. He then finished third under top weight of 164 pounds in the Welsh National and fell at the tenth fence in the Cheltenham Gold Cup. On 8 April, The Thinker again carried 164 pounds when top weight for the 1989 Grand National. Ridden by Simon Sherwood, he lost his position on the second circuit but stayed on strongly in the closing stages and finished third of the forty runners behind Little Polveir and West Tip. On his only other appearance of the season The Thinker was pulled up in the Whitbread Gold Cup.

In the following season The Thinker failed to win in four starts but finished second in the Edward Hanmer Chase, the Tommy Whittle Chase and the Greenall Whitley Gold Cup. In December 1990, The Thinker returned after a nine-month break to finish third in the Rowland Meyrick Handicap Chase at Wetherby Racecourse. The Thinker was being prepared for a run in the 1991 Grand National when he broke his left hind leg when cantering at Aintree two days before the race and was euthanised at the age of thirteen.

== Pedigree ==
Pedigree of The Thinker (IRE), chestnut gelding, 1978
Sire Cantab (IRE) 1957	Cantaber (FR); 1946	Djebel	Tourbillon
Sire Cantab (IRE) 1957	Cantaber (FR); 1946	Djebel	Loika
Sire Cantab (IRE) 1957	Cantaber (FR); 1946	Polaris	Pharis
Sire Cantab (IRE) 1957	Cantaber (FR); 1946	Polaris	Pompeia
Sire Cantab (IRE) 1957	Balek (FR); 1946	Mehemet Ali	Felicitation
Sire Cantab (IRE) 1957	Balek (FR); 1946	Mehemet Ali	Firouze Mahal
Sire Cantab (IRE) 1957	Balek (FR); 1946	Balaclava	Plassy
Sire Cantab (IRE) 1957	Balek (FR); 1946	Balaclava	Ballili
Dam Maine Pet (GB) 1965	Light Year (IRE); 1958	Chamier	Chamossaire
Dam Maine Pet (GB) 1965	Light Year (IRE); 1958	Chamier	Therapia
Dam Maine Pet (GB) 1965	Light Year (IRE); 1958	Spring Light	Signal Light
Dam Maine Pet (GB) 1965	Light Year (IRE); 1958	Spring Light	Gold Mary
Dam Maine Pet (GB) 1965	Arklow Lass (GB); 1957	Straight Deal	Solario
Dam Maine Pet (GB) 1965	Arklow Lass (GB); 1957	Straight Deal	Good Deal
Dam Maine Pet (GB) 1965	Arklow Lass (GB); 1957	Meadowbrook	Birikan
Dam Maine Pet (GB) 1965	Arklow Lass (GB); 1957	Meadowbrook	Meadow Fescue (Family 21)
