= Prelude Handicap Chase =

Prelude Handicap Chase
2017
Ballybolley	Guitar Pete	Master Dee

Previous years
2016
Vintage Vinnie	Presenting Arms	Ballykan
2015
Oscar Rock	Claret Cloak	Cloud Creeper
2014
Mart Lane	Dursey Sound	Houston Dynimo
2013
Bouggler	Rob Conti	Kian's Delight
2012
The Disengager	Bobowen	Mahogany Blaze
2011
Benny Be Good	Buck Mulligan	Neptune Equester
2010
Silmi	Five Dream	Qulinton
2009
Valley Ride	War Of The World	From Dawn To Dusk
2008
Always Waining	Breaking Silence	Iron Man

The Prelude Handicap Chase was a Listed National Hunt chase in Great Britain which was open to horses aged four years or older. It was run at Market Rasen over a distance of about 2 miles and 5½ furlongs (4,325 metres), and was scheduled to take place each year in September.

The race was first run in 2004 and was awarded Listed status in 2008. It was discontinued from 2024 onwards, although the 2022 running was the last as the 2023 edition was cancelled due to waterlogging.

== Winners ==
Year	Winner	Age	Weight	Jockey	Trainer
2004	Bow Strada	7	10–12	Richard Johnson	Philip Hobbs
2005	Little Big Horse	9	10–04	Dominic Elsworth	Sue Smith
2006	Kings Brook	6	11–04	Timmy Murphy	Nick Williams
2007	Iron Man	6	11–12	Paddy Merrigan	Peter Bowen
2008	Always Waining	7	11–00	Tom O'Brien	Peter Bowen
2009	Valley Ride	9	10–01	D Devereux	Peter Bowen
2010	Silmi	6	10–00	Richie McLernon	Mrs S Leech
2011	Benny Be Good	8	11–08	James Reveley	Keith Reveley
2012	The Disengager	8	11–00	Richard Johnson	Philip Hobbs
2013	Bouggler	8	10–11	Aidan Coleman	Emma Lavelle
2014	Mart Lane	9	10–09	Daryl Jacob	Richard Newland
2015	Oscar Rock	7	11–04	Brian Hughes	Malcolm Jefferson
2016	Vintage Vinnie	7	10–09	Jonathan Moore	Rebecca Curtis
2017	Ballybolley	8	11–09	Daryl Jacob	Nigel Twiston-Davies
2018	Royal Village	7	10–09	Tom O'Brien	Ian Williams
2019	Copper West	6	10–04	Jonathan Moore	Rebecca Curtis
2020	Fidux	7	11–06	Tom Bellamy	Alan King
2021	Senior Citizen	8	10–13	Adrian Heskin	Alan King
2022	Kiltealy Briggs	8	11–06	Adrian Heskin	Jamie Snowden
(Note: The 2023 running was abandoned due to a waterlogged course)	no race 2023

== See also ==
- List of British National Hunt races
