= Wayward Lad =

British-bred Thoroughbred racehorse (1975–2003)

- Sire: Royal Highway
- Grandsire: Straight Deal
- Dam: Loughanmore
- Damsire: Bargello
- Sex: Gelding
- Foaled: 1975
- Country: Great Britain
- Colour: Dark Bay or Brown
- Trainer: Michael Dickinson
- Record: 53: 28 - 12 - 7
- Earnings: £218,732

Major wins
- West of Scotland Novices' Chase (1981); Peterborough Chase (1981, 1983); Welsh Champion Chase (1981, 1982); Timeform Chase (1982); King George VI Chase (1982, 1983, 1985); Charlie Hall Chase (1983, 1985); Edward Hanmer Chase (1984); Whitbread Gold Label Cup Chase (1985, 1987); Timeform rating: 175

Honours
- Wayward Lad Novices' Chase at Kempton Park

Wayward Lad (1975-2003) was a successful English Thoroughbred National Hunt racehorse. He was one of the "Dickinson five" (Michael Dickinson-trained horses that took the first five places at the 1983 Cheltenham Gold Cup). The horse's career ended in spring 1987 with a second success in the Whitbread Gold Label Chase at Aintree. By then he had won 28 of his 53 races on 16 different tracks. That final success, at the 1987 Grand National meeting, brought his career earnings to £218,732, at the time a sum beaten only by Dawn Run. His most prestigious wins came in the King George VI Chase, which he won for a third time in 1985. Wayward Lad also finished a close second to Dawn Run in the Cheltenham Gold Cup in 1986, on a course on which he never won in nine races. A row between his owners resulted in the horse going to the Doncaster sales, where Tony Dickinson (Michael's father) bought him for 42,000 Guineas. He was then sent into retirement with his son, who had begun a new career training in the USA. The Sporting Life opined: "One cannot dispute this horse's consistent excellence over a period of nine years".

== Races ==
Date	Finish	Race	Dist	Going	Jockey	Margin	Winner/Runner up	Odds	Track	Ran	Ref
19 November 1979	1st	Stoughton Novices' Hurdle Div.II	2m	Good	C Tinkler	6	Rennuci	85/40f	Leicester	26	
29 November 1979	1st	Garswood Pattern Hurdle	2m	Good	T Carmody	n/a	Abercata	1/2f	Haydock	6	
15 December 1979	1st	Philip Cornes Novices' Hurdle Qualifier	2m6f	Soft	K Whyte	4	Three Bars	10/11f	Nottingham	23	
29 December 1979	2nd	Panama Cigar Hurdle Qualifier	2m	Soft	T Carmody	2.5	Lumen	Evsf	Newbury	16	
21 February 1980	1st	Lower Swell Novices Trial	2m5f	Heavy	T Carmody	3	Prelko	7/4f	Warwick	20	
1 March 1980	2nd	Philip Cornes Saddle Of Gold Hurdle Final	3m1f	Good to Soft	K Whyte	3	Woodford Prince	4/5f	Newbury	10	
14 March 1980	1st	Shamrock Novices Hurdle	2m4f	Heavy	T Carmody	1.5	Sable Pieces	2/7f	Chepstow	19	
28 March 1980	1st	Maghull Novices Hurdle	2m5½f	Heavy	T Carmody	6	Lavengro	15/8f	Aintree	16	
15 November 1980	2nd	Lambert & Butler Premier Chase (Qualifier)	2m4f	Heavy	T Carmody	1.5	Raise A Bounty	7/4f	Newcastle	7	
12 December 1980	1st	Heighington Novices Chase Div.II	2m4f	Soft	T Carmody	1.5	Loch Owen	2/9f	Sedgefield	10	
19 December 1980	2nd	Merryman II Novice Chase	3m½f	Good	T Carmody	.5	Two Swallows	8/13f	Doncaster	15	
23 January 1981	1st	Stayers' Novices' Chase Div.II	3m1f	Good to Soft	T Carmody	.5	Midnight Love	2/5f	Catterick	10	
31 January 1981	1st	West of Scotland Novices' Chase	2m4f	Good to Soft	T Carmody	15	Royal Dipper	9/4	Ayr	8	
7 March 1981	UR	Timeform Chase	2m4f	Heavy	T Carmody	n/a	Little Owl	5/4	Haydock	4	
18 March 1981	9th	Sun Alliance Chase	3m	Heavy	T Carmody	dist	Lesley Ann	5/2	Cheltenham	17	
21 April 1981	1st	Welsh Champion Chase	2m4f	Firm	T Carmody	head	Master Davenport	30/100f	Chepstow	3	
31 October 1981	1st	Lambert & Butler Premier Chase (Qualifier)	2m4½f	Good to Firm	R Earnshaw	1.5	Princess Token	2/5f	Wetherby	9	
21 November 1981	1st	Tote Silver Trophy Chase (Limited Handicap)	2m4f	Good	R Earnshaw	5	Silversmith	9/4f	Ascot	8	
1 December 1981	1st	Peterborough Chase	2m4f	Good	R Earnshaw	dist	Snowtown Boy	1/2f	Huntingdon	4	
30 January 1982	3rd	Tote Double Chase	3m1f	Soft	R Earnshaw	dist	Lesley Ann	6/5f	Cheltenham	4	
24 February 1982	1st	Lambert & Butler Premier Chase Final	2m4f	Good	R Earnshaw	3	Earthstopper	13/8f	Ascot	7	
6 March 1982	1st	Timeform Chase	2m4f	Good to Soft	R Earnshaw	4	Bright Dream	2/5f	Haydock	4	
13 April 1982	1st	Welsh Champion Chase	2m4f	Good to Firm	R Earnshaw	4	Straight Jocelyn	5/6f	Chepstow	6	
30 October 1982	1st	Worcester Evening News Chase	2m4f	Good	R Earnshaw	12	Night Nurse	4/11f	Worcester	3	
13 November 1982	3rd	Mackeson Gold Cup Handicap Chase	2m4f	Good to Soft	R Earnshaw	7	Fifty Dollars More	9/4f	Cheltenham	11	
11 December 1982	2nd	Kennedy Construction Gold Cup Handicap Chase	2m4f	Heavy	R Earnshaw	1.5	Observe	5/2f	Cheltenham	15	
27 December 1982	1st	King George VI Chase	3m	Good to Soft	J Francome	2	Fifty Dollars More	7/2	Kempton	6	
17 March 1983	3rd	Cheltenham Gold Cup	3m2f	Soft	J J O'Neill	6.5	Bregawn	6/1	Cheltenham	11	
29 October 1983	1st	Charlie Hall Memorial Wetherby Pattern Chase	3m½f	Good to Firm	R Earnshaw	10	Ashley House	1/3f	Wetherby	3	
29 November 1983	1st	Peterborough Chase	2m4f	Firm	R Earnshaw	shd	Fifty Dollars More	4/11f	Huntingdon	4	
27 December 1983	1st	King George VI Chase	3m	Firm	R Earnshaw	5	Brown Chamberlain	11/8f	Kempton	5	
11 February 1984	2nd	Compton Chase	3m	Good	R Earnshaw	3	Brown Chamberlain	5/4	Newbury	2	
25 February 1984	1st	Pennine Chase	3m½f	Good to Firm	R Earnshaw	3	King Spruce	No SP	Doncaster	2	
15 March 1984	PU	Cheltenham Gold Cup	3m2f	Good	R Earnshaw	n/a	Burrough Hill Lad	6/4f	Cheltenham	12	
1 November 1984	1st	Terry Biddlecombe Challenge Trophy Chase	2m5f	Good	R Earnshaw	n/a	Romany Count	2/9f	Wincanton	3	
21 November 1984	1st	Edward Hanmer Memorial Chase (Limited Handicap)	3m	Good to Soft	R Earnshaw	2.5	A Kinsman	8/15f	Haydock	5	
8 December 1984	2nd	Charlie Hall Memorial Wetherby Pattern Chase	3m½f	Good	R Earnshaw	10	Burrough Hill Lad	10/11jf	Wetherby	4	
26 December 1984	3rd	King George VI Chase	3m	Good to Soft	R Earnshaw	dist	Burrough Hill Lad	5/2	Kempton	3	
9 February 1985	2nd	Mercedes-Benz Chase (Limited Handicap)	3m½f	Good	R Earnshaw	7	Earls Brig	9/4	Ayr	6	
14 March 1985	8th	Cheltenham Gold Cup	3m2f	Good	R Earnshaw	n/a	Forgive 'N Forget	8/1	Cheltenham	15	
28 March 1985	1st	Whitbread Gold Label Cup Chase	3m1f	Firm	J Francome	3	Earls Brig	6/1	Aintree	6	
2 November 1985	1st	Charlie Hall Memorial Wetherby Pattern Chase	3m½f	Firm	G Bradley	2.5	Allerlea	Evsf	Wetherby	4	
20 November 1985	UR	Edward Hanmer Memorial Chase (Limited Handicap)	3m	Good	G Bradley	n/a	Forgive 'N Forget	4/6f	Haydock	3	
30 November 1985	3rd	Rehearsal Chase	3m	Good to Soft	G Bradley	3	Burrough Hill Lad	7/4f	Chepstow	5	
11 December 1985	2nd	Tommy Whittle Chase	3m	Soft	G Bradley	.5	Earls Brig	5/1	Haydock	4	
26 December 1985	1st	King George VI Chase	3m	Heavy	G Bradley	nk	Combs Ditch	12/1	Kempton	5	
13 March 1986	2nd	Cheltenham Gold Cup	3m2f	Good to Firm	G Bradley	1	Dawn Run	8/1	Cheltenham	11	
3 April 1986	2nd	Whitbread Gold Label Cup Chase	3m1f	Good	G Bradley	1.5	Beau Ranger	13/8	Aintree	4	
1 November 1986	3rd	Charlie Hall Memorial Wetherby Pattern Chase	3m½f	Good	G Bradley	5.5	Forgive 'N Forget	6/5f	Wetherby	6	
29 November 1986	3rd	Rehearsal Chase	3m	Good to Soft	G Bradley	12	Cybrandian	11/8f	Chepstow	3	
13 December 1986	2nd	Sheila's Cottage Handicap Chase	3m2f	Good	G Bradley	1.5	Burnt Oak	6/4f	Doncaster	5	
26 December 1986	5th	King George VI Chase	3m	Soft	G Bradley	25	Desert Orchid	9/2	Kempton	9	
14 February 1987	4th	Elk Chase (Limited Handicap)	3m½f	Soft	T Dun	n/a	Peaty Sandy	7/4f	Ayr	5	
19 March 1987	5th	Cheltenham Gold Cup	3m2f	Good to Soft	G Bradley	6.6	The Thinker	11/1	Cheltenham	12	
2 April 1987	1st	Whitbread Gold Label Cup Chase	3m1f	Good	G McCourt	7	Simon Legree	7/1	Aintree	6	
