= Aintree Bowl =

Steeplechase horse race in Britain

Betway Bowl
- Class: Grade 1
- Location: Aintree Racecourse; Merseyside, England
- Inaugurated: 1984
- Race type: Steeplechase
- Sponsor: Betway
- Website: Aintree

Race information
- Distance: 3m 210y (5,020 metres)
- Surface: Turf
- Track: Left-handed
- Qualification: Five-years-old and up
- Weight: 11 st 7 lb Allowances; 7 lb for mares
- Purse: £250,000 (2022); 1st: £140,325

Betfred Bowl Chase
2026
Jango Baie	Protektorat	Pic D'Orhy

Previous years
2025
Gaelic Warrior	Grey Dawning	Stage Star
2024
Gerri Colombe	Ahoy Senor	Corbetts Cross
2023
Shishkin	Ahoy Senor	A Plus Tard
2022
Clan Des Obeaux	Conflated	Kemboy
2021
Clan Des Obeaux	Clondaw Castle	Native River

2020-2011
2019
Kemboy	Clan Des Obeaux	Balko Des Flos
2018
Might Bite	Bristol De Mai	Clan Des Obeaux
2017
Tea For Two	Cue Card	Smad Place
2016
Cue Card	Don Poli	Djakadam
2015
Silviniaco Conti	Ballynagour	Holywell
2014
Silviniaco Conti	Dynaste	Argocat
2013
First Lieutenant	Menorah	Silviniaco Conti
2012
Follow The Plan	Burton Port	Hunt Ball
2011
Nacarat	Carole's Legacy	Follow The Plan

2010-2001
2010
What A Friend	Carruthers	Nacarat
2009
Madison Du Berlais	Exotic Dancer	Albertas Run
2008
Our Vic	Kauto Star	Exotic Dancer
2007
Exotic Dancer	My Will	Our Vic
2006
Celestial Gold	Take The Stand	L'ami
2005
Grey Abbey	First Gold	Crystal d'Ainay
2004
Tiutchev	First Gold	Hand Inn Hand
2003
First Gold	Lady Cricket	Commanche Court
2002
Florida Pearl	Cyfor Malta	Lord Noelie
2001
First Gold	Lord Noelie	Legal Right

2000-1991
2000
See More Business	Mulligan	Lake Kariba
1999
Macgeorge	Escartefigue	Dr Leunt
1998
Escartefigue	Simply Dashing	The Grey Monk
1997
Barton Bank	Merry Gale	Rouyan
1996
Scotton Banks	Barton Bank	Unguided Missile
1995
Merry Gale	Martomick	Monsieur Le Cure
1994
Docklands Express	Black Humour	Dubacilla
1993
Docklands Express	Run For Free	Very Very Ordinary
1992
Kings Fountain	Tipping Tim	Sparkling Flame
1991
Aquilifer	Norton's Coin	Stay on Tracks

1990-1988
1990
Toby Tobias	Cavvies Clown	Man O'Magic
1989
Yahoo	Delius	Bishops Yarn
1988
Desert Orchid	Kildimo	Weather The Storm

The Alder Hey Aintree Bowl is a Grade 1 National Hunt steeplechase in Great Britain which is open to horses aged five years or older. It is run at Aintree over a distance of about 3 miles and 1 furlong (3 miles and 210 yards, or 5,020 metres), and during its running there are nineteen fences to be jumped. The race is scheduled to take place each year in early April.

== History ==
The event was established in 1984, and it was originally designed as a consolation prize for horses which were beaten or had been unable to participate in the previous month's Cheltenham Gold Cup. The inaugural running was backed by Perrier-Jouët, and it was titled the Perrier-Jouët Champagne Cup. For the following three years it was sponsored by Whitbread and called the Whitbread Gold Label Cup.

Subsequent sponsors have included Martell (the Martell Cup, the Martell Cognac Cup) and Betfair (the Betfair Bowl). Totesport began supporting the event as the Totesport Bowl in 2008 and the sponsorship was taken over by Betfred in 2012 after that company purchased The Tote in 2011. Betway took over sponsorship from the 2017 running. For the 2023 edition the race was run as the Alder Hey Aintree Bowl as part of the 21st anniversary of the partnership between Aintree Racecourse and the Alder Hey Children's Charity.

The race was promoted to Grade 1 status in 2010. It is currently held on the opening day of the three-day Grand National meeting.

== Records ==
Most successful horse (2 wins):

- Wayward Lad – 1985, 1987
- Docklands Express – 1993, 1994
- First Gold – 2001, 2003
- Silviniaco Conti – 2014, 2015
- Clan Des Obeaux – 2021, 2022

Leading jockey (2 wins):

- Richard Dunwoody – Aquilifer (1991), Docklands Express (1994)
- Thierry Doumen – First Gold (2001, 2003)
- Tony McCoy – Tiutchev (2004), Exotic Dancer (2007)
- Timmy Murphy – Celestial Gold (2006), Our Vic (2008)
- Noel Fehily – Silviniaco Conti (2014, 2015)
- Paddy Brennan – Nacarat (2011), Cue Card (2016)
- Ruby Walsh – What A Friend (2010), Kemboy (2019)
- Harry Cobden – Clan Des Obeaux (2021, 2022)
- Nico de Boinville – Might Bite (2018), Shishkin (2023)

Leading trainer (6 wins):

- Paul Nicholls – See More Business (2000), What a Friend (2010), Silviniaco Conti (2014, 2015), Clan Des Obeaux (2021, 2022)

== Winners ==
Year	Winner	Age	Jockey	Trainer
1984	Royal Bond	11	Tom Taaffe	Arthur Moore
1985	Wayward Lad	10	John Francome	Monica Dickinson
1986	Beau Ranger	8	Hywel Davies	John Thorne
1987	Wayward Lad	12	Graham McCourt	Monica Dickinson
1988	Desert Orchid	9	Simon Sherwood	David Elsworth
1989	Yahoo	8	Tom Morgan	John Edwards
1990	Toby Tobias	8	Mark Pitman	Jenny Pitman
1991	Aquilifer	11	Richard Dunwoody	Martin Pipe
1992	Kings Fountain	9	Anthony Tory	Kim Bailey
1993	Docklands Express	11	Jamie Osborne	Kim Bailey
1994	Docklands Express	12	Richard Dunwoody	Kim Bailey
1995	Merry Gale	7	Graham Bradley	Jim Dreaper
1996	Scotton Banks	7	Lorcan Wyer	Tim Easterby
1997	Barton Bank	11	David Walsh	David Nicholson
1998	Escartefigue	6	Richard Johnson	David Nicholson
1999	Macgeorge	9	Adrian Maguire	Richard Lee
2000	See More Business	10	Mick Fitzgerald	Paul Nicholls
2001	First Gold	8	Thierry Doumen	François Doumen
2002	Florida Pearl	10	Barry Geraghty	Willie Mullins
2003	First Gold	10	Thierry Doumen	François Doumen
2004	Tiutchev	11	Tony McCoy	Martin Pipe
2005	Grey Abbey	11	Graham Lee	Howard Johnson
2006	Celestial Gold	8	Timmy Murphy	Martin Pipe
2007	Exotic Dancer	7	Tony McCoy	Jonjo O'Neill
2008	Our Vic	10	Timmy Murphy	David Pipe
2009	Madison du Berlais	8	Tom Scudamore	David Pipe
2010	What A Friend	7	Ruby Walsh	Paul Nicholls
2011	Nacarat	10	Paddy Brennan	Tom George
2012	Follow The Plan	9	Tom Doyle	Oliver McKiernan
2013	First Lieutenant	8	Bryan Cooper	Mouse Morris
2014	Silviniaco Conti	8	Noel Fehily	Paul Nicholls
2015	Silviniaco Conti	9	Noel Fehily	Paul Nicholls
2016	Cue Card	10	Paddy Brennan	Colin Tizzard
2017	Tea For Two	8	Lizzie Kelly	Nick Williams
2018	Might Bite	9	Nico de Boinville	Nicky Henderson
2019	Kemboy	7	Ruby Walsh	Willie Mullins
	no race 2020 (Note: The 2020 running was cancelled because of the COVID-19 pandemic in the United Kingdom)
2021	Clan Des Obeaux	9	Harry Cobden	Paul Nicholls
2022	Clan Des Obeaux	10	Harry Cobden	Paul Nicholls
2023	Shishkin	9	Nico de Boinville	Nicky Henderson
2024	Gerri Colombe	8	Jack Kennedy	Gordon Elliott
2025	Gaelic Warrior	7	Patrick Mullins (Note: amateur jockey)	Willie Mullins
2026	Jango Baie	7	Nico de Boinville	Nicky Henderson

== See also ==
- Horse racing in Great Britain
- List of British National Hunt races
- Recurring sporting events established in 1984 – this race is included under its original title, Perrier-Jouët Champagne Cup.
