= Yahoo (horse) =

Irish-bred Thoroughbred racehorse

- Sire: Trombone
- Grandsire: Hornbeam
- Dam: Coolroe Aga
- Damsire: Laurence O.
- Sex: Gelding
- Foaled: 1981
- Country: Ireland
- Colour: Bay
- Breeder: T. Conway
- Owner: Alan Parker
- Trainer: John Edwards

Major wins
- Rowland Meyrick Chase (1987); Greenall Whitley Gold Cup (1988); Martell Cup (1989)

Yahoo (foaled 1981) was a National Hunt racehorse, who is best remembered for finishing second in the 1989 Cheltenham Gold Cup to Desert Orchid. Yahoo was successful on the amateur Point-to-Point circuit, winning at least eleven races. His biggest wins under National Hunt rules included the Rowland Meyrick Chase at Wetherby in 1987, and the Martell Cup at Aintree in 1989. His last race was a second-place at Worcester in May 1994.
