= Peter Marsh Chase =

Steeplechase horse race in Britain

Peter Marsh Chase
2026
Imperial Saint	Richmond Lake	Konfusion

Previous years
2025
Mr Vango	Iwilldoit	Richmond Lake
2022
Royale Pagaille	Sam Brown	Fortescue
2021
Royale Pagaille	Potters Legend	Just Your Type

2020-2011
2020
Vintage Clouds	Definitly Red	Geronimo
2019
Wakanda	Robinsfirth	Ballydine
2018
The Dutchman	Captain Redbeard	Hainan
2017
Bristol De Mai	Otago Trail	Bishops Road
2016
Cloudy Too	Virak	Fingal Bay
2015
Samstown	Benbens	Vintage Star
2014
Wychwoods Brook	Vintage Star	Merry King
2012
According To Pete	Pearlysteps	Consigliere

2010-2001
2010
Our Vic	Palypso De Creek	According To Pete
2009
Cloudy Lane	Glasker Mill	Opera Mundi
2007
The Outlier	Turpin Green	Truckers Tavern
2006
Ebony Light	Kingscliff	Truckers Tavern
2005
Lord Transcend	First Gold	Take The Stand
2004
Artic Jack	Kingscliff	You're Agoodun
2003
Truckers Tavern	Hussard Collonges	Goguenard
2002
Red Striker	Robbo	Banker Count

2000-1991
2000
The Last Fling	Bobby Grant	Tresor De Mai
1999
General Wolfe	Simply Dashing	Random Harvest
1998
General Wolfe	Strath Royal	Nahthen Lad
1997
Jodami	Unguided Missile	Avro Anson
1996
Scotton Banks	Smith's Band	Garrison Savannah
1995
Earth Summit	Chatam	Raymylette
1994
Zeta's Lad	Run For Free	Jodami
1993
Jodami	Run For Free	Gold Options
1992
Twin Oaks	Gold Options	Romany King

1990-1988
1990
Nick The Brief	Bishops Yarn	Yahoo
1989
Bishops Yarn	Cavvies Clown	Comeragh King

The Peter Marsh Chase is a Grade 2 National Hunt chase in Great Britain which is open to horses aged five years or older. It is run at Haydock Park over a distance of about 3 miles 1½ furlongs (3 miles 1 furlong and 125 yards, or 5,144 metres), and during its running there are nineteen fences to be jumped. It is a limited handicap race, and it is scheduled to take place each year in January. It was first run in 1981.

In April 2023 the British Horseracing Authority announced that the race would become a full weight-range Premier Handicap from the 2023/24 season.

== Records ==
Most successful horse (2 wins):

- Jodami – 1993,1997
- Royale Pagaille - 2021, 2022

Leading jockey (4 wins):

- Danny Cook – Our Vic (2010), Cloudy Too (2016), Wakanda (2019), Vintage Clouds (2020)

Leading trainer (5 wins):

- Sue Smith – The Last Fling (2000), Artic Jack (2004), Cloudy Too (2016), Wakanda (2019), Vintage Clouds (2020)

== Winners ==
- Weights given in stones and pounds.

Year	Winner	Age	Weight	Jockey	Trainer
1981	Little Owl	7	11-03	Jim Wilson (Note: amateur jockey)	Peter Easterby
1982	Bregawn	8	10-07	Robert Earnshaw	Michael Dickinson
1983	Ashley House	9	10-07	Robert Earnshaw	Michael Dickinson
1984	Abandoned due to frost
1985	Abandoned due to frost
1986	Combs Ditch	10	11-08	Colin Brown	David Elsworth
1987	The Thinker	9	11-10	Ridley Lamb	Arthur Stephenson
1988	Abandoned due to snow
1989	Bishops Yarn	10	10-12	Richard Guest	Toby Balding
1990	Nick the Brief	8	10-09	Martin Lynch	John Upson
1991	Abandoned due to frost
1992	Twin Oaks	12	11-10	Neale Doughty	Gordon W. Richards
1993	Jodami	8	11-02	Mark Dwyer	Peter Beaumont
1994	Zeta's Lad	11	10-10	Robbie Supple	John Upson
1995	Earth Summit	7	10-04	Tom Jenks	Nigel Twiston-Davies
1996	Scotton Banks	7	11-06	Russ Garritty	Peter Easterby
1997	Jodami	12	11-10	Norman Williamson	Peter Beaumont
1998	General Wolfe	9	10-10	Norman Williamson	Tim Forster
1999	General Wolfe	10	10-12	Norman Williamson	Venetia Williams
2000	The Last Fling	10	10-12	Seamus Durack	Sue Smith
2001	Abandoned due to frost
2002	Red Striker	8	11-01	Richard Guest	Norman Mason
2003	Truckers Tavern	8	10-09	Davy Russell	Ferdy Murphy
2004	Artic Jack	8	10-06	Dominic Elsworth	Sue Smith
2005	Lord Transcend	8	10-04	Graham Lee	Howard Johnson
2006	Ebony Light	10	09-13	Stephen Craine	Ginger McCain
2007	The Outlier	9	10-03	Paul O'Neill	Venetia Williams
2008	Abandoned due to waterlogging
2009	Cloudy Lane	9	11-10	Jason Maguire	Donald McCain, Jr.
2010	Our Vic	12	11-03	Danny Cook	David Pipe
2011	Abandoned due to frost
2012	According To Pete	11	11-02	Harry Haynes	Malcolm Jefferson
2013	Abandoned due to snow
2014	Wychwoods Brook	8	11-07	Conor Ring	Evan Williams
2015	Samstown	8	10-05	Brian Harding	Alistair Whillans
2016	Cloudy Too	10	10-04	Danny Cook	Sue Smith
2017	Bristol De Mai	6	11-02	Daryl Jacob	Nigel Twiston-Davies
2018	The Dutchman	8	10-06	Harry Cobden	Colin Tizzard
2019	Wakanda	10	10-10	Danny Cook	Sue Smith
2020	Vintage Clouds	10	10-11	Danny Cook	Sue Smith
2021	Royale Pagaille	7	11-10	Tom Scudamore	Venetia Williams
2022	Royale Pagaille	8	11-10	Charlie Deutsch	Venetia Williams
2023	Abandoned due to frost
2024	Abandoned due to frost
2025	Mr Vango	9	10-02	Jack Tudor	Sara Bradstock
2026	Imperial Saint	8	10-07	Callum Pritchard	Philip Hobbs & Johnson White

== See also ==
- Horse racing in Great Britain
- List of British National Hunt races

== Sources ==
- Racing Post:
  - 1989, 1990, 1992, 1993, 1994, 1995, 1996, 1997, 1998, 1999
  - 2000, 2002, 2003, 2004, 2005, 2006, 2007, 2009, 2010, 2012
  - 2014, 2015, 2016, 2017, 2018, 2019, 2020, 2021

- pedigreequery.com – Peter Marsh Handicap Chase – Haydock.
- Ladbrokes Pocket Companion 1990/91. Aesculus Press. 1990. p. 50. ISBN 1-871093-21-X.
