= Swinley Chase =

Steeplechase horse race in Britain

Swinley Chase
2026
Montregard	Gericault Roque	Your Darling

Previous years
2025
Victtorino	Threeunderthrufive	Terresita
2024
Threeunderthrufive	Rapper	Shan Blue
2023
Cap Du Nord	Neon Moon	Revels Hill
2022
Fortescue	Fiddlerontheroof	Truckers Lodge
2021
Captain Chaos	Regal Encore	Musical Slave

2020-2011
2020
Ballyoptic	Valtor	Regal Encore
2019
Calipto	Black Corton	Regal Encore
2018
Regal Encore	Minella Daddy	Another Venture
2017
Tenor Nivernais	Go Conquer	Sausalito Sunrise
2016
Sausalito Sunrise	Vieux Lion Rouge	Waldorf Salad
2015
Carole's Destrier	Clondaw Knight	Ballyoliver
2014
Restless Harry	Teaforthree	Houblon Des Obeaux
2013
Vino Griego	Cappa Bleu	Saint Are
2012
Massini's Maguire	Tullamore Dew	Cappa Bleu
2011
Iconoclast	The Sawyer	Royal Tune

The Swinley Chase is a National Hunt Premier Handicap handicap chase in England which is open to horses aged five years or older. It is run at Ascot over a distance of about 3 miles (2 miles, 7 furlongs and 180 yards, or 4,790 metres), and during its running there are twenty fences to be jumped. It is scheduled to take place each year in February.

The race was first run in 2011, but it is effectively a reincarnation of the Whitbread Trial Handicap Chase (later the Crispin Handicap), which was first run in 1966 and last run in 1994. It is currently sponsored by Keltbray and prior to 2017 it was sponsored by Weatherbys and Applebee's. The race held Listed status until 2022 and was re-classified as a Premier Handicap from the 2023 running when Listed status was removed from handicap races.

== Winners ==
Year	Winner	Age	Weight	Jockey	Trainer
1966	Highland Wedding	9	10–12	Owen McNally	Toby Balding
1967	No race				
1968	Regal John	10	10–11	Josh Gifford	Ryan Price
1969	Abandoned because of frost				
1970	French Tan	8	11-09	Pat Taaffe	A Watson (Ir)
1971	The Laird	10	11-10	Jeff King	Bob Turnell
1972	Prairie Dog	8	10-01	Barry Brogan	Fulke Walwyn
1973	Balinese	8	11-01	Andy Turnell	Bob Turnell
1974	Abandoned because of waterlogged state of course				
1975	Ten Up	8	11–06	Tommy Carberry	Jim Dreaper (Ir)
1976	April Seventh	10	11-07	Andy Turnell	Bob Turnell
1977	Ghost Writer	10	11-05	Bill Smith	Fulke Walwyn
1978	Abandoned because of frost				
1979	Abandoned because of snow				
1980	Master Spy	11	10–11	Tim Thomson Jones (Note: amateur jockey)	Tim Forster
1981	Aldaniti	11	11-07	Bob Champion	Josh Gifford
1982	Cavity Hunter	9	10-03	Robert Earnshaw	Michael Dickinson
1983	Abandoned because of frost				
1984	Tracys Special	7	10-05	Steve Knight	Andy Turnell
1985	Greenwood Lad	8	10-06	Richard Rowe	Josh Gifford
1986	Brunton Park	8	10-04	Graham Bradley	Monica Dickinson
1987	Castle Warden	10	09-12	Mark Richards	John Edwards
1988	Aquilifer	8	10-03	Paul Croucher	David Murray Smith
1989	Proud Pilgrim	10	10-09	Mark Dwyer	Jimmy FitzGerald
1990	Ten of Spades	10	10-00	Kevin Mooney	Fulke Walwyn
1992	Combermere	8	10-10	Peter Scudamore	Richard Frost
1993	Very Very Ordinary	7	11-03	Adrian Maguire	John Upson
1994	Dubacilla	8	12-00	Dean Gallagher	Henry Cole
1995–2010	No race				
2011	Iconoclast	10	10-04	Paul Moloney	A M Hales
2012	Massini's Maguire	11	10–13	Tom Scudamore	David Pipe
2013	Vino Griego	8	11-03	Jamie Moore	Gary Moore
2014	Restless Harry	10	10-07	Charlie Poste	Robert Dickin
2015	Carole's Destrier	7	11-00	Barry Geraghty	Neil Mulholland
2016	Sausalito Sunrise	8	11-10	Tom O'Brien	Philip Hobbs
2017	Tenor Nivernais	10	11-07	Liam Treadwell	Venetia Williams
2018	Regal Encore	10	11-05	Richie McLernon	Anthony Honeyball
2019	Calipto	9	10-08	Charlie Deutsch	Venetia Williams
2020	Ballyoptic	10	11-10	Sam Twiston-Davies	Nigel Twiston-Davies
2021	Captain Chaos	10	10-09	Harry Skelton	Dan Skelton
2022	Fortescue	8	10-07	Hugh Nugent	Henry Daly
2023	Cap Du Nord	10	10-08	Jack Tudor	Christian Williams
2024	Threeunderthrufive	9	12-00	Harry Cobden	Paul Nicholls
2025	Victtorino	7	11-07	Charlie Deutsch	Venetia Williams
2026	Montregard	7	10-02	Jonathan Burke	Tom Lacey

== See also ==
- Horse racing in Great Britain
- List of British National Hunt races

== Sources ==
- Racing Post
  - 1988, 1989, 1990, 1992, 1993, 1994
  - 2011, 2012, 2013, 2014, 2015, 2016, 2017, 2018, 2019, 2020
  - 2021, 2022, 2023
- Timeform Chasers & Hurdlers Statistical Companion 1992–93. Portway Press. 1993. p. 149.
