= Timeform Chase =

The Timeform Chase was a National Hunt Conditions chase in England. It was run at Haydock Park over a distance of 2 miles and 4 furlongs (4,828 metres), and it took place each year in February.

The race was first run in 1981 and was run for the last time in February 1996. The race was sponsored by Timeform until 1992, and in 1993 was run as the East Lancs Chase. The race was sponsored by Black Death Vodka in 1995 and 1996 who continued their sponsorship when it became an ordinary handicap in 1997.

== Winners ==
Year	Winner	Age	Jockey	Trainer
1981	Little Owl	7	Mr Jim Wilson	Peter Easterby
1982	Wayward Lad	7	Robert Earnshaw	Michael Dickinson
1983	Fifty Dollars More	8	Richard Linley	Fred Winter
1984	Forgive 'n Forget	7	Mark Dwyer	Jimmy FitzGerald
1985	Forgive 'n Forget	8	Mark Dwyer	Jimmy FitzGerald
1986	Abandoned because of frost
1987	Abandoned because of snow
1988	Raise An Argument	9	Jamie Osborne	Mrs Monica Dickinson
1989	Southern Minstrel	6	Alan Merrigan	Arthur Stephenson
1990	Tartan Takeover	8	Mark Dwyer	Gordon W. Richards
1991	Carrick Hill Lad	8	Neale Doughty	Gordon W. Richards
1992	Last 'o' The Bunch	8	Neale Doughty	Gordon W. Richards
1993	Gale Again	6	Kenny Johnson	Peter Cheesborough
1994	Abandoned due to frost and snow
1995	Sweet Duke	8	David Bridgwater	Nigel Twiston-Davies
1996	Morceli	8	Paul Carberry	J Howard Johnson
