= George Duller Pertemps Final =

Hurdle horse race in Britain

- Class: Premier Handicap
- Location: Cheltenham Racecourse; Cheltenham, England
- Inaugurated: 1974
- Race type: Hurdle race
- Sponsor: Pertemps
- Website: Cheltenham

Race information
- Distance: 2m 7f 213y (4,785 metres)
- Surface: Turf
- Track: Left-handed
- Qualification: Five-years-old and up
- Weight: Handicap
- Purse: £100,000 (2023); 1st: £56,270

George Duller Pertemps Final
2026
Supremely West	Lavida Adiva	Ikarak

Previous years
2025
Doddiethegreat	Jeriko Du Reponet	Catch Him Derry
2024
Monmiral	Kyntara	Cuthbert Dibble
2023
Good Time Jonny	Salvador Ziggy	Mill Green
2022
Third Wind	Alaphilippe	Mill Green
2021
Mrs Milner	The Bosses Oscar	Come On Teddy

2020-2011
2020
Sire Du Berlais	The Storyteller	Tout Est Permis
2019
Sire Du Berlais	Tobefair	Not Many Left
2018
Delta Work	Glenloe	Connetable
2017
Presenting Percy	Barney Dwan	Jury Duty
2016
Mall Dini	Arpege D'alene	If in Doubt
2015
Call The Cops	Unique De Cotte	The Tourard Man
2014
Fingal Bay	Southfield Theatre	Pineau De Re
2013
Holywell	Captain Sunshine	Jetson
2012
Cape Tribulation	Catch Me	Cantlow
2011
Buena Vista	Son Amix	Sivota

2010-2001
2010
Buena Vista	Prince Erik	Chamirey
2009
Kayf Aramis	Buena Vista	Pennek
2008
Ballyfitz	Miko de Beauchene	According To Pete
2007
Oscar Park	Material World	Adamant Approach
2006
Kadoun	Hordago	Oodachee
2005
Oulart	Mioche d'Estruval	Quick
2004
Creon	G V A Ireland	Alexanderthegreat
2003
Inching Closer	Royal Emperor	Tribal Venture
2002
Freetown	Surprising	Montreal

2000-1991
2000
Rubhahunish	Take Five	Font Romeu
1999
Generosa	Melody Maid	Galant Moss
1998
Unsinkable Boxer	Tompetoo	Spendid
1997
Pharanear	Yahmi	Danjing
1996
Great Easeby	Gillan Cove	Pharanear
1995
Miracle Man	Pragada	Betty's Boy
1994
Tindari	Dark Honey	Kilgariff
1993
Fissure Seal	Jakarrdi	Sendai
1992
My View	Pragada	The Widget Man
1991
Danny Connors	Kings Rank	Randolph Place

1990-1988
1990
Henry Mann	Maelkar	Direct
1989
Rogers Princess	Henry Mann	Ryde Again
1988
Pragada	Mynah Key	Ruby Flight

The George Duller Pertemps Network Final is a Premier Handicap National Hunt hurdle race in Great Britain which is open to horses aged five years or older. It is run on the New Course at Cheltenham over a distance of about 3 miles (2 miles 7 furlongs and 213 yards, or 4,785 metres), and during its running there are twelve hurdles to be jumped. It is a handicap race, and it is scheduled to take place each year during the Cheltenham Festival in March.

== History ==
The event was established in 1974, when it was introduced as a replacement for a previous race at the Festival, the George Duller Handicap Hurdle. It was originally sponsored by Coral, and for much of its early history it was titled the Coral Golden Hurdle Final. It has had various sponsors since 1993, and the latest of these, Pertemps, began supporting the race in 2002.

The Pertemps Network Final is served by a series of qualifier races which take place during the preceding five months. A horse has to be placed in the first four in a qualifier race to be eligible to run in the Final. In the 2023–24 season there are 14 qualifier races, all in Great Britain. In previous seasons qualifiers have included races in Ireland and France.

The race was raised from Listed to Grade Three status from 2018 and reclassified as a Premier Handicap from the 2023 running when Grade 3 status was renamed by the British Horseracing Authority.

== Records ==
Most successful horse (3 wins):

- Willie Wumpkins – 1979, 1980, 1981

Leading jockey (3 wins):

- Jim Wilson – Willie Wumpkins (1979, 1980, 1981)
- Davy Russell – Mall Dini (2016), Presenting Percy (2017), Delta Work (2018)
- Barry Geraghty – Inching Closer (2003), Sire Du Berlais (2019, 2020)

Leading trainer (4 wins):

- Jonjo O'Neill – Danny Connors (1991), Inching Closer (2003), Creon (2004), Holywell (2013)

== Winners ==
- Weights given in stones and pounds.

Year	Winner	Age	Weight	Jockey	Trainer
1974	Kastrup	7	10-03	Graham Thorner	David Barons
1975	Saffron Cake	6	10-07	Eddie Wright	Les Kennard
1976	Good Prospect	7	11-10	Richard Evans	John Edwards
1977	Outpoint	7	11-03	Pat O'Brien	Fred Winter
1978	Water Colour	9	10-01	Kevin Whyte	Martin Tate
1979	Willie Wumpkins	11	10-04	Jim Wilson (Note: amateur jockey)	Jane Pilkington
1980	Willie Wumpkins	12	10-07	Jim Wilson	Jane Pilkington
1981	Willie Wumpkins	13	10-08	Jim Wilson	Jane Pilkington
1982	Tall Order	8	10-02	Andrew Stringer	Louis Foster
1983	Forgive 'n Forget	6	11-06	Mark Dwyer	Jimmy FitzGerald
1984	Canio	7	10-09	John Francome	Ron Hodges
1985	Von Trappe	8	10-06	Richard Dunwoody	Michael Oliver
1986	Motivator	6	10-07	Graham McCourt	Mick Ryan
1987	Taberna Lord	6	11-05	Luke Harvey	Jim Wilson
1988	Pragada	5	11-00	Richard Rowe	Josh Gifford
1989	Rogers Princess	7	10-00	Shaun Keightley	Martin Tate
1990	Henry Mann	7	11-09	Tony Mulholland	Simon Christian
1991	Danny Connors	7	10–12	Mark Dwyer	Jonjo O'Neill
1992	My View	8	10-04	Jason Titley	Michael Purcell
1993	Fissure Seal	7	11-04	Charlie Swan	Harry de Bromhead
1994	Tindari	6	10-09	Paul Williams	Malcolm Jefferson
1995	Miracle Man	7	10–11	Peter Hobbs	Colin Weedon
1996	Great Easeby	6	10-01	Richard McGrath	Wilf Storey
1997	Pharanear	7	11-09	Robert Thornton	David Nicholson
1998	Unsinkable Boxer	9	10–12	Tony McCoy	Martin Pipe
1999	Generosa	6	10-01	Norman Williamson	John Hassett
2000	Rubhahunish	9	11-02	Carl Llewellyn	Nigel Twiston-Davies
	no race 2001 (Note: The 2001 running was cancelled because of a foot-and-mouth crisis)
2002	Freetown	6	11-02	Tony Dobbin	Len Lungo
2003	Inching Closer	6	11-02	Barry Geraghty	Jonjo O'Neill
2004	Creon	9	10-00	Timmy Murphy	Jonjo O'Neill
2005	Oulart	6	10-02	Paul Carberry	Dessie Hughes
2006	Kadoun	9	11-07	Tom Ryan	Michael O'Brien
2007	Oscar Park	8	10-09	Tom Doyle	David Arbuthnot
2008	Ballyfitz	8	10-08	Paddy Brennan	Nigel Twiston-Davies
2009	Kayf Aramis	7	10-05	Aidan Coleman	Venetia Williams
2010	Buena Vista	9	10-01	Hadden Frost	David Pipe
2011	Buena Vista	10	10-08	Conor O'Farrell	David Pipe
2012	Cape Tribulation	8	10–11	Denis O'Regan	Malcolm Jefferson
2013	Holywell	6	11-04	Richie McLernon	Jonjo O'Neill
2014	Fingal Bay	8	11–12	Richard Johnson	Philip Hobbs
2015	Call The Cops	6	10–12	Andrew Tinkler	Nicky Henderson
2016	Mall Dini	6	10–11	Davy Russell	Pat Kelly
2017	Presenting Percy	6	11-11	Davy Russell	Pat Kelly
2018	Delta Work	5	10-10	Davy Russell	Gordon Elliott
2019	Sire Du Berlais	7	11-09	Barry Geraghty	Gordon Elliott
2020	Sire Du Berlais	8	11-12	Barry Geraghty	Gordon Elliott
2021	Mrs Milner	6	10-09	Bryan Cooper	Paul Nolan
2022	Third Wind	8	11-10	Tom O'Brien	Hughie Morrison
2023	Good Time Jonny	8	11-04	Liam McKenna	Tony Martin
2024	Monmiral	7	10-12	Harry Cobden	Paul Nicholls
2025	Doddiethegreat	9	11–12	Brian Hughes	Nicky Henderson
2026	Supremely West	8	10–11	Harry Skelton	Dan Skelton

== See also ==
- Horse racing in Great Britain
- List of British National Hunt races
