= Rowland Meyrick Handicap Chase =

Steeplechase horse race in Britain

Rowland Meyrick Handicap Chase
2025
Konfusion	Marble Sands	Knappers Hill

Previous years
2024
Some Scope	Kinondo Kwetu	Good Boy Bobby
2023
Fontaine Collonges	Empire Steel	Only two finished
2022
Into Overdrive	Sounds Russian	Fanion D'estruval
2021
Good Boy Bobby	Lord Du Mesnil	Top Ville Ben

2020-2011
2020
Canelo	Snow Leopardess	Windsor Avenue
2019
Top Ville Ben	Didero Vallis	Lake View Lad
2018
Lake View Lad	Captain Chaos	Takingrisks
2017
Get On The Yager	Wakanda	Delusionofgrandeur
2016
Definitly Red	Wakanda	Blaklion
2014
Dolatulo	Cape Tribulation	Corrin Wood
2013
Cloudy Too	Tullamore Dew	Cape Tribulation
2012
Cape Tribulation	Mr Moonshine	Ballyoliver
2011
According To Pete	Helpston	Midnight Chase

2010-2001
2008
Nozic	Tidal Bay	Cloudy Lane
2007
Lothian Falcon	Leading Man	Flying Enterprise
2006
Leading Man	Sir Rembrandt	Truckers Tavern
2005
Therealbandit	Take The Stand	My Will
2004
Truckers Tavern	Malek	Cruise Leader
2003
Gunner Welburn	Skippers Cleuch	Artic Jack
2001
Behrajan	Heidi	Birkdale

2000-1991
1998
Random Harvest	The Last Fling	River Lossie
1997
Strath Royal	Major Bell	Sparky Gayle
1994
Cogent	Jodami	Only two finished
1993
General Pershing	Mr Boston	Another Coral
1991
Stay On Tracks	Kings Fountain	Kildimo

1990-1987
1990
Bluff Knoll	Stay On Tracks	The Thinker
1989
Durham Edition	Nick The Brief	Ballyhane
1988
Whats What	Bucko	Oregon Trail
1987
Yahoo	The Langholm Dyer	Only two finished

The Rowland Meyrick Handicap Chase is a Premier Handicap National Hunt steeplechase in Great Britain which is open to horses aged four years or older. It is run at Wetherby over a distance of about 3 miles (3 miles and 45 yards or 4,869 metres), and during its running there are nineteen fences to be jumped. It is a handicap race, and it is scheduled to take place each year on Boxing Day.

The event is named in honour of Rowland Meyrick, who was appointed Clerk of the course at Wetherby in 1920. At this time Meyrick was also a member of the Wetherby Race Company, an organisation which was formed to purchase the lease of the racecourse. The Rowland Meyrick Handicap Chase held Grade 3 status from 2005, though it arguably reached its peak in the 1980s when Forgive 'n Forget and The Thinker both won it in the same season they would win the Cheltenham Gold Cup. The race was re-classified as a Premier Handicap from the 2022 running when Grade 3 status was renamed by the British Horseracing Authority.

== Winners ==
- Weights given in stones and pounds.

Year	Winner	Age	Weight	Jockey	Trainer
1957	Symaethis Nephew	7	10-00	Jumbo Wilkinson	Bobby Renton
1958	Dondrosa	6	10-09	Tommy Kellett	F Taylor
1959	Pendle Lady	9	10-06	Maurice Towers	Alf Watson
1960	Merryman II	9	12-06	Gerry Scott	Neville Crump
1961	Abandoned due to frost
1962	Abandoned due to frost
1963	Abandoned due to frost
1964	Abandoned due to frost
1965	Abandoned due to frost
1966	Tudor Fort	6	10-04	Pat Buckley	Neville Crump
1967	Abandoned because of foot and mouth epidemic
1968	Chancer	6	09-13	Paddy Vaughan	Charlie Hall
1969	Chesapeake Bay	6	10–13	Pat Buckley	Neville Crump
1970	Excess	8	10-09	Stan Mellor	Harry Thomson Jones
1971	Great Noise	7	09-07	David Taylor	Charlie Hall
1972	Jomon	6	11-06	Tommy Stack	Harry Thomson Jones
1973	Tartan Ace	6	10-05	Tommy Stack	Arthur Stephenson
1974	Glen Owen	7	10-02	Pat Buckley	Neville Crump
1975	The Gent	7	10-09	Tommy Stack	Arthur Stephenson
1976	Irish Tony	8	10-09	Dennis Atkins	Neville Crump
1977	Set Point	9	11-05	David Munro	Lady Herries
1978	Rambling Artist	8	10–11	David Goulding	A Gillam
1979	Ballet Lord	8	11-10	Colin Hawkins	Neville Crump
1980	Sunset Cristo	6	10–11	Chris Grant	Ray Hawkey
1981	Abandoned due to frost and snow
1982	Richdee	6	10-06	Colin Hawkins	Neville Crump
1983	Phil the Fluter	8	10-00	Shaun Keightley	H. Wharton
1984	Forgive 'n Forget	7	11-07	Mark Dwyer	Jimmy FitzGerald
1985	Fortina's Express	8	11-01	R. Hawkins	Arthur Stephenson
1986	The Thinker	8	11-06	Richard Dunwoody	Arthur Stephenson
1987	Yahoo	7	10-04	Tom Morgan	John Edwards
1988	Whats What	9	10-01	Peter Niven	Brian Bousfield
1989	Durham Edition	11	10-06	Alan Merrigan	Arthur Stephenson
1990	Bluff Knoll	7	10-00	Geoff Harker	Bobby Brewis
1991	Stay on Tracks	9	10-00	Chris Grant	Arthur Stephenson
1992	Abandoned due to frost
1993	General Pershing	7	10–13	Neale Doughty	Gordon W. Richards
1994	Cogent	10	10-08	Chris Bonner (Note: amateur jockey)	Jeremy Glover
1995	Abandoned due to frost
1996	Abandoned due to frost
1997	Strath Royal	11	10-10	Martin Brennan	Owen Brennan
1998	Random Harvest	9	09-11	Alan Dempsey	Mary Reveley
1999	Abandoned due to frost
2000	Abandoned due to frost
2001	Behrajan	6	11-10	Mark Bradburne	Henry Daly
2002	Abandoned due to waterlogging
2003	Gunner Welburn	11	10-00	Richard McGrath	Andrew Balding
2004	Truckers Tavern	9	11-02	Keith Mercer	Ferdy Murphy
2005	Therealbandit	8	09-10	Andrew Glassonbury	Martin Pipe
2006	Leading Man	6	10-00	Graham Lee	Ferdy Murphy
2007	Lothian Falcon	8	10-07	Robert Walford	Peter Maddison
2008	Nozic	7	10-08	Harry Skelton	Paul Nicholls
2009	Abandoned due to snow
2010	Abandoned due to frost
2011	According to Pete	10	09-11	Harry Haynes	Malcolm Jefferson
2012	Cape Tribulation	8	11-10	Jack Doyle	Malcolm Jefferson
2013	Cloudy Too	7	11-00	Jonathan England	Sue Smith
2014	Dolatulo	7	11-04	Dougie Costello	Warren Greatrex
2015	Abandoned due to waterlogging
2016	Definitly Red	7	11-00	Henry Brooke	Brian Ellison
2017	Get On The Yager	7	10-07	Henry Brooke	Dan Skelton
2018	Lake View Lad	8	11-10	Henry Brooke	Nick Alexander
2019	Top Ville Ben	7	11-11	Thomas Dowson	Philip Kirby
2020	Canelo	7	11-06	Tom Bellamy	Alan King
2021	Good Boy Bobby	8	11-08	Sam Twiston-Davies	Nigel Twiston-Davies
2022	Into Overdrive	7	10-11	Jamie Hamilton	Mark Walford
2023	Fontaine Collonges	8	10-03	Shane Quinlan	Venetia Williams
2024	Some Scope	6	09-09	Charlie Maggs	Richard Hobson
2025	Konfusion	7	11-02	Callum Bewley	Joel Parkinson & Sue Smith

== See also ==
- Horse racing in Great Britain
- List of British National Hunt races
