= Tommy Whittle Chase =

Steeplechase horse race in Britain

Tommy Whittle Chase
2021
Enqarde	Remastered	Calipso Collonges

Previous years
2020
Sam's Adventure	Sojourn	Salty Boy
2019
Lord Du Mesnil	Calipso Collonges	Vintage Clouds
2018
Daklondike	Ballyarthur	Whoshotwho
2017
Captain Redbeard	Catamaran Du Seuil	Lake View Lad
2016
Yala Enki	Vieux Lille	Kayfleur
2015
Seventh Sky	Spookydooky	Cloudy Too
2014
Broadway Buffalo	Toby Lerone	Fill The Power
2013
Night Alliance	Loch Ba	No Planning
2012
Cannington Brook	Merry King	Mac Aeda
2011
Cannington Brook	Our Island	Court Red Handed

2010-2001
2008
Malko De Beaumont	Atouchbetweenacara	Can'T Buy Time
2007
Cloudy Lane	Comply Or Die	High Chimes
2006
Kandjar D'allier	Wild Cane Ridge	Gallant Approach
2005
Captain Corelli	Lord Transcend	Malek
2004
Chives	Sir Rembrandt	Pizarro
2003
Keen Leader	Truckers Tavern	Hussard Collonges
2002
Sackville	Bobby Grant	Kingsmark
2001
Legal Right	Kingsmark	Bindaree

2000-1991
2000
Bobby Grant	King's Road	Earthmover
1999
Bobby Grant	The Last Fling	Storm Damage
1998
Suny Bay	Earth Summit	The Grey Monk
1997
The Grey Monk	Rough Quest	Coulton
1995
One Man	Monsieur Le Cure	Garrison Savannah
1994
Chatam	Black Humour	Only two finished
1993
Gambling Royal	Plenty Crack	Very Very Ordinary
1992
Twin Oaks	Pat's Jester	Espy

1990-1988
1990
Celtic Shot	Garrison Savannah	Nick The Brief
1989
Baies	The Thinker	Rinus
1988
The Thinker	Kissane	Canon Class

The Tommy Whittle Chase is a National Hunt handicap steeplechase in England which is open to horses aged four years or older. It is run at Haydock Park over a distance of about 2 miles and 7 furlongs (2 miles 6 furlongs and 204 yards, or 4,612 metres) and during its running there are 18 fences to be jumped. It is scheduled to take place each year in December.

The race was first run in 1982, and is named in honour of the late Tommy Whittle, a director of Haydock Park for 30 years, 13 of which were spent as chairman.

In 2004 the race had Grade 2 status and was considered sufficiently important to be included in the British Horseracing Board's new Order of Merit series. However, the following year it was turned into a handicap, and as a result has since attracted a lower grade of runners.

== Winners ==
Year	Winner	Age	Weight	Jockey	Trainer
1982	Little Owl	8	11-02	Jim Wilson (Note: amateur jockey)	Peter Easterby
1983	Prince Rowan	7	10–12	Dermot Browne	Michael Dickinson
1984	Gaye Chance	9	10–12	Sam Morshead	Mercy Rimell
1985	Earls Brig	10	10–12	Phil Tuck	W Hamilton
1986	Forgive 'n Forget	9	11-02	Mark Dwyer	Jimmy FitzGerald
1987	Abandoned because of frost
1988	The Thinker	10	11-02	Alan Merrigan	Arthur Stephenson
1989	Baies	7	10–12	Peter Scudamore	Charlie Brooks
1990	Celtic Shot	8	11-02	Graham McCourt	Charlie Brooks
1991	Abandoned because of frost
1992	Twin Oaks	12	11-02	Richard Dunwoody	Gordon W. Richards
1993	Gambling Royal	10	10–12	Adrian Maguire	David Nicholson
1994	Chatam	10	10-05	Richard Dunwoody	Martin Pipe
1995	One Man	7	10-05	Mark Dwyer	Gordon W. Richards
1996	Abandoned because of frost
1997	The Grey Monk	9	11-02	Peter Niven	Gordon W. Richards
1998	Suny Bay	9	10–12	Graham Bradley	Simon Sherwood
1999	Bobby Grant	8	11-03	Robbie Supple	Peter Beaumont
2000	Bobby Grant	9	11-08	Russ Garritty	Peter Beaumont
2001	Legal Right	8	11-02	Tony McCoy	Jonjo O'Neill
2002	Sackville	9	11-08	Timmy Murphy	Frances Crowley
2003	Keen Leader	7	11-05	Barry Geraghty	Jonjo O'Neill
2004	Chives	9	11-00	Dominic Elsworth	Sue Smith
2005	Captain Corelli	8	10-02	Tom O'Brien	Philip Hobbs
2006	Kandjar D'allier	8	11-04	Wayne Hutchinson	Alan King
2007	Cloudy Lane	7	11-03	Jason Maguire	Donald McCain
2008	Malko De Beaumont	8	10-02	Mark Bradburne	Alan Brown
2009	Abandoned because of frost
2010	Abandoned because of snow
2011	Cannington Brook	7	10-09	Tom O'Brien	Colin Tizzard
2012	Cannington Brook	8	11–12	Tom O'Brien	Colin Tizzard
2013	Night Alliance	8	11-00	Leighton Aspell	Dr Richard Newland
2014	Broadway Buffalo	6	10–11	Conor O'Farrell	David Pipe
2015	Seventh Sky	8	11–12	Gavin Sheehan	Charlie Mann
2016	Yala Enki	6	11-07	Charlie Deutsch	Venetia Williams
2017	Captain Redbeard	8	10-12	Sam Coltherd	Stuart Coltherd
2018	Daklondike	6	11-09	Tom Scudamore	David Pipe
2019	Lord Du Mesnil	6	10-05	Paul O'Brien	Richard Hobson
2020	Sam's Adventure	8	11-04	Brian Hughes	Brian Ellison
2021	Enqarde	7	10-09	Charlie Hammond	Dr Richard Newland
2022	Abandoned because of frost
2023	Famous Bridge	7	11-09	Sean Quinlan	Nicky Richards
2024	Egbert	7	11-04	Gavin Sheehan	Alan King
2025	Grand Geste	6	10-02	Danny McMenamin	Joel Parkinson & Sue Smith

== See also ==
- Horse racing in Great Britain
- List of British National Hunt races
