= McGeorge =

McGeorge is both a surname and a given name. McGeorge are a branch of the MacFheorais family which moved from Ireland to Galloway, and which in itself was part of the De Birmingham family. Notable people with this name include:

Surname:

- Alexander Crow McGeorge (1868–1953) — New Zealand engineer and businessman
- Jack McGeorge (1949–2009), — American Marine and Secret Service agent
- Jerry McGeorge (born 1945) — American musician
- Lee McGeorge Durrell (born 1949) — American naturalist
- Missie McGeorge (born 1959) — American golfer
- Rich McGeorge (born 1948) — American footballer
- Nick McGeorge (born 1966) — England Cricketer

Given name:

- McGeorge Bundy (1919–1996) — American national security advisor

== See also ==
- MacGeorge or Macgeorge a similar surname
- McGeorge School of Law, law school in Sacramento, California
