= Montagu Mares' Hurdle =

Hurdle horse race in Britain

- Class: Listed
- Location: Wetherby Racecourse; Wetherby, England
- Race type: Hurdle race
- Sponsor: Bet365
- Website: Wetherby

Race information
- Distance: 2 miles (3,219 metres)
- Surface: Turf
- Track: Left-handed
- Qualification: Four-years-old and up fillies & mares
- Weight: 11 st 0 lb Penalties for wins 6 lb for Grade 1 or Grade 2 hurdle * 4 lb for Listed or Premier Hcap hurdle * * since 30 Sep last year
- Purse: £30,000 (2025); 1st: £17,085

Montagu Mares' Hurdle
2026
Kateira	La Conquiere	Ooh Betty

Previous years
2025
Kateira	Golden Ace	Only two ran

Previous years
2024
Take No Chances	Royal Eagle	Carrigeen Kampala
2024
Take No Chances	Royal Eagle	Carrigeen Kampala
2023
You Wear It Well	Luccia	Kateira
2022
Molly Ollys Wishes	Martello Sky	See The Sea
2021
Molly Ollys Wishes	Miranda	Marie's Rock

2020-2011
2020
Mrs Hyde	Verdana Blue	Midnights' Gift
2019
Lady Buttons	Indefatigable	Vision Du Puy
2018
Lady Buttons	Mystic Sky	Irish Roe
2017
La Bague Au Roi	Lady Buttons	Late Night Lily
2016
Stephanie Frances	Midnight Jazz	Miss Crick
2015
Blue Buttons	Intense Tango	Midnight Jazz
2014
Aurore D'estruval	Emily Gray	Bonne Fee
2013
Cockney Sparrow	Prima Porta	Alasi
2012
Une Artiste	Alasi	She Ranks Me
2011
Alasi	Whoops A Daisy	Dance For Julie

2010-2007
2010
Alegralil	Issaquah	Amber Brook
2009
Santia	Lady Hillingdon	Quivvy Bridge
2008
My Petra	Blaeberry	Theatre Belle
2007
Annie's Answer	Gaspara	Cream Cracker

The Montagu Mares' Hurdle is a Listed National Hunt horse race in Great Britain which is open to mares aged four years or older. It is run at Wetherby over a distance of about 2 miles (3,219 metres), and during its running there are nine hurdles to be jumped. The race is scheduled to take place each year in late October or early November.

It was first run in 2007 over 2 miles as the Daniel Gath Homes Mares Only Hurdle Race and was won by Annie's Answer. In 2008 the race distance was increased by half a furlong due to track reconfiguration at Wetherby Racecourse and bet365 took over the sponsorship of the race between 2008 and 2011.

From 2012 to 2018 OLBG were the race sponsors. It returned to the 2 miles distance from 2015. Bet365 resumed sponsorship from the 2019 running and the race is now known as the bet365 Montagu Mares' Hurdle. The name Montagu was added in 2026 in honour of Captain Andrew Montagu, who owned the land the racecourse sits on when the course opened in 1891.

== Winners ==
Year	Winner	Age	Jockey	Trainer
2007	Annie's Answer	7	Tony Dobbin	Mrs V Makin
2008	My Petra	5	Richard Johnson	Nicky Henderson
2009	Santia	6	Robert Thornton	Alan King
2010	Alegralil	5	Graham Lee	Donald McCain
2011	Alasi	7	Dominic Elsworth	Paul Webber
2012	Une Artiste	4	Jeremiah McGrath	Nicky Henderson
2013	Cockney Sparrow	4	Dougie Costello	John Quinn
2014	Aurore D'estruval	4	Tony McCoy	John Quinn
2015	Blue Buttons	7	Noel Fehily	Harry Fry
2016	Stephanie Frances	8	Bridget Andrews	Dan Skelton
2017	La Bague au Roi	6	Richard Johnson	Warren Greatrex
2018	Lady Buttons	8	Adam Nicol	Philip Kirby
2019	Lady Buttons	9	Adam Nicol	Philip Kirby
2020	Mrs Hyde	7	Daryl Jacob	Brian Ellison
2021	Molly Ollys Wishes	7	Harry Skelton	Dan Skelton
2022	Molly Ollys Wishes	8	Harry Skelton	Dan Skelton
2023	You Wear It Well	6	Gavin Sheehan	Jamie Snowden
2024	Take No Chances	6	Harry Skelton	Dan Skelton
2025	Kateira	8	Harry Skelton	Dan Skelton
2026	Kateira	9	Harry Skelton	Dan Skelton

== See also ==
- Horse racing in Great Britain
- List of British National Hunt races
