= Greenall Whitley Gold Cup =

National Hunt Listed handicap chase in England

The Greenall Whitley Gold Cup was a National Hunt Listed handicap chase in England. It was run at Haydock Park over a distance of 3 miles (4,828 metres), and it was scheduled to take place each year in February or early March.

The event was established in 1968 and was last run in February 1990. In 1991 the distance was increased to 3 miles and 4 furlongs and although it initially kept the Greenalls name it was effectively the Grand National Trial, a race that had not been run since 1984.

== Winners ==
- Weights given in stones and pounds.

Year	Winner	Age	Weight	Jockey	Trainer
1968	Half Awake	8	10-13	Tommy Stack	D Thomson
1969	Two Springs	7	10-4	R Edwards	G Owen
1970	Abandoned because of snow and frost
1971	Rainbow Valley	8	10-13	Michael Dickinson	Tony Dickinson
1972	Young Ash Leaf	8	11-08	Tommy Stack	Ken Oliver
1973	Tregarron	6	10-06	Colin Tinkler	Ken Oliver
1974	Glanford Brigg	8	10-07	S Holland	J Hardy
1975	The Benign Bishop	8	11-08	Ron Barry	Ken Oliver
1976	Royal Frolic	7	10-12	Mr Sam Morshead	Fred Rimell
1977	General Moselle	8	10-03	Ian Watkinson	H Wharton
1978	Rambling Artist	8	10-06	Jonjo O'Neill	T Gillam
1979	Alverton	9	11-05	Jonjo O'Neill	Peter Easterby
1980	Cavity Hunter	7	11-01	Ridley Lamb	Tony Dickinson
1981	Sunset Cristo	7	11-07	Chris Grant	Ray Hawkey
1982	Scot Lane	9	10-00	Craig Smith	Martin Tate
1983	Righthand Man	6	10-09	Robert Earnshaw	Michael Dickinson
1984	Midnight Love	9	10-03	Chris Grant	Denys Smith
1985	Earls Brig	10	10-06	Phil Tuck	William Hamilton
1986	Abandoned due to frost
1987	Abandoned due to snow
1988	Yahoo	7	10-10	Tom Morgan	John Edwards
1989	Eton Rouge	10	10-01	J. Bryan	Mercy Rimell
1990	Rinus	9	10-04	Richard Dunwoody	Gordon W. Richards
