= MacGeorge =

MacGeorge or Macgeorge is a surname. McGeorge are a branch of the MacFheorais family which moved from Ireland to Galloway, and which in itself was part of the De Birmingham family. Notable people with the surname include:

- Ebenezer Farie Macgeorge (born ca.1827), surveyor and astronomer in Victoria, Australia, son of R. F. Macgeorge
- James Macgeorge (1832-1918), architect in South Australia, son of R. F. Macgeorge
- Jim MacGeorge (1928-2021), American voice actor.
- Norman Macgeorge (1872–1952), artist and critic in Victoria, Australia, grandson of R. F. Macgeorge
- Robert MacGeorge (1808-1884), Anglican priest in Scotland in the 19th century
- Robert Forsyth Macgeorge (1796-1859), Scottish tailor and businessman in South Australia
- William Stewart MacGeorge (1861–1931), a Scottish artist

== See also ==
McGeorge a similar surname
