= Dawn Run =

Irish-bred Thoroughbred racehorse (1978–1986)

- Racing silks of Charmian Hill
- Sire: Deep Run
- Grandsire: Pampered King
- Dam: Twilight Slave
- Damsire: Artic Slave
- Sex: Mare
- Foaled: 1978
- Country: Ireland
- Colour: Bay
- Breeder: John Riordan
- Owner: Charmian Hill
- Trainer: Paddy Mullins
- Record: 35: 21-

Major wins
- Ascot Hurdle (1983); Christmas Hurdle (1983); Irish Champion Hurdle (1984); Champion Hurdle (1984); Aintree Hurdle (1984); French Champion Hurdle (1984); Durkan Brothers Chase (1985); Cheltenham Gold Cup (1986); Timeform rating: 173

Honours
- Dawn Run Mares Novice Chase at Limerick Racecourse; Dawn Run Mares' Novices' Hurdle at Cheltenham Racecourse
- Last updated on 19 June 2024

Dawn Run (1978–1986) was an Irish Thoroughbred racehorse and the most successful mare in the history of National Hunt racing. She won the Champion Hurdle at the Cheltenham Festival in 1984 and the Cheltenham Gold Cup over fences at the festival in 1986. Dawn Run was the only racehorse ever to complete the Champion Hurdle-Gold Cup double. She was only the second mare to win the Champion Hurdle (and one of only eight to win it in total) and one of only four who have won the Cheltenham Gold Cup. She was the only horse ever to complete the English, Irish and French Champion Hurdle treble. With a Timeform rating of 173, she is the highest-ranked mare ever to appear over jumps.

== Background ==
A daughter of the highly successful National Hunt sire Deep Run, Dawn Run was bought for 5,800 guineas and trained by Paddy Mullins in Ireland.

== Racing career ==
=== Flat and Hurdle races ===
She started her career at the age of four, running in flat races at provincial courses. She was ridden in her first three races by her 62-year-old owner, Charmian Hill. After completing a hat-trick of wins on the flat, she set out on her hurdling career and progressed through the ranks to become champion novice hurdler in Britain and Ireland.

In her second season, she won eight of her nine races, including the English Champion Hurdle at Cheltenham, the Irish Champion Hurdle at Leopardstown, both over two miles, and the French Champion Hurdle (Grande Course de Haies d'Auteuil) at Auteuil over three miles, becoming the first horse to complete the treble. Her other big victories that season included the Christmas Hurdle (2 miles) at Kempton, in which she beat the reigning Champion Hurdler Gaye Brief by a neck after a duel up the home stretch, the Sandemans Hurdle at Aintree Racecourse (2 miles 5½ furlongs), which she won in a canter by fifteen lengths, and the Prix La Barka at Auteuil.

=== Steeplechases ===
She turned to steeplechasing but was injured after winning her first race and was out of action for the rest of the season. She made a successful return in December 1985 by winning the Durkan Brothers Chase at Punchestown by eight lengths. She followed up by beating the subsequent two-mile champion chaser Buck House over two and a half miles at Leopardstown later the same month despite making a bad mistake at the last fence. She was a hot favourite to win that season's Cheltenham Gold Cup, despite the fact that no horse had ever completed the Champion Hurdle and Gold Cup double, that she was still virtually a novice over fences and that the three and a quarter mile trip of the Gold Cup over the stiff Cheltenham course was further than she had ever run before. In January 1986, she was given a prep race at Cheltenham which she was expected to win easily. Her usual jockey, Tony Mullins, the son of the trainer, was on board. As usual, she set out to make all the running but her inexperience showed as she made a mistake on the back straight and unshipped her jockey. Mullins got back up on board and finished the course, last of the four runners. It was an unsatisfactory preparation for the Cheltenham Gold Cup, but it was decided to let her take her chance.

Controversially, and against the wishes of the trainer, Tony Mullins was replaced for the race by top jockey Jonjo O'Neill. He set the hot favourite out in front to make the running, but she was harried throughout the first circuit by Run and Skip. Unsettled by the attention, Dawn Run made a bad mistake at the water jump and lost two lengths. She won back the lead at the next fence but made another bad mistake at the last ditch. At this stage, there were only four horses in contention: Dawn Run, Run and Skip, the previous year's Gold Cup winner Forgive 'n Forget, and Wayward Lad, who had won the King George VI Chase three times. As Dawn Run led the field into the straight with just two fences and the uphill finish ahead of them, Wayward Lad and Forgive 'n Forget swept past the mare. O'Neill drove her up to the second last and landed in front. Wayward Lad regained the lead coming to the last fence, pressed by Forgive 'n Forget with Dawn Run struggling in third. About a hundred yards out, Wayward Lad began to hang to the left as his stamina started to give out. O'Neill switched Dawn Run to the outside and they raced past Forgive 'n Forget and cut into Wayward Lad's lead. Yards from the finish, they caught him and passed the gelding three-quarters of a length ahead in record time. A huge crowd invaded the winners' enclosure to join in the celebrations.

In her next race at Aintree, Dawn Run failed to get past the first fence, but followed up by again beating Buck House in a specially arranged match over two miles at the Punchestown Festival. The decision was then made by her owner to send her back to France to try to repeat her 1984 win in the Grande Course de Haies d'Auteuil (French Champion Hurdle), with French jockey Michel Chirol on board. She fell while going well at a hurdle on the back straight and, having broken her neck, never got up. The horse's death at age eight, while barely into her prime as a steeplechaser, was mourned by the racing public, including being reported on the front page of the following day's Irish Times. Her statue adorns the parade ring at Cheltenham, opposite that of Arkle.

== Pedigree ==
Pedigree of Dawn Run
Sire Deep Run ch. 1966	Pampered King b. 1954	Prince Chevalier b. 1943	Prince Rose
Sire Deep Run ch. 1966	Pampered King b. 1954	Prince Chevalier b. 1943	Chevalerie
Sire Deep Run ch. 1966	Pampered King b. 1954	Netherton Maid b. 1944	Nearco
Sire Deep Run ch. 1966	Pampered King b. 1954	Netherton Maid b. 1944	Phase
Sire Deep Run ch. 1966	Trial By Fire ch. 1958	Court Martial ch. 1942	Fair Trial
Sire Deep Run ch. 1966	Trial By Fire ch. 1958	Court Martial ch. 1942	Instantaneous
Sire Deep Run ch. 1966	Trial By Fire ch. 1958	Mitrailleuse b. 1944	Mieuxce
Sire Deep Run ch. 1966	Trial By Fire ch. 1958	Mitrailleuse b. 1944	French Kin
Dam Twilight Slave b. 1962	Arctic Slave b. 1950	Arctic Star br. 1942	Nearco
Dam Twilight Slave b. 1962	Arctic Slave b. 1950	Arctic Star br. 1942	Serena
Dam Twilight Slave b. 1962	Arctic Slave b. 1950	Roman Galley br. 1931	Man O' War
Dam Twilight Slave b. 1962	Arctic Slave b. 1950	Roman Galley br. 1931	Messaline
Dam Twilight Slave b. 1962	Early Light; 1953	Fortina ch. 1941	Formor
Dam Twilight Slave b. 1962	Early Light; 1953	Fortina ch. 1941	Bertina
Dam Twilight Slave b. 1962	Early Light; 1953	Broken Dawn; 1943	Bimco
Dam Twilight Slave b. 1962	Early Light; 1953	Broken Dawn; 1943	Black And White

== See also ==
- List of racehorses
