= Tom O'Brien (jockey) =

Irish jockey (1986–2026)

- O'Brien wins on Silk Affair at the 2009 Cheltenham Festival

Personal information
- Born: 28 November 1986 Wexford, County Wexford, Ireland
- Died: 11 November 2026 (aged 39)
- Occupations: Jockey, BHA steward

Horse racing career
- Sport: Horse racing

Tom O'Brien (28 November 1986 – 11 November 2026) was a British-based Irish jockey who competed in National Hunt racing.

== Career ==
O'Brien was born in Wexford on 28 November 1986. He began his career in racing by riding out for his uncle Shay Slevin, before starting to ride out for another uncle, Aidan O'Brien. He rode champion horses such as High Chaparral and Rock of Gibraltar. After riding in point-to-points, O'Brien moved to England in 2004 to work at the stable of Philip Hobbs in Minehead, Somerset. He remained at the same stable from 2004 to his retirement in 2023, becoming first jockey for Hobbs when Richard Johnson retired in 2021.

In the 2005/06 season, O'Brien was crowned champion amateur rider with 32 winners, including Captain Corelli in the Tommy Whittle Chase at Haydock Park. He turned professional in June of that year, winning two races at his first professional race meeting. In the 2006/07 season he was champion conditional jockey with 123 wins, a tally that remained his career-best.

In 2007 O'Brien rode McKelvey, trained by Peter Bowen, into second place behind Silver Birch in the Grand National. In the 2008 Grand National, McKelvey unseated O'Brien at the twentieth fence, went on to jump the next fence riderless, fell and was euthanized.

He achieved his first Cheltenham Festival win in 2009 when he rode Silk Affair to victory in the Fred Winter Juvenile Novices' Handicap Hurdle. He won the Welsh Grand National on Dream Alliance, trained by Hobbs, in 2009 and Elegant Escape, trained by Colin Tizzard, in 2018.

In August 2021 O'Brien reached a landmark of 1,000 winners in Britain and Ireland, one of only seven active jump jockeys to do so. All but one of the wins were in Britain; O'Brien's only victory in Ireland was on I Hear A Symphony for Philip Hobbs at the Punchestown Festival in 2008. He achieved his second Cheltenham Festival win in 2022 on Third Wind in the Pertemps Final.

O'Brien announced his retirement on 29 April 2023 before his final ride, in which his mount Thyme Hill finished fourth in the Select Hurdle at Sandown. Following his retirement, he became a steward for the British Horseracing Authority.

== Personal life and death ==
O'Brien and his wife, Hayley, had two sons. He died from cancer in November 2026, aged 39.

== Cheltenham Festival winners ==
- Fred Winter Juvenile Novices' Handicap Hurdle – (1) – Silk Affair (2009)
- Pertemps Final – (1) – Third Wind (2022)

== Major wins ==
Great Britain

- Challow Novices' Hurdle – (1) – Souffleur (2009)
- Tolworth Hurdle – (2) – Finian's Oscar (2017), Elixir Du Nutz (2019)
- Liverpool Hurdle – (1) Thyme Hill (2021)
- Kauto Star Novices' Chase – (1) – Thyme Hill (2022)
