= Malcolm Jefferson =

British horse trainer

Joseph Malcolm Jefferson (1 December 1946 – 2 February 2018) was a British horse trainer who specialized in training horses competing in National Hunt racing.

Jefferson was born in Penrith and worked as travelling head lad to Gordon W. Richards between 1968 and 1981. He began training in 1981 and registered his first winner in a bumper at Perth in September of that year. He continued to train from stables at Norton, North Yorkshire until his death.

Jefferson's most notable successes were gained by Dato Star, who won the Champion Bumper in 1995 and the Christmas Hurdle in 1999. In 2012 he achieved the notable feat of a "double double" at the Cheltenham Festival and Aintree Festival, winning races with Cape Tribulation and Attaglance at both meetings. Jefferson also trained winners in Flat racing, winning the Zetland Stakes in 1983 with High Debate.

Jefferson died in February 2018 aged 71. Nicky Henderson described him as "...a lovely man and a very talented trainer. We’d always see him when we went north, and he was always cheerful."

Notable winners

Champion Bumper 1995

Fighting Fifth Hurdle 1998, 1999

Christmas Hurdle 1999

Top Novices' Hurdle 2015

Champion Hurdle Trial 1998, 2000

Pertemps Final 1994, 2012

Martin Pipe Conditional Jockeys' Handicap Hurdle 2012
