= Jonjo O'Neill (horse racing) =

Irish horseracing trainer and former jockey (born 1952)

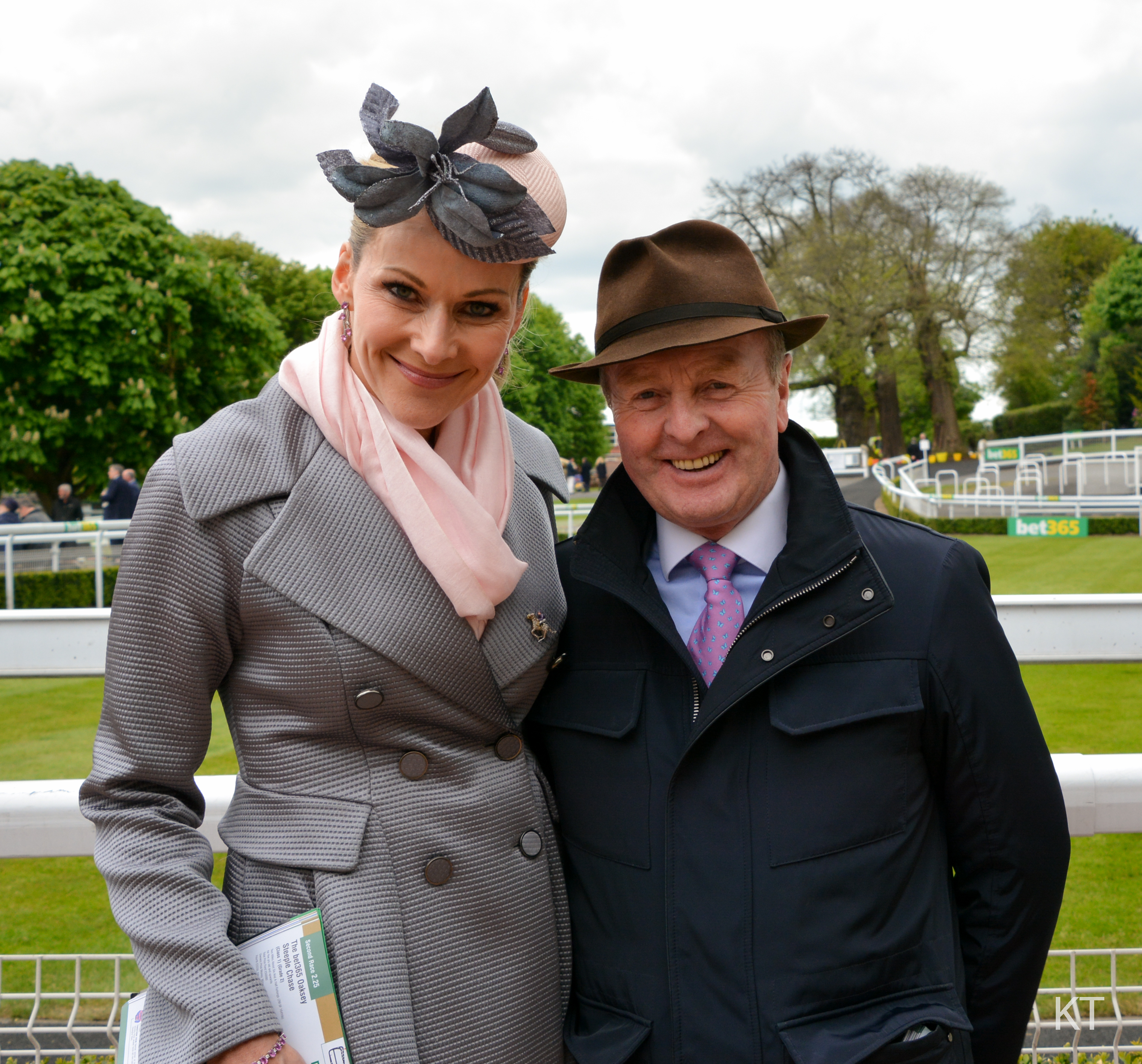
- Jonjo O'Neill and Jacqui O'Neill at Sandown, 2017

Personal information
- Born: 13 April 1952 (age 74) Castletownroche, County Cork, Ireland
- Occupation: Trainer

Horse racing career
- Sport: Horse racing
- Career wins: 900 + (as a jockey), 2400 + (as a trainer (to 2023))

Major racing wins
- As a steeplechase jockey: Cheltenham Gold Cup (1979 & 1986), Champion Hurdle (1980 & 1984) As a trainer in English steeplechasing: Cheltenham Gold Cup (2012); Grand National (2010); Irish Grand National (2014)

Racing awards
- British jump racing Champion Jockey

John Joseph "Jonjo" O'Neill (born 13 April 1952) is an Irish National Hunt racehorse trainer and former jockey.

== Life and career ==
He was born in Castletownroche, County Cork in Ireland. Based at the Jackdaws Castle training establishment in England. O'Neill twice won the British Champion Jockey title (1977–78 & 1979–80) and won the Cheltenham Gold Cup on the mare, Dawn Run who became the only horse to complete the double of winning the Champion Hurdle and the Gold Cup at the Cheltenham Festival. He won 900 races as a jockey.

At the 2009 Cheltenham Festival, Wichita Lineman, an O'Neill-trained horse, won the William Hill Trophy. On 10 April 2010, Jonjo O'Neill trained Don't Push It to win the Grand National. In seven attempts as a jockey he had never completed the course but Don't Push It, ridden by the champion jockey Tony McCoy (whose best finishes in fourteen previous attempts had been third places) overtook Black Apalachi at the last fence and pulled clear on the run-in to win by five lengths. In March 2012 he trained Synchronised to win the Cheltenham Gold Cup.

His son, also named Jonjo, is a National Hunt jockey.

== Major wins as jockey ==
(United Kingdom) Great Britain

- Cheltenham Gold Cup – (2) Alverton (1979), Dawn Run (1986)
- Champion Hurdle – (2) – Sea Pigeon (1980), Dawn Run (1984)
- Christmas Hurdle – (2) Ekbalco (1982), Dawn Run (1983)
- Fighting Fifth Hurdle – (1) Out of the Gloom (1985)
- Finale Juvenile Hurdle – (1) Out of The Gloom (1984)
- Scilly Isles Novices' Chase – (1) Karenomore (1985)
- Anniversary 4-Y-O Novices' Hurdle – (1) Starfen (1980)
- Top Novices' Hurdle – (2) Prousto (1978), Rimondo (1979)
- Mersey Novices' Hurdle – (1) Out of the Gloom (1985)
- Maghull Novices' Chase – (1) Night Nurse (1979)
- Liverpool Hurdle – (1) Prominent King (1979)

(Republic of Ireland) Ireland

- Irish Champion Hurdle – (2) Royal Vulcan (1983), Dawn Run (1984)

== Major wins as trainer ==
(United Kingdom) Great Britain

- Grand National – (1) Don't Push It (2010)
- Christmas Hurdle – (2) Intersky Falcon (2002,2003)
- Finale Juvenile Hurdle – (1) Hunt Hill (1998)
- Challow Novices' Hurdle – (3) Coolnagorna (2003), Wichita Lineman (2007), Taquin du Seuil (2013)
- Tolworth Novices' Hurdle – (2) Miros (2002), Lingo (2004)
- Anniversary 4-Y-O Novices' Hurdle – (1) Quazar (2002)
- Betway Bowl – (1) Exotic Dancer (2007)
- Aintree Hurdle – (1) Rhinestone Cowboy (2004)
- Melling Chase – (1) Albertas Run (2010)
- Sefton Novices' Hurdle – (1) Black Jack Ketchum (2006)
- Mildmay Novices' Chase – (1) Holywell (2014)
- Cheltenham Gold Cup – (1) Synchronised (2012)

(Republic of Ireland) Ireland

- Punchestown Champion Hurdle (1) Quazar (2003)
- Champion Stayers Hurdle – (2) Rhinestone Cowboy (2004), Refinement (2007)
- Champion INH Flat Race – (1) Refinement (2005)
- Savills Chase – (2) Exotic Dancer (2008), Synchronised (2011)
- Champion Four Year Old Hurdle – (2) Quazar (2002), Cherub (2004)
- Irish Grand National – (2) Butlers Cabin (2007), Shutthefrontdoor (2014)

== Cheltenham Festival winners (27) ==
- Cheltenham Gold Cup – (1) Synchronised (2012)
- Stayers' Hurdle – (2) Iris's Gift (2004), More Of That (2014)
- Ryanair Chase – (2) Albertas Run (2010,2011)
- Triumph Hurdle – (1) Spectroscope (2003)
- Albert Bartlett Novices' Hurdle – (2) Black Jack Ketchum (2006), Wichita Lineman (2007)
- Golden Miller Novices' Chase – (1) Taquin du Seuil (2014)
- National Hunt Chase Challenge Cup – (6) Front Line (1995), Rith Dubh (2002), Sudden Shock (2003), Native Emperor (2004), Butler's Cabin (2007), Minella Rocco (2016)
- Festival Trophy Handicap Chase – (4) Wichita Lineman (2009), Alfie Sherrin (2012), Holywell (2014), Johnnywho (2026)
- County Handicap Hurdle – (2) Master Tern (2000), Wilful (2026)
- Pertemps Final – (4) Danny Connors (1991), Inching Closer (2003), Creon (2004), Holywell (2013)
- Fulke Walwyn Kim Muir Challenge Cup – (1) Sunnyhillboy (2012)
- St James's Place Foxhunter Chase – (1) Drombeag (2007)
- Johnny Henderson Grand Annual Chase – (1) Sky Pirate (2021)
