= Wetherby Racecourse =

Horse racing venue in West Yorkshire, England

Coordinates: 53°56′2″N 1°21′52″W

Wetherby

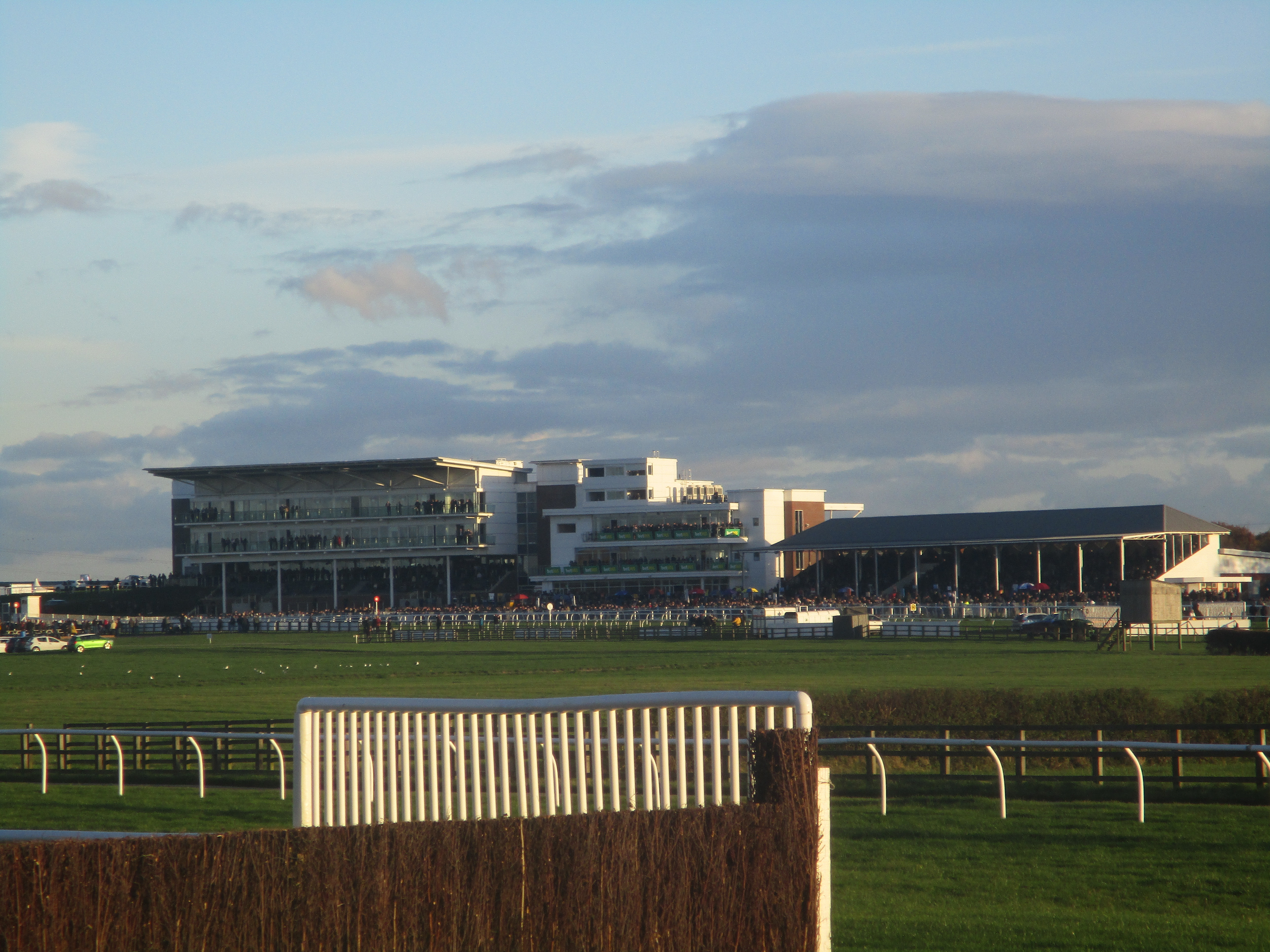
- The racecourse on 2021 Charlie Hall Chase day
- Interactive map of Wetherby
- Location: Wetherby, West Yorkshire
- Date opened: 1891
- Screened on: Racing TV
- Course type: Flat; National Hunt
- Notable races: West Yorkshire Hurdle; Charlie Hall Chase; Rowland Meyrick Handicap Chase

Wetherby Racecourse is a racecourse situated near the market town of Wetherby in West Yorkshire, England, located 12 miles (19 km) from Leeds city centre. For most of its history the course has hosted only National Hunt racing but has also staged Flat racing since 2015. A circuit of the course is around 1½ miles.

The current racecourse opened in 1891 but the Wetherby area has played host to racing since the late 17th century and potentially even in Roman times. Racing was being held on Wetherby Ings but moved to the current site in 1891, and has grown ever since. Facilities have regularly been improved from extremely basic buildings ever since opening, and the racecourse has benefitted from both rail and road links. It was used for billeting during World War II.

More recent developments include the opening of the Millennium Stand in 2000, the Bramham Hall in 2007 and the Millennium West development in 2017, befitting a racecourse which hosts many significant races, most notably the Charlie Hall Chase; this Grade 2 race is often used by staying chasers to start their season, and past winners have included One Man, See More Business and Cue Card.

== History ==
=== Previous racing near Wetherby ===
The history of horse racing near to Wetherby may stretch back to the Roman era, with races believed to have been organised by Emperor Septimius Severus close to nearby Netherby. It has even been suggested that this racing was the earliest ever to take place in England, although it is hard to substantiate that claim.

The later 17th century appears to be when regular racing began in the Wetherby area, with a London Gazette record from 1683 advertising a 'horse course' at Clifford Moor 'for two considerable plates valued at £50'. Queen Anne provided a gold cup to be run for at the course early the following century, yet by later that century, racing had moved to the 'Bottoms' opposite Wetherby Grange. It would later be transferred to Parkhill, where races were regularly held in the early 19th century. There is a record of racing at Parkhill from February 1842.

Lord Leconfield was persuaded to allow the steeplechases to move to Wetherby Ings near Linton, and the new course was laid out in 1842-43. Henry Hall Dixon, known by his pen name of 'The Druid', described the Ings course as 'the best in England, bar none'. Initial events at the Ings were informal and organised by local hunting and military figures, the military flavour coming from the local garrisons at York, Ripon and Wetherby. A notable surviving record from this time is an 1865 racecard showing a Grand National Hunt Committee race won by a horse named Emperor. It is estimated that 30,000 people attended that particular fixture. The Wetherby Hunt Committee organised a meeting in 1874 featuring a hunter chase sponsored by the Mayor of Leeds, who donated a silver cup.

In 1878, local businessmen and racing enthusiasts (led by Henry Crossley, founder of The Wetherby News) established a racing committee in an attempt to professionalise the racing. The committee realised more funding was required so a sixpence entry fee for the popular side was introduced in 1884; this almost led to a riot as admission was previously free.

Exorbitant rent increases and a failed attempt to purchase the land forced a move away from the Ings. The final Easter Monday and Tuesday meeting at the Ings (which was by then a tradition) took place in 1890 and Lycett Green’s horse Riston, ridden by Mr. Wilmot-Smith, won the main race on the last ever day of racing at the Ings. Trial meetings took place below Priest Hill and at Micklethwaite Ings but the sites proved unpopular.

=== Early history of York Road ===
Four men came together to develop the current racecourse site off York Road: Henry Crossley, William Atkinson and John and Charles Long. The first meeting was held in Easter 1891 on land owned by Capt Montagu of Ingmanthorpe Hall. The Riston trio would be victorious again at this first meeting, but the first winner at the course was Alberta as 4/6 favourite.

In 1901, the five-member Wetherby Steeplechase Committee drew up new rules and set aside a reserve fund 'for carrying on of the races at Wetherby for ever'. The initially makeshift course was also improved, with a grandstand and weighing room in place by 1906. Provision of water supplies was also installed. However, the pace of change would slow in World War I, when a hospital was erected at the course.

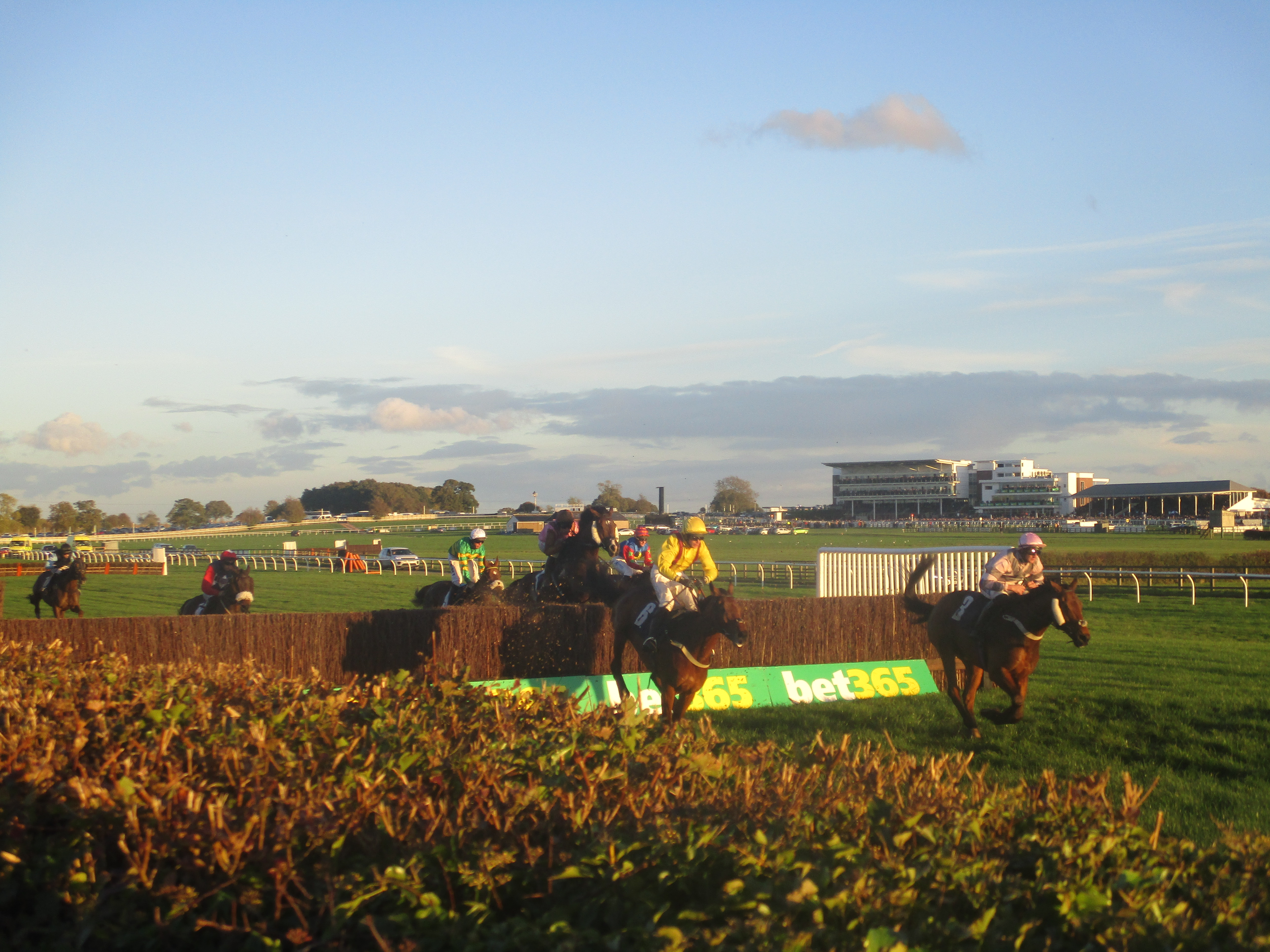
Horses jumping a fence on the back straight during the final race of 2021 Charlie Hall Chase day

When the lease expired in 1920, the new Wetherby Steeplechase Committee Ltd was formed comprising the remaining members of the race committee (Messrs Crossley, Atkinson and Charles Long, the former being chairman) along with Capt Montagu (the owner, who'd suggested forming the new company), Wilmot-Smith and Leeds corn merchant Kenneth Wilson. Rowland Meyrick was also a member and became clerk of the course, remaining so until 1947. The new Company received all money and assets free of charge as part of the agreement to form the Company with the National Hunt Committee in London. It was around this time that Wetherby races became more important; the course and facilities improved, and the prize money increased to encourage better quality horses to race at Wetherby. Construction of an owners and trainers ring, refreshment rooms and a small hospital and extensions to the main grandstand, jockeys' rooms and weighing room were among the modifications of this time. Royal visits would also occur, with Mary, Princess Royal visiting at Easter 1923 and Prince Henry, Duke of Gloucester that Whitsuntide.

Access by rail to the racecourse was also dramatically improved with the opening of Wetherby Racecourse railway station on 31 October 1924. Before its opening, passengers had to either walk or be conveyed by horse or taxi from Wetherby station in town; to walk from the station to the course would be over two miles. The more conveniently sited York Road station had closed in 1902, replaced by one at Linton Road. Henry Crossley had paid a key role in ensuring the station was built and the racecourse used it to its advantage. The Race Course Company paid for the horses' rail fares and free stabling and forage was provided. Special trains to carry racegoers came from Leeds, Doncaster, Bradford Exchange and Sheffield and this boosted reported attendances to over 40,000 at some fixtures. The station closed on Whit Monday (18 May) 1959 although special services from Bradford Exchange continued from the town station until 1963, a bus taking spectators to the course. Wetherby now has no railway station, the nearest being 12 to 15 miles away.

During World War II, the racecourse was requisitioned by the army for billeting like many large buildings in Wetherby.

=== Post-war history ===
Improvements resumed when Major W.T. Lipscomb took over as clerk, with the race company buying the freehold of the course in 1953. This led to a great many improvements up to the early 1970s, including land drainage, the building of a new Club Stand opened in 1967, enlargement of the Tattersalls stand, addition of photo finish cameras and a PA system, a new children's playground and facilities for on-course bookmakers. In 1958 a block of buildings, including restaurants, bars, the weighing room and the jockeys' changing room, burnt down; repairs to facilitate improved facilities for the jockeys took two years. All of the developments in this period cost £100,000.

Much-needed improvements to Wetherby's road network benefitted the racecourse by improving access. A bypass was built to divert the A1 around Wetherby (opened by Ernest Marples in October 1959), requiring land from the racecourse and reducing the length of a circuit of the course but improving the local road network. The York Road flyover also improved access when opened in 1966. Attendances grew, with a record crowd of 22,000 attending the 1968 Whitsuntide fixture. The year before, the course had held a bloodstock sale, with over forty horses for sale.

By 1975, the racecourse staged thirteen racedays. Development would continue into the 1980s, with a new Tote building constructed in 1985. The £4,000,000 Millennium Stand was opened in 2000, replacing the 1967 grandstand. The Bramham Hall, used both on racedays and for conference bookings, opened in 2007.

Since 2006 the racecourse has been the venue for the Mascot Gold Cup, a mascot race which is held over the final furlong over six 'fences' on their family day meeting each April. The race gained the Guinness World Record for the most mascots in a race in 2015.

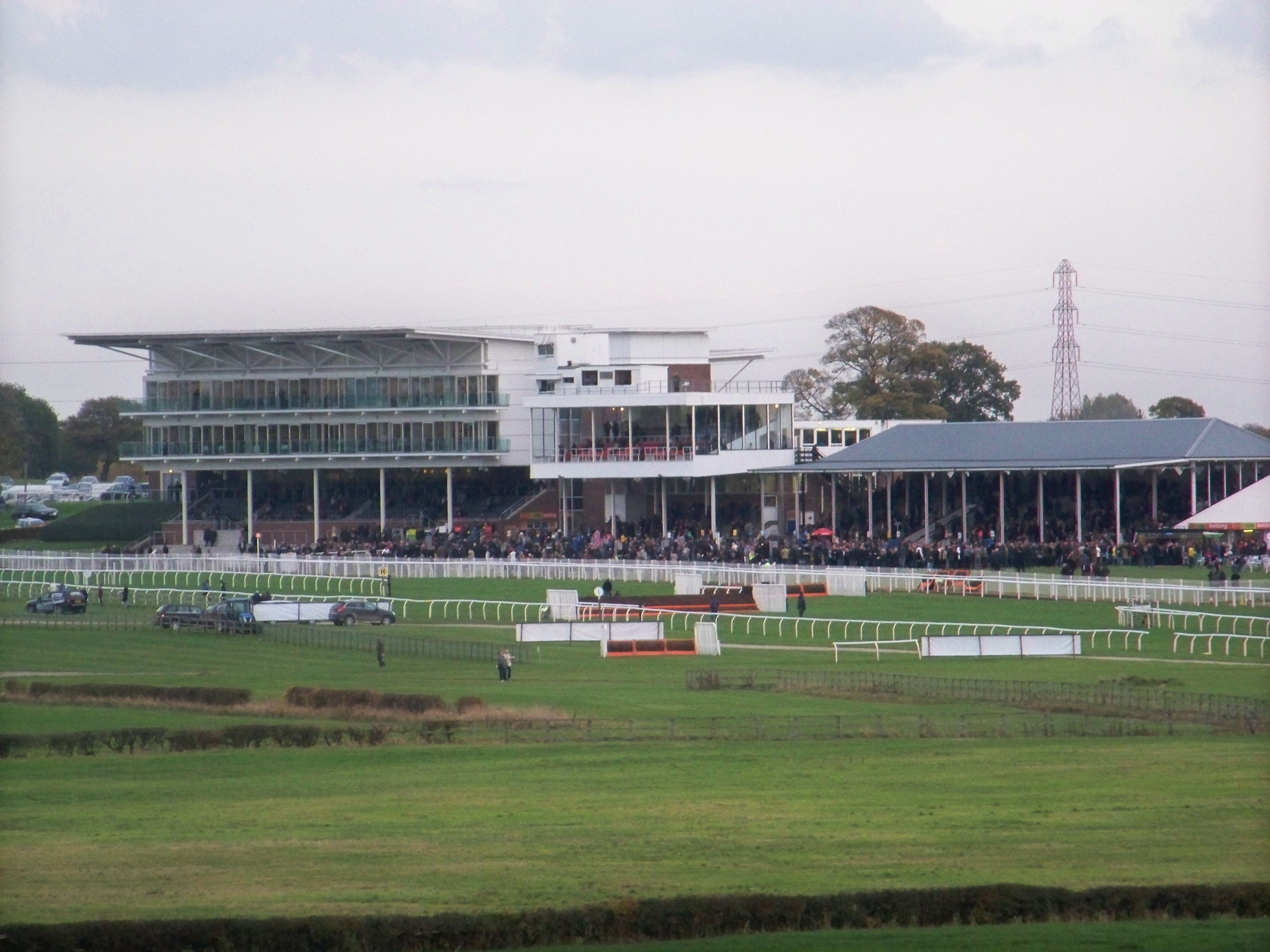
The course on 2010 Charlie Hall Chase day

In 2014, it emerged that for five years, many of the races at the course, including the Charlie Hall Chase, had been run over the incorrect distance. The discrepancy was caused by an emergency track modification made due to waterlogging in 2009, which was subsequently made permanent.

Wetherby Racecourse was the last racecourse in Yorkshire that hosted only National Hunt meetings, but it now stages Flat racing as well. The course announced early in 2014 that they were investigating staging summer Flat racing and were granted four fixtures when the 2015 list was released in October 2014. The first Flat racing fixture took place on 26 April 2015.

Redevelopment at the racecourse continued in the 2010s, with the Members' Grandstand (opened in 1960) being replaced by a new structure. It was estimated before construction to cost £3.2 million. The Millenium West Stand took less than a year to build, being completed in April 2017, although it didn't open until October of that year.

In 2021, a new entrance building was completed along with new footpaths to the coach park.

An episode of BBC series Bargain Hunt was filmed at an antiques fair held at the racecourse and was first broadcast in 2026.

== Course ==
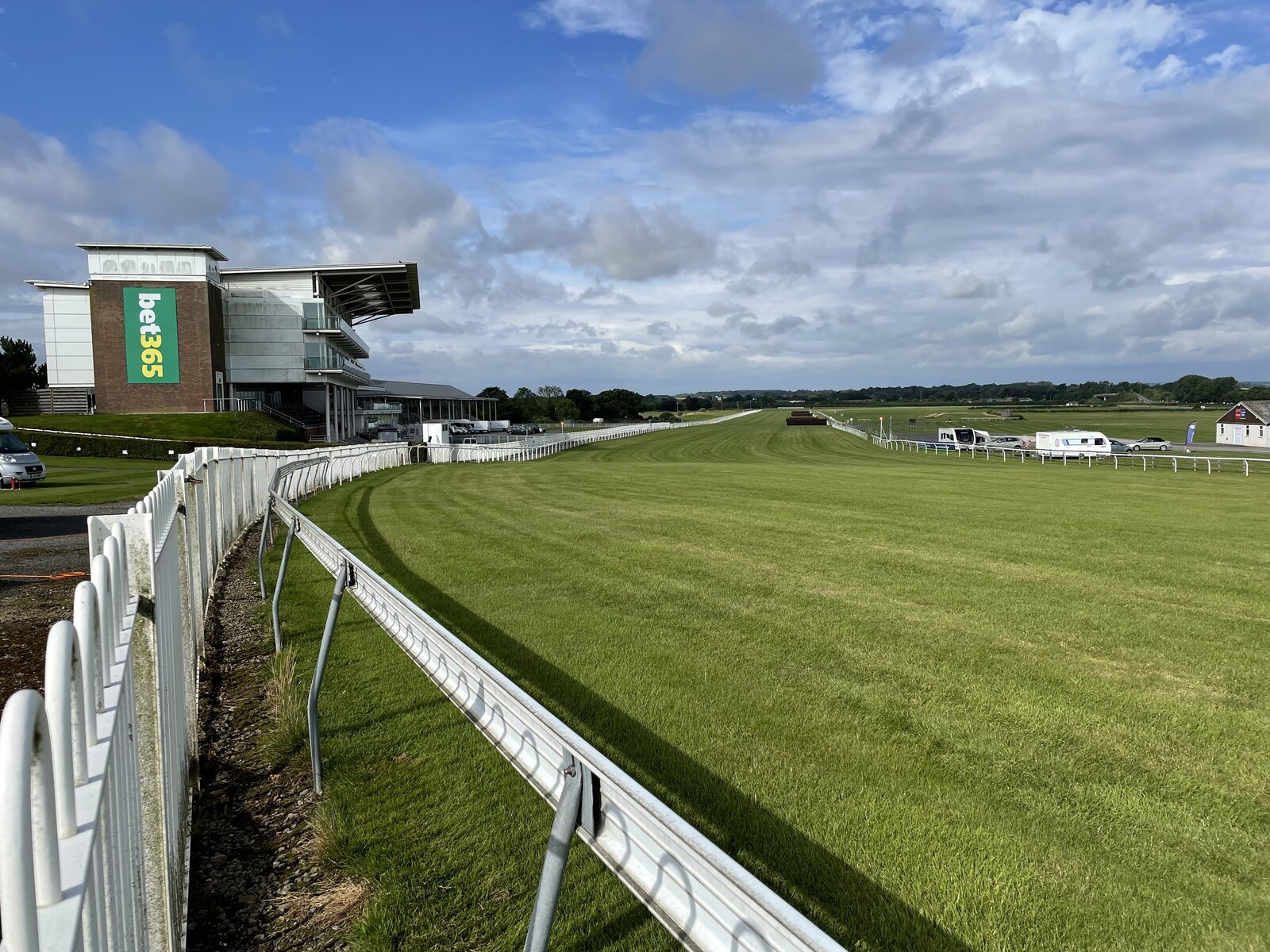
Looking down the home straight

The course (both jumps and flat) is a left-handed oval roughly one mile and four furlongs in circumference and easy bends. Apart from a climb past the winning post and a downhill run to the back straight, the track is flat until the slightly uphill run from where the last steeplechase fence is. The home straight is four furlongs in length.

=== National Hunt courses ===
There are nine steeplechase fences, four in the home straight and five, including an open ditch, down the back straight. The course had had two open ditches in the past, along with a water jump in front of the stands. The fences in the home straight were to the outside of the hurdles course but were switched to the inside due to issues caused by changes to the A1. The hurdles course was over fifty years ago tighter than the chase course, but it was replanned and now follows it throughout. There are six flights of hurdles, three in each straight.

The course suits long-striding horses that have stamina and, in the case of steeplechasers, good jumping ability. Fifteen National Hunt meetings were scheduled for 2026, including the two-day Charlie Hall Chase meeting and the two-day Christmas meeting on Boxing Day and 27 December.

=== Flat course ===
Flat races are run on the hurdles course. There is no straight course; races over 5½ furlongs start on a chute near the end of the back straight. It is said to suit horses that race prominently. The course was scheduled to host three flat meetings in 2026, one in April and two in June.

== Notable races ==
DOW	Month	Race Name	Type	Grade	Distance	Age/Sex
Friday	Oct / Nov	Crossley Handicap Chase	Chase	Premier Handicap	2m 3½f	4yo+
Friday	Oct / Nov	Wensleydale Juvenile Hurdle	Hurdle	Listed	2m	3yo
Saturday	Oct / Nov	Montagu Mares' Hurdle	Hurdle	Listed	2m	4yo+ m
Saturday	Oct / Nov	West Yorkshire Hurdle	Hurdle	Grade 2	3m	4yo+
Saturday	Oct / Nov	Charlie Hall Chase	Chase	Grade 2	3m	5yo+
Boxing Day	December	Rowland Meyrick Handicap Chase	Chase	Premier Handicap	3m	4yo+
27th	December	Castleford Chase	Chase	Handicap	1m 7f	4yo+

== Bibliography ==
- Chapman, Stephen (2011). Harrogate & Wetherby. Rudston: Bellcode. ISBN 978-1871233-24-7.
- Fairfax-Blakeborough, John (1924). Wetherby Races. The History of the Meeting. Wetherby: Henry Crossley.
- Gill, James (1975). Racecourses of Great Britain. London: Barrie & Jenkins. ISBN 0-2142-0090-6.
- Unwin, Robert (1986). Wetherby: The History of a Yorkshire Market Town. Wetherby Historical Trust. ISBN 0-9511968-0-4.
