= 1998 Grand National =

English steeplechase horse race

- Grand National
- Location: Aintree
- Date: 4 April 1998
- Winning horse: (United Kingdom) Earth Summit
- Starting price: 7/1 F
- Jockey: (United Kingdom) Carl Llewellyn
- Trainer: (United Kingdom) Nigel Twiston-Davies
- Owner: Summit Partnership
- Conditions: Heavy

External videos
- 1998 Grand National in full Racing UK, BBC Sport, YouTube

The 1998 Grand National (known as the Martell Grand National for sponsorship reasons) was the 151st official renewal of the world-famous Grand National steeplechase that took place at Aintree near Liverpool, England, on 4 April 1998.

The race was won in a time of 10 minutes and 51.5 seconds and by a distance of 11 lengths by the 7/1 favourite Earth Summit, ridden by jockey Carl Llewellyn. The winner was trained by Nigel Twiston-Davies at Grange Hill Farm in Naunton, Gloucestershire, and ran in the colours of the six-member Summit Partnership, which included Aintree press officer Nigel Payne and former Hereford United footballer Ricky George.

Thirty-seven runners took part and six completed the course without mishap, but three horses were fatally injured during the race.

The main race was seen by the smallest Grand National attendance at Aintree since 1985, with a crowd of just 46,679, over 11,000 less than two years prior. It came a year after the 1997 Grand National had to be postponed due to a bomb threat.

== Leading contenders ==
Earth Summit was made the 7/1 favourite, backed down from 10/1 on the morning of the race, after heavy rain on raceday made the ground officially soft, suiting this long-distance mudlark who had won the Welsh National at Chepstow in December, having previously won the Scottish National in 1994 when still a novice. 1992 National winning rider Carl Llewellyn deputised for the injured Tom Jenks, keeping the horse prominent on the first circuit, taking the water jump in sixth place. The favourite moved up to dispute the lead five fences from home and was involved in a straight match with Suny Bay from the third-last before kicking ahead just before the final flight to win a gruelling race by 11 lengths.

Him Of Praise was an eight-year-old who had never finished outside the places in his 11 career starts, including eight over the distance of 3 miles. His preparation for the National had included four victories, including the Peter Cazelet/Anthony Mildmay memorial chase at Sandown in January before finishing third in the Singer & Friedlander Grand National trial at Uttoxeter and second ahead of Earth Summit, who finished fifth in the Red Square Vodka Gold Cup at Haydock in February. Him Of Praise was thought to prefer soft ground and a combination of the rain and his partnership with Irish Champion jockey Charlie Swan saw him backed down to joint-favourite until shortly before the start, before being sent off at 8/1. The partnership was a distant last of seven runners still standing four fences from home when he refused.

Samlee was a nine-year-old who came to prominence after winning the Becher Chase over one circuit of the Aintree Grand National course in November, having been second in the Scottish Grand National earlier in the year. Another victory in a modest 3 mile 6 furlong chase at Sandown followed in December before finishing third to Earth Summit in the Welsh National and third again in the Eider Chase at Newcastle in February. Two-time winning rider Richard Dunwoody, who was also the most experienced rider in this year's contest, took the ride with the pairing sent off as 8/1 joint-second favourite. Samlee was in touch for a circuit and a half, jumped the Canal Turn in fifth place, and although his position improved to third after two of those ahead of him fell he was unable to make any headway on the two leaders and was a distance behind them turning back onto the racecourse before being nursed home in third place.

Rough Quest was the only former winner in the field, having won the race with Mick Fitzgerald in 1996. This season he had been second in the Tommy Whittle Chase at Haydock in December before finishing third in the King George VI Chase at Kempton on Boxing Day behind Challenger Du Luc. A fall in the Cheltenham Gold Cup 16 days before the National did not deter the public from making him the favourite on the morning of the race before drifting to 11/1 at the off. Fitzgerald again took the ride but the ground was always against the former champion who began to struggle at the Canal Turn on the second circuit before being pulled up four fences from home when lying a distant sixth.

Suny Bay was a grey that had finished second in the previous year's National. Since then he had won both the Edward Hanmer Memorial Chase and Hennessy Gold Cup at Haydock and Newbury respectively in November before running unplaced in the King George VI Chase and Cheltenham Gold Cup. Despite being allocated the 12 stone top handicap weight for the National he was still backed down to 11/1 at the off. Graham Bradley took the ride and the pair ran prominently throughout and pulled clear of the remainder of the field with three fences left to jump to enter a match with Earth Summit. The grey was unable to respond when his rival quickened into the final flight and was unable to get back on terms before being eased up in the final hundred yards to finish 11 lengths down in second.

Other contestants that attracted attention on race day were Challenger Du Luc, 1996 Sun Alliance Chase winner Nahthen Lad (who had finished ninth in last year's National), Banjo, Dun Belle and St. Mellion Fairway, who finished fourth at 20/1.

Of the nine riders making their debut in the race only experienced French rider Thiery Doumen was seriously considered on Ciel de Brion, however it was Ken Whelan who took the debut honours as the only one of the nine to complete the course, finishing fifth. There were also debut rides for Richard McGrath, Seamus Durack and Rupert Wakeley while the remaining four riders all experienced their only Grand National ride. Future racing trainers Tom Dascombe and John Supple, amateur rider Gordon Shenkin and troubled Australian champion rider Jamie Evans all departed on the first circuit.

== Finishing order ==
Position	Horse	Jockey	Age	Weight (st-lb)	SP	Distance
1st	Earth Summit	Carl Llewellyn	10	10-05	7/1 F	Won by 11 lengths
2nd	Suny Bay (IRE)	Graham Bradley	9	12-00	11/1	A distance
3rd	Samlee (IRE)	Richard Dunwoody	9	10-01	8/1	1¼ lengths
4th	St. Mellion Fairway (IRE)	Andrew Thornton	9	10-01	20/1	27 lengths
5th	Gimme Five	Kenny Whelan	11	10-00	25/1	A distance
6th	Killeshin	Sean Curran	12	10-00	25/1	Last to complete

== Non-finishers ==
Fence	Horse	Jockey	Age	Weight (st-lb)	SP	Fate
1	Banjo (FRA)	Richard Johnson	8	10-07	14/1	Fell
1	Challenger Du Luc (FRA)	Tony McCoy	8	11-03	12/1	Fell
1	Diwali Dancer	Robert Thornton	8	10-00	100/1	Fell
1	Pashto	John Kavanagh	11	10-00	100/1	Fell
1	What A Hand	Chris Maude	10	10-00	66/1	Unseated rider
3	Fabricator	John Supple	12	10-00	150/1	Fell
4	Do Rightly (IRE)	Paul Holley	9	10-00	100/1	Fell
5	Celtic Abbey	Norman Williamson	10	10-00	33/1	Fell
5	Griffins Bar	Glenn Tormey	10	10-00	200/1	Fell
6 (Becher's Brook)	Choisty (IRE)	Richard McGrath	8	10-00	40/1	Fell
6 (Becher's Brook)	Court Melody (IRE)	Timmy Murphy	10	10-04	25/1	Fell
9 (Valentine's)	Dun Belle (IRE)	Tom Treacy	9	10-00	18/1	Unseated rider
11	Damas (FRA)	Jamie Evans	7	10-00	200/1	Refused
11	General Crack (IRE)	Joe Tizzard	9	10-01	40/1	Pulled up
11	Nahthen Lad (IRE)	Rod Farrant	9	10-03	13/1	Unseated rider
14	Maple Dancer	Mr. Gordon Shenkin	12	10-00	200/1	Pulled up
15 (The Chair)	Pond House (IRE)	Tom Dascombe	9	10-00	66/1	Pulled up
17	Joe White	Tim McCarthy	12	10-00	150/1	Pulled up
17	Into The Red	Dean Gallagher	14	10-00	50/1	Pulled up
17	Go Universal (IRE)	Seamus Durack	10	10-00	66/1	Pulled up
17	Hillwalk	Rupert Wakeley	12	10-00	150/1	Pulled up
17	Radical Choice (IRE)	Brian Storey	9	10-00	66/1	Pulled up
19	Yeoman Warrior	Richard Guest	11	10-01	100/1	Pulled up
21	Winter Belle (USA)	Mr. Chris Bonner	10	10-00	100/1	Pulled up
24 (Canal Turn)	Brave Highlander (IRE)	Philip Hide	10	10-00	25/1	Unseated rider
26	Ciel De Brion (FRA)	Thiery Doumen	8	10-00	16/1	Fell
26	Scotton Banks (IRE)	Lorcan Wyer	10	10-00	33/1	Unseated rider
27	Decyborg (FRA)	Paul Carberry	7	10-00	200/1	Pulled up
27	Greenhil Tare Away	Simon McNeill	10	10-00	100/1	Unseated rider
27	Him Of Praise (IRE)	Charlie Swan	8	10-00	8/1	Refused
29	Rough Quest	Mick Fitzgerald	12	11-04	11/1	Pulled up

Stormtracker was withdrawn the day before the race as he was unsuited to the softening ground. Avro Anson was withdrawn on the morning of the race also due to the unsuitability of the conditions.

== Media coverage and aftermath ==
The BBC retained the rights to broadcast the entire three-day meeting live for the 39th consecutive year, with the racing on the Thursday and Friday being broadcast on BBC Two while the Saturday was broadcast as part of a Grandstand special on BBC One, presented by Des Lynam. Richard Pitman and Peter Scudamore provided in-depth analysis of all the races on the card with a detailed preview and re-run of the National itself. Future anchor presenter Clare Balding interviewed the connections of the runners before the race in the parade ring. Among the several cameras used for the race was a camera set inside the cap of rider Richard Johnson. The jockey cam, as it was called, became a regular feature in years to come but in this year hopes of unique pictures of the race were dashed when Johnson fell from his mount at the first fence.

This was to be the first National of the television era where the winner would not be called home by Peter O'Sullevan, as 'the voice of racing' had retired the previous year. Jim McGrath took over the anchor role with Tony O'Hehir covering the field from the fence before Becher's to Valentine's as his father Michael had done from 1967 to 1969. John Hanmer became the senior member of the team, covering the runners over the early fences and coming back towards the racecourse for the 27th consecutive year. BBC Radio covered the race for the 67th time with Peter Bromley calling the winner home.

The race was also televised live into bookmakers' outlets by Racing UK using the racecourse commentary team, consisting of Graham Goode, Ian Bartlett and John Hunt. Goode called the runners home, while all of the national daily newspapers published full colour pullouts with racecard-style guides to the runners.

After the bomb scare of 1997, security was tighter at the 1998 National than at any meeting before or since while only a limited number of vehicles with a special permit were allowed inside the racecourse. Security concerns were increased when a bomb was discovered in the Irish port of Dún Laoghaire a few days before the race, though police stated that there were no indications that the bomb was destined for Aintree.

The deaths of three equine competitors meant the race drew much media attention and public criticism and questions were raised over the safety of the race, however it was later found that only one of the three deaths, that of Pashto at the first fence, was as a direct result of a fall at a fence. The vet reported that Do Rightly suffered a heart attack on takeoff at the fourth fence while Griffins Bar suffered a broken shoulder while galloping and not while jumping a fence. The Jockey Club launched an enquiry into the three deaths with questions raised as to the suitability of all three runners to compete in the National. Over the course of the years ahead the qualification standards for horses to take part were tightened.

== Quotes ==
- Carl Llewellyn (1st): "[Graham Bradley] told me after three out it had to be one of us. And it was me. I'm a bit of a jammy git - Tom Jenks should have ridden him."
- Graham Bradley (2nd): "He gave me a great ride. His ears are like antennae - he tells me when he wants to be short and when he wants to be long."
- Richard Dunwoody (3rd): "He was one paced and made mistakes; all he did was keep plodding on."
- Andrew Thornton (4th): "[Richard Dunwoody] was a real legend. We agreed to stay together until we jumped the last, but then he did me half-a-length for third place!"
- Ken Whelan (5th): "The ground was too soft and I was pushing all the way."
- Sean Curran (6th): "He was staying on when we were hampered and I came off. But for that we might have finished fourth. I remounted to finish."
- John Kavanagh (on Pashto, who fell fatally at the first fence): "We were too tight approaching it, he hit it halfway up and turned over."
- Norman Williamson (on Celtic Abbey, who fell at the fifth): "He didn't get high enough."
- Timmy Murphy (on Court Melody, who fell at Becher's first time): "The race went very quickly for me."
- Tom Treacy (on Dun Belle, unseated at Valentine's first time): "She slipped into the fence and hit it. I went out the side."
- Tim McCarthy (on Joe White, pulled up after the 14th): "We were nearly brought down at the first when Banjo fell."
- Philip Hide (on Brave Highlander, unseated at the Canal Turn second time): "I was going well but he made an awkward jump."
- Thiery Doumen (on Ciel De Brion, who fell at the 26th): "He was getting tired and couldn't put in a big enough jump. It's been the thrill of a lifetime."
- Lorcan Wyer (on Scotton Banks, unseated at the 26th): "He went well for a long way but wasn't enjoying the ground."
- Charlie Swan (on Him Of Praise, refused at the 27th): "He got a fright at the first ditch and jumped a bit big after that. He was running lazily - he had his ears pricked for the half mile or so until we parted company."
- Mick Fitzgerald (on Rough Quest, pulled up before the 29th): "I thought when we jumped Becher's second time we were going to win. But he ran out of stamina on this ground."
