= Rossington Main Novices' Hurdle =

Hurdle horse race in Britain

Rossington Main Novices' Hurdle
2026
Old Park Star	Hurricane Pat	Soldier Reeves

Previous years
2025
Dedicated Hero	Cloonainra	Peacenik
2024
Jeriko Du Reponet	Lump Sum	Fiercely Proud
2022
Jonbon	Richmond Lake	Might
2021
Faivoir	Minella Drama	Nada To Prada

2020-2011
2020
Stolen Silver	Edwardstone	Thebannerkingrebel
2019
Mister Fisher	Bright Forecast	Muratello
2018
First Flow	Midnight Shadow	Lisdoonvarna Lad
2017
Neon Wolf	Elgin	Crievehill
2016
Its'afreebee	Le Prezien	Vieux Lille
2015
Aso	Kiama Bay	Qewy
2014
Zamdy Man	Un Temps Pour Tout	Meadowcroft Boy
2012
Cinders And Ashes	Double Ross	Oscar Nominee

2010-2001
2010
Peddlers Cross	Scriptwriter	Radium
2009
Alfie Flits	Son of Flicka	Mcmurrough
2008
Tazbar	Whiteoak	Osako D'airy
2007
Amaretto Rose	Astarador	Mohayer
2006
Nous Voila	Livingonaknifedge	Percussionist
2005
Roman Ark	Baby Run	Turpin Green
2004
Mon Villez	Le Passing	Salhood
2003
Rhinestone Cowboy	Always Rainbows	Stormy Lord

2000-1991
2000
Dusk Duel	Nemisto	Final Settlement
1999
Tonoco	Crazy Horse	Go Boldly
1998
Foundry Lane	Wahiba Sands	Circus Star
1997
Le Teteu	Hurricane Lamp	Green Green Desert
1994
Cumbrian Challenge	Scobie Boy	Surrey Dancer
1993
Frickley	Dreamers Delight	Stormhead
1991
Ruling	Book Of Gold	Viceroy Jester

1990-1988
1990
Peanuts Pet	Rakes Lane	Sacre D'Or
1989
Cruising Altitude	Greenhills Joy	Antinous
1988
Drumlin Hill	Merry Junior	Silk Thread

The Rossington Main Novices' Hurdle is a Grade 2 National Hunt hurdle race in Great Britain which is open to horses aged four years or older. It is run at Haydock Park over a distance of about 1 mile 7½ furlongs (1 mile 7 furlongs 144 yards, or 3,149 metres), and during its running there are nine hurdles to be jumped. The race is for novice hurdlers, and it is scheduled to take place each year in January.

The race was first run at Doncaster in 1948 and continued there until 1997. The following year it was moved to Wetherby. It was transferred to its present home, Haydock Park, in 2005. The 2012 running was sponsored by William Hill and run as the Williamhill.com "Supreme Trial" Novices' Hurdle and since 2014 it has been sponsored by Sky Bet.

== Winners ==
- Separate divisions of the race indicated by (1) and (2).

Year	Winner	Age	Jockey	Trainer
1948	Victory	8	John Morahan	Ernest Street
1949	Miraculous Atom	5	Mick Murray	Charlie Hall
1950	Ravenstone	4	Tim Molony	Dutton
1951	Forethought	5	Fred Winter	C Jelliss
1952	Abandoned due to death of King George VI
1953	Culgaith	6	Dick Curran	Charlie Hall
1954	Abandoned due to frost
1955	Thinice	5	Taffy Williams	Ernest Carr
1956	Abandoned due to frost and snow
1957	Grand Morn	5	Tim Molony	Arthur Stephenson
1958	Skate Up	7	Gerry Scott	Neville Crump
1959	Abandoned due to frost
1960 (1)	Mozie Law	5	Johnny East	Neville Crump
1960 (2)	Costa Brava	6	George Slack	Robert Renton
1961 (1)	Eiger	7	Mr Colin Moore	Pat Moore
1961 (2)	Honeytown	7	Michael Wilkinson	Ken Oliver
1962	Abandoned due to frost
1963	Abandoned due to frost
1964 (1)	London Gazette	5	Greville Starkey	Harry Thomson Jones
1964 (2)	Findon	5	George Milburn	R Fairbairn
1965	Abandoned due to snow
1966	Abandoned due to waterlogging
1967 (1)	Grey Imp	4	Mick Clark	George Vergette
1967 (2)	Supermaster	4	Paddy Broderick	Arthur Stephenson
1968 (1)	Polly's Henry	4	Brian Fletcher	Denys Smith
1968 (2)	Parlour Moor	4	Stan Hayhurst	W Easterby
1969 (1)	Trentuno	4	Colin Parker	Bobby Hall
1969 (2)	Sapper	4	Macer Gifford	Jim Watts
1970	Abandoned due to frost
1971	Pry	5	Eddie Harty	Toby Balding
1972	The Bugler	4	Robin Griffin	Jakie Astor
1973	Dark Sultan	5	Ron Barry	P Chisman
1974	Charlie Mouse	5	Graham Thorner	Tim Forster
1975	Sea Pigeon	5	Ron Barry	Gordon W. Richards
1976	Grand Canyon	6	Peter Haynes	Derek Kent
1977	French Hollow	5	Michael Dickinson	Tony Dickinson
1978	Newgate	5	Ridley Lamb	A Scott
1979	No Bombs	4	Nigel Tinkler	Peter Easterby
1980	Pulse Rate	4	Alan Brown	Peter Easterby
1981	Hard About	5	T Ryan	Edward O'Grady
1982	Gaye Brief	5	Sam Morshead	Mrs Mercy Rimell
1983	Cardinal Flower	6	Jonjo O'Neill	A Scott
1984	Abandoned due to snow
1985	Abandoned due to frost and snow
1986	Shean Lad	6	Phil Tuck	Lynn Siddall
1987	Abandoned due to frost and snow
1988	Drumlin Hill	5	Peter Scudamore	Fred Winter
1989	Cruising Altitude	6	Simon Sherwood	Oliver Sherwood
1990	Peanuts Pet	5	Trevor Wall	Bryan McMahon
1991	Ruling	5	Peter Niven	Fulke Johnson Houghton
1992	Abandoned due to frost
1993	Frickley	7	Neale Doughty	Gordon W. Richards
1994	Cumbrian Challenge	5	Lorcan Wyer	Peter Easterby
1995	Abandoned due to snow
1996	Abandoned due to frost
1997	Le Teteu	4	Russ Garritty	Bob Jones
1998	Foundry Lane	7	Lorcan Wyer	Mary Reveley
1999	Tonoco	6	Seamus Durack	Sue Smith
2000	Dusk Duel	5	Mick Fitzgerald	Nicky Henderson
2001	Abandoned due to waterlogging
2002	Abandoned due to waterlogging
2003	Rhinestone Cowboy	7	Norman Williamson	Jonjo O'Neill
2004	Mon Villez	5	Andrew Tinkler	Nicky Henderson
2005	Roman Ark	7	Fergus King	Malcolm Jefferson
2006	Nous Voila	5	Timmy Murphy	Martin Pipe
2007	Amaretto Rose	6	Mick Fitzgerald	Nicky Henderson
2008 (Note: The 2008 race was switched from Haydock Park to Doncaster after the original fixture was abandoned due to waterlogging.)	Tazbar	6	Phil Kinsella	Keith Reveley
2009	Alfie Flits	7	Brian Hughes	Alan Swinbank
2010	Peddlers Cross	5	Jason Maguire	Donald McCain, Jr.
2011	Abandoned due to frost
2012	Cinders And Ashes	5	Jason Maguire	Donald McCain, Jr.
2013	Abandoned due to snow
2014	Zamdy Man	5	Aidan Coleman	Venetia Williams
2015	Aso	5	Liam Treadwell	Venetia Williams
2016	Its'afreebee	6	Harry Skelton	Dan Skelton
2017	Neon Wolf	6	Noel Fehily	Harry Fry
2018	First Flow	6	David Bass	Kim Bailey
2019	Mister Fisher	5	James Bowen	Nicky Henderson
2020	Stolen Silver	5	Sam Twiston-Davies	Nigel Twiston-Davies
2021	Faivoir	6	Bridget Andrews	Dan Skelton
2022	Jonbon	6	Aidan Coleman	Nicky Henderson
2023	Abandoned due to frost
2024 (Note: The 2024 race was switched from Haydock Park to Doncaster after the original fixture was abandoned due to frost.)	Jeriko Du Reponet	5	Mark Walsh	Nicky Henderson
2025	Dedicated Hero	6	Ryan Mania	Sandy Thomson
2026	Old Park Star	6	Nico de Boinville	Nicky Henderson

== See also ==
- Horse racing in Great Britain
- List of British National Hunt races
