= 2007 Champion Hurdle =

77th Champion Hurdle
- Champion Hurdle
- Location: Cheltenham Racecourse
- Date: 13 March 2007
- Winning horse: Sublimity (FR)
- Jockey: Philip Carberry
- Trainer: John Carr (IRE)
- Owner: Bill Hennessy

The 2007 Champion Hurdle was a horse race held at Cheltenham Racecourse on Tuesday 13 March 2007. It was the 77th running of the Champion Hurdle.

The winner was Bill Hennessy's Sublimity, a seven-year-old gelding trained in Ireland by John Carr and ridden by Philip Carberry. The victory was the first in the race, for owner, trainer and jockey.

Sublimity won at odds of 16/1 by three lengths from the previous season's winner Brave Inca. The field also included Hardy Eustace, the winner of the race in 2004 and 2005. Eight of the ten runners completed the course.

== Race details ==
- Sponsor: Smurfit Kappa
- Purse: £350,000; First prize: £205,272
- Going: Soft
- Distance: 2 miles 110 yards
- Number of runners: 10
- Winner's time: 3m 55.70

== Full result ==
Pos.	Marg.	Horse (bred)	Age	Jockey	Trainer (Country)	Odds
1		Sublimity (FR)	7	Philip Carberry	John Carr (IRE)	16/1
2	3	Brave Inca (IRE)	9	Ruby Walsh	Colm Murphy (IRE)	11/2
3	nk	Afsoun (FR)	5	Mick Fitzgerald	Nicky Henderson (GB)	28/1
4	nk	Hardy Eustace (IRE)	10	Conor O'Dwyer	Dessie Hughes (IRE)	3/1
5	15	Kawagino (IRE)	7	Wayne Kavanagh	Seamus Mullins (GB)	100/1
6	hd	Detroit City (USA)	5	Richard Johnson	Philip Hobbs (GB)	6/4 fav
7	¾	Asian Maze (IRE)	8	Robbie Power	Thomas Mullins (IRE)	20/1
8	dist	Marble Garden (USA)	6	James Davies	R Chotard (FR)	250/1
Fell		Iktitaf (IRE)	6	Barry Geraghty	Noel Meade (IRE)	16/1
PU		Straw Bear (USA)	6	A. P. McCoy	Nick Gifford (GB)	7/1

- Abbreviations: nse = nose; nk = neck; hd = head; dist = distance; UR = unseated rider; PU = pulled up

== Winner's details ==
Further details of the winner, Sublimity

- Sex: Gelding
- Foaled: 23 April 2000
- Country: France
- Sire: Selkirk; Dam: Fig Tree Drive (Miswaki)
- Owner: Bill Hennessy
- Breeder: Stratford Place & Watership Down Stud
