= Lanzarote Hurdle =

Hurdle horse race in Britain

Lanzarote Hurdle
2026
Iberico Lord	Double Powerful	A Pai De Nom

Previous years
2024
Jay Jay Reilly	Nemean Lion	Impose Toi
2023
West Balboa	Red Risk	Up For Parol
2022
Cobblers Dream	Highway One O Two	Call Me Lord
2021
Boreham Bill	Misty Whisky	Hunters Call

2020-2011
2020
Burrows Edge	Vive Le Roi	Echiquier
2019
Big Time Dancer	Solomon Grey	Lord Napier
2018
William Henry	Spiritofthegames	Red Indian
2017
Modus	Templeross	Lord of the Island
2016
Yala Enki	Westren Warrior	Ibis Du Rheu
2015
Tea For Two	Little Boy Boru	Saffron Wells
2014
Saphir Du Rheu	If in Doubt	Like Minded
2013
Oscara Dara	Romeo Americo	Buck Magic
2012
Swincombe Flame	Featherbed Lane	Act of Kalanisi
2011
James De Vassy	Organisateur	Palomar

2010-2001
2010
Micheal Flips	Duc De Regniere	Gee Dee Nen
2008
Nycteos	Kawagino	Lyes Green
2007
Verasi	Royals Darling	Afrad
2006
Rayshan	Buck Whaley	Torkinking
2005
Crossbow Creek	Torrid Kentavr	McBain
2004
Limerick Boy	Perouse	Greenhope
2003
Non So	Hawadeth	Miss Cool
2002
Majlis	Copeland	Tysou

2000-1992
2000
Heart	Ferrers	Miss Fara
1999
Tiutchev	Mister Rm	Serenus
1998
Shahrur	Alabang	Carlito Brigante
1997
Make A Stand	Gales Cavalier	Silver Groom
1996
Warm Spell	Frickley	Thinking Twice
1995
Trying Again	Keep Me in Mind	Daring Past
1994
Nijmegen	High Baron	Fatack
1993
Tomahawk	Nijmegen	Avro Anson
1992
Egypt Mill Prince	Jungle Knife	Sartorius

The Lanzarote Hurdle is a National Hunt hurdle race in Great Britain which is open to horses aged four years or older. It is run at Kempton Park over a distance of about 2 miles and 5 furlongs (4,225 metres), and during its running there are ten hurdles to be jumped. It is a handicap race, and it is scheduled to take place each year in January.

The event is named in memory of the racehorse Lanzarote (1968–1977), the winner of the Champion Hurdle in 1974, and was first run in 1978. Lanzarote had a particularly good record in races at Kempton, and he twice won the track's leading hurdle event, the Christmas Hurdle. He finished his hurdling career with a total of 20 wins from 33 starts. After achieving a further three victories as a chaser, Lanzarote was made the second favourite to win the Cheltenham Gold Cup in 1977. However, during that race he broke his near-hind leg and had to be euthanised.

For many years the distance of the Lanzarote Hurdle was set at 2 miles (3,219 metres), and there were eight hurdles to be jumped. The event was temporarily switched to Carlisle in 2006, and upon its return to Kempton in 2007 there was a substantial increase to its distance. Its regular length was extended by 5 furlongs (1,006 metres), and there were an additional two hurdles to jump. In its analysis of that year's running, the Racing Post commented that this was: "In effect, a new race. Although run under the 'Lanzarote' handle, this was in no way the same race as the Lanzarote of old." Prior to 2023 the race had Listed status. This was removed when Listed handicap races were removed from the racing programme, and the race became a Class 2 handicap.

== Winners ==
- Weights given in stones and pounds.

Year	Winner	Age	Weight	Jockey	Trainer
1978	Nougat	8	11-11	Gerry Enright	Josh Gifford
1979	Love From Verona	5	10-01	Ray Cochrane	Ron Sheather
1980	Danish King	6	10-03	Andrew Turnell	Bob Turnell
1981	Walnut Wonder	6	10-06	Anthony Webber	Les Kennard
1982	Knighthood	7	10-00	Steve Knight	Bob Turnell
1983	Brave Hussar	5	10-07	Richard Rowe	Josh Gifford
1984	Janus	6	11-01	Colin Brown	Dina Smith
1985	Abandoned due to frost and snow
1986	Prideaux Boy	8	11-00	Michael Bowlby	Graham Roach
1987	Stray Shot	9	09-10	Gee Armytage (Note: amateur jockey)	Geoff Hubbard
1988	Fredcoteri	12	11-04	Micky Hammond	George M. Moore
1989	Grey Salute	6	10-07	Richard Dunwoody	John Jenkins
1990	Atlaal	5	10-03	Richard Dunwoody	John Jenkins
1991	Star Season	7	10-03	Nick Mann	Richard Holder
1992	Egypt Mill Prince	6	10-13	Mark Pitman	Jenny Pitman
1993	Tomahawk	6	10-00	Declan Murphy	Pat Murphy
1994	Nijmegen	6	10-06	Jamie Osborne	Jimmy FitzGerald
1995	Trying Again	7	11-10	Jamie Osborne	David Gandolfo
1996	Warm Spell	6	11-02	Tony McCoy	Gary L. Moore
1997	Make A Stand	6	10-03	Tony McCoy	Martin Pipe
1998	Shahrur	5	10-09	John Kavanagh	Gary L. Moore
1999	Tiutchev	6	11-02	Mick Fitzgerald	David Nicholson
2000	Heart	7	10-06	Carl Rafter	Henrietta Knight
2001	Abandoned due to frost
2002	Majlis	5	10-03	David Dennis	Tom George
2003	Non So	5	11-05	J. P. McNamara	Nicky Henderson
2004	Limerick Boy	6	11-07	Sam Thomas	Venetia Williams
2005	Crossbow Creek	7	10-08	Jim Crowley	Mark Rimell
2006 (Note: The race was switched to Carlisle in 2006 as Kempton was closed for redevelopment)(dh)	Rayshan; Buck Whaley	6; 6	10-07; 10-06	Rose Davidson; Noel Fehily	Nicky Richards; Jonjo O'Neill
2007	Verasi	6	10-04	Eamon Dehdashti	Gary L. Moore
2008	Nycteos	7	10-10	Ruby Walsh	Paul Nicholls
2009	Abandoned due to frost
2010	Micheal Flips	6	10-11	Nick Scholfield	Andrew Turnell
2011	James De Vassy	6	11-02	Will Kennedy	Nick Williams
2012	Swincombe Flame	6	10-04	Will Kennedy	Nick Williams
2013	Oscara Dara	8	11-00	Barry Geraghty	Nicky Henderson
2014	Saphir Du Rheu	5	11-07	Harry Derham	Paul Nicholls
2015	Tea For Two	6	09-12	Lizzie Kelly	Nick Williams
2016	Yala Enki	6	09-12	Charlie Deutsch	Venetia Williams
2017	Modus	7	11-04	Barry Geraghty	Paul Nicholls
2018	William Henry	8	11-07	James Bowen	Nicky Henderson
2019	Big Time Dancer	6	10-10	Jonjo O'Neill jr	Jennie Candlish
2020	Burrows Edge	7	11-04	Nico de Boinville	Nicky Henderson
2021	Boreham Bill	9	10-11	Ben Jones	Emma Lavelle
2022	Cobblers Dream	6	10-10	Jack Quinlan	Ben Case
2023	West Balboa	7	10-11	Bridget Andrews	Dan Skelton
2024	Jay Jay Reilly	8	11-00	Tristan Durrell	Dan Skelton
2025	Abandoned due to frost
2026	Iberico Lord	8	11-04	James Bowen	Nicky Henderson

== See also ==
- Horse racing in Great Britain
- List of British National Hunt races
