= Sayajirao =

British-bred Thoroughbred racehorse

- Sire: Nearco
- Grandsire: Pharos
- Dam: Rosy Legend
- Damsire: Dark Legend
- Sex: Stallion
- Foaled: 1944
- Country: Great Britain
- Colour: Bay
- Owner: HH Maharaja of Baroda
- Trainer: Sam Armstrong
- Record: 16: 6-6-2
- Earnings: US$55,594 (equivalent)

Major wins
- Lingfield Derby Trial (1947); Irish Derby Stakes (1947); Hardwicke Stakes (1948) British Classic Race wins: St. Leger Stakes (1947)

Honours
- Sayajirao locomotive #60530

Sayajirao (1944–1966) was a British Thoroughbred racehorse. A full brother to 1945 Epsom Derby winner, Dante, he was out of the mare Rosy Legend and sired by the great Nearco who is described by Thoroughbred Heritage as "one of the greatest racehorses of the Twentieth Century" and "one of the most important sires of the century." Nearco was not only unbeaten in racing, but also the patriarch of the most dominant sire line in Thoroughbred history.

== Overview ==
Sayajirao was purchased as a yearling by HH Maharaja of Baroda for what at the time was the very substantial sum of 28,000 guineas, the then equivalent of US$117,600.

Racing at age three, Sayajirao won the Lingfield Derby Trial and the Irish Derby Stakes. He ran third in both The Derby and the 2,000 Guineas Stakes then won the third leg of the English Triple Crown, the St. Leger Stakes at Doncaster Racecourse.

== As a sire ==
Retired to stud in 1949, Sayajirao sired the winners of 410 races. His daughters foaled the winners of 261 races. Among those he sired were:

- Dark Issue (b. 1952) - won the Irish 1,000 Guineas
- Gladness (b. 1953) - winner of the 1958 Ascot Gold Cup
- Lynchris (b. 1957) - Yorkshire Oaks, Irish Oaks, Irish St. Leger, Beresford Stakes
- Zenobia (b. 1957) - won the Irish 1,000 Guineas
- Indiana (b. 1961) - wins included St. Leger Stakes, Great Voltigeur Stakes, Chester Vase, Ormonde Stakes
- The Spaniard (b. 1962) - won the Scottish Grand National
- I Say (b.1962) - won the Coronation Cup and finished 3rd in the Epsom Derby to Sea Bird
