= Mares' Novices' Hurdle Finale =

Hurdle horse race in Britain

Mares' Novices' Hurdle Finale
2025
Siog Geal	La Pinsonniere	Pismo Beach

Previous years
2024
All The Glory	Alfie's Princess	Ooh Betty
2023
Ilovethenightlife	Blue Beach	Great Snow
2022
Largy	Nina The Terrier	Sabrina
2021
Bourbon Beauty	Marada	Lilly Pedlar

2020-2011
2019
Annie Mc	Sixty's Belle	Our Dot's Baby
2018
Roksana	Kalahari Queen	Jubilympics
2017
Snow Leopardess	Copper Kay	River Arrow
2016
Briery Queen	Lady of Lamanver	Antartica De Thaix
2015
Kalane	Hannah's Princess	Spartan Angel
2014
Run Ructions Run	The Pirate's Queen	Lily Waugh
2013
Polly Peachum	Call Me A Star	Miss Ballantyne
2012
Tante Sissi	Heather Royal	Lady Karabaya
2011
Line Freedom	Violin Davis	Shop Dj

2010-2003
2010
Ryde Back	Banjaxed Girl	Kerada
2009
Argento Luna	Ravello Bay	Dancingwithbubbles
2008
Jaunty Flight	Castlecrossings	Amber Brook
2007
Karello Bay	Miss Mitch	Very Special One
2006
Harringay	Jontys'lass	Vertical Bloom
2005
Penneyrose Bay	Early Start	Zaffaran Express
2004
Kentford Grebe	Material World	Supreme Serenade
2003
Ar Muin Na Muice	Glenmoss Tara	Blue Ride

The Mares' Novices' Hurdle Series Final is a Grade 2 National Hunt hurdle race in Great Britain which is open to mares and fillies aged four years or older. It is run at Newbury over a distance of about 2 miles and 4½ furlongs (2 miles, 4 furlongs and 118 yards, or 4,141 metres) and during its running there are 10 flights of hurdles to be jumped. The race is for novice hurdlers, and it is scheduled to take place each year in March. The race is a Limited Handicap and was awarded Grade 2 status in 2017.

== Winners ==
Year	Winner	Age	Weight	Jockey	Trainer
2003	Ar Muin Na Muice	7	11-10	Barry Geraghty	Jonjo O'Neill
2004	Kentford Grebe	5	10-07	Andrew Thornton	Seamus Mullins
2005	Penneyrose Bay	6	10-04	Seamus Durack	J A Geake
2006	Harringay	6	11-01	Timmy Murphy	Henrietta Knight
2007	Karello Bay	6	11-03	Mick Fitzgerald	Nicky Henderson
2008	Jaunty Flight	6	11-10	Aidan Coleman	Oliver Sherwood
2009	Argento Luna	6	11-00	Dominic Elsworth	Oliver Sherwood
2010	Ryde Back	6	10-12	David Bass	Nicky Henderson
2011	Line Freedom	6	11-05	Jeremiah McGrath	Nicky Henderson
2012	Tante Sissi	5	10-09	Robert Thornton	Alan King
2013	Polly Peachum	5	10-04	David Bass	Nicky Henderson
2014	Run Ructions Run	5	10-07	Dougie Costello	Tim Easterby
2015	Kalane	6	10-13	Noel Fehily	Charlie Longsdon
2016	Briery Queen (Note: Lady Of Lavanmer finished first in 2016 but was placed second after a stewards' enquiry)	7	11-00	Barry Geraghty	Noel Williams
2017	Snow Leopardess	5	11-01	Aidan Coleman	Charlie Longsdon
2018	Roksana	6	11-02	Bridget Andrews	Dan Skelton
2019	Annie Mc	5	11-05	Jonjo O'Neill jr	Jonjo O'Neill
	no race 2020 (Note: The 2020 running was cancelled because of the COVID-19 pandemic in the United Kingdom)
2021	Bourbon Beauty	6	10-06	Harry Bannister	Alex Hales
2022	Largy G	8	10-04	Tom O'Brien	Noel Williams
2023	Ilovethenightlife	5	11-12	Brendan Powell	Joe Tizzard
2024	All The Glory	7	11-03	Jonjo O'Neill jr	Jonjo O'Neill
2025	Siog Geal	6	11-03	Jonathan Burke	Fergal O'Brien

== See also ==
- Horse racing in Great Britain
- List of British National Hunt races
