= Earth Summit (disambiguation) =

The Earth Summit is a major United Nations conference held in Rio de Janeiro from June 3 to June 14, 1992.

Earth Summit may also refer to:

- Earth Summit (horse), a National Hunt racehorse
- Earth Summit 2002, a United Nations conference held in Johannesburg, South Africa
