= The Spaniard =

British-bred Thoroughbred racehorse

The Spaniard (foaled 1962) was a Thoroughbred gelding racehorse best known for winning the 1970 Scottish Grand National. Out of the mare Perle d'Espagne, he was sired by Sayajirao whose wins included the Irish Derby and St. Leger Stakes,

The Spaniard was trained by Ken Oliver, who won a record five editions of the Scottish Grand National and owned by W. T. Rimmer of Creiff, Scotland.
