= Sublimity (horse) =

French-bred Thoroughbred racehorse

- Sublimity and jockey Philip Carberry at the 2009 WBX Fighting Fifth Hurdle
- Sire: Selkirk
- Grandsire: Sharpen Up
- Dam: Fig Tree Drive
- Damsire: Miswaki
- Sex: Gelding
- Foaled: 2000
- Country: Ireland
- Colour: Bay
- Breeder: Stratford Place/ Watership Down Stud
- Owner: Saeed Suhail; Bill Hennessy
- Trainer: Sir Michael Stoute; John Carr; Robert Alan Hennessy
- Record: 40: 10-2-4
- Earnings: £425,974

Major wins
- Champion Hurdle (2007); December Festival Hurdle (2008); Listed Alleged Stakes at the Curragh (2005); Doncaster Mile Stakes (2004)
- Last updated on 29 June 2009

Sublimity (foaled 23 April 2000) was an Irish Thoroughbred racehorse whose Flat racing and hurdling career was highlighted in 2007 when he won the Champion Hurdle at the Cheltenham Festival. By Selkirk and out of Fig Tree Drive, Sublimity is owned by the late Bill Hennessy and trained by veteran trainer John G Carr in Killeaney Stagoes, Maynooth in Ireland.

== Background ==
Charlie Gordon-Watson Bloodstock, acting for racehorse owner Saeed Suhail, purchased Sublimity as a yearling from the Tattersalls October Sales in 2001 for 210,000 Guineas. After his sale Sublimity was sent to be trained by Sir Michael Stoute at Newmarket.

At the age of three Sublimity finished fourth under Kieren Fallon in a males-only maiden race at Newmarket on his racecourse debut and went on to win his next two outings; beating the Marcus Tregoning-trained Fatik over one mile at York, and beating stablemate Adekshan over the same distance at Newmarket.

Sublimity ended his first season with a fourth place in the Listed Hampton Court Stakes at Royal Ascot behind the Johnny Murtagh-ridden Persian Majesty and another fourth in the Listed Ben Marshall Stakes at Newmarket, behind Babodana.

== On the Flat ==
The following year Sublimity remained in training with Sir Michael Stoute and kicked off his season at the first Flat meeting of the year, Doncaster's Brocklesby Stakes card.

Sublimity had progressed with every run in his debut season, but had it all to do on paper in the Listed Doncaster Mile Stakes. However, ridden for the first time by Johnny Murtagh, the four-year-old won convincingly, beating the Mark Johnston-trained Gateman, who went on to Group 3 glory.

Group company therefore beckoned for the rising star and Stoute wasted no time, entering Sublimity for a Group 2 over a mile at Sandown on the Bet365 Gold Cup day, British jump racing's seasonal finale. Unfortunately Sublimity proved not quite up to the task and finished seventh, beaten even by Babodana, who finished a short head ahead of him in sixth.

Back in Listed company next time out, Sublimity finished fourth, but it was clear that Stoute's miler could no longer keep pace and that October he returned to Tattersalls

== Joining John Carr ==
As Sublimity walked into the ring, trainer John Carr was on his way out but Robert Alan Hennessy, son of one of his top owner's Bill Hennessy wanted to have a go . Hennessy had wanted to buy Essex the previous year at the same sale but had been put off by a colleague and was forced to watch the useful Flat racing performer go on to finish third in the Grade 1 Punchestown Champion Four Year Old Hurdle; he didn't want to make the same mistake twice, despite Carr's fears that the price would got too high because of Sublimity's good form. So they went back in the sales ring and the gavel fell at only 32,000 Guineas.

They had him wind-tested, but the vets weren’t happy, so they wanted to gallop him the following morning and then test his wind again. If he failed, they could give him back, if he passed they had to keep him. That evening, Hennessy was out in Newmarket and trainer Shane Donohoe, among others, warned him that he had heard the horse had more than just bad breathing. This left Hennessy hoping he would fail his wind test but he passed and both Hennessy and Carr returned to Ireland distraught with their purchase.

It would come back to haunt Hennessy later but Sublimity showed no signs of any ailments on his first start from John Carr's base in Maynooth, County Kildare, dropping his customary hold-up tactics and making all of the running, on rain-softened ground he wouldn't have liked, to win the 2005 Listed Alleged Stakes at the Curragh back in the hands of Johnny Murtagh. That was to prove his last win on the Flat as the same December he switched to hurdling.

== Early hurdling days ==
With sire Selkirk being a confirmed champion miler and dam Fig Tree Drive coming from a long line of miler's it seemed unlikely that Sublimity, who had never run over further than one mile and two furlongs, would be able to last the minimum hurdling trip of two miles, particularly on the testing ground common at Irish racecourses, but nobody told him that.

Partnered by Philip Carberry, younger brother of Paul Carberry, Sublimity annihilated an 18-runner field of highly regarded types by five lengths on his hurdling debut at Leopardstown and bookmakers quickly priced him up at around 14-1 for the following year's novice hurdling crown at the Cheltenham Festival, the Supreme Novices' Hurdle. Illness was blamed for his disappointment in a Grade 2 at Punchestown the following February and in March he boarded the boat for Prestbury Park.

The 2006 Cheltenham Festival opened under overcast skies and on ground that lacked its usual lush grass cover due to the unhelpful weather of the preceding weeks, nevertheless the ground was deemed suitable for Sublimity and himself and Philip Carberry lined up for the curtain-raising Supreme Novices' Hurdle. As the tape went up Buena Vista quickly jumped to the fore but set a steady pace and many in behind raced freely. Still, Sublimity travelled well and began to make headway through the talented field with half the race left to run. However at this point Pablo Du Charmil, who had lost his rider, Rodi Greene, at the third hurdle, came across his path and stopped him in his tracks. He came quickly back on the bridle and proceeded to run a huge race, finishing fourth, three and a half lengths behind the winner, Noland.

Continuing the trend Sublimity finished his first hurdling season with fourth place in the Punchestown Champion Novice Hurdle.

== The Champion Hurdle ==
Sublimity had proven his class, maybe not on the racecourse, but certainly to those who knew him best, trainer John Carr, work-rider Robert Hennessy and groom Majella Brennan. He had given Bill Hennessy a great thrill at Cheltenham and the Dublin innkeeper wanted more, so Carr plotted what others called mission impossible.

With his dodgy breathing it was vital that Sublimity was not run often and always run on the best ground so instead of aiming their star at a traditional route to the Champion Hurdle the ex-Flat performer had his preparation at Navan, in a lowly hurdle race, which he duly won by 20 lengths. Carr then kept his fragile charge under wraps until March.

Despite Carr's efforts to keep Sublimity's potential secret, many, including top Irish pundit David Duggan, had been very impressed with his Supreme Novices' Hurdle fourth and, having been as large as 100-1 ante-post, he was sent off at 16-1. Still, he was an outsider, and the pressure was off big-race jockey Philip Carberry.

Settling his mount at the back of the field Carberry waited while dual-winner Hardy Eustace set a strong pace up front. 2006 winner Brave Inca cruised up to join the leader at the half way stage and a battle commenced. The pair drew away from the field and were neck and neck at the penultimate hurdle but stalking ominously in behind was Sublimity and as Hardy Eustace and Brave Inca fought, Carberry cantered into the lead at the final hurdle and went away beating Brave Inca into 2nd by 3L.

Niggling health problems had plagued Sublimity throughout the 2006/07 season but somehow everything fell right on the day. Next season the struggle with his health and the bad Irish racing ground was lost and he finished winless, although did record a fourth in the Champion Hurdle and would possibly have beaten Punjabi in the Punchestown Champion Hurdle had Barry Geraghty not got first run on the Nicky Henderson-trained stalwart.

== Family affair ==
Bill Hennessy had given his son Robert plenty of rides when he was a jockey, and the rider had played a huge role in Sublimity's career since spotting him at Tattersalls in October 2004, so when he suggested he would embark on fulfilling his lifelong ambition to train racehorses, Bill and John Carr, agreed it was in Sublimity's and Robert's best interests if the rookie took over his training.

Robert rented a small facility with a round sand gallop, around 20 stables, a few paddocks and an outdoor ring only a few minutes from his home in Ratoath, County Meath. There he prepared Sublimity for his first run in the Fighting Fifth Hurdle at Newcastle. However, as the date approached regular rider Philip Carberry suffered a fall and broke his collarbone ruling him out of the Grade 1 and Hennessy still did not have a licence to train. Luckily he was granted a permit to train in the nick of time and Sublimity was declared, as his very first runner, for the Fighting Fifth Hurdle.

Majella Brennan, who left John Carr's with Sublimity to become Robert's assistant, accompanied her charge across to England and Hennessy joined her on that Saturday but unfortunately the meeting was abandoned due to frost and they were forced to wait a week. The team travelled back to Ratoath and returned to Wetherby, where the race had been transferred to, days later.

Despite the excessive travelling, Sublimity finished second to Punjabi and dreams of further Champion Hurdle glory arose. Next on the cards was the Grade 1 December Festival Hurdle at Leopardstown. The ground dried out in just in time and, in front of most of the Hennessy family, Sublimity made Robert the first trainer to land his very first success in a Grade 1 hurdle. All roads led to Cheltenham after that but the weather had other ideas and after a disappointing run on soft ground back at Leopardstown for the Irish Champion Hurdle, Sublimity finished well down the field on even worse ground in the Champion Hurdle.

Before that Hennessy had banked on suitable ground playing into the hands of Sublimity in the Punchestown Champion Hurdle, but Carberry reported that the gelding could not breathe for most of the Cheltenham championship and he was forced to shelve those plans. However hope came in the shape of vet Ben Brain, a breathing specialist, who jetted into Ratoath and performed a simple operation that would heal in plenty of time for Punchestown. Excitement built as the race approached, but again the weather turned.

== New lease of life ==
Robert Hennessy still needed to see whether Ben Brain's operation had worked so Sublimity was switched to the Flat again for the Listed Saval Beg Stakes at Leopardstown. He ran brilliantly, just failing to see out the one mile and four furlong trip and finishing third.

Sublimity kicked off his 2009/10 season at Newcastle, as he had the year before, in the Fighting Fifth Hurdle and finished second, this time to the 2009 Supreme Novices' Hurdle winner Go Native. With that rival heading off to Kempton for the Christmas Hurdle, Sublimity headed back to Leopardstown to bid for back-to-back wins in the December Festival Hurdle. The ground came up too testing and despite travelling best of all, he was beaten by soft-going specialist Solwhit.

He won his next race at Cork 11/10 beating Newmill into 2nd by 1/2L. Sublimity at 25/1 contested the Irish Champion Hurdle back at Leopardstown on 23 January 2010 and finished last of 5 behind Hurricane Fly 4/9f. He went on to run twice more and was retired after his final run at Punchestown on 25 May 2011 to conclude an extraordinary career.

== Race results ==
- Racing Post
  - 15 April 2003, 14 May 2003, 30 May 2003, 19 June 2003, 1 November 2003, 25 March 2004, 24 April 2004, 20 May 2004, 5 June 2004, 31 July 2004, 12 August 2004, 3 April 2005, 24 April 2005, 8 June 2005, 28 December 2005, 5 February 2006, 14 March 2006, 25 April 2006, 27 January 2007, 13 March 2007, 15 December 2007, 11 March 2008, 25 April 2008, 6 December 2008, 29 December 2008, 25 January 2009, 10 March 2009, 28 May 2009, 28 November 2009, 29 December 2009

== Related links ==
- Racing Post Sublimity file
- Trainer Robbie Hennessy's blog on racingpost.com
- Sublimity's pedigree
- Dictionary.com definition of Sublimity
- Wiktionary definition of Sublimity
