= Rough Quest =

British-bred Thoroughbred racehorse

- Sire: Crash Course
- Grandsire: Busted
- Dam: Our Quest
- Damsire: Private Walk
- Sex: Gelding
- Foaled: 10 May 1986
- Country: Bay
- Colour: United Kingdom
- Breeder: Michael Healy
- Trainer: Terry Casey
- Record: 38: 8-11-4
- Earnings: £354,432

Honours
- National Hunt Handicap Chase (1995); Castlemartin Stud Handicap Chase (1995); Racing Post Chase (1996); Grand National (1996)

Rough Quest (10 May 1986 – 19 October 2016) was a Thoroughbred racehorse most famous for his victory in the 1996 Grand National at Aintree.

== Background ==
Rough Quest was a bay horse bred in England by Michael Healy. He was sired by Crash Course who won the Doncaster Cup and became a successful National Hunt stallion: his other progeny included Jodami, Esha Ness and Maid of Money (Irish Grand National). During his racing career he was trained by Terry Casey.

== Racing career ==
The horse went to Aintree in 1996 in very good form, having won the Racing Post Chase and finishing second in the recent Cheltenham Gold Cup with the result that the public made him race favourite at the off. Mick Fitzgerald took the ride to be the first favourite to win the race for fourteen years. However the race was most notable for a prolonged stewards' enquiry into the possibility that the winner had crossed the runner up Encore Un Peu on the run in. After the enquiry, the result was allowed to stand.

Rough Quest never fully recovered from his efforts and was found to have a muscle enzyme disorder, winning just one more race in his career, a hunter chase at Newbury in 1999 before being retired later that year.

== Grand National record ==
| Grand National | Position | Jockey | Age | Weight | SP | Distance |
|---|---|---|---|---|---|---|
| 1996 | 1st | Mick Fitzgerald | 10 | 10-7 | 7/1 F | Won by 1¼ lengths |
| 1998 | Pulled up before two out | Mick Fitzgerald | 12 | 11-4 | 11-1 | N/A |

== Pedigree ==
Pedigree of Rough Quest (IRE), bay gelding, 1986
| Sire Crash Course (GB) 1971 | Busted (GB); 1963 | Crepello | Donatello |
| Sire Crash Course (GB) 1971 | Busted (GB); 1963 | Crepello | Crepuscule |
| Sire Crash Course (GB) 1971 | Busted (GB); 1963 | Sans le Sou | Vimy |
| Sire Crash Course (GB) 1971 | Busted (GB); 1963 | Sans le Sou | Martial Loan |
| Sire Crash Course (GB) 1971 | Lucky Stream (GB); 1956 | Persian Gulf | Bahram |
| Sire Crash Course (GB) 1971 | Lucky Stream (GB); 1956 | Persian Gulf | Double Life |
| Sire Crash Course (GB) 1971 | Lucky Stream (GB); 1956 | Kypris | Victrix |
| Sire Crash Course (GB) 1971 | Lucky Stream (GB); 1956 | Kypris | Phinoola |
| Dam Our Quest (GB) 1980 | Private Walko (GB); 1967 | Pall Mall | Palestine |
| Dam Our Quest (GB) 1980 | Private Walko (GB); 1967 | Pall Mall | Malapert |
| Dam Our Quest (GB) 1980 | Private Walko (GB); 1967 | La Brigantine | Astrophel |
| Dam Our Quest (GB) 1980 | Private Walko (GB); 1967 | La Brigantine | Diaconesse |
| Dam Our Quest (GB) 1980 | Corda (GB) (GB); 1972 | Current Coin | Hook Money |
| Dam Our Quest (GB) 1980 | Corda (GB) (GB); 1972 | Current Coin | Frances |
| Dam Our Quest (GB) 1980 | Corda (GB) (GB); 1972 | Lama | Arctic Storm |
| Dam Our Quest (GB) 1980 | Corda (GB) (GB); 1972 | Lama | Goggles (Family: 11-a) |
