= Kitty's Light =

British-bred Thoroughbred racehorse

- Sire: Nathaniel
- Grandsire: Sadler's Wells
- Dam: Daraiyna
- Damsire: Refuse To Bend
- Sex: Gelding
- Foaled: 2016
- Country: Great Britain
- Colour: Bay
- Breeder: The Daraiyna Syndicate
- Owner: R J Bedford & All Stars Sports Racing
- Trainer: Christian Williams
- Record: 36: 7 - 6 - 5
- Earnings: £479,295

Major wins
- Eider Chase (2023); Scottish Grand National (2023); Bet365 Gold Cup (2023)

Kitty's Light (foaled 11 February 2016) is a British Thoroughbred racehorse who competes in National Hunt races. In 2023 he completed a rare double in winning the Scottish Grand National and, a week later, the Bet365 Gold Cup. He is trained by Christian Williams and ridden in most of his races by Jack Tudor.

== Background ==
Kitty's Light is a bay gelding with a white star. His dam, Daraiyna, was bred in France and finished third in her only race; his sire, Nathaniel, was bred in Ireland and won the 2011 King George VI and Queen Elizabeth Stakes. As a yearling, Kitty's Light was bought for 5000 guineas and sent into training with Christian Williams near Bridgend in South Wales.

== Racing career ==
=== 2019/20 season ===
Kitty's Light made his first appearance on a racecourse in October 2019, when he was unplaced in a bumper (National Hunt flat race) at Huntingdon.

=== 2020/21 season ===
In July 2020, the four-year-old raced three times over hurdles, his best result being a third at Southwell. He then won on his first outing over fences, a novice chase at Southwell on 4 August. Over the rest of the summer and autumn he ran in another four handicap chases, with two wins, a second and a third place, ridden by conditional jockey Jack Tudor, who would become his regular jockey. After a break of two months, he returned to the racecourse in early 2021, coming fourth and third in two bumpers at Lingfield. He was then unplaced in a handicap hurdle race before winning the Borders Handicap Chase at Kelso. His final race of the season was the Bet365 Gold Cup at Sandown Park on 24 April 2021. Starting at 9/1 in a field of sixteen, he was held up in the rear and in fifth place at the last fence. Putting in a strong challenge on the straight, he was hampered by favourite Enrilo who was drifting in the lead and he finished third, three-quarters of a length behind Enrilo and a short head behind Potterman. After a stewards' enquiry, Enrilo was demoted to third place, and Kitty's Light was given second place behind Potterman, although he was seen as having deserved to win the race.

=== 2021/2022 season ===
Kitty's Light raced eight times over the season without any wins. He achieved second place in four of his races, including the Grade 2 Charlie Hall Chase at Wetherby, the Coral Trophy Handicap Chase at Kempton Park and the Grade 3 Scottish Grand National at Ayr behind stable mate Win My Wings. The season ended with third place behind Hewick in the Bet365 Gold Cup at Sandown Park, in which he started favourite.

=== 2022/23 season ===
After five starts in which he did not get within 18 lengths of the winner, Kitty's Light achieved his first win for nearly two years when he beat The Galloping Bear by two-and-a-half lengths in the Eider Chase at Newcastle on 25 February 2023. After a break of two months, he started 4/1 joint favourite in the Scottish Grand National. Held up in midfield, he went into the lead two out and, in spite of a mistake at the last, went on strongly to win by three lengths from Coopers Cross. After the race jockey Jack Tudor said: "He's a legend. He's small and he's not a brilliant jumper and he's been trained to the absolute minute." It was an emotional win for his trainer, whose daughter had recently been diagnosed with leukaemia. Just a week after his victory at Ayr, Kitty's Light returned to the racecourse to complete a rare double in winning the Bet365 Chase at Sandown. The only other horse to win both races in the same year was Hot Weld in 2007.

=== 2023/24 season ===
Kitty's Light ran three times over hurdles and once over fences between October and December without success. After a break of two and half months he made his first appearance at the Cheltenham Festival, coming seventh in the Festival Trophy Handicap Chase. His 2023/24 campaign had been aimed at the 2024 Grand National at Aintree on 13 April, and he just managed to creep in at the bottom of the weights as number 34 in a field of 34 runners. Starting at 12/1, Kitty's Light raced in midfield, going third after 3 out and jumping the last up with the leaders, only to fade on the run-in. He finished in fifth place, ten and a half lengths behind winner I Am Maximus, and was the best-placed of the British-trained runners. His trainer said: ""It was wonderful to watch and we're very proud. A long way out he was travelling sweetly and jumping well... He's a wonderful horse and we're very lucky to have him". Jockey Jack Tudor said: ""He ran an unbelievable race and jumped really well. It was great fun. There were no hard-luck stories, he just wasn't quite good enough to win." Two weeks later he finished ninth of twenty runners in the bet365 Gold Cup.
