= Trabolgan =

Irish-bred Thoroughbred racehorse

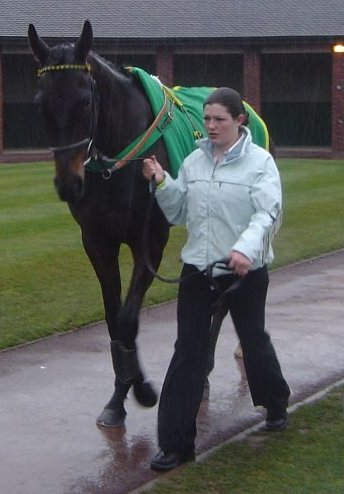
- Trabolgan in March 2005.
- Sire: King's Ride
- Grandsire: Rarity
- Dam: Derrella
- Damsire: Derrylin
- Sex: Gelding
- Foaled: 1 June 1998
- Country: Ireland
- Colour: Bay
- Breeder: Michael Lysaght
- Owner: Trevor Hemmings
- Trainer: Nicky Henderson
- Record: 17:5-5-0
- Earnings: £204,720

Major wins
- Royal & SunAlliance Chase (2005); Hennessy Cognac Gold Cup (2005)

Trabolgan (foaled 1 June 1998) is a retired, Irish-bred, British-trained Thoroughbred racehorse who competed in National Hunt racing. In a racing career which was seriously disrupted by injuries and other health problems, he won five times from seventeen starts between December 2002 and March 2010. After showing promising, but unremarkable form in his early career he showed great improvement when switched to steeplechasing in the autumn of 2004. In March 2005 at Cheltenham Racecourse he won the Grade I Royal & SunAlliance Chase, one of the season's most prestigious races for Novice chasers. On his next appearance in November 2005, he won the Hennessy Cognac Gold Cup under the biggest weights carried to victory in the race for twenty years. At the time, he was regarded as one of the best steeplechasers in training, but he never won again: he missed the next three years with injury and failed to recover his form when returning to the track.

== Background ==
Trabolgan is a dark-coated bay gelding bred in Ireland by Michael Lysaght. He was sired by King's Ride who won the Lincoln Handicap in 1980 before becoming a successful National Hunt stallion. His other progeny included Mister Morose (Aintree Hurdle), King's Curate (Stayers' Hurdle) and Kings Road (Hennessy Cognac Gold Cup). His dam, Derrella, was an unraced mare who also produced Huka Lodge, the winner of seven National Hunt races between 2004 and 2009.

In November 1999, the yearling was sent to the Tattersalls Ireland sale and was bought for 49,000 guineas by the British Bloodstock Agency. He entered the ownership of Trevor Hemmings and was sent into training with Nicky Henderson in Upper Lambourne in Berkshire.

== Racing career ==
=== 2002/2003 National Hunt season: National Hunt Flat races ===
Trabolgan began his racing career in National Hunt Flat races, also known as "bumpers" starting with an event at Uttoxeter Racecourse on 21 December, in which he was made 7/4 favourite and finished second, four lengths behind the winner, Plastic Paddy. After a break of two months, he returned in a similar event at Kempton Park Racecourse and started the 2/1 favourite against eighteen opponents. Ridden for the first time by Mick Fitzgerald he took the lead three furlongs from the finish but was caught in the closing stages and beaten a neck by Chelsea Bridge. Despite failing to win, the gelding was moved up sharply in class for the Grade I Champion Bumper on 12 March at the Cheltenham Festival. He started a 50/1 outsider and was ridden by Seamus Durack, with Fitzgerald partnering the Henderson stable's more fancied runner Back to Ben Alder. Trabolgan produced by far his best performance up to that time, moving up to challenge for the lead in the straight and finishing second by half a length to the Martin Pipe-trained favourite Liberman.

=== 2003/2004 National Hunt season: Novice Hurdles ===
In the 2003/2004 season, Trabolgan competed in Novice hurdle races, beginning at Aintree Racecourse in November where he started 11/8 favourite but fell at the sixth flight. The gelding recorded his first win at his fifth attempt when he won a minor novice's hurdle over two and a half miles at Ascot Racecourse on 19 December, winning "comfortably" by seven lengths at odds of 1/2. At Newbury Racecourse in January, Trabolgan started 2/5 favourite for a similar event and won easily by eight lengths from Noplanofaction. After the race, Henderson described the winner as "a lovely horse, a gorgeous horse and is still only a baby" before indicating that he would aim him at the Royal & SunAlliance Hurdle at the Cheltenham Festival. Trabolgan started favourite for a Novice's Hurdle at Market Rasen in February but was pulled up by Fitzgerald after only three hurdles and did not race again that season.

=== 2004/2005 National Hunt season: Novice Chases ===
Trabolgan began to compete in steeplechases in the following season, starting in a novices' event at Lingfield Park on 24 November. Fitzgerald moved the gelding up to dispute the lead three fences from the finish and Trabolgan drew clear of his opponents in the closing stages to win by two and a half lengths from Kadount. Trabolgan was then moved up in class and distance for the Grade I Feltham Novices' Chase over three miles at Kempton on Boxing Day. Over the last two fences, the nine-runner race developed into a struggle between Trabolgan and the 13/8 favourite Ollie Magern. Trabolgan overtook the favourite 150 yards from the finish, but Ollie Magern rallied to regain the lead in the final strides and won by a short head. Four weeks later, the gelding started favourite for a novices' chase at Haydock Park, but was no match for the French-bred Jazz d'Estruval, who won easily by nine lengths.

On 16 March, Trabolgan was ridden by Fitzgerald in the Grade I Royal & SunAlliance Chase over three miles at the Cheltenham Festival and started the 5/1 fourth choice in the betting behind Comply or Die, L'Ami (winner of the December Novices' Chase) and Cornish Rebel (younger brother of Best Mate). The other runners included the outstanding Irish mare Like-A-Butterfly. Trabolgan tracked Comply or Die for most of the race and recovered from a bad mistake at the second last fence to take the lead approaching the last. In the closing stages Trabolgan drew clear to win by three lengths from Comply or Die with Cornish Rebel a further three lengths back in third.

=== 2005/2006 National Hunt season: Steeplechases ===
Trabolgan began his 2005/2006 campaign on 26 November in the Hennessy Gold Cup, a handicap race over three and a quarter miles at Newbury, in which he was matched against more experienced chasers. He was assigned top weight of 166 pounds (11 stone 12 pounds) and started at odds of 13/2 in a field of nineteen runners. Mick Fitzgerald, who was returning from a long absence after suffering a serious neck injury, positioned the gelding just behind the leaders and maintained his position despite two bad jumping mistakes before moving up to challenge for the lead four fences from the finish. Trabolgan took the lead at the second last fence, held off the challenge of L'Ami, and pulled clear in the closing stages to win by two and a half lengths. The horse had carried the highest weight to victory since Burrough Hill Lad more than twenty years previously: the only other horses to have carried a higher weight had been Arkle and Mill House in the 1960s. Henderson, who was winning the race for the first time said: "It's taken me 25 years to do it. Mick struggled to get back and to do that is special for everybody".

Following his victory at Newbury, Trabolgan was regarded as a leading contender for the 2006 Cheltenham Gold Cup and was expected to reappear in the King George VI Chase at Kempton on Boxing Day. Shortly after his win, however, the gelding became lame and scans revealed a tendon injury. It was hoped that he would return in time for the Gold Cup but the injury proved more serious and he was ruled out for the rest of the season. At the time, Henderson described the decision to rest the horse as "precautionary more than anything and luckily he is a young horse with half his career still ahead of him".

=== Later career ===
Repeated injury problem meant that Trabolgan did not race again for more than three years. He returned as a ten-year-old, with Henderson expressing cautious optimism, but suffered from breathing problems and was unable to recover his old form. In December 2008 when he was pulled up two fences from the finish when tailed off in a handicap at Ascot. In his only other race that season he finished last of the six runners in the Levy Board Chase at Kempton in February.

Trabolgan ran three times without success in the 2009/2010 National Hunt season. He finished fourth in a handicap chase at Cheltenham in December when he jumped poorly and then unseated his rider, Barry Geraghty in a veterans' chase (restricted to horses of at least ten years of age) at Doncaster Racecourse in February. On 4 March he started favourite for a veterans' handicap at Newbury, but made several jumping errors and finished a distant fourth behind Eric's Charm.

On 23 March it was announced that Trabolgan would not race again and would be retired to Hemmings' property on the Isle of Man. Hemmings' racing manager said "We thought the sky was the limit after the Hennessy, but it was not to be. He's a beautiful horse and it was the obvious decision".

== Pedigree ==
Pedigree of Trabolgan (IRE), bay gelding, 1998
Sire King's Ride (IRE) 1976	Rarity (GB); 1967	Hethersett	Hugh Lupus
Sire King's Ride (IRE) 1976	Rarity (GB); 1967	Hethersett	Bride Elect
Sire King's Ride (IRE) 1976	Rarity (GB); 1967	Who Can Tell	Worden
Sire King's Ride (IRE) 1976	Rarity (GB); 1967	Who Can Tell	Javotte
Sire King's Ride (IRE) 1976	Ride (GB); 1966	Sovereign Path	Grey Sovereign
Sire King's Ride (IRE) 1976	Ride (GB); 1966	Sovereign Path	Mountain Path
Sire King's Ride (IRE) 1976	Ride (GB); 1966	Turf	Ballymoss
Sire King's Ride (IRE) 1976	Ride (GB); 1966	Turf	Wood Fire
Dam Derrella (IRE) 1985	Derrylin (GB); 1975	Derring-Do	Darius
Dam Derrella (IRE) 1985	Derrylin (GB); 1975	Derring-Do	Sipsey Bridge
Dam Derrella (IRE) 1985	Derrylin (GB); 1975	Antigua	Hyperion
Dam Derrella (IRE) 1985	Derrylin (GB); 1975	Antigua	Nassau
Dam Derrella (IRE) 1985	Kessella (GB); 1967	Le Levanstell	Le Lavandou
Dam Derrella (IRE) 1985	Kessella (GB); 1967	Le Levanstell	Stella's Sister
Dam Derrella (IRE) 1985	Kessella (GB); 1967	Kessaway	Honeyway
Dam Derrella (IRE) 1985	Kessella (GB); 1967	Kessaway	Kess (Family: 23)
