= Willsford =

British-bred Thoroughbred racehorse

- Sire: Beau Charmeur
- Grandsire: Le Fabuleux
- Dam: Wish Again
- Damsire: Three Wishes
- Sex: Gelding
- Foaled: 1983
- Country: United Kingdom
- Colour: Bay
- Breeder: William Roland Rothwell
- Owner: Arnold Kaplan, Robert Johnson and David Johnson
- Trainer: Jenny Pitman
- Record: 50: 14 - 5 - 7
- Earnings: £165,341

Major wins
- County Hurdle (1989); Midlands Grand National (1990); Eider Chase (1995); Scottish Grand National (1995)

Willsford (1983–1996) was a British Thoroughbred racehorse who was successful under National Hunt rules.

== Background ==
Willsford was owned by Arnold Kaplan, Robert Johnson and David Johnson and trained by Jenny Pitman. He was named after a block of flats where Robert and his wife, Janet, and Arnold and his wife, Kathy, all used to live together, Willsford Green in Edgbaston, Birmingham.

== Racing career ==
Willsford won the County Hurdle at the Cheltenham Festival as a six-year-old and was then moved up to steeplechases and won the Midlands Grand National at Uttoxeter in 1990.

In 1995, at the age of twelve, he became the oldest horse to win the Scottish Grand National.

Willsford had a heart attack and died in a race at Cheltenham Racecourse in November 1996.

There have been a few memorial races held for Willsford at Cheltenham Racecourse.

Willsford made one appearance in the Grand National, finishing 20th in 1992.
