= Bridget Andrews =

British jockey

Personal information
- Occupation: Jump Jockey
- Spouse: Harry Skelton (m. 2019)
- Children: 2

Horse racing career
- Sport: Horse racing

Significant horses
- Protektorat, Mohaayed, Faivoir

Bridget Andrews (born 1993) is an English National Hunt jockey. In 2018 she became the second professional female jockey to ride a winner at the Cheltenham Festival when she rode Mohaayed to victory in the County Handicap Hurdle. In 2023 she achieved her second festival win in the same race.

== Early life ==
Andrews grew up on the family farm in Bedfordshire where her parents, former jockeys Simon and Joanna, train point-to-pointers. Simon Andrews rode 170 point-to-point winners in his career, while Joanna rode nine winners in a shorter career. Simon Andrews also won the 1988 Foxhunters' Chase at Aintree on Newnham and the following year came tenth in the 1989 Grand National on the same horse. Bridget Andrew's older sister Gina and younger brother Jack are both amateur jockeys and have been ladies and mens champions in point-to-point. Gina Andrews also won the Fulke Walwyn Kim Muir Challenge Cup on Domesday Book at the 2017 Cheltenham festival. Andrews went pony racing before riding in point-to-points and taking the ladies championship title.

== Career ==
Andrews joined Dan Skelton’s Warwickshire yard as a conditional jockey in 2015. She scored her first Cheltenham Festival win on 16 March 2018 aboard the 33-1 outsider Mohaayed in the Grade 3 County Hurdle, only becoming the second female professional jockey to win at the festival, Lizzie Kelly having won the Ultima Handicap Chase earlier on the same day. Eleven female amateur jockeys had previously won 20 races at the festival. Eight days later, she achieved her first Grade 2 victory on Roksana in the Mares' Novices' Hurdle Finale at Newbury. There were two further Grade 2 victories in 2021, on Faivoir in the Rossington Main Novices' Hurdle at Haydock Park and on Protecktorat in the Many Clouds Chase at Aintree.

On 21 April 2022, racing at Warwick, Andrews had a fall from her horse, Dazzling Glory. She discovered two weeks later that ongoing soreness in her neck was because she had fractured three vertebrae. The injury led to a lengthy break from racing, but she returned to win the Lanzarote Hurdle on West Balboa at Kempton on 14 January 2023.

Andrews achieved her second Cheltenham festival win on 33-1 outsider Faivoir in the 2023 County Hurdle.

== Personal life ==
In 2019 Andrews married fellow jockey Harry Skelton, son of British show jumper and gold medal winning Olympian Nick Skelton and brother of trainer Dan Skelton for whom he rides as stable jockey. Andrews gave birth to a son, Rory, on 27 April 2024.

== Cheltenham Festival winners (2) ==
- County Handicap Hurdle - (2) Mohaayed (2018), Faivoir (2023)
