= Indiana (horse) =

Irish-bred Thoroughbred racehorse

- Sire: Sayajirao
- Grandsire: Nearco
- Dam: Willow Ann
- Damsire: Solario
- Sex: Stallion
- Foaled: 1961
- Country: Ireland
- Colour: Bay
- Breeder: F.F.Tuthill
- Owner: Charles W. Engelhard, Jr.
- Trainer: Jack Watts
- Record: 13:4-5-0

Major wins
- Chester Vase (1963); Great Voltigeur Stakes (1963); St. Leger Stakes (1964); Ormonde Stakes (1965)
- Last updated on July 26, 2008

Indiana (1961 – 14 June 1983) was an Irish-bred, British-trained Thoroughbred racehorse and sire. In a career which lasted from autumn 1963 until July 1965 he ran thirteen times and won four races. He won the Classic St Leger as a three-year-old in 1964, the same year in which he also won the Chester Vase and the Great Voltigeur Stakes. Indiana also finished second in The Derby and the Grand Prix de Paris. He retired from racing and was exported in 1966 to stand as a stallion in Japan. He died in 1983.

== Background ==
Indiana was a bay horse who stood 15.3 hands high bred in Ireland by F. F. Tuthill. He was sired by the St Leger winner Sayajirao out of the mare Willow Ann. Willow Ann never raced but was a success as a broodmare: in addition to Indiana, she also produced the Belmont Stakes winner Cavan. Indiana was a small and unprepossessing yearling and when he was sent to the Newmarket sales he has bought for 5,000 guineas by the London Bloodstock Agency on behalf of Charles Engelhard.

Engelhard sent the colt into training with Jack Watts at Newmarket.

== Racing career ==
=== 1963: two-year-old season ===
Indiana was slow to mature and ran only twice as a two-year-old. After finishing unplaced on his debut he finished second in the Clarence House Stakes at Ascot in September.

=== 1964: three-year-old season ===
Indiana made his seasonal debut in the Royal Stakes at Sandown in April, in which he finished second to Oncidium. In May, Indiana recorded his first win when taking the Chester Vase over one and a half miles at Chester Racecourse. He then finished unplaced behind Oncidium in the Lingfield Derby Trial, beaten eight lengths.

At Epsom, Indiana started a 33/1 outsider for the Derby, in afield of 17 runners, with the Irish colt Santa Claus being made 15/8 favourite. A crowd estimated at over 200,000, including the Queen and other members of the British royal family, was in attendance to view the most valuable race ever run in Britain. Ridden by Jimmy Lindley, Indiana was settled in the middle of the field before moving up into contention at Tattenham corner and taking the lead two furlongs from the finish. In the closing stages, Indiana was overtaken by Santa Claus, who challenged on the wide outside and finished second, beaten by a length. Shortly after his run at Epsom, Indiana was sent to France to contest the Grand Prix de Paris at Longchamp Racecourse where he finished second to White Label.

In August, Indiana won the Great Voltigeur Stakes at York winning by a head from Fighting Charlie, who went on to win two Ascot Gold Cups. In September, Indiana started at odds of 100/7 for the St Leger, in a field of fifteen runners which included Oncidium and White Label. Lindley settled Indiana behind the leading group before accelerating past the leader I Titan, two furlongs from the finish as other runners, including Oncidium, were hampered by a dog which ran onto the course. Indiana stayed on strongly to hold off the strong finish of the Irish filly Patti and win by a head.

=== 1965: four-year-old season ===
Indiana began his four-year-old season by winning the Ormonde Stakes at Chester. He finished second to Apprentice in the Yorkshire Cup and failed to reproduce his form in subsequent races, finishing unplaced in the Coronation Cup and the King George VI and Queen Elizabeth Stakes.

== Assessment ==
In their book A Century of Champions, John Randall and Tony Morris rated Indiana an "average" St Leger winner.

== Stud career ==
Indiana was exported to stand as a stallion in Japan. He sired the Japanese Horse of the Year Take Hope, who won the Japanese Derby in 1973 and the Spring Tenno Sho in 1974. He died in Japan on 14 June 1983.

== Pedigree ==
Pedigree of Indiana (IRE), bay stallion, 1961
Sire Sayajirao (GB)	Nearco	Pharos	Phalaris
Sire Sayajirao (GB)	Nearco	Pharos	Scapa Flow
Sire Sayajirao (GB)	Nearco	Nogara	Havresac
Sire Sayajirao (GB)	Nearco	Nogara	Catnip
Sire Sayajirao (GB)	Rosy Legend	Dark Legend	Dark Ronald
Sire Sayajirao (GB)	Rosy Legend	Dark Legend	Golden Legend
Sire Sayajirao (GB)	Rosy Legend	Rosy Cheeks	Saint Just
Sire Sayajirao (GB)	Rosy Legend	Rosy Cheeks	Purity
Dam Willow Ann (GB)	Solario	Gainsborough	Bayardo
Dam Willow Ann (GB)	Solario	Gainsborough	Rosedrop
Dam Willow Ann (GB)	Solario	Sun Worship	Sundridge
Dam Willow Ann (GB)	Solario	Sun Worship	Doctrine
Dam Willow Ann (GB)	Court of Appeal	Apelle	Sardanapale
Dam Willow Ann (GB)	Court of Appeal	Apelle	Angelina
Dam Willow Ann (GB)	Court of Appeal	Brown Princess	Tetratema
Dam Willow Ann (GB)	Court of Appeal	Brown Princess	Swagger Cane (Family 2-e)
