= Eider Chase =

Steeplechase horse race in Britain

Eider Chase
2026
Anglers Crag	Only The Bold	Red Delta

Previous years
2025
Knockanore	O'Connell	Passing Well
2024
Anglers Crag	Prince Des Fichaux	Tommie Beau
2023
Kitty's Light	The Galloping Bear	No Cruise Yet
2022
Win My Wings	Eclair Surf	Innisfree Lad
2021
Sam's Adventure	Crossley Tender	Salty Boy

2020-2011
2019
Crosspark	Mysteree	Morney Wing
2018
Baywing	West Of The Edge	Portrait King
2017
Mysteree	Knockanrawley	Shotgun Paddy
2016
Rocking Blues	Shotgun Paddy	Portrait King
2015
Milborough	Summery Justice	Woodford County
2014
Wyck Hill	Smoking Aces	Ballypatrick
2012
Portrait King	Posh Bird	Captain Americo
2011
Companero	Giles Cross	Morgan Be

2010-2001
2009
Merigo	Morgan Be	Rimsky
2008
Comply Or Die	Elvis Returns	Rimsky
2007
Nil Desperandum	Nine De Sivola	Chabrimal Minster
2006
Philson Run	High Cotton	Korelo
2004
Tyneandthyneagain	Robbo	Magical Bailiwick
2002
This Is Serious	Radiation	Ackzo
2001
Narrow Water	Scotton Green	Seven Towers

2000-1991
2000
Scotton Green	Ackzo	Full of Oats
1999
Hollybank Buck	Full of Oats	Feels Like Gold
1998
Domaine De Pron	Stormtracker	Samlee
1997
Seven Towers	Ivy House	Killeshin
1996
Killeshin	Silver Stick	Grange Brake
1995
Willsford	Dakyns Boy	Native Pride
1993
Into The Red	Ushers Island	Bluff Knoll
1992
David's Duky	Just So	Stay on Tracks

1990-1988
1990
Jelupe	The Langholm Dyer	Midnight Madness
1989
Polar Nomad	Calira	I Haventalight
1988
Star Of Screen	King Kanda	Bush Guide

The Eider Chase is National Hunt steeplechase in Great Britain. It is run at Newcastle Racecourse in February, over a distance of about three miles and six furlongs, although runnings up to and including 2026 were run over approximately 4m 1½f (4 miles, 1 furlong and 56 yards, or 6,690 metres).

The race was first run in 1952 and is seen as a trial for the Grand National. Comply or Die won both races in 2008, however, the 2004 winner, Tyneandthyneagain, was later fatally injured at Aintree. The 2011 race was run in extremely heavy ground, with only three horses completing the marathon.

== Winners ==
Year	Winner	Age	Weight	Jockey	Trainer
1952	Witty	7	09-08	G Slack	Charlie Hall
1953	Gigolo	8	11-07	A Moralee (Note: amateur jockey)	J Wight
1954	Gentle Moya	8	09-10	J Straker	Verley Bewicke
1955	Abandoned because of snow
1956	Abandoned because of snow and frost
1957	Wyndburgh	7	10-04	M Batchelor	P Wilkinson
1958	Wyndburgh	8	11-01	M Batchelor	P Wilkinson
1959	Turmoil	9	10-00	J Hudson	T Hudson
1960	Abandoned because of snow and frost
1961	Carmen IV	9	11-03	R Brewis	R Brewis
1962	Ballydar	9	10-10	Pat Buckley	Neville Crump
1963	Abandoned because of snow and frost
1964	Vice Regent	7	09-12	S Hayhurst	T Scott
1965	Pontin-Go	13	09–09	J Lehane	Bill Marshall
1966	Highland Wedding	9	10–11	Owen McNally	Toby Balding
1967	Highland Wedding	10	12–00	Owen McNally	Toby Balding
1968	Abandoned because of snow
1969	Highland Wedding	12	11–11	Bob Champion	Toby Balding
1970	China Cloed	7	09-10	P Ennis	Ken Oliver
1971	Abandoned because of waterlogged state of course
1972	Fair Vulgan	8	09-07	Maurice Barnes	Harry Bell
1973	Abandoned because of frost
1974	Scarlet Letch	9	10-04	P Mangan	R Brewis
1975	Abandoned because of waterlogged state of course
1976	Forest King	7	10-00	D Munro	K Hogg
1977	Set Point	9	11-11	D Munro	Lady Herries
1978	Abandoned because of snow and frost
1979	Abandoned because of snow and frost
1980	Abandoned because of waterlogged state of course
1981	Waggoners Walk	12	10-02	Robert Earnshaw	Miss C Mason
1982	Lasobany	9	10-00	Phil Tuck	Harry Bell
1983	Abandoned because of frost
1984	Lucky Vane	9	10–11	John Burke	Toby Balding
1985	Abandoned because of snow and frost
1986	Abandoned because of snow and frost
1987	Peaty Sandy	13	11-11	A Dudgeon	Helen Hamilton
1988	Star of Screen	8	10-07	Tom Morgan	John Edwards
1989	Polar Nomad	8	09-11	J O'Gorman	Arthur Stephenson
1990	Jelupe	8	10-00	Robin Sandys-Clarke	Robin Sandys-Clarke
1991	Abandoned due to snow
1992	David's Duky	10	09-07	K Hartnett	Andrew Reid
1993	Into The Red	9	10-01	Norman Williamson	John White
1994	Abandoned due to snow and frost
1995	Willsford	12	10-06	Peter Niven	Jenny Pitman
1996	Killeshin	10	09-11	Sean Curran	John Manners
1997	Seven Towers	8	11-08	Peter Niven	Mary Reveley
1998	Domaine De Pron	7	10-08	Robbie Supple	Lavinia Taylor
1999	Hollybank Buck	9	10–11	Francis Flood	Tony Martin
2000	Scotton Green	9	10-02	Lorcan Wyer	Tim Easterby
2001	Narrow Water	8	11-05	Adrian Maguire	Ferdy Murphy
2002	This Is Serious	8	11-02	Tony Dobbin	Charlie Swan
2003	Abandoned due to waterlogged state of course
2004	Tyneandthyneagain	9	11–12	Henry Oliver	Richard Guest
2005	Abandoned due to waterlogged state od course
2006	Philson Run	10	11-06	Graham Lee	Nick Williams
2007	Nil Desperandum	10	11–12	Tom Scudamore	Venetia Williams
2008	Comply Or Die	9	11–12	Timmy Murphy	David Pipe
2009	Merigo	8	11-01	Timmy Murphy	Alan Parker
2010	Abandoned due to snow
2011	Companero	11	11-00	Peter Buchanan	Howard Johnson
2012	Portrait King	7	11-08	Denis O'Regan	Maurice Phelan
2013	Abandoned due to snow
2014	Wyck Hill	10	11-00	Tom Scudamore	David Bridgwater
2015	Milborough	9	10-08	Graham Watters	Ian Duncan
2016	Rocking Blues	11	09-12	Lorcan Murtagh	Rose Dobbin
2017	Mysteree	9	11-00	Robbie Dunne	Michael Scudamore
2018	Baywing	9	11-00	Ryan Day	Nicky Richards
2019	Crosspark	9	10-13	Jamie Moore	Caroline Bailey
2020	Abandoned due to waterlogged state of the course
2021	Sam's Adventure	9	11-01	Henry Brooke	Brian Ellison
2022	Win My Wings	9	11-00	Ryan Mania	Christian Williams
2023	Kitty's Light	7	11-04	Jack Tudor	Christian Williams
2024	Anglers Crag	9	11-00	Henry Brooke	Brian Ellison
2025	Knockanore	8	10-04	Freddie Mitchell	Ryan Potter
2026	Anglers Crag	11	10-04	Danny McMenamin	Nicky Richards

== Sponsors ==
The Tote were long-term sponsors of the Eider Handicap Chase, sponsoring the race until their privatisation and subsequent takeover by Betfred. Betfred sponsored the race from 2012 until 2018 before Vertem began a five-year association with the race in 2019. In 2024 Betting.Bet were confirmed as the new race sponsor and the race is now run as the Betting.Bet Eider Handicap Chase.betting.bet - Betting.bet Confirmed as Eider Chase Day Sponsor

== See also ==
- Horse racing in Great Britain
- List of British National Hunt races
