= ASW Handicap Chase =

Discontinued steeplechase horse race in Britain

The ASW Handicap Chase was a National Hunt handicap chase in England which was open to horses aged five years and older.

It was run at Cheltenham over a distance of 4 miles and 1 furlong (6,637 metres), and was scheduled to take place each year on New Year's Day.

The race was first run in 1928 as the Stayers' Handicap Chase during the final week of December. It was renamed the Fred Withington Handicap Chase in 1952. From 1975 the race was sponsored by Bass and then later by Food Brokers Ltd and Intasun.

From 1998 the race was known as the Miles Gosling Handicap, after a previous chairman of Cheltenham Racecourse who died in 1997, aged 69.

== Winners ==
Year	Winner	Age	Weight	Jockey	Trainer
1928	Indian Lady	11	10-05	James Mason	Walter Easterby
1929	Delarue	7	10-08	Jack Moloney	George Beeby
1930	Aspirant	7	9-12	Keith Piggott	F G Cox
1931	Vinicole	7	10-11	Danny Morgan	Ivor Anthony
1932	Society	6	10-09	Geoffrey P Shakerley	F Brown
1933	Francolino	7	9-11	Patrick Fitzgerald	J C Cockton
1934	Really True	10	12-03	Frank Furlong	Major Noel Furlong
1935	Moorland View	9	9-10	Gerry Wilson	J C Cockton
1936	Carefree	5	11-11	Gerry Wilson	P Thrale
1937	Red Knight II	8	10-03	Davy Jones	E T Hunt
1938	St George II	9	11-01	Bobby Petre	A B Briscoe
	no race 1939-41
1942 Jan	Irish Duke	8	9-13	Jack Dowdeswell	J Vincenzi
	no race 1943-44
1945	Abandoned due to frost
1946	Bricett	9	12-00	Tim Molony	Charlie Hall
1947	Weevil	8	11-11	Johnnie Gilbert	T Farmer
1948	Soda II	7	10-10	Robert Bates	John Goldsmith
1949	Angel Hill	9	10-00	Len Stephens	Gerald Wilson
1950	Mighty Fine	8	12-00	Johnny Bullock	Fred Rimell
1951	Pearly Prince	8	10-07	Derek Leslie	A E L Boulter
1952	Gigolo	7	10-07	Dick Curran	J Wight
1953	Irish Lizard	10	10-10	Michael Scudamore	Frenchie Nicholson
1954	Irish Lizard	11	10-10	Michael Scudamore	Frenchie Nicholson
1955	Must	7	10-05	Bert Morrow	A Kilpatrick
1957 Jan	Henry Purcell	10	10-04	Ray Richards	E Smith
1957 Dec	Polar Flight	7	11-04	George Slack	G Spann
1958	The Bell	7	10-09	Brian Lawrence	T Yates
1959	Clover Bud	9	09-08	Stan Mellor	G Llewellin
1960	Vivant	7	10-01	Rex Hamey	Arthur Stephenson
1961	Abandoned because of snow and frost
1962	Abandoned because of frost
1964	Pappageno's Cottage	9	11-09	John Haldane	Ken Oliver
1965	Pappageno's Cottage	10	11-10	Terry Biddlecombe	Ken Oliver
1966	Mr Wonderful	10	10-03	Ron Vibert	Tim Forster
1967	Abandoned because of frost
1968	Abandoned because of foot and mouth epidemic
1969	Abandoned because of frost
1970	Abandoned because of frost
1971	Abandoned because of frost
1972	The Ghost	7	10-00	Andy Turnell	V Cross
1973	The Spaniard	11	11-01	Nicky Richards (Note: amateur jockey)	Gordon W. Richards
1974	Meridian II	7	09-07	Colin Tinkler	Ken Oliver
1975	Junior Partner	8	10-05	John Burke	Fred Rimell
1976	Jolly's Clump	10	10-03	Ian Watkinson	Harry Thomson Jones
1977	Gay Vulgan	9	10-07	Mark Floyd	Fulke Walwyn
1978	Prince Rock	10	10–12	Ian Watkinson	Peter Bailey
1979	Abandoned because of snow
1980	Abandoned because of frost
1981	Martinstown	9	11-03	Malcolm Batters	Mrs M Easton
1982	Pillager	7	10-01	Chris Kinane	Josh Gifford
1983	Bonum Omen	9	10-13	Kevin Mooney	Fulke Walwyn
1984	Solihull Sport	10	10-04	Anthony Webber	John Spearing
1985	Lucky Vane	10	11-07	John Burke	Toby Balding
1986 Jan	Knock Hill	10	10-01	George Mernagh	John Webber
1986 Dec	Knock Hil	10	10-10	George Mernagh	John Webber
1988	Memberson	10	10–12	Robert Bellamy	Peter Dufosee
1989	Knock Hill	13	11-05	George Mernagh	John Webber
1990	Bigsun	9	10–12	Richard Dunwoody	David Nicholson
1991	Seagram	11	10-01	Nigel Hawke	David Barons
1992	Rubika	9	10-03	Anthony Tory	Stan Mellor
1993	Abandoned due to frost
1994	Moorcroft Boy	9	10–12	Adrian Maguire	David Nicholson
1995	Abandoned due to frost
1996	Abandoned due to frost
1997	Abandoned due to frost
1998	Kendal Cavalier	8	10-00	Darren Salter	Rod Millman
1999	Baronet	9	11-04	Adrian Maguire	David Nicholson
2000	Kingdom of Shades	10	10–11	Norman Williamson	Venetia Williams
2001	Abandoned due to frost
2002	Abandoned due to frost
2003	Sir Frosty	10	10-10	Timmy Murphy	B J M Ryall
2004	Bear on Board	9	11-04	Robert Thornton	Alan King

== See also ==
- Horse racing in Great Britain
- List of British National Hunt races
