= County Handicap Hurdle =

Hurdle horse race in Britain

- Class: Premier Handicap
- Location: Cheltenham Racecourse; Cheltenham, England
- Inaugurated: 1920
- Race type: Hurdle race
- Sponsor: William Hill (2025) Boylesports (2026)
- Website: Cheltenham

Race information
- Distance: 2m 179y (3,382 metres)
- Surface: Turf
- Track: Left-handed
- Qualification: Five-years-old and up
- Weight: Handicap
- Purse: £100,000 (2023); 1st: £56,270

County Handicap Hurdle
2026
Wilful	Sticktotheplan	Joyeuse

Previous years
2025
Kargese	Ndaawi	Absurde
2024
Absurde	L'eau Du Sud	Pied Piper
2023
Faivoir	Pied Piper	Filey Bay
2022
State Man	First Street	Colonel Mustard
2021
Belfast Banter	Petit Mouchoir	Milkwood

2020-2011
2020
Saint Roi	Aramon	Embittered
2019
Ch'tibello	We Have A Dream	Countister
2018
Mohaayed	Remiluc	Whiskey Sour
2017
Arctic Fire	L'Ami Serge	Ozzie The Oscar
2016
Superb Story	Fethard Player	Sternrubin
2015
Wicklow Brave	Sort It Out	Quick Jack
2014
Lac Fontana	Arctic Fire	Montbazon
2013
Ted Veale	Tennis Cap	Manyriverstocross
2012
Alderwood	Edgardo Sol	Sailors Warn
2011
Final Approach	Get Me Out of Here	Nearby

2010-2001
2010
Thousand Stars	Arcalis	Dee Ee Williams
2009
American Trilogy	Stradbrook	Cockney Trucker
2008
Silver Jaro	Psycho	French Saulaie
2007
Pedrobob	Ouninpohja	Premier Dane
2006
Desert Quest	Noble Request	Adamant Approach
2005
Fontanesi	Stance	Borora
2004
Sporazene	Hawadeth	Copeland
2003
Spirit Leader	Balapour	Through The Rye
2002
Rooster Booster	Landing Light	Geos

2000-1991
2000
Master Tern	Danegold	Spokesman
1999
Sir Talbot	Decoupage	Toto Toscato
1998
Blowing Wind	Advocat	Bless Me Sister
1997
Barna Boy	Carlito Brigante	Penny A Day
1996
Star Rage	Romancer	Non Vintage
1995
Home Counties	Family Way	Test match
1994
Dizzy	Diplomatic	Steel Dawn
1993
Thumbs Up	High Baron	Spinning
1992
Dusty Miller	Bank View	Viking Flagship
1991
Winnie The Witch	Celtic Bob	One For The Pot

1990-1988
1990
Moody Man	Smart Performer	Persillant
1989
Willsford	Travel Mystery	Fiefdom
1988
Cashew King	Sunbia	Rampallion

The County Handicap Hurdle is a Premier Handicap National Hunt hurdle race in Great Britain which is open to horses aged five years or older. It is run on the New Course at Cheltenham over a distance of about 2 miles and 1 furlong (2 miles and 179 yards, or 3,382 metres), and during its running there are eight hurdles to be jumped. It is a handicap race, and it is scheduled to take place each year during the Cheltenham Festival in March.

== History ==
The County Hurdle was established in 1920, and its inaugural winner was Trespasser, ridden by George Duller. Its title between 1995 and 2016 was the Vincent O'Brien County Handicap Hurdle in honour of Vincent O'Brien, an Irish racehorse trainer who retired in 1994. During his career O'Brien recorded a total of twenty-three victories at the Cheltenham festival.

For many years the County Hurdle was traditionally the last race to be run at the Festival. However, a new running order was announced ahead of the 2009 meeting, and it is now the second race on the final day. The race held Grade 3 status until 2022 and was reclassified as a Premier Handicap from the 2023 running when Grade 3 was renamed by the British Horseracing Authority.

In 2024, the race changed sponsor from McCoy Contractors to BetMGM

== Records ==
Most successful horse since 1946:

- no horse has won this race more than once since 1946

Leading jockey since 1946 (5 wins):

- Paul Townend - Wicklow Brave (2015), Arctic Fire (2017), State Man (2022), Absurde (2024), Kargese (2025)

Leading trainer since 1946 (8 wins):

- Willie Mullins – Thousand Stars (2010), Final Approach (2011), Wicklow Brave (2015), Arctic Fire (2017), Saint Roi (2020), State Man (2022), Absurde (2024), Kargese (2025)

== List of renewals ==
- Weights given in stones and pounds.

Date	Winner	SP	Age	Weight (st-lb)	Jockey	Trainer	Owner	Runners
1920, 11 March	Trespasser	4/7F	4	11-09	George Duller	J. M. Bell	P. Heybourn	8
1921, 3 March	Water Bottle	5/1	—	11–13	F. Croney	A. Scott	A. Scott	12
1922, 9 March	Lukeston	100/30	—	12-02	F. Rees	Harrison	E. Tattersall	7
1923, 7 March	Assaroe	6/1	—	11–10	F. Brown (Note: amateur jockey)	Newey	Stanley Howard	7
1924, 12 March	Argo	2/1F	—	11-08	George Duller	Coulthwaite	Lord Londesborough	13
1925, 11 March	Rosecome	100/7	5	10-06	J. East	W. McKie	A. Sanders	15
1926, 9 March	Checktaker	5/2F	5	11–11	George Duller	H. Harrison	Harrison	13
1927, 8 March	Rolie	7/1	6	11-06	H. Cheshire	T. Rimell	T. Rimell	11
1928, 14 March	Truthful James	7/1	—	11-03	Parvin	Powell	Milne	15
1929, 13 March	Castlederg	8/1	7	11-02	F. Rees	Whitelaw	Whitelaw	14
1930, 12 March	Gonedry	9/2	8	10–11	P. Dennis	H. Dyke Dennis	Pellerin	15
no race 1931 (Note: The race was abandoned in 1931 because of frost, and in 1937 because of flooding)
1932, 3 March	Fouquet	11/4	5	10-00	W. Stott	F. Wootton	S. Wootton	10
1933, 9 March	Hightide IV.	20/1	7	11-03	Wilson	Bullock	T. Richardson	13
1934, 8 March	Jack Grange	8/1	5	10-00	W. Hollick	Barthropp	Sir A. McAlpine	17
1935, 14 March	Polly Stephens	2/1F	8	11-00	Ingham	Cundell	Rieb	15
1936, 12 March	Back Isle	7/1	8	11-03	Fulke Walwyn	Roberts	C. Jones	21
no race 1937
1938, 10 March	Prince Rouge	10/1	8	10–12	J. Prendergast	W. Stubbs	Mrs D. Thomas	17
1939, 9 March	Abbot's Own	13/2	8	12-01	H. Nicholson	O'Sullivan	Mrs E. Scott	17
1940, 20 March	Sam Brown	6/1	6	11-01	T. Rimell	trained privately	M. C. Willes	10
1941, 20 March	Celibate II	7/1	9	11-04	Hollick	D. Dick	Mrs D. P. Dick	19
1942, 21 March	Red April	100/8	5	11–13	E. Foley	Stalbridge	M. Jones	21
no race 1943–45 (Note: It was cancelled in 1943–45 because of World War II)
1946, 14 March	Vidi	6/1	5	11–10	Don Butchers	Reg Hobbs	A. E. Saunders	27
no race 1947 (Note: The 1947 edition was abandoned because of snow and frost)
1948, 4 March	Cape Light	2/1F	5	11-01	Joe Maguire	Ivor Anthony	—	21
no race 1949 (Note: It was cancelled in 1949 due to frost, and in 1955 due to snow)
1950, 9 March	Blue Raleigh	25/1	7	10-00	Jimmy Power	Bobby Renton	Mrs L. Brotherton	19
1951, 25 April	Southwick	100/7	7	10-03	George Spann	J. Whiting	—	21
1952, 6 March	Ballymacan	100/7	5	10–12	Bryan Marshall	Neville Crump	H. D. Waddington	20
1953, 5 March	Teapot II	4/1	8	12-07	Pat Taaffe	Clem Magnier	—	16
1954	Bold Baby		8	12-00	Paddy Powell	Michael Dawson		
no race 1955
1956	Pommel		9	10–11	Steve Boddy	John Waugh		
1957	Flaming East		8	10-05	Peter Pickford	Ricky Vallance		
1958	Friendly Boy		6	10-05	Liam Brennan	Joe Osborne		
1959	Approval		13	11-02	Derek Leslie	Syd Mercer		
1960	Albergo		6	12-05	Doug Page	Clem Magnier		
1961	Most Unusual		6	10-07	Josh Gifford	Bill Ransom		
1962	Sky Pink		5	10–11	Fred Winter	Ryan Price		
1963	Bahrain		6	10-06	Tommy Carberry	Dan Moore		
1964	Icy Wonder		5	10-02	Jeff King	Vernon Cross		
1965	Mayfair Bill		6	10-04	Andrew Turnell	Bob Turnell		
1966	Roaring Twenties		6	11-02	George Milburn	Ken Oliver		
1967	Cool Alibi		5	10-09	Roddy Reid	Rodney Bower		
1968	Jolly Signal		6	10–11	Jimmy Uttley	Earl Jones		
1969	Gay Knight		5	10-03	Aly Branford	Les Kennard		
1970	Khan		6	09-11	Lord Petersham	Delmer Harty		
1971	Carry Off		7	10-01	David Goulding	Nigel Angus		
1972	Cold Day		6	10-08	Ron Hyett	Katie Gaze		
1973	Current Romance		7	10-07	David Nicholson	Frenchie Nicholson		
1974	True Song		5	11-02	Gary Old	Donald Underwood		
no race 1975 (Note: The race was abandoned in 1975 due to waterlogging, and in 1978 because of snow.)
1976	Java Fox		6	10-01	George Jones	Roy Cambidge		
1977	Kilcoleman		5	10-07	Tommy Kinane	Billy Boyers		
no race 1978
1979	Monte Ceco		6	10–12	Colin Tinkler	Fred Rimell		
1980	Prince of Bermuda		5	10-00	Steve Knight	Bob Turnell		
1981	Staplestown		6	10-07	Tommy Ryan	Edward O'Grady		
1982	Path of Peace		6	10-06	Jonjo O'Neill	Chris Thornton		
1983	Robin Wonder		5	10-03	Jeff Davies	David Elsworth		
1984	Hill's Guard		5	10–11	Andrew Stringer	Andrew Scott		
1985	Floyd		5	10-05	Colin Brown	David Elsworth		
1986	Jobroke		6	10-03	Jonjo O'Neill	Peter Easterby		
1987	Neblin		8	11-00	Richard Guest	Toby Balding		
1988, 17 March	Cashew King	9/1	5	10-04	Trevor Wall	Bryan McMahon	Mrs J A Wall	24
1989, 16 March	Willsford	11/1	6	10-08	Michael Bowlby	Jenny Pitman	A M Kaplan	21
1990, 15 March	Moody Man	9/1	5	11-02	Peter Hobbs	Philip Hobbs	James Burley	20
1991, 14 March	Winnie the Witch	33/1	7	09-08	David Bridgwater	Ken Bridgwater	Paddocks Thoroughbred Racing Ltd	26
1992, 12 March	Dusty Miller	9/1	6	10-06	Jamie Osborne	Simon Sherwood	Watership Down Racing	27
1993, 18 March	Thumbs Up	16/1	7	10-02	Richard Dunwoody	Nicky Henderson	Michael Buckley	21
1994, 17 March	Dizzy	12/1	6	10-00	Tony Dobbin	Peter Monteith	Lt-Col W L Monteith	24
1995, 16 March	Home Counties	14/1	6	10–12	James Moffatt	Dudley Moffatt	Roxy Cinemas (dalton)	23
1996, 14 March	Star Rage	14/1	6	10-00	Dean Gallagher	Jimmy Harris	J David Abell	28
1997, 13 March	Barna Boy	14/1	9	10–12	Richard Dunwoody	Nicky Henderson	Lynn Wilson	20
1998, 19 March	Blowing Wind	15/8F	5	11-08	Tony McCoy	Martin Pipe	P A Deal	27
1999, 18 March	Sir Talbot	10/1	5	10-00	Timmy Murphy	Jim Old	W E Sturt	28
2000, 16 March	Master Tern	9/2F	5	10-03	Tony Dobbin	Jonjo O'Neill	John P McManus	21
no race 2001 (Note: The 2001 running was cancelled because of a foot-and-mouth crisis.)
2002, 14 March	Rooster Booster	8/1	8	11-01	Richard Johnson	Philip Hobbs	Terry Warner	21
2003, 13 March	Spirit Leader	10/1	7	11-07	Barry Geraghty	Jessica Harrington	D Thompson	28
2004, 18 March	Sporazene	7/1J	5	10–13	Ruby Walsh	Paul Nicholls	Ged Mason & David Jackson	23
2005, 18 March	Fontanesi	16/1	5	10–10	Timmy Murphy	Martin Pipe	The Johnson Family	30
2006, 17 March	Desert Quest	4/1J	6	10–10	Ruby Walsh	Paul Nicholls	Mrs M Findlay	29
2007, 16 March	Pedrobob	12/1	9	10-00	Philip Carberry	Tony Mullins	Barry Connell	28
2008, 14 March	Silver Jaro	50/1	5	10–13	Noel Fehily	Tom Hogan	Miss M A Masterson	22
2009, 13 March	American Trilogy	20/1	5	11-00	Ruby Walsh	Paul Nicholls	Fulton, Donlon, Kilduff & Scott-MacDonald	27
2010, 19 March	Thousand Stars	20/1	6	10-05	Katie Walsh	Willie Mullins	Hammer & Trowel Syndicate	28
2011, 18 March	Final Approach	10/1	5	10–12	Ruby Walsh	Willie Mullins	Douglas Taylor	26
2012, 16 March	Alderwood	20/1	8	11-01	Tony McCoy	Thomas Mullins	John P McManus	26
2013, 15 March	Ted Veale	10/1	6	10-06	Bryan Cooper	Tony Martin	John Breslin	28
2014, 14 March	Lac Fontana	11/1	5	10–11	Daryl Jacob	Paul Nicholls	Potensis Limited	28
2015, 13 March	Wicklow Brave	25/1	6	11-04	Paul Townend	Willie Mullins	Wicklow Bloodstock Limited	24
2016, 18 March	Superb Story	8/1	5	10–12	Harry Skelton	Dan Skelton	Holt, Robinson, Taylor & Miller	26
2017, 17 March	Arctic Fire	20/1	8	11–12	Paul Townend	Willie Mullins	Wicklow Bloodstock Limited	26
2018, 16 March	Mohaayed	33/1	6	10–08	Bridget Andrews	Dan Skelton	Mrs June Watts	24
2019, 15 March	Ch'tibello	12/1	8	11-05	Harry Skelton	Dan Skelton	Can't Say No Partnership	24
2020, 13 March	Saint Roi	11/2	5	10-13	Barry Geraghty	Willie Mullins	John P McManus	23
2021, 19 March	Belfast Banter	33/1	6	10-00	Kevin Sexton	Peter Fahey	Direct Bloodstock Ltd	23
2022, 18 March	State Man	11/4F	5	11-01	Paul Townend	Willie Mullins	Mrs J Donnelly	26
2023, 17 March	Faivoir	33/1	8	10-07	Bridget Andrews	Dan Skelton	Mrs S Lawrence	24
2024, 15 March	Absurde	12/1	6	10-10	Paul Townend	Willie Mullins	H O S Syndicate	17
2025, 14 March	Kargese	3/1 F	5	11-03	Paul Townend	Willie Mullins	Kenny Alexander	16
2026, 13 March	Wilful	14/1	7	11-02	Jonjo O'Neill Jr	Jonjo O'Neill	Mrs Fitri Hay	23

== See also ==
- Horse racing in Great Britain
- List of British National Hunt races
