= Tiutchev (horse) =

Thoroughbred racehorse (1993–2022)

- Sire: Soviet Star
- Dam: Cut Ahead
- Damsire: Kalaglow
- Sex: Gelding
- Foaled: 23 April 1993
- Died: 8 November 2022 (aged 29)
- Country: Great Britain
- Colour: Bay
- Breeder: Mrs D M De Rothschild
- Owner: The Liars Poker Partnership
- Trainer: Roger Charlton; Henrietta Knight; David Nicholson; Nicky Henderson; Martin Pipe
- Record: 44: 12-6
- Earnings: £445,240

Major wins
- Lanzarote Hurdle (1999); Arkle Challenge Trophy (2000); Swordlestown Cup Novice Chase (2000); Ascot Chase (2001, 2003); Martell Cognac Cup Chase (2004)

Tiutchev (23 April 1993 – 8 November 2022) was an English racehorse who started his racing career as a Flat horse for trainer Roger Charlton.

Tiutchev made his debut in September 1996 in a Haydock maiden, where he finished 6th. He went on to have two further runs for Roger Charlton, before being transferred to the yard of National Hunt trainer Henrietta Knight, for whom he made his debut when finishing 4th in maiden hurdle at Warwick in February 1997. He failed to shine in his next three races, where he fell and then unseated his rider in the next two. He ended the season on an improved note however, as he was placed in his next 2 runs.

Tiutchev then changed yards again during the summer of 1997, when he joined trainer David Nicholson. He made a winning debut for him in a Novices' Hurdle in October 1997 and followed that up with another victory at Cheltenham in November. He had mixed fortunes in his next three starts, of which he won one, was runner up in one and fell in the other. But he bounced back to the Lanzarote Hurdle at Kempton in January 1999. Following that win, he was sent off 6/4 favourite for the Tote Gold Trophy, but disappointed by finishing 6th, which he followed by filling the same position in the Champion Hurdle at Cheltenham, behind Istabraq. In his final of the season, he was sent off the favourite for the Welsh Champion Hurdle, but could only finish 2nd.

Tiutchev changed yards again in the summer of 1999, as he joined the yard of Nicky Henderson. He was sent straight over fences, and it was here under Henderson that Tiutchev really excelled and proved himself to be the Champion Novice Chaser in the 1999/00 season. Although he only gained four more successes after that season, he ran creditably in numerous Grade 1 Chases including for Martin Pipe, who he joined in 2003. After a distinguished racing career, Tiutchev was finally retired after being pulled up in the 2005 Betfair Bowl at Aintree.

Tiutchev spent his retirement on the farm of one of his part-owners, where his paddock companion was Kissair. He died on 8 November 2022, aged 29.
