= Earth Summit (horse) =

British racehorse

- Sire: Celtic Cone
- Grandsire: Celtic Ash
- Dam: Win Green Hill
- Damsire: National Trust
- Sex: Gelding
- Foaled: 1988
- Country: Great Britain
- Colour: Bay
- Breeder: R. P. Fry & J. A. B. Old
- Owner: The Summit Partnership
- Record: 41: 10 - 7 - 1
- Earnings: £372,566

Major wins
- Scottish Grand National (1994); Peter Marsh Chase (1995); Welsh National (1997); Grand National (1998); Becher Chase (1998)

Earth Summit (1988–2005) was a British racehorse. He was foaled in 1988, a son of Celtic Cone, who was a winning stayer on the flat and over hurdles. Celtic Cone loved soft ground, as did many of his progeny. Earth Summit was bought by a six-man partnership aptly named The Summit Partnership, in 1992 (including footballer Ricky George, Aintree press officer Nigel Payne, Partner in an accountancy firm Peter Earl, retired businessman Gordon Perry, local government officer Mike Bailey and media buying agency proprietor Bob Sims) and began his racing career as a four-year-old, finishing second in a bumper (a National Hunt flat race) at Cheltenham.

As the horse developed, it became clear that, like his father, he appreciated long distances. In a thirty-seven-race career that spanned eight years, Earth Summit fell only once, when in the lead, jumping the second last fence at Cheltenham in 1995.

Twelve months earlier, as a novice, he had won the Scottish National over four miles one furlong at Ayr. In February 1996, Earth Summit suffered a near fatal injury at Haydock and it seemed likely he would never race again. Twenty-one months later, the gelding returned to the track, again at Haydock, and came through unscathed.

On 27 December 1997, barely seven weeks after his comeback race, Earth Summit won the Welsh National at Chepstow, returning odds of 25 to 1.

At Aintree on 4 April 1998, Earth Summit jumped his way into the history books, when, having shared the lead with Suny Bay for the last third of the Martell Grand National, he pulled clear before the second last, running on to win the biggest horse race in the world by eleven lengths. No other horse in history, including Red Rum, has ever won the Aintree Grand National and the Scottish and Welsh equivalents.

After suffering a minor injury, Earth Summit was retired in 2000 and given to his lass, Marcella Bayliss. He won ten races and £420,000 in prize money.

== Death ==
On 23 March 2005, Earth Summit was humanely put down after being diagnosed with cancer in his liver and spleen. The seventeen-year-old horse had been ill for two weeks.
