= Philip Carberry =

Irish jockey

Personal information
- Born: 1 November 1980 (age 45) Ireland
- Occupation: Jockey

Horse racing career
- Sport: Horse racing

Major racing wins
- Champion Hurdle, Irish Grand National, Grand Steeple Chase de Paris

Significant horses
- Sublimity, Point Barrow, Princesse D'Anjou

Philip Carberry (born 1 November 1980) is a retired Irish national hunt jockey.

He is a member of the Carberry racing dynasty with his father Tommy Carberry a Gold Cup and Grand National winner, later a trainer. Philip's brother Paul Carberry is a two time Irish Champion Jockey meanwhile sister Nina Carberry was a hugely successful amateur jockey.

== Racing career ==
Philip rode as an amateur in 1997 before turning professional the following season.

He has won many top level races around the world, including the 2006 Irish Grand National with Point Barrow and the 2007 Champion Hurdle with Sublimity. During the same Cheltenham Festival, Carberry added another big winner with Pedrobob in the County Hurdle.

Following this he moved to Chantilly in France linking up with trainer Francois Cottin. Additional success followed in France with two victories in the Group 1 Grand Steeplechase de Paris on Princess D'Anjou. Winning the race for the first time in 2006, Carberry was the first overseas jockey to win the race since Fred Winter on Mandarin in 1962.

Carberry retired in 2017 following a career where he won over 300 races. He began supporting wife Louisa with their training operation in France.

== Cheltenham Festival Winners (2) ==
- Champion Hurdle - Sublimity (2007)
- County Hurdle - Pedrobob (2007)

== Major Wins ==
(United Kingdom) Great Britain

- Champion Hurdle - (1) Sublimity (2007)

France

- Grand Steeplechase de Paris - (2) Princess D'Anjou (2006, 2008)
