= Scottish Grand National =

Steeplechase horse race in Scotland

- Class: Premier Handicap
- Location: Ayr Racecourse; Ayrshire, Scotland
- Inaugurated: 1867
- Race type: Chase
- Sponsor: Coral
- Website: Ayr

Race information
- Distance: 4m (6,538 metres)
- Surface: Turf
- Track: Left-handed
- Qualification: Five-years-old and up
- Weight: Handicap
- Purse: £150,000 (2021); 1st: £84,405

Scottish Grand National
2026
Kap Vert	Git Maker	Kim Roque

Previous years
2025
Captain Cody	Klarc Kent	Our Power
2024
Macdermott	Surrey Quest	Git Maker
2023
Kitty's Light	Cooper's Cross	Flash De Touzaine
2022
Win My Wings	Kitty's Light	Major Dundee
2021
Mighty Thunder	Dingo Dollar	Mister Fogpatches

2020-2011
2019
Takingrisks	Crosspark	Cloth Cap
2018
Joe Farrell	Ballyoptic	Vintage Clouds
2017
Vicente	Cogry	Benbens
2016
Vicente	Alvarado	Seeyouatmidnight
2015
Wayward Prince	Goonyella	Benbens
2014
Al Co	Godsmejudge	Trustan Times
2013
Godsmejudge	Big Occasion	Mister Marker
2012
Merigo	Auroras Encore	King Fontaine
2011
Beshabar	Merigo	Always Right

2010–2001
2010
Merigo	Gone To Lunch	No Panic
2009
Hello Bud	Gone To Lunch	Out The Black
2008
Iris De Balme	Halcon Genelardais	Flintoff
2007
Hot Weld	Nine De Sivola	Parsons Legacy
2006
Run For Paddy	Ladalko	Royal Emperor
2005
Joes Edge	Cornish Rebel	Another Rum
2004
Grey Abbey	Kerry Lads	Maximize
2003
Ryalux	Stormez	Spendid
2002
Take Control	Shotgun Willy	Gunther McBride
2001
Gingembre	Ad Hoc	Supreme Glory

2000–1991
2000
Paris Pike	Noble Lord	Young Kenny
1999
Young Kenny	Hollybank Buck	Full of Oats
1998
Baronet	Eudipe	Belmont King
1997
Belmont King	Samlee	Baronet
1996
Moorcroft Boy	General Wolfe	Arthur's Minstrel
1995
Willsford	Sweet Duke	Lo Stregone
1994
Earth Summit	Bishop's Island	Superior Finish
1993
Run For Free	Merry Master	Mister Ed
1992
Captain Dibble	Dalkey Sound	Off The Bru
1991
Killone Abbey	Omerta	Over The Road

1990–1988
1990
Four Trix	Tartan Takeover	Birling Jack
1989
Roll-A-Joint	Charter Hardware	Four Trix
1988
Mighty Mark	Cheeny's Brig	Over The Road

The Scottish Grand National is a Premier Handicap National Hunt steeplechase in Great Britain which is open to horses aged five years or older. It is run at Ayr, Scotland, over a distance of about 4 miles (3 miles 7 furlongs and 176 yards, or 6,397 metres) and during its running there are 27 fences to be jumped. It is a handicap race, and takes place each year in April. It is Scotland's equivalent of the Grand National, and is held during Ayr's two-day Scottish Grand National Festival meeting.

== History ==
The race, then known as the "West of Scotland Grand National", was first run at a course near Houston, Renfrewshire in 1858. It consisted of 32 jumps, mainly stone walls.

In 1867, after objections by the leader of the Free Kirk in Houston, the race moved to Bogside Racecourse, near Irvine. The inaugural winner at Bogside, The Elk, was owned by the Duke of Hamilton. During the early part of its history the race's distance was about 3 miles (4.8 km). It was later extended to 3 7/8 mi (6.2 km), and became known by its present title in 1880, when it was won by Peacock.

Bogside Racecourse closed in 1965, and the Scottish Grand National was transferred to Ayr the following year. At this point the race was increased to its present length. Several winners of the Scottish Grand National have also won its English counterpart at Aintree. The first to complete the double was Music Hall, the winner of the 1922 Grand National. The feat has been achieved more recently by Little Polveir and Earth Summit, but the only horse to win both races in the same year was Red Rum in 1974.

In 2021, the race was moved to a Sunday due to the funeral of Prince Philip, the Duke of Edinburgh, taking place on Saturday

== Prize money ==
The winning horse in 1867 won £100, increasing to £440 by 1906, £1030 in 1950, £5,436 in 1963 and £122,433 in 2019.

== Television coverage ==
The first television coverage of the Scottish National was in 1953 on the BBC. It was also shown the following year, but then wasn't screened again until 1969 on ITV and has been shown live ever since. Coverage moved to Channel 4 in 1986 and back to ITV in 2017.

== Records ==
Most successful horse (3 wins):

- Couvrefeu II – 1911, 1912, 1913
- Southern Hero – 1934, 1936, 1939
- Queen's Taste – 1953, 1954, 1956

Leading jockey

- All-time (4 wins)
  - Charlie Cunningham – Bellman (1881), Wild Meadow (1885), Orcadian (1887), Deloraine (1889)
- At Ayr (3 wins)
  - Mark Dwyer – Androma (1984, 1985), Moorcroft Boy (1996)

Leading trainer

- All-time (5 wins)
  - Neville Crump – Wot No Sun (1949), Merryman II (1959), Arcturus (1968), Salkeld (1980), Canton (1983)
  - Ken Oliver – Pappageno's Cottage (1963), The Spaniard (1970), Young Ash Leaf (1971), Fighting Fit (1979), Cockle Strand (1982)
- At Ayr (4 wins)
  - Ken Oliver – The Spaniard (1970), Young Ash Leaf (1971), Fighting Fit (1979), Cockle Strand (1982)

== Winners at Ayr ==
- Weights given in stones and pounds

Year	Winner	Age	Weight	Jockey	Trainer
1966	African Patrol	7	10-07	Johnny Leech	Robert Fairbairn
1967	The Fossa	10	09-12	Andrew Turnell	Fred Rimell
1968	Arcturus	7	10-04	Pat Buckley	Neville Crump
1969	Playlord	8	12-00	Ron Barry	Gordon W. Richards
1970	The Spaniard	8	10-00	Barry Brogan	Ken Oliver
1971	Young Ash Leaf	7	10-02	Peter Ennis	Ken Oliver
1972	Quick Reply	7	09-09	Maurice Barnes	Harry Bell
1973	Esban	9	09-11	Jimmy Bourke	Robert Clay
1974	Red Rum	9	11–13	Brian Fletcher	Ginger McCain
1975	Barona	9	10-00	Paul Kelleway	Roddy Armytage
1976	Barona	10	10-02	Paul Kelleway	Roddy Armytage
1977	Sebastian V	9	10-02	Ridley Lamb	Harry Bell
1978	King Con	9	09-13	Peter Craggs (Note: amateur jockey)	Graham Renilson
1979	Fighting Fit	7	10–10	Colin Hawkins	Ken Oliver
1980	Salkeld	8	10-00	Denis Atkins	Neville Crump
1981	Astral Charmer	8	09-10	John Goulding	Harry Bell
1982	Cockle Strand	9	09-11	David Dutton	Ken Oliver
1983	Canton	9	10-02	Kevin Whyte	Neville Crump
1984	Androma	7	10-00	Mark Dwyer	Jimmy FitzGerald
1985	Androma	8	10-00	Mark Dwyer	Jimmy FitzGerald
1986	Hardy Lad	9	10-00	Micky Hammond	Jumbo Wilkinson
1987	Little Polveir	10	10-00	Peter Scudamore	John Edwards
1988	Mighty Mark	9	10-05	Brian Storey	Frank Walton
1989	Roll-a-Joint	11	10-00	Brendan Powell	Chris Popham
1990	Four Trix	9	10-00	Derek Byrne	Gordon W. Richards
1991	Killone Abbey	8	10-00	Chris Grant	Arthur Stephenson
1992	Captain Dibble	7	11-00	Peter Scudamore	Nigel Twiston-Davies
1993	Run for Free	9	11–10	Mark Perrett	Martin Pipe
1994	Earth Summit	6	10-00	David Bridgwater	Nigel Twiston-Davies
1995	Willsford	12	10–12	Rodney Farrant	Jenny Pitman
1996	Moorcroft Boy	11	10-02	Mark Dwyer	David Nicholson
1997	Belmont King	9	11–10	Tony McCoy	Paul Nicholls
1998	Baronet	8	10-00	Adrian Maguire	David Nicholson
1999	Young Kenny	8	11–10	Brendan Powell	Peter Beaumont
2000	Paris Pike	8	11-00	Adrian Maguire	Ferdy Murphy
2001	Gingembre	7	11-02	Andrew Thornton	Lavinia Taylor
2002	Take Control	8	10-06	Ruby Walsh	Martin Pipe
2003	Ryalux	10	10-05	Richard McGrath	Andy Crook
2004	Grey Abbey	10	11–12	Graham Lee	Howard Johnson
2005	Joes Edge	8	09-11	Keith Mercer	Ferdy Murphy
2006	Run for Paddy	10	10-02	Carl Llewellyn	Carl Llewellyn
2007	Hot Weld	8	09-09	P. J. McDonald	Ferdy Murphy
2008	Iris de Balme	8	09-07	Charlie Huxley	Sean Curran
2009	Hello Bud	11	10-09	Paddy Brennan	Nigel Twiston-Davies
2010	Merigo	9	10-00	Timmy Murphy	Andrew Parker
2011	Beshabar	9	10-04	Richard Johnson	Tim Vaughan
2012	Merigo	11	10-02	Timmy Murphy	Andrew Parker
2013	Godsmejudge	7	11-03	Wayne Hutchinson	Alan King
2014	Al Co	9	10-02	Jamie Moore	Peter Bowen
2015	Wayward Prince	11	10-07	Robbie Dunne	Hilary Parrott
2016	Vicente	7	11-03	Sam Twiston-Davies	Paul Nicholls
2017	Vicente	8	11–10	Sam Twiston-Davies	Paul Nicholls
2018	Joe Farrell	9	10-06	Adam Wedge	Rebecca Curtis
2019	Takingrisks	10	10-01	Sean Quinlan	Nicky Richards
	no race 2020 (Note: The 2020 running was cancelled because of the COVID-19 pandemic in the United Kingdom)
2021	Mighty Thunder	8	11-01	Tom Scudamore	Lucinda Russell
2022	Win My Wings	9	10-12	Rob James	Christian Williams
2023	Kitty's Light	7	11-00	Jack Tudor	Christian Williams
2024	Macdermott	6	10-07	Danny Mullins	Willie Mullins
2025	Captain Cody	7	11-04	Harry Cobden	Willie Mullins
2026	Kap Vert	6	10-12	Sean Houlihan	Philip Hobbs & Johnson White

== Winners at Bogside ==
Year	Winner	Age	Weight	Jockey	Trainer
1947	Rowland Roy	8	11-02	Mr Richard Black	Fulke Walwyn
1948	Magnetic Fin	9	10-05	Lionel Vick	Charlie Hall
1949	Wot No Sun	7	11-05	Arthur Thompson	Neville Crump
1950	Sanvina	10	12-02	Ken Oliver	J Wight
1951	Court Painter	11	9-07	Frankie Carroll	Verley Bewicke
1952	Flagrant Mac	8	11–12	Jimmy Power	Bobby Renton
1953	Queen's Taste	7	10-02	Tommy Robson (Note: amateur jockey)	H Clarkson
1954	Queen's Taste	8	10-09	George Slack	H Clarkson
1955	Bar Point	8	10-02	Derek Ancil	Bobby Renton
1956	Queen's Taste	10	11-00	Dick Curran	H Clarkson
1957	Bremontier	10	10–12	Adolphe Rossio	P Taylor
1958	Game Field	8	11–10	Jack Boddy	J Fawcus
1959	Merryman II	8	10–12	Gerry Scott	Neville Crump
1960	Fincham	8	10-00	Mick Batchelor	J White
1961	Kinmont Wullie	7	10-07	Chris Stobbs	Arthur Stephenson
1962	Sham Fight	10	10–10	Tommy Robson	T Robson
1963	Pappageno's Cottage	8	10-09	Tim Brookshaw	Ken Oliver
1964	Popham Down	7	10–00	Johnny Haine	Fulke Walwyn
1965	Brasher	9	10-05	Jimmy FitzGerald	Tommy Robson

== Earlier winners ==
- 1867 – The Elk
- 1868 – Greenland
- 1869 – Huntsman
- 1870 – Snowstorm
- 1871 – Keystone
- 1872 – Cinna
- 1873 – Hybla
- 1874 – Ouragon II
- 1875 – Solicitor
- 1876 – Earl Marshal
- 1877 – Solicitor
- 1878 – no race
- 1879 – Militant
- 1880 – Peacock
- 1881 – Bellman
- 1882 – Gunboat
- 1883 – Kerclaw
- 1884 – The Peer
- 1885 – Wild Meadow
- 1886 – Crossbow
- 1887 – Orcadian
- 1888 – Ireland
- 1889 – Deloraine
- 1890 – no race
- 1891 – see note below (Note: There were only two runners in 1891 – neither could clear the second fence and there was no winner)
- 1892 – Lizzie
- 1893 – Lady Ellen II
- 1894 – Leybourne
- 1895 – Nepcote
- 1896 – Cadlaw Cairn
- 1897 – Modest Friar
- 1898 – Trade Mark
- 1899 – Tyrolean
- 1900 – Dorothy Vane
- 1901 – Big Busbie
- 1902 – Canter Home
- 1903 – Chit Chat
- 1904 – Innismacsaint
- 1905 – Theodocian
- 1906 – Creolin
- 1907 – Barney III
- 1908 – Atrato
- 1909 – Mount Prospect's Fortune
- 1910 – The Duffrey
- 1911 – Couvrefeu II
- 1912 – Couvrefeu II
- 1913 – Couvrefeu II
- 1914 – Scrabee
- 1915 – Templedowney
- 1916 – no race
- 1917 – no race
- 1918 – no race
- 1919 – The Turk
- 1920 – Music Hall
- 1921 – no race
- 1922 – Sergeant Murphy
- 1923 – Harrismith
- 1924 – Royal Chancellor
- 1925 – Gerald L.
- 1926 – Estuna
- 1927 – Estuna
- 1928 – Ardeen
- 1929 – Donzelon
- 1930 – Drintyre
- 1931 – Annandale
- 1932 – Clydesdale
- 1933 – Libourg
- 1934 – Southern Hero
- 1935 – Kellsboro' Jack
- 1936 – Southern Hero
- 1937 – Right'un
- 1938 – Young Mischief
- 1939 – Southern Hero
- 1940–46 – no race

== See also ==
- Welsh Grand National
- Irish Grand National
- Ulster Grand National
- Horse racing in Scotland
- List of British National Hunt races

== Sources ==
- Ladbrokes Pocket Companion 1990/91. Aesculus Press. 1990. p. 71. ISBN 1-871093-21-X.
