= Ken Oliver (racehorse trainer) =

Scottish racehorse trainer, breeder and jockey

- Birth name: James Kenneth Murray Oliver
- Occupation: Racehorse trainer, breeder, jockey, livestock auctioneer
- Discipline: Steeplechase
- Born: February 1, 1914; Minto, Roxburghshire, Scotland
- Died: June 17, 1999 (aged 85)
- Spouse(s): Joan Innes (m. 1940); Rhona Wilkinson (m. 1958)
- Major wins/Championships: Scottish Grand National (1950 as jockey; 1963, 1970, 1971, 1979, 1982 as trainer

Honors
- OBE (1997)

James Kenneth Murray Oliver OBE (1 February 1914 – 17 June 1999) was a Scottish racehorse trainer, breeder and jockey. In a career spanning over fifty years he trained over 1,000 winners.

== Life & times ==
Oliver was educated at Warriston School, Moffat and Merchiston Castle School in Edinburgh. After school he joined the family livestock auctioneering business of Andrew Oliver & Son in Hawick, the oldest such firm in the UK having been founded in 1817. He made his winning point-to-point debut in the spring of 1935 on a one-eyed horse called Delman. In September 1937 he held his first bloodstock sales at Kelso.

During World War Two, Oliver served with the Yorkshire Hussars in North Africa and Sicily. He was invalided back to the Scottish Borders and decided the family firm should set up an estate agency. The firm was soon selling farms all over Great Britain and occasionally livestock to the new owners as well.

In 1950 he won the Scottish Grand National as a jockey on a horse called Sanvina. In the early 1950s he received a permit to train; his first victory in 1953 at Rothbury was also one of his final wins as a jockey.

In the 1959 Grand National the Oliver trained Wyndburgh finished second. The horse would repeat the same result in the 1962 Grand National, the only horse to ever finish second three times without winning. Oliver was also second in the 1968 Grand National with Moidore's Token.

Oliver won his first Scottish Grand National in 1963 with Pappageno's Cottage. He would win a record five Scottish Grand Nationals with further wins in 1970, 1971, 1979 and 1982.

In November 1968 he won five races in a day at Wolverhampton. At the peak of his career he was winning around 50 races a season.

In 1962 Oliver and Willie Stephenson resurrected the Doncaster Bloodstock Sales.

Oliver was appointed an OBE in the 1997 Queen's Birthday Honours list for services to farming and the local community.

== Notable wins ==
- Scottish Grand National, 1963, 1970, 1971, 1979 and 1982.
- Grand Annual Chase, Cheltenham Festival, 1965, 1977.
- County Handicap Hurdle, Cheltenham Festival, 1966.
- Arkle Challenge Trophy, Cheltenham Festival, 1966.
- Hennessy Gold Cup, 1979.
- Greenall Whitley Gold Cup, 1972, 1973, 1975.
- Charlie Hall Chase, 1988.
- ASW Handicap Chase, 1964, 1965, 1974.

== Biography ==
- Dan Buglass (1994). Ken Oliver: The Benign Bishop. Marlborough Books. ISBN 1873919158.
