= Mick Fitzgerald =

Irish jockey (born 1970)

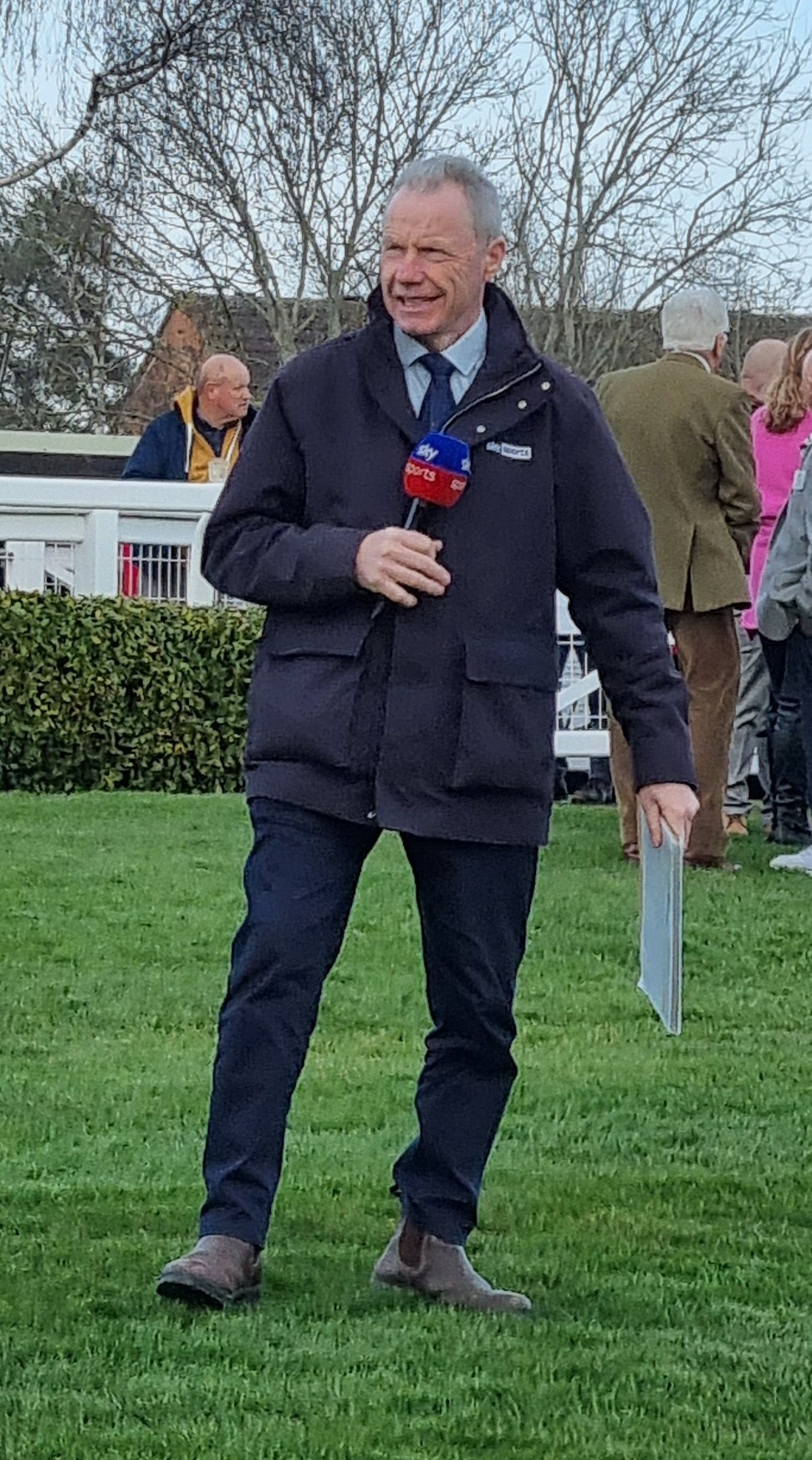
Michael Fitzgerald at Hereford Races 2025

Michael Fitzgerald (born 10 May 1970) is a retired Irish National Hunt jockey and television racing pundit. His most notable victories were in the 1996 Grand National, on Rough Quest, and the 1999 King George VI Chase and Cheltenham Gold Cup on See More Business. Fitzgerald rode for the majority of his career in Great Britain winning over 1250 races.

== Career as a jockey ==
After experience on the Pony racing circuit in Ireland, he began riding out for Richard Lister, a local flat trainer in County Wexford, at the age of 16. This was followed by a move to the Curragh to ride out for John Hayden. At 16, his increase in height and weight forced a switch from flat to National Hunt racing. Fitzgerald's first National Hunt yards were in South West England with John Jenkins and Richard Tucker. His first two winners came during this association at the end of 1988, the first being a horse called Lover's Secret at Ludlow on 11 December. During the 1991/2 National Hunt season, he rode for Jackie Retter, before he struck up a partnership winning 4 races on the horse Duncan Idaho for Gerald Ham. After this, he was given a retainer to Lambourn trainer Nicky Henderson. He remained as the main stable jockey for Henderson until the end of his jockeying career.

Fitzgerald's big winners included the 1996 Grand National, on Rough Quest, and the 1999 King George VI Chase and the Cheltenham Gold Cup on See More Business. He was leading jockey at the Cheltenham Festival in 1999 and 2000. At the time he also rode for Paul Nicholls, who at the time was an up-and-coming trainer, alongside his retainer with Henderson. Later in his career, Fitzgerald came back from injury to win the 2005 Hennessy Gold Cup on Trabolgan at Newbury for Nicky Henderson.

During the 2008 Grand National in which he was riding L'Ami he fell at the second fence sustaining spinal injuries. This was the second injury of this type he sustained in the latter part of his career. On 7 August 2008 due to his injury, aged 38, Fitzgerald was forced into retirement. Although his career was cut short he is still one of the most successful jump jockeys of all time riding over 1250 winners.

== Career post retirement ==
Mick Fitzgerald became a television racing pundit, providing expert analysis and commentary for both flat and National hunt races. Initially working for At The Races, in 2013 he joined the Channel 4 Racing team to give an insight into the racecraft and training of jockeys. Fitzgerald transferred to ITV Racing in 2017. Despite being unable to ride since his injury, he is still closely involved in racing. When not on TV, he spends time at Nicky Henderson's yard helping to advise about race tactics. Fitzgerald is also involved in the British Racing School, coaching young and aspiring jockeys on their technique as well as attitude.

== Personal life ==
Mick Fitzgerald lives in the Lambourn area of Berkshire. He has three children Zac, Oscar and Lola. He lives with his wife. Fitzgerald had an earlier marriage, and was at one time brother-in-law to Paul Nicholls by marriage. Fitzgerald is a well known character on the Lambourn racing scene, and is a close friend of Champion Jockey AP McCoy, with the pair playing golf together often. Fitzgerald has become a patron to Alder Hey Charity.

Fitzgerald wrote an autobiography when he finished riding, called "Better Than Sex: my autobiography". The title comes from his famous quote to Des Lynam live on the BBC after winning the 1996 National – "After that, Des, even sex is an anticlimax!".

Fitzgerald in a patron of the British Horse Foundation.

== Cheltenham Festival wins (14) ==
- Cheltenham Gold Cup - (1) See More Business (1999)
- Queen Mother Champion Chase - (1) Call Equiname (1999)
- Stayers' Hurdle - (1) Bacchanal (2000)
- Arkle Challenge Trophy - (1) Tiutchev (2000)
- RSA Insurance Novices' Chase - (1) Trabolgan (2005)
- Ryanair Chase - (1) Fondmort (2006)
- Triumph Hurdle - (1) Katarino (1999)
- Festival Trophy Handicap Chase - (2) Rough Quest (1995), Marlborough (2000)
- Coral Cup - (1) Xenophon (2003)
- Brown Advisory & Merriebelle Stable Plate Handicap Chase - (1) Non So (2006)
- Cathcart Challenge Cup - (3) Raymylette (1994), Stormy Fairweather (1999, 2000)

== Other major wins ==
(United Kingdom) Great Britain

- Grand National - (1) Rough Quest (1996)
- King George VI Chase - (1) See More Business (1999)
- Tingle Creek Chase - (1) Kauto Star (2005)
- Christmas Hurdle - (2) Geos (2000), Landing Light (2001)
- Henry VIII Novices' Chase - (1) Fondmort (2001)
- Kauto Star Novices' Chase - (3) Fiddling the Facts (1997), Bacchanal (2000), Ungaro (2006)
- Finale Juvenile Hurdle - (3) Mister Banjo (1999), Blue Shark (2005), Good Bye Simon (2006)
- Ascot Chase - (1) Tiutchev (2001)
- Betway Bowl - (1) See More Business (2000)
- Aintree Hurdle -(1) Bimsey (1997)
- Mildmay Novices' Chase - (1) Irish Hussar (2003)
- Sefton Novices' Hurdle - (1) Chief Dan George (2007)

(Republic of Ireland) Ireland

- Punchestown Champion Chase - (2) Big Matt (1998), Get Real (2000)
- Ryanair Novice Chase - (1) Tiutchev (2000)
- Champion Four Year Old Hurdle - (3) Katarino (1999), Quatre Heures (2006), Punjabi (2007)
- Chanelle Pharma Novice Hurdle - (1) Royal Paradise (2005)
