= 1995 Cheltenham Gold Cup =

The 1995 Cheltenham Gold Cup was a horse race which took place at Cheltenham on Thursday March 16, 1995. It was the 68th running of the Cheltenham Gold Cup, and it was won by the pre-race favourite Master Oats. The winner was ridden by Norman Williamson and trained by Kim Bailey.

Williamson and Bailey were the first jockey-trainer partnership to win both the Gold Cup and the Champion Hurdle in the same year since 1950, having won the latter race two days earlier with Alderbrook.

== Race details ==
- Sponsor: Tote
- Winner's prize money: £122,540.00
- Going: Soft
- Number of runners: 15
- Winner's time: 6m 56.2s

== Full result ==
	*	Horse	Age	Jockey	Trainer ^{†}	SP
1		Master Oats	9	Norman Williamson	Kim Bailey	100/30 fav
2	15	Dubacilla (mare)	9	Dean Gallagher	David Nicholson	20/1
3	15	Miinnehoma	12	Richard Dunwoody	Martin Pipe	9/1
4	4	Merry Gale	7	Graham Bradley	Jim Dreaper (IRE)	10/1
5	10	Young Hustler	8	Carl Llewellyn	Nigel Twiston-Davies	33/1
6	3	Monsieur Le Cure	9	Peter Niven	John Edwards	10/1
7	14	Beech Road	13	Tony McCoy	Toby Balding	100/1
8	dist	Jodami	10	Mark Dwyer	Peter Beaumont	7/2
9	dist	Commercial Artist	9	Colin Bowens	Victor Bowens (IRE)	100/1
Fell	Fence 15	Barton Bank	9	David Bridgwater	David Nicholson	8/1
UR	Fence 13	Algan	7	Philippe Chevalier	François Doumen (FR)	16/1
PU	Fence 13	Deep Bramble	8	Chris Maude	Paul Nicholls	14/1
Fell	Fence 13	Flashing Steel	10	Jamie Osborne	John Mulhern (IRE)	25/1
UR	Fence 9	Nuaffe	10	Sean O'Donovan	Pat Fahy (IRE)	50/1
UR	Fence 6	Val d'Alene	8	Adam Kondrat	François Doumen (FR)	10/1

* The distances between the horses are shown in lengths or shorter. UR = unseated rider; PU = pulled-up.
† Trainers are based in Great Britain unless indicated.
Note: Due to poor ground conditions the race was run partly on the Old Course, and during its running there were 19 fences to jump.

== Winner's details ==
Further details of the winner, Master Oats:

- Foaled: 1986 in Great Britain
- Sire: Oats; Dam: Miss Poker Face (Raise You Ten)
- Owner: Paul Matthews
- Breeder: Mr and Mrs R. F. Knipe
