= 1994 Cheltenham Gold Cup =

The 1994 Cheltenham Gold Cup was a horse race which took place at Cheltenham on Thursday 17 March 1994. It was the 67th running of the Cheltenham Gold Cup, and it was won by The Fellow. The winner was ridden by Adam Kondrat and trained by François Doumen. The pre-race favourite Jodami finished second.

The Fellow won the Gold Cup at his fourth attempt, and he was the first ever winner of the race trained in France.

This was to be the final year BBC television broadcast the race.

== Race details ==
- Sponsor: Tote
- Winner's prize money: £118,770.00
- Going: Good
- Number of runners: 15
- Winner's time: 6m 40.7s

== Full result ==
	*	Horse	Age	Jockey	Trainer ^{†}	SP
1		The Fellow	9	Adam Kondrat	François Doumen (FR)	7/1
2	1½	Jodami	9	Mark Dwyer	Peter Beaumont	6/4 fav
3	4	Young Hustler	7	Carl Llewellyn	Nigel Twiston-Davies	20/1
4	¾	Flashing Steel	9	Jamie Osborne	John Mulhern (IRE)	10/1
5	5	Bradbury Star	9	Declan Murphy	Josh Gifford	5/1
6	1½	Docklands Express	12	Dean Gallagher	Kim Bailey	14/1
7	6	Miinnehoma	11	Adrian Maguire	Martin Pipe	11/1
8	shd	Deep Bramble	7	Peter Niven	Michael Hourigan (IRE)	20/1
9	4	Run for Free	10	Mark Perrett	Martin Pipe	11/1
10	2½	Topsham Bay	11	Jimmy Frost	David Barons	100/1
11	1	Chatam	10	Graham McCourt	Martin Pipe	33/1
PU	Fence 20	Garrison Savannah	11	Graham Bradley	Jenny Pitman	50/1
PU	Fence 19	Blazing Walker	10	Chris Grant	Peter Cheeseborough	20/1
PU	Fence 18	Capability Brown	7	Mick Fitzgerald	Martin Pipe	200/1
UR	Fence 17	Ebony Jane (mare)	9	Charlie Swan	Francis Flood (IRE)	100/1

* The distances between the horses are shown in lengths or shorter. shd = short-head; PU = pulled-up; UR = unseated rider.
† Trainers are based in Great Britain unless indicated.

== Winner's details ==
Further details of the winner, The Fellow:

- Foaled: 2 May 1985 in France
- Sire: Italic; Dam: L'Oranaise (Paris Jour)
- Owner: Marquesa Soledad de Moratalla
- Breeder: Mlle A. M. Gaulin
