= 1993 Cheltenham Gold Cup =

Horse race

The 1993 Cheltenham Gold Cup was a horse race that took place at Cheltenham on Thursday March 18, 1993. It was the 66th running of the Cheltenham Gold Cup, and it was won by Jodami. The winner was ridden by Mark Dwyer and trained by Peter Beaumont. The pre-race favourite The Fellow finished fourth.

Jodami was the first winner of the Gold Cup trained in northern England since The Thinker in 1987.

Cherrykino who died as a result of his fall was the last remaining relative of Arkle.

== Race details ==
- Sponsor: Tote
- Winner's prize money: £99,448.00
- Going: Good to Firm
- Number of runners: 16
- Winner's time: 6m 34.6s

== Full result ==
	*	Horse	Age	Jockey	Trainer ^{†}	SP
1		Jodami	8	Mark Dwyer	Peter Beaumont	8/1
2	2	Rushing Wild	8	Richard Dunwoody	Martin Pipe	11/1
3	7	Royal Athlete	10	Ben de Haan	Jenny Pitman	66/1
4	½	The Fellow	8	Adam Kondrat	François Doumen (FR)	5/4 fav
5	4	Sibton Abbey	8	Steve Smith Eccles	Ferdy Murphy	22/1
6	¾	Docklands Express	11	Jamie Osborne	Kim Bailey	8/1
7	10	Garrison Savannah	10	Mark Pitman	Jenny Pitman	25/1
8	5	Run for Free	9	Mark Perrett	Martin Pipe	11/1
9	3½	Cool Ground	11	Adrian Maguire	Toby Balding	50/1
10	2½	Tipping Tim	8	David Bridgwater	Nigel Twiston-Davies	25/1
11	8	Chatam	9	Peter Scudamore	Martin Pipe	10/1
12	¾	Topsham Bay	10	Jimmy Frost	David Barons	200/1
13		Cahervillahow	9	Charlie Swan	Mouse Morris (IRE)	14/1
Fell	Fence 20	Black Humour	9	Graham Bradley	Charlie Brooks	66/1
PU	Fence 20	Very Very Ordinary	7	Robbie Supple	John Upson	66/1
Fell	Fence 7	Cherrykino	8	Hywel Davies	Tim Forster	16/1

* The distances between the horses are shown in lengths or shorter. PU = pulled-up.
† Trainers are based in Great Britain unless indicated.

== Winner's details ==
Further details of the winner, Jodami:

- Foaled: 1985 in Ireland
- Sire: Crash Course; Dam: Masterstown Lucy (Bargello)
- Owner: John Yeadon
- Breeder: Eamon Phelan
