= 1994 Champion Hurdle =

65th Champion Hurdle
- Champion Hurdle
- Location: Cheltenham Racecourse
- Date: 15 March 1994
- Winning horse: Flakey Dove (GB)
- Jockey: Mark Dwyer
- Trainer: Richard Price (GB)
- Owner: J. T. Price

The 1994 Champion Hurdle was a horse race held at Cheltenham Racecourse on Tuesday 15 March 1994. It was the 65th running of the Champion Hurdle.

The winner was J. T. Price's Flakey Dove, an eight-year-old bay mare trained in Herefordshire by Richard Price and ridden by Mark Dwyer. Flakey Dove's victory was a first in the race for jockey, trainer and owner and the third in the race for a female racehorse after African Sister in 1939 and Dawn Run in 1984.

Flakey Dove was a non-Thoroughbred mare, who had made steady improvement since finishing seventh in the 1993 Champion Hurdle and emerged as a legitimate contender for the following year's renewal with wins in the Champion Hurdle Trial, Cleeve Hurdle, then a Grade 1 race run over 2 miles and 5 furlongs, and Berkshire Hurdle in early 1994. Starting at odds of 9/1 she won the Champion Hurdle by one and a half lengths from the favourite Oh So Risky with Large Action in third place. Two previous winners of the race took part: Granville Again finished seventh, whilst Morley Street was pulled up after four hurdles. Eleven of the fifteen runners completed the course.

== Race details ==
- Sponsor: Smurfit
- Purse: £166,742; First prize: £99,933
- Going: Good to Soft
- Distance: 2 miles 110 yards
- Number of runners: 15
- Winner's time: 4m 02.30

== Full result ==
Pos.	Marg.	Horse (bred)	Age	Jockey	Trainer (Country)	Odds
1		Flakey Dove (GB)	8	Mark Dwyer	Richard Price (GB)	9/1
2	1½	Oh So Risky (GB)	7	Paul Holley	David Elsworth (GB)	9/4 fav
3	¾	Large Action (IRE)	6	Jamie Osborne	Oliver Sherwood (GB)	8/1
4	4½	Mole Board (GB)	12	Tom Grantham	Jim Old (GB)	40/1
5	5	Absalom's Lady (GB)	6	Simon McNeill	David Elsworth (GB)	33/1
6	nk	Muse (GB)	7	Mark Richards	David Elsworth (GB)	13/2
7	3½	Granville Again (GB)	8	Jimmy Frost	Martin Pipe (GB)	10/1
8	2½	Shawiya (IRE)	5	Charlie Swan	M. J. P. O'Brien (IRE)	16/1
9	4	Halkopous (GB)	8	Declan Murphy	Mark Tompkins (GB)	13/2
10	25	Valfinet (FR)	7	Jonothon Lower	Martin Pipe (GB)	33/1
11	7	High Baron (GB)	7	Michael Hourigan	Robert Alner (GB)	66/1
Fell		Merchant House (IRE)	6	Richard Guest	R. J. Weaver (GB)	250/1
Fell		Land Afar (GB)	7	Warren Marston	John Webber (GB)	25/1
PU		Morley Street (GB)	10	Graham Bradley	Toby Balding (GB)	16/1
PU		King Credo (GB)	9	Adrian Maguire	Steve Woodman (GB)	16/1

- Abbreviations: nse = nose; nk = neck; hd = head; dist = distance; UR = unseated rider; PU = pulled up; LFT = left at start; SU = slipped up; BD = brought down

== Winner's details ==
Further details of the winner, Flakey Dove

- Sex: Mare
- Foaled: 1986
- Country: United Kingdom
- Sire: Oats; Dam: Shadey Dove (Deadly Nightshade)
- Owner: J. T. Price
- Breeder: J. T. Price
