= Master Oats =

British-bred Thoroughbred racehorse

- Racing silks of Mrs Hugh Maitland-Jones and Paul Matthews
- Sire: Oats
- Grandsire: Northfields
- Dam: Miss Poker Face
- Damsire: Raise You Ten
- Sex: Gelding
- Foaled: 1986
- Country: United Kingdom
- Colour: Chestnut
- Breeder: Robin and Scarlett Knipe
- Owner: Mrs Hugh Maitland-Jones; Paul Matthews
- Trainer: Henrietta Knight; Kim Bailey
- Record: 21: 10-3-2
- Earnings: £254,399

Major wins
- Greenalls Gold Cup (1994); Rehearsal Chase (1994); Welsh National (1994); Pillar Property Chase (1995); Cheltenham Gold Cup (1995)

Master Oats (14 May 1986 – 21 May 2012) was a British Thoroughbred racehorse. A specialist steeplechaser, he ran twenty-one time and won ten races. He campaigned mainly at distances in excess of three miles and was particularly effective on soft or heavy ground. Over a period of sixteen months between November 1993 and March 1995 Master Oats won nine of his eleven races and improved from racing in minor handicaps to becoming the highest-rated staying chaser in Britain. His winning run culminated in a win in the 1995 Cheltenham Gold Cup. He also ran in three editions of the Grand National, twice carrying top weight. His later career was disrupted by injury and he failed to win again after his Gold Cup success. Master Oats was retired from racing in 1998 and died in 2012.

== Background ==
Master Oats was a chestnut horse with a narrow white stripe bred by Robin and Scarlett Knipe at the Cobhall Court Stud near Allensmore in Herefordshire. He was sired by Oats, a successful National Hunt stallion whose other progeny included the Champion Hurdle winner Flakey Dove.

Master Oats was sent to the Doncaster Sales as a foal in 1986 where he was sold for £6,000. He first raced in the colours of Mrs Hugh Maitland-Jones and was sent into training with Henrietta Knight. After one run in an amateur Point-to-point race he was moved to the Lambourn stable of Kim Bailey, who trained him throughout the rest of his racing career. Master Oats usually raced in a sheepskin noseband. Throughout his racing career, Master Oats suffered from a tendency to break blood vessels under stress, and therefore had to be trained with unusual care.

== Racing career ==
=== 1991–1992: early career ===
Unlike many steeplechasers, Master Oats never competed in National Hunt flat races or over hurdles. He ran once without success in an amateur point-to-point race before beginning his career under National Hunt rules in Novice chases. After being pulled-up at Newbury Racecourse in November, he was campaigned at minor tracks, winning at Southwell Racecourse and being place at Wolverhampton and Stratford.

After his first season, Master Oats' racing career was disrupted by injury and he was off the racecourse for eighteen months. During this time he entered into the ownership of Paul Matthews.

=== 1993/1994 season ===
Master Oats returned in November 1993 with an official rating of 107, placing him approximately sixty pounds below championship class. He began in a handicap race at Uttoxeter Racecourse and won by a length and a half despite breaking a blood vessel. This was the first occasion on which he was ridden by Norman Williamson who became his regular jockey. In late December he won a similar event at Huntingdon Racecourse by twelve lengths under top weight of 165 pounds and then finished second at Wincanton in January. Later that month he won a handicap at Lingfield Park by two lengths despite being eased down by Williamson at the finish. Master Oats' rating had moved up to 137 by this time although his most valuable race win had earned bis owners less than £4,000.

Master Oats' next race saw him take on much stronger opposition in the Greenalls Gold Cup over three and a half miles at Kempton Park (moved from Haydock Park because of bad weather). The race was considered a trial for the Grand National and attracted leading chasers including Garrison Savannah (Cheltenham Gold Cup), Young Hustler (RSA Chase) and Moorcroft Boy (Scottish Grand National). Williamson sent Master Oats into the lead four fences from the finish and the gelding "turned the race into a procession" (according to The Independent) staying on strongly on the soft ground to win by fifteen lengths. At Aintree Racecourse on 9 April, Master Oats started third favourite of the thirty-six runners in the 1994 Grand National at odds of 9/1, and was expected to be ideally suited by the heavy ground. Master Oats appeared to be going well and was moving up towards the leaders when he fell at the thirteenth fence of the race won by Miinnehoma. The horse was not injured and returned two weeks later to end his season with a very easy win under top weight in a race at Perth.

=== 1994/1995 season ===
Master Oats first run of the 1994/95 season saw him pitted against the 1992 Cheltenham Gold Cup winner Cool Ground and the 1992 Grand National winner Party Politics in the Rehearsal Chase at Chepstow. He took the lead at the eleventh fence and stayed on to repel the challenge of Party Politics by four lengths. On New Year's Eve Master Oats started 5/2 joint favourite for the Welsh National over three and three quarter miles on heavy ground. The race was moved to Newbury from its traditional venue at Chepstow, where racing had been abandoned owing to the weather and ground conditions. Williamson sent him into the lead four fences from the finish and the horse steadily increased his lead to win by twenty lengths from Earth Summit. After the race he was heavily backed for the Cheltenham Gold Cup, and bookmakers responded by cutting his odds from 16/1 to 9/2 favourite. The ground remained heavy in January when Master Oats contested the Pillar Property Chase at Cheltenham, starting favourite ahead of the King George VI Chase winner Barton Bank. On his first appearance at the course, Master Oats went clear of his opponents two fences from the finish and won by fifteen lengths from the mare Dubacilla with Barton Bank third. Following this race Timeform rated Master Oats as the best long-distance chaser in training by a margin of six pounds and described him as looking "all over a Gold Cup winner".

Master Oats went to the 1995 Cheltenham Festival having won four consecutive long distance chases, all on soft or heavy ground. In the Cheltenham Gold Cup he was reopposed by Barton Bank, Dubacilla, Young Hustler and Miinnehoma, but his biggest rival in the betting was Jodami who had won the race in 1993 and finished second to The Fellow in 1994. The ground conditions were among the most testing ever seen at the course and one fence was omitted for safety reasons. Master Oats jumped poorly in the early stages but recovered to take the lead two fences out, overtaking the Irish challenger Merry Gale. He had established a clear lead at the final obstacle and stayed on strongly up the Cheltenham hill to win by fifteen lengths from Dubacilla. The win made Bailey and Williamson the first trainer-jockey combination in forty-five years to win the two most important races at the festival, having won the Champion Hurdle with Alderbrook two days earlier. Williamson, who admitted to having been concerned in the early stages, celebrated with a flying dismount before describing the win as "what I've dreamed of all my life."

A change in the weather meant that the soft ground which had prevailed throughout the season had changed to "good" ground by the time that the 1995 Grand National was run three and a half weeks later. Despite the unfavourable ground and top weight of 164 pounds, Master Oats started 5/1 favourite against thirty-four opponents. Williamson positioned the gelding on the far outside of the field and moved forward into second place behind the eventual winner Royal Athlete at Becher's Brook on the second circuit. Master Oats was still in second at the penultimate obstacle, but faded in the closing stages to finish seventh, sixteen lengths behind the winner. Bailey later said that Master Oats was in better form for the National than he had been in the Gold Cup and that "if he'd had his [soft] ground, he would have won by half the track."

=== 1995–1997: later career ===
Master Oats' subsequent career was a disappointment, as he never reproduced the form he showed in 1994 and early 1995. On his first start of the 1995/1996 season he ran inexplicably badly before being pulled up in the Rehearsal Chase. He finished a distant third to One Man in the King George VI Chase at Sandown Park in January 1996 and second to Imperial Call when favourite for the Hennessy Gold Cup a month later. He then sustained a leg injury which prevented him from defending the Gold Cup and ruled him out for the rest of the season.

After a break of more than a year, Master Oats returned to racing with the Grand National as his objective. He started favourite for the Grand National Trial Chase at Punchestown Racecourse in February 1997 but was pulled up three fences from the finish. Despite his lack of recent success, he was again allotted top weight of 164 pounds for the 1997 Grand National. He ran well for much of the way before finishing fifth of the thirty-six runners behind Lord Gyllene. According to Williamson, "Only sheer courage got him home. He was knackered but it was almost as good as winning." The following year, Master Oats was taking part in a hunt when he sustained a serious tendon injury which ended his racing career.

== Retirement ==
Master Oats spent his retirement at the home of Lord Leigh near Adlestrop in Gloucestershire, where he was reportedly popular with the villagers. In 2010, he took part in a parade of former champions at the Cheltenham Festival. Master Oats died of a heart attack on 21 May 2012 at the age of twenty-six and was buried at Adlestrop.

== Assessment and honours ==
In their book, A Century of Champions, based on the Timeform rating system, John Randall and Tony Morris rated Master Oats a "superior" Gold Cup winner and the twenty-third best steeplechaser of the 20th century.

== Pedigree ==
Pedigree of Master Oats (GB), chestnut gelding, 1986
| Sire Oats (IRE) 1973 | Northfields; 1968 | Northern Dancer | Nearctic |
| Sire Oats (IRE) 1973 | Northfields; 1968 | Northern Dancer | Natalma |
| Sire Oats (IRE) 1973 | Northfields; 1968 | Little Hut | Occupy |
| Sire Oats (IRE) 1973 | Northfields; 1968 | Little Hut | Savage Beauty |
| Sire Oats (IRE) 1973 | Arctic Lace; 1966 | Arctic Chevalier | Arctic Star |
| Sire Oats (IRE) 1973 | Arctic Lace; 1966 | Arctic Chevalier | French Ballet |
| Sire Oats (IRE) 1973 | Arctic Lace; 1966 | Alace | Rapace |
| Sire Oats (IRE) 1973 | Arctic Lace; 1966 | Alace | Fair Alycia |
| Dam Miss Poker Face (GB) 1970 | Raise You Ten; 1960 | Tehran | Bois Roussel |
| Dam Miss Poker Face (GB) 1970 | Raise You Ten; 1960 | Tehran | Stafarella |
| Dam Miss Poker Face (GB) 1970 | Raise You Ten; 1960 | Visor | Combat |
| Dam Miss Poker Face (GB) 1970 | Raise You Ten; 1960 | Visor | Eyewash |
| Dam Miss Poker Face (GB) 1970 | Leonina; 1953 | Royal Charger | Nearco |
| Dam Miss Poker Face (GB) 1970 | Leonina; 1953 | Royal Charger | Sun Princess |
| Dam Miss Poker Face (GB) 1970 | Leonina; 1953 | Windway | Fairway |
| Dam Miss Poker Face (GB) 1970 | Leonina; 1953 | Windway | Windfall (Family: 10) |
