= Midlands Grand National =

Steeplechase horse race in Britain

- Class: Premier Handicap
- Location: Uttoxeter Racecourse, Uttoxeter, Staffordshire, England
- Inaugurated: 1969
- Race type: Steeplechase
- Sponsor: JenningsBet
- Website: uttoxeter-racecourse.co.uk

Race information
- Distance: 4m 2f 8y (6,847 metres)
- Surface: Turf
- Qualification: Five-years-old and up
- Weight: Handicap; Maximum: 12 st
- Purse: £160,000 (2025); 1st: £90,032

Midlands Grand National
2026
Isaac Des Obeaux	Rock My Way	Git Maker

Previous years
2025
Mr Vango	Tanganyika	Passing Well
2024
Beauport	Mr Incredible	My Silver Lining
2023
Major Dundee	Tile Tapper	Notachance
2022
Screaming Colours	Young Dev	Time To Get Up
2021
Time To Get Up	Mighty Thunder	Final Nudge

2020-2011
2020
Truckers Lodge	Captain Drake	Joe Farrell
2019
Potters Corner	Ms Parfois	Get On The Yager
2018
Regal Flow	Milansbar	Ballymalin
2017
Chase The Spud	Mysteree	Warrantor
2016
Firebird Flyer	Milansbar	Cogry
2015
Goonyella	Raz De Maree	Woodford County
2014
Goulanes	Alpha Victor	West End Rocker
2013
Big Occasion	Rebeccas Choice	One in a Milan
2012
Master Overseer	Major Malarkey	Ballyfitz
2011
Minella Four Star	Ballyfitz	Synchronised

2010-2001
2010
Synchronised	L'aventure	Giles Cross
2009
Russian Trigger	Flintoff	Hold The Pin
2008
Himalayan Trail	Badgerlaw	The Dark Lord
2007
Baron Windrush	D'Argent	Newbay Prop
2006
G V A Ireland	Ossmoses	L'aventure
2005
Philson Run	Toulouse-Lautrec	Howdydoody
2003
Intelligent	Akarus	Jurancon II
2002
The Bunny Boiler	Mini Sensation	Scotton Green

2000-1991
2000
Ackzo	Flaked Oats	Scotton Green
1999
Young Kenny	Call It A Day	Hollybank Buck
1998
Miss Orchestra	Kamikaze	Another Excuse
1997
Seven Towers	Lord Gyllene	Sister Stephanie
1996
Another Excuse	Feathered Gale	Moorcroft Boy
1995
Lucky Lane	Arthur's Minstrel	Scribbler
1994
Glenbrook D'Or	Its A Cracker	Callmecha
1993
Mister Ed	Into The Red	Do Be Brief
1992
Laura's Beau	Mr Boston	Willsford
1991
Bonanza Boy	Rubika	Four Trix

1990-1988
1990
Willsford	Pembrokeshire Lad	The Langholm Dyer
1989
Gallic Prince	Abba Lad	Mithras
1988
Knock Hill	Cranlome	Team Challenge

The Midlands Grand National is a Premier Handicap National Hunt race in Great Britain. It is a handicap steeplechase and is run at Uttoxeter Racecourse in March, over a distance of about 4 miles and 2 furlongs (4 miles, 2 furlongs and 8 yards, or 6,847 metres). During the race there are 25 fences to be jumped. The race held Listed status until 2022 and was re-classified as a Premier Handicap from the 2023 running when Listed status was removed from handicap races.

== History ==
The first race was run on 3 May 1969. The race was initially run over 4m2f and was increased to 4m4f in 1977. During this period it would have been, assuming accurate measurements, by 24 yards or approximately the length of a cricket pitch, the longest race in the NH calendar. In 1991 the distance was dropped to 4m, before being upped to 4m2f in 1993. The distance of the race was then reduced to 4m1½f in 2004 before being returned to 4m2f in 2018. It is now the second-longest race in the British calendar, after the Grand National at Aintree.

The 1977 winner Watafella finished third in the race but was promoted to first place after the first and second, No Scotch and Evander were disqualified after it was realised they failed to meet the conditions of the race, along with three other runners.

In the early days it was run on the first Saturday in May, then in late April until 1990

The race was not covered on television in its early years but was shown by Channel 4 from 1991 until 1997. The BBC took over coverage between 1998 and 2005 having earlier televised the race 3 times in the 1970s 1971, 1972 and 1977 before the race returned to Channel 4, who continued to show it until their coverage of British racing ended in 2016. It is now broadcast on ITV Racing.

== Records ==
Most successful horse:

- no horse has won the race more than once

Leading jockey (2 wins):

- Ken White – Happy Spring (1969), Rip’s Lyric (1973)
- Derek Morris – Midnight Madness (1987), Mister Ed (1993)
- Brendan Powell – Another Excuse (1996), Young Kenny (1999)
- Norman Williamson – Lucky Lane (1995), The Bunny Boiler (2002)

Leading trainer (4 wins):

- David Pipe – Minella Four Star (2011), Master Overseer (2012), Big Occasion (2013), Goulanes (2014)
- Widest winning margin – Another Excuse (1996) – distance
- Narrowest winning margin – Fighting Chance (1974), Knock Hill (1988) – head
- Most runners – 22, in 1978, 1979 and 1981
- Fewest runners – 6, in 2000

== Winners ==
Year	Winner	Age	Weight	Jockey	Trainer
1969	Happy Spring	13	09–11	Ken White	J Wright
1970	Two Springs	8	10-06	Roy Edwards	G Owen
1971	Grey Sombrero	7	09-07	Graham Thorner	David Gandolfo
1972	Proud Percy	9	10-00	Gerald Faulkner	Arthur Stephenson
1973	Rip's Lyric	8	10-06	Ken White	W Whiston
1974	Fighting Chance	6	09-08	Bill Shoemark	Gay Kindersley
1975	Rag Trade	9	10-10	John Burke	Arthur Pitt
1976	Burrator	7	10-01	Mr John Docker (Note: amateur jockey)	Alan Jarvis
1977	Watafella	7	09-11	Bryan Smart	Jenny Pitman
1978	Kick On	11	10-08	Ron Hyett	Keith Lewis
1979	Jimmy Miff	7	09-10	Stephen Kemble	Ian Wardle
1980	Pacify	10	10-00	Steve Jobar	Stan Mellor
1981	Master Brutus	9	10-02	John Goulding	Caroline Mason
1982	Bridge Ash	9	10–13	Keith Johnson	Ivor Johnson
	no race 1983 (Note: The 1983 running was cancelled due to a waterlogged track)
1984	Mr Mole	9	10-00	Allen Webb	John Webber
1985	Northern Bay	9	11-10	Philip Hobbs	Tom Bill
1986	The Thinker	8	11-06	Ridley Lamb	Arthur Stephenson
1987	Midnight Madness	9	09-13	Derek Morris	Dai Bloomfield
1988	Knock Hill	12	11-07	George Mernagh	John Webber
1989	Gallic Prince	10	10-01	Peter Hobbs	Philip Hobbs
1990	Willsford	7	11-00	Mark Pitman	Jenny Pitman
1991	Bonanza Boy	10	11-10	Peter Scudamore	Martin Pipe
1992	Laura's Beau	8	10-08	Conor O'Dwyer	Francis Berry
1993	Mister Ed	10	10-03	Derek Morris	Roger Curtis
1994	Glenbrook d'Or	10	10-00	Brian Clifford	Jim Wilson
1995	Lucky Lane	11	10-00	Norman Williamson	Philip Hobbs
1996	Another Excuse	8	10-00	Brendan Powell, snr	Eugene O'Sullivan
1997	Seven Towers	8	11-04	Peter Niven	Mary Reveley
1998	Miss Orchestra	7	09-09	Barry Geraghty	Jessica Harrington
1999	Young Kenny	8	11-06	Brendan Powell, snr	Peter Beaumont
2000	Ackzo	7	10-00	Adrian Maguire	Ferdy Murphy
	no race 2001 (Note: The 2001 running was cancelled due to a foot-and-mouth crisis)
2002	The Bunny Boiler	8	10-00	Norman Williamson	Noel Meade
2003	Intelligent	7	10-10	Robbie Power	Jessica Harrington
	no race 2004 (Note: The 2004 running was cancelled due to high winds)
2005	Philson Run	9	10-02	Paul Carberry	Nick Williams
2006	G V A Ireland	8	10-03	Ruby Walsh	Francis Flood
2007	Baron Windrush	9	10-09	Jason Maguire	Nigel Twiston-Davies
2008	Himalayan Trail	9	10–00	Tjade Collier	Sue Smith
2009	Russian Trigger	7	10–12	Jack Doyle	Victor Dartnall
2010	Synchronised	7	11-05	Tony McCoy	Jonjo O'Neill
2011	Minella Four Star	8	10-00	Conor O'Farrell	David Pipe
2012	Master Overseer	9	10-03	Tom Scudamore	David Pipe
2013	Big Occasion	6	09-07	Mikey Ennis	David Pipe
2014	Goulanes	8	10-03	Richard Johnson	David Pipe
2015	Goonyella	8	10–12	Jonnny Burke	Jim Dreaper
2016	Firebird Flyer	9	11-05	Adam Wedge	Evan Williams
2017	Chase The Spud	9	10–12	Paddy Brennan	Fergal O'Brien
2018	Regal Flow	11	10-12	Sean Houlihan	Bob Buckler
2019	Potters Corner	9	10-07	James Bowen	Christian Williams
2020	Truckers Lodge	8	10-07	Lorcan Williams	Paul Nicholls
2021	Time To Get Up	8	10-10	Jonjo O'Neill Jnr	Jonjo O'Neill
2022	Screaming Colours	11	10-06	Conor Orr	William Durkan
2023	Major Dundee	8	10-02	Rex Dingle	Alan King
2024	Beauport	8	11-04	Jordan Nailor	Nigel Twiston-Davies
2025	Mr Vango	9	12-00	Jack Tudor	Sara Bradstock
2026	Isaac Des Obeaux	8	11-08	Sam Twiston-Davies	Paul Nicholls

== See also ==
- Horse racing in Great Britain
- List of British National Hunt races
