= 1995 Champion Hurdle =

66th Champion Hurdle
- Champion Hurdle
- Location: Cheltenham Racecourse
- Date: 14 March 1995
- Winning horse: Alderbrook (GB)
- Jockey: Norman Williamson
- Trainer: Kim Bailey (GB)
- Owner: Ernie Pick

The 1995 Champion Hurdle was a horse race held at Cheltenham Racecourse on Tuesday 14 March 1995. It was the 66th running of the Champion Hurdle.

The winner was Ernie Pick's Alderbrook, a six-year-old bay stallion trained in Gloucestershire by Kim Bailey and ridden by Norman Williamson. Alderbrook's victory was a first in the race for jockey, trainer and owner.

Alderbrook was a top-class flat racer, who won the Group Three Select Stakes and finished second in the Group One Prix Ganay. The Champion Hurdle was his third race under National Hunt rules after an unplaced run in a novice hurdle in 1992 and a win in the Kingwell Hurdle nineteen days before the championship. Starting at odds of 11/2 he won the Champion Hurdle by five lengths and two lengths from the joint-favourites Large Action and Danoli. The only previous winner of the race to take part was Granville Again who finished last. Twelve of the fourteen runners completed the course.

== Race details ==
- Sponsor: Smurfit
- Purse: £172,792; First prize: £103,690
- Going: Soft
- Distance: 2 miles 110 yards
- Number of runners: 14
- Winner's time: 4m 03.10

== Full result ==
Pos.	Marg.	Horse (bred)	Age	Jockey	Trainer (Country)	Odds
1		Alderbrook (GB)	6	Norman Williamson	Kim Bailey (GB)	11/2
2	5	Large Action (IRE)	7	Jamie Osborne	Oliver Sherwood (GB)	4/1 jt-fav
3	2	Danoli (IRE)	7	Charlie Swan	Tom Foley (IRE)	4/1 jt-fav
4	hd	Fortune And Fame (IRE)	8	Mark Dwyer	Dermot Weld (IRE)	5/1
5	1	Mysilv (GB)	5	Graham Bradley	Charles Egerton (GB)	20/1
6	7	Absalom's Lady (GB)	7	Simon McNeill	David Elsworth (GB)	33/1
7	¾	Atours (USA)	7	Paul Holley	David Elsworth (GB)	14/1
8	¾	Mole Board (GB)	13	Tom Grantham	Jim Old (GB)	16/1
9	5	Montelado	9	F. Woods	Patrick Flynn (IRE)	10/1
10	11	Jazilah (FR)	7	Richard Dunwoody	Martin Pipe (GB)	66/1
11	25	Destriero (GB)	7	K. O'Brien	Noel Furlong (IRE)	33/1
12	1½	Granville Again (IRE)	9	Mick Fitzgerald	Muriel Naughton (GB)	100/1
Fell		Land Afar (GB)	8	Graham McCourt	John Webber (GB)	25/1
PU		Bold Boss (GB)	6	Jonothon Lower	Martin Pipe (GB)	50/1

- Abbreviations: nse = nose; nk = neck; hd = head; dist = distance; UR = unseated rider; PU = pulled up; LFT = left at start; SU = slipped up; BD = brought down

== Winner's details ==
Further details of the winner, Alderbrook

- Sex: Stallion
- Foaled: 27 April 1989
- Country: United Kingdom
- Sire: Ardross; Dam: Twine (Thatching)
- Owner: Ernie Pick
- Breeder: J. H. Stone
