= Grand National Trial =

Steeplechase horse race in Britain

Grand National Trial
2025
Famous Bridge	Apple Away	Val Dancer

Previous years
2024
Yeah Man	My Silver Lining	Iron Bridge
2023
Quick Wave	Snow Leopardess	Cloudy Glen
2022
The Galloping Bear	Bristol De Mai	Time To Get Up
2021
Lord Du Mesnil	Achille	The Two Amigos

2020-2011
2020
Smooth Stepper	Lord Du Mesnil	Yala Enki
2019
Robinsfirth	Ramses De Teillee	Chef D'Oeuvre
2018
Yala Enki	Blaklion	Mysteree
2017
Vieux Lion Rouge	Blaklion	Vintage Clouds
2016
Bishops Road	Broadway Buffalo	Cloudy Too
2015
Lie Forrit	Harry The Viking	Monbeg Dude
2014
Rigadin De Beauchene	Emperor's Choice	Loch Ba
2013
Well Refreshed	Rigadin De Beauchene	Monbeg Dude
2012
Giles Cross	Neptune Collonges	Le Beau Bai
2011
Silver By Nature	Ballyfitz	Le Beau Bai

2010-2001
2010
Silver By Nature	Our Vic	Le Beau Bai
2009
Rambling Minster	Coe	Miko de Beauchene
2008
Miko de Beauchene	Flintoff	L'aventure
2007
Heltornic	L'aventure	Mon Mome
2006
Ossmoses	Model Son	Sir Rembrandt
2005
Forest Gunner	Double Honour	Kelami
2004
Jurancon II	Bear on Board	Artic Jack
2003
Shotgun Willy	You're Agoodun	Iris Bleu
2001
Frantic Tan	Jocks Cross	Take Control

2000-1991
2000
The Last Fling	Niki Dee	Tullymurry Toff
1999
Young Kenny	Fiddling The Facts	Him of Praise
1998
Dom Samourai	Him of Praise	Strath Royal
1997
Suny Bay	Into The Red	St Mellion Fairway
1996
Lo Stregone	Tartan Tyrant	Willsford
1995
Nuaffe	Riverside Boy	Superior Finish
1993
Party Politics	Fiddlers Pike	Willsford
1992
Cool Ground	Kildimo	Twin Oaks
1991
Twin Oaks	Bonanza Boy	Aquilifer

The Grand National Trial is a Premier Handicap National Hunt steeplechase in Great Britain which is open to horses aged five years or older. It is run at Haydock Park over a distance of about 3 miles and 4½ furlongs (3 miles, 4 furlongs and 97 yards, or 5,721 metres ), and during its running there are twenty-two fences to be jumped. It is a handicap race, and it is scheduled to take place each year in February.

The event was established in 1947 and took place every year until 1984. From 1985 to 1990 there was no race at the meeting over this distance, but in 1991 the Greenall Whitley Gold Cup was increased in distance from 3 miles (4,828 metres) to 3 miles and 4 furlongs (5,633 metres), effectively recreating the original Haydock Grand National Trial. The Grand National Trial name was readopted in 1996. Subsequent sponsors included De Vere Group, Red Square Vodka and Blue Square, the race title suffixing the sponsor's name with "Gold Cup".

The Tote took over sponsorship from the 2011 running and the race title was changed to the totesport.com Grand National trial. As the name implies, the race serves as an important trial for the Grand National. It is now sponsored by William Hill. The race held Grade 3 status until 2022 and was re-classified as a Premier Handicap from the 2023 running when Grade 3 status was renamed by the British Horseracing Authority.

== Winners ==
- Weights given in stones and pounds.

Year	Winner	Age	Weight	Jockey	Trainer
1947	Abandoned because of snow and frost
1948	Gallery	10	11-03	Michael Prendergast	W Bissill
1949	Freebooter	8	11-11	Tim Molony	Bobby Renton
1950	Abandoned because of snow and frost
1951	Cardinal Error	7	11–12	Dick Curran	John Wright
1952	Abandoned because of frost
1953	Witty	8	10-09	George Slack	Charlie Hall
1954	Abandoned because of snow and frost
1955	Goosander	7	11-04	A Thompson	Neville Crump
1956	Sundew	10	11-10	Fred Winter	F Hudson
1957	Goosander	9	11-08	Johnny East	Neville Crump
1958	Giles Farnaby	12	09-07	Gerry Madden	T Lord
1959	Abandoned because of frost
1960	Highland Dandy	8	10-03	Robin Langley	George Owen
1961	Uncle Isaac	8	10-05	Charlie Scott (Note: amateur jockey)	Thomas Scott
1962	Solfen	10	12-00	Toss Taaffe	W O'Grady (Ir)
1963	Abandoned because of snow
1964	Reproduction	11	09-07	Stan Mellor	G Owen
1965	Abandoned because of frost
1966	The Ringer	7	10–11	Paddy Broderick	Arthur Stephenson
1967	Bassnet	8	10–12	David Nicholson	A Kilpatrick
1968	Abandoned due to foot and mouth outbreak
1969	Game Purston	11	10-01	Ken White	Matt McCourt
1970	French Excuse	8	10-01	Ken White	Fred Rimell
1971	The Otter	10	10-01	T M Jones	R Dening
1972	Rouge Autumn	8	10–13	Ken White	Fred Rimell
1973	Highland Seal	10	10-00	Richard Dennard	R Dening
1974	Abandoned because of waterlogged state of course
1975	Red Rum	10	12-00	Brian Fletcher	Ginger McCain
1976	Forest King	7	10-07	David Munro	Ken Hogg
1977	Andy Pandy	8	10–13	John Burke	Fred Rimell
1978	Tregarron	11	10-07	Jonjo O'Neill	Ken Oliver
1979	Abandoned because of frost
1980	Narvik	7	10-00	Colin Hawkins	Neville Crump
1981	Abandoned because of waterlogged state of course
1982	Abandoned because of frost and snow
1983	Ashley House	9	10-01	Robert Earnshaw	Michael Dickinson
1984	Abandoned because of frost
1985– 1990	No race
1991	Twin Oaks	11	11-00	Neale Doughty	Gordon W. Richards
1992	Cool Ground	10	11-03	Adrian Maguire	Toby Balding
1993	Party Politics	9	11-07	Carl Llewellyn	Nick Gaselee
1994	Master Oats (Note: The 1994 running took place at Kempton Park)	8	10-02	Norman Williamson	Kim Bailey
1995	Nuaffe	10	11-00	Sean O'Donovan	Pat Fahy
1996	Lo Stregone	10	10-00	Charlie Swan	Tom Tate
1997	Suny Bay	8	10-08	Jamie Osborne	Charlie Brooks
1998	Dom Samourai	7	10-00	Chris Maude	Martin Pipe
1999	Young Kenny	8	10-00	Brendan Powell	Peter Beaumont
2000	The Last Fling	10	11–01	Seamus Durack	Sue Smith
2001	Frantic Tan	9	10-04	Carl Llewellyn	Nigel Twiston-Davies
2002	Abandoned due to waterlogged state of course
2003	Shotgun Willy	9	11–12	Ruby Walsh	Paul Nicholls
2004	Jurancon II	7	10-06	Joey Elliot	Martin Pipe
2005	Forest Gunner	11	10-10	Peter Buchanan	Richard Ford
2006	Ossmoses	9	10-00	Richard McGrath	Don Forster
2007	Heltornic	7	10-00	Tom Scudamore	Michael Scudamore
2008	Miko de Beauchene	8	11–12	Andrew Thornton	Robert & Sally Alner
2009	Rambling Minster	11	11-00	James Reveley	Keith Reveley
2010	Silver by Nature	8	10–11	Peter Buchanan	Lucinda Russell
2011	Silver by Nature	9	11–12	Peter Buchanan	Lucinda Russell
2012	Giles Cross	10	10-5	Denis O'Regan	Victor Dartnall
2013	Well Refreshed	9	10-03	Joshua Moore	Gary Moore
2014	Rigadin De Beauchene	9	10-05	Robbie Dunne	Venetia Williams
2015	Lie Forrit	11	11-06	Peter Buchanan	Lucinda Russell
2016	Bishops Road	8	11-07	Richard Johnson	Kerry Lee
2017	Vieux Lion Rouge	8	11-06	Tom Scudamore	David Pipe
2018	Yala Enki	8	10-11	Charlie Deutsch	Venetia Williams
2019	Robinsfirth	10	11-04	Sean Bowen	Colin Tizzard
2020	Smooth Stepper	11	10-00	Harry Bannister	Alex Hales
2021	Lord Du Mesnil	8	11-06	Paul O'Brien	Richard Hobson
2022	Bristol De Mai (Note: The Galloping Bear finished first in 2022 but was subsequently disqualified after a post-race sample found a prohibited substance)	11	11-12	Sam Twiston-Davies	Nigel Twiston-Davies
2023	Quick Wave	10	11-08	Henry Bannister	Venetia Williams
2024	Yeah Man	7	10-12	Sean Flanagan	Gavin Cromwell
2025	Famous Bridge	9	10-02	Sean Quinlan	Nicky Richards
2026	Grand Geste	7	10-12	Danny McMenamin	Joel Parkinston & Sue Smith

== See also ==
- Horse racing in Great Britain
- List of British National Hunt races
