= 1997 Grand National =

Horse race at Aintree Racecourse

- Grand National
- Location: Aintree
- Date: 7 April 1997
- Winning horse: (New Zealand) Lord Gyllene
- Starting price: 14/1
- Jockey: (Northern Ireland) Tony Dobbin
- Trainer: (England) Steve Brookshaw
- Owner: Stanley Clarke

External videos
- 1997 Grand National in full Racing UK, BBC Sport, YouTube
- Replay of the latter stages of the 1997 Grand National BBC Sport

The 1997 Grand National (known officially as the Martell Grand National and also informally as the Monday National) was the 150th official running of the Grand National steeplechase held at Aintree near Liverpool. The race was scheduled to be run on Saturday 5 April 1997, but was postponed by two days to Monday 7 April after a Provisional Irish Republican Army (IRA) bomb threat forced the evacuation of the course.

The race was won in a time of nine minutes and 5.9 seconds and by a distance of 25 lengths by New Zealand-bred Lord Gyllene at odds of 14/1. He was ridden by jockey Tony Dobbin, trained by Steve Brookshaw at his Preston Farm base in Uffington, Shropshire, and ran in the colours of Stanley Clarke. Brookshaw collected £178,146 of a total prize fund of £303,300 shared through the first six finishers. There were two equine fatalities during the race.

== Postponement ==
The race was originally scheduled to be run on Saturday 5 April at 3:45 pm. However, at 2:49 pm, a bomb threat was made via telephone to Aintree University Hospital in Fazakerley, with a second made three minutes later via telephone to the police's control room in Bootle. Both used recognised codewords of the Provisional Irish Republican Army (IRA). At least one device was warned to have been planted within Aintree Racecourse. This was one of several IRA threats in the lead up to the 1997 UK general election.

The police evacuated 60,000 people from the course, stranding 20,000 racegoers, media personnel, and those connected to the competing horses, as their vehicles remained locked inside the confines of the course. Initially, spectators were evacuated from the stands onto the course itself but after consultation with the police, course clerk Charles Barnett advised via the live broadcast that everyone would have to leave the course completely. This prompted tabloid headlines such as "We'll fight them on the Becher's", in reference to Winston Churchill's war-time speech "We shall fight on the beaches".

Most of the competing horses either travelled home or were moved to nearby Haydock. A dozen remained in the stables at Aintree.

At 4:14 pm, the police carried out two controlled explosions at the course. Fewer than 10,000 of the original crowd were expected to return for the postponed race, but over 20,000 turned out at Aintree on Monday 7 April to watch Lord Gyllene gallop to a 25-length victory, 49 hours late. In a retrospective item broadcast during ITV's coverage of the 2017 Grand National, it was revealed that another bomb threat was made on Monday. However, Merseyside Police were confident that the threat was a hoax and the race went ahead without disruption. Former Assistant Chief Constable of Merseyside Police, Sir Paul Stephenson, believed a bomb was never planted at Aintree Racecourse.

== Leading contenders ==
Go Ballistic was made favourite after finishing fourth in the Cheltenham Gold Cup three weeks before the National. The Ascot specialist was considered to have been largely undervalued in the weights and was due to go off carrying the minimum ten stones with the previous year's winning rider Mick Fitzgerald in the saddle. Fitzgerald was one of many riders unable to make the allocated weight after the two-day delay and weighed out at 10 stone and 3 lb. Go Ballistic set off at 7/1 favourite but struggled to keep pace with the leaders; he was lying a distant tenth when he broke a blood vessel approaching the penultimate fence and was pulled up.

Suny Bay was an eight-year-old whose popularity was assisted by his being a grey, but was mostly built on a victory in the Grand National Trial at Haydock in February, beating Lo Stregone. Ridden by Jamie Osborne, Suny Bay was sent off at 8/1 and ran prominently throughout but was beginning to tire when he made a bad mistake at the fourth fence from home. Although the pairing remained intact, Suny Bay was unable get on terms with the winner and finished a well-beaten second.

Wylde Hide was a ten-year-old, two-times winner of the Thyestes Chase at Gowran Park who was carrying much of the Irish support to break a 22-year run without a horse from their homeland winning the race. It was also felt that the J. P. McManus-owned gelding would have gone close had he not unseated when starting to issue a challenge at the Canal Turn second time in the 1996 race. The Arthur Moore-trained 11/1 shot failed to improve on that and was chasing the leaders when he blundered at Becher's Brook on the second circuit and unseated Charlie Swan.

Avro Anson was a nine-year-old, trained by Maurice Camacho in Malton, North Yorkshire, who was well backed despite being relatively inexperienced as a chaser with just five starts in his career. Peter Niven took the ride, being sent off at 12/1 and they still held every chance in the first half-dozen at the Canal Turn second time, but a mistake at Valentine's cost him his chance. He faded out of contention over the remaining fences before rallying late on to finish sixth, almost 40 lengths behind the winner.

Smith's Band was trained by Jenny Pitman and given the most experienced rider in the race in Richard Dunwoody, his 12th Grand National mount (including the void race of 1993). He was sent off carrying two pounds overweight at 12/1 despite having pulled up on his only start in the previous 12 months. Smith's Band disputed the lead throughout before falling at the 20th fence. He suffered a broken neck and died instantly. The other equine fatality during the race was Straight Talk, who broke a leg at the 14th fence and was put down.

Other well-backed contestants at the off were 1996 Sun Alliance Chase winner Nathen Lad, Punchestown Grand National Trial winner Antonin, 1996 Scottish Grand National runner-up General Wolfe, 1996 Irish Grand National winner Feathered Gale and the 1996 Greenall's Grand National Trial winner Lo Stregone. Eventual winner Lord Gyllene had been the anti-post favourite until a few days before the race but drifted out to 14/1 before the race.

The 11 riders making their debut in the race were all on outside chances but included two future winners, Timmy Murphy and Jim Culloty, as well as a quartet of others whose appearances would go into double figures in Richard Johnson, Robert Thornton, Joe Tizzard and David Casey. It was Sean Curran who fared best of the debut riders on the day, finishing seventh with only Murphy and Casey also completing the course. Glen Tormey and Tom Treacy also made their debuts while this was the only ride in a National for Daniel Fortt and Terry Mitchell.

== Finishing order ==
Position	Name	Jockey	Age	Weight (st, lb)	Starting price	Distance
1st	Lord Gyllene (NZL)	Tony Dobbin	9	10-00	14/1	Won by 25 lengths
2nd	Suny Bay (IRE)	Jamie Osborne	8	10-03	8/1	2 lengths
3rd	Camelot Knight	Carl Llewellyn	11	10-00	100/1	1¾ lengths
4th	Buckboard Bounce	Paul Carberry	11	10-01	40/1	1¾ lengths
5th	Master Oats	Norman Williamson	11	11-10	25/1	8 lengths
6th	Avro Anson	Peter Niven	9	10-02	12/1	7 lengths
7th	Killeshin	Sean Curran	11	10-00	33/1	9 lengths
8th	Dakyns Boy	Timmy Murphy	12	10-00	100/1	1¼ lengths
9th	Nahthen Lad (IRE)	Jason Titley	8	10-09	14/1	8 lengths
10th	Valiant Warrior	Russ Garrity	9	10-00 [10-03]	33/1	12 lengths
11th	Antonin (FRA)	Conor O'Dwyer	9	10-00	14/1	3 lengths
12th	Northern Hide	Paul Holley	11	10-00 [10-01]	66/1	22 lengths
13th	Turning Trix	John Kavanagh	10	10-00	25/1	13 lengths
14th	Pink Gin	Mr. Chris Bonner	10	10-00	100/1	6 lengths
15th	New Co (IRE)	David Casey	9	10-00	40/1	6 lengths
16th	General Wolfe	Lorcan Wyer	8	10-00	16/1	A distance
17th	Evangelica (USA)	Robbie Supple	7	10-00	33/1	Last to complete

Note: Weights in square-brackets indicate overweight.

== Non-finishers ==
Fence	Name	Jockey	Age	Weight (st, lb)	Starting price	Fate
1st	Full of Oats	Jim Culloty	11	10-00	33/1	Fell
7th (Foinavon's)	Back Bar (IRE)	Tom Treacy	9	10-00	100/1	Brought Down
7th (Foinavon's)	Glemot (IRE)	Simon McNeill	9	10-00	50/1	Hampered, unseated rider
11th	Nuaffe	Terry Mitchell	12	10-00	100/1	Fell
13th	Don't Light Up	Robert Thornton	11	10-00	100/1	Unseated Rider
14th	Straight Talk	Joe Tizzard	10	10-00 [10-03]	50/1	Fell
15th (The Chair)	Celtic Abbey	Richard Johnson	9	10-00	66/1	Unseated rider
20th	Smith's Band (IRE)	Richard Dunwoody	9	10-00 [10-02]	12/1	Fell
21st	Mugoni Beach	Glen Tormey	12	10-00	100/1	Pulled up
21st	River Mandate	Andrew Thornton	10	10-00 [10-01]	50/1	Pulled up
21st	Scribbler	Daniel Fortt	11	10-00 [10-02]	100/1	Tailed off, pulled up
22nd (Becher's Brook)	Spuffington	Philip Hide	9	10-00 [10-02]	100/1	Unseated rider
22nd (Becher's Brook)	Wylde Hide	Charlie Swan	10	10-00	11-01	Unseated rider
27th	Dextra Dove	Chris Maude	10	10-00	33/1	Pulled up
27th	Grange Brake	David Walsh	11	10-00 [10-04]	100/1	Refused
27th	Feathered Gale	Franny Woods	10	10-03	16/1	Pulled up
27th	Lo Stregone	Graham Bradley	11	10-04	14/1	Pulled up
29th	Bishops Hall	Mark Richards	11	10-01	50/1	Pulled up
29th	Go Ballistic	Mick Fitzgerald	8	10-00 [10-03]	7/1 F	Pulled up

Note: Weights in square-brackets indicate overweight.

== Media coverage ==
"And Lord Gyllene is sprinting away with the 1997 150th National, a fantastic performance of jumping this by Lord Gyllene, getting a tremendous reception from the crowd, a tremendous performance its Lord Gyllene, bearing the colours of Stanley Clarke to victory, Lord Gyllene is the winner of the 1997 National."

— Commentator Peter O'Sullevan describing the climax of the race

The BBC retained the rights to televise the Grand National live worldwide for the 38th consecutive year. The coverage was presented by Desmond Lynam, and broadcast to an estimated global audience of 400 million people.

At the time of the evacuation the broadcasting team were evacuated too, with the exception of commentator Jim McGrath who was located in the commentary position at the far extreme of the course. McGrath continued to cover the events of the evacuation until the end of the broadcast, which was at around the time the race would have started. The BBC covered the rescheduled race live on the Monday evening. The bomb scare overshadowed the final broadcast of lead commentator Peter O'Sullevan, who had called the Grand National for the BBC on radio and then television every year since 1946. O'Sullevan had announced his retirement earlier in the season. Along with O'Sullevan and McGrath, the commentary team was completed by John Hanmer.
