= Flakey Dove =

British racehorse

- Sire: Oats
- Grandsire: Northfields
- Dam: Shadey Dove
- Damsire: Deadly Nightshade
- Sex: Mare
- Foaled: 10 April 1986
- Country: United Kingdom
- Colour: Bay
- Breeder: J. T. Price
- Owner: J. T. Price
- Trainer: Richard Price
- Record: 44:14-10-6
- Earnings: £247,879

Major wins
- Regency Hurdle (1993); Staffordshire Hurdle (1993); Champion Hurdle Trial (1994); Cleeve Hurdle (1994); Berkshire Hurdle (1994); Champion Hurdle (1994)

Flakey Dove (10 April 1986 – 13 February 2016) was a British racehorse best known for her win in the 1994 Champion Hurdle. In a career which lasted from January 1990 until January 1995 she ran forty-four times and won fourteen races. Although she won two races on the flat, Flakey Dove was a specialist hurdler who competed mainly in National Hunt races. She ran in some races restricted to mares in the early part of her racing career, but was mainly campaigned against geldings and entire horses in open competition.

In 1994, her best year, she became the third mare to win the Champion Hurdle at Cheltenham Racecourse. Her other important wins included the Cleeve Hurdle and the Champion Hurdle Trial. The Racing Post rated her one of the ten best jumping mares of the 20th century.

Unlike the majority of modern racehorses, Flakey Dove was not a Thoroughbred.

== Background ==
Flakey Dove was a bay mare with a small white star, bred and owned by the Price family of Herefordshire. Shortly after the Second World War, Tom Price paid £25 for a broken down point-to-point mare of uncertain parentage named Cottage Lass. She became a successful broodmare, becoming the ancestor of three generations of racehorses, all of whom included the word "Dove" in their names. As Cottage Lass's pedigree could not be traced to any of the Foundation mares recorded in the General Stud Book, her descendant could not be registered as Thoroughbreds. Tom Price's grandson, Richard, who ran a 400 acre livestock farm near Leominster, trained Cottage Lass's great-granddaughter Flakey Dove throughout her racing career. Flakey Dove was sired by the Oats, a successful National Hunt stallion whose other progeny included the Cheltenham Gold Cup winner Master Oats.

== Racing career ==
=== 1990–1992: early career ===
Flakey Dove began her racing career in early 1990 by contesting three National Hunt flat races (also known as "bumpers"). She won on her debut at Ludlow Racecourse in February, running on gamely to win by a head and then finished second at Haydock Park and Hereford.

In the 1990/1991 season, Flakey Dove was campaigned in Novice hurdle races. She fell in her first hurdle race in February and was well beaten in her next two races before winning a Novice handicap race at Newbury Racecourse in March under a light weight (for jump racing) of 142 pounds. She was beaten when favourite in her next race at Exeter Racecourse and ended the season with a rating of 102, suggesting that she was well below top class.

As in her first two seasons, Flakey Dove did not run until February of the 1991/1992 season, but she then ran eight times in less than three months. Racing in handicaps, she won four times and finished second twice as her official rating rose to 140. On her last appearance of the National Hunt season, she started favourite for the Grade III Swinton Handicap Hurdle at Haydock Park in May and finished third to Bitofabanter. Later in the month she made her first appearance in a flat race and finished unplaced in a Listed race at Newbury.

=== 1992/1993 season: hurdle racing ===
Flakey Dove's next season began in February when she finished second in a race at Stratford and then ran fifth in the Tote Gold Trophy at Newbury. In the same month she recorded her first success at Graded level when beating Lift and Load by five lengths in the Grade II Regency Hurdle at Warwick, but the form was reversed ten days later when Lift and Load beat the mare in the Grade II Berkshire Hurdle at Newbury.

In March, Flakey Dove appeared for the first time at the Cheltenham Festival. She started a 50/1 outsider for the Champion Hurdle and finished seventh of the eighteen runners behind Granville Again. She then finished second in a handicap hurdle at Ascot and fourth in a flat race at Nottingham. On 1 May, Flakey Dove recorded her best win up to that time when she defeated the former Champion Hurdler Beech Road in the Staffordshire Hurdle at Uttoxeter Racecourse. Two days later she finished unplaced in the Swinton Hurdle before ending the season by finishing eighth in a flat race at Bath.

=== 1993/1994 season: hurdle racing ===
Flakey Dove ran thirteen times in her championship season: according to Price the mare thrived on a busy racing schedule. She began by recording her first win in a flat race when she won a maiden event at Nottingham. She was beaten in her next four races over hurdles but never finished worse than fourth. In January 1994, Flakey Dove entered contention for the Champion Hurdle with a win in the Champion Hurdle Trial at Haydock Park. Ridden for the first time by Richard Dunwoody, she took the lead two hurdles from the finish and drew clear to win by twenty lengths from the Irish-trained favourite Tiananmen Square. Dunwoody was in the saddle again a week later when Flakey Dove ran in the Grade I Cleeve Hurdle at Cheltenham. She confirmed her improvement by overtaking Sweet Duke at the last hurdle and winning by six lengths. She then started favourite for the Tote Gold Trophy but finished third behind Large Action and Oh So Risky. In this race she carried 154 pounds and was ridden by Norman Williamson. Dunwoody reclaimed the ride in the Berkshire Hurdle on 5 March and the mare won the Grade II event very easily by twenty lengths.

On 15 March, Flakey Dove, ridden by Mark Dwyer, contested the Champion Hurdle at Cheltenham. The mare started the 9/1 third favourite behind Oh So Risky (9/4) and Large Action (8/1). The field of fifteen runners also included the previous champions Granville Again and Morley Street. Dwyer restrained the mare in the early stages before moving up to join the leaders four hurdles from the finish. Approaching the final hurdle, Flakey Dove overtook the leader, Large Action, and ran on in the closing stages to win by one and a half lengths from Oh So Risky. She became the first mare to win the race since Dawn Run in 1984 and the first British-trained mare to win since African Sister in 1939. The mare's win was enthusiastically received by the Cheltenham crowd and Richard Price admitted that "I had a tear in my eye" as he led Flakey Dove into the winner's enclosure.

On her next appearance, Flakey Dove won a flat race at Haydock on 2 April before running in the Grade I Aintree Hurdle a week later. She was made favourite for the race but ran poorly and finished tailed off behind Danoli. On her final run of the season, Flakey Dove returned to the flat and finished unplaced in the Group Three Sagaro Stakes at Ascot.

=== 1994/1995 season: hurdle racing ===
Flakey Dove failed to win in her final season although she ran some good races in defeat. She finished third to Oh So Risky in the Ascot Hurdle in November and in the following month she ran second to Large Action in the Bula Hurdle, pleasing her connections with a "determined" effort. At Kempton Park in late December she started favourite for the Christmas Hurdle and finished a close fifth to Absalom's Lady. The mare's last two runs came in January 1995. She was runner-up to Relkeel in the Champion Hurdle Trial and fifth to Mudahim in the Cleeve Hurdle.

== Retirement ==
Flakey Dove retired to become a broodmare. She produced at least three minor winners: Minella Lodge, Just Smudge and Dovecote Lodge. Another of her foals, the unraced mare Bay Dove, was sired by Alderbrook and was therefore the offspring of two Champion Hurdle winners. She was retired from breeding in 2010 and was euthanised in February 2016 at the age of 30. Richard Price said "She took us all to the big places and always ran with credit wherever we took her... She couldn't go on any longer and was put to sleep. It's sad but we're left with great memories."

== Pedigree ==
Pedigree of Flakey Dove (GB), bay mare, 1986
Sire Oats (IRE) 1973	Northfields; 1968	Northern Dancer	Nearctic
Sire Oats (IRE) 1973	Northfields; 1968	Northern Dancer	Natalma
Sire Oats (IRE) 1973	Northfields; 1968	Little Hut	Occupy
Sire Oats (IRE) 1973	Northfields; 1968	Little Hut	Savage Beauty
Sire Oats (IRE) 1973	Arctic Lace; 1966	Arctic Chevalier	Arctic Star
Sire Oats (IRE) 1973	Arctic Lace; 1966	Arctic Chevalier	French Ballet
Sire Oats (IRE) 1973	Arctic Lace; 1966	Alace	Rapace
Sire Oats (IRE) 1973	Arctic Lace; 1966	Alace	Fair Alycia
Dam Shadey Dove (GB) 1974	Deadly Nightshade; 1966	Floribunda	Princely Gift
Dam Shadey Dove (GB) 1974	Deadly Nightshade; 1966	Floribunda	Astrentia
Dam Shadey Dove (GB) 1974	Deadly Nightshade; 1966	Maxims	Major Portion
Dam Shadey Dove (GB) 1974	Deadly Nightshade; 1966	Maxims	Bonneville
Dam Shadey Dove (GB) 1974	Red Dove; 1956	All Red	Winalot
Dam Shadey Dove (GB) 1974	Red Dove; 1956	All Red	Henna
Dam Shadey Dove (GB) 1974	Red Dove; 1956	Cottage Lass	Cottage
Dam Shadey Dove (GB) 1974	Red Dove; 1956	Cottage Lass	unknown
