= Algan (horse) =

French racehorse

- Sire: Le Pontet
- Grandsire: Succes
- Dam: Djaipour
- Damsire: Gaur
- Sex: Gelding
- Foaled: 1988
- Country: France
- Colour: Bay or Brown
- Breeder: Suc François Halgand & Claude Gouin
- Owner: Marquesa de Moratalla
- Trainer: François Doumen
- Record: 28: 7-2-3
- Earnings: £356,906

Major wins
- Prix Richard et Robert Hennesy (1994); Grand Prix d'Automne (1994); King George VI Chase (1994); Prix Robert de Clermont (1996); Prix Troytown (1999)

Algan (foaled 1988) was a French Selle Français racehorse who competed under National Hunt rules. As a six-year-old in the autumn of 1994 he won the Grand Prix d'Automne, one of the most important hurdle races in France and was then sent to England where he recorded an upset victory over a strong field in the King George VI Chase. He continued to race for several years without replicating his early success. After his retirement from professional racing he competed in Point-to-point races.

== Background ==
Algan was a "tall, elegant" dark bay or brown gelding bred in France by Succ. François Halgand & Claude Gouin. He was sired by the French Thoroughbred stallion Le Pontet whose other progeny included the Grand Steeple-Chase de Paris winner Le Pontif. His dam Djaipour was not a Thoroughbred, being descended from Rezeenne, a mare of unknown pedigree. During his racing career he was owned by the Marquesa de Moratalla and trained in France by François Doumen at Lamorlaye.

== Racing career ==
=== 1993/1994 season ===
In the 1993/1994 season Algan was ridden in by Adam Kondrat. He won a hurdle race at Auteuil Hippodrome on very soft ground on 9 October and finished eighth behind Al Capone II when joint-favourite for the Prix Georges Courtois in December.

=== 1994/1995 season ===
In September 1994, Algan won the Prix Richard et Robert Hennessy from his stable companion Val d'Alene who won the Racing Post Chase later that season. After finishing fifth to the Doumen-trained Bog Frog in the Prix Carmarthen, Algan recorded his most important victory up to that time when beating Druval by half a length in the Grand Prix d'Automne hurdle over 4100 metres on 1 November. When moved up in distance for the Prix Leon Olry-Roederer hurdle over 4800 metres three weeks later he finished third behind Druval and Royal Chance.

In December, Algan was sent to England to contest the 44th running of the King George VI Chase over three miles at Kempton Park Racecourse on Boxing Day. He started a 16/1 outsider and was regarded as the second string runner from the Doumen yard behind The Fellow who had won the race in 1991 and 1992. The nine-runner field also included the 1993 winner Barton Bank who started favourite, Bradbury Star (twice winner of the Mackeson Gold Cup), Monsieur Le Cure (Sun Alliance Chase), Travado (Arkle Challenge Trophy) and Young Hustler (Sun Alliance Chase). Ridden by Philippe Chevalier, Algan was restrained at the back of the field in the early stages before making progress approaching the third last fence where The Fellow, who had been struggling for some time, was pulled up by Adam Kondrat. Barton Bank who had made most of the running, went well clear of the field at the second last as Algan continued his progress, moving into second approaching the final fence. At the last obstacle, Barton Bank, ten lengths clear of his opponents blundered badly, unseating his jockey Adrian Maguire leaving Algan to win the race by two and a half lengths and a head from Monieur Le Cure and the Irish-trained outsider Second Schedual.

In February, Algan returned to Britain for the Racing Post Chase and finished last of the five finishers behind Val d'Alene under top weight of 164 pounds. In March he contested the Britain's most prestigious steeplechase, the Gold Cup at the Cheltenham Festival. He unseated Chevalier when making a bad mistake at the thirteenth fence in a race won by Master Oats.

== Later career ==
In the 1995/1996 season, Algan finished third to Al Capone II in the Prix La Haye Jousselin in November and won the Prix Robert de Clermont in February. He again contested the King George VI, run that year at Sandown Park Racecourse in January but finished sixth, beaten fifty lengths by the winner One Man. Before the race, Doumen pointed out that the seven-hour journey by road and ferry caused many problems including "dehydration, weight loss, and tiredness". He failed to win in the next two seasons, although he did finish fourth in both the 1996 Prix La Haye Jousselin and the 1997 Grand Prix d'Automne. In March 1999 he recorded his first big win for more than three years when he defeated Vieux Beaufai by a neck in the Prix Troytown, a steeplechase over 4400 metres. In the 1999/2000 season he won a hurdle race in October, finished second to Vieux Beaufai in the Prix Georges Courtois and ran third to the same horse in the Prix Troytown.

In December 2003 Algan, then aged fifteen, was bought by James Ryan and then competed on the amateur Point-to-point circuit. In February 2004 Ryan said that he had been told by Doumen that Algan was still "young at heart" and "doesn't act his age".

== Pedigree ==
Pedigree of Algan (FR), bay gelding, 1988
Sire Le Pontet (FR) 1965	Succes (FR); 1957	Antler	Hyder Ali
Sire Le Pontet (FR) 1965	Succes (FR); 1957	Antler	Tomorrow
Sire Le Pontet (FR) 1965	Succes (FR); 1957	Ceres	Nosca
Sire Le Pontet (FR) 1965	Succes (FR); 1957	Ceres	Cenelle
Sire Le Pontet (FR) 1965	Arielle (FR); 1957	Tosco	Tornado
Sire Le Pontet (FR) 1965	Arielle (FR); 1957	Tosco	Statira
Sire Le Pontet (FR) 1965	Arielle (FR); 1957	Idee	Biribi
Sire Le Pontet (FR) 1965	Arielle (FR); 1957	Idee	Tapioca
Dam Djairpour (FR) 1969	Gaur (FR); 1955	Rockefella	Hyperion
Dam Djairpour (FR) 1969	Gaur (FR); 1955	Rockefella	Rockfel
Dam Djairpour (FR) 1969	Gaur (FR); 1955	Cybele	Chateau Bouscaut
Dam Djairpour (FR) 1969	Gaur (FR); 1955	Cybele	Coquetterie
Dam Djairpour (FR) 1969	Marina (FR); 1956	Sans Ticket	Quai d'Orsay
Dam Djairpour (FR) 1969	Marina (FR); 1956	Sans Ticket	La Dore
Dam Djairpour (FR) 1969	Marina (FR); 1956	Verveine	Leonidas
Dam Djairpour (FR) 1969	Marina (FR); 1956	Verveine	Razeenne (Non-Thoroughbred)
