= Summer Cup (Uttoxeter) =

Steeplechase horse race in Britain

Summer Cup
2026
Imperial Alex	Ki Woo	Riskintheground

Previous years
2025
Only The Bold	Digby	Light N Strike
2024
Hang In There	Percussion	Monte Igueldo
2023
Twig	Ruthless Article	Kinondo Kwetu
2022
Jerrysback	Ruthless Article	Francky Du Berlais
2021
Storm Home	Little Bruce	Mellow Ben

2020-2011
2020
Minellacelebration	Bandsman	The Young Master
2019
Brave Eagle	Killaro Boy	Winter Lion
2018
Virgilio	Henllan Harri	Relentless Dreamer
2017
Tempestatefloresco	Shelford	In The Rough
2016
Drop Out Joe	Ballynagour	Pacha Du Polder
2015
Shuil Royale	Silver Man	Adrenalin Flight
2014
The Romford Pele	Carlito Brigante	Bear's Affair
2013
Storm Survivor	Pure Faith	Lost Glory
2012
Emmaslegend	Ballyvesey	Mumbles Head
2011
Knighton Combe	Ballyvesey	Surenaga

2010-2000
2010
Ouzbeck	Brooklyn Brownie	Valley Ride
2009
Fire And Rain	The King of Angels	Keenan's Future
2008
Surface To Air	Out The Black	Rakalackey
2007
Kock De La Vesvre	Dead-Eyed Dick	Hautclan
2006
Mckelvey	Omni Cosmo Touch	Dead-Eyed Dick
2005
Rheindross	Caught At Dawn	Gumley Gale
2004
Take The Stand	Exstoto	Bright Approach
2003
Jurancon	Spot Thedifference	Take Control
2002
Stormez	General Claremont	Ardent Scout
2001
Stewarts Pride	General Claremont	Derring Bridge
2000
Berlin Blue	Derring Bridge	The Gopher

The Summer Cup is a National Hunt handicap steeplechase in England which is open to horses aged five years or older. It is run at Uttoxeter over a distance of 3 miles, 2 furlongs and 13 yards (3319 metres) and is scheduled to take place each year in late June or early July.

The race was first run in 2000 as the Summer National over a distance of about 4 miles. The distance was reduced to three and a half miles in 2009. The race was rebranded as the Summer Cup and reduced further to its current distance in 2012. Prior to 2023 it carried Listed status.

== Records ==
Leading jockey (4 wins):

- Noel Fehily – Rheindross (2005), Surface To Air (2008), Fire And Rain (2009), Shuil Royale (2015)

Leading trainer (2 wins):

- Martin Pipe– Stormez (2002), Jurancon II (2003)
- Peter Bowen - Take The Stand (2004), McKelvey (2006)
- Emma Lavelle - Fire And Rain (2009), Ouzbeck (2010)
- Colin Tizzard - Tempestatefloresco (2017), Storm Home (2021)

== Winners ==
Year	Winner	Age	Weight	Jockey	Trainer
2000	Berlin Blue	7	10-05	Sam Stronge	Robert Stronge
2001	Stewarts Pride (Note: The race took place at Stratford in 2001)	8	10-00	Billy Worthington	Barry Leavy
2002	Stormez	5	11-08	Tony McCoy	Martin Pipe
2003	Jurancon II	6	10-10	Rodi Greene	Martin Pipe
2004	Take The Stand	8	11-12	Seamus Durack	Peter Bowen
2005	Rheindross	10	10-03	Noel Fehily	Charlie Mann
2006	McKelvey	7	10-10	Tony McCoy	Peter Bowen
2007	Kock De La Vesvre	9	10-09	Sam Thomas	Venetia Williams
2008	Surface To Air	7	11-05	Noel Fehily	Chris Bealby
2009	Fire And Rain	6	11-03	Noel Fehily	Emma Lavelle
2010	Ouzbeck	8	11-06	Jack Doyle	Emma Lavelle
2011	Knighton Combe	11	10-06	Daryl Jacob	Jamie Snowden
2012	Emmaslegend	7	11-02	Gavin Sheehan	Suzy Smith
2013	Storm Survivor	7	10-01	Richie McLernon	Jonjo O'Neill
2014	The Romford Pele	7	11-05	Paul Carberry	Rebecca Curtis
2015	Shuil Royale	10	10-05	Noel Fehily	Harry Fry
2016	Drop Out Joe	8	10-06	Graham Watters	Charlie Longsdon
2017	Tempestatefloresco	9	11-02	Harry Cobden	Colin Tizzard
2018	Virgilio	9	11-12	Harry Skelton	Dan Skelton
2019	Brave Eagle	7	11-12	Nico de Boinville	Nicky Henderson
2020	Minellacelebration	10	11-07	Ben Poste	Katy Price
2021	Storm Home	9	10-00	Brendan Powell	Colin Tizzard
2022	Jerrysback	10	10-12	Richie McLernon	Ben Haslam
2023	Twig	8	10-11	Beau Morgan	Ben Pauling
2024	Hang In There	10	11-11	Joe Anderson	Emma Lavelle
2025	Only The Bold	10	10-02	Gavin Sheehan	Jamie Snowden
2026	Imperial Alex	9	10-04	Stan Sheppard	Tom Lacey

== See also ==
- Horse racing in Great Britain
- List of British National Hunt races
