= Uttoxeter Racecourse =

Horse racing venue in Uttoxeter, England

Coordinates: 52°53′35″N 1°50′59″W

Uttoxeter
- The stands
- Interactive map of Uttoxeter
- Location: Uttoxeter, Staffordshire
- Owned by: Arena Racing Company
- Screened on: Sky Sports Racing
- Course type: National Hunt
- Notable races: Midlands Grand National; Summer Cup

Uttoxeter Racecourse is a National Hunt racecourse in Uttoxeter, Staffordshire, England.

The parade ring

== Course ==
Uttoxeter is a left-handed oval shaped course of 1 mile 2½ furlongs in circumference.

The back ‘straight’ has a dog-leg to the right and is undulating as it rises over Clump Hill. The course continues with a downhill run around the far bend into the home straight.

The home straight of four furlongs is flat and galloping ensuring fair and competitive finishes to most races including the signature staying chases. The nature of the track often enables front-running tactics to pay off.

== History ==
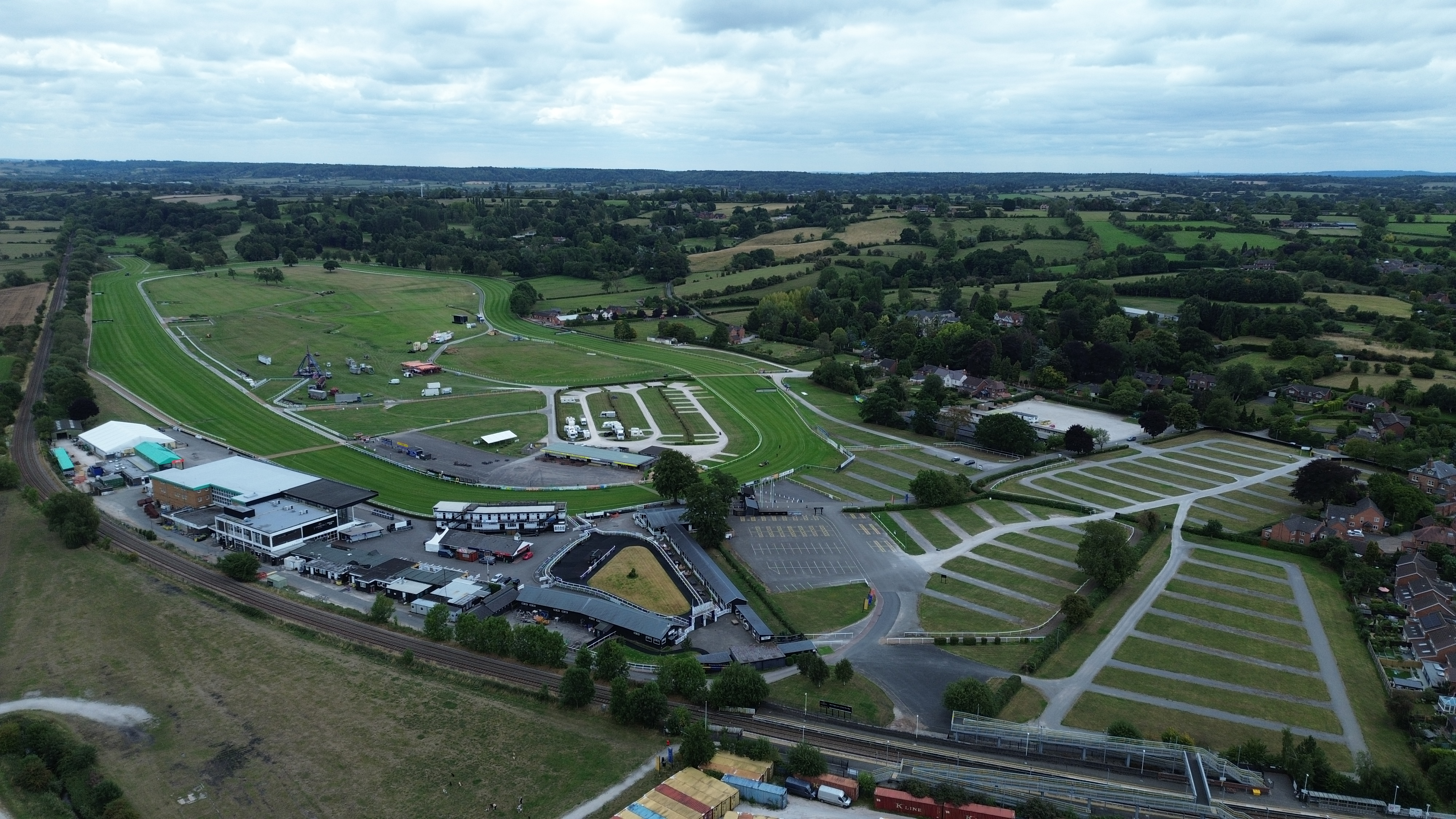
The racecourse from the air

The racecourse was built in 1907 and opened by a company formed to take over the interests and licence of Keele Park racecourse, which had recently ceased to operate. There were five days of racing in 1907: two in May, two in October and one in December. According to 'The Racecourse of Great Britain and Ireland' guide "the meeting is largely patronised by the nobility and gentry and sportsmen in the county there being 100 members already subscribed to the Club". Horse racing was suspended throughout the country in 1914 during the First World War.

Racing resumed in 1921, although the first meeting had to be abandoned on account of bad weather. Four meetings a year were held, in April, May, September and October, and although the course never broke records, there were always good fields, big crowds, and a small but steady profit for the Racecourse Company. During the Second World War, the course was requisitioned by the War Department and no racing took place.

In 1949, the Uttoxeter Urban Council appointed a committee to investigate the non-resumption of racing after the war. Part of the course consisted of a four-acre field which the Racecourse Company did not own, but only leased from a farmer, who was reluctant to lease or sell it to them at a sum which they could afford. It appeared the company would have to go into liquidation and the racecourse would disappear. After much debate, the racecourse re-opened on 12 April 1952. With a crowd of 12,000, the meeting was successful enough for the organisers to be almost overwhelmed. The Uttoxeter Urban Council had come to the rescue of the course and their decision to buy it was upheld by the community.

Popular, but without the funds to modernise and rebuild as the Executive would have wished, in 1966 the course took its place in the modernisation lists of the Horserace Betting Levy Board. A scheme was drawn up and approved whereby £167,000 would be spent in giving the course its long overdue facelift. Olive Davis, a local bookmaker and chairman of Uttoxeter Council, along with John Kenny MBE (clerk to the course at both Uttoxeter and Stratford) instigated the facelift and pursued the levy board for the funds. Olive became Chairman of Uttoxeter Racecourse, and was known as the Mrs Topham of Uttoxeter, after the only other female racecourse chairman in England at the time (Mrs Topham of Aintree). Olive Davis then continued to promote the race course on non-race days in the newly built Paddock Suite, which became the main venue in Uttoxeter for weddings, balls, disco parties, and private functions. This laid the foundations for today's popularity for the racecourse as a place to hold an event. Mrs Olive Davis was also known for her support and pioneering activities in the crusade to get ladies accepted as jockeys. Her husband Raymond Davis was a well known National Hunt jockey and her father was Arthur Birch, a renowned trainer. Olive died in 1999, but her dedication to Uttoxeter Racecourse is the cornerstone of its success today.

Champion jockey Josh Gifford equalled Fred Winter's record of 121 winners in a season at Uttoxeter on 15 June 1967, at the very last meeting of the 1966–67 National Hunt season. The horse was five-year-old Jolly Signal trained by Earl Jones at Hednesford. Half an hour later Gifford broke the record when he rode Red Flush to a 10-length victory in the Ashbourne Handicap Chase.

In 1976, Rag Trade, owned by the flamboyant hairdresser Raymond 'Teasy Weasy' Bessone, won the Marston's Pedigree Midlands Grand National and followed-up by winning the Grand National at Aintree a few weeks later. Uttoxeter was again the decisive venue in 1982 when John Francome, on John Edward's Buckmaster, gained his 800th overall winner and his 120th for the season to share the jump jockeys' title with the sidelined Peter Scudamore.

In 1988, Sir Stanley Clarke CBE acquired Uttoxeter from East Staffordshire district council. Forming holding company Northern Racing, Clarke made a significant personal investment in facilities, including the creation of two new grandstands and a new paddock development.

In 1997, The Midlands National produced its most famous horse in Lord Gyllene, owned by Uttoxeter's chairman Sir Stanley Clarke. Lord Gyllene finished second to Seven Towers in the race but four weeks later recorded an historic victory in the Grand National at Aintree. His winning margin of 25 lengths was the most impressive in 20 years and he also recorded one of the fastest times in the race's history.

In 2002, history was made once again when champion jockey AP McCoy became the winning-most National Hunt jockey of all time with his victory aboard Mighty Montefalco, marking his 1700th win.

In 2006, a fire broke out in a betting van beside the grandstand, which as a result had to be evacuated. Horses were in the paddock for the first race but returned to the stables. No-one was injured but racing was suspended for one hour and forty minutes. The final race began at 18:53.

== Notable races ==
Month	DOW	Race Name	Type	Grade	Distance	Age/Sex
May	Saturday	Staffordshire Plate	Chase	Handicap	3m	5yo+
May	Saturday	Clarke Chase	Chase	Handicap	2m 4f	5yo+
June/July	Sunday	Summer Cup	Chase	Handicap	3m	5yo+
March	Saturday	JenningsBet Handicap Hurdle	Hurdle	Handicap	2m 7½f	4yo+
March	Saturday	Midlands Grand National	Chase	Premier Handicap	4m 2f	5yo+
