= Granville Again =

Irish racehorse

- Sire: Deep Run
- Grandsire: Pampered King
- Dam: High Board
- Damsire: High Line
- Sex: Gelding
- Foaled: 20 June 1986
- Country: Ireland
- Colour: Chestnut
- Breeder: Marshall Parkhill
- Owner: Godfrey Deacon; Eric Scarth
- Trainer: Henry Cleary; Martin Pipe; Len Lungo; Muriel Naughton
- Record: 30:12-6-1
- Earnings: £208,474

Major wins
- Dovecote Novices' Hurdle (1991); Top Novices' Hurdle (1991); Champion Hurdle Trial (1992); Scottish Champion Hurdle (1992); Champion Hurdle (1993)

Granville Again (20 June 1986 – August 2003) was an Irish-bred racehorse who competed in National Hunt races and recorded his most important win in the 1993 Champion Hurdle. In his early career he won two of his three National Hunt Flat races and was a successful Novice Hurdler, winning the Dovecote Novices' Hurdle and Top Novices' Hurdle as well as finishing second in the Supreme Novices' Hurdle. In the 1991/1992 season, Granville Again won all five of his completed races including the Champion Hurdle Trial and the Scottish Champion Hurdle but fell when second favourite for the Champion Hurdle. In the following season he was beaten in his first three starts but returned to his best form to defeat a strong field in the Champion Hurdle. He never won again and failed to finish in the first three in his last ten races. He was retired from racing in 1996 and died in 2003 at the age of seventeen.

== Background ==
Granville Again was a chestnut horse with a narrow white blaze, bred in Ireland by Marshall Parkhill. He was sired by Deep Run, an outstanding sire of jumpers whose other progeny included Dawn Run and Golden Cygnet. Granville Again's dam, High Board was not a Thoroughbred, being a descendant of the mare Arab Maid, whose pedigree on her mother's side was uncertain. Arab Maid's other descendants included the dual Cheltenham Gold Cup winner Easter Hero. Two years before Granville Again was foaled, High Board had produced his full brother Morley Street, who won the Champion Hurdle in 1991.

During the early part of his racing career, the gelding was owned by Godfrey Deacon and trained in County Wexford by Henry Cleary.

== Racing career ==
=== 1989/1990 National Hunt season: National Hunt Flat races ===
Granville Again began his racing career as a four-year-old in early 1990 by competing in National Hunt Flat races (also known as "bumpers"). He made his debut at Leopardstown Racecourse on 19 March when he started at odds of 4/1 and won by six lengths from eight opponents. He followed up at Navan Racecourse on 1 May, starting favourite and winning by eight lengths. Ten days later at Phoenix Park he ended his first season by finishing second to the Dermot Weld-trained favourite General Idea.

=== 1990/1991 National Hunt season: Novice Hurdles ===
Before the start of the 1990/1991 National Hunt season, Granvile Again was sold to Eric Scarth and sent to be trained in England by Martin Pipe. He competed in Novice Hurdle races, making his debut over obstacles at Chepstow Racecourse on 22 December where he finished second to the five-year-old Upton Park. On 7 January at Wolverhampton Racecourse he recorded his first success over hurdles, winning by twelve lengths in a "canter" at odds of 1/3. He followed up three weeks later at Leicester, starting the 2/9 favourite and winning by eight lengths. The gelding was then moved up in class to contest the Grade II Dovecote Novices' Hurdle at Kempton Park on 23 February and started 11/4 second favourite behind Gaasid, a former flat racer who had won the Kennel Gate Novices' Hurdle at Ascot in November. Ridden by Peter Scudamore, Granville Again overtook Gaasid at the penultimate hurdle and drew away to win by fifteen lengths.

In March 1991, Granville Again made his first appearance at the Cheltenham Festival and started the 2/1 favourite in a field of twenty-one for the Supreme Novices' Hurdle. He was hampered twice during the race, and although he finished strongly, he was unable to catch the Irish-trained Destriero and finished second, beaten four lengths by the winner and three quarters of a length ahead of Gran Alba. On 5 April, Granville Again started the 5/4 favourite for the Grade II Top Novices' Hurdle at the Grand National meeting at Aintree Racecourse. He was restrained by Scudamore in the early stages before moving into contention at half way. He took the lead jumping the final hurdle and won by one and a half lengths from Gran Alba with Young Pokey (later to win the Arkle Challenge Trophy) in third place.

=== 1991/1992 National Hunt season ===
In the first half of the 1991/1992 season Granville Again contested three legs of the Sport of Kings Challenge, a series of races intended to promote international competition in jump racing. In November he traveled to Ireland and defeated the Paddy Mullins-trained mare Minorettes Girl by twelve lengths at odds of 4/5 before returning to England for the next two races of the series. At Cheltenham on 7 December he beat the Challow Novices' Hurdle winner Tyrone Bridge (also trained by Martin Pipe) by three quarters of a length with the Sun Alliance Novices' Hurdle winner Crystal Spirit twenty lengths back in third. At Chepstow two weeks later he won the final leg of the challenge by beating Tyrone Bridge again, this time by two lengths.

In January, Granville Again was matched against more experienced opponents in the Champion Hurdle Trial at Haydock Park Racecourse. Starting the 1/2 favourite he was restrained by Scudamore in the early stages before overtaking the mare Winnie the Witch on the run-in and won by two lengths. On 10 March 1992, Granville Again started 9/2 second favourite behind his brother Morley Street in the Champion Hurdle at Cheltenham. After being held up towards the rear of the field he made progress towards the lead before falling at the second last hurdle when looking the likely winner. A month after his fall at Cheltenham, Granville Again started 4/7 favourite for the Scottish Champion Hurdle at Ayr Racecourse. Taking the lead at the penultimate hurdle, he accelerated clear in the closing stages to win in "impressive" style from Jinxy Jack and Fidway.

=== 1992/1993 National Hunt season ===
On 15 November 1992 at Cheltenham, Granville Again and Morley Street met for the second time in the Elite Hurdle in which the other two runners were Tyrone Bridge and the Triumph Hurdle winner Oh So Risky. Granville Again took the lead approaching the final hurdle but was overtaken by his brother on the run in and beaten a length. The Bula Hurdle at the same course attracted an exceptionally strong field for a Grade II race and Granville Again finished second to Halkopous, ahead of Morley Street, Oh So Risky and Kribensis. Granville Again started the 11/10 favourite for the Grade I Christmas Hurdle at Kempton on 26 December. He appeared to have every chance at the second last hurdle, but failed to quicken in the closing stages and finished third to Mighty Mogul and Flown. The other runners included Oh So Risky, Kribensis and Gran Alba in fifth, sixth and seventh places. Following the advice of Michael W. Dickinson, Martin Pipe decided to give the gelding a long break before the Cheltenham Festival.

On 16 March 1993, Granville Again started the 13/2 second favourite for the 64th running of the Champion Hurdle. His opponents included Flown (the 7/2 favourite), Halkopous, Oh So Risky, Morley Street, Jinxy Jack, Vintage Crop, Flakey Dove, Duke of Monmouth (Triumph Hurdle) and Coulton (Mersey Novices' Hurdle). Scudamore settled Granville Again in the middle of the field before beginning to make progress at the third last. He took the lead approaching the final hurdle and was driven out in the closing stages to win by a length from the 50/1 outsider Royal Derbi with Halkopous two and a half lengths away in third. After the race, Pipe said "This horse has plenty of ability but was just a bit off colour earlier in the season. But he battled well today and proved everybody wrong". Scudamore, who had considered switching to ride the stable's other runner Valfinet until Granville Again "sparkled" in a training gallop said "He was going so well that I wondered if anything was there, then I tapped him to make sure and he was immediately on the bridle. Everything kept opening up for me as I was coming down the hill, the way it always seems to when you're going well".

At Aintree in April Granville Again was moved up in distance for the Grade Aintree Hurdle over two and a half miles. He started the 10/11 favourite but was beaten one and a half lengths by Morley Street, with Flown two lengths away in third.

=== Later career ===
Granville Again remained in training for another four seasons, but never recovered his best form. In the 1993/1994 season he finished fourth in the Ascot Hurdle before falling in the Bula Hurdle. He finished fourth in the Irish Champion Hurdle and seventh behind Flakey Dove in the 1994 Champion Hurdle before running fifth in the Scottish Champion Hurdle for which he was trained by Len Lungo. In the following season he was trained by Muriel Naughton in Yorkshire and made only two appearances, finishing seventh in the Ascot Hurdle and twelfth behind Alderbrook in the 1995 Champion Hurdle. In early 1996 he was tried over fences and was pulled up in a novice steeplechase at Kempton and was then pulled up again in a handicap hurdle at Aintree. He made his final appearance in the Fighting Fifth Hurdle at Newcastle Racecourse on 30 November 1996 when he started a 100/1 outsider and was pulled up four hurdles from the finish. A veterinary inspection found that he was suffering from an irregular heartbeat.

=== Retirement ===
Granville Again was retired from racing after his run at Newcastle in 1996 and spent the remainder of his life at Eric Scarth's property in Northumberland. He died in 2003 at the age of seventeen. Martin Pipe said "Granville was an absolute star... he will be sorely missed and we shall all remember our friend with great affection".

== Pedigree ==
Pedigree of Granville Again (GB), 1986
Sire Deep Run (GB) 1966	Pampered King; 1954	Prince Chevalier	Prince Rose
Sire Deep Run (GB) 1966	Pampered King; 1954	Prince Chevalier	Chevalerie
Sire Deep Run (GB) 1966	Pampered King; 1954	Netherton Maid	Nearco
Sire Deep Run (GB) 1966	Pampered King; 1954	Netherton Maid	Phase
Sire Deep Run (GB) 1966	Trial By Fire; 1958	Court Martial	Fair Trial
Sire Deep Run (GB) 1966	Trial By Fire; 1958	Court Martial	Instantaneous
Sire Deep Run (GB) 1966	Trial By Fire; 1958	Mitrailleuse	Mieuxce
Sire Deep Run (GB) 1966	Trial By Fire; 1958	Mitrailleuse	French Kin
Dam High Board (GB) 1977	High Line; 1966	High Hat	Hyperion
Dam High Board (GB) 1977	High Line; 1966	High Hat	Madonna
Dam High Board (GB) 1977	High Line; 1966	Time Call	Chanteur
Dam High Board (GB) 1977	High Line; 1966	Time Call	Aleria
Dam High Board (GB) 1977	Matchboard; 1963	Straight Deal	Solario
Dam High Board (GB) 1977	Matchboard; 1963	Straight Deal	Good Deal
Dam High Board (GB) 1977	Matchboard; 1963	Royal Alliance	King Hal
Dam High Board (GB) 1977	Matchboard; 1963	Royal Alliance	Queens Arms (Arab Maid family)
