= Miinnehoma =

Irish-bred Thoroughbred racehorse

- Sire: Kambalda
- Grandsire: Right Royal
- Dam: Mrs Cairns
- Damsire: Choral Society
- Sex: Gelding
- Foaled: 1983
- Country: Ireland
- Colour: Bay or Brown
- Breeder: Patrick Day
- Owner: Freddie Starr
- Trainer: Owen Brennan; Martin Pipe
- Record: 25: 11-3-3
- Earnings: £ 246,579

Major wins
- Sun Alliance Novices' Chase (1992); Grand National (1994); Newton Chase (1995)

Miinnehoma (1983 – July 2012) was an Irish bred and British trained Thoroughbred racehorse most famous for his victory in the 1994 Grand National at Aintree, ridden by Richard Dunwoody, trained by Martin Pipe and owned by Freddie Starr.

Miinnehoma also won the 1992 Sun Alliance Chase and finished third to Master Oats in the 1995 Cheltenham Gold Cup at the age of twelve. In the 1995 Grand National he was tailed off from a long way out before being pulled up before the 21st fence on the second circuit.

After retirement he spent the rest of his days at the stables of Martin Pipe until his death at the age of 29 in July 2012.

== Grand National record ==
Grand National	Position	Jockey	Age	Weight	SP	Distance
1994	1st	Richard Dunwoody	11	10-8	16/1	Won by 1¼ lengths
1995	DNF	Richard Dunwoody	12	11-4	11/1	Tailed off, pulled up at fence 21
