= Barton Bank =

British racehorse

- Sire: Kambalda
- Dam: Lucifer's Daughter
- Damsire: Lucifer
- Sex: Gelding
- Foaled: 1986
- Country: Great Britain
- Colour: Bay
- Breeder: Miss P Hutton
- Owner: Mrs J Mould
- Trainer: David Nicholson
- Record: 38: 11-8-2
- Earnings: £332,055

Major wins
- Sefton Novices' Hurdle (1992); Worcester Novices' Chase (1992); Charlie Hall Chase (1993, 1995); Martell Cup Chase (1997); King George VI Chase (1993)
- Last updated on December 5, 2008

Barton Bank (1986-2007) was one of the top National Hunt chasers of the mid 1990s. He won the 1993 King George VI Chase as well as two Charlie Hall Chases at Wetherby (1993 and 1995).

== Background ==
He was trained by David Nicholson and in his major successes was ridden by Adrian Maguire or David Walsh. He was owned by Jenny Mould, whose green colours with white stars have been worn by horses such as Bindaree and Tipping Tim. She also part-owned Charter Party, who ran under different colours.

== Racing career ==
Barton Bank entered the 1993 Sun Alliance Chase as the favourite after betting support on the day. However, he broke a blood vessel and was pulled up. The winner was ante-post favourite Young Hustler.

The next season, Barton Bank won a battle with Bradbury Star for the King George crown. Back in third was The Fellow, who had won the last two renewals of the race. Fourth and fifth were Young Hustler and Zeta's Lad. All five horses jumped the second last together. Barton Bank was one of the favourites for the Cheltenham Gold Cup of 1994 but suffered an injury in the build-up and missed the race.

He went to the 1994 King George VI Chase well supported and approached the last fence 15 lengths clear. However, he met the fence wrong and gave Adrian Maguire no chance of staying on him (photo of Maguire falling off him) Outsider Algan took the prize. Barton Bank's trainer David Nicholson got into trouble for hitting a photographer who was taking his picture after this had happened. Barton Bank went to run in the Pillar Chase, where he was well beaten by Master Oats. He then ran in the Cheltenham Gold Cup. He was still running strongly when he hardly rose at a fence late in the course and crashed to the ground. The race was won by Master Oats. This was Barton Bank's third fall in four races. Peter Scudamore said about his King George fall, 'He just does not shorten'. He then went on to the Martell Cup Chase where he was last of six runners.

The following season, Barton Bank ran in the King George VI Chase (run that year at Sandown), where he was pulled up. He went on to another attempt at the Cheltenham Gold Cup. John McCririck stated on Channel 4's Morning Line programme that at 16/1 he was good value. Fellow pundit Ted Walsh jokingly asked whether they were omitting the open ditches on the course as these were the sort of fences the horse had problems with. In the end, Barton Bank was fourth but never looked like winning. He then came second in the Martell Cup Chase.

Barton Bank ran in the 1996 King George VI Chase. He was placed, but due to the rare fast ground at that time of year (which some considered to be dangerously frosty) only five horses turned up. One Man retained his crown. Barton Bank then came close to defeating One Man in the Pillar Chase where the latter's stamina worries came to the fore. He wasn't really considered for the Cheltenham Gold Cup, although the Racing Post newspaper felt his early morning price of 66/1 was some value. This was his best effort in the race as he stayed on well to finish second behind Mr Mulligan. He then won the Martell Cup Chase at Aintree. His season ended in the Whitbread Gold Cup, where he unseated his jockey at the water jump.

In the autumn of 1997, in the Hennessy Gold Cup he was second to Suny Bay (Peter O'Sullevan's last commentary). He returned for another crack at the King George VI Chase, Pillar Chase, and Cheltenham Gold Cup. However, he was well beaten in all three and was retired from racing.
