= Jodami =

Irish-bred Thoroughbred racehorse

- Racing silks of John Yeadon
- Sire: Crash Course
- Grandsire: Busted
- Dam: Masterstown Lucy
- Damsire: Bargello
- Sex: Gelding
- Foaled: 1985
- Country: Ireland
- Colour: Bay
- Breeder: Eamon Phelan
- Owner: John Yeadon
- Trainer: Peter Beaumont
- Record: 39: 18-12-3
- Earnings: £478,360

Major wins
- West of Scotland Novices' Chase (1992); Peter Marsh Chase (1993, 1997); Irish Gold Cup (1993, 1994, 1995); Cheltenham Gold Cup (1993); Edward Hanmer Memorial Chase (1993)

Jodami (6 April 1985 – 1 December 2008) was an Irish-bred, British-trained Thoroughbred racehorse. A specialist steeplechaser, he ran thirty-nine time and won eighteen races in a career which lasted from March 1990 until February 1997. After winning five races over hurdles, Jodami switched to racing over fences in the autumn of 1991. In early 1993 he won four consecutive races, culminating with a win in Britain's most prestigious steeplechase, the Cheltenham Gold Cup. He also won three editions of the Hennessy Gold Cup at Leopardstown Racecourse. Jodami's racing career was ended by injury in 1997. He died in 2008.

== Background ==
Jodami was a bay horse bred at Ballinabanogue, County Waterford by Eamon Phelan. During his racing career, he stood just under 17 hands high and weighed 570 kg. Timeform described him as being "deep-girthed" and an "old-fashioned" type of chaser while according to Richard Edmondson of The Independent Jodami was "a brute of a horse, a huge and stocky animal". He was sired by Crash Course who won the Doncaster Cup and became a successful National Hunt stallion: his other progeny included Rough Quest, Esha Ness and Maid of Money (Irish Grand National).

Eamon Phelan sold Jodami as a foal, but bought him back three years later and returned him to Ballinanaogue for another year before sending him to the Tattersalls sales where the horse was sold for IR£12,500. He was later purchased privately by the Yorkshire based trainer Peter Beaumont on behalf of John Yeadon. The exact price was not made public, but according to Beaumont, "he wasn't dear (expensive) at all". Beaumont trained the horse at his Foulrice Farm stable at Brandsby near York. Beaumont had originally established himself as a trainer on the amateur point-to-point circuit and at the time of Jodami's greatest success his stable housed approximately twenty horses. Yeadon named the horse after himself and his two sons: the names of John, David and Michael combining to make "Jodami".

== Racing career ==
=== 1990–1992: early career ===
Jodami began his racing career as a 5 year old by running in National Hunt flat races or "bumpers"; race designed for National Hunt-bred horses who lack the maturity to compete over obstacles. He won on his debut at Kelso as a 33/1 outsider before finishing fifth at Aintree and second at Ayr. In all three of his bumpers, he was ridden by Peter Beaumont's daughter, Anthea Farrell. The Aintree race was the last time that Jodami would finish a race in lower than third place for five years. After his run at Ayr, Jodami did not appear on the racecourse for nine months.

Jodami returned in January 1991 to compete in novice hurdle races and over the next three months he won five of his six races, ridden by Beaumont's son-in-law Patrick Farrell. Most of his wins were in minor races at tracks in Scotland and Northern England but on his final appearance he carried 151 pounds to a twelve-length victory in a novice handicap at Ayr in which his opponents included the Mersey Novices' Hurdle winner Shannon Glen.

In the 1991/1992 season, Jodami began to compete over larger obstacles as he ran in novice chases. He won minor events at Kelso in November and January and was then stepped up in class for the Grade II West of Scotland Novices' Chase at Ayr. Starting the 11/8 favourite, he made several jumping errors but won by three lengths from the Stayers' Hurdle winner King's Curate. Eleven days later, Jodami raced in the South of England for the first time when he started odds on favourite for the Reynoldstown Novices' Chase at Ascot Racecourse. His unbeaten run of seven races came to an end as he jumped erratically and was beaten fifteen lengths by Danny Harrold. He was beaten in his two remaining novice chases, but showed better form when finishing second to Bradbury Star at Aintree and third behind Second Schedual[sic] when carrying top weight at Punchestown.

=== 1992/1993 season: Gold Cup campaign ===
Jodami's first race against experienced chasers came at Haydock Park in November 1992, when he finished second to Run For Free in the Edward Hanmer Chase a race in which he was ridden for the first time by Mark Dwyer. Run For Free went on to win the Welsh National and the Scottish Grand National later that season. He then started favourite for the British Hennessy Cognac Gold Cup Handicap Chase at Newbury Racecourse, in which his opponents included The Fellow and Party Politics, and finished second, beaten three quarters of a length by Sibton Abbey. Jodami returned to Newbury in January and recorded his first success of the season in the Mandarin Handicap Chase, carrying top weight of 168 pounds to a two and a half length win over Esha Ness. After the race he was identified as a potential Gold Cup winner, and Beaumont reported that the Jodami's owner had turned down several "tempting" offers for the horse. Two weeks later, Jodami and Run For Free met again in the Peter Marsh Chase at Haydock, where the field also included the Grade I winner Gold Options and the course specialist Twin Oaks, who had won eight steeplechases at the track. Dwyer tracked Run For Free before challenging at the last fence, and Jodami took the lead in the closing stages to win by two lengths.

In February, Jodami was sent to Leopardstown Racecourse for the Hennessy Gold Cup a race which as well as being one of Ireland's major weight-for-age prizes, also serves as an important trial for the Cheltenham Gold Cup. The race was dominated by the two British challengers, with Jodami prevailing by a head from the Martin Pipe-trained Chatam. After the race Beaumont expressed the view that Jodami was likely to improve further before the following month's Gold Cup and identified The Fellow as his horse's principal rival. At Cheltenham on 18 March, Jodami started at odds of 8/1 for the Gold Cup, making him the joint second favourite of the sixteen runners, but there appeared to be little confidence behind the horse, as his odds had drifted out from 4/1 on the morning of the race. The Fellow started favourite and the field also included Sibton Abbey, Run For Free and Chatam as well as the previous winners Garrison Savannah and Cool Ground. Dwyer restrained Jodami in the early stages before moving up to join the leaders on the second circuit. Over the last two fences the race resolved into a struggle between Jodami and Rushing Wild, a former hunter and point-to-pointer. Jodami overtook his rival just after the last obstacle and stayed on strongly to win by two lengths, becoming the first Northern-trained winner since The Thinker in 1987. The Independent described the performance as a display of "awesome power" and Dwyer confidently predicted that Jodami would win the race again.

=== 1993–1997: later career ===
Jodami took time to reach his best form in the 1993/1994 season. On his debut at Wetherby racecourse he fell for the only time in his career and then had to be driven out record a narrow success over Cab On Target in the Edward Hanmer Chase. He then started 2/7 favourite for the Rehearsal Chase at Chepstow but was beaten twelve lengths into third by Party Politics, before finishing third again, behind Zeta's Lad and Run For Free in the Peter Marsh Chase. At Leopardsown, however, Jodami re-established himself as one of the best chasers as he won the Hennessy Gold Cup for a second time, beating Deep Bramble by seven lengths. Despite his inconsistent form, Jodami started 6/4 favourite for the 1994 Cheltenham Gold Cup on 17 March. Dwyer employed tactics similar to those employed in 1993, but despite finishing strongly Jodami was unable to catch The Fellow and finished second, beaten one and a half lengths. Dwyer admitted that he was beaten by a better horse on the day, commenting that he was "fighting a losing battle" in the closing stages.

Jodami again ran disappointingly in the early part of the following season. He unseated Dwyer at Haydock before being pitted against the six-year-old One Man in an anticipated race for the Rowland Meyrick Chase at Wetherby. The event proved anticlimactic as One Man unseated Tony Dobbin at the fifth-last fence and Jodami falling two fences later. He was remounted to finish a distant second to the surprise winner Cogent. The highlight of Jodami's season came at Leopardstown where he won his third Hennessy Gold Cup, beating the Irish seven-year-old Merry Gale by three lengths. In this race he rallied on the flat to overtake the younger horse after looking beaten at the last fence. Dwyer received a seven-day ban for excessive use of the whip in the closing stages. At Cheltenham, Jodami looked impressive before the race but failed to cope with the exceptionally heavy ground and finished eighth behind Master Oats in the Gold Cup.

Jodami won one race (at Kelso) from five starts in his 1995/1996 campaign. At the end of the season he ran two notable races in defeat in two of the year's most valuable handicaps. In April he carried 166 pounds when second in the Irish Grand National and a month later he ran fourth under 168 pounds in the Whitbread Gold Cup.

Jodami began his final season by finishing second to The Grey Monk at Ayr in November. He appeared to be in decline, but his last two races, in early 1997 showed that he was still competitive at the highest level at the age of twelve. In January, he conceded weight to his five rivals in the Peter Marsh Chase and won by a neck from Unguided Missile, a victory which saw him made favourite for the Grand National. A month later he contested the Hennessy Gold Cup for the fourth and last time. Ridden by Norman Williamson, he finished second, three lengths behind Danoli and twenty ahead of Imperial Call in third. The performance was achieved despite the fact that Jodami broke down in the closing stages and finished lame. Examinations revealed a ruptured tendon in his right foreleg, bringing an end to his racing career.

== Retirement ==
Jodami spent his retirement at Beaumont's stable. He took part in hunting and spent most of his time acting as a companion for young horses at Brandsby- "nannying the babies" in Beaumont's words. Jodami died on 1 December 2008 at the age of twenty-three after being injured in his stable.

== Assessment and honours ==
Timeform rated Jodami's Gold Cup win as the best performance in the race since Burrough Hill Lad's victory in 1984.

In their book, A Century of Champions, based on the Timeform rating system, John Randall and Tony Morris rated Jodami an "average" Gold Cup winner.

== Pedigree ==
Pedigree of Jodami (IRE), bay gelding, 1985
Sire Crash Course (GB) 1971	Busted; 1963	Crepello	Donatello
Sire Crash Course (GB) 1971	Busted; 1963	Crepello	Crepuscule
Sire Crash Course (GB) 1971	Busted; 1963	Sans le Sou	Vimy
Sire Crash Course (GB) 1971	Busted; 1963	Sans le Sou	Martial Loan
Sire Crash Course (GB) 1971	Lucky Stream; 1956	Persian Gulf	Bahram
Sire Crash Course (GB) 1971	Lucky Stream; 1956	Persian Gulf	Double Life
Sire Crash Course (GB) 1971	Lucky Stream; 1956	Kypris	Victrix
Sire Crash Course (GB) 1971	Lucky Stream; 1956	Kypris	Phinoola
Dam Masterstown Lucy (IRE) 1978	Bargello; 1960	Auriban	Pharis
Dam Masterstown Lucy (IRE) 1978	Bargello; 1960	Auriban	Arriba
Dam Masterstown Lucy (IRE) 1978	Bargello; 1960	Isabelle Brand	Black Devil
Dam Masterstown Lucy (IRE) 1978	Bargello; 1960	Isabelle Brand	Isabelle d'Este
Dam Masterstown Lucy (IRE) 1978	Lucille; 1969	Master Owen	Owen Tudor
Dam Masterstown Lucy (IRE) 1978	Lucille; 1969	Master Owen	Miss Maisie
Dam Masterstown Lucy (IRE) 1978	Lucille; 1969	Pretty Show	Ossian
Dam Masterstown Lucy (IRE) 1978	Lucille; 1969	Pretty Show	After the Show (Family: 8-a)
