= Lord Gyllene =

New Zealand-bred racehorse

- Sire: Ring the Bell
- Grandsire: Rangong
- Dam: Dentelle
- Damsire: Crest of the Wave
- Sex: Gelding
- Foaled: 10 November 1988
- Country: New Zealand
- Colour: Bay
- Breeder: Mrs N. M. Taylor
- Owner: Sir Stanley Clarke CBE
- Trainer: Steve Brookshaw
- Record: 13: 4-5-1 (in Britain); 23: 2-5-1 (in NZ)
- Earnings: £236,101 (in Britain); $20,975 (in NZ)

Major wins
- Grand National (1997)

Lord Gyllene (10 November 1988 – 12 December 2016) was a New Zealand-bred racehorse which won the 1997 Grand National at Aintree. He was trained by Steve Brookshaw for owner Sir Stanley Clarke CBE and ridden by Tony Dobbin. Lord Gyllene was retired by his owner in 2001 due to injury. He had a race record in the UK of four wins, five seconds and one third place from 13 runs, as well as two wins from 23 starts in New Zealand. His final appearance in his homeland was a winning one, in a steeplechase at Te Rapa racecourse in Hamilton on 16 September 1995. That followed his second at Ellerslie in the Pakuranga Hunt Cup, one of New Zealand's most prestigious jumping races.

Lord Gyllene died aged 28 on 12 December 2016.
