= Oats (horse) =

Irish-bred, British-trained Thoroughbred racehorse (1973–1990)

- Sire: Northfields
- Grandsire: Northern Dancer
- Dam: Arctic Lace
- Damsire: Arctic Chevalier
- Sex: Stallion
- Foaled: 1973
- Country: Ireland
- Colour: Bay
- Breeder: T. E. Kelly
- Owner: David Oldrey
- Trainer: Peter Walwyn
- Record: 11:5-3-1

Major wins
- Blue Riband Trial Stakes (1976); Jockey Club Stakes (1977); Ormonde Stakes (1977)

Awards
- Timeform rating: 101p (1975), 126 (1976), 124 (1977)
- Last updated on 15 June 2023

Oats (27 April 1973 – 13 January 1990) was an Irish-bred, British-trained Thoroughbred racehorse and sire. He showed promise as a two-year-old before establishing himself as one of the best British colts of his generation in the following year when he won the Blue Riband Trial Stakes and finished third in The Derby. As a four-year-old he won the Jockey Club Stakes and the Ormonde Stakes before his career was ended by injury. After his retirement he became a very successful sire of National Hunt horses.

== Background ==
Oats was a "strong, attractive" bay horse with a small white star bred in Ireland by T E Kelly. He was from the first crop of foals sired by Northfields, an American horse whose biggest win came in the Louisiana Derby in 1971, before spending most of his stud career in Europe. His other winners included Northjet, Northern Treasure (Irish 2,000 Guineas), No Pass No Sale (Poule d'Essai des Poulains) and North Stoke (Joe McGrath Memorial Stakes). Oats' dam Arctic Lace finished third in the 1969 Irish 1,000 Guineas and was a granddaughter of Fair Alycia, whose other descendants included Bold Lad (IRE).

As a yearling, the colt was offered for sale and bought for 7,000 guineas by David Oldrey. Oats was sent into training with Peter Walwyn at Lambourn in Berkshire.

== Racing career ==
=== 1975: two-year-old season ===
In 1975, Walwyn made no secret of the high regard in which he held Oats, describing him as "a real beauty". When the colt made his racecourse debut in September, he started favourite for a maiden race over six furlongs at Goodwood Racecourse but finished seventh behind the Clive Brittain-trained filly Petalca. On his only other appearance of 1975, Oats started the 9/4 favourite for the second division of the Westley Maiden Stakes over seven furlongs at Newmarket Racecourse in October. He was among the leaders from the start and drew away in the closing stages to win by five lengths from the Henry Cecil-trained filly Helcia.

=== 1976: three-year-old season ===
Oats began his three-year-old season by finishing second to the Irish-trained Malinowski in the Craven Stakes over the Rowley Mile course at Newmarket in April. Two weeks later in the Group Three Blue Riband Trial Stakes over eight and a half furlongs at Epsom Downs Racecourse he took the lead two furlongs from the finish and won from Navigator and All Hope. On 2 June, Oats started at odds of 10/1 for the 197th running of The Derby. Ridden by Pat Eddery, he was in sixth place on the final turn and made steady progress in the straight without ever looking likely to win and finished third, beaten three lengths and a head by Empery and Relkino.

After an eight-week absence, Oats returned in the Gordon Stakes at Goodwood Racecourse in late July. Ridden again by Eddery, he was under pressure throughout the closing stages, and although he made progress in the straight he narrowly failed to catch the Dick Hern-trained Smuggler. In August, the colt was matched against older horses in the Geoffrey Freer Stakes over thirteen and a half furlongs at Newbury Racecourse. He finished second, beaten a head by the five-year-old gelding Swell Fellow after a prolonged struggle over the final quarter mile. In the St Leger Stakes at Doncaster Racecourse in September, Oats started the 6/1 co-favourite, alongside Crow and General Ironside. He finished fourth of the fifteen runners behind Crow, Secret Man and Scallywag.

=== 1977: four-year-old season ===
On his first appearance as a four-year-old, Oats won by ten lengths from weak opposition over ten furlongs at Doncaster and then started at odds of 11/4 for the Jockey Club Stakes over one and a half miles at Newmarket. His opponents for his second race included Smuggler, Swell Fellow, Malinowski and Grey Baron. Oats tracked the leaders before going to the front three furlongs from the finish and maintained a narrow advantage to win from Smuggler. In the Ormonde Stakes over thirteen furlongs at Chester Racecourse in May Oats started the 7/4 favourite. Eddery adopted new tactics, sending the colt into the lead from the start. and Oats won by three lengths from Decent Fellow, with Gunner B in third place. Undefeated in three races in 1977, Oats was regarded as potentially the best older horse in Britain over middle distances, but sustained a serious leg injury when being prepared for the Coronation Cup and did not race again.

== Assessment ==
There was no International Classification of European two-year-olds in 1975: the official handicappers of Britain, Ireland and France compiled separate rankings for horses which competed in those countries. In the British Free Handicap, Oats was allotted a weight of 113 pounds, twenty pounds below the top-rated Wollow. The independent Timeform organisation gave Oats a rating of 101 p, the "p" indicating that he was likely to make more than normal progress. In their annual Racehorses of 1975 Timeform commented that "the best of Oats is yet to come". In the following year he was rated eleven pounds behind Vitiges in the official British handicap for three-year-olds. He was given a rating of 126 by Timeform in 1976, nine pounds behind their Horse of the Year Youth, and was described as "a tough horse, but lacks a turn of foot". As a four-year-old, Oats was rated 124 by Timeform, thirteen pounds behind their top-rated horse Alleged. In the inaugural International Classification he was given a rating of 86, eight pounds behind the top-rated older horse Balmerino.

== Stud record ==
Oats was retired from racing to become a breeding stallion at the Ardenode Stud in Ireland, at an initial fee of £1,500. Oats had little success as a sire of flat racers, but became a very good sire of National Hunt horses. The best of his progeny included the Cheltenham Gold Cup winner Master Oats, the Champion Hurdler Flakey Dove and the Hennessy Gold Cup winner Couldn't Be Better. Oats died on 13 January 1990.

== Pedigree ==
Pedigree of Oats (IRE), bay stallion, 1973
Sire Northfields (USA) 1968	Northern Dancer (CAN); 1961	Nearctic	Nearco
Sire Northfields (USA) 1968	Northern Dancer (CAN); 1961	Nearctic	Lady Angela
Sire Northfields (USA) 1968	Northern Dancer (CAN); 1961	Natalma	Native Dancer
Sire Northfields (USA) 1968	Northern Dancer (CAN); 1961	Natalma	Almahmoud
Sire Northfields (USA) 1968	Little Hut (USA); 1952	Occupy	Bull Dog
Sire Northfields (USA) 1968	Little Hut (USA); 1952	Occupy	Miss Bunting
Sire Northfields (USA) 1968	Little Hut (USA); 1952	Savage Beauty	Challenger
Sire Northfields (USA) 1968	Little Hut (USA); 1952	Savage Beauty	Khara
Dam Arctic Lace (GB) 1966	Arctic Chevalier (IRE); 1957	Arctic Star	Nearco
Dam Arctic Lace (GB) 1966	Arctic Chevalier (IRE); 1957	Arctic Star	Serena
Dam Arctic Lace (GB) 1966	Arctic Chevalier (IRE); 1957	French Ballet	Prince Chevalier
Dam Arctic Lace (GB) 1966	Arctic Chevalier (IRE); 1957	French Ballet	Dancing Time
Dam Arctic Lace (GB) 1966	Alace (GB); 1961	Rapace	Djefou
Dam Arctic Lace (GB) 1966	Alace (GB); 1961	Rapace	Rahnee
Dam Arctic Lace (GB) 1966	Alace (GB); 1961	Fair Alycia	Alycidon
Dam Arctic Lace (GB) 1966	Alace (GB); 1961	Fair Alycia	Fair Edwine (Family 2-e)

- Oats was inbred 4 × 4 to Nearco, meaning that this stallion appears twice in the fourth generation of his pedigree.
