= François Doumen =

French horse trainer

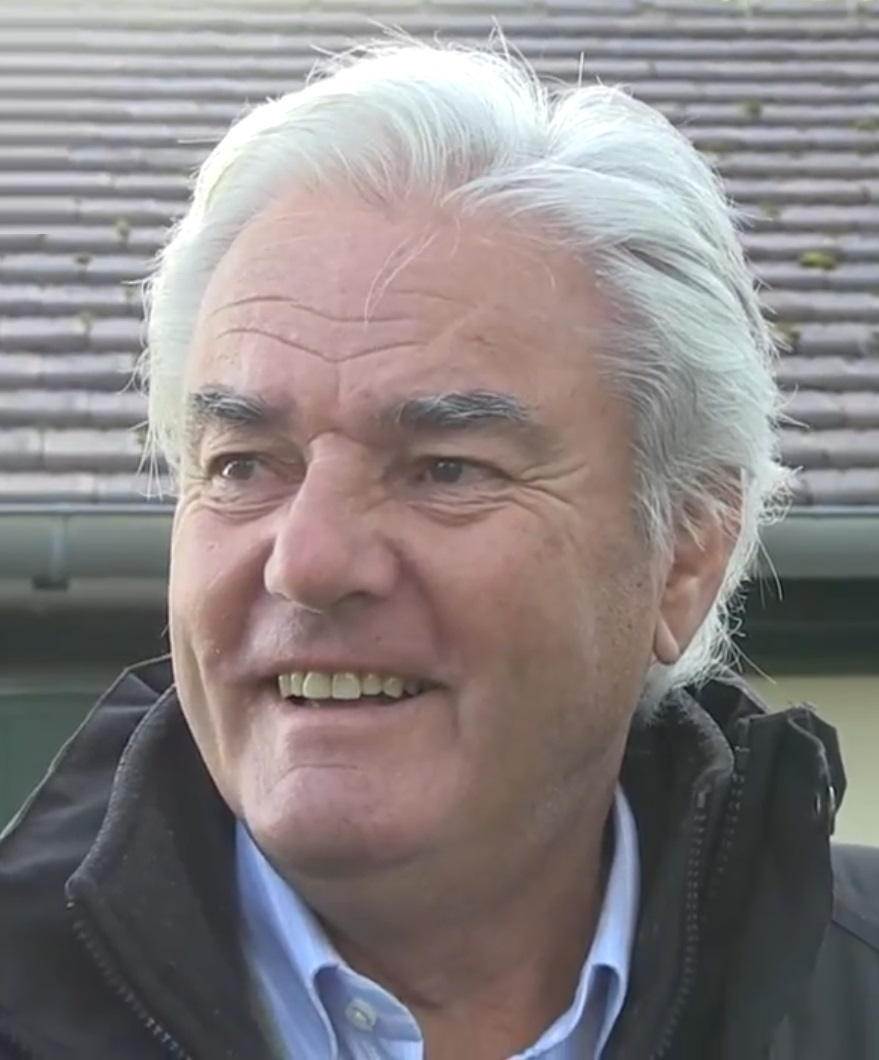
François Doumen in 2014

François Doumen (born 11 June 1940) is a retired French racehorse trainer. He was a winner of the King George VI Chase on five occasions with Nupsala (1987), The Fellow (1991, 1992), Algan (1994), First Gold (2000), and the Cheltenham Gold Cup with The Fellow (1994).

== Life and career ==
Doumen born 11 June 1940 in Angoulême, Poitevin-Saintongeais. As a young man he had also been a competitive slalom skier. From 1956 to 1970 he was an amateur jockey, and he then worked as an assistant trainer to his father Jean, who was a jockey and trainer at Maisons-Laffitte for over 50 years. His older brother Christophe was also a racehorse trainer.

François obtained his own training licence in 1977, working in Boucé, Orne. His first successful outing in the UK was in 1987, winning the Boxing DayKing George VI Chase at Kempton with the 25-1 outsider Nupsala, the first French horse to do so. He won the same race in 1991 and 1992 with The Fellow, who went on to win the Cheltenham Gold Cup for Doumen in 1994.

Doumen stop training jump horses at the age of 70 in 2010, and retired from training altogether in August 2017, after suffering ill health.

Doumen was initially based at Maisons-Laffitte, and he subsequently moved to Lamorlaye and later Chantilly and Boucé, Orne. Doumen was successful in both flat and jump racing, and his most notable horses included The Fellow, Jim and Tonic and Baracouda. His son, Thierry, is also a trainer and a former jockey.

== Major wins ==
France

- Grand Steeple-Chase de Paris - (5) - The Fellow (1991), Ucello II (1993, 1994), Ubu III (1995), First Gold (1998)
- Grande Course de Haies d'Auteuil - (3) - Ubu III (1992, 1993), Laveron (2002)
- Prix du Cadran - (1) - Kasbah Bliss (2011)
- Prix Ferdinand Dufaure - (1) - Ucello II (1990)
- Prix La Haye Jousselin - (3) - The Fellow (1990), Ucello II (1992), First Gold (2000)

Canada

- E. P. Taylor Stakes - (1) - Siyouma (2012)

(United Kingdom) Great Britain

- Cheltenham Gold Cup - (1) - The Fellow (1994)
- Feltham Novices' Chase - (1) - Djeddah (1996)
- King George VI Chase - (5) - Nupsala (1987), The Fellow (1991, 1992), Algan (1994), First Gold (2000)
- Long Walk Hurdle - (4) - Baracouda (2000, 2001, 2003, 2004)
- Sun Chariot Stakes - (1) - Siyouma (2012)
- Triumph Hurdle - (1) - Snow Drop (2000)
- World Hurdle - (2) - Baracouda (2002, 2003)

Hong Kong

- Hong Kong Bowl - (1) - Jim and Tonic (1998)
- Hong Kong Cup - (1) - Jim and Tonic (1999)
- Queen Elizabeth II Cup - (1) - Jim and Tonic (1999)

(Republic of Ireland) Ireland

- Punchestown Gold Cup - (1) - First Gold (2003)

United Arab Emirates

- Dubai Duty Free - (1) - Jim and Tonic (2001)

United States

- Hialeah Turf Cup Handicap - (1) - Double Bed (1988)
