= The Fellow =

French racehorse

- Racing silks of Marquesa de Moratalla
- Sire: Italic
- Dam: L'Oranaise
- Damsire: Paris Jour
- Sex: Gelding
- Foaled: 1985
- Country: France
- Colour: Bay
- Breeder: J Cypres & L Couetil
- Owner: Marquesa Soledad de Moratalla
- Trainer: François Doumen
- Record: 37: 10-4-11
- Earnings: £641,426

Major wins
- Prix La Haye Jousselin (1990); Grand Steeple-Chase de Paris (1991); King George VI Chase (1991, 1992); Cheltenham Gold Cup (1994)

Honours
- French Horse Racing Hall of Fame (2025)
- Last updated on August 29, 2008

The Fellow (1985–2008) was an AQPS top-class National Hunt racehorse in the early 1990s. He won the 1994 Cheltenham Gold Cup and narrowly lost the 1991 and 1992 renewals. He also won the 1991 and 1992 King George VI Chase and the 1991 Grand Steeple-Chase de Paris. Along with Mandarin, he is one of only two horses to win both the latter race and the Gold Cup. A full brother to French Horse of the Century Al Capone II, The Fellow was trained in France by François Doumen, ridden by the Polish jockey Adam Kondrat, and owned by the Marquise Soledad de Moratalla.

The Fellow first came to prominence in Britain when he ran in the 1990 King George VI Chase as a young five-year-old, although the previous month he had won the Group One Prix La Haye Jousselin at Auteuil Hippodrome in France. He finished third in the King George behind Desert Orchid and Toby Tobias, then ran in a French hurdle race before returning to the UK to run in the Cheltenham Gold Cup. He was still a young horse and went off at 28/1. However, despite his age he was only beaten a short-head into second place by Garrison Savannah and defeated a number of good horses including Desert Orchid, Cool Ground and Celtic Shot. In fact, BBC commentator Sir Peter O'Sullevan (possibly biased through being a friend of the horse's owner) thought that The Fellow was going to just get up to win the race.

During the summer of 1991, The Fellow won the Grand Steeple-Chase de Paris as well as two other chases. He returned to the UK for another tilt at the King George VI Chase. In a close finish, he just beat Docklands Express and Remittance Man, with Desert Orchid falling when beaten in his last race before retirement. The Fellow then tried again to win the Cheltenham Gold Cup the following spring. In this race, he lost again by a short head, this time to Cool Ground with Docklands Express in third.

The next season, he won two further races at Auteuil before running in the Hennessy Gold Cup, where he was a good third under top-weight behind Sibton Abbey and Jodami. He then retained his King George VI Chase crown. Although he won the race by 6 lengths, he was outpaced entering the home straight and didn't look like the winner at the second last. He went straight to Cheltenham to try to finally win the Gold Cup. He went off the short-priced 5/4 favourite. However, he was well-beaten back in fourth behind Jodami. His jockey, Adam Kondrat, was heavily criticised by members of the racing press who felt he had kept the horse too far off the pace. Especially scathing in his criticism was John McCririck. The Fellow then was sent off the 7/2 favourite for the Whitbread Gold Cup but finished fifth.

The following season, The Fellow's best performances in his first six races of the season were four thirds. He failed to retain the King George, finishing third behind Barton Bank and Bradbury Star, and then came third in the Racing Post Chase behind Antonin. However, in that race he had stayed on well at the end of the race and was giving substantial amounts of weight away to all of his rivals bar Docklands Express, where it was only 5 pounds. Barton Bank, one of the favourites for the Cheltenham Gold Cup, was injured shortly before the race, which improved The Fellow's chances of winning. He went off 7/1 third favourite. Jodami's mistake at the last fence ended any chance of him stopping The Fellow, who won by a length and a half. Peter Scudamore said about the ride the horse was given: " ...and beautifully ridden by Adam Kondrat, who understandably was very hurt by the illinformed, illjudged comments about his previous Gold Cup defeats." The weights for the Grand National are decided well in advance of the Gold Cup. This left The Fellow with 11 stone and 4 pounds to carry. However, the National is a race where the higher weights have a dire record. Additionally, torrential rain made the ground heavy. The Fellow tired after Becher's Brook on the second circuit where he went down on his nose, he made another mistake at the next (Foinavon), before falling heavily at the Canal Turn (fence 24) when fourth - his form going into the Grand National read; 5-33331.

The Fellow won a race at Auteuil Hippodrome in the summer of 1994 but was well beaten in other races. This included a final effort at the King George VI Chase, where he was pulled up behind Algan. Ironically, that horse had the same trainer and owner as The Fellow. His last race was at Auteuil on 18 June 1995, where he was pulled up.

Racing colours - Red, light green cap.

== Cheltenham Gold Cup record ==
•1991 - Second to Garrison Savannah - 6yo, 28-1.

•1992 - Second to Cool Ground - 7yo, 7-2.

•1993 - Fourth to Jodami - 8yo, 5-4F.

•1994 - First - 9yo, 7-1.

== King George VI Chase record ==
•1990 - Third to Desert Orchid - 5yo, 10-1.

•1991 - First - 6yo, 10-1.

•1992 - First - 7yo, EvensF.

•1993 - Third to Barton Bank - 8yo, 7-2F.

•1994 - PU before three out - 9yo, 7-2.
