= Peter Beaumont (racehorse trainer) =

British racehorse trainer (1934–2020)

Peter Beaumont (1934 – 29 March 2020) was a British racehorse trainer. Beaumont began by training horses on the amateur Point-to-point circuit from his stables at Foulrice Farm near Brandsby in Yorkshire. He was later successful against professional opposition despite never training a large number of horses. He was best known for training Jodami to win the 1993 Cheltenham Gold Cup.

Beaumont retired in 2010 after a 24-year career. He died in March 2020, aged 85.
