= Norman Williamson =

Irish jockey

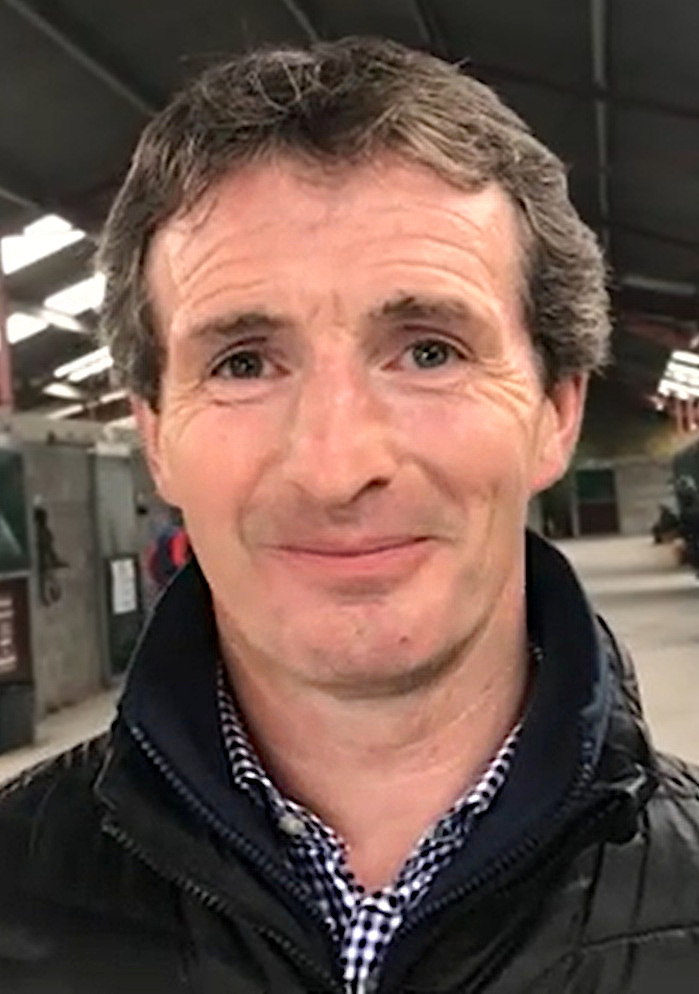
Norman Williamson in 2017

Norman Williamson (born 16 January 1969) is an Irish retired professional jockey who competed in National Hunt racing. He was top jockey at the Cheltenham Festival in 1995 with 4 wins, including the Champion Hurdle on Alderbrook and the Cheltenham Gold Cup on Master Oats. He came second in the 2000 Grand National on Mely Moss.

Williamson retired on medical advice aged 34 in 2003. Doctors warned him not to risk another fall after he had damaged vertebrae in his neck. He had won 1,268 races.
