= Beaufort Hurdle =

Hurdle horse race in Great Britain

The Beaufort Hurdle was a National Hunt Listed hurdle race in Wales which was open to horses aged five years only. It was run at Chepstow over a distance of 2 miles ½ furlong (3,319 metres), and was scheduled to take place each year in early March.

The race was first run in 1971, as the Player's No. 6 National Hurdle Final, and was run for the last time in March 1996.

== Winners ==
Year	Winner	Jockey	Trainer
1971	Killiney	E P Harty	Fred Winter
1972	Celtic Cone^{[1]}	Andy Turnell	Frank Cundell
1973	Dark Sultan	Ron Barry	P Chisman
1974	True Song	Garfield Old	Donald Underwood
1975	Border Incident	John Francome	Richard Head
1976	Winter Melody	Tony Bowker	Jack Hanson
1977	French Hollow	Michael Dickinson	Tony Dickinson
1978	Gruffandgrim	James Guest	Fred Winter
1979	Applalto	Hywel Davies	Roddy Armytage
1980	Run Hard	Steve Knight	Bob Turnell
1981	Passing Parade	Peter Scudamore	Mick O'Toole
1982	Gaye Brief	Peter Scudamore	Mrs Mercy Rimell
1983	Very Promising	Sam Morshead	Mrs Mercy Rimell
1984	Aonoch	Jimmy Duggan	Roger Fisher
1985	Maganyos	Steve Smith Eccles	Nicky Henderson
1986	Canute Express	Mr Lorcan Wyer	Homer Scott (Ir)
1987	Positive	Paul Croucher	Kim Bailey
1988	Rymster	Graham McCourt	Nicky Henderson
1989	Dis Train	Mark Pitman	Jenny Pitman
1990	Sacre D'Or	Seamus O'Neill	John Mackie
1991	Mudahim	Dai Tegg	Chris Broad
1992	Carobee	Richard Dunwoody	David Nicholson
1993	Winter Squall	Richard Dunwoody	David Nicholson
1994	Relkeel	Adrian Maguire	David Nicholson
1995	Challenger du Luc	Richard Dunwoody	Martin Pipe
1996	Divertimiento	Eugene Husband	J Mackie

^{1} The 1972 running took place at Towcester.
