= Gay Spartan =

British racehorse

- Sire: Spartan General
- Dam: Copper Lace
- Damsire: Copernicus
- Sex: Gelding
- Foaled: 1971
- Country: Great Britain
- Colour: bay
- Owner: M H Armstrong
- Trainer: Tony Dickinson

Major wins
- Sun Alliance Chase (1977); King George VI Chase (1978)

Gay Spartan (foaled 1971) was a British-bred racehorse who began his career in Ireland and progressed into a top class steeplechaser after moving to England to be trained by Tony Dickinson. His career was interrupted by injury, limiting his racecourse appearances when he was in his prime.

== Background ==
Gay Spartan's sire Spartan General finished second in the 1965 running of the Champion Hurdle. He was a successful National Hunt sire for many years. The dam of Gay Spartan, Copper Lace, won over hurdles and fences.

== Early career ==
Gay Spartan ran twice over hurdles during the 1974/75 season when trained in Ireland. On the first occasion he was unplaced in a juvenile hurdle at Fairyhouse in December. On the second run he unseated his rider after the start in a similar race at Leopardstown in February. He later won a bumper race before moving to Tony Dickinson's yard in England.

== 1975/1976 season ==
Gay Spartan ran twice over hurdles during this season, winning on both starts. These came at Leicester in January over 3 miles, and at Wolverhampton in March over 2 miles 7 furlongs. He won comfortably on each occasion.

== 1976/1977 season ==
Gay Spartan was switched to fences and ran six times. He started the season by unseating his rider at the fifth fence at Uttoxeter, then was undefeated in his remaining five starts. He won novice chases at Catterick, Wolverhampton and Haydock Park, then was raised in class when running in the Sun Alliance Chase at the Cheltenham festival in March. Run over 3 miles, the Sun Alliance Chase is recognised as the most important event for staying novice chasers. With the trainer's son Michael Dickinson in the saddle, Gay Spartan made all the running and galloped on relentlessly in the heavy ground to defeat Billycan by four lengths. The runner up would win the Irish Grand National on his next start. On his final outing of the season Gay Spartan won a competitive novice chase at Newbury. He ended the season with a Timeform rating of 137. Although Timeform were of the opinion that " he should be a difficult nut to crack where staying power and resolution are necessary for success", they made note of his appearance, stating that Gay Spartan was, "lightly made for a chaser, rather lacking in substance and scope ".

== 1977/1978 season ==
Gay Spartan ran seven times during this season, winning on five occasions. After winning events at Hexham and Warwick, he faced a stiffer task in the Tote Northern Handicap Chase at Haydock Park, where he beat Master H, despite racing on ground that was considered unsuitably fast for him. He then followed up with another victory in heavy ground at Wetherby, then appeared again at the same venue in March for what would be his final outing of the season. He put up a worthy performance to beat Tamalin and Rambling Jack, giving weight away to both who were useful performers in their own right. On the strength of this show Gay Spartan was scheduled to take his chance in the Cheltenham Gold Cup, which was staged in April this year due to the original fixture being abandoned because of snow. He was eventually withdrawn the day before the race as Tony Dickinson was not happy with his well-being. Gay Spartan ended the season with a Timeform rating of 153.

== 1978/1979 season ==
Gay Spartan won two of his four outings during this season and reached his career high point in winning the King George VI Chase at Kempton Park on Boxing Day. He was beaten on his two starts prior to Kempton but put up a notable performance on the second occasion in a handicap chase at Leicester, where he failed by only a length and a half to concede 39 lb to Modesty Forbids. Gay Spartan faced fifteen rivals at Kempton. Ridden by Tommy Carmody, the race was run at a fast pace in soft ground, bringing Gay Spartan's stamina reservations in to play. He went to the front after the third last when the leader Royal Mail fell and kept on stoutly to pass the post five lengths ahead of Jack Of Trumps, with Chumson a further fifteen lengths back in third. Reflecting on the performance in relation to his Cheltenham Gold Cup prospects, Tommy Carmody said, " The further he goes the better he is. I wouldn't be afraid of Royal Mail again. I hope the ground is soft because my fellow will be staying on strongly up the hill". Gay Spartan next appeared in what would be his final start in the Jim Ford Challenge Cup at Wincanton. In a small field, he put up a battling performance to beat Gaffer by two lengths. Gay Spartan was ante-post favourite for the Cheltenham Gold Cup but was unable to run having pulled up lame on the gallops the weekend before the race. He was Timeform's best staying chaser of the season with a rating of 166, 13 lb higher than the Cheltenham Gold Cup winner, Alverton.

== 1979/1980 season ==
Gay Spartan made just one appearance in the 3 mile Sunderland Handicap Chase at Stockton in November. Carrying top weight, he was in the lead most of the way and beat Eborneezersdouble by one length. He was conceding 32 lb to the runner up. Gay Spartan was thought to have incurred a suspensory ligament injury during the race and did not run again during the season. He ended the season with a Timeform rating of 166 ?, the question mark indicating the organisation did not have enough evidence to be confident that the rating was reasonably accurate.

== 1982/1983 season ==
With Michael Dickinson now holding the trainer's licence, Gay Spartan returned to the track as a 12-year-old in March 1983 following an absence of over three years. He won an amateur riders' handicap at Worcester and followed up in another minor handicap at Catterick, beating future Grand National winner Hallo Dandy. He then ran at Cheltenham but the race chosen was the Ritz Club Handicap Chase. Carrying top weight he unseated his rider at the sixth fence. Gay Spartan was also beaten on his remaining two starts, when third in a conditional jockeys chase at Aintree, and when unplaced in the Whitbread Gold Cup at Sandown Park. This was to be his final career start. He ended the season with a Timeform rating of 155.
