= 1996 Champion Hurdle =

67th Champion Hurdle
- Champion Hurdle
- Location: Cheltenham Racecourse
- Date: 12 March 1996
- Winning horse: Collier Bay (GB)
- Jockey: Graham Bradley
- Trainer: Jim Old (GB)
- Owner: Wally Sturt

The 1996 Champion Hurdle was a horse race held at Cheltenham Racecourse on Tuesday 12 March 1996. It was the 67th running of the Champion Hurdle.

The winner was Wally Sturt's Collier Bay, a six-year-old bay gelding trained in Wiltshire by Jim Old and ridden by Graham Bradley. Collier Bay's victory was a first in the race for jockey, trainer and owner.

Collier Bay, had been unsuccessful flat racer, who had become a good handicapper over hurdles before emerging as a potential champion by defeating Danoli in the Irish Champion Hurdle in January. Starting the 9/1 fourth choice in the betting, he won the Champion Hurdle by two and a half lengths from Alderbrook, the 1995 winner who started the 10/11 favourite. Fourteen of the sixteen runners completed the course.

== Race details ==
- Sponsor: Smurfit
- Purse: £208,992; First prize: £127,966
- Going: Good to Soft
- Distance: 2 miles 110 yards
- Number of runners: 16
- Winner's time: 3m 59.00

== Full result ==
Pos.	Marg.	Horse (bred)	Age	Jockey	Trainer (Country)	Odds
1		Collier Bay (GB)	6	Graham Bradley	Jim Old (GB)	9/1
2	2½	Alderbrook (GB)	7	Richard Dunwoody	Kim Bailey (GB)	10/11 fav
3	6	Pridwell (GB)	6	Chris Maude	Martin Pipe (GB)	33/1
4	1¾	Danoli (IRE)	8	Tommy Treacy	Tom Foley (IRE)	5/1
5	1	Squire Silk (GB)	7	Jason Titley	Andy Turnell (GB)	20/1
6	1¼	Mysilv (GB)	6	Jamie Osborne	Charles Egerton (GB)	7/1
7	4	Boro Eight (GB)	10	Richard Johnson	Venetia Williams (GB)	100/1
8	1½	Staunch Friend (USA)	8	Peter Niven	Mark Tompkins (GB)	66/1
9	11	Hotel Minella (GB)	9	Charlie Swan	Aidan O'Brien (IRE)	10/1
10	5	Land Afar (GB)	9	Mick Fitzgerald	Paul Webber (GB)	25/1
11	8	Chief Minister (IRE)	7	Tony Dobbin	Thomas Dyer (GB)	100/1
12	18	Right Win (IRE)	6	Graham McCourt	Richard Hannon, Sr. (GB)	25/1
13	13	Kissair (IRE)	5	Jonothon Lower	Martin Pipe (GB)	66/1
14	4	Absalom's Lady (GB)	8	A. P. McCoy	David Elsworth (GB)	66/1
PU		Mack The Knife (GB)	7	David Bridgwater	Martin Pipe (GB)	33/1
PU		Muse (GB)	9	Paul Holley	David Elsworth (GB)	100/1

- Abbreviations: nse = nose; nk = neck; hd = head; dist = distance; UR = unseated rider; PU = pulled up; LFT = left at start; SU = slipped up; BD = brought down

== Winner's details ==
Further details of the winner, Collier Bay

- Sex: Gelding
- Foaled: 21 January 1990
- Country: United Kingdom
- Sire: Green Desert; Dam: Cockatoo Island (High Top)
- Owner: Wally Sturt
- Breeder: Stanley Estate and Stud
