= Silver Buck =

Irish-bred Thoroughbred racehorse

- Racing silks of Christine Feather
- Sire: Silver Cloud
- Dam: Choice Archlesse
- Damsire: Aureole
- Sex: Gelding
- Foaled: 1972
- Died: 1984 (aged 11–12)
- Country: Ireland
- Colour: Brown
- Owner: Christine Feather
- Trainer: Tony Dickinson/ Michael Dickinson

Major wins
- Embassy Premier Chase Final 1979; King George VI Chase 1979,1980; Cheltenham Gold Cup 1982; Edward Hanmer Chase 1979,1980,1981,1982

Silver Buck (1972–1984) was an Irish-bred racehorse who became a champion steeplechaser when trained in England by the Dickinson family. He was the winner of the 1982 Cheltenham Gold Cup, and the 1979 and 1980 runnings of the King George VI Chase. He was voted National Hunt Horse of the Year in 1982.

== Background ==
Foaled in 1972, Silver Buck was sired by the high class flat middle distance runner Silver Cloud, who in 1962 won the Chester Vase, Princess of Wales's Stakes, and Cumberland Lodge Stakes. Silver Buck's dam Choice Archlesse, won a low grade hurdle race.

== Early days in Ireland ==
Silver Buck made his first racecourse appearance as a five year old, in a National Hunt flat race at Clonmel Racecourse. He won this event and was then campaigned in point-to-point races, winning two of his four starts. He was sold to Mrs Christine Haggas (nee Feather), the mother of trainer William Haggas. He was then moved to England to be trained by the Dickinson family, initially in Gisburn, Lancashire, then from the 1979/80 season, at Harewood in Yorkshire. Tony Dickinson held the trainer's licence until the 1980/81 season, when his son Michael Dickinson took over.

== 1977/78 season ==
Silver Buck ran over hurdles during this season, winning four of his eight starts. The wins came in succession in December and January at Catterick, Worcester, Leicester, and Haydock Park. The last of those at Haydock Park was in the Bristol Novices' Handicap Hurdle, carrying top weight with Michael Dickinson riding. He was then raised in class for his three remaining races. In the first he finished a distant fourth in the Persian War Novices' Hurdle at Chepstow, a race run in the mist on heavy ground. He then redeemed himself in the Sun Alliance Novices Hurdle at the Cheltenham Festival, a championship event for staying novice hurdlers. This was the most valuable and competitive event Silver Buck ran in all season, and he finished fourth of the twenty runners behind Mr Kildare. On his final appearance in the Maghull Novices' Hurdle at Aintree, he finished a long way behind and was found to be lame.

== 1978/79 season ==
Silver Buck embarked on a novice chase program in this season. He won five out of his seven starts, establishing himself as one of the best in his sphere. He won all of his first four starts at Teesside, Wetherby, Stratford and Leicester. At Wetherby he beat Alverton, who himself would go on and win a Cheltenham Gold Cup. He suffered a defeat when brought down at Windsor, then lined up for the final of the Embassy Premier Chase, run over two and a half miles at Haydock Park. The race had been due to be staged in its original spot in January, but the meeting was abandoned and the race saved and moved to early March. Silver Buck came up against the dual Champion Hurdle winner Night Nurse, who had started brightly in his career over fences, winning five of his six starts prior to this race. In a seven-runner field Silver Buck, ridden by the stable jockey Tommy Carmody, started 5/2 second favourite. The race turned out to be a memorable one. Night Nurse went to the front from the beginning and stayed there until being joined by Silver Buck, at the first fence on the far side. They raced side by side until Silver Buck took a definite lead turning for home. Night Nurse fought back, and landed in front over the final fence, but Silver Buck proved the better on the long run in and passed the winning line two and a half lengths clear. Timeform stated that, ' Silver Buck and Night Nurse put on a superb, unforgettable exhibition'. On his final appearance of the season, Silver Buck finished third in the Sun Alliance Chase at the Cheltenham festival, run on heavy ground.

== 1979/1980 season ==
Silver Buck was unbeaten in all of his six starts during this season - he also took a seventh race by means of a walk over. He began the season with wins at Wincanton and Hereford. He next appeared in the Edward Hanmer Memorial Chase at Haydock Park in November. Although there were only three runners, the field was made up of Night Nurse and Border Incident, both high class chasers. Silver Buck beat Night Nurs by one and a half lengths. His next race was on Boxing Day when he lined up for the King George VI Chase at Kempton Park. Silver Buck faced ten rivals and started the 3/1 second favourite behind the Irish trained Jack Of Trumps. Silver Buck was always close up and led down the back straight for the final time. He was never headed after and saw off the challenge of Jack Of Trumps to win by a length and a half, with Border Incident a further twenty lengths back in third. His next lined up at Newbury in February, for the Compton Chase. The race was run on heavy ground, conditions under which he had run below par in the past. He eventually won, beating Royal Mail by two lengths, but failed to impress. In early March Silver Buck appeared in a small race at Hereford, which was to be his prep for the Cheltenham Gold Cup. He won but again was far from impressive. He was later found to have a low blood count which put his participation at Cheltenham in doubt. Silver Buck's connections eventually withdrew him from the Cheltenham Gold Cup on the morning of the race, but this was due to other circumstances. They cited the heavy ground as the reason for him not taking his place in the race.

== 1980/1981 season ==
In this season, Silver Buck won five of his seven races. He started the season with victories at Worcester and Folkestone, then followed up last season's win in the Edward Hanmer Memorial Chase at Haydock Park . He then had a prep race in early December for the King George VI Chase. This was at Catterick, and though beaten a length by Sunset Cristo, he was conceding 34 lb to that rival, who went on to prove himself a useful horse in his own right. Silver Buck had seven rivals to contend with in the 1980 King George VI Chase. He started the 9/4 favourite in the betting, ahead of the Fulke Walwyn trained Diamond Edge, the front-running Irish mare Anaglog's Daughter, and old adversary, Night Nurse . Silver Buck took the lead from Anaglog's Daughter four fences from home, but was being hard pressed by Night Nurse when that rival unseated his rider at the last. The race reader reporting for Raceform that day, John Hanmer, that 'Night Nurse looked the likely winner' before his mishap. Silver Buck appeared once between Kempton Park and Cheltenham, when winning the Jim Ford Challenge Cup at Wincanton by three lengths from Artifice. Silver Buck faced 14 opponents in the 1981 Cheltenham Gold Cup. He started the 7/2 favourite ahead of the Peter Easterby trained pair Little Owl and Night Nurse. Silver Buck was well in contention as the race heated up and had every chance when making an untidy jump at the second last. His stamina then appeared to fail him and he eventually finished in third place, behind Little Owl and Night Nurse. The general consensus was that three and a quarter miles on soft ground was too much of a test of stamina for Silver Buck to produce his very best form.

== 1981/1982 season ==
Silver Buck ran five times this season, winning on four occasions. He was partnered by his new jockey, Robert Earnshaw. He began the campaign with a victory at Wincanton, then suffered an unexpected reversal on his next start in November, in the Rehearsal Chase at Chepstow. He fell four fences from home when already well out of contention. John Hanmer was the Raceform representative at Chepstow that day and wrote, "there was clearly something radically wrong, as this is not his form at all." Silver Buck returned later in the month to win the Edward Hanmer Chase at Haydock Park for the third year in succession, on this occasion beating Sunset Cristo by a length and a half, with Night Nurse a long way back in third. However, the result may have been different if the Irish trained runner Royal Bond had not fallen when challenging at the final fence. The 1981 King George VI Chase was lost to freezing weather, but Silver Buck had injured a hind foot shortly before and would not have been able to take his place anyway. The injury had caused speculation that he might miss Cheltenham but he recuperated in time for him to reappear for a prep at Market Rasen in the first week in March, where he led all the way to successfully give weight away to inferior rivals. Twenty two runners lined up for the 1982 Cheltenham Gold Cup. With heavy ground prevailing again, Silver Buck started at 8/1 in the betting, with Night Nurse, Royal Bond, and Venture To Cognac being preferred in the market. Silver Buck won by two lengths from stable companion Bregawn, with Sunset Cristo a further twelve lengths back in third. Raceform's John Sharratt reported, " ...Silver Buck disproved once and for all the supposition that he does not get the trip in testing ground.... the challenge of his stable companion was just the spur he needed to make him stretch out, and there is not the slightest doubt he won on merit." Timeform considered his Gold Cup victory to be the best performance of his career. He was their Champion Jumper of the season. Silver Buck also received twenty five of the thirty one votes to win the National Hunt Horse Of The Year Award.

== 1982/1983 season ==
Silver Buck won four of his six races during this season. Following victories at Wincanton and Stratford, Silver Buck won his fourth Edward Hanmer Chase at Haydock Park in November, beating future Cheltenham Gold Cup winner, Burrough Hill Lad by two and a half lengths. He then lined up against five other rivals in the King George VI Chase, where he started the even money favourite. Silver Buck could only finish third behind stable companion, Wayward Lad, and the Fred Winter-trained, Fifty Dollars More. Michael Dickinson considered that a throat infection may have affected Silver Buck's performance. Silver Buck prepped for Cheltenham with a victory in a small handicap at Market Rasen. Eleven runners lined up for the 1983 Cheltenham Gold Cup. Dickinson ran five horses in the race and Silver Buck started the 5/1 third favourite behind Bregawn and the David Elsworth-trained Combs Ditch. In a race famous for Dickinson training the first five home, Silver Buck could only finish a distant fourth behind Bregawn, Captain John, and Wayward Lad. Ashley House finished fifth. That was Silver Buck's final race of the season and he was now eleven years old. Despite being beaten in both the King George VI Chase, and Cheltenham Gold Cup, his annual Timeform rating of 171, was only 4 lb below his rating of the previous year. This was based on the merit of his performance in the Edward Hanmer Chase.

== 1983/1984 season ==
This was to be Silver Buck's last season of racing. He ran eight times in all, winning five of his races. He won his first two starts at Folkestone and Market Rasen. The Edward Hanmer Chase was lost to the weather, which meant that Silver Buck next appeared in the Rehearsal Chase at Chepstow in December, where he finished second to the Fred Winter trained Observe. He next appeared at Cheltenham in January, winning the Courage Cup Handicap under top weight. Shortly after he won at Wincanton beating Half Free, then came two disappointing performances in succession, as Silver Buck finished last in both the Gainsborough Chase at Sandown Park, and Greenall Whitley Chase at Haydock Park. His last appearance on the racecourse was a winning one. This came on Easter Monday at Wetherby, where he beat three opponents in the H.S.Commercial Spares Handicap.

== Death ==
Silver Buck died in a freak accident at Dickinson's Harewood stables in 1984. Graham Bradley was aboard him, preparing to make his way to the gallops. It began to rain so they returned to the yard and Bradley changed into waterproofs. As he was remounting the abrasive sound of the waterproofs against the saddle spooked Silver Buck, who took off suddenly across the yard, colliding with a stable block wall. The vet diagnosed a compound fracture of the pelvis, and Silver Buck had to be put down immediately to save him from further suffering.
