= Border Incident (horse) =

British racehorse

- Sire: Border Chief
- Dam: Cuddle Up
- Damsire: Coalition
- Sex: Gelding
- Foaled: 1970
- Country: Great Britain
- Colour: Brown
- Owner: A.M.Warrender and Lord Sudley
- Trainer: Richard Head

Major wins
- Panama Cigar Hurdle Final 1975; Embassy Premier Chase Final 1977; Jim Ford Challenge Cup 1977; Welsh Champion Chase 1979

Border Incident was a British-bred racehorse who first developed into a high class novice hurdler, then later became one of the best steeplechasers of his generation. He had a tendency to break blood vessels and was plagued by injury throughout his career which limited his racecourse appearances. He was physically strong in appearance though often sweated up before his races. He was trained throughout his career by Richard Head at Rhonehurst Stables, in Upper Lambourn, Berkshire, England.

== Background ==
Foaled in 1970, Border Incident was sired by the very useful flat middle distance runner Border Chief, who became a successful National Hunt sire. Border Incident's dam Cuddle Up, was a point-to-point winner.

== 1974/75 season ==
Border Incident made three appearances in his first season, winning on each occasion with John Francome in the saddle. All the runs came in novice hurdle company. After comfortable victories at Newbury in November and Chepstow the following month, he started favourite for the prestigious Panama Cigar Hurdle Final at Chepstow in March. The Raceform representative at the course returned the following comments for the run; 'Jumped well, always prominent, led two out, soon clear.'

== 1975/76 season ==
Border Incident was limited to two appearances during this campaign. On his first outing in the SGB Hire Shop Hurdle at Ascot in December, he appeared to be travelling well but dropped suddenly out of contention to finish unplaced behind Grand Canyon. On his final start in February, he was switched to fences and was not troubled to beat inferior opposition in a novice chase at Windsor. The Timeform organisation went on record as stating that his affliction to break blood vessels looked likely to hinder his career, adding that after he had won the Panama Cigar Hurdle Final during the previous season, he was in their opinion the most promising novice since Bula.

== 1976/77 season ==
Border Incident won three of his five starts during this season, developing into a high class chaser. He opened up his campaign by making all the running to beat Fred Winter's highly touted Snow Flyer over two and a half miles at Ascot in October. He then dropped back to two miles for the Black & White Whisky Gold Cup at the same venue in November. He ran a meritable race in defeat, in front jumping the last fence but being unable to match the pace of Tree Tangle on the run in. Border Incident next appeared in the Old Year Chase at Cheltenham during the Christmas period where he was conceding weight to seasoned performers. He disappointed in finishing unplaced behind his stable companion Uncle Bing, but made a mistake at the third last and had his chance further compromised when hampered by a faller at the next fence. In January, Border Incident lined up for the prestigious Embassy Premier Chase Final, run over two and a half miles at Haydock Park. With Ron Barry taking over in the saddle, Border Incident faced eight opponents which included the promising Irish trained runners Bunker Hill and Tied Cottage, future Grand National winner Lucius, Master H and Zongalero. Starting the 2/1 favourite, Border Incident was this time held up as the front running Tied Cottage set a strong pace. Approaching two fences from home, Bunker Hill had taken up the running but was being pressed by Border Incident who soon went to the front, jumped the final fence ahead, opened up a three length lead and maintained his advantage. Bunker Hill, Master H and Tied Cottage followed him home. The Cheltenham Gold Cup was now his intended target and in what was designed to be his preparation race, Border Incident lined up for the three mile one furlong Jim Ford Challenge Cup at Wincanton. After being held up in the early stages he came through to win by six length from Summerville. Border Incident was quoted as short as 6/1 in the Cheltenham Gold Cup ante-post betting after Wincanton but suffered a bout of sore shins and did not appear again. He ended the season with a Timeform rating of 159. The eventual Cheltenham Gold Cup winner Davy Lad ended the season on 151. Timeform's highest rated staying chaser of the season was Bannow Rambler on 163.

== 1977/78 season ==
This season for Border Incident was limited to a single appearance. This came at Wincanton in October where he was not troubled to beat the 1976 Cheltenham Gold Cup winner Royal Frolic by a length and a half. He evidently suffered a training setback soon after. He ended the season with a Timeform rating of 157 ?, the question mark symbol indicating that there was not enough evidence for them to be confident that the rating was sufficiently accurate.

== 1978/79 season ==
Border Incident again appeared only once. This came in the Welsh Champion Chase over two and a half miles at Chepstow in the spring, after an absence of almost a year and a half from the racecourse. Facing three rivals, he quickened up on the run in under John Francome to beat Young Arthur by half a length. The outcome of the race may have been changed when the former top class hurdler Dramatist, who started the odds on favourite, fell when challenging for the lead at the final fence. Border Incident ended the season with a Timeform rating of 140 +, the symbol indicating that the horse was probably much better than they were able to rate him.

== 1979/80 season ==
Border Incident ran on five occasions during this campaign, winning twice. He reappeared in the three runner Edward Hanmer Memorial Chase at Haydock Park, looking to face a stiff task against Silver Buck and Night Nurse . Ridden by John Francome, Border Incident was in the process of running an encouraging race, close up in third place, when falling at the second last. His next race came on Boxing Day when he lined up with Ron Barry aboard for the King George VI Chase at Kempton Park. Despite facing the most difficult task of his career so far, Border Incident started third favourite at 9/2. Border Incident began to struggle in the home straight and eventually finished third, twenty lengths behind Silver Buck and Jack Of Trumps, giving the impression that he may not have stayed the three mile trip in a fast run race. Border Incident remained at three miles for his next two races. He won both times, though he faced two rivals on both occasions and the events were not run at a true pace. The first of those races was the Fulwell Chase at Kempton in January where, under Ron Barry, he beat the Peter Easterby trained King Weasel by seven lengths. The follow-up victory came in the Fairlawne Chase at Windsor in February. With John Francome in the saddle, he made all the running to beat Cavity Hunter and the former King George V1 Chase winner, Bachelor's Hall. Border Incident's final start of the season came in the Cheltenham Gold Cup which was run in heavy ground. Border Incident started third favourite in the betting at 6/1, behind Diamond Edge and Jack Of Trumps. He unseated John Francome six fences from home when travelling easily in fourth place. Border Incident ended the season with a Timeform Rating of 160, the highest he would achieve in his career. This was 11 lb behind the organisation's top rated staying chaser of the season, Silver Buck on 171.

== 1980/81 season ==
Border Incident was seen just twice during this campaign, winning on one occasion. In the two and a half mile Peterborough Chase at Huntingdon in December, he started the odds on favourite but was stretched to the limit under Ron Barry to beat Royal Charley by half a length. He then incurred a leg injury which caused him to miss the King George V1 Chase. His final appearance of the campaign was in the eight runner Tote Pattern Handicap Chase run over three miles at Kempton in February. This was intended to be Border Incident's warm up race for the Cheltenham Gold Cup but after looking to be travelling strongly, he dropped away quickly and was pulled up by John Francome before the fourth last. The Raceform representative at the course, John Sharratt, wrote that Border Incident, '... looks a mere shadow of the horse he once promised to be.' ". Border Incident ended the season with a Timeform rating of 156.

== 1981/82 season ==
Starting the season as an eleven year old, Border Incident appeared five times, winning once. He made his seasonal debut in a ten runner handicap chase at Wincanton at the end of November. Carrying top weight of 12 stone 7 pounds, he failed by two lengths to overhaul Glen Berg who was receiving a considerable amount of weight. John Sharratt, reporting for Raceform, wrote, ' Border Incident was turned out looking a picture and given a peach of a ride by Francome, ran remarkably well and, bar one minor error, jumped as if he had never been off the racecourse.' ". The next race chosen for Border Incident was the Freshfields Holidays Handicap Chase at Sandown in February. Run over a distance of three miles, the field included the top class Night Nurse, and the rapidly progressing future Cheltenham Gold Cup winner, Bregawn. Starting the 5/1 third favourite, Border Incident began to drop out of contention a long way from the finish and was pulled up by John Francome before the final fence, the race being won by Bregawn. The combination failed to complete the course again on the next outing, which came in the Jim Ford Challenge Cup at Wincanton. After looking to be travelling easily, Border Incident dropped away quickly and was pulled up before the third last. Border Incident next appeared in a four runner handicap chase at Newbury in the first week of March. Dropping back to a distance of two miles and with Peter Scudamore in the saddle for the first time, Border Incident was not troubled to beat inferior opposition easily. The 1982 Cheltenham Gold cup would be the final run of Border Incident's career. Starting at 33/1, he never got involved in the race and was eventually pulled up by John Francome. Border Incident ended his final season with a Timeform rating of 142 ?, the symbol implying that the figure was one not given with confidence. In his autobiography Francome said that when Border Incident was fit he was probably one of the best jumpers he rode.
