= Timeline of the COVID-19 pandemic in England (January–June 2020) =

The following is a timeline of the COVID-19 pandemic in England from January 2020 to June 2020. There are significant differences in the legislation and the reporting between the countries of the UK: England, Scotland, Northern Ireland, and Wales.

== Timeline ==
=== January 2020 ===
- 31 January – The first two cases of coronavirus (2019-nCoV) in the United Kingdom are confirmed.

=== February 2020 ===
- 6 February – A third case of coronavirus is confirmed in the UK.
- 10 February – The total number of cases in the UK reaches eight as four further cases are confirmed in people linked to an affected man from Brighton.
- 11 February – A ninth case is confirmed in London.
- 23 February – The DHSC confirms a total of 13 cases in the UK as four new cases in passengers on the cruise ship Diamond Princess are detected. They are transferred to hospitals in the UK.
- 28 February – The first British death from the disease is confirmed by the Japanese Health Ministry; a man quarantined on the Diamond Princess cruise ship.
- 29 February - The BBC reports the first case of a man in Surrey to be infected with COVID-19 whilst in the UK who had not recently travelled abroad.

=== March 2020 ===
- 5 March – The first death from coronavirus in the UK is confirmed, as the number of cases exceeds 100, with a total of 115 having tested positive. England's Chief Medical Officer, Chris Whitty, tells MPs that the UK has now moved to the second stage of dealing with COVID-19 – from "containment" to the "delay" phase.
- 8 March –
  - A third death from coronavirus is reported, at North Manchester General Hospital, as the number of cases in the UK reaches 273, the largest single-day increase so far.
  - Manchester United played against Manchester City at Old Trafford with 73,288 spectators. The match was later estimated to have caused 27 additional COVID deaths.
- 10-13 March - Cheltenham Festival begins its multiple day event with more than 250,000 attending. The event ended on 13 March. Many blame the event for spreading COVID-19 and the BBC reports "Gloucestershire County Council says any investigation should be led at a national level". The event was estimated to have caused 37 additional COVID deaths, while several of the sporting events also caused thousands of infections.
- 11 March –
  - The Bank of England cuts its baseline interest rate from 0.75% to 0.25%, back down to the lowest level in history.
  - The Liverpool FC vs. Atletico Madrid football match was played at Anfield with 3,000 Madrid fans among the 52,000 spectators, some of whom visited bars after the match. The match was later estimated to have added 41 deaths by COVID-19.
- 12 March – Public Health England stops performing contact tracing, as widespread infections overwhelm capacity.
- 13 March –
  - The Premier League 2019–2020 season is suspended, amid a growing list of worldwide sporting cancellations and postponements due to COVID-19.
  - Elections including the English local elections, London mayoral election and police and crime commissioner elections, scheduled for May 2020, are postponed for a year because of the coronavirus.
- 17 March – NHS England announces that from 15 April all non-urgent operations in England will be postponed, to free up 30,000 beds to help tackle the virus.
- 20 March –
  - Northwick Park Hospital in Harrow declares a "critical incident" due to a surge in patients with coronavirus.
  - Prime Minister Boris Johnson orders all cafes, pubs and restaurants to close from the evening of 20 March, except for take-away food, to tackle coronavirus. All the UK's nightclubs, theatres, cinemas, gyms and leisure centres are told to close "as soon as they reasonably can".
- 21 March –
  - The Health Protection (Coronavirus, Business Closure) (England) Regulations 2020 (SI 327) come into legal effect at 2pm, enforcing the closure in England of businesses selling food and drink for consumption on the premises, as well as a range of other businesses such as nightclubs and indoor leisure centres where a high risk of infection could be expected.
  - NHS England negotiates a cost-price "block booking" of almost all services and facilities at the country's private hospitals, involving around 8,000 hospital beds, nearly 1,200 ventilators, and more than 10,000 nurses.
- 22 March – Boris Johnson warns that "tougher measures" may be introduced if people do not follow government advice on social distancing.
- 23 March –
  - In a televised address, Boris Johnson announces a UK-wide partial lockdown, to contain the spread of the virus. The British public are instructed that they must stay at home, except for certain "very limited purposes" – shopping for basic necessities; for "one form of exercise a day"; for any medical need; and to travel to and from work when "absolutely necessary". However, when these restrictions came into force on 26 March, the statutory instrument for England omitted any limit on the number of exercise sessions. A number of other restrictions are imposed, with police given powers to enforce the measures, including the use of fines.
  - Pride in London, the UK's largest LGBT Pride festival, scheduled for 27 June, is the latest event to be postponed. It is one of a hundred pride events to be postponed or cancelled in the UK.
- 24 March –
  - Health Secretary Matt Hancock announces the government will open a temporary hospital, the NHS Nightingale Hospital at the ExCeL London, to add extra critical care capacity in response to coronavirus pandemic.
  - The Church of England closes all its buildings.
- 25 March –
  - The police will be given the power to use "reasonable force" to enforce the lockdown regulations.
  - Routine dental care is suspended in England.
- 26 March –
  - The Health Protection (Coronavirus, Restrictions) (England) Regulations 2020 (SI 350) (the 'Lockdown Regulations') come into effect, significantly extending the range of businesses that are required by law to close with immediate effect including all retail businesses not on an approved list. These regulations also include significant restrictions on freedom of movement: "no person may leave the place where they are living without reasonable excuse".
  - The 2020 Isle of Wight and Download music festivals, scheduled for June, are cancelled. The organisers of the Download festival subsequently announce plans to hold a virtual festival to be held on the dates it would have happened, and featuring streamed performances and interviews.

=== April 2020 ===
- 2 April – Matt Hancock sets a target of carrying out 100,000 tests a day by the end of the month (encompassing both swab tests and blood tests).
- 3 April – NHS Nightingale Hospital London, the first temporary hospital to treat coronavirus patients, opens at the ExCel centre in East London, employing NHS staff and military personnel, with 500 beds and potential capacity for 4,000. It is the first of several such facilities planned across the UK.
- 5 April – Manchester City football club begins a disciplinary procedure against Kyle Walker after it was reported that he broke lockdown rules by inviting two sex workers to his home.
- 10 April –
  - Jonathan Van-Tam, England's deputy chief medical officer, tells the UK Government's daily briefing the lockdown is "beginning to pay off" but the UK is still in a "dangerous situation", and although cases in London have started to drop they are still rising in Yorkshire and the North East.
  - Beginning today, England's Care Quality Commission requires care homes to state in daily death notifications whether the death was a result of confirmed or suspected COVID-19. The CQC has not previously published statistics; the data will in future be included in weekly reports from the Office of National Statistics.
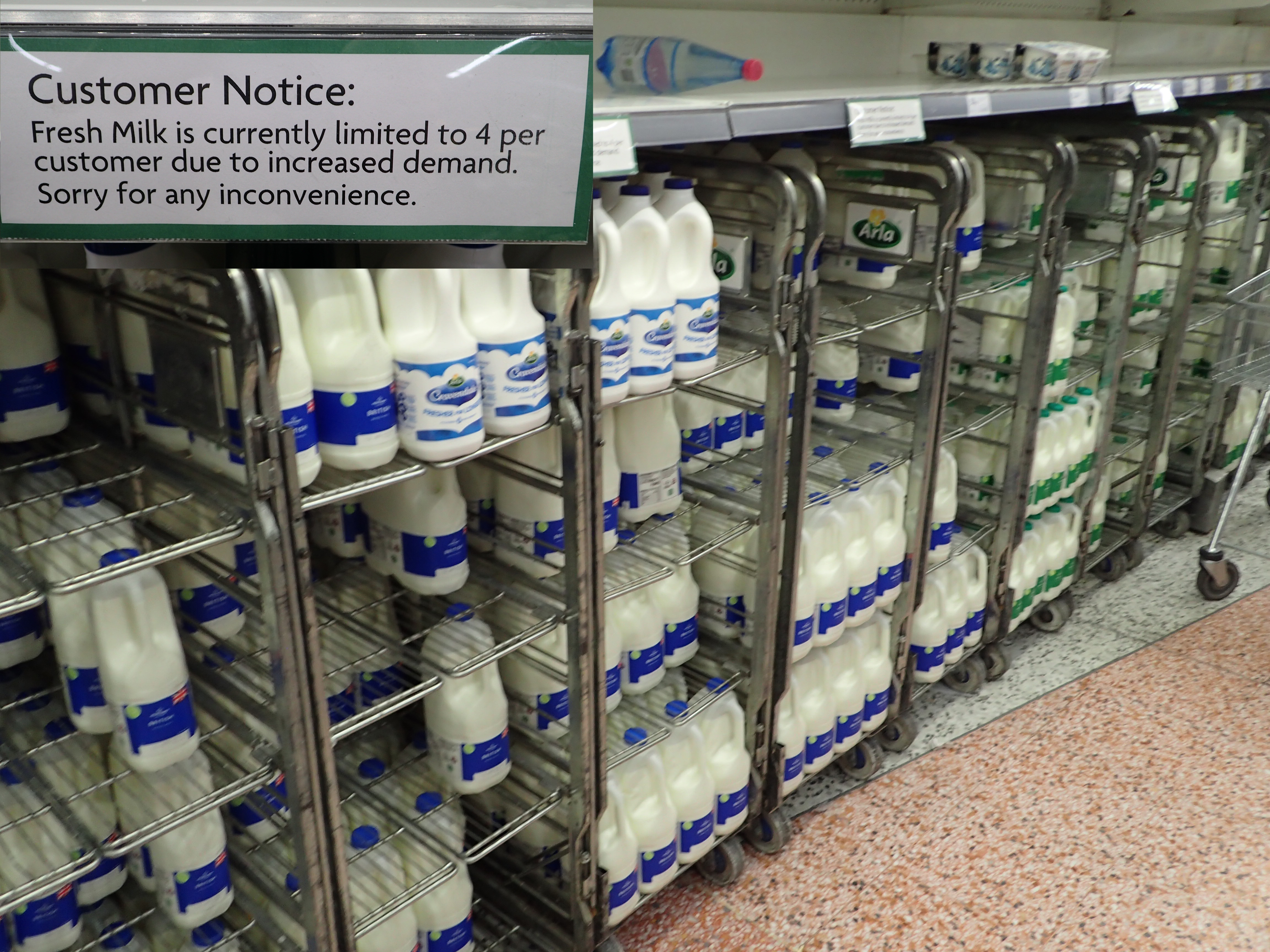
- Milk rationing in April 2020 due to COVID-19 impacts
  11 April –
  - The number of people in London hospitals for COVID-19 reaches its peak, according to week-on-week change data; elsewhere in the country, patient numbers continue to increase, although the rate of increase is slowing.
  - Occupancy of critical care beds in England peaks at around 58% of capacity. Occupancy in the month of April for Scotland and Wales will only briefly exceed 40%, while Northern Ireland reported a peak of 51% early in the month.
- 15 April –
  - Health Secretary Matt Hancock announces new guidelines that will allow close family members to see dying relatives in order to say goodbye to them. Hancock also launches a new network to provide personal protective equipment to care home staff.
  - NHS England and the Care Quality Commission begin rolling out tests for care home staff and residents as it is reported the number of care home deaths are rising but that official figures, which rely on death certificates, are not reflecting the full extent of the problem. Helen Whately, the Minister for Social Care, says that the government are aware the figures are being understated.
- 16 April – The NHS Nightingale Hospital Birmingham, at the National Exhibition Centre, is officially opened by Prince William.
- 17 April –
  - Matt Hancock confirms coronavirus tests will be rolled out to cover more public service staff such as police officers, firefighters and prison staff.
  - Later analysis of death registrations (all causes) in England and Wales by the Office for National Statistics finds the highest total this week, which at 21,805 is 207% of the five-year average for the same week. COVID-19 is mentioned in 8,730 cases.
- 20 April –
  - To protect bus drivers, Transport for London puts buses' front doors out of use, requiring passengers to board through the middle doors. Passengers are no longer required to pay, so that they do not need to use the card reader near the driver.
  - Prof Dame Angela Maclean, the UK's deputy chief scientific adviser, says the number of confirmed cases is "flattening out". The number of people in hospital for COVID-19 has begun to fall in Scotland, Wales and every region of England, with significant falls in London and the Midlands.
- 22 April – The Health Protection (Coronavirus, Restrictions) (England) (Amendment) Regulations 2020 (SI 447) come into effect, correcting errors in the original lockdown regulations and allowing some visits to burial grounds and gardens of remembrance.
- 23 April –
  - A study involving 20,000 households in England, coordinated by the Office for National Statistics, will track the progress of COVID-19 and seek to better understand infection and immunity levels, with volunteers asked to provide nose and throat swabs on a regular basis to determine whether they have the virus.
  - Matt Hancock states that daily test capacity has reached 51,000, and announces that all key workers and members of their households are now eligible for COVID-19 tests and will be able to book tests through the government website from the following day. Tests will be conducted at drive-through centres or using home testing kits, while mobile testing units operated by the armed forces would increase in number from the present eight to 92, with a further four operated by civilians in Northern Ireland.
  - Hancock also announces preparations to reactivate contact tracing in a later phase of the outbreak, including the recruitment of 18,000 contact tracers to greatly supplement Public Health England's staff.
- 28 April – Testing capacity reaches 73,000 per day, although only 43,000 were carried out the previous day. Matt Hancock announces that testing will be expanded from the following day to include all care home workers, and people (and their family members) with symptoms who must leave home for their job or are aged over 65.

=== May 2020 ===
- 1 May – Matt Hancock confirms the government's target of providing (but not necessarily completing) 100,000 tests a day by the end of April has been met, with 122,347 provided over the previous 24 hours.
- 2 May – Some recycling centres, including those in Greater Manchester, begin to reopen after six weeks.
- 5 May – NHS Nightingale Hospital North East, a temporary critical care hospital built near Sunderland for COVID-19 patients, is officially opened by Health Secretary Matt Hancock. The virtual ceremony features TV celebrities Ant and Dec, football pundit Alan Shearer and cricketer Ben Stokes.
- 7 May –
  - Baroness Dido Harding, chair of NHS Improvement and former CEO of TalkTalk, is appointed to lead the government's programme of testing and tracing, supported by John Newton of Public Health England. Testing will be led by Sarah-Jane Marsh, chief executive of Birmingham Women's and Children's Hospitals, and tracing will be led by Tom Riordan, chief executive of Leeds City Council.
  - The 2020 Notting Hill Carnival, scheduled for the August Bank Holiday weekend, is cancelled because of the COVID-19 outbreak.
- 10 May –
  - The UK government updates its coronavirus message from "stay at home, protect the NHS, save lives" to "stay alert, control the virus, save lives". The Opposition Labour Party expresses concern the slogan could be confusing, and leaders of the devolved governments in Scotland, Wales and Northern Ireland say they will keep the original slogan.
  - A new alert scale system is announced, ranging from green (level one) to red (level five), similar to the UK's Terror Threat Levels.
  - A recorded address by Boris Johnson is broadcast at 7pm in which he outlines a "conditional plan" to reopen society, but says it is "not the time simply to end the lockdown this week", and describes the plans as "the first careful steps to modify our measures". Those who cannot work from home, such as construction workers and those in manufacturing, are encouraged to return to work from the following day, but to avoid public transport if possible. The guidance on the number of outdoor exercise periods will be lifted from Wednesday 13 May.
  - Outlining future easing of restrictions, Johnson says "step two" – no sooner than 1 June – would include reopening some shops and the return of primary school pupils, beginning with reception, Year 1 and Year 6; and that secondary pupils facing exams next year would get some time in school before the summer holiday. "Step three" – at the earliest by July – would begin the reopening of the hospitality industry and other public places.
- 11 May –
  - The UK government publishes a 50-page document setting out further details of the phases for lifting the lockdown restrictions. Boris Johnson gives further details as he makes his first statement on the virus to Parliament.
  - Amid concerns about the safety of people returning to work, Johnson tells the Downing Street daily briefing he is not expecting a "sudden big flood" of people returning to work, and that companies will have to prove they have introduced safety measures before they can reopen.
  - The UK government advises people in England to wear face coverings in enclosed spaces where social distancing is not possible, such as on public transport and in shops.
  - Teaching unions express their concern at government plans to reopen schools on 1 June, describing them as "reckless" and unsafe.
- 12 May – The Reading and Leeds Festivals, scheduled for the weekend of 28–30 August, are cancelled because of the ongoing COVID-19 outbreak.
- 13 May – The Health Protection (Coronavirus, Restrictions) (England) (Amendment No. 2) Regulations 2020 (SI 500) come into effect, allowing the re-opening of garden centres, sports courts and recycling centres. In addition to outdoor exercise, open-air recreation is also permitted with no more than one member of another household. Government announcements gloss these with the (non-enforceable) requirement that social distancing must be practised. House moves and viewings are also permitted.
- 14 May –
  - A total of 126,064 tests for COVID-19 have been conducted in the most recent 24 hour period, the highest number to date.
  - Figures compiled by NHS England giving a breakdown of underlying health conditions among COVID-19 hospital fatalities between 31 March and 12 May indicate one in four had diabetes. Other common health conditions were dementia (18%), serious breathing problems (15%), chronic kidney disease (14%), and ischaemic heart disease (10%).
  - The Office for National Statistics publishes results of the early phase of a survey programme in England. From swab tests between 27 April and 10 May, they estimate that 148,000 people, or 0.27% of the population, had COVID-19 at any given time during those two weeks (95% confidence interval: 94,000 to 222,000). This implies roughly 10,000 new cases per day. No significant difference is found between broad age groups. Their estimate for people working in healthcare or social care is higher, at 1.33% (confidence interval: 0.39% to 3.28%). The survey does not include people in hospital or care homes, where rates of infection are likely to be higher still.
  - Public Health England approves a blood test developed by Roche Diagnostics that can detect COVID-19 antibodies.
  - Transport for London is given £1.6bn of emergency government funding to keep bus and tube services running until September.
- 15 May –
  - A report on deaths in care homes in England and Wales from the Office for National Statistics finds 9,039 deaths between 2 March and 1 May, and a further 3,444 deaths of residents in hospital. In this period, COVID-19 was involved in 27% of all deaths of care home residents. Since the last week of March, non-COVID deaths have been higher than previous years; deaths of residents from all causes peaked around 14 April.
  - Matt Hancock announces that every resident and staff member in care homes in England will be tested for COVID-19 by early June.
  - Government scientists and teaching unions hold talks in a bid to safely reopen schools. The British Medical Association voices its support for the unions over their concerns about the safety of resuming classes.
- 16 May – Anne Longfield, the Children's Commissioner for England, urges the government and teaching unions to "stop squabbling and agree a plan" to reopen schools, warning that the closure of schools is impacting negatively on disadvantaged children.
- 17 May – In an article for The Mail on Sunday, Boris Johnson acknowledges frustrations with the government's "stay alert" message for England, but urges the public to be patient as the lockdown measures are eased.
- 18 May –
  - The London congestion charge is reinstated, and buses in London begin charging passenger fares once again. As part of the £1.6bn deal to bail out Transport for London, the congestion charge will also rise from £11.50 to £15 from 22 June.
  - Jury trials resume at a handful of courts in England and Wales, having been suspended since the beginning of the lockdown restrictions.
  - The 2020 Chelsea Flower Show begins, and is held as a virtual festival for the first time.
  - English Premier League football clubs vote to allow teams to begin training in small groups from the following day as a step towards restarting football in England.
- 20 May –
  - At Prime Minister's Questions, Boris Johnson confirms that a track and trace system will be in place from 1 June.
  - The Government faces mounting pressure from councils and teaching unions to reconsider its plans to reopen primary schools from 1 June. Robert Buckland, the Secretary of State for Justice, says the Government is taking all concerns "very seriously">
  - Figures released by Public Health England indicate no new coronavirus cases were reported in London over the 24-hour period up to Monday 18 May.
- 24 May –
  - Samples from blood donors in London during the past week (reported by Public Health England on 4 June) show antibodies indicating exposure to COVID-19 in around 16% of people.
  - Boris Johnson confirms plans (outlined on 10 May) for the phased reopening of schools in England from 1 June: from that date, they will reopen for early years pupils, Reception, Year 1 and Year 6. For the first time he states that from 15 June a quarter of Year 10 and Year 12 students will be allowed "some contact" to help prepare for exams.
- 25 May –
  - Boris Johnson outlines plans to reopen car showrooms and outdoor markets from 1 June, and for all non-essential shops to reopen from 15 June.
  - Weston General Hospital in Somerset temporarily stops admitting new patients because of a high number of COVID-19 cases.
  - The Football Association confirms that the 2019–20 Women's Super League and 2019–20 Women's Championship have ended immediately, with the outcome of winners and relegations to be decided.
- 27 May –
  - Boris Johnson states that a test and trace system will be operational in England from the following day.
  - Premier League football clubs vote to resume contact training.
- 28 May –
  - Contact tracing systems go live in England and Scotland – NHS Test and Trace in England, and Test and Protect in Scotland. However, Dido Harding tells MPs the system in England will not be "fully operational at a local level" until the end of June.
  - Johnson says the government's five tests have been met, and from 1 June in England groups of up to six people will be able to meet outdoors in gardens and outdoor private spaces. Dental practices will be allowed to reopen from 8 June.
  - Premier League clubs agree to restart games on 17 June, with two matches – Aston Villa v Sheffield United and Manchester City v Arsenal. All 92 remaining matches from the season will air live on television.
- 29 May – A rehabilitation centre for COVID-19 patients receives its first patients. NHS Seacole, based at Headley Court in Surrey, is named for the British-Jamaican nurse Mary Seacole.
- 30 May – Boris Johnson announces a relaxing of lockdown restrictions for the 2.2 million people who have been "shielding" in their homes, with them allowed outdoors with members of their household from 1 June. Those who live alone can meet one other person outside.
- 31 May – Some scientists express their concern about the logic of relaxing lockdown rules for those shielding at home in England. In response Robert Jenrick tells the Downing Street daily briefing he is "reasonably confident" the measures are "manageable" but the room for manoeuvre is limited.

=== June 2020 ===
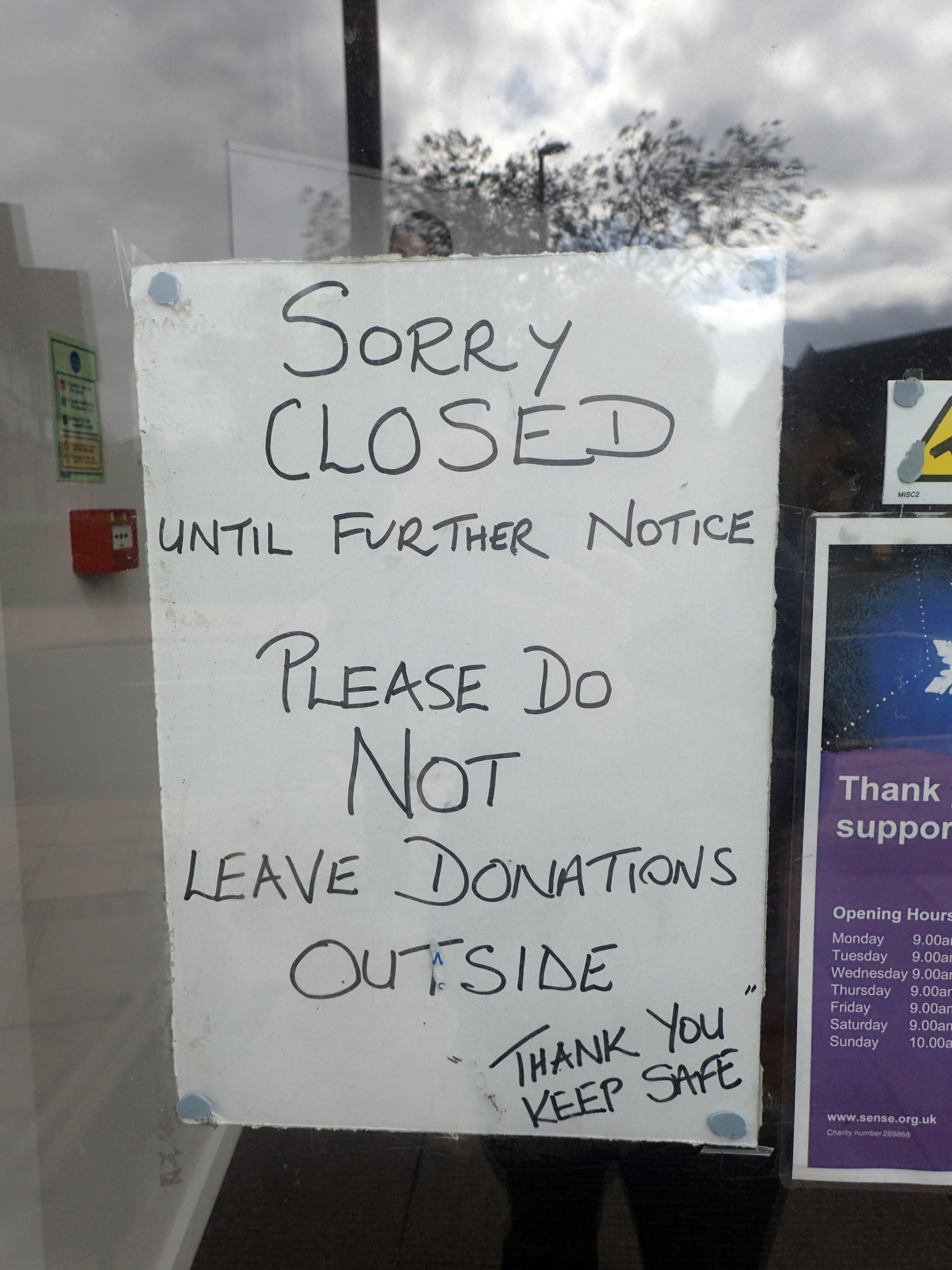
- A sign outside a Sense charity shop in June 2020 indicates an indefinite closure due to COVID
  1 June –
  - The Health Protection (Coronavirus, Restrictions) (England) (Amendment No. 3) Regulations 2020 (SI 558) come into effect, again without prior parliamentary scrutiny. Car and caravan showrooms, outdoor sports amenities and outdoor non-food markets may reopen. The prohibitions on leaving home are replaced by a prohibition on staying overnight away from home, with certain specific exceptions. Gatherings of people from more than one household are limited to six people outdoors and are prohibited entirely indoors, with exceptions including education. There are further exemptions for elite athletes.
  - As primary schools reopen in England, headteachers report a varied attendance rate of between 40% and 70%.
- Furniture retailer Ikea reopens 19 of its UK stores.
  - Horse racing becomes the first sport to return in England after a gap of 76 days, with the first meeting at Newcastle. Snooker also returns.
- 2 June –
  - Public Health England releases its report into the disproportionately high number of people from ethnic minorities dying from COVID-19. The report finds that age, sex, health, geographical circumstances and ethnicity are all risk factors, with those of Bangladeshi origin experiencing a particularly high number of fatalities.
  - The England and Wales Cricket Board confirms England will play three test matches against the West Indies starting on 8 July.
- 4 June – Transport Secretary Grant Shapps announces that face coverings will be compulsory on public transport from 15 June. Very young children, disabled people and those with breathing difficulties will be exempt from this requirement.
- 5 June –
  - Sir Patrick Vallance, the UK's Government Chief Scientific Adviser, says the R number is between 0.7 and 0.9, but could be as high as 1 in some areas of England. His comments come after figures from the Office for National Statistics suggest the reproductive rate is between 0.7 and 1 for England.
  - The UK government's ban on tenant evictions in England and Wales is extended by two months to 23 August.
  - Chelsea are declared the winners of the 2019–20 Women's Super League after the season finished early, while Liverpool are relegated. The 2020–21 season is scheduled to start on 5–6 September.
  - Premiership Rugby announce plans to restart their 2019–20 season on Saturday 15 August, assuming it is safe to do so.
- 7 June – The weekly surveillance report by Public Health England (published 11 June) concludes that the week ending today has "no significant overall excess all-cause mortality". Acute respiratory outbreaks in care homes continue to decline, but there is a small increase in outbreaks in hospitals. New seroprevalence data finds antibodies indicating exposure to COVID-19 in around 4% of blood donors in the South East and East England in the previous week.
- 8 June -
  - The Department of Health and Social Care extends availability of tests to all adult care homes, not just those for over-65s, and states there is capacity to send homes over 50,000 test kits a day.
  - Dental practices can reopen
- 9 June –
  - The UK government drops plans for all primary school children to return to school before the end of the summer term, describing it as unfeasible.
  - The English League One and League Two seasons are finished early following a vote by clubs in both football leagues.
- 10 June –
  - Prime Minister Boris Johnson announces a further easing of lockdown measures in England from 13 June that will allow people living alone to spend time in one other household as part of a "support bubble". The group will be treated as if they are all part of one household so social distancing will not apply, but they cannot switch the household with which they are in a bubble or choose multiple households, and these new rules do not apply to people who are shielding, who must continue to isolate.
  - Johnson announces that plans are being drawn up for a school catch-up programme over the summer months that will allow schoolchildren to catch up with missed schoolwork, with the plans to be outlined by Education Secretary Gavin Williamson shortly.
- 11 June –
  - Figures published by the Department of Health and Social Care indicate that in NHS Test and Trace's first week of operation, 31,700 contacts were identified, of whom 26,900 (85%) were reached and asked to self-isolate. Details of these contacts were provided by two-thirds of the 8,117 people who tested positive during this time and had their case transferred to the system.
  - Figures from NHS England show the pandemic's impact on cancer care. The number of people being assessed by a cancer specialist after referral fell by 60% in April when compared to 2019, with 79,500 referrals. In the same month patients beginning treatment fell by 20% to 10,800 when compared with April 2019.
  - The government comes under pressure from Conservative Party backbench MPs to reduce the two metre social distancing rule, which they feel is damaging the economy.
- 13 June – Parts of the Health Protection (Coronavirus, Restrictions) (England) (Amendment No. 4) Regulations 2020 (SI 588) come into effect. In England and Northern Ireland, households with one adult may now become linked with one other household of any size, allowing them to be treated as one for the purpose of permitted gatherings. This also allows the members of one household to stay overnight at the home of the other. The government refers to this as a "support bubble". The rules on gatherings are also relaxed to allow medical appointments and births to be accompanied, and to permit some visits to people in hospital, hospices and care homes.
- 14 June –
  - Prime Minister Boris Johnson commissions a review into the 2-metre social distancing rule, amid concerns its continuation may make large parts of the hospitality industry not viable. The review will be completed before 4 July, when pubs and cafes are scheduled to reopen.
  - On the eve of the reopening of non-essential retailers, Johnson urges people to "shop, and shop with confidence".
- 15 June –
  - The remainder of the Health Protection (Coronavirus, Restrictions) (England) (Amendment No. 4) Regulations 2020 (SI 588) come into effect, allowing the general re-opening of English retail shops and public-facing businesses apart from those that are on a list of specific exclusions such as restaurants, bars, pubs, nightclubs, most cinemas, theatres, museums, hairdressers, indoor sports and leisure facilities. Outdoor animal-related attractions such as farms, zoos and safari parks may open. Places of worship may again be used for private prayer (but not for communal worship). English libraries still have to remain closed.
  - The Health Protection (Coronavirus, Wearing of Face Coverings on Public Transport) (England) Regulations 2020 come into effect, requiring travellers on public transport in England to wear a face covering.
  - Secondary school pupils in England from Year 10 and Year 12 return to school.
  - The 2020 Great North Run, scheduled for 13 September, is cancelled because of the COVID-19 outbreak.
- 16 June – The UK government announces that the school meals voucher scheme will be extended to cover the summer holidays, allowing 1.3 million disadvantaged children to access free meals during the holidays. The decision is a reversal of an earlier decision to suspend the programme during the holidays.
- 17 June – English Premier League football returns after a 100-day absence.
- 19 June –
  - The UK government announces a £1bn fund to help children in England to catch up with work they have missed while schools have been closed. Education Secretary Gavin Williamson also confirms that all children will return to full-time schooling in September.
  - Dr. David Rosser, chief executive of the University Hospitals Birmingham NHS Foundation Trust (UHB), England's largest hospital trust, confirms there are no COVID-19 patients in the trust's intensive care units for the first time since March. He also says there are signs COVID patients "don't seem as sick, on average, as they were".
- 22 June – The UK government announces that the 2.2 million people in England who have been shielding since the beginning of lockdown will no longer need to do so from 1 August. From 6 July they will be able to meet up outside with up to five other people and form a "support bubble" with another household.
- 23 June –
  - Prime Minister Boris Johnson announces that social distancing rules for England will be relaxed from 4 July, with people required to stay a metre apart but advised to maintain two metres distance whenever possible. He also confirms that pubs, restaurants, hotels and hairdressers can reopen on the same day, but social distancing must be maintained. Spas, nail bars and gyms are among premises that must continue to remain closed. Two households can also meet up indoors from 4 July, and need not be exclusive to each other like the bubble system. Weddings with up to 30 guests will also be permitted.
  - In a bid to assuage concerns from the fitness industry that gyms will not be opening on 4 July, Culture Secretary Oliver Dowden subsequently announces on Twitter that the government hopes to reopen gyms in mid-July.
- 25 June –
  - The UK government announces plans to relax rules for England and Wales allowing pubs and restaurants to utilise outdoor spaces such as terraces, pavements and car parks, while outdoor markets and fetes will no longer need planning permission.
  - Figures from NHS Test and Trace indicate that in its first three weeks of operation in excess of 100,000 people have been asked to self-isolate after being contacted by contact tracers, while the service has contacted three quarters of the people whose details have been supplied to it.
  - The UK government publishes a five-stage plan for reopening theatres. But it is quickly criticised by theatre unions as "meaningless" and "woeful" because it contains no provisions for investment in the performing arts.
- 26 June – Merseyside Police issue a dispersal order after fans of Liverpool Football Club gather for a second night of celebration after the team won the Premier League title the previous day.
- 28 June – Home Secretary Priti Patel confirms a Sunday Times report that the government is considering imposing a local lockdown on Leicester, which has seen a spike in COVID-19 cases. Of the 2,494 cases reported in the city, 658 of them (around 25%) occurred in the two weeks preceding 16 June.
- 29 June –
  - Following a spike in COVID-19 cases in Leicester, Health Secretary Matt Hancock announces the reintroduction of stricter lockdown measures for the city, including the closure of non-essential retailers from the following day, and the closure of schools from 2 July. People in Leicester are advised to stay at home as much as possible, while it is recommended that all but essential travel to, from and within the city should be avoided. Of the 2,987 positive cases in Leicester since the pandemic began, 866 (29%) were reported in the two weeks preceding 23 June, while Hancock says Leicester accounted for "10% of all positive cases in the country over the past week". Sir Peter Soulsby, the Mayor of Leicester has criticises a lack of communication between the UK government and Leicester City Council which he describes as "intensely frustrating".
  - The UK government publishes guidelines for weddings in England, which are permitted from 4 July. Up to thirty people can attend, but without singing and without a reception to follow the ceremony.
  - The England and Wales Cricket Board confirms that the 2020 domestic first-class cricket season will begin on 1 August.
- 30 June – England's exam regulator, Ofqual, says that any GCSE or A Level student who is unhappy with the results they are given will be able to sit exams in all subjects in the autumn. GCSE exams in Maths and English Language only will also be available in early 2021, if needed to cope with demand.

== See also ==
- Timeline of the COVID-19 pandemic in England (July–December 2020)
- Timeline of the COVID-19 pandemic in England (2021)
- Timeline of the COVID-19 pandemic in the United Kingdom (January–June 2020)
- Timeline of the COVID-19 pandemic in the United Kingdom (July–December 2020)
- Timeline of the COVID-19 pandemic in the United Kingdom (2021)
- Timeline of the COVID-19 pandemic in Scotland (2020)
- Timeline of the COVID-19 pandemic in Wales (2020)
- Timeline of the COVID-19 pandemic in Northern Ireland (2020)
