= Jim Ford Challenge Cup =

Jim Ford Challenge Cup
2008
Neptune Collonges	Naunton Brook	Butler's Cabin

Previous years
2007
Little Brick	My Will	Preacher Boy
2006
All in the Stars	Celtic Son	Horus
2005
Heros Collonges	Bathwick Annie	Royal Auclair
2004
Exit Swinger	Royal Auclair	Mister One
2003
See More Business	Iris Bleu	First Gold
2002
See More Business	Upgrade	Kadou Nonantais
2001
Marlborough	Double Thriller	Course Doctor

2000-1991
2000
Spendid	Escartefigue	Mulligan
1999
Double Thriller	Wayward King	Melling
1998
Go Ballistic	Strong Promise	Eudipe
1997
Coome Hill	Unguided Missile	Hanakham
1995
Monsieur Le Cure	Sunley Bay	Garrison Savannah
1994
See More Indians	Another Coral	Second Schedual
1993
Cavvies Clown	Garrison Savannah	Cool Ground
1992
Kings Fountain	Aquilifer	Boraceva
1991
Cool Ground	Arctic Call	Seagram

1990-1988
1990
Cavvies Clown	Cool Ground	Golden Friend
1989
Cavvies Clown	Golden Freeze	Only two finished
1988
Kildimo	Desert Orchid	Burrough Hill Lad

The Jim Ford Challenge Cup was a National Hunt Listed chase in England. It was run at Wincanton over a distance of 3 miles and 1½ furlongs (5,130 metres), and it was scheduled to take place each year in February, on the same card as the Kingwell Hurdle.

The race was last run in 2008 having been turned into a handicap in 2006. During the eighties and early nineties the race regularly featured contests between David Elsworth's locally trained horses (Combs Ditch, Desert Orchid, Cavvies Clown, Lesley Ann) attempting to preserve local honour in the face of invasion by the big battalions from Lambourn (Burrough Hill Lad, Brown Chamberlin, Diamond Edge) and Yorkshire (Bregawn, Silver Buck).

The race was named in honour of Jim Ford, a local trainer who won the 1955 Cheltenham Gold Cup with Gay Donald.

== Winners ==
Year	Winner	Age	Weight	Jockey	Trainer
1971	Kinloch Brae	8	11-11	Eddie Harty	Toby Balding
1972	Bighorn	8	11-11	David Cartwright	C J Vernon Miller
1973	Arctic Bow	8	11-11	Bill Rees	Bob Turnell
1974	Royal Toss	12	11-11	John Oaksey	H Handel
1975	Kilvulgan	8	11-11	Andy Turnell	Bob Turnell
1976	Summerville	10	11-11	Andy Turnell	Bob Turnell
1977	Border Incident	7	11-06	John Francome	Richard Head
1978	Abandoned due to snow
1979	Gay Spartan	8	11-11	Tommy Carmody	Tony Dickinson
1980	Diamond Edge	9	11-11	Bill Smith	Fulke Walwyn
1981	Silver Buck	9	11-11	Tommy Carmody	Michael Dickinson
1982	Henry Bishop	9	11-11	Hywel Davies	Josh Gifford
1983	Combs Ditch	7	11-11	Colin Brown	David Elsworth
1984	Burrough Hill Lad	8	11-11	John Francome	Jenny Pitman
1985	Abandoned due to snow and frost
1986	Abandoned due to frost
1987	Desert Orchid	8	11-11	Colin Brown	David Elsworth
1988	Kildimo	8	11-11	Graham Bradley	Toby Balding
1989	Cavvies Clown	9	11-10	Russ Arnott	David Elsworth
1990	Cavvies Clown	10	11-06	Graham Bradley	David Elsworth
1991	Cool Ground	9	11-00	Jimmy Frost	Reg Akehurst
1992	Kings Fountain	9	11-02	Anthony Tory	Kim Bailey
1993	Cavvies Clown	13	11-02	Graham Bradley	Jenny Pitman
1994	See More Indians	7	10-10	Graham Bradley	Paul Nicholls
1995	Monsieur Le Cure	9	10-10	Peter Niven	John Edwards
1996	Abandoned due to frost
1997	Coome Hill	8	11-02	Jamie Osborne	Walter Dennis
1998	Go Ballistic	9	11-08	Tony Dobbin	John O'Shea
1999	Double Thriller	9	11-05	Joe Tizzard	Paul Nicholls
2000	Spendid	8	11-07	Richard Johnson	Alan King
2001	Marlborough	9	11–12	Mick Fitzgerald	Nicky Henderson
2002	See More Business	12	11–12	Joe Tizzard	Paul Nicholls
2003	See More Business	13	11–12	Ruby Walsh	Paul Nicholls
2004	Exit Swinger	9	11-02	Ruby Walsh	Paul Nicholls
2005	Heros Collonges	10	11-02	Christian Williams	Paul Nicholls
2006	All in the Stars	8	10–12	Daryl Jacob	D P Keane
2007	Little Brick	8	10-07	Tony McCoy	David Pipe
2008	Neptune Collonges	7	11-07	Liam Heard	Paul Nicholls
