= British Steeplechasing Hall of Fame =

Museum in Gloucestershire

Coordinates: 51.918°N 2.067°W

The Steeplechasing Hall of Fame is a museum at Prestbury Park, in the village of Prestbury, Gloucestershire. Opened in 1994 at Cheltenham Racecourse, the Hall of Fame charts steeplechasing history from 1819 and showcases the sport's riders and trainers associated with National Hunt racing.

== Members ==
Michael W. Dickinson

Dick Francis
