= 2020 Cheltenham Gold Cup =

- Cheltenham Gold Cup
- Location: Cheltenham Racecourse
- Date: 13 March 2020
- Winning horse: Al Boum Photo,
- Starting price: 100/30F
- Jockey: Paul Townend
- Trainer: Willie Mullins
- Owner: Mrs J Donnelly
- Conditions: Good to Soft

The 2020 Cheltenham Gold Cup (known as the Magners Gold Cup for sponsorship reasons) was the 92nd annual running of the Cheltenham Gold Cup horse race and was held at Cheltenham Racecourse, Gloucestershire, England, on 13 March 2020.

The race was won for the second year in a row by Al Boum Photo, ridden by Paul Townend and trained by Willie Mullins. The race was held during the COVID-19 pandemic in the United Kingdom, which later caused controversy as some scientists believed the meeting led to an increase of infections and deaths.

== Details ==
- Sponsor: Magners
- Winner's prize money: £351,687.50
- Going: Good to Soft
- Number of runners: 12
- Winner's time: 6m 50.38s

== Full result ==
	*	Horse	Age	Jockey	Trainer ^{†}	SP
1		Al Boum Photo	8	Paul Townend	Willie Mullins (IRE)	9/4 Fav
2	nk	Santini	8	Nico de Boinville	Nicky Henderson	5/1
3	1.25	Lostintranslation	8	Robbie Power	Colin Tizzard	10/1
4	nk	Monalee	9	Rachael Blackmore	Henry de Bromhead (IRE)	20/1
5	4.5	Delta Work	7	Mark Walsh	Gordon Elliott (IRE)	5/1
6	1	Real Steel	7	Brian Hughes	Willie Mullins (IRE)	50/1
7	4.75	Kemboy	8	Patrick Mullins	Willie Mullins (IRE)	8/1
8	5	Clan des Obeaux	8	Harry Cobden	Paul Nicholls	7/1
9	1.75	Bristol de Mai	9	Daryl Jacob	Nigel Twiston-Davies	18/1
10	shd	Chris's Dream	8	Aidan Coleman	Henry de Bromhead (IRE)	20/1
11	nk	Elegant Escape	8	Jonjo O'Neill Jr	Colin Tizzard	66/1
F		Presenting Percy	9	Davy Russell	Pat Kelly	10/1

* The distances between the horses are shown in lengths
† Trainers are based in Great Britain unless indicated. PU = pulled-up. F = fell. shd = short head. nk = neck.
