= Bregawn =

Irish racehorse

- Racing silks of Martin and James Kennelly
- Sire: Saint Denys
- Dam: Miss Society
- Damsire: Dionisio
- Sex: Gelding
- Foaled: 1974
- Country: Ireland
- Colour: Chestnut
- Owner: Martin Kennelly/James Kennelly
- Trainer: Michael Dickinson

Major wins
- Cheltenham Gold Cup (1983); Hennessy Gold Cup (1982); Peter Marsh Chase (1982); Great Yorkshire Chase (1982); Gainsborough Chase (1982); Mildmay Novices' Chase (1981)

Bregawn (foaled 1974) was an Irish-bred racehorse who developed into a top class steeplechaser. He is best known for winning the 1983 running of the Cheltenham Gold Cup, when his trainer Michael Dickinson trained the first five runners home.

== Background ==
Bregawn was foaled in 1974 in Ireland. His sire, Saint Denys, finished second in the 1962 running of the Irish 2,000 Guineas. His dam was unraced.

== Early career ==
Bregawn went into training with Chris Kinane in Ireland. He won a bumpers event in early 1979, then a maiden hurdle race at Limerick in December of the same year. On his sixth and final start of the 1979/80 season, he was sent over to Aintree, where he finished second in an amateur riders' handicap hurdle. After that run he remained in England and was transferred to the stables of Michael Dickinson.

== 1980/1981 season ==
Switched straight to fences, Bregawn ran twelve times during this season, winning on six occasions. The victories came at Market Rasen, Catterick, Wetherby, Warwick, Newcastle and Aintree. He did however fail to complete the course on four occasions, and when he won at Warwick the Raceform representative reporting on the day, Ivor Markham, noted that "he is still inclined to go right at his fences and makes hard work of jumping." Bregawn had progressed enough to take his chance in the Ritz Club Handicap Chase at Cheltenham in March. He was leading in that event when falling three fences from home. The Timeform organisation stated that, "in our opinion Bregawn would have won had he stood up." In his final race of the season he won the Siematic Kitchens Novices Chase at the Aintree Grand National meeting. Bregawn did not have a regular rider during the season and was partnered by a different rider for each victory.

== 1981/1982 season ==
Bregawn developed into a high class chaser during this season. He won four of his six starts and in his last run he finished runner up to his stable companion Silver Buck in the Cheltenham Gold Cup. Bregawn's winning reappearance in a small handicap chase at Market Rasen was his only start before Christmas. He next appeared in the Peter Marsh Chase at Haydock Park, where he took advantage of the 19 lb in weight he received from Night Nurse, to beat that rival by five lengths. Bregawn ran again a week later in the Great Yorkshire Chase at Doncaster. On his previous two starts he had been ridden by Graham Bradley and Robert Earnshaw, who were both attached to the Dickinson yard. At Doncaster John Francome was aboard. Bregawn started the 11/8 favourite on the strength of his victory the previous weekend. He led four fences from home and won by two and a half lengths from Megan's Boy. With a growing reputation, Bregawn made another quick reappearance seven days later in the Freshfields Holidays Handicap Chase at Sandown. With Robert Earnshaw back on board, Bregawn started the 3/1 favourite, went into the lead five fences form home and beat Saint Fillans by five lengths. Night Nurse, who was concededing 20 lb in weight to Bregawn, was a further two lengths back in third. Bregawn was next seen in the Greenall Whitley Chase at Haydock Park in early March. Starting the 11/10 favourite, he failed by a length to concede 9 lb to the winner Scot Lane, running on strongly late on after being interfered with by a faller two fences from the finish. The Raceform representative was of the opinion that Bregawn, " must be considered an unlucky loser".

Bregawn's final appearance of the season came in the Cheltenham Gold Cup. This was the stiffest task of his career so far and he started at odds of 18/1 in a twenty two runner field. With Graham Bradley in the saddle, Bregawn was prominent all the way and he and his stable companion Silver Buck fought out the contest from two fences out. Silver Buck eventually came out on top by two lengths, with a twelve length gap back to the third horse home, Sunset Cristo. Bregawn finished the season with a Timeform rating of 174, one pound behind his stable companion Silver Buck, who was voted National Hunt Horse of the Year.

== 1982/1983 season ==
Bregawn ran seven times during this season, winning on five occasions, and culminating with victory in the Cheltenham Gold Cup. After beginning the season with victory in a minor event at Newton Abbott in October, Bregawn was not hard pressed to win the four runner Rehearsal Chase at Chepstow in early November. Bregawn then lined up for the Hennessy Gold Cup at Newbury on the final Saturday of November. Ridden by his now regular rider Graham Bradley, Bregawn carried the second top weight of 11 stone 10 lb, 2 lb lower than the top weight, Night Nurse. Starting the 9/4 favourite, he fought out the later stages of the race with his stable companion Captain John, to whom he was conceding 10 lb. In an exciting finish, Bregawn made a bad mistake at the final fence, nearly unseating Bradley, and started the run-in three lengths behind his rival. He then found extra reserves to chase down and pass Captain John and passed the line three lengths ahead. Describing the performance, Timeform stated," the closing stages of the Hennessy underlined Bregawn's battling qualities and his tremendous zest for racing." Bregawn was beaten in his next start, the Tommy Whittle Chase at Haydock Park by his sole rival, the 1981 Cheltenham Gold Cup winner Little Owl. Bregawn was said to have pulled a muscle and this would keep him out of the King George VI Chase. Bregawn was next seen on 24 February in the Jim Ford Challenge Cup at Wincanton. In a seven runner event, he started the 6/5 favourite and was beaten half a length by Comb's Ditch. The Timeform representative at the course reported that Bregawn was "very much in need of the race - he looked quite distressed afterwards and blew very hard".

A field of eleven lined up for the 1983 Cheltenham Gold Cup run on soft ground. Bregawn went off the 100/30 favourite ahead of Comb's Ditch at 9/2. Then came two of Bregawn's stable companions Silver Buck and Wayward Lad at 5/1 and 6/1 respectively. The Fred Winter trained pair of Fifty Dollars More and Brown Chamberlin came next in the betting followed by the other two Dickinson runners, Captain John and Ashley House. In a race famous for Michael Dickinson training the first five home, Bregawn went to the front at the fifth fence and remained ahead from then on, seeing off the strong challenges of stable companions Captain John and Wayward Lad in the later stages of the race. Bregawn passed the post five lengths ahead of Captain John, with a further length and a half back to Wayward Lad in third. There was then a large gap back to the other two Dickinson runners, Silver Buck and Ashley House.

Bregawn ended the season as Timeform's best staying chaser, with a rating of 177, behind only the two-mile champion Badsworth Boy, another Michael Dickinson trained horse who received a rating of 179. Bregawn would never repeat the level of the form shown during this season. In respect of the Gold Cup performance, Graham Bradley is on record as saying, " I firmly believe that he was so brave that day and put in so much effort that he was totally exhausted. It blew his mind and, a bit like a boxer who wins a championship but gets badly beaten doing it, Bregawn just didn't want to go through the pain barrier again".

== 1983/1984 season ==
Bregawn ran seven times during this season without winning. He often showed signs of temperament and even refused during the Jim Ford Chase at Wincanton. On other occasions he dropped himself out of contention and tried to pull himself up when tried in blinkers in the 1984 Cheltenham Gold Cup. The Timeform organisation, commenting on Bregawn's season, said that he, " fell from grace faster than Icarus", and their advice to punters was, " Bregawn is best left severely alone nowadays ".

== 1984/1985 season ==
Bregawn was trained in Ireland during this, his last season racing. His first run of the season was from the stable of Martin Cullinane, and the remaining three runs after being moved to the yard of Paddy Mullins. He won a handicap hurdle at Limerick in March, then was sent to England to run in the 1985 Cheltenham Gold Cup in which he was tailed off when refusing at the last. This was to be his final race.

== Retirement ==
Bregawn enjoyed a long retirement at his owner's stud in Mylerstown, Ireland, spending much of his time out at grass with the owner's foals and yearlings. He died in 2007.
