= Collier Bay (horse) =

British-bred Thoroughbred racehorse

- Racing silks of Lord Derby and Wally Sturt
- Sire: Green Desert
- Grandsire: Danzig
- Dam: Cockatoo Island
- Damsire: High Top
- Sex: Gelding
- Foaled: 21 January 1990
- Country: United Kingdom
- Colour: Bay
- Breeder: Stanley Estate and Stud
- Owner: Lord Derby; Wally Sturt
- Trainer: John Gosden; Jim Old
- Record: 39:10-7-4
- Earnings: £247,786

Major wins
- Imperial Cup (1995); Irish Champion Hurdle (1996); Champion Hurdle (1996)

Collier Bay (21 January 1990 – 10 December 2017) was a British Thoroughbred racehorse. He was a moderate performer on the flat, winning one minor race from fourteen attempts. He showed considerable improvement when switched to hurdling winning several important races including the Irish Champion Hurdle at Leopardstown and the Champion Hurdle at Cheltenham. He later had some success as a steeplechaser, but was increasingly affected by respiratory problems and was retired from racing in 2001.

== Background ==
Collier Bay was a dark-coated bay horse with a small white star, bred by his owner, Lord Derby's Stanley Stud. He was sired by the July Cup winner Green Desert whose other offspring include Desert Prince, Sheikh Albadou and Cape Cross, the sire of Sea the Stars. Collier Bay's dam, Cockatoo Island, was a descendant of Sun Stream, a mare who won the 1000 Guineas and Epsom Oaks for a former Earl of Derby in 1945.

Collier Bay was originally sent into training with the leading flat trainer John Gosden at Stanley House Stables in Newmarket, England.

== Racing career ==
=== 1992–1993: flat racing career ===
Collier Bay began his racing career as a two-year-old in the autumn of 1992 by finishing unplaced in maiden races at Newmarket and Leicester. In the following season, he ran ten times, mainly in low grade handicap races. His only success came at Salisbury in August, when he was ridden by Frankie Dettori to a three length win in a £4,000 maiden race. At the end of the season, he had an official rating of 75, approximately forty pounds below top class.

In October 1993, the colt was sent to the Tattersalls sales at Newmarket. He was bought for 46,000 guineas, by the Curragh Bloodstock Agency, acting on behalf of the trainer Jim Old and his patron Wally Sturt. Collier Bay was gelded and prepared for a National Hunt career at Old's stables at Upper Herdswick Farm near Barbury Castle in Wiltshire.

=== 1994–1998: hurdle racing ===
Collier Bay began his hurdling career running in Novice hurdle races in the second half of the 1993/4 season running three times and winning twice. In February he won a minor race by twenty lengths at Lingfield and the following month he won a similar event at Newton Abbot by a distance (more than thirty lengths). A brief return to the flat was unsuccessful as he finished unplaced in a handicap at Newbury.

The 1994/5 season saw Collier Bay racing against more experienced hurdlers. As in the previous year, he was ridden in all his races by Tom Grantham. On his seasonal debut he was moved up in class, but finished last of the four runners behind Large Action in the Grade Two Gerry Feilden Hurdle at Newbury. Two weeks later he finished fourth in a handicap at Cheltenham and was then off the course for three months. In March, Collier Bay was sent to Sandown to contest the Imperial Cup, a handicap hurdle for which he was assigned a weight of 142 pounds. Grantham sent the gelding into a clear lead approaching the final hurdle and he pulled away to win by eleven lengths. Four days later he made his first appearance at the Cheltenham Festival and finished fourth of the thirty runners in the Coral Cup.

Collier Bay did not appear again on a racecourse until January 1996. The field for the Bonusprint Handicap Hurdle at Sandown included several leading hurdlers including Oh So Risky, runner-up in the 1994 Champion Hurdle and the mare Absalom's Lady, who had won the Grade One Christmas Hurdle. Ridden for the first time by Graham Bradley, Collier Bay took the lead two hurdles from the finish and won by seven lengths at odds of 25/1. Two weeks later, Collier Bay was moved up to Grade One class for the Irish Champion Hurdle at Leopardstown in which he was matched against some of the best Irish hurdlers at level weights. Jamie Osborne tracked the leaders on Collier Bay, before moving the English gelding into the lead at the second last. He was headed by Minella Lad at the last hurdle but rallied in the closing stages to regain the lead and win by a head, with Danoli half a length back in third. Collier Bay's win was almost ignored, as the crowd and media focused their attention on the popular Danoli, who was returning after a career-threatening injury.

In the Champion Hurdle, it was expected that Osborne would ride Collier Bay, with Bradley partnering the favourite and reigning champion Alderbrook. Shortly before the race, Bradley was dismissed by Alderbrook's trainer, Kim Bailey, when the jockey failed to appear to ride the horse in an exercise gallop. Bradley claimed that his alarm clock had malfunctioned on the morning after he had attended a fellow jockey's birthday party. Osborne meanwhile, had abandoned Collier Bay in favour of the Triumph Hurdle-winning mare Mysilv. The result was that Richard Dunwoody rode Alderbrook, while Bradley was booked to ride Collier Bay. Racing on soft ground, Collier Bay was the 9/1 fourth choice in the betting for the Champion Hurdle behind Alderbrook (10/11), Danoli (5/1) and Mysilv (7/1). Bradley positioned the gelding in second behind Mysilv before going into the lead at the second last hurdle: according to Bradley, Jamie Osborne "let me have a few expletives when he realised he had chosen the wrong one". Collier Bay went clear of the field and held the late challenge of Alderbrook to win by two and a half lengths.

After a break of almost eleven months, during which he escaped without injury when fire swept through Jim Old's stable, Collier Bay returned in February 1997 at Towcester. He started odds-on favourite for the Champion Hurdle Trial and won by three quarters of a length from Relkeel. On his return to Cheltenham, he was made 4/1 second favourite for the Champion Hurdle, although Old was worried by the faster ground. He made no impression in the race won by Make A Stand making several jumping mistakes and being tailed off in last place when Bradley pulled him up. He did not run again in the 1996/7 National Hunt season, but finished fourth in a flat race at Haydock Park eighteen days after his poor run at Cheltenham. In his final season over hurdles, Collier Bay ran three times. He was placed in the Bula Hurdle and the Champion Hurdle Trial but missed Cheltenham and was pulled up in the Aintree Hurdle.

=== 1998–2001: steeplechasing ===
In the 1998/9 National Hunt season, Collier Bay was switched from hurdles to compete over larger obstacles in Novice Chases. He had his most active campaign since the 1993 flat season, running six times and winning races at Newton Abbot and Huntingdon. He also finished second in the Grade II Reynoldstown Novices' Chase at Ascot and ran fourth behind the future Cheltenham Gold Cup winner Looks Like Trouble in the Grade I RSA Chase.

Hopes that Collier Bay would develop into a top class steeplechaser however, were not fulfilled as health problems restricted him to only four races in the next two years. After being pulled up suffering breathing difficulties in a handicap chase at Newton Abbot in April 2001, he was retired from racing.

== Retirement ==
Collier Bay spent his retirement in the care of Old's secretary Emma Grierson. He died in December 2017 at the age of 27. Remembering his champion Jim Old said "He was a street-fighting thug and would drop you as a pastime at home but as far as I’m concerned he was career defining. He was a real character and had a great retirement".

== Pedigree ==
Pedigree of Collier Bay (GB), bay gelding, 1990
Sire Green Desert (USA) 1983	Danzig; 1977	Northern Dancer	Nearctic
Sire Green Desert (USA) 1983	Danzig; 1977	Northern Dancer	Natalma
Sire Green Desert (USA) 1983	Danzig; 1977	Pas de Nom	Admirals Voyage
Sire Green Desert (USA) 1983	Danzig; 1977	Pas de Nom	Petitioner
Sire Green Desert (USA) 1983	Foreign Courier; 1979	Sir Ivor	Sir Gaylord
Sire Green Desert (USA) 1983	Foreign Courier; 1979	Sir Ivor	Attica
Sire Green Desert (USA) 1983	Foreign Courier; 1979	Courtly Dee	Never Bend
Sire Green Desert (USA) 1983	Foreign Courier; 1979	Courtly Dee	Tulle
Dam Cockatoo Island 1984	High Top; 1969	Derring-Do	Darius
Dam Cockatoo Island 1984	High Top; 1969	Derring-Do	Sipsey Bridge
Dam Cockatoo Island 1984	High Top; 1969	Camenae	Vimy
Dam Cockatoo Island 1984	High Top; 1969	Camenae	Madrilene
Dam Cockatoo Island 1984	Gold Coast; 1971	Mourne	Vieux Manoir
Dam Cockatoo Island 1984	Gold Coast; 1971	Mourne	Ballynash
Dam Cockatoo Island 1984	Gold Coast; 1971	Riviera	Nearco
Dam Cockatoo Island 1984	Gold Coast; 1971	Riviera	Sun Stream (Family:8-g)
