= Broadway Novices' Chase =

Steeplechase horse race in Britain

Brown Advisory Novices' Chase
- Class: Grade 1
- Location: Cheltenham Racecourse; Cheltenham, England
- Race type: Chase
- Sponsor: Brown Advisory & Meriebelle Stable
- Website: Cheltenham

Race information
- Distance: 3m 110y (4,928 metres)
- Surface: Turf
- Track: Left-handed
- Qualification: Five-years-old and up
- Weight: 11 st 3 lb (5yo); 11 st 7 lb (6yo+); Allowances; 7 lb for mares
- Purse: £200,000 (2025); 1st: £112,540

Brown Advisory Novices Chase
2026
Kitzbuhel	Final Demand	Salver

Previous years
2025
Lecky Watson	Stellar Story	Better Days Ahead
2024
Fact To File	Monty's Star	Giovinco
2023
The Real Whacker	Gerri Colombe	Bronn
2022
L'Homme Presse	Ahoy Senor	Gaillard Du Mesnil
2021
Monkfish	Fiddlerontheroof	The Big Breakaway
2020
Champ	Minella Indo	Allaho
2019
Topofthegame	Santini	Delta Work
2018
Presenting Percy	Monalee	Elegant Escape
2017
Might Bite	Whisper	Bellshill
2016
Blaklion	Shaneshill	More of That
2015
Don Poli	Southfield Theatre	Wounded Warrior
2014
O'Faolains Boy	Smad Place	Morning Assembly
2013
Lord Windermere	Lyreen Legend	Hadrian's Approach
2012
Bobs Worth	First Lieutenant	Call The Police
2011
Bostons Angel	Jessies Dream	Wayward Prince

2010-2001
2010
Weapon's Amnesty	Burton Port	Long Run
2009
Cooldine	Horner Woods	Massini's Maguire
2008
Albertas Run	Roll Along	Battlecry
2007
Denman	Snowy Morning	According To John
2006
Star De Mohaison	Idle Talk	Darkness
2005
Trabolgan	Comply Or Die	Cornish Rebel
2004
Rule Supreme	Royal Emperor	Our Vic
2003
One Knight	Jair Du Cochet	Barrow Drive
2002
Hussard Collonges	Iznogoud	Chives

2000-1991
2000
Lord Noelie	Alexander Banquet	Toto Toscato
1999
Looks Like Trouble	Lord of the River	Billingsgate
1998
Florida Pearl	Escartefigue	Fulip
1997
Hanakham	Eudipe	Djeddah
1996
Nahthen Lad	Mr Mulligan	Do Rightly
1995
Brief Gale	Harcon	Banjo
1994
Monsieur Le Cure	Martomick	Crystal Spirit
1993
Young Hustler	Superior Finish	Its A Cracker
1992
Miinnehoma	Bradbury Star	Run For Free
1991
Rolling Ball	Esha Ness	What's The Crack

1990-1988
1990
Garrison Savannah	The Committee	Chatam
1989
Envopak Token	Nick The Brief	Brown Windsor
1988
The West Awake	Bob Tisdall	Yeoman Broker

The Brown Advisory Novices' Chase is a Grade 1 National Hunt chase in Great Britain which is open to horses aged five years or older. It is run on the Old Course at Cheltenham over a distance of about 3 miles and half a furlong (3 miles and 110 yards, or 4,928 metres), and during its running there are twenty fences to be jumped. The race is for novice chasers, and it is scheduled to take place each year during the Cheltenham Festival in March.

== History ==
The event was originally known as the Broadway Novices' Chase, and this became the race's registered title in 2021, but since the mid-1960s it has been run under various sponsored titles. From 1964 to 1973 it was sponsored by the Tote, and it was called the Totalisator Champion Novices' Chase. From 1974 to 2020 it was backed by the RSA Insurance Group, and its predecessors Sun Alliance (1974–1996) and Royal & SunAlliance (1997–2008). Since 2021 the race has been sponsored by Brown Advisory and Meriebelle Stable.

Several winners of the race have subsequently achieved victory in the most prestigious chase in the National Hunt calendar, the Cheltenham Gold Cup. The most recent was Lord Windermere, the winner of the latter event in 2014.

== Records ==
Leading jockey since 1946 (5 wins):

- Pat Taaffe – Coneyburrow (1953), Solfen (1960), Grallagh Cnoc (1961), Arkle (1963), Proud Tarquin (1970)

Leading trainer since 1946 (8 wins):

- Willie Mullins – Florida Pearl (1998), Rule Supreme (2004), Cooldine (2009), Don Poli (2015), Monkfish (2021), Fact To File (2024), Lecky Watson (2025), Kitzbuhel (2026)

== Winners ==
- Separate divisions of the race indicated by (1) and (2).

Year	Winner	Age	Jockey	Trainer
1921	Habton	5	George Smith	Frank Hartigan
1922	Victor Noir	5	Herbert Smyth	H Smyth
1923	Love Letter	6	Fairland Mason	B M Bullock
1924	Square Meal	9	Tony Escott	Tom Coulthwaite
1925	Uncle Jack	6	Bilbie Rees	G C Poole
1926	Desert Chief	6	William Madden	Thomas R Leader
1927	Ardoon's Pride	7	Jack Anthony	Aubrey Hastings
1928	Kepi Amarante	5	Dick Rees	G Bennett
1929	Gallant Lover	6	Tommy Cullinan	Aubrey Hastings
1930	Swift Rowland	9	Ted Leader	Thomas R Leader
1931	Abandoned due to frost
1932	The Brown Talisman	8	Daniel McCann	Morgan Blair
1933	Swan Upping	6	George Owen	P Dennis
1934	Latest Joke	7	Danny Morgan	Thomas R Leader
1935	Santick	7	Captain R Harding	J Delaney
1936	Prominent Lad	5	Hywell Jones	Jack Anthony
1937	Abandoned due to waterlogging
1938	Koppernigk	6	Thomas F Carey	George Beeby
1939	Roman Hackle	6	George Archibald jr	Owen Anthony
1940	Iceberg II	5	Frenchie Nicholson	R Hobbs
1941	Decorated	7	Percy Lay	A Kilpatrick
1942	Prudent Achtoi	9	George Archibald jr	W Payne
	no race 1943–45
1946	Birthlaw	11	Ted Vinall	Tommy Rayson
1947	Abandoned due to frost and snow
1948 (1)	Blakely Grove	7	Joe Maguire	Ivor Anthony
1948 (2)	Mountain Prince	9	Bryan Marshall	Fulke Walwyn
1949 (1)	Glen Fire	6	Joe Spencer (Note: amateur jockey)	Syd Mercer
1949 (2)	Comeragh	8	D. Kelly	Noel Furlong
1950 (1)	Manicou	5	Lord Mildmay	Peter Cazalet
1950 (2)	Arctic Gold	5	Glen Kelly	Gerald Balding
1951	On View	8	Bryan Marshall	Fulke Walwyn
1952	Good and Plenty	8	Jimmy Power	Jack Fawcus
1953	Coneyburrow	7	Pat Taaffe	Joe Osbourne
1954	Glenbeigh	8	Dave Dick	Fulke Walwyn
1955	Great Eliza	7	Brian Cooper	Danny Morgan
1956	Polar Flight	6	Tommy Cusack	George Spann
1957	Mandarin	6	Michael Scudamore	Fulke Walwyn
1958	Just Awake	6	Arthur Freeman	Peter Cazalet
1959	Mac Joy	7	Arthur Freeman	Ken Bailey
1960	Solfen	8	Pat Taaffe	Willie O'Grady
1961	Grallagh Cnoc	7	Pat Taaffe	Joe Osbourne
1962	Caduval	7	Laurie Morgan	Bogden Lubecki
1963	Arkle	6	Pat Taaffe	Tom Dreaper
1964	Buona Notte	7	Johnny Haine	Bob Turnell
1965	Arkloin	6	Liam McLoughlin	Tom Dreaper
1966	Different Class	6	David Mould	Peter Cazalet
1967	Border Jet	7	Josh Gifford	Ryan Price
1968	Herring Gull	6	John Crowley	Paddy Mullins
1969	Spanish Steps	6	John Cook	Edward Courage
1970	Proud Tarquin	7	Pat Taaffe	Tom Dreaper
1971	Tantalum	7	David Nicholson	Michael Pope
1972	Clever Scot	7	David Mould	Harry Thomson Jones
1973	Killiney	7	Richard Pitman	Fred Winter
1974	Ten Up	7	Tommy Carberry	Jim Dreaper
1975	Pengrail	7	John Francome	Fred Winter
1976	Tied Cottage	8	Tommy Carberry	Dan Moore
1977	Gay Spartan	6	Michael Dickinson	Tony Dickinson
1978	Sweet Joe	6	Steve Smith Eccles	Harry Thomson Jones
1979	Master Smudge	7	Richard Hoare	Arthur Barrow
1980	Lacson	8	Steve Knight	Bob Hawker
1981	Lesley Ann	7	Colin Brown	David Elsworth
1982	Brown Chamberlin	7	John Francome	Fred Winter
1983	Canny Danny	7	Niall Madden	Jimmy FitzGerald
1984	A Kinsman	8	Geordie Dun	John Brockbank
1985	Antarctic Bay	8	Frank Berry	Pat Hughes
1986	Cross Master	9	Reg Crank	Tom Bill
1987	Kildimo	7	Graham Bradley	Toby Balding
1988	The West Awake	7	Simon Sherwood	Oliver Sherwood
1989	Envopak Token	8	Peter Hobbs	Josh Gifford
1990	Garrison Savannah	7	Ben de Haan	Jenny Pitman
1991	Rolling Ball	8	Peter Scudamore	Martin Pipe
1992	Miinnehoma	9	Peter Scudamore	Martin Pipe
1993	Young Hustler	6	Peter Scudamore	Nigel Twiston-Davies
1994	Monsieur Le Cure	8	Peter Niven	John Edwards
1995	Brief Gale	8	Philip Hide	Josh Gifford
1996	Nahthen Lad	7	Warren Marston	Jenny Pitman
1997	Hanakham	8	Richard Dunwoody	Ron Hodges
1998	Florida Pearl	6	Richard Dunwoody	Willie Mullins
1999	Looks Like Trouble	7	Paul Carberry	Noel Chance
2000	Lord Noelie	7	Jim Culloty	Henrietta Knight
2001	Abandoned due to a foot-and-mouth outbreak
2002	Hussard Collonges	7	Russ Garritty	Peter Beaumont
2003	One Knight	7	Richard Johnson	Philip Hobbs
2004	Rule Supreme	8	David Casey	Willie Mullins
2005	Trabolgan	7	Mick Fitzgerald	Nicky Henderson
2006	Star de Mohaison	5	Barry Geraghty	Paul Nicholls
2007	Denman	7	Ruby Walsh	Paul Nicholls
2008	Albertas Run	7	Tony McCoy	Jonjo O'Neill
2009	Cooldine	7	Ruby Walsh	Willie Mullins
2010	Weapon's Amnesty	7	Davy Russell	Charles Byrnes
2011	Bostons Angel	7	Robbie Power	Jessica Harrington
2012	Bobs Worth	7	Barry Geraghty	Nicky Henderson
2013	Lord Windermere	7	Davy Russell	Jim Culloty
2014	O'Faolain's Boy	7	Barry Geraghty	Rebecca Curtis
2015	Don Poli	6	Bryan Cooper	Willie Mullins
2016	Blaklion	7	Ryan Hatch	Nigel Twiston-Davies
2017	Might Bite	8	Nico de Boinville	Nicky Henderson
2018	Presenting Percy	7	Davy Russell	Patrick G Kelly
2019	Topofthegame	7	Harry Cobden	Paul Nicholls
2020	Champ	8	Barry Geraghty	Nicky Henderson
2021	Monkfish	7	Paul Townend	Willie Mullins
2022	L'Homme Presse	7	Charlie Deutsch	Venetia Williams
2023	The Real Whacker	7	Sam Twiston-Davies	Patrick Neville
2024	Fact To File	7	Mark Walsh	Willie Mullins
2025	Lecky Watson	7	Sean O'Keeffe	Willie Mullins
2026	Kitzbuhel	6	Harry Cobden	Willie Mullins

== See also ==
- Horse racing in Great Britain
- List of British National Hunt races
