= Richard Head, 2nd Viscount Head =

British racehorse trainer

Richard Head
- Born: 27 February 1937 (age 88)
- Occupation: Racehorse trainer

Richard Head, 2nd Viscount Head (born 27 February 1937) is a British hereditary peer and retired racehorse trainer.

== Early life and education ==
Head was born in 1937, the elder son of Antony Head, 1st Viscount Head and his wife Lady Dorothea Ashley-Cooper, daughter of Anthony Ashley-Cooper, 9th Earl of Shaftesbury.

He was educated at Eton and at the Royal Military Academy Sandhurst. He subsequently served in the Life Guards between 1957 and 1966, reaching the rank of captain.

Head succeeded to the viscountcy and to a seat in the House of Lords, where he sat as a Crossbencher, upon the death of his father in 1983. He lost his seat on 11 November 1999 following the enactment of the House of Lords Act 1999.

== Career ==
Head was active as a racehorse trainer in Upper Lambourn from 1968 to 1983 and gained his biggest successes with the horses Uncle Bing and Border Incident. Uncle Bing won the Topham Trophy in 1980, while Border Incident's major wins included the Jim Ford Challenge Cup and the Rehearsal Chase.

Head retired from training after succeeding his father as Viscount Head in 1983 and later held positions as chairman of Wincanton Racecourse and on the board at Salisbury Racecourse. He also made occasional speeches in the House of Lords.

== Marriage and children ==
Head married Alicia Brigid Salmond on 11 May 1974. They have three children:

- Hon Henry Julian Head (born 30 March 1980), heir apparent to the viscountcy.
- Hon George Richard Head (born 20 July 1982)
- Hon Sarah Georgiana Head (born 26 November 1984)

Peerage of the United Kingdom
Preceded by Antony Head, 1st Viscount Head	Viscount Head; 1983–present	Incumbent
