= Presenting Percy =

British-bred Thoroughbred racehorse

- Sire: Sir Percy
- Dam: Hunca Munca
- Damsire: Presenting
- Sex: Gelding
- Foaled: 2 April 2011
- Country: Great Britain
- Colour: Bay
- Breeder: Preston Lodge Stud
- Owner: Philip J Reynolds
- Trainer: Gordon Elliott
- Record: 26:11,2,3
- Earnings: £329,322

Major wins
- Pertemps Final (2017); RSA Chase (2018)

Presenting Percy (2 April 2011 - 16 April 2021) was a British thoroughbred racehorse best known for being a dual Cheltenham Festival winner.

== Career ==
Presenting Percy was bred at Preston Lodge Stud owned by Sir Johnny Weatherby, best known as chairman of Weatherbys and the Queens racing representative at Ascot.

Initially trained by Patrick Kelly, Presenting Percy scored his first victory in April 2016 at Ballinrobe in a bumper. He followed this up with three more victories in Ireland before winning the 2017 Pertemps Final at the Cheltenham Festival.

After finishing sixth of eight at Punchestown a month later, Presenting Percy started the new season again with three victories in Ireland. At this Festival he would win the 2018 Grade 1 RSA Chase by a commanding 7 lengths.

A 316-day break resulted in a return at Gowran Park with victory in a Grade 2 hurdle, and at Cheltenham in March he attempted to win the Gold Cup - a race he went off as favourite - finishing 8th. A year later he would attempt the race again, this time falling.

Following the fall, training duties were taken over by Gordon Elliott. Presenting Percy's final victory would come in November 2020 at Thurles. He was due to continue with preparation races for The Gold Cup at Cheltenham and the Grand National at Aintree but a leg infection ruled him out.

Presenting Percy died in April 2021 aged 10 due to a blood infection.
