= Graham Bradley =

British National Hunt jockey (1960–2026)

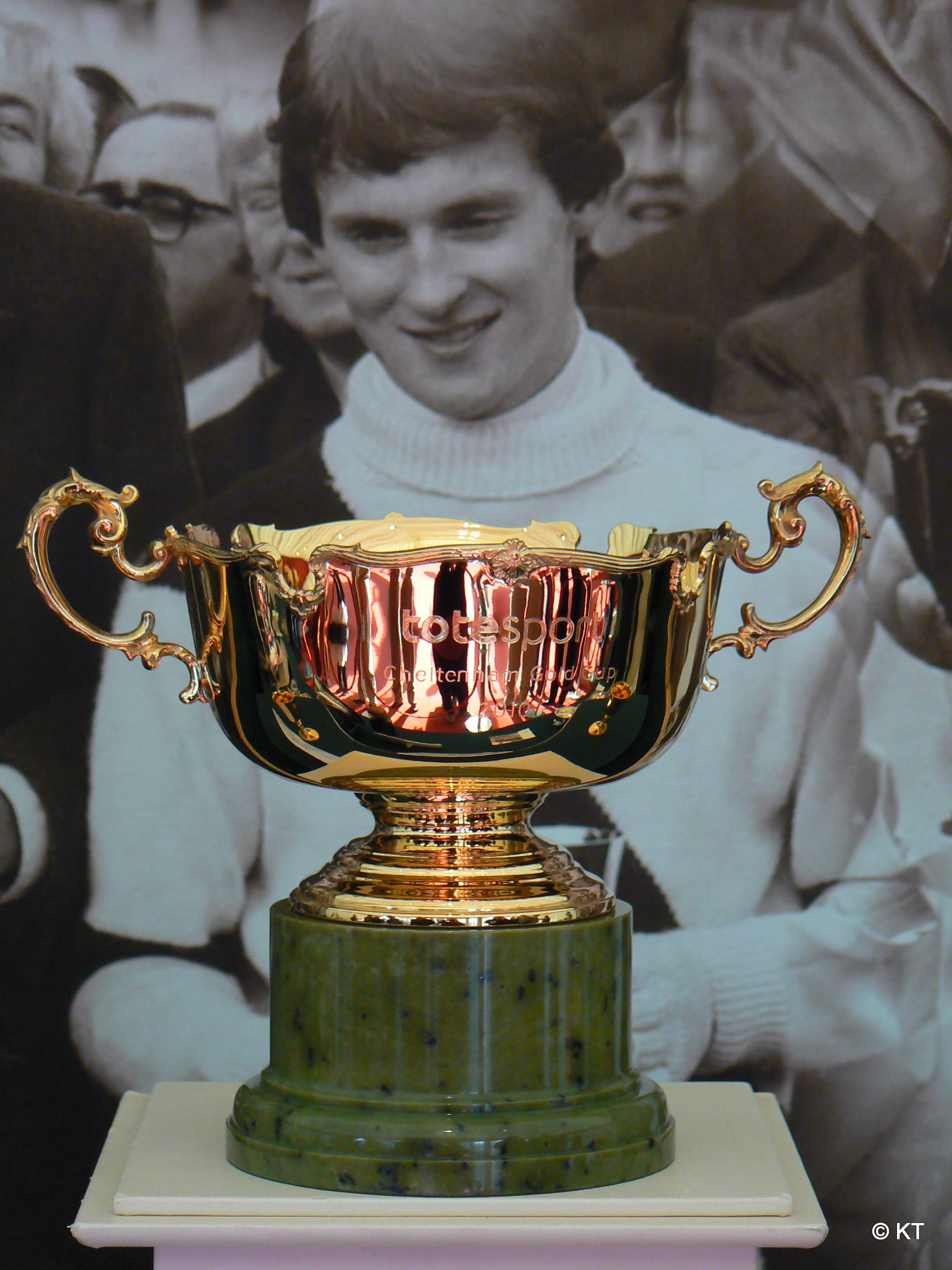
- Bradley with the Cheltenham Gold Cup, 1983

Personal information
- Born: 8 September 1960 Wetherby, England
- Died: 2 July 2026 (aged 65) France
- Occupation: Jockey
- Spouse: Amanda Wilson (m. 2000)
- Children: 1

Horse racing career
- Sport: Horse racing

Major racing wins
- Cheltenham Gold Cup (1983); Irish Grand National (1985); Champion Hurdle (1996); Hennessy Gold Cup (1997)

Significant horses
- Bregawn, Collier Bay, Suny Bay, Wayward Lad

Graham Bradley (8 September 1960 – 2 July 2026) was a British National Hunt jockey, whose victories included the Cheltenham Gold Cup, the Champion Hurdle and the Irish Grand National. Over a 22-year career, in which he rode more than 700 winners, he was at times involved in controversies and, in 2002, he was banned from the sport by the Jockey Club for five years.

== Racing career ==
Bradley grew up in Wetherby in West Yorkshire and was taught to ride by his father, Norman Bradley, who trained racehorses. He rode his first winner aged 20, with his career taking off when he joined the yard of Yorkshire trainer Michael Dickinson. In 1982, he won the Hennessy Gold Cup at Newbury on Bregawn for Dickinson. The partnership then went on to win the 1983 Cheltenham Gold Cup, in which Dickinson saddled the first five home. Over the course of his career, Bradley achieved nine victories at the Cheltenham Festival, including the 1996 Champion Hurdle. Having been jocked off favourite Alderbrook, he won on 9/1 chance Collier Bay, who started at odds of 9/1 and beat the favourite into second place. Bradley won the Grand Annual Chase four times, a post-1945 record which remains unequalled in 2025.

On his first ride in Ireland, Bradley won the 1985 Irish Grand National at Fairyhouse on Rhyme 'n' Reason. He went on to have a number of successes in Ireland over the years. A victory in the Aintree Grand National eluded Bradley; his best result was second place on Suny Bay in the 1998 race. He had won the 1997 Hennessy Gold Cup at Newbury on the popular grey four months previously. Bradley also won the 1984 and 1986 Welsh Grand National. In the 1985–86 season, Wayward Lad, trained by Monica Dickinson, provided Bradley with a victories in the Charlie Hall Chase and King George VI Chase, as well as second places in the Tommy Whittle Chase, the Cheltenham Gold Cup and the Aintree Bowl. Wayward Lad was also the inspiration for the title of the jockey's autobiography.

On his retirement in 1999, Bradley had ridden over 700 winners, with his best season being 1986–87 when he rode 53 winners. A talented and stylish rider, and a popular figure in the weighing room, his career was at times mired in controversy. In 1982 he was suspended for two months for having placed a bet at Cartmel Racecourse. In 1987 he received a three-month suspension under the "non-triers" rule after a race at Market Rasen. The Jockey Club undertook an investigation in 1996 after Bradley pulled up the favourite, Man Mood, in a two-horse race at Warwick. No evidence of wrongdoing was found and the case was dropped. Bradley was arrested in January 1999 and charged in April with race-fixing in relation to the same ride. Charges were dropped in June 1999 and he was able to regain his licence, which had been suspended by the Jockey Club when he was charged. His final ride before he retired was a win on Ontheboil in November 1999.

== Post-racing career ==
Following his retirement, Bradley set up as a bloodstock agent, in particular sourcing National Hunt horses from Germany. Amongst his purchases were the future Cheltenham winners Seebald (for footballers Robbie Fowler and Steve McManaman) and Well Chief (for David Johnson). His new career was cut short by further scandal. In June 2002, he was charged with five offences by the Jockey Club, including giving inside information to drug smuggler and gambler Brian Brendan Wright in return for rewards, something to which he had admitted when appearing as a character witness at the trial of fellow jockey Barrie Wright, who was acquitted of conspiracy to import cocaine. The accusations also featured in a BBC Panorama programme on corruption in racing, broadcast in October 2002. After a three-day hearing at the Jockey Club in November 2002, Bradley was found guilty of three offences: giving inside information in return for rewards; giving inaccurate information about his relationship with Barrie Wright to the licensing committee in June 1999; entering the weighing room on two occasions without permission. A charge of accepting proceeds from bets was not upheld. A charge of having tried to get the 1987 Cheltenham Gold Cup abandoned was also not upheld, but Bradley was fined £2,500 for having brought racing into disrepute by publishing the untrue story in his autobiography. The Jockey Club imposed an eight-year ban on Bradley. This was reduced to five years on appeal. In October 2003, Bradley lost an appeal against his ban in the High Court of Justice. During the ban, he was given a one-day licence to enable him to ride in the Leger Legends Stakes, a charity race at Doncaster in September 2010.

In May 2013, Bradley applied for a licence to become a trainer. He then faced an investigation by the British Horseracing Authority (BHA) into whether he had been training with a licence held by former jockey Brendan Powell. A disciplinary hearing in October 2014 cleared both Bradley and Powell. Bradley withdrew his application for a licence after the BHA informed him that they would oppose it on the grounds that he was not a suitable person to hold a trainer's licence. The BHA also turned down an application by Bradley's wife to register as an owner, but the Irish authorities allowed Bradley to register as the owner of Marchons Ensemble, who won twice on the flat in Ireland.

== Personal life and death ==
Bradley published his autobiography, The Wayward Lad, written with Steve Taylor, in 2000. He married his long-term partner Amanda Wilson in Hull in July 2000. The couple had a daughter and moved to France in 2020. Soon after the move, Bradley was diagnosed with semantic dementia.

Bradley died on 2 July 2026, aged 65.
