= Michael Dickinson (horseman) =

British jockey and trainer

Personal information
- Born: 3 February 1950 (age 76) Yorkshire, England
- Occupation: Trainer

Horse racing career
- Sport: Horse racing
- Career wins: 378 (as a jockey), 587 (as a trainer)

Major racing wins
- As a steeplechase jockey: RSA Chase (1977) As a trainer in English steeplechasing: Mildmay of Flete Handicap Chase (1981); Mersey Novices' Hurdle (1981); Cheltenham Gold Cup (1982, 1983); Hennessy Gold Cup (1982); King George VI Chase (1980, 1982, 1983); Peter Marsh Chase (1982, 1983); Queen Mother Champion Chase (1982, 1983, 1984); Sun Alliance Novices' Hurdle (1983); Blue Square Gold Cup (1983); Supreme Novices' Hurdle (1984); Top Novices' Hurdle (1984) As a trainer in American flat racing: Delaware Handicap (1990); Pennsylvania Governor's Cup Handicap (1990, 1996); Mildmay Novices' Chase (1991); Ashley T. Cole Handicap (1992); Jersey Derby (1995); Sword Dancer Invitational Handicap (1998); Hawthorne Gold Cup Handicap (1999); Ashland Stakes (2001); Mother Goose Stakes (2001); Gulfstream Park Turf Handicap (2002); Stars and Stripes Turf Handicap (2002); Woodlawn Stakes (2002, 2006); Cup and Saucer Stakes (2003); Frank J. De Francis Memorial Dash (2003); Laurel Futurity Stakes (2003); Sky Classic Stakes (2003); West Virginia Derby (2003); Wood Memorial Stakes (2004); Mazarine Stakes (2006); Valedictory Stakes (2006) Breeders' Cup wins: Breeders' Cup Mile (1996, 1998)

Racing awards
- British Champion Amateur Steeplechase Jockey (1970); British jump racing Champion Trainer (1982, 1983, 1984)

Honours
- British Steeplechasing Hall of Fame (1994)

Significant horses
- Wayward Lad, Badsworth Boy, Da Hoss, Tapit

Michael W. Dickinson (born 3 February 1950 in Yorkshire, England) is a retired Champion Thoroughbred racehorse trainer. He is perhaps most remembered for his extraordinary feat of training the first five finishers in the 1983 Cheltenham Gold Cup, who were Bregawn 1st, Captain John 2nd, Wayward Lad 3rd, Silver Buck 4th, and Ashley House 5th. He also trained a record 12 winners on Boxing Day in 1982.

== Life and career ==
Having been educated at Rossall School, Dickinson was an amateur champion rider before becoming a professional jockey for 10 years. His rides included a Classic winner, Boucher.

Dickinson got his trainer's licence in 1980, taking over his parents' stables. He trained at Dunkeswick near Harewood in Yorkshire. He was the Champion Trainer of National Hunt racing for three years in England. Two of his formative years were spent under the tutelage of Vincent O'Brien, the legendary Irish trainer who was master of Ballydoyle, the training center in County Tipperary.

Michael Dickinson is perhaps most famous for his extraordinary feat of training the first five in the 1983 Cheltenham Gold Cup. In order: Bregawn, Captain John, Wayward Lad, Silver Buck, and Ashley House. He also trained a record 12 winners on Boxing Day in 1982, both of which are in the Guinness Book of World Records. He has three other further world records noted in the Guinness Book of World Records.

In 1984, Dickinson switched from National Hunt racing to flat racing, to train for Robert Sangster, before emigrating to Maryland in the U.S., where he had his first runner on 30 June 1987.

In 1993, he was elected to the British Steeplechasing Hall of Fame and inducted on its opening in 1994.

Dickinson's most acclaimed flat training feat came with Da Hoss. He trained the horse to win the 1996 and 1998 Breeders' Cup Mile despite the horse only having had one race in between, owing to injury.

On 13 November 2007, Michael Dickinson announced that he would not apply for a trainer's licence in 2008, in order to devote his time to his business of synthetic racetrack surfacing known as Tapeta Footings.
